= 1904 in chess =

Events in chess in 1904:

== News ==
- The 1904 Cambridge Springs International Chess Congress is the first major international chess tournament in America in the twentieth century. It featured the participation of World Champion Emanuel Lasker, who had not played a tournament since 1900 and would not play again until 1909. American Frank Marshall was the surprise winner.
- The first British Chess Championship organized by the British Chess Federation is held in Hastings. William Ewart Napier wins the men's championship and Kate Belinda Finn wins the women's championship.
- The American Chess Bulletin is founded in New York City by Hermann Helms (1870–1963). Helms is the editor for the entire run of the magazine, which ceases publication in 1962.
- The first official Berlin City Chess Championship is won by Horatio Caro, followed by Ossip Bernstein, Rudolf Spielmann, Wilhelm Cohn, Benjamin Blumenfeld, etc.
- On 28 March 1904, the 32nd University Chess Match between Oxford University and Cambridge University was officiated by match umpire FJ Lee at St George's Chess Club, Northumberland Club, London.

== Births ==
- Erik Andersen
- Mary Bain
- Anneliese Brandler
- Victor Buerger
- Ugo Calà
- Vicente Almirall Castell
- Marie Jeanne Frigard
- Henri Grob
- Jón Guðmundsson
- Karl Helling
- Leho Laurine
- Jacob Levin
- Erik Lundin
- Gottlieb Machate
- Vladimir Makogonov
- Ariah Mohiliver
- Federico Norcia
- Alexander Pituk
- Ludwig Rellstab
- Carlos Torre Repetto
- Lyudmila Rudenko
- Anthony Santasiere
- Gösta Stoltz
- Erling Tholfsen
- A. R. B. Thomas

== Deaths ==
- Willard Fiske (11 November 1831 – 7 September 1904), American librarian and scholar, chess writer, helped organize the first American Chess Congress in 1857.
- Daniel Yarnton Mills (29 August 1849 – 17 December 1904), eight-time Scottish chess champion.
- George Salmon (25 September 1819 – 22 January 1904), Irish mathematician, chess player.
- Emanuel Schiffers (4 May [O.S. 22 April] 1850 – 12 December [O.S. 29 November] 1904), Russian chess player and chess writer.
- Berthold Suhle (1 January 1837 – 26 January 1904), German chess player and chess writer.
