= Jovanka Houska =

English chess player (born 1980)

- Houska at the 2026 Chess Olympiad

Personal information
- Born: 10 June 1980 (age 46) London, England

Chess career
- Country: England
- Title: International Master (2005); Woman Grandmaster (2000)
- FIDE rating: 2293 (November 2026)
- Peak rating: 2433 (July 2010)

Jovanka Houska (born 10 June 1980) is an English chess player with the titles International Master (IM) and Woman Grandmaster (WGM). She is a nine-time British Women's Chess Champion.

== Formative years ==
Born in south London, her family name stems from her grandfather who was part Czech. Her first name is typically Slavic, but was chosen only to complement the family name. Chess is a popular game in the Houska family, and she owes much of her progress to the sibling rivalry that developed with her elder brother Miroslav, himself an International Master of chess, though currently inactive. She has a degree in Law.

One of England's most active professionals, she first represented her country at the World Youth Championship for Girls (under 10) in Timișoara 1988, finishing fifth after a disastrous start and despite being years younger than most of her opponents. She competed in the same event at Aguadilla in 1989 and then, for a third time at Fond du Lac in 1990, where she won the bronze medal. There were many more successes over the next few years including another bronze medal at the European Junior Championship for girls (under 20) at Erevan in 1998. As a consequence, she was awarded the Woman International Master (WIM) title the same year, after securing all three norms in just over a month. Her first WGM norm was achieved at the 1999 British Championship when she was still a teenager.

== European success ==
Then, at Avilés in 2000, her previous efforts were eclipsed by a return visit to the European Junior Championship—capturing the gold winner's medal, ahead of Viktorija Čmilytė. It was a milestone victory, as it also provided a final qualification norm for the WGM title. The following year saw her take the Women's Commonwealth Championship, held in London in conjunction with the Mind Sports Olympiad. She defeated GM Dibyendu Barua in the process and gained a first IM norm.

== Team events ==
Despite her time-consuming academic studies, the next few years were notable for Houska's unstinting contribution to the England Women's team at various major competitions around the world. She participated at each of the Chess Olympiads between 1998 and 2008 and aside from her first appearance as a reserve, has played consistently on high boards, scoring in excess of 50% on each occasion. From 1999 onwards, she has also been an ever-present at the European Team Chess Championships. The team's most notable performance in this event, occurred at Leon in 2001, where a third-place finish produced a team bronze medal.

An active league chess player, she has represented SK Hofheim in the German Bundesliga, Deauville in France, and Wood Green in the 4NCL.

== Further progress ==
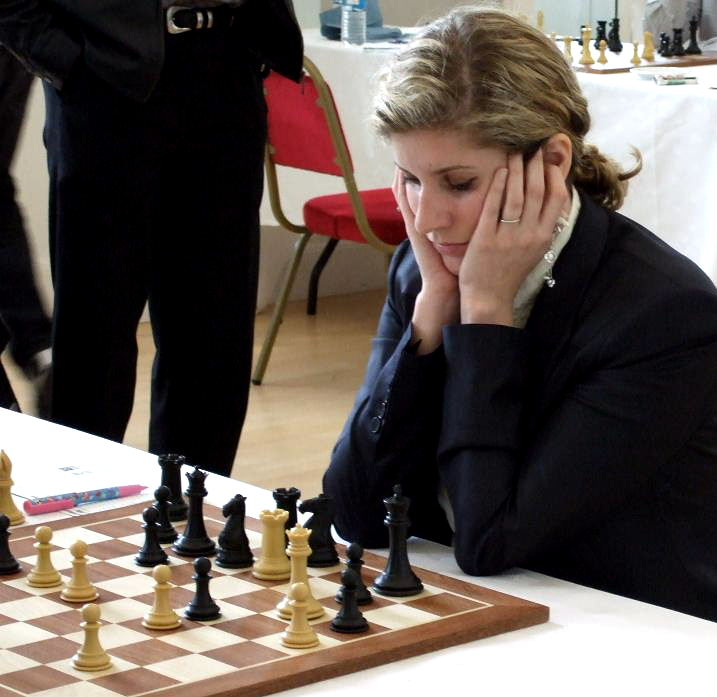
IM Houska at Liverpool's EU Championships, 2008

Following yet more successful norm-seeking, she became the third British woman to be awarded the IM title in 2005. Voted English Chess Federation Player of the Year in 2006, she was the first female to receive the accolade since its inception in 1984. There were 'highest placed Woman' prizes at the Hastings International Chess Congress 2006–7 and at Gibraltar 2007. She also came close to winning the first MonRoi Women's Grand Prix, finally finishing second equal behind Pia Cramling. Her task was much more difficult at the fifth Howard Staunton Memorial Tournament, held at Simpsons-in-the-Strand, where she faced some of the world's top grandmasters and finished in last place.

At Liverpool in 2008, she became British and English Women's Champion for the first time, finishing a full point ahead of closest rival Susan Lalic and a half point ahead of grandmasters Glenn Flear and Stewart Haslinger. Her second Liverpool visit resulted in a third share of the women's best performance prize (jointly with Ketevan Arakhamia-Grant and Yelena Dembo) at the EU Individual Open Chess Championship.

Houska successfully defended her British Championship title at the 2009, 2010, 2011 and 2012 events. By July 2010, her sustained good form had elevated her to an Elo rating of 2433, making her England's second ranked woman player (behind Harriet Hunt) and number fifty-one in the world among active female players. Further British Championship victories were achieved in 2016, 2017, 2018 and 2019.

As a chess writer, she has reported on tournaments home and abroad for periodicals such as CHESS magazine. Houska completed her first chess opening book in 2007. Written for Everyman Chess, it features a treatise on Houska's opening of choice with the Black pieces—the Caro–Kann Defence. A second book, covering the Scandinavian Defence, was published in 2009 and there followed a collaboration on 2010s Dangerous Weapons: The Caro-Kann, with fellow English masters John Emms and Richard Palliser.

== Personal life ==
Houska married Norwegian chess player Arne Hagesaether on 14 March 2009 at the Ice Chapel in Alta, Norway.

== Notable games ==
At the Dresden Olympiad of 2008, Houska won twice against high ranking opposition;

- J. Houska vs A. Stefanova, Slav Defence, 1-0, Women's Olympiad, Dresden 2008
- V. Cmilyte vs J. Houska, Slav Defence, 0-1, Women's Olympiad, Dresden, 2008

== Bibliography ==
- Houska, Jovanka (2007). Play the Caro-Kann – A Complete Chess Opening Repertoire Against 1 e4. London: Everyman Chess. ISBN 978-1-85744-434-6.
- Houska, Jovanka (2009). Starting Out: The Scandinavian. London: Everyman Chess. ISBN 978-1-85744-582-4.
- Emms, John; Palliser, Richard; Houska, Jovanka (2010). Dangerous Weapons: The Caro-Kann – Dazzle Your Opponents!. London: Everyman Chess. ISBN 978-1-85744-635-7.
- Houska, Jovanka (2015). Opening Repertoire. The Caro-Kann. London: Everyman Chess. ISBN 9781781942109.

=== Non-chess books ===
- Houska, Jovanka (2016). The Mating Game. Canterbury: The Conrad Press. ISBN 978-1911546108.
