= Brian Eley =

British chess player

- Eley (r) competing against Ludek Pachman, London, 1972

Personal information
- Born: 6 July 1946 Don Valley, England
- Died: 6 April 2022 (aged 75) Noord-Holland, Netherlands

Brian Ratcliffe Eley (6 July 1946 – 6 April 2022) was a British Chess Champion. He was wanted by the British police on suspicion of sexual offences against underage boys, and was a fugitive from 1991 until his death.

== Chess ==
Brian Eley belonged to the wave of talented chess masters who came to the fore in Britain in the 1970s, after the dominance of Jonathan Penrose ended—a group that included Raymond Keene, William Hartston, George Botterill, Robert Bellin and others.

He took part in domestic chess tournaments, was a chess coach and gave simultaneous exhibitions. For a period around 1971, he wrote an infrequent chess column in the weekly Morning Telegraph of Sheffield. He ran his own chess retail business, supplying books, chess sets, scorebooks and similar items.

In a major upset, Eley won the 1972 British Chess Championship, held in Brighton. Eley's peak FIDE rating of 2350 in 1974 would qualify him for the title of FIDE Master (FM); however, the FM title had not yet been introduced and he never applied for the title.

== Arrest and disappearance ==
In 1979, James Plaskett, who went on to become a grandmaster and British champion, reported to David Anderton, the then president of the British Chess Federation (BCF), incidents of "misconduct" by Eley. The following year, Eley was dismissed from the position of England Team Manager after an unrelated incident. As a BCF-registered coach, Eley continued to teach juniors into the late 1980s.

In July 1991, Eley was arrested at his South Yorkshire home on suspicion of sexually abusing an underage male he had once coached. He was released on bail. Although not charged at the time, Eley jumped bail approximately one month after his arrest, and disappeared. He was subsequently charged with more than 30 offences of a similar nature and remained a fugitive, wanted by the British police and Interpol.

Former British Chess Champion GM John Nunn relates in his autobiography that "Brian Eley achieved notoriety by absconding while on police bail relating to an investigation into paedophile activities." Nunn remarked that Eley "became the only British Chess Champion...to appear on the television programme Crimewatch."

== Life as a wanted person ==
There were over the years numerous unconfirmed reports of sightings of Eley in various places, mostly in Amsterdam. According to reportage by Plaskett's wife, Fiona Pitt-Kethley, which was published some months after his death, Eley had a "miserable time" as a fugitive from British justice. After running out of the money he received from selling his house in the UK, he earned a living playing chess for small bets in cafés and doing computer work for a religious organization's ashram. In 1992, he was identified in Amsterdam by Grandmaster Stuart Conquest and a Dutch chess player, who notified the Dutch police, but Eley, for unknown reasons, was not apprehended. He had reportedly established a small circle of friends in the city to whom he claimed everything was about a "disagreement with the BCF."

== Death ==
Eley died in April 2022 from a respiratory infection at the age of 75, while still residing in Amsterdam.
