= Reginald Pryce Michell =

Reginald Pryce Michell (9 April 1873 in Penzance – 19 May 1938 in Kingston-upon-Thames) was an English chess master.

He was British Amateur Champion in 1902. He played in eight Anglo-American Cable Matches between 1901 and 1911, and twice represented England in the 1st Chess Olympiad at London 1927 and the 5th Chess Olympiad at Folkestone 1933. He received the brilliancy prize in an international match against the Netherlands in 1914.

Michell was a frequent competitor in the Hastings International Chess Congress over 20 years, defeating Mir Sultan Khan and Vera Menchik in 1932/3. He finished 2nd, 3rd and 4th in the British Championship proper, defeating Henry Ernest Atkins on several occasions.

In Margate 1923, he tied for second place with Alexander Alekhine, Bogolyubov, and Muffang. He scored 2.5/4 against Alekhine, Bogolyubov, Réti and Grünfeld.

Michell was active in local chess. He was age 24 before he won the championship of the Metropolitan Chess Club. He won the championship of the West London Chess Club eight times and won the Open Tournament in Brighton in 1904. He won the London Major Open Tournament (i.e. not the Premier) in 1922. He won the prestigious City of London Championship once in 1925-6, coming second on six other occasions. J.H. Blake shared second prize. Michell and Blake subsequently became teammates at Kingston Chess Club. J.H. Michell was Kingston Chess Club champion every year from 1931 to 1938.

He worked in the Admiralty, and his wife Edith Michell (née Tapsell) was British Women's Champion in 1931 (jointly), 1932 and 1935.
