= John Wisker =

English chess player (1846–1884)

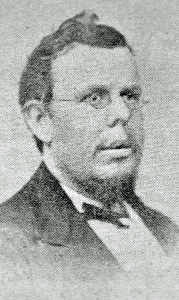
John Wisker

John Wisker (30 May 1846 – 18 January 1884) was an English chess player and journalist. By 1870, he was one of the world's ten best chess players, and the second-best English-born player, behind only Joseph Henry Blackburne.

== Biography ==
Born and educated at Hull, England, Wisker moved to London in 1866 to become a reporter for the City Press and befriended Howard Staunton. His proficiency at chess improved rapidly, and he won the 1870 British Chess Championship after a play-off against Amos Burn, ahead of Joseph H. Blackburne, the defending champion. He won again in 1872 after a play-off against the first British champion, Cecil Valentine De Vere. After this second victory, the British championship was not resumed until 1904.

Wisker edited chess columns for The Sporting Times and Land and Water. From 1872 to 1876, Wisker was Secretary of the British Chess Association and co-editor of The Chess Player's Chronicle.

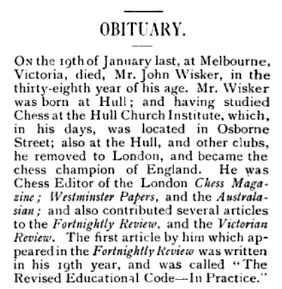
Obituary of John Wisker, The Hull Quarterly, 15 April 1884

After learning that he had contracted tuberculosis, Wisker emigrated to Australia in the autumn of 1876 to try to regain his health. In Australia, he wrote a chess column for the Australasian. In 1884, aged 37, Wisker died from bronchitis and tuberculosis in Melbourne. He is buried at the Boroondara General Cemetery.
