= Yao Lan =

English chess player (born 2000)

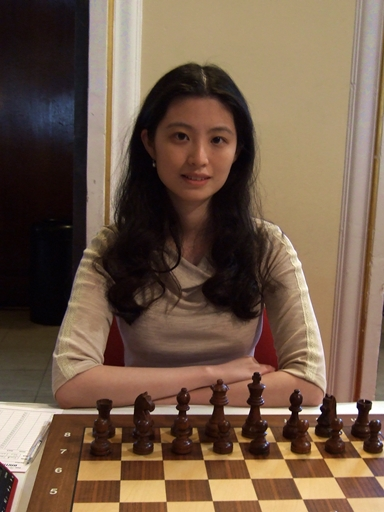
- Lan Yao, British Chess Championships, 2024

Personal information
- Born: 28 December 2000 (age 25)

Chess career
- Country: China (until 2021); England (since 2021)
- Title: Woman Grandmaster (2023)
- Peak rating: 2381 (May 2024)

Yao Lan (born 28 December 2000) is a Chinese-English chess player, and a four-time British Women's champion (2022, 2023, 2024 and 2025). Her 2024 title was shared with the Irish chess player Trisha Kanyamarala and her 2025 title was shared with Elmira Mirzayeva.

She was awarded the FIDE title of Woman Grandmaster in 2023.

At the Andorra Open in 2025, she earned her third norm for the IM title.
