= Miss Fatima =

British-Indian chess player

Ghulam Fatima (c. July 1912 – ?, fl. c. 1990), frequently referred to as 'Miss Fatima', was a British-Indian female chess master.

Ghulam Fatima won the British Women's Chess Championship at Hastings in 1933. Her first formal competition was the 1932 British Women's Chess Championship in London in which she took 6th place (Edith Michell won). She was a member of the household of Sir Umar Hayat Khan. The British Men's Chess Champion in 1929, 1932, and 1933 was Mir Sultan Khan, a servant of Sir Umar Hayat Khan. According to Edward Winter, "Miss Fatima was interviewed about Sultan Khan in the Bandung Limited television production The Sultan of Chess broadcast by Channel 4 in the United Kingdom on 19 September 1990. She mentioned that she had given some chess instruction to Queen Mary, the wife of George V."
