= Canadian Centre for Ecumenism =

Canadian non-profit organization

The Canadian Centre For Ecumenism (CCE) is a non-profit organization whose main focus is interfaith dialogues and is established in Montreal, Québec, Canada. The centre is supported by the Canadian Conference of Catholic Bishops. It promotes conversations, interfaith dialogues and ecumenical dialogues.

== History of the organization ==
The Canadian Centre for Ecumenism was founded in 1963 by Reverend Irénée Beaubien and promotes interfaith dialogues between different religions and Christianity. In 1976, a board of directors was established and they obtained a federal charter.

== Mission statement ==
The Canadian Centre For Ecumenism's mission is to raise awareness and harmony through education and activities that promote Christianity and all other religions and collaborate to become interfaith.

== Religious affiliations ==
A religious affiliation is an association between a person and a religious group.

The Canadian Centre For Ecumenism has many religious affiliations which include:

- The Green Churches Network
- Prairie Center of Ecumenism
- Multi-Faith Saskatoon
- World Council of Churches
- Réseau oecuménique justice et paix

== Faith dialogues ==
An interfaith dialogue is a written or spoken conversation between people and their difference in religions. The centre's main model is the Christian-Jewish Dialogue which was made in the 1960s. This dialogue has helped to form other interfaith dialogues around Canada.

The Faith Dialogues include:

- Christian-Jewish Dialogue of Montreal (CJDM)
- North American Orthodox-Catholic Theological Consultation
- Canadian Christian Jewish Consultation
- Roman Catholic-United Church
- Anglican-Roman Catholic Bishops
- National Christian Muslim Liaison Committee
- Anglican-Roman Catholic
- Orthodox Catholic Bishops
- Religious Leaders of the G8 Nations

== Current activities ==
The Canadian Centre for Ecumenism takes part in The Faith Challenge G8 which is currently ongoing and is helping the Millennium Development Goals (MDG) reach its goals for the year of 2015.

The Faith Challenge G8 makes commitments to help with poverty, HIV/AIDS, child mortality, hunger and help to maintain the environment.

The Millennium Development Goals are eight international development goals made by the United Nations and said to be achieved by the year 2015.

== Past events ==
On September 7, 2011, the Canadian Centre for Ecumenism launched the Youth Chess Tournaments for Peace along with MonRoi Inc. at the Palais de Congrès in Montreal, Quebec, Canada. The game was sponsored by the Chess'n Math Association as well as the World Chess Federation. The young interfaith chess players are taught peace through playing chess.

The chess event coincided with their 2nd Global Conference of World Religions After 9/11 with a special presence by the Dalai Lama. The 2nd Global Conference of World Religions After 9/11's objective was to help for a cultural understanding of peace as well as bring all different religions together to discuss the different problems our world is facing.

In 2009, Tony Blair and Belinda met with eight inspiring young Canadians from a leadership program. This program was made to bring together different people from different religious backgrounds and bring them together to achieve the Millennium Development Goals (MDG) by 2015. Two of the eight Canadians were Maya Smith and Nicholas Pang sponsored by the Canadian Centre for Ecumenism. The goal with working as an interfaith pair is to raise awareness to thousands of people through activities and online activities about malaria and help communities to save lives affected by it.

== Publication ==
The Canadian Centre for Ecumenism has a periodical journal called Ecumenism. The journal's main focus is important religious issues. Four issues are printed annually and there are currently many people subscribed to it in over 40 countries around the globe from Canada, the United States, Europe and Asia.

== Library ==
There is a public library at their location in Montreal, Quebec, Canada. The public can find books, magazines, articles and audio-visual collections of topics relating to ecumenical movements, churches, human rights, Sacred Scriptures and many more. Anyone can use their online search from the library collection found on their personal website.
