= 3Cs Chess Club =

Chess club in Oldham, England

- Type: Youth-Focused Chess Club
- Founded: 1978
- Founder: Steve Rigby BEM
- Location: Oldham
- Country: England
- Website: Official Website

3Cs Chess Club (The Children's Chess Club of Oldham) is a chess club founded in Oldham, England, in 1978 by Steve Rigby BEM. The club has so far produced 23 British champions and 39 England internationals as well as a Grandmaster winning the English Chess Federation's "Club of the Year" award three times. While its main focus is on junior players, it also includes adult members, and its activities include coaching, individual play, and team participation in various tournaments.
