= Sultan Khan (chess player) =

Pakistani chess grandmaster (1903–1966)

Personal information
- Born: 1903 Mitha Tiwana, Punjab, British India (today Khushab District, Pakistan)
- Died: 25 April 1966 (aged 62–63) Sargodha, Punjab, Pakistan

Chess career
- Country: British India (1903–1947); Pakistan (1947–1966)
- Title: Honorary Grandmaster (posthumous, 2024)

Sultan Khan (Punjabi and Urdu: میاں سلطان خان, 1903 – 25 April 1966; often erroneously given the honorific Mir Sultan Khan or Mir Malik Sultan Khan) was a chess player from British India, and later a citizen of Pakistan, who was the strongest Asian player of the early 1930s. The son of a Muslim landlord and preacher, Khan travelled with Colonel Nawab Sir Umar Hayat Khan (Sir Umar), to Britain, where he took the chess world by storm. In an international chess career of less than five years (1929–33), he won the British Championship three times in four attempts (1929, 1932, 1933), and had tournament and match results that placed him among the top ten players in the world. Sir Umar then brought him back to his homeland, where he gave up chess and returned to cultivate his ancestral farmlands in the area which became Pakistan. He lived there before dying in his sixties in the city of Sargodha. David Hooper and Kenneth Whyld have called him "perhaps the greatest natural player of modern times". In 2024 FIDE posthumously awarded him the title of Honorary Grandmaster.

== Chess career ==
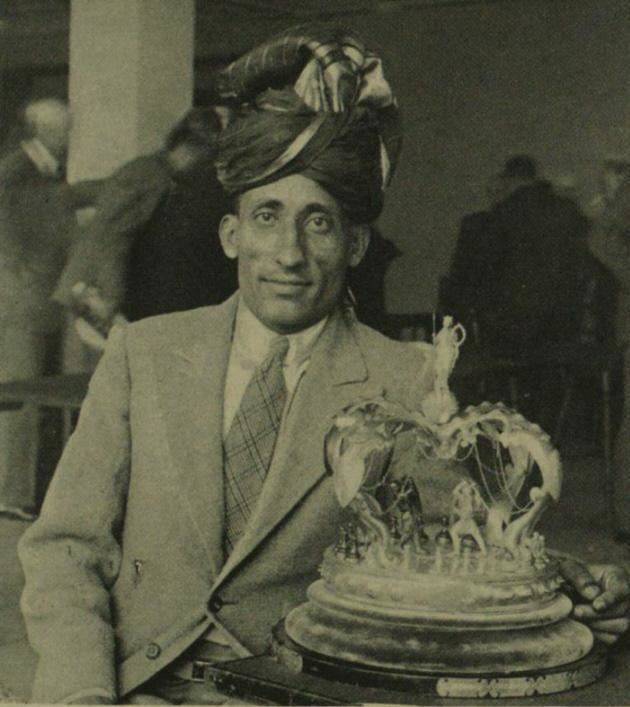
Sultan Khan with his trophy after winning the British Chess Championship (1932)

Sultan Khan was born in 1903 in Mitha Tiwana, Khushab, Sargodha (then British India, today Pakistan), to a Punjabi Muslim Awan family of pirs and landlords. He learned Indian chess from his father at the age of nine. By the time he was 21 he was considered the strongest player in Punjab. At that time, Sir Umar took him into his household with the idea of teaching him the European version of the game and introducing him to European master chess. In 1928, he won the all-India championship, scoring eight wins, one draw, and no losses.

In the spring of 1929, Sir Umar took him to London, where a training tournament was organized for his benefit. Due to his inexperience and lack of theoretical knowledge, he did poorly, tying for last place with H. G. Conde, behind William Winter and Frederick Yates. After the tournament, Winter and Yates trained with him to help prepare him for the British Chess Championship to be held that summer. To everyone's surprise, he won. Soon afterwards, he went back to India with Sir Umar.

Returning to Europe in May 1930, Sultan Khan began an international chess career that included wins over many of the world's leading players. His best results were second to Savielly Tartakower at Liège 1930; third at Hastings 1930–31 (+5−2=2) behind future World Champion Max Euwe and former World Champion José Raúl Capablanca; fourth at Hastings 1931–32; fourth at Bern 1932 (+10−3=2); and a tie for third with Isaac Kashdan at London 1932, behind World Champion Alexander Alekhine and Salo Flohr. Sultan Khan again won the British Championship in 1932 and 1933. In matches he narrowly defeated Tartakower in 1931 (+4−3=5) and narrowly lost to Flohr in 1932 (+1−2=3).

Sultan Khan thrice played first board for England at Chess Olympiads. At Hamburg 1930, there was still no rule that teams must put their best player on the top board, and some teams, unconvinced of his strength, matched their second or even third-best player against him. He scored nine wins, four draws, and four losses (64.7%). At Prague 1931, he faced a much stronger field. He had an outstanding result, scoring eight wins, seven draws, and two losses (67.6%). This included wins against Flohr and Akiba Rubinstein and draws with Alekhine, Kashdan, Ernst Grünfeld, Gideon Ståhlberg, and Efim Bogoljubow. At Folkestone 1933, he had his worst result, an even score, winning four games, drawing six, and losing four. Once again, his opponents included the world's best players, such as Alekhine, Flohr, Kashdan, Tartakower, Grünfeld, Ståhlberg, and Lajos Steiner.

Reuben Fine wrote of him:

The story of the Indian Sultan Khan turned out to be a most unusual one. The "Sultan" was not the term of status that we supposed it to be; it was merely a first name. He spoke English poorly and kept score in Hindustani. It was said that he could not even read the European notations.

After the tournament [the 1933 Folkestone Olympiad] the American team was invited to the home of Sultan Khan's master in London. When we were ushered in we were greeted by the maharajah with the remark, "It is an honor for you to be here; ordinarily I converse only with my greyhounds." Although he was a Mohammedan, the maharajah had been granted special permission to drink intoxicating beverages, and he made liberal use of this dispensation. He presented us with a four-page printed biography telling of his life and exploits; so far as we could see his greatest achievement was to have been born a maharajah.

In December 1933, Sir Umar took him back to India. In 1935, he won a match against V. K. Khadilkar, yielding just one draw in ten games. The chess world never heard from him again.

== Later life ==
Miss Fatima, also a servant of Sir Umar, had won the British Ladies Championship in 1933 by a remarkable three-point margin, scoring ten wins, one draw, and no losses. She said that Sultan Khan, upon his return to India, felt as though he had been freed from prison. In the damp English climate, he had been continually afflicted with malaria, colds, influenza, and throat infections, often arriving to play with his neck swathed in bandages. Sir Umar died in 1944. Sultan Khan lived for the rest of his life with his family in Sargodha. Ather Sultan, his eldest son, recalled that he would not coach his children at chess, telling them that they should do something more useful with their lives.

Sultan Khan died of tuberculosis in Sargodha, Pakistan (the same district where he had been born) on 25 April 1966. Sultan Khan's son Ather Sultan is a graduate of the London School of Economics and retired as an Inspector General of Police from the Government of Pakistan. His granddaughter, Atiyab Sultan, holds a doctorate from the University of Cambridge.

== Legacy ==
Sultan Khan was the first person of color to achieve success in the chess world at the highest level. His story has been distorted and mythologized in many popular accounts of his life and career. Some of these accounts describe him as something of an idiot savant, an illiterate servant with a miraculous gift for chess, such as British Grandmaster Daniel King's 2020 biography Sultan Khan: The Indian Servant who became Chess Champion of the British Empire.

Members of Sultan Khan's family have endeavored to correct these misconceptions. Sultan Khan's granddaughter Atiyab Sultan clarified three issues with King's book in a blog post on the online platform Chess.com, explaining that Sultan Khan held a Pakistani identity, not Indian; that he came from a respected and influential family; and that he was not illiterate or menial. In this blog post, she writes, "It can be tempting for a certain class of writers to cast achievements of people of colour as extraordinary and miraculous and so they seek to dehumanize them as illiterate savages defying gravity, because the truth that they could succeed purely on merit is too hard to bear."

Sultan Khan's son and granddaughter have collaborated to write their own version of his biography, Endgame of Empire: Sultan Khan, Asia's First Grandmaster. The book takes Sultan Khan's life in the context of British colonialism and includes the first detailed account of his life before and after his chess career. It is being published by Fordham University Press and is set to release on 09 March 2026.

== Chess strength ==
In his brief but meteoric career, Sultan Khan rose to the top of the chess world, playing on even terms with the world's best players. By Arpad Elo's calculation, his playing strength during his five-year peak was equivalent to an Elo rating of 2530.

In 1950, when FIDE first awarded the titles of International Grandmaster and International Master, Sultan Khan had not played for 15 years. However, FIDE made a practice of awarding titles to some long-retired players who had distinguished careers earlier in their lives, such as Rubinstein and Carlos Torre.

Hooper and Whyld write of him:

When Sultan Khan first travelled to Europe his English was so rudimentary that he needed an interpreter. Unable to read or write, he never studied any books on the game, and he was put into the hands of trainers who were also his rivals in play. He never mastered openings which, by nature empirical, cannot be learned by the application of common sense alone. Under these adverse circumstances, and having known international chess for a mere seven years, only half of which was spent in Europe, Sultan Khan nevertheless had few peers in the middlegame, was among the world's best two or three endgame players, and one of the world's best ten players. This achievement brought admiration from Capablanca who called him a genius, an accolade he rarely bestowed.

FIDE awarded the title of Honorary Grandmaster to Khan posthumously on February 2, 2024. FIDE president Arkady Dvorkovich presented the award to Caretaker Prime Minister of Pakistan Anwaar ul Haq Kakar.

== Notable games ==
- Probably Sultan Khan's most famous game is his win as White against Capablanca at Hastings 1930–31:
  1.Nf3 Nf6 2.d4 b6 3.c4 Bb7 4.Nc3 e6 5.a3 d5 6.cxd5 exd5 7.Bg5 Be7 8.e3 0-0 9.Bd3 Ne4 10.Bf4 Nd7 11.Qc2 f5 12.Nb5 Bd6 13.Nxd6 cxd6 14.h4 Rc8 15.Qb3 Qe7 16.Nd2 Ndf6 17.Nxe4 fxe4 18.Be2 Rc6 19.g4 Rfc8 20.g5 Ne8 21.Bg4 Rc1+ 22.Kd2 R8c2+ 23.Qxc2 Rxc2+ 24.Kxc2 Qc7+ 25.Kd2 Qc4 26.Be2 Qb3 27.Rab1 Kf7 28.Rhc1 Ke7 29.Rc3 Qa4 30.b4 Qd7 31.Rbc1 a6 32.Rg1 Qa4 33.Rgc1 Qd7 34.h5 Kd8 35.R1c2 Qh3 36.Kc1 Qh4 37.Kb2 Qh3 38.Rc1 Qh4 39.R3c2 Qh3 40.a4 Qh4 41.Ka3 Qh3 42.Bg3 Qf5 43.Bh4 g6 44.h6 Qd7 45.b5 a5 46.Bg3 Qf5 47.Bf4 Qh3 48.Kb2 Qg2 49.Kb1 Qh3 50.Ka1 Qg2 51.Kb2 Qh3 52.Rg1 Bc8 53.Rc6 Qh4 54.Rgc1 Bg4 55.Bf1 Qh5 56.Re1 Qh1 57.Rec1 Qh5 58.Kc3 Qh4 59.Bg3 Qxg5 60.Kd2 Qh5 61.Rxb6 Ke7 62.Rb7+ Ke6 63.b6 Nf6 64.Bb5 Qh3 65.Rb8 1–0 Black resigned.
- Sultan Khan won this crushing victory as Black against the Russo-Belgian player Victor Soultanbeieff at Liège 1930:
  1.d4 Nf6 2.Nf3 b6 3.c4 e6 4.g3 Bb7 5.Bg2 Bb4+ 6.Bd2 Bxd2+ 7.Nbxd2 0-0 8.0-0 c5 9.Qc2 Nc6 10.dxc5 bxc5 11.e4 Qc7 12.Rfe1 d6 13.Rac1 h6 14.a3 Nd7 15.Qc3 a5 16.Nh4 g5 17.Qe3 Qd8 18.Nhf3 Qe7 19.h3 Rab8 20.b3 Ba8 21.Nb1 Nde5 22.a4 Nxf3+ 23.Bxf3 Nd4 24.Bd1 f5 25.exf5 Rxf5 26.Rc3 Rbf8 27.Rf1 Rf3! 28.Bxf3 Rxf3 0–1 White resigned.
- In this game from Liège 1930, long-time American champion Frank Marshall (Black) tries to add to his long list of brilliancies, but Sultan Khan defends coolly. His biographer calls his play "a wonderful example of sang-froid under pressure":
  1. e4 e5 2. d4 exd4 3. Qxd4 Nc6 4. Qe3 Nf6 5. Nc3 Be7 Coles writes, "Sultan has unwittingly chosen one of the more hazardous openings against a master with a record of brilliancies in open games, and as will be seen Marshall is psychologically unable to resist a try for a brilliancy against this inexperienced opponent." 6. Bd2 d5 7. exd5 Nxd5 8. Nxd5 Qxd5 9. Ne2 Bg4 10. Nf4 Qd7 11. f3 0-0-0 12. 0-0-0 Avoiding the complications of 12.fxg4 Bh4+. 12... Rhe8?! Marshall insists on a piece sacrifice rather than retreating the bishop. 13. fxg4 Bb4 14. Qf2! Not falling for 14.Qb3?? Qxd2+! 15.Rxd2 Re1+ and mate next. 14... Bc5 15. Qf3! Allowing the queen to interpose on d1 if Black plays the queen sacrifice. 15... Re3 16. Qd5! Not 16.Bxe3?? Bxe3+, winning. Now 16...Qxd5 17.Nxd5 Rxd5 18.Bc4! leaves White an exchange ahead. 16... Qe7 17. Qf5+ Kb8 18. Nd3 Rdxd3 "Tantamount to resignation." 19. Bxd3 Nd4 20. Qxh7 a6 21. Bxe3 Qxe3+ 22. Kb1 Nc6 23. Qe4 Qh6 24. c3 Bd6 25. h4 Ne5 26. Bc2 Qe6 1–0 Black lost on time.

== See also ==
- Srinivasa Ramanujan
