= Mike Hennigan =

Mike Hennigan may refer to:

- Michael Hennigan (chess player) (born 1970), English chess player
- Mike Hennigan (footballer) (born 1942), English footballer and manager
- Mike Hennigan (American football) (born 1951), American football player and coach
