= Gillian Moore =

Gillian Moore may refer to:

- Gillian Moore (headteacher)
- Gillian Moore (chess player)
