= Anne Sunnucks =

English chess player (1927–2014)

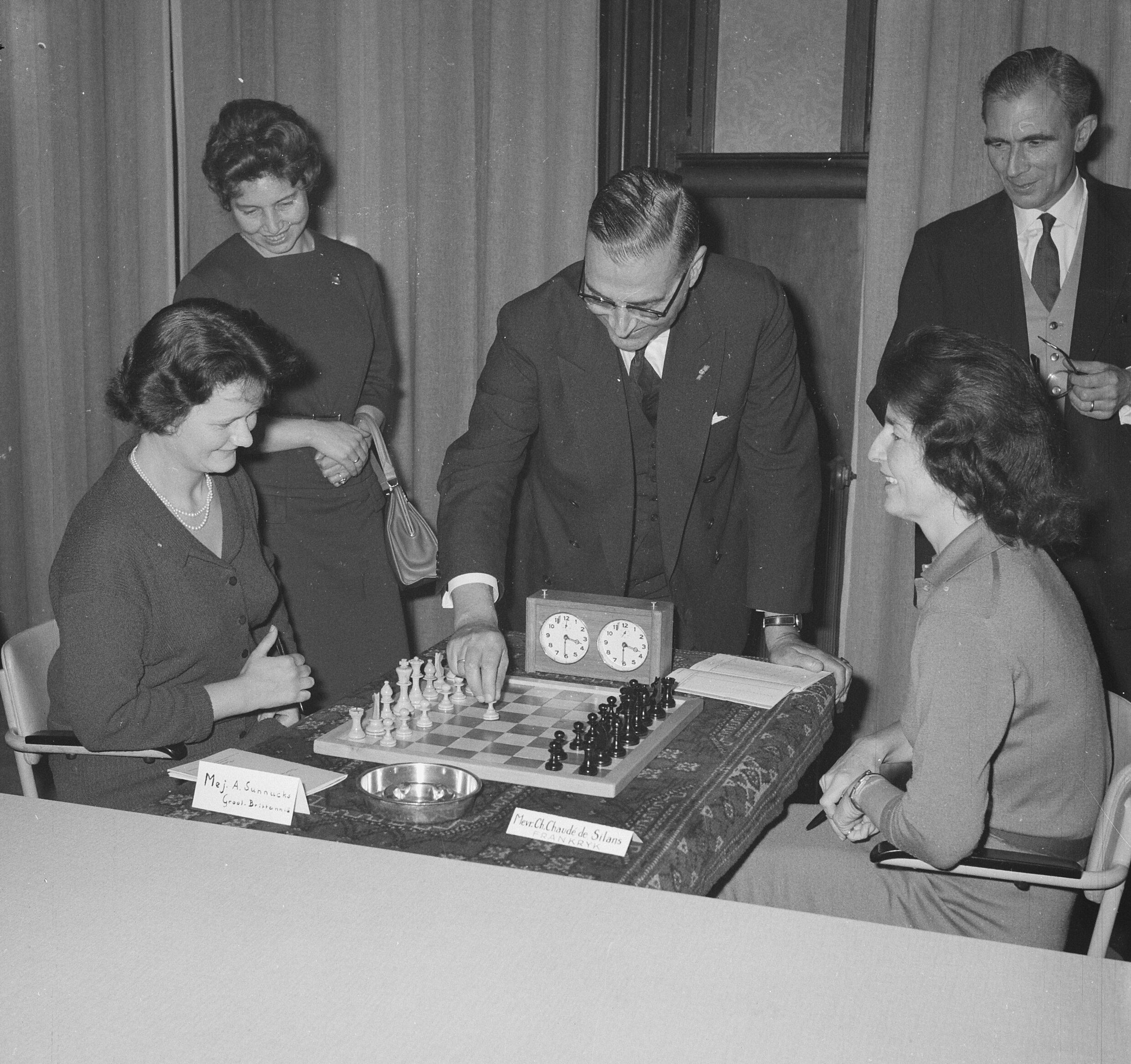
Sunnucks vs Chaudé de Silans (Amsterdam, 1962)

Patricia Anne Sunnucks (21 February 1927 – 22 November 2014) was an author and three-times British Women's Chess Champion (1957, 1958, 1964). During her chess career she was always known as Anne Sunnucks.

She was educated at Wycombe Abbey School, Buckinghamshire. Although she learned how to play chess at the age of 8, she did not play seriously until the age of 21, when she joined the same chess club as Imre König, an International Master, who became her tutor. By finishing in second place in the 1953 British Women's Championship she became one of three British representatives in the 1954 Western European Zonal, together with Rowena Bruce and Eileen Tranmer.

Miss Sunnucks earned the Woman International Master title by coming second in the 1954 Western European Zonal. Although this result qualified her to play in the next event in the Women's World Championship Interzonal, she was a Major in the Women's Royal Army Corps and the authorities would not allow her to travel to the USSR where the 1955 Women's Candidates tournament was being held. She represented England several times in Olympiads and team matches, including Great Britain vs. USSR 1954, the Anglo-Dutch match in 1965, and top board for the British Chess Federation (BCF) team at the 1966 Women's Chess Olympiad at Oberhausen. She participated in the Women's World Championship cycle twice more, representing the BCF in the Western European Zonal tournaments of 1963 and 1966. Anne took both the Army and the Combined Services Championships in 1968, and was the only lady to compete in either. Later she became a chess book seller and hosted the local Camberley CC.

Latterly, her work concerned itself with insurance. In the chess world, she was best known for compiling The Encyclopaedia of Chess (1970, second edition: 1976).

Her married name was Anne Mothersill. She died in a Sussex nursing home where her husband had also resided.
