= Haygarth =

Haygarth is a surname. Notable people with the name include:

- Arthur Haygarth (1825–1903), English cricketer and cricket historian
- Brent Haygarth (born 1967), South African tennis player
- Edward Haygarth (1854–1915), English cricketer and soccer player
- John Haygarth (1740–1827), British physician
- Michael Haygarth (1934–2016), English chess master
- Tony Haygarth (1945–2017), British television, film and theatre actor
