= Victor Buerger =

Ukrainian-British chess player (1904–1996)

Personal information
- Born: 29 January 1904 Mykolaiv, Russian Empire
- Died: 1996 UK

Chess career
- Country: England

Victor Buerger (Berger) (29 January 1904 – 1996) was a Ukrainian–British chess player.

== Biography ==
Buerger was born in Mykolaiv, Ukraine (then Russian Empire) and became a member of London Chess Club.

=== Tournament results ===
In 1923, Buerger tied for 5–7th in Pardubice (Pardubitz). In 1924, he tied for 7–9th in London. In 1925–26, he tied for 5–6th in Hastings (Alekhine and Vidmar won). In 1926, he tied for 1st with Yates in London. In 1926–27, he tied for 7–8th in Hastings (Tartakower won).

In 1927, he tied for 9–11th in London (Nimzowitsch and Tartakower won), tied for 3rd–4th in Tunbridge Wells, and tied for 4–6th in Scarborough (Colle won). In 1927–28, he tied for 3rd–4th in Hastings (Tartakower won). In 1928, he won in Cheltenham, took 2nd in Tenby, and tied for 7–8th in Scarborough (Winter won). In 1928–29, he took 9th in Hastings. In 1929, he tied for 2nd–3rd in London. In 1930, he tied for 1st–3rd in London.

In 1932, Buerger took 11th in London (Alekhine won). In 1937, he took 9th in an invitation-only Margate tournament that Fine and Keres won. He scored his most notable win at Margate, defeating Alexander Alekhine in a game marred by multiple mutual blunders in time pressure.
