= Elaine Pritchard =

English chess player

Personal information
- Full name: Elaine Zelia Pritchard
- Born: 7 January 1926
- Died: 7 January 2012 (aged 86)

Chess career
- Country: England
- Title: Woman International Master (1957)
- Peak rating: 2150 (January 1990)

Elaine Zelia Pritchard (7 January 1926 – 7 January 2012), née Saunders, was an English chess player who held the title of Woman International Master (WIM, 1957). She was a four-time winner of the British Women's Chess Championship (1939, 1946, 1956, 1965).

== Biography ==
Pritchard learned to play chess at the age of five, and was considered a child prodigy. For two consecutive years, she won the World Girl Chess Championships (1936, 1937), and also successfully participated in simultaneous exhibitions against Alexander Alekhine and Rudolf Spielmann.

For decades, she was among England's leading women chess players. Elaine Pritchard four times won the British Women's Chess Championships (1939, 1946 — after winning an additional match against Rowena Mary Bruce, 1956, 1965).

Pritchard played for England in the Women's Chess Olympiads:

- In 1957, at first board in the 1st Chess Olympiad (women) in Emmen (+6, =4, -4),
- In 1972, at second board in the 5th Chess Olympiad (women) in Skopje (+1, =2, -4),
- In 1974, at second board in the 6th Chess Olympiad (women) in Medellín (+4, =2, -2),
- In 1976, at second board in the 7th Chess Olympiad (women) in Haifa (+4, =2, -2) and won the team silver medal,
- In 1978, at second board in the 8th Chess Olympiad (women) in Buenos Aires (+2, =3, -1).

In 1957, she was awarded the FIDE Woman International Master (WIM) title. She was author of two chess books and an Honorary Life Member of the English Chess Federation.

She married David Pritchard in 1952. They had one daughter, Wanda, and, at the time of David’s death, five grandchildren.

== Literature ==
- Elaine Pritchard. Chess For Pleasure. London. 1971. ISBN 9780571092017
- Elaine Pritchard. Young Chess Player. London. 1976. ISBN 9780571105670
