= Robert Wade (chess player) =

New Zealand and British chess player (1921–2008)

Bob Wade
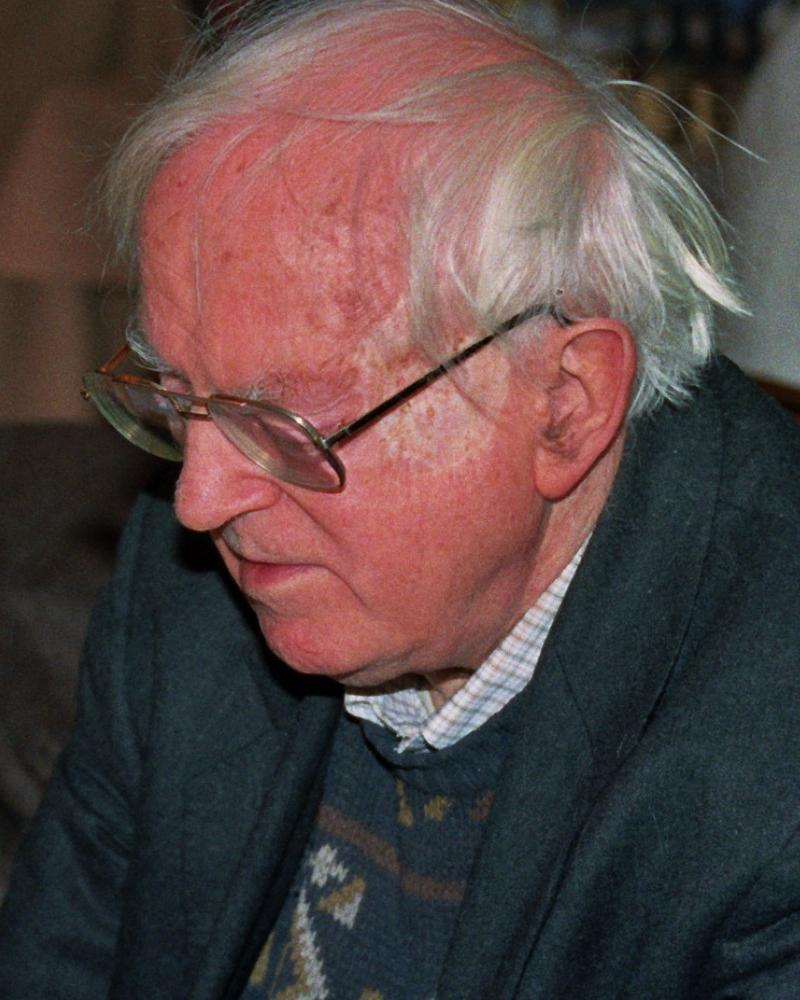
- Wade in 1995

Personal information
- Born: Robert Graham Wade; 10 April 1921 Dunedin, New Zealand
- Died: 29 November 2008 (aged 87) London, England

Chess career
- Country: New Zealand; England
- Title: International Master (1950); International Arbiter (1958)

Robert Graham Wade OBE (10 April 1921 – 29 November 2008), known as Bob Wade, was a New Zealand and English chess player, writer, arbiter, coach, and promoter. He was New Zealand champion three times, British champion twice, and played in seven Chess Olympiads and one Interzonal tournament. Wade held the titles of International Master and International Arbiter.

== Early career in New Zealand ==
Wade grew up on a farm in Dunedin, New Zealand, far from the world's chess centres, and lacked strong competition early in his career. He developed his chess skills from materials in his local library, such as the British Chess Magazine and works by Australian champion Cecil Purdy.

After winning the New Zealand Chess Championship in 1944, 1945 and 1948, he travelled to Europe to further his chess career. International chess was starting up again after a six-year hiatus caused by World War II. For most Masters, it was a matter of dusting off their skills, but Wade had little if any high-class experience to draw upon, so he struggled at first with the new standard. Wade was attempting to become the first international-class player from New Zealand. He played in the British Chess Championship at Nottingham 1946, the first post-war championship, placing tied 10–12th with just 3½/11. His first continental European event was Barcelona 1946, won by Miguel Najdorf; Wade was a tailender with just 3/13 for a tied 12–13th place. Wade played in the Australian Chess Championship at Adelaide 1946–47, placing tied 2nd–4th with 10½/15, with Lajos Steiner winning. Wade travelled as far as Canada to compete in the 1947 Canadian Chess Championship at Quebec City, scoring 7/13 to tie 7–8th places, with Daniel Yanofsky winning.

== British career ==
Better things lay ahead on Wade's next European foray. He scored 5½/9 at Baarn 1948 for a tied 2nd–3rd place, with Harry Golombek winning. Wade made 3½/9 at Hastings 1948–49 for 8th place, with Nicolas Rossolimo winning. He represented New Zealand and Australia at the FIDE Congress at Paris 1949, which marked the 25th anniversary of the founding of FIDE in Paris in 1924.

Wade played many strong events in 1949, raising his standard significantly with competition against top-class Grandmasters. At Beverwijk 1949, he scored 4½/9 for a tied 6–7th place, with Savielly Tartakower winning. Wade placed 2nd at Arbon 1949 with 6/7, trailing only Ludek Pachman. He struggled at Trencianske Teplice 1949, placing last with 4½/19, as Gideon Ståhlberg won. At Heidelberg 1949, Wade scored 4/9 for a tied 6–8th place, as Wolfgang Unzicker won. Then at Oldenburg 1949, Wade made 8½/18 for 10th place, with Efim Bogoljubow and Elmārs Zemgalis on top. At Southsea 1950, Wade scored 6/10 for a shared 7–13th place, as Arthur Bisguier won. The constant practice led to his best result to date, an excellent shared 5–7th place in a powerful field at Venice 1950 with 8½/15, with Alexander Kotov the champion. This earned Wade the International Master title later that year. Wade drew a 1950 match at Bamberg by 5–5 with Lothar Schmid, and settled in England.

Wade was British Champion in 1952 (at Chester, with 8/11), and 1970 (at Coventry, with 8/11). His other high finishes in the British Championship were 3rd at Hastings 1953 on 7½/11 (with Daniel Yanofsky winning), 2nd at Rhyl 1969 on 7½/11 (with Jonathan Penrose winning), and tied 3rd–6th at Blackpool 1971 on 7/11 (with Raymond Keene winning).

Wade qualified for the Saltsjöbaden Interzonal 1952, scored 6/20, and did not advance to the Candidates level. Wade defeated many-time Scottish champion William Fairhurst in a match at Glasgow 1953 by 5½–2½.

Wade went on to represent his adopted country in six Chess Olympiads, and his country of birth on one occasion. In 92 games, his totals at this level are: (+30−26=36), for 52.2 per cent. His detailed results in Olympiads, from olimpbase.org, follow.

- Amsterdam 1954, England board 4, 6/12 (+4−4=4);
- Moscow 1956, England board 3, 6½/14 (+2−3=9);
- Munich 1958, England 1st reserve, 7/14 (+5−5=4);
- Leipzig 1960, England 2nd reserve, 6/11 (+4−3=4);
- Varna 1962, England 2nd reserve, 6/12 (+4−4=4);
- Siegen 1970, New Zealand board 2, 9/15 (+7−4=4);
- Skopje 1972, England board 3, 7½/14 (+4−3=7).

Wade won several middle-strength Master events in the British Isles: Ilford 1957 and 1968, Paignton 1959, Dublin 1962, and Southend-on-Sea 1965.

Wade was generally no more than a middle-ranking player in strong international tournaments. His other highlights against high-standard international-level competition include:

- tied 4–5th at Haifa/Tel Aviv 1958 on 7½/13 (winner Samuel Reshevsky);
- 3rd at Bognor Regis 1959 on 7/10 (winner Erno Gereben);
- 5th at Reykjavík 1964 on 7½/13 (winner Mikhail Tal);
- tied 4–5th at Málaga 1966 on 7/11; (winners Alberic O'Kelly de Galway and Eleazar Jiménez);
- 6th at Briseck 1971 on 7/13 (winner Gideon Barcza);
- 5th at Cienfuegos 'B' 1975 on 10/17; (winners Julio Boudy and Amador Rodríguez Céspedes);
- tied 7–12th in the World Senior Championship, Bad Woerishofen 1992, on 7½/11 (winner Efim Geller).

Wade was the only British player to have faced Bobby Fischer in tournament play (outside of Olympiads). They met three times, with Wade drawing one game and losing the other two.

== Later years ==
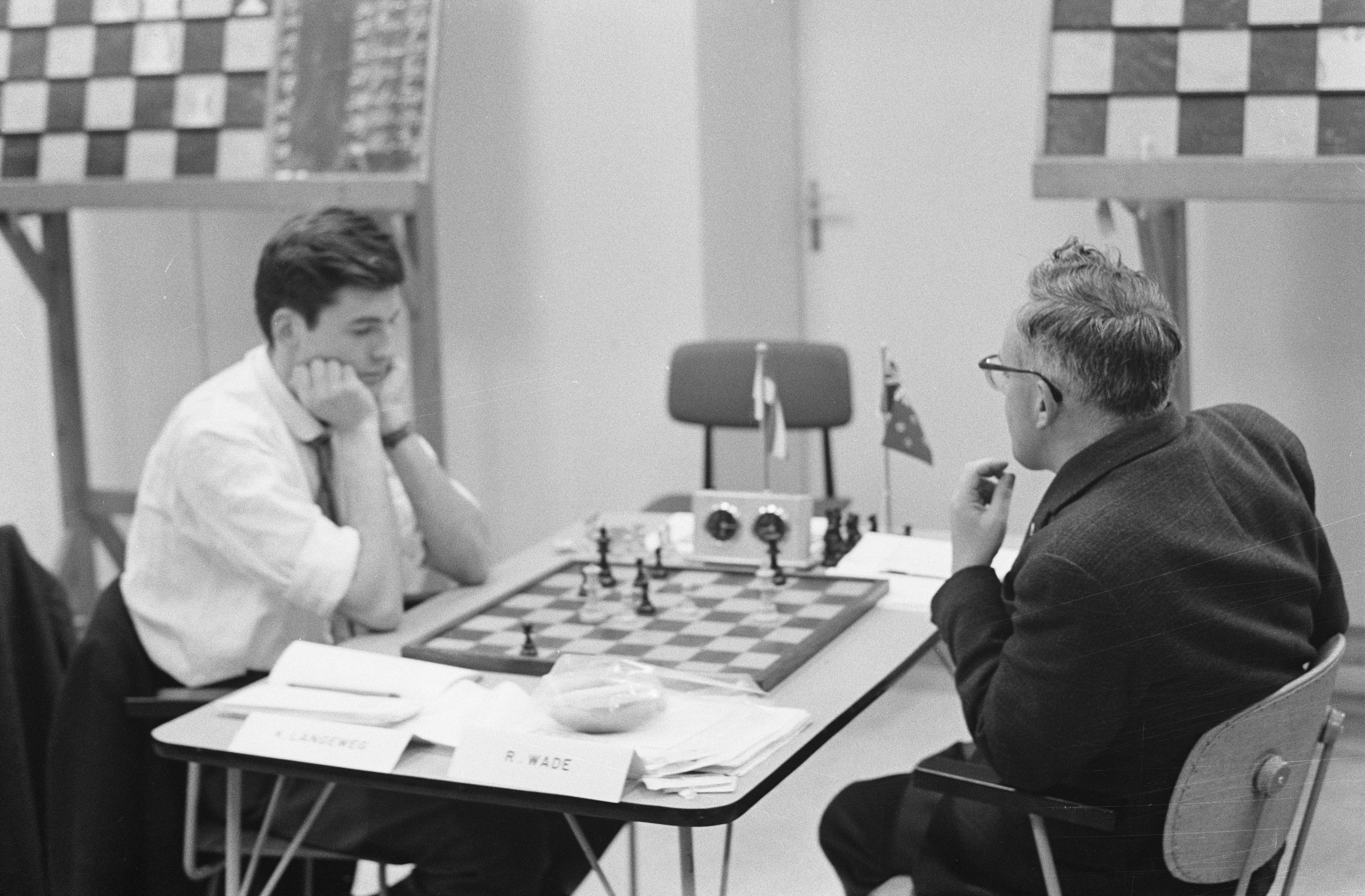
Robert Wade (right) vs. Kick Langeweg (IBM international chess tournament 1961)

Wade earned the title of International Arbiter in 1958, and made much of his living from directing events. He defeated tournament winner Viktor Korchnoi at Buenos Aires 1960 in a tough game that went through a Queen and Rook middle game to a queen endgame to a final king and pawn endgame. In addition to staying active on the international circuit, Wade served as chess editor with the respected Batsford publishers in the 1960s and 1970s. He eventually retired to make way for Raymond Keene. He managed the Batsford Chess Library after this. Well respected as a chess coach and author, Wade helped Bobby Fischer prepare for his 1972 World Championship match with Boris Spassky by collating a special file of Spassky's games. He was awarded an OBE for services to chess in 1979. He was made an 'Honorary Member' of FIDE, the World Chess Federation. He declined to "trade in" his International Master title for that of honorary Grandmaster, considering his title, awarded in the days before title inflation, far more valuable.

Continuing to be an active player into his 80s, Wade was still able to play at a high level. This is shown by his performance at the 2006 Queenstown Chess International, where he scored 6/10 with only one loss, and drew his game against Grandmaster Murray Chandler. Wade played in the European Senior Teams chess championship six times between 2002 and 2006. His last major event was the Staunton Memorial in London in July 2008, where he was badly outrated (a single draw would have increased his Elo rating), and he fought gamely but scored 0/11. A few weeks before his death, he played his final serious game, for the Athenaeum Chess Club.

Wade built up an enormous chess library at his house in South London, which included books, magazines and many original bulletins from tournaments: these latter were the primary sources for many types of chess literature. The growth of this library was supported by B.T. Batsford. Eventually the library was given to the nation, though its eventual destination is not certain at present. In the days before computer databases the Wade library was often used by British and foreign players in preparation for matches.

Wade was hospitalized on 26 November 2008, with severe pneumonia and died on 29 November 2008.

== Opening theory ==
Wade was an early advocate of the chess opening 1.d4 d6 2.Nf3 Bg4 and played it for more than 30 years. The opening, now known as the Wade Defence, has been adopted by a number of grandmasters and is named after Wade in recognition of his contributions to its development.

== Selected bibliography ==
- Winter, William; Wade, Robert G. (1951). The World Chess Championship: 1951 Botvinnik vs Bronstein. Turnstile Press.
- Wade, Robert G. (1964). The World Chess Championship: 1963 Botvinnik vs Petrosian. Arco Pub Co.
- Wade, Robert G. (compiler) (1968). Soviet Chess. David McKay Co. Inc.
- Wade, Robert G.; O'Connell, Kevin J. (1972). The Games of Robert J. Fischer. Batsford. ISBN 0-7134-2099-5.
- Wade, Robert G.; Blackstock, L. S.; Kotov, A. (1974). World Championship Interzonals: Leningrad and Petropolis 1973. RHM Chess Pub.
- Wade, Robert G.; Gligoric, Svetozar (1974). The World Chess Championship. Batsford.
- Wade, Robert G.; Harding, T. D. (1974). The Marshall Attack. HarperCollins.
- Korchnoi, Viktor; Wade, Robert G.; Blackstock, L. S. (1978). Korchnoi's 400 Best Games. Arco Pub Co.
- Kasparov, Garry; Wade, Robert G. (1988). Fighting Chess. Batsford.
