= Henry Ernest Atkins =

British chess master (1872–1955)

Personal information
- Born: 20 August 1872 Leicester, England
- Died: 31 January 1955 (aged 82) Huddersfield, England

Chess career
- Country: England
- Title: International Master (1950)

Henry Ernest Atkins (20 August 1872 – 31 January 1955) was a British chess master who is best known for his unparalleled record of winning the British Chess Championship nine times in eleven attempts. He won every year from 1905 to 1911, and again in 1924 and 1925. A schoolmaster, Atkins treated chess as a hobby, devoting relatively little time to it and playing in only a handful of international tournaments. He was an extremely gifted player who would likely have become one of the world's leading players had he pursued the game more single-mindedly. FIDE, the World Chess Federation, awarded him the International Master title in 1950 in recognition of his past achievements.

== Non-chess life ==
Born in Leicester, Atkins was educated at Wyggeston Grammar School for Boys. In 1890, he went to Peterhouse, Cambridge, as a mathematical scholar. He was a mathematical master at Northampton College from 1898 to 1902 and at the Wyggeston School from 1902 to 1909. He was then appointed principal of what later became Huddersfield New College in 1909, serving in that position until 1936.

Atkins died on 31 January 1955 in Huddersfield, England.

== Chess career ==
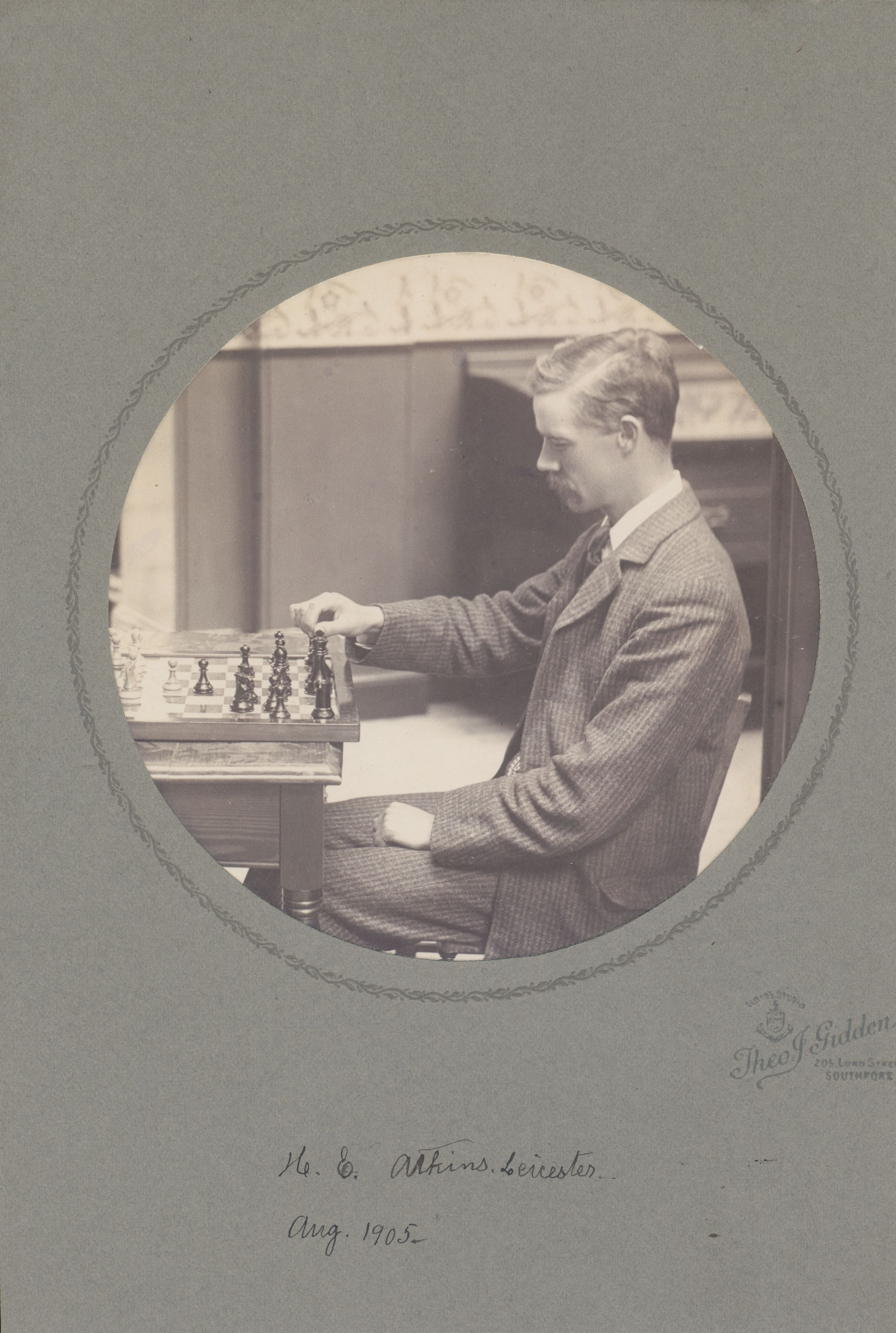
Atkins in August 1905

Atkins is considered by many to be Britain's most talented player ever. A schoolmaster who played chess only in his spare time, he nonetheless became one of the strongest amateur players. He made a deep study of the games of Wilhelm Steinitz, and modeled his play so closely on Steinitz's that he became known on the European continent as "der kleine Steinitz" ("the little Steinitz").

Atkins learned chess from one of his brothers, and joined the Wyggeston School Chess Club at age 10. One of his sisters gave him a copy of Howard Staunton's treatise The Chess-Player's Handbook, which he closely studied. At the age of 15, he joined the Leicester Chess Club and within two years was playing on the first board. While in college, he also played on first board for Cambridge University. In four years playing for Cambridge he only lost one match game.

Between 1895 and 1901, Atkins played in seven minor tournaments, winning four and finishing second or equal second in the others, and losing just 3 out of 70 games. These included the minor tournament at the great Hastings 1895 tournament, where he finished equal second, behind Géza Maróczy, and was awarded the Newnes Cup for the best result by a British amateur. At Bristol 1896, he yielded just one draw in nine games. At Southampton 1897, the Eighth British Amateur Championship, he scored an undefeated 8.5 points out of 10 possible, retaining his British amateur title. At Craigside 1899, he scored 7.5/10, behind Amos Burn (9/10). At Amsterdam 1899, an amateur tournament that was Atkins' first international appearance, he achieved a rare perfect score, winning all 15 games and finishing 4 points ahead of the second-place finisher. He scored 4/6, again finishing behind Burn (5/6), at Birmingham 1899. At Bath 1900, he scored 12.5/14, yielding just 3 draws in 14 games. At Llandudno 1901, a four-man double-round robin, Atkins was again bested by Burn, who scored 4.5/6 to Atkins' 3.5 points. Between 1896 and 1911, Atkins participated in the annual 10-board cable match between Britain and the United States every year except 1909.

Atkins' best-ever result came at his first major international tournament, Hanover 1902. He finished third with 11.5/17 (8 wins, 7 draws and just 2 losses), behind David Janowski (13.5 points) and Harry Nelson Pillsbury (12 points), but ahead of Mikhail Chigorin and Frank Marshall, among others. Chessmetrics ranks Pillsbury number 2 in the world at the time; Chigorin had played matches for the World Chess Championship in 1889 and 1892, and Marshall and Janowski would go on to do so in 1907 and 1910, respectively. Although Atkins could at this point have considered making chess his career, he did not, and indeed played in no international tournaments for the next 20 years because "he 'never found it possible again to play'".

His record in the British Chess Championship is without parallel. Atkins played eleven times, winning in all but his first and last attempts. He first played at Hastings 1904, the first Championship organized by the newly formed British Chess Federation. He tied for first with William Ewart Napier, each scoring 8.5/11. However, Atkins lost the playoff (3 draws, 1 loss) and was thus relegated to second place. Remarkably, this was to be Atkins' worst result in the Championship for a third of a century. He proceeded to win the next seven Championships: Southport 1905 and Shrewsbury 1906, again scoring 8.5/11 each time; Crystal Palace 1907 (7.5/11); Tunbridge Wells 1908 (8/11); Scarborough 1909, where he tied for first with Joseph Henry Blake, each scoring 8.5/11, but won the playoff with 2.5/3; Oxford 1910 (8.5/11); and Glasgow 1911, tying for first with Frederick Yates at 8.5/11, and winning all three games in the playoff. Coles writes, "His success in these years was all the more striking because of his lack of other first-class practice, which not infrequently caused him to get away to a bad start; yet such was his natural ability and determination that he invariably overhauled the field before the end as confidence and skill returned." Atkins wrote the introduction to the first edition of Modern Chess Openings (1911).

After the 1911 Championship, Atkins retired completely from tournament chess for the next 11 years. He later remarked, "I really can't say why I didn't play after 1911 for so many years." He had agreed to play in the 1919 Hastings Victory Congress, but withdrew at the last moment "by doctor's orders". In 1922, a major international tournament was organized in London, the first in almost a quarter of a century; many of the world's leading players agreed to compete, such as newly crowned World Champion José Raúl Capablanca, Alexander Alekhine, and Akiba Rubinstein. Despite his long layoff from the game, Atkins was also invited, and agreed to play. After such a long hiatus, he unsurprisingly had a disappointing tournament, scoring only 6/15 and finishing 10th out of 16 players. He finished just outside the prize list, for the first and only time in his career. However, did have the consolation of claiming among his victims Rubinstein and Savielly Tartakower.

His appetite for competition having been stirred, he returned to the British Championship, playing at Southport in 1924. This time he showed his old form, winning his eighth championship with his usual score of 8.5/11. The following year, he exceeded himself, winning at Stratford-on-Avon with his best-ever score of 9.5/11 (8 wins, 3 draws). His final Championship appearance was in 1937, when he tied for third at the age of 65.

Atkins also represented England at the Chess Olympiads of 1927 and 1935. Playing first board for England in the London 1927 Olympiad, he scored 3 wins, 8 draws, and 1 loss (58.4%), leading the English team to what author Árpád Földeák calls an "unexpected but well deserved" third-place finish. England did not place this high again until Haifa 1976. At age 63, he played fourth board for England at the Warsaw 1935 Olympiad, scoring 3 wins, 6 draws, and 4 losses (46.2%).

G. H. Diggle recollected of Atkins:

... we well remember his giving a "simultaneous" at the Lincoln Chess Club in 1924, winning 17 and drawing two. One of his more elderly opponents (a notorious non-resigner) who for 30 moves had been wobbling along with a piece down until "time" had to be called, then proceeded to "demonstrate a draw" by concocting a continuation so optimistic that even clubmates with lifelong experience of his powers stood aghast. Atkins, with his greatcoat on ready to go home, made no attempt to refute this analytical masterpiece but merely remarked with great deference: "I don't think we can play it quite like that!" and then beat a craven retreat "escorted by Club Officials".

An unobtrusive man, we last saw him as a spectator at "Nottingham, 1936" wandering about as if he was nobody.

== Contribution to chess theory ==
Atkins originated an important defensive strategy in the Queen's Gambit Declined: an early ...Ne4 by Black in order to exchange off a pair of minor pieces and ease the pressure on Black's position. He played it successfully against Marshall in a 1902 cable match between England and the United States, the game beginning 1.d4 d5 2.c4 e6 3.Nc3 Nf6 4.Bg5 Be7 5.Nf3 Nbd7 6.e3 Ne4. (See "Notable games" section below.) Today, the ...Ne4 maneuver is generally referred to as the "Lasker Variation", after Emanuel Lasker, who later adopted it, but is also sometimes referred to as the "Atkins Variation". Today, Black usually employs a different move order, such as 1.d4 d5 2.c4 e6 3.Nc3 Nf6 4.Bg5 Be7 5.e3 0-0 6.Nf3 and now either 6...h6 7.Bh4 Ne4, or immediately 6...Ne4.

== Playing strength ==
In 1950, FIDE, in its first award of international titles, awarded Atkins the International Master title in recognition of his past achievements. By Arpad Elo's calculation, Atkins' strength during his five-year peak was equivalent to an Elo rating of 2540.

World Champion Emanuel Lasker believed that if Atkins had devoted more time to chess, he would have become one of the world's leading players. Sir George Thomas, one of Britain's leading players in the first half of the 20th century, observed, "H. E. Atkins ranks, indisputably, as the greatest figure in English chess since Amos Burn, and only lack of opportunity prevented him, in my opinion, from definitely establishing his position in the world championship class." Anne Sunnucks writes that, "His devotion to teaching and his insistence on treating chess as merely a game was all that prevented him from becoming one of the leading players of the world."

== Notable games ==
Position: h1 white rook, d1 white queen, a1 white king, h2 white pawn, g2 white pawn, d2 white rook, b2 white pawn, f3 white bishop, e3 white pawn, b4 white pawn, a4 white pawn, a5 black pawn, e6 black bishop, c6 black pawn, a6 black rook, h7 black pawn, g7 black pawn, f7 black pawn, e7 black queen, g8 black king, b8 black rook

"Tartakower–Atkins". after 29.cxb4

Position: h1 white rook, d1 white queen, h2 white pawn, g2 white pawn, a2 black rook, e3 white pawn, c3 white king, a5 black pawn, e6 black bishop, d6 white rook, c6 white bishop, h7 black pawn, g7 black pawn, f7 black pawn, e7 black queen, g8 black king, c8 black rook

Tartakower–Atkins, position after 36.Bc6

Atkins (Black) won the following game at London 1922 against Savielly Tartakower (White), then one of the world's leading players. Tartakower thought highly enough of the game to include it in his book 500 Master Games of Chess.
1.e4 e5 2.Nf3 Nc6 3.Bc4 Nf6 4.Nc3 Nxe4 5.Nxe4 d5 6.Bd3 dxe4 7.Bxe4 Bd6 8.d4 Nxd4 9.Nxd4 exd4 10.Qxd4 O-O 11.Be3 Qe7 12.O-O-O Re8 13.Bd5? This allows Black to gain time for his queen-side pawn storm with ...c6. Correct was 13.Bf3. Be5 14.Qa4 c6 15.Bf3 Be6 16.Kb1 a5! With the surprising threat of 17...Qb4! 18.Qxb4 axb4 19.b3 Rxa2! and wins. 17.Bd4 Bd6 18.Bb6? Bb4 Threatening to drive away the bishop with ...Ra6, followed by ...b5 winning the queen. 19.c3 Ra6! Now if 20.cxb4, axb4 is devastating. 20.Be3 Bf5+ 21.Ka1 b5 22.Qb3 Bd6 23.a4? Instead of weakening his queen-side with this move, White should have played 23. Rd2. Rb8 24.Rd2 Be6 25.Qd1 Be5 26.Bd4 Bf4 27.Be3 Bxe3 28.fxe3 b4! 29.cxb4 Rab6! Tartakower and du Mont remark, "Black conducts the game with superb élan." Weak would have been 29...Rxb4?? 30.Rd8+; 29...Qxb4? 30.Rd8+; or 29...axb4 30.b3, keeping the queen-side closed. 30.Rd6 Black's attack has become overwhelming. If 30.bxa5, Rxb2! wins. Or 30.Rd4 Rxb4 31.Rxb4 Qxb4 32.Qc2 Bb3 33.Qxc6 Bc4 34.Rb1 Bd3 and wins. Rxb4 31.Bxc6 Rxb2 Threatening 31...Ra2#. If 32.Rxe6, Qa3#! 32.Bb5 Ra2+ 33.Kb1 Rxa4! 34.Kc2 White tries to escape; if instead 34.Qxa4 Qxd6, White will lose the bishop on b5. Ra2+ 35.Kc3 Rc8+ 36.Bc6 Rxc6+! Tartakower and du Mont observe, "This curious break-through sacrifice is the crowning touch to a powerfully conducted game." 37.Rxc6 Qb4+ 38.Kd3 Qb5+ 39.Kd4 Qxc6 40.Ke5 Qc5+ 41.Kf4 Qf5+ 42.Kg3 Qf2# Oddly, White's king rook never moved.

Here, using his novel ...Ne4 maneuver in the Queen's Gambit Declined, Atkins routs the young American star Frank Marshall:
Marshall-Atkins, USA v. England cable match 1902 1.d4 d5 2.c4 e6 3.Nc3 Nf6 4.Bg5 Be7 5.Nf3 Nbd7 6.e3 Ne4 7.Bxe7 Qxe7 8.Nxe4 dxe4 9.Nd2 f5 10.Be2 O-O 11.O-O e5 12.d5? Rf6! 13.a3? Rh6 14.g3 Qg5 15.Qb3 Rh3 16.Kg2? Qh6! 17.Rh1 Nf6 18.Qc2 Bd7 19.Kg1 f4! 20.exf4 exf4 21.Nxe4 Nxe4 22.Qxe4 Re8 23.Qf3 fxg3 24.fxg3 Qb6+! 25.c5 Qxc5+ 26.Qf2 Qxd5 27.Rd1 Qe6 28.Bf3 Bc6 29.Bxc6 Qxc6 30.Rf1 Qd7 31.Qxa7 b6 32.Qb7 Rh6 33.Qf3 Rf6 34.Qb3+ Kh8 35.Rxf6 gxf6 36.Qf3 Qd2! 0-1
