= Irénée Beaubien =

Canadian Jesuit priest (1916–2017)

Irénée Beaubien OC SJ
- Born: January 20, 1916; Shawinigan, Quebec, Canada
- Died: May 15, 2017 (aged 101); Richelieu, Quebec, Canada
- Occupation: Jesuit priest
- Known for: Ecumenical work
- Awards: Officer of the Order of Canada (2003); Pro Ecclesia et Pontifice (2012)

Irénée Beaubien OC SJ (January 20, 1916 - May 15, 2017) was a Canadian Jesuit priest and a pioneer of ecumenism in Canada. His work promoted closer relations among Christian churches.

Beaubien was born in Shawinigan, Quebec, on January 20, 1916, and was one of eleven children. In 1949 he was ordained as a Catholic priest in the Society of Jesus. He founded the Catholic Forum, the Canadian Centre for Ecumenism and Sentiers de Foi. He also represented Canada's bishops at numerous international meetings. Beaubien died in Richelieu, Quebec, on May 15, 2017, aged 101.

== Honors ==
- 2003: Officer of the Order of Canada
- 2012: Pro Ecclesia et Pontifice, awarded by Pope Benedict XVI
