= Kate Belinda Finn =

British chess player (1864–1932)

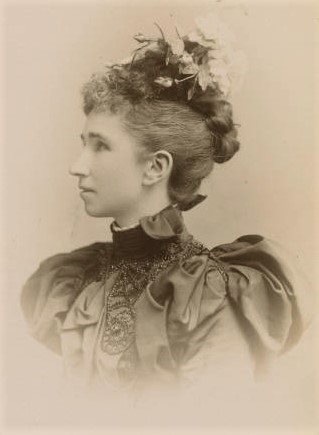
- Kate Belinda Finn was the first Women's British Champion in 1904, and defended the title the following year.

Personal information
- Born: 16 December 1864 Cork, Ireland
- Died: 8 March 1932 (aged 67) London, England

Chess career
- Country: Ireland
- Title: British Women's Chess Champion
- Peak rating: 2095 (1905)

Catherine Belinda Finn (born 16 December 1864 in Cork; died 8 March 1932 in London) was a British chess player. She became the first British Women's Chess Champion in 1904 and defended her title in 1905.

== Life ==
She was the only daughter of Eugene Finn, MD and his wife Belinda, née McCarthy. After the death of her father she lived together with her mother, who died in 1906, in well-off conditions in the London district of Kensington. Later, she lived with a younger woman, Eileen Florence Hodson Moriarty (1880–1945). Finn died of pneumonia at age 67. She left a fortune of £ 6,000.

== Chess career ==
She learned the game of chess from her mother, who often accompanied her to tournaments. Kate Finn was a founding member of the Ladies' Chess Club, which was launched in January 1895 in London. In the following months, the club members played several friendly matches against other clubs. Four members participated in a women's tournament organized during the Chess tournament at Hastings in 1895. It was won by Lady Edith Thomas, Finn finished fourth. In the summer of 1897, Finn took part in the first international women's tournament, held in London and won by Mary Rudge. There were 32 entries for the tournament, from which 20 participants were selected. After eight rounds in which she scored 3.5 points, Finn did not continue playing, because warm weather and the tight schedule of 19 rounds in 11 days proved to be too exhausting for her. In June 1900, Finn won the B tournament at the Annual Congress of the Kent Chess Association, in which four men and two women participated, with 4 points from 5 games. In March 1901 she won the championship of the Ladies' Chess Club. In a simultaneous exhibition on 25 boards, given by Isidor Gunsberg in December 1902, Finn was the only participant to win her game.

At the 1904 British Championship in Hastings, which was organized by the newly formed British Chess Federation, she scored 10.5 points in 11 games and won with three points ahead of the runner-up. She received a cash prize of £ 10 and a gold medal. Subsequently, an illustrated article about her appeared in the British Chess Magazine (1904, pp. 399-400). This was the most comprehensive report to date about a female chess player in this magazine. A year later, Finn was able to defend the title of national champion in Southport. This time she scored 9.5 points and again remained unbeaten. She did not attend the championship in 1906 because of a serious illness of her mother.

In the women's tournament as part of the international chess tournament in Ostend 1907 she tied for first place with Grace Curling and apparently won a later tiebreak match with one win and two draws. In 1911, Finn won another international women's tournament, organized by Theodor von Scheve in Sanremo. The first prize was 1.000 francs. Tournament table and games are not known.

In later years, her eyesight diminished and her overall health deteriorated. Despite that, she played in team competitions for the Imperial Chess Club in the London League until 1931.

The playing strength of Kate Finn is difficult to estimate, because only a few of her games are preserved. According to retrospective calculations, her best historical Elo rating was 2095 in the year 1905.

In 1903, the Wiener Schachzeitung printed one of her games from a tournament in Plymouth, which she lost to Wilfred Charles Palmer (1873-1914) in only 10 moves. This prompted the following remark by the editor: "This rapid defeat is likely to mislead some psychologists to regard the game as a valuable contribution to the popular chapter "Inferiority of Female Intelligence." On the other hand, Miss Finn is well acquainted with the intricacies of chess and has excelled on many previous occasions."

Among the notable male chess players she defeated in tournament games are Rudolf Loman (1903), Georg Schories (1905) and George Alan Thomas (1906).
