= Melanie Buckley =

English chess player (born 1982)

Personal information
- Born: 31 July 1982 (age 43)

Chess career
- Country: England
- Peak rating: 2184 (July 2002)

Melanie H. Buckley (born 31 July 1982) is an English chess player, British Women's Chess Championship winner (2001).

== Biography ==
In 1996, Melanie Buckley won British Girl's Chess Championship in U15 age group. In 2001, in Scarborough she won British Women's Chess Championship.

Melanie Buckley played for England in the Women's Chess Olympiad:

- In 2004, at first reserve board in the 36th Chess Olympiad (women) in Calvià (+2, =2, -1).

Since 2007, she has rarely participated in chess tournaments.
