= Amy Hoare =

English chess player (born 1996)

Personal information
- Born: 1996 (age 29–30) Horsham, England

Chess career
- Country: England
- Peak rating: 2088 (September 2015)

Amy B. Hoare is an English chess player.

== Chess career ==
She played for the Horsham Chess Club and was the U18 British Girls Champion.

In July 2013, she played for England in the European Youth Team Championship.

In July 2014, she won the British Women's Chess Championship.

In December 2020, she scored a win against former Women's World Chess Champion Anna Ushenina at the European Women's Club Cup.
