= Ernest Klein (chess player) =

British-Austrian chess player

Personal information
- Born: 1910 Vienna
- Died: 1990 (aged 79–80)

Ernest Ludwig Klein (1910–1990) was an Austrian-British chess master and author.

Born in Vienna into a Jewish family, he emigrated to the United Kingdom in 1930s. He tied for 3rd-4th at Győr 1930 (Isaac Kashdan won), lost a match to Savielly Tartakower (1 : 3) at Paris 1935, tied for 4-5th at Margate 1935 (Samuel Reshevsky), and was unofficial Alexander Alekhine's second in his World Championship match against Max Euwe in 1935.

He tied for 5-6th at Hastings 1938/39 (László Szabó won), shared 2nd with Salo Flohr, behind Euwe, at Bournemouth 1939.

After World War II, he tied for 9-10th at Birmingham 1951 (Staunton Memorial, won by Petar Trifunović and Vasja Pirc), and won the British Championship in 1951.
