= Akshaya Kalaiyalahan =

British chess player (born 2001)

Personal information
- Born: 28 August 2001 (age 24)

Chess career
- Country: England
- Title: FIDE Master (2016)
- Peak rating: 2288 (July 2016)

Akshaya Kalaiyalahan (born 28 August 2001) is a British chess player. She has won the Women's British Chess Championship twice, in 2013 and 2015. She competed in the 41st Chess Olympiad in Norway and the 42nd Chess Olympiad in Baku, Azerbaijan representing the England Women's team. As of January 2021, her rating was 2149 and she had been awarded the title of FIDE Master.
