= British Chess Championship =

Chess tournament

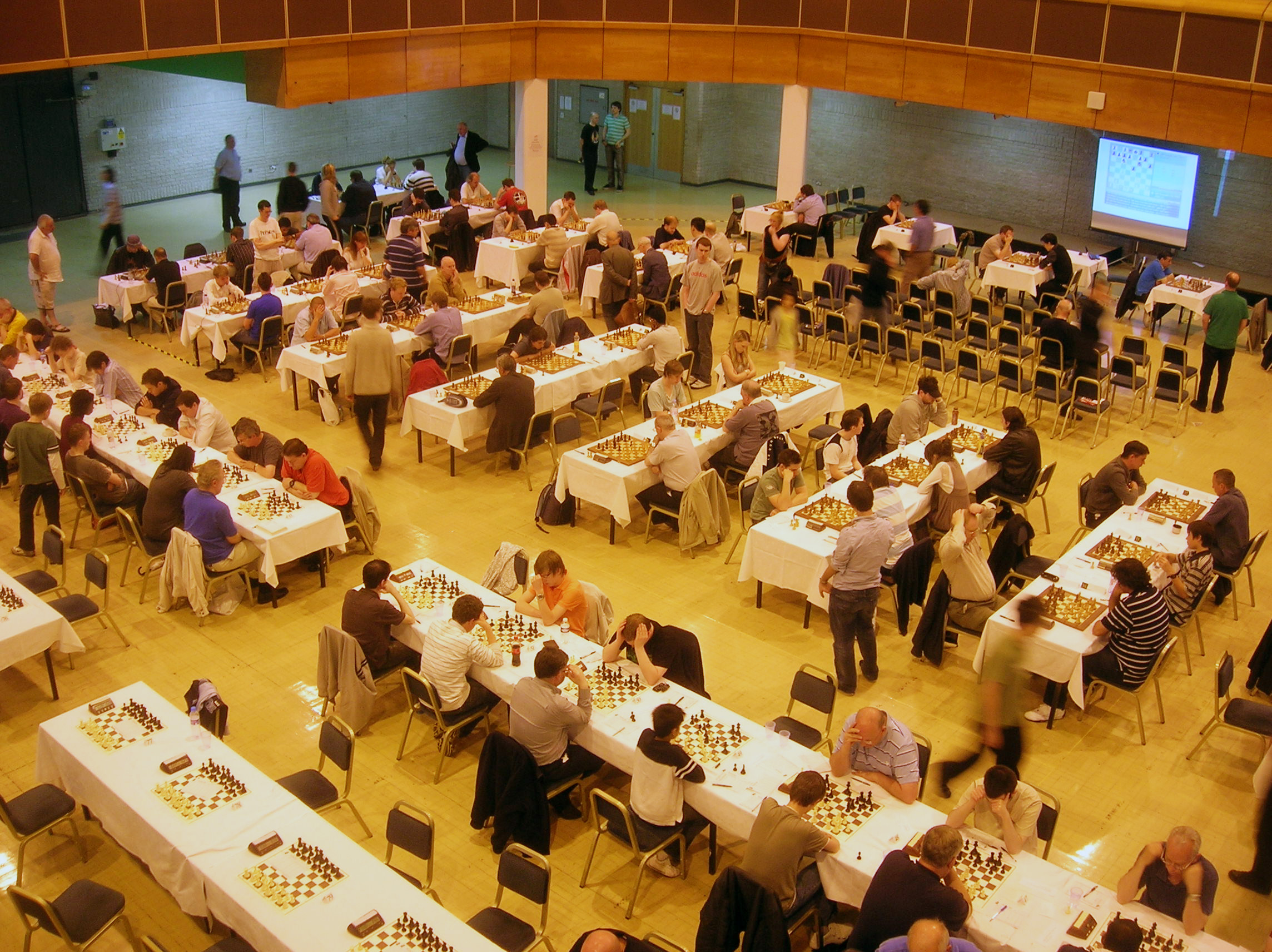
British Chess Championship, Torquay 2009

The British Chess Championships are organised by the English Chess Federation. The main tournament incorporates the British Championship, the English Chess Championships and the British Women's Chess Championship so it is possible, although it has never happened, for one player to win all three titles in the same competition. The English Women's Chess Championship was also incorporated into this event but did not take place in 2015 and was held as a separate competition in 2016. Since 1923 there have been sections for juniors, and since 1982 there has been an over-sixty championship. The championship venue usually changes every year and has been held in different locations in England, Scotland, Wales and once on the Isle of Man.

The championship was originally open to citizens of any Commonwealth country and has previously been won by Mir Sultan Khan (India) and Abe Yanofsky (Canada). After the Indian R. B. Ramesh finished first in 2002 and several other Indians took top prizes at the same event, many top Britons declined to compete in the 2003 championship. Following the victory of Indian Abhijit Kunte in 2003 and criticism that the British Championship was not serving the interests of British players, it was announced that starting in 2004 only British and Irish players would be eligible to take part. Players excluded by these rules are however welcome to participate in the Commonwealth Chess Championship.

== BCA Congress (1857–1861) ==
These were the first large tournaments organised by the British Chess Association, international players were allowed to participate.

Year	City	Winner
1857	Manchester	Johann Löwenthal (Austrian Empire) / Hungary
1858	Birmingham	Johann Löwenthal (Austrian Empire) / Hungary
1860	Cambridge	Ignaz von Kolisch (Austrian Empire) / Hungary
1861	Bristol	Louis Paulsen (Germany) / Lippe

== London international tournaments (1862–1883) ==
In July 1862, Adolf Anderssen won the first international tournament organized by the British Chess Association (BCF Congress), held in London. Second place went to Louis Paulsen, followed by John Owen. This was the first round-robin tournament. In August 1872, Wilhelm Steinitz won the second British Chess Federation international tourney, held in London. Second place went to Joseph Henry Blackburne. The great London 1883 chess tournament was won convincingly by Johannes Zukertort (22 points ouf of 26) ahead of Steinitz (19/26).

#	Year	City	Winner
1*	1862	London	Adolf Anderssen (Germany) / (Kingdom of Prussia) Prussia
2*	1872	London	Wilhelm Steinitz (Austria-Hungary) / Bohemia
3*	1883	London	Johannes Zukertort (German Empire) / Poland

== BCA Congress (1885–1899) ==
In 1884, a new British Chess Association was inaugurated. In July 1885, Isidor Gunsberg won the first British Chess Association championship in London. In August 1886, Blackburne and Amos Burn tied for first in the second British Chess Association championship, held in London. Blackburne won the play-off. In December 1887, Burn and Gunsberg tied for first in the third British Chess Association Congress in London.

#	Year	City	Winner
1	1885	London	Isidor Gunsberg (United Kingdom) / Hungary
2	1886	London	Joseph Henry Blackburne (United Kingdom) / England
3	1887	London	Amos Burn (United Kingdom) / England Isidor Gunsberg (United Kingdom) / Hungary
4	1888	Bradford	Isidor Gunsberg (United Kingdom) / Hungary
5	1889	London	Henry Bird (United Kingdom) / England
6	1890	Manchester	Siegbert Tarrasch (German Empire) / (Kingdom of Prussia) Prussia
7	1892	London	Emanuel Lasker (German Empire) / (Kingdom of Prussia) Prussia
8	1895	Hastings	Harry Nelson Pillsbury (United States)
9	1899	London	Emanuel Lasker (German Empire) / (Kingdom of Prussia) Prussia

== BCA Challenge Cup (1866–1872) ==
The first British Championship was organized by the British Chess Association as an event at the 1866 London Congress. A rule awarded the B.C.A. Challenge Cup permanently to a player who won two consecutive titles. John Wisker accomplished this in 1872 by defeating Cecil De Vere in a play-off. The British Championship was then discontinued until 1904.

Year	City	Winner
1866	London	Cecil De Vere (Scotland)
1869	London	Joseph Henry Blackburne (England)
1870	London	John Wisker (England)
1872	London	John Wisker (England)

== British Amateur Championship (1886–1902) ==
Ten amateur championships were held between 1886 and 1902, but they did not include the strongest players and were unrepresentative, especially in the earlier years.

Year	City	Winner
1886	London	Walter Montague Gattie
1887	London	Charles Dealtry Locock
1888	Bradford	Anthony Alfred Geoffrey Guest
1889	London	George Edward Wainwright
1890	Manchester	Daniel Yarnton Mills
1892	London	E. Jones-Bateman
1895	Hastings	Henry Ernest Atkins
1897	Southampton	Henry Ernest Atkins
1900	Bath	Henry Ernest Atkins
1902	Norwich	Reginald Pryce Michell

== British Championship (1904–present) ==
The current championship series was begun by the British Chess Federation in 1904. The championship was not held in war years. It was also not held in 1919, 1922, 1927, and 1930 as major international events were then being held in England. José Raúl Capablanca won the BCF Victory Congress held in Hastings 1919 and the 1922 London International tournament, Alexander Alekhine won the 16th BCC Major Open at Portsmouth/Southsea 1923, Aron Nimzowitsch and Savielly Tartakower won at London 1927, and Edgard Colle won at Scarborough 1930. In 1939 the championship was also not held as the British team was in Buenos Aires for the 8th Chess Olympiad. In that time, Max Euwe won an international tournament at Bournemouth 1939, played during the BCC. The women's championship was held in most of those years.

Year	City	Men's Champion	Women's Champion
1904	Hastings	William Ewart Napier	Kate Belinda Finn
1905	Southport	Henry Ernest Atkins	Kate Belinda Finn
1906	Shrewsbury	Henry Ernest Atkins	Frances Dunn Herring (née Gwilliam)
1907	London	Henry Ernest Atkins	Frances Dunn Herring (née Gwilliam)
1908	Tunbridge Wells	Henry Ernest Atkins	Grace Curling (née Ellis)
1909	Scarborough	Henry Ernest Atkins	Gertrude Alison Anderson
1910	Oxford	Henry Ernest Atkins	Mary Mills Houlding
1911	Glasgow	Henry Ernest Atkins	Mary Mills Houlding
1912	Richmond	Richard Griffith	Gertrude Alison Anderson
1913	Cheltenham	Frederick Yates	Amabel Nevill Moseley (née Jeffreys)
1914	Chester	Frederick Yates	Mary Mills Houlding
1915–1918	–	no contest	no contest
1919	Hastings	no contest	Edith Holloway
1920	Edinburgh	Roland Scott	Agnes Stevenson (née Lawson)
1921	Malvern	Frederick Yates	Gertrude Alison Anderson
1922	London	no contest	Edith Charlotte Price
1923	Southsea	George Alan Thomas	Edith Charlotte Price
1924	Southport	Henry Ernest Atkins	Edith Charlotte Price
1925	Stratford-upon-Avon	Henry Ernest Atkins	Agnes Stevenson (née Lawson)
1926	Edinburgh	Frederick Yates	Agnes Stevenson (née Lawson)
1927	–	no contest	no contest
1928	Tenby	Frederick Yates	Edith Charlotte Price
1929	Ramsgate	Mir Sultan Khan	Mary Dinorah Gilchrist
1930	Scarborough	no contest	Agnes Stevenson (née Lawson)
1931	Worcester	Frederick Yates	Edith Michell (née Tapsell); Amy Eleanor Wheelwright
1932	London	Mir Sultan Khan	Edith Michell (née Tapsell)
1933	Hastings	Mir Sultan Khan	Miss Fatima
1934	Chester	George Alan Thomas	Mary Dinorah Gilchrist
1935	Great Yarmouth	William Winter	Edith Michell (née Tapsell)
1936	Bournemouth (M); Nottingham (W)	William Winter	Edith Holloway
1937	Blackpool	William Fairhurst	Rowena Mary Dew
1938	Brighton	C. H. O'D. Alexander	Minnie Musgrave
1939	Bournemouth	no contested Championship	Elaine Saunders
1940–1945	–	no contest	no contest
1946	Nottingham	Robert Forbes Combe	Elaine Saunders
1947	Harrogate	Harry Golombek	Eileen Betsy Tranmer
1948	London	Reginald Broadbent	Edith Charlotte Price
1949	Felixstowe	Harry Golombek	Eileen Betsy Tranmer
1950	Buxton	Reginald Broadbent	Rowena Mary Bruce (née Dew)
1951	Swansea	Ernest Klein	Rowena Mary Bruce (née Dew)
1952	Chester	Robert Wade	no contest
1953	Hastings	Abraham Yanofsky	Eileen Betsy Tranmer
1954	Nottingham	Leonard Barden; Alan Phillips	Rowena Mary Bruce (née Dew)
1955	Aberystwyth	Harry Golombek	Joan Doulton; Rowena Mary Bruce (née Dew)
1956	Blackpool	C. H. O'D. Alexander	Elaine Pritchard (née Saunders)
1957	Plymouth	Stefan Fazekas	Anne Sunnucks
1958	Leamington	Jonathan Penrose	Anne Sunnucks
1959	York	Jonathan Penrose	Rowena Mary Bruce (née Dew)
1960	Leicester	Jonathan Penrose	Rowena Mary Bruce (née Dew)
1961	Aberystwyth	Jonathan Penrose	Eileen Betsy Tranmer
1962	Whitby	Jonathan Penrose	Rowena Mary Bruce (née Dew)
1963	Bath	Jonathan Penrose	Rowena Mary Bruce (née Dew)
1964	Whitby	Michael Haygarth	Anne Sunnucks
1965	Hastings	Peter Lee	Elaine Pritchard (née Saunders)
1966	Sunderland	Jonathan Penrose	Margaret Eileen Clarke; Gillian Moore
1967	Oxford	Jonathan Penrose	Rowena Mary Bruce (née Dew); Dinah Margaret Dobson
1968	Bristol	Jonathan Penrose	Dinah Margaret Dobson (later Mrs Norman)
1969	Rhyl	Jonathan Penrose	Rowena Mary Bruce (née Dew); Dinah Margaret Dobson
1970	Coventry	Robert Wade	Jana Hartston (née Malypetrova)
1971	Blackpool	Raymond Keene	Jana Hartston (née Malypetrova)
1972	Brighton	Brian Eley	Jana Hartston (née Malypetrova)
1973	Eastbourne	William Hartston	Jana Hartston (née Malypetrova)
1974	Clacton	George Botterill	Jana Hartston (née Malypetrova)
1975	Morecambe	William Hartston	Sheila Jackson
1976	Portsmouth	Jonathan Mestel	Jana Hartston (née Malypetrova)
1977	Brighton	George Botterill	Jana Hartston (née Malypetrova)
1978	Ayr	Jonathan Speelman	Sheila Jackson
1979	Chester	Robert Bellin	Jana Miles (née Malypetrova)
1980	Brighton	John Nunn	Sheila Jackson
1981	Morecambe	Paul Littlewood	Sheila Jackson
1982	Torquay	Tony Miles	Jane Garwell, Mrs Richmond
1983	Southport	Jonathan Mestel	Rani Hamid; Helen Milligan (née Scott)
1984	Brighton	Nigel Short	Bhagyashree Sathe (now Thipsay); Vasanti Unni (née Khadilkar)
1985	Edinburgh	Jonathan Speelman	Rani Hamid
1986	Southampton	Jonathan Speelman	Susan Arkell (née Walker, now Lalic)
1987	Swansea	Nigel Short	Cathy Forbes (now Warwick)
1988	Blackpool	Jonathan Mestel	Cathy Forbes (now Warwick)
1989	Plymouth	Michael Adams	Rani Hamid
1990	Eastbourne	James Plaskett	Susan Arkell (née Walker, now Lalic)
1991	Eastbourne	Julian Hodgson	Susan Arkell (née Walker, now Lalic)
1992	Plymouth	Julian Hodgson	Susan Arkell (née Walker, now Lalic)
1993	Dundee	Michael Hennigan	Saheli Dhar
1994	Norwich	William Watson	Cathy Forbes (now Warwick)
1995	Swansea	Matthew Sadler	Harriet Hunt
1996	Nottingham	Chris Ward	Harriet Hunt
1997	Hove	Michael Adams; Matthew Sadler	Harriet Hunt
1998	Torquay	Nigel Short	Susan Lalic (née Walker)
1999	Scarborough	Julian Hodgson	Harriet Hunt
2000	Street	Julian Hodgson	Humpy Koneru
2001	Scarborough	Joe Gallagher	Melanie Buckley
2002	Torquay	Ramachandran Ramesh	Humpy Koneru
2003	Edinburgh	Abhijit Kunte	Ketevan Arakhamia-Grant
2004	Scarborough	Jonathan Rowson	Ketevan Arakhamia-Grant
2005	Isle of Man	Jonathan Rowson	no contest
2006	Swansea	Jonathan Rowson	Ketevan Arakhamia-Grant
2007	Great Yarmouth	Jacob Aagaard	Ketevan Arakhamia-Grant
2008	Liverpool	Stuart Conquest	Jovanka Houska
2009	Torquay	David Howell	Jovanka Houska
2010	Canterbury	Michael Adams	Jovanka Houska
2011	Sheffield	Michael Adams	Jovanka Houska
2012	North Shields	Gawain Jones	Jovanka Houska
2013	Torquay	David Howell	Sarah Hegarty (now Longson); Akshaya Kalaiyalahan
2014	Aberystwyth	David Howell; Jonathan Hawkins	Amy Hoare
2015	Coventry	Jonathan Hawkins	Akshaya Kalaiyalahan
2016	Bournemouth	Michael Adams	Jovanka Houska
2017	Llandudno	Gawain Jones	Jovanka Houska
2018	Hull	Michael Adams	Jovanka Houska
2019	Torquay	Michael Adams	Jovanka Houska
2020	–	no contest	no contest
2021	Hull	Nicholas Pert	Harriet Hunt
2022	Torquay	Harry Grieve	Lan Yao
2023	Leicester	Michael Adams	Lan Yao
2024	Hull	Gawain Jones	Trisha Kanyamarala; Lan Yao
2025	Liverpool	Michael Adams	Lan Yao; Elmira Mirzayeva
2026	Coventry	Shreyas Royal	Bodhana Sivanandan

=== Multiple winners ===
The following players have won the tournament more than once.

Multiple winners
Player	Wins	Tournaments Won
Jonathan Penrose	10	1958, 1959, 1960, 1961, 1962, 1963, 1966, 1967, 1968, 1969
Henry Ernest Atkins	9	1905, 1906, 1907, 1908, 1909, 1910, 1911, 1924, 1925
Michael Adams	9 (1 shared)	1989, 1997 (shared), 2010, 2011, 2016, 2018, 2019, 2023, 2025
Frederick Yates	6	1913, 1914, 1921, 1926, 1928, 1931
Julian Hodgson	4	1991, 1992, 1999, 2000
Harry Golombek	3	1947, 1949, 1955
Gawain Jones	3	2012, 2017, 2024
Mir Sultan Khan	3	1929, 1932, 1933
Jonathan Mestel	3	1976, 1983, 1988
Nigel Short	3	1984, 1987, 1998
Jonathan Speelman	3	1978, 1985, 1986
David Howell	3 (1 shared)	2009, 2013, 2014 (shared)
C. H. O'D. Alexander	2	1938, 1956
George Botterill	2	1974, 1977
Reginald Broadbent	2	1948, 1950
William Hartston	2	1973, 1975
George Alan Thomas	2	1923, 1934
Robert Wade	2	1952, 1970
William Winter	2	1935, 1936
Jonathan Hawkins	2 (1 shared)	2014 (shared), 2015
Matthew Sadler	2 (1 shared)	1995, 1997 (shared)

== See also ==
- British Rapidplay Chess Championships
