= Michael Haygarth =

English chess player

Personal information
- Born: 11 October 1934 Leeds, England
- Died: 27 April 2016 (aged 81)

Chess career
- Country: England

Michael John Haygarth (11 October 1934 – 27 April 2016) was an English chess player, British Chess Championship winner (1964).

== Biography ==
From the late 1950s to the mid-1970s, Michael Haygarth was one of England's leading chess players. He was British Chess Championship multiplier participant (1955–1979), achieving good results. In 1959, Michael Haygarth shared 1st–3rd place with Jonathan Penrose and Harry Golombek in British Chess Championship but left in 2nd place in an additional tournament where Penrose won. In 1964, in Whitby he won British Chess Championship. In 1974, Michael Haygarth shared 1st–7th place in British Chess Championship but left in 4th place in an additional tournament. In 1976, he shared 3rd-4th place in British Chess Championship.

Michael Haygarth played for England in the Chess Olympiads:

- In 1960, at fourth board in the 14th Chess Olympiad in Leipzig (+5, =7, -3),
- In 1964, at third board in the 16th Chess Olympiad in Tel Aviv (+1, =7, -2).

Michael Haygarth played for England in the European Team Chess Championship preliminaries:

- In 1977, at eighth board in the 6th European Team Chess Championship preliminaries (+0, =2, -0),

Michael Haygarth played for England in the Clare Benedict Chess Cups:

- In 1960, at third board in the 7th Clare Benedict Chess Cup in Biel (+4, =1, -0) and won team silver and individual gold medals,
- In 1961, at third board in the 8th Clare Benedict Chess Cup in Neuhausen (+0, =3, -2) and won team bronze medal,
- In 1962, at third board in the 9th Clare Benedict Chess Cup in Bern (+1, =4, -0) and won team bronze medal.
