= Michael Hennigan (chess player) =

English chess player (born 1970)

Personal information
- Born: October 8, 1970 (age 55) Hammersmith, England
- Spouse: Rita Atkins

Chess career
- Country: England
- Title: International Master (1991)
- Peak rating: 2465 (July 1994)

Michael Thomas Hennigan is an English chess player.

== Chess career ==
In 1988, he won the U18 section of the World Youth Chess Championship.

In August 1993, he won the British Chess Championship alongside Dharshan Kumaran. In the championship, he won the Raymond Mays Best Game Prize for his game against Chris Ward.

In January 1994, he tied for third place with Ketevan Arakhamia-Grant and Matthew Sadler at the Hastings International Chess Congress.

== Personal life ==
He studied engineering at the University of Bristol. He married Hungarian chess player Rita Atkins.
