= A. R. B. Thomas =

English amateur chess player

Personal information
- Full name: Andrew Rowland Benedick Thomas
- Born: 11 October 1904 Great Crosby, Liverpool, England
- Died: 16 May 1985 (aged 80) Mid-Devon, England

Chess career
- Country: United Kingdom

Andrew Rowland Benedick Thomas (11 October 1904 – 16 May 1985), was an amateur chess player from Devon, England. He taught mathematics at Blundell's School in Tiverton from 1927 until retiring in 1969, and continued to live in the town until his death.
