= Harriet Hunt =

English chess player (born 1978)

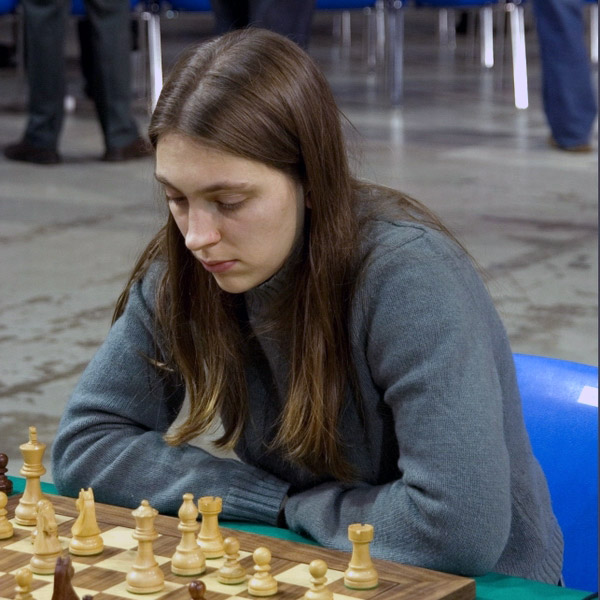
- Harriet Hunt, Warsaw 2006

Personal information
- Born: Harriet Vaughan Hunt; 4 February 1978 (age 48) Oxford, England

Chess career
- Country: England
- Title: International Master (1999); Woman Grandmaster (1997)
- Peak rating: 2463 (January 2009)

Harriet Vaughan Hunt (born 4 February 1978 in Oxford) is an English chess player and five-time British Women's Chess Champion (which she most recently won in October 2021, 22 years after her fourth win). Having trained as a plant scientist at Cambridge University, she is currently a researcher working at Kew Gardens.

== Playing history ==
A high-profile player from an early age, Hunt won five British Junior Girls titles between 1989 and 1991. Even more significant was her (1991) share of the British Junior Under-14 title, when she became the first girl to compete victoriously in the Boys/Open section of the national championships.

At 16, she made her debut for the English Ladies Olympiad Team. Her result at the event included a draw with future Ladies World Champion Antoaneta Stefanova.

Her performances at the World Youth Chess Championships included a bronze at Under-14 level (Duisburg, 1992) and silver from the Cala Galdana Under-18 event of 1996.

Between 1995 and 1999 she was British Ladies Champion four times. She won this title again in 2021.

Then in 1997, she won the World Girls' (Under-20) Championship in Żagań, at the end of a "year out" between school and her Plant Science studies at Cambridge University. In Pula the same year and by then a Woman International Master, she scored 5/7 on board 2 at the European Team Chess Championship and this contributed to the English Ladies Team's third-place finish and a team bronze medal. 1997 was also the year that Hunt was invited by chess organiser Johan Zwanepol to compete at the Groningen Open Grandmaster tournament. Zwanepol had been an arbiter at her Zagan victory and was keen to see further progress. Her result of 6/11 was probably as good as could be expected in such a strong competition (the entry included over 30 grandmasters headed by Mikhail Gurevich, Jaan Ehlvest, Tony Miles, Liviu-Dieter Nisipeanu, Suat Atalık, Sergei Tiviakov etc.).

By 1999, Hunt had attained the title of Woman Grandmaster and at the Batumi European Team Championship played board 1, returning a 7/9 performance to win the individual gold medal.

She was awarded the International Master title in 2000, the same year that she graduated with a B.A. from St. John's College. Pursuing an academic career, she commenced a PhD and research fellowship at Cambridge, specialising in archaeogenetics, a subject allied to her degree. In July of that year, her chess reached a new career high when an Elo rating of 2454 placed her at 16th in the World's top 100 women. In 2001, she led the English ladies once more to the European Team Championship (in León, Spain) and again returned with a team bronze medal.

At the 2004 Chess Olympiad in Calvià, she narrowly missed out on a medal after scoring 9.5/13, for a rating performance of 2558, including a notable victory over Humpy Koneru.

Good results were also forthcoming in individual competition, including international tournaments at London (Agency), Cappelle-la-Grande, Berlin (Summer Festival), Stockholm (Rilton Cup) and Hastings. She regularly matched the performances of male Grandmasters at these events and occasionally defeated them.

Hunt has been a Cambridge team member at the annual Varsity (Oxford vs Cambridge) match – historically the world's longest running series of matches. At the millennium event, she contested an all-girl pair-up with former World Girls (Under-18) Champion, Ruth Sheldon. The game was originally slotted as a board 2 encounter, but its elevation to top board brought the match increased publicity and a unique place in the history of the event. Their individual game finished a hard-fought draw, but Cambridge went on to win the match by the narrowest of margins.

In regular University team competition she has represented Jesus College Chess Society in the highest student league. The team shared first place in the 2005/06 season, losing only to Emmanuel College, and Hunt scored 100% on top board. At a national level, she plays in the 4NCL, representing Betsson.com in the 2006/7 and 2007/08 seasons and more recently, Pride and Prejudice. In Germany, she has played in the (Ladies) Bundesliga.

Having completed her doctorate, Harriet Hunt was employed by Cambridge University as a research associate at the McDonald Institute of Archaeological Research, and is now working at Kew Gardens. Less active as a chess player, she manages to maintain a high rating, preserving her status as England's top woman player and holding a regular place in the world's top 50 women.

In 2008, she participated at the Stockholm Ladies Open, held in Täby, a northern municipality. The event was described by Hunt as one of the largest and best funded women's tournaments of all time and she performed well, finishing on 6½/9, a half-point behind overall winner Anna Muzychuk, whom she defeated in their personal encounter in round 6.

== Family ==
Hunt had two younger brothers; Adam, also an International Master, a professional school chess coach and examinations officer who died in 2024, and Laurence, a cognitive neuroscientist.

== Sample games ==
- Koneru-Hunt, 0-1, Calvia Olympiad, 2004. Black skilfully outmanoeuvres her highly rated opponent on the queenside, obtaining a lasting advantage and a winning ending.
- Cramling-Hunt, 0-1, Women's Chess Cup, Dresden, 2006. Black's understanding of the positional requirements, combined with queenside pressure creates insurmountable problems for a player rated 100 Elo points higher.
- Hunt-Muzychuk, 1-0, Stockholm Ladies Tournament, 2008. White's provocative central and kingside play exposes the Black king, with lethal consequences.
