= Gillian Moore (chess player) =

English chess player (born 1944)

Personal information
- Born: 1944 (age 81–82) Southampton, England

Chess career
- Country: England
- Peak rating: 1976 (October 2008)

Gillian A. Moore is an English chess player.

== Chess career ==
She began playing chess at the age of 9 after being taught by her father, later taking the game seriously at the age of 13 in the Weston Park Girls School.

In 1966, she won the British Women's Chess Championship.

She played for the Hampshire Chess Association and wrote three books detailing her games and chess career.

She served as the chairman of the Southampton Chess League from 2010 to 2020.
