= Edith Michell =

English chess player

Edith Mary Ann Michell (née Tapsell) (26 July 1872 in Croydon, Surrey – 18 October 1951 in Bexhill-on-Sea, Sussex) was an English female chess master.

At the beginning of her career, she twice won Redhill Chess Club championships in 1906 and 1909. More than two decades later, she became the three times winner of the British Women's Chess Championship in 1931 (jointly), 1932, and 1935.

She took 4th at Meran 1924 (unofficial European women's championship, Helene Cotton and Edith Holloway won). She tied for 4-5th at London 1927 (the 1st Women's World Chess Championship) and took 4th at Folkestone 1933 (the 4th Women's World Chess Championship), both won by Vera Menchik.

She was the wife of Reginald Pryce Michell.
