= Vicente Almirall Castell =

Spanish chess player

Vicente Almirall Castell (27 February 1904 in Barcelona - ?) was a Spanish chess player, coach and referee who reached the rank of National Master. He developed his chess career in Madrid, and won the old Castile chess championship on the first occasion that it took place in 1935, and in the second contest of 1936 he tied with Juan Manuel Fuentes in the first position. He won the Torneo Nacional de Madrid (National Tournament in Madrid) in 1935, which gave him the right to challenge the champion Ramón Rey Ardid, which he lost, making him a runner-up. In 1950 he became president of the Catalan Chess Federation, and from 1951 he was a national chess coach and international chess referee.
