= Jonathan Penrose =

English chess grandmaster (1933–2021)

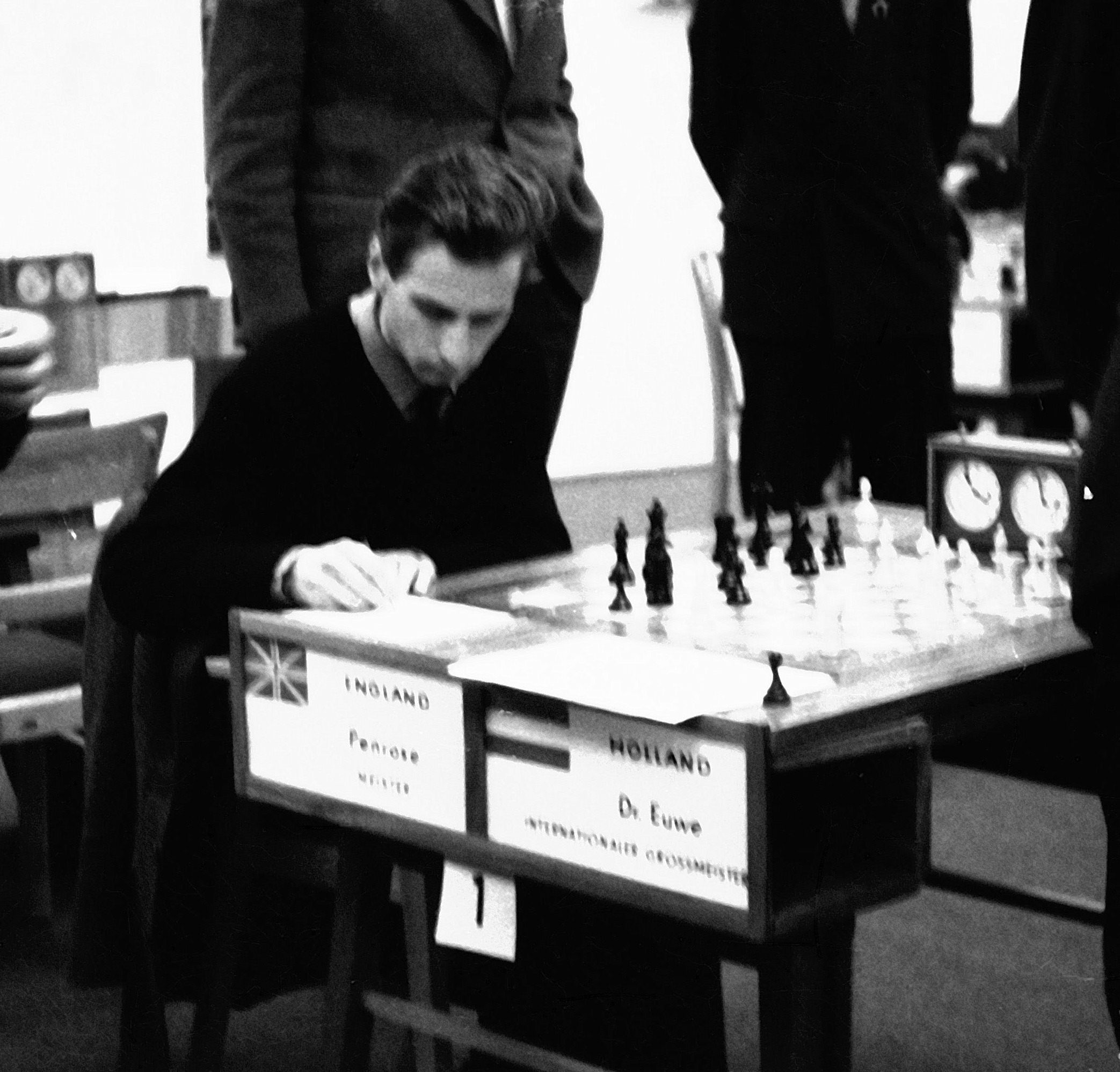
- Penrose at the 1960 Chess Olympiad

Personal information
- Born: 7 October 1933 Colchester, England
- Died: 30 November 2021 (aged 88)

Chess career
- Country: England
- Title: FIDE Grandmaster (1993); ICCF Grandmaster (1983)
- Peak rating: 2450 (July 1971)
- ICCF peak rating: 2724 (July 1993)

Jonathan Penrose, OBE (7 October 1933 – 30 November 2021) was an English chess player, who held the titles Grandmaster (1993) and International Correspondence Chess Grandmaster (1983). He won the British Chess Championship ten times between 1958 and 1969.

== Early years ==
Penrose was born in Colchester. Learning the game at age four, he was a member of Hampstead Chess Club at twelve and British Boys (Under 18) Champion at just fourteen years of age. Chess was played by the entire Penrose family. His father was a composer of endgame studies and a strong player, as was his older brother Oliver.

By the age of seventeen, he was already acknowledged as a top prospect for British chess. Playing Hastings for the first time in 1950/51, he beat the French champion Nicolas Rossolimo and at Southsea in 1950, defeated both Efim Bogoljubov and Savielly Tartakower. In 1952/1953 he shared the first place at Hastings with Harry Golombek, Antonio Medina García and Daniel Yanofsky.

== Playing career ==
Penrose earned the International Master title in 1961 and was the leading British player for several years in the 1960s and early 1970s, surpassing the achievement of Henry Ernest Atkins by winning the British Championship a record number of times. He was widely considered to be of grandmaster strength, but did not achieve the grandmaster title during his active playing career, despite some notable victories. This was mainly due to his choosing to remain amateur and placing his lecturing as a first priority. As a consequence, he played few international tournaments and frequently turned down invitations to prestigious tournaments such as Hastings. Nevertheless, FIDE made him a grandmaster in 1993.

He competed in eight Chess Olympiads between 1952 and 1962, then at the Olympiads of 1968 and 1970, frequently posting excellent scores, including +9−1=7 in 1962 (Varna), and +10−0=5 in 1968 (Lugano). On both of these occasions, he won an individual silver medal on first board; in 1968, his score was bettered only by the World Champion, Tigran Petrosian.

Penrose vs. Tal, Leipzig 1960

Position: c8 white rook, d8 black rook, h8 black king, d7 white pawn, b6 white knight, g6 black pawn, h6 black pawn, c5 white bishop, e5 black pawn, a4 black pawn, e4 white knight, h4 black bishop, b3 black bishop, g3 white pawn, h3 white pawn, g1 white king

Final position

At the Leipzig 1960 Olympiad, he defeated then-World Champion Mikhail Tal with the white pieces in a Modern Benoni:

1.d4 Nf6 2.c4 e6 3.Nc3 c5 4.d5 exd5 5.cxd5 d6 6.e4 g6 7.Bd3 Bg7 8.Nge2 O-O 9.O-O a6 10.a4 Qc7 11.h3 Nbd7 12.f4 Re8 13.Ng3 c4 14.Bc2 Nc5 15.Qf3 Nfd7 16.Be3 b5 17.axb5 Rb8 18.Qf2 axb5 19.e5 dxe5 20.f5 Bb7 21.Rad1 Ba8 22.Nce4 Na4 23.Bxa4 bxa4 24.fxg6 fxg6 25.Qf7+ Kh8 26.Nc5 Qa7 27.Qxd7 Qxd7 28.Nxd7 Rxb2 29.Nb6 Rb3 30.Nxc4 Rd8 31.d6 Rc3 32.Rc1 Rxc1 33.Rxc1 Bd5 34.Nb6 Bb3 35.Ne4 h6 36.d7 Bf8 37.Rc8 Be7 38.Bc5 Bh4 39.g3 1–0.

This victory made Penrose the first British player to beat a reigning world champion since Joseph Henry Blackburne defeated Emanuel Lasker in 1899.

== Correspondence chess ==
Penrose's over the board performance started to decline in the 1970s and he fainted at the 1970 Olympiad during a tense game. Consequently, he moved on to correspondence chess, where he was successful, earning the International Master (IMC) title in 1980 and the grandmaster (GMC) title in 1983. He led his country to victory in the 9th Correspondence Olympiad (1982–1987).

== Personal life ==
Jonathan Penrose was the son of Margaret Leathes and Lionel Penrose, professor of genetics. He was the grandson of physiologist John Beresford Leathes, and brother to mathematician, mathematical physicist, and philosopher of science Roger Penrose, theoretical physicist Oliver Penrose, and geneticist Shirley Hodgson. Jonathan was a doctor of psychology, lecturing at the Enfield College of Technology.

In 1962, Penrose married chess player Margaret Wood, who competed in the British ladies’ championship and was the daughter of Frank Wood, former chief secretary of the Oxfordshire Chess Association. They had two daughters, Katy and Harriet. They separated in 1978.

Penrose was awarded the OBE in 1971, for "services to chess."

He died on 30 November 2021, at the age of 88.

== Bibliography ==
- Golombek, Harry, ed. (1981). The Penguin Encyclopedia of Chess. Penguin Books. ISBN 978-0-14-046452-8.
- Sunnucks, Anne (1970). The Encyclopaedia of Chess. Hale. ISBN 0-7091-1030-8.
- Gizycki, Jerzy (1977). A History Of Chess (revised ed.). Abbey Library. p. 60. ISBN 0-7196-0086-3.
