= Eileen Betsy Tranmer =

English chess player and clarinettist (1910–1983)

Personal information
- Born: 5 May 1910 Scarborough, England
- Died: 26 September 1983 (aged 73) Ticehurst, England

Chess career
- Country: England
- Title: Woman International Master (1950)

Eileen Betsy Tranmer (5 May 1910 – 26 September 1983) was an English musician and chess player who held the title of Woman International Master (WIM, 1950). She was a four-time winner of the British Women's Chess Championship (1947, 1949, 1953, 1961).

== Biography ==
From the end of the 1940s to the start of the 1960s, she was one of England's leading women chess players. Eileen Betsy Tranmer four times won the British Women's Chess Championships: 1947, 1949, 1953 and 1961. In 1950, Eileen Betsy Tranmer participated at Women's World Chess Championship in Moscow where shared 5th-7th place. In 1952, she participated at Women's World Chess Championship Candidates Tournament in Moscow and ranked 7th place. In 1950, she was awarded the FIDE Woman International Master (WIM) title.

On 20 June 1946 Tranmer played (and lost) a "radio chess" match against the Russian woman chess player Valentina Byelova. Tranmer was one of two women who were part of a twelve-member British team who played in a four-day radio chess tournament. The British team played their moves in London while the Soviet team played their moves in Moscow.

Eileen Betsy Tranmer played for England in the Women's Chess Olympiad:

- In 1957, at second board in the 1st Chess Olympiad (women) in Emmen (+3, =8, -3).

In addition to participating in chess tournaments, Eileen Betsy Tranmer also was prominent clarinettist. In March 1940, she gave concerts with Scottish Orchestra. From 1950 she working with Sadler's Wells Orchestra along with another British clarinetist, Thea King.
