= William Ewart Napier =

American chess master (1881–1952)

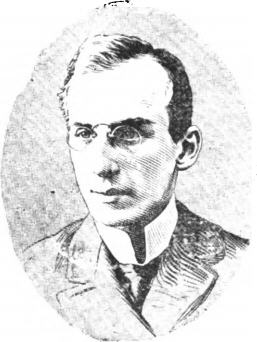
- Photo of William Ewart Napier from 1901
- Born: January 17, 1881; Surrey, England
- Died: September 6, 1952 (aged 71); Washington, D.C., United States
- Occupation(s): chess master, later insurance company executive
- Spouse: Florence Gillespie
- Children: Ruth and one other daughter
- Parent(s): John and Isabella Collier Napier

William Ewart Napier (17 January 1881, in East Dulwich, Surrey – 6 September 1952, in Washington, D.C.) was an American chess master of English birth.

== Life ==
William Napier's parents emigrated to the United States when he was five years old. From 1895, he lived in Brooklyn and came into contact with some of the best chess players of the country. He had his first successes with simultaneous games, among other things winning in December 1894 versus the acting United States Chess Champion Jackson Whipps Showalter. At the beginning of 1896, despite his young age, Napier became a member of the Brooklyn Chess Club and won the club championship later that year, at the age of 15. In the same year he defeated the later grandmaster Frank James Marshall in a match, winning 7:1 with 3 draws. 1897 saw him win a tournament game against ex-world champion Wilhelm Steinitz.

At the beginning of 1899, Napier traveled to Europe, in order to study music there, and visited the chess clubs of London, Paris and Berlin. In 1900 he returned to the US and established himself in Pittsburgh. There he wrote the chess column of the newspaper Pittsburgh Dispatch. In 1901, he won a master tournament in Buffalo versus Eugene Delmar, placing behind tournament winner Harry Nelson Pillsbury, but still above Marshall. This success encouraged him to participate in the following years in some international master tournaments. He played in Monte Carlo and Hanover in 1902 as well as in Cambridge Springs in 1904. He won none of those tournaments, but in each case received a special prize for brilliantly played games, for example winning the Rothschild Brilliancy Prize for his game against Mikhail Chigorin. In July 1904, he visited Great Britain and won a well-attended tournament in London against Richard Teichmann, Joseph Henry Blackburne and Isidor Gunsberg. Subsequently, he participated in the British championship in Hastings, where he was, because of his English birth, entitled to take part, and won the tournament against Henry Atkins, whom he defeated in the pass fight with 2.5-1.5, to become the first British Chess Federation Champion. Thereafter, Atkins became the most dominant player in the history of the British Championship, winning the next nine championships in which he competed. In 1905 Napier played two matches: against Jacques Mieses the match was undecided (4-4 with 2 draws), against Teichmann he lost 1-5 with 4 draws.

Afterwards Napier withdrew from the international tournament arena. He gained American citizenship in 1908 and began a career at an insurance company, becoming vice president of the Scranton Insurance Company. He married Florence Gillespie (Pillsbury's niece), with whom he later had two daughters. Although he still participated in chess, he played no more important tournaments. When he died at the age of 71, his chess career was nearly forgotten.

His best historical Elo number was 2662. He was, at the time, 11th place in the world.

== Lasker ==
Napier called a game he lost to reigning World Champion Emanuel Lasker at Cambridge Springs 1904 the best of his career. The game showed great tactical skill by both players. Napier was particularly impressed by how Lasker kept his composure in severe time pressure. Lasker said afterwards to his young opponent: "It is your brilliancy, even though I won it."

Lasker - Napier 1.e4 c5 2.Nc3 Nc6 3.Nf3 g6 4.d4 cxd4 5.Nxd4 Bg7 6.Be3 d6 7.h3 Nf6 8.g4 O-O 9.g5 Ne8 10.h4 Nc7 11.f4 e5 12.Nde2 d5 13.exd5 Nd4 14.Nxd4 Nxd5 15.Nf5 Nxc3 16.Qxd8 Rxd8 17.Ne7+ Kh8 18.h5 Re8 19.Bc5 gxh5 20.Bc4 exf4 21.Bxf7 Ne4 22.Bxe8 Bxb2 23.Rb1 Bc3+ 24.Kf1 Bg4 25.Bxh5 Bxh5 26.Rxh5 Ng3+ 27.Kg2 Nxh5 28.Rxb7 a5 29.Rb3 Bg7 30.Rh3 Ng3 31.Kf3 Ra6 32.Kxf4 Ne2+ 33.Kf5 Nc3 34.a3 Na4 35.Be3 1-0

== Quotes ==
- "Mason had the unique quality of competently simmering through six aching hours, and scintillating in the seventh. Others resembled him, but forgot to scintillate."
- "The Pawn move is a capital investment. Every one of the forty-eight should, from the beginning, be spent as if it were one of the last forty-eight apprehensive and responsible dollars between yourself and starvation."

== Bibliography ==
- Amenities and background of chess-play. Napier, William Ewart, 1935.
- Paul Morphy and the golden age of chess. Napier, William Ewart, 1957. (published posthumously)
