= Fred Yates (chess player) =

English chess player (1884–1932)

Personal information
- Born: Fred Dewhirst Yates; 16 January 1884 Birstall, England
- Died: 11 November 1932 (aged 48) London, England

Chess career
- Country: England

Fred Dewhirst Yates (16 January 1884 – 11 November 1932) was an English chess master who won the British Chess Championship on six occasions. He started a career in accountancy, but in 1909, abandoned it in favour of becoming a professional chess player and journalist.

== Chess career ==
Yates almost won the British Championship in 1911, when he tied for first place with Henry Atkins, but lost the play-off. He went on to secure the title in 1913, 1914, 1921, 1926, 1928 and 1931.

Despite considerable domestic success, his record in international tournaments did not do him justice. Often the winner against his strongest opponents, he would then lose to those at the bottom of the table. This was particularly apparent at the Budapest tournament of 1926.

Yates

His lack of consistency was attributed to poor health and loss of stamina. A constant hacking cough went unchecked, as his funds did not stretch to a holiday in warmer climes; the advice given by his doctor. He was also subjected to journalistic pressures, frequently reporting on the tournaments in which he was playing. Yet, dedicating himself to the playing side of chess would have earned him insufficient sums to make a living. A number of his contemporaries believed that his talent could have placed him among the world championship contenders, had his circumstances been different. Nevertheless, in his time, he defeated most of his illustrious adversaries, the most notable exceptions being Emanuel Lasker and José Raúl Capablanca. His victory against Alexander Alekhine at Karlsbad in 1923 won the brilliancy prize, and he took third at NCCU Premier Tournament at Liverpool where Jacques Mieses won, while his win against Milan Vidmar at San Remo in 1930 was described by Alekhine as the finest game played since the war.

As a journalist he was the chess columnist of the Manchester Guardian and with William Winter, the co-author of Modern Master Play (1929). He wrote accounts of two world championship encounters: between Alekhine and Capablanca, and between Alekhine and Efim Bogoljubow.

In team competition, he played at the first, third and fourth Olympiads, representing the 'British Empire' team. On each occasion, he made a plus score and at London 1927, earned a team bronze medal.

His life ended prematurely, when a leaking gas pipe caused him to asphyxiate during his sleep.

According to the inscription on Yates' gravestone, his birth name was actually Fred Dewhirst Yates. However, throughout his chess career he was known as Frederick Dewhurst Yates, or simply as F.D. Yates, both of which featured in his posthumously published, part-biographical, 'My Best Games' Collection. 'Frederick Dewhurst Yates' was also used by the editor of British Chess Magazine in the title of Yates' obituary.

== Tournament record ==
Competing within the British Isles, he was first at Glasgow 1911, Cheltenham 1913, Chester 1914, Malvern 1921, Edinburgh 1926 and Tunbridge Wells 1927. There were second-place finishes at Oxford 1910, Richmond 1912, Southport 1924, Hastings 1924/25 and Stratford-upon-Avon 1925.

Abroad, his best results included first equal with Savielly Tartakower at Kecskemét (B Final, 1927) and fifth at San Remo (the strongest tournament of 1930), when he finished ahead of Spielmann, Vidmar and Tartakower. He was second at Ghent in 1926, after Tartakower, but ahead of Colle and Janowski.

== Notable games ==
- Yates was a very sporting person and even published this loss to Capablanca in his own collection of best games:
  Capablanca vs. Yates, English Opening, Barcelona 1929
  1.Nf3 Nf6 2.c4 g6 3.b3 Bg7 4.Bb2 0-0 5.g3 d6 6.Bg2 Nc6 7.0-0 e5 8.d4 Nd7 9.dxe5 Ndxe5 10.Nc3 Re8 11.Nxe5 Nxe5 12.Qd2 a5 13.Rac1 Rb8 14.h3 Bd7 15.Nd5 b6 16.f4 Nc6 17.Bxg7 Kxg7 18.Qb2+ f6 19.g4 Nb4 20.g5 Nxd5 21.cxd5 Rc8 22.e4 c6 23.dxc6 Rxc6 24.gxf6+ Kf7 25.e5 Rxc1 26.Rxc1 dxe5 27.fxe5 Qb8 28.Qd4 Bf5 29.Bd5+ Kf8 30.Qf4 Rxe5 31.Qh6+ Ke8 32.f7+ 1–0
- He was also noted for extreme doggedness, fighting until the last vestige of hope was gone before conceding defeat. His game against Alekhine involved a combination some eighteen moves deep:
  Alekhine vs. Yates, King's Indian Defence, Karlsbad 1923
  1.d4 Nf6 2.c4 g6 3.g3 Bg7 4.Bg2 0-0 5.Nc3 d6 6.Nf3 Nc6 7.d5 Nb8 8.e4 Nbd7 9.0-0 a5 10.Be3 Ng4 11.Bd4 Nge5 12.Nxe5 Nxe5 13.c5 dxc5 14.Bxc5 b6 15.Bd4 Ba6 16.Re1 Qd6 17.Bf1 Bxf1 18.Rxf1 c5 19.Bxe5 Qxe5 20.Qb3 Rab8 21.Qb5 f5 22.Rae1 f4 23.Qd7 Rbd8 24.gxf4 Qxf4 25.Qe6+ Kh8 26.f3 Qg5+ 27.Kh1 Rd6 28.Qh3 Be5 29.Re2 Rdf6 30.Nd1 Rf4 31.Ne3 Rh4 32.Qe6 Qh5 33.Ng4 Rxg4 34.fxg4 Rxf1+ 35.Kg2 Qxh2+ 36.Kxf1 Qh1+ 37.Kf2 Bd4+ 38.Kg3 Qg1+ 39.Kh3 Qf1+ 40.Rg2 Qh1+ 41.Kg3 Qe1+ 42.Kh3 g5 43.Rc2 Qf1+ 44.Kh2 Qg1+ 45.Kh3 Qh1+ 46.Kg3 Qd1 47.Rc3 Qg1+ 48.Kh3 Qf1+ 49.Kg3 Bf2+ 50.Kf3 Bg1+ 0–1
- Vidmar vs. Yates, Queen's Gambit Declined, San Remo 1930, 0–1. Black parries White's resourceful kingside attack and develops sharp counterplay on the opposite wing.
