= MonRoi =

MonRoi, Inc. is a Montreal-based company that created a system to allow the recording of chess games in an electronic format. The system also allows for games to be broadcast via MonRoi's World Databank of Chess in realtime, as the games are being played.

MonRoi is one of five electronic scorekeeping devices that are approved for use during USCF rated games. The other four are the DGT Electronic Chessboard the eNotate computer program running on a Windows Mobile PDA, Plycounter, and ChessNoteR which uses the Android operating system and repurposes a Motorola Nexus 6 device to deliver its software.
