= Elmira Mirzayeva =

Russian chess player (born 1981)

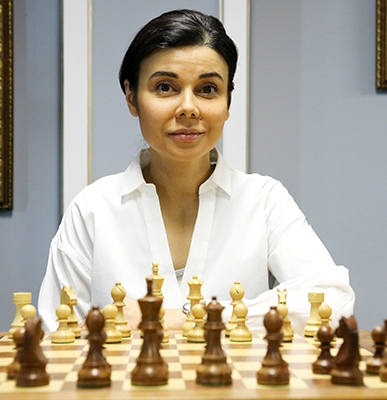

Personal information
- Born: Elmira Nazim qızı Mirzayeva; 2 November 1981 (age 44) Moscow, SSR

Chess career
- Country: Russia (until 2024); England (since 2024)
- Title: Woman Grandmaster (2002)
- Peak rating: 2379 (December 2015)

Elmira Mirzayeva (Azerbaijani: Elmira Mirzəyeva) (2 November 1981) is a Russian chess player. She is a Women's International Grandmaster (2002). Sports journalist, chess commentator of the All-Russian State Television and Radio Broadcasting Company.

== Biography ==
Elmira Mirzayeva was born on November 2, 1981, in Moscow in an Azerbaijani family. Her parents come from the city of Ganja. Elmira has an older sister named Gulnara and a younger brother named Nizami. It was named after his brother poet Nizami Ganjavi.

=== Chess activity ===
In 1995, she became the Moscow champion among schoolgirls. In 1996, she won the title of Russian champion among girls up to 16 years old in the final of the Russian Championship held in Kaluga. In the October–November season of 1996, she played for the Russian team at the junior world championship. In 1998, she became the Moscow blitz champion among women, and a year later she became the owner of the Russian Blitz Cup among women.

In 2008, she won the unofficial world trade chess championship.

2011, 2012, 2013, 2014 "Moscow Open" international chess festival prize winner.
