= Rowena Mary Bruce =

English chess player

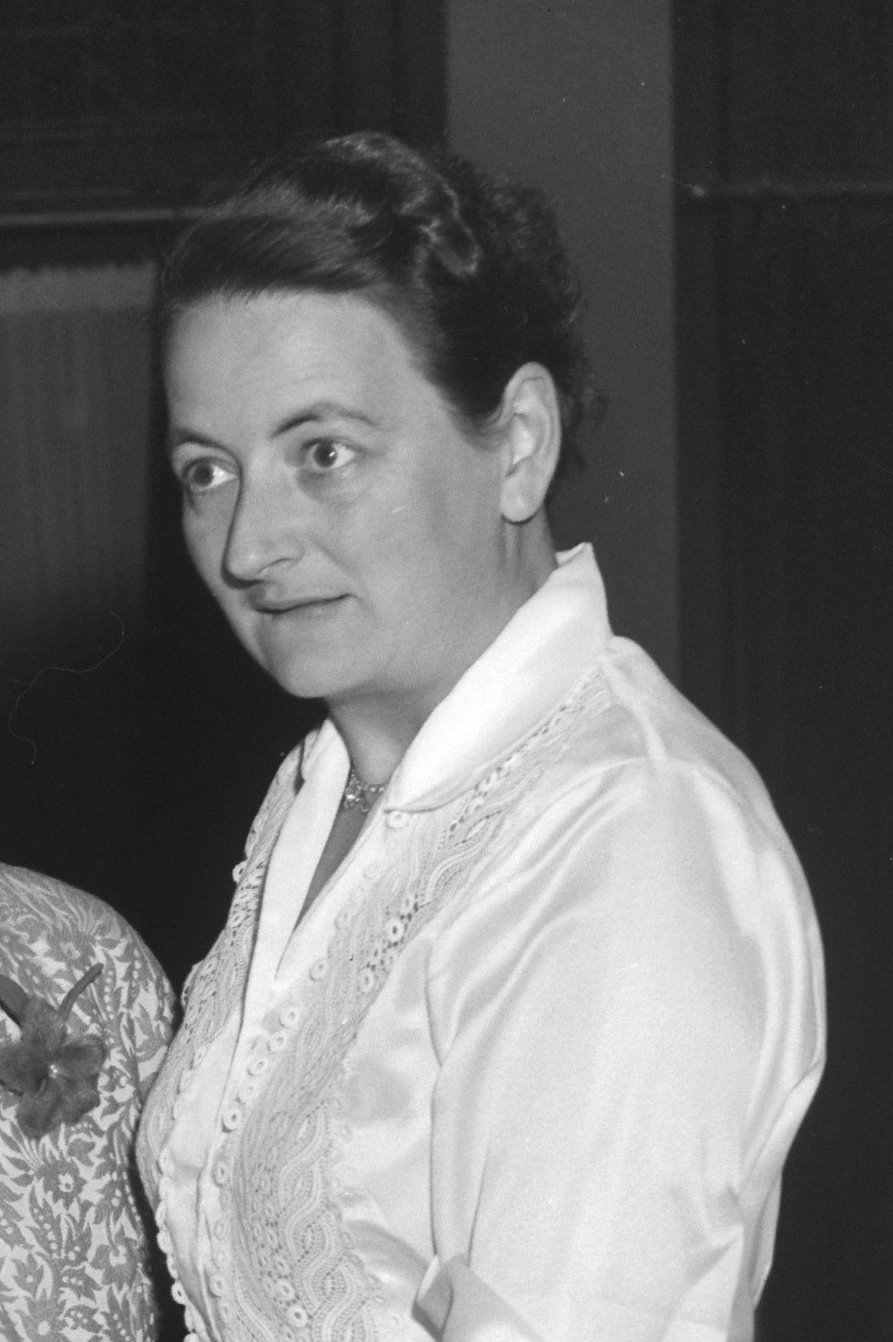
- Bruce (1959)

Personal information
- Born: 15 May 1919 Plymouth, England
- Died: 24 September 1999 (aged 80) Plymouth, England

Chess career
- Country: England
- Title: Woman International Master (1951)

Rowena Mary Bruce (15 May 1919 – 24 September 1999), née Dew, was an English chess player who held the title of Woman International Master (WIM, 1951). She was an eleven-time winner of the British Women's Chess Championship (1937, 1950, 1951, 1954, 1955, 1959, 1960, 1962, 1963, 1967 and 1969). She has won the tournament the most.

== Biography ==
From the end of the 1930s to the end of the 1960s, she was one of England's strongest and most well-known female chess players. In 1935, she won the FIDE World Girls Championship. Rowena Mary Bruce won the British Women's Chess Championship eleven times: 1937, 1950, 1951, 1954, 1955, 1959, 1960, 1962, 1963, 1967 and 1969 (both last times shared 1st place with Dinah Margaret Norman). In 1952, in Moscow, she participated in the Women's Candidates Tournament where she took 12th place. In 1951, she was awarded the FIDE Woman International Master (WIM) title.

On 21 June 1946, Bruce played (and lost) a "radio chess" match against Lyudmila Rudenko. Bruce was one of two women who were part of a twelve-member British team who played in a four-day tournament. The British team played their moves in London while the Russian team played their moves in Moscow.

Rowena Mary Bruce played for England in the Women's Chess Olympiads:

- In 1966, at second board in the 3rd Chess Olympiad (women) in Oberhausen (+5, =5, -2) where she won an individual silver medal, and
- In 1969, at second board in the 4th Chess Olympiad (women) in Lublin (+5, =3, -6).

In 1940, she married Ronald Bruce, and the two were married until his death in 1991.

== Death ==
Following a series of small strokes, she died at the age of 80 in 1999.
