= William Winter (chess player) =

British chess player (1897–1955)

Personal information
- Born: William Winter; 11 September 1897 Medstead, England
- Died: 18 December 1955 (aged 57) London, England

Chess career
- Country: England

William Winter (11 September 1897 – 18 December 1955) was a British chess player. He won the British Open Chess Championship in 1934 and the British Chess Championship in 1935 and 1936. An acolyte of Siegbert Tarrasch, his sound, strategic play enabled him to defeat a number of the world's top players, including David Bronstein, Aron Nimzowitsch and Milan Vidmar. However, his health and tactical play were insufficiently strong to enable him to repeat these victories on a consistent basis.

== Life and career ==
Winter was a widely respected author of chess books and was a nephew of J. M. Barrie, the creator of Peter Pan. Winter was also a Communist. His over-the-board and real-life characters were in stark contrast to each other. Harry Golombek described his play as "classic, scientific and sober; away from the board, he was revolutionary, illogically moved by his emotions (he contrived to be both a fervent communist and a staunch patriot) and, more often than not, drunk."

Winter has the distinction of being the only British Champion to have served time in prison (for his political activities). His memoirs were serialised in CHESS magazine in the late 1950s.

Due to the outbreak of World War I, he had to break and then resume his law studies. During his time there, he was the champion of Cambridge University.

Winter played in four Olympiads, in 1930, 1931, 1933, and 1935.

== Books by Winter ==
- Chess for Match Players, originally published in 1936 by Lawrence & Wishart; re-published in 1951 by Carroll and Nicholson and in 1965 by Dover Publications.
- The Anglo-Soviet Radio Chess Match, 1947 with E. Klein, Sir Isaac Pitman & Sons, Ltd.
- Kings of Chess ISBN 4871878287
- The World Chess Championship : 1951; Botvinnik v. Bronstein. with Robert Wade, ISBN 4871878295
