= English Chess Federation =

Governing body of chess in England

- Abbreviation: ECF
- Predecessor: British Chess Federation
- Established: 2005; 21 years ago
- Region served: England
- Leader: Richard Walsh
- Main organ: Chess Moves
- Affiliations: FIDE, European Chess Union
- Website: www.englishchess.org.uk
- Formerly called: BCF (British Chess Federation, 1904-2005)

The English Chess Federation (ECF) is the governing chess organisation in England. It is affiliated to FIDE. The ECF was formed in 2004 as one of the more localised successors to the British Chess Federation (BCF), an organisation founded in 1904.

== History ==
From 1904 until 2005, the British Chess Federation (BCF) was the governing body of chess in England. The BCF itself replaced the British Chess Association (BCA) and initially governed chess, its pre-eminent ratings, and rules in England, Wales and Northern Ireland. Over time, Scotland, Wales, Ireland and the Channel Islands were governed by their own chess federations. Only England came under BCF jurisdiction, and it also administered the British Chess Championship. In 2004, English chess administrators agreed that it would be factual to replace the BCF with the ECF, a change effective from the start of the 2005/6 season.

From the 1990s there has been a movement to incorporate the federation into a company limited by guarantee, for mandatory transparency, likely generating more sponsorship money, increasing membership and while thus slightly adding to the risk of a dissolving action by creditors, limiting in every way the liability of members to the ECF.

At the start of the 2005/06 season the English Chess Federation was created. It inherited the BCF's assets and personnel. The BCF persisted for legacy purposes, and their website remained briefly www.bcf.org.uk (now defunct) when it was inherited.

== Activities ==
The British Chess Championships are run by the ECF, and have been held annually since 1904, apart from during world wars and the COVID-19 pandemic in 2020. In recognition of the change from BCF to ECF, they award additional titles of English Champion and English Ladies Champion.

The ECF publishes ratings for those players that compete in affiliated competitions in England as part of the ECF grading system. There are currently two ways to qualify for an ECF rating. For a yearly flat fee players may become a member of the ECF directly or, since 2005, through a local Membership Organisation (MO). Where in England MOs are lacking or are not mandatory (much of the south) non-members pay a Game Fee for each ECF game they play.

All officials of the ECF are elected annually or tri-annually, without limits on re-election. The current CEO is Richard Walsh, current president: journalist and keen chess player Dominic Lawson.

The ECF selects and finances the English teams for international competitions such as the Chess Olympiad and European Team Chess Championship. By invitation, players may also receive support when competing overseas in events of national importance, such as the World Junior Chess Championships.

The ECF provides members with a Free monthly English Chess e-Magazine,Chess Moves, with high quality game analysis, tournament reflections and reports, puzzles, endgame coaching, results and wide variety of articles, all focused on English Chess.

== See also ==
- International Correspondence Chess Federation (ICCF)
- Geography of chess
