= 1940 in chess =

The below is a list of events in chess in the year 1940.

== Chess events in brief ==
- 17 January 1940 – Dawid Przepiórka, Stanisław Kohn, Moishe Lowtzky, Achilles Frydman, Abkin, Młynek, Zahorski and many others were arrested at the Kwieciński Chess Café in Warsaw, and imprisoned at Daniłowiczowska Str. (they had played a prison tournament won by Lowtzky there). Later (February – March 1940) most of them (all Jewish) were killed in a mass execution by the Nazis in Palmiry, General Government.
- 23 September 1940 – The National Chess Centre in London was destroyed by fire during The Blitz.
- The famous French chess magazine La Stratégie ceases publication after 73 years. It had been established in Paris in 1867.

== Tournaments ==
- Hastings International Chess Congress won by Frank Parr, 1939/40.
- Havana won by Isaac Kashdan ahead of Georges Koltanowski, January 1940.
- Beverwijk (the 3rd Hoogovenschaaktoernoi) won by Max Euwe, January 1940.
- Warsaw (a prison tournament), won by Moishe Lowtzky ahead of Stanisław Kohn, January/February 1940.
- Budapest (Maroczy Jubilaeum) won by Euwe followed by Milan Vidmar, Gedeon Barcza, etc.
- Amsterdam (VAS), won by Hans Kmoch followed by Adriaan de Groot, Salo Landau and Lodewijk Prins, etc.
- Amsterdam (VVGA), won by Euwe ahead of Prins.
- Baarn (Quadrangular), won by Landau ahead of Euwe and Kmoch, and Haije Kramer.
- Delft (Quadrangular), won by Kmoch followed by Euwe, Johannes van den Bosch, and Landau.
- Leeuwarden won jointly by Nicolaas Cortlever, Prins and Landau.
- Rotterdam won by Euwe ahead of Vlagsma.
- The Hague won by George Salto Fontein ahead of Arthur Wijnans.
- Ghent (the Belgian Chess Championship), won by Paul Devos.
- Santiago de Cuba won by Koltanowski ahead of Diez.
- Santiago de Chile (the Chilean Chess Championship), won by Mariano Castillo.
- Montevideo (the Uruguayan Chess Championship), won by Arturo Liebstein.
- Rio de Janeiro (Torneio Nacional de Selecao), won by Walter Cruz, February/March 1940.
- Buenos Aires (the 19th Argentine Chess Championship, Torneo Mayor) won by Aristide Gromer followed by Franciszek Sulik, Carlos Guimard, etc.
- Lvov (West Ukrainian championship), won by Abram Khavin, March 1940.
- Rosario won by Gideon Ståhlberg.
- Stockholm (unofficial Swedish Chess Championship), won by Nils Bergkvist.
- Randers (the Danish Chess Championship), won by Jens Enevoldsen.
- Güstrow won by Carl Ahues and Lachmann, start 20 March 1940.
- London (Easter) won by Harry Golombek and Paul List ahead of Vera Menchik-Stevenson, March 1940.
- New York City (the 3rd U.S. Chess Championship), won by Samuel Reshevsky, 27 April – 19 May 1940.
- Bad Elster won by Karl Gilg and Ludwig Roedl, start 14 May 1940.
- Berlin won by Efim Bogoljubow ahead of Kurt Richter, start 16 June 1940.
- Berlin (the Berlin City Chess Championship), won by Rudolf Palme, June 1940.
- Posen won by Ahues and Elstner, July 1940.
- Nice (the French Chess Championship), won by Amédée Gibaud.
- Sofia (the Bulgarian Chess Championship), won by Oleg Neikirch and Alexander Tsvetkov.
- Dublin (the Irish Chess Championship), won by John O'Hanlon.
- Montreal (the 44th Canadian Chess Championship), won by Maurice Fox.
- Ventnor City won by Milton Hanauer and Sidney Bernstein.
- Dallas (the 41st U.S. Open), won by Reuben Fine ahead of Herman Steiner, August 1940.
- Bad Oeynhausen (the 7th German Chess Championship), won by Georg Kieninger ahead of Paul Felix Schmidt, start 4 August 1940.
- Rakovník (the Bohemia and Moravia Chess Championship), won by Jan Foltys, 17–31 August 1940.
- Lvov won by Edward Gerstenfeld ahead of Izaak Appel, August 1940.
- Danzig won by Walter John ahead of Gustav Rogmann, September 1940.
- Leningrad (Quadrangular), won by Viacheslav Ragozin.
- Leningrad (the 15th Leningrad City Chess Championship) won by Ilya Rabinovich.
- Kiev (USSR championship, semi-final), won by Gerstenfeld and Stolberg.
- Moscow (the 12th USSR Chess Championship), won jointly by Igor Bondarevsky and Andor Lilienthal, followed by Vasily Smyslov, Paul Keres, Isaac Boleslavsky and Mikhail Botvinnik, etc., 5 September – 3 October 1940.
- Kiev (the 12th Ukrainian Chess Championship), won by Boleslavsky ahead of David Bronstein.
- Kraków/Krynica/Warsaw (the 1st General Government Chess Championship), won by Bogoljubow and Anton Kohler, 3–17 November 1940.
- Posen (Quadrangular), won by Rogmann.
- Prague (the Kautsky Memorial), won by Josef Dobiáš.
- Melbourne (the Pietzcker Christmas Tournament), won by Lazare Suchowolski, December 1940.
- Sydney (the New South Wales championship), won by Lajos Steiner followed by Gary Koshnitsky, Cecil Purdy, etc., 1940/41.

== Matches ==
- Paul Keres won against Max Euwe (7.5 : 6.5) in The Netherlands (various places) in 1939/40.
- Carlos Maderna defeated Luis Piazzini (8 : 6), Buenos Aires, Argentina (the 18th ARG-ch).
- Walter Cruz beat Octavio Trompowsky (5.5 : 1.5), Rio de Janeiro, Brazil.
- Georg Kieninger defeated Wilhelm Ernst (6 : 4), Cologne, Germany.
- Georg Kieninger defeated Wilhelm Ernst (5.5 : 4.5), Gelsenkirchen, Germany.
- Georg Kieninger beat Immo Engert (7.5 : 2.5), Düsseldorf, Germany.
- Mikhail Botvinnik beat Viacheslav Ragozin (8.5 : 3.5), Leningrad, Russia.
- Grigory Levenfish won against Vladimir Alatortsev (8.5 : 5.5), Russia.

== Births ==
- 8 February – Boris Kogan, Russian/American IM
- 15 May – Carlos Bielicki, Argentine IM, 1959 World Junior Champion
- 2 June – István Csom in Satoraljaujhely, Hungarian GM
- 7 June – Liudmila Belavenets in Moscow, Russian ICCGM and Women's World Correspondence Champion 1984–1992
- 2 August – Adrian Hollis in Bristol, English ICCGM
- 8 August – Dragutin Sahovic in Kraljevo, Yugoslavian/Serbian GM
- 24 September – Renato Naranja, Filipino IM
- 26 September – Vladimir Savon in Chernihiv, Soviet/Ukrainian GM, USSR Champion in 1971
- 7 October – Liu Wenzhe, Chinese IM and trainer
- 10 November – Miodrag Todorcevic in Belgrade, Serbian/French GM and coach
- 19 December – Juzefs Petkēvičs, Latvian GM
- Andrew Kalotay, Hungarian-born Canadian/American chess player

== Deaths ==
- ca. March - Dawid Przepiórka killed in a mass execution by the Nazis in Palmiry.
- ca. March - Achilles Frydman killed in a mass execution in Palmiry.
- ca. March - Stanisław Kohn killed in a mass execution in Palmiry.
- ca. March - Moishe Lowtzky killed in a mass execution in Palmiry.
- 5 May - Willi Schlage died in Berlin, Germany.
- 4 July - Sammi Fajarowicz died in the Jewish Hospital in Leipzig (Leipziger Israelische Krankenhaus) of tuberculosis. Fajarowicz Gambit.
- 18 July – Davide Marotti, winner of the first Italian Championship
- 11 September - Peter Fyfe died in Glasgow, Scotland. Fyfe Gambit.
- 30 November - Wilhelm Hilse died in Germany.
- December - Walter John died in Berlin, Germany.
- December - František Schubert died in the Protectorate of Bohemia and Moravia.
- Moshe Hirschbein, Polish master, died by the Nazis.
- Max Walter, Slovak master, died by the Nazis.
- Arthur Kaufmann, Austrian master, died by the Nazis. Other sources give 1938 as the year of his death. He was a philosopher and ended his chess career in 1917. No philosophical works by him or photographs of him survive. His burial site was destroyed during the bombing of WWII.
- Kalikst Morawski, Polish master, died probably in Siberia.
