= Berlin City Chess Championship =

The Berlin Chess Championship is an annual chess tournament in Germany. The first unofficial Berlin Chess Championship was held in 1853, and Jean Dufresne won a match against Max Lange. Since 1904, official Berlin championships have taken place. The first event was won by Horatio Caro, followed by Ossip Bernstein, Rudolf Spielmann, Wilhelm Cohn, Benjamin Blumenfeld, etc.

As a result of the post-war division of the city into East Berlin and West Berlin, from 1953 until 1990 two separate championships were held. Since the 1991 reunification of Germany, the Berlin championships are again held as single events.

== Berlin Champions ==
Year	Winner
1904	Horatio Caro
1905	Horatio Caro, Moritz Lewitt
1906	Erich Cohn
1908	Wilhelm Cohn
1909	Moritz Lewitt
1910	Richard Teichmann
1911	Carl Ahues
1919	Karl Stephan
1920	Ernst Schweinburg
1921	Willi Schlage
1922	Kurt Richter
1923	Kurt Richter
1924	Carl Ahues, Richard Teichmann
1925	Friedrich Sämisch
1926	Willi Schlage
1927	Berthold Koch
1928	Karl Helling
1929	Carl Ahues, Kurt Richter
1930	Kurt Richter, Ludwig Rellstab, Simon Rotenstein
1932	Karl Helling
1933	Kurt Richter, Berthold Koch
1934	Carl Ahues, Friedrich Sämisch
1935	Efim Bogoljubow, Kurt Richter
1936	Kurt Richter
1937	Ludwig Rellstab
1938	Kurt Richter
1939	Franz Mölbitz
1940	Rudolf Palme
1941	Ludwig Rellstab
1942	Josef Grammatikoff
1943	Rudolf Teschner
1944	Rudolf Teschner
1946	Berthold Koch
1947	Rudolf Teschner
1948	Kurt Richter
1949	Gerhard Pfeiffer
1950	Rudolf Teschner
1951	Berthold Koch
1952	Rudolf Teschner

== West Berlin and East Berlin Champions ==
Year	West Berlin Winner	East Berlin Winner
1953	Rudolf Teschner	
1954	Klaus Darga	
1955	Klaus Uwe Müller	
1956	Heinz Lehmann	
1957	Rudolf Teschner	
1958	Wolfram Bialas	Werner Golz
1959	Klaus Darga	
1960	Alfred Seppelt	Bodo Starck
1961	Hans-Joachim Hecht	Hermann Brameyer
1962	Wolfram Bialas	Klaus Tiemer
1963	Harald Lieb	Alfred Barwich
1964	Adolf Delander	
1965	Hans-Joachim Hecht	Hermann Brameyer
1966	Adolf Delander	Lothar Kollberg
1967	Jürgen Dueball	Hermann Brameyer
1968	Harald Lieb	Franz Stahl
1969	Hans-Joachim Hecht	Bodo Starck
1970	Harald Lieb	Bodo Starck
1971	Werner Reichenbach	Bodo Starck
1972	Harald Lieb	Wolfgang Rohde
1973	Harald Lieb	Hans-Jürgen Meißner
1974	Werner Reichenbach	Bodo Starck
1975	Horst Bach	Friedrich Baumbach
1976	Werner Reichenbach	Lothar Kollberg
1977	Harald Lieb	Joachim Fechner
1978	Wolfgang Riedel	Wolfgang Thormann
1979	Norbert Sprotte	Lothar Kollberg
1980	Michael Bilek	Jörg Seils
1981	Harald Lieb	Wolfgang Thormann
1982	no contest	Ralf Rennoch
1983	Frank Grzesik	Bodo Starck
1984	no contest	Bodo Starck
1985	Mladen Muše	Alexander Okrajek
1986	no contest	Jörg Seils
1987	Mladen Muše	Alexander Okrajek
1988	Steve Brooke	Wolfgang Rohde
1989	Mladen Muše	Jörg Seils
1990	no contest	Matthias Schöwel

== Berlin Champions ==
Year	Winner
1991	Jörg Seils
1993	Jörg Seils
1994	Alexander Lagunow
1995	Alexander Lagunow
1996	Alexander Lagunow
1997	Robert Rabiega
1998	Manfred Glienke
1999	Ulf von Herman
2000	Robert Rabiega
2001	Ulf von Herman
2002	Sergey Kalinitschew
2003	Jakov Meister
2004	Jakov Meister
2005	Jakov Meister
2006	Ulf von Herman
2007	Jakob Meister
2008	Ulf von Herman
2009	Ulf von Herman
2010	René Stern
2011	René Stern
2012	René Stern
2013	Sergey Kalinitschew
2014	René Stern
2015	Sergey Kalinitschew, Hendrik Möller
2016	Jakov Meister
2017	Jakov Meister
2018	Atila Gajo Figura
2019	Johannes Florstedt
2020-2021	no championship
2022	Johannes Florstedt
