= Simon Rotenstein =

German chess player

Simon Rotenstein (born c. 1890 – died ?) was a German chess master.

At the beginning of his career, he shared 2nd with Wilhelm Cohn, behind Carl Ahues, in Berlin championships in 1911, and won in Winterturnier des SK Springer the same year. He played in two friendly matches Berlin vs. Prague in 1913 and 1914.

After World War I, he won in Blitzturnier der Berliner Schachgesellschaft and won in Winterturniers des Berliner Schachvereins in 1919, tied for 5-6th in Berlin-ch in 1919, shared 3rd at Berlin 1920 (DSB Congress, II. Hauptturnier), took 3rd, behind Alexey Selezniev and Friedrich Sämisch, at Berlin 1920, took 4th in Berlin-ch in 1921 (Willi Schlage won), tied for 7-8th at Bad Oeynhausen 1922 (German Chess Championship, Hauptturnier), took 2nd, behind Otto Wegemund, in Winterturnier des Berliner Schachvereins in 1923, and played in a match Berlin vs. Prague/Brno in 1923.

He took 10th at Berlin (Café König) 1928 (Efim Bogoljubow won), and tied for 5-8th in Berlin-ch in 1929. His best achievement was the first place (jointly with Ludwig Rellstab and Kurt Richter) in the Berlin City Chess Championship in 1930. Then he tied for 7-8th at Frankfurt 1930 (Hauptturnier), tied for 11-12th at Berlin 1932, and played in a telephone match Berlin vs. Hamburg in December 1932.

During the Nazi period in Germany, he won jointly with Sammi Fajarowicz and Jankel Mundsztuk in Jüdische Meisterschaft Deutschlands at Leipzig 1935.
