= 1918 in chess =

Events in chess in 1918:

== Chess events in brief ==
- Ossip Bernstein was arrested and imprisoned by the Cheka (Bolshevik secret police) in Odessa, during the Russian Civil War in 1918. Bernstein's crime was his role as a legal advisor to bankers. There was no court trial. A minor official had a firing squad line up Bernstein and a number of other prisoners against a wall to be shot. A superior official appeared and asked to see the list of prisoners’ names. Discovering Ossip Bernstein on the list, he asked Bernstein if he was the famous chess master. Not satisfied with Bernstein's affirmative reply, he made him play a game with him. If Bernstein lost or drew, he would be shot. Bernstein won in short order and was released. Soon, he escaped on a British ship and settled in France.
- The British Chess Problem Society held its inaugural meeting on 10 August. It is the world's oldest chess problem society.

== Tournaments ==
- Vienna (the 9th Trebitsch Memorial) (Quadrangular), won by Milan Vidmar followed by Savielly Tartakower, Carl Schlechter, and Lajos Asztalos. November 1917 - January 1918.
- The Hague, won by George Salto Fontein. December 1917 - January 1918.
- London (the 28th London championship), won jointly by Philip Walsingham Sergeant, E. Macdonald and G.E. Wainwright, ahead of Edward Guthlac Sergeant and Theodor Germann, 1917/18.
- London (Triangular), play-off won by G.E. Wainwright ahead of P.W. Sergeant and E. Macdonald.
- Amsterdam (Quadrangular), won by Max Marchand.
- Arnhem, won by Marchand and Meijer.
- Moscow (Triangular), won by Alexander Alekhine ahead of Vladimir Nenarokov, and Abram Rabinovich.
- Copenhagen won by Johannes Giersing ahead of J. Juhl and Jørgen Møller.
- Berlin (Quadrangular), won by Vidmar, followed by Schlechter, Jacques Mieses, and Akiba Rubinstein. April 20-30.
- Nijmegen (Quadrangular), won by R.A.J. Meijer, June 1–2.
- Scheveningen, won by Rudolf Loman and P.J.H. Baudet.
- Breslau, won by Walter John followed by Otto Wegemund, Hermann von Gottschall, etc. July 1918.
- Rye Beach, N.Y., won by Abraham Kupchik ahead of Oscar Chajes, Jacob Bernstein, Roy Turnbull Black and Charles Jaffe. July 22–26.
- Kaschau won by Richard Réti followed by Vidmar, Gyula Breyer, Schlechter, Asztalos, etc. August 5–19.
- Gothenburg won by Karl Berndtsson ahead of Gustaf Nyholm. August 11–18.
- Chicago (the 19th U.S. Open), won by Boris Kostić ahead of Edward Lasker, John Stuart Morrison, Norman Tweed Whitaker and H. Hahlbohm, September 22–28.
- Berlin (Quadrangular), won by Emanuel Lasker ahead of Rubinstein, Schlechter, and Siegbert Tarrasch. September 28 - October 11.
- 's-Hertogenbosch (Quadrangular), won by Jan Willem te Kolsté and Gerard Oskam, ahead of Marchand. October 12–13.
- New York (rapid tournament), won by Jaffe and Kostić, ahead of Jacob Rosenthal. October 1918.
- New York (Manhattan CC), won by José Raúl Capablanca followed by Kostić, Frank James Marshall, Chajes, Dawid Janowski, Black, and Morrison. November 1918.
- Budapest (Pentagonal), won by Zoltán von Balla and Réti, followed by Breyer, Kornél Havasi, and Schlechter. December 1918.
- Amsterdam, won by W. Fick ahead of Henri Weenink. December 1918 - January 1919.

== Matches ==
- Akiba Rubinstein won against Carl Schlechter (3.5 : 2.5) in Berlin, January 21–29.
- Adolf Albin beat Richard Réti (1.5 : 0.5) in Vienna.
- Oscar Chajes defeated Dawid Janowski (11 : 9) in New York.

== Births ==
- 7 March – Miroslav Katětov, Prague City Champion, Czech IM.
- 14 December – Kaarle Ojanen in Helsinki. Finnish Champion and IM.
- 19 December – Max Blau in Munich, Germany. Swiss Champion and IM.

== Deaths ==
- Artur Popławski died in Warsaw. Polish master, Swiss Champion.
- 10 April - Peter Alexandrovich Saburov, Russian master, died in Petrograd (St. Petersburg), Russia.
- 23 August – Erich Cohn, German master, died in France in the western front as a field doctor, at the end of World War I.
- 27 December - Carl Schlechter, Austrian grandmaster, died of malnutrition in Budapest, Hungary.
