= Karl Helling =

German chess player (1904–1937)

Karl Helling (10 August 1904, Luckenwalde, Brandenburg – 15 August 1937, Berlin) was a German chess master.

In 1928, he shared 1st with Kurt Richter in the Berlin City Chess Championship, and won a play-off match for the title against him (2 : 0). He also won the Berlin-ch in 1932. Helling represented Germany in the 4th Chess Olympiad at Prague 1931.

In other tournaments, he tied for 7-10th at Chemnitz 1925, tied for 5-6th in the Berlin-ch 1927 (Berthold Koch won), took 5th at Berlin (BSG) 1928 (Aron Nimzowitsch won); tied for 2nd-3rd, behind Richter, at Wiesbaden 1928; tied for 5-6th at Leipzig 1928 (Max Blümich won), took 9th at Berlin (Kaffee König) 1928 (Efim Bogoljubow won), tied for 4-7th at Duisburg 1929 (DSB Congress, Carl Ahues won). Helling won, ahead of Salo Flohr, at Zwickau 1930; won ahead of Ehrhardt Post and Richter, at Berlin 1930; and took 2nd, behind Isaac Kashdan, at Berlin 1930 (Quadrangular).

In 1931, he lost a short match to Gösta Stoltz (0.5 : 1.5) in Berlin, tied for 2nd-4th, behind Herman Steiner, in Berlin, tied for 4-6th at Swinemünde (27th DSB Congress, Bogoljubow and Ludwig Roedl won), and took 4th in Berlin (BSG, Ludwig Rellstab won). Then he took 5th at Berlin 1932 (Mokadoro), took 3rd in the Berlin-ch 1933, took 10th at Bad Aachen 1933 (Bogoljubov won), and tied for 5-9th at Bad Pyrmont 1933 (1st German Chess Championship, Bogoljubow won). He tied for 8-9th at Dresden 1936 (Alexander Alekhine won), took 4th in the Berlin-ch 1937 (Rellstab won), and tied for 6-7th at Berlin 1937 (BSG, Fritz Sämisch won).
