= Lothar Schmid =

German chess grandmaster (1928–2013)

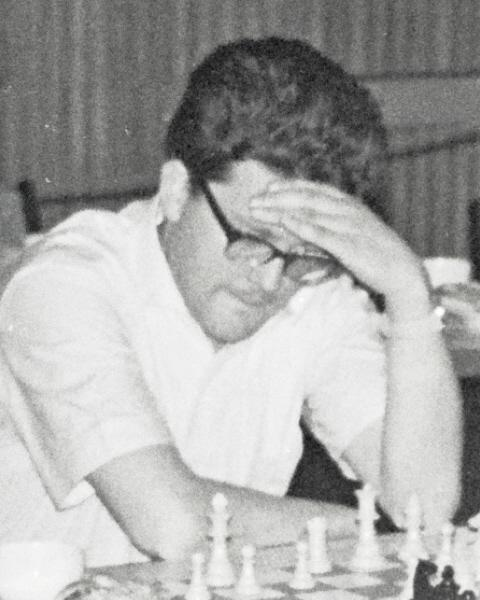
- Schmid at Oberhausen in 1961

Personal information
- Full name: Lothar Maximilian Lorenz Schmid
- Born: 10 May 1928 Radebeul, Saxony, Germany
- Died: 18 May 2013 (aged 85) Bamberg, Germany

Chess career
- Country: Germany
- Title: ICCF Grandmaster (1959); FIDE Grandmaster (1959); FIDE International Arbiter (1975)
- Peak rating: 2550 (July 1971)
- Peak ranking: No. 32 (July 1971)
- ICCF peak rating: 2691 (July 1992)

Lothar Maximilian Lorenz Schmid (10 May 1928 – 18 May 2013) was a German chess grandmaster. He was born in Radebeul in Saxony into a family who were the co-owners of the Karl May Press, which published the German Karl May adventure novels.

He was best known as the chief arbiter at several World Chess Championship matches, in particular the 1972 encounter between Bobby Fischer and Boris Spassky at Reykjavík. He was also an avid collector of chess books and paraphernalia. It was reputed that he owned the largest known private chess library in the world, as well as a renowned collection of chess art, chessboards and chess pieces from around the globe.

== Playing career ==
=== German championships ===
In 1941, at the age of 13, Schmid won the Dresden chess championship which marked the beginning of his chess career. In 1943, he took second place in Vienna (German Juniors Championship). In June 1947, he tied for first place with Gerhard Pfeiffer in Wiessenfels (SBZ-ch). In April 1948, he tied for second place in Celle when Carl Ahues won. In September 1948, he tied for fourth place at the full German Chess Championship (12th GER-ch) in Essen. The event was won by Wolfgang Unzicker. In May 1949, he took third place in Bad Pyrmont (13th GER-ch). The event was won by Efim Bogoljubow. In August 1949, he tied for first place in Grossröhrsdorf. In October 1955, he was second behind Klaus Darga in Hoechst (third FRG-ch), having won a qualifying event in Nuremberg the same year. In October 1959, he took second place, behind Unzicker, in Nuremberg (5th FRG-ch).

=== International tournaments and matches ===
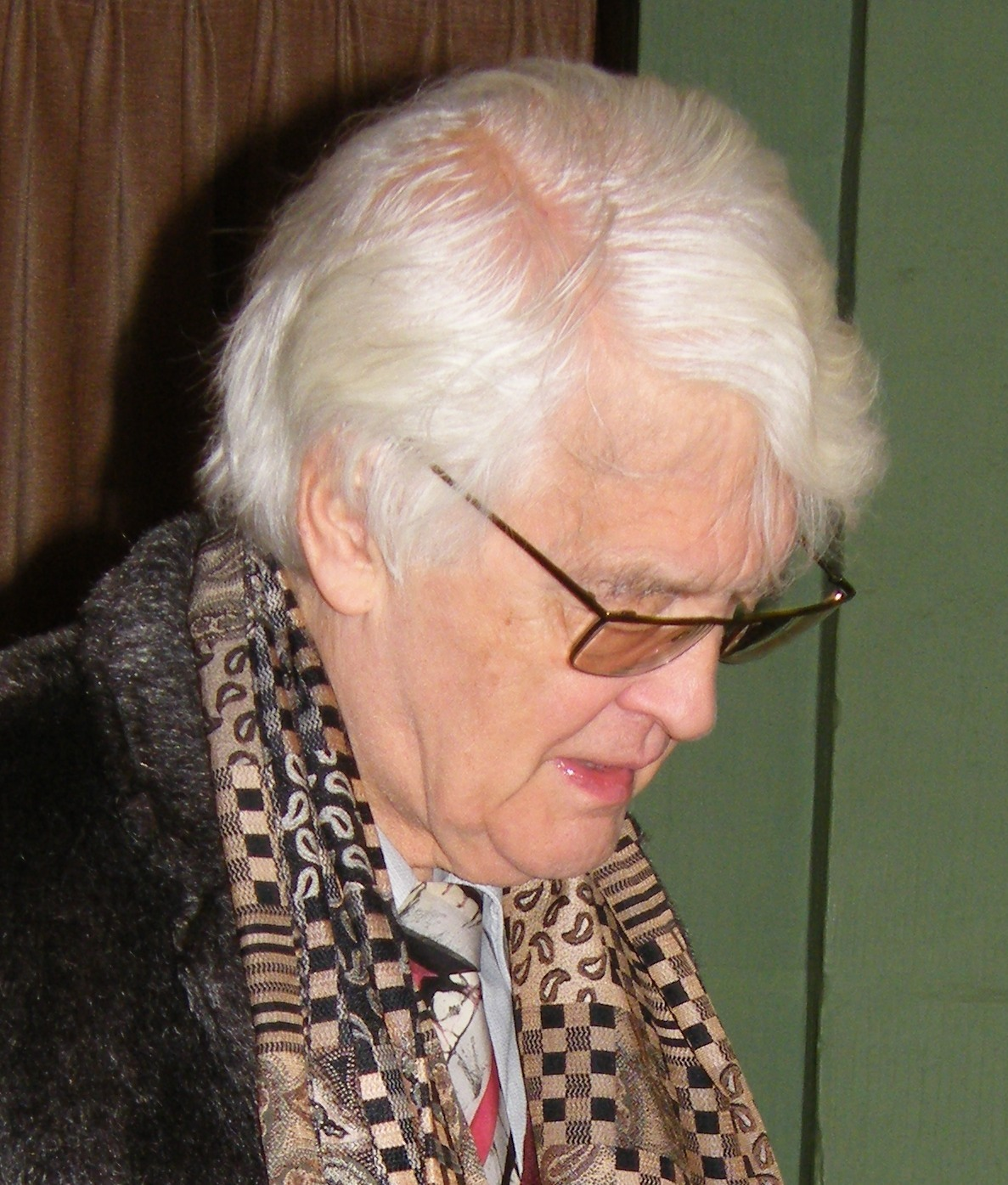
Schmid in 2008

In 1950, he drew a match with Wade in Bamberg, 4–4. In 1951, he won in Travemünde. In 1951–52, he took third place in Hastings (Svetozar Gligorić won). In 1953, he tied for second place behind Esteban Canal in Venice. In 1954, he won in Zürich and at Bad Kissingen. In 1956, he won in Gothenburg. In 1957, he held the fourth place in Dublin; a zonal qualifier tournament won by Luděk Pachman. In 1961, he tied for fourth place in Zürich. In 1963, he tied for second place in Málaga. In 1964, he won the South African Open, held in "The Wilderness". In 1968 in his home town of Bamberg, he tied for second place with Tigran Petrosian who was the world champion at the time, behind Paul Keres, an outcome described by the Oxford Companion to Chess as "Schmid's greatest playing achievement". In 1970, he won the Mar del Plata. In 1971, he finished equal second with two others in Adelaide. In 1979, he tied for third place in Lugano. In 1980, he won the fifth edition of the BBC's The Master Game series, ahead of Viktor Korchnoi and Vlastimil Hort.

=== Olympiads ===
Lothar Schmid played for West Germany at eleven Chess Olympiads.

- In 1950, at second board at the 9th Olympiad in Dubrovnik (+7−1=4)
- In 1952, at second board at the 10th Olympiad in Helsinki (+7−1=4)
- In 1954, at second board at the 11th Olympiad in Amsterdam (+6−4=3)
- In 1956, at second board at the 12th Olympiad in Moscow (+4−2=7)
- In 1958, at third board at the 13th Olympiad in Munich (+6−3=4)
- In 1960, at second board at the 14th Olympiad in Leipzig (+7−2=5)
- In 1962, at third board at the 15th Olympiad in Varna (+4−2=2)
- In 1964, at third board in at the 16th Olympiad Tel Aviv (+7−2=5)
- In 1968, at second board in at the 18th Olympiad Lugano (+6−0=6)
- In 1970, at second board in at the 19th Olympiad Siegen (+7−1=4)
- In 1974, at first board in at the 21st Olympiad Nice (+5−3=7)

=== Team competitions ===
He won four individual silver medals (1950, 1952, 1968, 1970) and two team bronze medals (1950, 1964).

Representing his national team, he also competed for the Clare Benedict Cup on twelve occasions. He won nine gold, one silver, and two bronze medals in the period 1957–73.

=== Correspondence chess ===
In correspondence chess, he won the first German Championship (1950–1952), the first Eduard Dyckhoff Memorial (1954–1956), and came second with Lucius Endzelins, behind Viacheslav Ragozin, in the second World Correspondence Championship (1956–1959).

=== International titles ===
Schmid was awarded the International Master title in 1951, and the Grandmaster title in 1959.

== Arbiter ==
Schmid was awarded the International Arbiter title in 1975. He was the chief arbiter for the Fischer–Spassky 1972, Karpov–Korchnoi 1978, Kasparov–Karpov 1986 World Championship matches, and for the Fischer–Spassky 1992 'Revenge Match'. All of the matches involved cut-throat battles both on and off the board and required a lot of professionalism to handle. Managing those made Schmid recognized as the world's leading chess arbiter.

Schmid was featured in the 2014 Bobby Fischer biopic Pawn Sacrifice, which depicted the 1972 contest between Fischer and Spassky, played by the actor Brett Watson.

== Collector ==
Among the many rare books he owned was one of only ten copies that have survived of the first-ever printed chess manual Repetición d'Amores y Arte de Ajedrez, published in Salamanca in 1497.

== Notable games ==
- Schmid vs. Walter Sahlmann, Essen 1948, 12th GER-ch, Sicilian, Chameleon, B20, 1–0
- Efim Bogoljubow vs. Schmid, Bad Pyrmont 1949, 13th GER-ch, Scotch Game, Schmid Gambit, C47, 0–1 Desperado piece!
- Schmid vs. Herman Steiner (USA), Dubrovnik 1950, 9th Olympiad, Sicilian, O'Kelly Variation, B28, 1–0
- Juan Carlos Gonzales Zamora (CUB) vs. Schmid, Helsinki 1952, 10th Olympiad, English Opening, King's English Variation, Reversed Sicilian, A21, 0–1 Classical ending mastery.
- Schmid vs. Paul Keres (URS), Tel Aviv 1964, 16th Olympiad, Ruy Lopez, Closed, C92, 1–0 After a long and exhausting battle White broke down Black's resistance.
- Grantel Gibbs (HKG) vs. Schmid, Lugano 1968, 18th Olympiad, Alekhine's Defense, B02, 0–1 Shortest decisive game of the Olympiad.
- Schmid vs. Bent Larsen, San Juan 1969, Sicilian, Richter–Rauzer Variation, B60, 1–0
- Schmid vs. Anton Kinzel (AUT), Siegen 1970, 19th Olympiad, Russian Game, Modern Attack, C43, 1–0 Best game prize winner.
