= Willi Schlage =

German chess player

Willi Schlage (24 December 1888 – 5 May 1940 in Berlin) was a German chess master and trainer. Active as a player during the inter-war years of the Weimar Republic and later as a trainer during the rise of the Third Reich, Schlage is remembered for a game depicted in the science fiction film 2001: A Space Odyssey, which chess writers attributed to him. He is also known for an endgame position attributed to a game played with Carl Ahues, frequently presented as an example in endgame literature.

== Career ==
In 1910, Schlage won a tournament in Hamburg (DSB Congress, Hauptturnier-B). He played in friendly matches: Berlin–Prague (1913), Berlin–Holland (1920), Germany–Netherlands (1922), and Germany–Sweden (1922). Schlage twice won the Berlin City Chess Championship in 1921 and 1926.

During the inter-war period Schlage was active in the lively chess culture of Berlin, where tournaments were commonly held at cafés and restaurants. In 1925 Schlage was photographed participating in a simultaneous exhibition against then-champion José Raúl Capablanca.

In wider competition, Schlage posted middling results. He took 3rd place at Hamburg 1921 (21st DSB-Congress, Ehrhardt Post won), tied for 3rd–5th at Bad Oeynhausen 1922 (22nd DSB-Congress, Post won), tied for 11th–13th at Berlin 1928 (BSG, Aron Nimzowitsch won), tied for 5th–7th at Berlin 1930 (Karl Helling won), tied for 7th–8th in the Berlin-ch 1932 (Helling won), tied for 8th–9th at Swinemünde 1932 (Gösta Stoltz won), tied for 6th–7th in the Berlin-ch 1933 (Berthold Koch and Kurt Richter won), tied for 11th-13th at Bad Aachen 1935 (3rd German Championship, Richter won), tied for 3rd–4th at Berlin 1937 (BSG-B, Carlos Guimard and Ludwig Rellstab won), and tied for 4th–7th at Krefeld 1938 (Erich Eliskases and Ludwig Engels won). These performances led Tim Krabbé to criticize Schlage as "a player of second-level prominence. You come across his name in old German combination books, more often as the loser than as the winner, and in a few German tournaments, more often near the bottom than near the top." On the other hand, Schlage was ranked as the world's 31st best player in a statistical analysis corresponding to his peak performance (August 1923), which indicated a level of play typical of a grandmaster.

=== Trainer ===
In 1935, Schlage became Reichstrainer des Großdeutschen Schachbundes (Chief Trainer of the German Chess Federation). Together with Alexander Alekhine and Efim Bogoljubow, he trained the German national team for the 3rd unofficial Chess Olympiad at Munich 1936. In August 1939, he trained the best young German players (Klaus Junge (15 years old), Wolfgang Unzicker (14), Edith Keller (17), Karl Krbavic (17), Rudolf Kunath (15), etc.) in Fürstenwalde (Jugendschachwoche).

== Legacy ==
=== Roesch vs. Schlage, 1910 ===
Roesch vs. Schlage, 1910

Position: a8 white queen, f8 black rook, g8 black king, c7 black pawn, e7 black bishop, f7 black pawn, g7 black pawn, h7 black pawn, a6 black pawn, b5 black pawn, e5 black knight, f4 black knight, c3 white pawn, d3 black queen, h3 black bishop, a2 white pawn, b2 white pawn, d2 white pawn, f2 white pawn, g2 white pawn, h2 white pawn, a1 white rook, b1 white knight, c1 white bishop, d1 white bishop, f1 white rook, g1 white king

Position following 13...Bh3, shown as the starting position in the film 2001. Both the real game and the fragment depicted in the film concluded 14.Qxa6 Bxg2 15.Re1 Qf3 0–1.

In 1910 in Hamburg, Schlage defeated Roesch in a 15-move miniature which opened with the Ruy Lopez; the game was later reproduced in a 1955 collection by Irving Chernev. In the 1968 film 2001: A Space Odyssey, a HAL 9000 supercomputer is shown defeating astronaut Frank Poole at the conclusion of a game, with moves and board positions identical to the conclusion of the Roesch–Schlage game. Chess writers have therefore attributed the film's game to Schlage's.

=== Schlage vs. Ahues, 1921 ===
Schlage vs. Ahues, 1921

Position: a7 black pawn, f7 white king, a6 white pawn, b2 black king

White to move and win

A frequently reproduced endgame problem is attributed to a game played by Schlage (White) and Ahues (Black) in Berlin, 1921. (Note: Although the position is reproduced frequently in chess literature and websites, the complete game is not reported at certain chess databases. In two databases, the only recorded game played between Schlage and Ahues in 1921 was a tournament game in Hamburg, with Ahues (Black) the winner, and significantly more material on the board at its final position. This is not, however, an indication that the Berlin game did not take place, but merely that it has not been included in modern databases. The Berlin 1921 game may have occurred as part of the Berlin City Championship.) Schlage had an opportunity to win, but he blundered with an incorrect king move, at which point Ahues was able to force a draw. The position has been discussed by Ilya Maizelis and Paul Keres, and later by Bruce Pandolfini and Jesus de la Villa.

Each player has two pieces: one pawn and one king, with White to move. The pawns block each other's paths, unable to move of their own accord, and the kings are posted at nearly equal distance from this deadlock. Each king must advance toward the deadlocked pawns, either with the aim of capturing the opposing pawn and thus clearing the way for promotion (thereby securing a win), or else by frustrating this design and thus denying the opponent a win, forcing a draw. At this point, the continuation actually played was 1.Ke6 Kc3 2.Kd6? Kd4 3.Kc6 Ke5 4.Kb7 Kd6 5.Kxa7 Kc7 ½–½. Once the black king occupies the critical c7-square and corners its white counterpart, it forces a draw, whether by threefold repetition, stalemate, or agreement. White should instead have played 2.Kd5!. With this move, the white king has just enough time to secure all the requirements for a win: capture the black pawn, get out of its own pawn's way, prevent Black from accessing the c7-square, and prevent Black from recapturing the white pawn. (Note: Keres and Pandolfini identify the correct line of play (for both players) as 1.Ke6 Kc3 2.Kd5 Kb4 3.Kc6 Ka5 4.Kb7 Kb5 5.Kxa7 Kc6 6.Kb8. Although de la Villa instead gives a correct line for White starting with 1.Ke6 Kc3 2.Kd5 Kd3, Keres notes that this line is inferior for Black. 2...Kd3 concedes an early waiting move which is not forced, whereas in the above line the waiting move 4...Kb5 is only played once Black is left with no other options.)

When presented as a problem, there are two points about the position. First, players can make tactical use of the fact that kings can never occupy adjacent squares—a king can never move into check. By moving one's king next to a square, the opponent's king is prevented from moving to that square on the following move. This technique is referred to as "bodychecking", or "shouldering". By playing 2.Kd5!, White forces Black to make a waiting move at some point, which loses time and fails to access c7. Second, the geometry of the chessboard—and the movement of the pieces—is non-Euclidean: a king can follow advantageous diagonal paths and still reach a given square in the same number of moves as if it had moved along a "straight line" in a given rank or file.

=== 1979 Mali chess stamps ===
In 1979, the African country Mali issued a quartet of stamps depicting chess masters; Alekhine, Bogoljubow, and Schlage were represented, together with Dawid Janowski. Tim Krabbé found Schlage's inclusion among much stronger players to be incongruous and suspected that the stamps were designed by a German, on account of the individuals' roles in German chess during the war (although Janowski had died in 1927). A correspondent later informed Krabbé that the stamps were executed by a French designer.
