= Rabiega =

Rabiega is a surname. Notable people with the surname include:

- Robert Rabiega (born 1971), German chess grandmaster
- Vincent Rabiega (born 1995), Polish footballer
