= Otto Wegemund =

German chess player

Otto Wegemund (1870 – 5 October 1928) was a German chess master.

== Biography ==
He participated many times in Berlin City Chess Championship; took 6th in 1906 (Erich Cohn won), took 10th in 1908 (Wilhelm Cohn won), took 10th in 1910 (Carl Ahues won), tied for 7-8th in 1920 (Ernst Schweinburg won), tied for 5-6th in 1924 (Ahues and Richard Teichmann won), shared 4th in 1925 (Friedrich Sämisch won), and tied for 9-10th in 1927 (Berthold Koch won).

He also played several times in the DSB Congress. Among others, he shared 6th at Coburg 1904 (Hauptturnier B, Hans Fahrni won), took 9th at Breslau 1912 (Hauptturnier B, Paul Krüger won), shared 1st with Wilhelm Hilse at Hamburg 1921 (Hauptturnier B), tied for 8-10th at Bad Oeynhausen 1922 (Ehrhardt Post won), and took 8th at Frankfurt 1923 (Ernst Grünfeld won).

In other tournaments, he took 5th at Berlin 1917 (Walter John and Paul Johner won), took 2nd, behind John, at Breslau 1918, and took 11th at Berlin 1920 (Alexey Selezniev won).
