= Wilhelm Ernest =

William Ernest may refer to:

- William Ernest, Grand Duke of Saxe-Weimar-Eisenach
- William Ernest, Duke of Saxe-Weimar

== See also ==
- Wilhelm Ernst (1905–1952), German chess master
