= Werner Golz =

German chess player

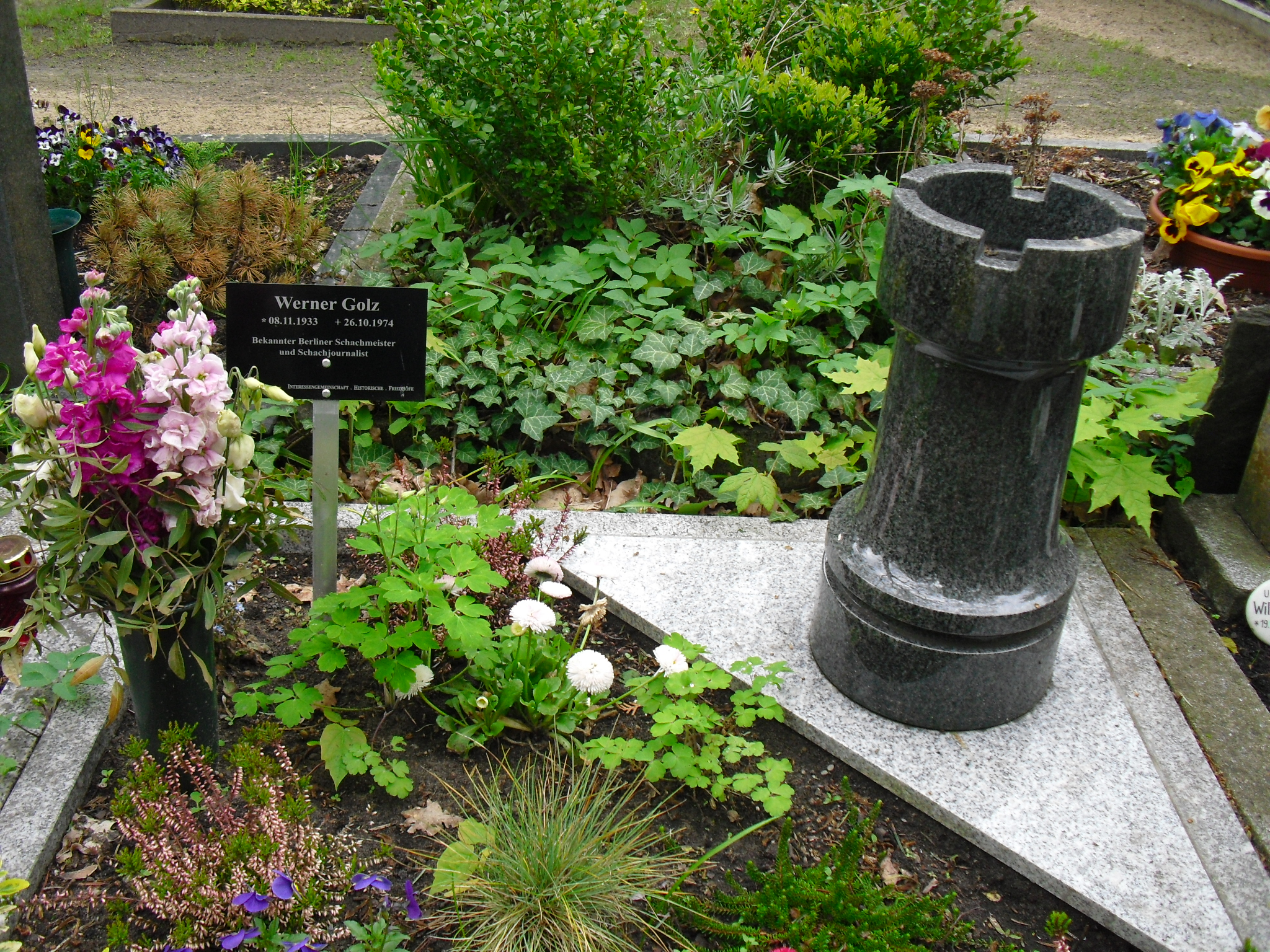
- The grave of Werner Golz

Personal information
- Born: 8 November 1933 Berlin, Germany
- Died: 26 October 1974 (aged 40) East Berlin, German Democratic Republic

Chess career
- Country: Germany

Werner Golz (8 November 1933 — 26 October 1974) was a German chess player and European Team Chess Championship team bronze medal winner (1970).

== Biography ==
In 1958, Werner Golz won East Berlin City Chess Championship. From 1957 to 1969, he participated in all East Germany Chess Championships finals, where he achieved good success. In 1957 he took the 3rd place, in 1964 in Magdeburg he shared 3rd-4th place, and in 1965 shared the 2nd-3rd place. The greatest success Werner Golz reached in 1959 in Leipzig, when he shared the first place, and only in the match for the title of East Germany champion gave way to Wolfgang Pietzsch. In 1964, Werner Golz won at the Berlin Open Chess Championship, and in 1970 he shared the 1st place in the Kurt Richter memorial tournament.

Werner Golz played for East Germany in the Chess Olympiads:

- In 1960, at second reserve board in the 14th Chess Olympiad in Leipzig (+4, =3, -4),
- In 1964, at reserve board in the 16th Chess Olympiad in Tel Aviv (+4, =4, -1).

Werner Golz played for East Germany in the European Team Chess Championship:

- In 1970, at ninth board in the 4th European Team Chess Championship in Kapfenberg (+3, =1, -2) and won team bronze medal.

Werner Golz worked in one of East Berlin's publish house as a proofreader and assistant editor. Since 1970, he was an independent journalist. Werner Golz had three children. He died after a long illness — stomach cancer. Buried in Berlin at Karlshorst.
