= Moritz Lewitt =

German chess player (1863–1936)

Personal information
- Born: Moritz Lewitt; August 12, 1863 Posen, Kingdom of Prussia (now Poznań, Poland)
- Died: April 1, 1936 (aged 72) Berlin, Germany

Chess career
- Country: Germany

Moritz Lewitt (12 August 1863 – 1 April 1936) was a German chess master.

Born in Poznań, Kingdom of Prussia, he lived in Berlin, and was the longtime president of the oldest German Chess Club, the Berliner Schachgesellschaft von 1827. When he was reelected in 1904, the club was also the largest in Germany, with over 150 members. Dr. Lewitt played in many tournaments in Berlin and elsewhere. He took 9th at Berlin 1891 (Horatio Caro won), took 4th at Dresden 1892 (the 7th DSB Congress, Hauptturnier A, Paul Lipke won), took 3rd at Kiel 1893 (the 8th DSB–Congress, Hauptturnier A, Hugo Süchting won), tied for 7-8th at Berlin 1893 (Simon Alapin won), tied for 3rd-5th at Leipzig 1894 (the 9th DSB–Congress, Hauptturnier A, Norman van Lennep won).

He took 2nd, behind Caro, and tied for 5-6th (Theodor von Scheve won), both in Berlin in 1894; took 13th at Munich 1900 (the 12th DSB–Congress, Hauptturnier A, Rudolf Swiderski won), shared 2nd, behind Ossip Bernstein, at Berlin 1902; tied for 3rd-4t at Coburg 1904 (the 12th DSB–Congress, Hauptturnier B, Hans Fahrni won). Lewitt won ahead of Rudolf Spielmann at Berlin 1904, shared 1st with Caro in the Berlin Championship in 1905 but lost a play-off match to him (+3 –4 =5), and tied for 7-8th at Berlin 1913 (Erich Cohn won).

- Chess games of Moritz Lewitt
