= William Ernest =

William Ernest may refer to:

- William Ernest, Grand Duke of Saxe-Weimar-Eisenach, last Grand Duke of Saxe-Weimar-Eisenach
- William Ernest, Duke of Saxe-Weimar
- Bill Ernest, Disney executive

== See also ==
- Wilhelm Ernst, German chess master
