= Sergey Kalinitschew =

German chess grandmaster (born 1956)

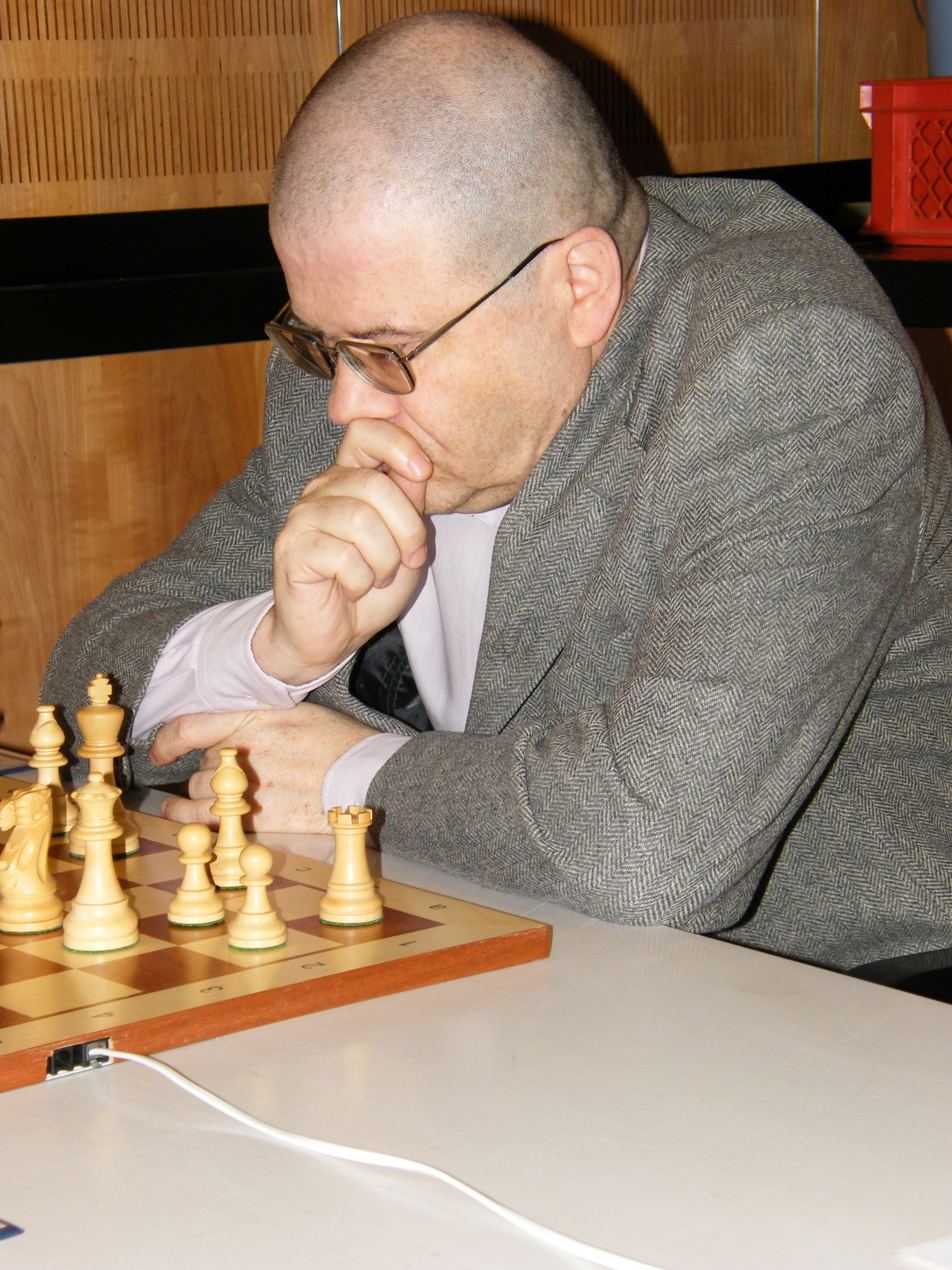
- Sergey Kalinitschew in 2008

Personal information
- Born: 3 February 1956 (age 70) Moscow, Russia

Chess career
- Country: Soviet Union (to 1991); Russia (from 1992 to 1995); Germany (from 1996)
- Title: Grandmaster (1997)
- Peak rating: 2533 (October 2004)

Sergey Kalinitschew (Russian: Сергей Леонидович Калиничев; born 3 February 1956) is a Russian-born German chess Grandmaster (GM, 1997) who won the German Chess Championship (2016).

== Biography ==
His interest in chess was sparked by a chess book that an uncle gave the ten-year-old. It was only at the age of 14 that he joined the chess department at the House of Pioneers in the Dzerzhinsky suburb of Moscow. Between 1974 and 1976 he did his military service in Khabarovsk. Then - back in Moscow - he acted as head of the same chess department where he started playing organized chess. From 1982 to 1984 he joined the Moscow Region Soviet Army as a chess player. There he accompanied Alexey Vyzmanavin, who won the USSR Chess Championship in 1990, and Andrei Kharitonov, who at that time International Master (IM) and became Grandmaster in 1993, as coach at the 1984 Soviet Individual Championship in Lviv. The championship was won by Andrei Sokolov – Vyshmanawin ended up 14th on the seed list according to Elo rating in ninth place, Kharitonov in last place. From 1984 Kalinichev was stationed as a chess player and trainer with the Group of Soviet Forces in Germany in Wünsdorf. Kalinichev's students as coaches in post-reunification Germany included Dimitri Bunzmann, Atila Gajo Figura and Ilja Brener. Kalinichev was married to the Estonian chess player Valeriya Gansvind, who holds the title FIDE Women's Master and with chess club SG Lasker Steglitz-Wilmersdorf in 1991/92 won the German Chess Women's Bundesliga (under the name of Valeria Kalinichewa). His son Andrej, born in 1986, is also a strong chess player with an Elo rating of over 2400 and he plays for Estonia.

== Achievements in chess ==
In 1974 and 1975, Kalinichev won the Red Army Juniors tournament, beating Vladimir Epishin, Gregory Kaidanov and Zigurds Lanka among others. In the Soviet Union, Kalinichev took part in army chess championships, as well as (regularly until 1982) in the Moscow City Chess Championships and occasional tournaments. After 1984 he was a regular guest at individual chess tournaments in the East Germany. There he won, for example, in 1985 the 5. Invitation tournament of the BSG Post Dresden. In 1987 he won the master tournament of the Dresden Chess Festival. In 1989 he won tournaments in Rostock, Warsaw (with Grandmaster norm) and East Berlin.

In the 1990s Kalinitschew played many tournaments in West Germany. In 1993 he won the 1. Lichtenrad Spring. He won the Staufer Open in Schwäbisch Gmünd in 1995 and 1998. In 1996 he won a First Saturday GM Tournament in Budapest where he defeated his student Dimitri Bunzmann accompanied. In 1997 he won the 2. Four Seasons Open in Pentling, the Three Rivers Open in Passau and the Hermannen Open in Kassel.

In 2001 Kalinitschew won the individual chess championship of the chess club Schachverband Schleswig-Holstein in Eckernförde.

In the 2000s Kalinitschew played chess tournaments mainly in Berlin. In 2000 he won the Kreuzberg Open for the first time, in 2002 the Berlin City Chess Championship and the Unicorn Open. In 2003 he won the 20. Travemünder Schachopen after missing out on second place in 1999 (behind Aloyzas Kveinys) and 2002 (behind Robert Rabiega). At the German Chess Championship in 2004 in Höckendorf he finished fourth, at the open Dutch chess championship in Dieren, Gelderland finished second behind Sergey Tiviakov that same year. In 2005 he won the 5. Gulweida-Warneyer Memorial Tournament, the Tempelhof Chess Club and the Lichtenrader Herbst. In 2007 he became Berlin individual champion in rapid chess. In 2007 and 2008 he won the Lichtenberger Sommer. In 2008 he also won the 9. Kreuzberg Open and the Memoriał Tadeusza Gniota in Police. In 2013 and 2015 he was able to win the Berlin City Chess Championship more times.

From 1979 to 1982 Kalinitschew was a player and coach of Torpedo Moscow. In East Germany he played club chess for Dynamo Potsdam from 1984, together with Rustem Dautov. After reunification, he first played for the Berlin club Lasker Steglitz, where he occupied the first board for ten years, then he went to the Lübecker SV, with which he in the Chess Bundesliga season 1999/2000 in the 1st Chess Bundesliga played. From 2001 to 2017 he played (interrupted by the 2009/10 season, in which he played in the 2nd Chess Bundesliga for SK Zehlendorf) for the SC Kreuzberg (among other things from 2002 to 2009 in the 1st league). In the 2018/19 season Kalinitschew is again active for the "Lübecker SV". In company chess he was several times Berlin and twice German champion with Gillette Berlin.

In 1978, the same year as Garry Kasparov, Kalinichev achieved the title of Master of Sports of the Soviet Union. In 1989 he became International Master (IM). He has held the title of Chess Grandmaster (GM) since 1997. In October 2016, Kalinichev won the German Chess Championship in Lübeck.

== Backgammon ==
In the German backgammon rankings from July 2015, Kalinitschew has an Elo rating of 1606.7 with an experience of 218, which puts him in 72nd place in Germany. In May 2005 he won the Berlin Backgammon Tournaments at Cafe Belmont in Tiergarten (Berlin) and in Friedenau. In April 2008 he won the champions tournament of the Berlin Masters.
