= Gustav Rogmann =

German chess player

Gustav Rogmann (8 May 1909 – July 1947) was a German chess master.

He took 2nd behind Wilhelm Ernst at Weidenau 1937, took 9th at Bochum 1937, tied for 6-7th at Berlin (BSG) 1937 (Fritz Sämisch won), and tied for 4-7th at Krefeld 1938 (Erich Eliskases and Ludwig Engels won).

During World War II, he shared 3rd at Posen 1940 (Carl Ahues and Rudolf Elstner won), took 2nd, behind Walter John, at Danzig 1940, won at Posen 1940 (Quadrangular), took 3rd at Posen 1943 (Paul Keres won), and took 3rd at Limburg 1947.
