= Klaus Uwe Müller =

German chess player

Personal information
- Born: 14 September 1915
- Died: 08.1989

Chess career
- Country: Germany

Klaus Uwe Müller (14 September 1915 — August 1989) was a German chess player.

== Biography ==
In the early 1950s Klaus Uwe Müller was one of the leading East Germany chess players. He played in first East Germany Chess Championships in 1950, 1951, 1953.

Klaus Uwe Müller played for East Germany in the Chess Olympiad:

- In 1952, at fourth board in the 10th Chess Olympiad in Helsinki (+7, =4, -4).

Klaus Uwe Müller moved to West Germany in the mid-1950s. In 1955, he won West Berlin City Chess Championship. In later years Klaus Uwe Müller rarely participated in chess tournaments.
