= Manfred Glienke =

German chess player

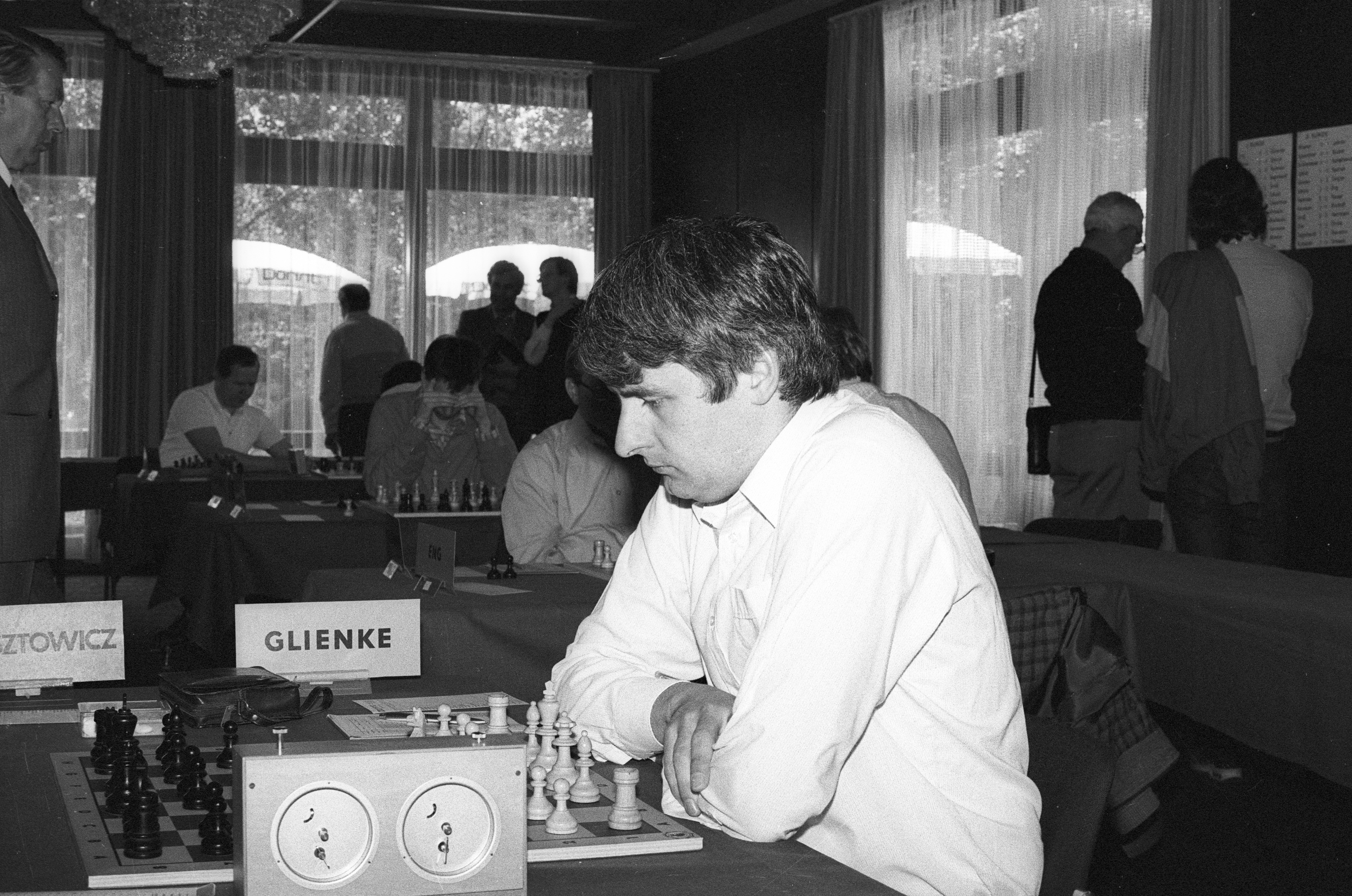

Personal information
- Born: 19 August 1954 (age 71) Hundshausen, Jesberg, Germany

Chess career
- Country: Germany
- Title: International Master (1999)
- Peak rating: 2419 (January 1999)

Manfred Glienke (born 19 August 1954) is a German chess International Master (IM, 1999) who won West Germany Chess Championship (1982).

== Biography ==
Manfred Glienke was one of the leading chess players in Germany in the early 1980s. He was participant of several West German and German Chess Championships. In 1982 in Bad Neuenahr-Ahrweiler Manfred Glienke won West Germany Chess Championship. In 1996 in Eger he won international chess tournament. In 1998 he won Berlin City Chess Championship.

With West German Chess Team Manfred Glienke participated in European Team Chess Championship in 1983. For many years Manfred Glienke competed in the German Chess Bundesliga. He played for the chess club Kreuzberg e.V..
