= Poole versus HAL 9000 =

Fictional chess game from Kubrick's 2001: A Space Odyssey

Animation of the Roesch–Schlage game

Poole vs. HAL 9000 is a chess game depicted in the 1968 science fiction film 2001: A Space Odyssey. Astronaut Frank Poole (White) plays the supercomputer HAL 9000 (Black) using a video screen as a chessboard. Each player takes turns during a game in progress, making their moves orally using descriptive notation and natural language. Poole resigns the game once HAL indicates a certain path to checkmate; however, the move which HAL suggests Frank might make is not forced. Stanley Kubrick, director of 2001, was an avid chess player.

The game is shown continuously and legibly for several seconds in a single shot. The board positions and moves made are identical with the conclusion of a real game: Roesch–Schlage, Hamburg 1910, which was reported in a 1955 collection of short games by Irving Chernev. Chess writers have therefore attributed the fictional game fragment to the real one, equating the two and suggesting that the former derived from the latter.

== The game ==
According to chess writers, the game depicted in the film is based on a tournament game played between Roesch and Willi Schlage in Hamburg, 1910.

White: A. Roesch Black: W. Schlage Opening: Ruy Lopez, Wormald Variation (ECO C77)

1. e4 e5 2. Nf3 Nc6 3. Bb5 a6 4. Ba4 Nf6 5. Qe2 b5 6. Bb3 Be7 7. c3 0-0 8. 0-0 d5

The opening is a variation of the Ruy Lopez, followed by a pawn sacrifice by Black.

9. exd5 Nxd5 10. Nxe5 Nf4 11. Qe4 Nxe5 12. Qxa8?

At 12.Qxa8?, White commits a blunder by capturing Black's rook using an undefended queen, simultaneously abandoning the defense of his own king. There is widespread agreement among commentators that White's best move at this point is 12.d4!, a move which, if played, would have solidified control of the center, attacked both black knights, and opened up the development of White's queenside flank. Black responded with 12...Qd3!, however, halting the latter.

Position: a8 white queen, f8 black rook, g8 black king, c7 black pawn, e7 black bishop, f7 black pawn, g7 black pawn, h7 black pawn, a6 black pawn, b5 black pawn, e5 black knight, f4 black knight, c3 white pawn, d3 black queen, h3 black bishop, a2 white pawn, b2 white pawn, d2 white pawn, f2 white pawn, g2 white pawn, h2 white pawn, a1 white rook, b1 white knight, c1 white bishop, d1 white bishop, f1 white rook, g1 white king

Position before 14.Qxa6

12... Qd3! 13. Bd1 Bh3! (diagram)

Black capitalizes on White's mistake on move 12. The film shows the game from the position illustrated, with Poole (White) contemplating his 14th move.

14. Qxa6?

Spoken by Poole as "queen takes pawn", White abandons the long diagonal and slips into a forced checkmate. Even after 14.Qb7 c6 15.Qxe7 Bxg2 16.Re1 Nf3+ 17.Bxf3 Qxf3, mate is not far off.

14... Bxg2 15. Re1 Qf3

Threatening 16...Nh3#. After Poole's "rook to king one", HAL says: "I'm sorry Frank, I think you missed it: queen to bishop three, bishop takes queen, knight takes bishop, mate." HAL gave Black's queen move from White's perspective, although in descriptive notation it should be given from Black's perspective as "queen to bishop six". While HAL describes a checkmate in two moves, Poole could forestall mate two extra moves; for example: 16.Qc8 Rxc8 17.h3 Nxh3+ 18.Kh2 Ng4#.

0–1

Poole resigns without questioning HAL's analysis: "Yeah, looks like you're right. I resign."

Position: f8 black rook, g8 black king, c7 black pawn, e7 black bishop, f7 black pawn, g7 black pawn, h7 black pawn, a6 white queen, b5 black pawn, e5 black knight, f4 black knight, c3 white pawn, f3 black queen, a2 white pawn, b2 white pawn, d2 white pawn, f2 white pawn, g2 black bishop, h2 white pawn, a1 white rook, b1 white knight, c1 white bishop, d1 white bishop, e1 white rook, g1 white king

Final position after 15...Qf3

HAL, after Poole's resignation: "Thank you for a very enjoyable game."

Arthur C. Clarke's novelization of 2001 also indicated that the astronauts could pass the time by playing various board games with HAL, though no specific game (whether chess or otherwise) was depicted. Unlike the film, Clarke's treatment stated that HAL won only half of games played.

For relaxation he (Dave Bowman) could always engage Hal in a large number of semimathematical games, including checkers, chess, and polyominoes. If Hal went all out, he could win any one of them; but that would be bad for morale. So he had been programmed to win only fifty percent of the time, and his human partners pretended not to know this.

— 2001, p. 100.

Unlike Kubrick, Clarke had no particular interest in chess and said that if he did, 2001 would not have been made as the two "would have just played chess". Consonant with Clarke's passing mention of polyominoes, a game involving pentominoes was shot and considered for use in the film, but ultimately passed over in favor of the chess game, which Kubrick felt would be more familiar to audiences. Parker Brothers had planned a corresponding board game as a tie-in to the film, which was released as Universe in 1967; the cover art on the box included a still from the unused cut.

== Interpretation ==
Murray Campbell, a member of the team that developed the chess computer Deep Blue, contributed a chapter to a book exploring the scientific and cultural implications of the HAL character. Campbell argued that HAL's style of play was more "human" than that of Deep Blue's, in the sense that HAL (Schlage) chose a "nonoptimal" move at 9...Nxd5, which nevertheless stymied his human opponent. In contrast, the real computer Deep Blue used "inhuman" brute-force searching and minimax optimization to always seek the best available move. The book's publication was concurrent with Deep Blue's two matches against the Russian grandmaster Garry Kasparov in 1996 and 1997; the human player won the first match, while the computer won the latter.

Tim Krabbé criticized the choice of Roesch–Schlage by way of its aesthetics, calling it "a plain game"; he likewise suggested that the choice of the game implicated Kubrick's own acumen as a player, as well as that of its fictional characters. According to Krabbé, the aesthetic consideration and the simple endgame variation announced by HAL (but not actually played) might explain the character's misuse of descriptive notation when announcing the queen's movement: "A player who would be impressed by that Queen's sacrifice, might be weak enough to make a mistake in its descriptive notation."

== See also ==
- Blade Runner
- Computer chess
- List of chess games
- The Seventh Seal
- The Thing (1982 film)
