= Sammi Fajarowicz =

German chess player

Sammi Fajarowicz (5 June 1908 in Möckern/Leipzig – 4 July 1940 in Leipzig) was a German chess master.

Fajarowicz was born into a Jewish family with Ukrainian roots. He played several times in Leipzig championships; took 3rd in 1928, 2nd in 1929, shared 1st with Max Blümich, but lost to him a play-off match (2.5–4.5) in 1930, and twice won in 1931 and 1933. He also took 5th at Bautzen 1929, tied for 12-13th at Zwickau 1930 (Karl Helling won), and took 5th at Frankfurt.

Fajarowicz took 4th at Great Yarmouth 1935 (Samuel Reshevsky won). In Nazi Germany, he could play only in Jüdische Meisterschaft Deutschlands. He won twice those tournaments – in Leipzig 1935 (jointly with J. Mundsztuk and Simon Rotenstein) and Frankfurt am Main 1937.

He had tried to escape from Germany but without success. He died in a Jewish Hospital in Leipzig (Leipziger Israelisches Krankenhaus) in 1940 from tuberculosis.

The Fajarowicz Gambit in the Budapest Gambit (1.d4 Nf6 2.c4 e5 3.dxe5 Ne4!?) is named after him.

== Literature ==
- Alfred Diel: Fremdenpass Nr. 16. Das kurze Leben des Sächsischen Meisters Sammi Fajarowicz, in: Kaissiber 16/Januar-März 2001, pp. 20–39. (in German)
- Alfred Diel/Stefan Bücker: Spurenlese: Sammi Fajarowicz, in: Kaissiber 16/Januar-März 2001, pp. 41–57. (in German)
- Fajarowicz gambit by Dany Sénéchaud on Mieux jouer aux échecs (in French)
- Gutman, Lev (2004). Budapest Fajarowicz: The Fajarowicz-Richter Gambit in Action. Batsford. ISBN 0-7134-8708-9.
