= Heinz Lehmann (chess player) =

German chess player (1921–1995)

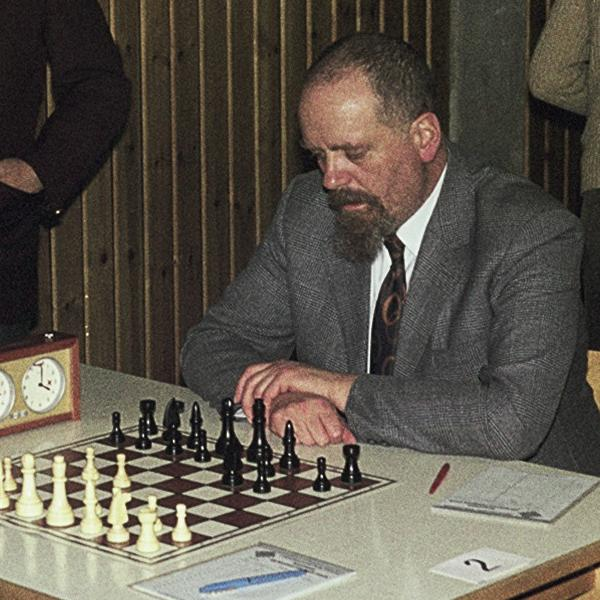
- Lehmann in 1973

Personal information
- Full name: Heinz Gerhard Lehmann
- Born: 20 October 1921 Königsberg
- Died: 8 June 1995 (aged 73) Berlin

Chess career
- Country: Germany
- Title: Grandmaster

Heinz Gerhard Lehmann (20 October 1921, Königsberg – 8 June 1995, Berlin) was a German chess master and 1956 West Berlin Chess Champion.

== Biography ==
Lehmann was born in Königsberg in 1921, studied law. As a chess player, he received FIDE title, International Master (IM) in 1961. He won 1956 Berlin City Chess Championship and 1976 European Chess Club Cup. He was a national player in the 1950s and 1960s, took part in the 13th and 14th Chess Olympiad. He played for West Germany in the 1957 European Chess Championship, and won the individual bronze medal for his board.

At the 1965 Capablanca Memorial Tournament, he played against Bobby Fischer in the first round, lost in 32 moves.

Lehmann became an Honorary Grandmaster (GM) in 1992. He died on 8 June 1995 in Berlin.

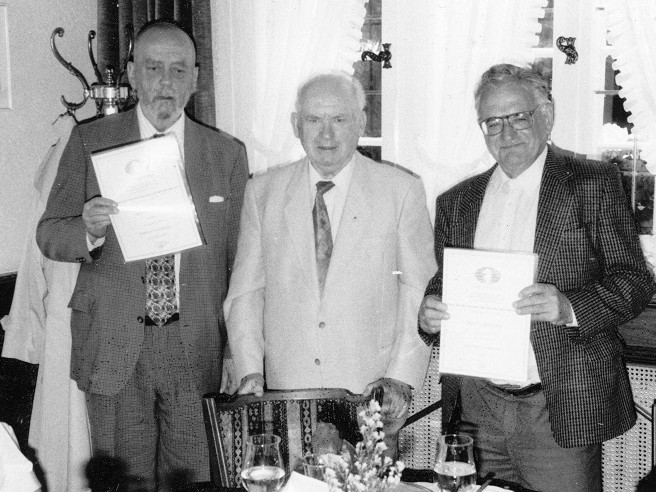
Lehmann (left) became an Honorary Grandmaster in 1992

=== Achievements ===
- 1956 – Berlin City Chess Championship – Champion
- 1957 – European Team Chess Championship – Bronze (individual)
- 1957 – Bad Neueunahr – 3rd
- 1958 – Malta Open – 1st
- 1958 – San Benedetto del Tronto 7th Festival – 2-3rd
- 1962 – Reggio Emilia – 2nd
- 1968 – OLOT, Spain – 1st
- 1968 – Stary Smokovec 17th High Tatra Cup – 1st
- 1976 – European Chess Club Cup - 1st (team)
