= Wolfram Bialas =

German chess player (1935–1998)

Personal information
- Born: 25 August 1935
- Died: 2 January 1998 (aged 62)

Chess career
- Country: Germany
- Title: FIDE Master (1983)
- Peak rating: 2370 (July 1989)

Wolfram Bialas (25 August 1935 — 2 January 1998) was a German chess FIDE master and Chess Olympiad team bronze medal winner (1964).

== Biography ==
Wolfram Bialas twice won the West Berlin City Chess Championship (1958, 1962). He played for chess clubs that won the Chess Bundesliga three times: in 1957 for Berliner Schachgesellschaft Eckbauer, in 1961 for Berliner SG 1827 Eckbauer and in 1978 for Königsspringer Frankfurt.

Wolfram Bialas played for West Germany in the Chess Olympiads:

- in 1960, at the reserve board in the 14th Chess Olympiad in Leipzig (+2, =5, -4),
- in 1964, at the second reserve board in the 16th Chess Olympiad in Tel Aviv (+1, =7, -1), winning a team bronze medal.

Wolfram Bialas played for West Germany in the European Team Chess Championship preliminaries:

- in 1957, at the seventh board in the 1st European Team Chess Championship preliminaries (+2, =2, -0),
- in 1961, at the eighth board in the 2nd European Team Chess Championship preliminaries (+2, =1, -0),
- in 1965, at the third board in the 3rd European Team Chess Championship preliminaries (+2, =1, -1).

Wolfram Bialas played for West Germany in the Clare Benedict Chess Cups:

- in 1960, at the reserve board in the 7th Clare Benedict Chess Cup in Biel (+0, =1, -2), winning a team silver medal,
- in 1961, at the fourth board in the 8th Clare Benedict Chess Cup in Neuhausen (+1, =1, -2), winning team and individual gold medals.
