= Ilja Brener =

Russian-German chess player

Personal information
- Born: September 28, 1989 (age 36) Moscow, Soviet Union

Chess career
- Country: Germany
- Title: International Master (2007)
- FIDE rating: 2406 (July 2026)
- Peak rating: 2423 (April 2008)

Ilja Brener (born 28 September 1989) is a Russian-born German chess player. Since May 2007 he has been identified as an International Master by the World Chess Federation, having first broken through the necessary Elo ratings threshold of 2400 points at a tournament in Prague in May 2004.

== Life ==
Ilja Brener was born in Moscow. When he was three his family relocated to Berlin. Chess was part of family life. However, by the time he was five years old he was routinely outplaying his grandfather, which indicated an unusual talent for the game. He joined his first chess club two years later, in 2007. His coaches included Holger Borchers, International Master Jakob Meister and Grandmaster Sergey Kalinitschew.

== Successes ==
On 23 November, in Graz, he won the first Youth Championship of the European Union in the under-14 category. In July 2004 he won with the German under-18 team the European Championship in Belgrade, receiving a gold medal for his 3.5 out of 5 result from the first reserve board. In April 2005 he was the German under-18 internet-champion. At the July 2006 European Championship in Balatonlelle Brener was the third member of the German National Team. He received a silver medal for his 4.5 out of 6 result from the fourth board. He took part as a member of the German National Team in the Mitropapokal Cup three times, in 2005, 2006 and 2007, when the team won a bronze medal at Szeged. He was a member of the C-cadre of the German National Team.

As a teenager/young player Brener played in six Berlin clubs, most recently with "Schach Verein 'Glück Auf' Rüdersdorf" in the 2. Schachbundesliga (Chess League 2 North). In 2007/2008 he played in the German Chess League with Zehlendorf Chess Club. Since 2013/14 he has played for TuS Makkabi Berlin, for whom at the start of 2018, International Master Brener was the most highly rated of the active players.

Since Brener achieved the necessary Elo rating of 2400 points in Prague in May 2004 to become an International Master his highest rating, achieved in April 2008, was 2423. More recently, in April 2018, it was down to 2401.
