= Rudolf Palme =

Austrian chess player

Rudolf Palme (6 March 1910, Vienna – 1 January 2005, Reutte) was an Austrian chess master.

He took 14th at Vienna 1933 (the 16th Trebitsch Memorial, Ernst Grünfeld and Hans Müller won), and represented Austria in 3rd unofficial Chess Olympiad at Munich 1936 (+7 –5 =4, on 7th board).

In 1937, he came to Berlin, and lived for ten years there. He won the Berlin Championship 1940; won I group in the Berlin-ch and lost a match for the title to Ludwig Rellstab in 1941; tied for 5-7th at Bad Oeynhausen 1941 (the 8th German Championship, Paul Felix Schmidt and Klaus Junge won). tied for 2nd-3rd, behind Junge, at Bad Elster 1941; and tied for 2nd-4th at Vienna 1944 (Orienter won).

After World War II, he took 2nd, behind Wolfgang Unzicker, at Augsburg 1946. Then, he settled in Reutte in Tirol, Austria, in 1947. He tied for 13-15th at Bad Gastein 1948 (Erik Lundin won), won the Austrian Championship at Melk 1950, and tied for 2nd-4th in the AUT-ch 1975.
