= Boris Kogan =

Russian-born American chess player

Boris Markovich Kogan (Hebrew: בוריס קוגן; February 8, 1940 – December 25, 1993) was a Ukrainian-American chess master.

Kogan was the Soviet Junior Champion in 1956 and 1957. He was a full-time chess teacher in the Soviet Union before emigrating and coming to the United States in 1980. In 1981 he was also awarded the International Master title.

He played in the U.S. Chess Championship three times. He was Georgia state champion seven years in a row (1980–1986) and won it a total of nine times (additional wins in 1988 and 1992). He died of colon cancer in 1993.
