= Vincent Rabiega =

German-born Polish footballer

Personal information
- Date of birth: 14 June 1995 (age 31)
- Place of birth: Berlin, Germany
- Height: 1.82 m (5 ft 11 1/2 in)
- Position: Forward

Youth career
- BFC Preussen
- 2010–2013: Hertha BSC

Senior career*
Years	Team	Apps	(Gls)
2013–2016	RB Leipzig II	33	(6)
2016–2017	Bradford City	1	(0)
2017–2019	BFC Dynamo	44	(3)
2019–2021	Tennis Borussia Berlin	16	(12)
2021–2022	BFC Preussen	1	(0)

International career
2012	Poland U17	10	(3)
2012	Poland U18	2	(1)
2014	Poland U19	3	(0)
2015	Poland U20	3	(0)
- * Club domestic league appearances and goals as of 22:13, 15 June 2024 (UTC)

Vincent Rabiega (born 14 June 1995) is a professional footballer who plays as a forward.

Born in Germany, he represented Poland at youth international level. He has played club football in Germany and England for BFC Preussen, Hertha BSC, RB Leipzig II and Bradford City.

== Club career ==
Born in Berlin, Rabiega spent his early career in Germany with BFC Preussen, Hertha BSC and RB Leipzig II. Following a trial with the club, he signed a one-year contract with English club Bradford City in August 2016. He made his debut for them on 27 August 2016, in a 1–1 home draw in the league against Oldham Athletic. He left the club by mutual consent and moved to the Berliner FC Dynamo in January 2017.

== International career ==
Rabiega has represented Poland at youth international level, scoring three goals in 10 games in 2012 for the under-17 team. He also played for them at under-19 and under-20 level.

== Family ==
His father is chess grandmaster Robert Rabiega.
