= Jacob Rosenthal =

American chess player (1881–1954)

Jacob Carl Rosenthal (12 October 1881 in Białystok – 23 October 1954 in New York City) was an American chess master.

== Early life and education ==
Born in Białystok, Poland (then Russian Empire), he became a citizen of the Netherlands. Finally, he emigrated to the United States. He lived and participated in several local chess matches in New York City (Manhattan CC vs. Franklin CC in 1909, 1910, 1911, 1912, and twice Rice CC vs. Brooklyn CC in 1909). He also played in a cable match New York vs. Buenos Aires in 1922.

== Career ==
In tournaments, he won at Manhattan CC championship 1911, won New York State-ch in 1912, took 6th at New York 1916 (Rice Memorial, preliminary, José Raúl Capablanca won), took 3rd, behind Charles Jaffe and Boris Kostić, at New York 1918 (rapid tournament), and took 3rd at New York 1921 (Morris Schapiro won).
