= Hans-Joachim Hecht =

German chess grandmaster (born 1939)

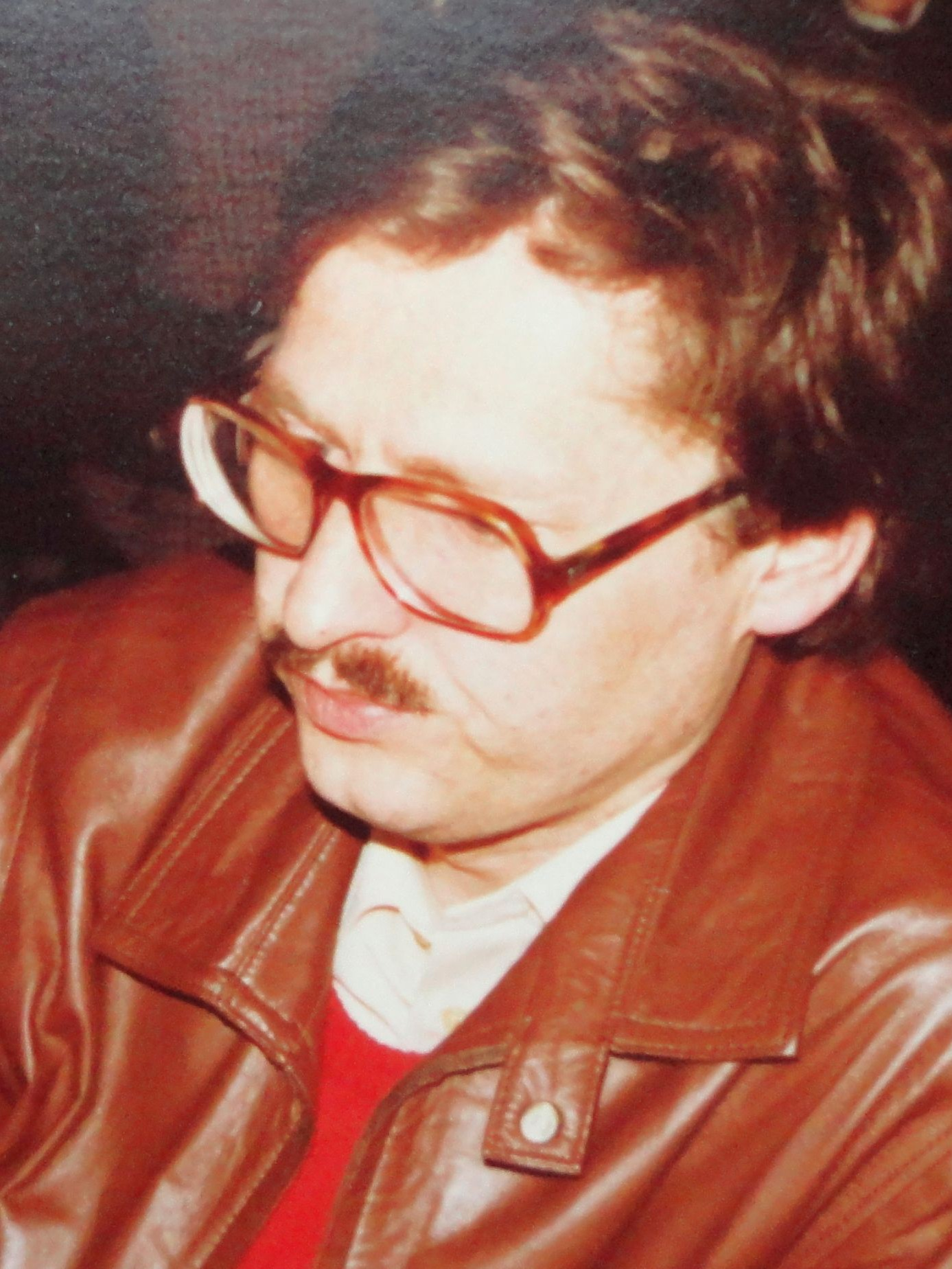
- Hecht in Valletta 1980

Personal information
- Born: January 29, 1939 (age 87) Luckenwalde, Germany

Chess career
- Country: West Germany; Germany
- Title: Grandmaster (1973), International Correspondence Chess Master (1980)
- FIDE rating: 2299 (February 2023)
- Peak rating: 2515 (January 1974)
- Peak ranking: No. 66 (May 1974)

Hans-Joachim Hecht (born January 29, 1939, Luckenwalde, Brandenburg) is a German chess player and twice the West German national champion. His first name is often abbreviated to Hajo.

== Biography ==
One of his earliest international tournaments was the Kecskemét zonal qualifier of 1964, where he finished a creditable ninth equal, behind some of the finest players of the day (Georgi Tringov, Ludek Pachman, László Szabó, Florin Gheorghiu and Vlastimil Hort to name a few). At Bussum in 1968, he took a share of sixth place (Robert Hübner won). There were other promising results at Bussum 1969 and the Raach zonal the same year, but it was apparent that development was slow during this phase of his career, and he was unable to challenge for first place in strong competition.

Progress was eventually forthcoming between earning his International Master title in 1969 and becoming a Grandmaster in 1973, when the quality of his play improved rapidly, and this was largely due to his decision to turn professional around 1970. As a result, he participated in a great many events and was able to register impressive victories at Bad Pyrmont 1970 (with Alexander Matanovic and Mato Damjanovic), Olot 1971, Málaga 1972, Montilla-Moriles 1972 and Dortmund 1973 (with Boris Spassky and Ulf Andersson). Domestically too, he twice captured the German Chess Championship, in 1970 and 1973. At Wijk aan Zee in 1974, a fully bearded Hecht took a share of third place behind Walter Browne and Jan Hein Donner (ahead of Jan Timman and Andras Adorjan) and was the winner at Dublin.

He was also making wedding plans in 1974 and realised that his earnings would be insufficient to raise a family. Consequently, he resumed his former amateur status and took a job in local government, based in Solingen. He married Anne Marie Zeitler, the sister of notable German blind chess player Hans Zeitler and together they had two sons, Christopher and Volkmar. Both are strong chess players.

Hecht has had a long and successful association with team chess, spanning from 1962 to 1986, during which time he made ten Chess Olympiad appearances. Curiously, his highest team position (board 2) at Valletta 1980, coincided with his best score of +7, =4, -2 (69%). He also played at three European Team Chess Championships, from 1965 to 1977, but it was at the World Team Chess Championship of 1985, that he scored his biggest triumph, taking an individual gold medal for his performance on board 5. Over the years, he also gained medals at the EEC Team Chess Championship, The Clare Benedict Chess Cup, and the Nordic Chess Cup. In league chess, he enjoyed many successes with Chess Bundesliga teams Solingen SG 1868 and Bayern Munich throughout his career.

By the late 1970s, he found himself playing a diminishing number of tournaments and so took up correspondence chess, earning himself the Correspondence International Master title in 1980.

For many years, he was a 'second' to World Chess Championship Candidate Robert Hübner.

Most recently, he has been involved in the promotion of German junior chess club Furstenfeldbruck, but also participated at the 2005 World Senior Chess Championship at Lignano Sabbiadoro, where he made a respectable top ten finish from a field of one hundred and forty. In 2006, he played at Queenstown, New Zealand, and took home the 'Seniors' trophy. As of the October 2023 FIDE rating list, Hecht is the only active Grandmaster born in the 1930s.

== Notable games ==
- Hans-Joachim Hecht vs Raymond Keene, Brunnen 1966, Caro-Kann Defense: Karpov, Smyslov Variation (B17), 1-0
- Bent Larsen vs Hans-Joachim Hecht, Buesum 1969, Nimzo-Larsen Attack: English Variation (A01), ½–½
- Hans-Joachim Hecht vs Heinz Schaufelberger, Bath 1973, Sicilian Defense: Najdorf Variation (B95), 1-0
- Hans-Joachim Hecht vs Gyozo V Forintos, Hoogovens 1974, Sicilian Defense: Nezhmetdinov-Rossolimo Attack (B30), 1-0
