= Achilles Frydman =

Polish chess player

Achilles Frydman (March 19, 1904, Łódź – 1940) was a Polish chess player.

== Biography ==
He lived in Łódź where he took 4th place (1930, 1931, 1934) and tied for 5-6th (1933) in the city championships. In 1935, he took 5th in Warsaw at the 3rd Polish Chess Championship, an event won by Savielly Tartakower. The same year, he took 7th in Łódź (Tartakower was the victor once more). He was himself the winner at Łódź in 1936 and a year later, he retired from the 4th Polish Championship, held in Jurata, due to illness.

During the latter stages of his life, he had a history of mental illness, which manifested itself in loud behaviour. He was even reported to have turned up in public, wearing little or no clothing. After a spell in an asylum, doctors warned him against playing any more chess.

In 1940, Frydman was arrested by the Nazis in Warsaw, and died in a concentration camp.

== Notable chess games ==
- Alexander Alekhine vs Achilles Frydman, Lodz 1928, Queen's Indian Defense, Capablanca Variation, E16, 1/2-1/2
- Achilles Frydman vs Stanisław Zawadzki, Warsaw 1935, 3rd POL-ch, Four Knights Game, Spanish, Classical Variation, C48, 1-0
- Achilles Frydman vs Jan Foltys, Jurata 1937, 4th POL-ch, Budapest Gambit, A52, 1/2-1/2
