= Horatio Caro =

British chess player

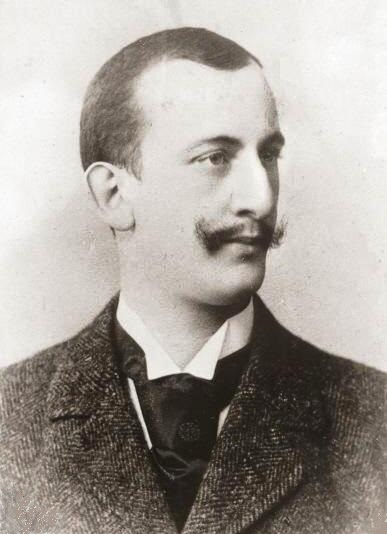
Horatio Caro (1862–1920)

Horatio Caro (5 July 1862 – 15 December 1920) was an English-German chess player, of world-class Master strength for about a decade, from the late 1880s to the late 1890s, a frequent winner of significant German events. He was a regular competitor for 30 years in Master events. Caro is principally known as the co-inventor of the Caro–Kann Defence, a heretofore virtually unknown opening variation, which he analyzed, published, and played from the mid 1880s.

Caro was born in Newcastle upon Tyne, England, but spent most of his chess career in Berlin, Germany, having moved there when he was two years old.

== Matches ==
He played several matches. In 1892, he drew with Curt von Bardeleben (+2 –2 =0) and lost to Szymon Winawer (+2 –3 =1). In 1897, he was defeated by Jacques Mieses (+3 –4 =3). In 1903, he drew with Bardeleben (+4 –4 =0). In 1905, he won against Moritz Lewitt (+4 –3 =5).

== Tournaments ==
In tournaments, he won in Berlin in 1888, 1891, 1894, 1898 (jointly), and 1903. He also took 10th at Berlin 1883, took 4th at Berlin 1887, tied for 2nd-3rd at Nuremberg 1888, took 3rd at Berlin 1889, took 2nd at Berlin 1890. He took 3rd at Berlin 1894, took 9th at Berlin 1897, took 17th at Vienna 1898 chess tournament, took 4th at Berlin 1899, tied for 6-7th at Berlin 1902, tied for 11-12th at Coburg 1904, tied for 7-8th at Barmen 1905, took 9th at Berlin 1907, tied for 3-5th at Berlin 1908, and took 4th at Berlin 1911. He won the 1904 Berlin City Championship, half a point ahead of Ossip Bernstein and Rudolf Spielmann.

== Main achievements ==
He is known for the Caro–Kann Defence {ECO (Encyclopaedia of Chess Openings) codes B10-19}, an opening variation which he analysed along with Marcus Kann, and jointly published in the German journal Brüderschaft in 1886. The variation would be developed into a major system through frequent Master play in the 20th century. It gradually became a favorite choice of many world-class players, including four World Champions: Jose Raul Capablanca, Mikhail Botvinnik, Tigran Vartanovich Petrosian, and Anatoly Karpov.

Caro is also known for beating future World Champion Emanuel Lasker at Berlin 1890 in 14 moves only, his shortest-ever tournament game loss. Caro appeared in the 1898 Anglo-American cable chess match.

== World-class retrospective playing strength ==
Ratings for chess were not developed until well into the 20th century, many decades after Caro's peak playing years. American statistician Jeff Sonas, with work presented on his website chessmetrics.com, applied modern rating algorithms to results data from many hundreds of historical events, to produce a retrospective analysis for the playing strength of Masters from earlier eras. Caro's peak event performance was from Berlin 1890, where he scored 5.5/7, good for a 2700 performance rating. Caro's peak rating list standing occurred for six different months, between May 1893 and October 1893, where he ranked #7 in the world, with a 2676 rating. This places him in the world-class category.

== Death ==
Caro died in London age 58. He was discharged from a workhouse in Whitechapel citing his death as the reason.
