= Gerhard Pfeiffer =

German chess player

Gerhard Pfeiffer (June 14, 1923 – June 27, 2000) was a German chess master and chess problemist.

He tied for 5-7th at Bad Oeynhausen 1941 (8th German Chess Championship, Paul Felix Schmidt and Klaus Junge won); shared 1st with Lothar Schmid at Wiessenfels 1947 (Soviet Zone-ch); shared 10th at Bad Pyrmont 1949 (West Germany-ch, Efim Bogoljubow won); took 2nd, behind Rudolf Teschner, at Düsseldorf 1951 (GER-ch); and took 5th at Sofia 1957 (zonal, Miroslav Filip won).

Pfeiffer won six times for West Germany in Chess Olympiads (1950-1960), and won two bronze medals (team and individual) in the 9th Chess Olympiad at Dubrovnik 1950.

He was awarded the International Master title in 1957.
