= Robert Rabiega =

German chess grandmaster (born 1971)

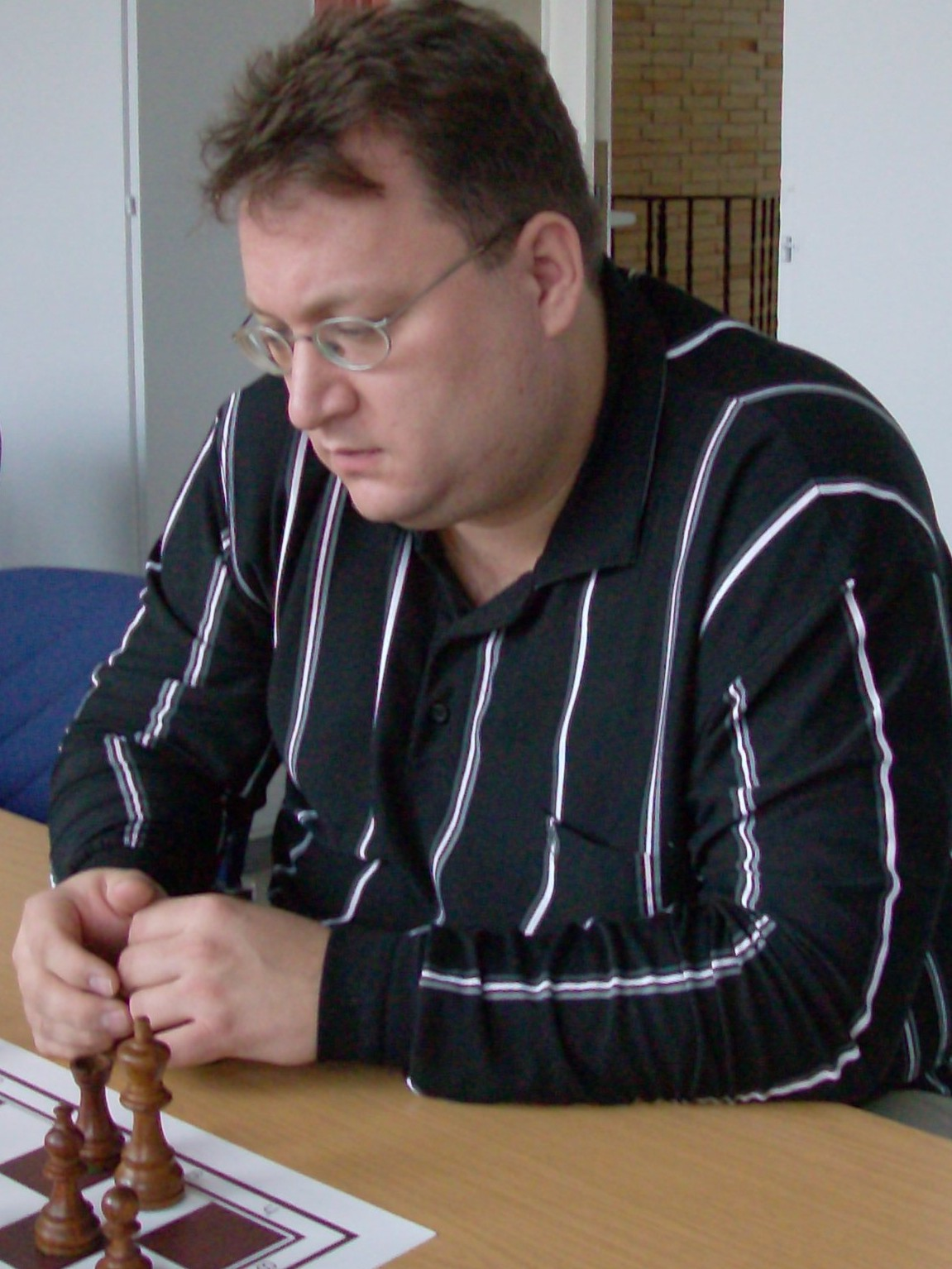
- Robert Rabiega in 2010

Personal information
- Born: 1 February 1971 (age 55) Berlin, Germany

Chess career
- Country: Germany
- Title: Grandmaster (2002)
- FIDE rating: 2460 (July 2026)
- Peak rating: 2560 (April 2008)

Robert Rabiega (born 1 February 1971) is a German chess Grandmaster (GM, 2002) who won German Chess Championship (2000).

== Biography ==
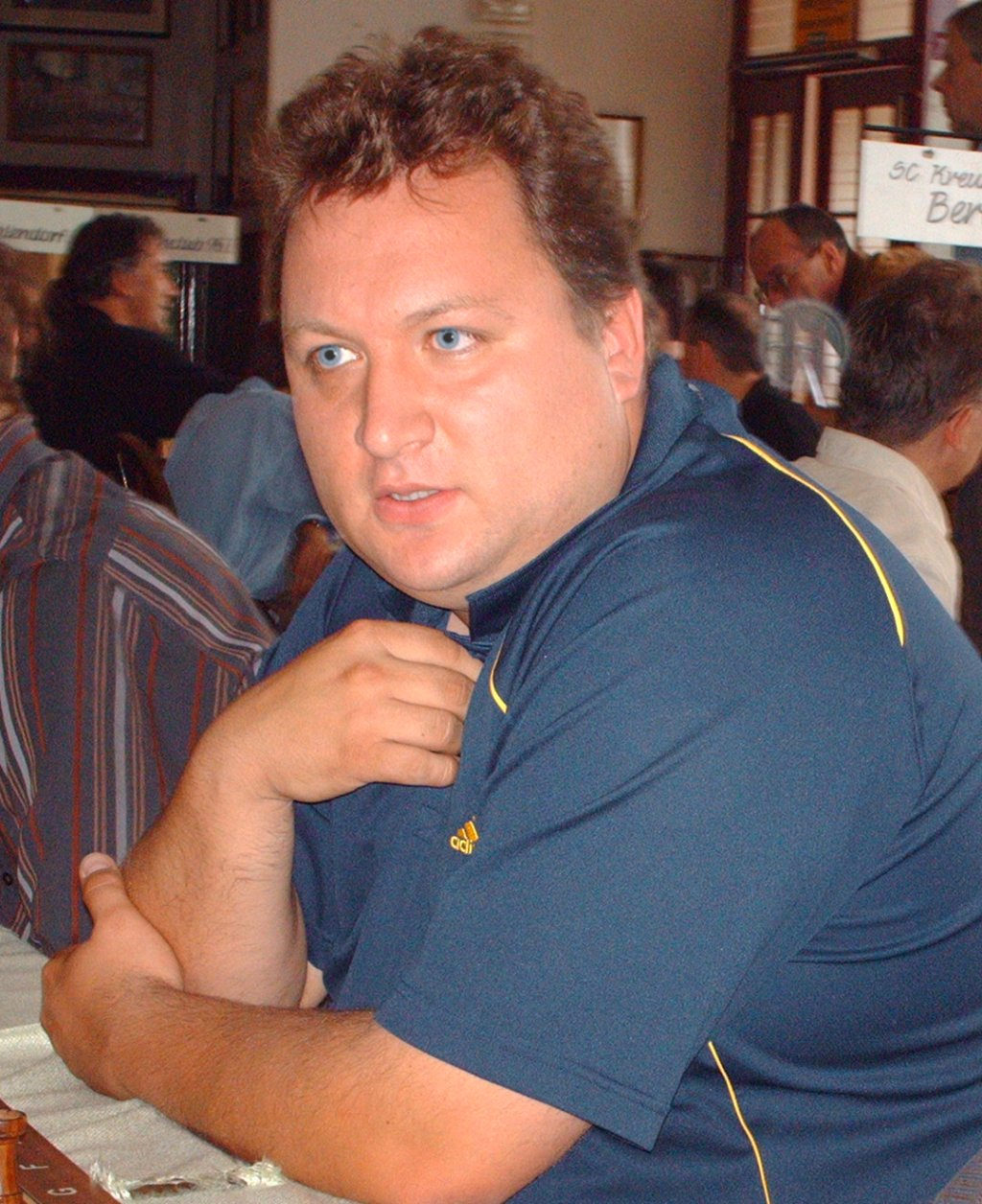
Robert Rabiega in 2007 in Forst (Lausitz)

In 1987 Robert Rabiega represented the West Germany at the World Youth Chess Championship in U18 age group that were held in Innsbruck. In 1991 he won in Berlin, in 1993 he took 2nd place in the Open chess tournament in Dresden and triumphed in Poznań. A year later in the next Poznań tournament he shared 2nd place with Paweł Blehm. In 1996 Robert Rabiega achieved his first success at the German Chess Championship with his 6th place in Dudweiler. The following year he won the Spree-Open and the round-robin tournament in Budapest (together with József Horváth), he also won the Berlin City Chess Championship.

In 2000 Robert Rabiega triumphed again at the Berlin City Chess Championship and achieved the greatest success of his career when he won the gold medal at the German Chess Championship in Heringsdorf. In 2002 he took second place (behind Arkadij Naiditsch) at the B-Tournament in Essen, in 2004 he came 6th at the 75. German Individual Chess Championship in Höckendorf and won the Berliner Open. In the same year he performed in Barlinek at the Emanuel Lasker-Memorial where he (together with Bartłomiej Heberla) took 2nd place. In 2005 he won the Lichtenrader Herbst in Berlin, and repeated this success a year later. In 2007 he shared first place with Imre Héra, Radosław Jedynak, Ilia Balinov and Grzegorz Gajewski at the tournament in Oberwart and won the 14. Open Graz. In May 2008 he won the Unicorn-Open in Berlin with 6 out of 7 possible points.

Robert Rabiega is one of the best German players in a fast chess: four times (2002, 2003, 2008 and 2014) he won German Blitz Chess Championships and three times (1998-2000) German Rapid Chess Championships.

He plays for the SK König Tegel, which he led to the German Team Championship in blitz chess in 2014 and for which he 1990/91, 2000/01, 2006/07, 2009/10, 2011/12, 2013/14 and 2016/17 in the German Chess Bundesliga (with two exceptions each on the top board), as well as in Austria since 2011 for Straßenbahn Graz . Before that he played for ESV Austria Graz, with which he was represented from 1995 to 2005 in the Staatsliga A (from 2003 1st Austrian Chess Bundesliga) and in 2003 became Austrian Team Chess champion. From 1986 to 1988 he played for SVg Lasker-Steglitz, from 1993 to 1995 for SV Empor Berlin in the 1st Chess Bundesliga.

In February 2015 he was in 45th place in the German chess player rankings.

As a trainer, Robert Rabiega is committed to talented young players and to school chess. Since September 2012 he has been a chess teacher at the Käthe-Kollwitz-Gymnasium (Berlin).

He is the father of football player Vincent Rabiega.
