= Wilhelm Cohn =

German chess player

Wilhelm Cohn (Hebrew: וילהלם קוהן, February 6, 1859, Berlin – August 17, 1913, Charlottenburg) was a German chess master.

He participated in some strong tournaments. In 1897, he tied for 13-14th in Berlin (Rudolf Charousek won). In 1898, he tied for 2nd-4th in Cologne (11th DSB Kongress; Amos Burn won). In 1899, he tied for 10-11th in London (Emanuel Lasker won). In 1900, he took 6th in Munich (12th DSB Kongress; Géza Maróczy, Harry Pillsbury and Carl Schlechter won). In 1902, he took 13th in Hanover (13th DSB Kongress; Dawid Janowski won).

He won several B tournaments at Berlin 1893, Leipzig 1894, Hastings 1895, Eisenach 1896, Berlin 1908, and took 3rd at Barmen 1905. He tied for 2nd-3rd, behind Carl Ahues, at Berlin 1911.

In matches, he lost both to Carl Walbrodt in 1894, and Erhardt Post in 1910.

== See also ==
- List of Jewish chess players
