= Berthold Koch =

German chess player (1899–1988)

Personal information
- Born: 22 February 1899 Berlin, Germany
- Died: 2 May 1988 (aged 89)

Chess career
- Country: Germany
- Title: International Correspondence Chess Master (1959)

Berthold Koch (22 February 1899 – 2 May 1988) was a German chess master and journalist.

== Early life ==
Koch was born in Berlin on 22 February 1899.

== Chess career ==
Koch won four times the Berlin Championship in 1927, 1933 (joint), 1946, and 1951. He also won the Soviet zone-ch at Leipzig 1946 and twice (joint) GDR Championship in 1952 and 1953.

Before World War II, he played in German championships at Bad Pyrmont 1933 (Efim Bogoljubow won), at Bad Aachen 1935 (Kurt Richter won), and at Bad Oeynhausen 1938 (Erich Eliskases won). After the war, he shared 11th at Düsseldorf 1951 (GER-ch, Rudolf Teschner won), and took 3rd at Leipzig 1953 (GER-ch, Wolfgang Unzicker won).

Koch played twice for GDR in Chess Olympiads at Helsinki 1952 and Moscow 1956.

He was awarded the International Master title in 1950, and the ICCF title in 1959.
