= Klaus Darga =

German chess grandmaster (born 1934)

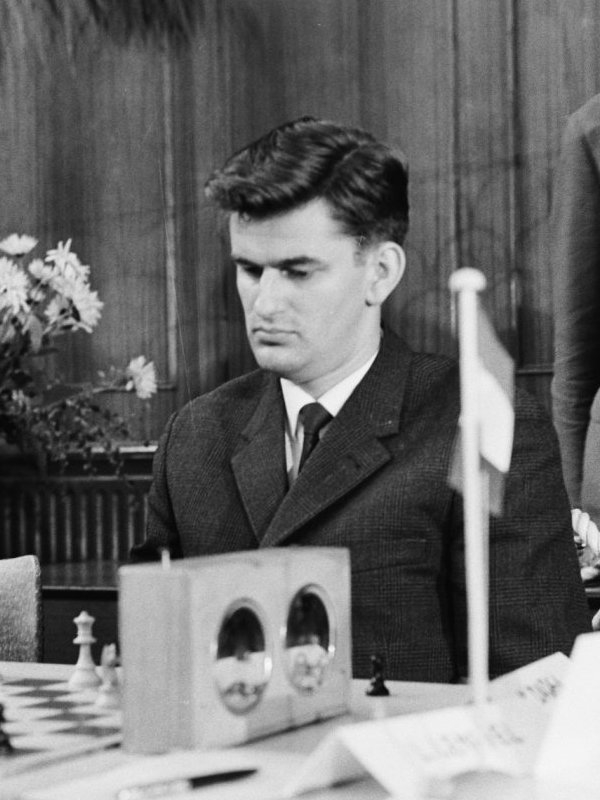
- Darga in 1963

Personal information
- Born: Klaus Viktor Darga; 24 February 1934 (age 92) Berlin, Germany

Chess career
- Country: Germany
- Title: Grandmaster (1964)
- FIDE rating: 2453 (October 2026)
- Peak rating: 2540 (July 1971)
- Peak ranking: No. 39 (July 1971)

Klaus Viktor Darga (born 24 February 1934) is a German chess grandmaster.

== Chess career ==
In 1951, Darga became German Junior Champion after winning the national under-20 championship. He also proved his strength as a young chess player by sharing first place in the World Junior Championship of 1953, with Oscar Panno of Argentina who was awarded the title on tiebreak. He won the West German Chess Championship in 1955 and 1961. He came second in the Gijón international tournament in 1956. His best performance is held to be the 1967 Winnipeg tournament, where he also tied for first place with Bent Larsen, whom he beat, ahead of joint Boris Spassky and Paul Keres.

He was awarded the title of International Master in 1957, and Grandmaster in 1964. He played for West Germany in ten Olympiads between 1954 and 1978, and also served as coach of the German national team. He was second reserve for the World team in the 1970 Match of the Century between the Soviet Union and the rest of the world, but did not play any games in the match.

His favourite openings as White were the English Opening and the Ruy Lopez. As Black he often played the Sicilian Defence.

== Notable games ==
Darga vs. Spassky, Amsterdam 1964

Position: d8 black king, d6 white pawn, g6 black pawn, a5 white king, f5 black pawn, g5 white pawn, a4 white bishop, c4 black pawn, f4 white pawn, e2 black bishop

Final position
- Klaus Darga vs Boris Spassky, 1964 Interzonal

== Personal life ==
Darga studied mechanical engineering at the Technical University of Berlin after his Abitur. In the early 1960s he played chess full-time and eventually abandoned his studies. He gave up professional chess in 1964, at the age of 30. Narrowly missing qualification for the Candidates matches at the Amsterdam Interzonal that year was one reason for the decision. He then applied to IBM, which hired him as a programmer and accepted his grandmaster title in place of a degree. He had to promise not to work on chess programs.

From 1989 to 1997 Darga was national coach of the German Chess Federation, succeeding Sergiu Samarian. IBM kept paying his salary during this period under a company programme that released staff for non-profit work. After his term ended he continued to work on curricula for coach education and led the training courses for A-licence coaches.
