= Wilhelm Ernst =

German chess player (1905–1952)

Wilhelm Ernst (25 August 1905, in Gelsenkirchen – 23 July 1952, in Gelsenkirchen) was a German chess master.

== Biography ==
He was a winner at Weidenau 1937. He played several times in German Chess Championship; took second, behind Kurt Richter, at Aachen 1935, took 11th at Bad Oeynhausen 1937 (Georg Kieninger won), took 16th at Bad Oeynhausen 1939 (Erich Eliskases won), tied for 8–11th at Bad Oeynhausen 1941 (Paul Felix Schmidt and Klaus Junge won), tied for 13-14th at Weidenau 1947 (Kieninger won), tied for 12-14th at Essen 1948 (Wolfgang Unzicker won), and shared 11th at Düsseldorf 1951 (Rudolf Teschner won).

Ernst represented Germany in 3rd unofficial Chess Olympiad at Munich 1936, where he won team bronze medal and individual silver medal on first reserve board. In 1940, he lost a match to Kieninger (4 : 6) in Cologne.
