= Ludwig Rödl =

German chess player (1907–1970)

Ludwig Roedl (Rödl) (30 April 1907 in Nuremberg – 23 March 1970 in Nuremberg) was a German chess master.

In 1927, Roedl twice tied for 1st-2nd in Bamberg and Munich. In 1928, he tied for 7-8th in Kissingen (B tourn, L. Schmitt won). In 1929, he tied for 1st-3rd in Duisburg (26th DSB–Congress, B tourn). In 1930, he tied for 1st-2nd in Bamberg.

Roedl won a match against Ludwig Engels (5.5 : 2.5) at Nuremberg – Düsseldorf 1930. He won (jointly with Efim Bogoljubov) at Swinemünde 1931 (27th DSB–Congress). He took 2nd at Swinemünde 1932 (Gösta Stoltz won). In 1933, he took 2nd in Bad Pyrmont (1st GER-ch, Bogoljubow won), and 11th place in Bad Aachen (Bogoljubow won). In 1934, he took 3rd in Bad Aachen (2nd GER-ch, Carl Carls won). In 1935, he tied for 8-9th in Bad Nauheim (Bogoljubow won). In 1936, he tied for 6-7th in Dresden (Alexander Alekhine won).

Rödl played for Germany at 7th board (+8 –2 =6) in the 3rd unofficial Chess Olympiad at Munich 1936, winning individual gold and team bronze medals.

He shared first place with Karl Gilg at Bad Elster 1940. After World War II, he lived in West Germany. He took 2nd, behind Bogoljubow, at Lüneburg 1947; won, ahead of Wolfgang Unzicker, at Riedenburg 1947; took 2nd, behind Georg Kieninger, at Weidenau 1947 (11th GER-ch); tied for 3rd-5th at Bad Nauheim 1948 (Unzicker won), and tied for 14-22nd at Bad Pyrmont 1949 (Bogoljubow won).
