= Ossip Bernstein =

Russian and French chess grandmaster (1882–1962)

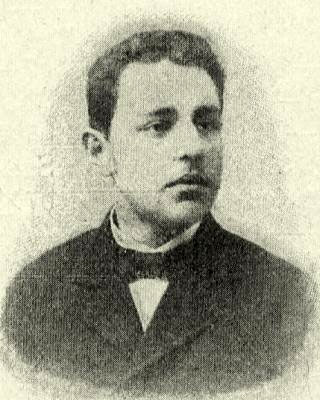
- Bernstein, c. 1902

Personal information
- Born: Ossip Samoilovich Bernstein; 20 September 1882 Zhitomir, Russian Empire
- Died: 30 November 1962 (aged 80) French Pyrenees

Chess career
- Country: Russia; France
- Title: Grandmaster (1950)

Ossip Samoilovich Bernstein (Note: Also transliterated as Osip Samoylovich Bernshteyn.) (Russian: Осип Самойлович Бернштейн; 20 September 1882 – 30 November 1962) was a Russian and French chess player and businessman. He was one of the inaugural recipients of the title of International Grandmaster from FIDE in 1950.

== Biography ==
Born in Zhitomir in the Russian Empire (present-day Ukraine) to a wealthy Jewish family, Bernstein grew up in Russia before earning his doctorate in law at Heidelberg University in 1906. He then became a financial lawyer.

Bernstein was a successful businessman who earned considerable wealth before losing it in the Bolshevik Revolution. He earned a second fortune that was lost in the Great Depression, and a third that was lost when France was invaded by Nazi Germany in 1940. His Jewish origins meant that he could not remain in Nazi-occupied France, and he was forced to flee to Spain and settled in Barcelona.

According to Arnold Denker, who was told by Edward Lasker, a 36-year-old Bernstein in 1918 was arrested in Odessa by the Bolshevik secret police whose purpose was to investigate and punish "counterrevolutionary" crimes. Bernstein was to be shot by a firing squad for serving as a legal advisor to the banking industry.⁣ On the day of his execution, Bernstein watched as the firing squad lined up before him. At the last minute, a commanding officer asked to see the list of prisoner names and recognized Bernstein's name as he was a chess enthusiast. After confronting Bernstein about his identity, the commanding officer offered him a deal he couldn't refuse.⁣ They would play a game of chess. If Bernstein won the match, he would win his life and freedom. However, if he drew or lost, he would get shot along with the rest of the prisoners. Bernstein won in short order and was released. He escaped on a British ship and settled in Paris.

Bernstein died in a sanatorium in the French Pyrenees in 1962.

== Chess career ==
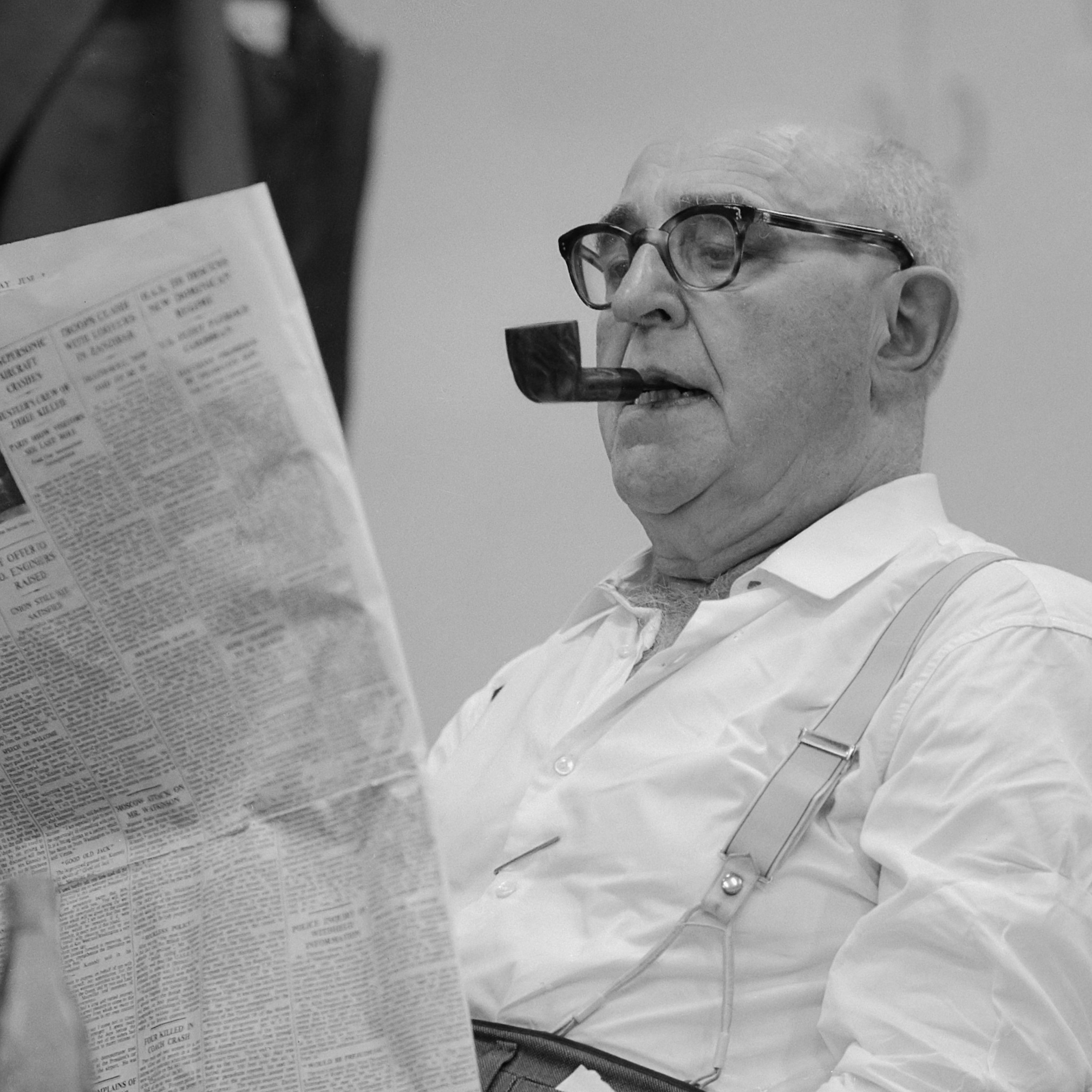
Bernstein, 1961.

In June 1902, Bernstein won at Berlin. In July–August 1902, he took 2nd, behind Walter John, at Hannover (the 13th DSB Congress, Hauptturnier A). In 1902/03, he won at Berlin. In September 1903, he took 2nd, behind Mikhail Chigorin, in the Kiev 1903 chess tournament (the 3rd All-Russian Masters' Tournament). In 1903/04, he tied for 2nd–3rd with Rudolf Spielmann, behind Horatio Caro, at Berlin. In July–August 1904, he tied for 4th–5th at Coburg (14th DSB Congress). In August 1905, he tied for 4th–5th at Barmen (Masters A). In 1906, he tied for 1st with Carl Schlechter at Stockholm. In 1906, he tied for 4th–6th at Ostend. In 1907, he tied for 1st with Akiba Rubinstein at Ostend (Masters A). In 1909, he took 5th at Sankt Petersburg. In 1911, he won the Moscow City Championship.

In February–March 1911, he tied for 8th–9th in the San Sebastián chess tournament. His loss to José Raúl Capablanca in this tournament is remembered because Bernstein had complained that the unknown Capablanca had been allowed to participate. Capablanca was awarded the Brilliancy Prize for this game.

In 1912, Bernstein took 2nd, behind Rubinstein, at Vilna (All-Russian ch.). In January 1914, he lost an exhibition mini-match against Capablanca at Moscow (+0−1=1). In April–May 1914, he tied for 6th–7th with Rubinstein in the St. Petersburg 1914 chess tournament (Preliminaries).

In 1922, he lost a mini-match against Alexander Alekhine in Paris (+0−1=1). In 1930, he took 2nd, behind Hans Johner, at Le Pont. In July 1932, he tied for 5th–6th with Efim Bogoljubov in Bern. In 1932, he beat Oskar Naegeli (+3−1=0) in Zurich. In 1933, he drew a training match against reigning World Chess Champion Alexander Alekhine in Paris (+1−1=2). In 1934, he tied for 6th–7th with Aron Nimzowitsch in Zürich (Alekhine won). In 1938, he drew a match with Oldřich Duras in Prague (+1−1=1).

During World War II, he played friendly games with Alekhine and others in Paris in Spring 1940.

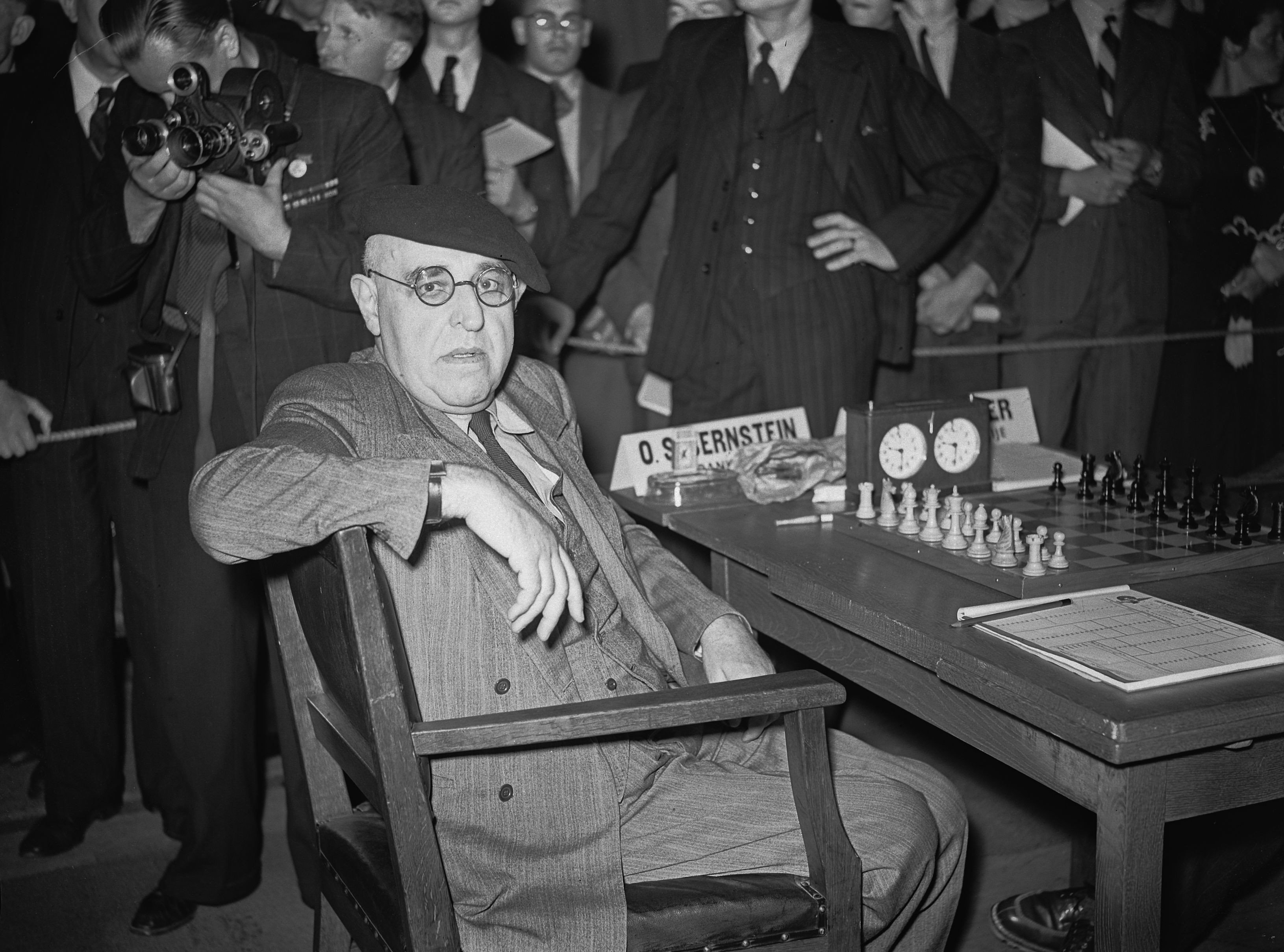
Bernstein, 1946.

After World War II, Bernstein came back to chess. In 1946, he took 2nd, behind Herman Steiner, at London. In 1946, he tied for 15th–16th at Groningen. In June 1946, he won a game against Lajos Steiner at a match Australia vs. France in Australia. In December 1948, he drew a game against Reuben Fine at a cable match New York vs. Paris. In April 1954, he lost two games against David Bronstein at a match France vs. The Soviet Union at Paris. In 1954, he tied for 2nd–3rd with Miguel Najdorf, behind René Letelier, at Montevideo at age 72. Najdorf protested that it was unfair to play such an aged opponent, and then became so confident of victory that he convinced the tournament organizers to double the First Prize money at the expense of reducing the payouts for the lesser prizes, a gamble that backfired in spectacular fashion as the septuagenarian Bernstein routed him in a 37-move Old Indian Defense that won Bernstein the Brilliancy Prize.

Bernstein played at first board for France at the 11th Chess Olympiad in Amsterdam 1954 (+5−5=5). He was a member of the French team, at the 12th Olympiad in Moscow 1956, but he did not play because of illness.

When FIDE introduced official titles in 1950, Bernstein was awarded the International Grandmaster title. He had level or nearly level lifetime scores against such outstanding players as the second World Champion Emanuel Lasker (+2−3=1), Akiba Rubinstein (+1−1=7), Aron Nimzowitsch (+1−2=4), Mikhail Chigorin (+2−1=0) and Salo Flohr (+0−0=3). He had poor records, however, against the third World Champion José Raúl Capablanca (+0−3=1); and the fourth World Champion Alexander Alekhine (+1−8=5).

== Notable games ==
- Bernstein vs. Miguel Najdorf, Montevideo 1954, Old Indian Defense, A55, 1–0. Brilliancy prize.

== See also ==
- List of chess grandmasters
