= Carl Ahues =

German chess player (1883–1968)

Personal information
- Born: Carl Oscar Ahues; December 26, 1883 Bremen, German Empire
- Died: December 31, 1968 Hamburg, West Germany

Chess career
- Country: Germany
- Title: International Master (1950)

Carl Oscar Ahues (26 December 1883, Bremen – 31 December 1968, Hamburg) was a German chess International Master.

== Chess career ==
He was Berlin champion in 1910 and shared 3rd place at the strong Berlin tournament of 1926 (Efim Bogoljubow won). He was German Champion in 1929 winning the 26th DSB Congress in Duisburg. In 1930, he took 6th in San Remo (Alexander Alekhine won), tied for 4–5th in Scarborough (Edgar Colle won), and tied for 3–5th in Liège (Savielly Tartakower won). In 1931, he tied for 2nd-4th in Berlin (Herman Steiner won), and tied for 4–6th in Swinemünde (27th DSB Congress; Efim Bogoljubow and Ludwig Roedl won).

Ahues represented Germany thrice in Chess Olympiads.

- In 1930, at first board in 3rd Chess Olympiad in Hamburg (+4 –3 =7), team bronze;
- In 1931, at second board in 4th Chess Olympiad in Prague (+3 –2 =8);
- In 1936, at second board in 3rd unofficial Chess Olympiad in Munich (+4 –1 =12), team bronze.

In 1933, he took 10th in Bad Pyrmont (1st GER-ch; Bogoljubow won). In 1934, he took 3rd in Bad Niendorf (Gideon Ståhlberg won). In 1935, he took 4th in Bad Aachen (3rd GER-ch; Kurt Richter won). In 1935, he won in Hamburg. In 1935, he tied for 5–6th in Bad Nauheim (Bogoljubow won). In 1936, he took 3rd, behind Alexander Alekhine and Paul Keres, in Bad Nauheim. In 1939, he took 4th in Bad Harzburg (Erich Eliskases won).

In 1940, he tied for 6–9th in Bad Oeynhausen (7th GER-ch; Georg Kieninger won). In 1940, he tied for 5–8th in Kraków/Bad Krynica/Warsaw (1st GG-ch; Anton Kohler and Bogoljubow won). In 1941, he tied for 9–11th in Trentschin-Teplitz (Jan Foltys won). In 1942, he took 10th in Munich (EUR-ch, Wertungsturnier – Qualification Tournament; Gösta Danielsson won). In 1942, he won in Berlin (BSG). In 1944, he tied for 2nd-3rd, behind Elsas, in Luxembourg.

In 1946, he won in Bad Harzburg. In 1947, he tied for 2nd-3rd, behind Ludwig Rellstab, in Stuttgart. In 1953, he tied for 7–9th in Leipzig (GER-ch; Wolfgang Unzicker won).

Awarded the IM title in 1950.

== Personal life ==
After World War II, Ahues lived in West Germany.

His son, Herbert Ahues, was a famous chess composer.
