= Kurt Richter =

German chess player (1900–1969)

Personal information
- Born: Kurt Paul Otto Joseph Richter; 24 November 1900 Berlin, German Empire
- Died: 29 December 1969 (aged 69) East Berlin, East Germany

Chess career
- Country: Germany
- Title: International Master

Kurt Paul Otto Joseph Richter (24 November 1900 – 29 December 1969) was a German chess International Master (IM) and chess writer.

== Chess career ==
In 1922, Richter for the first time won the Berlin City Chess Championship. In 1928, he tied for 1st–2nd in Berlin. In 1928, he won in Wiesbaden. In 1930, he tied for 4–5th in Swinemünde. In 1930, he tied for 3rd–5th in Prague. In 1931, he lost a match to Gösta Stoltz (½:1½) in Berlin. In 1931, he took 2nd, behind Ludwig Rellstab, in Berlin.

He played for Germany at two official and one unofficial Chess Olympiads: at fourth board (+6–3=3) at Hamburg 1930, fourth board (+7–1=7) at Prague 1931, first board (+8–2=8) at Munich 1936. He won two team bronze medals (1930, 1936) and one individual bronze medal (1931).

In 1932, he won in Hamburg. In 1932, he tied for 1st–2nd in Kiel. In 1932, he took 3rd in Berlin. In 1932, he took 4th in Swinemünde. In 1932/33, he tied for 1st–2nd in Berlin. In 1933, he took 2nd, behind Efim Bogoljubow, in Bad Aachen. In 1933, he tied for 5–6th in Swinemünde. In 1933, he tied for 4–5th in Bad Salzbrunn. In 1934, he took 2nd, behind Gideon Ståhlberg, in Bad Niendorf. In 1935, he tied for 1st–2nd in Berlin. In 1935, he took 2nd in Swinemünde. In July 1935, he won in Bad Aachen (3rd GER-ch). In September 1935, he played in Zoppot (GER vs SWE match). In 1936, he won in the Berlin championship. In 1936, he took 2nd in Swinemünde. In 1936, he tied for 8–9th in Poděbrady (Salo Flohr won). In 1937, he tied for 2nd–3rd in Berlin. In 1937, he took 4th in Bad Elster. In 1937, he tied for 1st–2nd in Bad Saarow. In July 1937, he took 2nd, behind Georg Kieninger, in Bad Oeynhausen (4th GER-ch). In 1937, he took 3rd in Berlin (Friedrich Sämisch won). In 1938, he took 9th in Bad Harzburg (Vasja Pirc won). In 1938, he won in the Berlin championship. In 1938, he tied for 4–5th in Berlin. In July 1938, he tied for 5–7th in Bad Oeynhausen (5th GER-ch). The event was won by Erich Eliskases. In May 1939, he took 2nd, behind Bogoljubow, in Stuttgart (1st Europa-Turnier).

During World War II, Richter played in several strong tournaments. In June 1940, he won in Berlin (BSG), and took 2nd, behind Bogoljubow, in Berlin. In August 1940, he tied for 3rd–4th in Bad Oeynhausen (7th GER-ch). In November 1940, he took 3rd in Kraków/Krynica/Warsaw (the 1st GG-ch). In 1941, he tied for 3rd–4th in Berlin. In August 1941, he took 3rd, behind Paul Felix Schmidt and Klaus Junge, in Bad Oeynhausen (8th GER-ch). In September 1941, he tied for 5–6th in Munich (2nd Europa-Turnier). The event was won by Stoltz. In September 1942, he tied for 3rd–5th in Munich (1st European Championship, Europameisterschaft). The event was won by Alexander Alekhine.

After the war, he participated in the Berlin championships. He tied for 1st–2nd (1948), tied for 3rd–4th (1949), tied for 2nd–3rd (1950), took 2nd (1951), took 3rd (1952).

He was awarded the IM title in 1950, the first year in which FIDE offered the IM and GM titles. He was co-editor of Deutsche Schachblätter and Deutsche Schachzeitung. Richter authored several chess books with his books on chess tactics being very popular throughout the 1950s–60s and translated into several languages.

== Legacy ==
Position: a8 black rook, c8 black bishop, d8 black queen, e8 black king, f8 black bishop, h8 black rook, a7 black pawn, b7 black pawn, e7 black pawn, f7 black pawn, g7 black pawn, h7 black pawn, c6 black knight, d6 black pawn, f6 black knight, g5 white bishop, d4 white knight, e4 white pawn, c3 white knight, a2 white pawn, b2 white pawn, c2 white pawn, f2 white pawn, g2 white pawn, h2 white pawn, a1 white rook, d1 white queen, e1 white king, f1 white bishop, h1 white rook

Richter–Rauzer Attack

Position: a8 black rook, b8 black knight, c8 black bishop, d8 black queen, e8 black king, f8 black bishop, h8 black rook, a7 black pawn, b7 black pawn, c7 black pawn, e7 black pawn, f7 black pawn, g7 black pawn, h7 black pawn, f6 black knight, d5 black pawn, g5 white bishop, d4 white pawn, c3 white knight, a2 white pawn, b2 white pawn, c2 white pawn, e2 white pawn, f2 white pawn, g2 white pawn, h2 white pawn, a1 white rook, d1 white queen, e1 white king, f1 white bishop, g1 white knight, h1 white rook

Richter–Veresov Attack

The Richter–Rauzer Attack of the Sicilian Defence (also known as the Richter Attack) occurs after 1.e4 c5 2.Nf3 d6 3.d4 cxd4 4.Nxd4 Nf6 5.Nc3 Nc6 6.Bg5. The line was named in honor of Richter and the Soviet master Vsevolod Rauzer.

The Richter–Veresov Attack (also known as the Veresov Opening, or Richter Attack) was named after Richter and Gavriil Veresov. It most commonly occurs after 1.d4 d5 2.Nc3 Nf6 3.Bg5. After 3...Bf5, Richter continued 4.f3 (the Richter Variation).
