= 1932 in chess =

Events in chess in 1932:

- Canadian Chess Federation (later renamed Chess Federation of Canada) replaces the Canadian Chess Association, and for the first time all major cities in Canada are represented.
- Buchholz system for tie-breaking in tournaments is developed by Bruno Bucholz.

== Tournaments ==
No tournaments in 1932 equal the strength of Bled 1931, but several important contests are held.

- Hastings 1931/2 won by Salo Flohr (Czechoslovakia) scoring 8/9, followed by Isaac Kashdan (United States) with 7½. Further back were Max Euwe (Netherlands) at 5½ and Mir Sultan Khan (India) at 4½.
- London "Sunday Referee" tournament featured five players from Hastings (Flohr, Kashdan, Sultan Khan, Sir George Thomas, and Vera Menchik) with the addition of Alexander Alekhine (France), Savielly Tartakower, and Géza Maróczy. Alekhine won 9/11, followed by Flohr at 8 and Kashdan and Khan tied at 7½.
- Bern featured the most important tournament of the year, with ten Swiss players and six foreign masters. Alekhine won scoring 12½/15, followed by Euwe and Flohr at 11½, Sultan Khan at 11, and Ossip Bernstein and Efim Bogoljubov at 10½.
- Pasadena won by Alekhine 8½/11, followed by Kashdan at 7½, and Arthur Dake, Samuel Reshevsky, and Herman Steiner at 6.
- Mexico City hosts the first international chess tournament held in Mexico. Alekhine and Kashdan share first with 8½/9, followed by Captain José Joaquín Araiza (champion of Mexico and organizer of the tournament) at 6.
- Hungarian Championship won by Géza Maróczy 13/17 ahead of Esteban Canal at 12, Endre Steiner at 11, and Lajos Steiner and Andor Lilienthal tied at 10½.
- British Championship won by Sultan Khan 8½/11, followed by C. H. O'D Alexander, at 8, Sir George Thomas at 7, R. P. Michell at 6½, and Theodore Tylor and defending champion Frederick Yates tied at 6.
- Bad Sliač won by Salo Flohr and Milan Vidmar tied at 9½/13, followed by Vasja Pirc at 8½ and Esteban Canal, Géza Maróczy, and Rudolf Spielmann at 8.
- Western Chess Association Championship at Minneapolis won by Reuben Fine with 9½, followed by Samuel Reshevsky at 9, Fred Reinfeld at 8½, and Herman Steiner at 7½.
- Trebitsch Memorial in Vienna is won by Albert Becker with 9/11, ahead of Ernst Grünfeld with 7½ and Erich Eliskases and Baldur Hönlinger tied at 7.

== Matches ==
Alexander Alekhine remains World Champion as no championship matches are held.

- Max Euwe and Salo Flohr draw a match played in Amsterdam (2 wins each and 4 draws) and Prague (1 win each and 6 draws).
- Rudolf Spielmann wins a match in Semmering against Efim Bogoljubov, 4 to 3 and 3 draws.
- Spielmann defeats Gösta Stoltz in a match in Stockholm by 4½-1½.
- Flohr beats Sultan Khan 2 to 1 and 2 draws.
- Euwe beats Spielmann 2 to 0 and 2 draws.

== Exhibitions ==
Several record-breaking exhibitions were held in 1932.

- George Koltanowski played 160 boards simultaneously at Antwerp, with 135 wins, 18 draws, and 6 losses.
- Koltanowski also holds the blindfold simultaneous record with 30 boards, winning 20 and drawing 10 with no losses.
- Alexander Alekhine played 60 teams of five players each in Paris, winning 37, drawing 17, and losing 6.
- José Raúl Capablanca played 66 teams of five players each in Havana, winning 46, drawing 16, and losing 4.

== Births ==
- Fufi Santori in Santurce, Puerto Rico
- January 16 – Victor Ciocâltea in Bucharest, Romanian GM and many time Romanian Champion
- March 23 – Larry Evans in Manhattan, American GM and four-time winner of the US Championship
- April 21 – Lora Yakovleva in Perm, Women's World Correspondence Champion (1972–1977)
- June 15 – Hrvoje Bartolović in Zagreb, problemist
- July 2 – Leopold Mitrofanov in Leningrad, problemist
- August 11 – István Bilek in Budapest, Hungarian GM
- September 14 – Carlos Jáuregui in Santiago, Chilean-Canadian player
- November 1 – Yair Kraidman in Haifa, Israeli GM

== Deaths ==
- January 12 – Daniël Noteboom, 21, Dutch player, namesake of the Noteboom Variation of the Slav Defense
- April 20 – Edgard Colle, 34, Belgian player, namesake of the Colle System
- April 22 – Alexander Fritz, 79, German player, namesake of the Fritz Variation of the Two Knights Defense
- April 22 – Sándor Takács, 39, Hungarian player
- June 15 – Louis van Vliet, 77, Dutch player
- November 4 – Rudolf Loman, 71, Dutch player, winner of several unofficial Dutch Championships
- November 10 – Frederick Yates, 48, English chess player and six-time British Champion
- November 25 – Fritz Riemann, 73, German player
- November 16 – Hermanis Matisons, 38, Latvian player and problemist
