= Liverpool 1923 chess tournament =

Chess tournament held in Liverpool, England, in 1923

The Liverpool 1923 chess tournament was the Premier Tournament of the Northern Counties Chess Union (NCCU) Congress, held at the Liverpool Chess Club from 31 March to 6 April 1923. It was won by Jacques Mieses of Leipzig with 8 points from 9 games, ahead of Géza Maróczy on 7½, with Frederick Yates and Sir George Alan Thomas sharing third place on 6½.

Contemporary reports described the event as the most important chess tournament held in the north of England for many years.

== Background ==
The NCCU Congress at Liverpool was opened on Saturday, 31 March 1923 by Amos Burn, the English master who had been associated with the Liverpool Chess Club for fifty years. The congress comprised five separate competitions: a Premier Tournament, a Major Tournament, a Minor Tournament, an Evening Handicap Tournament, and a Schoolboys' Tournament. The event was managed by J. H. Milton of the Liverpool Chess Club, who received a set of autographed chess books from the competitors at its conclusion. The prizes were distributed by the Lord Mayor of Liverpool, Councillor Wilson.

== Premier Tournament ==
The Premier Tournament was a single round-robin between ten masters. The field combined two veterans of international chess, Mieses and Maróczy, with the leading British players of the period. Yates was the reigning British Champion; Joseph Henry Blake and Thomas were respectively the current and former champions of the City of London Chess Club. The English contingent also included Victor Wahltuch (then resident in London), Harry Holmes of Liverpool, Climenson Yelverton Dawbarn (a former Champion of Lancashire), and Edmund Spencer of Liverpool.

Mieses, in his 59th year, secured the title with notable wins over Thomas and Yates using the Scotch Game, an opening then considered somewhat outdated at master level. The result was a late-career tournament success for Mieses, whose previous outright tournament victory of note had been at the Vienna Trebitsch Memorial in 1907.

Premier Tournament, Liverpool 1923
#	Player	Residence	1	2	3	4	5	6	7	8	9	10	Total
1	Jacques Mieses	Leipzig		½	1	1	1	1	1	1	½	1	8
2	Géza Maróczy	Hastings	½		1	½	½	1	1	1	1	1	7½
3	Frederick Yates	Leeds	0	0		1	½	1	1	1	1	1	6½
4	Sir George Alan Thomas	London	0	½	0		1	1	1	1	1	1	6½
5	Joseph Henry Blake	London	0	½	½	0		0	1	1	1	1	5
6	Edmund Spencer	Liverpool	0	0	0	0	1		0	1	1	1	4
7	Victor Leonard Wahltuch	Manchester	0	0	0	0	0	1		½	1	1	3½
8	Harry Holmes	Liverpool	0	0	0	0	0	0	½		½	1	2
9	Allan William Edward Louis	London	½	0	0	0	0	0	0	½		0	1
10	Climenson Yelverton Dawbarn	Manchester	0	0	0	0	0	0	0	0	1		1

== Major Tournament ==
The Major Tournament was won by John Arthur James Drewitt of Hastings with 7 points from 9 games, half a point ahead of William Henry Watts of London on 6½. (Francis) Percival Wenman of Leeds took third place with 6 points.

The field included an entrant under the pseudonym "N O Bodey", an anonymous amateur from Liverpool whose true identity has not been disclosed in surviving records.

The Major Tournament also featured the chess debut of the fifteen-year-old Liverpool schoolboy Gerald Abrahams, a pupil at Liverpool Collegiate School, who had approached the Liverpool Chess Club shortly before the congress and asked to be admitted to a competition. After a brief assessment by Spencer, he was entered in the Major and opened with three consecutive wins. He went on to lose to Drewitt and Watts in successive rounds.

== Other tournaments ==
The Minor Tournament was won by Henry Ashwell Cadman of Bradford, playing under the pseudonym "C A Mann", with 7½ points from 9 games, ahead of John Whitworth of Stockport (7) and Charles Aubrey Saban of Chester (6). The Schoolboys' Tournament was won by Neville Worton Riley, with his brother Ronald Sinclair Riley taking second place.
