= Caro–Kann Defence =

Position: a8 black rook, b8 black knight, c8 black bishop, d8 black queen, e8 black king, f8 black bishop, g8 black knight, h8 black rook, a7 black pawn, b7 black pawn, d7 black pawn, e7 black pawn, f7 black pawn, g7 black pawn, h7 black pawn, c6 black pawn, e4 white pawn, a2 white pawn, b2 white pawn, c2 white pawn, d2 white pawn, f2 white pawn, g2 white pawn, h2 white pawn, a1 white rook, b1 white knight, c1 white bishop, d1 white queen, e1 white king, f1 white bishop, g1 white knight, h1 white rook
- Moves: 1.e4 c6
- ECO: B10–B19
- Origin: Bruederschaft (journal), 1886
- Named after: Horatio Caro and Marcus Kann
- Parent: King's Pawn Game

The Caro–Kann Defence is a chess opening beginning with the moves:

1. e4 c6

Black prepares to contest the centre with 2...d5. It is a common defence against 1.e4. The Caro–Kann Defence reflects chess principles such as central control. The Caro–Kann is considered a positional opening, though there are still plenty of tactical variations.

The Caro–Kann is classified as a Semi-Open Game, like the Sicilian Defence and the French Defence, although it is thought to be more solid and less dynamic than the Sicilian. Unlike the similarly motivated French Defence, the Caro–Kann does not hinder the development of Black's queen's bishop. This comes at the cost of a tempo, however, because Black has to play 1...c6 before pushing the pawn to c5, whereas Black can push c7–c5 in one move in the French. The lost tempo means Black can lag in development.

White can combat the Caro–Kann in several different ways. The main line is 2.d4 d5, after which White has a choice between 3.Nc3, leading to the Classical Variation and others; 3.e5, the Advance Variation; 3.exd5, the Exchange Variation; and 3.Nd2, which has little independent significance from 3.Nc3. (Note: 2.d4 d5 3.Nc3 and 2.d4 d5 3.Nd2 usually transpose into the same position after 3...dxe4 4.Nxe4.)

The Caro–Kann remains a popular opening in top-level chess, being employed by grandmasters (GMs) Alireza Firouzja, Vladislav Artemiev and Ding Liren, among others.

== History ==
Mieses vs. Kann, Hamburg 1885

Position: e8 black king, h8 black rook, a7 black pawn, b7 black pawn, f7 black pawn, g7 black pawn, h7 black pawn, b6 black queen, e6 black pawn, d5 black pawn, e5 white pawn, d4 white queen, f4 white pawn, a3 white pawn, b3 white pawn, g2 white pawn, h2 white pawn, a1 white rook, b1 white knight, c1 black rook, d1 white rook, g1 white king

Position after 17...Rc1

The opening is named after the English player Horatio Caro and the Austrian player Marcus Kann, both of whom analysed it in 1886. Kann scored an impressive 24-move victory with the Caro–Kann Defence against German-British chess champion Jacques Mieses at the 4th German Chess Congress in Hamburg in May 1885:

1.e4 c6 2.d4 d5 3.e5 Bf5 4.Bd3 Bxd3 5.Qxd3 e6 6.f4 c5 7.c3 Nc6 8.Nf3 Qb6 9.0-0 Nh6 10.b3 cxd4 11.cxd4 Nf5 12.Bb2 Rc8 13.a3 Ncxd4 14.Nxd4 Bc5 15.Rd1 Nxd4 16.Bxd4 Bxd4+ 17.Qxd4 Rc1 (diagram) 18.Kf2 Rxd1 19.Qxb6 axb6 20.Ke2 Rc1 21.Kd2 Rg1 22.g3 Kd7 23.a4 Rc8 24.b4 Rcc1 0–1

== 2.d4 d5 3.Nc3 (or 3.Nd2) ==
3.Nc3 and 3.Nd2 usually transpose into each other after 3...dxe4 4.Nxe4. The main alternative to 3...dxe4 is 3...g6, preparing to fianchetto. In the late 20th century, 3.Nd2 increased in popularity to avoid the Gurgenidze Variation (3.Nc3 g6) and retain the option of 4.c3, though Black can still opt for 3...g6 after 3.Nd2. There are also other third move possibilities for Black, but they are rare.

=== Classical Variation: 3...dxe4 4.Nxe4 Bf5 ===
Position: a8 black rook, b8 black knight, d8 black queen, e8 black king, f8 black bishop, g8 black knight, h8 black rook, a7 black pawn, b7 black pawn, e7 black pawn, f7 black pawn, g7 black pawn, h7 black pawn, c6 black pawn, f5 black bishop, d4 white pawn, e4 white knight, a2 white pawn, b2 white pawn, c2 white pawn, f2 white pawn, g2 white pawn, h2 white pawn, a1 white rook, c1 white bishop, d1 white queen, e1 white king, f1 white bishop, g1 white knight, h1 white rook

Classical Variation after 4...Bf5

The most common way of handling the Caro–Kann, the Classical Variation (also referred to as the Capablanca Variation after Cuban world champion José Raúl Capablanca), is defined by the moves: 2.d4 d5 3.Nc3 (or 3.Nd2) dxe4 4.Nxe4 Bf5. This was long considered to represent best play for both sides in the Caro–Kann. White usually continues: 5.Ng3 Bg6 6.h4 h6 7.Nf3 Nd7 8.h5 Bh7 9.Bd3 Bxd3 10.Qxd3. Although White's pawn on h5 looks ready to attack, it can prove to be a weakness in an endgame.

Much of the Caro–Kann's reputation as a solid defence stems from this variation. Black makes very few compromises in pawn structure and plays a timely c6–c5 to contest the d4-square. Variations with Black castling queenside gave the Caro–Kann its reputation of being solid but somewhat boring. More popular recently are variations with Black castling kingside or even leaving the king in the centre. These variations can be sharp and dynamic. The Caro–Kann is frequently used by top-level players in competitive games.

Here is a brilliancy illustrating White's attacking chances when the players castle on opposite sides in the Classical Variation:

Lev Milman vs. Joseph Fang, Foxwoods Open 2005
1. e4 c6 2. d4 d5 3. Nc3 dxe4 4. Nxe4 Bf5 5. Ng3 Bg6 6. h4 h6 7. Nf3 Nd7 8. h5 Bh7 9. Bd3 Bxd3 10. Qxd3 e6 (10...Qc7 avoids White's next) 11. Bf4 Bb4+ 12. c3 Be7 13. 0-0-0 Ngf6 14. Kb1 0-0 15. Ne5 c5?! (15...Qa5 is usual and better) 16. Qf3 Qb6? (necessary was 16...cxd4 17.Rxd4 Nxe5 18.Bxe5 Qc8 19.Rhd1 Rd8 20.Ne4 with a small White advantage) 17. Nxd7 Nxd7 18. d5 exd5 19. Nf5! Bf6 20. Rxd5 Qe6 21. Bxh6 Ne5 (21...gxh6 22.Rd6 Qe8 23.Rxf6 Nxf6 24.Qg3+ mates on g7) 22. Qe4 Nc6 23. Qf3 Ne5? (23...gxh6 24.Rd6 Qe5 25.Nxh6+ Kg7 26.Nf5+ Kh7 with an unclear position) 24. Qe4 Nc6 25. Qg4! Qxd5 (25...Ne5 26.Rxe5 Qxe5 27.Bxg7 Bxg7 28.h6 wins) 26. Bxg7 Qd3+ 27. Ka1 Ne5 28. Ne7+!! Kh7 29. Qg6+!! fxg6 30. hxg6+ Kxg7 31. Rh7# (White is down a queen, rook and bishop!)

=== Steinitz Variation: 3...dxe4 4.Nxe4 Nd7 ===
Position: a8 black rook, c8 black bishop, d8 black queen, e8 black king, f8 black bishop, g8 black knight, h8 black rook, a7 black pawn, b7 black pawn, d7 black knight, e7 black pawn, f7 black pawn, g7 black pawn, h7 black pawn, c6 black pawn, d4 white pawn, e4 white knight, a2 white pawn, b2 white pawn, c2 white pawn, f2 white pawn, g2 white pawn, h2 white pawn, a1 white rook, c1 white bishop, d1 white queen, e1 white king, f1 white bishop, g1 white knight, h1 white rook

Steinitz Variation: 4...Nd7

Another solid positional line, the Steinitz Variation begins 2.d4 d5 3.Nc3 (or 3.Nd2) dxe4 4.Nxe4 Nd7. Played by and named after the first world champion Wilhelm Steinitz, it has also been called the Smyslov Variation, the Karpov Variation, and the Modern Variation. The short-term goal of 4...Nd7 is to ease development by the early exchange of a pair of knights without compromising the structural integrity of Black's position.

Play is similar to the Classical Variation except that Black has more freedom by delaying the development of the bishop, and is not forced to move it to square g6. This freedom comes at a cost, however, as White enjoys added freedom in taking up space in the centre, and often plays the aggressive 5.Ng5!?. The famous last game of the Deep Blue versus Garry Kasparov rematch where Kasparov committed a known blunder and lost was played in this line. Black must also beware of the quick mating trap for White, 5.Qe2 Ngf6?? 6.Nd6# (smothered mate), but after 5...Ndf6, Black enjoys a solid position.

=== Bronstein–Larsen Variation: 3...dxe4 4.Nxe4 Nf6 5.Nxf6+ gxf6 ===
Position: a8 black rook, b8 black knight, c8 black bishop, d8 black queen, e8 black king, f8 black bishop, h8 black rook, a7 black pawn, b7 black pawn, e7 black pawn, f7 black pawn, h7 black pawn, c6 black pawn, f6 black pawn, d4 white pawn, a2 white pawn, b2 white pawn, c2 white pawn, f2 white pawn, g2 white pawn, h2 white pawn, a1 white rook, c1 white bishop, d1 white queen, e1 white king, f1 white bishop, g1 white knight, h1 white rook

Bronstein–Larsen Variation: 5...gxf6

With 4...Nf6 5.Nxf6+ gxf6, Black voluntarily opts for an inferior pawn structure and a practical necessity of castling queenside, while gaining dynamic compensation in the form of the open g-file for the rook, leading to unusually active play by the Caro–Kann's standards. It is generally considered somewhat unsound, though world championship challenger David Bronstein and former world championship candidate Bent Larsen employed it with some success, leading to the name Bronstein–Larsen Variation.

=== Korchnoi Variation: 3...dxe4 4.Nxe4 Nf6 5.Nxf6+ exf6 ===
Position: a8 black rook, b8 black knight, c8 black bishop, d8 black queen, e8 black king, f8 black bishop, h8 black rook, a7 black pawn, b7 black pawn, f7 black pawn, g7 black pawn, h7 black pawn, c6 black pawn, f6 black pawn, d4 white pawn, a2 white pawn, b2 white pawn, c2 white pawn, f2 white pawn, g2 white pawn, h2 white pawn, a1 white rook, c1 white bishop, d1 white queen, e1 white king, f1 white bishop, g1 white knight, h1 white rook

Korchnoi Variation: 5...exf6

5...exf6, known as the Korchnoi Variation and the Tartakower Variation, was played by Viktor Korchnoi many times, including in his first world championship match with Anatoly Karpov, and the line has also been employed by Ulf Andersson. Black's 5...exf6 is regarded as sounder than 5...gxf6!? of the Bronstein–Larsen Variation and offers Black rapid development, though also ceding White the superior pawn structure and long-term prospects (Black has to be cautious that the d-pawn is now a potential passed pawn in the endgame).

=== Gurgenidze Variation: 3.Nc3 g6 ===
Position: a8 black rook, b8 black knight, c8 black bishop, d8 black queen, e8 black king, f8 black bishop, g8 black knight, h8 black rook, a7 black pawn, b7 black pawn, e7 black pawn, f7 black pawn, h7 black pawn, c6 black pawn, g6 black pawn, d5 black pawn, d4 white pawn, e4 white pawn, c3 white knight, a2 white pawn, b2 white pawn, c2 white pawn, f2 white pawn, g2 white pawn, h2 white pawn, a1 white rook, c1 white bishop, d1 white queen, e1 white king, f1 white bishop, g1 white knight, h1 white rook

Gurgenidze Variation: 3...g6

3.Nc3 g6, the Gurgenidze Variation, is the only common alternative to 3.Nc3 dxe4. Black prepares to fianchetto the bishop on g7, creating pressure against White's d4-pawn. After 4.Nf3 Bg7 White usually plays 5.h3 to prevent the ...Bg4 pin. This variation, originated by Bukhuti Gurgenidze, led to a rise in the popularity of 3.Nd2 during the 1970s. After 3.Nd2, 3...g6 is met by 4.c3, when the fianchettoed bishop has little to do because of a dark-squared pawn chain. 3.Nd2 will usually transpose into the Classical Variation after 3...dxe4 4.Nxe4.

=== Other lines after 3.Nc3 ===
Position: a8 black rook, b8 black knight, c8 black bishop, d8 black queen, e8 black king, f8 black bishop, g8 black knight, h8 black rook, b7 black pawn, e7 black pawn, f7 black pawn, g7 black pawn, h7 black pawn, a6 black pawn, c6 black pawn, d5 black pawn, d4 white pawn, e4 white pawn, c3 white knight, a2 white pawn, b2 white pawn, c2 white pawn, f2 white pawn, g2 white pawn, h2 white pawn, a1 white rook, c1 white bishop, d1 white queen, e1 white king, f1 white bishop, g1 white knight, h1 white rook

3.Nc3 a6

There are some rare alternatives where Black avoids or delays trading off the central pawn on d5.

- 3...a6 has the main line 4.Nf3 Bg4, which can lead into a French structure after moves like 5.Be2 e6 6.0-0 Nf6 7.e5 Nfd7 followed by c5, Nc6 and Qb6. Other options for White are the transpositions into the Exchange or the Advance Variation (with Nc3 and ...a6).
- 3...b5 threatens to kick White's knight after ...b4.
- 3...Nf6 can be met with 4.e5, kicking Black's knight.

== Advance Variation: 3.e5 ==
=== Main line: 3...Bf5 ===
Position: a8 black rook, b8 black knight, d8 black queen, e8 black king, f8 black bishop, g8 black knight, h8 black rook, a7 black pawn, b7 black pawn, e7 black pawn, f7 black pawn, g7 black pawn, h7 black pawn, c6 black pawn, d5 black pawn, e5 white pawn, f5 black bishop, d4 white pawn, a2 white pawn, b2 white pawn, c2 white pawn, f2 white pawn, g2 white pawn, h2 white pawn, a1 white rook, b1 white knight, c1 white bishop, d1 white queen, e1 white king, f1 white bishop, g1 white knight, h1 white rook

Advance Variation with 3...Bf5

The variation that follows 2.d4 d5 3.e5 Bf5, where White immediately secures a space advantage, became the most popular line in the 21st century after having previously been widely regarded as inferior for many years, owing chiefly to the strategic demolition that Aron Nimzowitsch (playing as White) suffered at the hands of José Capablanca in one of their games at the New York 1927 tournament.

The Advance Variation has since been revitalised by aggressive lines such as the Bayonet Attack (4.g4) or the Van der Wiel Attack (4.Nc3 e6 5.g4), a popular line in the 1980s and later favoured by Latvian grandmaster Alexei Shirov, or the less ambitious variation 4.Nf3 e6 5.Be2 c5 6.Be3, popularised by English GM Nigel Short and often seen in the 1990s. Another less popular but aggressive line is 4.h4, the Tal Variation, popularised by GM Mikhail Tal.

=== Arkell–Khenkin Variation: 3...c5 ===
Position: a8 black rook, b8 black knight, c8 black bishop, d8 black queen, e8 black king, f8 black bishop, g8 black knight, h8 black rook, a7 black pawn, b7 black pawn, e7 black pawn, f7 black pawn, g7 black pawn, h7 black pawn, c5 black pawn, d5 black pawn, e5 white pawn, d4 white pawn, a2 white pawn, b2 white pawn, c2 white pawn, f2 white pawn, g2 white pawn, h2 white pawn, a1 white rook, b1 white knight, c1 white bishop, d1 white queen, e1 white king, f1 white bishop, g1 white knight, h1 white rook

Advance Variation with 3...c5

3...c5, which has been called the Arkell–Khenkin Variation and the Botvinnik–Carls Defence, is an important alternative to 3...Bf5. It is a sharp line which avoids the theory associated with 3...Bf5. It was used by Mikhail Botvinnik in his 1961 match versus Mikhail Tal (though with a negative outcome for Botvinnik – two draws and a loss). The line was dubbed the "Arkell/Khenkin Variation" in the leading chess magazine New in Chess (in Yearbook 42) in recognition of the work Keith Arkell and Igor Khenkin did on the variation. White can attempt to exploit Black's move by capturing with 4.dxc5, though this weakens White's central bind, and Black has good chances of regaining the pawn. A common alternative is 4.Nf3, typically met with 4...cxd4.

== Exchange Variation: 3.exd5 cxd5 ==
=== Main line: 4.Bd3 ===
Position: a8 black rook, b8 black knight, c8 black bishop, d8 black queen, e8 black king, f8 black bishop, g8 black knight, h8 black rook, a7 black pawn, b7 black pawn, e7 black pawn, f7 black pawn, g7 black pawn, h7 black pawn, d5 black pawn, d4 white pawn, d3 white bishop, a2 white pawn, b2 white pawn, c2 white pawn, f2 white pawn, g2 white pawn, h2 white pawn, a1 white rook, b1 white knight, c1 white bishop, d1 white queen, e1 white king, g1 white knight, h1 white rook

Exchange Variation with 4.Bd3

The main line of the Exchange Variation begins with 3.exd5 cxd5 (Note: 3.exd5 Qxd5 usually transposes to the Scandinavian Defence after 4.Nc3 and then 4...Qa5, 4...Qd6, or 4...Qd8.) 4.Bd3. Bd3 prevents ...Bf5 while still developing. The most common continuation is 4...Nc6 5.c3 Nf6 6.Bf4 Bg4 7.Qb3. This line is considered to offer White a slightly better game and was tried by Bobby Fischer. The pawn structure resembles a Carlsbad structure with reversed colours, so some of the strategic ideas are analogous to the Queen's Gambit Declined, Exchange Variation (1.d4 d5 2.c4 e6 3.Nc3 Nf6 4.cxd5 exd5).

=== Panov–Botvinnik Attack: 4.c4 ===
Position: a8 black rook, b8 black knight, c8 black bishop, d8 black queen, e8 black king, f8 black bishop, g8 black knight, h8 black rook, a7 black pawn, b7 black pawn, e7 black pawn, f7 black pawn, g7 black pawn, h7 black pawn, d5 black pawn, c4 white pawn, d4 white pawn, a2 white pawn, b2 white pawn, f2 white pawn, g2 white pawn, h2 white pawn, a1 white rook, b1 white knight, c1 white bishop, d1 white queen, e1 white king, f1 white bishop, g1 white knight, h1 white rook

Panov–Botvinnik Attack

The Panov–Botvinnik Attack begins with the move 4.c4. It is named after Vasily Panov and the world champion Mikhail Botvinnik. This system often leads to typical isolated queen's pawn (IQP) positions, with White obtaining rapid development, a grip on e5, and kingside attacking chances to compensate for the long-term structural weakness of the isolated d4-pawn. The major variation in this line is 4...Nf6 5.Nc3 e6 6.Nf3, when Black's main alternatives are 6...Bb4 (a position often transposing into lines of the Nimzo-Indian Defence) and 6...Be7, once the most common line. 6...Nc6?! is inferior as it is favourably met by 7.c5!, after which White plans on seizing the e5-square by advancing the b-pawn to b5, or by exchanging the black knight on c6 after Bb5.

== Fantasy Variation: 3.f3 ==
Position: a8 black rook, b8 black knight, c8 black bishop, d8 black queen, e8 black king, f8 black bishop, g8 black knight, h8 black rook, a7 black pawn, b7 black pawn, e7 black pawn, f7 black pawn, g7 black pawn, h7 black pawn, c6 black pawn, d5 black pawn, d4 white pawn, e4 white pawn, f3 white pawn, a2 white pawn, b2 white pawn, c2 white pawn, g2 white pawn, h2 white pawn, a1 white rook, b1 white knight, c1 white bishop, d1 white queen, e1 white king, f1 white bishop, g1 white knight, h1 white rook

Fantasy Variation

The Fantasy Variation, also known as the Maróczy or Tartakower Variation, occurs after 2.d4 d5 3.f3. White invites 3...dxe4 4.fxe4 (4.Nc3 transposes to a line of the Blackmar–Diemer Gambit). 3...e6 is probably the most solid response, preparing to exploit the dark squares via ...c5. Fianchettoing with 3...g6 has been tried by Yasser Seirawan. A rarer option is 3...e5, which aims to exploit White's weaknesses on the a7–g1 diagonal. Another idea that has risen in popularity 3...Qb6, a variation championed by Baadur Jobava.

After 3...dxe4 4.fxe4, 4...e5 is the main move; Nigel Davies describes the line as the sharpest of the Fantasy Variation and dangerous for Black. 5.Nf3 exd4 6.Bc4 is a sacrificial line played as early as 1899 by Géza Maróczy. GMs Lars Schandorff and Sam Shankland both prefer 5...Bg4 6.Bc4 Nd7 7.0-0 Ngf6 8.c3 Bd6 with play being sharp and double-edged, though recent theory suggest that 7.c3! is more critical, giving a small objective advantage for White.

== Alternatives to 2.d4 d5 ==
=== Two Knights Variation: 2.Nc3 d5 3.Nf3 ===
Position: a8 black rook, b8 black knight, c8 black bishop, d8 black queen, e8 black king, f8 black bishop, g8 black knight, h8 black rook, a7 black pawn, b7 black pawn, e7 black pawn, f7 black pawn, g7 black pawn, h7 black pawn, c6 black pawn, d5 black pawn, e4 white pawn, c3 white knight, f3 white knight, a2 white pawn, b2 white pawn, c2 white pawn, d2 white pawn, f2 white pawn, g2 white pawn, h2 white pawn, a1 white rook, c1 white bishop, d1 white queen, e1 white king, f1 white bishop, h1 white rook

Two Knights Variation

The Two Knights Variation, 2.Nc3 d5 3.Nf3 (or 2.Nf3 d5 3.Nc3), was played by Bobby Fischer in his youth, but has since declined in popularity. White's intention is to benefit from rapid development as well as to retain options regarding the d-pawn. Black's logical and probably best reply is 3...Bg4. After 4.h3 Bxf3 5.Qxf3, the positional continuation, Black has the option of 5...Nf6 or 5...e6. Retreating with 4...Bh5 is playable but Black must be careful. In Noteboom–Mindeno 1927, Black lost quickly after 5.exd5 cxd5 6.g4 Bg6 7.Ne5 a6? (7...Nc6 is necessary) 8.h4 d4 9.h5! dxc3 10.hxg6 cxd2+ 11.Qxd2 Qxd2+ 12.Bxd2 and Black must lose material.

This variation sets a trap: playing along the lines of the Classical Variation gets Black in trouble after 3...dxe4 4.Nxe4 Bf5 (4...Nd7 is playable) 5.Ng3 Bg6?! (5...Bg4) 6.h4 h6 7.Ne5 Bh7 (7...Qd6 may be best) 8.Qh5! g6 (forced) 9.Bc4! e6 (9...gxh5?? 10.Bxf7#) 10.Qe2!? (10.Qf3!) with a huge advantage for White. Now 10...Qe7! is best. Instead, Lasker–Radsheer, 1908 and Alekhine–Bruce, 1938 ended quickly after, respectively, 10...Bg7?? 11.Nxf7! and 10...Nf6?? 11.Nxf7! Alternatively, White can continue with 9.Qf3 Nf6 10.Qb3 Qd5 11.Qxb2, which wins the exchange but requires careful attention to the queen in the corner to maintain the advantage.

=== Goldman Variation: 2.Nc3 d5 3.Qf3 ===
After the moves 2.Nc3 d5 3.Qf3, the Goldman Variation, White's position is sound according to Graham Burgess.

=== Accelerated Panov Attack: 2.c4 ===
2.c4, the Accelerated Panov Attack, is an effective move for White. Black will probably play 2...d5. This can transpose to the Panov–Botvinnik (B14, given above, with 3.exd5 cxd5 4.d4) or Caro–Kann (B10, with the double capture on d5). Alternatively, Black may play 2...e5, the Open Variation. The 2.c4 line can also arise by transposition from the English Opening: 1.c4 c6 2.e4.

=== Hillbilly Attack: 2.Bc4 ===
2.Bc4, sometimes called the Hillbilly Attack, has an inferior reputation because after 2...d5 3.exd5 cxd5, White must move the bishop again, losing a tempo. However, 2.Bc4 has emerged as a surprise weapon in online blitz chess because of the gambit line 3.Bb3, which has been advocated by Simon Williams. If Black accepts the pawn with 3...dxe4, White may play 4.Qh5, leading to sharp play. Black usually plays 4...g6 or 4...e6 to blunt White's threat to capture on f7, which is defended only by Black's king.

The name "Hillbilly Attack" is attributed by Williams to National Master Jack Young, who allegedly used the term to describe the unrefined nature of the move, and claimed to invent it in 1988. Williams, who played it as early as 2011, featured it in his "Spicy Gambits" series in 2015.

=== Breyer Variation: 2.d3 ===
2.d3, the Breyer Variation, can lead to an endgame after 2...d5 3.Nf3 dxe4 4.dxe4 Qxd1+ 5.Kxd1, though White more often avoids it with 3.Nd2. The 3.Nf3 endgame line, which received increased attention in the 21st century, is also frequently reached via 2.Nf3.

=== 2.Nf3 ===
After 2.Nf3 d5, in addition to 3.Nc3, transposing to the Two Knights Variation, and 3.d3, transposing to the Breyer Variation, another possible line is 3.exd5 cxd5 4.Ne5!?, sometimes referred to as the Apocalypse Attack, which sets some traps for Black. For example, 4...Bf5? immediately runs into trouble after 5.Bb5+, when Black must lose a tempo and the bishop pair with 5...Bd7 (5..Nd7?? 6.Qf3 is disastrous for Black). The game can continue 6.Qh5 g6 7.Nxd7! Nxd7 (7...gxh5?? 8.Nf6#) 8.Qxd5, where White wins a pawn and enjoys a strong initiative. This variation is similar to the traditional Exchange Caro–Kann (in which playing Ne5 is one of White's goals) with the added benefit that the pin ...Bg4 has been sidestepped entirely. After 4...Nc6, White may proceed with d4 and Bb5, responding to ...Qb6 with c4 (the Neo-Panov–Botvinnik Attack) and to ...Bd7 with Nxd7 to acquire the two bishops, or he may play in a Stonewall fashion with d4, c3, Bd3, and f4 in some order. While 4...e6 is a perfectly acceptable Black response—and appears to be the most often played—the response 4...g6! is critical, allowing Black flexibility in fighting for e5.

=== Other lines ===
Other lines are ineffective or doubtful. These include 2.b3, the Euwe Attack; 2.b4, the Labahn Attack; 2.g4, the Spike Variation; and 2.Ne2, the Bohemian Attack.

== ECO codes ==
The Encyclopaedia of Chess Openings has ten codes for the Caro–Kann Defence, B10 through B19:

- B10 (miscellaneous 2nd moves by White)
- B11 (Two Knights Variation with 3...Bg4)
- B12 (miscellaneous lines with 2.d4)
- B13 (Exchange Variation)
- B14 (Panov–Botvinnik Attack without 5...e6)
- B15 (3.Nc3, miscellaneous lines)
- B16 (Bronstein–Larsen Variation)
- B17 (Steinitz Variation)
- B18 (Classical Variation)
- B19 (Classical Variation with 7...Nd7)

== See also ==
- List of chess openings
- List of chess openings named after people
