= Marcus Kann =

Austrian chess player

Jacques Mieses vs. Marcus Kann
4th German Chess Congress
Hamburg, Germany - 1885

Position: g1 white king, d1 white rook, c1 black rook, b1 white knight, a1 white rook, h2 white pawn, g2 white pawn, b3 white pawn, a3 white pawn, f4 white pawn, d4 white queen, e5 white pawn, d5 black pawn, e6 black pawn, b6 black queen, h7 black pawn, g7 black pawn, f7 black pawn, b7 black pawn, a7 black pawn, h8 black rook, e8 black king

After 17... Rc1! White couldn't escape losing the exchange and soon the game.

Marcus Kann (1820 in Vienna – February 3, 1886) was an Austrian chess player. Horatio Caro published his analysis of the chess opening later to-be-called Caro–Kann Defence (1.e4 c6) in the German Brüderschaft magazine in 1886 October 30th.

During the 4th German Chess Congress in Hamburg in May 1885, Kann defeated German-British champion Jacques Mieses with the Caro–Kann Defence (ECO B12) in 24 moves. This game by Kann was added to the final tournament book, but his games from the main tournament, where he earned four points from seven games, failing to qualify to win his group, remain unpublished.
