= Joseph Henry Blake (chess player) =

English chess player (1859–1951)

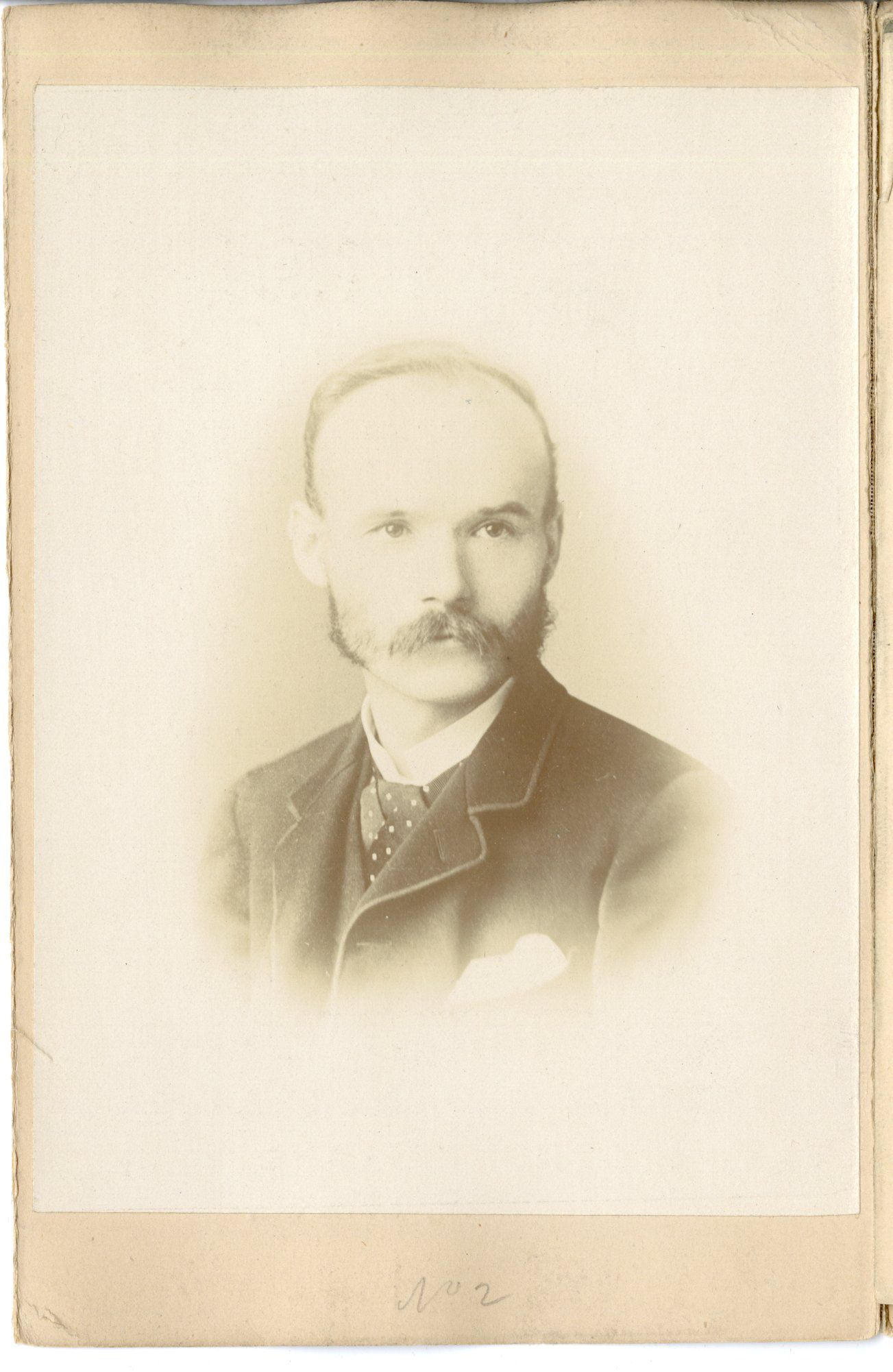

Personal information
- Born: Joseph Henry Blake; 3 February 1859 Farnborough, Hampshire
- Died: 11 December 1951 (aged 92) Kingston-upon-Thames

Chess career
- Country: England

Joseph Henry Blake (3 February 1859, Farnborough, Hampshire – 11 December 1951, Kingston-upon-Thames) was an English chess master.

Blake won many tournaments played in England toward the end of the 19th century and the beginning of the 20th century. He won at Stamford 1887, Oxford 1891 (joint), Brighton 1892, Cambridge 1893, and Salisbury 1898 (joint). He also took 5th at Manchester 1882, tied for 3-4th at Birmingham 1883 (Section B), took 4th at Bath 1884, tied for 6-8th at London 1889 (Henry Bird won), took 2nd at Cambridge 1890, tied for 3rd-4th at Woodhall Spa 1893, shared 2nd at Craigside 1895, took 3rd at Hastings (Amateur) 1895, took 2nd, behind Henry Ernest Atkins, at Bristol 1896, and won at Folkestone 1901.

He took 2nd in an international correspondence tournament organised by Le Monde Illustré in 1895, shared 1st in the 1909 British Championship in Scarborough but lost to Atkins the play-off, and shared 1st at London 1911. He was British correspondence champion in 1922.

Blake represented England in cable matches against the United States in 1902, 1909 and 1910.

His best achievement was victory, ahead of Géza Maróczy, George Alan Thomas, Frederick Yates and Boris Kostić, at Weston-super-Mare 1922. He shared 2nd at London 1922 (Major Open), tied for 7-8th at Hastings International Chess Congress 1922/23 (Akiba Rubinstein won), took 2nd, behind Thomas, at London 1923, took 5th at Liverpool 1923 (Jacques Mieses won), tied for 7-8th at Hastings 1923/24 (Max Euwe won), tied for 6-7th at Weston-super-Mare 1924 (Euwe won), took 2nd, behind R.P. Michell, at London 1925, took 4th at London 1926 (Victor Buerger won), and tied for 7-9th at Weston-super-Mare 1926 (Euwe won).

He was the author of Chess endings for beginners (London 1900).
