= Gerald Abrahams =

English chess player, author, and barrister

Gerald Abrahams in 1933 National Portrait Gallery, London

Gerald Abrahams (15 April 1907 – 15 March 1980) was an English chess player, author, and barrister.

== Chess career ==
Abrahams Defence
Position: a8 black rook, b8 black knight, d8 black queen, e8 black king, g8 black knight, h8 black rook, b7 black bishop, f7 black pawn, g7 black pawn, h7 black pawn, e6 black pawn, a5 black pawn, b5 black pawn, c4 black pawn, d4 white pawn, b3 white pawn, c3 white bishop, e3 white pawn, f3 white knight, f2 white pawn, g2 white pawn, h2 white pawn, a1 white rook, d1 white queen, e1 white king, f1 white bishop, h1 white rook
Position after 10... Bb7
- Moves: 1.d4 d5 2.c4 e6 3.Nc3 c6 4.Nf3 dxc4 5.a4 Bb4 6.e3 b5 7.Bd2 a5 8.axb5 Bxc3 9.Bxc3 cxb5 10.b3 Bb7
- ECO: D31
- Named after: Gerald Abrahams
- Parent: QGD Semi-Slav
- Synonyms: Abrahams–Noteboom Variation; Noteboom Variation

He is best known for the Abrahams Defence of the Semi-Slav, also known as the Abrahams–Noteboom Variation, or the Noteboom Variation:
1.d4 d5 2.c4 c6 3.Nc3 e6 4.Nf3 dxc4 5.e3 b5 6.a4 Bb4 7.Bd2 a5 8.axb5 Bxc3 9.Bxc3 cxb5 10.b3 Bb7 (ECO D31).

Abrahams played his first competitive event at the NCCU Major Tournament at Liverpool in March 1923, at the age of fifteen. He approached the Liverpool Chess Club shortly before the congress and was admitted to the Major Tournament after a brief assessment by Edmund Spencer. He opened with three consecutive wins before losing to the eventual winner J. A. J. Drewitt and to W. H. Watts. In 1933 he was third at Hastings in the British Championship, after Mir Sultan Khan and Theodore Tylor.

Abrahams was known as a strong blindfold player. In 1934 he took on four strong Irish players, playing blindfold, at the Belgravia Hotel in Belfast, winning two games and drawing two.

In the Anglo-Soviet radio match of 1946 he scored one win and one draw against Viacheslav Ragozin on board 10.

== Author ==
Abrahams was the author of several chess books, including Teach Yourself Chess (1948),The Chess Mind (1951), Handbook of Chess (1960), Technique in Chess (1961), Test Your Chess (1963), The Pan Book of Chess (1966), Not Only Chess (1974), and Brilliancies in Chess (1977).

Bridge

- Brains in Bridge (1962)

Legal, Philosophical and Political

- Law Affecting Police and Public (1938)
- Law Relating to Hire Purchase (1939)
- Ugly Angel (1940)
- Retribution (1941)
- Day of Reckoning (1943)
- World Turns Left (1943)
- Conscience Makes Heroes (1945)
- Lunatics and Lawyers (1951)
- Law for Writers and Journalists (1958)
- According to the Evidence (1958)
- The Legal Mind (1954)
- Police Questioning: The Judges' Rules (1964)
- Trade Unions and the Law (1968)
- Morality and the Law (1971).

Religion

- The Jewish Mind (1961)

Geography/History

- Let's Look at Israel (1966)

== Political views ==
Abrahams was a Liberal in a period of low success for that party in Britain, the period from 1920 to 1960, and stood in the Sheffield Hallam constituency garnering 7.7% of the vote in 1945, after four national elections in which no Liberal had stood for the seat.
