= Georg Schories =

German chess master

Georg Schories (George Shories) (9 January 1874, in Berlin – 2 December 1934, in Berlin) was a German chess master.

Born in Berlin, he travelled first to Paris, then England, where for many years he, as George Shories, made his home. During World War I, Georg Schories suffered internment, then returned to Germany.

He won at Canterbury 1903, and drew a match with Paul Saladin Leonhardt (2 : 2) at London 1904. Schories earned his master title in Barmen 1905 (B tournament), where he tied for first and defeated Savielly Tartakower in their play-off match (2.5 : 1.5). He tied for 9-10th at Scheveningen 1905 (Frank James Marshall won). He won the amateur competition ahead of Hector William Shoosmith in the Ostend 1907 chess tournament (B tournament), then played less successfully in the General Masters' tournament.

He won at Tunbridge Wells 1908, shared 1st with Victor Wahltuch at Blackpool 1907, shared 1st with Frederick Yates at Blackpool 1910, but lost the play-off match (0 : 4), took 2nd behind Yates at Bromley 1910, tied for 3rd-5th at Oxford 1910, and won at Glasgow 1911. Towards the end of 1912, he and John O'Hanlon played a series of 19 friendly games (+11 –7 =1) while Shories was on a visit to the north of Ireland. In May 1914, he won at Belfast with 10½ out of 11. He won at Chester 1914.

After the war, he tied for 5-7th at Hamburg 1921 (the 21st DSB Congress, Ehrhardt Post won), tied for 3rd-4th at Kiel 1922, took 3rd at Wiesbaden 1925 (Quadrangular, Max Euwe won), and took 2nd, behind Berthold Koch, at Berlin 1929. His last tournament was at Bad Pyrmont 1933 (the 1st German Championship, Efim Bogoljubow won) in which he was the oldest participating master, and took 15th place.
