= Adolphe Wahltuch =

English physician and chess writer

Adolphe Wahltuch MD LRCP
- Born: 19 May 1837; Odessa, Kherson Governorate, Russian Empire
- Died: 25 November 1907 (aged 70); Rusholme, Manchester, United Kingdom
- Education: University of Kiev
- Spouse: Anna Goldschmidt (m. 1866)
- Relatives: Victor Wahltuch (son)
- Medical career
- Institutions: Victoria Jewish Hospital; Hulme Dispensary
- Notable works: A Dictionary of Materia Medica and Therapeutics (1868)

Adolphe Wahltuch LRCP (19 May 1837, Odessa – 25 November 1907, Manchester) was a Russian-born English physician and chess writer. He was known as a successful practitioner and as a prolific writer of medical works.

== Biography ==
Wahltuch was born into a Jewish family in Odessa. He received his M.D. from the University of Kiev in 1860, whereupon he practised for about two years in his native city, and then went to Prague to obtain better clinical experience. At Prague he was a fellow student of Morell Mackenzie. From there, Wahltuch came to London, where he qualified as L.R.C.P. at the Middlesex Hospital in 1863.

Wahltuch then settled in Manchester as a practising physician. He would come to serve as consulting physician of Manchester's Victoria Jewish Hospital, honorary physician of the Hulme Dispensary, and president of the Manchester Clinical Society and of the Manchester Medico-Ethical Association. He was one of the founders of the Manchester Cremation Society, and was a frequent lecturer on hygiene and on scientific and historical subjects.

An avid chess player, Wahltuch edited the chess column in the Manchester Weekly Times, and founded several chess clubs in the city. His son, Victor Wahltuch, would become a well-known chess master.

He died at his residence at Rusholme, Manchester, on 25 November 1907. He was survived by his wife, Anna (née Goldschmidt), and seven children.

== Bibliography ==
- A Dictionary of Materia Medica and Therapeutics. London: John Churchill & Sons. 1868.
- On Catalepsy. Read before the medical section of the Manchester Royal Institution (Pamphlet). London: John Churchill & Sons. 1869.
- Wahltuch, Adolphe (15 September 1877). "Cases of Asthma Nervosum. Successfully and Permanently Cured with Arsenic-Inhalations and Galvanisation of the Pneumogastric Nerves". The British Medical Journal. 2 (872). Manchester: 376–377. doi:10.1136/bmj.2.872.376. JSTOR 25245484. PMC 2220990. PMID 20748624.
- Wahltuch, Adolphe (29 September 1883). "Electro-Therapeutics". The British Medical Journal. 2 (1187). London: 623–634. JSTOR 25264209.
- Wahltuch, Adolphe (2 January 1886). "Violinist's Cramp Treated Successfully By Electricity". The British Medical Journal. 1 (1305). London: 11. doi:10.1136/bmj.1.1305.11. JSTOR 25274531. PMC 2256682. PMID 20751411.
- The Dead and the Living. Earth Burial One of the Causes of High Mortality. Manchester: John Heywood. 1891.
- Treatment of Diseases by Energy. Manchester. 1900.
