= Victor Wahltuch =

British chess player

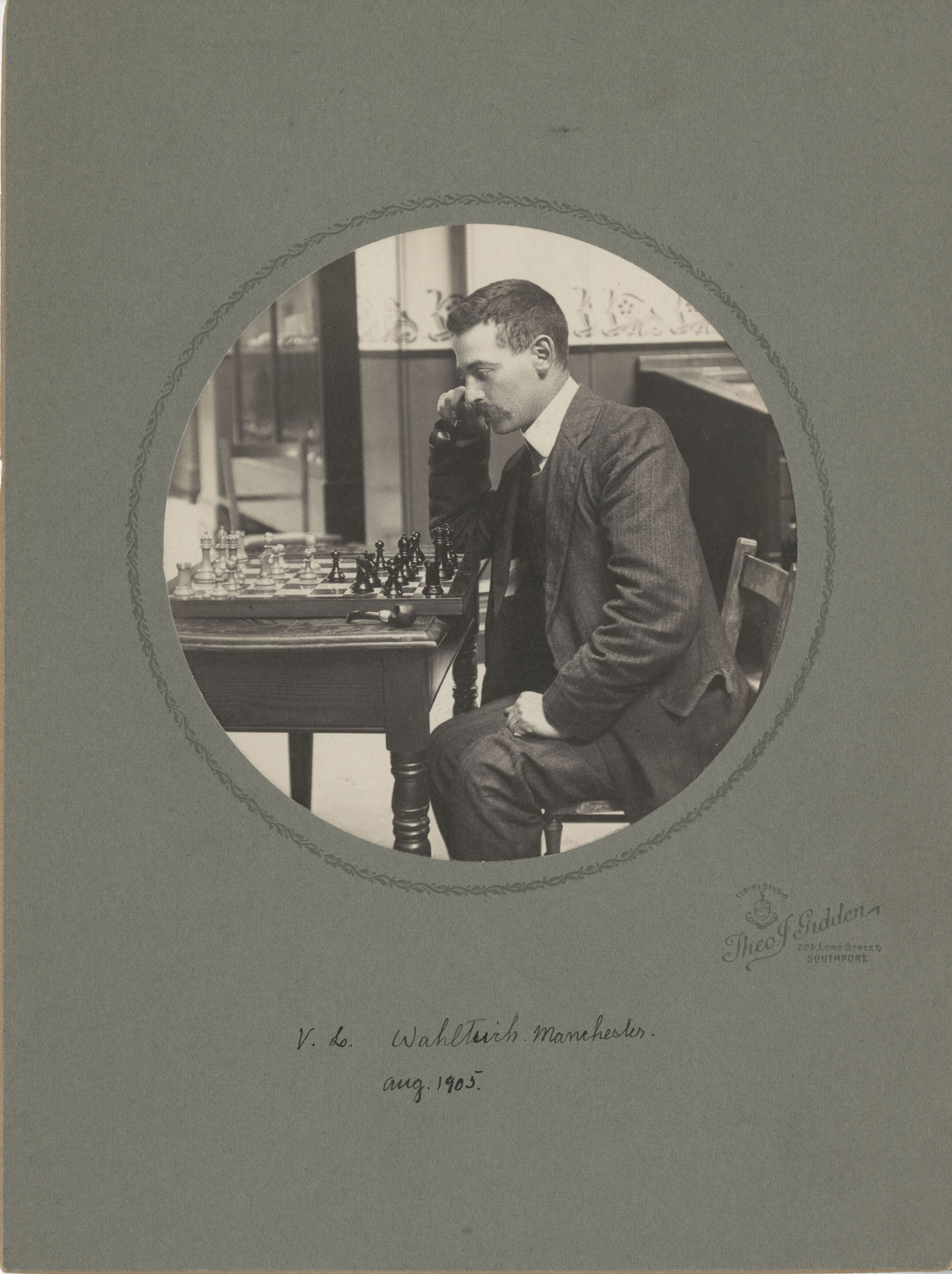
Wahltuch in August 1905

Victor Leonard Wahltuch (24 May 1875 in Manchester – 27 August 1953 in London) was an English chess master.

He was the son of prominent Manchester physician Adolphe Wahltuch.

Wahltuch shared 1st with George Shories at Blackpool 1907, won at Blackpool 1908, tied for 3rd-4th at Blackpool 1910 (Frederick Yates won), and tied for 9-10th at Richmond 1912 (British Championship, Richard Griffith won).

After World War I, he tied for 5-6th at Hastings 1919 (José Raúl Capablanca won), shared 1st with Yates and won a play-off match with him (3 : 1) at Manchester 1921, tied for 12-13th at London 1922 (Capablanca won), took 7th at Liverpool 1923 (Jacques Mieses won), tied for 13-14th at London 1924 (George Alan Thomas won), shared 8th at the Hastings International Chess Congress 1925/26 (Alexander Alekhine and Milan Vidmar won), tied for 4-6th at Scarborough 1927 (Edgard Colle won), and took 4th at Scarborough 1929 (Harold Saunders and Savielly Tartakower won).

Wahltuch played for England in the 4th Chess Olympiad at Prague 1931.
