= Lajos Steiner =

Hungarian-born Australian chess player

Lajos Stiener
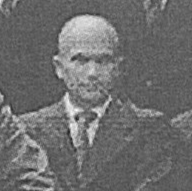
- Lajos Stiener in 1936
- Born: June 14, 1903; Nagyvárad (Oradea)
- Died: April 22, 1975 (aged 71); Sydney (1975)
- Occupation: Mathematics teacher
- Title: International Master

Lajos Steiner (14 June 1903, in Nagyvárad (Oradea) – 22 April 1975, in Sydney) was a Hungarian–born Australian chess master.

Steiner was one of four children of Bernat Steiner, a mathematics teacher, and his wife Cecilia (née Schwarz). His elder brother was Endre Steiner. He was educated at the Technical High School in Budapest, and graduated in 1926 with a diploma in mechanical engineering from the Technikum Mittweida in Germany.

In 1923, he tied for 4-5th in Vienna. In 1925 he took 2nd, behind Sándor Takács, in Budapest. In 1927, he won in Schandau and tied for 2nd-3rd in Kecskemét. In 1927/28, he took 2nd. In 1929, he took 2nd in Bradley Beach. In 1931, he won in Budapest (HUN-ch), took 5th in Vienna, and tied for 5-6th in Berlin. The event was won by Herman Steiner. In 1932/33, he tied for 3rd-4th in Hastings (Salo Flohr won). In 1933, he tied for 2nd-3rd in Maehrisch-Ostrau (Ostrava). The event was won by Ernst Grünfeld. In 1933, he took 4th in Budapest.

In 1934, he tied for 1st-2nd with Vasja Pirc in Maribor (Marburg). In 1935, he tied for 1st-2nd with Erich Eliskases in Vienna (the 18th Trebitsch Memorial). In 1935, he tied for 5-6th in Łódź (Savielly Tartakower won) and took 4th in Tatatovaros (László Szabó won). In 1936, he won, with Mieczysław Najdorf, in Budapest (HUN-ch). In 1937, he took 2nd in Brno (Brunn), and took 3rd in Zoppot (Sopot). In 1937/38, he won in Vienna (the 20th Trebitsch Memorial). In 1938, he tied for 3rd-4th in Ljubljana (Laibach). The event was won by Borislav Kostić. In 1938, he tied for 8-9th in Łódź where Pirc won.

Lajos Steiner played a few matches. In 1930, he lost (+3 –5 =2) to Isaac Kashdan. In 1934, he won (+7 –3) against Pál Réthy. In 1935, he won (+3 –1) vs Henri Grob.

He played for Hungary in four Chess Olympiads:

- In 1931, he played at second board at 4th Chess Olympiad in Prague (+10 –3 =4).
- In 1933, he played at second board at 5th Chess Olympiad in Folkestone (+5 –4 =5).
- In 1935, he played at first board at 6th Chess Olympiad in Warsaw (+7 –4 =7).
- In 1936, he played at second board at 3rd unofficial Chess Olympiad in Munich (+13 –2 =5).

He won individual bronze medal in Prague, and team gold medal and individual silver medal in Munich.

Steiner emigrated to Australia in 1939. He won the Australian Chess Championship four times in 1945, 1946/47, 1952/53, and 1958/59. He also won nine of his ten attempts at the New South Wales title (1940–41, 1943, 1944, 1945–46, 1953, 1955, 1958). He took 3rd in Karlovy Vary – Mariánské Lázně in 1948. The event was won by Jan Foltys. He took 19th at the 1st Interzonal Tournament in Saltsjöbaden in 1948. The event was won by David Bronstein.

He was awarded the International Master (IM) title in 1950.

== See also ==
- List of Jewish chess players
