= Leopold Trebitsch Memorial Tournament =

Leopold Trebitsch Memorial Tournament was a chess competition organized by the family of Austrian silk manufacturer Leopold Trebitsch. Twenty tournaments were played in Vienna between 1907 and 1938.

Wealthy industrialist Leopold Trebitsch (1842–1906) was a lover of chess and a patron of chess competitions. His family advanced the considerable sum of 100,000 kronen to the Vienna Chess Club to organize a series of tournaments. Since Trebitsch died one month before the start of the first tournament, the competitions were named in his memory. Six of the first nine events (1907–1918) were won by Carl Schlechter, but his death in December 1918, along with the loss of the Club's Trebitsch fund in the aftermath of Austria's debacle in World War I, put a temporary halt to the tournament. In 1926, Leopold Trebitsch's son, Oskar, made more funds available, enabling eleven additional competitions to be held until 1938, when Germany's annexation of Austria ended the event.

== Winners ==
#	Year	Winner
1	1907	Jacques Mieses (German Empire) / Saxony
2	1909/10	Richard Réti (Austria-Hungary) / Slovakia
3	1910/11	Carl Schlechter (Austria-Hungary) / Austria
4	1911/12	Carl Schlechter (Austria-Hungary) / Austria
5	1913	Carl Schlechter (Austria-Hungary) / Austria
6	1914	Carl Schlechter (Austria-Hungary) / Austria
7	1915	Carl Schlechter (Austria-Hungary) / Austria
8	1916/17	Carl Schlechter (Austria-Hungary) / Austria
9	1917/18	Milan Vidmar (Austria-Hungary) / Slovenia
10	1926	Rudolf Spielmann (Austria)
11	1927	Ernst Grünfeld (Austria)
12	1928	Ernst Grünfeld (Austria); Sándor Takács (Hungary)
13	1929/30	Rudolf Spielmann (Austria); Hans Kmoch (Austria)
14	1931	Albert Becker (Austria)
15	1932	Albert Becker (Austria)
16	1933	Ernst Grünfeld (Austria); Hans Müller (Austria)
17	1934/35	Albert Becker (Austria)
18	1935	Erich Eliskases (Austria); Lajos Steiner (Hungary)
19	1936	Henryk Friedman (Poland)
20	1937/38	Lajos Steiner (Hungary)
