= Louis van Vliet =

Dutch chess master

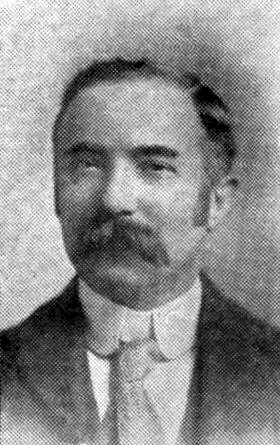
Louis van Vliet

Louis Moses (Mozes) van Vliet (17 August 1854, Amsterdam – 15 June 1932, London) was a Dutch chess master.

== Personal life ==
Van Vliet was the son of Annaatje Philip van Cleef of Amsterdam and Moses van Vliet, a tailor and merchant originally from Rotterdam. His father died in November 1865 and his mother in June 1868, and as a 13-year-old orphan he moved to England to live with his uncle Edward van Vliet. Another uncle, Eliazer Lion "Leon" van Vliet, was a pawnbroker in San Francisco and Louis moved there in 1884 at the age of 29. He apparently only learned chess from Leon and started playing tournaments. In 1887, when he was considered the "best player of the Pacific Coast", he moved back to London. In 1889 he came to Amsterdam to play his first international tournament, but he remained living in London for the rest of his life.

== Chess ==
He took 4th at Amsterdam 1889 (Amos Burn won), 6–8th at London 1889 (Henry Edward Bird won), took 19th at Manchester 1890 (the 6th British Chess Federation Congress, Siegbert Tarrasch won), took 2nd, behind Rudolf Loman, at London 1891, took 10th at London 1891 (Bird won), took 9th at London 1892 (Emanuel Lasker won), took 5th at London 1893 (Joseph Henry Blackburne won), tied for 2nd–3rd at London 1896 (Richard Teichmann won).

He tied for 3rd–4th and took 5th at London 1900 (Teichmann won), took 6th (William Ewart Napier won) and 5th at London 1904 (Teichmann won), tied for 27–28th at Ostend 1907 (B tournament, Ossip Bernstein and Akiba Rubinstein won). Louis van Vliet lost the only game played with Dr. Walter Romain Lovegrove in London in 1912.

His most notable win was a 24-move victory over Emanuel Lasker at Amsterdam 1889. Within less than a year, Lasker would be ranked No. 1 in the world for the next twelve years, according to the website Chessmetrics.com. Van Vliet's best known loss came against Aron Nimzowitsch at Ostend 1907. Nimzowitsch annotated it for his work The Blockade and—with revised annotations—his work Chess Praxis, where Nimzowitsch pointed out a positional queen sacrifice that van Vliet could have played that Nimzowitsch believed would have allowed van Vliet to hold a draw. But even this would not have saved van Vliet, as indicated by modern chess engines.
