= Sándor Takács =

Hungarian chess player

Sándor Takács (10 February 1893 – 22 April 1932) was a Hungarian chess master, born Károly Sydlauer in Miskolc, Hungary.

== Career ==
In 1922, Takács took 13th in Vienna (Akiba Rubinstein won). In 1924, he took 6th in Meran (Ernst Grünfeld won). In 1925, Takács won, ahead of Lajos Steiner, in Budapest. In 1926, he tied for 3rd-5th in Budapest (1st FIDE tournament, Mario Monticelli and Grünfeld won). In 1927, he took 8th in Vienna (Grünfeld won). In 1927, he took 5th in Kecskemét (Alexander Alekhine won). In 1928, he tied for 1st-2nd with Grünfeld in Vienna.

At Hastings 1928/29, Takács tied for 1st-3rd, with Frank Marshall and Edgard Colle. In 1929, he tied for 3rd-5th in Rogaška Slatina (Rohitsch-Sauerbrunn), an event won by Rubinstein, whom Takacs defeated in their individual game. In 1929/30, he tied for 4-7th in Hastings (José Raúl Capablanca won). In 1930, he tied for 2nd-3rd with Daniël Noteboom, behind Savielly Tartakower, in Rotterdam (Quadrangular). In 1930, he tied for 2nd-3rd with Arthur Dunkelblum, behind Salo Flohr, in Antwerp.

Takács played for Hungary at second board (+6 –3 =5) in the 3rd Chess Olympiad at Hamburg 1930, as the team won the silver medal.

== Death ==
Takács died in Budapest in 1932.
