= Daniël Noteboom =

Dutch chess player

Daniël Noteboom (26 February 1910 – 12 January 1932) was a Dutch chess player. He gained notice at the 1930 Chess Olympiad at Hamburg, scoring 11½/15, including a win against Salo Flohr.

== Chess biography ==
Noteboom was born in Noordwijk. He learned to play chess at the age of 12, and at 14 won a local tournament in Noordwijk. At the age of 15 he was admitted to the Leiden Chess Society, following a special dispensation from the secretary of the club – at the time chess clubs were generally reserved for adult men with social standing and he was supposed to be too young to be included. In the next few years he won the championship of the club three times.

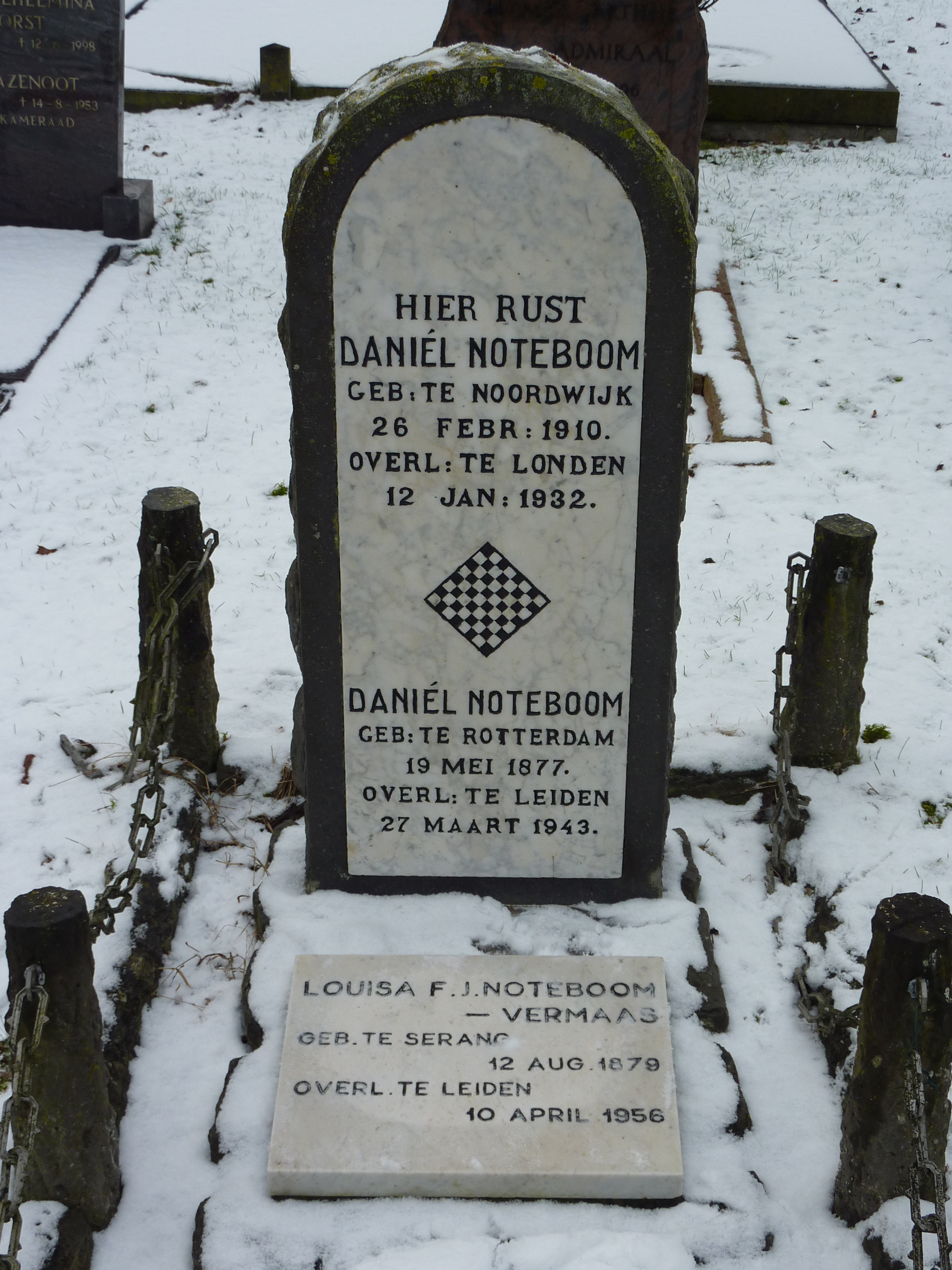
Noteboom's grave in Noordwijk

After playing at Hastings 1931/2, he soon died of pneumonia in London at age 21, ending a brief but promising chess career.

== Legacy ==
Noteboom Variation
Position: a8 black rook, b8 black knight, d8 black queen, e8 black king, g8 black knight, h8 black rook, b7 black bishop, f7 black pawn, g7 black pawn, h7 black pawn, e6 black pawn, a5 black pawn, b5 black pawn, c4 black pawn, d4 white pawn, b3 white pawn, c3 white bishop, e3 white pawn, f3 white knight, f2 white pawn, g2 white pawn, h2 white pawn, a1 white rook, d1 white queen, e1 white king, f1 white bishop, h1 white rook
- Moves: 1.d4 d5 2.c4 e6 3.Nc3 c6 4.Nf3 dxc4 5.a4 Bb4 6.e3 b5 7.Bd2 a5 8.axb5 Bxc3 9.Bxc3 cxb5 10.b3 Bb7
- ECO: D31
- Named after: Daniël Noteboom
- Parent: QGD Semi-Slav
- Synonyms: Abrahams Defence; Abrahams–Noteboom Variation

A chess opening variation related to the Semi-Slav Defence to the Queen's Gambit is the Noteboom Variation: 1.d4 d5 2.c4 e6 3.Nc3 c6 4.Nf3 dxc4, with a common continuation being 5.a4 Bb4 6.e3 b5 7.Bd2 a5 8.axb5 Bxc3 9.Bxc3 cxb5 10.b3 Bb7. It is also known as the Abrahams Defence after the late English master Gerald Abrahams.
