= Ernst Grünfeld =

Austrian chess grandmaster (1893–1962)

Ernst Franz Grünfeld
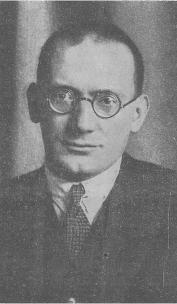

Personal information
- Born: Ernst Franz Grünfeld; November 21, 1893 Josefstadt, Vienna, Austria-Hungary
- Died: April 3, 1962 (aged 68) Ottakring, Vienna, Austria

Chess career
- Country: Austria
- Title: Grandmaster (1950)

Ernst Franz Grünfeld (November 21, 1893 – April 3, 1962) was an Austrian chess player and writer, mainly on opening theory. He was among the inaugural recipients of the grandmaster title in 1950.

== Life and career ==
Grünfeld was born in Josefstadt, Vienna. He lost a leg in his early childhood, which was beset by poverty. However, he discovered chess, studied intensely, and quickly earned a reputation as a skilled player at the local chess club, the Vienna Chess Club.

The First World War (1914–1918) seriously affected Grünfeld's chances of playing the best in the world as few tournaments were played during this troubled period. He was reduced to playing correspondence matches and spent much of his spare time studying opening variations. He started a library of chess material which he kept in his small Viennese flat until his death at the age of 68 in 1962.

He developed a reputation as an expert on openings during the 1920s and success over the board soon followed. He was 1st in Vienna (1920) with Savielly Tartakower; 1st in Margate (1923); 1st in Merano (1924); 1st in Budapest (1926) with Mario Monticelli; 1st in Vienna (1927) and he shared first spot in the Vienna tournaments of 1928 and 1933 (Trebitsch Memorial)—the former with Sándor Takács and the latter with Hans Müller; and finally he was 1st in the tournament at Ostrava of 1933. He also won in the 23rd DSB Congress at Frankfurt 1923.

During the Bad Pistyan (Piešťany) tournament of April 1922 Grünfeld introduced his most important contribution to opening theory—the Grünfeld Defence. He played the defence against Friedrich Sämisch in round 7, drawing in 22 moves, and later that year he used it successfully against Alexander Alekhine in the Vienna tournament. However, he did not play the opening frequently.

During the late 1920s and 1930s Grünfeld played top board for Austria in four Chess Olympiads (1927, 1931, 1933, 1935), and his best year was in 1927 when he scored 9½/12. According to the Chessmetrics website he would have been rated around 2715 at his peak in December 1924.

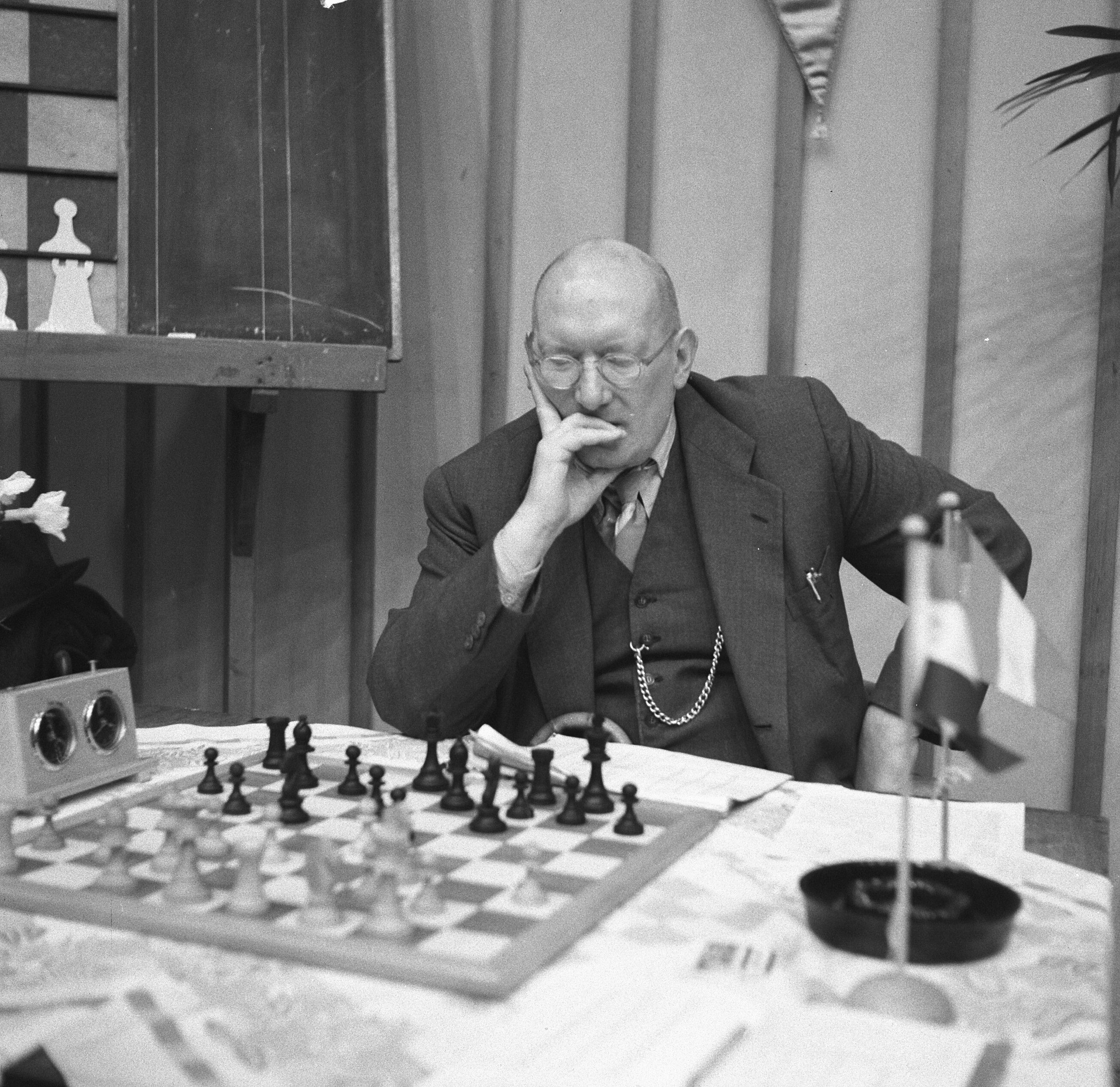
Grünfeld (Wijk aan Zee, 1961)

In May 1943, he took 2nd, behind Paul Keres, in Poznań, and won in December 1943 in Vienna. After the Second World War, he tied for 3rd-4th at Vienna 1951 (Schlechter Memorial, Moshe Czerniak won). Grünfeld was awarded the title International Grandmaster by FIDE in 1950. By the late 1950s he was playing very little chess and he mainly worked on his prodigious library which by now had completely filled the living room in his flat which he shared with his wife and daughter. His last tournament was Beverwijk (Hoogovens Tournament) in 1961, where in a field with five more strong grandmasters, he finished with a score of 3/9 (with only one win, against Jan Hein Donner).

He died in Vienna on April 3, 1962.

== Playing style ==
He reputedly modeled his style of play on Akiba Rubinstein's and only played 1.d4, claiming that he did not make mistakes in the opening. He generally focused more on his opening play, rather than developing complex tactics.

He is best remembered for his eponymous defence, the Grünfeld Defence (1.d4 Nf6 2.c4 g6 3.Nc3 d5) and for his general expertise in the opening.

== Writings ==
Ernst Grünfeld contributed many articles on openings to chess magazines around Europe. Indeed, before he had turned 20, he was already contributing articles on the Ruy Lopez to Wiener Schachzeitung, which was one of the most popular German-language chess publications of its day, and over the next 40 years or so he wrote many articles on opening theory for chess publications in Germany, Belgium, and the USSR. Since the bulk of his writing consisted of chess notations rather than words, the articles could be easily translated into different languages. In particular, Bulgaria proved to be a steady market, where Grünfeld was paid in food rather than money for his articles.

He published several books which were generally well received and he contributed to a seminal account of the Teplice tournament of 1922. Other publications include The Queen's Pawn Game and the Queen's Gambit Declined (1924) and Taschenbuch der Eroffnungen im Schach (1953).
