= Jacques Mieses =

German-British chess grandmaster (1865–1954)

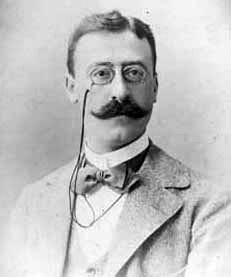
- Jacques Mieses, 1900

Personal information
- Born: Jacob Mieses; 27 February 1865 Leipzig, Kingdom of Saxony
- Died: 23 February 1954 (aged 88) London, United Kingdom

Chess career
- Country: Germany; United Kingdom
- Title: Grandmaster (1950)

Jacques Mieses (born Jacob Mieses; 27 February 1865 – 23 February 1954) was a German chess player. Mieses, who was Jewish, fled the Nazi regime in 1938 and later became a British citizen.^{p258} He was one of the inaugural recipients of the title International Grandmaster from FIDE in 1950.

== Chess career ==
Born Jacob Mieses in Leipzig, Kingdom of Saxony in 1865, his early tournament successes included a tie for second with Bardeleben and von Gottschall behind Siegbert Tarrasch at the 2nd Bavarian Chess Congress in Nuremberg (August 1888) and a third place behind Bardeleben and Riemann at the 40th anniversary tournament of the Leipzig chess society Augustea (December 1888), where he defeated Tarrasch with the white pieces in the opening round. He was quickly eclipsed, however, by two rising young superstars, Emanuel Lasker and Siegbert Tarrasch. Mieses attained maturity as a player in 1895, just after turning 30, when he contested the 9th Chess Congress in Leipzig, followed by an exhibition tour in Russia and then a match with David Janowski. His participation in the great Hastings tournament that year was important to his growth as a chess master despite a 20th-place finish.

Mieses was a dangerous attacker with a number of famous victories to his credit, e.g. against Frank Marshall (Monte Carlo 1903). His best achievement was to win the first Trebitsch Memorial at Vienna 1907, and he came third at the 28-round Masters tournament at Ostend the same year.

He organized the 1911 San Sebastian master tournament and insisted that all the masters' expenses were paid. This was the first international tournament of José Raúl Capablanca, who surprised everyone by winning.

In March and April 1923, Mieses won the NCCU Premier Tournament at Liverpool with 8 points from 9 games, ahead of Géza Maróczy and the British masters Frederick Yates and Sir George Alan Thomas.

Mieses, now past the age of 70, settled in England in 1938 following Kristallnacht in Germany, and arrived with just 15 Reichsmarks in his pocket. He continued to actively play chess and participated in his last major event at Hastings 1946, when he was 80 years old and half a century after Hastings 1895. The octogenarian Mieses won only a single game against a 22-year-old opponent, but secured the brilliancy prize for a game-winning attack combination. Three years later, at 84, he defeated the 86-year-old Dutch master Dirk van Foreest, afterwards commenting "Youth has been victorious" and also gave a series of exhibition matches in western Europe. When FIDE instituted the grandmaster title in 1950, Mieses was one of the 27 original recipients and, at 85, the oldest among them. As a naturalised British citizen registered with the British Chess Federation, he was the first British grandmaster, a title later also associated with Tony Miles, who in 1976 became the first English-born grandmaster. He died in February 1954, a few days before his 89th birthday.

Mieses's professional chess career lasted 64 years, a record that still stands as of 2018. His durability at an advanced age was attributed to his belief in physical fitness; he engaged in daily swims until almost the end of his life.

Mieses wrote many tournament reports, but his style was regarded as fairly dry, in contrast with his wittiness in person.

== Legacy ==
Mieses largely adhered to the 19th-century Romantic school of play and showed little aptitude for positional chess. He used almost exclusively e4 openings and he was the last chess master of note to make any serious use of the Center Game and Vienna Game. On the Black side of an e4 opening, he generally used the French Defense or Sicilian Defense. The Queen's Gambit and Dutch Defense were his usual replies to d4 openings.

He often used the Scandinavian Defense and greatly developed its theory in the early 1900s. The chess opening 1.d3 is named the Mieses Opening. He is also known for the Mieses Variation of the Vienna Game, which runs 1.e4 e5 2.Nc3 Nf6 (or 2...Nc6) 3.g3. Its king bishop fianchetto can be seen as an early example of hypermodernism. There is also a line in the Scotch Game named the Mieses Variation (1.e4 e5 2.Nf3 Nc6 3.d4 exd4 4.Nxd4 Nf6 5.Nxc6 bxc6 6.e5) after he employed it four times at Hastings 1895.^{p213}

== See also ==
- List of Jewish chess players
