= Gyula Breyer =

Hungarian chess player (1893–1921)

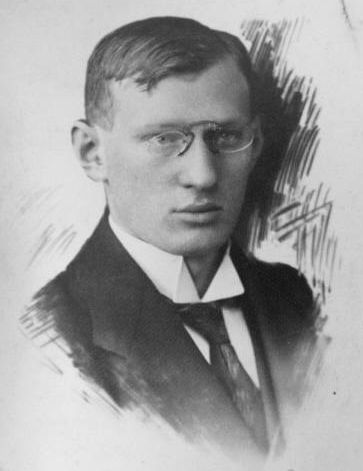

Personal information
- Born: 30 April 1893 Budapest, Hungary
- Died: 9 November 1921 (aged 28) Bratislava, Czechoslovakia

Chess career
- Country: Hungary

Gyula "Julius" Breyer (30 April 1893 Budapest – 9 November 1921) was a Hungarian chess player and 1912 Hungarian national champion.

== Chess career ==
In 1912, Breyer won the Hungarian championship in Temesvar. In a 1920 tournament in Berlin, he finished first (+6−2=1) ahead of Efim Bogoljubow, Savielly Tartakower, Richard Réti, Géza Maróczy, and Siegbert Tarrasch. Breyer had a plus record against Max Euwe (later world champion).

In 1921, Breyer set a new blindfold chess record by playing 25 games simultaneously. He also edited Szellemi Sport, a magazine devoted to chess puzzles, and composed at least one retrograde analysis study.

Heart disease cut short Breyer's promising chess career. He died in 1921 at the age of 28 in Bratislava. He was buried in Bratislava and after exhumation in 1987, was reburied in the Kerepesi Cemetery in Budapest.

== Legacy ==
Breyer was a leading pioneer of the hypermodern school of chess theory, which favoured controlling the centre with pressure from the flanks. He was a friend of Richard Réti and an inspiration to other players.

Position: a8 black rook, c8 black bishop, d8 black queen, f8 black rook, g8 black king, c7 black pawn, d7 black knight, e7 black bishop, f7 black pawn, g7 black pawn, h7 black pawn, a6 black pawn, d6 black pawn, f6 black knight, b5 black pawn, e5 black pawn, d4 white pawn, e4 white pawn, b3 white bishop, c3 white pawn, f3 white knight, h3 white pawn, a2 white pawn, b2 white pawn, f2 white pawn, g2 white pawn, a1 white rook, b1 white knight, c1 white bishop, d1 white queen, e1 white rook, g1 white king

Ruy Lopez Breyer Variation after 9...Nb8 10.d4 Nbd7

He is most notably recognised for the Breyer Variation in the Ruy Lopez, which involves Black re-routing his queen's knight to d7 for increased flexibility (1.e4 e5 2.Nf3 Nc6 3.Bb5 a6 4.Ba4 Nf6 5.0-0 Be7 6.Re1 b5 7.Bb3 0-0 8.c3 d6 9.h3 Nb8 10.d4 Nbd7; see diagram). This line became fashionable in the 1960s, and a favourite of ex-world champion Boris Spassky. He is also recognised for the Breyer Variation of the Vienna Gambit (1.e4 e5 2.Nc3 Nf6 3.f4 d5 4.fxe5 Nxe4 5.Nf3 Be7), as well as the Breyer Gambit (1.e4 e5 2.f4 exf4 3.Qf3), a variation of the King's Gambit. He was an early adopter of the Slav Defense (1.d4 d5 2.c4 c6) at a time when the Queen's Gambit Declined (2...e6) was Black's most common response to the Queen's Gambit, and is credited with the Breyer Variation of the Slav (1.d4 d5 2.c4 c6 3.Nf3 Nf6 4.Nbd2).

== Notable games ==
Max Euwe vs. Breyer, Vienna 1921
1.e4 Nc6 2.Nc3 Nf6 3.d4 e5 4.dxe5 Nxe5 5.f4 Nc6 6.e5 Ng8 7.Bc4 d6 8.Nf3 Bg4 9.0-0 Qd7 10.Qe1 0-0-0 11.Ng5 dxe5 12.Kh1 f6 13.Nf7 Na5 14.Nxd8 Nxc4 15.Qe4 Nd6 16.Qb4 Be7 17.fxe5 fxe5 18.Nxb7 Nxb7 19.Rf8+ Bxf8 20.Qxf8+ Qd8 21.Qxg7 Nf6 22.Bg5 Rg8 23.Qh6 Rg6 24.Qh4 Nd6 25.Rf1 Nf5 26.Qxg4 Nxg4 27.Bxd8 Nge3 28.Rf3 Kxd8 29.h3 Rg3 30.Rxg3 Nxg3+ 0–1
