= Hypermodernism (chess) =

School of chess that emerged after World War I

Position: a8 black rook, b8 black knight, c8 black bishop, d8 black queen, e8 black king, f8 black bishop, h8 black rook, a7 black pawn, c7 black pawn, d7 black pawn, f7 black pawn, g7 black pawn, h7 black pawn, b6 black pawn, e6 black pawn, f6 black knight, c4 white pawn, d4 white pawn, f3 white knight, a2 white pawn, b2 white pawn, e2 white pawn, f2 white pawn, g2 white pawn, h2 white pawn, a1 white rook, b1 white knight, c1 white bishop, d1 white queen, e1 white king, f1 white bishop, h1 white rook

The Queen's Indian Defence, controlling the central e4-square with pieces, not pawns, is a hypermodern opening for Black.

Hypermodernism is a school of chess that emerged after World War I. It featured challenges to the chess ideas of central European masters, including Wilhelm Steinitz's approach to the centre and the rules established by Siegbert Tarrasch. The ground principle of hypermodernism is the idea that one should control the center of the chess board indirectly with pieces, rather than occupying that area with pawns.

== Overview ==
Hypermodernists demonstrated their new ideas with games and victories. Aron Nimzowitsch, considered the founder and leading practitioner of hypermodernism, showed that games could be won through indirect control of the centre, breaking with Tarrasch's view that the centre must be occupied by pawns. Nimzowitsch advocated controlling the centre with distant pieces rather than with pawns, thus inviting the opponent to occupy the centre with pawns, which can then become targets of attack. This was part of the hypermodern framework, which Nimzowitsch encapsulated in his book My System, which greatly influenced many chess players. It introduced and formalised concepts of the pawn chain, overprotection, undermining, prophylaxis, restraint, rook on the seventh rank, knight outposts, the dynamics of the isolated queen's pawn, and other areas of chess.

Although none of the primary exponents of the Hypermodern school ever achieved the title of World Chess Champion, they were among the world's strongest players. World Champion Alexander Alekhine was associated with hypermodernism, but his style was more of a blend with the Classical school.

In practice, hypermodernism has not replaced the classical theory of Steinitz and Tarrasch. Instead, modern chess textbooks describe hypermodernism as an addition, or extension, to classical theory.

Hypermodern openings include the Réti Opening, King's Indian Defence, Queen's Indian Defence, Nimzo-Indian Defence, Nimzowitsch Defence, Grünfeld Defence, Bogo-Indian Defence, Old Indian Defence, Catalan Opening, King's Indian Attack, Alekhine's Defence, Modern Defence, Pirc Defence, Larsen's Opening, and to a lesser degree the English Opening.

== History ==
Howard Staunton and many of his 19th-century contemporaries understood various ideas associated with hypermodernism. The Hypermodern school of chess theory came to prominence in the 1920s. Leading members were Aron Nimzowitsch, Richard Réti, Savielly Tartakower, Gyula Breyer, Efim Bogoljubov, and Ernst Grünfeld, who all came from Central Europe. They felt that chess was becoming boring, slow, and not worthwhile. They also believed that chess could not be defined by a simple set of laws or principles, such as those laid out by Siegbert Tarrasch.

Their ideas were thus a challenge to the existing orthodoxy popularised by Tarrasch in the 1890s. This orthodoxy was a rather dogmatic distillation of the ideas worked out by chess pioneer Wilhelm Steinitz. Steinitz was the first player who in his play demonstrated a mastery of positional chess, and the ideas he developed came to be known as the "Classical" or "Modern" school of thought. This school of thought emphasised the importance of "static" advantages such as avoidance of pawn weaknesses, strong outposts for knights, and striving for "good" rather than "bad" bishops in positions with locked pawn structures. This school of thought was in turn a reaction to the earlier swashbuckling style of Adolf Anderssen, Henry Blackburne, and others, who represented the Romantic school.

In 1922, Réti published Die neuen Ideen im Schachspiel (English: The New Ideas in Chess), an examination of the evolution of chess thinking from the time of Paul Morphy through the beginning of the Hypermodern school. The name "hypermodern" was originated by Tartakower; his book Die hypermoderne Schachpartie (English: The Hypermodern Chess Game) was published in 1924. Nimzowitsch's book Mein System (English: My System) was published in 1925 through to 1927 in five installments. It discusses elements of hypermodernism, but focuses mainly on positional chess.

=== New developments ===
At a time when many top players, such as Emanuel Lasker and José Raúl Capablanca, feared that the increasingly refined positional technique might lead to a draw death, the hypermodern movement, together with the dynamic style of Alexander Alekhine, broadened the strategic possibilities available to master players and contributed to major developments in chess theory during 1920s. This period in chess history developed alongside the cultural and artistic dynamism of the Roaring Twenties. In this creative spirit, the period also witnessed the development and popularisation of numerous new opening systems, particularly the Indian Defences and other hypermodern openings that reshaped opening theory.
