= San Remo 1930 chess tournament =

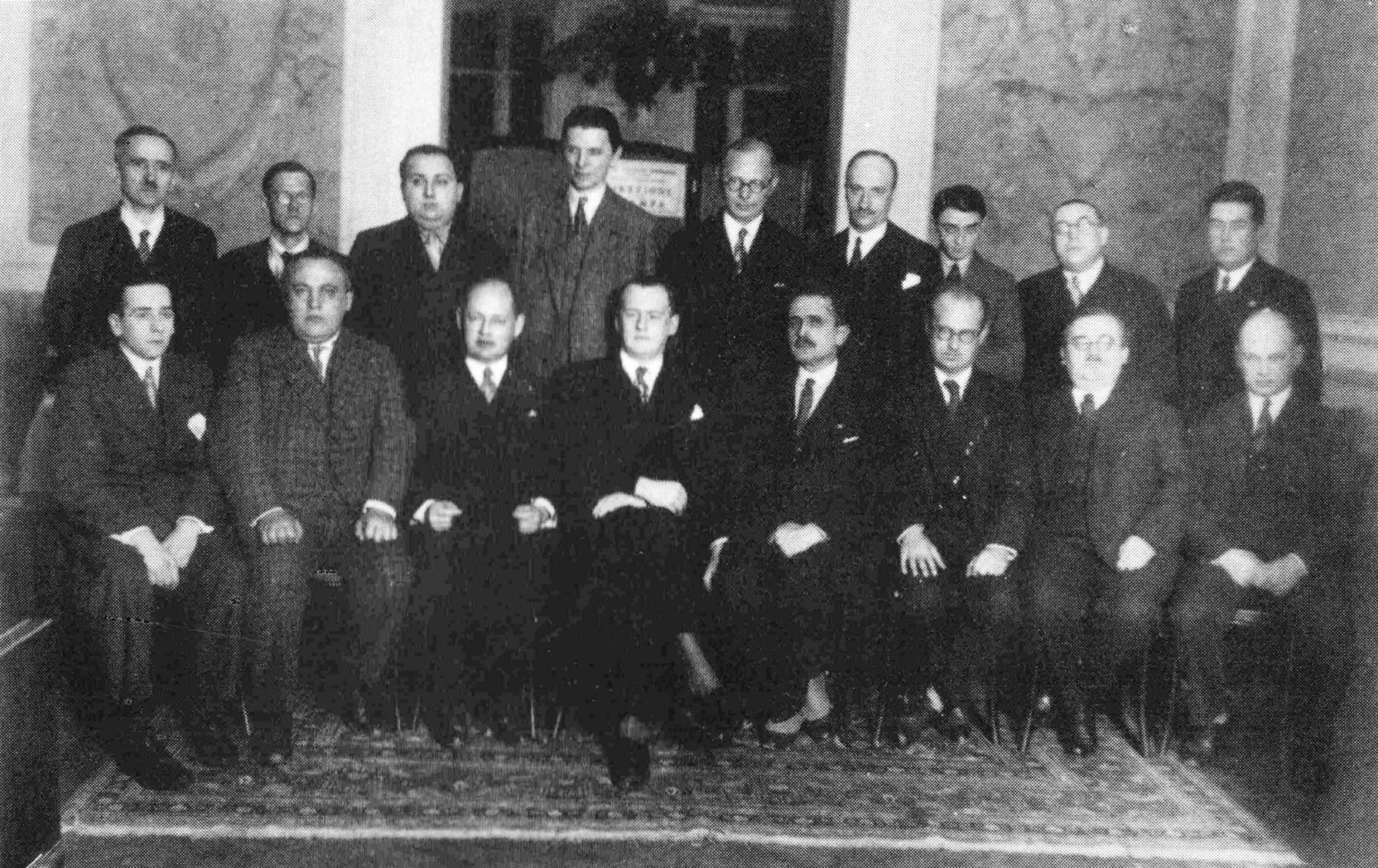

San Remo 1930 was the first international chess tournament held in the Sanremo Casino. Sixteen chess masters including the world champion Alexander Alekhine, played a round-robin tournament from 16 January to 4 February 1930. The games were played in the casino during the day, and in the evening the playing hall was used for dancing.

Alekhine dominated the field with a score of 14/15, 3½ points ahead of second-placed Aron Nimzowitsch, and won 10,000 lire.

The final standings and crosstable:

San Remo 1930
#	Player	1	2	3	4	5	6	7	8	9	10	11	12	13	14	15	16	Total
1	Alexander Alekhine (France)	x	1	1	½	1	1	½	1	1	1	1	1	1	1	1	1	14
2	Aron Nimzowitsch (Denmark)	0	x	0	1	½	1	½	½	½	½	1	1	1	1	1	1	10½
3	Akiba Rubinstein (Poland)	0	1	x	0	1	½	0	1	½	1	1	0	1	1	1	1	10
4	Efim Bogoljubow (Germany)	½	0	1	x	½	0	1	½	1	1	0	1	1	0	1	1	9½
5	Fred Yates (England)	0	0	½	½	x	½	1	1	½	0	0	1	1	1	1	1	9
6	Carl Ahues (Germany)	0	0	½	1	½	x	1	½	1	0	0	½	1	1	½	1	8½
7-8	Rudolf Spielmann (Austria)	½	½	1	0	0	0	x	½	½	½	1	1	½	1	1	0	8
7-8	Milan Vidmar (Yugoslavia)	0	½	0	½	0	½	½	x	½	½	1	1	½	1	½	1	8
9-10	Géza Maróczy (Hungary)	0	½	½	0	½	0	½	½	x	½	½	½	½	1	1	1	7½
9-10	Savielly Tartakower (Poland)	0	½	0	0	1	1	½	½	½	x	0	0	1	½	1	1	7½
11-12	Edgard Colle (Belgium)	0	0	0	1	1	1	0	0	½	1	x	0	½	1	0	½	6½
11-12	Hans Kmoch (Austria)	0	0	1	0	0	½	0	0	½	1	1	x	½	0	1	1	6½
13	José Joaquín Araiza (Mexico)	0	0	0	0	0	0	½	½	½	0	½	½	x	½	½	1	4½
14	Mario Monticelli (Italy)	0	0	0	1	0	0	0	0	0	½	0	1	½	x	½	½	4
15	Roberto Grau (Argentina)	0	0	0	0	0	½	0	½	0	0	1	0	½	½	x	½	3½
16	Massimiliano Romi (Italy)	0	0	0	0	0	0	1	0	0	0	½	0	0	½	½	x	2½
