= Julius du Mont =

British chess player (1881–1956)

Julius du Mont (15 December 1881, in Paris – 7 April 1956, in Hastings) was a French-born pianist, piano teacher, chess player, journalist, editor and writer. He studied music at the Frankfurt Conservatoire and at Heidelberg, and became a concert pianist. He emigrated to England as a young man and became a successful piano teacher. Amongst his pupils was Edna Iles. He settled in London and also gained a reputation as a strong chess player. He won club and county chess championships in the period leading up to World War I, and showed his mastery of the English language by writing a manual on the Lewis gun. After the war, chess writing took up more and more of his time. Perhaps his most famous work was 500 Master Games of Chess (1952), written in collaboration with Savielly Tartakower.

For some years, du Mont was chess columnist of The Field and of the Manchester Guardian. From 1940 to 1949, he was general editor of British Chess Magazine.

In 1955 du Mont suffered a stroke. He died 7 April 1956.

== Bibliography ==
- Chess Openings Illustrated
- I Centre Counter Defence (1919)
- II Centre and Danish Gambit (1920)
- The Elements of Chess (1925)
- The Basis of Combination in Chess (1938)
- 200 Miniature Games (1941)
- More Miniature Games (1953)
- 500 Master Games of Chess (with Savielly Tartakower), two volumes (1952)
- 100 Master Games of Modern Chess (with Savielly Tartakower), (1954)

== Translations ==
- Edward Lasker’s Chess Strategy
- Alekhine’s two volumes of My Best Games of Chess (the first with M. E. Goldstein)
- Rudolf Spielmann’s Art of Sacrifice in Chess
