= Tigran Petrosian =

Soviet-Armenian chess grandmaster (1929–1984)

Tigran Petrosian Տիգրան Պետրոսյան
- Petrosian in 1962

Personal information
- Born: Tigran Vardani Petrosian; 17 June 1929 Tiflis, Georgian SSR, Soviet Union
- Died: 13 August 1984 (aged 55) Moscow, Russian SFSR, Soviet Union

Chess career
- Country: Soviet Union
- Title: Grandmaster (1952)
- World Champion: 1963–1969
- Peak rating: 2645 (July 1972)
- Peak ranking: No. 3 (July 1972)

Tigran Vardani Petrosian (Armenian: Տիգրան Վարդանի Պետրոսյան; Russian: Тигран Вартанович Петросян; 17 June 1929 – 13 August 1984) was a Soviet-Armenian chess grandmaster. The ninth World Chess Champion from 1963 to 1969, he was nicknamed "Iron Tigran" due to his almost-impenetrable defensive playing style, which emphasized safety above all else. Petrosian is often credited with popularizing chess in Armenia.

Petrosian was a candidate for the World Chess Championship on eight occasions (1953, 1956, 1959, 1962, 1971, 1974, 1977 and 1980). He won the World Championship in 1963 (against Mikhail Botvinnik), successfully defended it in 1966 (against Boris Spassky), and lost it to Spassky in 1969. Thus he was the defending World Champion or a World Championship Candidate in ten consecutive three-year cycles. He won the Soviet Championship four times (1959, 1961, 1969, and 1975).

== Early life ==
Petrosian was born to Armenian parents on 17 June 1929, in Tbilisi, Georgian SSR (present-day Georgia). As a young boy, Petrosian was an excellent student and enjoyed studying, as did his brother Hmayak and sister Vartoosh. He learned to play chess at the age of eight, though his illiterate father Vartan encouraged him to continue studying, as he thought chess was unlikely to bring his son any success as a career. Petrosian was orphaned during World War II and was forced to sweep streets to earn a living. Around this time, his hearing began to deteriorate, a problem that continued to affect him throughout his life. In a 1969 interview with Time magazine, he recalled:

I started sweeping streets in the middle of the winter and it was horrible. Of course there were no machines then, so we had to do everything by hand. Some of the older men helped me out. I was a weak boy. And I was ashamed of being a street sweeper—that's natural, I suppose. It wasn't so bad in the early morning when the streets were empty, but when it got light and the crowds came out I really hated it. I got sick and missed a year in school. We had a babushka, a sister of my father, and she really saved me. She gave me bread to eat when I was sick and hungry. That's when this trouble with my hearing started. I don't remember how it all happened. Things aren't very clear from that time.

Petrosian used his rations to buy Chess Praxis by Danish grandmaster Aron Nimzowitsch, the book which Petrosian later stated had the greatest influence on him as a chess player. He also purchased The Art of Sacrifice in Chess by Rudolf Spielmann. The other player to have had an early effect on Petrosian's chess was José Raúl Capablanca. At the age of 12 he began training at the Tiflis Palace of Pioneers under the tutelage of Archil Ebralidze. Ebralidze was a supporter of Nimzowitsch and Capablanca, and his scientific approach to chess discouraged wild tactics and dubious combinations. As a result, Petrosian developed a repertoire of solid positional openings, such as the Caro–Kann Defence. After training at the Palace of Pioneers for just one year, he defeated visiting Soviet grandmaster Salo Flohr at a simultaneous exhibition.

By 1946, Petrosian had earned the title of Candidate Master. Also that year he drew against Grandmaster Paul Keres at the Georgian Chess Championship, then moved to Yerevan where he won the Armenian Chess Championship and the USSR Junior Chess Championship. Petrosian earned the title of Master during the 1947 USSR Chess Championship, though he failed to qualify for the finals. He set about improving his game by studying Nimzowitsch's My System and by moving to Moscow to seek greater competition.

== Grandmaster in Moscow ==
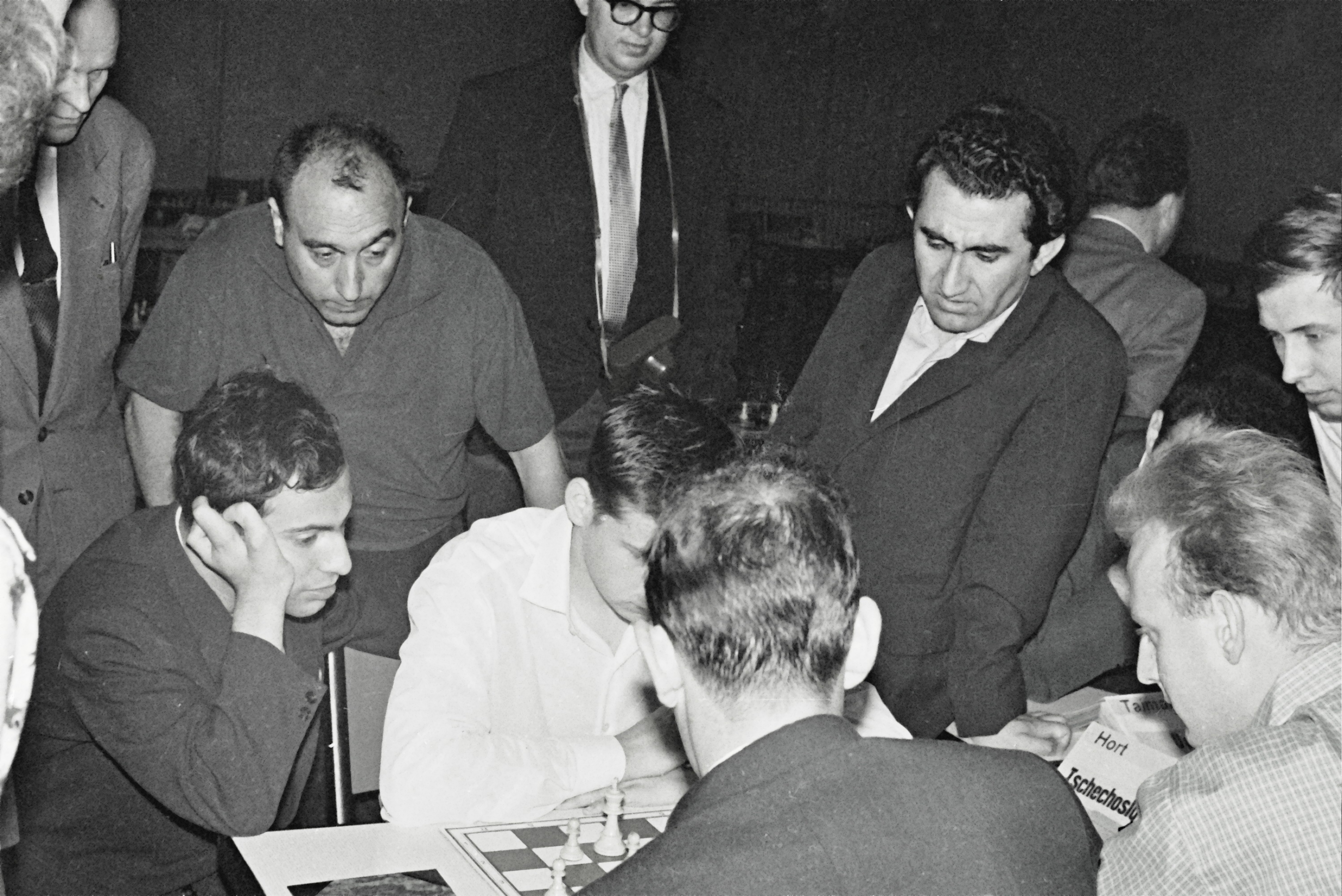
Petrosian (standing on right, with jacket) at the 1961 European Chess Team Championship. Seated, facing right, is Mikhail Tal, then world champion.

After moving to Moscow in 1949, Petrosian's career as a chess player advanced rapidly and his results in Soviet events steadily improved. He placed second in the 1951 Soviet Championship, thereby earning the title of international master. It was in this tournament that Petrosian faced world champion Botvinnik for the first time. Playing White, after obtaining a slightly inferior position from the opening, he defended through two adjournments and eleven total hours of play to obtain a draw. Petrosian's result in this event qualified him for the Interzonal the following year in Stockholm. He earned the title of Grandmaster by coming in second in the Stockholm tournament, and qualified for the 1953 Candidates Tournament.

Petrosian placed fifth in the 1953 Candidates Tournament, a result which marked the beginning of a stagnant period in his career. He seemed content drawing against weaker players and maintaining his title of Grandmaster rather than improving his chess or making an attempt at becoming World Champion. This attitude was illustrated by his result in the 1955 USSR Championship: out of 19 games played, Petrosian was undefeated, but won only four games and drew the rest, with each of the draws lasting twenty moves or fewer. Although his consistent playing ensured decent tournament results, it was looked down upon by the public and by Soviet chess media and authorities. Near the end of the event, journalist Vasily Panov wrote the following comment about the tournament contenders: "Real chances of victory, besides Botvinnik and Smyslov, up to round 15, are held by Geller, Spassky and Taimanov. I deliberately exclude Petrosian from the group, since from the very first rounds the latter has made it clear that he is playing for an easier, but also honourable conquest—a place in the interzonal quartet."

This period of complacency ended with the 1957 USSR Championship, where out of 21 games played, Petrosian won seven, lost four, and drew the remaining 10. Although this result was only good enough for seventh place in a field of 22 competitors, his more ambitious approach to tournament play was met with great appreciation from the Soviet chess community. He went on to win his first USSR Championship in 1959, and later that year in the Candidates Tournament he defeated Paul Keres with a display of his often-overlooked tactical abilities. Petrosian was awarded the title of Master of Sport of the USSR in 1960, and won a second Soviet title in 1961. His excellent playing continued through 1962 when he qualified for the Candidates Tournament for what would be his first World Championship match.

== 1963 World Championship ==
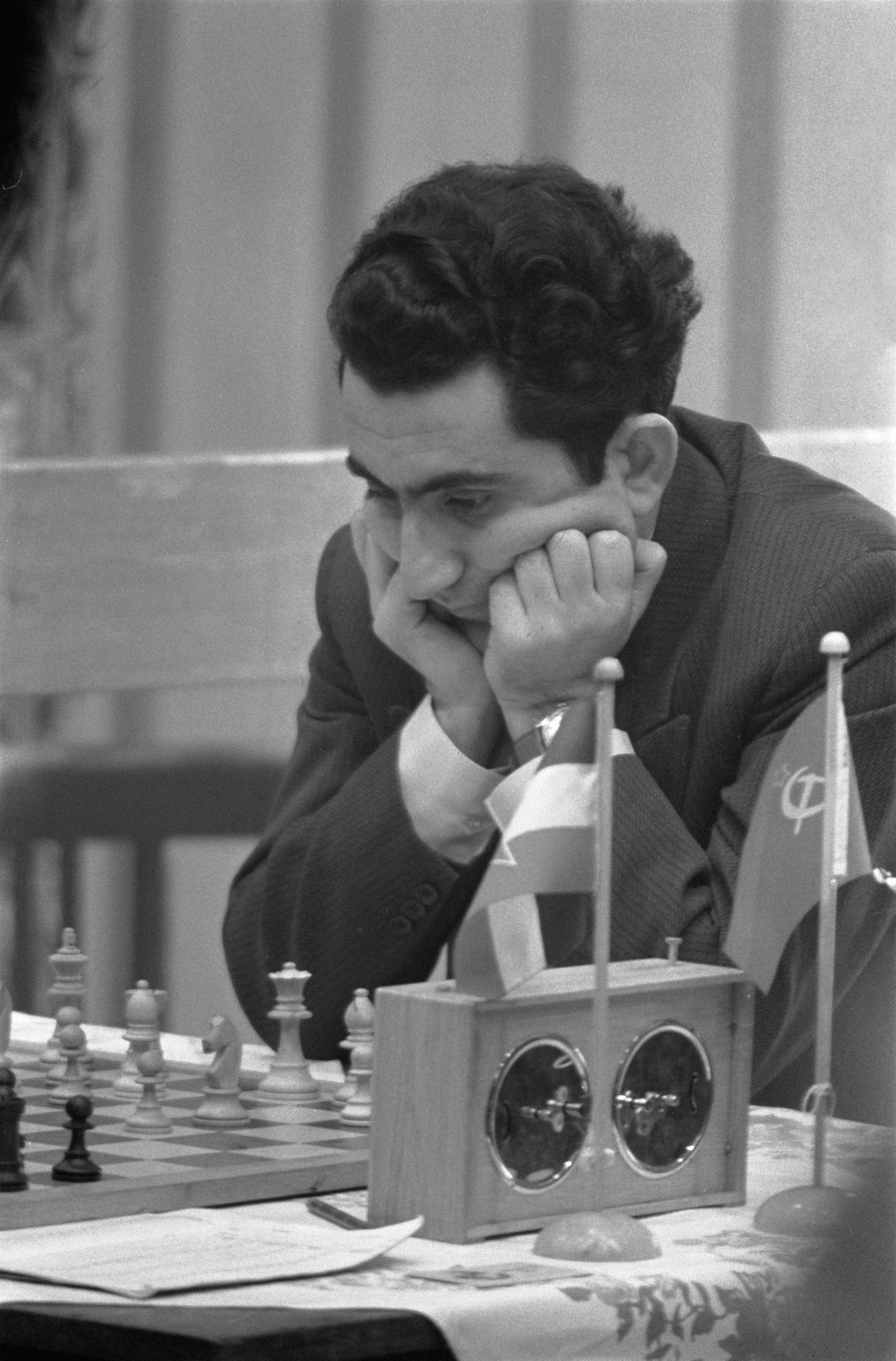
Petrosian in 1960

After playing in the 1962 Interzonal in Stockholm, Petrosian qualified for the Candidates Tournament in Curaçao along with Pal Benko, Miroslav Filip, Bobby Fischer, Efim Geller, Paul Keres, Viktor Korchnoi, and Mikhail Tal. Petrosian, representing the Soviet Union, won the tournament with a final score of 17½ points, followed by fellow Soviet players Geller and Keres, each with 17 points and the American Fischer with 14. Fischer later accused the Soviet players of arranging draws and having "ganged up" on him to prevent him from winning the tournament. As evidence for this claim, he noted that all 12 games played between Petrosian, Geller, and Keres were draws. Statisticians pointed out that when playing against each other, these Soviet competitors averaged 19 moves per game, as opposed to 39.5 moves when playing against other competitors. Although responses to Fischer's allegations were mixed, FIDE later adjusted the rules and format to try to prevent future collusion in the Candidates.

Having won the Candidates Tournament, Petrosian earned the right to challenge Mikhail Botvinnik for the title of World Chess Champion in a 24-game match. In addition to practicing his chess, Petrosian also prepared for the match by skiing for several hours each day. He believed that in such a long match, physical fitness and endurance could become a factor in the later games. This advantage was increased by Botvinnik being much older than Petrosian. Whereas a multitude of draws in tournament play could prevent a player from taking first place, draws did not affect the outcome of a one-on-one match. In this regard, Petrosian's cautious playing style was well-suited for match play, as he could simply wait for his opponent to make mistakes and then capitalize on them. Petrosian won the match against Botvinnik with a final score of 5 to 2 with 15 draws, securing the title of World Champion.

== Reigning World Champion ==
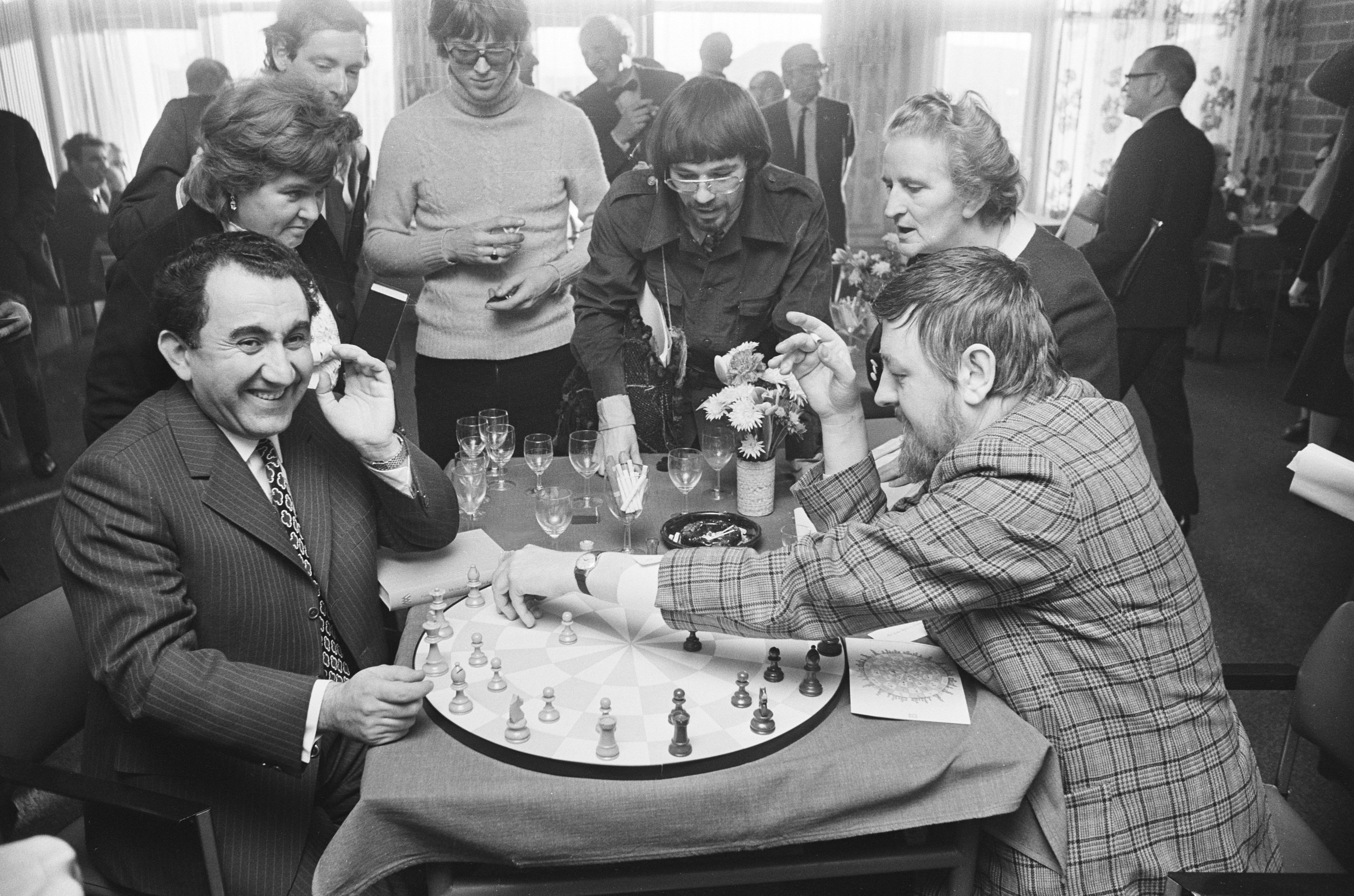
Petrosian and Jan Hein Donner at the Wijk aan Zee tournament in 1971

Upon becoming World Champion, Petrosian campaigned for the publication of a chess newspaper for the entire Soviet Union, rather than just in Moscow. This newspaper became known as 64. Petrosian studied for a degree of Master of Philosophical Science at Yerevan State University; his thesis, dated 1968, was titled "Chess Logic, Some Problems of the Logic of Chess Thought".

In 1966, three years after Petrosian had earned the title of World Chess Champion, he was challenged by Boris Spassky. Petrosian defended his title by winning rather than drawing the match, a feat that had not been accomplished since Alexander Alekhine defeated Efim Bogoljubov in the 1934 World Championship. However, Spassky defeated Efim Geller, Bent Larsen, and Viktor Korchnoi in the next candidates cycle, earning a rematch with Petrosian, in 1969. Spassky won the match by 12½–10½.

== Later career ==
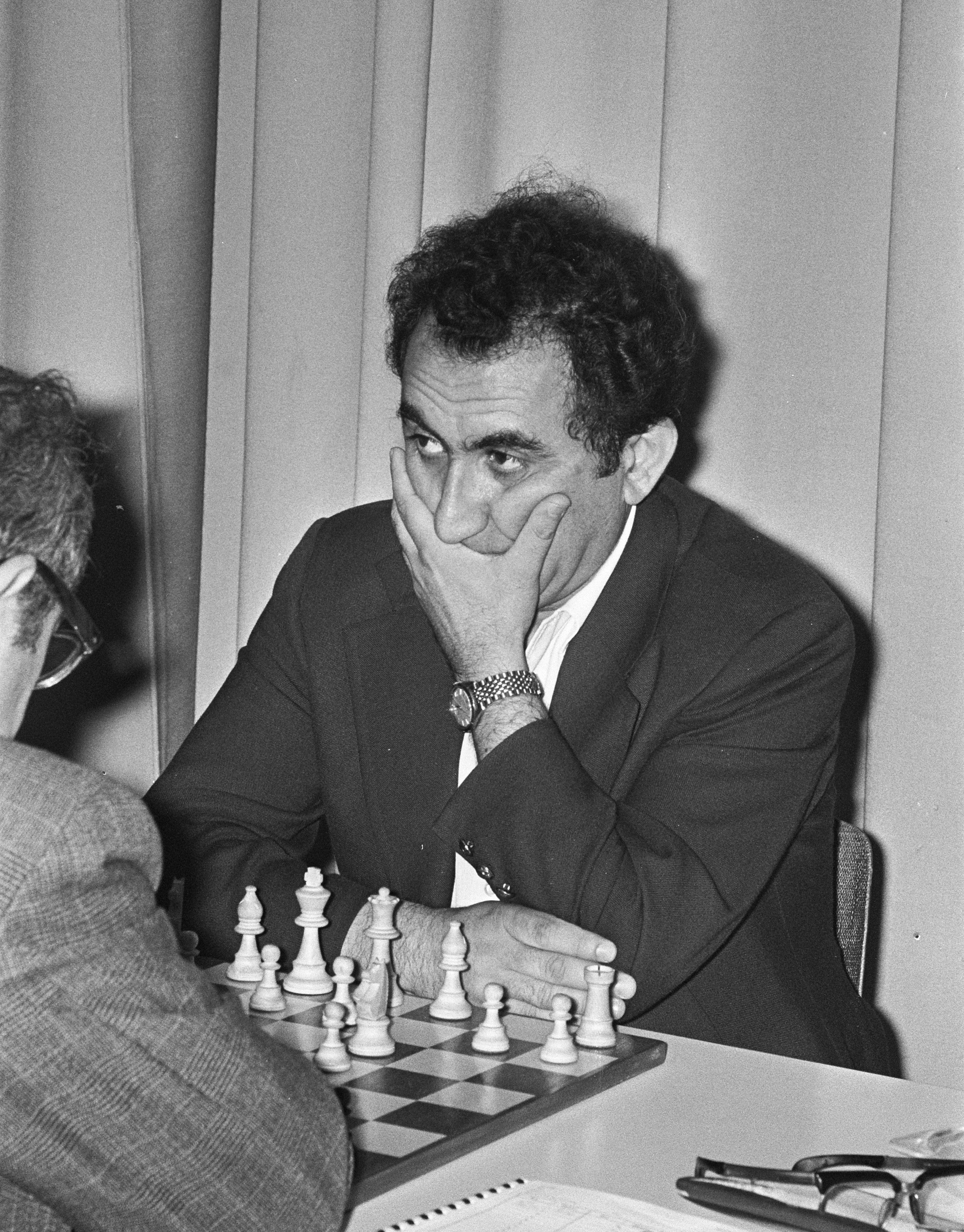
Petrosian in 1973

Along with a number of other Soviet chess champions, he signed a petition condemning the actions of the defector Viktor Korchnoi in 1976. It was the continuation of a bitter feud between the two, dating back at least to their 1974 Candidates semifinal match in which Petrosian withdrew after five games while trailing 1½–3½ (+1−3=1). His match with Korchnoi in 1977 saw the two former colleagues refuse to shake hands or speak to each other. They even demanded separate eating and toilet facilities. Petrosian lost the match, and was fired from his position as editor of Russia's largest chess magazine, 64. His detractors condemned his reluctance to attack, with some attributing this to a lack of courage. At this point Botvinnik spoke on his behalf, stating that Petrosian only attacked when he felt secure, and his greatest strength was in defence.

Some of his late successes included victories at Lone Pine 1976 and in the 1979 Paul Keres Memorial tournament in Tallinn (12/16 without a loss, ahead of Tal, Bronstein, and others). He shared first place (with Lajos Portisch and Robert Hübner) in the Rio de Janeiro Interzonal the same year, and won second place in Tilburg in 1981, half a point behind the winner Alexander Beliavsky. It was here that he played his last famous victory, a miraculous escape against the young Garry Kasparov.

== Personal life ==
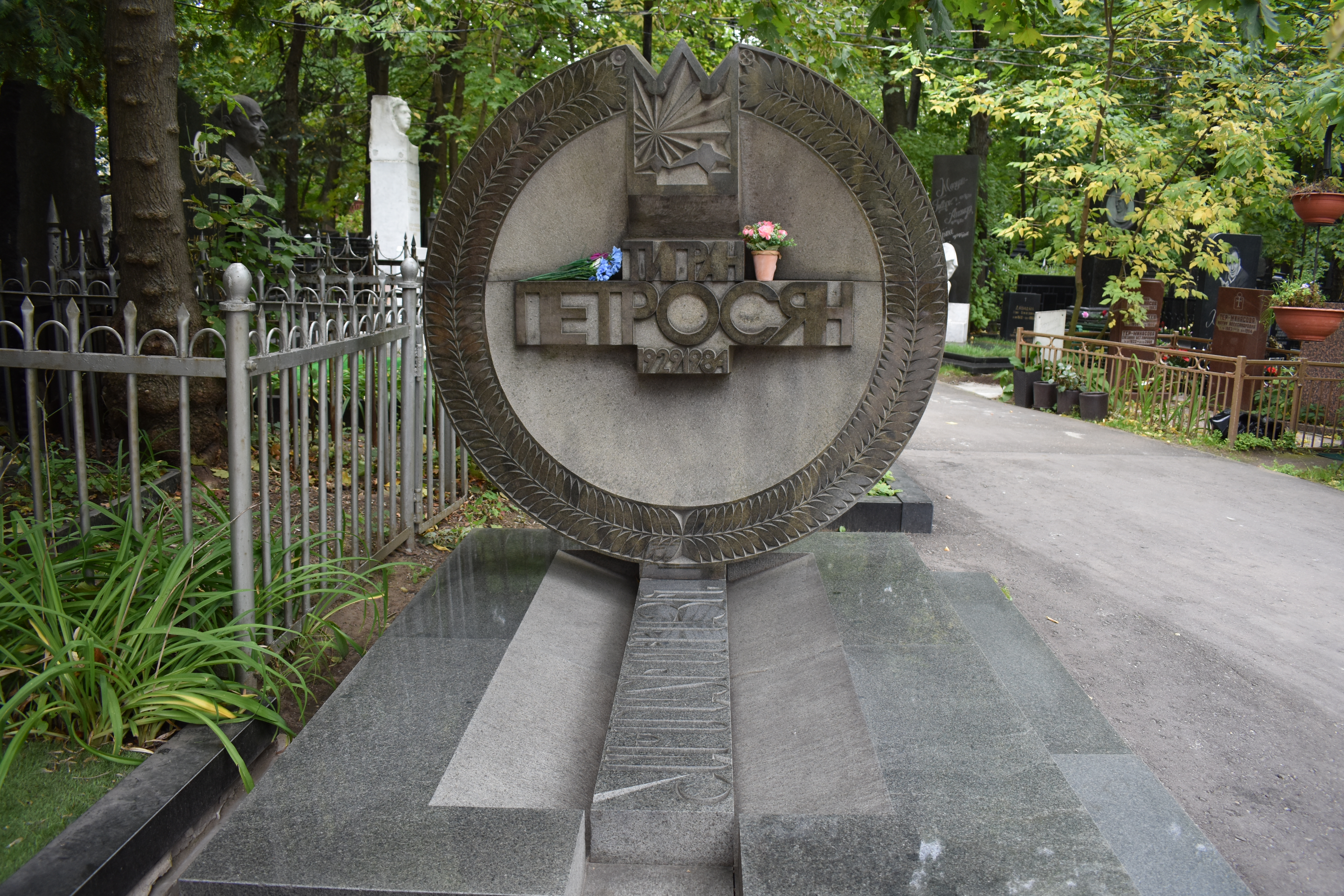
Petrosian's grave at the Armenian cemetery, Moscow

Petrosian lived in Moscow from 1949. In the 1960s and 1970s, he lived at 59 Pyatnitskaya Street. When asked by Anthony Saidy whether he is Russian, Petrosian replied: "Abroad, they call us all Russians. I am a Soviet Armenian."

In 1952, Petrosian married Rona Yakovlevna (née Avinezer, 1923–2005), a Russian Jew born in Kiev, Ukraine. A graduate of the Moscow Institute of Foreign Languages, she was an English teacher and interpreter. She is buried at the Jewish section of the Vostryakovsky cemetery in Moscow. They had two sons: Vartan and Mikhail. The latter was Rona's son from the first marriage.

His hobbies included football, backgammon, cross-country skiing, table tennis, and gardening.

Petrosian died in Moscow of stomach cancer on 13 August 1984, and is buried in the Moscow Armenian Cemetery.

=== Deafness ===
Petrosian was partially deaf and wore a hearing aid during his matches, which sometimes led to strange situations. On one occasion he offered a draw to Svetozar Gligorić, which Gligorić initially refused in surprise, but then changed his mind in a few seconds and re-offered the draw. Petrosian did not even respond to the offer, later winning the game. It was later found that he switched off his hearing aid, and did not hear when Gligorić re-offered the draw. In 1971, he played a Candidates match against Robert Hübner in a noisy area in Seville, which did not disturb him but frustrated Hübner so much that he withdrew from the match. Despite his poor hearing, he was a great lover of classical music and enjoyed attending concerts.

== Recognition and legacy ==
At the time of his death, Petrosian was working on a set of chess-related lectures and articles to be compiled in a book. These were edited by his wife Rona and published posthumously, in Russian under the title Шахматные лекции Петросяна (1989) and in English as Petrosian's Legacy (1990).

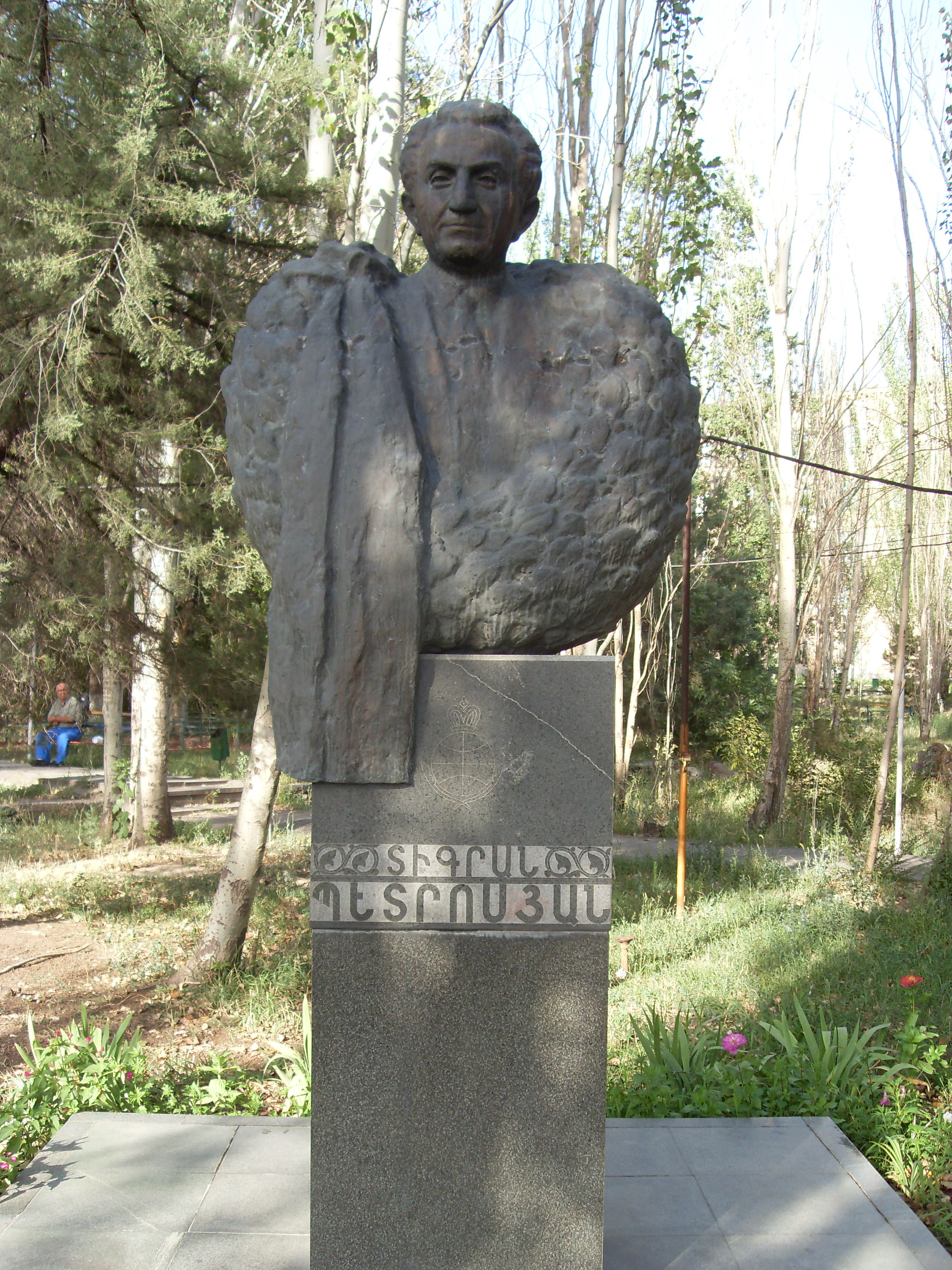
Petrosian's statue near the Yerevan Chess House

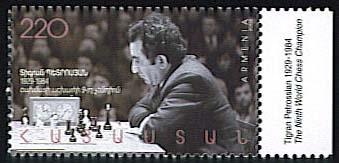
To commemorate the 75th anniversary of his birth, Armenia issued this stamp in 2005.

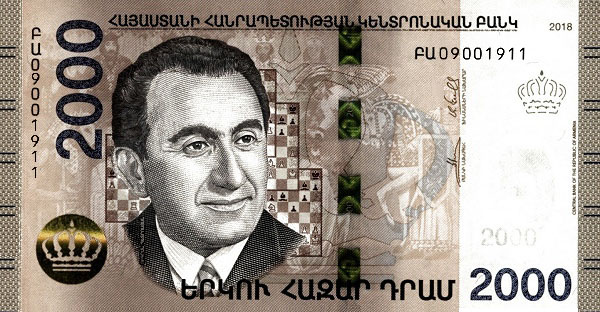
Petrosian on a 2018 2000 dram banknote

In 1987, World Chess Champion Garry Kasparov unveiled a memorial at Petrosian's grave which depicts the laurel wreath awarded to Chess World Champion and an image contained within a crown of the sun shining above the twin peaks of Mount Ararat – the national symbol of Petrosian's Armenian homeland. On 7 July 2006, a monument honouring Petrosian was opened in the Davtashen district of Yerevan, in the street named after Petrosian. Petrosian was also honoured on the third banknote series of the Armenian dram, with his image on the 2,000 dram banknote.

== Olympiads and team championships ==
Petrosian was not selected for the Soviet Olympiad team until 1958; though he had already been a Candidate twice by that time. From that point, however, he made ten straight Soviet Olympiad teams from 1958 to 1978, won nine team gold medals, one team silver medal, and six individual gold medals. His overall performance in Olympiad play is impressive: +78−1=50 (only one game lost, to Robert Hübner, out of 129 played), or 79.8 percent, the all-time third-best performance after Anatoly Karpov (+43−2=23 or 80.1 percent) and Mikhail Tal (+65−2=34 or 81.2 percent). His Olympiad results follow:

- Munich 1958, 2nd reserve, 10½/13 (+8−0=5), board and team gold medals
- Leipzig 1960, 2nd reserve, 12/13 (+11−0=2), board and team gold medals
- Varna 1962, board 2, 10/12 (+8−0=4), board and team gold medals
- Tel Aviv 1964, board 1, 9½/13 (+6−0=7), team gold medal
- Havana 1966, board 1, 11½/13 (+10−0=3), board and team gold medals
- Lugano 1968, board 1, 10½/12 (+9−0=3), board and team gold medals
- Siegen 1970, board 2, 10/14 (+6−0=8), team gold medal
- Skopje 1972, board 1, 10½/16 (+6−1=9), team gold medal
- Nice 1974, board 4, 12½/14 (+11−0=3), board and team gold medals
- Buenos Aires 1978, board 2, 6/9 (+3−0=6), team silver medal

Petrosian also made the Soviet team for the first eight European Team Championships (from 1957 to 1983). He won eight team gold medals, and four board gold medals. His totals in Euroteams play are (+15−0=37), for 64.4 per cent. His Euroteams results follow:

- Vienna 1957, board 6, 4/5 (+3−0=2), board and team gold medals
- Oberhausen 1961, board 4, 6/8 (+4−0=4), board and team gold medals
- Hamburg 1965, board 1, 6/10 (+2−0=8), board and team gold medals
- Kapfenberg 1970, board 1, 3½/6 (+1−0=5), team gold medal
- Bath, Somerset 1973, board 2, 4½/7 (+2−0=5), board and team gold medals
- Moscow 1977, board 2, 3½/6 (+1−0=5), team gold medal
- Skara 1980, board 3, 2½/5 (+0−0=5), team gold medal
- Plovdiv 1983, board 3, 3½/5 (+2−0=3), team gold medal

== Playing style ==
Petrosian was a conservative, cautious, and highly defensive chess player who was strongly influenced by Aron Nimzowitsch's idea of prophylaxis. He made more effort to prevent his opponent's offensive capabilities than he did to make use of his own, and very rarely went on the offensive unless he felt his position was completely secure. He usually won by playing consistently until an overly aggressive opponent made a mistake, securing victory by capitalizing upon this mistake without revealing any weaknesses of his own. This style of play often led to draws, especially against other players who preferred to counterattack. Nonetheless, his patience and mastery of defence made him extremely difficult to defeat. He was undefeated at the 1952 and 1955 Interzonals, and in 1962 he did not lose a single tournament game. Petrosian's consistent ability to avoid defeat earned him the nickname "Iron Tigran". He was considered to be the hardest player to beat in the history of chess by the authors of a 2004 book, and future World Champion Vladimir Kramnik called him "the first defender with a capital D".

Petrosian preferred to play closed openings that did not commit his pieces to any particular plan. As black, Petrosian enjoyed playing the Sicilian Defence, Najdorf Variation and the French Defence. As white, he often played the English Opening. Petrosian would often move the same piece multiple times in a few moves, confusing his opponents in the opening and threatening draws by threefold repetition in the endgame. In a game against Mark Taimanov during the 1955 USSR Chess Championship, Petrosian moved the same rook six times in a 24-move game, with four of those moves occurring on consecutive turns. He had a strong affinity for knights rather than bishops, a characteristic that is often attributed to the influence of Aron Nimzowitsch.

A number of illustrative metaphors have been used to describe Petrosian's style of play. Harold C. Schonberg said that "playing him was like trying to put handcuffs on an eel. There was nothing to grip." He has been described as a centipede lurking in the dark, a tiger looking for the opportunity to pounce, a python who slowly squeezes his victims to death, and as a crocodile who waits for hours to make a decisive strike. Boris Spassky, who succeeded Petrosian as World Chess Champion, described his style of play thus: "Petrosian reminds me of a hedgehog. Just when you think you have caught him, he puts out his quills."

Petrosian's style of play, although highly successful for avoiding defeats, was criticized as being dull. Chess enthusiasts saw his "ultraconservative" style as an unwelcome contrast to the popular image of Soviet chess as "daring" and "indomitable". His 1971 Candidates Tournament match with Viktor Korchnoi featured so many monotonous draws that the Russian press began to complain. However, Svetozar Gligorić described Petrosian as being "very impressive in his incomparable ability to foresee danger on the board and to avoid any risk of defeat." Petrosian responded to his criticisms by saying: "They say my games should be more 'interesting'. I could be more 'interesting'—and also lose."

Another consequence of Petrosian's style of play was that he did not score many victories, which in turn meant he seldom won tournaments even though he often finished second or third. However, his style was extremely effective in matches.

Petrosian could also occasionally play in an attacking, sacrificial style. In his 1966 match with Spassky, he won Game 7 and Game 10 this way. Spassky subsequently stated: "It is to Petrosian's advantage that his opponents never know when he is suddenly going to play like Mikhail Tal." (Tal was known as the most aggressive attacker of his era.)

=== The positional exchange sacrifice ===
Petrosian was known for his use of the "positional exchange sacrifice", where one side sacrifices a rook for the opponent's bishop or knight. Kasparov discussed Petrosian's use of this motif:

Petrosian introduced the exchange sacrifice for the sake of 'quality of position', where the time factor, which is so important in the play of Alekhine and Tal, plays hardly any role. Even today, very few players can operate confidently at the board with such abstract concepts. Before Petrosian no one had studied this. By sacrificing the exchange 'just like that', for certain long term advantages, in positions with disrupted material balance, he discovered latent resources that few were capable of seeing and properly evaluating.

Reshevsky vs. Petrosian, 1953

Position: g1 white king, e1 white rook, h2 white pawn, g2 white pawn, b2 white bishop, e3 white rook, c3 white pawn, a3 white pawn, g4 white bishop, f4 white queen, d4 white pawn, c4 black pawn, e5 white pawn, b5 black pawn, a5 black pawn, g6 black bishop, c6 black knight, h7 black pawn, g7 black pawn, f7 black pawn, e7 black rook, g8 black king, e8 black queen, d8 black rook

Position after 25.Rfe1

One of Petrosian's most famous examples of the positional exchange sacrifice is from his game against Samuel Reshevsky in Zurich 1953 (diagram). Reshevsky, as White, appears to have an advantage due to his strong pawn centre, which may become mobile after Bf3 and d4–d5. Petrosian realized he was in a difficult position because of the passive placement of his pieces, relegated to defensive roles. He further understood that White might also advance on the kingside with h2–h4–h5, provoking weaknesses that would make it more difficult to defend later on. Faced with these threats, Petrosian devised a plan to maneuver his knight to the square d5, where it would be prominently placed in the centre and blockade the advance of White's pawns.

25... Re6!

With the rook vacated from e7, the black knight is free to move to d5, where it will be attacking the pawn on c3 and help support an eventual advance of his queenside pawn majority with ...b5–b4.

26. a4 Ne7 27. Bxe6 fxe6 28. Qf1 Nd5 29. Rf3 Bd3 30. Rxd3 cxd3

The game was eventually drawn on move 41.

=== Contributions to opening theory ===
KID, Petrosian System

Position: a8 black rook, b8 black knight, c8 black bishop, d8 black queen, f8 black rook, g8 black king, a7 black pawn, b7 black pawn, c7 black pawn, f7 black pawn, g7 black bishop, h7 black pawn, d6 black pawn, f6 black knight, g6 black pawn, d5 white pawn, e5 black pawn, c4 white pawn, e4 white pawn, c3 white knight, f3 white knight, a2 white pawn, b2 white pawn, e2 white bishop, f2 white pawn, g2 white pawn, h2 white pawn, a1 white rook, c1 white bishop, d1 white queen, e1 white king, h1 white rook

1.d4 Nf6 2.c4 g6 3.Nc3 Bg7 4.e4 d6 5.Nf3 0-0 6.Be2 e5 7.d5

Petrosian was an expert against the King's Indian Defence, and he often played what is now known as the Petrosian System: 1.d4 Nf6 2.c4 g6 3.Nc3 Bg7 4.e4 d6 5.Nf3 0-0 6.Be2 e5 7.d5. This variation closes the centre early in the game. One of the tactical ideas for White is to play Bg5, pinning Black's knight to his queen. Black can respond by either moving his queen (usually ...Qe8) or by playing ...h6, though the latter move weakens Black's kingside pawn structure. Two of Black's responses to the Petrosian Variation were developed by grandmasters Paul Keres and Leonid Stein. The Keres Variation arises after 7...Nbd7 8.Bg5 h6 9.Bh4 g5 10.Bg3 Nh5 11.h4, and the Stein Variation starts with prophylaxis on the queenside, securing the c5-square for a knight with 7...a5.

The Queen's Indian Defence also has a variation developed by Petrosian: 1.d4 Nf6 2.c4 e6 3.Nf3 b6 4.a3, with the idea of preventing ...Bb4+. The loss of tempo is compensated by the positional threat of d4-d5. This system received much attention in 1980, when it was used by the young Garry Kasparov to defeat several grandmasters. Today the Petrosian Variation is still considered one of the most pressing variations, with the greatest score in Master games.

Other Petrosian variations can be found in the Grünfeld Defence after 1.d4 Nf6 2.c4 g6 3.Nc3 d5 4.Nf3 Bg7 5.Bg5, and the French Defence after 1.e4 e6 2.d4 d5 3.Nc3 Bb4 4.e5 Qd7. Some authorities refer to a variation of the Caro–Kann Defence with his name, along with former world champion Vassily Smyslov: the Petrosian–Smyslov Variation, 1.e4 c6 2.d4 d5 3.Nc3 dxe4 4.Nxe4 Nd7.

== Quotes ==
- "In those years, it was easier to win the Soviet Championship than a game against 'Iron Tigran'." — Lev Polugaevsky
- "It is to Petrosian's advantage that his opponents never know when he is suddenly going to play like Mikhail Tal." — Boris Spassky
- "I'm absolutely convinced that in chess – although it remains a game – there is nothing accidental. And this is my credo. I like only those chess games, in which I have played in accordance with the position requirements ... I believe only in logical and right game." — Tigran Petrosian
- "During tournament analysis sessions players all speak at once, but whenever Petrosian said anything, everyone would shut up and listen." — Yasser Seirawan
- "I associate Tigran Petrosian with Warne Marsh. A unique style of play which, it seemed, was too calm and dull, while in reality it was deep and cunning." — Levon Aronian

== Notable games ==
Petrosian vs. Pachman, 1961

Position: a8 black rook, c8 black bishop, d8 black rook, b7 black pawn, e7 black knight, f7 black pawn, g7 white bishop, h7 black pawn, e6 black pawn, g6 black pawn, a5 black pawn, b5 black queen, c5 black pawn, g5 black king, c4 white knight, e4 white rook, b3 white pawn, d3 white pawn, g3 white pawn, b2 white pawn, c2 white pawn, f2 white pawn, g2 white bishop, h2 white pawn, a1 white rook, g1 white king

Final position after 21.Bg7
- Tigran Petrosian vs. Luděk Pachman, Bled (1961), Bled YUG, rd 6
  Petrosian sacrifices his queen to lure out Black's king and trap it in a mating net.
King's Indian Attack (ECO A07)
1.Nf3 c5 2.g3 Nc6 3.Bg2 g6 4.0-0 Bg7 5.d3 e6 6.e4 Nge7 7.Re1 0-0 8.e5 d6 9.exd6 Qxd6 10.Nbd2 Qc7 11.Nb3 Nd4 12.Bf4 Qb6 13.Ne5 Nxb3 14.Nc4 Qb5 15.axb3 a5 16.Bd6 Bf6 17.Qf3 Kg7 18.Re4 Rd8 19.Qxf6+ Kxf6 20.Be5+ Kg5 21.Bg7 (diagram) 1–0
Spassky vs. Petrosian, 1966

Position: h1 white king, g1 white rook, d1 white rook, h2 white knight, g2 white pawn, f2 white pawn, e2 white bishop, d2 white queen, e3 white pawn, c3 white pawn, h4 black pawn, g4 black rook, f4 white bishop, c4 black pawn, b4 white pawn, h5 black pawn, e5 black knight, d5 black pawn, b5 black pawn, a5 white pawn, e6 black pawn, a6 black pawn, f7 black pawn, c7 black queen, b7 black bishop, g8 black rook, f8 black bishop, c8 black king

Position after 24...Nxe5
- Boris Spassky vs. Tigran Petrosian, World Chess Championship 1966, Moscow URS, rd 7
  Petrosian plays an exchange sacrifice to launch a dangerous attack against Black's king, later sacrificing a piece.
Torre Attack (ECO A46)
1.d4 Nf6 2.Nf3 e6 3.Bg5 d5 4.Nbd2 Be7 5.e3 Nbd7 6.Bd3 c5 7.c3 b6 8.0-0 Bb7 9.Ne5 Nxe5 10.dxe5 Nd7 11.Bf4 Qc7 12.Nf3 h6 13.Bg3 g5 14.b4 h5 15.h4 gxh4 16.Bf4 0-0-0 17.a4 c4 18.Be2 a6 19.Kh1 Rdg8 20.Rg1 Rg4 21.Qd2 Rhg8 22.a5 b5 23.Rad1 Bf8 24.Nh2 Nxe5 (diagram) 25.Nxg4 hxg4 26.e4 Bd6 27.Qe3 Nd7 28.Bxd6 Qxd6 29.Rd4 e5 30.Rd2 f5 31.exd5 f4 32.Qe4 Nf6 33.Qf5+ Kb8 34.f3 Bc8 35.Qb1 g3 36.Re1 h3 37.Bf1 Rh8 38.gxh3 Bxh3 39.Kg1 Bxf1 40.Kxf1 e4 41.Qd1 Ng4 42.fxg4 f3 43.Rg2 fxg2+ 0–1
Petrosian vs. Spassky, 1966

Position: g8 black king, h8 white queen, f7 black rook, h7 black pawn, a6 black pawn, d6 white knight, a5 black knight, b5 black pawn, c5 black pawn, d5 white pawn, g5 black queen, c4 white pawn, b3 white pawn, e3 white knight, a2 white pawn, h2 white pawn, h1 white king

Final position after 30.Qh8+
- Tigran Petrosian vs. Boris Spassky, World Chess Championship 1966, Moscow URS, rd 10
  Petrosian plays two exchange sacrifices for a strong initiative, culminating in an elegant fork tactic.
King's Indian Defense, Fianchetto Variation (ECO A63)
1.Nf3 Nf6 2.g3 g6 3.c4 Bg7 4.Bg2 0-0 5.0-0 Nc6 6.Nc3 d6 7.d4 a6 8.d5 Na5 9.Nd2 c5 10.Qc2 e5 11.b3 Ng4 12.e4 f5 13.exf5 gxf5 14.Nd1 b5 15.f3 e4 16.Bb2 exf3 17.Bxf3 Bxb2 18.Qxb2 Ne5 19.Be2 f4 20.gxf4 Bh3 21.Ne3 Bxf1 22.Rxf1 Ng6 23.Bg4 Nxf4 24.Rxf4 Rxf4 25.Be6+ Rf7 26.Ne4 Qh4 27.Nxd6 Qg5+ 28.Kh1 Ra7 29.Bxf7+ Rxf7 30.Qh8+ (diagram) 1–0

== See also ==
- Chess in Armenia

Awards
| Preceded by Mikhail Botvinnik | World Chess Champion; 1963–1969 | Succeeded by Boris Spassky |
Achievements
| Preceded by David Bronstein | Youngest chess grandmaster ever 1952–1955 | Succeeded by Boris Spassky |
