= Nimzowitsch Defence =

Chess opening

Position: a8 black rook, c8 black bishop, d8 black queen, e8 black king, f8 black bishop, g8 black knight, h8 black rook, a7 black pawn, b7 black pawn, c7 black pawn, d7 black pawn, e7 black pawn, f7 black pawn, g7 black pawn, h7 black pawn, c6 black knight, e4 white pawn, a2 white pawn, b2 white pawn, c2 white pawn, d2 white pawn, f2 white pawn, g2 white pawn, h2 white pawn, a1 white rook, b1 white knight, c1 white bishop, d1 white queen, e1 white king, f1 white bishop, g1 white knight, h1 white rook
- Moves: 1.e4 Nc6
- ECO: B00
- Named after: Aron Nimzowitsch
- Parent: King's Pawn Game

The Nimzowitsch Defence is a somewhat uncommon chess opening characterised by the moves:

1. e4 Nc6

It is named after Aron Nimzowitsch. Play usually continues 2.d4 d5 (the Scandinavian Variation) or 2.d4 e5 (the Kennedy Variation). White can also play 2.Nf3, offering a transposition to a more common opening if Black plays 2...e5. Black can refuse this, usually by playing 2...d5 or 2...d6 (the Williams Variation).

This opening is an example of a hypermodern opening in which Black invites White to occupy the centre of the board at an early stage with pawns. Black's intent is to block or otherwise restrain White's central pawns and, if allowed to do so by inaccurate play by White, eventually undermine the White pawn centre by well-timed pawn advances of their own or by attacking the white pieces defending the centre. World Champion Garry Kasparov and Grandmaster Raymond Keene wrote that it "has never been fully accepted as a dependable opening. Nevertheless it is sound and offers the maverick spirit a great deal of foreign territory to explore."

The Nimzowitsch is included under code B00 in the Encyclopaedia of Chess Openings.

== Main line: 2.d4 ==
White takes the initiative in the centre. Black's main continuations are 2...d5 or 2...e5.

=== 2...d5 ===
The line that Aron Nimzowitsch, the originator of the opening, usually preferred. Now White can choose among:

- 3.e5, which Black usually meets with 3...Bf5, (although 3...f6 is also a decent, though more complex, variation) followed by playing ...e6 (which no longer locks in the light-squared bishop) and later attacking White's central pawn chain with moves such as ...f6 and ...c5.
- 3.exd5 Qxd5, followed by 4.Nf3, seeking to gain time by attacking the queen with Nc3, but enabling Black to put pressure on White's centre with 4...Bg4 or 4...e5.
- 3.Nc3 dxe4 (3...e6 leads to a type of French Defence) 4.d5 Ne5, when White usually continues with 5.Qd4 or 5.Bf4 Ng6 6.Bg3.

=== 2...e5 ===
A solid line favoured by the late British grandmaster Tony Miles. White can transpose to the Scotch Game with 3.Nf3, or play 3.d5 Nce7 (intending 4...Ng6 – the Black Knight's Tango; 3...Nb8, though perhaps not as bad as it looks, is considered inferior), which gives White only a slight plus score in practice. Another approach is 3.dxe5 Nxe5, when White can seek a quiet positional advantage with 4.Nf3 or play the more aggressive (but potentially weakening) thrust 4.f4.

== 2.Nf3 ==
Shown by some databases to be the most common move, 2.Nf3 is often played by White players not eager for a theoretical battle on their opponent's turf.

- 2...e5, transposing to a double king-pawn opening, may be the best move, but is unlikely to appeal to the hard-core Nimzowitsch player.
- The sharp 2...f5, the Colorado Gambit, although somewhat dubious, was played with some success by the American international master (IM) Doug Root, and more recently by the Finnish IM Olli Salmensuu and others. It may lead to wild complications, e.g. 3.exf5 d5 4.Nh4!? e5!? 5. Qh5+ g6 6.fxg6 Nf6! 7.g7+ Nxh5 8.gxh8=Q Qxh4 9.Qxh7 Nd4, when White is an exchange up, but Black has a huge lead in development and White's king is in jeopardy. Naiditsch–Doettling, Dortmund 2000, ended in a draw after further complications: 10.Qg6+ Kd8 11.d3 Nf4! 12.Qf7 Bb4+ 13.c3 Bg4! 14.Qg8+ Kd7 15.Qg7+ Kc6 16.g3 Nf3+ 17.Kd1 Nd4+ 18.Kd2 Nf3+ 19.Kd1 Nd4+ ½–½. The British IM Gary Lane advocates the more solid 4.d4 Bxf5 5.Bb5 (trying to control the weakened e5-square) Qd6 6.Ne5 Nf6 7.0-0 Nd7 8.Bxc6 bxc6 9.Qf3! Nxe5 (or 9...e6 10.g4 Bg6 11.Nxg6 hxg6 12.Bf4 Qb4 13.Qd3) 10.Qxf5 Nf7 11.Bf4 Qd7 12.Qxd7+ Kxd7 13.Nd2 when Black's inferior pawn structure gave White a small advantage in Shaw–Salmensuu, European Team Championship, León 2001 (1–0, 63).
- 2...d6, the Williams Variation, is known to be a solid option for Black, but is less dynamic than the former options and can lead to an inferior version of the Pirc Defence. The main line continues 3.d4 Bg4, but 3...Nf6 is completely playable. The line usually continues 4.Bb5 a6 5.Bxc6+, leading to a fairly equal position, but a sharper try for White is 4.d5 Ne5 5.Nxe5!?, the Keene Attack, named after Raymond Keene, who played it in a 1964 game against E. Fielder. While this attack sacrifices the queen, White can gain it back after 5...Bxd1 6.Bb5+ c6 7.dxc6 Qa5+ 8.Nc3 0-0-0 9.Nc4 Qc7 10.Nd5.
- Other moves, including 2...e6, 2...Nf6, 2...d5, and 2...g6 are playable but tend to lead to inferior variations of, respectively, the French Defence, Alekhine's Defence, Scandinavian Defence, or Robatsch Defence.
  - After 2...Nf6 3.e5 Ng4?! is possible, invented by Spanish GM Marc Narciso Dublan, who called it "El Columpio" ("The Swing"). After 4.d4 d6 5.h3 Nh6 both the Exchange Variation (6.exd6) and the Pin Variation (6.Bb5) give White the edge. Worth exploring is the El Columpio Gambit (The Swing Gambit): 6.e6?!

== See also ==
- List of chess openings
- List of chess openings named after people
