= My System =

1925 chess book by Aron Nimzowitsch

- The title page of the 1930 Harcourt, Brace & Co. edition. Click to access a PDF of the book.
- Author: Aron Nimzowitsch
- Original title: Mein System
- Translator: Philip Hereford
- Language: German
- Subject: Chess theory
- Publication date: 1925
- Publication place: Germany
- English publication date: 1929
- ISBN: 0-7134-5655-8 1987 reprint

My System (German: Mein System) is a book on chess theory written by Aron Nimzowitsch. Originally published as a series of five brochures from 1925 to 1927, the book introduced many new concepts to followers of the modern school of thought. It was one of the early works on hypermodernism, a school of thought which challenged the classical principles commonplace at the time.

It is generally considered to be one of the most important books in the history of chess.

== Contents ==
The book is divided into three parts: "The Elements", "Positional Play", and "Illustrative Games".

=== The Elements ===
In "The Elements" (German: Die Elemente), Nimzowitsch writes about the basics of his "system". He regards the following as the elements of chess strategy:

1. The center
2. Play on the open files
3. Play on the seventh and eighth ranks
4. The passed pawns
5. The pin
6. Discovered checks
7. Exchanging
8. The pawn-chain

=== Positional Play ===
The next part, "Positional Play" (German: Das Positionsspiel), is based largely on the elements taught in the first part. In it, Nimzowitsch tells how to play for a positional advantage. In particular, he argues that the center can be effectively controlled using pieces instead of pawns. This concept, now widely accepted, is one of the fundamental principles of hypermodernism.

=== Illustrative Games ===
"Illustrative Games" contains annotated versions of fifty of Nimzowitsch's career games, which he refers to throughout the text.

== Editions ==
- The original German edition was published in 1925.
- In 1929, a British English edition titled My System, translated by Philip Hereford, was published by G. Bell and Sons, Ltd. A second printing was published in 1938 and included an errata sheet. This edition is out-of-print.
- In 1930, an American edition was published by Harcourt, Brace & Co. This edition was reprinted with an errata sheet circa 1938. This edition is out-of-print.
- In 1947, a U.S. edition edited by Fred Reinfeld derived from Harcourt, Brace & Co. and published by David McKay Co.; reprinted 1950 (undated), 1967, 1970, 1972 under the imprimatur of Tartan Books, and in a 1975 paperback in the 'McKay Chess Library.' Translated by Philip Hereford (1929). The translator notes the addition of several games, and the removal (with author's permission) of several passages, from the German edition.
- In 1958 Engelhardt, Berlin reprinted the 1925 edition with an additional biography by Dr. Jacques Hannak. In 1965 there was a second printing. This edition is out-of-print.
- In 1987, B.T Batsford Ltd, London reprinted the 1929 edition by Philip Hereford, entitled My System A Chess treatise by Aron Nimzowitsch. (ISBN 0-7134-5655-8)
- In 1991, an American English edition titled My System: 21st Century Edition (ISBN 1-880673-85-1), edited by Lou Hays, was published by Hays Publishing. In this edition, descriptive notation used in previous English editions was replaced by algebraic notation and many diagrams have been added.
- In 2007, a British edition titled My System, newly translated by Ian Adams, published by Quality Chess (ISBN 91-976005-3-9) It includes an essay by Nimzowitsch, tables of his chess results, and other new material.
- In 2007, the first edition in portuguese titled ' 'Meu Sistema' ', translated by Francisco Garcez Leme, published by 'Editora Solis, Brasil'.
- In 2009, a German edition titled Mein System, published by Rattmann (ISBN 3-88086-117-X).
- In 2009, a Spanish edition titled Mi sistema, translated by Antonio Gude. Ed. 'La Casa del Ajedrez'. Madrid (ISBN 978-84-92517-12-1).
- In 2010, a Hebrew edition titled שיטתי, translated by Ram Soffer.
- In 2016, New in Chess published My System & Chess Praxis: His Landmark Classics in One Edition with a new translation by Robert Sherwood. (ISBN 9789056916602)
- In 2024, the FastTrack edition titled Nimzovich's My System, FastTrack Edition edited by GM Alex Fishbein.

== Impact ==
Grandmaster Julio Becerra wrote that the book is regarded as "one of the most important chess books of all time" and created an "enormous" contribution to chess theory, including influencing a young Tigran Petrosian. Similarly, International Master John Watson noted that book, though containing material obvious to a modern reader, actually popularized strategic ideas like prophylaxis and pawn chains which have become commonplace today.
