= Aron Nimzowitsch =

Danish chess player and writer (1886–1935)

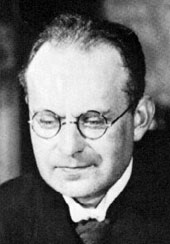
- Born: 7 November 1886; Riga, Governorate of Livonia, Russian Empire
- Died: 16 March 1935 (aged 48); Copenhagen, Denmark
- Citizenship: Russian Empire (until 1917); Stateless (1917–1922); Denmark (1922–1935)
- Occupation: Chess player
- Notable work: My System

Aron Nimzowitsch (Latvian: Ārons Nimcovičs; Russian: Аро́н Иса́евич Нимцо́вич, romanized: Aron Isayevich Nimtsovich; 7 November 1886 – 16 March 1935) was a Russian-born Danish chess player and writer. In the late 1920s, Nimzowitsch was one of the best chess players in the world. He was the foremost figure amongst the hypermoderns and wrote a very influential book on chess theory: My System (1925–1927). Nimzowitsch's seminal work Chess Praxis, originally published in Germany, in 1929, was purchased by a pre-teen and future World Champion Tigran Petrosian and was to have a great influence on his development as a chess player.

== Life ==
Born in Riga, then part of the Russian Empire, the Jewish Yiddish-speaking Nimzowitsch came from a wealthy family, where he learned chess from his father Shaya Abramovich Nimzowitsch (1860, Pinsk – 1918), who was a timber merchant. By 1897, the family lived in Dvinsk. Mother's name: Esphir Nohumovna Nimzowitsch (born Rabinovich, 1865, Polotsk – 1937), sister – Tsilya-Kreyna Pevzner, brothers Yakov, Osey and Benno. In 1904, he travelled to Berlin to study philosophy, but set aside his studies soon and began a career as a professional chess player that same year. He won his first international tournament at Munich 1906. Then, he tied for first with Alexander Alekhine at Saint Petersburg 1913/14 (the eighth All-Russian Masters' Tournament).

During the 1917 Russian Revolution, Nimzowitsch was in the Baltic war zone. He escaped being drafted into one of the armies by feigning madness, insisting that a fly was on his head. He then escaped to Berlin, and gave his first name as Arnold, possibly to avoid anti-Semitic persecution.

Nimzowitsch eventually moved to Copenhagen in 1922, where he lived for the rest of his life in one small rented room. In Copenhagen, he won the Nordic Championship twice, in 1924 and in 1934. He obtained Danish citizenship and lived in Denmark until his death in 1935.

== Chess career ==
The height of Nimzowitsch's career was the late 1920s and early 1930s. Chessmetrics places him as the third best player in the world from 1927 to 1931, behind Alexander Alekhine and José Capablanca. His most notable successes were first-place finishes at Copenhagen 1923, Marienbad 1925, Dresden 1926, Hanover 1926, the Carlsbad 1929 chess tournament, and second place behind Alekhine at the San Remo 1930 chess tournament. Nimzowitsch never developed a knack for match play, though; his best match success was a draw with Alekhine, but the match consisted of only two games and took place in 1914, thirteen years before Alekhine became world champion.

Nimzowitsch never beat Capablanca (+0−5=6), but fared better against Alekhine (+3−9=9). He even beat Alekhine with the black pieces, in their short 1914 match at St. Petersburg. One of Nimzowitsch's most famous games is his celebrated immortal zugzwang game against Sämisch at Copenhagen 1923. Another game on this theme is his win over Paul Johner at Dresden 1926. When in form, Nimzowitsch was very dangerous with the black pieces, scoring many fine wins over top players.

== Legacy ==
Nimzowitsch is considered one of the most important players and writers in chess history. His works influenced numerous other players, including Savielly Tartakower, Milan Vidmar, Richard Réti, Akiba Rubinstein, Mikhail Botvinnik, Bent Larsen, Viktor Korchnoi and Tigran Petrosian, and his influence is still felt today.

He wrote three books on chess strategy: Mein System (My System), 1925; Die Praxis meines Systems (The Practice of My System), 1929, commonly known as Chess Praxis; and Die Blockade (The Blockade), 1925, although much in this book is generally held to be a rehash of material already presented in Mein System. Mein System is considered to be one of the most influential chess books of all time. It sets out Nimzowitsch's most important ideas, while his second most influential work, Chess Praxis, elaborates upon these ideas, adds a few new ones, and has immense value as a stimulating collection of Nimzowitsch's own games accompanied by his idiosyncratic, hyperbolic commentary which is often as entertaining as instructive.

Nimzowitsch's chess theories, when first propounded, flew in the face of widely held orthodoxies enunciated by the dominant theorist of the era, Siegbert Tarrasch, and his disciples. Tarrasch's rigid generalizations drew on the earlier work of Wilhelm Steinitz, and were upheld by Tarrasch's sharp tongue when dismissing the opinions of doubters. While the greatest players of the time, among them Alekhine, Emanuel Lasker and Capablanca, clearly did not allow their play to be hobbled by blind adherence to general concepts that the center had to be controlled by pawns, that development had to happen in support of this control, that rooks always belong on open files, that wing openings were unsound—core ideas of Tarrasch's chess philosophy as popularly understood—beginners were taught to think of these generalizations as unalterable principles.

Nimzowitsch supplemented many of the earlier simplistic assumptions about chess strategy by enunciating in his turn a further number of general concepts of defensive play aimed at achieving one's own goals by preventing realization of the opponent's plans. Notable in his "system" were concepts such as overprotection of pieces and pawns under attack, control of the center by pieces instead of pawns, blockading of opposing pieces (notably the passed pawns) and prophylaxis. His aforementioned game versus Paul Johner in 1926 (listed in the notable games below) is a great example of Nimzowitsch's concept of 'first restrain, then blockade and finally destroy'. He manoeuvres the black queen from its starting point to h7 to form a part of king-side blockade along with the knight on f6 and h-pawn to stop any attacking threats from White. He was also a leading exponent of the fianchetto development of bishops. Perhaps most importantly, he formulated the terminology still in use for various complex chess strategies. Others had used these ideas in practice, but he was the first to present them systematically as a lexicon of themes accompanied by extensive taxonomical observations.

Raymond Keene writes that Nimzowitsch "was one of the world's leading grandmasters for a period extending over a quarter of a century, and for some of that time he was the obvious challenger for the world championship. ... [He was also] a great and profound chess thinker second only to Steinitz, and his works – Die Blockade, My System and Chess Praxis – established his reputation as one of the father figures of modern chess." GM Robert Byrne called him "perhaps the most brilliant theoretician and teacher in the history of the game." GM Jan Hein Donner called Nimzowitsch "a man who was too much of an artist to be able to prove he was right and who was regarded as something of a madman in his time. He would be understood only long after his death."

Many chess openings and variations are named after Nimzowitsch, the most famous being the Nimzo-Indian Defence (1.d4 Nf6 2.c4 e6 3.Nc3 Bb4) and the less often played Nimzowitsch Defence (1.e4 Nc6). Nimzowitsch biographer GM Raymond Keene and others have referred to 1.Nf3 followed by 2.b3 as the Nimzowitsch–Larsen Attack. Keene wrote a book about the opening with that title. These openings all exemplify Nimzowitsch's ideas about controlling the center with pieces instead of pawns. He was also vital in the development of two important systems in the French Defence, the Winawer Variation (in some places called the Nimzowitsch Variation; its moves are 1.e4 e6 2.d4 d5 3.Nc3 Bb4) and the Advance Variation (1.e4 e6 2.d4 d5 3.e5). He also pioneered two provocative variations of the Sicilian Defence: the Nimzowitsch Variation, 1.e4 c5 2.Nf3 Nf6, which invites 3.e5 Nd5 (similar to Alekhine's Defence) and 1.e4 c5 2.Nf3 Nc6 3.d4 cxd4 4.Nxd4 d5?! (the latter regarded as dubious today). International Master John L. Watson has dubbed the line 1.c4 Nf6 2.Nc3 e6 3.Nf3 Bb4 the "Nimzo-English", employing this designation in Chapter 11 of his book Mastering the Chess Openings, Volume 3.

== Personality ==
There are many entertaining anecdotes regarding Nimzowitsch—some less savory than others. An article by Hans Kmoch and Fred Reinfeld entitled "Unconventional Surrender" on page 55 of the February 1950 Chess Review tells of the "... example of Nimzowitsch, who ... once missed first prize in a tournament in Berlin by losing to Sämisch, and when it became clear he was going to lose the game, Nimzowitsch stood up on the table and shouted, 'Gegen diesen Idioten muss ich verlieren!' ('I must lose to this idiot!')".

Nimzowitsch was annoyed by his opponents' smoking. A popular, but probably apocryphal, story is that once when an opponent laid an unlit cigar on the table, he complained to the tournament arbiters, "He is threatening to smoke, and as an old player you must know that the threat is stronger than the execution."

Nimzowitsch had lengthy and somewhat bitter dogmatic conflicts with Tarrasch over whose ideas constituted 'proper' chess.

Nimzowitsch's vanity and faith in his ideas of overprotection inspired Hans Kmoch to write a parody about him in February 1928 in the Wiener Schachzeitung. This consisted of a mock game against the fictional player "Systemsson", supposedly played and annotated by Nimzowitsch himself. The annotations gleefully exaggerate the idea of overprotection, as well as asserting the true genius of the wondrous idea. Kmoch was in fact a great admirer of Nimzowitsch, and Nimzowitsch was amused at the effort.

Kmoch also wrote an article about his nine years with Nimzowitsch:

Nimzovich suffered from the delusion that he was unappreciated and that the reason was malice. All it took to make him blossom, as I later learned, was a little praise. His paranoia was most evident when he dined in company. He always thought he was served much smaller portions than everyone else. He didn't care about the actual amount but only about the imagined affront. I once suggested that he and I order what the other actually wanted and, when the food was served, exchange plates. After we had done so, he shook his head in disbelief, still thinking that he had received the smaller portion.

Nimzowitsch's colleague Tartakower observed of him, "He pretends to be crazy in order to drive us all crazy."

== Death ==
Although he had long suffered from heart trouble, his early death was unexpected; taken ill suddenly at the end of 1934, he lay bedridden for three months before dying of pneumonia. He is buried in Bispebjerg Cemetery in Copenhagen.

== Notable games ==
Sämisch vs. Nimzowitsch, Copenhagen 1923

Position: h1 white king, g1 white rook, e1 white rook, b1 white knight, g2 white bishop, f2 black rook, d2 white bishop, b2 white pawn, a2 white pawn, h3 white pawn, g3 white pawn, e3 white queen, d3 black bishop, e4 black pawn, d4 white pawn, b4 black pawn, f5 black rook, d5 black pawn, h6 black pawn, e6 black pawn, d6 black bishop, a6 black pawn, g7 black pawn, d7 black queen, g8 black king

Final position; "[25... h6!! is] a brilliant move which announces the Zugzwang. White has not a move left. If, e.g., Kh2 or g4, then R5f3. Black can now make waiting moves with his King, and White must, willy-nilly, eventually throw himself upon the sword."
- Friedrich Sämisch vs Aron Nimzowitsch, Copenhagen 1923, 0–1 The "Immortal Zugzwang Game"
- Paul Johner vs Aron Nimzowitsch, Dresden 1926, 0–1 This game was chosen by Bent Larsen as his favourite game in Learn from the Grandmasters.
- Richard Réti vs Aron Nimzowitsch, Berlin 1928, 0–1
- Efim Bogoljubov vs Aron Nimzowitsch, San Remo 1930, 0–1

== See also ==
- List of chess games
- List of Jewish chess players
