= Richard Réti =

Czechoslovak chess player (1889–1929)

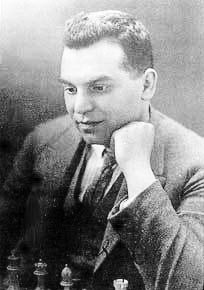

Personal information
- Born: 28 May 1889 Pezinok, Austria-Hungary
- Died: 6 June 1929 (aged 40) Prague, Czechoslovakia

Chess career
- Country: Czechoslovakia (after 1918); Kingdom of Hungary (before 1918)

Richard Réti (28 May 1889 – 6 June 1929) was an Austro-Hungarian and later Czechoslovak chess player, chess author and composer of endgame studies.

He was one of the principal proponents of hypermodernism in chess. With the exception of Nimzowitsch's book My System, he is considered to be the movement's foremost literary contributor.

== Early life ==
Réti was born to a Jewish family in Bazin, Austria-Hungary (now Pezinok, Slovakia), where his father worked as a medical doctor in the service of the Austrian military.

His older brother Rudolph Reti (who did not use the acute accent) was a noted pianist, musical theorist, and composer. He is the great-grandfather of the German painter Elias Maria Reti. Réti came to Vienna to study mathematics at Vienna University.

== Chess career ==
One of the top players in the world during the 1910s and 1920s, he began his career as a combinative classical player, favoring openings such as the King's Gambit (1.e4 e5 2.f4). After the end of the First World War, however, his playing style changed, and he became one of the principal proponents of hypermodernism, along with Aron Nimzowitsch and others. He had his greatest early successes in the period 1918 through 1921, in tournaments in Kaschau (Košice; 1918), Rotterdam (1919), Amsterdam (1920), Vienna (1920), and Gothenburg (1921).

In 1925 Réti set a world record for blindfold chess with 29 games played simultaneously. He won 21, drew 6, and lost 2.

Réti was also a notable composer of endgame studies.

== Death ==
Réti died on 6 June 1929 in Prague of scarlet fever. His ashes are buried in the grave of Réti's father, Dr. Samuel Réti, in the Jewish section of the Zentralfriedhof in Vienna, in Section T1, Group 51, Row 5, Grave 34.

== Legacy ==
The Réti Opening (1.Nf3 d5 2.c4) is named after him.

Réti defeated World Champion José Raúl Capablanca in the New York 1924 chess tournament in 31 moves – Capablanca's first defeat in eight years, his only loss to Réti, and his first since becoming world champion. This tournament was also the only occasion in which Réti beat future world champion Alexander Alekhine, accomplishing this feat in the same number of moves.

Réti's writings have become classics of chess literature. Modern Ideas in Chess (1923) and Masters of the Chess Board (1933) are studied today.

=== Famous endgame study ===
Richard Réti, 1921

Position: h8 white king, a6 black king, c6 white pawn, h5 black pawn

White to move and draw

Réti composed one of the most famous chess studies, shown in this diagram. It was published in Ostrauer Morgenzeitung 4 December 1921. It seems impossible for the white king to catch the advanced black pawn, while the white pawn can be easily stopped by the black king. The idea of the solution is to move the king to advance on both pawns at the same time using specific properties of the chess geometry.

1. Kg7! h4 2. Kf6 Kb6
Or 2...h3 3.Ke7 and the white king can support its own pawn.
3. Ke5!!
And now the white king comes just in time to the white pawn, or catches the black one.
3... h3 4. Kd6 and draws.

== Publications ==
- Modern Ideas In Chess (1923) Complete Transcription
- Masters Of The Chess Board (1933) ISBN 0-486-23384-7

== Notable games ==
- Réti vs. Akiba Rubinstein, Karlsbad 1923, King's Indian Attack (A11), 1–0 A model game for Réti-type opening.
- Réti vs. Jose Raul Capablanca, New York 1924, English Opening: Anglo-Indian Defense. (A15), 1–0 The famous victory over Capablanca.
- Réti vs. Alexander Alekhine, New York 1924, Indian Game: London System (A48), 1–0 Réti's only victory over Alekhine.
- Réti vs. Efim Bogoljubov, New York 1924, English Opening (A13), 1–0 Alexander Alekhine praised the "sparkling conclusion". The game won the tournament's brilliancy prize.

A collection of his games was published as Reti's Games of Chess, annotated by H. Golombek, republished by Dover (1974).

== See also ==
- List of Jewish chess players
