= Savielly Tartakower =

Polish-French chess grandmaster (1887–1956)

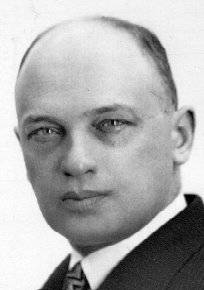

Personal information
- Born: 21 February 1887 Rostov-on-Don, Russian Empire
- Died: 4 February 1956 (aged 68) Paris, France

Chess career
- Country: Austro-Hungarian Empire (until 1918); Poland (1918–1948); France (1948–1956)
- Title: Grandmaster (1950)

Savielly Tartakower (also known as Xavier or Ksawery Tartakower, less often Tartacover or Tartakover; 21 February 1887 – 4 February 1956) was a chess player who was awarded the title of International Grandmaster in its inaugural year, 1950. He was also a chess journalist and author during the 1920s and 1930s, and was noted for his many witticisms.

He was Austro-Hungarian by birth, later becoming first a Polish and later a naturalised French citizen.

During World War II, Tartakower joined the French Resistance under the name "Lieutenant Cartier".

== Early career and Education ==
Tartakower was born on 9 (21) February 1887 in Rostov-on-Don, Russia, to Austrian citizens of Jewish origin and circumcised on February 16 (28). His parents were killed in 1911 during a break-in in their house in Rostov-on-Don, where his father, a relatively wealthy businessman, owned a textile factory (or, according to some sources, a series of stores).

Tartakower stayed mainly in Austria. He graduated from the law faculties of universities in Geneva and Vienna. He spoke German and French. During his studies he became interested in chess and started attending chess meetings in various cafés for chess players in Vienna. He met many notable masters of the time, among them Carl Schlechter, Géza Maróczy (against whom he played what was probably his most famous brilliancy), Milan Vidmar, and Richard Réti. His first achievement was first place in a tournament in Nuremberg in 1906. Three years later he achieved second place in the tournament in Vienna, losing only to Réti.

During World War I Tartakower was drafted into the Austro-Hungarian army and served as a staff officer on various posts. He went to the Russian front with the Viennese infantry house-regiment.

After the war he emigrated to France, and settled in Paris. Although Tartakower did not speak Polish, after Poland regained its independence in 1918 he accepted Polish citizenship and became one of the country's most prominent honorary ambassadors. He was the captain and trainer of the Polish chess team in six international tournaments, winning a gold medal for Poland at the Hamburg Olympiad in 1930.

== Chess professional ==
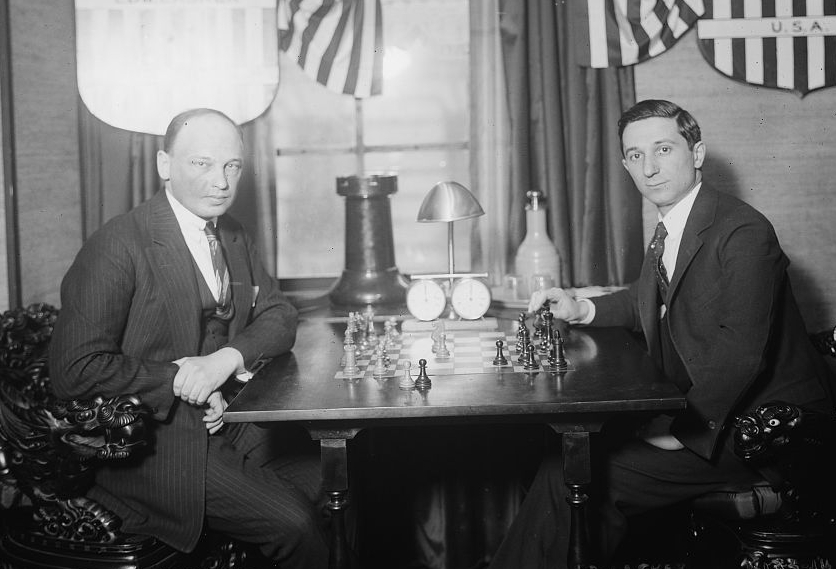
Tartakower (left) with Edward Lasker, c. 1924

In France, Tartakower decided to become a professional chess player. Alongside other grandmasters like the Danish Aron Nimzowitsch and Czechoslovak Richard Réti, he was a leading figure in hypermodernism and was not afraid to play so-called “irregular” openings, such as the Dutch Defense.

He also started cooperating with various chess magazines, and wrote several books and brochures on chess. The most famous of these, Die Hypermoderne Schachpartie (The Hypermodern Chess Game) was published in 1924 and has been issued in almost 100 editions since. Tartakower took part in many of the most important chess tournaments of his day. In 1927 and 1928 he won two tournaments in Hastings and shared first place with Aron Nimzowitsch in London. On the latter occasion, he defeated such notable players as Frank Marshall, Milan Vidmar, and Efim Bogoljubov. In 1930 he won the Liège tournament, beating Mir Sultan Khan by two points. Further down the list were, among others, Akiba Rubinstein, Nimzowitsch, and Marshall.

Tartakower won the Polish Chess Championship twice, at Warsaw 1935 and Jurata 1937. In the 1930s he represented Poland in six Chess Olympiads, and France in 1950, winning three individual medals (gold in 1931 and bronze in 1933 and 1935), as well as five team medals (gold in 1930, two silver in 1931 and 1939, and two bronze in 1935 and 1937).

- In 1930, at second board at the 3rd Chess Olympiad in Hamburg (+9−1=6);
- In 1931, at second board at the 4th Chess Olympiad in Prague (+10−1=7);
- In 1933, at first board at the 5th Chess Olympiad in Folkestone (+6−2=6);
- In 1935, at first board at the 6th Chess Olympiad in Warsaw (+6−0=11);
- In 1937, at first board at the 7th Chess Olympiad in Stockholm (+1−2=10);
- In 1939, at first board at the 8th Chess Olympiad in Buenos Aires (+7−3=7);
- In 1950, at first board at the 9th Chess Olympiad in Dubrovnik (+5−5=5).

In 1935 he was one of the main organizers of the Chess Olympiad in Warsaw.

In 1939, the outbreak of World War II found him in Buenos Aires, where he was playing the 8th Chess Olympiad, representing Poland on a team which included Miguel Najdorf, who always called Tartakower "my teacher".

== Final years ==
After a short stay in Argentina Tartakower returned to Europe. He arrived in France shortly before its collapse in 1940. Under the pseudonym Cartier, he joined the forces of general Charles de Gaulle.

After World War II and the Soviet takeover of Poland, Tartakower became a French citizen. He played in the first Interzonal tournament at Saltsjöbaden 1948, but did not qualify for the Candidates tournament. He represented France at the 1950 Chess Olympiad. FIDE instituted the title of International Grandmaster in 1950; Tartakower was in the first group of players to receive it. In 1953, he won the French Chess Championship in Paris.

He died on 4 February 1956 in Paris, 17 days before his 69th birthday.

== Personality ==
Tartakower is regarded as one of the most notable chess personalities of his time. Harry Golombek translated Tartakower's book of his best games, and in the foreword wrote:

Dr. Tartakower is far and away the most cultured and the wittiest of all the chess masters I have ever met. His extremely well stored mind and ever-flowing native wit make conversation with him a perpetual delight. So much so that I count it as one of the brightest attractions an international tournament can hold out for me that Dr. Tartakower should also be one of the participants. His talk and thought are rather like a modernized blend of Baruch Spinoza and Voltaire; and with it all a dash of paradoxical originality that is essential Tartakower.

Despite his sharp mind, he was superstitious, like many chess players, and had a habit of carrying a particularly ugly old hat from tournament to tournament. He only wore it during the final round, and he always won.

However, the hat did not bring him luck at the casinos he frequented relentlessly. Gambling (and more specifically, his gambling addiction) led to Tartakower’s financial ruin: like David Janowski, his tournament winnings ended up in casino coffers after nights spent at the roulette table.

Despite his outwardly friendly and humorous demeanor, Tartakower was known for having a difficult temper, which led to conflicts with others and periods of social isolation.

His colleague nicknamed him as "Tartacaviar".

== Chess contributions ==
A talented chess player, Tartakower is also known for his countless aphorisms, sometimes called Tartakoverisms.

Position: a8 black rook, b8 black knight, c8 black bishop, d8 black queen, e8 black king, f8 black bishop, h8 black rook, a7 black pawn, b7 black pawn, c7 black pawn, d7 black pawn, e7 black pawn, g7 black pawn, h7 black pawn, f6 black knight, d4 white pawn, e4 black pawn, g4 white pawn, c3 white knight, a2 white pawn, b2 white pawn, c2 white pawn, f2 white pawn, h2 white pawn, a1 white rook, c1 white bishop, d1 white queen, e1 white king, f1 white bishop, g1 white knight, h1 white rook

Dutch Defence, Staunton Gambit, Tartakower Variation: 1.d4 f5 2.e4 fxe4 3.Nc3 Nf6 4.g4

One variation of the Dutch Defence is named after him. The Tartakower Defence in the Queen's Gambit Declined (also known as the Tartakower–Makogonov–Bondarevsky System) also bears his name, as does the most common variation of the Torre Attack.

He is alleged to be the inventor of the Orangutan Opening, 1.b4, so named after Tartakower had admired a great ape during his visit to the zoo whilst playing in the great 1924 tournament in New York. Tartakower originated the Catalan Opening at Barcelona 1929. This system starts with 1.d4 Nf6 2.c4 e6 3.g3. It remains very popular today at all levels. Also, a counterplay-focused variation in the Caro–Kann Defence, which starts with 1.e4 c6 2.d4 d5 3.Nc3 dxe4 4.Nxe4 Nf6 5.Nxf6+ exf6 is named after Tartakower.

José Raúl Capablanca scored +5−0=7 against Tartakower, but they had many hard fights. After their fighting draw in London 1922 (where Tartakower played his new defense), Capablanca said, "You are lacking in solidity", and Tartakower replied in his usual banter, "That is my saving grace." But in Capablanca's reports of the 1939 Chess Olympiad in Buenos Aires for the Argentine newspaper Crítica, he wrote:

The Polish team … is captained and led by Dr S. Tartakower, a master with profound knowledge and great imagination, qualities which make him a formidable adversary. … Luckily for the others, the Polish team has only one Tartakower.

Sugden and Damsky stated that like other chess players of all ages and ranks among whom there is generally no lack of idiosyncrasy or superstition, Tartakower, a trenchant wit, took a most unsightly old hat with him from tournament to tournament.

He would only wear it on the last round and he would win. Notably this hat did not guarantee him success in casinos, which he visited as though it were a job of work. The roulette table would regularly acquire both the Grandmaster's prizes and the numerous fees from his endless string of articles.

== Quotations ==
Several chess witticisms are attributed to Tartakower:

- "It's always better to sacrifice your opponent's men."
- "An isolated pawn spreads gloom all over the chessboard."
- "The blunders are all there on the board, waiting to be made."
- "The winner of the game is the player who makes the next-to-last mistake."
- "The move is there, but you must see it." (Horowitz 1971:137)
- "No game was ever won by resigning."
- "I never defeated a healthy opponent." (This refers to players who blame an illness, sometimes imaginary, for their loss.)
- "Tactics is what you do when there is something to do; strategy is what you do when there is nothing to do."
- "Moral victories do not count."
- "Chess is a fairy tale of 1001 blunders."
- "The great master places a knight on e5; checkmate follows by itself."
- "A master can sometimes play badly, a fan never!"
- "A match demonstrates less than a tournament. But a tournament demonstrates nothing at all."
- "Chess is a struggle against one's own errors."
- "Every chessplayer should have a hobby."
- "A game of chess has three phases: the opening, where you hope you stand better; the middlegame, where you think you stand better; and the ending, where you know you stand to lose."
- "As long as an opening is reputed to be weak it can be played."
- "Stalemate is the tragicomedy of chess."
- "Erro, ergo sum." (I fail, therefore I am)
- Talking about 1.Nf3 Réti Opening: "An opening of the past, which became, towards 1923, the opening of the future."
- "To avoid losing a piece, many a person has lost the game."
- "A draw can be obtained normally by repeating three moves, but also by playing one bad move."
- "Some part of a mistake is always correct."
- "Whenever you have to make a rook move, and both rooks are available for said move, you should evaluate which rook to move and, once you have made up your mind, move the other one."
- "The player that takes risks may lose, the player that doesn't always loses."
- "Everything was finely imagined; but the gods, before the endgame, put the middlegame."

== Writings ==
- 500 Master Games of Chess by Savielly Tartakower and Julius du Mont, Dover Publications, June 1, 1975, ISBN 0-486-23208-5. (Previously published in two volumes by G. Bell & Sons, 1952.)
- 100 Master Games of Modern Chess by Savielly Tartakower and Julius du Mont, Dover Publications, June 1, 1975, ISBN 0-486-20317-4. (Previously published by G. Bell & Sons, 1955.)
- Bréviaire des échecs, one of the best known introductory texts for chess in the French language. (English edition: A Breviary of Chess, translated by J. Du Mont, London: George Rutledge & Sones, Ltd.,1937)
- Die hypermoderne Schachpartie by Savielly Tartakower, published in German by Wiener Schachzeitung in 1924 (English translation of the second edition: The Hypermodern Game of Chess, translated by Jared Becker, Russell Enterprises, 2015)
- My Best Games of Chess 1905–1954 by S.G. Tartakower, Dover Publications, 1985, ISBN 0-486-24807-0. The definitive recollection of Tartakower's career, written in his unique style; translated by Harry Golombek.

== Notable games ==
- Rudolf Spielmann vs Savielly Tartakower, Copenhagen 1923, Caro–Kann Defense: Exchange Variation (B13), 0–1
- Savielly Tartakower vs Akiba Rubinstein, Moscow International Tournament 1925, Bishop's Opening: Vienna Hybrid (C28), 1–0
- Savielly Tartakower vs Jacques Mieses, Baden-Baden 1925, Dutch Defense: Staunton Gambit, Tartakower Variation (A82), 1–0
- Alexander Alekhine vs Savielly Tartakower, Folkestone ol 1933, Queen's Gambit Declined: Tartakower Defense, (D58), 0–1

== See also ==
- Hypermodernism
- List of Jewish chess players
