= Prophylaxis (chess) =

Series of moves done by a player to prevent their opponent from taking some action

In chess, prophylaxis consists of a move or series of moves done by a player to prevent their opponent from taking some action. Such preventive moves, or prophylactic moves, aim not only to improve one's position but also to restrict the opponent in improving their own.

Many standard and widespread opening moves can be considered prophylactic. One common prophylactic idea is the advance of the rook pawn near a castled king, which can be done to provide a luft and/or to prevent a pin, such as playing a6 or h6. Another is to transfer one's king to the b-file after castling queenside so as to protect an unmoved a-pawn, among other purposes, namely Kb1/Kb8.

Prophylaxis is a distinctive feature of positional play, often preventing opponents from entering risky, double-edged lines, as well as punishing opponents who play too aggressively. Using prophylaxis is an essential skill at advanced levels of play. Famous practitioners of prophylactic play include Aron Nimzowitsch, Tigran Petrosian, and Anatoly Karpov; even tactical players, such as Mikhail Tal and Garry Kasparov, make use of prophylaxis.

== Etymology ==
The term prophylaxis comes from the Greek προφύλαξις, profýlaxis, "guarding or preventing beforehand".

== Example ==
Position: a8 black rook, b8 black knight, c8 black bishop, d8 black queen, e8 black king, f8 black bishop, h8 black rook, b7 black pawn, e7 black pawn, f7 black pawn, g7 black pawn, h7 black pawn, a6 black pawn, d6 black pawn, f6 black knight, d4 white knight, e4 white pawn, c3 white knight, a2 white pawn, b2 white pawn, c2 white pawn, f2 white pawn, g2 white pawn, h2 white pawn, a1 white rook, c1 white bishop, d1 white queen, e1 white king, f1 white bishop, h1 white rook

Position after 5...a6

The diagram shows a common opening known as the Sicilian Defense, Najdorf Variation, arising after the moves 1.e4 c5 2.Nf3 d6 3.d4 cxd4 4.Nxd4 Nf6 5.Nc3 a6. Black's fifth move is a prophylactic move that intends to prevent White from placing a knight or bishop on b5.
