= Leopold Löwy Jr. =

Austrian chess player

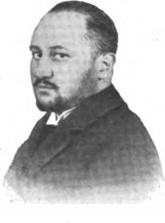
Leopold Löwy Jr.

Leopold Loewy (Löwy) Jr. (25 August 1871 in Vienna – 29 February 1940 in Vienna) was an Austrian chess master.

In 1893/94, he took 12th at Vienna (Jacques Schwarz won). In 1899, he won the Amateur Tournament of the Vienna Chess Club, and took 3rd at Vienna (Adolf Zinkl won). In 1902, he won at Vienna (Quadrangular).

He took 9th place, while his father Leopold Loewy Sr. took 7th at Vienna 1904 (Carl Schlechter won); tied for 3rd-4th at Barmen (C tournament, Akiba Rubinstein and Oldřich Duras won); tied for 2nd-4th, behind Savielly Tartakower, at Nuremberg 1906 (15th DSB–Congress, Hauptturnier).

He died of a suicide (hanging).
