= Vienna 1898 chess tournament =

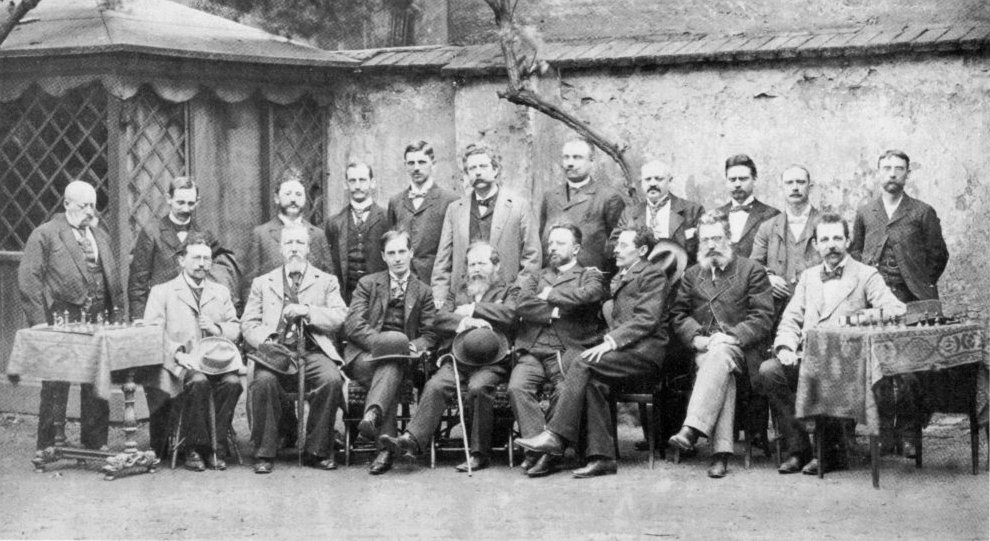
Standing: Schwarz, Schlechter, Fahndrich, Caro, Maróczy, Showalter, Marco, Alapin, Halprin, Baird and Burn Sitting: Tarrasch, Blackburne, Pillsbury, Steinitz, Chigorin, Janowsky, Schiffers and Lipke

The tournament celebrated the fiftieth anniversary of Emperor Franz Joseph I of Austria's accession to the throne of Austria-Hungary. Main organiser was Baron Albert Freiherr von Rothschild who also financed the Vienna tournaments of 1873, 1882, 1903, and 1908. The players visited his Heugasse palace on 31 May 1898. Rounds were played in the clubhouse of the Vienna Chess Club at Schottengasse 7. Hugo Fahndrich was the tournament director at Kaiser Jubiläumsturnier 1898. The time limit was thirty moves in two hours, and fifteen moves per hour after this. Twenty great masters (only Emanuel Lasker and Rudolf Charousek were absent at Kaiser-Jubiläumsturnier) played double rounds from 1 June to 25 July.

Vienna 1898, Kaiser-Jubiläumsturnier
#	Player	1	2	3	4	5	6	7	8	9	10	11	12	13	14	15	16	17	18	19	Total
1	Siegbert Tarrasch (German Empire)	XX	01	10	1½	1½	1½	½1	½½	½1	½1	½½	11	11	11	1½	1½	11	11	1½	27½
2	Harry Pillsbury (United States)	10	XX	10	½1	1½	10	½0	1½	01	½1	11	11	1½	½1	11	11	11	11	11	27½
3	David Janowski (France)	01	01	XX	11	1½	11	1½	00	½½	11	½0	11	1½	11	11	00	½1	11	11	25½
4	Wilhelm Steinitz (United States)	0½	0½	00	XX	½1	10	½½	11	1½	½1	½½	01	11	11	01	1½	1½	11	11	23½
5	Carl Schlechter (Austria-Hungary)	0½	0½	0½	½0	XX	½½	11	½½	½½	½1	0½	1½	½1	1½	11	0½	½1	11	11	21½
6	Mikhail Chigorin (Russian Empire)	0½	10	00	01	½½	XX	10	01	1½	1½	½0	10	01	11	10	11	10	01	11	20
7	Amos Burn (United Kingdom)	½0	½1	0½	½½	00	01	XX	1½	0½	½½	½½	½0	½0	11	01	11	1½	11	11	20
8	Paul Lipke (German Empire)	½½	0½	11	00	½½	10	0½	XX	½½	½½	½0	1½	11	1½	0½	½1	½½	11	½½	19½
9	Géza Maróczy (Austria-Hungary)	½0	10	½½	0½	½½	0½	1½	½½	XX	½½	1½	11	½½	01	0½	01	1½	½½	11	19½
10	Simon Alapin (Russian Empire)	½0	½0	00	½0	½0	½0	½½	½½	½½	XX	½1	1½	11	00	10	11	½1	10	11	18
11	Joseph Henry Blackburne (United Kingdom)	½½	00	½1	½½	1½	½1	½½	½1	0½	½0	XX	½½	½0	0½	½0	½½	00	11	½1	17
12	Emanuel Schiffers (Russian Empire)	00	00	00	10	0½	01	½1	0½	00	0½	½½	XX	0½	1½	11	½1	½1	11	½1	17
13	Georg Marco (Austria-Hungary)	00	0½	0½	00	½0	10	½1	00	½½	00	½1	10	XX	11	½1	1½	½1	½1	10	16½
14	Jackson Showalter (United States)	00	½0	00	00	0½	00	00	0½	10	11	1½	01	00	XX	½1	11	11	01	10	15
15	Carl August Walbrodt (German Empire)	0½	00	00	10	00	01	10	1½	1½	01	½1	00	½0	½0	XX	00	11	½0	11	14½
16	Alexander Halprin (Austria-Hungary)	0½	00	11	0½	1½	00	00	½0	10	00	½½	½0	0½	00	11	XX	½½	1½	½1	14
17	Horatio Caro (German Empire)	00	00	½0	0½	½0	01	0½	½½	0½	½0	11	½0	½0	00	00	½½	XX	11	½1	12½
18	David Graham Baird (United States)	00	00	00	00	00	10	00	00	½½	01	00	00	½0	10	½1	0½	00	XX	½1	8
19	Herbert William Trenchard (United Kingdom)	0½	00	00	00	00	00	00	½½	00	00	½0	½0	01	00	00	½0	½0	½0	XX	5

Adolf Schwarz withdrew after playing eight games.

Tarrasch and Pillsbury ended equal after two cycles and had to play an extra play-off match. The additional games were played from 27 until 30 July 1898.

Vienna 1898, Play-off
#	Player	1	2	3	4	Total
1	Siegbert Tarrasch	1	0	1	½	2½
2	Harry Pillsbury	0	1	0	½	1½

Tarrasch won 6000 Kronen and Pillsbury won 4400 Kronen.

== Literature ==
- Hugo Fähndrich, Internationales Kaiser-Jubiläums-Schachturnier, 1981, ISBN 3-283-00057-3 (in German)
