= Alexander Halprin =

Russian-Austrian chess player (1868–1921)

Alexander Halprin (21 March 1868 in Saint Petersburg – 20 May 1921 in Vienna) was a Russian–Austrian chess master.

He took 6th at Vienna 1895/96 (Carl Schlechter and Max Weiss won), lost a match to Kalikst Morawski (+7 –2 =1) at Vienna 1896, tied for 3rd–4th at Vienna 1897/98 (Georg Marco won), took 16th at Vienna 1898 (Siegbert Tarrasch and Harry Pillsbury won), Halprin, Marco, and Hugo Fähndrich were the editors of Wiener Schachzeitung which published supplements containing tourney games and notes throughout the whole contest. He also took 6th at Vienna 1900 (Schlechter won), and took 13th at Munich 1900 (the 12th DSB Congress, Pillsbury, Schlechter and Géza Maróczy won).
