= Hugo Fähndrich =

Austrian-Hungarian chess player

Hugo Fähndrich (3 July 1851 – 3 July 1930) was an Austrian–Hungarian chess master.

Born in Hungary, he moved to Vienna. In 19th/20th century, the Viennese chess school, founded by Max Weiss, was propagated by the Carl Schlechter–Arthur Kaufmann–Hugo Fahndrich trio.

He was the tournament director at Kaiser Jubiläumsturnier 1898 in Vienna. In 1898 he, along with Alexander Halprin and Georg Marco, renewed Wiener Schachzeitung.

He played several tournaments in Vienna; took 3rd in 1896 (Marco won), took 4th in 1897 (Schlechter won), took 9th in 1897/98 (Marco won).

== Notable chess games ==
- Hugo Fähndrich vs Wilhelm Steinitz, Vienna 1897, Bishop's Opening, Urusov Gambit (C24), 1-0
- Carl Schlechter vs Hugo Fähndrich, Vienna 1904, Ruy Lopez, Open Variation (C80), 0-1
- Oldřich Duras vs Hugo Fähndrich, Vienna 1909, Danish Gambit, Accepted (C21), ½–½

== Literature ==
Hugo Fähndrich: Internationales Kaiser-Jubiläums-Schachturnier, 1981, ISBN 3-283-00057-3
