= Kalikst Morawski =

Polish chess player

Kalikst von Morawski (1859 – after 17 September 1939) was a Polish chess master.

Born in a village Boryszkowce (Боришківці), Galicia (then Austria-Hungary, next Poland, now Ukraine), he studied law in the Lviv University from 1877 to 1884. He moved to Stanislau in 1893, and lived there until 1914, working in the state treasure's office. Soon after World War I had broken out, he went to Vienna. In 1915, he came back to Stanislau, and then settled in Lemberg (Lwów, Lviv). After the war, he became an honorary president of the Lviv Chess Club. He died probably during the Soviet occupation of Lviv (1939–1941) or his exile to Siberia.

He took 2nd, behind Ignatz von Popiel, at Lviv 1895, drew a match with Max Judd (+4 –4 =0) and defeated Alexander Halprin (+7 –2 =1), both at Vienna 1896. Later, during the war, he played casual games at the Café Central in Vienna, among others with Rudolf Spielmann, Richard Réti, Adolf Albin, and Heinrich Wolf, in Autumn 1914. He took 2nd, behind Ernst Grünfeld, in the Vienna Chess Club at Schäuflergasse 2, Vienna in 1914/15, and tied for 2nd-3rd with Josef Krejcik, behind Józef Dominik and ahead of Réti, in Vienna in March 1915 (Quadrangular). He was granted the privilege of adding "von" to his name.

After the war, he won three tournaments in Lwów in 1925 (the Lviv City Championship, the Hetman Chess Club, the Lviv Chess Club). Then he participated in team matches Hetman vs. Lviv CC.
