= Hastings 1895 chess tournament =

Round-robin chess tournament

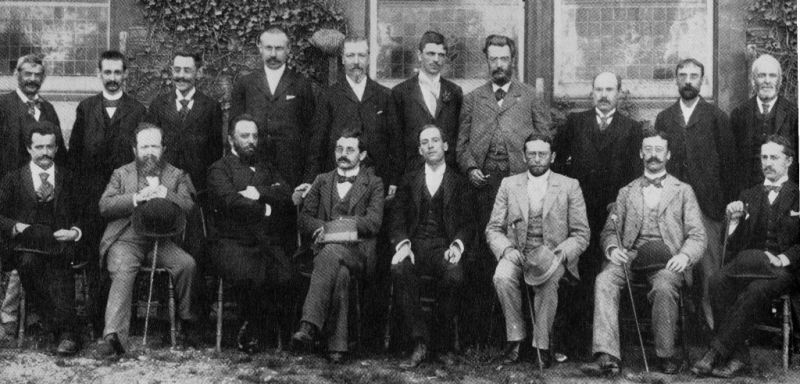
Masters at Hastings 1895 Standing: Albin, Schlechter, Janowski, Marco, Blackburne, Maróczy, Schiffers, Gunsberg, Burn, Tinsley. Seated: Vergani, Steinitz, Chigorin, Lasker, Pillsbury, Tarrasch, Mieses, Teichmann. Not present: von Bardeleben, Mason, Walbrodt, Pollock, Bird

The Hastings 1895 chess tournament was a round-robin tournament of chess conducted at the Brassey Institute in Hastings, England from 5 August to 2 September 1895.

Hastings 1895 was arguably the strongest tournament in history at the time it occurred. All of the top players of the generation competed. It was one of the first times such a "super-tournament" was conducted.

Harry Nelson Pillsbury, a young American unknown in Europe, was the surprise winner with 16½ out of 21 points – ahead of Mikhail Chigorin (16) and world champion Emanuel Lasker (15½). The top five finishers were invited to play in the Saint Petersburg 1895–96 chess tournament.

Following the success of the event, the Hastings tournament would become an annual feature. The organizers and players produced a Book of the Tournament, in which the participants annotated their own games. Like the Tournament, the Book too became an annual feature and was of very high instructional value.

== Tournament crosstable ==
Hastings 1895
| # | Player | 1 | 2 | 3 | 4 | 5 | 6 | 7 | 8 | 9 | 10 | 11 | 12 | 13 | 14 | 15 | 16 | 17 | 18 | 19 | 20 | 21 | 22 | Total |
|---|---|---|---|---|---|---|---|---|---|---|---|---|---|---|---|---|---|---|---|---|---|---|---|---|
| 1 | Harry Pillsbury (United States) | X | 0 | 0 | 1 | 1 | 1 | 1 | 1 | 0 | ½ | ½ | 1 | 1 | 1 | 1 | 1 | 1 | ½ | 1 | 1 | 1 | 1 | 16½ |
| 2 | Mikhail Chigorin (Russian Empire) | 1 | X | 1 | 1 | 0 | 0 | 1 | 1 | 1 | 1 | ½ | 0 | 1 | 1 | 1 | ½ | ½ | 1 | 1 | ½ | 1 | 1 | 16 |
| 3 | Emanuel Lasker (German Empire) | 1 | 0 | X | 0 | 1 | 1 | 0 | 1 | 1 | 0 | 1 | 1 | ½ | 1 | 1 | 1 | ½ | 1 | 1 | ½ | 1 | 1 | 15½ |
| 4 | Siegbert Tarrasch (German Empire) | 0 | 0 | 1 | X | 1 | 1 | ½ | 0 | ½ | 1 | 1 | 1 | 0 | 1 | ½ | 1 | 1 | 1 | 0 | ½ | 1 | 1 | 14 |
| 5 | William Steinitz (United States) | 0 | 1 | 0 | 0 | X | 1 | 1 | ½ | ½ | 1 | 1 | 0 | 1 | ½ | 1 | 0 | 1 | 1 | 0 | ½ | 1 | 1 | 13 |
| 6 | Emanuel Schiffers (Russian Empire) | 0 | 1 | 0 | 0 | 0 | X | ½ | ½ | 0 | 1 | 1 | 1 | ½ | ½ | 1 | 1 | 0 | ½ | 1 | ½ | 1 | 1 | 12 |
| 7 | Curt von Bardeleben (German Empire) | 0 | 0 | 1 | ½ | 0 | ½ | X | ½ | ½ | 0 | 0 | ½ | 1 | 1 | 1 | ½ | ½ | 1 | 1 | 1 | 0 | 1 | 11½ |
| 8 | Richard Teichmann (German Empire) | 0 | 0 | 0 | 1 | ½ | ½ | ½ | X | ½ | 0 | 0 | ½ | 1 | 1 | 0 | 1 | ½ | 1 | ½ | 1 | 1 | 1 | 11½ |
| 9 | Carl Schlechter (Austria) | 1 | 0 | 0 | ½ | ½ | 1 | ½ | ½ | X | ½ | ½ | 0 | 1 | 1 | ½ | ½ | ½ | ½ | ½ | ½ | 1 | 0 | 11 |
| 10 | Joseph Henry Blackburne (England) | ½ | 0 | 1 | 0 | 0 | 0 | 1 | 1 | ½ | X | 0 | 1 | 0 | 1 | 0 | ½ | 1 | 0 | 1 | 0 | 1 | 1 | 10½ |
| 11 | Carl August Walbrodt (German Empire) | ½ | ½ | 0 | 0 | 0 | 0 | 1 | 1 | ½ | 1 | X | 0 | ½ | 0 | ½ | ½ | 0 | ½ | ½ | 1 | 1 | 1 | 10 |
| 12 | David Janowski (France) | 0 | 1 | 0 | 0 | 1 | 0 | ½ | ½ | 1 | 0 | 1 | X | ½ | 0 | 0 | ½ | 0 | 1 | ½ | 1 | 0 | 1 | 9½ |
| 13 | James Mason (England) | 0 | 0 | ½ | 1 | 0 | ½ | 0 | 0 | 0 | 1 | ½ | ½ | X | 1 | 0 | 1 | ½ | 0 | 1 | 1 | 0 | 1 | 9½ |
| 14 | Amos Burn (England) | 0 | 0 | 0 | 0 | ½ | ½ | 0 | 0 | 0 | 0 | 1 | 1 | 0 | X | 0 | ½ | 1 | 1 | 1 | 1 | 1 | 1 | 9½ |
| 15 | Isidor Gunsberg (England) | 0 | 0 | 0 | ½ | 0 | 0 | 0 | 1 | ½ | 1 | ½ | 1 | 1 | 1 | X | 0 | 1 | ½ | 0 | 1 | 0 | 0 | 9 |
| 16 | Henry Bird (England) | 0 | ½ | 0 | 0 | 1 | 0 | ½ | 0 | ½ | ½ | ½ | ½ | 0 | ½ | 1 | X | 1 | ½ | 0 | ½ | ½ | 1 | 9 |
| 17 | Adolf Albin (Romania) | 0 | ½ | ½ | 0 | 0 | 1 | ½ | ½ | ½ | 0 | 1 | 1 | ½ | 0 | 0 | 0 | X | 0 | 0 | 1 | 1 | ½ | 8½ |
| 18 | Georg Marco (Austria) | ½ | 0 | 0 | 0 | 0 | ½ | 0 | 0 | ½ | 1 | ½ | 0 | 1 | 0 | ½ | ½ | 1 | X | 1 | 1 | 0 | ½ | 8½ |
| 19 | William Pollock (Canada) | 0 | 0 | 0 | 1 | 1 | 0 | 0 | ½ | ½ | 0 | ½ | ½ | 0 | 0 | 1 | 1 | 1 | 0 | X | 0 | 0 | 1 | 8 |
| 20 | Jacques Mieses (German Empire) | 0 | ½ | ½ | ½ | ½ | ½ | 0 | 0 | ½ | 1 | 0 | 0 | 0 | 0 | 0 | ½ | 0 | 0 | 1 | X | 1 | 1 | 7½ |
| 21 | Samuel Tinsley (England) | 0 | 0 | 0 | 0 | 0 | 0 | 1 | 0 | 0 | 0 | 0 | 1 | 1 | 0 | 1 | ½ | 0 | 1 | 1 | 0 | X | 1 | 7½ |
| 22 | Beniamino Vergani (Italy) | 0 | 0 | 0 | 0 | 0 | 0 | 0 | 0 | 1 | 0 | 0 | 0 | 0 | 0 | 1 | 0 | ½ | ½ | 0 | 0 | 0 | X | 3 |

== Notable games ==
Many of the games were of high quality and hard-fought. Here are two examples:

=== Steinitz versus von Bardeleben ===
Steinitz vs. von Bardeleben

Position: a8 black rook, c8 black rook, e8 black king, a7 black pawn, b7 black pawn, d7 black queen, e7 black knight, h7 black pawn, f6 black pawn, g6 black pawn, d5 black pawn, g5 white knight, g4 white queen, a2 white pawn, b2 white pawn, f2 white pawn, g2 white pawn, h2 white pawn, c1 white rook, e1 white rook, g1 white king

Position after 21...Ke8

In round ten, the position in the diagram arose after a Giuoco Piano: 1.e4 e5 2.Nf3 Nc6 3.Bc4 Bc5 4.c3 Nf6 5.d4 exd4 6.cxd4 Bb4+ 7.Nc3 d5 8.exd5 Nxd5 9.0-0 Be6 10.Bg5 Be7 11.Bxd5! Bxd5 12.Nxd5 Qxd5 13.Bxe7 Nxe7 14.Re1 f6 15.Qe2 Qd7 16.Rac1 c6?! 17.d5! cxd5 18.Nd4 Kf7 19.Ne6 Rhc8 20.Qg4 g6 21.Ng5+ Ke8. At this point Steinitz played one of the most famous moves in history:

22. Rxe7+!!

Black cannot capture the white rook: 22...Qxe7 23.Rxc8+ Rxc8 24.Qxc8+ Qd8 25.Qxd8+, etc. and White wins with his extra piece; while 22...Kxe7 23.Re1+ Kd6 24.Qb4+ Rc5 25.Re6+! wins as well (the often-mentioned 25.Ne6 doesn't amount to much, for example 25...Rc8 26.Qf4+ Kc6 27.Qa4+ Kd6). White's replies are also limited, however, because Black is threatening mate with ...Rxc1, as well as threatening to capture White's queen and knight. In order to prevent ...Rxc1, Steinitz's rook now "thumbs its nose" at the black king: repeatedly checking right in front of the king, which cannot capture it.

22... Kf8 23. Rf7+ Kg8 24. Rg7+ Kh8 25. Rxh7+!!

This crucial move eliminates the h-pawn and allows White to bring in his queen to attack without ever allowing Black to play ...Rxc1 and mate. Bowing to the inevitable (or perhaps frustrated that even with mate in one, he could not capitalize), von Bardeleben simply left the tournament hall, letting his time run out. Steinitz demonstrated for the spectators how the game might have continued: 25...Kg8 26.Rg7+ Kh8 27.Qh4+ Kxg7 28.Qh7+ Kf8 29.Qh8+ Ke7 30.Qg7+ Ke8 31.Qg8+ Ke7 32.Qf7+ Kd8 33.Qf8+ Qe8 34.Nf7+ Kd7 35.Qd6#

This game won the first brilliancy prize in the tournament.

=== Pillsbury versus Gunsberg ===
Pillsbury vs. Gunsberg

Position: b8 black knight, e7 black king, h7 black pawn, a6 black pawn, e6 black pawn, f6 black pawn, g6 black pawn, b5 black pawn, c5 white pawn, d5 black pawn, d4 white pawn, f4 white pawn, g4 white pawn, d3 white knight, e3 white pawn, a2 white pawn, e2 white king, h2 white pawn

Position after 26...Nb8

The game was played in the last round. Pillsbury was leading the field by half a point. He had assumed that a draw would be enough, and the game therefore opened with the relatively placid Queen's Gambit Declined. Pieces were rapidly traded off the board, reaching the position in the diagram, when Pillsbury realized that Chigorin was winning his game and therefore he would have to win to take clear first.

1.d4 d5 2.c4 c6 3.e3 g6 4.Nc3 Bg7 5.Nf3 Nf6 6.Bd3 0-0 7.Ne5 dxc4 8.Bxc4 Nd5 9.f4 Be6 10.Qb3 b5 11.Bxd5 Bxd5 12.Nxd5 Qxd5 13.Qxd5 cxd5 14.Nd3 Nd7 15.Bd2 Rfc8 16.Ke2 e6 17.Rhc1 Bf8 18.Rxc8 Rxc8 19.Rc1 Rxc1 20.Bxc1 Bd6 21.Bd2 Kf8 22.Bb4 Ke7 23.Bc5 a6 24.b4 f6 25.g4 Bxc5 26.bxc5 Nb8 (diagram) 27.f5! g5 28.Nb4 a5 29.c6! Kd6 30.fxe6! Nxc6 31.Nxc6 Kxc6 32.e4! dxe4 33.d5+ Kd6 34.Ke3 b4 35.Kxe4 a4 36.Kd4 h5 37.gxh5 a3 38.Kc4 f5 39.h6 f4 40.h7 1–0 Black resigned.

=== Jacques Mieses versus Joseph Henry Blackburne ===
In the first round, Jacques Mieses defeated Joseph Henry Blackburne in a 32-move Scotch Game that Tarrasch annotated at some length in the tournament book.
