= Leopold Löwy Sr. =

Austrian chess player

Leopold Loewy (Löwy) Sr. (born 1840) was an Austrian chess player.

He took 7th place, while his son Leopold Löwy Jr. took 9th at Vienna 1904 (Carl Schlechter won).

He and his son elaborated and introduced the Loewy Gambit (1.e4 e5 2.f4 Bc5 3.Nf3 d6 4.b4) in the King's Gambit, Declined, Classical Variation [C 30].
