= Josef Krejcik =

Austrian chess player (1885–1957)

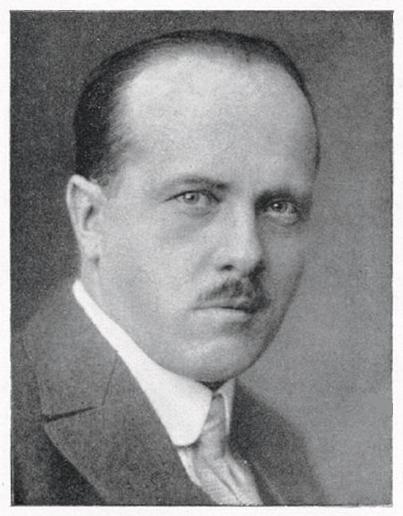
Josef Krejcik

Josef Emil Krejcik (22 January 1885, Rudolfsheim bei Wien – 4 January 1957) was an Austrian chess master, problemist, journalist and author.

Born in Vienna, he participated in many local tournaments before, during and after World War I. He took 6th in 1908 (Richard Réti won), took 5th in 1909/10 (the 2nd Trebitsch Memorial, Réti won), took 8th in 1910 (Carl Schlechter and Rudolf Spielmann won), took 6th in 1914/15 (the 6th Trebitsch Memorial, Schlechter won), tied for 2nd-3rd, behind Józef Dominik, in 1915 (Quadrangular), won ahead of Schenkein in 1915, took 8th in 1921 (Friedrich Sämisch won), shared 1st with Hans Kmoch in 1921, and tied for 10-12th in 1929/30 (the 13th Trebitsch Memorial, Kmoch and Spielmann won). In 1930, he drew a game with Pál Réthy in a friendly match Budapest vs. Vienna.

Dr. Josef Krejcik published in Vienna's leading chess magazine, the Wiener Schachzeitung, and ran a chess column in the Neues Wiener Tagblatt. He was an author of famous chess books: 13 Kinder Caissens (Vienna 1924), Artige und unartige Kinder der Schachmuse (Leipzig, 1925), and Mein Abschied vom Schach (Berlin, 1955). He was known for his humorous witty remarks.

His name is attached to the Krejcik Gambit in the Dutch Defence (1. d4 f5 2. g4).

== Notable games ==
Though not a strong positional player, Dr. Krejcik succeeded at times to defeat some of the strongest players of his time, often with miniatures.

- Josef Krejcik - Milan Vidmar, Vienna 1906 Vienna game C29 (21 moves)
- Josef Krejcik - Hugo Süchting, Wenen 1908 Sicilian defence, Morphy gambit B21 (10 moves)
- Josef Krejcik - Richard Réti, Vienna 1922 Queen's Gambit D06 (10 moves)

The following game is known as « The Immortal of Dr. Krejcik »:

- Johann Berger - Josef Krejcik, Carlsbad 1911

Albin Countergambit - 1. d4 d5 2. c4 e5 3. dxe5 d4 4. e4 Bc5 5. f4 f6 6. exf6 Nxf6 7. Bd3 Nc6
8. a3 a5 9. Nf3 0-0 10. 0-0 Re8 11. e5 Ng4 12. Re1 Bf5! (the start of a powerful attack)
13. Bxf5 d3+ 14. Kf1 Qh4!! (the first of two offers of the Queen) 15. Qd2 Qxh2!
16. Bxd3 Qh1+ 17. Ke2 Qxg2 18. Kd1 Qxf3 19. Be2 Qb3+ 20. Qc2 Nf2+ 21. Kd2 Be3 mate.
