= Wiener Schachzeitung =

- Categories: Chess
- Frequency: Monthly
- Founder: Ernst Falkbeer
- Founded: 1855
- Final issue: 1949
- Country: Austria
- Based in: Vienna

Wiener Schachzeitung (or Wiener Schach-Zeitung, "Viennese Chess Bulletin") was the name of several Austrian chess periodicals published in Vienna between 1855 and 1949.

== Original publications (1855 and 1887–1888) ==
The original publication, the first Austrian chess magazine, was founded by Ernst Falkbeer in January 1855. He envisaged it as Austria's premier chess magazine, modeling it after the prestigious Berliner Schachzeitung.

In July 1887 the Viennese player Josef Berger (not to be confused with Johann Berger) and Samuel Gold, best known as Carl Schlechter's chess teacher, established a new monthly magazine of the same name. Due to financial problems it lasted only 9 issues (January–September 1888).

== Die Wiener Schachzeitung (1898–1916) ==
In 1898 editors Hugo Fähndrich, Alexander Halprin and Georg Marco founded a new magazine of the same name. The primary editor was Marco, who also wrote most of the material. It was published monthly from 1898-1908, and twice monthly from 1909 until April 1915 (though publication was often sporadic). Originally the organ of the Vienna Chess Club, it grew to become one of the leading chess periodicals of its time. It published over 2,200 games from most of the major tournaments with detailed annotations.

Aron Nimzowitsch worked closely with the Wiener Schachzeitung; in the March 1913 issue (5-8) he published a critique of Siegbert Tarrasch titled 'Does The Modern Chess Game' by Dr. Tarrasch actually correspond to a modern view?". This essay marked the beginning of a new stage in the development of chess theory, leading to the beginning of the hypermodern school of chess. The magazine ceased publication in 1916 due to the First World War; 284 issues had been published.

== (Neue) Wiener Schachzeitung (1923–1938) ==
In March 1923 the magazine was reestablished as the "Neue Wiener Schachzeitung", but reverted to the "Wiener Schachzeitung" the following year. The driving forces were the strong amateur Robert Wahle and publisher Akim Lewit, who were also founding members of the chess section of the Jewish sports club Hakoah Vienna. This publication was considered inferior to its predecessor, but it continued to promote new chess ideas, publishing an article by Nimzowitsch entitled "Surrender of the Centre - a Prejudice" in 1923.

From 1926 until June 1935 the magazine was edited by Albert Becker, who was able to solicit contributions from leading masters and theoreticians of the day. In January 1936 a new editorial team of Erich Eliskases, Jacques Hannak and Roman Meyer took over. The magazine abruptly ceased publication in March 1938 following the annexation of Austria by the Third Reich.

== Attempted revival (1948–1949) ==
An unsuccessful attempt was made to revive the Wiener Schachzeitung after the end of World War II. It appeared in July 1948, claiming to be the "official organ of the Austrian Chess Federation", but folded in late 1949. The chief editor was Edwin Hofmann, with the problem section edited by Josef Halumbirek.
