= World Chess Championship 1910 (Lasker–Schlechter) =

	Defending champion	Challenger
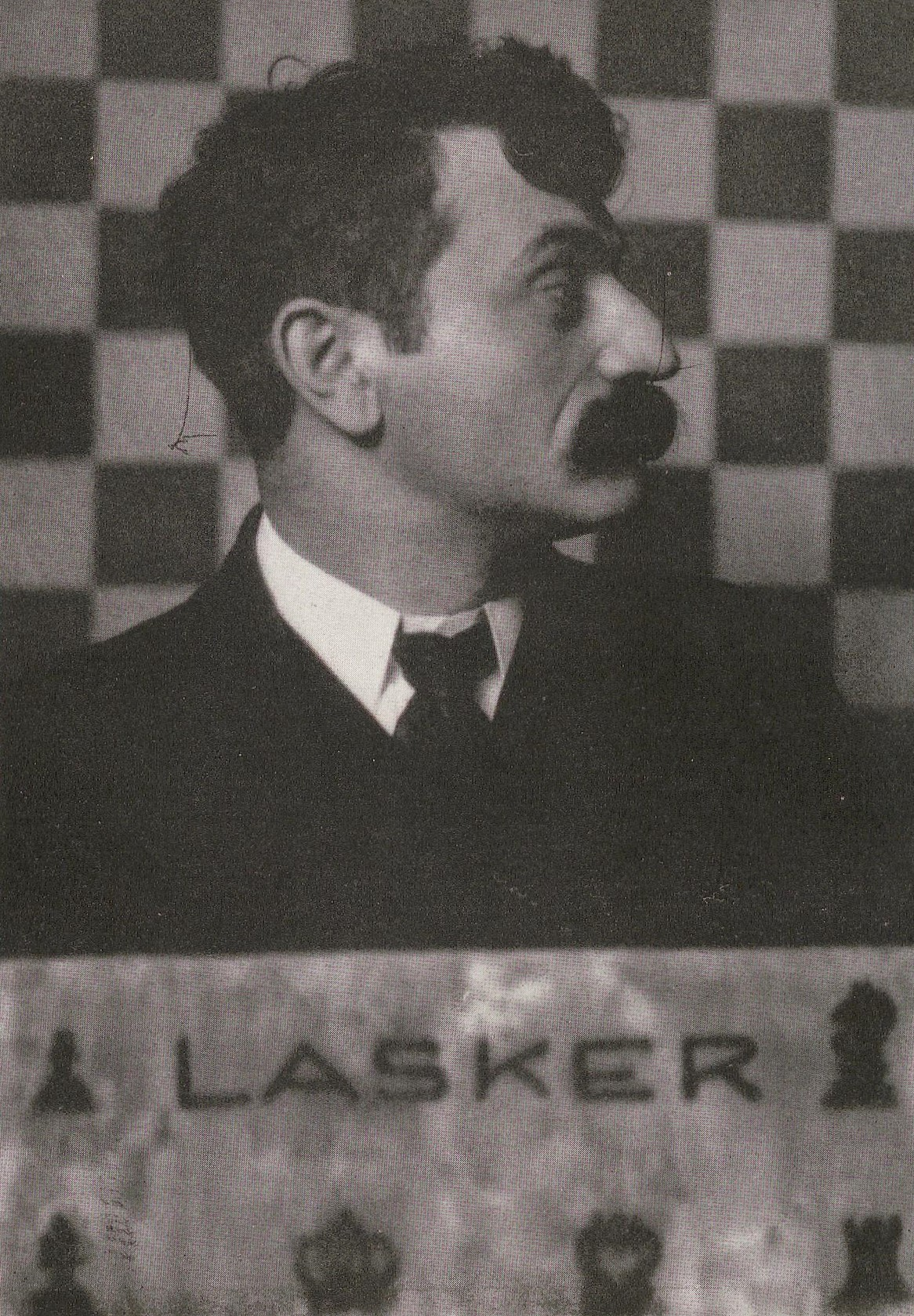
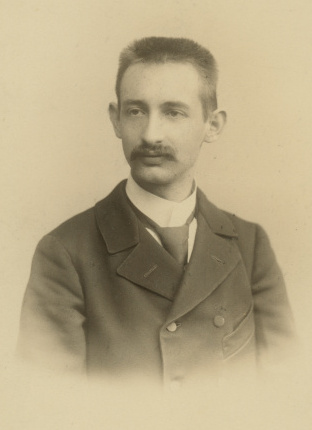
	Emanuel Lasker	Karl Schlechter
	(German Empire) Emanuel Lasker	(Austria-Hungary) Karl Schlechter
5	Scores	5
	Born 24 December 1868; 41 years old	Born 2 March 1874; 35 years old

From January 7 to February 10, 1910, Emanuel Lasker faced Carl Schlechter in a World Chess Championship played in Vienna and Berlin. The match was tied, and Lasker retained his title.

== Match conditions ==
=== Championship stakes ===
The match is generally regarded as a World Championship match, but some sources have doubted this in view of its strange outcome. R.J. Buckley reported in the American Chess Bulletin that the ten-game match was not for the World Championship, and that its result suggested that "a contest on different terms, a match for the World Championship" should be played. But at the foot of this article the editor added that Lasker had told him, "Yes, I placed the title at stake". In the Encyclopaedia of Chess, Anne Sunnucks describes the match as "a so-called championship match".

On the other hand, in his book Le guide des échecs the chess author Nicolas Giffard does not express the slightest doubt that this was a chess championship match, but points out that in case Schlechter won, he would still need to win a revenge match before being called the World Champion.

=== Possible two-point margin clause ===
Lasker drew the match by winning the final game. Many commentators have puzzled over Schlechter's play in this final game, in which he appeared to eschew the chance of a draw, and played for a win.

A common explanation is that Schlechter had to win by two points to win the world title. Israel Horowitz, Nicolas Giffard and Fred Wilson all write that a two-point margin was required.

There appears to be no direct evidence for this. However, a two-point margin for a 30-game match (as opposed to the 10-game match which was finally played) was agreed upon in 1908: "Conditions of the match with Schlechter have been agreed upon. Accordingly, it will consist of thirty games. Schlechter will win the championship of the world, if his score exceeds mine by two points at least. If the difference between the scores is only one point, the match will be a draw, and a tie match will have to be arranged."

Lasker himself wrote two days before the tenth game, in his report to the New York Evening Post, "The match with Schlechter is nearing its end and it appears probable that for the first time in my life I shall be the loser. If that should happen a good man will have won the World Championship". This implies that it really was a world title match and that there was no "two-game lead" clause.

Other explanations have been advanced for the development of the last game. A report shortly after the end of the match appears to speculate that Schlechter threw the last game because a narrow victory for him would not have been in the financial interests of either player, as they would have had to play another match if Schlechter won narrowly, but they had not been able to get adequate financial backing for the 1910 match.

Another interpretation, offered separately by Luděk Pachman and Larry Evans, is that Schlechter simply did not play the final game well enough. Pachman writes that "both players were labouring under such nervous stress that their power of judgment was not working as well as it normally did." Evans writes, "The truth is Schlechter probably never saw a clear draw! He missed 35...Rd8! with good winning chances. Later he said he intended 38...Qh4 39.Kg2 Qg4 40.Rg3 Qxc8 overlooking 41.Qg6! Flustered, he then missed a draw—and the title—by 39...Qh4! 40.Kd2 Qh2 41.Ke3 Rxf3 42.Kxf3 Qh3 43.Ke2 Qxc8 44.Qxb5, etc. The last hope to hold was 46...Qa2."

Another suggestion is that Schlechter played to win the last game because he was too honourable to get the title by a fluke, having won the fifth game when Lasker blundered in a better position.

== Results ==
The match was best of 10 games. The match was drawn, so Lasker retained the world title.

World Chess Championship Match 1910
	1	2	3	4	5	6	7	8	9	10	Points
Carl Schlechter (Austria-Hungary)	½	½	½	½	1	½	½	½	½	0	5
Emanuel Lasker (Germany)	½	½	½	½	0	½	½	½	½	1	5

== Popular culture ==
A fictionalised account of the match is presented in the 1998 novel Carl Haffner's Love of the Draw by Thomas Glavinic.
