= Nightwork =

Nightwork is shift work which is carried out at night.

Nightwork or Night Work may also refer to:

- Night Work (1930 film), an American comedy film
- Night Work (1939 film), a comedy film
- Night Work (King novel), fourth book in the Kate Martinelli series by Laurie R. King, published in 2000
- Night Work (Glavinic novel), a 2006 novel by Austrian writer Thomas Glavinic
- Nightwork: Sexuality, Pleasure, and Corporate Masculinity in a Tokyo Hostess Club, a 1994 book-length study in the field of cultural anthropology of contemporary Japan by Anne Allison
- Nightwork: A History of Hacks and Pranks at MIT, a 2003 book
- Nightwork (album), a 1998 album by the one-man black metal band Diabolical Masquerade
- Night Work (album), a 2010 studio album by American band Scissor Sisters, or the title track
- Nightwork, a bonus album released with the deluxe edition of Devin Townsend's 2022 album Lightwork

== See also ==
- Niteworks, a Celtic fusion band
