= Adolf Zinkl =

Czech/Austrian chess player

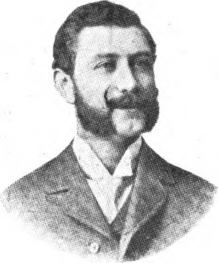

Personal information
- Born: Adolf Julius Zinkl; 10 June 1871 Neuhaus, Bohemia
- Died: 3 June 1944 (aged 72) Vienna, Austria

Chess career
- Country: Austria

Adolf Julius Zinkl (10 June 1871 – 3 June 1944) was an Austrian chess master.

== Tournament results ==
Born in Bohemia, he settled in Vienna, where he played in many tournaments in the 1890s. He took 4th in 1892/93, shared 2nd (Quadrangular) in 1893, took 5th in 1893/94 (Jacques Schwarz won), drew a match with Carl Schlechter (5½ : 5½) and lost to Georg Marco (2½ : 5½), both in 1894, took 5th in 1895 (Marco won), took 8th in 1895/96 (Schlechter and Max Weiss won), tied for 4–5th in 1896 and took 6th in 1897/98, both won by Marco. He won in 1899, and tied for 5–7th in 1899/1900 (Kolisch memorial, Géza Maróczy won).

Zinkl also took 14th at Leipzig 1894 (the 9th DSB Congress, Siegbert Tarrasch won), and tied for 17–18th at Berlin 1897 (Rudolf Charousek won).
