= Arthur Kaufmann =

Romanian-Austrian attorney (1872–1938)

Arthur Kaufmann (4 April 1872 in Iași, Romania – 25 July 1938 in Vienna) was an Austrian attorney, philosopher and chess master.

== Life ==
Kaufmann was the second son of a wealthy, Jewish merchant family in Iaşi, Romania. In early childhood, he moved with his mother and siblings to Vienna, where he eventually attended university. He studied law and attended lectures on the history of literature and philosophy. He earned his doctorate in 1896. For a short period he worked as a legal apprentice, but his family's prosperous circumstance soon afforded him the means to live independently from his inheritance.

Kaufmann considered himself primarily a philosopher. He worked for decades on a comprehensive philosophical opus, embracing Immanuel Kant and Johann Wolfgang von Goethe’s ideas in particular, but never completed it. His only publication was a piece on Albert Einstein's Theory of relativity. A philosophical fairy tale is, as his whole bequest, lost.

Kaufmann regularly attended the Vienna Chess Club and ultimately became an internationally recognized player. In 1892, he tied for 5-6th (Adolf Albin won), shared 3rd in 1893/94 (Jacques Schwarz won), twice took 2nd in 1896 and 1897/98, both behind Georg Marco. He drew a match with Marco (+5 -5 =0) in 1893. In 1914/15, he took 2nd, behind Carl Schlechter, in Vienna (Trebitsch Memorial). He took 3rd at Vienna 1915 (Quadrangular, Schlechter won), and 3rd place, behind Schlechter and Milan Vidmar, at Vienna 1916 (Triangular). He won matches against Richard Réti (+4 -1 =1) in 1915, and Savielly Tartakower (+2 -0 =2) in 1916. In January 1917, with his best, historic ELO-stat of 2637, he was the eighth-best in the worldwide chess ranking (established thereafter). Due to unknown reasons, he ended his career as a chess player in 1917.

Kaufmann was a close friend of the Austrian author, Arthur Schnitzler, who mentioned his encounters with Kaufmann in his diary several times, expressing his appreciation of Kaufmann's personality and character. In his last will, Schnitzler appointed Kaufmann, in addition to the Austrian author, Richard Beer-Hofmann, as advisor to his son, Heinrich, in all issues regarding his literary legacy. Schnitzler's literary estate, with its notes and letters, comprises the main source of information on Kaufmann's life and ideas.

Impoverished, due to World War I, Kaufmann and his younger sister, Malwine, moved from Vienna to Mariazell in 1918, and then to Altaussee in 1920, because life in the countryside was less expensive. Beginning in 1923, Kaufmann spent the next ten or so years as a guest of the Viennese industrialist, Wilhelm von Gutmann, in the castle of Würting, near Lambach, in Upper-Austria, before returning to Vienna. (For a number of years, Richard von Coudenhove-Kalergi, the founder of the Paneuropean Union, also enjoyed the hospitality of the Gutmann-family at the castle of Würting.) According to the official announcement, Kaufmann died on the July 25, 1938, of “sudden cardiac death and arteriosclerosis”, but various indicators point to suicide. He was buried in the Jewish section of the Viennese Central Cemetery, where bombing in WW II devastated his grave. In his last will and testament, he appointed as his heirs, his nieces, Alice Kaufmann and Sophie Kaufmann (daughters of his brother, Ludwig Kaufmann), who at that time, and following WW II, lived in Paris, at rue Molitor 56. All attempts to find Kaufmann's written bequest, as well as photographs of him, have been unsuccessful so far.

== Publications ==
Arthur Kaufmann: Zur Relativitätstheorie. Erkenntnistheoretische Erörterungen. In: Der neue Merkur 3, 1919/20, p. 587-594.
