= Brassey Institute =

Arts and science institute in Hastings, England

Coordinates: 50°51′19″N 0°34′35″E

The Brassey Institute at 13 Claremont in Hastings, England, was founded by Thomas Brassey in 1879 and, as the Brassey School of Science and Art, provided for the study of arts and the sciences. It opened a chemistry laboratory in the Old Town of Hastings around 1900. The building has housed the town's library for decades. Stocking 11,000 volumes as of 1933, the Institute also housed a museum devoted to natural history, archaeology and local art.

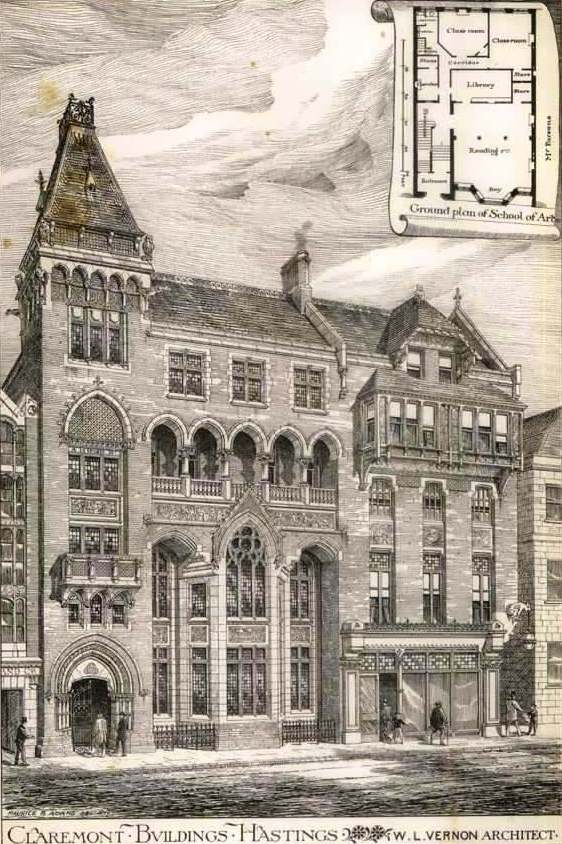

A building in the Venetian Gothic style, it served as the location of the Hastings 1895 chess tournament. 22 Masters were invited to the competition, one of which was William H. K. Pollock, representing Canada.

During Lady Brassey's lifetime, Working men's clubs often met at the location.

It is a Grade II listed building.

== See also ==
- Grade II* listed buildings in Hastings
