= Carl Haffner's Love of the Draw =

1998 novel by Thomas Glavinic

Carl Haffner’s Love of the Draw
- UK paperback edition
- Author: Thomas Glavinic
- Original title: Carl Haffners Liebe zum Unentschieden
- Translator: John Brownjohn
- Cover artist: Mark Pennington
- Language: German
- Genre: Literary fiction
- Publisher: Volk und Welt (Germany); Harvill Press (UK)
- Publication date: 1998
- Publication place: Austria
- English publication date: 1999
- Media type: Print (hardcover and paperback)
- Pages: 228 (Germany); 248 (UK)
- ISBN: 978-1-86046-676-2
- OCLC: 442553734
- Followed by: Herr Susi

Carl Haffner's Love of the Draw (German: Carl Haffners Liebe zum Unentschieden) is a 1998 chess novel by Austrian writer Thomas Glavinic. It was Glavinic's first novel and is about a shy and withdrawn Viennese chess master who in 1910 challenges the World Champion for his title. The book was translated into English in 1999 by John Brownjohn for London-based publisher Harvill Press.

== Plot summary ==
The novel is set mainly in Vienna in 1910. It presents a fictionalised account of a famous 1910 World Chess Championship match between Austrian grandmaster Carl Schlechter and the reigning German champion Emanuel Lasker. The eponymous Carl Haffner, closely based on Schlechter, is a withdrawn character with an eccentric preference for drawing games instead of winning. The narrative switches between the ten games of the 1910 World Championship and Haffner's psychological development in childhood and adolescence, showing how he used chess to overcome poverty.

== Critical reception ==
The UK edition received a range of positive reviews in the mainstream UK press. The Guardian called it "strikingly good" and said that it was "one of chess's finest novels, sitting comfortably alongside Nabokov's The Luzhin Defense and Paolo Maurensig's The Lüneburg Variation". The Times Literary Supplement said: "Glavinic's novel achieves its considerable emotional impact slowly and subtly ... [he] writes about a game as if it were a poem or a painting". The Scotsman claimed that the book was "a brisk and powerful portrait of a chess prodigy" presented with "a combination of lyricism, philosophy and edginess".

The novel made the 1999 Daily Telegraph book of the year list and was nominated for the 2001 International Dublin Literary Award.
