= Beniamino Vergani =

Italian chess player

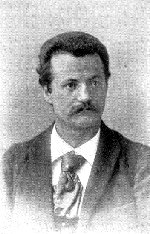
Beniamino Vergani

Beniamino Vergani (Montebelluna, 2 June 1863 – 15 July 1927) was an Italian chess master.

A businessman who learned the game in 1884, he soon distinguished himself in local tournaments. He took part in the Italian National Tournament at Turin 1892, coming second behind Torre. Vergani finished 22nd and last at the Hastings 1895 tournament with 3/21.

In 1900, Vergani came 2nd-3rd in Rome scoring 10/14, and in 1901 he was fifth in Venice with 5.5/14. He attempted problem composition, and wrote the chess column of Illustrated Sport of Milan from 1890 to 1897, the year in which it ceased publication.

The chess club Beniamino Vergani, in Montebelluna, is dedicated to his memory. One of the strongest Italian youth chess movements today is built around this club.
