= Thomas Glavinic =

Austrian writer (born 1972)

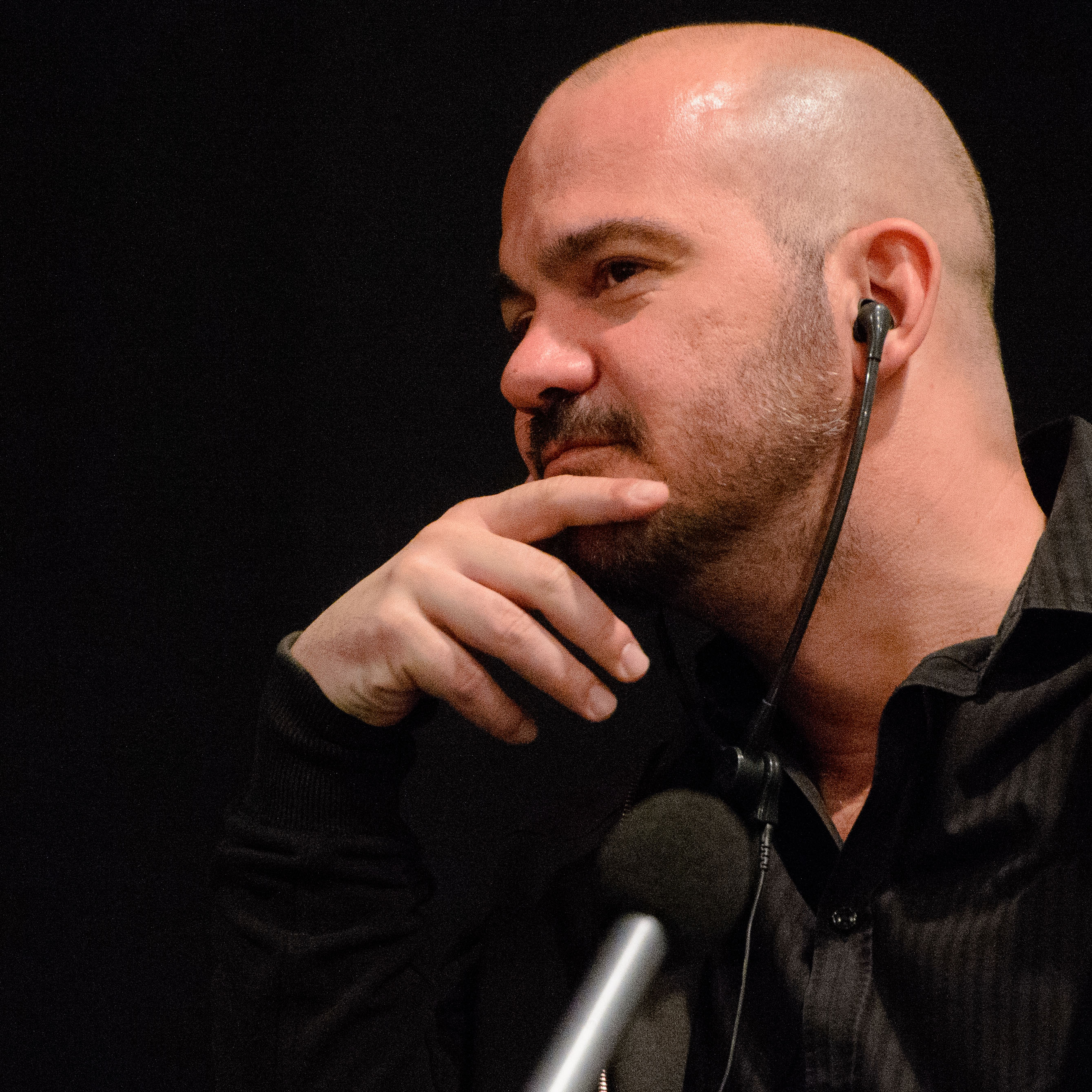
Glavinic in 2014

Thomas Glavinic (born 2 April 1972 in Graz) is an Austrian writer. With Kathrin Röggla and Daniel Kehlmann, he is among other contemporary Austrian authors being perceived as significantly shaping the literary discussion in Austria.

== Life ==
The former writer of advertising copy and taxi driver emerged with his 1998 debut novel Carl Haffner's Love of the Draw. The novel describes the life of chess master Carl Schlechter. The book received several awards and has been translated into other languages, but did not make it onto the bestseller lists. The novel has autobiographical aspects: Thomas Glavinic played his first chess game at the age of five and in 1987 he achieved second place in the Austrian chess rankings for his age group.

The novel Herr Susi (Mr. Susi) followed in 2000. Written in hard prose, it is a statement against the football business, and received mainly negative reviews from the critics. In 2001, the criminal novel Der Kameramörder (The Camera Murderer) (awarded the Friedrich-Glauser-Prize at the Criminale) was published and was enthusiastically celebrated by the feuilletons due to its criticism of the media. In 2004, Glavinic succeeded in convincing both critics (no. 1 on the ORF critics best list) and readers (no. 1 on the Austrian bestseller list) with his satiric development-novel Wie man leben soll (How to Live), written from the perspective of the indefinite "one". In August 2006, the novel Die Arbeit der Nacht (Night Work) was released and scored no. 1 on the critic's list again in the same month. His novel, Das bin doch ich (That's Me), appeared in summer of 2007 and was nominated for the German Book Prize. It made it onto the short list, a selection of six of the twenty authors originally chosen.

Thomas Glavinic lives in Vienna.

== Bibliography ==
- Carl Haffners Liebe zum Unentschieden. Novel. Volk und Welt, Berlin 1998. ISBN 3-353-01111-0
- Herr Susi. Novel. Volk und Welt, Berlin 2000. ISBN 3-353-01152-8
- Der Kameramörder. Novel. Volk und Welt, Berlin 2001. ISBN 3-353-01191-9
- Wie man leben soll. Novel. dtv, Munich 2004. ISBN 3-423-24392-9
- Die Arbeit der Nacht. Novel. Hanser, Munich 2006. ISBN 3-446-20762-7
- Das bin doch ich. Novel. Hanser, Munich 2007. ISBN 978-3-446-20912-1
- Das Leben der Wünsche. Hanser, Munich 2009. ISBN 978-3-446-23390-4
- Lisa. Hanser, Munich 2011. ISBN 978-3-446-23636-3
- Das größere Wunder: Roman. Hanser, Munich 2013. ISBN 978-3446243323

Glavinic's novels have been translated into English, French, Dutch, Italian, Finnish and Estonian.

=== English editions ===
- Carl Haffner's Love of the Draw (Carl Haffners Liebe zum Unentschieden), translated by John Brownjohn. Harvill, 1999. ISBN 1-86046-676-1
- Night Work (Die Arbeit der Nacht), translated by John Brownjohn. Canongate, Edinburgh, 2008. ISBN 978-1-84767-184-4
- Pull Yourself Together (Wie man leben soll), translated by John Brownjohn. AmazonCrossing, Las Vegas, 2012. ISBN 978-1-61218-432-6

=== French editions ===
- Partie remise. Pauvert, Paris 2001. ISBN 2-7202-1399-3

=== Dutch editions ===
- Carl Haffners liefde voor remise. Atlas, Amsterdam 2000. ISBN 90-450-0294-9
- Nachtwerk. Contact, Amsterdam 2007. ISBN 978-90-254-0443-7

=== Italian editions ===
- La sfida di Carl Haffner. Beit, Trieste 2009. ISBN 978-88-95324-05-0

=== Finnish editions ===
- Toiveet jotka toteutuvat. Atena, Jyväskylä 2010. ISBN 978-951-796-648-1

=== Estonian editions ===
- Öötöö. Varrak, Tallinn 2011. ISBN 978-998-532-315-1

== Interviews ==
- Wir dürfen lügen, das ist schön. in: BELLA triste No. 18, Hildesheim 2007.

== Prizes, awards, and scholarships ==
- 1995 Vienna Author's Scholarship
- 2001 Project Scholarship of the Austrian Federal Chancellery
- 2002 Elias-Canetti-Scholarship of the city of Vienna
- 2002 Austrian Federal Scholarship for Literature
- 2002 Friedrich-Glauser-Preis for Der Kameramörder
- 2006 Great Austrian Federal Prize for Literature
- 2007 Finalist for the German Book Prize, with Das bin doch ich

== See also ==
- List of Austrian writers
