= Jacques Schwarz =

Austrian chess player (1856–1921)

Jacques Schwarz (January 1856 – 13 June 1921) was an Austrian chess master.

Born in Moravia, he tied for 5–6th at Graz 1880 (Adolf Schwarz, Johannes Minckwitz and Max Weiss won). In 1881, he tied for 7–8th in Berlin (2nd DSB-Kongress, Joseph Henry Blackburne won). In 1883, he took 9th in Nuremberg (3rd DSB-Kongress, Szymon Winawer won). In 1889, he took 3rd in Dessau. In 1890, he tied for 6–7th in Vienna (Kolisch Memorial, Weiss won). In 1893/94, he won ahead of Georg Marco in Vienna. In 1895/96, he took 5th in Vienna (Carl Schlechter and Weiss won).

Schwarz died in Vienna at age 65.
