= Samuel Gold =

Hungarian physician and journalist

Samuel Gold (July 2, 1835 – November 9, 1920) was a Hungarian physician, journalist and composer of chess problems.

== Biography ==
He was born into a Jewish family in Kővágóörs, a town located on the shores of Lake Balaton. He learned playing chess at the age of 15 during his years spent in a high school. In 1857, he departed to Vienna for take the courses of a medical school.

Gold published his first chess compositions in the Budapest Vasárnapi Ujság and the Wiener Illustrirte Zeitung in 1857. He became a chess editor for the Der Osten in 1864, and later for other newspapers, among which the Allgemeine Sport-Zeitung. In 1883, he published his collection of 200 Schachaufgaben (Vienna, 1883).

Since 1887, he was the first and only chess teacher to Carl Schlechter in Vienna.

He arrived in America on December 11, 1892, and immediately published two chess problems in the New York Sun. Gold remained in New York for the rest of his life. He died in Bronx at the age of 85, and was buried (funeral from the chapel of Saul Rothschild, 159 West 120th St.) in the presence of a small group of Hungarian relatives and friends in the evening of November 11, 1920.
