= Night Work (Glavinic novel) =

2006 novel by Thomas Glavinic

- UK paperback edition
- Author: Thomas Glavinic
- Original title: Die Arbeit der Nacht
- Translator: John Brownjohn
- Language: German
- Genre: Literary fiction
- Publisher: Hanser (Germany); Canongate (UK)
- Publication date: 2006
- Publication place: Austria
- English publication date: 2008
- Media type: Print (hardcover and paperback)
- Pages: 400 (Germany); 386 (UK)
- ISBN: 978-1-84767-051-9
- OCLC: 442553734
- Preceded by: Wie man leben soll
- Followed by: Das bin doch ich

Night Work (German: Die Arbeit der Nacht) is a 2006 novel by Austrian writer Thomas Glavinic. The book was translated into English in 2008 by John Brownjohn for Edinburgh-based publisher Canongate.

== Plot summary ==
The novel, set in modern-day Vienna, is a post-apocalyptic exploration around themes of solitude and existential philosophy.

The plot concerns a central character, Jonas, who wakes up one day to discover that everyone else has vanished from the city, perhaps the world, without trace; he appears to be the only person left.

As he attempts to discover what could possibly explain such a situation, the days pass and he begins to realise that he is performing strange activities when asleep. A struggle ensues as Jonas tries to control his unconscious actions while he continues to search in vain for other human life.

== Critical reception ==
The UK edition received a generally positive reception from critics. The Guardian referred to the book as being “at times genuinely horrific” because of the author’s skill in manipulating the “reader's constant anxiety that [he] won't, indeed can't, deliver a solution to his own mystery”. The Independent claimed that the novel, “functions both as an outstanding fictionalisation of Freud's essay The Uncanny, and as a superior literary thriller packed with invention and suspense”. The Scotland on Sunday said it was “strong on intrigue” and “seriously frightening”.
