= Adolf Albin =

Romanian chess player (1848–1920)

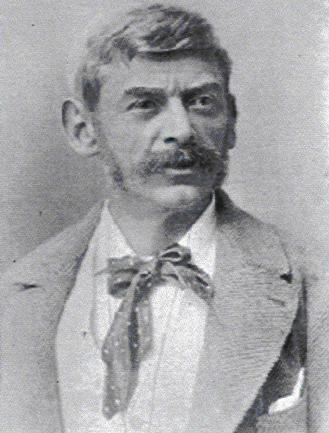

Personal information
- Born: 14 September 1848 Bucharest, Principality of Wallachia
- Died: 22 March 1920 (aged 71) Vienna

Chess career
- Country: Romania

Adolf Albin (14 September 1848 – 22 March 1920) was a Romanian chess player. He is best known for the countergambit that bears his name and for authoring the first chess book written in Romanian.

== Life ==
He was born in Bucharest, Romania, to a wealthy family. His forefathers, however, sprang from Hamburg, Germany, and settled in Zhitomir, Ukraine, in the 19th century, but later moved to Romania. After completing his studies in Vienna, he went back to Romania, where he ran the Frothier Printing House in Bucharest. Soon he became associated with Dr. Bethel Henry Baron von Stroussberg, working as a translator for the influential railroad tycoon who was nicknamed "The King of Railways". Stroussberg's financial bankruptcy in 1875 led to Albin's exile in Vienna once again, together with his wife and three children. He died at age 71 in a Vienna sanatorium.

== Chess career ==
Albin came to chess relatively late: according to The Oxford Companion to Chess, he learnt the game in his 20s and did not play in international events until his 40s. His best result came in New York in 1893, where he finished second behind Emanuel Lasker (who scored a perfect 13/13), ahead of Jackson Showalter, Harry Nelson Pillsbury and others. He played in the very strong tournaments in Hastings in 1895 (scoring 8½/21) and Nuremberg in 1896 (scoring 7/18). His tournament results on the whole were spotty, though he won individual games against several notable players, including world champion Wilhelm Steinitz in New York in 1894 and Nuremberg in 1896. He authored the first chess book in Romanian, Amiculŭ Joculu de Scachu Teoreticu şi Practicu (published in Bucharest in 1872).

== Death ==
Albin died on 22 March 1920 in the Rothschild-Spital in Vienna. He is buried in the Jewish section of the Zentralfriedhof.

== Legacy ==
Albin is the eponym of several chess opening variations, notably the Albin Countergambit in the Queen's Gambit (1.d4 d5 2.c4 e5) and the Albin Attack (also known as the Alekhine–Chatard Attack) in the French Defence (1.e4 e6 2.d4 d5 3.Nc3 Nf6 4.Bg5 Be7 5.e5 Nfd7 6.h4).
