= Georg Marco =

Austrian chess player (1863–1923)

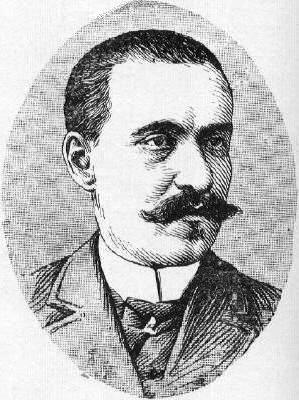
Georg Marco.

Georg Marco (29 November 1863 – 29 August 1923) was an Austrian chess player.

He was born in Chernivtsi (Cernăuţi), Bukovina (then part of the Austrian Empire). He later settled in Vienna and was secretary of the Vienna Chess Club.

In tournaments he was 6th at Graz 1890, 6th= at Vienna 1890, 1st at Vienna 1891, 4th= at Dresden 1892, 1st at Vienna 1892, 2nd at Vienna 1893, 6th= at Leipzig 1894, 2nd= at Pressburg 1894, 1st at Vienna 1895, 17th= at Hastings 1895, 13th at Nuremberg 1896, 11th at Budapest 1896, 6th= at Berlin 1897, 3rd at Vienna 1897, 2nd= at London 1899/1900, 7th= at Paris 1900, 5th= at Munich 1900, 9th at Monte Carlo 1901, 15th at Monte Carlo 1902, 6th at Monte Carlo 1903, 3rd at the Vienna Gambit tournament 1903, 4th at Cambridge Springs 1904, 4th= at Coburg 1904, 5th= at Ostend 1905, 6th at Ostend 1906, 9th at Ostend 1907, 2nd= at Moscow 1907, 3rd at Stockholm 1912, 4th= at Budapest 1913, 4th at Vienna 1915, 9th= at Gothenburg 1920, 7th at The Hague 1921, and 18th at Pistyan 1922.

In match play he drew with Carl Schlechter twice; (+0 –0 =10) in 1893 and (+4 –4 =3) in 1894. He also drew with Arthur Kaufmann (+5 –5 =0) in 1893, lost to Max Weiss (+1 –5 =1) in 1895 and beat Adolf Albin (+4 –2 =4) in 1901.

However, he is probably best known for his work as editor of the Wiener Schachzeitung from 1898 to 1916 and his annotations in the books Vienna Gambit Tournament (1903), Barmen 1905, Ostend 1906, Carlsbad 1907, Lasker-Tarrasch match for the World Chess Champion title in 1908, Baden on Vienna Gambit Tournament 1914, and Meister des Problems (Vienna 1924).

A very large man, he was jokingly referred to as "the strongest chess player in the world".
