= Carl Schlechter =

Austro-Hungarian chess player (1874–1918)

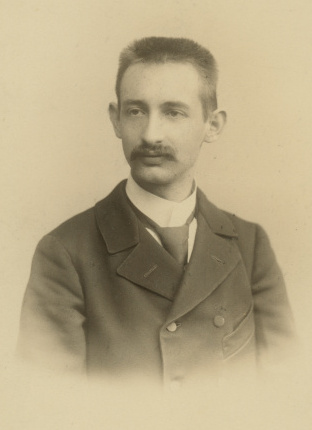
- Schlechter in 1895

Personal information
- Born: 2 March 1874 Vienna, Austria-Hungary
- Died: 27 December 1918 (aged 44) Budapest, Hungary

Chess career
- Country: Austria-Hungary

Carl Schlechter (2 March 1874 – 27 December 1918) was a leading Austro-Hungarian chess master and theoretician at the turn of the 20th century. He is best known for drawing a controversial World Chess Championship match with Emanuel Lasker.

== Early life ==
Schlechter was born into a Catholic family in Vienna. He is sometimes deemed to be Jewish, although others dispute this. He began playing chess at the age of 13. His first and only teacher was an Austria-Hungarian chess problemist, Samuel Gold.

From 1893 onwards, he played in over 50 international chess tournaments. He won or shared first at Munich 1900 (the 12th DSB Congress), Coburg 1904 (the 14th DSB Congress), Ostend 1906, Stockholm 1906, Vienna 1908, Prague 1908, Hamburg 1910 (the 17th DSB Congress), and the Trebitsch Memorial in Vienna (1911, 1912, 1913).

Schlechter played several matches. He drew with Georg Marco (+0−0=10) in 1893, drew with Marco and Adolf Zinkl both (+4−4=3) in 1894, drew with Dawid Janowski (+2−2=3) in 1896, drew with Simon Alapin (+1−1=4) in 1899, beat Janowski (+6−1=3) in 1902, drew with Richard Teichmann (+1−1=1) in 1904, and drew with Siegbert Tarrasch (+3−3=10) in 1911.

== Lasker–Schlechter match ==
In 1910, Schlechter played a match against Emanuel Lasker in the World Chess Championship 1910. Schlechter was leading by one point going into the tenth and final game. However, in that dramatic three-day contest, he blundered from a winning into a clearly drawn position, only to blunder again into a loss. The match ended in a 5–5 tie (+1 −1 =8) and Lasker retained the title. It is disputed whether Schlechter needed to score +2 to win the match and thus had to win the tenth game. No contract for the match has ever been located. Schlechter nevertheless distinguished himself as the first player to seriously challenge Lasker's hold of the world title.

== Schlechter–Mieses blindfold match ==
In September 1909 Schlechter played a three-game blindfold match against Jacques Mieses in Stuttgart, with both players playing without sight of the board; Mieses won +2 =1.

== Later life ==
Schlechter struggled to make ends meet as a chess professional during the worsening socio-economic conditions of World War I. He won the Trebitsch Memorial in Vienna three times. In 1918, he took third in Vienna, lost a match to Akiba Rubinstein (+1−2=3), placed second in Berlin (Quadrangular, Milan Vidmar won), tied for third place in Kaschau, and took third place in Berlin (Quadrangular, Emanuel Lasker won).

Schlechter died of pneumonia and starvation on 27 December 1918, and was buried in Budapest on 31 December 1918.

== Assessment ==
The Carl Schlechter–Arthur Kaufmann–Hugo Fähndrich trio propagated the Viennese chess school, founded by Max Weiss in the 19th century. Schlechter, whose knowledge of the positional chess theories of Wilhelm Steinitz was profound, was known especially for his expertise in the Ruy Lopez.

A fine problem solver and composer, Schlechter was also a chess journalist and editor. He prepared the eighth and final edition of the monumental Handbuch des Schachspiels openings treatise. Published in eleven parts between 1912 and 1916, the Handbuch totaled 1,040 pages and included contributions by Rudolf Spielmann, Siegbert Tarrasch, and Richard Teichmann. William Hartston described it as "a superb work, perhaps the last to encase successfully the whole of chess knowledge within a single volume."

Schlechter would commonly offer courteous draws to opponents who felt unwell. If his opponent arrived late for a game, he would inconspicuously subtract an equal amount of time from his own clock. He also mentored many of his rivals, including Oldřich Duras.

The Carl Schlechter Memorial Tournament is named after him.

== Opening variations named after Schlechter ==
His contributions to chess opening theory include:

- Schlechter Gambit, Bird's Opening: 1.f4 e5 2.fxe5 Nc6
- Schlechter Variation, French Defence: 1.e4 e6 2.d4 d5 3.Bd3
- Schlechter Variation, Slav Defence: 1.d4 d5 2.c4 c6 3.Nf3 Nf6 4.e3 g6 (or via a Grünfeld move order, 1.d4 Nf6 2.c4 g6 3.Nc3 d5 4.e3 c6)
- Schlechter Variation, Danish Gambit: 1.e4 e5 2.d4 exd4 3.c3 dxc3 4.Bc4 cxb2 5.Bxb2 d5

== Notable games ==
- Fried vs. Schlechter, Vienna 1894, From's Gambit (A02), 0–1 A 14-move win by Schlechter, who sacrifices his queen and mates his opponent's king in the middle of the board.
- Bernhard Fleissig vs. Schlechter, Vienna 1893 (friendly), Polish Opening: General (A00), 0–1 One of Schlechter's most famous games, Black sacrifices both his rooks and bishops.
- Schlechter vs. Steinitz, Cologne 1898, Vienna Game (C28), 1–0 Schlechter routs the former World Champion in 24 moves.
- Schlechter vs. Meitner, Vienna 1899, Italian Game: Classical Variation. Greco Gambit Moeller–Therkatz Attack (C54), 1–0 A combination in the endgame: White sacrifices his queen then makes a quiet move with his king, and Black is unable to prevent a mate in two moves.

== Popular culture ==
The central character of Thomas Glavinic's 1998 novel, Carl Haffner's Love of the Draw, is closely based on Schlechter. The book presents a fictionalized account of the 1910 World Chess Championship match with Lasker.
