= List of mini chess tournaments =

This article lists some of the famous small chess tournaments in history.

== Introduction ==
The list comprises only regular tournaments with three or four players (Triangular or Quadrangular).

The first international tournament with four players (two Spanish and two Italian) was held, at the invitation of King Philip II of Spain, at the Royal Court of Spain in Madrid in 1575.

== Tournaments ==
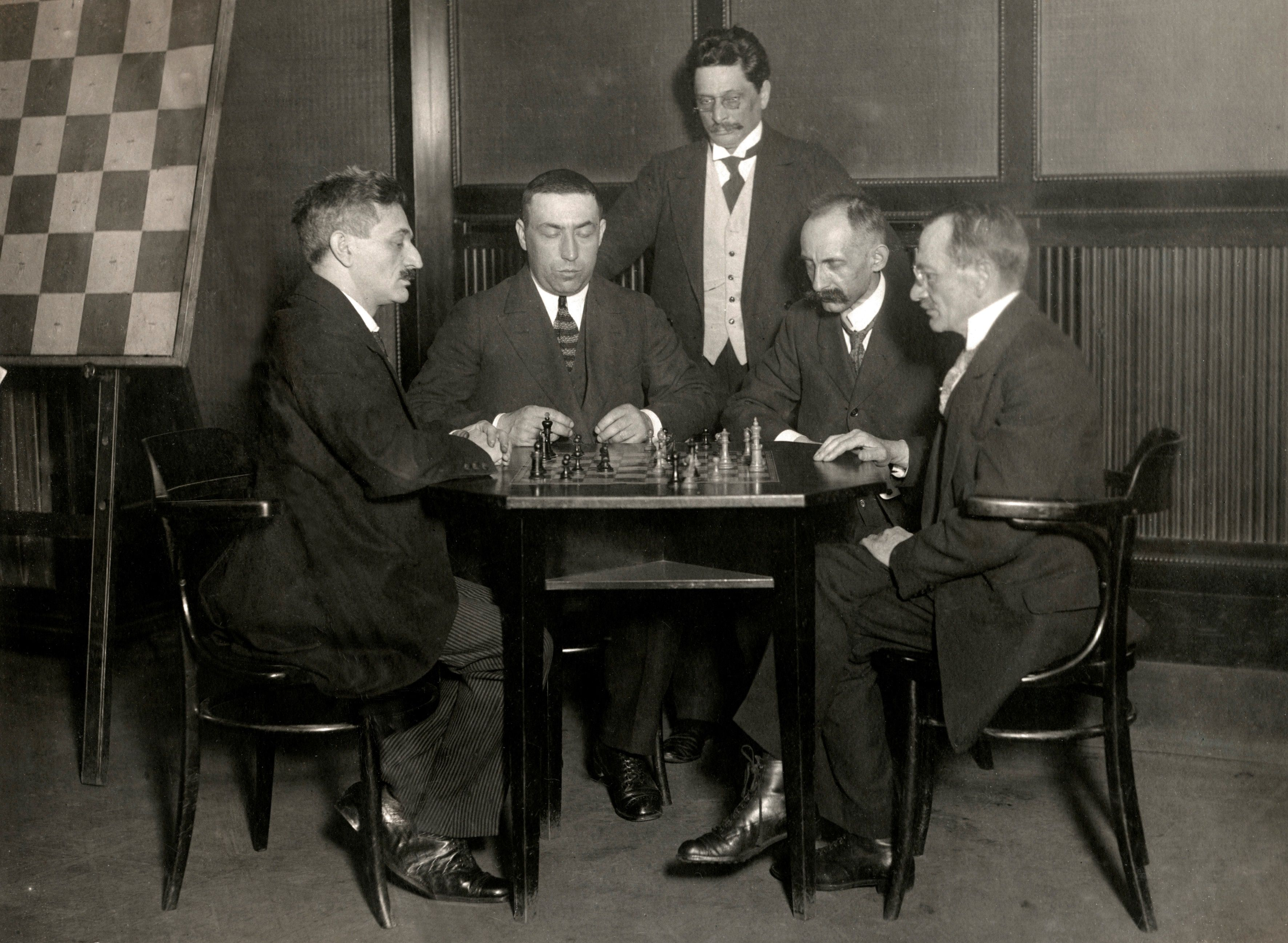
Großmeister-Turnier held in the Kerkau-Palast, Berlin, from September 28 to October 11, 1918.

- 1575 Madrid 1. Giovanni Leonardo da Cutri, 2. Paolo Boi, 3. Ruy López de Segura, 4. Alfonso Ceron
- 1821 Saint Cloud (Triangular) 1. Louis-Charles Mahé de La Bourdonnais, 2. Alexandre Deschapelles, 3. John Cochrane
- 1855 London (Triangular) 1. Ernst Falkbeer, 2. Adolf Zytogorski, 3. Brien
- 1865 Elberfeld 1. Gustav Neumann 2. Viktor Knorre 3. Hoeing 4. Pinedo
- 1867 Cologne 1–2. Wilfried Paulsen, Conrad Vitzthum von Eckstaedt, 3–4. Ehrmann, Emil Schallopp
- 1871 Krefeld (Triangular) 1. Louis Paulsen, 2. Adolf Anderssen, 3. Johannes Minckwitz
- 1871 Wiesbaden 1. Carl Göring, 2. Adolf Stern, 3. Johannes Minckwitz, 4. Hermann von Hanneken
- 1876 Düsseldorf 1. Wilfried Paulsen, 2–3. Ernst Flechsig, Constantin Schwede, 4. Asbeck
- 1879 London 1. Henry Edward Bird 2–3. Joseph Henry Blackburne, James Mason, 4. George Alcock MacDonnell
- 1883 Berlin 1. Hermann von Gottschall, 2. Emil Schallopp, 3. Max Harmonist, 4. Berthold Lasker
- 1889 Berlin 1. Emil Schallopp, 2. Theodor von Scheve, 3. Horatio Caro, 4. Hülsen
- 1892 Belfast 1–2. Joseph Henry Blackburne, James Mason, 3. Henry Bird, 4. Francis Joseph Lee
- 1894 Buffalo 1. Jackson Showalter, 2. Harry Pillsbury, 3. Adolf Albin, 4. Farnsworth
- 1895 Skaneateles 1. Eugene Delmar, 2. Richardson, 3. Albert Hodges, 4. Luce
- 1895 Hastings 1. Géza Maróczy 2–3. Henry Ernest Atkins, Rudolf Loman, 4. Wilhelm Cohn
- 1895/96 St. Petersburg 1. Emanuel Lasker, 2. Wilhelm Steinitz, 3. Harry Pillsbury, 4. Mikhail Chigorin
- 1896 Vienna 1. Berthold Englisch, 2. Carl Schlechter, 3. Georg Marco, 4. Max Weiss
- 1897 New York (Triangular) 1–2. Wilhelm Steinitz, Samuel Lipschütz, 3. William Ewart Napier
- 1897 Altona 1. Johannes Metger, 2. Hugo Süchting, 3–4. Martin Bier, Julius Dimer
- 1898 Budapest 1. Rudolf Charousek, 2. Géza Maróczy, 3. Győző Exner, 4. Arthur Havasi
- 1898 Elmshorn 1–4. Hugo Süchting, Martin Bier, Julius Dimer, Arved Heinrichsen
- 1899 Budapest (Triangular) 1. Géza Maróczy, 2. Győző Exner, 3. Miklós Bródy
- 1900 Munich 1–2. Carl Göring, Abraham Speijer, 3–4. Julius Dimer, Dirk Bleijkmans
- 1900 Kiel 1–2. Hugo Süchting, Oskar Antze 3. Johannes Metger, 4. Hermes
- 1901 Kiel 1–2. Hugo Süchting, Johannes Metger, 3. Oeltjen, 4. Julius Dimer
- 1901 Paris 1–2. Stanislaus Sittenfeld, Adolf Albin, 3. Jean Taubenhaus, 4. Maurice Billecard
- 1901 Craigside 1. Amos Burn, 2. Henry Ernest Atkins, 3. Gunston, 4. Bellingham
- 1902 Paris 1. Dawid Janowski, 2. Jean Taubenhaus, 3. Theodor von Scheve, 4. Adolf Albin
- 1902 Carlsbad (Triangular) 1. Viktor Tietz, 2. Dawid Janowski, Moritz Porges
- 1902 Vienna 1. Leopold Löwy, Jr, 2. Augustin Neumann, 3. Julius Perlis, 4. Siegfried Reginald Wolf
- 1902 Berlin 1. Ossip Bernstein, 2–3. Erich Cohn, Oskar Piotrowski, 4. Iosif Januschpolski
- 1903 Hamburg 1. Hugo Süchting, 2. Carl Carls, 3. Johannes Metger, 4. Julius Dimer
- 1904 Munich 1. Rudolf Spielmann, 2. Friedrich Köhnlein, 3. Moissei Eljaschoff, 4. Kürschner
- 1904 Lemberg 1. Emil Gross, 2. Karol Irzykowski, 3. Ignatz von Popiel, 4. Kasimir de Weydlich
- 1904 Sylvan Beach 1. Frank Marshall, 2. Howard, 3. Roething, 4. Guckemus
- 1905 Hamburg 1. Rudolf Spielmann, 2. Julius Dimer, 3. Oeltjen, 4. Oskar Antze
- 1905 Ostend 1. Georg Marco, 2–3. Frank Marshall, Paul Saladin Leonhardt, 4. Richard Teichmann
- 1905 Łódź (Triangular) 1–2. Akiba Rubinstein, Gersz Salwe, 3. Fedor Duz-Khotimirsky
- 1906 Trenton Falls 1. Emanuel Lasker, 2. Curt, 3. Albert Fox, 4. Raubitschek
- 1906 Łódź 1. Akiba Rubinstein, 2. Mikhail Chigorin, 3. Alexander Flamberg, 4. Gersz Salwe
- 1906 St. Petersburg 1. Simon Alapin, 2. Mikhail Chigorin, 3. Evtifiev, 4. Eugene Znosko-Borovsky
- 1906 Bremen 1–2. Wilhelm Hilse, Sohège, 3. Julius Dimer, 4. Oskar Antze
- 1907 Hanover 1. Carl Carls, 2–3. Hugo Süchting, Albert Edelheim, 4. Wilhelm Hilse
- 1907 Warsaw 1. Alexander Flamberg, 2. Salomon Langleben, 3. Lucian Einbild, 4. Jan Kleczyński Jr.
- 1908 Łódź (Triangular) 1. Akiba Rubinstein, 2. Frank Marshall, 3. Gersz Salwe
- 1908 Warsaw 1. Simon Alapin, 2. Gersz Salwe, 3. Alexander Flamberg, 4. Salomon Langleben
- 1908 St. Petersburg 1. Sergey Lebedev, 2. Sergey von Freymann, 3. Alexander Romanovsky, 4. Grigory Helbach
- 1908 Trenton Falls 1. Clarence Howell, 2. Leon Rosen, 3. Sharp, 4. Eugene Delmar
- 1909 Göteborg 1. Milan Vidmar, 2. Paul Saladin Leonhardt, 3. Oldřich Duras, 4. Sjøberg
- 1909 Munich 1. Richard Teichmann, 2. Simon Alapin, 3. Rudolf Spielmann, 4. Dawid Przepiórka
- 1909 Munich 1. Hans Fahrni, 2. Savielly Tartakower, 3–4. Simon Alapin, Rudolf Spielmann
- 1911 Munich 1. Simon Alapin, 2. Rudolf Spielmann, 3. Solomon Rosenthal, 4. Hans Fahrni
- 1911 Munich 1. Simon Alapin, 2. Gersz Rotlewi, 3. Rudolf Spielmann, 4. Hans Fahrni
- 1911 Barmbek 1. Wilhelm Hilse, 2–3. Hugo Süchting, Julius Dimer, 4. Carl Carls
- 1911 Kitzingen (Triangular) 1. Andreas Duhm, 2. Hrdina, 3. Friedrich Köhnlein
- 1911 Amsterdam 1–2. Frank Marshall, Arnold van Foreest, 3. Adolf Georg Olland, 4. Johannes Esser
- 1913 New York 1. Frank Marshall 2. Oldřich Duras, 3. Oscar Chajes, 4. Charles Jaffe
- 1913 Warsaw (Triangular) 1. Alexander Flamberg, 2. Oldřich Duras, 3. Moishe Lowtzky
- 1913 Łódź 1. Gersz Salwe, 2. Rosenbaum, 3. Gottesdiener, 4. Moshe Hirschbein
- 1913 St. Petersburg 1–2. Alexander Alekhine, Grigory Levenfish, 3–4. Oldřich Duras, Eugene Znosko-Borovsky
- 1914 Kiev 1. Alexander Evensohn, 2. Efim Bogoljubov, 3. Fedir Bohatyrchuk, 4. Nikolai Grekov
- 1914 Paris 1–2. Frank Marshall, Alexander Alekhine, 3. André Muffang, 4. B. Hallegua
- 1914 Berlin 1–2. Rudolf Spielmann, Erich Cohn, 3. Richard Teichmann, 4. Jacques Mieses
- 1914 Vienna 1. Siegfried Reginald Wolf, 2. Ernst Grünfeld, 3. Sauer, 4. Willman
- 1915 Vienna 1. Józef Dominik, 2–3. Josef Krejcik, Kalikst Morawski, 4. Richard Réti
- 1915 Atlantic City (Triangular) 1. Frank Marshall, 2. Sharp, 3. Moorman
- 1915/16 Triberg (Triangular) 1. Efim Bogoljubov, 2. Ilya Rabinovich, 3. Alexey Selezniev
- 1916 Tampa 1. Moorman, 2–3. Jackson Whipps Showalter, Traube, 4. Hernandes
- 1916 Budapest 1. Gyula Breyer, 2. Zoltán von Balla, 3. Richard Réti, 4. Johannes Esser
- 1916/17 Vienna (Triangular) 1. Carl Schlechter, 2. Milan Vidmar, 3. Arthur Kaufmann
- 1916/17 Łódź 1. Gersz Salwe, 2. Teodor Regedziński, 3. Samuel Factor, 4. Moshe Hirschbein
- 1917 Triberg 1–2. Ilya Rabinovich, Alexey Selezniev, 3. Efim Bogoljubov, 4. Samuil Weinstein
- 1917 Havana (Triangular) 1. Clarence Howell, 2. Juan Corzo, 3. Blanco
- 1917 London (Triangular) 1. George Edward Wainwright, 2. Philip Sergeant, 3. Macdonald
- 1917/18 Vienna 1. Milan Vidmar, 2. Savielly Tartakower, 3. Carl Schlechter, 4. Lajos Asztalos
- 1918 Berlin 1. Milan Vidmar, 2. Carl Schlechter, 3. Jacques Mieses, 4. Akiba Rubinstein
- 1918 Berlin 1. Emanuel Lasker, 2. Akiba Rubinstein, 3. Carl Schlechter, 4. Siegbert Tarrasch
- 1918 Moscow (Triangular) 1. Alexander Alekhine, 2. Vladimir Nenarokov, 3. Abram Rabinovich
- 1918 Amsterdam 1. Max Marchand, 2–3. van Gelder, Arnold van Foreest, 4. Abraham Speijer
- 1918 Hertogenbosch 1–2. Jan Willem te Kolsté, Gerard Oskam, 3. Max Marchand, 4. Norden
- 1919 Stockholm 1. Rudolf Spielmann, 2. Akiba Rubinstein, 3. Efim Bogoljubov, 4. Richard Réti
- 1919 Berlin 1. Efim Bogoljubov, 2. Alexey Selezniev, 3–4. Rudolf Spielmann, Richard Réti
- 1919 Berlin 1. Alexey Selezniev, 2. Efim Bogoljubov, 3. Friedrich Sämisch, 4. Curt von Bardeleben
- 1919 Berlin (Triangular) 1. Walter John, 2. Ehrhardt Post, 3. Bernhard Gregory
- 1919 Troy 1. Abraham Kupchik, 2. Charles Jaffe, 3. Oscar Chajes, 4. Jacob Bernstein
- 1919/20 Hastings 1. Frederick Yates, 2. Scott, 3. Henry Ernest Atkins, 4. Richard Griffith
- 1920 Genova 1. Stefano Rosselli, 2. Davide Marotti, 3. Dolci, 4. Bernheimer
- 1920 Utrecht 1. Géza Maróczy, 2. Savielly Tartakower, 3. Adolf Olland, 4. Gerard Oskam
- 1920 Amsterdam 1. Max Euwe, 2. te Kolsté, 3. van Hoorn, 4. Max Marchand
- 1920 Rotterdam 1. Akiba Rubinstein, 2–3. Samuel Factor, Abraham Speijer, 4. van Gelder
- 1920 Łódź 1. Moshe Hirschbein, 2. Rosenbaum, 3. Gottesdiener, 4. Jakub Kolski
- 1920 Vienna 1. Savielly Tartakower, 2. Ernst Grünfeld, 3. Géza Maróczy, 4. Benjamin Blumenfeld
- 1921 Kiel 1. Efim Bogoljubov, 2–3. Alfred Brinckmann, Friedrich Sämisch, 4. Richard Réti
- 1921 Hamburg 1. Heinrich Wagner, 2. Paul Krüger, 3. Wilhelm Schönmann, 4. Julius Dimer
- 1921 New York 1–2. Frank Marshall, Forsberg, 3. Charles Jaffe, 4 Albert Hodges
- 1921 Utrecht 1. Adolf Olland, 2. Willem Schelfhout, 3. Victor Kahn, 4. Piccardt
- 1921 Triberg 1. Akiba Rubinstein, 2–3. Efim Bogoljubov, Rudolf Spielmann, 4. Alexey Selezniev
- 1921 Baden-Baden 1. Dietrich Duhm, 2. Weissinger, 3. Sartori, 4. Andreas Duhm
- 1922 Mannheim (Triangular) 1. Siegbert Tarrasch, 2. Paul Saladin Leonhardt, 3. Jacques Mieses
- 1922 Paris (Triangular) 1. André Muffang, 2. Frédéric Lazard, 3. Amédée Gibaud
- 1922 Scheveningen 1–2. Max Euwe, George Salto Fontein, 3–4. Rudolf Loman, Alexander Rueb
- 1924 Berlin 1. Paul Johner, 2. Akiba Rubinstein, 3. Richard Teichmann, 4. Jacques Mieses
- 1925 Amsterdam 1. Jacques Davidson, 2. Max Euwe, 3–4. Friedrich Sämisch, Henri Weenink
- 1925 Bern 1. Alexander Alekhine, 2. Arnold Aurbach, 3. Oskar Naegeli, 4. Walter Michel
- 1925 London (Triangular) 1. Akiba Rubinstein, 2–3. George Alan Thomas, Frederick Yates
- 1925 Bromley: 1. Hermanis Matisons, 2. Karel Skalička, 3. Karel Hromádka, 4. Fricis Apšenieks
- 1925 Wiesbaden 1. Max Euwe, 2. Rudolf Spielmann, 3. Georg Schories, 4. Friedrich Sämisch
- 1925 Kolin 1. Richard Réti, 2–3. Karel Opočenský, Max Walter, 4. Formanek
- 1925 Győr 1–2. Ferenc Chalupetzky, Győző Exner, 3. Horváth, 4. Galgóczy
- 1925 Bucharest 1. Alexandru Tyroler, 2. Sigmund Herland, 3. Iosif Mendelssohn, 4. Stefan Erdélyi
- 1925 Leningrad 1. Solomon Gotthilf, 2–3. Carlos Torre Repetto, Yakov Rokhlin, 4. Abram Model
- 1926 Amsterdam 1. Edgard Colle, 2. Savielly Tartakower, 3. Max Euwe, 4. Pannekoek
- 1927 Utrecht 1. Max Euwe, 2. Jacques Davidson, 3. Adolf Olland, 4. Arnold van Foreest
- 1927 Warsaw 1. Stanisław Kohn, 2–3. Kazimierz Makarczyk, Savielly Tartakower, 4. Akiba Rubinstein
- 1928 Hamburg 1. Heinrich Wagner, 2. Herbert Heinicke, 3. Wilhelm Schönmann, 4. Rodatz
- 1928 Stockholm 1. Richard Réti, 2–3. Erik Lundin, Gösta Stoltz, 4. Gideon Ståhlberg
- 1929 London 1. Frederick Yates, 2. William Winter, 3–4. Mir Sultan Khan, Adrián García Conde
- 1929 Maastricht 1. Marcel Engelmann, 2. Victor Soultanbeieff, 3. Salo Landau, 4. Courtens
- 1929 Ghent 1. Edgard Colle, 2. Georges Koltanowski, 3. Marcel Engelmann, 4. Varlin
- 1929 Odessa (Triangular) 1. Boris Verlinsky, 2. Sergey von Freymann, 3. Ilya Kan
- 1930 Rotterdam 1. Savielly Tartakower, 2–3. Daniël Noteboom, Sándor Takács, 4. Salo Landau
- 1930 Berlin 1–2. Ludwig Rellstab, Friedrich Sämisch, 3. Carl Ahues, 4. Kurt Richter
- 1930 Berlin 1. Isaac Kashdan, 2. Karl Helling, 3. Herman Steiner, 4. Friedrich Sämisch
- 1930 Bucharest 1. Taubmann, 2. Abraham Baratz, 3. Iosif Mendelssohn, 4. Wechsler
- 1930 Le Pont 1. Hans Johner, 2. Ossip Bernstein, 3. Oskar Naegeli, 4. Walter Michel
- 1930 Liége 1. Victor Soultanbeieff, 2. Isaías Pleci, 3. Liubarski, 4. Mendlewicz
- 1931 Amsterdam 1–2. Max Euwe, Salo Landau, 3. Daniël Noteboom, 4. Selman
- 1931 Rotterdam 1. Salo Landau, 2. Edgard Colle, 3. Savielly Tartakower, 4. Akiba Rubinstein
- 1932 Bern 1–3. Alexander Alekhine, Oskar Naegeli, Erwin Voellmy, 4. Fritz Gygli
- 1933 Bern 1. Oskar Naegeli, 2. Salo Flohr, 3–4. Fritz Gygli, Hans Johner
- 1933 Bremen 1–2. Carl Carls, Carl Ahues, 3. Heinrich Wagner, 4. Oskar Antze
- 1933 Warsaw 1. Mieczysław Najdorf, 2. Paulin Frydman, 3. Leon Kremer, 4. Kazimierz Makarczyk
- 1933 Moscow 1. Fedir Bohatyrchuk, 2. Boris Verlinsky, 3. Nikolai Riumin, 4. Peter Romanovsky
- 1934 Rotterdam 1. Alexander Alekhine, 2. Salo Landau, 3. Muehring, 4. Hamming
- 1935 Łódź 1. Izaak Appel, 2. Achilles Frydman, 3–4. Jakub Kolski, Edward Gerstenfeld
- 1935 Łódź 1. Jakub Kolski, 2–3. Izaak Appel, Teodor Regedziński, 4. Achilles Frydman
- 1935 Łódź 1. Savielly Tartakower, 2. Izaak Appel, 3. Teodor Regedziński, 4. Jakub Kolski
- 1935 Göteborg 1. Gösta Danielsson, 2. Ernst Larsson, 3. Allan Nilsson, 4. John B. Lindberg
- 1936 Amsterdam 1–2. Alexander Alekhine, Salo Landau, 3–4. Jongedijk, Koomen
- 1936 Brussels 1–2. Jacques Mieses, Jerochov, 3. Albéric O'Kelly de Galway, 4. Jung
- 1937 Bad Nauheim, Stuttgart, Garmisch 1. Max Euwe, 2–3. Efim Bogoljubov, Alexander Alekhine, 4. Friedrich Sämisch
- 1937 Nice 1. Alexander Alekhine, 2. Barbato Rometti, 3. Victor Kahn, 4. Brian Reilly
- 1937 Bremen 1. Efim Bogoljubov, 2–3. Friedrich Sämisch, Heinrich Reinhardt, 4. Carl Carls
- 1937 Brussels 1. Albéric O'Kelly de Galway, 2. Movsas Feigins, 3. Paul Devos, 4. Emil Diemer
- 1937 Riga 1. Paul List, 2. Movsas Feigins, 3. Fricis Apšenieks, 4. Teodors Bergs
- 1937 Riga (Triangular) 1. Vladimirs Petrovs, 2. Fricis Apšenieks, 3. Movsas Feigins
- 1937 Vienna 1. Paul Keres, 2. Wolfgang Weil, 3. Albert Becker, 4. David Podhorzer
- 1937 Warsaw 1–4. Gideon Ståhlberg, Antoni Wojciechowski, Lajos Steiner, Mieczysław Najdorf
- 1937 Zoppot 1. Ludwig Rellstab, 2. Gideon Ståhlberg, 3. Lajos Steiner, 4. Herbert Ludwigshausen
- 1938 Bergedorf 1. Heinrich Reinhardt, 2–3. Efim Bogoljubov, Friedrich Sämisch, 4. Herbert Heinicke
- 1938 Beverwijk 1. Philip Bakker, 2. van Dijk, 3. Zoontjes, 4. van den Bronk
- 1938 Moscow 1–2. Ilya Kan, Viacheslav Ragozin, 3–4. Vladimir Alatortsev, Nikolai Riumin
- 1939 Baarn (I) 1. Salo Flohr, 2. Haije Kramer, 3. László Szabó, 4. van Epen
- 1939 Baarn (II) 1. Max Euwe, 2. George Salto Fontein, 3. Salo Landau, 4. Spanjaard
- 1939 Beverwijk 1. Nicolaas Cortlever, 2. van Steenis, 3. Bakker, 4. van Dijk
- 1939 Copenhagen (Triangular) 1. Holger Norman-Hansen, 2. Christian Poulsen, 3. Jens Enevoldsen
- 1939 Buenos Aires (Triangular) 1. Carlos Maderna, 2. Luis Piazzini, 3. José Gerschman
- 1940 Buenos Aires (Triangular) 1. Carlos Guimard, 2. Aristide Gromer, 3. Franciszek Sulik
- 1940 Randers 1–2. Jens Enevoldsen, Christian Poulsen, 3–4. Bjørn Nielsen, Sørensen
- 1940 Baarn 1. Salo Landau, 2–3. Max Euwe, Hans Kmoch, 4. Haije Kramer
- 1940 Beverwijk 1. Max Euwe, 2. Hendrik Jan Van Steenis, 3. Nicolaas Cortlever, 4. Arthur Wijnans
- 1940 Delft 1. Hans Kmoch, 2. Max Euwe, 3. Johannes van den Bosch, 4. Salo Landau
- 1941 Beverwijk 1. Arthur Wijnans, 2. Nicolaas Cortlever, 3. Max Euwe, 4. Carel Sammelius
- 1942 Rio de Janeiro 1. Duarte, 2. João de Souza Mendes, 3. Burlamaqui, 4. Moses.
- 1943 Rio de Janeiro 1. Erich Eliskases, 2. Oswaldo Cruz Filho, 3. Walter Cruz, 4. João de Souza Mendes
- 1951 Buenos Aires (Triangular) 1. Carlos Maderna, 2. Jacobo Bolbochán, 3. Heinrich Reinhardt
- 1952 Sofia (Triangular) 1. Alexander Tsvetkov, 2. Milko Bobotsov, 3. Nikolay Minev
- 1954 Vilnius 1. Vladas Mikėnas, 2. Ratmir Kholmov, 3–4. Isakas Vistaneckis, Viacheslav Ragozin
- 1956 Leningrad (Triangular) 1. Mark Taimanov, 2. Yuri Averbakh, 3. Boris Spassky
- 1957 Sofia (Triangular) 1. Oleg Neikirch, 2. Aleksandar Matanović, 3. Bogdan Śliwa
- 1960 Madrid 1. Svetozar Gligorić, 2–3. Lajos Portisch, Arturo Pomar, 4. Jan Hein Donner
- 1960 Buenos Aires (Triangular) 1. Samuel Schweber, 2. Heinrich Reinhardt, 3. Erich Eliskases
- 1961 São Paulo (Triangular) 1. Eugênio German, 2. Rodrigo Flores, 3. Bernardo Wexler
- 1962 Stockholm (Triangular) 1. Leonid Stein, 2. Pal Benko, 3. Svetozar Gligorić
- 1963 Leningrad (Triangular) 1. Leonid Stein, 2. Boris Spassky, 3. Ratmir Kholmov
- 1964 Rio de Janeiro (Triangular) 1. Oscar Quiñones, 2. Samuel Schweber, 3. Mauro de Athayde
- 1967 Buenos Aires 1. Henrique Mecking, 2. Julio Bolbochán, 3. Oscar Panno, 4. Alberto Foguelman
- 1973 Chicago (Triangular) 1. Robert Byrne, 2. Samuel Reshevsky, 3. Lubomir Kavalek
- 1974 Buenos Aires (Triangular) 1. Jorge Szmetan, 2. Jorge Rubinetti, 3. Ricardo Grinberg
- 1976 Manila 1. Eugenio Torre, 2. Anatoly Karpov, 3. Ljubomir Ljubojević, 4. Walter Browne
- 1976 Amsterdam 1. Anatoly Karpov, 2. Walter Browne, 3–4. Jan Timman, Fridrik Olafsson
- 1979 South Africa 1. Viktor Korchnoi, 2. Wolfgang Unzicker, 3. Tony Miles, 4. Anatoly Lein
- 1979 Waddinxveen 1. Anatoly Karpov, 2. Lubomir Kavalek, 3. Vlastimil Hort, 4. Gennadi Sosonko
- 1980 Puerto Madryn 1–2. Tony Miles, Ljubomir Ljubojević, 3. Oscar Panno, 4. Miguel Quinteros
- 1981 Johannesburg 1. Ulf Andersson, 2–3. Viktor Korchnoi, Robert Hübner, 4. John Nunn
- 1989 Santiago de Chile 1. Gilberto Milos, 2.-3. Ivan Morovic Fernandez, Oscar Panno 4. Roberto Cifuentes Parada
- 1991 Rybinsk 1. Marat Makarov, 2–3. Vladimir Kramnik, Maxim Sorokin, 4. Andrei Kharlov
- 1993 San Nicolas (Triangular) 1. Darcy Lima, 2. Gilberto Milos, 3. Daniel Cámpora
- 1993 Chalkidiki, Afitos 1. Boris Gelfand, 2..-3. Michael Adams, Alexei Shirov, 4. Vassilios Kotronias
- 2000 São Paulo 1. Rafael Leitão, 2. Giovanni Vescovi, 3. Jaime Sunye Neto, 4. Gilberto Milos
- 2008 Reykjavik 1–2. Lajos Portisch, Vlastimil Hort, 3. Friðrik Ólafsson, 4. Pal Benkö
- 2009 Bilbao 1. Levon Aronian, 2–3. Alexander Grischuk, Sergey Karjakin, 4. Alexei Shirov
- 2010 Shanghai 1. Alexei Shirov, 2–3. Levon Aronian, Vladimir Kramnik, 4. Wang Hao
- 2010 Bilbao 1. Vladimir Kramnik, 2. Viswanathan Anand, 3. Magnus Carlsen, 4. Alexei Shirov
- 2010 Mexico City 1. Judit Polgár, 2. Veselin Topalov, 3. Vassily Ivanchuk, 4. Manuel León Hoyos

== See also ==
- Chess tournament
- List of strong chess tournaments
