= Ostend 1907 chess tournament =

The tournament was divided into two sections: the Championship Tournament and the Masters' Tournament. The first section was for players who had won an international tournament. The Championship Tournament took place in the Casino of Ostend from 16 May to 14 June 1907. Dawid Janowski, Siegbert Tarrasch, Carl Schlechter, and Frank Marshall accepted the invitation, while Emanuel Lasker and Géza Maróczy declined and were replaced by Amos Burn and Mikhail Chigorin.

In the tournament, the term "grandmaster" was used, so these players were described as grandmasters for the purposes of the tournament. After winning the tournament, Tarrasch was crowned the "World Champion Tournament Player" by the tournament organizers. Lasker finally agreed to a title match in 1908, and beat Tarrasch convincingly (+8 –3 =5).

The Masters' Tournament was a thirty-player round-robin. It was played from 16 May to 25 June. Ossip Bernstein and Akiba Rubinstein ended equal as winners at Ostend B. This tournament is arguably the largest all-play-all chess competition ever held on top-level.

Jacques Mieses's victory over Eugene Znosko-Borovsky in a Vienna Game received the tournament's brilliancy prize. The British Chess Magazine described Mieses on this occasion as "in his happiest vein".

== Championship Tournament ==
#	Player	1	2	3	4	5	6	Total
1	Siegbert Tarrasch (German Empire)	xxxx	½½10	½1½1	½1½½	1½10	1½01	12½
2	Carl Schlechter (Austria)	½½01	xxxx	11½½	½010	½1½½	½½11	12
3	Dawid Janowski (France)	½0½0	00½½	xxxx	1010	1111	11½1	11½
4	Frank Marshall (United States)	½0½½	½101	0101	xxxx	0½11	½½11	11½
5	Amos Burn (United Kingdom)	0½01	½0½½	0000	1½00	xxxx	½111	8
6	Mikhail Chigorin (Russian Empire)	0½10	½½00	00½0	½½00	½000	xxxx	4½

== Masters' Tournament ==
#	Player	1	2	3	4	5	6	7	8	9	10	11	12	13	14	15	16	17	18	19	20	21	22	23	24	25	26	27	28	29	Total
1	Ossip Bernstein (Russian Empire)	*	½	0	1	½	1	1	1	1	½	1	1	0	½	½	1	1	0	½	1	1	½	0	1	1	1	0	1	1	19½
2	Akiba Rubinstein (Poland)	½	*	½	1	½	0	1	1	½	½	½	0	1	½	½	½	0	1	1	1	1	½	½	1	1	1	1	1	1	19½
3	Jacques Mieses (German Empire)	1	½	*	1	0	½	1	0	½	1	1	1	0	1	1	1	1	1	½	0	1	1	1	1	0	1	0	0	1	19
4	Aron Nimzowitsch (Russian Empire)	0	0	0	*	1	½	0	½	½	½	½	1	1	1	½	½	1	1	½	½	1	1	1	½	1	1	1	1	1	19
5	Leo Forgacs (Hungary)	½	½	1	0	*	½	1	0	½	½	1	½	½	1	½	1	½	1	½	1	0	½	1	½	1	½	1	1	1	18½
6	Richard Teichmann (German Empire)	0	1	½	½	½	*	½	½	½	0	½	0	1	0	1	0	½	1	1	0	1	1	1	1	1	1	1	1	1	18
7	Oldřich Duras (Bohemia)	0	0	0	1	0	½	*	½	0	½	1	0	1	0	1	½	1	1	1	1	½	1	1	1	0	1	1	1	1	17½
8	Gersz Salwe (Poland)/	0	0	1	½	1	½	½	*	0	1	1	½	1	1	½	1	1	1	½	½	½	½	1	1	½	0	0	0	1	17
9	Georg Marco (Austria)	0	½	½	½	½	½	1	1	*	0	½	½	½	1	½	1	½	½	½	½	0	1	0	1	1	1	½	½	1	16½
10	Walter John (German Empire)	½	½	0	½	½	1	½	0	1	*	½	½	1	1	½	½	½	0	½	½	½	½	1	½	1	0	½	1	1	16
11	Saviely Tartakower (Kingdom of Galicia and Lodomeria)	0	½	0	½	0	½	0	0	½	½	*	½	½	1	1	1	1	½	½	1	1	0	1	½	1	1	1	1	0	16
12	Eugene Znosko-Borovsky (Russian Empire)	0	1	0	0	½	1	1	½	½	½	½	*	½	0	1	0	½	1	½	1	1	½	½	½	½	0	1	1	0	15
13	Erich Cohn (German Empire)	1	0	1	0	½	0	0	0	½	0	½	½	*	1	0	½	1	0	1	1	1	1	1	½	½	½	0	1	1	15
14	Rudolf Spielmann (Austria)	½	½	0	0	0	1	1	0	0	0	0	1	0	*	½	0	1	½	½	1	1	1	0	½	1	1	1	1	1	15
15	Joseph Henry Blackburne (United Kingdom)	½	½	0	½	½	0	0	½	½	½	0	0	1	½	*	1	0	1	0	0	1	1	1	1	1	1	1	½	0	14½
16	Julius Perlis (Kingdom of Galicia and Lodomeria)	0	½	0	½	0	1	½	0	0	½	0	1	½	1	0	*	0	0	½	1	0	0	1	1	1	1	1	½	1	13½
17	Rudolf Swiderski (German Empire)	0	1	0	0	½	½	0	0	½	½	0	½	0	0	1	1	*	1	½	0	0	½	1	½	0	1	1	1	1	13
18	Georg Schories (German Empire)	1	0	0	0	0	0	0	0	½	1	½	0	1	½	0	1	0	*	1	1	1	1	0	1	1	0	0	1	0	12½
19	Hugo Süchting (German Empire)	½	0	½	½	½	0	0	½	½	½	½	½	0	½	1	½	½	0	*	0	½	½	½	½	0	½	1	1	1	12½
20	Moritz Billecard (France)	0	0	1	½	0	1	0	½	½	½	0	0	0	0	1	0	1	0	1	*	1	½	½	1	1	0	½	0	½	12
21	Wilhelm Cohn (German Empire)	0	0	0	0	1	0	½	½	1	½	0	0	0	0	0	1	1	0	½	0	*	1	1	½	½	1	1	0	1	12
22	Paul Saladin Leonhardt (German Empire)	½	½	0	0	½	0	0	½	0	½	1	½	0	0	0	1	½	0	½	½	0	*	0	½	1	1	1	½	1	11½
23	Theodor von Scheve (German Empire)	1	½	0	0	0	0	0	0	1	0	0	½	0	1	0	0	0	1	½	½	0	1	*	½	0	1	1	½	1	11
24	Johannes Metger (German Empire)	0	0	0	½	½	0	0	0	0	½	½	½	½	½	0	0	½	0	½	0	½	½	½	*	1	1	1	1	1	11
25	Hector William Shoosmith (United Kingdom)	0	0	1	0	0	0	1	½	0	0	0	½	½	0	0	0	1	0	1	0	½	0	1	0	*	½	1	0	1	9½
26	Francis Lee (United Kingdom)	0	0	0	0	½	0	0	1	0	1	0	1	½	0	0	0	0	1	½	1	0	0	0	0	½	*	½	1	1	9½
27	Louis van Vliet (United Kingdom)	1	0	1	0	0	0	0	1	½	½	0	0	1	0	0	0	0	1	0	½	0	0	0	0	0	½	*	1	½	8½
28	Franz Jacob (German Empire)	0	0	1	0	0	0	0	1	½	0	0	0	0	0	½	½	0	0	0	1	1	½	½	0	1	0	0	*	1	8½
29	James Mortimer (United Kingdom)	0	0	0	0	0	0	0	0	0	0	1	1	0	0	1	0	0	1	0	½	0	0	0	0	0	0	½	0	*	5

Note: Paul Johner, Switzerland, had to withdraw from the tournament after six games (annulated in the final standings).
