= Moissei Eljaschoff =

Chess player of Jewish origin

Moissei Zacharowitch Eljaschoff (24 June 1870, Kovno – 1919) was a Russian chess master.

He was the older brother of Israel Isidor Elyashev, the first Yiddish literary critic.

He won a match against Carl Carls (3 : 1) at Berlin 1902. He tied for 3rd-6th at Hanover 1902 (the 13th DSB Congress, Haupturnier B, Leo Fleischmann won), took 2nd behind Hans Fahrni at Coburg 1904 (the 14th DSB Congress, Haupturnier B), took 3rd at Munich 1904 (Quadrangular, Rudolf Spielmann won), tied for 3rd-5th at Munich 1906 (Hexagonal, Aron Nimzowitsch won), took 13th in the Ostend 1907 chess tournament (Hauptturnier B, Georg Schories won).

His best achievement was the 2nd place, behind Friedrich Köhnlein, at Düsseldorf 1908 (the 16th DSB Congress, Haupturnier A). He shared for 4th at St. Petersburg 1909 (Alexander Alekhine won), tied for 5-6th at Hamburg 1910 (the 17th DSB Congress, Haupturnier B), took 20th at St. Petersburg 1911 (Stepan Levitsky won), tied for 7-8th at Breslau 1912 (the 18th DSB Congress, Haupturnier A, Bernhard Gregory won), took 17th at Vilna 1912 (Haupturnier A, Karel Hromadka won), and tied for 17-18th at St. Petersburg 1913/14 (All-Russian Masters' Tournament, Alekhine and Nimzowitsch won).
