= Bernhard Gregory =

German chess player (1879–1939)

- Born: 22 April 1879; Reval, Governorate of Estonia, Russian Empire
- Died: 2 February 1939 (aged 59); Berlin, Nazi Germany
- Occupation: Chess master
- Spouse(s): Ida Hempel (1902–1914); Helene Walsleben (1931–1939)
- Parents: Ferdinand Oscar Gregory (father); Alexandrine Emmi Gregory (mother)

Bernhard Gregory (22 April [O.S. 10 April] 1879 – 2 February 1939) was a Baltic German chess master.

== Life ==
Bernhard Gregory was born on 22 April [O.S. 10 April] 1879 in Reval, Governorate of Estonia, Russian Empire (now Tallinn, Estonia) as a son of advocate Ferdinand Oscar Gregory (born 1843 in Kolu Manor, Heinrichshof, now in Vaiatu village) and Alexandrine Emmi Gregory (born 1854 in Vändra). Bernhard studied at the Dome School of Reval from 1885 to 1893. In 1898 he moved to Munich to study chemistry and engineering, which he later continued in Berlin. In 1902 he married at the age of 23 with an 18-year-old Ida Hempel from Leipzig. The couple lived in Schöneberg, Berlin, and had two daughters, Iselin (1903) and Maud Dolly (1905). In 1914 the couple divorced, Ida moved back to Leipzig with the daughters.

== Chess ==
In 1902, he tied for 16–19th in Hannver (13th DSB–Congress, Hauptturnier, Walter John won). In 1903/04, he tied for 9–10th in Berlin (Horatio Caro won). In 1904, he shared 1st in Reval, and tied for 7–8th in Coburg (14th DSB–Congress, Hauptturnier, Augustin Neumann and Milan Vidmar won). In 1905, he took 6th in Barmen (D tourn, Georg Schories won), and tied for 14–15th in Berlin (Erich Cohn won). In 1906, he took 5th in Nuremberg (15th DSB–Congress, Hauptturnier, Friedrich Köhnlein won). In 1907, he tied for 6–7th in Berlin (František Treybal won). In 1908, he took 2nd, behind Wilhelm Cohn, in Berlin. In December 1908, he lost a match to Frank James Marshall (1 : 4) in Berlin.

In 1909, he took 3rd in Saint Petersburg (All-Russian Amateur Tournament, Alexander Alekhine won). In 1910, he tied for 14–15th in Hamburg (17th DSB–Congress, Hauptturnier, Gersz Rotlewi won), and took 5th in Berlin (Richard Teichmann won). In 1912, he won in Breslau (Wrocław) (18th DSB–Congress, Hauptturnier). In 1913/14, he tied for 17–18th in Saint Petersburg (All-Russian Masters' Tournament, 8th RUS-ch, Alekhine and Aron Nimzowitsch won). In 1917, he took 9th in Berlin (Paul Johner and W. John won).

After World War I, he took 3rd at Berlin 1919 (Triangular, W. John won). In 1920, he tied for 6–7th in Berlin (Alexey Selezniev won). In 1921, he took 12th in Hamburg (21st DSB–Congress, Ehrhardt Post won). In 1927, he took 13th in Berlin (Berthold Koch won).

He played in the following team matches: Berlin vs Vienna in 1911, Berlin vs Prague in 1913, and Berlin vs Holland (by telegraph) in 1920.
