= Oskar Antze =

German chess player (1878–1962)

Oskar (Oscar) Hans Antze (24 October 1878 – 23 April 1962 ) was a German chess player.

Antze was born in Cologne, the son of a physician. After his Abitur he had a Medical education at the University of Marburg, the University of Kiel and the Humboldt University of Berlin, receiving a Doctorate (Dr. med.). His 1903 medical doctoral thesis was titled Über primären Lungenkrebs ("On Primary Lung Cancer"). From 1900 to 1962 he had a Doctor's office in Bremen.

He shared 1st with Hugo Süchting at Kiel 1900 (Quadrangular); took 4th at Hamburg 1905 (Quadrangular); took 4th at Bremen 1906 (Quadrangular); won at Leipzig 1913.

After World War I, Dr. Antze tied for 3rd–5th at Bad Oeynhausen 1922 (22nd DSB–Congress, Ehrhardt Post won); took 6th at Hannover 1926 (Aron Nimzowitsch won); drew a short match with Efim Bogoljubow (1 : 1) at Bremen 1927; tied for 8th–9th at Duisburg 1929 (26th DSB–Congress, Carl Ahues won); took 8th at Bad Aachen 1934 (2nd GER-ch, Carl Carls won); took 4th at Bremen 1933 (Quadrangular). He died in Bremen in 1962.
