= Wilhelm Hilse =

German chess player (1878–1940)

Wilhelm Heinrich Hilse (26 June 1878 – 30 November 1940) was a German chess master.

He tied for 12/13th at Coburg 1904 (DSB Congress, Hauptturnier A, Augustin Neumann won), shared 1st at Bremen 1906 (Quadrangular), took 4th at Hannover 1907 (Quadrangular), won at Barmbek 1911 (Quadrangular), and took 13th at Mannheim 1914 (DSB-Congress, Hauptturnier A, B. Hallegua won).

After World War I, he shared 1st at Hamburg 1921, took 7th at Kiel 1922, took 11th at Bad Oeynhausen 1922 (DSB-Congress, Ehrhardt Post won), tied for 4/5th at Frankfurt 1923 (DSB-Congress, Ernst Grünfeld won), tied for 3rd–5th at Vienna 1926 (DSV Kongress, Karl Gilg and Heinrich Wagner won), tied for 10/11th at Magdeburg 1927 (DSB-Congress, Rudolf Spielmann won), and shared 3rd at Bremen 1927 (Efim Bogoljubow won).

He played for Germany in a match against Austria at Vienna 1926, and in the 2nd Chess Olympiad at The Hague 1928.
