= Salomon Langleben =

Polish chess player

Salomon Langleben (Hebrew: סלומון לאנגלבן; 1862 in Warsaw – February 8, 1939 in Warsaw) was a Polish chess master.

He lived for many years in the United States of America. In 1894 he won in Buffalo. At the end of the 19th century, he returned to Poland.

He won, ahead of Alexander Flamberg, at Warsaw 1900. He took 4th at Warsaw 1908 (Quadrangular, Simon Alapin won); took 2nd, behind Akiba Rubinstein, at Warsaw 1909; took 3rd at Warsaw 1910 (Flamberg won); tied for 4–5th at Saint Petersburg 1911 (Stepan Levitsky won); took 4th at Warsaw 1911/12 (Rubinstein won); tied for 4-5th at Łódź 1912 (Efim Bogoljubow won); tied for 8-10th at Vilna 1912 (B tourn, Karel Hromadka won); tied for 4–5th at Sankt Petersburg 1913 (Alexander Evensohn won); took 2nd at Warsaw 1917.
