= Julius Dimer =

German chess player

Julius Dimer (1 August 1871 – 20 October 1945) was a German chess master.

At the beginning of his career, he played in several mini tournaments (Quadrangular) in Germany; at Altona 1897, Elmshorn 1898, Munich 1900, Kiel 1901, Hamburg 1903, Hamburg 1905, and Bremen 1906. He tied for 7-8th at Eisenach 1896 (the 10th DSB Congress, Robert Henry Barnes won), tied for 7-8th at Amsterdam 1899 (Henry Ernest Atkins won), won at Hamburg/Altona 1906, won at Harburg 1909, and shared 2nd at Barmbek 1911.

After World War I, he took 4th at Hamburg 1921, tied for 5-6th at Kiel 1922, and took 8th at Hamburg 1927.
