= Moshe Hirschbein =

Polish chess player

Moshe Hirschbein (var. Hirszbein, Hirszbain, Hirszbajn) (1894 – 1940) was a Polish chess master.

Born into a Jewish family, he lived in Łódź, playing in many local tournaments. In 1912, he took 7th (Efim Bogoljubow won), twice took 4th (Quadrangular) in 1913 and 1916/17 (both won by Gersz Salwe, and won a match against Samuel Factor (+4 –2 =4) in 1917. After World War I, he won (Quadrangular) in 1920/21, took 3rd in 1925, and tied for 14-15th in the 2nd Polish Chess Championship, Akiba Rubinstein won) in 1927.

He died during World War II in the Lodz Ghetto.
