= Zdzisław Belsitzmann =

Polish chess player

Zdzisław Belsitzmann (ca. 1890–1920) was a Polish chess master.

Belsitzmann lived in Warsaw, where he played several times in tournaments with top Polish chess masters. In 1913, he drew a match against Salomon Langleben (+1 –1 =2). He tied for 4-5th in 1916/17, and 3rd-4th in 1917, both with Alexander Flamberg, and both behind Akiba Rubinstein and Moishe Lowtzky. His best achievement was in 1919/20 when he won, followed by Flamberg, Rubinstein, Dawid Przepiórka, etc. He died a short time later during the Polish-Soviet War.
