= Samuel Factor =

Samuel Factor may refer to:

- Samuel Factor (chess player)
- Samuel Factor (politician)
