= Hermann von Hanneken =

Hermann von Hanneken may refer to:

- Hermann von Hanneken (soldier) (1890–1981), German general
- Hermann von Hanneken (chess player) (1810–1886), German chess player
