= Hilse =

Hilse is a German surname. Notable people with the surname include:

- Karsten Hilse (born 1964), German politician
- Peter Hilse (born 1962), German racing cyclist
- Wilhelm Hilse (1878–1940), German chess master

== See also ==
- Hilbe
- Hilsea
