= Siegfried Wolf =

Siegfried Wolf can refer to:

- Siegfried Wolf (footballer), German footballer
- Siegfried Reginald Wolf, Austrian chess master
