= Henri Weenink =

Dutch chess player (1892–1931)

Henri Gerard Marie Weenink (17 October 1892 in Amsterdam – 2 December 1931) was a Dutch chess player and a problem composer.

He took 2nd, behind Fick, at Amsterdam 1918/19; tied for 4-5th at Amsterdam 1919 (Richard Réti and Max Marchand won), tied for 3-6th at Rotterdam 1919 (Réti won); shared 2nd, behind Abraham Speijer, at Amsterdam 1919; took 6th at Amsterdam 1920 (Réti won), tied for 2nd-3rd at Amsterdam 1921 (Quadrangular), shared 13th at Scheveningen 1923 (System 10+10, Paul Johner and Rudolf Spielmann won), tied for 3rd-4th at Amsterdam 1925 (Quadrangular), tied for 2nd-3rd with Salo Landau, behind Max Euwe, at Amsterdam 1929 (NED-ch), tied for 8-9th at Liege 1930 (Savielly Tartakower won), and won, ahead of Euwe and Spielmann, at Amsterdam 1930.

Weenink played four times for Netherlands in Chess Olympiads:

- In the 1st Chess Olympiad at London 1927 (+5 –7 =3);
- In the 2nd Chess Olympiad at The Hague 1928 (+3 –6 =7);
- In the 3rd Chess Olympiad at Hamburg 1930 (+7 –3 =6);
- In the 4th Chess Olympiad at Prague 1931 (+2 –9 =6).

Weenink died of tuberculosis at the age of 39.
