= Theodor von Scheve =

German chess player and writer (1851–1922)

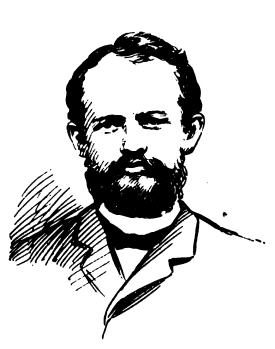
Theodor von Scheve

Theodor von Scheve (11 June 1851 – 19 April 1922) was a German chess master and writer.

Scheve was born in Cosel in the Prussian Province of Silesia. An army officer by profession, Scheve lived in Breslau, where he co-founded the Schachverein Breslau Anderssen, and later in Berlin, where he played in many local tournaments. He died in Patschkau.

In Berlin, Scheve took 3rd, behind Berthold Lasker and Siegbert Tarrasch, and took 2nd, behind Curt von Bardeleben, in 1881; tied for 6–8th in 1883 (Hermann von Gottschall won); took 2nd, behind Max Harmonist, and took 8th in 1887 (Paul Klemens Seuffert won); won and took 2nd (Quadrangular) in 1889; twice tied for 3rd- 4th in 1890 and 1891/92 (Horatio Caro won), took 3rd in 1893, won in 1894, shared 1st in 1898/99, and tied for 2nd–3rd in 1899/1900.

Scheve drew two matches against Carl August Walbrodt (+4 –4 =2) and Curt von Bardeleben (+4 –4 =4) in Berlin in 1891.

Scheve shared 1st with S. Löwenthal at Frankfurt 1884. He tied for 17–18th at Frankfurt 1887 (5th DSB–Congress, George Henry Mackenzie won); took 4th at Leipzig 1888 (Bardeleben and Fritz Riemann won); tied for 7–9th at Manchester 1890 (6th BCA–Congress, Tarrasch won); tied for 11–13th at Dresden 1892 (7th DSB–Congress, Tarrasch won); took 18th at Leipzig 1894 (8th DSB–Congress, Tarrasch won).

Scheve's best achievement was 3rd–4th place at Monte Carlo 1901 (Dawid Janowski won). He took 3rd at Paris 1902 (Quadrangular); tied for 4–5th at Vienna 1902 (Janowski and Heinrich Wolf won); took 17th at Monte Carlo 1902 (Géza Maróczy won); took 5th at Monte Carlo 1904 (Thematic tournament, Rice Gambit, Frank Marshall and Rudolf Swiderski won); tied for 7–8th at Berlin 1907 (Jubiläumturnier, Richard Teichmann won); tied for 23–24th in Ostend (B tourn, Ossip Bernstein and Akiba Rubinstein won); tied for 8–9th at San Remo 1911 (Hans Fahrni won), and tied for 10–11th at Berlin 1917 (Walter John and Paul Johner won.

He wrote a philosophy essay Der Geist des Schachspiels (Berlin 1919).
