= Erich Cohn =

German chess player (1884–1918)

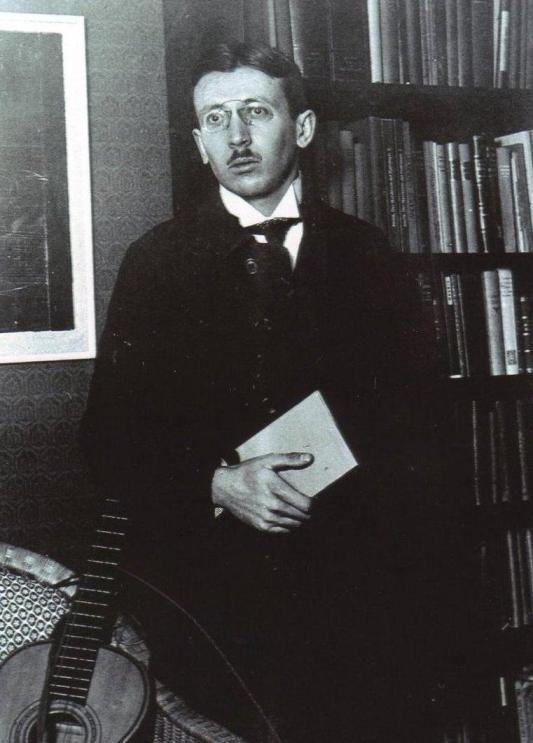
Erich Cohn

Erich Cohn (Hebrew: אריק קוהן, March 1, 1884, Berlin – August 28, 1918, France) was a German chess master.

He won or tied for 1st in several tournaments in Berlin (1902, 1905, 1906, 1909/10, 1914). In strong tournaments, he tied for 11-12th at Berlin 1903 (Horatio Caro won). He took 10th at Coburg 1904 (the 14th DSB Congress, Hauptturnier A, Augustin Neumann won). In 1905, he took 5th in Barmen (A tourn). In 1906, he took 6th at Nuremberg 1906 (the 15th DSB Kongress; Frank Marshall won). In 1907, he took 6th in Berlin (Richard Teichmann won), tied for 12-14th in Ostend (B tourn; Ossip Bernstein and Akiba Rubinstein won), and took 20th in Carlsbad (Rubinstein won).

In 1908, he took 19th in Vienna (Oldřich Duras, Géza Maróczy and Carl Schlechter won). In 1909, he tied for 8-9th in St Petersburg (Emanuel Lasker and Rubinstein won), and took 3rd in Stockholm (Rudolf Spielmann won). In 1911, he tied for 14-16th in Carlsbad (Teichmann won). In 1912, he tied for 15-17th in Bad Pistyan (Rubinstein won), tied for 13-14th in Breslau (18th DSB Kongress; Duras and Rubinstein won), took 3rd in Abbazia (Spielmann won) and took 2nd, behind Alexander Alekhine, in Stockholm (the 8th Nordic Chess Championship). He tied for 2nd-3rd with Paul Krüger, behind Kurt Pahl, at Berlin 1913, and shared 1st with Spielmann at Berlin 1914 (Quadrangular).

In matches, he won against Carl Carls (+5 –1 =1), drew with Ehrhardt Post (+4 –4 =1), both at Berlin 1906, and lost to Rudolf Spielmann (+1 –2 =0) at Munich 1906, and Edward Lasker (+0 –1 =3) at Berlin 1909.

He died in the western front, as a field doctor of the Red Cross, at the end of World War I.

== See also ==
- List of Jewish chess players
