= Herbert Heinicke =

German chess player (1905–1988)

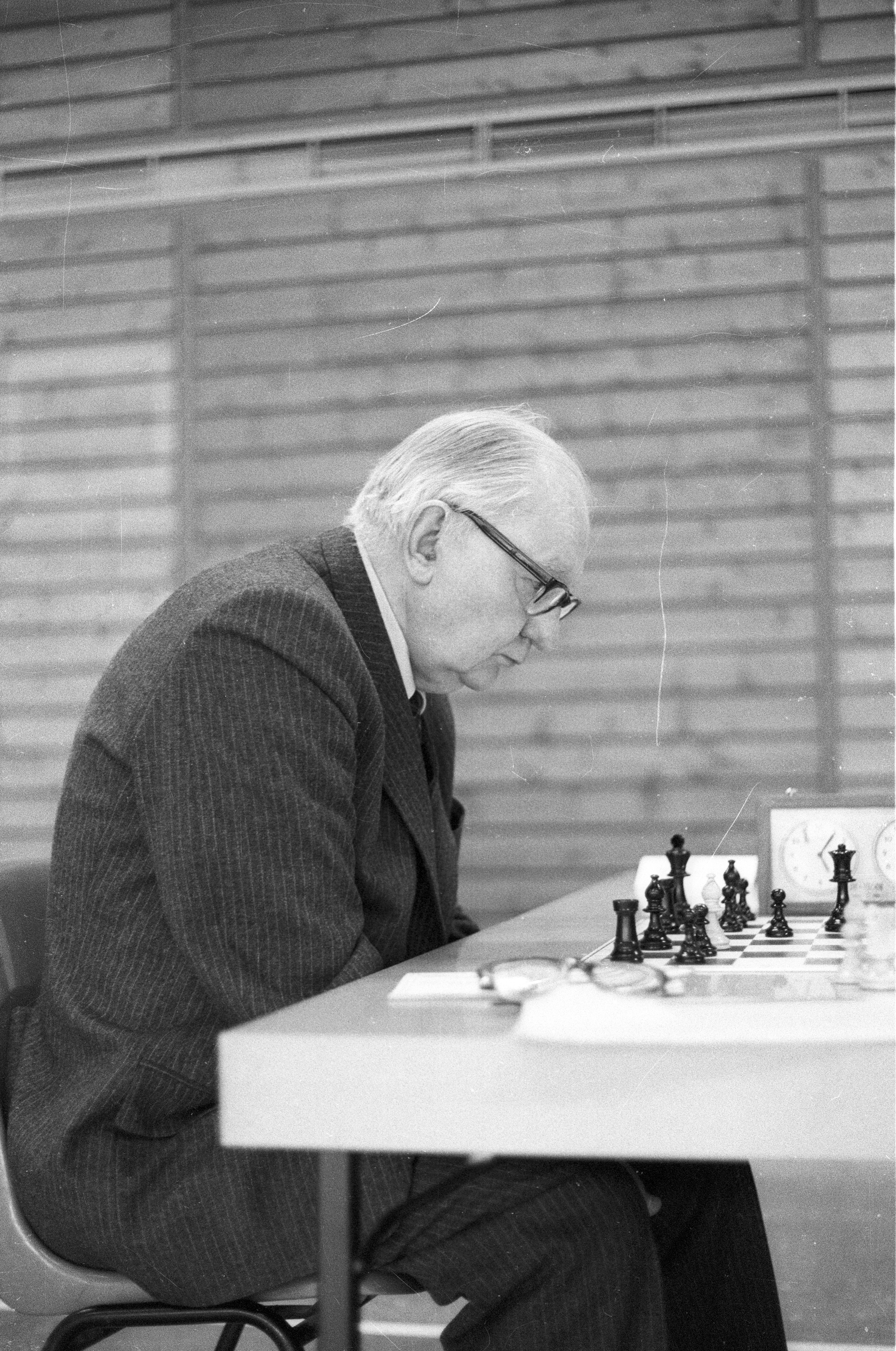

Herbert Heinicke (14 March 1905, Porto Alegre, Brazil – 4 April 1988, Hamburg) was a German chess master.

== Biography ==
He, like Carlos Otto Junge and Klaus Junge, left South America for Hamburg, Germany.

In 1930, he took 2nd, behind Heinrich Wagner, and lost a match to him (3,5 : 8,5) in Hamburg. In 1931, he won a match against Heinrich Reinhardt in Hamburg (6,5 : 3,5). In 1932, he took 3rd, behind Alfred Brinckmann and Kurt Richter, in Kiel, and won in Hamburg–Altona. In 1933, he won in Hamburg–Bahrenfeld, and took 3rd in Swinemünde (Ludwig Engels and Koch won).

He tied for 4-6th at Bad Aachen 1934 (2nd GER-ch, Carl Carls won); tied for 2nd-3rd with Ludwig Rellstab, behind Efim Bogoljubow, at Bad Saarow 1935; tied for 6-7th at Bad Nauheim 1936 (Alexander Alekhine and Paul Keres won); tied for 4-5th at Bad Harzburg 1938 (Vasja Pirc won); tied for 2nd-4th at Bad Elster 1939 (Erich Eliskases won), and tied for 6-9th at Bad Oeynhausen 1939 (6th GER-ch, Eliskases won).

During World War II, he took 3rd at Berlin 1940 (Bogoljubow won); tied for 6-9th at Bad Oeynhausen 1940 (7th GER-ch, Georg Kieninger won), shared 1st with Klaus Junge at Hamburg 1941, and shared 1st with Karl Poschauko at Graz 1941.

After the war, he tied for 2nd-3rd at Bad Harzburg 1946 (Carl Ahues won); tied for 4-5th at Hamburg 1947 (Lange won); took 5th at Essen 1947 (Kieninger won); tied for 3rd-4th at Lüneburg 1947 (Bogoljubow won); tied for 2nd-3rd at Oldenburg 1948 (Povilas Tautvaišas won); won at Hamburg 1949; tied for 3rd-4th at Oldenburg 1949 (Elmārs Zemgalis and Bogoljubow won), and shared 6th at Bad Pyrmont (FRG-ch, Bogoljubow won).

He took 2nd, behind Lothar Schmid, at Travemünde 1951; shared 1st at Hagen 1952; tied for 2nd-3rd at Hamburg 1952; tied for 2nd-3rd, behind Wolfgang Unzicker, at Berlin 1953 (FRG-ch).

Heinicke played for Germany in Chess Olympiads:

- In 1936, at eighth board in 3rd unofficial Olympiad in Munich (+8 –0 =10);
- In 1952, at fourth board in 10th Chess Olympiad in Helsinki (+2 –5 =3).

He won team bronze medal and individual silver medal at Munich 1936.

He also represented West Germany in several friendly matches vs Yugoslavia (1951, 1952, 1954, 1956), The Netherlands (1951, 1954), Switzerland (1952), Austria (1953), and in 1st European Chess Team Championship at Vienna 1957.

Awarded the IM title in 1953.
