= Martin Bier =

German chess player

Martin (Max) Bier (1 April 1854 – August 1934) was a German chess master. He won at Wesselburen 1879, took 4th at Leipzig 1879 (the 1st DSB Congress, Berthold Englisch won), took 7th at Braunschweig 1880 (the 13th WDSB Kongress, Louis Paulsen won), tied for 13-14th at Nuremberg 1883 (the 3rd DSB-Congress, Szymon Winawer won), took 18th at Hamburg 1885 (the 4th DSB-Congress, Isidor Gunsberg won), took 7th at Hamburg 1905 (Paul Saladin Leonhardt won), and shared 4th at Hamburg 1913 (Paul Krüger won).
