= Hugo Süchting =

German chess player (1874–1916)

Personal information
- Born: Hugo Süchting; 8 October 1874 Brackrade, Province of Schleswig-Holstein, Kingdom of Prussia, German Empire
- Died: 27 December 1916 (aged 42) Lüttow-Valluhn, Grand Duchy of Mecklenburg-Schwerin, German Empire

Chess career
- Country: German Empire

Hugo Süchting (Suechting) (8 October 1874 – 27 December 1916) was a German chess player.

He won at Kiel 1893 (the 8th DSB Congress, Hauptturnier) took 13th at Leipzig 1894 (the 9th DSB-Congress, Siegbert Tarrasch won), shared 2nd with Ignatz von Popiel, behind Robert Henry Barnes, at Eisenach 1896 (the 10th DSB-Congress), and took 15th at Berlin 1897 (Rudolf Charousek won). He played also in quadrangular tournaments; took 2nd (Altona 1897), and twice shared 1st (Elmshorn 1898, Kiel 1900).

In the 20th century, he tied for 14-15th at Hannover 1902 (the 13th DSB-Congress won by Dawid Janowski), won at Hamburg 1903, tied for 8-9th at Coburg 1904 (the 14th DSB-Congress, Curt von Bardeleben, Carl Schlechter and Rudolf Swiderski won), tied for 11-12th at Barmen 1905 (Géza Maróczy and Janowski won), tied for 5-6th at Stockholm 1906 (Ossip Bernstein and Schlechter won), tied for 18-19th at Ostend 1907 (Bernstein and Akiba Rubinstein won), tied for 13-14th at Prague 1908 (Oldřich Duras and Schlechter won), tied for 16-18th at Vienna 1908 (Duras, Maróczy and Schlechter won), tied for 6-7th at Düsseldorf 1908 (the 16th DSB-Congress, Frank Marshall won), and tied for 14-16th at Carlsbad 1911 (Richard Teichmann won).

He won two matches against Paul Saladin Leonhardt (2.5 : 1.5) and Carl Carls (2 : 1), both at Hamburg 1911, and drew a match with Leonhardt (2 : 2) at Hamburg 1912.

He contributed the Süchting Variation to modern opening theory, 1. d4 d5 2. c4 c6 3. Nf3 Nf6 4. Nc3 Qb6!?.
