= Oscar Chajes =

American chess player (1873–1928)

Oscar Chajes

Oscar Chajes (HA-yes; December 14, 1873 – February 28, 1928) was an American chess player.

== Biography ==
Chajes was Jewish and was born in Brody, Galicia, Austria-Hungary, in what is now Ukraine. In 1909, he won in the U.S. Open Championship in Excelsior, Minnesota. The next year he took second in the same event at Chicago 1910. In January/February 1911, he tied for 3rd-4th in New York behind Frank Marshall and José Raúl Capablanca. In August/September 1911, he tied for 23-26th in Karlsbad (Richard Teichmann won), but won brilliancy prizes for his victories over Savielly Tartakower and Julius Perlis. In 1913, he tied for 5-6th in New York. In 1913, he tied for 4-5th in New York. In February/March 1913, he tied for 4-5th in Havana. In 1913, he took 3rd in New York (Quadrangular).

During World War I, in 1914, he tied for 2nd-3rd in New York (Edward Lasker won). In 1915, he tied for 3rd-4th in New York. In January/February 1916, he took 3rd in New York (Rice Memorial). The event was won by José Raúl Capablanca. In 1917, he won in Rochester (New York State Championship). In July 1918, he took 2nd, behind Abraham Kupchik, in Rye Beach, N.Y. In October/November 1918, he took 4th in New York (Manhattan Chess Club Championship).

After the war, in August 1919, he took 3rd in Troy, N.Y. In 1920, he won in New York. In 1920, he tied for 1st-2nd in New York. In 1923, he tied for 17-18th in Karlovy Vary. In 1923, he tied for 7-8th in Lake Hopatcong, New Jersey (9th American Chess Congress). In 1923/24, he won in New York (Manhattan CC-ch). In 1926, he took 11th in Chicago (Marshall won). In 1926, he took 4th in New York.

Chajes played two matches against Dawid Janowski: he lost in Havana in 1913 (+0 −2 =1), and won in 1918 in New York (+7 −5 =10).

He was the last person to defeat José Raúl Capablanca, at New York 1916, prior to Capablanca's eight-year undefeated stretch from 1916 to 1924.

Chajes died in New York City in 1928.

== Notable chess games ==
Carlsbad 1911

Position: e8 black rook, f8 black rook, g8 black king, a7 white pawn, b7 white queen, g7 black pawn, b6 white rook, h6 black pawn, d4 black queen, h4 white knight, d3 black pawn, e3 black pawn, f3 white pawn, g3 white pawn, h3 white bishop, e2 white pawn, g2 white king, h2 white pawn

Chajes vs. Perlis, after 33...Qd4

Chajes received two brilliancy prizes for games at Carlsbad 1911, including this victory as White over Julius Perlis. (See diagram at right. Notes by Walter Korn.)

34. a8(Q)!!

Black seems safe, with two advanced pawns threatening to promote. The point of this decoy is revealed by White's next move.

34. ... Rxa8
35. Rxh6!!

White threatens 36.Be6#, and 35...gxh6 36.Be6+ Kh8 37.Ng6# is also mate, so Black covers e6.

35. ... Rae8
36. Qb3+ Rf7
37. Re6!

Korn gives this an exclamation mark, but 37.Rh8+ would also win quickly.

37. ... Rxe6
38. Bxe6 dxe2
39. Bxf7+ Resigns

Other notable games:

- Alfred Kreymborg vs Oscar Chajes, New York 1911, Sicilian, Dragon, Classical Variation, B78, 0-1
- Oscar Chajes vs Savielly Tartakower, Karlsbad 1911, Indian Game, Wade-Tartakower Defense, A46, 1-0
- Chajes vs José Raúl Capablanca, New York 1916, Rice Memorial, French, MacCutcheon, Duras Variation, C12, 1-0
- Oscar Chajes vs Dawid Janowski, New York 1918, Sicilian, Accelerated Fianchetto, B34, 1-0
- Oscar Chajes vs Aron Nimzowitsch, Karlsbad 1923, French, Winawer, Delayed Exchange Variation, C01, 1-0

== See also ==
- List of Jewish chess players
