= Siegfried Reginald Wolf =

Siegfried Reginald Wolf (19 December 1867—5 January 1951) was an Austrian chess master who competed in top European tournaments from the 1890s to the early 1930s.

A native of Prague (until 1918, the capital of the Austro-Hungarian province of Bohemia), Siegfried Reginald Wolf played all of his tournaments in Vienna. He took 8th (Jacques Schwarz won) in 1893; took 10th (Georg Marco won) in 1897; took 2nd, behind Julius Perlis, in 1901; took 6th (Carl Schlechter in 1912; tied for 9-10th (Savielly Tartakower won) in 1923; took 4th (Albert Becker won) in 1924; shared 1st (with Becker) in the 1925 Austrian Championship; took 6th (Rudolf Spielmann won) in 1926; tied for 7-8th (Karl Gilg and Heinrich Wagner won) in 1926; tied for 5-7th (Ernst Grünfeld won) in 1927; took 4th (Hans Müller and Becker won) in 1927; tied for 13-14th (Richard Réti won) in 1928, and tied for 12-13th (Hans Kmoch and Spielmann won) in 1929.

Wolf represented Austria in the following Chess Olympiads:

- In 1927 at fourth board in the 1st Chess Olympiad in London (+2 –2 =7);
- In 1928 at fourth board in the 2nd Chess Olympiad in The Hague (+3 –3 =6);
- In 1930 at first reserve board in the 3rd Chess Olympiad in Hamburg (+4 –2 =3).

Siegfried Reginald Wolf's career as a chess master ended at the start of the 1930s when he was in his mid-sixties. Following Hitler's 1933 rise to power in Germany and the subsequent annexation of Austria in 1938, he was able to immigrate to the British mandate of Palestine (which became Israel in 1948) and died in the port city of Haifa two weeks after his 83rd birthday.
