= Haije Kramer =

Dutch chess player (1917–2004)

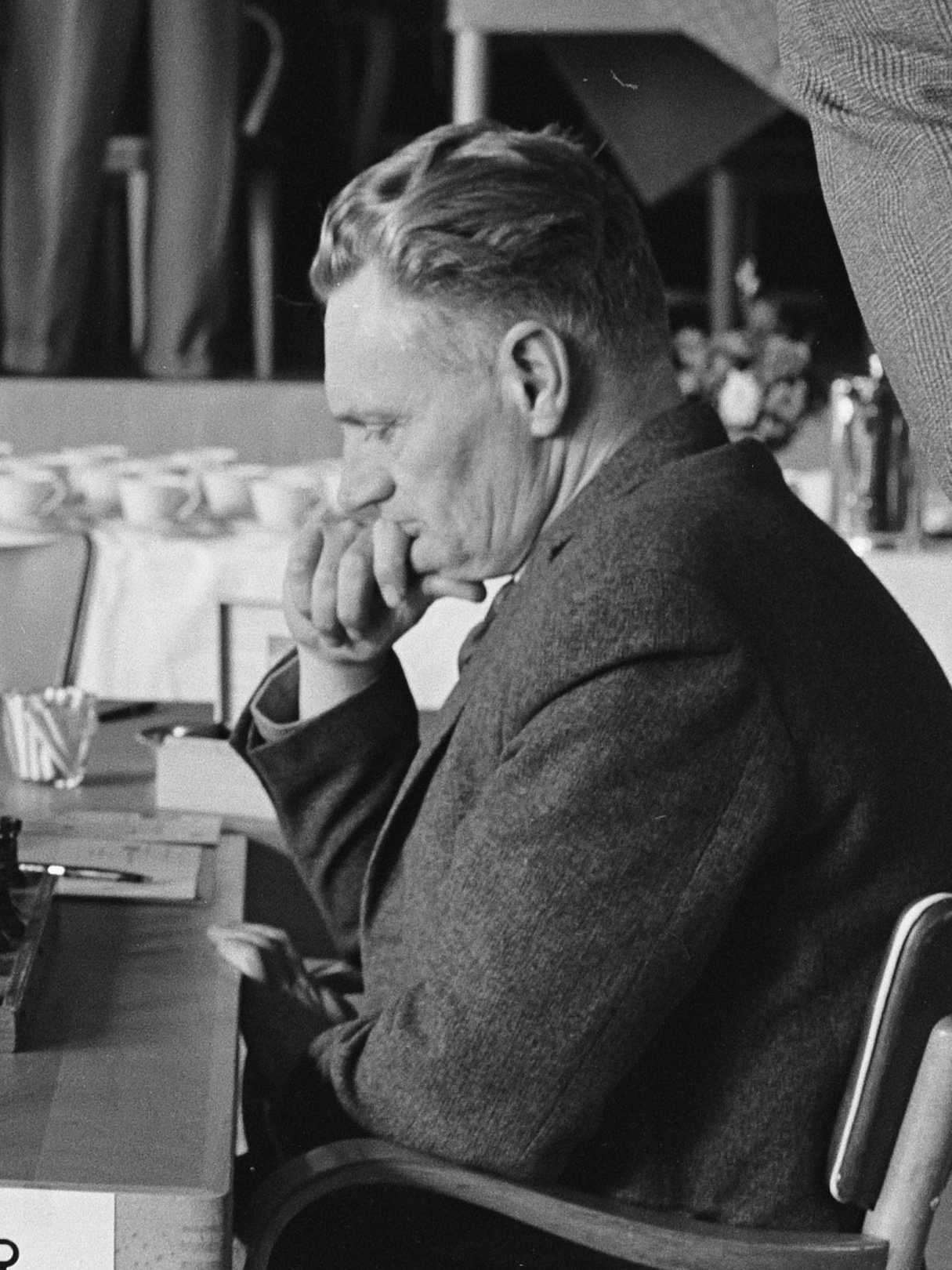
- Kramer in 1962
- Country: Netherlands
- Born: 24 November 1917; Leeuwarden, Netherlands
- Died: 11 July 2004 (aged 86)
- Title: International Master (1954), International Correspondence Chess Grandmaster (1984)
- FIDE rating: 2330 (July 1971)
- ICCF rating: 2585 (July 1991)

Haije Kramer (24 November 1917, Leeuwarden – 11 July 2004) was a Dutch chess master and theoretician.

He began his chess career during World War II. He took 4th at Baarn 1940 (Quadrangular, Salo Landau won), took 3rd at The Hague 1940 (George Salto Fontein won), took 4th at Leeuwarden 1940 (Nicolaas Cortlever, S. Landau and Lodewijk Prins won), and took 5th at Baarn 1941 (Max Euwe won). Kramer lost two matches to Euwe 3–5 in 1940 and 1–7 in 1941. He played in Dutch Chess Championship at Leeuwarden 1942.

After the war, he took 3rd in the Hoogovens tournament at Beverwijk 1946 (Alberic O'Kelly de Galway won), won at Leiden 1946 (C-tournament), tied for 6–8th at Zaandam 1946 (M. Euwe won), tied for 2nd–3rd with George Alan Thomas, behind C. Vlagsma, at Baarn 1947, shared 1st at Leeuwarden 1947, took 2nd, behind L. Prins, at Nijmegen 1948, won at Vimperk 1949, tied for 3rd-4t at Beverwijk 1951 (Hermann Pilnik won). He twice participated in zonal tournaments; took 11th at Bad Pyrmont 1951 (Svetozar Gligorić won) and took 8th at Munich 1954 (Wolfgang Unzicker won).

Kramer represented the Netherlands in Chess Olympiads seven times from 1950–1962, and won individual bronze medal at Munich 1958.

He is a co-author of Losbladige Schaakberichten and Het middenspel ("The Middle Game", The Hague 1952) with M. Euwe.

Awarded the International Master title in 1954 and the International Correspondence Chess Grandmaster title in 1984.
