= Győző Exner =

Hungarian chess player

Győző (Gyözö) R. Exner (December 22, 1864 – October 14, 1945) was a Hungarian chess master.

Born in Beregszász (Berehove, Yiddish: בערעגסאז), Carpathian Ruthenia (then Hungary, now Ukraine), he moved to Budapest. He shared 2nd at Pressburg 1894, took 3rd at Budapest 1898, tied for 4-5th at Cologne 1898, took 2nd at Budapest 1899 (Triangular), tied for 4-5th at Munich 1900, took 4th at Haarlem 1901 (Adolf Georg Olland won), tied for 9-11th at Hanover 1902, won at Székesfehérvár 1905, tied for 6-7th at Győr 1906, tied for 7-9th Székesfehérvár 1907, shared 4th at Győr 1911, took 14th at Győr 1924 (HUN-ch, Géza Nagy won), took 3rd at Győr 1925, and shared 1st with Ferenc Chalupetzky at Győr 1925 (Quadrangular).

He lost a match to Géza Maróczy (1 : 3) at Budapest 1894, and two matches to Rudolf Charousek (1 : 4 at Budapest 1896, and 2.5 : 7.5 at Tetany 1897).
