= Boris Verlinsky =

Soviet chess player

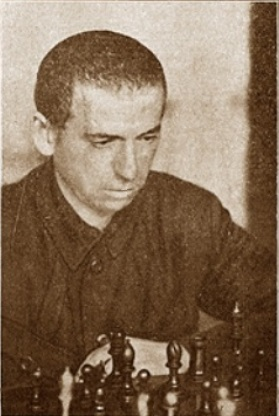
Boris Verlinsky during the 6th Chess Championship of USSR in 1929

Boris Markovich Verlinsky (8 January 1888 – 30 October 1950) was a Soviet chess player, who was awarded the title International Master by FIDE, the world chess federation, in 1950. He was one of the top Soviet players in the 1920s, and was Soviet champion in 1929.

== Biography ==
Verlinsky was born in Bakhmut, Ukraine. He was deaf as a result of meningitis as a youngster. In 1909, Verlinsky tied for 10th-11th in the All-Russian Amateur Tournament. in St. Petersburg. The event was won by Alexander Alekhine. In 1910, he won in Odessa. In 1911, he tied for 6-8th in St. Petersburg (Stepan Levitsky won). In 1912, he won the Odessa Championship. In 1913, he took 3rd in St. Petersburg behind winner Alexander Evenson.

After World War I, Verlinsky moved from Ukraine to Russia. In 1923, he tied for 1st with Kutuzov in Petrograd. In 1923, he took 2nd, behind Sergeev, in Petrograd. In 1924, he tied for 10-11th in Moscow (3rd USSR Chess Championship). The event was won by Efim Bogoljubov. In 1924, he took 2nd, behind Grigoriev, in Moscow (5th Moscow Championship). In 1925, he tied for 2nd-3rd, behind Sergeev, in Moscow (6th Moscow Championship). In August–September 1925, he took 4th in Leningrad (4th USSR Championship) – Bogoljubow won.

In November–December 1925, he tied for 12th-14th in Moscow (1st Moscow International Tournament) – the winner was Bogoljubow. But in this event, Verlinsky scored many beautiful wins over strong players, with perhaps the most impressive being his victory over World Champion José Raúl Capablanca with the Black pieces in a dazzling tactical display. In 1926, Verlinsky tied for 1st with Marsky in Odessa (3rd Ukraine Championship). In 1926, he tied for 8th-9th in Moscow (7th Moscow Championship) – Abram Rabinovich won. In 1928, he won the 9th Moscow City Championship.

In 1929, Boris Verlinsky won the 6th Soviet Championship in Odessa, at the time earning the title of grandmaster. The title was removed in 1931. It has been argued that this was done in order to make Mikhail Botvinnik the first Soviet grandmaster.

According to the site chessmetrics.com, Verlinsky was rated at 2627 in May 1926, and this placed him 16th in the world at that time. Chessmetrics provides historical ratings for players and events throughout chess history. Official ratings were introduced by FIDE only in 1970.

In 1930, Verlinsky took 7th in Moscow (Abram Rabinovich won). In November 1931, he tied for 3rd-6th in Moscow (7th USSR Championship), with a solid score of 10/17 – Botvinnik won. In February 1933, he took 2nd, behind Fedor Bogatyrchuk, in Moscow (Quadrangular). In 1933/34, he took 12th in Moscow (14th Moscow Championship).

Verlinsky was less active at chess in his later life, but could still provide a competitive test for strong masters. After many years away from top competition, he attempted to qualify for the Soviet Championship final in 1945, at age 57, but could only manage 4.5/15 in the semi-final, and did not advance. However, he defeated rising star Bronstein in this event. Verlinsky's last major competitive event was the 1945 Moscow Championship, where he scored 5/16.

Verlinsky was awarded the International Master title by FIDE in 1950, the same year he died at age 62 in Moscow.

== Style and legacy ==
Verlinsky was strong in the classical openings with both colours. At his peak, he won against Alexander Alekhine, José Raúl Capablanca, Efim Bogoljubow, Grigory Levenfish, Akiba Rubinstein, Rudolf Spielmann, and David Bronstein, among others. He was Jewish. Just like majority of other Russian/Soviet masters - Verlinsky never got a chance to compete outside the Russian Empire or the Soviet Union.
