= Hilbe =

Hilbe is a German surname. Notable people with the surname include:

- Alfred Hilbe (1928–2011), Prime Minister of Liechtenstein
- Herbert Hilbe (1938–2021), Mayor of Triesenberg
- Joseph Hilbe (1944–2017), American statistician and philosopher

== See also ==
- Hilse
