= Jakub Kolski =

Polish chess player (1899–1941)

Jakub (Josek) Kolski (1899, Łódź – 1941, Warsaw) was a Polish chess master.

In the period 1920-1930s, Kolski was one of the strongest Łódź chess players. In 1922, he won ahead of Dawid Daniuszewski in Łódź. In 1924, he took 2nd, behind Gottesdiener, in Warsaw (Quadrangular). In 1926, he tied for 3rd-7th in Warsaw (1st POL-ch; Dawid Przepiórka won). In 1927, he tied for 11-12th in Łódź (2nd POL-ch; Akiba Rubinstein won).

He played several matches in Lodz and Warsaw. He drew with Kazimierz Makarczyk (1 : 1) and beat Paulin Frydman (2 : 0) in 1922, lost to Daniuszewski (3 : 5) in 1923, lost to Alexander Flamberg (0.5 : 1.5) and Moishe Lowtzky (0 : 2), drew with Przepiórka (1 : 1) and Leon Schwartzmann (1 : 1) in 1924, lost to P. Frydman (0.5 : 1.5) in 1928, and won against Mieczysław Najdorf (1 : 0) in 1935.

In 1930s, he played in several the city of Łódź championships. He tied for 2nd-3rd in 1930, took 3rd in 1932, tied for 1st-3rd with Izaak Appel and Teodor Regedziński in 1933, took 2nd in 1934, tied for 2nd-3rd in 1935, and tied for 1st-2nd with Appel in 1939.

In 1934, he won in the Łódź Province-ch. In 1935, he won in Łódź (Quadrangular). In 1935, he tied for 6-7th in Warsaw (3rd POL-ch; Savielly Tartakower won). In 1935, he tied for 2nd-3rd with Reuben Fine, behind Tartakower, in Lodz. In 1938, he tied for 10-12th in Lodz (Vasja Pirc won).

At the beginning of World War II, he left Łódź for Warsaw in 1939. Then, he died of starvation in the Warsaw Ghetto.
