= Hans Fahrni =

Swiss chess player (1874–1939)

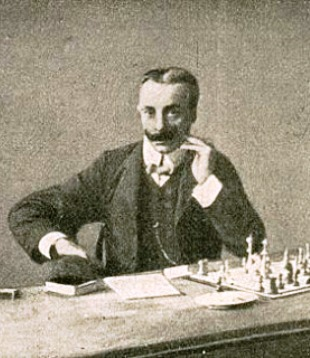
Hans Fahrni

Hans Fahrni (1 October 1874 – 28 May 1939) was a Swiss chess master.

Fahrni was born in Prague in 1874.

In 1902, he took 12th in Hanover (DSB Congress, B tournament, Walter John won). In 1904, he won in Coburg (DSB-Congress, B tournament). In 1905, he tied for 2nd-3rd, behind Paul Leonhardt, in Hamburg. In 1905, he tied for 4-6th in Barmen (B tournament; Leo Fleischmann won). In 1906, he took 15th in Ostend (Carl Schlechter won). In 1906, he tied for 14-15th in Nuremberg (DSB-Congress, Frank Marshall won).

In 1909, Fahrni won, ahead of Savielly Tartakower, Semyon Alapin and Rudolf Spielmann, in Munich (Quadrangular). In 1911, he won in San Remo, took 4th in Munich (Quadrangular, Alapin won), and tied for 23-26th in Carlsbad (Richard Teichmann won).

He was the first master to play 100 opponents simultaneously. It took place in 1911 at Munich.

In 1914, he tied for 7-8th in Baden bei Wien (Spielmann won), and tied for 13-14th in Mannheim (the 19th DSB-Congress, interrupted tournament, Alexander Alekhine won first prize). In 1916, he tied for 4-5th in Triberg (Ilya Rabinovich won).

Fahrni played several matches. In 1907, he lost to Spielmann (+3 –5 =2) in Munich. In 1908, he drew with Alekhine (+1 –1 =1) in Munich. In 1908, he won against Gersz Salwe (+3 –1 =1) in Prague. In 1910, he lost to Spielmann (+3 –4 =4) in Munich. In 1912, he won against Curt von Bardeleben (+3 –0 =1). In 1914, he drew with Leonhardt (+1 –1 =0). In 1916, he drew with Alex Selesnev (+2 –2 =2) in Tiberg. In 1917, he lost to Teichmann (+0 –2 =2) in Zurich.

In 1916, suffering from psychosis, he was hospitalized. He was released, but following a relapse, he was hospitalized again.

In 1922, he was the first to write a chess monograph on the opening 1.e4 Nf6, calling it Alekhine's Defence.

Fahrni died in Ostermundigen, Switzerland, in 1939.

== Books written by Fahrni ==
- Fahrni, Hans: Das Endspiel im Schach: lehrreiche Beispiele: mit hundert Diagrammen /gesammelt und kurz erläutert von Hans Fahrni, Leipzig 1917
- Fahrni, Hans: Die Aljechin-Verteidigung, eine schachtheoretische Analyse, Berlin, 1922
- FAHRNI, HANS & J.W. KEEMINK JR Het eindspel : handleiding voor schakers.
