= Stepan Levitsky =

Russian chess master

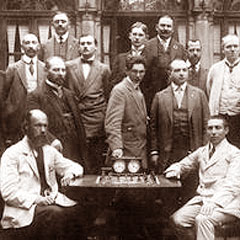
Stepan Levitsky (bottom left) 1913

Stepan Mikhailovich Levitsky (Russian: Степа́н Миха́йлович Леви́тский) (25 April 1876, in Serpukhov – 21 March 1924, in Glubokaya) was a Russian Chess Master.

In 1899 he took third place in Moscow (All Russian Masters’ Tournament, first Russian Championship, Mikhail Chigorin won). In 1903 he took eighth in Kiev (third Russian Championship, Chigorin won). In 1905/06 he tied for 8–11th in St Petersburg (fourth Russian Championship, Gersz Salwe won). In 1907 he took second, behind Eugene Znosko-Borovsky, in St Petersburg. He lost a match to Simon Alapin 0–5 at St Petersburg 1907.

Levitsky won at St Petersburg 1911 (All-Russian Amateur Tournament), thus becoming Russian national chess champion for one year. In July–August 1912, he tied for 13–14th in Breslau (18th DBS-Congress, Akiba Rubinstein and Oldřich Duras won). In August–September 1912, he took third in Vilna (eighth RUS-ch, Rubinstein won). In 1913 he lost a match to Alexander Alekhine 3–7 in St Petersburg. In 1913/14, he took 13th in St Petersburg (ninth Russian Championship, Alekhine and Aron Nimzowitsch won).

== Legacy ==
Levitsky introduced the Queen's Bishop Attack, known as the Levitsky Attack (1.d4 d5 2.Bg5) in the Queen's Pawn Game (ECO code D00). But he is perhaps best remembered by chess players today as the loser in a famous game against Frank Marshall at Breslau 1912 (see Levitsky versus Marshall). Marshall (with the black pieces) concluded with the stunning 23...Qg3!!, which would have forced White to capture Black's queen to prevent immediate checkmate. Unfortunately for Levitsky, this would have left Marshall with at least an extra piece (in one line) or a forced mate (in the other two lines). Levitsky resigned. According to legend, the beauty of Marshall's final combination so moved the spectators that they showered the board with gold pieces.

== See also ==
- List of chess openings
- List of chess openings named after people
