= Jacques Davidson =

Dutch chess player (1890–1969)

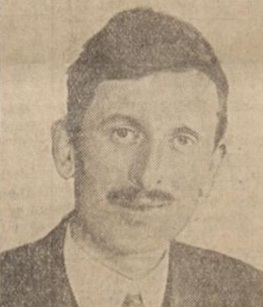
Jacques Davidson

Jacques Davidson (14 November 1890, in Amsterdam – 13 January 1969, in Amsterdam) was a Dutch chess master.

Before World War I, he had lived in London for a number of years. Jacques had played with his father for a stake, he had won, and though he was not paid, the idea had occurred to him that it could be profitable to play chess against wealthy Englishmen. He learned how to proceed from another Dutchman, Rudolf Loman. In the 1920s, Davidson would finish second in the Dutch championship twice, behind Max Euwe.

In 1911, he won a match against Edward Sergeant (2,5 : 0,5) in London. He tied for 3rd-5th at Tunbridge Wells 1911 (Frederick Yates won); took 15th at Cologne 1911 (Moishe Lowtzky won); tied for 2nd-3rd at London 1912 (Harold Godfrey Cole won); took 6th at London 1912 (George Alan Thomas won); tied for 4-7th at London 1913 (Edward Lasker won).

He took 2nd at Nijmegen 1921 (Euwe won); took 8th at The Hague 1921 (Alexander Alekhine won); took 16th at Scheveningen 1923 (10+10, Paul Johner and Rudolf Spielmann won); took twice 2nd, behind Euwe, in Amsterdam (1923, 1924). Davidson won at Amsterdam 1925 (Quadrangular); took 16th at Semmering 1926 (Spielmann won); took 8th at Spa 1926 (Friedrich Sämisch and Thomas won); took 2nd at Utrecht 1927 (Quadrangular, Euwe won); shared 1st with Hartingsvelt at Amsterdam 1927; tied for 5-6th at Amsterdam 1929 (Euwe won).

He played several matches; drew with Richard Teichmann at Berlin 1922, and lost to Euwe (1924, 1927) and Spielmann (1932, 1933), all in Amsterdam.
