= Abraham Speijer =

Dutch chess master

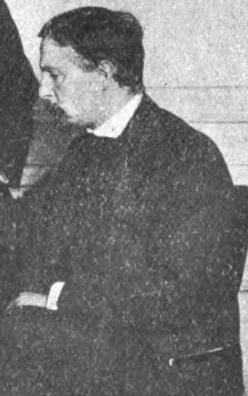
Abraham Speijer

Abraham Speijer (Speyer) (19 November 1873, Amsterdam – 5 September 1956, Amsterdam) was a Dutch chess master.

In smaller tournaments, Speijer had great success, sharing 1st at Munich 1900 (Quadrangular), taking 4th at Hilversum 1903 with 9.5/15 (Paul Saladin Leonhardt won), and tying for 1st with Adolf Olland in the 1st Dutch Chess Championship at Leiden 1909, although Olland was recognized as the Champion. He also shared 1st at Richmond 1912, took 2nd behind Edward Guthlac Sergeant at Hastings Minor 1919 (B tournament), won at Edinburgh 1920, and tied for 2nd-3rd with Samuel Factor, behind Rubinstein, at Rotterdam 1920,

In major international tournaments, Speijer was less successful, usually finishing close to last place. Speijer was 17th out of 19 players at Saint Petersburg 1909 with 6/20, which (Lasker and Akiba Rubinstein won. Speijer also took 15th out of 17 players at Hamburg 1910 with 5.5/16, (DSB Congress, Carl Schlechter won), finished 12th at Cheltenham 1913, and took 12th out of 14 players at Scheveningen 1913 with 4/13. (Alexander Alekhine won), Lastly, Speijer had his best showing at Scheveningen 1923, played in the traditional Scheveningen format, scoring 4.5/10, good for a tie for 10th and 11th place among 20 entrants.

In match play, Speijer lost to world champion Emanuel Lasker in 1908 (+0 -2 =1). Later in his career, Speijer played two matches against a very young Max Euwe. In 1921, Speijer lost by a score of (+1 -4 =0), and in 1923, by a score of (+0 -3 =1), both held in Amsterdam.
