= George Schelto Fontein =

Dutch chess player (1890–1963)

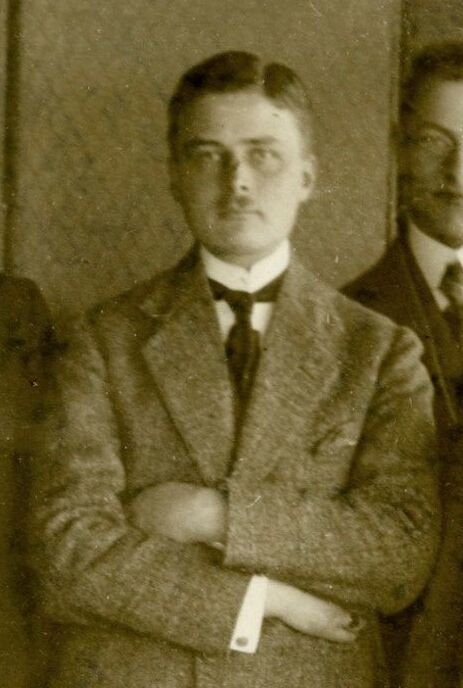
George Schelto Fontein in 1915

George Schelto Fontein (11 July 1890 – 29 November 1963) was a Dutch chess master.

Fontein was born in Harlingen, Friesland, as the son of Willem Adriaan Constantijn Fontein and Teetje Harmens. At the beginning of his career, he took 3rd at Leiden 1909 (the 1st official Netherlands Chess Championship won by Adolf Georg Olland). Then, he tied for 2nd-4th in interrupted Mannheim 1914 chess tournament (Hauptturnier C). During World War I, he tied for 3rd-4th at Scheveningen 1915, tied for 5-6th at Amsterdam 1916, shared 1st with Gerard Oskam at Scheveningen 1917, won at The Hague 1917/18, and tied for 3-4th at Scheveningen 1918.

After the war, he took 2nd at Scheveningen 1919, tied for 2nd-3rd at Scheveningen 1920 (the 4th Silver Queen Cup, Max Euwe won), shared 1st at The Hague 1920, tied for 1st-2nd at Scheveningen 1922 (the 6th Silver Cup), won at The Hague 1923, tied for 7-10th at Amsterdam 1924 (the 6th NED-ch), won at The Hague 1925, and shared 1st with Rudolf Loman at The Hague 1930.

He won a match against Johannes van den Bosch (3–2) at The Hague 1930. He tied for 10-12th at Amsterdam 1938 (the 11th NED-ch), tied for 4-6th at Amsterdam (KNSB) 1939, took 6th at Amsterdam (VARA) 1939, took 2nd at Baarn (II Quadrangular) 1939, and won at The Hague (Keusbeker) 1940. After World War II, he took 2nd at Leiden (A) 1946, and tied for 5-8th at Baarn (Section 2, Savielly Tartakower won).

He played in several friendly matches: The Netherlands – Great Britain in 1914, Berlin – Scheveningen (radiomatch) in 1920, The Netherlands – The Foreigners at Scheveningen 1923, The Hague – Hastings in 1923, The Netherlands – Belgium in 1927, The Netherlands – England in 1937, England – Netherlands in 1938, The Netherlands – England in 1939, The Netherlands – England in 1947.
