= Walter Michel =

Swiss chess player

Walter Michel (November 26, 1888 – September 30, 1969) was a Swiss chess master.

He took 4th at Berne 1925 (Quadrangular, Alexander Alekhine won), won the Swiss Championship at Geneva 1926, took 17th at Semmering 1926 (Rudolf Spielmann won), and took 4th at Le Pont (Quadrangular, Paul Johner won).

Michel played for Switzerland in Chess Olympiads:

- In 1927 at reserve board in the 1st Chess Olympiad in London (+2 –1 =1);
- In 1928 at reserve board in the 2nd Chess Olympiad in The Hague (+6 –3 =2);
- In 1931 at reserve board in the 4th Chess Olympiad in Prague (+5 –3 =7);
- In 1935 at third board in the 6th Chess Olympiad in Warsaw (+2 –9 =4).
