= Gerard Oskam =

Dutch chess player (1880–1952)

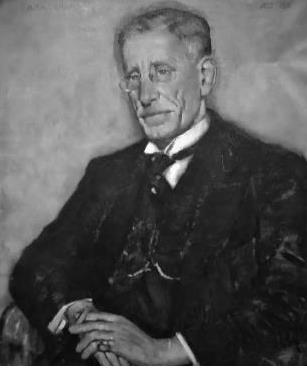
Gerard Oskam

Gerard Cornelis Adrianus Oskam (12 April 1880, The Hague – 7 May 1952) was a Dutch chess master.

He won at Groningen 1900, took 2nd at Leeuwarden 1904, tied for 2nd–3rd at Amsterdam 1905, took 12th at Scheveningen 1905, took 4th at Amsterdam 1907, took 2nd at The Hague 1907, took 3rd at Utrecht 1907, and took 4th at Haarlem 1908 (Johannes Esser won).

During World War I, he tied for 3rd–5th at Rotterdam 1915, shared 2nd at Scheveningen 1915, tied for 7–8th at Amsterdam 1916, twice shared 1st in The Hague and Scheveningen in 1917, won at Rotterdam 1918, twice tied for 5–6th in Arnheim and Scheveningen in 1918, and shared 1st with Jan Willem te Kolsté at 's Hertogenbosch 1918 (Quadrangular).

After the war, he tied for 9–10th in the Hastings International Summer Congress in 1919 (Victory Tournament, José Raúl Capablanca won), took 5th at The Hague 1919 (the 4th Dutch Chess Championship, Max Marchand won), took 5th at Bromley 1920, took 4th at Edinburgh 1920, took 4th at Utrecht 1920, tied for 1st–4th at Bussum 1921, tied for 3rd–4th at The Hague 1922, took 4th at Margate 1923, tied for 4–5th at Scheveningen 1923, and shared 1st at Groningen 1925.

Oskam represented the Netherlands in 1st unofficial Chess Olympiad at Paris 1924.

== Personal life ==
Oskam was a lawyer by profession. He obtained his Master of Laws at the University of Amsterdam in 1906 and subsequently had a practice in Rotterdam. In April 1910 he married Sara van Laar from Amsterdam.
