= Johannes Metger =

German chess player

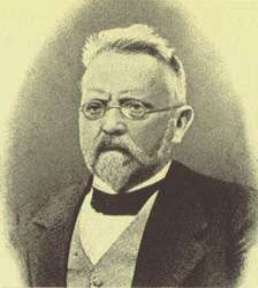
Johannes Metger.

Johannes Metger (15 December 1850, in Groothusen – 24 January 1926, in Kiel) was a German chess master.

== Chess career ==
He tied for 2nd-4th at Cologne 1877 (the 11th WDSB-Congress, Johannes Zukertort won), took 9th at Leipzig 1877 (the 3rd MDSB-Congress, Louis Paulsen won), took 7th at Frankfurt 1878 (the 12th WDSB-Congress, Paulsen won), and won in local tournaments at Schwerin 1883, Rostock 1884, and Wismer 1886.

He tied for 14-16th at Frankfurt 1887 (the 5th DSB Congress, George Henry Mackenzie won), took 6th at Nuremberg 1888 (Siegbert Tarrasch won), took 12th at Breslau 1889 (the 6th DSB-Congress, Tarrasch won), tied for 4-6th at Kiel 1893 (the 8th DSB-Congress, Curt von Bardeleben and Carl August Walbrodt won), took 12th at Berlin 1897 (Rudolf Charousek won), won at Altona 1897 (Quadrangular), took 3rd at Kiel 1900 (Quadrangular), shared 1st at Kiel 1901 (Quadrangular), and tied for 23-24th at Ostend 1907 (Ossip Bernstein and Akiba Rubinstein won).

His name is attached to the Metger Variation in the Four Knights Game (C47): 1.e4 e5 2.Nf3 Nc6 3.Nc3 Nf6 4.Bb5 Bb4 5.0-0 0-0 6.d3 d6 7.Bg5 Bxc3 8.bxc3 Qe7 9.Re1 Nd8 (with the idea of playing this Knight to e6)

He is an author of Die Schachschule (Leipzig 1886), and Der achte Kongress des Deutschen Schachbundes (Leipzig 1894).

He directed in 1925 the Baden-Baden tournament (won by Alexander Alekhine).
