= Heinrich Wagner =

German chess player (1888–1959)

Heinrich Wagner (9 August 1888, Hamburg – 24 June 1959, Hamburg) was a German chess master.

In 1920/21, he won in Kiel. In 1921, he took 8th in Hamburg (the 21st DSB Congress, Erhardt Post won), and won in Hamburg (Quadrangular). In 1922 he tied for 3rd-5th in Oeynhausen (the 22nd DSB–Congress, Post won). In 1923 he tied for 2nd-3rd in Frankfurt (the 23rd DSB–Congress, Ernst Grünfeld won). In 1924, he won ahead of Albert Becker and Carl Carls, in Bremen. In 1925 he tied for 3rd-4th in Breslau (the 24th DSB–Congress, Efim Bogoljubow won).

He shared with Karl Gilg 1st place at Vienna 1926 (DSV Kongress), tied for 3rd-4th at Bremen 1927, won at Hamburg 1928 (Quadrangular), took 2nd behind Herbert Heinicke at Hamburg 1929, shared 4th at Duisburg (the 26th DSB Congress, Carl Ahues), and tied for 6-7th in Swinemünde (Friedrich Sämisch won). In 1932, he took 4th in Hamburg (Kurt Richter won).

He lost a match to Albert Becker (3 : 5) at Hamburg 1924, and won against Herbert Heinicke (8.5 : 3.5) at Hamburg 1930.

Wagner played for Germany in Chess Olympiads.

- In 1927, at fourth board in 1st Chess Olympiad in London (+4 –3 =8);
- In 1928, at first board in 2nd Chess Olympiad in The Hague (+3 –0 =13);
- In 1930, at first reserve board in 3rd Chess Olympiad in Hamburg (+8 –1 =5);
- In 1931, at third board in 4th Chess Olympiad in Prague (+4 –1 =9).

He won team bronze medal at Hamburg 1930.

Wagner was awarded the International Master title in 1953.
