= Augustin Neumann =

Austrian chess player (1879–1906)

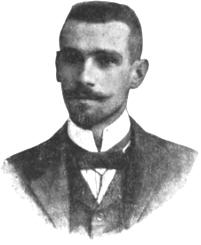
Augustin Neumann

Augustin Neumann (23 May 1879 – 2 February 1906) was an Austrian chess master.

He tied for 3rd-5th at Vienna 1901/02 (Julius Perlis won); took 2nd, behind Leopold Loewy Jr at Vienna 1902 (Quadrangular); took 3rd at Hannover 1902 (13th DSB–Congress, Hauptturnier, Walter John won); took 5th at Hilversum 1903 (Paul Leonhardt won); tied for 4-5th at Vienna 1904 (Carl Schlechter won).

Augustin Neumann won at Coburg 1904, after a playoff against Milan Vidmar (14th DSB–Congress, Hauptturnier A), which earned him the master title of the German Chess Federation. Neumann tied for 4-6th at Barmen 1905 (B tourn, Leo Fleischmann won); and tied for 7-9th at Vienna 1905 (Schlechter won).

He died in a hospital, at the age of 26.
