= Teodor Regedziński =

Polish chess player (1894–1954)

Teodor (Theodor, Theodore) Regedziński (Regedzinski, Reger) (28 April 1894 – 2 August 1954) was a Polish chess master of German origin.

== Biography ==
Born Poland (near Łódź), Regedziński was of German origin as his father, named Reger. He had lived in Łódź since 1908, enrolling in the Łódź Association of Devotees of the Game of Chess. In 1912, he took 2nd, behind Gersz Salwe, in an unofficial city championship. During World War I, he was temporarily detained by the Austrians but was released in 1916. In 1917 he took 3rd in the club championship. In 1918 and 1919 he finished first.

He participated in all four pre-war editions of the Polish Chess Championship. In 1926, he tied for 3rd–7th, behind Dawid Przepiórka, and Paulin Frydman, at Warsaw (1st POL–ch). In 1927, he took 4th, behind Rubinstein, Ksawery Tartakower, and Kazimierz Makarczyk, at Łódź (2nd POL–ch). In 1927, he won at Kecskemét. In 1930, Regedzinski lost a match against Makarczyk (+2 –3 =3) at Łódź. In 1930, he tied for 2nd–3rd, with Jakub Kolski, behind Izaak Appel, at Łódź. In 1930, he took 8th at Štubnianské Teplice. The event was won by Andor Lilienthal, though Regedzinski defeated him in their individual game. In 1933, he won a Polish pre-Olympic tournament. In 1935, he tied for 8th–9th at Łódź. In 1935, he tied for 10th–11th in the 3rd Polish Championship at Warsaw. In 1937, he tied for 7th–8th in the 4th Polish Championship, which was an open tournament, at Jurata. The event was won by Tartakower, ahead of Gideon Ståhlberg, and Mieczysław Najdorf. In 1938, he took 13th at Łódź. In 1939, he won a Pomeranian championship.

Regedziński was a member of Polish team at four Chess Olympiads (1928, 1933, 1937, 1939) and at 3rd unofficial Chess Olympiad at Munich 1936. At the 2nd Chess Olympiad in The Hague 1928, he scored 10/13 (+8 –1 =4) receiving the third prize for the best individual result (no board order was known those days). In 1933, he played at third board (+2 –1 =4) at 5th Chess Olympiad in Folkestone. At the unofficial Olympiad in Munich 1936, where Polish team took the silver medal, he played at third board (+9 –2 =7). In 1937, he reached his all-time peak scoring 11/13 (+10 –1 =2) to win second prize for best result at reserve board and third best overall result at the 7th Chess Olympiad in Stockholm. In 1939, he played at fourth board, winning the individual bronze medal (+6 –3 =4) at the 8th Chess Olympiad in Buenos Aires.

During World War II, he had played – as Theodore Reger – in a number of tournaments, including the 7th German Chess Championship at Bad Oeynhausen 1940, where he finished 10th. In October 1941, he took 6th at the 2nd General Government chess tournament in Kraków/Warsaw (Alexander Alekhine and Paul Felix Schmidt won). Because of his linguistic skills (he spoke Polish, German, Russian, English, and French), he was appointed by the German Army as an interpreter.

After the end of World War II, he returned to Łódź, was arrested by the newly appointed communist authorities and sentenced for collaboration with the fascist regime to serve four years in a labor camp. Years spent in prison broke his health and his life. In the late 1940s, he became active once again, though he devoted most of his time spent on chess for work as a chess activist. In 1952 he won the championship of Łódź once again and took 5th in the 10th Polish Championship at Katowice.

== Notable chess games ==
- Teodor Regedziński vs Akiba Rubinstein, Łódź 1917, Ruy Lopez, Open, Tarrasch Defense, C80, 1–0
- Teodor Regedziński vs Samuel Factor (USA), The Hague 1928, 2nd Olympiad, English Opening, A13, 1–0
- Teodor Regedziński vs Andor Lilienthal, Štubnianske Teplice 1930, English, Symmetrical, Double Fianchetto, A30, 1–0
- Teodor Regedziński vs Emil Zinner (CSR), Munich (ol) 1936, Queen's Gambit Accepted, Classical Main Line, D28, 1–0
- Teodor Regedziński vs Inge Jonsson (SWE), Stockholm 1937, 7th Olympiad, Queen's Gambit Declined, Slav Defense, D17, 1–0 Unique surge of White pawns attacking Black Kingside.
- Teodor Regedziński vs Isaias Pleci (ARG), Buenos Aires 1939, 8th Olympiad, Queen's Gambit Declined, Exchange Variation, D36, 1–0
- Teodor Regedziński vs Josef Lokvenc, Krakow/Warsaw 1941, 2nd GG–ch, Caro-Kann, Panov Attack, B14, 1–0
