= Samuel Factor (chess player) =

Polish-American chess player

Personal information
- Born: Samuel Faktor; September 22, 1892 Łódź, Poland
- Died: January 11, 1949 (aged 56) Chicago, Illinois, United States

Chess career
- Country: Poland (before 1921); United States (after 1921)

Samuel ("S. D.") Factor (Faktor) (22 September 1892, Łódź – 11 January 1949, Chicago) was a Polish-American chess master.

== Biography ==
During World War I, Faktor was one of the strongest chess players in Łódź . In 1916, he lost a match to Hirszbajn (+2 –4 =4). In 1917, he took 3rd, behind Gersz Salwe, and Teodor Regedziński. In 1917/18, he took 2nd, behind Regedziński. In 1919, he won the Łódź Chess Club Championship. Then, he emigrated, via Holland, to America.

In the end of 1919, he drew a mini-match with Richard Réti (+1 –1 =0) in Rotterdam. In March 1920, he tied for 2nd-3rd with Abraham Speijer, behind Akiba Rubinstein, in Rotterdam. In July 1921, Factor tied for 5-7th in Atlantic City (8th American Chess Congress). The event was won by Dawid Janowski. In October 1921, he took 2nd, behind Edward Lasker, in Cleveland, Ohio (22nd WCA). In August/September 1922, he won in Louisville, Kentucky (23rd WCA). In 1922, Factor won the Championship of Chicago.

In 1928, Factor represented USA at third board (+4 –2 =5) in the 2nd Chess Olympiad in The Hague. He won team silver medal.

In August 1932, he tied for 7–10th in Pasadena, California (Alexander Alekhine won).

According to his obituary in the January 20, 1949 issue of Chess Life, Factor died after a brief illness. The article highlights that Factor won the Western Chess Association Championship twice—at Louisville in 1922 and at Chicago in 1930 (tied with N. T. Whitaker in the later). The obituary further notes:

As an organizer of chess Factor was prominent. He had a hand in the development of the original Western Chess Association; he was one of the organizers of the National Chess Federation, and later of the American Chess Federation; and lived to see these three begin to realize his dreams in the final form of the United States Chess Federation of which he was a most valued Director.

It is difficult to be objective in cataloguing a few of Sam Factor's many contributions to chess, for in many respects his own personality was his greatest contribution. Few master players have won as modestly, lost as graciously, or been as unostentatiously helpful and unselfish with their time and talent.

Factor was survived by his wife Hazel and his children Barbara and Phyllis.

Samuel Factor was a nephew of Max Factor in that Samuel Factor's father Daniel was a brother of Max.

== Notable chess games ==
- Samuel Faktor vs Richard Réti, Rotterdam 1919, Dutch Defence, A85, 1-0
- Samuel Factor vs Samuel Reshevsky, Detroit 1924, 25th WCA, Queen’s Gambit Declined, Semi-Slav, D46, 1-0
- Samuel Factor vs Karl Gilg (CSR), The Hague 1928, 2nd Olympiad, Queen's Gambit Declined, Orthodox Defense, Classical, D68, 1-0
- Nietsche vs Samuel Factor, Chicago 1942, King's Gambit Accepted, Bishop's Gambit, Lopez Variation, C33, 0-1
