= Johannes van den Bosch (chess player) =

Dutch chess player (1906–1994)

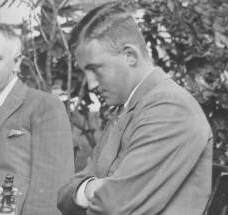

Personal information
- Born: 12 April 1906 The Hague, Netherlands
- Died: 15 November 1994 (aged 88) Hilversum, Netherlands

Chess career
- Country: Netherlands

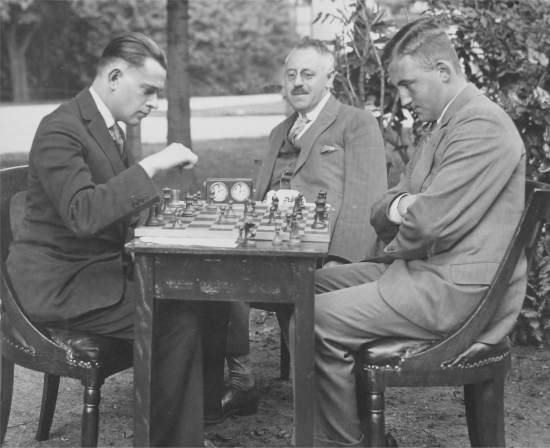
Van den Bosch (right) vs. Salo Landau, c. 1930.

Johannes Hendrik Otto van den Bosch, Count van den Bosch (12 April 1906, The Hague – 15 November 1994, Hilversum) was a Dutch noble, lawyer, banker and chess master. He thrice represented The Netherlands in Chess Olympiads, including the 2nd Chess Olympiad at The Hague in 1928, the 3rd Chess Olympiad at Hamburg in 1930, and the 4th Chess Olympiad at Prague in 1931.

== Personal life ==
Count Van den Bosch was the son of Jeanne Françoise Marie Rijnen and Johannes Hendrik Otto van den Bosch (1869-1940), vice-admiral in the Dutch navy from 1925 to 1939. His great-grandfather was Johannes van den Bosch, Governor-General of the Dutch East Indies from (1830–33), who was created count in 1839. Johannes Hendrik Otto studied law at the University of Utrecht and eventually became a director of De Nederlandsche Bank. He married Benudina Maria Royaards in 1937.

== Chess ==
His best achievements were two winnings in The Hague (1928, 1929), joint second place, behind Mir Sultan Khan, at Cambridge 1932, the second place in Dutch Chess Championship at The Hague/Leiden 1933, and winning at Amsterdam 1936. He also took 3rd at Amsterdam 1938 (NED-ch), 3rd at Delft 1940 (Quadrangular), 4th at Baarn 1941, and 9th at Amsterdam 1954 (NED-ch).

He played in several matches: won against Rudolf Loman (4-2) at The Hague 1927, lost to Willem Fick (1-3) at The Hague 1930, lost to George Salto Fontein (2-3) at The Hague 1930, lost to Salo Flohr (2-6) at The Hague 1932, drew with Rudolf Spielmann (2-2) at Amsterdam 1934, lost to Max Euwe (0-6) at Amsterdam 1934, drew with Salo Landau (5-5) at Amsterdam 1934, and drew with Henny van Oosterom (3-3) at Hilversum 1961/62.

He also participated in friendly matches: The Netherlands – England in 1939, The Netherlands – England in 1947, The Netherlands – England in 1949.

Dutch nobility
Preceded by Johannes Hendrik Otto van den Bosch	Count van den Bosch; 1940–1994	Succeeded by Johannes Hendrik Otto van den Bosch
