= Max Harmonist =

German chess player

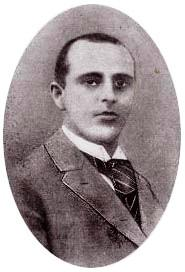
Max Harmonist

Max Harmonist (Berlin, 10 February 1864 – 16 October 1907) was a leading German chess master. He was probably the only famous chess player to have been by profession a ballet dancer. He often performed in the royal ballet.

He became famous after winning a game at Frankfurt 1887 against Isidor Gunsberg, widely regarded as one of the strongest masters of that period. In the same tournament he also beat Joseph Blackburne (who placed 2nd) and Emil Schallopp.

In tournaments, he was 1st–4th at Berlin 1883, took 3rd at Berlin 1885, won at Hamburg 1885 (Hauptturnier), won at Berlin 1887, took 21st at Frankfurt 1887, tied for 4–5th at Berlin 1888, tied for 4–5th at Nuremberg 1888, tied for 15–16th at Breslau 1889, and tied for 5–8th at Berlin 1890.
