= Hermann von Hanneken (chess player) =

German chess player

Bernhard August Karl Hermann von Hanneken (2 February 1810 – 6 September 1886) was a German chess player.

He was a Prussian general who analysed in Schachzeitung in 1850 the line 1.e4 e5 2.f4 exf4 3.Lc4 Sf6 (the Cozio Defence to the King's Gambit).

He lost a match to Augustus Mongredien (+1 –3 =2) at Berlin 1845, tied for 3rd-5th at Düsseldorf 1862 (the 2nd WDSB Congress, Max Lange won), and took 4th at Wiesbaden 1871 (Carl Göring won).
