= Robert Henry Barnes =

British-German chess player (1849–1916)

Robert Henry Barnes (2 October 1849 – January 1916) was a British–German chess player.

He played in Germany, at Frankfurt 1884 (4th scoring 7.5/11); at Frankfurt 1887 (5th DSB Congress, Hauptturnier A, 1st scoring 8/9, and Siegergruppe, 5-6th scoring 1/5); at Leipzig 1894 (9th DSB Congress, Hauptturnier A, 1st scoring 5/5, and Siegergruppe, 3rd-5th scoring 4/7); and won at Eisenach (10th DSB Congress) scoring 10.5/14.

He was an English teacher in Frankfurt and for many years the chairman of the Frankfurt Chess Club. He died in Bad Nauheim in January 1916.
