= Alexander Evenson =

Russian chess master (1892–1919)

Alexandr Moyseyevich Evensohn (Evenson, Evensson) (1892–1919) was a Russian chess master.

== Biography ==
In 1909, Evensohn took 7th at Kyiv. The event was won by Nikolaev. In 1911, he took 3rd, behind Efim Bogoljubow and Izbinsky, at Kyiv. In 1911, he took 4th at Kyiv. The event was won by Fedor Bohatirchuk. In 1913, he won, followed by Andrey Smorodsky, Boris Verlinsky, et al., at St Petersburg. In January 1914, he took 9th at St. Petersburg in the Russian Championship; the event was won by Alexander Alekhine and Aron Nimzowitsch. In 1914, he won, ahead of Bogoljubow and Bohatirchuk, at Kyiv.

During World War I, in 1916, Evensohn lost a mini-match against Alekhine at Kyiv (+1 –2 =0). Also in 1918, he lost against Alekhine at Kyiv.

Evensohn was a lawyer by training and served on a military tribunal for the Red Army. During the Russian Civil War, he was shot by the White Army of Denikin.

== Notable chess games ==
- Andrey Smorodsky vs Alexander Evensohn, St Petersburg 1914, Queen's Pawn Game, D04, 0-1
