= Izaak Appel =

Polish chess player (1905–1941)

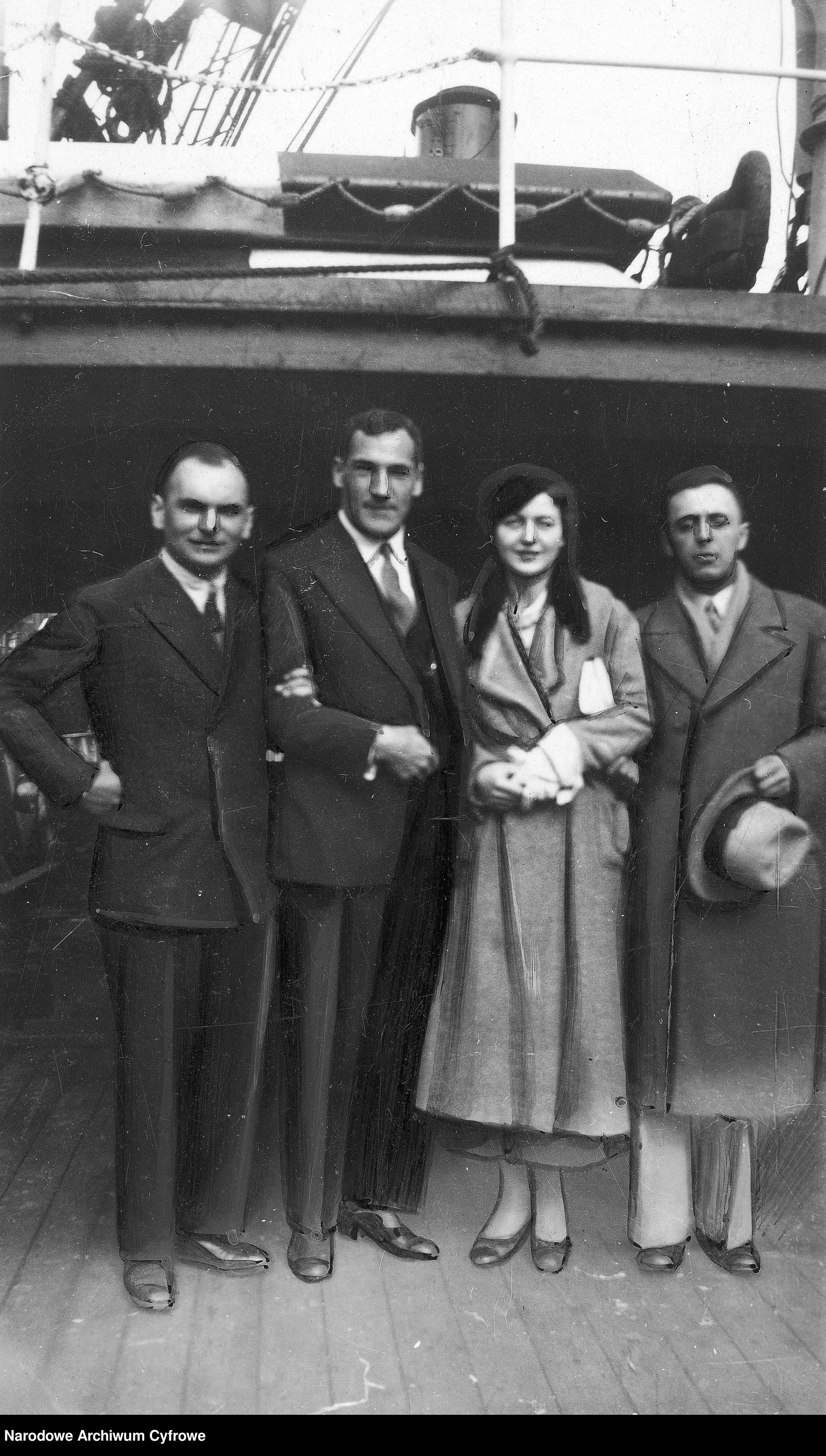
- Chess players Kazimierz Makarczyk, Teodor Regedziński and Izaak Appel (right) on their way to the 5th Chess Olympiad
- Born: 1905
- Disappeared: After 22 June 1941; Kiev, Soviet Union
- Status: Missing for 85 years, 3 months and 7 days
- Occupation: Chess master

Izaak (Isaak) Appel (1905–1941) was a Jewish-Polish chess master.

== Biography ==
In 1926, he took 12th place in the Warsaw (1st POL-ch) competition, which was won by Dawid Przepiórka. In 1929, he took 2nd place, behind Teodor Regedziński, in the Championship of Łódź. In 1930, he took 6th place in Zoppot (Sopot), the event won by Paulin Frydman. In 1930–1934 and 1937, Appel won six times the Łódź championships. He represented Łódź at the Polish Team championships (1st place at Królewska Huta (Königshütte) 1929, and 2nd place at Katowice 1934). The Łódź team won two silver medals.

In 1932, he won matches against P. Frydman and O. Karlin. In 1935, he tied for 8th place in Łódź, which Tartakower won. In 1935, he won in Łódź. In 1935, he tied for 10th place in the Warsaw (3rd POL-ch) competition. The event was won by Savielly Tartakower. In 1937, he tied for 4th place with Endre Steiner and Vasja Pirc, behind Tartakower, Ståhlberg, and Najdorf in the Jurata (4th POL-ch) competition. In 1938, he tied for 8th place in the Łódź competition, which Pirc won.

In 1933 and 1935, he took 2nd in the pre-Olympic tournaments. Appel represented Poland in two Chess Olympiads. He played at fourth board (+4 -2 = 4) at Folkestone 1933. He played at fourth board (+7 -3 =4) at Stockholm 1937, where he won team bronze medal.

Just prior to World War II, Appel lived in Lviv, where he played in some Ukrainian tournaments. In 1940, he took 11th place in the Kiev, Soviet Union (12th UKR-ch) competition. The event was won by Isaac Boleslavsky. Appel disappeared and is presumed to have died during the Holocaust, but the precise date and circumstances of his death are unknown.

== See also ==
- List of Jewish chess players
- List of people who disappeared
