= Ferenc Chalupetzky =

Hungarian chess player and author

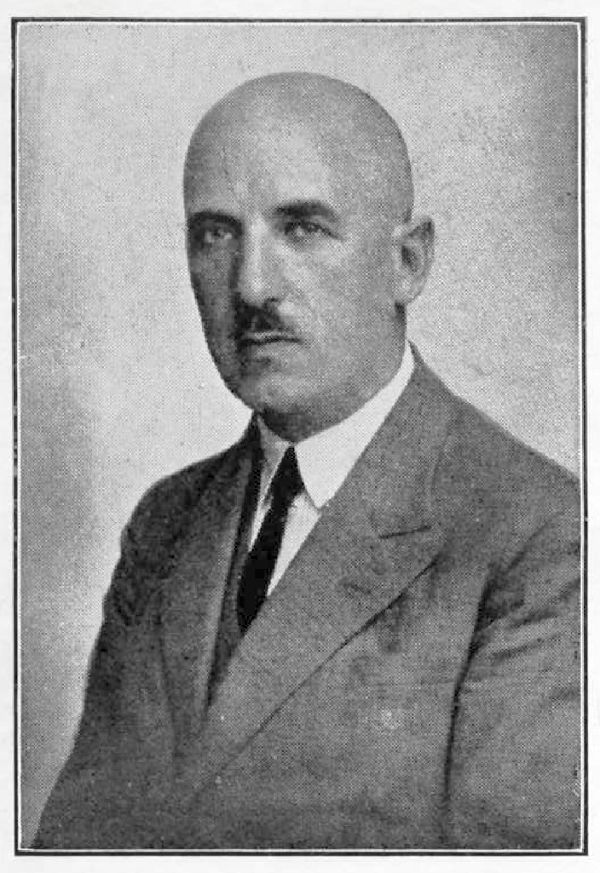

Ferenc Chalupetzky (6 April 1886, Magyaróvár – 19 August 1951, Győr) was a Hungarian chess master and author.

He took 2nd at Győr 1905, shared 1st at Győr 1906, tied for 1st-3rd at Győr 1908, shared 2nd with István Abonyi, behind Karel Treybal, in the Prague 1908 chess tournament (the Main Tournament), took 2nd at Győr 1911 (Zoltán von Balla won), and tied for 6-8th at Budapest 1911 (the 3rd Hungarian Chess Championship, Z. von Balla and Zsigmond Barász won). After World War I, he tied for 6-7th at Gyula 1923, tied for 4-5th at Budapest 1924, twice shared 1st at Győr 1925, and shared 1st with Ernő Gereben at Kórmend 1926.

He was also a correspondence chess player who won the 1911 Wiener Schachzeitung correspondence tournament. He was a member of Internationaler Fernschachbund (IFSB) and International Correspondence Chess Federation (ICCF).

Chalupetzky wrote several chess books (i.e. Das große Fernturnier des Internationalen Fernschachbundes (IFSB) um die Bundesmeisterschaft 1932, 1935; Lieder ohne Worte. Sammlung erstklassiger Schachpartien aus dem Jahre 1937-1942. I.- VI. Folge. Zusammengestellt v. F. Chalupetzky u. L. Tóth. Magyar Sakkvilág, Kecskemét 1937-1942; Capablanca. Sakkozói pályafutása és játszmái 1888-1942. Összeállitták Chalupetzky Ferenc és Tóth László. Magyar Sakkvilág, Kecskemet 1943).
