= Rudolf Charousek =

Hungarian chess player (1873–1900)

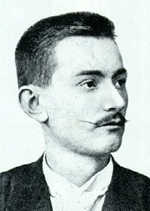

Personal information
- Born: 19 September 1873 Lomeček, Bohemia, Austria-Hungary
- Died: 18 April 1900 (aged 26) Budapest, Hungary, Austria-Hungary

Chess career
- Country: Hungary

Rudolf Charousek (Hungarian: Charousek Rezső; 19 September 1873 – 18 April 1900) was a Czech-born Hungarian chess player. One of the top ten players in the world during the 1890s, he had a short career, dying at the age of 26 from tuberculosis. Reuben Fine wrote of him "Playing over his early games is like reading Keats's poetry: you cannot help feeling a grievous, oppressive sense of loss, of promise unfulfilled".

== Life ==
Charousek was born in Lomeček, Bohemia, Austria-Hungary (today part of Úmonín near Prague, Czech Republic). At the age of five weeks, his family moved to Debrecen, Hungary, where he became a naturalized Hungarian. They later moved to Miskolc where, at the age of 16, he learned to play chess. Studying law in Kassa (today Košice, Slovakia), he is said to have copied out the voluminous Handbuch des Schachspiels by hand, unable to afford his own copy. Despite the lack of competition in Kassa, he soon became a strong player, and also qualified as a lawyer. In 1893 he entered a correspondence tournament organised by the Budapest newspaper Pesti Hírlap, in which he eventually shared first place with another up and coming Hungarian master, Géza Maróczy. He joined the Budapest chess club, where he frequently played with Maróczy and Gyula Makovetz, and convincingly defeated Győző Exner in a match.

== Notable games ==
This is Charousek's last round win over the World Champion in his international tournament debut:

Charousek—Lasker, Nuremberg 1896

King's Gambit 1.e4 e5 2.f4 exf4 3.Bc4 d5 4.Bxd5 Qh4+ 5.Kf1 g5 6.Nf3 Qh5 7.h4 Bg7 8.Nc3 c6 9.Bc4 Bg4 10.d4 Nd7 11.Kf2 Bxf3 12.gxf3 O-O-O 13.hxg5 Qxg5 14.Ne2 Qe7 15.c3 Ne5 16.Qa4 Nxc4 17.Qxc4 Nf6 18.Bxf4 Nd7 19.Qa4 a6 20.Qa5 Nf8 21.Ng3 Ne6 22.Nf5 Qf8 23.Bg3 Rd7 24.Nxg7 Qxg7 25.Qe5 Qxe5 26.Bxe5 f6 27.Bxf6 Rf8 28.Rh6 Nf4 29.Ke3 Ng2+ 30.Kd2 Rdf7 31.e5 Nf4 32.Rah1 Rg8 33.c4 Ne6 34.Ke3 Nf8 35.d5 Rd7 36.e6 1-0

Charousek - Wollner

Position: a8 black rook, f8 black king, a7 black pawn, b7 black pawn, c7 black pawn, d7 black bishop, f7 white pawn, g7 black pawn, c6 black knight, d6 black pawn, h6 black pawn, c5 black bishop, c4 white bishop, f4 white bishop, g4 black knight, h4 black queen, c3 white knight, a2 white pawn, b2 white pawn, e2 white queen, g2 white pawn, h2 white pawn, e1 white rook, f1 white rook, h1 white king

Position after 16. ...Nc6

Another of Charousek's games, which Grandmaster Andrew Soltis described as "one of the prettiest ever", was the basis for the story Last Round by Kester Svendsen, which Soltis called "perhaps the finest chess short story". Here is the game with punctuation marks by Soltis:

Charousek—Wollner, Kaschau 1893

Danish Gambit 1.e4 e5 2.d4 exd4 3.c3 dxc3 4.Bc4 Nf6 5.Nf3 Bc5 6.Nxc3 d6 7.O-O O-O 8.Ng5 h6 9.Nxf7! Rxf7 10.e5 Ng4!? 11.e6 Qh4! 12.exf7+ Kf8 13.Bf4 Nxf2 14.Qe2 Ng4+ 15.Kh1 Bd7 16.Rae1 Nc6 (diagram) 17.Qe8+!! Rxe8 18.fxe8(Q)+ Bxe8 19.Bxd6 mate.

A variation of the Queen's Gambit Declined is named after him.
