= Friedrich Köhnlein =

German chess player

Friedrich Köhnlein (Koehnlein) (12 December 1879 – 5 July 1916) was a German chess master and problemist.

He won at Düsseldorf 1908 (the 16th DSB Congress, Hauptturnier A). He also took 2nd at Munich 1904 (Quadrangular, Rudolf Spielmann won), took 5th at Nuremberg 1906 (the 15th DSB Congress, Hauptturnier A, won by Savielly Tartakower), won at Munich 1907, and tied for 11-14th at Hamburg 1910 (the 17th DSB Congress, Carl Schlechter won).

He died during World War I in the Battle of Somme.
