= Max Marchand =

Dutch chess player

Max Marchand (1915)

Max Marchand (24 November 1888, Amsterdam – 1957, Baarn) was a Dutch chess master.

During World War I, he played only in the neutral Netherlands and Denmark. In 1915, he took second in Amsterdam, won in Scheveningen, and took second in Rotterdam. In 1916, he tied for second-fourth, behind Paul Johner, in Copenhagen (the ninth Nordic Chess Championship), and won in Amsterdam. In 1917, he took third in Scheveningen. In 1918, he won in Amsterdam, shared first in Arnheim, took third in 's Hertogenbosch, and tied for fifth-sixth in Scheveningen (Rudolf Loman won).

After the war, he won the fourth Dutch Chess Championship at The Hague 1919. In that year, he also shared 1st with Richard Réti in Amsterdam, took ninth in Hastings (José Raúl Capablanca won), tied for third-fourth in Scheveningen, won in Amsterdam, and tied for second-third in Amsterdam. In 1920, he won and tied for second-third, behind George Alan Thomas, in Bromley, took fifth (Réti won) and fourth in Amsterdam (Quadrangular, Max Euwe won), took fourth in Göteborg (P. Johner won), and took fourth in Scheveningen. His last appearance at the top level was on board 5 in the match Germany v. Netherlands, 1922, where he lost both games against Carl Ahues.
