= Semyon Alapin =

Russian chess player (1856–1923)

Semyon Zinovyevich Alapin
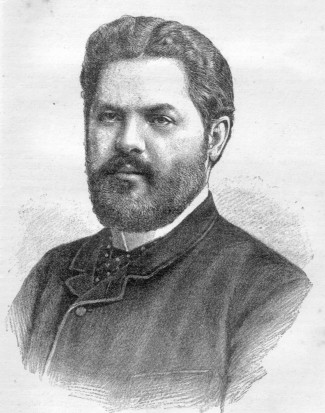
- Drawing of Alapin
- Born: November 19, 1856; Saint Petersburg, Russian Empire
- Died: July 15, 1923 (aged 66); Heidelberg, Republic of Baden, Germany
- Occupations: Railway engineer; Grain commodities merchant
- Known for: Chess openings analysis

Semyon Zinovyevich Alapin (Russian: Семён Зиновьевич Алапин, sometimes given as Simon and/or Alapine; 19 November [O.S. 7 November] 1856 – 15 July 1923) was a Russian chess player, openings analyst, and puzzle composer. He was also a linguist, railway engineer and a grain commodities merchant.

== Biography ==
Born in Saint Petersburg, Russia, into a Jewish family on 19 November [O.S. 7 November] 1856, nephew of the Jewish memoirist Pauline Wengeroff. He was one of the strongest chess players in the Russian Empire in the late 19th century. Due to the 1917 Revolution in Russia, he had to spend his final years in exile. He died in Heidelberg, Germany, on 15 July 1923.

== Legacy ==
Today he is best known for his creation of opening systems in almost all major openings. Most of these are of little significance today, but Alapin's Variation of the Sicilian Defence is an important opening line that is often played by leading grandmasters.

=== Openings named after Alapin ===
- Alapin's Variation of the Sicilian Defence: 1.e4 c5 2.c3
- Alapin's Opening in the Open Game: 1.e4 e5 2.Ne2!?
- Alapin's Gambit of the French Defence: 1.e4 e6 2.d4 d5 3.Be3!?
- Alapin's Variation of the French Defence: 1.e4 e6 2.d4 d5 3.Nc3 Nf6 4.Bg5 Be7 5.e5 Nfd7 6.Bxe7 Qxe7 7.Nb5
- Alapin's Defence of the Ruy Lopez: 1.e4 e5 2.Nf3 Nc6 3.Bb5 Bb4
- Alapin's Variation of the Caro–Kann Defence: 1.e4 c6 2.c3
- Alapin's Variation of the Dutch Defence (also known as the Manhattan Variation): 1.d4 f5 2.Qd3
- Alapin's Variation of the Queen's Gambit: 1.d4 d5 2.c4 e6 3.Nc3 b6
- Alapin–Steinitz Variation of the Evans Gambit: 1.e4 e5 2.Nf3 Nc6 3.Bc4 Bc5 4.b4 Bxb4 5.c3 Ba5 6.0-0 d6 7.d4 Bg4
- Sanders–Alapin Variation of the Evans Gambit: 1.e4 e5 2.Nf3 Nc6 3.Bc4 Bc5 4.b4 Bxb4 5.c3 Ba5 6.0-0 d6 7.d4 Bd7

== See also ==
- List of Russian chess players
