= Paul Saladin Leonhardt =

German chess player

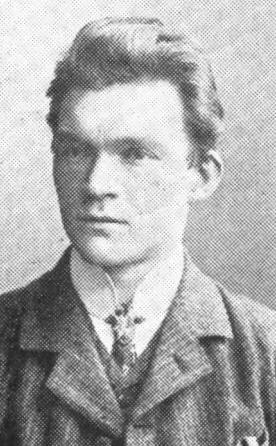
- Leonhardt, before 1905

Personal information
- Born: Paul Saladin Leonhardt; 13 November 1877 Posen, Province of Posen, German Empire (now Poland)
- Died: 14 December 1934 (aged 57) Königsberg, Germany

Chess career
- Country: Germany

Paul Saladin Leonhardt (13 November 1877 – 14 December 1934) was a German chess master. He was born in Posen, Province of Posen, German Empire (now Poland), and died of a heart attack in Königsberg during a game of chess.

A player with a low profile and not many tournament wins, Leonhardt has been largely forgotten by the history books. However, at his best, he was able to defeat most of the elite players of the period. Tarrasch, Tartakower, Nimzowitsch, Maróczy and Réti all succumbed to his fierce attacking style between 1903 and 1920. He won several brilliancy prizes.

== Tournaments ==
In major tournaments he was first at Hilversum 1903, Hamburg 1905, and Copenhagen 1907 (ahead of Maróczy and Schlechter), making him Nordic Champion; third, behind Rubinstein and Maróczy, at Carlsbad 1907; second, behind Milan Vidmar, at Gothenburg 1909 (7th Nordic-ch); second, behind Rudolf Spielmann, at Stockholm 1909; and second, behind Carl Ahues, at Duisburg (DSB Congress) 1929.

== Matches ==
In matches he drew with Rudolf Loman (+4−4=2), won against James Mortimer (+5−0=3), defeated Samuel Passmore (6:2), and drew with Georg Schories (2:2) at London 1904; defeated Hector William Shoosmith (+5−0=1), and lost to Jacques Mieses (+1−5=1) at London 1905; lost to Spielmann (+4−6=5) at Munich 1906; lost to Frank Marshall (+1–2=4), defeated Nimzowitsch (+4–0=1), and lost to Hugo Süchting (1½:2½) at Hamburg 1911, and drew with him (2:2) at Hamburg 1912; won against Moishe Lowtzky (+5−1=1) at Leipzig 1913; drew with Hans Fahrni (1:1), and won against Jenő Székely (2½:1½) at Munich 1914; and drew with Curt von Bardeleben (2:2) at Berlin 1921.

== Legacy ==
As an expert analyst of the openings, he wrote a monograph on the Ruy Lopez (Zur Spanischen Partie – 1913). Opening variations have been attributed to him in the Lopez, Sicilian Defence, Ponziani Opening, Evans Gambit, Latvian Gambit, and the Scandinavian Defense.
