= Julius Perlis =

Austrian chess player (1880–1913)

Dr. Julius Perlis
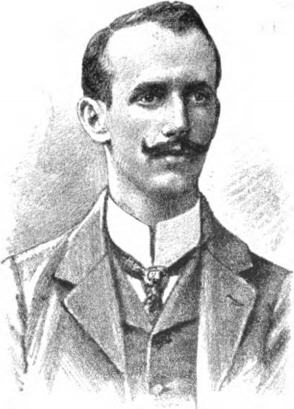

Personal information
- Born: January 19, 1880 Białystok, Poland, then Russian Empire
- Died: September 11, 1913 (aged 33) Ennstal Alps, Austria

Chess career
- Title: Grand Master
- Years active: 1901—1913
- Peak ranking: 17 (1909)

Julius Perlis (19 January 1880, in Białystok (Poland, then Russian Empire) – 11 September 1913, in Ennstal, Austria) was an Austrian chess player.

== Biography ==
At the beginning of his career, Perlis played in Vienna, winning in 1901. Then, in 1902 he took 3rd (Quadrangular), took 2nd, behind Mikhail Chigorin in 1903, and won in 1904. The same year, he took 3rd in Vienna (Gambit tournament). The event was won by Carl Schlechter. In 1905, he tied for 4-6th in Barmen (Masters B). In 1906, he took 9th in Ostend (Schlechter won). In 1906, he took 3rd in Vienna. In 1907, he tied for 7-8th in Vienna (Jacques Mieses won). In 1907, he took 16th in Ostend (Masters B). In 1908, he tied for 7-8th in Vienna (Trebitsch tournament). In 1909, he took 7th in Sankt Petersburg. The event was won by Emanuel Lasker and Akiba Rubinstein. In 1909, he took 3rd in Vienna Richard Réti won). In 1909/10, he took 3rd in Vienna. In 1911, he took 13th in Karlsbad Karlovy Vary (Richard Teichmann won). In 1912, he took 5th in San Sebastian, Spain (Rubinstein won). In 1912, he tied for 3rd-4th in Vienna (Schlechter won). In 1913, he took 5th in Vienna (Rudolf Spielmann won).

Perlis died from exposure in a mountaineering accident in the Austrian Alps in 1913.

== Notable chess games ==
- Géza Maroczy vs Julius Perlis, Vienna 1904, Gambit tournament, King's Gambit Declined, Classical Variation, C30, 0-1
- Rudolf Spielmann vs Julius Perlis, Barmen 1905, King's Gambit Declined, Classical Variation, C30, 0-1
- Julius Perlis vs Frank James Marshall, Vienna 1908, Trebitsch tournament, French Defense, C00, 1-0
- Julius Perlis vs Eugene Znosko-Borovsky, Sankt Petersburg 1909, French Defense, C00, 1-0
- Chess games of Julius Perlis
