= Walter John =

German chess player (1879–1940)

Walter John (January 1879 – December 1940) was a German chess master.

== Biography ==
John was born at Thorn (Toruń), German Empire. He took 2nd, behind Curt von Bardeleben in Café Kerkau, and took 4th (Ossip Bernstein won) at Berlin 1902. He won at Hanover 1902 (13th DSB–Congress, B tournament). In 1904, he tied for 11-12th in Coburg (14th DSB Congress; Bardeleben, Carl Schlechter and Rudolf Swiderski won). In 1905, he tied for 7-10th in Barmen (Dawid Janowski and Géza Maróczy won). In 1907, he tied for 10-11th in Ostend (B tourn; Bernstein and Akiba Rubinstein won). In 1908, he took 4th in Düsseldorf (16th DSB–Congress, Frank Marshall won). In 1910, he took 16th in Hamburg (17th DSB–Congress, Schlechter won). In 1914, he tied for 10-11th in Mannheim (19th DSB–Congress, Alexander Alekhine won).

John drew a match with Jacques Mieses (+1 –1 =3) at Leipzig 1917. He won, jointly with Paul Johner, at Berlin 1917, won at Breslau 1918, took 5th at Gothenburg 1920 (B tournament won by P. Johner), won at Berlin 1921, and took 4th at Hamburg 1921 (21st DSB–Congress, Ehrhardt Post won).

He took 11th at Bad Aachen 1934 (the 2nd German Chess Championship, Carl Carls won).

In September 1940, he won in Danzig (Gdańsk). In December 1940, he died in Berlin.
