= Ehrhardt Post =

German chess player and functionary

Alfred M. Ehrhardt Post (23 September 1881 in Cottbus – 1 August 1947 in Berlin) was a German chess master and functionary.

== Biography ==
At the beginning of his career, he won and tied for 3-6th at Hanover 1902 (13th DSB–Congress, B tourn). He tied for 7-8th at Coburg 1904 (14th DSB–Congress, B tourn) and 12-13th at Barmen 1905 (B tourn, Leo Forgacs (Fleischmann) won). He took 7th at Ostend 1906 (elim.).

In 1907 he took 2nd, behind Richard Teichmann, in Berlin. In 1910 Post won a match against Wilhelm Cohn (+6 –3 =3) in Berlin. He tied for 13-14th in interrupted the Mannheim 1914 chess tournament (19th DSB–Congress, Alexander Alekhine won). In 1917, he tied for 3rd-4th in Berlin (Paul Johner and Walter John won).

Post won, ahead of Friedrich Sämisch, at Hamburg 1921 (21st DSB–Congress). He won, ahead of Carl Carls, at Oeynhausen 1922 (22nd DSB–Congress). He tied for 2nd-3rd, behind Ernst Grünfeld, at Frankfurt 1923 (23rd DSB–Congress).

In 1933–1945 Ehrhardt Post was a Managing Director (the Chief Executive ) of the Nazi Grossdeutscher Schachbund and a principal organizer of the strongest chess tournaments in Europe (Stuttgart 1939 – 1st Europa Turnier, Efim Bogoljubow won, Munich 1941 – 2nd Europa Turnier, Gösta Stoltz won, Salzburg 1942 – Six Grandmasters Tournament, Alexander Alekhine won, Munich 1942 – 1st European Championship, Alekhine won, Salzburg 1943 – Six Grandmasters Tournament, Paul Keres and Alekhine won).
