= Gersz Salwe =

Polish chess player (1862–1920)

Gersz Salwe (12 December 1862, Warsaw – 15 December 1920, Łódź), also written Salve, Polish: Henryk Jerzy Salwe, was a Polish chess master.

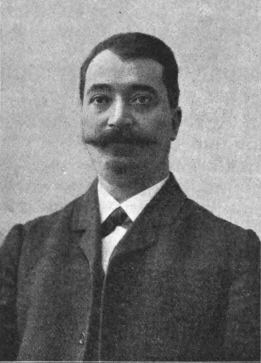
Gersz Salwe

== Biography ==
Salwe was born into a Jewish family in Warsaw (then Russian Empire). He was Szlama Zalman's son.

He gained the knowledge about chess very early but started playing chess only at about 20 years old. In 1894, he settled in Łódź at Nowocegielniana Street 10.

In 1897, Salwe took 2nd at the 1st Łódź Chess Championship. In 1898, he won a Łódź championship. In 1903, he took 4th at Kiev (All-Russian Masters' Tournament, 3rd RUS-ch, Mikhail Chigorin won). Salwe reached a peak of his career in 1906, when he won at Sankt Petersburg (All-Russian Masters' Tournament, 4th RUS-ch), ahead of Benjamin Blumenfeld and Akiba Rubinstein. In 1906, he took 4th at Łódź (Quadrangular). In 1906, he took 3rd at Łódź (Triangular). In 1906, he tied for 6-7th at Nuremberg (15th DSB Congress, Frank James Marshall won). In 1906, he played in famous 2nd tournament at Ostend, where he took 3rd (I stage), 2nd (II stage), 2nd-3rd (III stage), 4th (IV stage), and tied for 5-6th (final V stage). The event was won by Carl Schlechter.

In 1907, he took 4th at Łódź (Quadrangular). In 1907, he took 8th at Ostend. In 1907, he took 9th at Carlsbad (Rubinstein won). In 1907/08, he tied for 3rd-4th with Eugene Znosko-Borovsky, behind Rubinstein and Simon Alapin, at Łódź (All-Russian Masters' Tournament, 5th RUS-ch). In 1908, he took 13th at Vienna. In 1908, he tied for 7-9th at Prague. In 1908, he took 2nd, behind Marshall, at Düsseldorf (16th DSB Congress). In 1908, he took 3rd, behind Rubinstein and Marshall, at Łódź (Triangular). In 1908, he took 2nd, behind Alapin, at Warsaw. In 1909, he tied for 8-10th at Sankt Petersburg. The event was won by Emanuel Lasker and Rubinstein. In 1909, he took 5th at Vilna (Wilno, Vilnius). The event (All-Russian Masters' Tournament, 6th RUS-ch) was won by Rubinstein.

In 1910, he tied for 11-14th at Hamburg (17th DSB Congress, Schlechter won). In 1911, he tied for 17-18th at Carlsbad (Richard Teichmann won). In 1911, he tied for 2nd-3rd with Alexander Flamberg, behind Rubinstein, at Warsaw. In 1912, he took 3rd at Warsaw. In 1912, he tied for 9-11th at Bad Pistyan (Pieštany). In 1912, he took 10th at Vilna (All-Russian Masters' Tournament, 7th RUS-ch, Rubinstein won). In 1912, he took 3rd, behind Efim Bogoljubow and Flamberg, at Łódź. In 1913, he won at Łódź. In 1914, he won at Łódź. In 1913/14, he tied for 10-11th at Sankt Petersburg (All-Russian Masters' Tournament, 8th RUS-ch, Alexander Alekhine and Aron Nimzowitsch won). During World War I, he took 2nd in 1915, won in 1916, and took 2nd, behind Rubinstein, in 1917 at Łódź.

Salwe played several matches in Łódź. In 1903, he drew a match against Rubinstein (+5 –5 =0). In 1904, he lost to Rubinstein (+3 –5 +2). In 1904, he drew with Chigorin (+1 –1 =0). In 1905, he won a match against Jacques Mieses (+2 –1 =0). In 1906, he lost a match (RUS-ch) against Chigorin (+5 –7 =4). In 1908, he lost to Rubinstein (+1 –3 =4). In 1909, he won a match against Gersz Rotlewi (+8 –5 =3). In 1910, he lost to Rotlewi (+1 –3 =6). In 1913, he lost to Oldřich Duras (+0 –2 =2). In 1913, he lost to Bogoljubow (+3 –5 =2).

Salwe was the chief editor of the chess newspaper in Yiddish "Erste Yidishe Shahtsaytung" [First Jewish Chess Newspaper" (Łódź 1913-1914). The first issue was released in October 1913. The 1st World War caused to closing it. He later fell ill of pneumonia and died in a little chamber of the maid Anatolye Karakusenkow. She had taken care of him the last months of his life.

Salwe was buried in the Jewish Cemetery in Łódź at Bracka Street (left side, section N, tomb no. 1).

== See also ==
- List of Jewish chess players

== Bibliography ==
- Andrzej Kempa, Marek Szukalak, The Biographical Dictionary of the Jews from Lodz, Łódź 2006: Oficyna Bibliofilów, ISBN 83-87522-83-X, p. 231.

== Link ==
- Chessgames
