= Carl Carls =

German chess player (1880–1958)

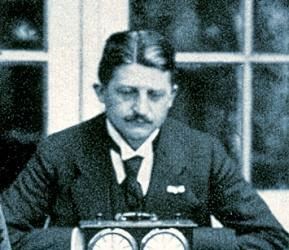

Carl Johan Margot Carls (16 September 1880, Varel – 11 September 1958, Bremen) was a German chess master.

In 1922, he took 2nd, behind Erhardt Post, in Bad Oeynhausen (22nd DSB–Congress). He won the 2nd German Championships at Bad Aachen 1934.

He took 7th at The Hague 1928 (Amateur World Championship, Max Euwe won).

Carls represented Germany in Chess Olympiads:

- 1st Chess Olympiad at London 1927 (+7 –3 =5);
- 3rd Chess Olympiad at Hamburg 1930 (+6 –1 =7);
- 3rd unofficial Chess Olympiad at Munich 1936 (+5 –2 =10).

He won two team bronze medals (1930 and 1936).

During World War II, he tied for 10-12th at Kraków – Warsaw 1941 (2nd GG-ch, Alexander Alekhine and Paul Felix Schmidt won). Carls won, ahead of Klaus Junge, at Rostock 1942. He resigned after 8 games at Prague 1943 (Alekhine won).

Carls was awarded the International Master title in 1951.

A variation of the Caro-Kann defense (1. e4 c6 2. d4 d5 3. e5 c5) is named after him.
