= 1914 in chess =

Events in chess in 1914:

== Chess events in brief ==
- St. Petersburg 1914 chess tournament – the tournament celebrated the 10th anniversary of the St. Petersburg Chess Society. President of the organizing committee was Peter Petrovich Saburov. Russian organizers intended to invite the present top twenty chess players, with world champion Emanuel Lasker and challenger José Raúl Capablanca, but strong Austro-Hungarian masters could not accept due to tensions of Russia with Austria-Hungary in the year 1914. Finally, eleven top players from Germany, France, United Kingdom, United States, Cuba, and Russian Empire were accepted. The winner was Lasker who played magnificently in the doubled rounded finals. Tsar Nicholas II of Russia, who had partially funded the tournament, awarded the Grandmaster title to the five finalists.
- Mannheim 1914 chess tournament – the 19th DSB Congress, comprising several tournaments, began on 20 July 1914 in Mannheim, Germany. On 1 August Germany declared war on Russia, and on France (3 August), Britain joining in the next day. The congress was stopped on 1 August 1914. Alexander Alekhine was leading the Meisterturnier, with nine wins, one draw and one loss, when World War I broke out. German organizers of the tournament decided that the players should be "indemnified" according to their score, but not paid the total prize money. After the declaration of war, eleven "Russian" players (Alekhine, Bogoljubov, Bogatyrchuk, Flamberg, Koppelman, Maljutin, Rabinovich, Romanovsky, Saburov, Selezniev, Weinstein) were interned in Rastatt, Germany. On 14, 17 and 29 September 1914, four of them (Alekhine, Bogatyrchuk, Saburov, and Koppelman) were freed and allowed to return home via Switzerland. A fifth player, Romanovsky was freed and went back to Petrograd in 1915, and a sixth one, Flamberg was allowed to return to Warsaw in 1916.

== Tournaments ==
- St. Petersburg (the 8th All-Russian Masters' Tournament), won by Alexander Alekhine and Aron Nimzowitsch, followed by Alexander Flamberg, Moishe Lowtzky, Grigory Levenfish, etc. December 1913 – January 1914.
- New York (Manhattan CC), won by Abraham Kupchik, January.
- St. Petersburg (Hexagonal), won by Peter Romanovsky and Sergey von Freymann.
- Kiev (Quadrangular), won by Alexander Evensohn ahead of Efim Bogoljubow and Fedor Bogatyrchuk.
- Kraków won by Flamberg ahead of Józef Dominik, March.
- St. Petersburg won by Emanuel Lasker followed by José Raúl Capablanca, Alekhine, Siegbert Tarrasch, and Frank James Marshall, 21 April – 22 May.
- Baden bei Wien (Gambit Tournament), won by Rudolf Spielmann followed by Savielly Tartakower, Carl Schlechter, Gyula Breyer, etc.
- Berlin (Quadrangular), won by Erich Cohn and Spielmann.
- Vienna (Quadrangular), won by Siegfried Reginald Wolf and Ernst Grünfeld.
- Geneva won by Alexander Ilyin-Genevsky.
- Paris (Quadrangular), won by Marshall and Alekhine, 12–14 June.
- Lyon won by Alphonse Goetz ahead of Frédéric Lazard and A. Téléguine, finished on 31 July.
- Mannheim (the 19th DSB Congress), won by Alekhine ahead of Milan Vidmar, 20 July – 1 August.
- Chester (the British Chess Championship), won by Frederick Yates and Joseph Henry Blackburne. Yates won the playoff on forfeit, finished on 21 August.
- Memphis (the 15th Western Chess Association Championship), won by Jefferson and Wolbrecht, finished 26 August.
- Baden-Baden won by Flamberg, followed by Bogoljubow, Ilya Rabinovich, etc.
- Triberg won by Bogoljubow, followed by Rabinovich, Peter Romanovsky, etc. 1914/1915.
- Vienna won by Grünfeld ahead of Kalikst Morawski, 1914/1915.
- Vienna (the 6th Trebitsch Memorial), won by Schlechter ahead of Arthur Kaufmann, 1914/15.

== Matches ==
- Alexander Alekhine drew with Aron Nimzowitsch (play-off) 1 : 1 (+1 –1 =0), St. Petersburg, January.
- Emanuel Lasker drew with Ossip Bernstein (exhibition) 1 : 1 (+1 –1 =0), Moscow, February.
- José Raúl Capablanca won against Ossip Bernstein (exhibition) 1.5 : 0.5 (+1 –0 =1), Moscow, 4–5 February.
- José Raúl Capablanca won against Savielly Tartakower (exhibition) 1.5 : 0.5 (+1 –0 =1), Vienna, 13–14 March.
- José Raúl Capablanca beat Arnold Aurbach (exhibition) 2 : 0 (+2 –0 =0), Paris, 20–24 March.
- Peter Romanovsky beat Sergey von Freymann (play-off) 2 : 0 (+2 –0 =0), St. Petersburg.
- Richard Réti defeated Walter John 2 : 1 (+1 –0 =2), Breslau.
- Paul Saladin Leonhardt drew with Hans Fahrni 1 : 1 (+1 –1 =0), Munich.
- Paul Saladin Leonhardt won against J. Szekely 2.5 : 1.5 (+2 –1 =1), Munich.
- Frederick Yates defeated George Alan Thomas 3 : 1 (+2 –0 =2), London.
- Richard Teichmann won against Frank Marshall 1.5 : 0.5 (+1 –0 =1), Berlin.
- Richard Teichmann beat Rudolf Spielmann 5 : 1 (+5 –1 =0), Leipzig.
- José Raúl Capablanca defeated Emanuel Lasker 6.5 : 3.5 (blitz, 5 seconds per move), Café Kerkau in Berlin, July 1914.

== Births ==
- 8 January – Hermann Pilnik in Stuttgart, Germany. Argentine GM.
- 21 February – Arnold Denker in New York City. American GM.
- 6 March – Theo van Scheltinga in Amsterdam. Dutch IM.
- 8 March – Oleg Neikirch in Tbilisi, Georgia. Bulgarian IM.
- 7 October – Alexander Tsvetkov in Topolovgrad, Bulgaria.
- 11 October – Reuben Fine in New York City. American GM.
- 20 October – Mona May Karff in Bessarabia. Women's US Champion.
- 26 October – Adriaan de Groot in Santpoort, the Netherlands.
- 26 December – Albert Simonson in New York City. American IM.
- 1914 – Abram Khavin in Ukraine.

== Deaths ==
- 23 April – Nicolai Jasnogrodsky, American master, died in Baltimore.
- December – Constant Ferdinand Burille, American master, died in Boston.
