= 1915 in chess =

Events in chess in 1915:

== Chess events in brief ==
- Marshall Chess Divan started by Frank Marshall. Forerunner to Marshall Chess Club.

== Tournaments ==
- Triberg chess tournament won by Efim Bogoljubow ahead of Ilya Rabinovich and Peter Romanovsky, 1914/15
- New York (Metropolitan Chess League), won by Edward Lasker, January
- Vienna (Quadrangular), won by Józef Dominik, March
- 25th London City championship (London, England), won by Sir George Thomas, March
- New York won by José Raúl Capablanca followed by Frank Marshall, Oscar Chajes and Abraham Kupchik, Jacob Bernstein and Ed Lasker, 19 April – 7 May
- 16th U.S. Open Chess Championship (Excelsior, Minnesota), won by Jackson Showalter ahead of Norman T. Whitaker, finished 21 August
- Utica won by Charles Jaffe
- Triberg won by Efim Bogoljubow ahead of Ilya Rabinovich and Alexander Flamberg
- Triberg won by Efim Bogoljubow ahead of Alexey Selezniev and Ilya Rabinovich
- Triberg won by Efim Bogoljubow of Ilya Rabinovich and Alexey Selezniev
- Moscow won by Nikolai Zubarev ahead of Peter Yurdansky
- St. Petersburg won by Alexander Ilyin-Genevsky and Golubev
- 6th Danish Chess Championship (Horsens, Denmark), won by Johannes Giersing
- Amsterdam won by G. J. van Gelder
- Rotterdam won by G. J. van Gelder
- Scheveningen won by Max Marchand
- Hastings won by Reginald Pryce Michell
- 7th Leopold Trebitsch Memorial Tournament (Vienna, Austria), won by Carl Schlechter followed by Richard Réti, Arthur Kaufmann, Georg Marco, František Schubert, and Ignatz von Popiel
- Moscow won by Alexander Alekhine ahead of Vladimir Nenarokov and Peter Yurdansky, December
- 26th London championship (London, England), won by Theodor Germann and Edward Guthlac Sergeant, 1915/16
- Triberg (Triangular), won by Efim Bogoljubow ahead of Ilya Rabinovich and Alexey Selezniev, 1915/16

== Matches ==
- 17–20 May - Addey Dixon beat H. Thomas (+3 –1 =0) in Belfast.
- c. 24 May - John O'Hanlon beat Addey Dixon (+3 –0 =0) in Portadown.
- Gyula Breyer won against Jan F. Esser (+2 –1 =1) in Budapest.
- Jacques Mieses defeated Siegbert Tarrasch (+1 –0 =1) in Berlin.
- Edward Guthlac Sergeant beat Theodor Germann (play-off) (+2 –0 =0) in London, 1915/16.

== Births ==
- 21 February - René Letelier in San Bernardo. Chilean ch. 1957, 1959, 1960, 1964, 1973, IM 1960.
- 3 March - Kazimierz Plater born in Vilna. Polish ch. 1949, 1956, 1957. IM 1950.
- 20 April - Maximilián Ujtelky born in Hungary/Slovakia. Slovak IM 1961.
- 20 May - Erik Jakob Larsson born in Landskrona, Sweden.
- 14 June - Nicolaas Cortlever, born in Amsterdam. Dutch IM 1950.
- 30 August - Hermann Albrecht, born in Marburg, Germany. IJComp 1957.
- 31 August - David Vincent Hooper, born in Reigate, England. British cr ch 1944.
- 27 November - Shlomo Smiltiner, Israeli master.
- Edward Gerstenfeld born in Lviv. Polish-Ukrainian master.
- David Polland born in USA ? U.S. Open ch 1937 and NYS ch 1937.

== Deaths ==
- Thomas Bright Wilson died of cholera. Secretary of the Manchester Chess Club, England. He invented the first mechanical chess clock in 1883.
- Mattia Cavallotti died in Milan. Cavallotti Countergambit.
- Matteo Gladig died in Ljubljana. Italian master.
- 19 March - Eugene Cook, died in Hoboken, NJ. 1st American composer of note.
- 2 November - Isaac Rice, American inventor and chess patron, died in USA. Rice Gambit.
