= Mannheim 1914 chess tournament =

Chess tournament halted due to outbreak of World War I

The 19th DSB Congress (19. Kongreß des Deutschen Schachbundes), comprising several tournaments, began on 20 July 1914 in Mannheim. Germany declared war on Russia (on August 1) and on France (August 3), Britain joining in the next day. The congress was stopped on 1 August 1914.

The tournament took place in the "Ballhaus", a building situated in the Mannheim Palace garden area.

The following participants played in the Masters tournament (Meisterturnier):

- from the Austro-Hungarian Empire: Gyula Breyer (Hungary), Oldřich Duras (Bohemia), Richard Réti (Slovakia), Rudolf Spielmann (Austria), Savielly Tartakower (Poland), and Milan Vidmar (Slovenia)
- from the Russian Empire: Alexander Aljechin (Russia), Efim Bogoljubov (Ukraine), and Alexander Flamberg (Poland)
- from France: Dawid Janowski (France)
- from the German Empire: Siegbert Tarrasch (Nürnberg), Walter John (Breslau), Paul Krüger (Hamburg), Carl Carls (Bremen), Ehrhardt Post (Berlin), and Jacques Mieses (Leipzig)
- from Switzerland: Hans Fahrni (Switzerland)
- from the United States: Frank James Marshall (USA).

Alexander Alekhine was leading the Meisterturnier, with nine wins, one draw and one loss, when World War I broke out. German organizers of the tournament decided that the players should be "indemnified" according to their score, but not paid the total prize money. Thus Alekhine got 1100 marks, Vidmar 850, Spielmann 600, Breyer, Marshall and Reti 375 each, Janowski 250, Bogoljubov and Tarrasch 180 marks, and all the others 100 marks. Calculated in terms of purchasing power in 2005, the sums would be multiplied ten times in euros. So Alekhine's "consolation prize" was 11,000 Euros.

== Meisterturnier ==
Mannheim 1914, Meisterturnier
		1	2	3	4	5	6	7	8	9	0	1	2	3	4	5	6	7	8	Total
1	Alexander Alekhine (Russian Empire)	X	-	-	1	-	-	0	1	1	1	-	-	1	1	1	½	1	1	9½
2	Milan Vidmar (Austria-Hungary)	-	X	½	½	½	1	1	-	-	½	1	½	-	1	1	1	-	-	8½
3	Rudolf Spielmann (Austria-Hungary)	-	½	X	-	1	½	0	-	1	½	1	½	1	-	-	-	1	1	8
4	Gyula Breyer (Austria-Hungary)	0	½	-	X	-	½	½	0	1	-	-	-	1	½	1	-	1	1	7
5	Frank Marshall (United States)	-	½	0	-	X	1	1	½	½	-	1	½	1	-	-	-	½	½	7
6	Richard Réti (Austria-Hungary)	-	0	½	½	0	X	½	-	-	1	1	1	1	½	-	1	-	-	7
7	Dawid Janowski (France)	1	0	1	½	0	½	X	1	-	-	0	1	-	-	½	-	1	-	6½
8	Efim Bogoljubov (Russian Empire)	0	-	-	1	½	-	0	X	½	0	-	-	-	1	1	½	0	1	5½
9	Siegbert Tarrasch (German Empire)	0	-	0	0	½	-	-	½	X	1	0	-	-	1	1	1	½	-	5½
10	Oldřich Duras (Austria-Hungary)	0	½	½	-	-	0	-	1	0	X	1	0	0	-	-	-	1	1	5
11	Walter John (German Empire)	-	0	0	-	0	0	1	-	1	0	X	1	1	-	-	1	-	0	5
12	Savielly Tartakower (Austria-Hungary)	-	½	½	-	½	0	0	-	-	1	0	X	½	0	-	½	-	1	4½
13	Hans Fahrni (Switzerland)	0	-	0	0	0	0	-	-	-	1	0	½	X	1	1	½	-	-	4
14	Ehrhardt Post (German Empire)	0	0	-	½	-	½	-	0	0	-	-	1	0	X	0	-	1	1	4
15	Carl Carls (German Empire)	0	0	-	0	-	-	½	0	0	-	-	-	0	1	X	½	½	1	3½
16	Paul Krüger (German Empire)	½	0	-	-	-	0	-	½	0	-	0	½	½	-	½	X	½	½	3½
17	Alexander Flamberg (Russian Empire)	0	-	0	0	½	-	0	1	½	0	-	-	-	0	½	½	X	-	3
18	Jacques Mieses (German Empire)	0	-	0	0	½	-	-	0	-	0	1	0	-	0	0	½	-	X	2

== Hauptturnier A ==
The following participants played in the Main tournament (Hauptturnier A):

- from the Austro-Hungarian Empire: Lajos Asztalos (Hungary) and Karel Opočenský (Bohemia)
- from the Russian Empire: Fedor Bogatyrchuk (Ukraine), Boris Maljutin, Ilya Rabinovich, and Alexey Selezniev, all from Russia
- from the German Empire: Carl Ahues, Wilhelm Hilse, Oscar Tenner, Wilhelm Schönmann, and B. Studt (Germany)
- from Switzerland: Hans Duhm (Germany), Walter Henneberger (Switzerland)
- from Netherlands: Willem Schelfhout (Netherlands)
- from Australia: Gunnar Gundersen (Norway)
- from Romania: Sigmund Herland (Romania)
- from the Ottoman Empire: B. Hallegua (Turkey).

Mannheim 1914, Hauptturnier A
		1	2	3	4	5	6	7	8	9	0	1	2	3	4	5	6	7	Total
1	Bohor Hallegua (Ottoman Empire)	X	-	0	1	-	½	1	1	½	1	½	-	1	-	1	-	½	8
2	Ilya Rabinovich (Russian Empire)	-	X	1	0	½	-	-	-	1	1	1	1	0	1	-	1	-	7½
3	Oscar Tenner (German Empire)	1	0	X	-	0	1	1	0	-	-	-	-	1	1	1	½	1	7½
4	Carl Ahues (German Empire)	0	1	-	X	½	0	1	½	-	-	-	1	-	½	-	1	1	6½
5	Lajos Asztalos (Austria-Hungary)	-	½	1	½	X	-	½	-	1	½	½	½	-	0	-	1	-	6
6	Fedor Bogatyrchuk (Russian Empire)	½	-	0	1	-	X	-	½	0	1	0	-	1	-	1	-	½	5½
7	Sigmund Herland (Romania)	0	-	0	0	½	-	X	-	-	½	½	1	1	-	1	1	-	5½
8	Willem Schelfhout (Netherlands)	0	-	1	½	-	½	-	X	-	0	½	0	1	-	1	1	-	5½
9	B. Studt (German Empire)	½	0	-	-	0	1	-	-	X	-	1	1	0	-	1	0	1	5½
10	Alexey Selezniev (Russian Empire)	0	0	-	-	½	0	½	1	-	X	-	½	-	½	½	1	1	5½
11	Karel Opočenský (Austria-Hungary)	½	0	-	-	½	1	½	½	0	-	X	-	0	1	½	-	½	5
12	Boris Maljutin (Russian Empire)	-	0	-	0	½	-	0	1	0	½	-	X	-	1	-	1	½	4½
13	Wilhelm Hilse (German Empire)	0	1	0	-	-	0	0	0	1	-	1	-	X	½	0	-	½	4
14	Walter Henneberger (Switzerland)	-	0	0	½	1	-	-	-	-	½	0	0	½	X	1	0	-	3½
15	Wilhelm Schönmann (German Empire)	0	-	0	-	-	0	0	0	0	½	½	-	1	0	X	-	1	3
16	Hans Duhm (Switzerland)	-	0	½	0	0	-	0	0	1	0	-	0	-	1	-	X	-	2½
17	Gunnar Gundersen (Australia)	½	-	0	0	-	½	-	-	0	0	½	½	½	-	0	-	X	2½

== Hauptturnier B ==
The Hauptturnier B started with five preliminary groups of 10 players each. The two winner groups comprised 9 players each and completed their nine rounds respectively.

The first winner group was won by Julius Brach (Brno, Moravia), 6 (out of 8) points, ahead of Peter Yurdansky and Peter Romanovsky (both from Russia) and František Schubert (Mlada Boleslav, Bohemia), 5 points each. The following players were G.J. van Gelder (4½) (Netherlands), and C. Thönes (3½) (Germany), Salomon Szapiro (Lodz, Poland), H. Thelen (3 each) and P. Müller (1) (both from Germany).

The second winner group was won by Nikoly Rudnev (Kharkov, Ukraine), 7 (out of 8) points, followed by Józef Dominik (Cracow, Poland, 6), Max Lange (Berlin, Germany), 5) − not related to Max Lange −, Asch (4½) (Austria), M. Gargulak (Husovice near Brno, Moravia), and Heinrich Wagner (both 4), A.N. Hallgarten (3), K. Pahl (2) (all from Germany), and Anton Olson (½) (Sweden).

#	A winner group	Points	#	B winner group	Points
1	Julius Brach (Austria-Hungary)	6	1	Nikolay Rudnev (Russian Empire)	7
2-4	Peter Romanovsky (Russian Empire)	5	2	Józef Dominik (Austria-Hungary)	6
2-4	František Schubert (Austria-Hungary)	5	3	Max Lange (II) (German Empire)	5
2-4	Peter Yurdansky (Russian Empire)	5	4	Asch (Austria-Hungary)	4½
5	G.J. van Gelder (Netherlands)	4½	5-6	Metoděj Gargulák (Austria-Hungary)	4
6	C. Thönes (German Empire)	3½	5-6	Heinrich Wagner (German Empire)	4
7-8	Salomon Schapiro (Russian Empire)	3	7	Albert Hallgarten (German Empire)	3
7-8	Hermann Thelen (German Empire)	3	8	Kurt Pahl (German Empire)	2
9	P. Müller (German Empire)	1	9	Anton Olson (Sweden)	½

== Plans for an International Chess Federation ==
During the tournament, a group of Russian and German masters, including Peter Petrovich Saburov and World Champion Emanuel Lasker, who did not enter the tournament itself, followed an initiative from the Saint Petersburg 1914 tournament and made concrete plans for an International Chess Federation (see also FIDE).

== Outbreak of war and internees ==
The next DSB congresses, it was decided, were scheduled for Bad Oeynhausen (1916) and Munich (1918). But history took a different turn. The political situation became more and more tense while the tournament went on. Milan Vidmar, in his autobiography Goldene Schachzeiten, gives a fine report about the melancholic mood of the masters participating in the unfinished Mannheim "chess symphony". Soldiers of the German army began to dominate the city panorama. When Germany put first an ultimatum (July 31) and then declared war the following day against Russia, the tournament had to be interrupted.

After the declaration of war, eleven "Russian" players (Alekhine, Bogoljubov, Bogatyrchuk, Flamberg, Koppelman, Maljutin, Rabinovich, Romanovsky, Saburov, Selezniev, Weinstein) were interned in Rastatt, Germany. On September 14, 17, and 29, 1914, four of them (Alekhine, Bogatyrchuk, Saburov, and Koppelman) were freed and allowed to return home via Switzerland. A fifth player, Romanovsky was freed and went back to Petrograd in 1915, and a sixth one, Flamberg was allowed to return to Warsaw in 1916. Whilst imprisoned, some participated in the Triberg chess tournament.

Ukrainian master Efim Bogoljubov stayed in Triberg im Schwarzwald, married a local woman and spent the rest of his life in Germany, where he settled permanently since 1926.

Frenchman Dawid Janowski, born in the Russian Empire, as well as Alekhine, was interned but released to Switzerland after a short internment. Then he moved to the United States.

The American Frank James Marshall, being from a neutral country, was allowed to leave. It took him five days to travel to London, and he left almost at once for New York City. In his My Fifty Years of Chess Marshall wrote: "I made for the Dutch border and arrived in Amsterdam after many adventures. Usually a seven-hour trip, it took me 39 hours. Somewhere on the border I lost my baggage, containing all my belongings and the presents I received in St. Petersburg and elsewhere...Five years later, much to my astonishment, my trunks arrived in New York, with their contents intact!"

== Literature ==
- Werner Lauterbach (1964), Mannheim 1914, Düsseldorf: Walter Rau Verlag (tournament book) (in German)
- A. J. Gillam (2014), Mannheim 1914 and the Interned Russians, Nottingham: The Chess Player, ISBN 978-0992792428

== See also ==
- 8th Chess Olympiad - which took place during the outbreak of World War II.
