= Wilhelm Schönmann =

German chess player (1889–1970)

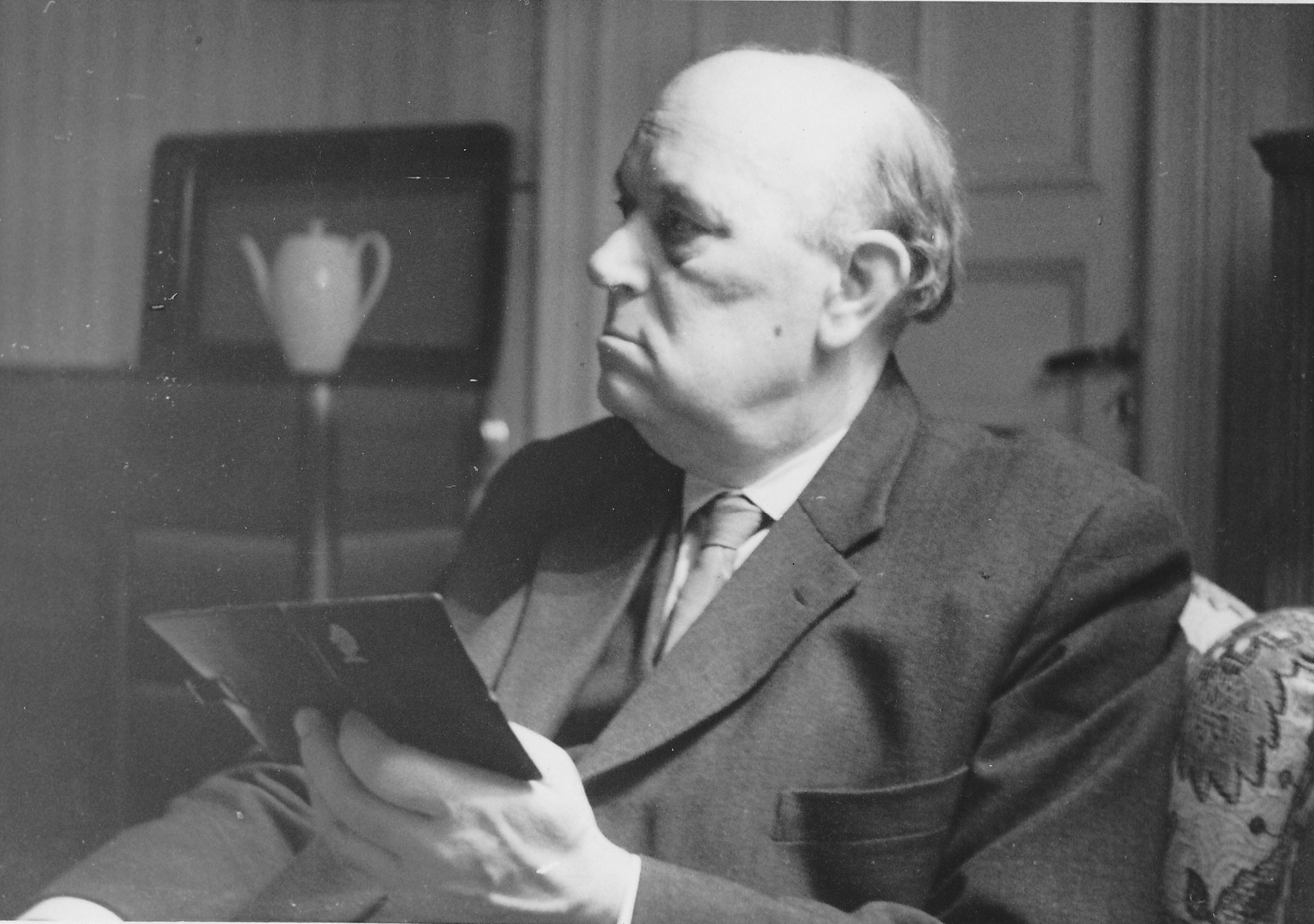
Wilhelm Schönmann, about 1960

Peter Heinrich Wilhelm Schönmann (Schoenmann) (7.4.1889–15.5.1970) was a German chess master.

He tied for 8-9th at Hamburg 1910 (DSB Congress, Hauptturnier B), shared 2nd at Hamburg 1913 (Paul Krüger won), won a simultan game against Emanuel Lasker at Hamburg 1914, and took 15th at Mannheim 1914 (the 19th DSB-Congress, Hauptturnier A, B. Hallegua won).

After World War I, he took 2nd at Berlin 1920 (DSB-Congress), took 4th at Kiel 1920 (Heinrich Wagner won), shared 1st at Vienna 1926 (B tournament), tied for 6-7th at Bremen 1927 (Efim Bogoljubow won), tied for 10-11th at Magdeburg 1927 (DSB-Congress, Rudolf Spielmann won), won at Lübeck 1928 (Quadrangular), shared 1st at Hamburg 1930, took 2nd, behind Herbert Heinicke, at Hamburg 1932, and took 8th at Aachen 1935 (the 3rd German Chess Championship, Kurt Richter won).

He played for Germany in 2nd unofficial Chess Olympiad at Budapest 1926 and 2nd Chess Olympiad at The Hague 1928.

After World War II, he played in several international correspondence tournaments. Until 1910, he composed a few chess studies.
