= Triberg chess tournament =

The Triberg chess tournament constitutes a series of chess tournaments, held in Triberg im Schwarzwald, Imperial Germany, during World War I.

== History ==
Eleven players from the Russian Empire, who participated in the interrupted Mannheim 1914 chess tournament, were interned in Rastatt, Germany, after the declaration of war against Russia on August 1, 1914. A few weeks later, on September 14, 17, and 29, 1914, four of them (Alekhine, Bogatyrchuk, Koppelman, Saburov) were freed and allowed to return home via Switzerland. A fifth player, Romanovsky was freed and went back to Petrograd in 1915, and a sixth one, Flamberg was allowed to return to Warsaw in 1916.

Eight tournaments were played by the internees, the first at Baden-Baden 1914 (won by Alexander Flamberg) and all the others in Triberg im Schwarzwald. Participation by the internees varied, but the tournaments were mostly won by Efim Bogoljubow.

== Participants ==
- Efim Bogoljubow Ukraine
- Alexander Flamberg Poland
- Boris Maljutin Russia
- Ilya Rabinovich Russia
- Peter Romanovsky Russia
- Alexey Selezniev Russia
- Samuil Weinstein Russia
- Hans Fahrni Switzerland

The final results:

== Results ==
=== Triberg 1914/15 ===
1. Bogoljubow, 2. Rabinovich, 3. Romanovsky, 4. Flamberg, 5. Selezniev, 6. Weinstein.

=== Triberg 1915 ===
1. Bogoljubow, 2. Rabinovich, 3. Flamberg, 4. Selezniev, 5. Romanovsky 6. Weinstein.

=== Triberg 1915/16 ===
1. Bogoljubow, 2. Rabinovich, 3. Selezniev.

=== Triberg 1916 ===
1. Rabinovich, 2-3. Bogoljubow and Selezniev, 4-5. Fahrni and Weinstein, 6. Maljutin.

=== Triberg 1917 ===
1-2. Selezniev and Rabinovich, 3. Bogoljubow, 4. Weinstein.

== Trivia ==
After the war, the Ukrainian master Bogoljubow remained in Triberg, where he married a local woman and spent most of the rest of his life in Germany (settling permanently in 1926).
