= Oscar Tenner =

German-American chess player (1880–1948)

Oscar Tenner (sometimes Oskar) (Hebrew: אוסקר טנר; 5 April 1880, in Lemberg – 24 December 1948) was a Galicia (Poland)-born German–American chess master.

At the beginning of his career, he played in several tournaments in Germany. He won (elim.) and took 4th at Hamburg 1910 (DSB Congress, C tournament), took 7th at Berlin 1911 (Carl Ahues won), tied for 9-10th at Breslau 1912 (DSB-Congress, Hauptturnier A, Bernhard Gregory won), shared 3rd at Jungbunzlau (Mlada Boleslav) 1913 (Karel Hromádka won), and tied for 2nd-3rd with Ilya Rabinovich, behind B. Hallegua, at Mannheim 1914 (interrupted DSB-Congress, Hauptturnier A).

After World War I, he tied for 6-7th at Berlin 1922 (Fritz Sämisch won), and then emigrated to the United States. He played many times in the Manhattan Chess Club Championship and other tournaments in New York. He tied for 4-5th in 1922 (Morris Schapiro won), took 5th in 1923 (Oscar Chajes won), took 2nd, behind José Raúl Capablanca, and shared 5th (Abraham Kupchik won) in 1924, tied for 6-8th in 1925 (Kupchik won), took 10th in 1926 (Géza Maróczy won), and tied for 8-9th in 1928 (Alexander Kevitz won). He also tied for 7-8th at Lake Hopatcong 1923 (the 9th American Chess Congress, Frank James Marshall and Kupchik won), and took 8th at Bradley Beach 1928 (Kupchik won).

After World War II, he took 41st at Baltimore 1948 (US Open Chess Championship, Weaver W. Adams won) at the age of 68.
