= St. Petersburg 1914 chess tournament =

International chess tournament

The St. Petersburg 1914 chess tournament (held from April 21st to May 22nd) was one of the most famous chess tournaments of the early twentieth century. It included almost all the leading players of the time, and was won by World Champion Emanuel Lasker, who came from behind to narrowly defeat future World Champion José Raúl Capablanca. Another future World Champion, Alexander Alekhine, finished third, ahead of the former World Championship contenders Siegbert Tarrasch and Frank Marshall. This is the last major pre-war international event completed for four years, as the Mannheim 1914 chess tournament was halted due to the outbreak of World War I.

== Background ==
The tournament was held to celebrate the tenth anniversary of the St. Petersburg Chess Society. The president of the organizing committee was Peter Petrovich Saburov. Members of the committee were: Boris Maliutin, Peter Alexandrovich Saburov, and O. Sossnitzky. They intended to invite the present top twenty chess players, with world champion Emanuel Lasker, challengers José Raúl Capablanca and Akiba Rubinstein, and the two winners of the All-Russian Masters' Tournament 1913/14 (Alexander Alekhine and Aron Nimzowitsch). Amos Burn, Richard Teichmann, and Szymon Winawer declined for reasons, such as old age. From the other side, Oldřich Duras, Géza Maróczy, Carl Schlechter, Rudolf Spielmann, Savielly Tartakower, Milan Vidmar and Max Weiss declined due to tensions of Russia with Austria-Hungary in the year 1914 which would led to war in a few months . Finally, eleven top players from Germany, France, United Kingdom, United States, Cuba, and Russian Empire were accepted.

According to Chessmetrics ratings, the tournament was a class 18 tournament, including six of the then top 10 players in the world (#1 Rubinstein, #2 Capablanca, #3 Marshall, #4 Alekhine, #5 Nimzowitsch, and #6 Tarrasch).

== Preliminaries ==
The preliminaries were held as a single round-robin tournament, with the top five places qualifying for the final. Capablanca secured first place well ahead of Lasker and Tarrasch. In an upset, co-favorite Rubinstein failed to achieve a top five spot, while the still relatively unknown Alekhine qualified for the final round.

The results and standings:

#	Player	1	2	3	4	5	6	7	8	9	10	11	Total
1	José Raúl Capablanca (Cuba)	*	½	½	1	½	1	½	1	1	1	1	8
2	Emanuel Lasker (German Empire)	½	*	½	½	½	0	1	½	1	1	1	6½
3	Siegbert Tarrasch (German Empire)	½	½	*	½	½	1	½	1	1	0	1	6½
4	Alexander Alekhine (Russian Empire)	0	½	½	*	1	½	1	½	½	½	1	6
5	Frank James Marshall (United States)	½	½	½	0	*	1	½	½	1	1	½	6
6	Ossip Bernstein (Russian Empire)	0	1	0	½	0	*	½	½	½	1	1	5
7	Akiba Rubinstein (Russian Empire)	½	0	½	0	½	½	*	½	½	1	1	5
8	Aron Nimzowitsch (Russian Empire)	0	½	0	½	½	½	½	*	0	½	1	4
9	Joseph Henry Blackburne (United Kingdom)	0	0	0	½	0	½	½	1	*	0	1	3½
10	Dawid Janowski (France)	0	0	1	½	0	0	0	½	1	*	½	3½
11	Isidor Gunsberg (United Kingdom)	0	0	0	0	½	0	0	0	0	½	*	1

== Final ==
St. Petersburg 1914
19th round
Lasker - Capablanca

Position: a8 black rook, c8 black bishop, e8 black king, f8 black bishop, g8 black knight, h8 black rook, b7 black pawn, c7 black pawn, f7 black pawn, g7 black pawn, h7 black pawn, a6 black pawn, c6 black pawn, d4 white knight, e4 white pawn, a2 white pawn, b2 white pawn, c2 white pawn, f2 white pawn, g2 white pawn, h2 white pawn, a1 white rook, b1 white knight, c1 white bishop, e1 white king, h1 white rook

Position after 1.e4 e5 2.Nf3 Nc6 3.Bb5 a6 4.Bxc6 dxc6 5.d4 exd4 6.Qxd4 Qxd4 7.Nxd4

The final tournament was a double-round tournament among the five players. The results of the preliminaries carried over into the finals, so Capablanca with a 1½-point lead was a heavy favorite to win the tournament. In the first half of the finals, Lasker narrowly escaped a loss against Capablanca, which would have virtually decided the tournament. Lasker made up half a point of the difference between himself and Capablanca, with the scores standing at Capablanca 11, Lasker 10, Alekhine 8½, Marshall 7, Tarrasch 6½.

In the 19th round, Lasker won a now-famous game against Capablanca with the Exchange Variation of the Ruy Lopez, trading queens on the sixth move (1.e4 e5 2.Nf3 Nc6 3.Bb5 a6 4.Bxc6 dxc6 5.d4 exd4 6.Qxd4 Qxd4 7.Nxd4) and then outplaying Capablanca in the endgame. Luděk Pachman remarks that Lasker's choice of opening was a masterstroke, since Capablanca was intent on simplifying the game to obtain a draw, and the line Lasker chose requires Black to play actively in order to exploit his advantage of the bishop pair and not allow White to exploit his superior pawn structure. Capablanca, intent on avoiding complications, played too passively and was routed by Lasker. In the following round, a shaken Capablanca lost as White from a superior position against Tarrasch. This allowed Lasker (who scored a remarkable 7/8) to overtake Capablanca, winning the tournament by a half point.

Lasker won 1200 rubles (in addition to his appearance fee of 4500 rubles (Note: The ruble was worth about 0.50 USD in 1914, making 5700 rubles worth $73,000 in 2015 money.)), Capablanca 800 rubles, Alekhine 500 rubles, Tarrasch 300 rubles, and Marshall 250 rubles. In addition, there was a Brilliancy Prize Fund, of which Capablanca was awarded 125 rubles for his win over Bernstein, Tarrasch was awarded 75 rubles (Second Prize) for his win over Nimzowitsch, and Blackburne won 50 rubles (Special Brilliancy Prize) for his win over Nimzowitsch. The prize fund was more than covered by the record "gate" of 6,000 rubles from the spectators. Tarrasch wrote a famous book on this tournament in German, which was not translated into English until 1993.

The final results and standings:

#	Player	Prel.	1	2	3	4	5	Total
1	Emanuel Lasker (German Empire)	6½	**	½1	11	1½	11	13½
2	José Raúl Capablanca (Cuba)	8	½0	**	½1	10	11	13
3	Alexander Alekhine (Russian Empire)	6	00	½0	**	11	1½	10
4	Siegbert Tarrasch (German Empire)	6½	0½	01	00	**	0½	8½
5	Frank James Marshall (United States)	6	00	00	0½	1½	**	8
