= Salomon Szapiro =

Polish chess player (1882–1944)

Salomon Szapiro (Schapiro) known as Dr. Szeffer (1882–1944) was a Polish chess master.

Born in Łódź, he moved to Germany where he studied medicine and received his M.D. degree. He tied for 3rd-5th at Hanover 1902 (DSB Congress, Hauptturnier B), took 4th at Coburg 1904 (DSB Congress, Hauptturnier B), took 7th at Barmen 1905 (D tournament), took 4th at Lodz 1909, shared 1st at Nuremberg 1909, took 6th at Hamburg 1910 (DSB Congress, Hauptturnier B), tied for 2nd-3rd at Munich 1911, tied for 6-7th at St. Petersburg 1911 (All-Russian Amateur Tournament, Stepan Levitsky won), tied for 9-10th at Breslau 1912 (DSB Congress, Hauptturnier B), shared 2nd at Bad Kissingen 1913 (B tourn.), and tied for 7-8th in the Mannheim 1914 chess tournament (19. Kongreß des Deutschen Schachbundes, Hauptturnier B, Julius Brach won). Then he returned to Lodz.

After World War I, he participated several times in the Lodz City championships. He took 3rd in 1923, took 11th in 1928, tied for 8-9th in 1930, shared 4th in 4th in 1931, tied for 5-6th in 1933, and took 12th in 1934.

In 1939, he published in Hebrew, as Dr. Szeffer, a commentary on the Bible. On February 9, 1944, he had played his last chess game with Dawid Daniuszewski in the Lodz Ghetto where he died.
