= Julius Brach =

Czech chess player (1881–1938)

Julius Brach (9 January 1881 – 4 July 1938) was a Czech chess master.

== Life and career ==
Brach was born on 9 January 1881 in Brno. In the beginning of his career, he won at Brno 1899, took third at Osyky u Lomnice, placed second at Brno 1901, and third at Brno 1905. He tied for fifth at Nuremberg 1906 (the 15th DSB Congress, Hauptturnier A, Savielly Tartakower won), and shared second at Brno 1907 (the second Czech Chess Championship).

He won at Brno 1908, tied for eighth at Prague 1908 (B tournament), took second at Brno 1909, and took sixth at Prague 1909 (the third CZE-ch, Oldřich Duras won). In 1909, he played three matches in Brno; drew with Karel Hromádka (3 : 3), beat A. Perna (4 : 0), and defeated M. Gargulak (2.5 : 0.5). He took second at Brno 1911, tied for fifth at Breslau 1912 (the 18th DSB Congress, Hauptturnier B, Paul Krüger), won at Brno 1913, and won in the Mannheim 1914 chess tournament (the 19th DSB Congress, Hauptturnier B).

During World War I, he shared third at Brno 1916, won at Brno 1917, and tied for ninth at Košice 1918. After the war, he won at Brno 1920, tied for 8th–9th at Brno 1921 (the second Czechoslovak Chess Championship), took third at Piešťany 1922 (B tournament), tied for ninth at Znojmo 1927, and took eighth at Olomouc 1930.

Brach died on 4 July 1938 in Vyškov.
