= Jean Taubenhaus =

French chess player (1850–1919)

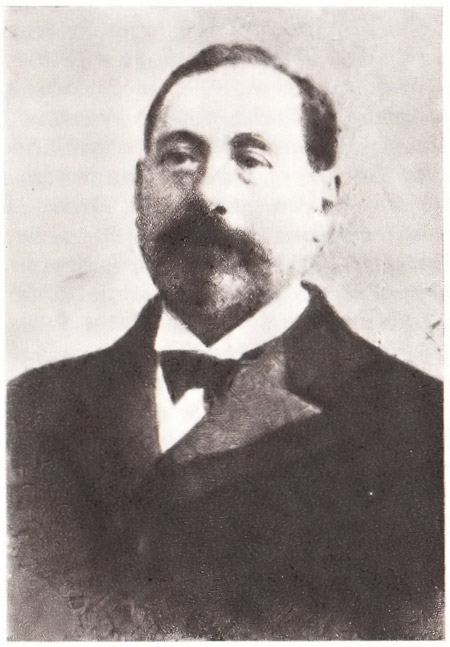

Jean Taubenhaus (Polish: Jan Taubenhaus; 14 December 1850 – 14 September 1919) was a Polish–born French chess master.

== Biography ==
Taubenhaus was born in Warsaw, Congress Poland in 1850.

Taubenhaus was a foremost Warsaw chess player in late 1870s. In 1880, he settled in Paris. In the 4th international Congress of the German Chess Association (DSB) at Hamburg in July 1885, he took 14th place. His best achievement was the London tournament of 1886, where he tied for 3rd-4th places together with Isidor Gunsberg, after Joseph Henry Blackburne and Amos Burn, in strong London competition. He had significant victories over Blackburne, unchallenged leader of English chess, and Gunsberg, Steinitz's opponent in later match for the world championship. In 1886, he took 6th at Nottingham. In 1887, he took 19th at Frankfurt (5th DSB Congress). In 1888, he took 8th at Bradford. In 1889, he tied for 12th–13th at New York (6th US Congress). In 1890, he took 10th at Manchester (6th BCA Congress).

Living in Paris, Taubenhaus gave lessons at the Café de la Régence, where he played every day. In 1890, he took 2nd, behind Alphonse Goetz, at the Cafe. In 1892, he took 9th at the Cafe. In 1893–95, he stayed in America. In October 1893, he took 8th at New York. Then he played in Argentina and Cuba. In 1899, he played in Warsaw competition.

In 1901, he took 3rd, behind Stanislaus Sittenfeld and Adolf Albin, at Paris (Quadrangular). In 1902, he took 2nd, behind Dawid Janowski, at Paris (Quadrangular). In 1902, he tied for 1st with Janowski at Paris (Pentagonal). In 1903, he tied for 10–11th at Monte Carlo. In 1905, he took 14th at Ostend. In 1905, he won at Paris. In 1906, he took 7th at Ostend (el. 2nd stage). In 1913/14, he took 14th at St Petersburg.

Taubenhaus played several memorable matches. He drew with Sittenfeld (Paris, 1891); lost to Siegbert Tarrasch (Nuremberg 1891, 1892), Jacques Mieses (Glasgow, 1895), Janowski (Paris 1903, 1905), Miguel Angel Gelly (Buenos Aires, 1907), Walter Romain Lovegrove (Paris, 1912); and won against Andrés Clemente Vázquez (Havana 1894/95), Albin (Paris, 1901), Benito Villegas (Buenos Aires, 1907), Richard Teichmann (Paris, 1911).

Taubenhaus is the author of Traité du Jeu d’Échecs, published in 1910. He died in Paris in 1919.

== Mephisto ==
Taubenhaus was a primary operator of the remote-controlled Mephisto chess player machine. The third automaton Mephisto was made by Charles Godfrey Gumpel, and unlike its predecessors The Turk and Ajeeb, it had no hidden operator and functioned by electro-mechanical means. Gumpel took a few years to build it and it was first shown in 1876 at his Leicester Square home in London. It was the first automaton to win a chess tournament when it was entered in the Counties Chess Association at London in 1878. Mephisto was operated by Isidor Gunsberg in the main. It was shown regularly for 10 years, and at one time had its own club in the UK. When Mephisto went to the Paris Exposition in 1889 it was operated by Taubenhaus. After 1889 it was dismantled and its subsequent whereabouts are unknown.

== Notable chess games ==
- Johann Nepomuk Berger vs. Jean Taubhausen, Hamburg 1885, 4th DSB Congress, Ruy Lopez, Morphy Defense, Tarrasch Variation, C77, 0–1 The game received the best game prize.
- Jean Taubhausen vs. Joseph Henry Blackburne, London 1886, French Defense, Classical Variation, C14, 1–0
- Jean Taubenhaus vs. William Pollock, Nottingham 1886, King's Gambit Accepted Allgaier Gambit, Thorold Attack, C39, 1–0
- Jean Taubenhaus vs. Dawid Janowski, Paris 1903, match, Ruy Lopez, Closed, C87, ½–½
- Geza Maroczy vs Jean Taubenhaus, Monte Carlo 1903, R1 2/10, Ruy Lopez, Closed, Averbakh Variation, C87, 0–1
- Jean Taubenhaus vs. Andrey Smorodsky, Sankt Petersburg 1914, Sicilian Defense, Classical Variation, B58, 1–0
