= Peter Saburov =

Peter Saburov may refer to:

- Peter Alexandrovich Saburov (1835–1918), diplomat, collector of antiquities, amateur chess player and patron of chess tournaments
- Peter Petrovich Saburov (1880–1932), Russian diplomat, chess master and organizer, and musical composer
