= Willem Schelfhout =

Dutch chess player (1874–1951)

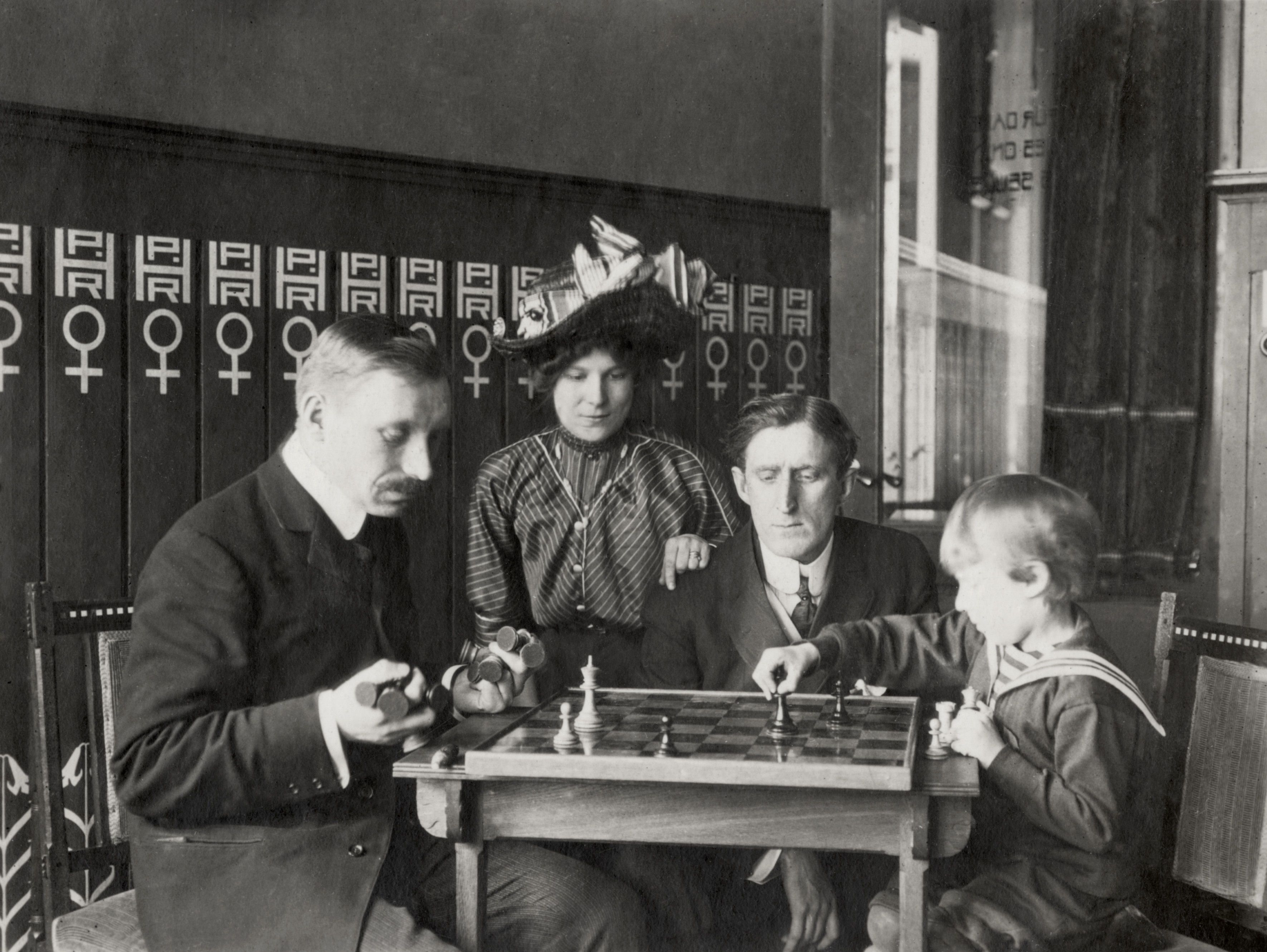
Schelfhout (left) playing with American chess champion Frank Marshall's young son in Amsterdam (1911)

Willem Andreas Theodorus Schelfhout (19 May 1874, The Hague – 30 January 1951) was a Dutch chess master.

Before World War I, he took 4th at Leiden 1909 (B tournament), tied for 5-6th at Amsterdam 1910, took 3rd at Hamburg 1910 (Hauptturnier B), tied for 7-8th at Cologne 1911 (Moishe Lowtzky won), took 13th at Scheveningen 1913 (Alexander Alekhine won), and shared 6th at Mannheim 1914 (the 19th DSB Congress, Hauptturnier A, B. Hallegua won).

During the war (The Netherlands were neutral in World War I), he played in several tournaments, and won at The Hague 1917 (Quadrangular). After the war, he took 7th at Amsterdam 1920 (Richard Réti won), and participated a few times in Dutch Chess Championship. He tied for 6-8th at The Hague 1919 (Max Marchand won), took 6th at Nijmegen 1921, shared 4th at Amsterdam 1924, took 4th at Utrecht 1926 (all won by Max Euwe), and took 6th at Rotterdam 1936 (Salo Landau won).

Schelfhout drew a mini match with Euwe (1 : 1) in 1923 and lost (0 : 2) to him in 1927, both in Amsterdam.

He represented the Netherlands in Chess Olympiads at London 1927, The Hague 1928, and Hamburg 1930.

During World War II, he took 3rd at Amsterdam 1940 (VVGA, Euwe won).
