= Sittenfeld =

Sittenfeld is a surname. Notable people with the surname include:

- Curtis Sittenfeld (born 1975), American novelist
- P.G. Sittenfeld (born 1984), American politician
- Stanislaus Sittenfeld (1865–1902), Polish–French chess master
