= Dawid Daniuszewski =

Polish chess player

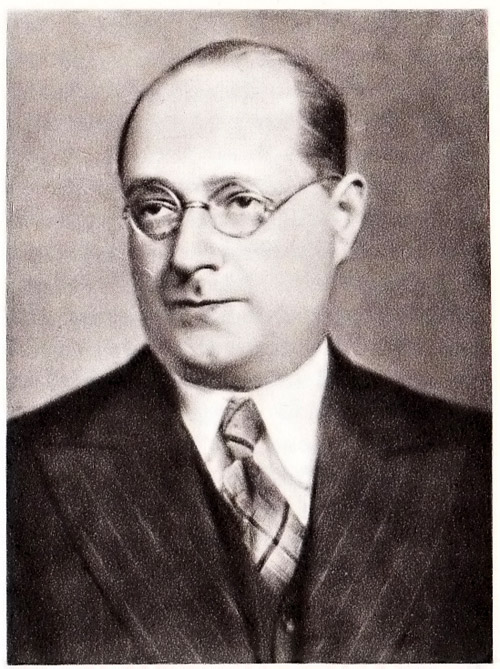

Dawid Daniuszewski (1885–1944) was a Polish chess master.

== Biography ==
In 1906, he finished 2nd, behind Akiba Rubinstein, in Łódź. In 1907, he again finished 2nd, behind Rubinstein, and ahead of Gersz Rotlewi and Gersz Salwe in Łódź (Quadrangular). In 1907/08, he took 10th in Łódź (the 5th All-Russian Masters' Tournament; Rubinstein won). In 1909, he tied for 1st-2nd with Rotlewi in Łódź. In 1909, he tied for 4-6th in Saint Petersburg (All-Russian Amateur Tournament; Alexander Alekhine won). In 1912, he took 6th in Łódź (Efim Bogoljubov won).

The period from 1915 to 1921 he spent in Russia. In 1920, he tied for 9-10th in Moscow (1st USSR Championship) won by Alekhine. Then he returned to Poland, and lived in Łódź where he took 2nd behind Jakub Kolski in 1922/23 and tied for 1st-2nd with Gottesdiener in 1924. The same year, he took 3rd in Warsaw (Quadrangular; Gottesdiener won) and represented Poland at 1st unofficial Chess Olympiad in Paris (+6 –4 =3). In 1927, he took 10th in Łódź at the 2nd Polish Championship which was won by Rubinstein. Mial 1m60

At the end of his life, Daniuszewski played with Dr. Salomon Szapiro in the Lodz Ghetto on February 9, 1944. Daniuszewki died in 1944, the details of his death and the exact date are not known.

== Notable chess games ==
- Dawid Daniuszewski vs Akiba Rubinstein, Lodz 1907, Ruy Lopez, Nuremberg Variation, C60, 1-0
- Alexander Alekhine vs Dawid Daniuszewski, Moscow 1920, URS-ch, Bishop's Opening, Vienna Hybrid, C28, 0-1
- Georges Koltanowski vs Dawid Daniuszewski, Paris 1924 (ol), Slav Indian, A50, 0-1
- Dawid Daniuszewski vs Samuel Szapiro, Lodz ghetto 1944, French Defense, Winawer, Bogoljubow Variation, C17, 1-0
