= Gunnar Gundersen (chess player) =

Australian chess player

Gunnar Gundersen (11 March 1882 in Bordeaux – 9 February 1943 in Melbourne) was an Australian chess master.

Born in Bordeaux, France, he was raised in Melbourne, Australia, where his Norwegian father was the Scandinavian consul. Gundersen started to play chess at his first year of study at Melbourne University in 1902. He would eventually become a professor of mathematics at the same university.

He participated in the Mannheim 1914 chess tournament (the 19th DSB Congress, 19. Kongreß des Deutschen Schachbundes), scoring 2.5/10 in the Main tournament (Hauptturnier A) before the outbreak of World War I stopped the event on 1 August 1914. The Morning Post of 14 September gave an account of the Australian, Gundersen. "There was a hurried pro-rata distribution of the prize-fund, in which those who happened to be present participated, and Mr. Gundersen himself succeeded in getting away to Christiana [now Oslo] at a cost of semi-starvation and extraordinary fatigue, for the train was six days on what should have been a 36 hours' journey, and during that time he had only two meals and ten hours sleep".

Gundersen won the Victorian State Championship in 1907, 1908, 1912, 1913, 1915, 1916, 1917, 1918, 1919, 1920, 1922 and 1929; won the Pietzcker Christmas Tournament in Melbourne in 1925/26 and 1926/27; and won the New Zealand Chess Championship at Wanganui 1929/30 and Napier 1931/32.
