= Alexey Selezniev =

Russian chess player (1888–1967)

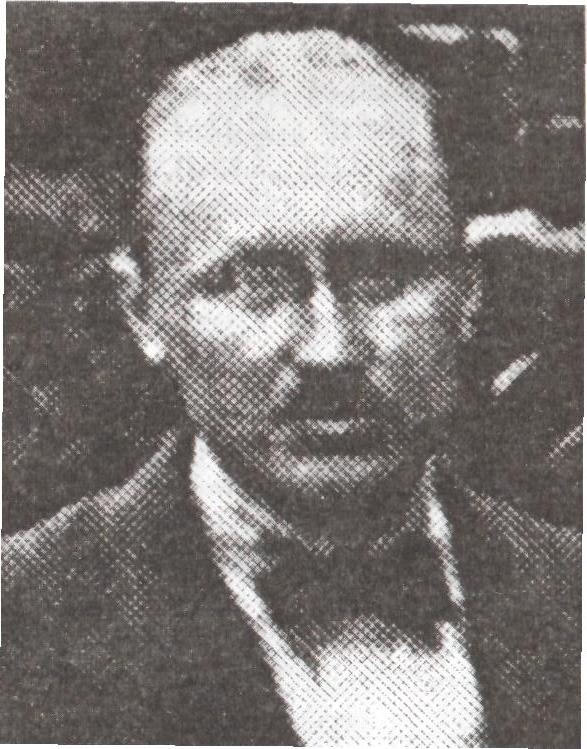

Alexey (Alex) Sergeyevich Selezniev (Russian: Алексе́й Серге́евич Селезнёв, alternative transliterations: Selesniev, Selesniew, Selesnev, Selesnieff; pronounced "selezNYOFF"; 1888 – June 1967) was a Russian chess master and chess composer.

Selezniev was born in Tambov, Russian Empire, into a wealthy merchant Russian family, and was a graduate from Moscow University's law faculty. He played in a number of pre-revolutionary tournaments at the Moscow Chess Club. He tied for 8-10th at Vilna 1912 (7th RUS-ch, B tourn, Karel Hromadka won). In 1913, he tied for 1st-2nd, tied for 4-5th, and tied for 5-6th in Moscow.

In July–August 1914, he played in Mannheim (19th DSB Congress), and tied for 6-10th in interrupted tournament (Hauptturnier A). After the declaration of war against Russia, eleven “Russian players” (Alekhine, Bogoljubow, Bogatyrchuk, Flamberg, Koppelman, Maliutin, Rabinovich, Romanovsky, Saburov, Selezniev, Weinstein) from the Mannheim tournament were interned by Germany. In September 1914, four of them (Alekhine, Bogatyrchuk, Saburov, and Koppelman) were freed and allowed to return home through Switzerland. The Russian internees played eight tournaments, the first in Baden-Baden (1914) and all the others in Triberg im Schwarzwald (1914–1917). Selesniew tied for 4-5th at Baden-Baden 1914 (Alexander Flamberg won), and took 5th at Triberg 1914 (Efim Bogoljubow won). He took 4th, tied for 2nd-3rd, took 2nd, and took 3rd at Triberg 1915 (all tournaments Bogoljubov won). He tied for 2nd-3rd at Triberg 1916 (Ilya Rabinovich won). He won (jointly with Rabinovich) in the Triberg chess tournament in 1917.

Selezniev played several matches. In 1916, he drew with Hans Fahrni in Triberg (+2 –2 =2); in 1917 lost to Bogoljubow in Triberg (+2 –3 =3); in 1920 won against Curt von Bardeleben in Berlin (+2 –0 =4), in 1921 won against Richard Teichmann in Berlin (+1 –0 =1).

After World War I, in 1919, he won in Berlin (Quadrangular), and took 2nd, behind Bogoljubow. In 1920, he won in Berlin, and took 14th in Göteborg (Richard Réti won). In 1921, he tied for 3rd-4th (Pentagonal, Alexander Alekhine won) and took 4th (Quadrangular, Akiba Rubinstein won) in Triberg. In 1922, he tied for 14-15th in Piešťany (Pistyan) (Bogoljubow won). In 1923, he took 4th in Maehrisch-Ostrau (Emanuel Lasker won). In 1924, he tied for 4-5th in Meran (Ernst Grünfeld won).

He and Bogoljubov had careers that followed similar paths. Both players were interned in Germany for the duration of World War I, and decided to stay there until 1924. That year, both players were sent invitations to participate in the third USSR Championship, and somehow Nikolai Krylenko convinced them to play and stay in the Soviet Union.

Selezniev participated in the third, fourth, fifth and sixth USSR Championships (1924, 1925, 1927, and 1929), but had only mediocre results each time. He tied for 6-8th at Moscow 1924 (Bogoljubov won), took 14th at Leningrad 1925 (Bogoljubov won), tied for 15-17th at Moscow 1927 (Fedor Bogatyrchuk and Peter Romanovsky won). Selezniev won, ahead of Vsevolod Rauzer, at Poltava 1927 (4th UKR-ch, off contest), and tied for 3rd-4th at Odessa 1928 (5th UKR-ch, Yakov Vilner and Vladimir Kirillov won). He was eliminated in the quarter-final of play at Odessa 1929 (6th USSR-ch). He tied for 4-6th in the semi-final of 7th USSR-ch in 1931. He took 10th at Leningrad 1935 (Vasily Panov won). He was living in the Ukrainian city of Donetsk when it was overrun by Nazis. Bogoljubov helped him get transferred to Triberg, and he eventually made his way to France.

After World War II, he took 4th at Oldenburg 1948 (Povilas Tautvaišas won).

Seleniev died in Bordeaux, France.
