= Paul Krüger (chess player) =

German chess player (1871–1939)

Paul Krüger (Krueger) (12 October 1871 – 7 August 1939) was a German chess master.

== Biography ==
He lived in Hamburg. At the beginning of his career, he shared 2nd at Dresden 1892 (the 7th DSB Congress, Hauptturnier C), won at Danzig 1898, tied for 2nd-3rd at Berlin 1899/1900, tied for 4-5th at Munich 1900 (the 12th DSB–Congress, Hauptturnier A, Rudolf Swiderski won), took 11th at Haarlem 1901 (Adolf Georg Olland won), won at Breslau 1912 (the 18th DSB–Congress, Hauptturnier B), won at Hamburg 1913, and tied for 15-16th at Mannheim 1914 (interrupted the 19th DSB–Congress, Alexander Alekhine won).

After World War I, he tied for 5-7th at Hamburg 1921 (the 21st DSB–Congress, Ehrhardt Post won), took 7th at Bad Oeynhausen 1922 (the 22nd DSB–Congress, Post won), took 7th at Frankfurt 1923 (the 23rd DSB–Congress, Ernst Grünfeld won), tied for 6-7th at Bremen 1927 (Efim Bogoljubow won), shared 3rd at Hamburg 1927, won twice in Salzuflen in 1925 and 1930, and took 4th at Bad Pyrmont 1931 (Bogoljubow won).
