= Samuil Vainshtein =

Russian chess player (1894–1942)

Samuil Osipovich Vainshtein (Weinstein, Wainstein, Vainstein, Wajnsztejn) (1894–1942) was a Russian chess master, organizer, publisher and editor.

In July/August 1914, he was playing in Mannheim at (the 19th DSB Congress, when it was interrupted by the start of World War I. After the declaration of war against Russia, eleven Russian players (Alekhine, Bogoljubow, Bogatyrchuk, Flamberg, Koppelman, Maljutin, Rabinovich, Romanovsky, Saburov, Selezniev, Weinstein) from the Mannheim tournament were interned in Germany. In September, four of them (Alekhine, Bogatyrchuk, Saburov, and Koppelman) were freed and allowed to return home through Switzerland. As an internee, Weinstein played seven tournaments. He took 7th at Baden-Baden 1914 (Alexander Flamberg won), took 6th at Triberg 1914/15 (Efim Bogoljubow won), tied for 5-6th, and twice took 6th at Triberg 1915 (all tournaments Bogoljubov won), tied for 4-5th at Triberg 1916 (Ilya Rabinovich won), and took 4th at Triberg 1917 (Rabinovich and Alexey Selezniev won).

After the war, he returned to Russia, and lived in Petrograd (Leningrad), where he played in several tournaments. He tied for 7-8th in the 1st Leningrad City Chess Championship in 1920 (I. Rabinovich won), took 4th in 1921 (Platz won), twice finished 10th, in 1922 and 1925 (both won by Grigory Levenfish), and tied for 3rd-4th in 1925 (Gotthilf won). He also shared 4th at Moscow 1920 ("Chess Olympiad", B tournament), and tied for 8-10th at Moscow 1927 (Peter Romanovsky won).

He knew all the principal European languages perfectly. Vainshtein was one of the most authoritative chess workers. He headed the All-Russian chess union as early as 1924 and was both publisher and editor of the Shakhmatnyi Listok ("Chess Leaflet") magazine. He was an organizer and administrator of Leningrad Chess Club (since 1938 the head of the club). He died during the siege of Leningrad in 1942.
