= Peter Iordansky =

Russian chess player (1891–1937)

Peter Konstantinovich Yurdansky (Yurdanski, Yordansky, Jordansky) (1891–1937) was a Russian and later Soviet chess player.

He won Moscow City Chess Championship in 1913 and tied for 8-9th at Moscow 1913, shared 2nd at Mannheim 1914 tournament (the 19th DSB Congress, Hauptturnier B), took 2nd at Moscow 1915, took 3rd at Moscow 1916, tied for 7-8th at Moscow 1924, and took 10th at Moscow 1925.

His name is attached with the Yurdansky Attack in the Two Knights Defense (ECO: C56) 13.b4.
