= Hans Jørgen Gundersen =

Norwegian consul (1850–1927)

Hans Jørgen Gundersen (11 August 1850 – 1927) was a Norwegian consul.

He was born at sea, in the North Sea, as a son of shipmaster Peter Fredrik Gundersen and his wife Mathilde Susanne Larsen. In 1881 he married Sara Elisabeth Rerg. Their son Gunnar Gundersen became an internationally known chess player with Australian citizenship.

Gundersen finished his secondary education in Trondhjem in 1868 and graduated from the Royal Frederick University with the cand.jur. degree in 1871. He started his career in merchantry in France, then England. From 1879 Gundersen served as a vice consul in Bordeaux. He then worked as a clerk at the Swedish-Norwegian consulate-general in London from 1 February 1886 to 30 September 1887 before taking office as honorary consul for Sweden–Norway in Melbourne on 30 September 1887, a post which he left on 26 January 1906. In 1907 he became consul for Norway in Cardiff.

In 1897–1898 Gundersen funded and equipped an expedition to Kerguelen. He brought with him the ornithologist Robert Hall and several others on the brig Edward, leaving in October 1897 and spending 53 days at Kerguelen. The island was rich on seal and birds. The expedition was not an unequivocal financial success, as it was reported that "the 'take', comprising 19,000 gallons of blubber and 900 skins is barely expected to cover the cost of hiring and outfitting the vessel for the trip". It was more successful from an ornithological angle.

Gundersen was decorated as a Knight, First Class of the Order of St. Olav (1910) and the Order of Vasa.
