= Pyotr Romanovsky =

Russian chess player (1892-1964)

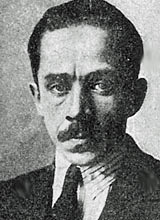

Personal information
- Born: Pyotr Arsenyevich Romanovsky; 29 July 1892 Saint Petersburg, Russian Empire
- Died: 1 March 1964 (aged 71) Moscow, Russian SFSR, Soviet Union

Chess career
- Title: International Master (1950)

Pyotr Arsenyevich Romanovsky (Russian: Пётр Арсеньевич Романо́вский; 29 July 1892 – 1 March 1964) was a Russian and Soviet chess player and author. He won the Soviet Championship in 1923 and, jointly, 1927.

== Biography ==
At the beginning of his career in Saint Petersburg, he shared fourth place in 1908 (Sergey von Freymann and Karl Wilhelm Rosenkrantz won), tied for 10–11th in 1909 (Alexander Alekhine won), took second place behind Smorodsky in 1913, and shared first with von Freymann in 1914 (Hexagonal).

Romanovsky participated in the Mannheim 1914 chess tournament (the 19th DSB Congress), begun on 20 July and stopped on 1 August, when World War I broke out. He was tied for second–fourth places in the Hauptturnier B event. After the declaration of war by the German Empire on the Russian Empire, eleven Russian players (Alekhine, Bogoljubow, Bohatyrchuk, Flamberg, Koppelman, Maliutin, Rabinovich, Romanovsky, Saburov, Selezniev, Vainshtein) were interned in Rastatt, Germany. On September 14, 17, and 29, 1914, four of them (Alekhine, Bohatyrchuk, Saburov, and Koppelman) were freed and allowed to return home via Switzerland. As an internee, he played in three tournaments. In 1914, he tied for fourth/fifth in Baden-Baden, as Flamberg won. He took third in the Triberg chess tournament 1914/15, and tied for fifth/sixth at Triberg 1915 (both won by Bogoljubow). After being released from internment by the Red Cross in spring 1915, due to his poor health (heart illness), he returned to Petrograd. When Romanovsky returned to Russia, he immediately helped raise money to aid the Russian chess players who were still interned in Germany by giving a simultaneous exhibition at the Saint Petersburg Polytechnical Institute.

=== 1920–35 ===
After the war, he took second, behind Alekhine, at Moscow 1920 (the first USSR Chess Championship). He was the Soviet Champion in 1923 (second USSR-ch in Petrograd) and 1927 (with Fedir Bohatyrchuk, fifth USSR Chess Championship, in Moscow). He tied for first with Grigory Levenfish, Alexander Ilyin-Genevsky and Ilya Rabinovich in the 1925 Leningrad City Chess Championship. In December 1925, he tied for seventh/eighth in the Moscow 1925 chess tournament. In 1927, he won in Leningrad. His best international result was in Leningrad 1934, finishing tied for second place with Nikolai Riumin, behind Mikhail Botvinnik. In 1934, he was the first Soviet chess player to be awarded Honoured Master of Sport.

=== Last years ===
During the worst period of the Siege of Leningrad in winter of 1941–42, a rescue party reached his home. They found Romanovsky half-conscious from starvation and cold. The rest of his family had frozen to death. All the furniture in the house had been used for firewood. A chess manuscript which had been in preparation by Romanovsky was also lost at this time.

Upon his recovery, Romanovsky found strength to live on, started a new family and continued to work tirelessly to promote chess and train chess players.

FIDE awarded him the International Master title in 1950 and the International Arbiter title in 1951.

In 1954, the Soviets withdrew their application for Romanovsky to receive the Grandmaster title, which had been based on his first place in the 1927 USSR championship. But because anti-Stalinist Fedir Bohatyrchuk had shared the title in 1927, and he was no longer recognized in the USSR as the result of his having defected, the USSR Chess Federation did not want to give the GM title to Bohatyrchuk, so they withdrew the application for Romanovsky as well.

Before his death, Romanovsky published two books on chess middlegames, which were translated into English in 1990: Chess Middlegames: Combinations, and Chess Middlegames: Strategy, both published by American Chess Promotions. In 2013 Quality Chess published both volumes together as Soviet Middlegame Technique.

== See also ==
- Rook and pawn versus rook endgame#Vančura position
