= Stanislaus Sittenfeld =

Polish-French chess player

Personal information
- Born: July 11, 1865 Piotrków, Congress Poland, Russian Empire
- Died: June 15, 1902 (aged 36) Davos, Switzerland

Chess career
- Title: Master

Stanislaus Sittenfeld (11 July 1865 in Piotrków, Poland – 15 June 1902 in Davos, Switzerland) was a Polish–French chess master.

Born in Congress Poland, he lived in Paris from 1884. He participated at the Café de la Régence championships in Paris and took 3rd place in 1890 and 1892. Both events were won by Alphonse Goetz.

Sittenfeld played several matches in Paris. In 1891 he drew with Jean Taubenhaus and won against Dawid Janowski. In 1892 he lost to Janowski and drew with him in 1893.

In 1901 he tied for 1st–2nd with Adolf Albin in Paris (Quadrangular).
