= Józef Dominik =

Polish chess player

- Born: 10 March 1894; Dobczyce, Poland
- Died: 10 September 1920 (aged 26); Krasne, Busk Raion, Ukraine
- Occupation: Chess master

Józef Dominik (10 March 1894 – 10 September 1920) was a Polish chess master.

== Biography ==
Born in Dobczyce (western Galicia), he was educated in Kraków (then Austria-Hungary). In his short chess career, he took 3rd at Cracow 1913 (Adolf Hauke won), took 2nd, behind Alexander Flamberg at Cracow 1914, took 2nd at Mannheim 1914 (Hauptturnier B, Rudniev won).

Dominik won at Vienna 1915 (Quadrangular), won at Cracow 1918, and took 5th at Warsaw 1919 (Zdzisław Belsitzmann won).

He died after a battle of Krasne (eastern Galicia) during the Polish-Soviet War in 1920.
