= Alphonse Goetz =

French chess player

Alphonse Goetz (a.k.a. A. Geoffroy-Dausay; 15 March 1865, in Strasbourg – 12 July 1934, in Chaumont-en-Vexin) was a French chess master.

Born in Strasbourg, France, he was a refugee after the Franco-Prussian War and the annexation of Alsace–Lorraine to the German Empire.

In 1890, he was first, followed by Jean Taubenhaus, Stanislaus Sittenfeld, etc., in Paris. In 1892, he won ahead of Dawid Janowski in Paris. In 1896, he took 2nd, behind Janowski, in Paris. Goetz was unofficial French Champion, winning at Lyon 1914.

He published articles: Les échecs et la presse (1917), The Parallel Progress of Chess and Civilization, in L’Eco degli Scacchi (1918), and books Cours d'échecs (1921), Cinema du Jeu des échecs (1922).
