= Bohor Hallegua =

Turkish chess player

Bohor Hallegua (188o-?) was a Turkish chess master.

In 1914, he played in three tournaments in pre-war Europe. He took 4th, behind Frank James Marshall, Alexander Alekhine and André Muffang, in the Quadrangular tournament of the Café Continental in Paris on July 12–14, and took 2nd, in a tournament in the Café de la Régence in Paris. Hallegua won (leading), ahead of Ilya Rabinovich and Oscar Tenner, Hauptturnier A in Mannheim tournament (interrupted the 19th DSB Congress, July/August 1914).
