= Boris Maliutin =

Russian chess player

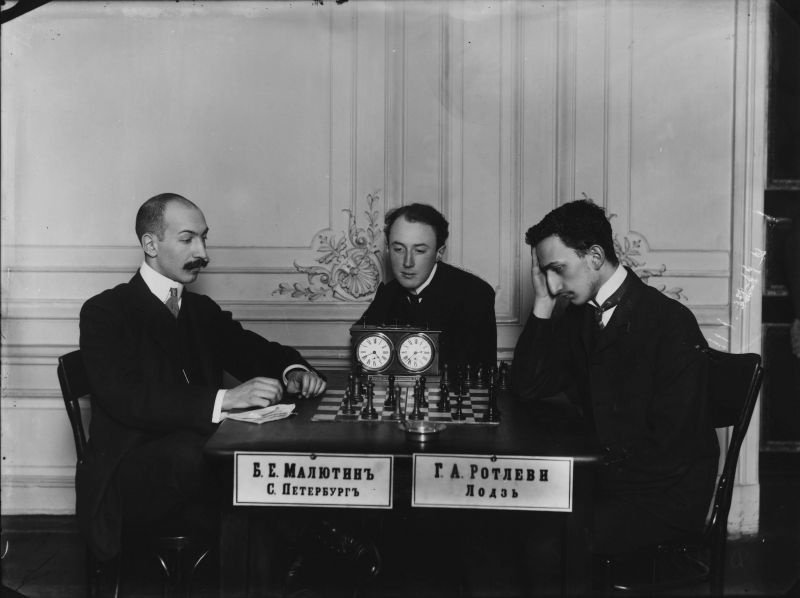
Boris Maliutin and Gersz Rotlewi, before 1910

Boris Evgenievich Maliutin (Maljutin, Malyutin, Malutin) (1883–1920) was a chess master.

== Chess career ==
He played many tournaments in Saint Petersburg. He took 4th in 1902, 8th in 1903, 13th, 5th, 2nd and 3rd in 1904, tied for 3-4th, tied for 4-5th, and took 3rd (Rice tournament) in 1905, tied for 13-14th in 1905/06 (All-Russian Masters' Tournament, Russian Chess Championship won by Gersz Salwe), took 6th in 1906, took 4th in 1907, took 3rd in 1908, tied for 4-6th in 1909 (Alexander Alekhine won), took 5th and tied for 12-13th in 1911 (Stepan Levitsky won).

B.E. Maliutin, along with Peter Alexandrovich Saburov, Peter Petrovich Saburov and Y.O. Sosnitsky, was one of the organizers of the St. Petersburg 1914 chess tournament.

Maljutin tied for 4-6th at Breslau 1912 (the 18th DSB Congress, Hauptturnier A, Bernhard Gregory won), and took 12th at the Mannheim 1914 chess tournament (the 19th DSB-Congress, Hauptturnier A, Hallegua won). In August 1914, he was interned, along with other "Russian" chess players by Germany after the declaration of war against Russia. Maliutin played in four tournaments for the internees. He took 6th in first tournament at Baden Baden 1914 (Alexander Flamberg won), took 5th at Triberg 1915 (Efim Bogoljubow won), took 5th at Triberg 1915/16 (Bogoljubow won), and took 6th at Triberg 1916/17 (Ilya Rabinovich won).
