= Peter Petrovich Saburov =

Russian composer

Peter Petrovich Saburov (Sabouroff) (14 January [O.S. 2 January] 1880, Saint Petersburg, Russia – 26 March 1932, Geneva, Switzerland) was a Russian diplomat, chess master and organizer, and musical composer.

He was a son of Peter Alexandrovich Saburov, a diplomat and chess organizer.

At the beginning of the 20th century, he played in several tournaments in St Petersburg, as well as in the preliminary stage of Ostend 1906 and Nuremberg 1906 (the 15th DSB Congress, Hauptturnier C).

P.P. Saburov, together with Boris E. Maliutin, O. Sossnitzky, V. Tschudowski, S.A. Znosko-Borovsky and Eugene A. Znosko-Borovsky, organized an international tournament at St Petersburg 1909. He, along with his father P.A. Saburov, B.E. Maliutin and Y.O. Sossnitsky, was one of the organizers of the St Petersburg international tournament in April–May 1914 (Emanuel Lasker won, ahead of José Raúl Capablanca).

In July/August 1914, he participated in Mannheim (the 19th DSB Congress), which was interrupted by the outbreak of World War I. After the declaration of war against Russia, eleven Russian players (Alekhine, Bogoljubow, Bogatyrchuk, Flamberg, Koppelman, Maliutin, Rabinovich, Romanovsky, Saburov, Selezniev, Vainshtein) from the Mannheim tournament were interned in Rastatt. In September, four of them (Alekhine, Bogatyrchuk, Saburov, and Koppelman) were freed and allowed, via Switzerland, to return home.

In 1918, Saburov was still in Russia, but because of Bolshevik policy, he fled to Switzerland.
