= Ilya Rabinovich =

Russian chess player (1891–1942)

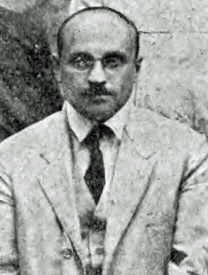
Ilya Rabinovich

Ilya Leontievich Rabinovich (Note: Spelled as "Rabinovitch" or "Rabinowitsch" in some sources) (Russian: Илья Леонтьевич Рабинович; 11 May 1891 – 23 April 1942) was a Russian and later Soviet chess player, among the best in his country for three decades, from 1910 to 1940. His best result was a shared first place in the 9th Soviet Championship of 1934–35. He was also a chess writer.

== Biography ==
Rabinovich was born in Saint Petersburg. In 1911 he tied for first place with Platz in Saint Petersburg. In 1912 he tied for 4th-5th in Vilnius (Hauptturnier; Karel Hromádka won).

=== Interned in Germany ===
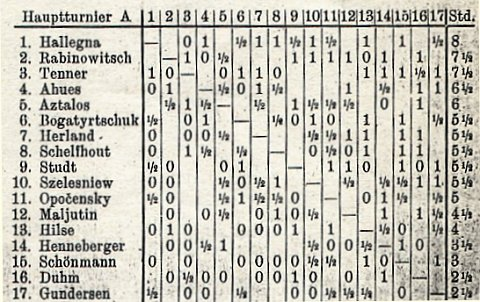
Crosstable of the unfinished Hauptturnier A

In July–August 1914 he played in Mannheim, Germany at the 19th DSB Congress. When the chess congress had to be interrupted upon the outbreak of World War I, Rabinovich was tied for 2nd-3rd places in the Hauptturnier A. After the declaration of war against Russia, eleven players from the Russian Empire (Alexander Alekhine, Efim Bogoljubov, Fedor Bogatyrchuk, Alexander Flamberg, N. Koppelman, Boris Maljutin, Rabinovich, Peter Romanovsky, Peter Petrovich Saburov, Alexey Selezniev, and Samuil Weinstein) from the Mannheim tournament were interned by Germany. In September 1914, four of them (Alekhine, Bogatyrchuk, Saburov, and Koppelman) were freed and allowed, through Switzerland, to return home.

The Russian internees played eight tournaments, the first in Baden-Baden (1914) and all the others in Triberg im Schwarzwald (1914–1917). Rabinovich was 3rd in Baden-Baden (Alexander Flamberg won), 2nd at Triberg 1914/15, 2nd at Triberg 1915, 3rd at Triberg 1915, tied for 2nd-3rd at Triberg 1915, took 2nd at Triberg 1915/16 (all tournaments were won by Bogoljubov). In 1916 Rabinovich won the Triberg chess tournament, and he tied for first with Selezniev at Triberg 1917.

=== Returns to Russia ===
After World War I, Rabinovich returned to St Petersburg (Petrograd, Leningrad). In 1920 he won the Petrograd chess championship, and came fourth in Moscow in the All-Russian Chess Olympiad (later recognized as the first Soviet chess championship), which was won by Alexander Alekhine. In 1922 he took second, behind Grigory Levenfish, in the Petrograd championship. In 1923 he tied for 7th-8th at Leningrad (2nd USSR Championship, won by Peter Romanovsky). In 1923 he won at Novgorod. In 1924 he took 2nd, behind Levenfish, in the Leningrad championship. In 1924 he took 5th in Moscow (3rd USSR Ch., won by Bogoljubov).

In 1925 Rabinovich became the first Soviet player to compete outside the USSR. He played at Baden-Baden and took 7th place. The event was won by Alekhine. In 1925 he tied for 1st-4th in the Leningrad championship. In 1925 he took 3rd at Leningrad (4th USSR Championship, won by Bogoljubov). In 1925 he took 16th in the first Moscow international tournament; Bogoljubow won. In 1926, he won at Leningrad. In 1926 he tied for 2nd-3rd places with Mikhail Botvinnik in the Leningrad Championship, won by Alexander Ilyin-Genevsky.

=== Writer ===
In 1927 Rabinovich wrote the first original book devoted to the endgame in the Russian language, titled The Endgame in Russian and The Russian Endgame Handbook in English. It was updated in 1938. It is said to be a major reason for the dominance of Soviet players in the endgame.

=== Soviet champion ===
In 1927 he tied for 10-12th in Moscow (5th USSR Championship). The event was won by Fedor Bohatirchuk and Peter Romanovsky. In 1928, he won the Leningrad championship. In 1933 he tied for 3rd-5th in Leningrad (8th USSR Championship, won by Botvinnik). In 1934/35 Rabinovich shared first place with Levenfish in Leningrad (9th USSR Championship). At Moscow 1935, the second international tournament, he tied for 11-14th places. The event was won by Botvinnik and Salo Flohr.

In 1937 he tied for 10-12th in Tbilisi (10th USSR Championship; Levenfish won). In 1938, he tied for 3rd-4th in Leningrad (11th USSR Championships semi-final). In January 1939 he tied for 7-8th in Leningrad–Moscow (International Tournament; Flohr won). In 1939 he tied for 11-12th in Leningrad (11th USSR Championship; Botvinnik won). In 1939 he took 7th in the Leningrad championship, won by Georgy Lisitsin. In 1940 he won the Leningrad championship. In June 1941 he played in the interrupted semifinal of the USSR Championship in Rostov-on-Don.

=== Death ===
Rabinovich was taken ill during the Siege of Leningrad. He was evacuated, but died of malnutrition in a hospital in Perm.

== See also ==
- List of Jewish chess players
