= Alexander Flamberg =

Polish chess player (1880–1926)

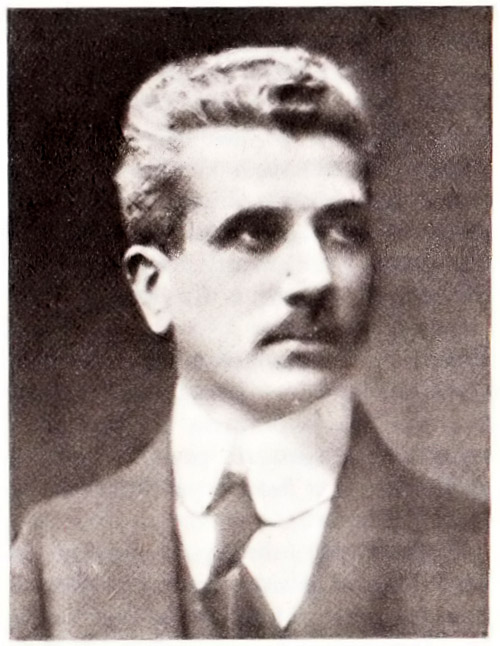

Alexander Flamberg (1880 – 24 January 1926) was a Polish chess master.

== Biography ==
Alexander Davidovich Flamberg was born in 1880 in Warsaw (then Russian Empire. He spent his early years in England, where he learned to play chess. After return to Warsaw, he became one of the strongest Polish chess players. In 1900, he took 2nd, behind Salomon Langleben, in Warsaw. He won the Warsaw championships in 1901 and 1902. Flamberg played his first strong tournament in Łódź (Quadrangular) in 1906, where he took 3rd, behind Akiba Rubinstein and Mikhail Chigorin.

In 1910, he won the Warsaw championship ahead of Rubinstein, but lost a match to him (+0 –4 =1). In 1910, he took 3rd, behind Gersz Rotlewi and Rubinstein, in Warsaw. In 1911, he tied for 2nd-3rd with Gersz Salwe, behind Rubinstein, in Warsaw. In 1911, Flamberg took 2nd, behind Stepan Levitsky, in St Petersburg (All-Russian Amateur Tournament).

In 1912, he tied for 6-7th with Sergey von Freymann in Abbazia (Opatija). The event was won by Rudolf Spielmann. In 1912, he took 2nd, behind Rubinstein, in Warsaw. In 1912, he took 2nd, behind Efim Bogoljubow, in Łódź. In 1912, he took 5th in Vilnius (the 7th All-Russian Masters' Tournament, RUS-ch). The event was won by Rubinstein. In 1913, Flamberg won in Warsaw (Triangular) ahead of Oldřich Duras and Moishe Lowtzky. In 1913, he drew a match with Duras (+1 –1 =0) and won a match against Bogoljubow (+4 –0 =1), both in Warsaw. In 1913/14, he took 3rd, behind Alexander Alekhine and Aron Nimzowitsch, in Sankt Petersburg (the 8th RUS-ch). In 1914, Flamberg won in Kraków (then Austria-Hungary).

In July/August 1914, he took 17th in Mannheim (the 19th DSB Congress, Alekhine won). After the declaration of war against Russia, eleven "Russian" players (Alekhine, Bogoljubow, Bogatyrchuk, Flamberg, Koppelman, Maljutin, Rabinovich, Romanovsky, Saburov, Selesniev, Weinstein) from the interrupted Mannheim tournament were interned by Germany. In September 1914, four of them (Alekhine, Bogatyrchuk, Saburov, and Koppelman) were freed and allowed, through Switzerland, to return home. The Russian internees played eight tournaments, the first in Baden Baden (1914) and all the others in Triberg (1914/15, 1915, 1916, 1917). The tournaments were mostly won by Bogoljubow (five times). The winners were also: Flamberg in 1914, and Ilya Rabinovich in 1916 and 1917 (last one tied with Alexey Selezniev).

Flamberg was allowed to return to Warsaw in 1916 (central Poland under German administration). In 1916, he tied for 4-5th (Rubinstein and Lowtzky won). In 1917, he tied for 3rd-4th (Rubinstein won). In 1919/20, he took 2nd, behind Zdzislaw Belsitzmann, but ahead of Rubinstein. In 1923, he won, ahead of Paulin Frydman, in Warsaw. In 1924, he tied for 1st with Lowtzky in Warsaw. In 1926, Flamberg died relatively young in his native Warsaw.

== See also ==
- List of Jewish chess players
