= Peter Alexandrovich Saburov =

Russian diplomat, official and chess player

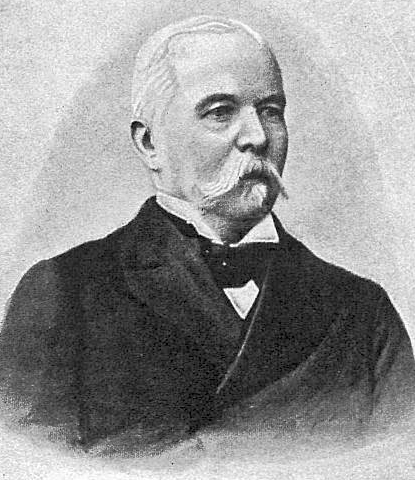
Peter Alexandrovich Saburov.

Peter Alexandrovich Saburov (22 March O.S./3 April 1835 – 28 March O.S./10 April 1918) was a Russian diplomat, collector of ancient Greek sculpture and antiquities, and a strong amateur chess player and patron of chess tournaments, as an honorary President of the St Petersburg Chess Club.

As the Tsarist Russian envoy to Greece, he assembled a collection of Ancient Greek sculpture, Tanagra figurines, painted vases and other Greek antiquities, which, at the end of his subsequent embassy to Berlin from 1879 to 1884, he then sold to the Antikensammlung Berlin, where the collection was catalogued by Adolf Furtwängler, who thereby established his reputation as a master of Greek terracottas, and where it occasioned an acute lack of space that spurred additional construction. Among the prize works was the headless bronze of an Apollo or Dionysus found in the sea off the coast of Salamis. During his retirement in Saint Petersburg, the Hermitage Museum purchased part of the remainder of his collection, about 1909 including 233 molded terracotta statuettes, which he bought in the 1870s when treasure hunters had plundered the necropolis of ancient Tanagra (Boeotia).

Saburov was born on the estate of Veryaevo in the district of Elatma in the Government of Taboff. His brother Andrei held for several years the portfolio of the Minister of Public Instruction. Petr Alexandrovich graduated from the Tsarskoye Selo Lyceum, in 1854, gaining a first gold medal. After employment in the Chancellery (1857–59), he worked in Munich, and then in England, where he stayed for eleven years, moving in upper-class British society. In 1870 he went to Karlsruhe, and subsequently moved on to Athens, where he stayed until 1879. In the summer of 1879 he went to Constantinople, where he was appointed Russian Ambassador, although he never entered upon the official duties. Then he was posted to Berlin from 1880 to 1884, which involved him at the center of the secret negotiations that led to the unpublished pact, the League of the Three Emperors. In 1884 he left the diplomatic service and returned to Saint Petersburg.

During the last decade of the century he became a financial and economic advisor. He listed his pastimes as pomiculture, architecture, the piano and chess. His son Alexander Saburov, the former Civil Governor of St. Petersburg, was arrested by the Bolsheviks in Moscow in 1918 and shot in 1919. In the early stages of the Russian Revolution, Saburov was a senator but was dismissed upon the accession of the Bolsheviks. Following a short illness he died in Petrograd.
