= Karel Hromádka =

Czech chess player

Karel Hromádka in 1936

Position: a8 black rook, b8 black knight, c8 black bishop, d8 black queen, e8 black king, f8 black bishop, h8 black rook, a7 black pawn, b7 black pawn, f7 black pawn, g7 black pawn, h7 black pawn, d6 black pawn, f6 black knight, c5 black pawn, d5 white pawn, e5 black pawn, c4 white pawn, f3 white knight, a2 white pawn, b2 white pawn, e2 white pawn, f2 white pawn, g2 white pawn, h2 white pawn, a1 white rook, b1 white knight, c1 white bishop, d1 white queen, e1 white king, f1 white bishop, h1 white rook

The Hromádka Indian Defense

Karel Hromádka (23 April 1887 in Großweikersdorf, Austria – 16 July 1956) was a Czech chess player, two-time Czech champion, 1913 and 1921 (jointly).

Hromádka played in the 1st unofficial Chess Olympiad, Paris 1924, and scored 6.5/8 for first place in the Consolation Cup. In Qualification Group 1 he finished in third place. Hromádka played in the 1st Chess Olympiad, London 1927, and scored +4 =3 -5. Notably, he also had a plus score against Siegbert Tarrasch (+2 -0 =0).

The name Hromádka Indian Defense is sometimes given to the chess opening 1.d4 Nf6 2.Nf3 c5 3.d5 d6 4.c4 e5, otherwise known as the Czech Benoni or the Old Benoni.
