= Efim Bogoljubow =

Russian-German chess grandmaster (1889–1952)

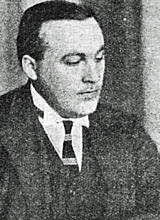
- Bogoljubow in 1925

Personal information
- Born: Yefim Dmitriyevich Bogolyubov; April 14, 1889 Stanislavchik, Tarashcha Uyezd, Kiev Governorate, Russian Empire
- Died: June 18, 1952 (aged 63) Triberg im Schwarzwald, West Germany

Chess career
- Country: Russian Empire → Soviet Union (Note: He represented Russian Empire until 1917; and Soviet Union from 1924 to 1925.); German Reich → West Germany (Note: He represented German Reich from 1919 to 1924 and again from 1926 to 1933; Nazi Germany from 1933 to 1945; and West Germany from 1945 to 1952 (his death).)
- Title: Grandmaster (1951)

Efim Dimitrijewitsch Bogoljubow (Note: /ˌboʊɡɒlˈjuːboʊ/ or /ˌboʊɡɒlˈjuːbɒv/) (Note: Russian: Ефим Дмитриевич Боголю́бов, IPA: [bəɡɐˈlʲubəf]; also romanized as Bogoljubov and Bogolyubov; Ukrainian: Юхим Дмитрович Боголюбов, romanized: Yukhym Dmytrovych Boholiubov.) (April 14, 1889 – June 18, 1952) was a Russian-born German chess grandmaster.

== Early career ==
Bogoljubow learned how to play chess at 15 years old, and developed a serious interest at the age of 18. His father was a priest. Originally he wanted to become a priest too, and studied theology in Kiev, but he decided otherwise and enrolled in the Polytechnical Institute to study agriculture. He did not finish his studies and instead focused on chess.

In 1911, Bogoljubow tied for first place in the Kiev championships, and finished 9–10th in the Saint Petersburg (All-Russian Amateur) Tournament, won by Stepan Levitsky. In 1912, he took second place, behind Karel Hromádka, in Vilna (Vilnius) (Hauptturnier). In 1913/14, Bogoljubow finished eighth in Saint Petersburg (All Russian Masters' Tournament – eighth Russian championship; Alexander Alekhine and Aron Nimzowitsch came joint first).

== World War I: Interned in Germany ==
In July/August 1914, Bogoljubow played in the Mannheim tournament (the 19th DSB Congress), and tied for 8–9th in that event, which was interrupted by World War I. After the declaration of war against Russia, eleven "Russian players" (Alekhine, Bogoljubow, Fedor Bogatyrchuk, Alexander Flamberg, N. Koppelman, Boris Maliutin, Ilya Rabinovich, Peter Romanovsky, Peter Petrovich Saburov, Alexey Selezniev, Samuil Weinstein) from the Mannheim tournament were interned by Germany. In September 1914, four of the internees (Alekhine, Bogatyrchuk, Saburov, and Koppelman) were allowed to return home via Switzerland. The remaining Russian internees played eight tournaments, the first held in Baden-Baden (1914) and all the others in Triberg im Schwarzwald (1914–1917). Bogoljubow took second place (behind Alexander Flamberg) in Baden-Baden, and won five times in Triberg (1914–1916). During this time he met Frieda Kaltenbach, daughter of a schoolteacher. They married in 1920 and had two daughters. Bogoljubow spent most of the rest of his life in Germany.

== Successes and world championship matches ==
Bogoljubow

After the war, Bogoljubow won many international tournaments; at Berlin 1919, Stockholm 1919, Kiel 1921, and Pistyan (Pieštany) 1922. He tied for 1st–3rd at Karlsbad (Karlovy Vary) 1923. He sent his winnings from Pistyan to Triberg, where his wife used them to buy a house. The Bogoljubows made an income by renting rooms to tourists and visitors.

In 1924, Bogoljubow briefly returned to Russia, which had since become the Soviet Union, and won consecutive Soviet championships in 1924 and 1925. He also won at Breslau (Wrocław) 1925, and in Moscow, ahead of a field which included Emanuel Lasker and José Raúl Capablanca. This made him the only player to ever become both German and Soviet champion in the same year.

In the Soviet Union, Bogoljubow was not allowed to play tournaments without permission from Nikolai Krylenko. Thus in 1926, Bogoljubow emigrated to Germany, and thereafter became a "non-person" in the Soviet Union: mention of his name was forbidden. He won ahead of Akiba Rubinstein that year at Berlin. At the Bad Kissingen 1928 chess tournament, Bogoljubow triumphed (+6−1=4) over a field which included Capablanca, Nimzowitsch and Savielly Tartakower. Bogoljubow won two matches against Max Euwe (both 5½–4½) in 1928 and 1928/29 in the Netherlands. He played matches for the World Chess Championship twice against Alekhine, losing 15½–9½ in 1929, and 15½–10½ in 1934.

Bogoljubow represented Germany at first board in the 4th Chess Olympiad at Prague 1931, winning the individual silver medal (+9−1=7).

In 1930, Bogoljubow twice tied for 2nd–3rd with Nimzowitsch, after Alekhine, in Sanremo; then with Gösta Stoltz, behind Isaac Kashdan, in Stockholm. In 1931, he tied for 1st–2nd in Swinemünde (27th DSB Congress). In 1933, Bogoljubow won in Bad Pyrmont (1st GER-ch). In 1935, he won at Bad Nauheim, and Bad Saarow. Bogoljubow tied for 1st–2nd at Berlin 1935, Bad Elster 1936, Bad Elster 1937. Bogoljubow won at Bremen 1937, Bad Elster 1938, and Stuttgart 1939 (the 1st Europaturnier).

When the Nazis came to power in 1933, Bogoljubow was no longer allowed to play for the German national team or in German championships. His situation was not helped even after he joined the Nazi party in 1938, so that his daughters would be allowed to study at university. Nonetheless, he coached the German national team for the 1936 (unofficial) and 1939 Chess Olympiads.

Accounts of Bogoljubow's opinion of the Nazis differ between sources. Hans Kmoch claims that he insisted to play with the swastika flag at Zandvoort 1936, but Fedor Bogatyrchuk claimed that he did not like to wear it, and that Bogoljubow was "only formally" a member of the Nazi party. Bogatyrchuk is quoted by Bogoljubow's biographer, Sergei Soloviov, as saying: "It was not a secret at all that E.D. [Bogoljubow] did not like the Bolsheviks, but I think only a few people knew that he was treating Hitler's wild ideas with at least equal revulsion and contempt."

== World War II and after ==
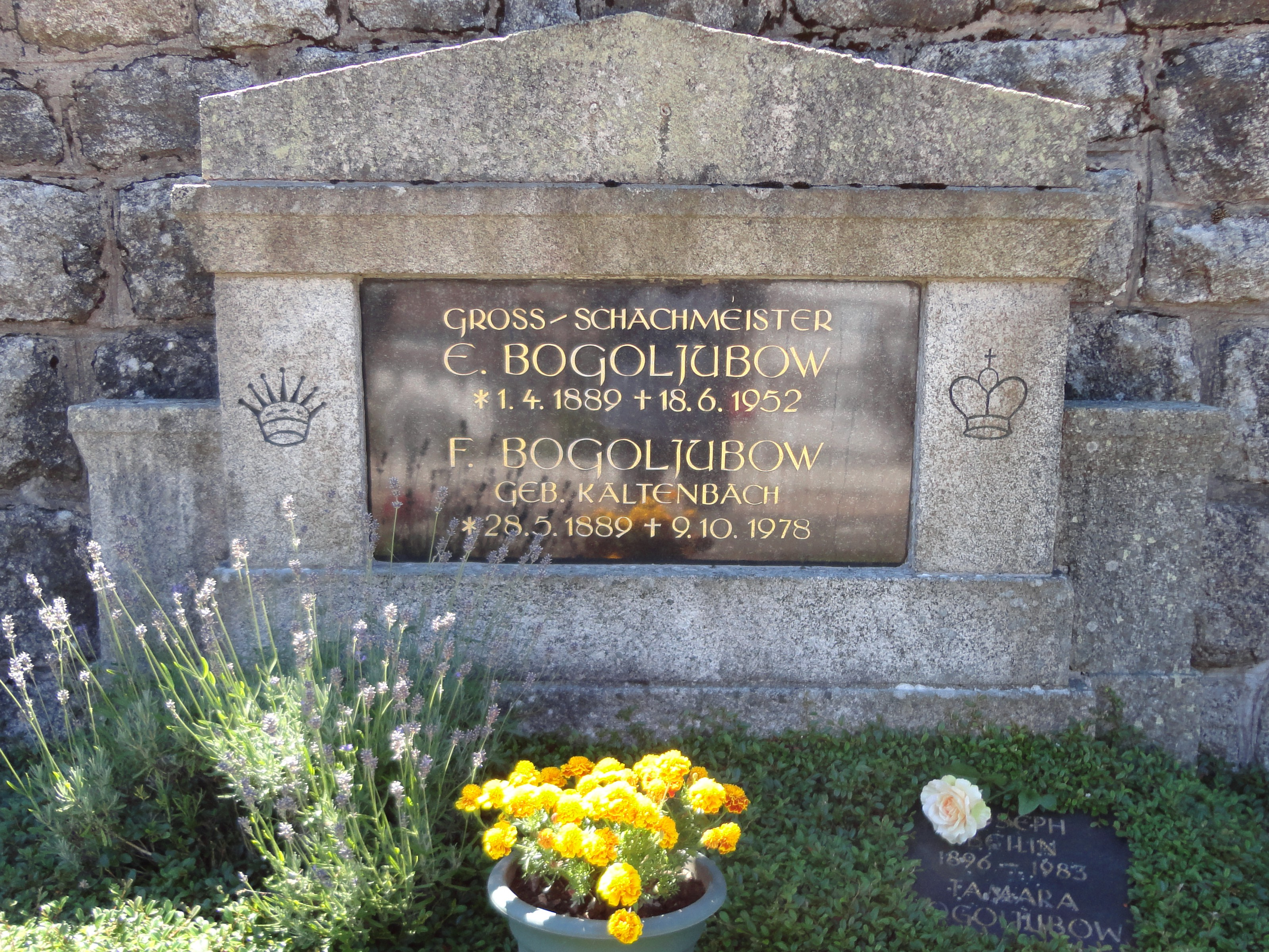
Efim Bogoljubow's grave at Triberg

Hans Frank, who enjoyed meeting top players and playing consultation games against them, invited Bogoljubow to move to Krakow to work as a chess player and translator. During World War II, Bogoljubow lost a match to Euwe (+2−5=3) at Krefeld 1941, and drew a mini-match with Alekhine (+2−2=0) at Warsaw 1943. He also played in numerous tournaments held in Germany and the General Government throughout the war. In 1940, Bogoljubow won in Berlin, and tied for 1st–2nd with Anton Kohler in Kraków/Krynica/Warsaw (the 1st GG-ch). In 1941, he took fourth in Munich (the second Europaturnier; Stoltz won), and finished third, behind Alekhine and Paul Felix Schmidt, in Kraków/Warsaw (the 2nd GG-ch). In 1942, Bogoljubow finished fifth in Salzburg Grandmasters' tournament (Alekhine won), tied for third–fifth in Munich (1st European Championship – Europameisterschaft; Alekhine won), took third in Warsaw/Lublin/Kraków (the 3rd GG-ch; Alekhine won). In 1943, he took fourth in Salzburg (Paul Keres and Alekhine won), and tied for second–third in Krynica (the 4th GG-ch; Josef Lokvenc won). In 1944, Bogoljubow won, ahead of Fedor Bogatyrchuk, in Radom (the 5th GG-ch). Bogoljubow trained Klaus Junge, Wolfgang Unzicker, and Klaus Darga.

After the war, Bogoljubow lived in West Germany, and was once again allowed to play in German championships. While his level of play had declined significantly by this time, nevertheless, in 1947, he won in Lüneburg, and Kassel. In 1949, Bogoljubow won in Bad Pyrmont (third West GER-ch), and tied for first–second with Elmārs Zemgalis in Oldenburg. In 1951, he won in Augsburg, and Saarbrücken.

The World Chess Federation (FIDE) did not award Bogoljubow the title International Grandmaster in 1950, as he was then considered politically compromised: pressure from the Soviet chess federation played a part in this decision. However, following protests from Western chess representatives, FIDE awarded him the title in 1951.

Bogoljubow died in his sleep in 1952, aged 63. He was posthumously rehabilitated in the Soviet Union after the beginning of perestroika.

== Legacy ==
The opening known as the Bogo-Indian Defence (1.d4 Nf6 2.c4 e6 3.Nf3 Bb4+) is named after Bogoljubow.

== Quotations ==
- "When I am White I win because I am White. When I am Black I win because I am Bogoljubow."
- "To have a knight planted in your game at K6 (e3/e6) is worse than a rusty nail in your knee."
