= Fedir Bohatyrchuk =

Ukrainian chess player (1892–1984)

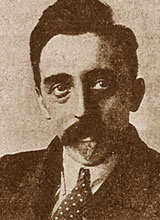
- Bohatyrchuk in 1923

Personal information
- Born: Fedir Parfenovych Bohatyrchuk; 27 November 1892 Kiev, Russian Empire (now Kyiv, Ukraine)
- Died: 4 September 1984 (aged 91) Ottawa, Canada

Chess career
- Country: Russian Empire → Soviet Union (1922–1944); Canada (from 1949)
- Title: International Master (1954); International Master of Correspondence Chess (1967)

Fedir Parfenovych Bohatyrchuk (Note: also Bogatirchuk, Bohatirchuk, Bogatyrtschuk; Ukrainian: Федір Парфенович Богатирчук; Russian: Фёдор Парфеньевич Богатырчук, romanized: Fyodor Parfenyevich Bogatyrchuk) (27 November 1892 – 4 September 1984) was a Ukrainian-Canadian chess player, doctor of medicine (radiologist), political activist, Kiev city councillor, university professor, and writer.

== Russian, Ukrainian and Soviet chess ==
=== Early chess, trained by Chigorin ===
As a youth, Bohatyrchuk sometimes traveled to chess tournaments with the great player Mikhail Chigorin (1850–1908), who had in 1892 narrowly lost a match for the World Championship to Wilhelm Steinitz. Chigorin trained the young player, and influenced his style and openings.

In 1911, Bohatyrchuk won the Kiev City Championship; he was followed by Stefan Izbinsky, Efim Bogoljubow, et al. In 1912, he placed third in the All-Russian Championship. In February 1914, Bohatyrchuk lost an exhibition game against José Raúl Capablanca at Kiev. In 1914, he took third at Kiev.

=== Interned at Mannheim ===
In July/August 1914, Bohatyrchuk tied for 6th–10th at Mannheim (the 19th DSB Congress, Hauptturnier A, or Group II at the event; his group was set for a 17-player round-robin). He scored 5.5/10, with six of his games from the schedule not played, due to the outbreak of World War I. He was part of a group, along with ten other Russian players from the interrupted Mannheim tournament, which was interned by Germany after the declaration of war against Russia, which began World War I. In September 1914, Bohatyrchuk and three others (Alexander Alekhine, Peter Petrovich Saburov, and N. Koppelman) were freed and allowed to return home. Some writers have asserted that Alekhine used his family's influence to arrange this; his wealthy father was a member of the Duma of Czar Nicholas II at this time. En route back to Russia, via Switzerland, Bohatyrchuk and Alekhine spent nearly a month in Genoa, Italy, while waiting for transportation to arrive, playing over one hundred games against each other. Bohatyrchuk later stated that "The enforced stay in Genoa undoubtedly did more for my chess development than the games in subsequent years with ordinary opponents."

=== Competes in six Soviet championships ===
Bohatyrchuk played in six USSR Chess Championships: 1923, 1924, 1927, 1931, 1933, and 1934.

In July 1923, Bohatyrchuk tied for third–fifth at Petrograd (St Petersburg, Leningrad) in the 2nd USSR Championship. In 1924, he took second, behind Yakov Vilner, at Kiev in the 1st Ukrainian Chess Championship. In August–September 1924, Bohatyrchuk tied for third and fourth places at Moscow in the 3rd USSR Championship.

In December 1925, Bohatyrchuk finished 11th of 21 players at Moscow (the first Soviet-organized International Tournament). The event was won by Efim Bogoljubow, followed by Emanuel Lasker, José Raúl Capablanca, Frank Marshall, et al. This was the first Soviet government-sponsored tournament, and had 11 of the world's top 16 players, based on ratings from chessmetrics.com, making it one of the greatest events in chess history. Bohatyrchuk achieved a 2628 performance, according to the Chessmetrics website, which calculates historical ratings. This was his peak career ranking, at #15 in the world.

=== Author, Soviet champion 1927 ===
In 1926, Bohatyrchuk wrote the first chess book Шахи (Szachy, Shakhy, Chess) in Ukrainian. In 1927, he won at Kiev. In October 1927, Bohatyrchuk tied for first and second places with Peter Romanovsky at Moscow, 5th USSR Championship, with (+10−1=9), losing only to Romanovsky in the 21-player field. In 1929, he won at Kiev.

In November 1931, Bohatyrchuk tied for third through sixth at Moscow (7th USSR Ch.), with 10/17, as Mikhail Botvinnik won. In 1933, he won at Moscow (Quadrangular), with 4½/6. In September 1933, Bohatyrchuk took eighth at Leningrad (8th USSR Ch.), with 10½/19, as Botvinnik won again. In December 1934 /January 1935, he tied for third and fourth places at Leningrad (9th USSR Ch.), with 11½/19, one-half point behind joint winners Grigory Levenfish and Ilya Rabinovich. During the mid-1930s, the Soviet Chess Federation requested that Bohatyrchuk play more frequently in top events, but he often declined, due to his professional career obligations. He could usually only get away from Kiev for an extended period once a year.

=== Success against Botvinnik ===
In March 1935, Bohatyrchuk tied for 16th–17th places at Moscow 1935 chess tournament (the second Soviet-organized International Tournament), with 8/19. The event, which had eight of the world's top 18 players, according to Chessmetrics, was won by Botvinnik and Salo Flohr, but Bohatyrchuk beat Mikhail Botvinnik in their individual game. Bohatyrchuk has mentioned in his autobiography (printed in Russian in San Francisco in 1978) that just after this game, the head of the Soviet Chess Federation, Minister of Justice Nikolai Krylenko, approached him and said: "You will never beat Botvinnik again!" That would indeed prove the case, as Bohatyrchuk never played Botvinnik again, leaving him with a lifetime score of (+3−0=1) against Botvinnik, who was, however, nearly 20 years younger. Note that the book Botvinnik's Selected Games 1947–1970 lists Bohatyrchuk's record against Botvinnik as (+3−0=2).

=== Late 1930s chess results, 1937 Ukrainian champion ===
In March 1936, Bohatyrchuk took third at Kiev (8th Ukrainian Chess Championship), with 11½/17. In July 1937, he won at Kiev (the 9th Ukrainian Chess Championship), with 12½/17. In 1938, Bohatyrchuk took second at Kiev (USSR Ch. semi-final), with 11/17, behind only winner Vasily Panov, but he did not continue on to play at the 11th USSR Championship in 1939, although having qualified for that event, citing career obligations.

== High school, family, medical education, and military service ==
Bohatyrchuk completed his high school studies in 1912. He entered the University of Kiev (now University of Kyiv) that year to study medicine, and served in the Russian military, medical corps, during World War I.

Bohatyrchuk had married Olga Zykina (1892–1990) by 1915; the couple had one daughter, Dr. Tamara Jeletzky (1917–1998).

Bohatyrchuk eventually graduated as a professional radiologist, which at that time was an emerging specialty; he completed his habilitation in 1940.

During the Russian Civil War, 1917–1922, Bohatyrchuk was employed by a military hospital, and was a professor of anatomy at the Institute of Physical Education and Sport in Kiev.

== Collaboration with the anti-communist Russian forces during World War II ==
As a radiologist, Bohatyrchuk was seconded to a German medical research facility when Kiev fell to the Wehrmacht in September 1941.

He served on Kiev City Council during the war.

During World War II, he was a head of the Ukrainian Red Cross, and of the Institute of Experimental Medicine. While working with the Red Cross, Bohatyrchuk did much to help the Soviet prisoners of war kept in the German camps in extremely harsh conditions. These activities irritated the Germans, and in February 1942 Bohatyrchuk was arrested and spent about one month in a Gestapo detention centre in Kiev. There also exists information that, while working at the Institute of Experimental Medicine, Bohatyrchuk provided a cover to a Jewish female employee (a sister of the Kiev master Boris Ratner), thereby saving her from execution or deportation to a concentration camp.

When the Soviet forces counterattacked and moved into Kiev, Bohatyrchuk, together with his family, migrated to Kraków, then to Prague, in 1944. There he joined the Committee for the Liberation of the Peoples of Russia, an anti-communist, collaborationist militia headed by the Russian general Andrey Vlasov. Bohatyrchuk signed the Prague Manifesto, and became viewed by the Soviet authorities as a Nazi collaborator. Bohatyrchuk was also the leader of the Ukrainian National Council (Ukrainśka Narodna Rada).

As a result of these activities, which were viewed by the Soviets as treason, Bohatyrchuk became the number one "persona non-grata" in Soviet chess until the defection of Viktor Korchnoi in 1976. The Soviets removed many of his games from their official records, but many of them were later reclaimed using outside sources.

== Chess in Nazi-occupied Europe and American Zone of Occupation ==
In February 1944, Bohatyrchuk took second, with 8/9, behind Efim Bogoljubow, at Radom, Poland (the 5th General Government chess tournament). In spring 1944, he drew a match against Stepan Popel at Kraków (2 : 2). In May 1944, in Prague, Bohatyrchuk played an eight-game clock simultaneous training series against local masters, including Čeněk Kottnauer, Luděk Pachman, Jiri Podgorný, and Karel Průcha, scoring an overall (+7−0=1).

At the end of World War II, as the German armies were retreating, Bohatyrchuk moved on to a number of German cities, including Berlin and Potsdam, and finally ended up in the American-controlled city of Bayreuth in May 1945, as the European war drew to a close. For a time he lived in Munich, playing in German chess events under the disguised name of 'Bogenko', so as to avoid repatriation to the USSR. In March 1946, Bohatyrchuk won a 14-player round-robin for displaced persons, staged in the Allied camp at Meerbeck, Lower Saxony, Germany. He scored 11/13, with (+10−1=2); second was Lūcijs Endzelīns with 10½, while third was Romanas Arlauskas with 10. Later in 1946, Bohatyrchuk won, followed by Elmārs Zemgalis, Wolfgang Unzicker, etc. at Regensburg (Klaus Junge Memorial), with 7/9. In February 1947, he took third at Kirchheim unter Teck. In May 1947, Bohatyrchuk placed sixth at Kassel, a ten-player international round-robin, won by Bogoljubow. In September 1947, he took fourth at Stuttgart, his last event before departing for Canada.

== Settles in Canada ==
=== Professor of medicine ===
Bohatyrchuk emigrated to Canada in 1948, where he settled in the capital city of Ottawa. He became a professor of medicine at the University of Ottawa, and the author of many scientific studies.

Bohatyrchuk received the Barclay Medal in 1955 from the British Radiological Society. From 1960, he was an honorary member of the Canadian Radiological Society.

=== Political activist, writer ===
Bohatyrchuk, writing in 1949 from Canada a letter to the British magazine Chess, was one of the first to describe the Soviet state's methods of high salaries and luxury benefits for promising and talented sportspeople, including chess players, along with intensive training, as part of an overall program to demonstrate the superiority of the communist system. The Soviets were maintaining that their top chess players, including the new world champion Botvinnik, were amateurs, in contrast to the chess professionals elsewhere in the world. His letter generated significant interest and controversy throughout the chess world at the time, including many replies from worldwide chess figures such as Robert G. Wade and Luděk Pachman. Bohatyrchuk certainly won no friends in Soviet chess leadership with this activism, which shone undesired attention on their practices, while providing expert direct contradiction.

Bohatyrchuk also wrote historical and recollection books. At the congress of the Ukrainian federalists in Niagara Falls in 1952, he was elected Chairman of the Association of the Ukrainian Federalist Democrats, and chief editor of the press organs "Skhidnyak" and the "Federalist Democrat". He was the author of many newspaper and periodical articles on the history of ODNR (Liberation Movement of Peoples of Russia). He wrote his autobiography: "My Life Path to Vlasov and Manifesto of Prague" (published in San Francisco, 1978) (in Russian: Мой жизненный путь к Власову и Пражскому Манифесту, Moy zhiznennyi put' k Vlasovu i Prazhskomu Manifestu).

== Canadian chess ==
=== Competes in three Canadian championships, 1954 Olympiad ===
Bohatyrchuk played in three Closed Canadian Chess Championships. In 1949, he took second at Arvida (winner was Maurice Fox), with 7/9, ahead of Daniel Yanofsky, Frank Anderson, and Povilas Vaitonis. In 1951, he tied for third and fourth places at Vancouver (winner was Povilas Vaitonis), with 8½/12. In 1955, Bohatyrchuk tied for third through fifth at Ottawa (the winner was Frank Anderson, ahead of Yanofsky).

Bohatyrchuk, in his 62nd year, also represented Canada at the 11th Chess Olympiad at Amsterdam 1954, playing board four (+7−5=3).

=== International Master ===
In 1954, FIDE granted Bohatyrchuk the title of International Master. His earlier achievements, particularly in USSR Championships, may have been sufficient for the higher Grandmaster title, but the Soviets blocked this for political reasons.

=== Canadian Correspondence champion, International Correspondence Master ===
Bohatyrchuk took up Correspondence chess in his late sixties, becoming Canadian Correspondence Chess Champion (1963, 1964) and playing first board for Canada at the Correspondence Chess Olympiad (1962–1965). In 1967, he was awarded the title of ICCF International Master, and was the top-rated correspondence player in Canada at the end of 1967, at age 75.

Bohatyrchuk stayed active in local Ottawa over-the-board chess into his early eighties, and played correspondence chess until age 85.

While living in Ottawa, Bohatyrchuk helped to train the young Lawrence Day (born 1949), who himself became a FIDE International Master in 1972, and who went on to represent Canada a national record 13 times at Chess Olympiads. Day's chess style has been influenced significantly by Bohatyrchuk.

== Chess legacy ==
Former world champion, GM Boris Spassky, stated in 2017, after reviewing Bohatyrchuk's games, that "if Bohatyrchuk plays chess professionally, he could be the first Soviet world champion."

Bohatyrchuk, born in 1892, belonged to the same Russian chess generation as Alexander Alekhine (born 1892), Efim Bogoljubow (born 1889), Pyotr Romanovsky (born 1892), Grigory Levenfish (born 1889), Ilya Rabinovich (born 1891), and Boris Verlinsky (born 1888); this group was beginning to rise to prominence prior to the Russian Revolution of 1917.

Except for the ill-fated Mannheim 1914 event, Bohatyrchuk did not have the opportunity to compete in an international tournament outside Russia or the Soviet Union until near the end of World War II, and even those events came while he was a fugitive from the Soviets.

He was inducted into the Canadian Chess Hall of Fame in 2011.

Russian chess author Sergey Voronkov published, in 2017 in Prague, publisher Russkiya tradicia, a two-volume set of books covering Bohatyrchuk. Volume one is in Russian, a translated reprint of his 1978 book, published in San Francisco, entitled Moi zhiznenny put k Vlasovu i Prazhskomu manifestu (Translation from the Russian to English: "My living route to Vlasov and Prague Manifesto"). Volume two, also in Russian, covers the games of Bohatyrchuk, collected from all available contemporary sources.

== Alleged role model for Dr. Zhivago ==
Biography author Sergey Voronkov and Lawrence Day, Canadian chess master and pupil of Bohatyrchuk, have argued that Bohatyrchuk served as a role model for the fictional Dr. Zhivago, as depicted in the novel of that title by Boris Pasternak, and in the 1965 Academy Award-winning film Dr. Zhivago, based on the novel. However, further evidence is required to confirm or refute this hypothesis.

== Death ==
Bohatyrchuk died in 1984 at age 91, and is buried in Pinecrest Cemetery in Ottawa, together with his wife Olga, who died in 1990.

== Notable games ==
- Alexander Ilyin-Zhenevsky vs. Fedor Parfenovich Bohatirchuk, Moscow 1924, 3rd USSR ch, Ruy Lopez, Old Steinitz Defense, C62, 0–1
- Fedor Parfenovich Bohatirchuk vs. Mikhail Botvinnik, Moscow 1927, 5th USSR ch, French Defense, Winawer Advance Variation, C17, 1–0
- Fedor Parfenovich Bohatirchuk vs. Mikhail Botvinnik, Leningrad 1933, 8th USSR ch, Sicilian, Dragon, B72, 1–0
- Vsevolod Rauzer vs. Fedor Parfenovich Bohatirchuk, Leningrad 1934, 9th USSR ch, Ruy Lopez, Modern Steinitz Defense, Fianchetto Variation, C76, 0–1
- Fedor Parfenovich Bohatirchuk vs. Mikhail Botvinnik, Moscow 1935, 2nd it, Four Knights, C49, 1–0
- Ludek Pachman vs. Fedor Bohatirchuk, Prague 1944, Sicilian Defense, B95, 0–1
- Elmars Zemgalis vs. Fedor Parfenovich Bohatirchuk, Regensburg 1946, Klaus Junge Memorial, English, A21, 0–1
- Povilas Vaitonis vs. Fedor Parfenovich Bohatirchuk, Canadian Championship, Arvida 1949, CAN-ch, Grünfeld Defense, D93, 0–1
- Fedor Parfenovich Bohatirchuk vs. Frank Ross Anderson, Canadian Championship, Vancouver 1951, CAN-ch, Bird's Opening, A03, 1–0
- Fedor Parfenovich Bohatirchuk vs. Federico Norcia, Amsterdam 1954, 11th Olympiad, Ruy Lopez, Classical, C64, 1–0

== See also ==
- List of Eastern Bloc defectors
