= Richard Teichmann =

German chess player (1868–1925)

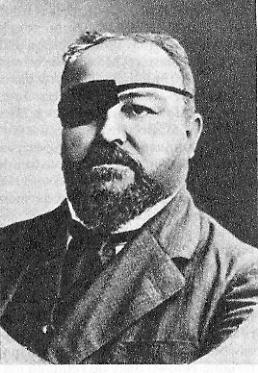
- Teichmann c. 1900–1910

Personal information
- Born: 24 December 1868 Lehnitzsch bei Altenburg, Duchy of Saxe-Altenburg, North German Confederation
- Died: 15 June 1925 (aged 56) Berlin, Province of Brandenburg, Free State of Prussia, Germany

Chess career
- Country: Germany

Richard Teichmann (24 December 1868 – 15 June 1925) was a German chess master and a chess composer. He was known as "Richard the Fifth" because he often finished in fifth place in tournaments. But in 1911 he scored a convincing win in Karlsbad, crushing Akiba Rubinstein and Carl Schlechter with the same line of the Ruy Lopez. José Raúl Capablanca called him "one of the finest players in the world". Edward Lasker recounted the witty way in which Teichmann demonstrated the Schlechter win in his book Chess Secrets I learned from the Masters, and generally admired Teichmann's mastery.

Throughout his chess career Teichmann was handicapped by chronic eye trouble. He had only one eye, and eye trouble caused him to withdraw from the 1899 London Tournament after only four rounds.

== Game record ==
Teichmann had an almost even score against Alexander Alekhine overall (+3–4=4), drawing a match in 1921 (+2–2=2) when Alekhine was regarded as a world title challenger to José Raúl Capablanca. He even won as Black against Alekhine in this match at Berlin 1921:

1.e4 e5 2.Nf3 Nc6 3.Bb5 a6 4.Bxc6 dxc6 5.Nc3 f6 6.d4 exd4 7.Qxd4 Qxd4 8.Nxd4 Bd6 9.Nde2 Ne7 10.Bf4 Be6 11.Bxd6 cxd6 12.0-0-0 0-0-0 13.Rhe1 Bf7 14.Nd4 Rhe8 15.f3 Kc7 16.a4 b5 17.axb5 axb5 18.b4 Nc8 19.Nf5 g6 20.Ne3 Nb6 21.Kb2 d5 22.Rd4 f5 23.Ra1 Nc8 24.g4 dxe4 25.Rxd8 Kxd8 26.fxe4 f4 27.Rd1+ Kc7 28.Rf1 g5 29.Nf5 Nd6 30.Ra1 Nc4+ 31.Kc1 Kb6 32.Nd4 h5 33.gxh5 Bxh5 34.Nb3 f3 35.Nd2 Ne3 36.Ra3 f2 37.Na4+ bxa4 38.Rxe3 Rd8 0–1

They played a seventh tiebreaker game to determine the match winner, a French Defense Alekhine won with the black pieces.

Teichmann's records against Emanuel Lasker and Capablanca were poor (+0−4=0 and +0−2=1); however, he scored wins against all the other leading players of his day, e.g. Carl Schlechter (+4−2=21), Frank Marshall (+7−7=17), Aron Nimzowitsch (+1−1=5), Siegbert Tarrasch (+5−7=2), Akiba Rubinstein (+5−6=11), Géza Maróczy (+1−2=12) and David Janowski (+4−5=4).

== Chess is 99% Tactics ==
Today Richard Teichmann is most commonly attributed as the author of the quotation "Chess is 99% tactics," which does not appear in any of his publications. It appears that it was said by him in a private conversation with the Swiss chess master Erwin Voellmy, who later published a series of books on tactics and wrote in one of the volumes: ‘...the great master and teacher Teichmann explained to me years ago in Zürich (although he slightly exaggerated): “To 99% chess consists of tactics”.’
