= Siegbert Tarrasch =

German chess player (1862–1934)

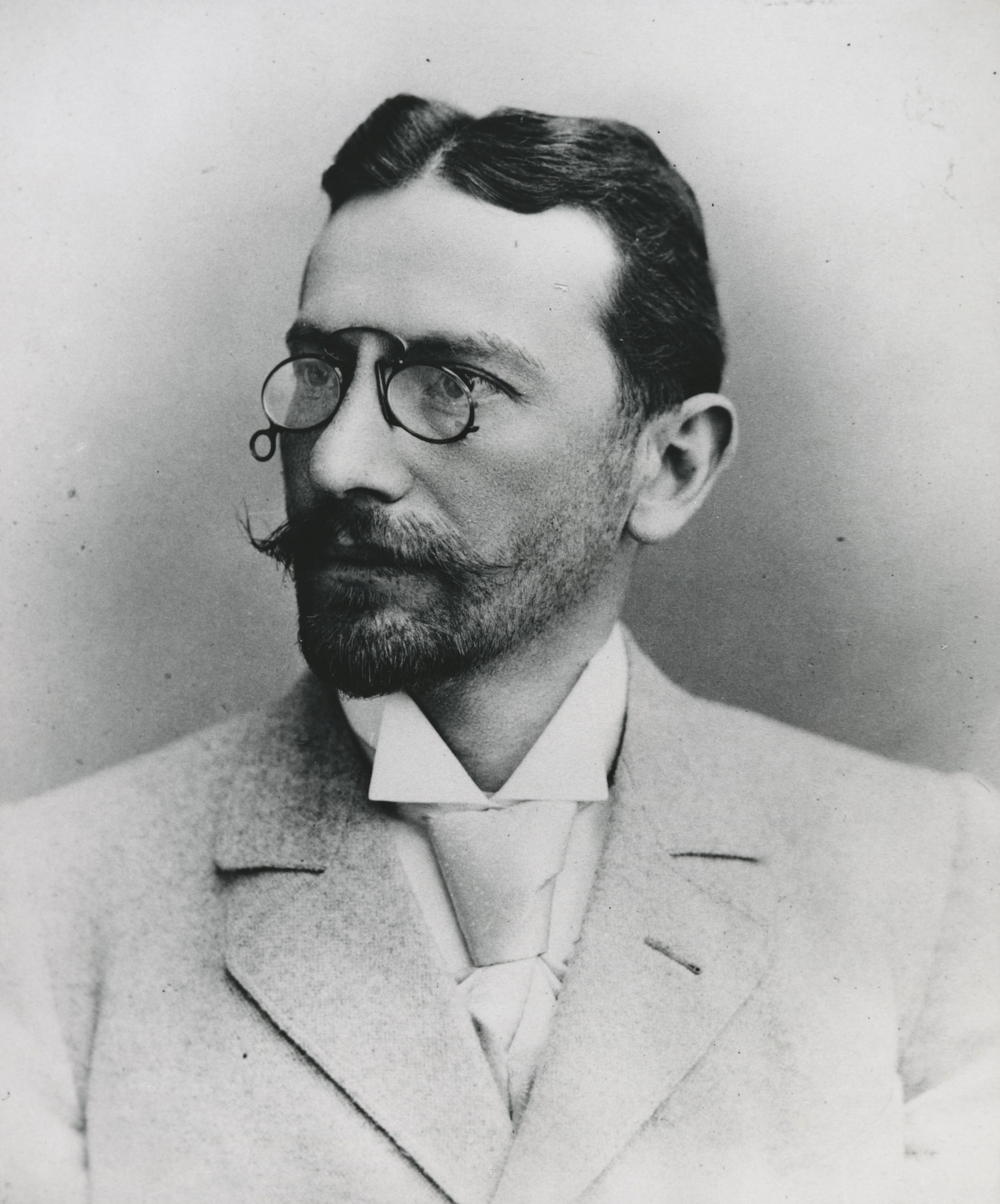
- Tarrasch, c. 1900

Personal information
- Born: 5 March 1862 Breslau, Kingdom of Prussia (now Wrocław, Poland)
- Died: 17 February 1934 (aged 71) Munich, Germany

Chess career
- Country: Prussia → Germany

Siegbert Tarrasch (German pronunciation: [ˈziːɡbɐt ˈtaraʃ]; 5 March 1862 – 17 February 1934) was a German chess player, considered to have been among the strongest players and most influential theoreticians of the late 19th and early 20th century.

== Life ==
Tarrasch was born in Breslau, in what was then Prussian Silesia and now is Poland. Having finished school in 1880, he left Breslau to study medicine in Berlin and then in Halle. With his family, he settled in Nuremberg, Bavaria, and later in Munich, setting up a successful medical practice. He had five children. Tarrasch was Jewish, converted to Christianity in 1909, and was a patriotic German who lost a son in World War I, yet he faced antisemitism in the early stages of the Third Reich.

== Chess career ==
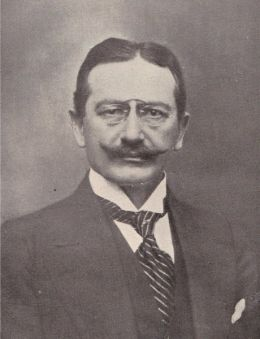
Siegbert Tarrasch

A medical doctor by profession, Tarrasch may have been the best player in the world in the early 1890s. He scored heavily against the ageing World Champion Wilhelm Steinitz in tournaments (+3−0=1) but refused an opportunity to challenge Steinitz for the world title in 1892 because of the demands of his medical practice.

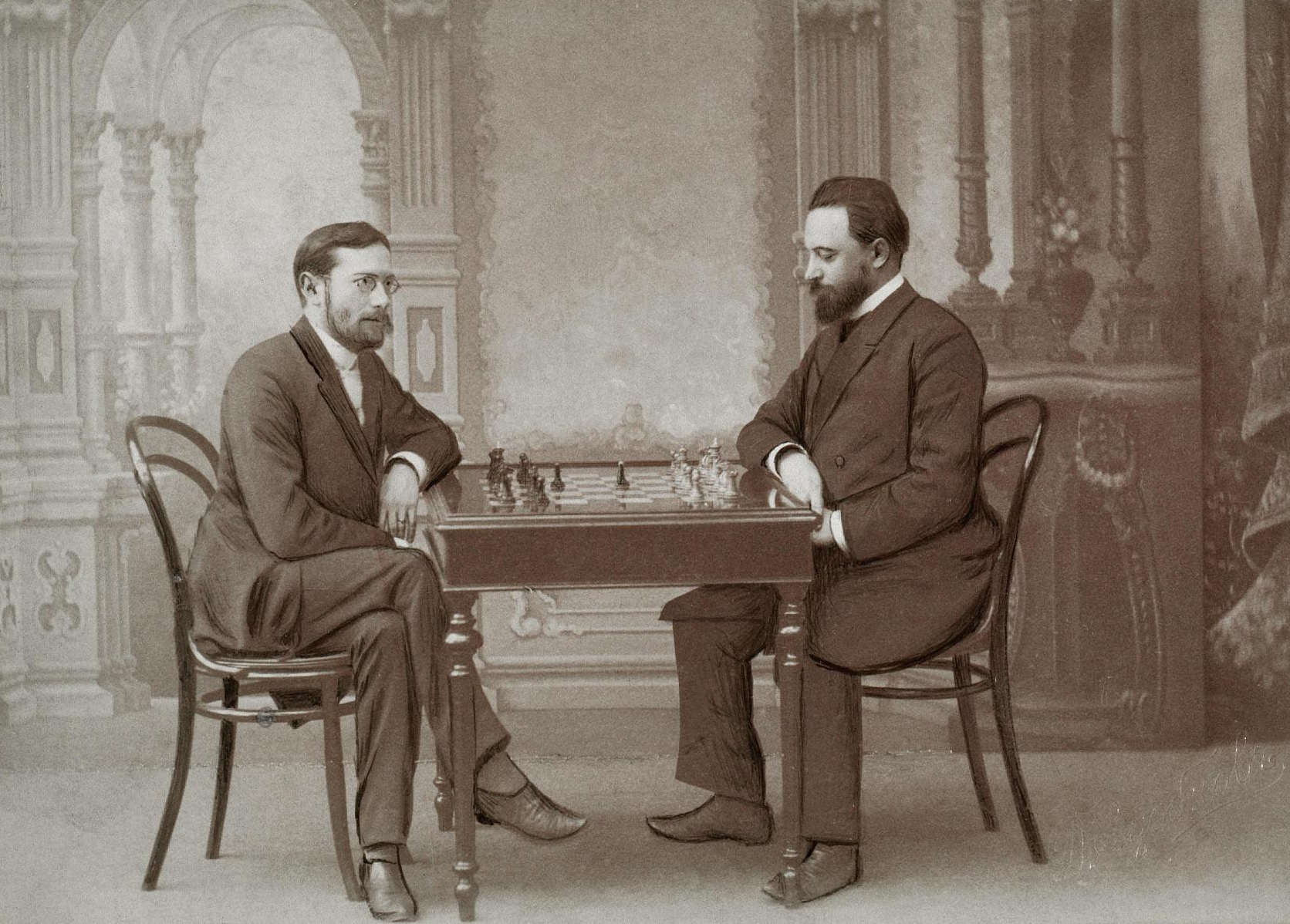
Tarrasch and Mikhail Chigorin in Saint Petersburg, 1893

Soon afterwards, in St. Petersburg in 1893, Tarrasch drew a hard-fought match against Steinitz's challenger Mikhail Chigorin (+9−9=4) after leading most of the way. He also won four major tournaments in succession: Breslau 1889, Manchester 1890, Dresden 1892, and Leipzig 1894.

However, after Emanuel Lasker became world chess champion in 1894, Tarrasch could not match him. Fred Reinfeld wrote: "Tarrasch was destined to play second fiddle for the rest of his life." For example, Lasker scored much better against mutual opponents, e.g. vs. Chigorin, Tarrasch had +2 over 34 games while Lasker scored +7 in 21; vs. Akiba Rubinstein, Tarrasch was −8 without a single win, while Lasker scored +2−1=2; vs. David Janowski, Tarrasch scored +3 compared to Lasker's huge +22; vs. Géza Maróczy, Tarrasch was +1 over 16 games while Lasker scored +4−0=1, vs. Richard Teichmann Tarrasch scored +8−5=2, while Lasker beat him all four tournament games. However, Tarrasch had a narrow plus score against Harry Nelson Pillsbury of +6−5=2, while Lasker was even +5−5=4. Still, Tarrasch remained a powerful player, demolishing Frank Marshall in a match in 1905 (+8−1=8), and winning Ostend 1907 over Schlechter, Janowski, Marshall, Burn, and Chigorin.

By the time Lasker finally agreed to give Tarrasch a world title match in 1908, there was no love lost between them. The story goes that when they were introduced at the opening of their 1908 championship match, Tarrasch clicked his heels, bowed stiffly, and said, "To you, Dr. Lasker, I have only three words, check and mate"—then left the room. Lasker would beat Tarrasch convincingly in their match +8−3=5.

Tarrasch continued to be one of the leading players in the world. He finished fourth in the very strong St. Petersburg 1914 chess tournament, behind only World Champion Emanuel Lasker, and future World Champions José Raúl Capablanca and Alexander Alekhine. His win against Capablanca in the 19th round, though much less famous than Lasker's win against Capablanca the round before, was essential to enable Lasker to achieve his famous come-from-behind victory over Capablanca in the tournament.

Tarrasch lost +0-5=1 to Lasker in a 1916 match.

== Chess teachings ==
Tarrasch was a very influential chess writer, and was called Praeceptor Germaniae, meaning "Teacher of Germany." He took some of Wilhelm Steinitz's ideas (e.g. control of the center, bishop pair, space advantage) and made them more accessible to the average chess player. In other areas, he departed from Steinitz. He emphasized piece mobility much more than Steinitz did, and disliked cramped positions, saying that they "had the germ of defeat."

Tarrasch formulated a very important rule in rook endgames that is often called the Tarrasch rule:

The rooks belong behind passed pawns, behind their own in order to support their advance, behind the enemy's in order to impede their advance.

=== Chess publications ===
In 1895, Tarrasch's book Dreihundert Schachpartien was published. It was first translated into English in 1959 by Robin Ault and John Kirwan in a limited edition and a commercial edition in 1999 when S. Schwarz put out Three Hundred Chess Games. Tarrasch released Die moderne Schachpartie in 1912, but it has not been translated yet. He wrote a famous book about the St. Petersburg 1914 chess tournament, which was translated into English in 1993. His fourth major book Das Schachspiel (1931), was translated by G. E. Smith and T. G. Bone as The Game of Chess (1935, ISBN 048625447X). It was his last book and his most successful.

He edited the magazine Deutsche Schachzeitung in 1897, and Tarrasch's Schachzeitung, for the last two years of his life.

== Clash with hypermodern school ==
He was a target of the hypermodern school, led by Richard Réti, Aron Nimzowitsch, and Savielly Tartakower, all of whom criticized his ideas as dogmatic. However, many modern masters regard Tarrasch's actual play as not dogmatic. According to American grandmaster Andrew Soltis, Tarrasch's chess was "all about piece mobility".

As an example of his playing style see his victory on the Black side of the Advance French against Louis Paulsen (Nuremberg 1888):

1. e4 e6 2. d4 d5 3. e5 c5 4. c3 Nc6 5. Nf3 Qb6 6. Bd3 cxd4 Tarrasch gives this an exclamation mark, and points out that 6...Bd7 allows 7.dxc5 with a good game. However, most accounts credit Nimzowitsch with such anti-dogmatic hypermodern inventiveness when he played 7.dxc5 against Gersz Salwe almost a quarter of a century later. 7. cxd4 Bd7 8. Be2 Nge7 9. b3 Nf5 10. Bb2 Bb4+ 11. Kf1 Be7 12. g3 a5 13. a4 Rc8 14. Bb5 Nb4 15. Bxd7+ Kxd7 16. Nc3 Nc6 17. Nb5 Na7 18. Nxa7 Qxa7 19. Qd3 Qa6 20. Qxa6 bxa6 21. Kg2 Rc2 22. Bc1 Rb8 23. Rb1 Rc3 24. Bd2 Rcxb3 25. Rxb3 Rxb3 26. Bxa5 Rb2 27. Bd2 Bb4 28. Bf4 h6 29. g4 Ne7 30. Ra1 Nc6 31. Bc1 Rc2 32. Ba3 Rc4 33. Bb2 Bc3 34. Bxc3 Rxc3 35. Rb1 Kc7 36. g5 Rc4 37. gxh6 gxh6 38. a5 Ra4 39. Kg3 Rxa5 40. Kg4 Ra3 41. Rd1 Rb3 42. h4 Ne7 43. Ne1 Nf5 44. Nd3 a5 45. Nc5 Rc3 46. Rb1 Nxd4 47. Na6+ Kd8 48. Rb8+ Rc8 49. Rb7 Ke8 50. Nc7+ Kf8 51. Nb5 Nxb5 52. Rxb5 Ra8 53. f4 a4 54. Rb1 a3 55. f5 a2 56. Ra1 Ra4+ 57. Kh5 Kg7 58. fxe6 fxe6 59. Rg1+ Kh8 60. Ra1 Kh7 61. Rg1 a1=Q 62. Rg7+ Kh8 0–1

== Contributions to opening theory ==
A number of chess openings are named after Tarrasch, with the most notable being:

- The Tarrasch Defense, Tarrasch's favorite line against the Queen's Gambit in which Black takes on an isolated queen's pawn: 1.d4 d5 2.c4 e6 3.Nc3 c5!? 4.cxd5 exd5. A main line is then 5.Nf3 Nc6 6.g3 Nf6 7.Bg2 Be7 8.0-0 0-0. Tarrasch famously proclaimed, "The future will decide who has erred in estimating this defense, I or the chess world!"; today it is considered sound, though unfashionable.
- The Tarrasch Variation of the French Defense (3.Nd2), which Tarrasch late in his career considered to be refuted by 3...c5 4.exd5 exd5, with Black again "acquiring" an isolated queen's pawn. This is not thought a refutation today, but is still one of Black's most important lines.
- The Tarrasch Variation of the Ruy Lopez, usually known as the Open Defense (1.e4 e5 2.Nf3 Nc6 3.Bb5 a6 4.Ba4 Nf6 5.0-0 Nxe4).

== Famous Tarrasch combinations ==
Tarrasch vs. Allies, 1914

Position: c8 black rook, g8 black rook, d7 black queen, h7 black pawn, a6 black pawn, h6 black bishop, a5 white pawn, b5 black king, c5 black pawn, e5 white bishop, b4 black pawn, d4 black pawn, f4 white pawn, b3 white pawn, d3 white pawn, f3 white queen, c2 white rook, g2 white pawn, h2 white pawn, c1 white rook, g1 white king

In the game Tarrasch versus Allies, Black seems to be holding here (at least against an immediate catastrophe), because the black queen guards against Qb7+ (followed by Kxa5 Ra1#), while the black rook on c8 defends against Rxc5#. Tarrasch played the ingenious interference move 31.Bc7! (known as a Plachutta interference because the pieces both move orthogonally). This blocks off both defences, and whatever piece captures becomes overloaded. That is, if 31...Rxc7, the rook is overloaded, having to look after both the key squares, since the queen is blocked from b7. So White would play 32.Qb7+ Rxb7, deflecting the rook from defence of c5, allowing 33.Rxc5#. But if Black plays instead 31...Qxc7, the queen blocks off the rook's defence of c5 and becomes overloaded: 32.Rxc5+ Qxc5 deflects the queen from defence of b7, allowing 33.Qb7+ Kxa5 34.Ra1#. Black actually resigned after this move.

Tarrasch vs. Walbrodt, 1895

Position: d8 black bishop, g8 black rook, h8 black king, h7 black pawn, a6 black pawn, c5 black pawn, d5 black bishop, e5 black queen, f5 white knight, g5 black rook, h5 black knight, a4 white pawn, b4 black pawn, d4 black pawn, f4 white rook, b3 white pawn, d3 white queen, g3 white pawn, b2 white bishop, c2 white pawn, d2 white knight, f2 white rook, h2 white pawn, g1 white king

In the game against Carl Walbrodt, Tarrasch played rather poorly, and his opponent had the better of him for a long time. But the game was redeemed by the following startling combination: 34.Rxd4 seems obvious, because 34...cxd4 allows 35.Bxd4 winning the queen. But Black has a seemingly strong counterattack which had to be foreseen ... 34...Nxg3 35.Nxg3 Rxg3+ 36.hxg3 Rxg3+ 37.Kf1! Rxd3 and now the startling 38.Rg4!! with devastating threats of 39. Rf8+ mating and Bxe5 not to mention cxd3 to follow. Black resigned.

== See also ==
- Tarrasch Defense
- Tarrasch Trap
- Tarrasch rule
- List of Jewish chess players
