= DSB Congress =

Chess Federation

The Deutscher Schachbund (DSB) was founded in Leipzig on 18 July, 1877. When the next meeting took place in the Schützenhaus on 15 July 1879, sixty-two clubs had become member of the chess federation. Hofrat Rudolf von Gottschall became Chairman and Hermann Zwanziger the General Secretary. Twelve players participated in the master tournament of Leipzig 1879.

== Masters' Tournament ==
#	Year	City	Winner
1	1879	Leipzig	Berthold Englisch (Austria-Hungary) / Czech Silesia
2	1881	Berlin	Joseph Henry Blackburne (United Kingdom) / England
3	1883	Nuremberg	Szymon Winawer (Russian Empire) / Poland
4	1885	Hamburg	Isidor Gunsberg (United Kingdom) / Hungary
5	1887	Frankfurt	George Henry Mackenzie (United States) / Scotland
6	1889	Breslau	Siegbert Tarrasch (German Empire) / Prussian Silesia
7	1892	Dresden	Siegbert Tarrasch (German Empire) / Prussian Silesia
8	1893	Kiel	Carl August Walbrodt (German Empire) / Netherlands; Curt von Bardeleben (German Empire) / Brandenburg
9	1894	Leipzig	Siegbert Tarrasch (German Empire) / Prussian Silesia
10	1896	Eisenach	Robert Henry Barnes (New Zealand) / England
11	1898	Cologne	Amos Burn (United Kingdom) / England
12	1900	Munich	Géza Maróczy (Austria-Hungary) / Hungary; Harry Nelson Pillsbury (USA) / Massachusetts; Carl Schlechter (Austria-Hungary) / Austria
13	1902	Hannover	Dawid Janowski (France) / Poland
14	1904	Coburg	Curt von Bardeleben (German Empire) / Brandenburg; Carl Schlechter (Austria-Hungary) / Austria; Rudolf Swiderski (German Empire) / Saxony
15	1906	Nuremberg	Frank James Marshall (USA) / New York
16	1908	Düsseldorf	Frank James Marshall (USA) / New York
17	1910	Hamburg	Carl Schlechter (Austria-Hungary) / Austria
18	1912	Breslau	Akiba Rubinstein (Russian Empire) / Poland; Oldřich Duras (Austria-Hungary) / Bohemia
19	1914	Mannheim	Alexander Alekhine (Russian Empire) / Russia
20	1920	Berlin	Friedrich Sämisch (Germany) / Brandenburg
21	1921	Hamburg	Ehrhardt Post (Germany) / Brandenburg
22	1922	Oeynhausen	Ehrhardt Post (Germany) / Brandenburg
23	1923	Frankfurt	Ernst Grünfeld (Austria) / Lower Austria
24	1925	Breslau	Efim Bogoljubow (Soviet Union) / Ukraine
25	1926	Dresden	Aron Nimzowitsch (Denmark) / Denmark
26	1927	Magdeburg	Rudolf Spielmann (Austria) / Lower Austria
27	1929	Duisburg	Carl Ahues (Germany) / Lower Saxony
28	1931	Swinemünde	Efim Bogoljubow (Germany) / Ukraine; Ludwig Rödl (Germany) / Bavaria
29	1932	Bad Ems	Georg Kieninger (Germany) / Bavaria

== Hauptturnier A ==
#	Year	City	Winner
1	1879	Leipzig	–
2	1881	Berlin	Curt von Bardeleben (German Empire) / Brandenburg
3	1883	Nuremberg	Siegbert Tarrasch (German Empire) / Prussian Silesia
4	1885	Hamburg	Max Harmonist (German Empire) / Brandenburg
5	1887	Frankfurt	Johann Hermann Bauer (Austria-Hungary) / Bohemia
6	1889	Breslau	Emanuel Lasker (German Empire) / East Brandenburg
7	1892	Dresden	Paul Lipke (German Empire) / Thuringia
8	1893	Kiel	Hugo Süchting (German Empire) / Schleswig-Holstein
9	1894	Leipzig	Norman van Lennep (Netherlands) / North Holland
10	1896	Eisenach	Wilhelm Cohn (German Empire) / Brandenburg
11	1898	Cologne	Ottokar Pavelka (Austria-Hungary) / Bohemia
12	1900	Munich	Rudolf Swiderski (German Empire) / Saxony
13	1902	Hannover	Walter John (German Empire) / Poland
14	1904	Coburg	Augustin Neumann (Austria-Hungary) / Austria
15	1906	Nuremberg	Savielly Tartakower (Austria-Hungary) / Poland
16	1908	Düsseldorf	Friedrich Köhnlein (German Empire) / Bavaria
17	1910	Hamburg	Gersz Rotlewi (Russian Empire) / Poland
18	1912	Breslau	Bernhard Gregory (German Empire) / Estonia
19	1914	Mannheim	B. Hallegua (Ottoman Empire) / Turkey

== See also ==
- Silesian Chess Congress
- German Chess Championship
- List of strong chess tournaments
