= Grandmaster (chess) =

Title in chess awarded by FIDE

Grandmaster (GM) is a title awarded to chess players by the world chess organization FIDE. Apart from World Champion, Grandmaster is the highest title a chess player can attain. Once achieved, the title is held for life.

The title of Grandmaster, along with the lesser FIDE titles of International Master (IM), FIDE Master (FM), and Candidate Master (CM), is open to all players regardless of gender. The great majority of grandmasters are men, but 44 women have been awarded the GM title as of 2025, out of a total of about 2000 grandmasters. There is also a Woman Grandmaster title with lower requirements awarded only to women.

There are also Grandmaster titles for composers and solvers of chess problems, awarded by the World Federation for Chess Composition (see List of grandmasters for chess composition). The International Correspondence Chess Federation (ICCF) awards the title of International Correspondence Chess Grandmaster. Both of these bodies are now independent of FIDE, but work in cooperation with it.

FIDE titles are awarded at the quarterly FIDE Council meetings. Players who have qualified for the GM title but have not yet been awarded it are informally referred to as "GM-elect". The number of GMs has increased since the title was established, leading to the term "super grandmaster" emerging to refer to some of the best GMs.

== History ==
Usage of grandmaster for an expert in some field is recorded from 1590. The first known use of the term grandmaster in connection with chess was in the 18 February 1838 issue of Bell's Life, in which a correspondent referred to William Lewis as "our past grandmaster". Subsequently, George Walker and others referred to Philidor as a grandmaster, and the term was also applied to a few other players.

=== Early tournament use ===
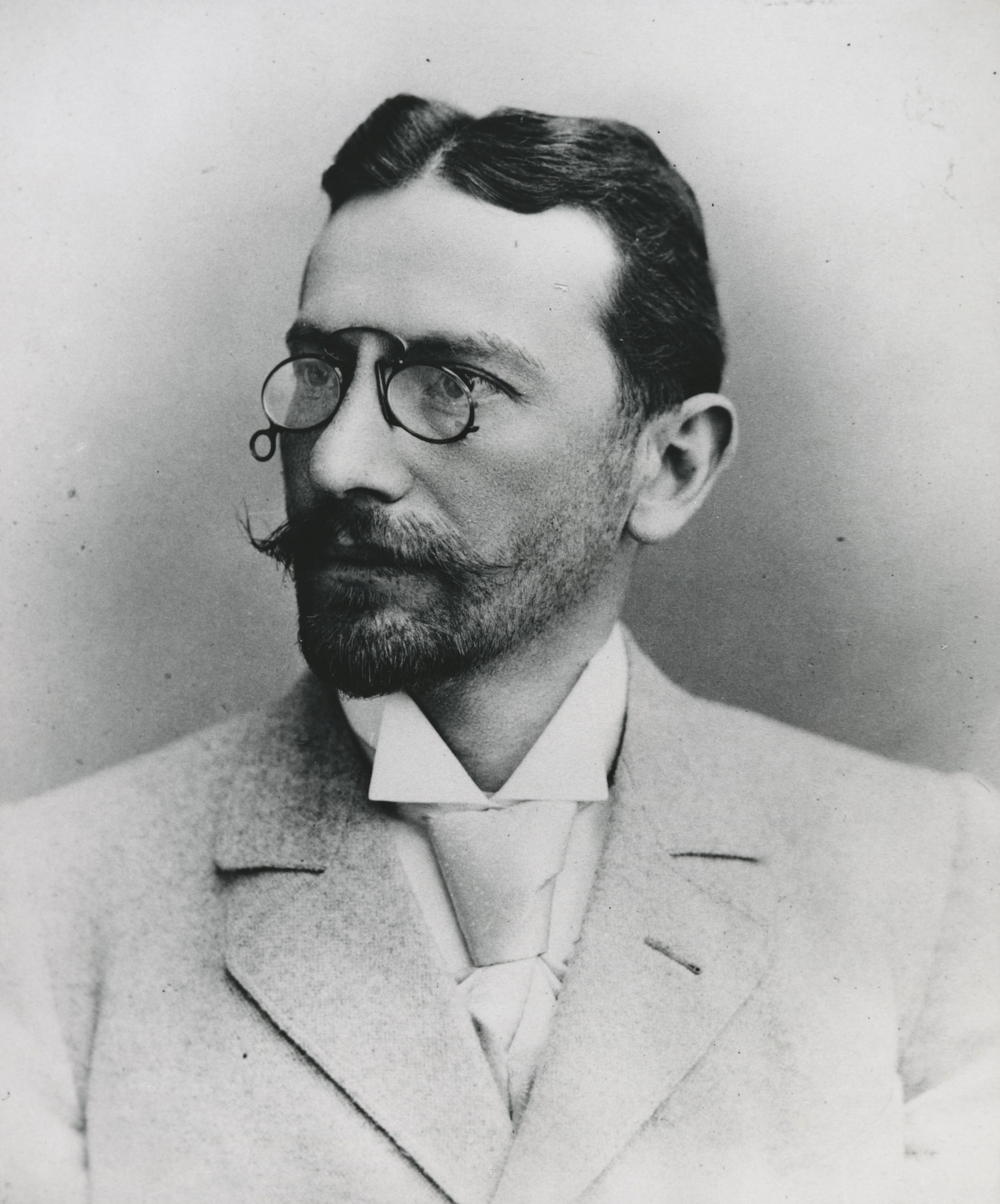
Siegbert Tarrasch (1862–1934)

The Ostend tournament of 1907 was divided into two sections: the Championship Tournament and the Masters' Tournament. The Championship section was for players who had previously won an international tournament. Siegbert Tarrasch won the Championship section, over Carl Schlechter, Dawid Janowski, Frank Marshall, Amos Burn, and Mikhail Chigorin. These players were described as grandmasters for the purposes of the tournament.

The San Sebastián 1912 tournament won by Akiba Rubinstein was a designated grandmaster event. Rubinstein won with 12½ points out of 19. Tied for second with 12 points were Aron Nimzowitsch and Rudolf Spielmann.

By some accounts, in the St. Petersburg 1914 chess tournament, the title Grandmaster was formally conferred by Russian Tsar Nicholas II, who had partially funded the tournament. The Tsar reportedly awarded the title to the five finalists: Emanuel Lasker, José Raúl Capablanca, Alexander Alekhine, Siegbert Tarrasch, and Frank Marshall. Chess historian Edward Winter has questioned this, stating that the earliest known sources that support this story are an article by Robert Lewis Taylor in the June 15, 1940, issue of The New Yorker and Marshall's autobiography My 50 Years of Chess (1942).

=== Informal and Soviet usage before 1950 ===
Before 1950, the term grandmaster was sometimes informally applied to world class players. The Fédération Internationale des Échecs (FIDE, or International Chess Federation) was formed in Paris in 1924, but at that time did not award formal titles.

In 1927, the Soviet Union's Chess Federation established the title of Grandmaster of the Soviet Union, in the form of the German loan word "Großmeister". At the time Soviet players were not competing outside their own country. This title was abolished in 1931, after having been awarded to Boris Verlinsky, who won the 1929 Soviet Championship. The title was brought back in 1935, and awarded to Mikhail Botvinnik, who thus became the first "official" Grandmaster of the USSR. Verlinsky did not get his title back.

=== Official status (1950 onwards) ===
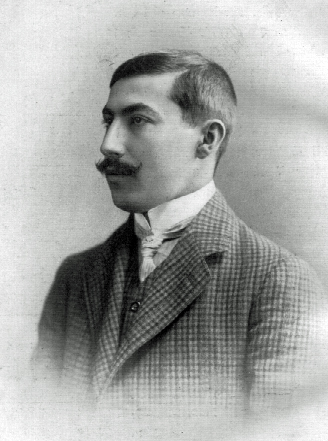
Akiba Rubinstein (1880–1961)

In 1950 FIDE created the titles of Grandmaster (GM), International Master (IM) and Woman Master (WM, later known as Woman International Master or WIM). The grandmaster title is sometimes called "International Grandmaster" (IGM), possibly to distinguish it from similar national titles, but the shortened form is far more common today.

Titles were awarded by a resolution of the FIDE General Assembly and the Qualification Committee, with no formal written criteria. FIDE first awarded the Grandmaster title in 1950 to 27 players. These players were:

- The top players of the day: world champion Mikhail Botvinnik, and those who had qualified for (or been seeded into) the inaugural Candidates Tournament in 1950: Isaac Boleslavsky, Igor Bondarevsky, David Bronstein, Max Euwe, Reuben Fine, Salo Flohr, Paul Keres, Alexander Kotov, Andor Lilienthal, Miguel Najdorf, Samuel Reshevsky, Vasily Smyslov, Gideon Ståhlberg, and László Szabó.
- Players still living who, though past their best in 1950, were recognised as having been world class when at their peak: Ossip Bernstein, Oldřich Duras, Ernst Grünfeld, Boris Kostić, Grigory Levenfish, Géza Maróczy, Jacques Mieses, Viacheslav Ragozin, Akiba Rubinstein, Friedrich Sämisch, Savielly Tartakower, and Milan Vidmar.

Since FIDE did not award the Grandmaster title posthumously, world-class players who died prior to 1950, including World Champions Steinitz, Lasker, Capablanca, and Alekhine, never received the title. A few strong still living players such as British India's Sultan Khan, Germany's Paul Lipke and France's Eugene Znosko-Borovsky were not awarded titles. Sultan Khan was awarded the GM title posthumously in 2024.

==== 1953 regulations ====
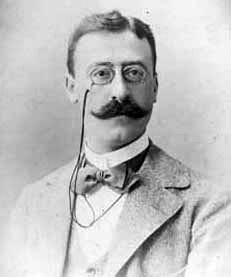
Jacques Mieses (1865–1954), one of the first FIDE Grandmasters

Title awards under the original regulations were subject to political concerns. Efim Bogoljubow, who had emigrated from the Soviet Union to Germany, was not entered in the first class of Grandmasters, even though he had played two matches for the World Championship with Alekhine. He received the title in 1951, by a vote of thirteen to eight with five abstentions. Yugoslavia supported his application, but all other Communist countries opposed it. In 1953, FIDE abolished the old regulations, although a provision was maintained that allowed older masters who had been overlooked to be awarded titles. The new regulations awarded the title of International Grandmaster of the FIDE to players meeting any of the following criteria:

1. The world champion.
2. Masters who have the absolute right to play in the World Championship Candidates Tournament, or any player who replaces an absent contestant and earns at least a 50 percent score.
3. The winner of an international tournament meeting specified standards, and any player placing second in two such tournaments within a span of four years. The tournament must be at least eleven rounds with seven or more players, 80 percent or more being International Grandmasters or International Masters. Additionally, 30 percent of the players must be Grandmasters who have the absolute right to play in the next World Championship Candidates Tournament, or who have played in such a tournament in the previous ten years.
4. A player who demonstrates ability manifestly equal to that of (3) above in an international tournament or match. Such titles must be approved by the Qualification Committee with the support of at least five members.

==== 1957 regulations ====
After FIDE issued the 1953 title regulations, it was recognized that they were somewhat haphazard, and work began to revise the regulations. The FIDE Congress in Vienna in 1957 adopted new regulations, called the FAV system, in recognition of the work done by International Judge Giovanni Ferrantes (Italy), Alexander (probably Conel Hugh O'Donel Alexander), and Giancarlo Dal Verme (Italy). Under the 1957 regulations, the title of International Grandmaster of the FIDE was automatically awarded to:

1. The world champion.
2. Any player qualifying from the Interzonal tournament to play in the Candidates Tournament, even if he did not play in the Candidates for any reason.
3. Any player who would qualify from the Interzonal to play in the Candidates but who was excluded because of a limitation on the number of participants from his Federation.
4. Any player who actually plays in a Candidates Tournament and scores at least 33⅓ percent.

The regulations also allowed titles to be awarded by a FIDE Congress on recommendation by the Qualification Committee. Recommendations were based on performance in qualifying tournaments, with the required score depending on the percentage of Grandmasters and International Masters in the tournament.

==== 1965 regulations ====
Concerns were raised that the 1957 regulations were too lax. At the FIDE Congress in 1961, GM Milan Vidmar said that the regulations "made it possible to award international titles to players without sufficient merit". At the 1964 Congress in Tel Aviv, a subcommittee was formed to propose changes to the regulations. The subcommittee recommended that the automatic award of titles be abolished, criticized the methods used for awarding titles based on qualifying performances, and called for a change in the makeup of the Qualification Committee. Several delegates supported the subcommittee recommendations, including GM Miguel Najdorf who felt that existing regulations were leading to an inflation of international titles. At the 1965 Congress in Wiesbaden FIDE raised the standards required for international titles. The International Grandmaster title regulations were:

- 1. Any World Champion is automatically awarded the GM title
- 2a. Anyone who scores at least 40 percent in a quarter-final match in the Candidates Tournament
- 2b. Scores at least the number of points in a tournament corresponding to the total of a 55 percent score against Grandmasters plus 75 percent against International Masters (IM) plus 85 percent against other players (a GM "norm").

To fulfill requirement 2b, the candidate must score one GM norm in a category 1a tournament or two norms within a three-year period in two Category 1b tournaments, or one Category 2a tournament and one Category 1b tournament.

The categories of tournaments are:

- 1a—at least sixteen players, at least 50 percent are GMs and 70 percent at least IMs
- 1b—at least twelve players, at least 33⅓ percent GMs and 70 percent IMs
- 2a—at least fifteen players, at least 50 percent IMs
- 2b—ten to fourteen players, at least 50 percent IMs.

Since FIDE titles are for life, a GM or IM does not count for the purposes of this requirement if he had not had a GM or IM result in the five years prior to the tournament.

In addition, no more than 50 percent plus one of the players can be from the same country for tournaments of 10 to 12 players, or no more than 50 percent plus two for larger tournaments.

Seventy-four GM titles were awarded in 1951 through 1968. During that period, ten GM titles were awarded in 1965, but only one in 1966 and in 1968.

==== 1970 regulations ====
The modern system for awarding FIDE titles evolved from the "Dorazil" proposals, presented to the 1970 Siegen Chess Olympiad FIDE Congress. The proposals were put together by Wilfried Dorazil (then FIDE Vice-President) and fellow Committee members Grandmaster Svetozar Gligorić and Professor Arpad Elo. The recommendations of the Committee report were adopted in full.

In essence, the proposals built on the work done by Professor Elo in devising his Elo rating system. The establishment of an updated list of players and their Elo rating enabled significantly strong international chess tournaments to be allocated a Category, based on the average rating of the contestants. For instance, it was decided that 'Category 1' status would apply to tournaments with an average Elo rating of participants falling within the range 2251–2275; similarly Category 2 would apply to the range 2276–2300 etc. The higher the tournament Category, the stronger the tournament.

Another vital component involved the setting of meritorious norms for each Category of tournament. Players must meet or surpass the relevant score to demonstrate that they had performed at Grandmaster (GM) or International Master (IM) level. Scores were expressed as percentages of a perfect maximum score and decreased as the tournament Category increased, thereby reflecting the strength of a player's opposition and the relative difficulty of the task.

Tournament organisers could then apply the percentages to their own tournament format and declare in advance the actual score that participants must achieve to attain a GM or IM result (nowadays referred to as a norm).

Cat.	Avg. Elo	Score (GM)	Score (IM)
1	2251–2275	85%	76%
2	2276–2300	83%	73%
3	2301–2325	81%	70%
4	2326–2350	78%	67%
5	2351–2375	76%	64%

Cat.	Avg. Elo	Score (GM)	Score (IM)
6	2376–2400	73%	60%
7	2401–2425	70%	57%
8	2426–2450	67%	53%
9	2451–2475	64%	50%
10	2476–2500	60%	47%

Cat.	Avg. Elo	Score (GM)	Score (IM)
11	2501–2525	57%	43%
12	2526–2550	53%	40%
13	2551–2575	50%	36%
14	2576–2600	47%	33%
15	2601–2625	43%	30%

To qualify for the Grandmaster title, a player needed to achieve three such GM results within a rolling period of three years. Exceptionally, if a player's contributory games totalled 30 or more, then the title could be awarded on the basis of two such results. There were also circumstances where the system could be adapted to fit team events and other competitions.

The full proposals included many other rules and regulations, covering such topics as:

- Eligible tournament formats
- Eligible participants
- Unrated participants
- Registration of tournaments with FIDE
- Calculations, including the handling of fractions

== Current regulations ==
To become a grandmaster, a player must achieve the following:

- Three favorable results, called norms. At least one of the norms coming from the Chess Olympiad, a national championship, a direct qualifier for the Candidates Tournament or World Cup, or an individual Swiss tournament with at least 40 participants having an average rating of 2000 and above. Also, at least one norm must meet the usual federation requirements.
- An Elo rating of at least 2500 at any point, including during a tournament. The player need not maintain this level to obtain or keep the title.

The Grandmaster title is also automatically conferred, without needing to fulfill the above criteria, when reaching the final 16 in the World Cup, winning the Women's World Cup, the World Junior Championship, the World Senior Championship, or a Continental Chess Championship, given that the player's peak FIDE rating is at least 2300.

FIDE titles including the grandmaster title are valid for life, but FIDE regulations allow a title to be revoked for "use of a FIDE title or rating to subvert the ethical principles of the title or rating system" or if a player is found to have violated the anti-cheating regulations in a tournament on which the title application was based.

Current regulations can be found in the FIDE Handbook.

=== Grandmaster norm ===
In general, a player earns a grandmaster norm when they achieve a tournament result that satisfies the following criteria:

- They play at least 9 games. If they exceed the norm requirements by full point(s), these full points count as additional number of games when computing the total number of games for the norm achieved. Only 7 games are required for World/Continental Team/Club Championships with 7–9 rounds and only 8 games are required for the World Cup or Women's World Cup.
- The tournament format is an individual or team Swiss, round-robin, knockout, or double round-robin with at least 6 players.
- They score at least 35% and achieve a FIDE performance rating of at least 2599.5.
- At least half of their opponents hold a FIDE title other than CM and WCM and at least one-third must be GMs.
- Their opponents must have an average rating of at least 2380, where unrated players are treated as rated 1400. At most one opponent's rating can be raised to a rating of 2200 for the average rating calculation.
- Their opponents must come from at least 2 federations other than their own, with at most three-fifths coming from their own federation and at most two-thirds from any single federation.

Unless the tournament has pre-determined pairings, a player who meets the norm requirements before the last round may ignore subsequent games. A tournament is exempt from the federation requirements if it is a National Championship, National Women's Championship, National Team Championship, Zonal or Sub-zonal tournament, or Swiss tournaments with at least 20 rated players from at least 3 different federations other than the host federation, at least 10 of whom hold GM, IM, WGM or WIM titles.

A grandmaster norm is also awarded, without needing to fulfill the above criteria, by reaching the finals of the Women's World Cup, winning the World U17 Championship, Continental Senior Championship, Continental Junior Championship, and tying for 1st place in the World Junior Chess Championship, World U18 Championship, and Continental Individual Championship, provided the player is top three on tiebreaks.

== Title inflation ==
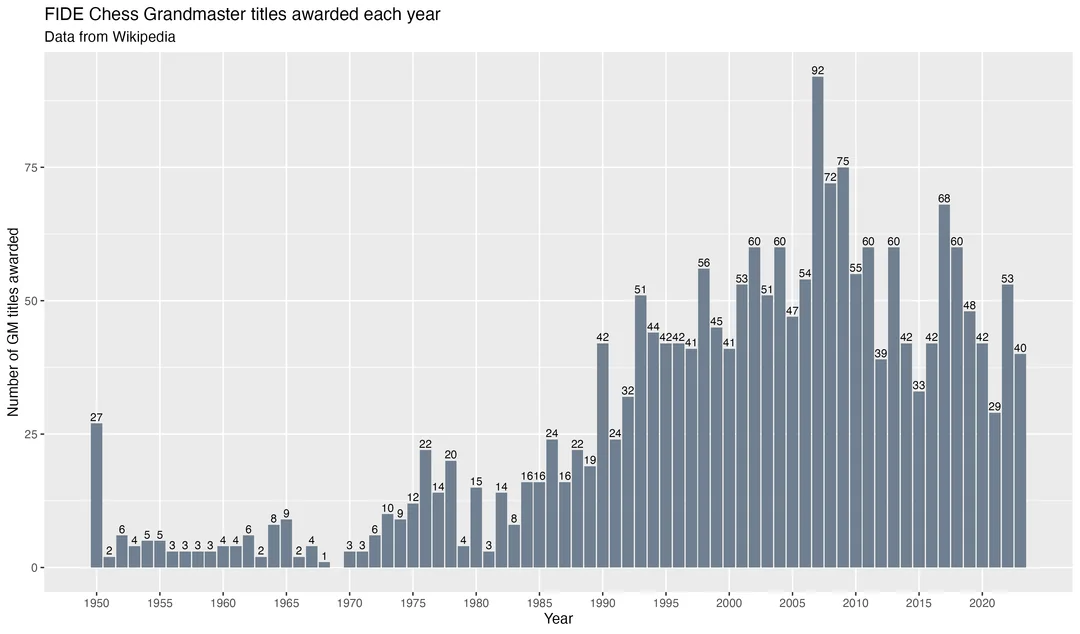
Number of new grandmasters per year

Evolution of the number of grandmasters

A report prepared by Bartłomiej Macieja for the Association of Chess Professionals mentions discussion at the 2008 FIDE Congress regarding a perceived decrease in value of the grandmaster title. The number of grandmasters had increased greatly between 1972 and 2008, but according to Macieja, the number of registered players rated over 2200 had increased even faster. Since that FIDE congress, discussion of the value of the grandmaster title has occasionally continued.

"Super grandmaster" is an informal term to refer to the world's elite players. In the past this would refer to players with an Elo rating of over 2600, but as the average Elo rating of the top players has increased, it has typically come to refer to players with an Elo rating of over 2700. Super GMs have some name recognition and are typically the highest earners in chess. The term emerged as a result of title inflation devaluing the GM title.

== Honorary grandmasters ==
Starting from 1977, FIDE awarded honorary Grandmaster titles to 32 players based on their past performances or other contributions to chess. The following players have been awarded honorary Grandmaster titles. Marić and Honfi were awarded the title posthumously in the year of their death, and Sultan Khan 58 years later.

- 1977 – Julio Bolbochán, Esteban Canal, Borislav Milić, Carlos Torre Repetto
- 1981 – Arnold Denker
- 1982 – Lodewijk Prins, Raúl Sanguineti
- 1983 – Vladimir Alatortsev, Alexander Konstantinopolsky, Erik Lundin
- 1984 – Eero Böök, Stojan Puc
- 1985 – Harry Golombek, Mario Monticelli, Jaroslav Šajtar
- 1986 – Arthur Dake, Theodor Ghițescu
- 1987 – Vladimir Makogonov, Vladas Mikėnas, Bogdan Śliwa
- 1988 – George Koltanowski
- 1990 – Andrija Fuderer, Rudolf Marić (posthumously)
- 1991 – Dragoljub Minić
- 1992 – Heinz Lehmann, Rudolf Teschner
- 1993 – Jonathan Penrose
- 1996 – Károly Honfi (posthumously), Enrico Paoli
- 1999 – Péter Dely
- 2003 – Elmārs Zemgalis
- 2024 – Sultan Khan (posthumously), Andreas Dückstein, Iivo Nei

== See also ==
- Chess title
- List of chess grandmasters
- List of female chess grandmasters
- List of chess players by peak FIDE rating
- List of youngest grandmasters
- Comparison of top chess players throughout history
