= Hamburg 1910 chess tournament =

The Hamburg 1910 chess tournament (the 17th DSB Congress) was organized by Walter Robinow, the President of the Hamburg Chess Club (Hamburger Schachklubs).

== Masters Tournament ==
Eighteen masters started but Franz Jakob withdrew after round 6.

The results and standings:

#	Player	1	2	3	4	5	6	7	8	9	10	11	12	13	14	15	16	17	18	Total
1	Carl Schlechter (Austria-Hungary)	x	0	1	½	½	½	1	1	½	1	1	1	½	1	½	½	1	-	11½
2	Oldřich Duras (Austria-Hungary)	1	x	1	½	1	½	½	1	½	0	½	1	1	1	0	½	1	-	11
3	Aron Nimzowitsch (Russian Empire)	0	0	x	1	½	1	½	½	1	1	1	½	0	½	1	1	1	-	10½
4	Rudolf Spielmann (Austria-Hungary)	½	½	0	x	½	0	½	½	1	1	0	1	1	½	1	1	1	-	10
5	Richard Teichmann (German Empire)	½	0	½	½	x	1	1	½	0	½	½	½	1	½	½	1	1	-	9½
6	Frank Marshall (United States)	½	½	0	1	0	x	0	½	1	½	½	0	1	1	1	1	1	-	9½
7	Fedor Duz-Khotimirsky (Russian Empire)	0	½	½	½	0	1	x	½	0	1	1	0	½	0	1	1	1	-	8½
8	Alexander Alekhine (Russian Empire)	0	0	½	½	½	½	½	x	0	0	1	1	½	½	1	1	1	-	8½
9	Siegbert Tarrasch (German Empire)	½	½	0	0	1	0	1	1	x	½	0	½	½	½	1	1	0	-	8
10	Leó Forgács (Austria-Hungary)	0	1	0	0	½	½	0	1	½	x	½	½	½	1	1	½	½	-	8
11	Paul Saladin Leonhardt (German Empire)	0	½	0	1	½	½	0	0	1	½	x	1	1	0	0	0	1	-	7
12	Savielly Tartakower (Austria-Hungary)	0	0	½	0	½	1	1	0	½	½	0	x	0	1	1	½	½	-	7
13	Gersz Salwe (Russian Empire)	½	0	1	0	0	0	½	½	½	½	0	1	x	½	0	1	1	-	7
14	Friedrich Köhnlein (German Empire)	0	0	½	½	½	0	1	½	½	0	1	0	½	x	1	0	1	-	7
15	Abraham Speijer (Netherlands)	½	1	0	0	½	0	0	0	0	0	1	0	1	0	x	1	½	-	5½
16	Walter John (German Empire)	½	½	0	0	0	0	0	0	0	½	1	½	0	1	0	x	1	-	5
17	Fred Yates (United Kingdom)	0	0	0	0	0	0	0	0	1	½	0	½	0	0	½	0	x	-	2½
-	Franz G. Jacob (German Empire)	-	-	-	-	-	0	-	½	-	½	-	0	-	-	-	½	0	x	1½

== Hauptturnier A ==
Sixteen players started but Matteo Gladig withdrew after round 4.

The final results:

1. Gersz Rotlewi Russian Empire

2. Carl Carls German Empire

3-4. Carl Ahues German Empire

3-4. Karel Hromadka Austria-Hungary

5. Edward Lasker German Empire

6-7. Solomon Rosenthal Russian Empire

6-7. Adrian Garcia Conde United Kingdom

8. G. Mayer German Empire

9-10. E. Busch German Empire

9-10. Eugene Ernest Colman United Kingdom

11. Gustaf Nyholm Sweden

12-13. Paul Fiebig German Empire

12-13. H. Gouwentak Netherlands

14-15. Bernhard Gregory Russian Empire

14-15. Arthur Kürschner German Empire

– Matteo Gladig Austria-Hungary
