= Carlsbad 1929 chess tournament =

The Carlsbad 1929 chess tournament was one of four well-known international chess tournaments held in the spa city of Carlsbad (Karlovy Vary, Bohemia, Czechoslovakia). The other tournament years were 1907, 1911 and 1923.

The 1929 Carlsbad tournament was held at the Kurhaus (Kaiserbad) imperial bath hotel. Twenty-two masters, under the direction of Viktor Tietz, participated from July 30 to August 28, 1929. The world champion Alexander Alekhine did not play but he wrote six reports for The New York Times during the tournament. Women's world champion Vera Menchik participated.

The results and standings:

#	Player	1	2	3	4	5	6	7	8	9	10	11	12	13	14	15	16	17	18	19	20	21	22	Total
1	Aron Nimzowitsch (Denmark)	x	½	1	½	½	1	1	1	½	½	1	1	½	½	½	1	0	1	½	1	½	1	15.0
2	José Raúl Capablanca (Cuba)	½	x	0	½	1	½	½	½	½	½	1	½	1	1	1	0	1	1	1	1	½	1	14.5
3	Rudolf Spielmann (Austria)	0	1	x	0	½	½	½	½	1	0	½	½	1	1	1	1	½	1	1	1	1	1	14.5
4	Akiba Rubinstein (Poland)	½	½	1	x	½	½	½	½	1	1	1	½	½	½	1	½	½	1	½	0	½	1	13.5
5	Albert Becker (Austria)	½	0	½	½	x	1	1	1	0	0	1	½	½	½	½	½	1	½	1	1	½	0	12.0
6	Milan Vidmar (Kingdom of Yugoslavia)	0	½	½	½	0	x	1	½	½	½	½	1	½	1	0	½	½	0	1	1	1	1	12.0
7	Max Euwe (Netherlands)	0	½	½	½	0	0	x	½	½	1	½	½	½	1	1	½	½	1	½	½	1	1	12.0
8	Efim Bogoljubow (Germany)	0	½	½	½	0	½	½	x	½	½	½	0	0	1	1	1	1	0	½	1	1	1	11.5
9	Ernst Grünfeld (Austria)	½	½	0	0	1	½	½	½	x	½	½	½	1	0	½	0	1	½	1	½	1	½	11.0
10	Esteban Canal (Peru)	½	½	1	0	1	½	0	½	½	x	1	½	0	0	½	½	0	1	0	½	1	1	10.5
11	Hermanis Matisons (Latvia)	0	0	½	0	0	½	½	½	½	0	x	1	1	1	0	1	1	1	½	0	½	1	10.5
12	Savielly Tartakower (Poland)	0	½	½	½	½	0	½	1	½	½	0	x	½	½	½	½	½	½	½	½	½	1	10.0
13	Géza Maróczy (Hungary)	½	0	0	½	½	½	½	1	0	1	0	½	x	0	0	0	1	½	1	1	½	1	10.0
14	Edgard Colle (Belgium)	½	0	0	½	½	0	0	0	1	1	0	½	1	x	1	½	1	0	½	0	1	1	10.0
15	Karel Treybal (Czechoslovakia)	½	0	0	0	½	1	0	0	½	½	1	½	1	0	x	½	½	0	1	1	½	1	10.0
16	Friedrich Sämisch (Germany)	0	1	0	½	½	½	½	0	1	½	0	½	1	½	½	x	½	0	½	½	1	0	9.5
17	Frederick Yates (England)	1	0	½	½	0	½	½	0	0	1	0	½	0	0	½	½	x	1	½	½	1	1	9.5
18	Paul Johner (Switzerland)	0	0	0	0	½	1	0	1	½	0	0	½	½	1	1	1	0	x	½	0	½	1	9.0
19	Frank James Marshall (United States)	½	0	0	½	0	0	½	½	0	1	½	½	0	½	0	½	½	½	x	1	1	1	9.0
20	Karl Gilg (Czechoslovakia)	0	0	0	1	0	0	½	0	½	½	1	½	0	1	0	½	½	1	0	x	½	½	8.0
21	George Alan Thomas (England)	½	½	0	½	½	0	0	0	0	0	½	½	½	0	½	0	0	½	0	½	x	1	6.0
22	Vera Menchik (Czechoslovakia)	0	0	0	0	1	0	0	0	½	0	0	0	0	0	0	1	0	0	0	½	0	x	3.0

Nimzowitsch got 20,000 Kronen, Capablanca and Spielmann 12,000 Kronen each, Rubinstein 8,000 Kronen, Becker, Vidmar and Euwe 5,000 Kronen each, and Bogoljubow 3,000 Kronen. Nimzowitsch expected to become challenger of the world champion and expressed his desire on his visiting cards. Unfortunately Alekhine crushed him in the San Remo 1930 chess tournament and Bled 1931 chess tournament.
