= List of round-robin chess tournaments =

This is a list of chess round-robin tournaments.

== Major present round-robin tournaments ==
- Candidates Tournament of the World Chess Championship (1950–1962, 1985, 2013–)
- Russian Chess Championship (most years)
- US Chess Championship (most years)
- Beverwijk and Wijk aan Zee (Corus & Tata Steel Chess Tournament)
- Sinquefield Cup
- Dortmund Sparkassen Chess Meeting (most years)
- Biel Chess Festival (most years)
- Norway Chess
- Shamkir Chess
- Capablanca Memorial (most years)

== Major historic round-robin tournaments ==
- London (1862)
- Hastings (1895)
- Nuremberg (1896)
- Monte Carlo chess tournament (1901–1904, 1967–1969)
- Ostend (B) (1907)
- St. Petersburg (1909)
- San Sebastián (1911)
- Carlsbad (1911)
- Mannheim (1914)
- Carlsbad (1929)
- San Remo (1930)
- New York (1931)
- Nottingham (1936)
- Kemeri (1937)
- AVRO tournament (1938)
- General Government (1940–1944)
- Munich (1942)
- Groningen (1946)
- World Chess Championship 1948
- Interzonal of the World Chess Championship (most years, 1948–1993)
- USSR Chess Championship (most years)
- Linares International Chess Tournament (1981–2010)
- Reggio Emilia chess tournament
- World Chess Championship 2007
- Pearl Spring chess tournament (Nanjing, 2008)
- M-Tel Masters (Sofia)
- Tal Memorial (Moscow, 2009–2013)
- Bilbao Chess Masters Final
- Zurich Chess Challenge
