= Carlsbad 1911 chess tournament =

The Carlsbad 1911 chess tournament was one of four well-known international chess tournaments held in the spa city of Carlsbad (Bohemia, then Austria-Hungary Empire). The other tournament years were 1907, 1923 and 1929.

The opening ceremony was held at the imperial bath hotel Kurhaus (Kaiserbad) on 20 August 1911. Twenty-six chess masters were invited to participate in the enormous round-robin tournament (325 games). Of the top players in the world then only three were missing from the tournament: Emanuel Lasker, Siegbert Tarrasch, and José Raúl Capablanca, who had won his first international tournament at San Sebastian earlier in the year. The participants played from 20 August to 24 September 1911. At the end Richard Teichmann was the winner.

The final standings and crosstable:

#	Player	1	2	3	4	5	6	7	8	9	10	11	12	13	14	15	16	17	18	19	20	21	22	23	24	25	26	Total
1	Richard Teichmann (German Empire)	*	1	1	1	½	1	½	½	1	0	1	1	½	½	½	1	0	½	½	½	1	1	½	1	1	1	18
2	Akiba Rubinstein (Russian Empire)	0	*	½	½	0	½	½	1	½	1	1	0	½	1	1	½	1	1	1	½	½	½	1	1	1	1	17
3	Carl Schlechter (Austria-Hungary)	0	½	*	0	½	½	½	1	½	0	1	½	1	1	1	1	1	0	½	1	1	1	½	1	1	1	17
4	Gersz Rotlewi (Russian Empire)	0	½	1	*	1	1	0	0	1	½	0	1	1	0	1	1	0	1	1	1	1	0	0	1	1	1	16
5	Frank James Marshall (United States)	½	1	½	0	*	½	0	½	½	1	½	½	½	½	1	1	½	1	0	1	½	1	0	1	1	1	15½
6	Aron Nimzowitsch (Russian Empire)	0	½	½	0	½	*	½	0	0	0	½	½	1	1	1	½	½	1	1	1	½	1	1	1	1	1	15½
7	Milan Vidmar (Austria-Hungary)	½	½	½	1	1	½	*	0	½	1	0	1	½	0	1	½	1	0	0	½	½	1	1	½	1	1	15½
8	Paul Saladin Leonhardt (German Empire)	½	0	0	1	½	1	1	*	½	0	1	½	½	0	0	½	1	½	1	0	1	0	1	1	1	0	13½
9	Savielly Tartakower (Austria-Hungary)	0	½	½	0	½	1	½	½	*	1	0	½	½	½	½	1	0	1	1	1	1	0	1	0	0	1	13½
10	Oldřich Duras (Austria-Hungary)	1	0	1	½	0	1	0	1	0	*	0	0	½	1	0	0	½	1	1	½	½	1	½	1	½	1	13½
11	Alexandre Alekhine (Russian Empire)	0	0	0	1	½	½	1	0	1	1	*	0	0	1	½	1	0	½	0	0	1	1	1	1	½	1	13½
12	Rudolf Spielmann (Austria-Hungary)	0	1	½	0	½	½	0	½	½	1	1	*	0	1	1	½	½	½	1	½	½	1	0	0	1	0	13
13	Julius Perlis (Austria-Hungary)	½	½	0	0	½	0	½	½	½	½	1	1	*	½	1	½	1	1	0	1	½	0	0	0	0	1	12
14	Erich Cohn (German Empire)	½	0	0	1	½	0	1	1	½	0	0	0	½	*	½	½	1	0	1	1	0	0	½	1	1	0	11½
15	Grigory Levenfish (Russian Empire)	½	0	0	0	0	0	0	1	½	1	½	0	0	½	*	1	1	½	½	½	1	1	1	0	1	0	11½
16	Hugo Süchting (German Empire)	0	½	0	0	0	½	½	½	0	1	0	½	½	½	0	*	1	1	0	½	0	1	½	1	1	1	11½
17	Amos Burn (United Kingdom)	1	0	0	1	½	½	0	0	1	½	1	½	0	0	0	0	*	0	½	1	½	1	1	1	0	0	11
18	Gersz Salwe (Russian Empire)	½	0	1	0	0	0	1	½	0	0	½	½	0	1	½	0	1	*	1	½	½	0	½	½	1	½	11
19	Paul Johner (Switzerland)	½	0	½	0	1	0	1	0	0	0	1	0	1	0	½	1	½	0	*	½	1	0	1	1	0	0	10½
20	Abram Rabinovich (Russian Empire)	½	½	0	0	0	0	½	1	0	½	1	½	0	0	½	½	0	½	½	*	½	1	½	0	1	1	10½
21	Boris Kostić (Austria-Hungary)	0	½	0	0	½	½	½	0	0	½	0	½	½	1	0	1	½	½	0	½	*	½	1	1	0	1	10½
22	Fyodor Duz-Khotimirsky (Russian Empire)	0	½	0	1	0	0	0	1	1	0	0	0	1	1	0	0	0	1	1	0	½	*	1	0	0	1	10
23	Simon Alapin (Russian Empire)	½	0	½	1	1	0	0	0	0	½	0	1	1	½	0	½	0	½	0	½	0	0	*	½	½	0	8½
24	Oscar Chajes (United States)	0	0	0	0	0	0	½	0	1	0	0	1	1	0	1	0	0	½	0	1	0	1	½	*	0	1	8½
25	Hans Fahrni (Switzerland)	0	0	0	0	0	0	0	0	1	½	½	0	1	0	0	0	1	0	1	0	1	1	½	1	*	0	8½
26	Charles Jaffe (United States)	0	0	0	0	0	0	0	1	0	0	0	1	0	1	1	0	1	½	1	0	0	0	1	0	1	*	8½

== See also ==
Karlsbad 1911 chess games
