= Carlsbad 1907 chess tournament =

The Carlsbad 1907 chess tournament was one of four well-known international chess tournaments held in the spa city of Carlsbad (Bohemia, then Austria-Hungary Empire). The other tournament years were 1911, 1923 and 1929.

The 1907 tournament was held at the Kurhaus (Kaiserbad) imperial bath hotel. Twenty-one great masters, under the direction of Viktor Tietz, played from August 20 to September 17, 1907.

The results and standings:

#	Player	1	2	3	4	5	6	7	8	9	10	11	12	13	14	15	16	17	18	19	20	21	Total
1	Akiba Rubinstein (Russian Empire)	x	½	½	0	½	½	1	1	1	½	1	1	0	1	1	1	1	½	1	1	1	15
2	Géza Maróczy (Austria-Hungary)	½	x	0	½	½	½	½	1	1	½	1	½	1	1	1	½	1	½	1	1	1	14½
3	Paul Saladin Leonhardt (German Empire)	½	1	x	½	0	1	½	1	½	½	½	1	½	1	1	½	½	1	1	0	1	13½
4	Aron Nimzowitsch (Russian Empire)	1	½	½	x	1	½	½	½	½	½	0	0	½	0	1	½	1	1	1	1	1	12½
5	Carl Schlechter (Austria-Hungary)	½	½	1	0	x	½	0	½	0	½	½	½	½	1	1	1	½	1	1	1	1	12½
6	Milan Vidmar (Austria-Hungary)	½	½	0	½	½	x	1	1	½	1	0	1	1	1	0	½	1	1	1	0	0	12
7	Richard Teichmann (German Empire)	0	½	½	½	1	0	x	0	1	1	½	½	1	1	½	½	0	½	½	1	1	11½
8	Oldřich Duras (Austria-Hungary)	0	0	0	½	½	0	1	x	0	0	½	1	1	1	1	1	1	1	1	1	0	11½
9	Gersz Salwe (Russian Empire)	0	0	½	½	1	½	0	1	x	½	½	0	0	½	1	1	½	1	1	1	½	11
10	Heinrich Wolf (Austria-Hungary)	½	½	½	½	½	0	0	1	½	x	½	½	1	1	1	½	1	0	0	½	½	10½
11	Frank James Marshall (United States)	0	0	½	1	½	1	½	½	½	½	x	1	½	0	0	½	0	0	1	1	1	10
12	Fedor Duz-Khotimirsky (Russian Empire)	0	½	0	1	½	0	½	0	1	½	0	x	1	0	1	1	0	1	0	1	1	10
13	Rudolf Spielmann (Austria-Hungary)	1	0	½	½	½	0	0	0	1	0	½	0	x	0	1	½	0	1	1	1	1	9½
14	Savielly Tartakower (Austria-Hungary)	0	0	0	1	0	0	0	0	½	0	1	1	1	x	0	½	1	0	1	1	1	9
15	Dawid Janowski (France)	0	0	0	0	0	1	½	0	0	0	1	0	0	1	x	1	1	1	0	1	1	8½
16	Johann Berger (Austria-Hungary)	0	½	½	½	0	½	½	0	0	½	½	0	½	½	0	x	1	1	0	½	½	7½
17	Mikhail Chigorin (Russian Empire)	0	0	½	0	½	0	1	0	½	0	1	1	1	0	0	0	x	0	1	0	1	7½
18	Jacques Mieses (German Empire)	½	½	0	0	0	0	½	0	0	1	1	0	0	1	0	0	1	x	1	1	0	7½
19	Adolf Georg Olland (Netherlands)	0	0	0	0	0	0	½	0	0	1	0	1	0	0	1	1	0	0	x	1	1	6½
20	Erich Cohn (German Empire)	0	0	1	0	0	1	0	0	0	½	0	0	0	0	0	½	1	0	0	x	1	5
21	Paul Johner (Switzerland)	0	0	0	0	0	1	0	1	½	½	0	0	0	0	0	½	0	1	0	0	x	4½
