= Adrián García Conde =

Mexican-British chess player (1886–1943)

Adrián García Conde (4 May 1886 – 13 May 1943) was a Mexican-British chess master.

Born in Valladolid, Yucatán, Mexico, since age 4 he lived in Liverpool, Bradford, London, Hull, and then in London again.

He won the Liverpool Chess Club Table tournament in 1907/8 and 1908/9, tied for 6-7th in the Hamburg 1910 chess tournament (the 17th DSB Congress, Hauptturnier A, Gersz Rotlewi won), took 6th at San Sebastian 1911 (B tournament, Rodriguez won).

After World War I, he settled in United Kingdom. While living in Hull, he led a team (with H Williams and R Bainbridge) playing White against a team led by Alekhine (with G Barron and E Hanger). The Hull Times described the game (won by Black) as "probably the best game ever played in Hull". He took 10th in the Hastings International Chess Congress 1919 (Summer Congress, José Raúl Capablanca won), tied for 4-5th at Hastings 1922/23 (Akiba Rubinstein won), took 2nd, behind Max Romih, at Scarborough 1925 (Premier A), tied for 3rd-4th at London 1929 (Quadrangular, Frederick Yates won), tied for 6-7th at Ramsgate 1929 (Premier A, William Gibson won), shared 1st with George Koltanowski at Margate 1936 (Premier A), and took 6th at Bournemouth 1939 (Max Euwe won).

He died in London during World War II.
