= Heinrich Wolf =

Austrian chess player (1875–1943)

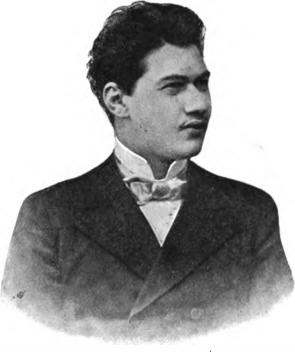
Heinrich Wolf

Heinrich Wolf (Yiddish: הענאָך וואָלף; 20 October 1875 – December 1943) was an Austrian journalist and chess master of Jewish origin.

== Biography ==
Wolf was born in Jägerndorf, Austrian Silesia, today the city of Krnov, Czech Republic, in 1875.

In 1897, he tied for 5–7th in Berlin (Géza Maróczy won). In 1900 he tied for 7-10th in Munich (the 12th DSB Congress, Maroczy, Carl Schlechter and Harry Pillsbury won). In 1902, he tied for 5-7th in the Monte Carlo chess tournament (Maroczy won), tied for 5-6th in Hannover (13th DSB–Congress, Dawid Janowski won), and won, jointly with Janowski, in Vienna (Pentagonal). Wolf drew a match with Ossip Bernstein (+1 –1 =6).

In 1903, he took 7th in Monte Carlo (Siegbert Tarrasch won). In 1904 he tied for 8-9th in Coburg (14th DSB–Congress, Curt von Bardeleben, Schlechter and Rudolf Swiderski won), and tied for 4-5th in Vienna (Schlechter won). In 1905 he took 10th in Ostend (Maroczy won), tied for 7-10th in Barmen (Janowski and Maroczy won), and took 2nd, behind Schlechter, in Vienna. In 1906, he tied for 6th in Nuremberg (15th DSB–Congress, Frank Marshall won). In 1907, he tied for 9-11th in Vienna (Jacques Mieses won), and took 10th in the Carlsbad 1907 chess tournament (Akiba Rubinstein won). In 1908, he tied for 9th in Düsseldorf (16th DSB–Congress, Marshall won).

In 1908, Emanuel Lasker engaged Semyon Alapin and Wolf as seconds (first introduction of seconds in world championship play) for the WCC match against Tarrasch, held in Düsseldorf and Munich.

After World War I, he tied for 6-7th at Piešťany (Pistyan) 1922 (Efim Bogoljubow won), tied for 8-10th at Teplice-Šanov (Teplitz-Schönau) 1922 (Richard Réti and Rudolf Spielmann won), and took 3rd at Vienna 1922 (Rubinstein won), took 14th in the Carlsbad 1923 chess tournament (Alexander Alekhine, Bogoljubov and Maroczy won), and tied for 12-13th at Maehrisch-Ostrau Ostrava 1923 (Emanuel Lasker won).

With the beginning of the Second World War, the Jews of Vienna were moved to group apartments, Wolf's last known address being at Rembrandtstraße 22. In December 1941 Wolf was deported to the Riga Ghetto where he was later murdered.
