= Viktor Tietz =

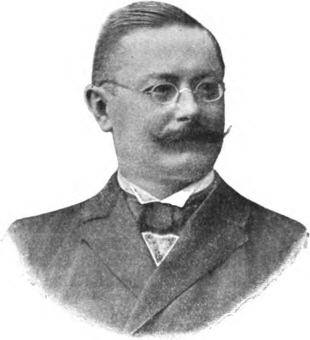
Viktor Tietz

Viktor Tietz (13 April 1859 – 8 December 1937) was an ethnic-German Austrian and Czechoslovak chess player, chess life organizer and local politician.

He took 7th at Breslau 1889 (the 6th DSB Congress, Hauptturnier A won by Emanuel Lasker), and won ahead of Dawid Janowski and Moritz Porges at Carlsbad 1902 (Triangular).

He invented the tie-break system now called the Tietz system. His name is attached to the chess club in Karlovy Vary. He was a main organizer of four famous international tournaments: the Carlsbad 1907, the Carlsbad 1911, the Carlsbad 1923, and the Carlsbad 1929.
