= Bled 1931 chess tournament =

Yugoslavian chess tournament

Bled 1931 chess tournament was a major chess tournament proposed by Milan Vidmar and held in 1931 in Bled and Ljubljana, Slovenia, then part of the Kingdom of Yugoslavia.

José Raúl Capablanca was not invited due to his disputes with world champion Alexander Alekhine. Noted master and writer Al Horowitz noted that Alekhine used his position as world champion to keep Capablanca out of the event. Akiba Rubinstein was invited, but was replaced by Gösta Stoltz because Rubinstein accepted the invitation too late.

Fourteen leading chess masters accepted their invitations. Round one started in the large salon on August 23, 1931. Alekhine won the tournament decisively, not losing a single game and finishing 5½ points ahead of Efim Bogoljubow. His gambit style was humiliating for the other players.

== Crosstable ==
Bled 1931
#	Player	1	2	3	4	5	6	7	8	9	10	11	12	13	14	Total
1	Alexandre Alekhine (France)	**	1½	11	½½	1½	1½	11	1½	½½	1½	11	11	½½	11	20½
2	Efim Bogoljubov (Germany)	0½	**	½0	11	0½	11	1½	10	0½	01	00	11	½1	11	15
3	Aron Nimzowitsch (Denmark)	00	½1	**	00	½½	11	0½	½½	½1	½½	1½	1½	11	0½	14
4	Isaac Kashdan (United States)	½½	00	11	**	½½	0½	1½	00	½½	1½	10	11	½½	½½	13½
5	Milan Vidmar (Kingdom of Yugoslavia)	0½	1½	½½	½½	**	½0	½0	½½	½0	11	½½	½1	½1	½½	13½
6	Salo Flohr (Czechoslovakia)	0½	00	00	1½	½1	**	½½	10	½1	1½	11	½0	½1	½½	13½
7	Gösta Stoltz (Sweden)	00	0½	1½	0½	½1	½½	**	11	½1	½½	½1	00	01	1½	13½
8	Savielly Tartakower (Poland)	0½	01	½½	11	½½	01	00	**	½½	½0	½½	11	½½	½½	13
9	Rudolf Spielmann (Austria)	½½	1½	½0	½½	½1	½0	½0	½½	**	½½	0½	00	1½	11	12½
10	Borislav Kostić (Kingdom of Yugoslavia)	0½	10	½½	0½	00	0½	½½	½1	½½	**	½½	01	1½	11	12½
11	Géza Maróczy (Hungary)	00	11	0½	01	½½	00	½0	½½	1½	½½	**	½1	½½	½½	12
12	Edgar Colle (Belgium)	00	00	0½	00	½0	½1	11	00	11	10	½0	**	0½	11	10½
13	Lajos Asztalos (Kingdom of Yugoslavia)	½½	½0	00	½½	½0	½0	10	½½	0½	0½	½½	1½	**	0½	9½
14	Vasja Pirc (Kingdom of Yugoslavia)	00	00	1½	½½	½½	½½	0½	½½	00	00	½½	00	1½	**	8½
