= Gersz Rotlewi =

Polish chess player

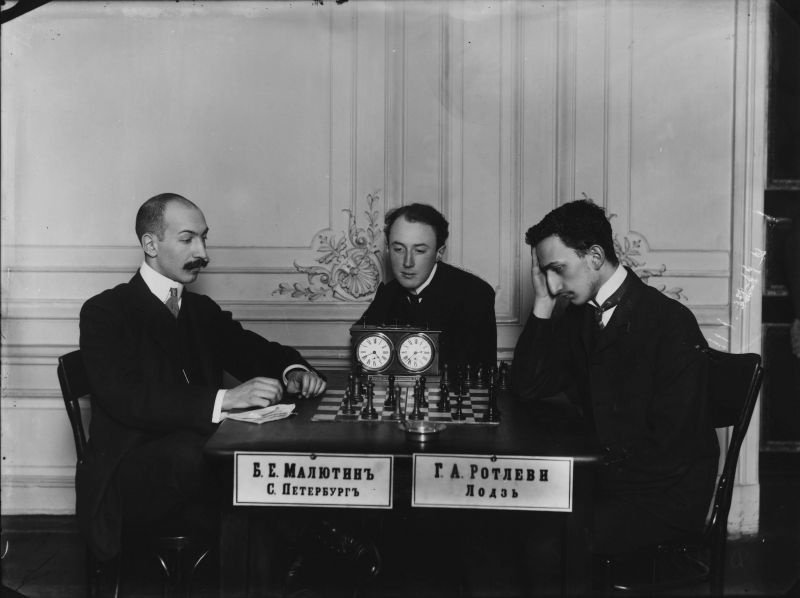
- Chess masters Boris Maliutin (left) and Gersz Rotlewi

Personal information
- Born: 1889
- Died: 1920 (aged 30–31)

Chess career
- Country: Poland

Gersz (Georg, George, Gersh) Rotlewi (Rotlevi, Rotlevy) (1889 – 1920) was a Polish chess master.

== Biography ==
In 1906, Rotlewi tied for 5-6th in Łódź (Akiba Rubinstein won). In 1907, he took 3rd, behind Rubinstein and Dawid Daniuszewski, in Lodz (Quadrangular), took 2nd, behind Heilmann, in Ostend (main class I section), and took 6th in Lodz (the 5th Russian Chess Championship; the event was won by Rubinstein). He took 4th in the Prague 1908 chess tournament (Hauptturnier, preliminary), tied for 1st with Daniuszewski at Lodz 1909, and took 2nd, behind Alexander Alekhine, at Saint Petersburg 1909 (the All-Russian Amateur tournament).

Rotlewi played two matches against Gersz Salwe, losing in 1909 (+5 –8 =5) and winning in 1910 (+3 –1 =6).

In 1910, he tied for 1st with Rubinstein in Warsaw and won in the Hamburg 1910 chess tournament (the 17th DSB Congress, Hauptturnier A), which earned him the Master Title and the right {and invitation} to compete at the Carlsbad 1911 chess tournament. In 1911, he took 4th in Carlsbad (Richard Teichmann won). This was the greatest result of Rotlewi's short career. He finished ahead of such prominent players as Frank Marshall, Aron Nimzowitsch, Milan Vidmar, Savielly Tartakower, Alexander Alekhine, and Rudolf Spielmann. In the same year, he tied for 2nd-4th in Cologne (Moishe Lowtzky won) and took 2nd in Munich (Simon Alapin won).

After this, a nervous disorder forced him to give up serious chess. He died in 1920 at the age of 31.

== Notable chess games ==
- Grigory Helbach vs Gersz Rotlewi, Sankt Petersburg 1909, All Russian Amateur, Scandinavian Defense, Mieses Variation, B01, 0-1
- Gersz Salwe vs Gersz Rotlewi, Carlsbad 1911, French Defense, Rubinstein Variation, Blackburne Defense, C10, 0-1
- Gersz Rotlewi vs Frank James Marshall, Carlsbad 1911, Queen's Gambit Declined, Cambridge Springs Variation, D52, 1-0

== See also ==
- Rotlewi versus Rubinstein
