= Eugene Ernest Colman =

English chess player (1878–1964)

Eugene Ernest Colman (11 October 1878 – 20 July 1964) was an English chess master.

Colman was born in Merton, England, the son of the architect Ernest Gershom Colman (1851–1935). He was educated at St Paul's School, London, and Trinity College, Cambridge, graduating from Cambridge University with a first-class degree in classics in 1900. He subsequently entered service in the Malay States; when he retired, he stayed on in Malaysia and set up youth clubs throughout the peninsula.

He tied for 9-10th in the Hamburg 1910 chess tournament (the 17th DSB Congress, Hauptturnier A, Gersz Rotlewi won), tied for 6-7th at Oxford 1910, took 10th at London 1910, shared 3rd at Tunbridge Wells 1911, tied for 10-11th at London 1919, and took 7th at Margate 1923.

His name is attached to the Colman Variation of the Two Knights Defense (1.e4 e5 2.Nf3 Nc6 3.Bc4 Nf6 4.Ng5 d5 5.exd5 Na5 6.Bb5+ c6 7.dxc6 bxc6 8.Qf3 Rb8) but the most remarkable thing about it were the circumstances under which it was first analysed. During World War II Colman was interned in Changi Civilian Internees Camp in Singapore (1942–1945) and his opening analysis helped take his (and his fellow prisoners') mind off the horrors of the prison (about 850 POWs died in Changi Prison during the Japanese occupation).

He returned to England and lived in Wimbledon where he was an active member of the Wimbledon Chess Club. Coleman called his variation "The Wimbledon Defense."
