= Carlsbad 1923 chess tournament =

The third international chess tournament (the first Carlsbad 1907 chess tournament, the second Carlsbad 1911 chess tournament) was held in the health resort of Carlsbad (German: Karlsbad, Czech: Karlovy Vary), Czechoslovakia. The eighteen participants, under the direction of Viktor Tietz, played their games in the Helenenhof Imperial Hotel, from April 27 to May 22, 1923.

Alexander Alekhine showed great fighting chess and took the lead. But tailender Rudolf Spielmann defeated him in the penultimate round, and Géza Maróczy caught up. Efim Bogoljubow joined the lead in the last round.

The results and standings:

#	Player	1	2	3	4	5	6	7	8	9	10	11	12	13	14	15	16	17	18	Total
1	Alexander Alekhine (Soviet Union)	x	1	1	½	1	½	0	0	½	½	1	1	1	1	½	1	0	1	11.5
1	Efim Bogoljubow (Germany)	0	x	½	0	½	1	1	½	½	1	1	1	0	½	1	1	1	1	11.5
1	Géza Maróczy (Hungary)	0	½	x	½	1	½	½	1	½	½	½	½	½	1	1	1	1	1	11.5
4	Richard Réti (Czechoslovakia)	½	1	½	x	½	½	½	1	1	1	½	1	1	0	½	1	0	0	10.5
4	Ernst Grünfeld (Austria)	0	½	0	½	x	1	1	½	½	1	½	½	1	½	½	½	1	1	10.5
6	Aron Nimzowitsch (Denmark)	½	0	½	½	0	x	0	1	½	1	1	1	1	1	1	0	1	0	10.0
6	Karel Treybal (Czechoslovakia)	1	0	½	½	0	1	x	0	½	½	½	½	1	½	½	1	1	1	10.0
8	Fred Yates (England)	1	½	0	0	½	0	1	x	½	½	1	½	0	1	1	½	1	½	9.5
9	Richard Teichmann (Germany)	½	½	½	0	½	½	½	½	x	½	0	½	½	½	½	1	1	1	9.0
10	Savielly Tartakower (Poland)	½	0	½	0	0	0	½	½	½	x	½	½	½	½	1	1	1	1	8.5
11	Siegbert Tarrasch (Germany)	0	0	½	½	½	0	½	0	1	½	x	0	1	1	½	1	0	1	8.0
12	Akiba Rubinstein (Poland)	0	0	½	0	½	0	½	½	½	½	1	x	0	0	1	1	1	½	7.5
13	Jacob Bernstein (United States)	0	1	½	0	0	0	0	1	½	½	0	1	x	½	0	1	0	1	7.0
14	Heinrich Wolf (Austria)	0	½	0	1	½	0	½	0	½	½	0	1	½	x	0	½	1	0	6.5
15	Friedrich Sämisch (Germany)	½	0	0	½	½	0	½	0	½	0	½	0	1	1	x	0	0	1	6.0
16	George Alan Thomas (England)	0	0	0	0	½	1	0	½	0	0	0	0	0	½	1	x	1	1	5.5
17	Rudolf Spielmann (Austria)	1	0	0	1	0	0	0	0	0	0	1	0	1	0	1	0	x	0	5.0
17	Oscar Chajes (United States)	0	0	0	1	0	1	0	½	0	0	0	½	0	1	0	0	1	x	5.0

The three winners earned 3,505 Czechoslovak koruna for their victory, with Alekhine earning an additional "Prize of Honor," a crystal goblet worth 1,000 Kčs, and Bogoljubov receiving a cash prize worth half Alekhine's prize. The tournament also saw the distribution of ten brilliancy prizes, including three "first prizes" which went to Alekhine for his win against Grünfeld, Nimzowitsch for his win against Yates, and Yates for his win against Alekhine.
