= Pchery =

- Municipality
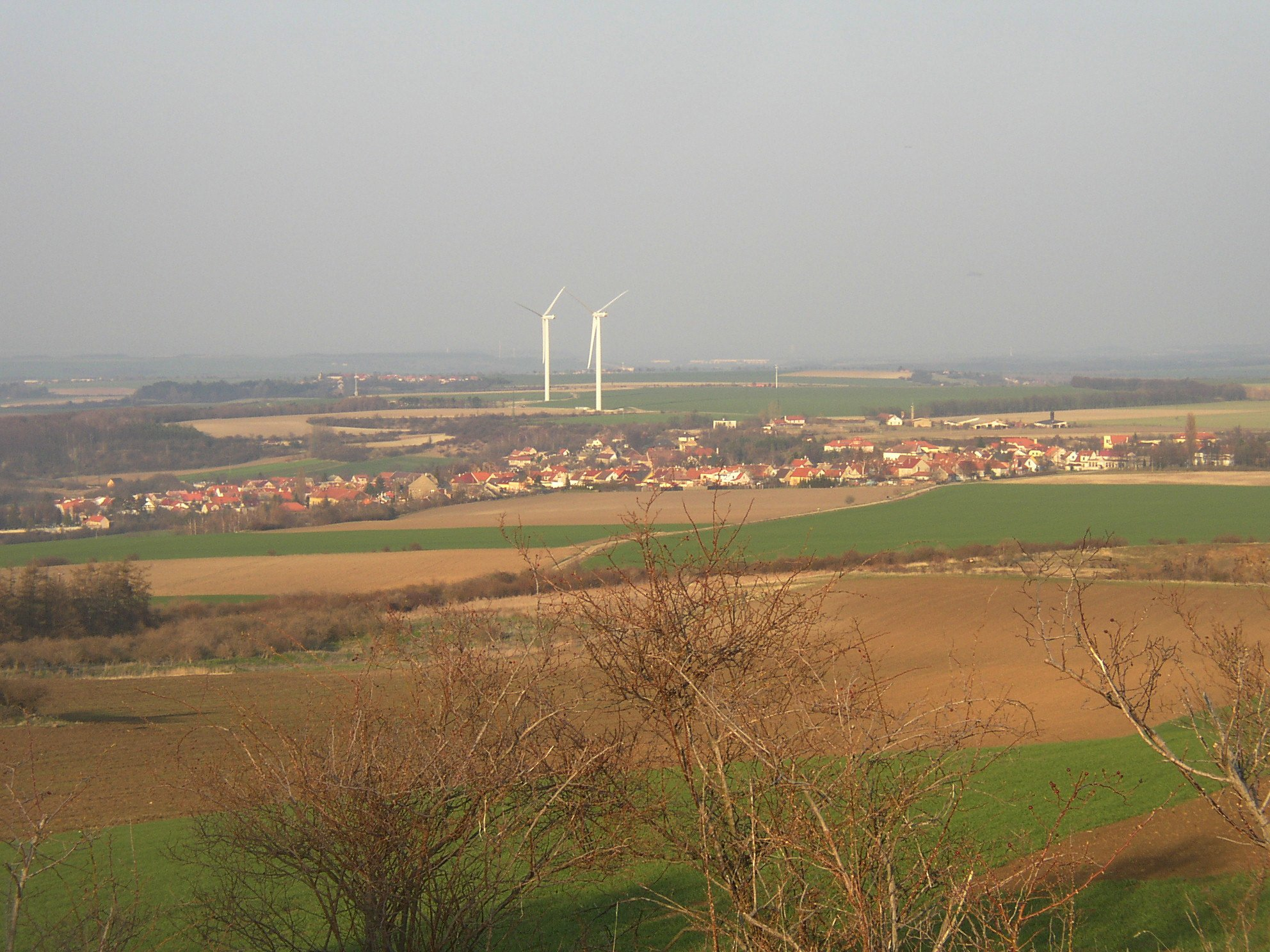
- Pchery from summit of the Vinařická hora

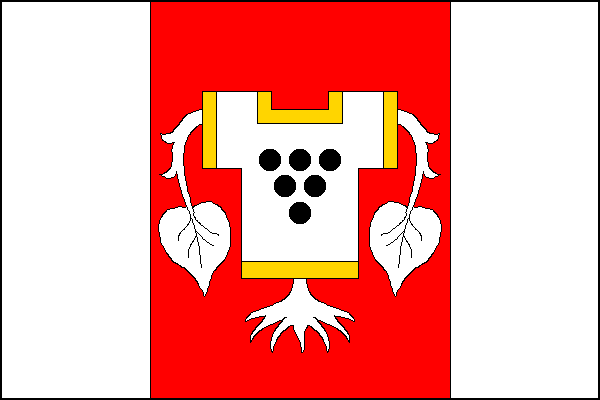
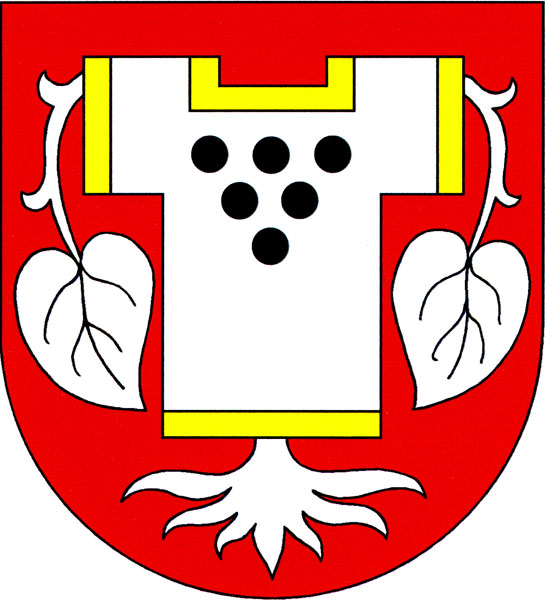
- Flag Coat of arms

- Location in the Czech Republic
- Coordinates: 50°11′29″N 14°6′51″E
- Country: Czech Republic
- Region: Central Bohemian
- District: Kladno
- First mentioned: 1222

Area
  - Total: 6.75 km^{2} (2.61 sq mi)
- Elevation: 324 m (1,063 ft)

Population (2026-01-01)
  - Total: 2,027
  - Density: 300/km^{2} (778/sq mi)
- Time zone: UTC+1 (CET)
  - Summer (DST): UTC+2 (CEST)
- Postal code: 273 08
- Website: www.obecpchery.cz

Pchery (Czech pronunciation: [ˈpxɛrɪ]) is a municipality and village in Kladno District in the Central Bohemian Region of the Czech Republic. It has about 2,000 inhabitants.

== Administrative division ==
Pchery consists of two municipal parts (in brackets population according to the 2021 census):

- Pchery (788)
- Humny (1,135)

== Etymology ==
In the oldest documents, the names Pchery and Pechry alternated. The name is probably derived either from the German word Becherer (i.e. 'wooden drinking cups maker'), or from the old German word Bëcher (i.e. 'resin collector').

== Geography ==
Pchery is located about 5 kilometres (3 mi) north of Kladno and 21 km (13 mi) northwest of Prague. It lies in a flat agricultural landscape in the Prague Plateau.

== History ==
The first written mention of Pchery is from 1222. A document from around 1228 states that it was a property of the St. George's Convent of Prague Castle.

In 1897, Theodor Mine was founded south of Pchery. The black coal mine was in operation between 1902 and 1935. The eponymous hamlet, formerly a miners' settlement which arose around the mine, also belongs to the municipal territory of Pchery.

== Demographics ==
Historical population

Year	Pop.	±%
1869	773	—
1880	922	+19.3%
1890	1,339	+45.2%
1900	2,299	+71.7%
1910	3,007	+30.8%

Year	Pop.	±%
1921	2,803	−6.8%
1930	2,890	+3.1%
1950	2,265	−21.6%
1961	2,315	+2.2%
1970	2,095	−9.5%

Year	Pop.	±%
1980	1,884	−10.1%
1991	1,669	−11.4%
2001	1,704	+2.1%
2011	1,836	+7.7%
2021	1,923	+4.7%

Source: Censuses

== Economy ==
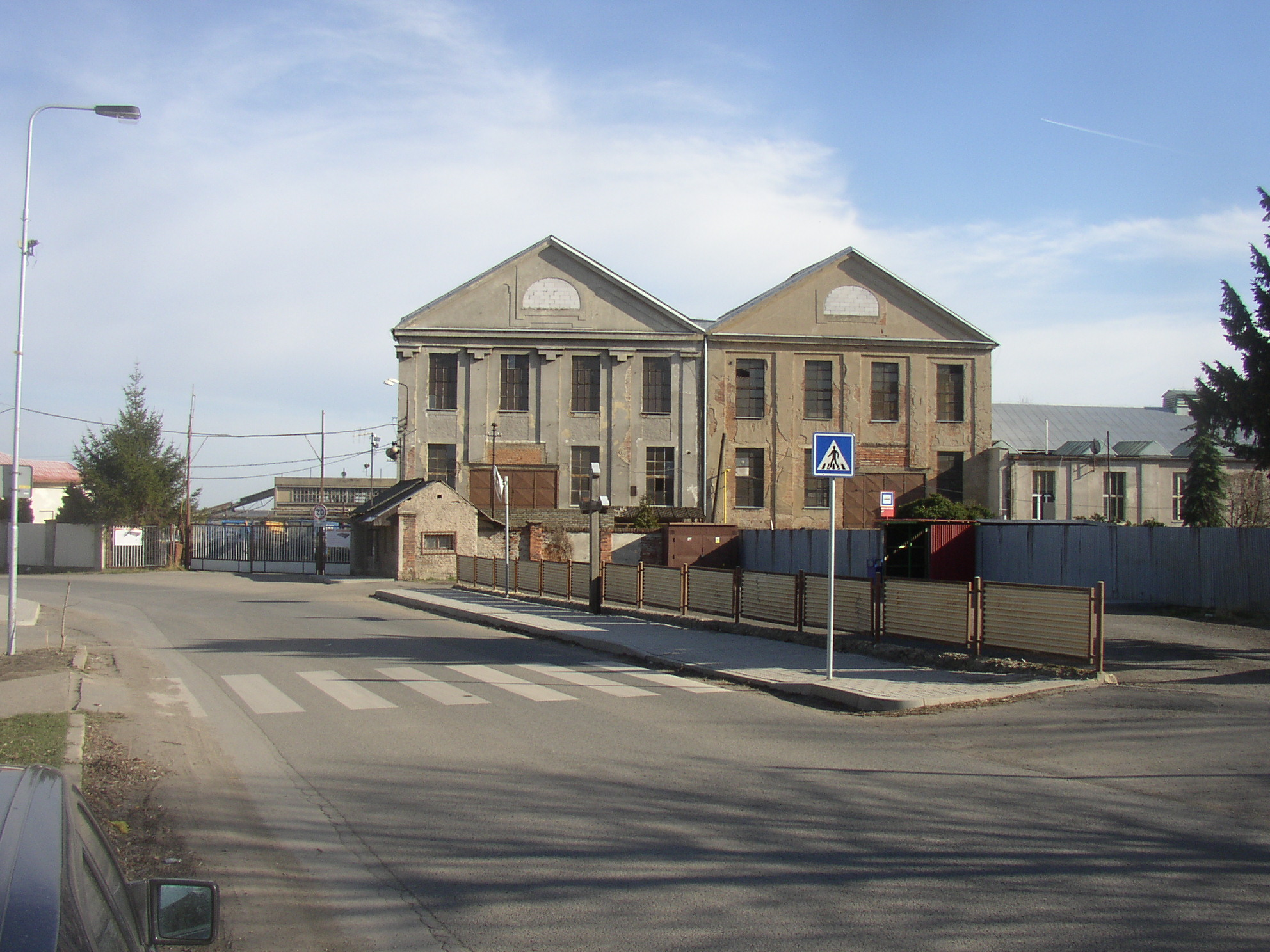
Buildings of the former Theodor Mine

A wind power plant has been operating on a field about 1 km northeast of Pchery since 1 April 2008. It consists of two towers of 88 m (289 ft) in height, each equipped with a 3 MW wind turbine supplied by Finnish manufacturer WinWinD. In 2008, it was the most powerful wind power plant in the country. As of 2020, it is the 12th most powerful wind power plant in the country, and the most powerful in the Central Bohemian Region.

== Transport ==
There are no railways or major roads passing through the municipality.

== Sights ==
The Church of Saint Stephen is the oldest monument in Pchery. It was first attested in a tithe registry in 1352. It was enlarged from one to three naves in the Baroque style in 1706. Above the church stands a belfry built in the mid-18th century.

== Notable people ==
- Oldřich Duras (1882–1957), chess grandmaster

== Gallery ==
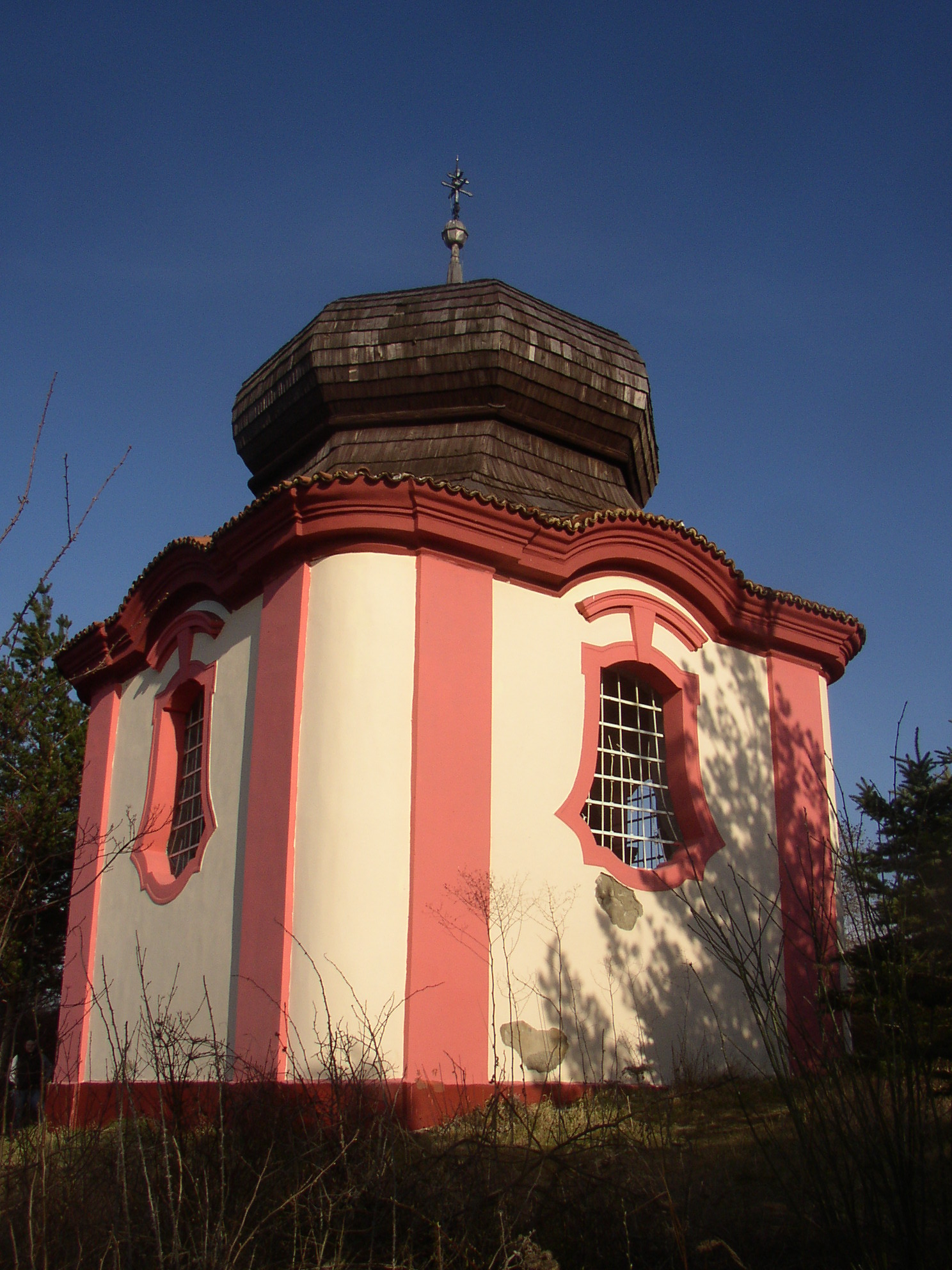
Belfry

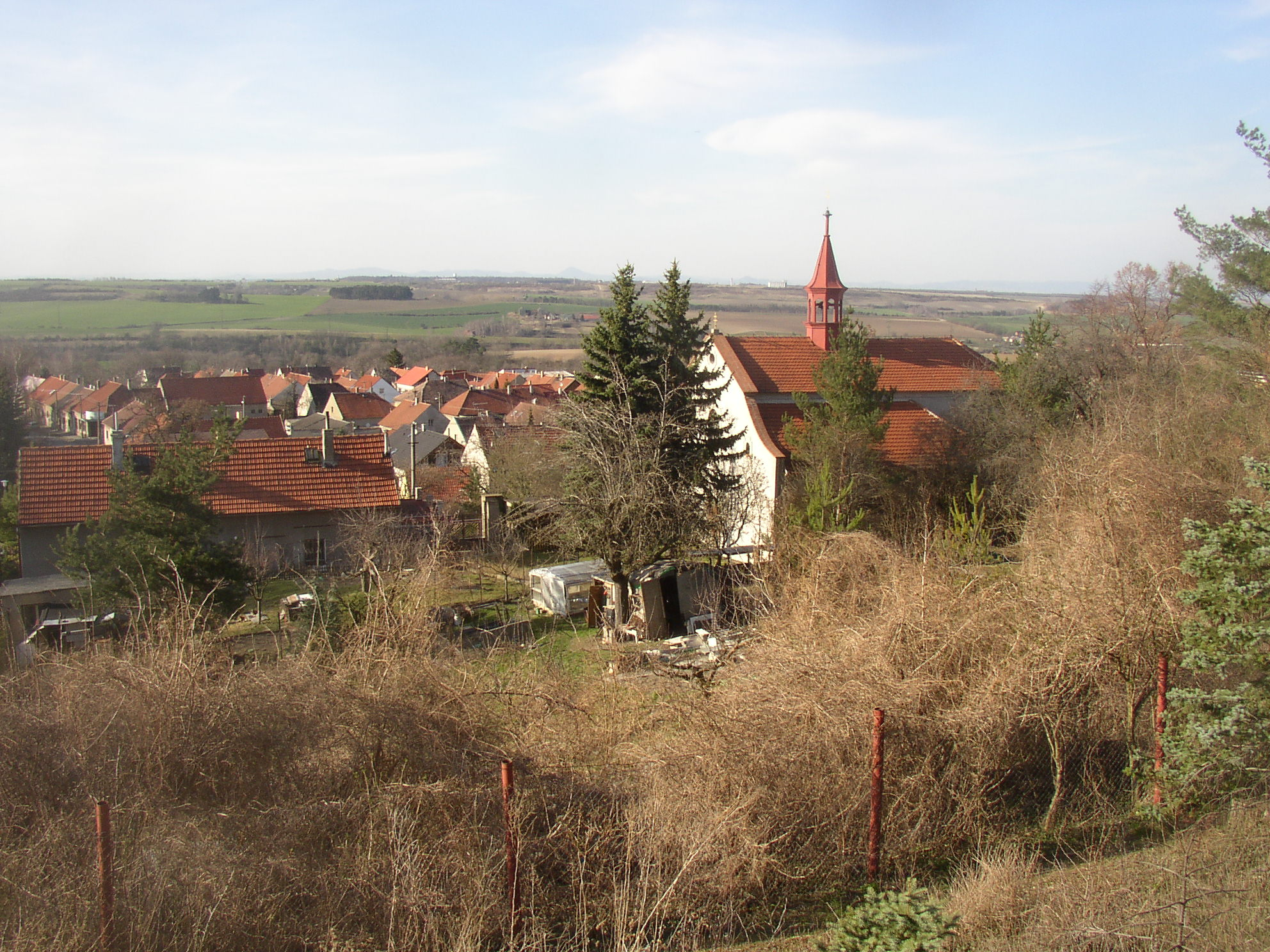
Church of Saint Stephen as seen from the belfry

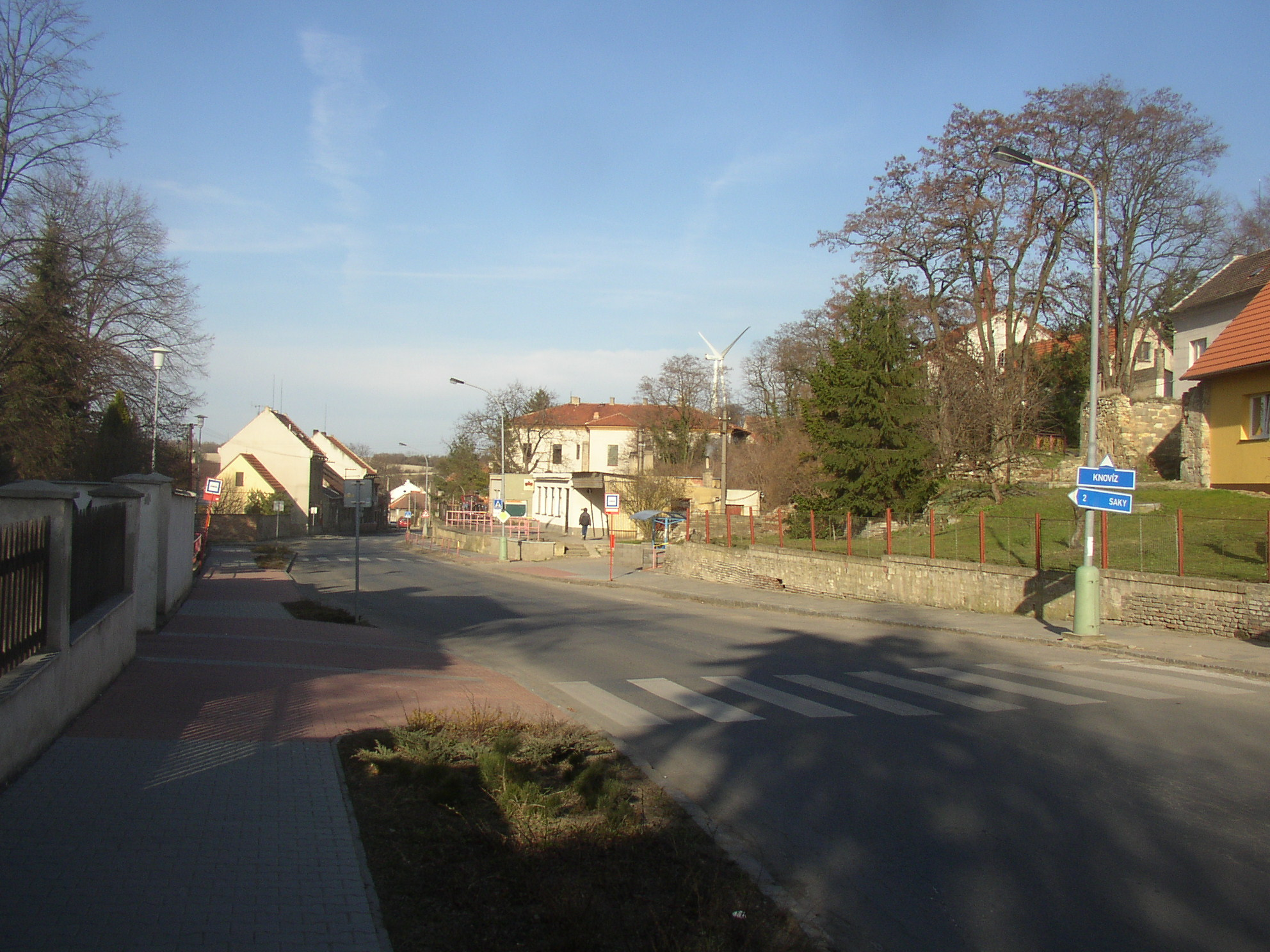
Main road in the centre of Pchery

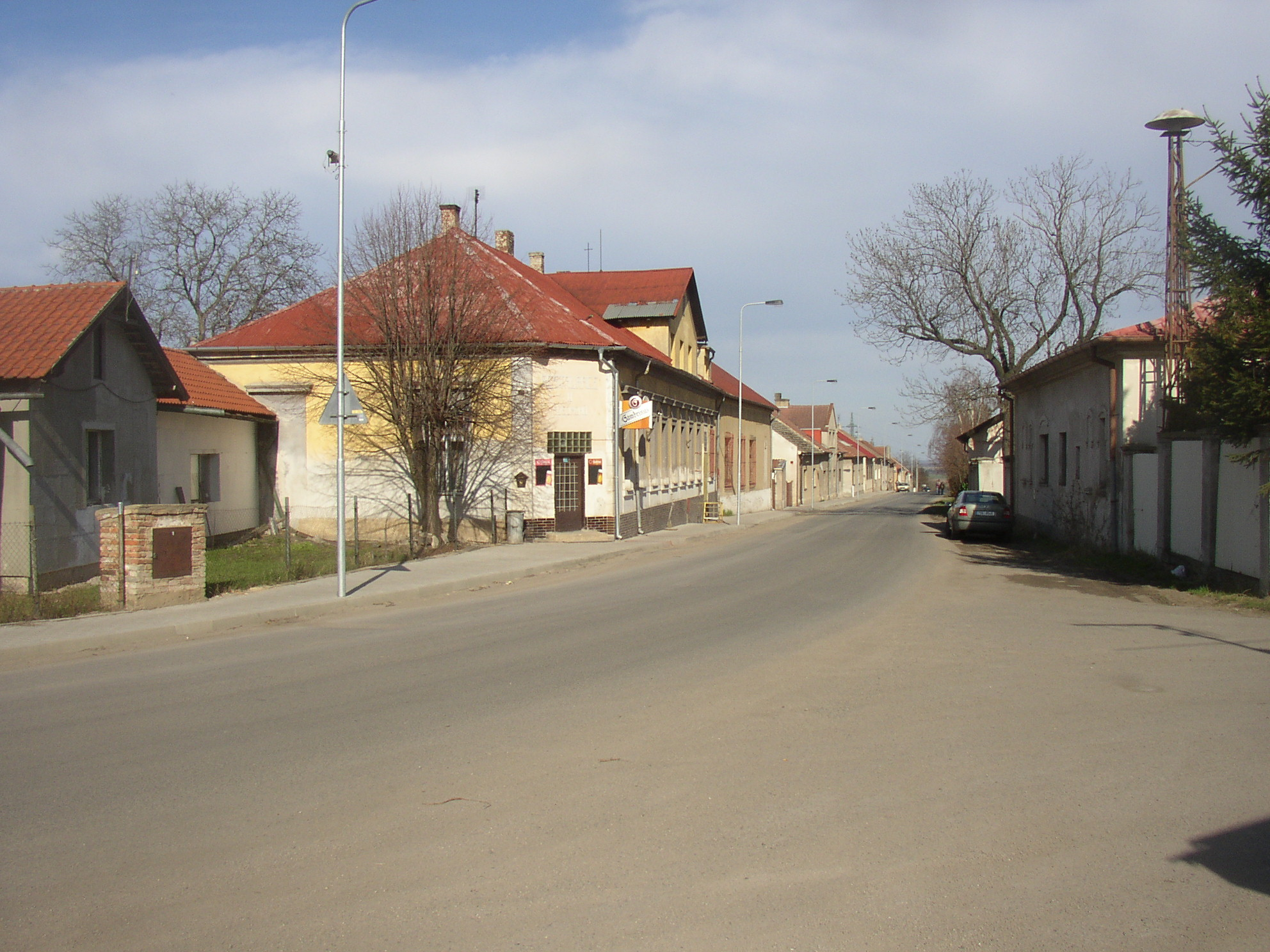
The hamlet of Theodor
