= San Sebastián chess tournament =

1911 and 1912 events in Spain

There were two important chess tournaments held in San Sebastián, Spain, in 1911 and 1912.

== San Sebastián 1911 ==
The tournament was held from February 20 to March 17, 1911. The tournament was organized by the German master Jacques Mieses and financed by the Cuban diplomat Manuel Márquez Sterling (using the pseudonym "M. Marquet"). Mieses introduced several features that shaped later international tournaments: travel expenses plus board and lodging for every participant, an explicit qualification criterion (two fourth-place finishes or better in the preceding decade), and a minimum honorarium per point for non-prize winners. Mieses and Lewitt published the tournament book in 1911; it was reprinted in 1982 and 2024.

#	Player	1	2	3	4	5	6	7	8	9	10	11	12	13	14	15	Total
1	José Raúl Capablanca (Cuba)	*	0	½	½	½	½	1	1	1	½	½	1	1	½	1	9½
2	Akiba Rubinstein (Russian Empire)	1	*	½	½	½	½	½	½	½	½	½	1	½	1	1	9
3	Milan Vidmar (Austria-Hungary)	½	½	*	0	½	½	½	1	½	½	½	1	1	1	1	9
4	Frank James Marshall (United States)	½	½	1	*	½	½	½	½	½	1	½	1	½	0	1	8½
5	Siegbert Tarrasch (German Empire)	½	½	½	½	*	½	1	1	½	0	½	½	1	0	½	7½
6	Carl Schlechter (Austria-Hungary)	½	½	½	½	½	*	½	0	½	½	½	1	½	1	½	7½
7	Aron Nimzowitsch (Russian Empire)	0	½	½	½	0	½	*	½	1	1	½	½	½	½	1	7½
8	Ossip Bernstein (Russian Empire)	0	½	0	½	0	1	½	*	1	1	1	½	0	1	0	7
9	Rudolf Spielmann (Austria-Hungary)	0	½	½	½	½	½	0	0	*	½	1	½	½	1	1	7
10	Richard Teichmann (German Empire)	½	½	½	0	1	½	0	0	½	*	½	0	½	1	1	6½
11	Géza Maróczy (Austria-Hungary)	½	½	½	½	½	½	½	0	0	½	*	1	½	½	0	6
12	Dawid Janowski (France)	0	0	0	0	½	0	½	½	½	1	0	*	1	1	1	6
13	Amos Burn (United Kingdom)	0	½	0	½	0	½	½	1	½	½	½	0	*	0	½	5
14	Oldřich Duras (Austria-Hungary)	½	0	0	1	1	0	½	0	0	0	½	0	1	*	½	5
15	Paul Saladin Leonhardt (German Empire)	0	0	0	0	½	½	0	1	0	0	1	0	½	½	*	4

The prizes were: first - 5000 Francs, second - 3000 Francs, third - 2000 Francs, fourth - 1500 Francs. Non-prize winners received 80-100 Francs per point. The brilliancy prize of 500 francs, sponsored by Baron Albert Salomon von Rothschild, was won by Capablanca for his game against Dr. Bernstein.

== San Sebastián 1912 ==
The tournament was held from February 19 to March 23, 1912. This tournament was one of five that Rubinstein won in a one-year time span (San Sebastián, Breslau, Bad Pistyan, Warsaw, and Vilna).

#	Player	1	2	3	4	5	6	7	8	9	10	11	Total
1	Akiba Rubinstein (Russian Empire)	**	½1	01	½1	½½	1½	01	11	½½	½1	½-	12½
2	Aron Nimzowitsch (Russian Empire)	½0	**	01	1½	0½	11	11	½½	½½	11	½-	12
3	Rudolf Spielmann (Austria-Hungary)	10	10	**	10	1½	½1	½½	½1	½½	1½	1-	12
4	Siegbert Tarrasch (German Empire)	½0	0½	01	**	11	01	½0	½½	11	11	1-	11½
5	Julius Perlis (Austria-Hungary)	½½	1½	0½	00	**	1½	½1	½½	½½	1½	½-	10
6	Frank James Marshall (United States)	0½	00	½0	10	0½	**	½1	1½	½½	11	1-	9½
7	Oldřich Duras (Austria-Hungary)	10	00	½½	½1	½0	½0	**	½½	½1	01	½-	8½
8	Carl Schlechter (Austria-Hungary)	00	½½	½0	½½	½½	0½	½½	**	½½	1½	½-	8
9	Richard Teichmann (German Empire)	½½	½½	½½	00	½½	½½	½0	½½	**	½½	½-	8
10	Paul Saladin Leonhardt (German Empire)	½0	00	0½	00	0½	00	10	0½	½½	**	1-	5
11	Leó Forgács (Austria-Hungary)	½-	½-	0-	0-	½-	0-	½-	½-	½-	0-	**	3

Forgacs only played the first half tournament and forfeited his last ten games.

The prizes were: first - 5000 Francs, second - 3000 Francs, third - 2000 Francs, fourth - 1500 Francs. Non-prize winners received 100 Francs per point.
