= Franz G. Jacob =

German chess player

Franz G. Jacob (Jakob) (1870–?) was a German chess master.

Born in Strasbourg, Alsace (around the time it was transferred from French to German control), he took 16th at Munich 1900 (the 12th DSB Congress, Géza Maróczy, Harry Pillsbury and Carl Schlechter won), tied for 27-28th in the Ostend 1907 chess tournament (Masters' Tournament, Ossip Bernstein and Akiba Rubinstein won), tied for 9-12th at Düsseldorf 1908 (the 16th DSB Congress, Frank Marshall won), and withdrew after round 6 at Hamburg 1910 (the 17th DSB Congress).
