= Walter Robinow =

German chess organizer

Walter Robinow (15 August 1867 – 15 July 1938) was a German chess functionary and organizer.

In 1908, he became the President of the Hamburg Chess Club (Hamburger SK), and was a main organizer of the Hamburg 1910 chess tournament (the 17th DSB Congress). In 1914, he was appointed a Vice President of the German Chess Federation (DSB). After World War I, he was the fifth President of the German Chess Federation (Deutschen Schachbundes, DSB) from 1920 to 1933. Among others, he had organized the 24th DSB Kongress at Breslau 1925, the first international congress after the war.

In April 1933, due to Nazi Machtergreifung, Robinow had to resign his chairmanship of the Deutschen Schachbundes and the Hamburger Schachklubs, because of his Jewish origin. One year later, the DSB would be dissolved and replaced with the Nazi-affiliated Großdeutscher Schachbund, which allowed only players of Aryan origin as defined by the Nazis to play.
