= International Masters =

International Masters may refer to:

- International Master (IM), a FIDE title for a strong chess player
- International Masters League, a Twenty20 cricket competition
- International Masters, later renamed British Open, a snooker tournament
  - 1982 International Masters
  - 1983 International Masters
  - 1984 International Masters

== See also ==
- International Masters Games Association, governors of the World Masters Games
