= Round-robin tournament =

Type of sports competition

Example of a round-robin tournament with ten participants

A round-robin tournament or all-play-all tournament is a competition format in which each contestant meets every other participant, usually in turn. A round-robin contrasts with an elimination tournament, where participants are eliminated after a certain number of wins or losses, as well as with a Swiss-system tournament, where participants are matched according to their running score.

== Terminology ==
The term round-robin is derived from French: rond ('round') ruban ('ribbon') meant a petition signed in circular format, so no name is first or last. Over time, "ruban" became idiomized or corrupted to "robin".

In a single round-robin schedule, each participant plays every other participant once. If each participant plays all others twice, this is frequently called a double round-robin. Equivalent terms are seldom used when all participants play one another more than twice, and rarely when one participant plays others an unequal number of times, as is the case in almost all of the major North American professional sports leagues.

In the United Kingdom, a round-robin tournament has been called an American tournament in sports such as tennis or billiards which usually have single-elimination (or "knockout") tournaments, although this is now rarely done.

A round-robin tournament with four players is sometimes called "quad" or "foursome".

== Applications ==
=== Pure round-robin ===
In sports with a large number of competitive matches per season, double round-robins with no post-seasons are common. Most domestic association football leagues in the world, as well as the CONMEBOL qualifiers for the FIFA World Cup, are organized on a double pure round-robin basis, in which every team plays all others in its league once at home and once away, with no conferences or post-seasons. The team with most points after the round-robin is declared the champion. If more than one team has the same amount of points, the most common tiebreakers are aggregate scores in matches between the tied teams, and aggregate scores across all matches in the tournament.

Triple or quadruple round-robins were traditionally used in leagues with few teams, including the Danish Superliga and the Scottish Premiership. Such leagues later changed to a modified triple round-robin, where the top teams enter a final phase to play one additional match against each other.

The format is also very common in rugby union, where it is used for domestic leagues and in national-team continental tournaments.

There are also round-robin cricket, bridge, chess, draughts, go, ice hockey, curling, and Scrabble tournaments. The World Chess Championship decided in 2005 and in 2007 on an eight-player double round-robin tournament where each player faces every other player once as white and once as black.

=== Other round-robin formats ===
Frequently, pool stages within a wider tournament are conducted on a round-robin basis, among them qualification for major tournaments such as the FIFA World Cup and the continental tournaments (e.g. UEFA European Championship, CONCACAF Gold Cup, AFC Asian Cup, CONMEBOL Copa América and CAF Cup of Nations).

Group tournaments rankings usually go by number of matches won and drawn, with any of a variety of tiebreaker criteria.

Examples with single round-robin scheduling in groups include the FIFA World Cup, UEFA European Football Championship, and UEFA Cup (2004–2009) in football, Super Rugby (rugby union) in the Southern Hemisphere during its past iterations as Super 12 and Super 14 (but not in its later 15- and 18-team formats), the Cricket World Cup along with Indian Premier League, a major Twenty20 Cricket tournament, and many American football college conferences, such as the Conference USA (which currently has 9 members). The group phases of the Copa Libertadores are contested as a double round-robin, as are most basketball leagues outside the United States, including the regular season of the EuroLeague (as well as its former Top 16 phase); the United Football League has used a double round-robin for both its 2009 and 2010 seasons.

The ATP and WTA Finals, season ending tennis tournaments, also use a round robin format prior to the semi final stage.

In a more extreme example, the KBO League in baseball plays a 16-fold round robin before proceeding to the post-season, with each of the 10 teams playing each other 16 times for a total of 144 games per team, while the LIDOM (Baseball Winter League in the Dominican Republic) plays an 18-fold round robin as a semi final tournament between four classified teams.

There have been several major international cricket tournaments held in this format including ICC events, including a grouped format in the 2025 ICC Champions Trophy.

In competitive debating, a specialised form of round-robin is sometimes used as debates consist of 4 teams in each room. The most notable example of this is the HWS Round Robin. Round robins of this kind can be considered as a special case of the Social Golfer Problem.

== Evaluation ==
=== Advantages ===
The champion in a round-robin tournament is the contestant that wins the most games, except when draws are possible.

In theory, a round-robin tournament is the fairest way to determine the champion from among a known and fixed number of contestants. Each contestant, whether player or team, has equal chances against all other opponents because there is no prior seeding of contestants that will preclude a match between any given pair. The element of luck is seen to be reduced as compared to a knockout system since one or two bad performances need not ruin a competitor's chance of ultimate victory. Final records of participants are more accurate, in the sense that they represent the results over a longer period against the same opposition.

The system is also better for ranking all participants, not just determining the winner. This is helpful to determine the final rank of all competitors, from strongest to weakest, for purposes of qualification for another stage or competition as well as for prize money.

In team sports, the round-robin major league champions are generally regarded as the "best" team in the land, rather than the cup winners, whose tournaments usually follow a single-elimination format.

Moreover, in tournaments such as the FIFA or ICC World Cups, a first round stage consisting of a number of mini round robins between groups of 4 teams guards against the possibility of a team travelling possibly thousands of miles only to be eliminated after just one poor performance in a straight knockout system. The top one, two, or occasionally three teams in these groups then proceed to a straight knockout stage for the remainder of the tournament.

In the circle of death it is possible that no champion emerges from a round-robin tournament, even if there is no draw, but most sports have tie-breaker systems which resolve this.

=== Disadvantages ===
Round-robins can suffer from being too long compared to other tournament types, and with later scheduled games potentially not having any substantial meaning. They may also require tie-breaking procedures.

Swiss-system tournaments attempt to combine elements of the round-robin and elimination formats, to provide a worthy champion using fewer rounds than a round-robin, while allowing draws and losses.

==== Tournament length ====
The main disadvantage of a round robin tournament is the time needed to complete it. Unlike a knockout tournament where half of the participants are eliminated after each round, a round robin requires up to the same number of rounds as the number of participants. (If the number of participants is even, then usually a round robin only requires one less round.) For instance, a tournament of 16 teams can be completed in just 4 rounds (i.e. 15 matches) in a knockout format; a double elimination tournament format requires 30 (or 31) matches, but a round-robin would require 15 rounds (i.e. 120 matches) to finish if each competitor faces each other once.

Other issues stem from the difference between the theoretical fairness of the round robin format and practice in a real event. Since the victor is gradually arrived at through multiple rounds of play, teams who perform poorly, who might have been quickly eliminated from title contention, are forced to play out their remaining games. Thus games are played late in the competition between competitors with no remaining chance of success. Moreover, some later matches will pair one competitor who has something left to play for against another who does not. It may also be possible for a competitor to play the strongest opponents in a round robin in quick succession while others play them intermittently with weaker opposition. This asymmetry means that playing the same opponents is not necessarily completely equitable.

There is also no scheduled showcase final match unless (by coincidence) two competitors meet in the last match of the tournament, with the result of that match determining the championship. A notable instance of such an event was the 1950 FIFA World Cup match between Uruguay and Brazil.

==== Qualified teams ====
Further issues arise where a round-robin is used as a qualifying round within a larger tournament. A competitor already qualified for the next stage before its last game may either not try hard (in order to conserve resources for the next phase) or even deliberately lose (if the scheduled next-phase opponent for a lower-placed qualifier is perceived to be easier than for a higher-placed one).

Four pairs in the 2012 Olympics Women's doubles badminton, having qualified for the next round, were ejected from the competition for attempting to lose in the round robin stage to avoid compatriots and better ranked opponents. The round robin stage at the Olympics was a new introduction, and these potential problems were readily known prior to the tournament; changes were made prior to the next Olympics to prevent a repeat of these events.

==== Circle of death ====
Another disadvantage, especially in smaller round-robins, is the "circle of death", where teams cannot be separated on a head-to-head record. For instance, in a three-team round-robin, where A defeats B, B defeats C, and C defeats A, all three competitors will have a record of one win and one loss, and a tiebreaker will need to be used to separate the teams. The circle of death famously happened during the 1994 FIFA World Cup Group E, where all four teams finished with a record of one win, one draw, and one loss. This phenomenon is analogous to the Condorcet paradox in voting theory.

== Scheduling algorithm ==
If $n$ is the number of competitors, a pure round robin tournament requires
$$\begin{matrix} \frac{n}{2} \end{matrix}(n - 1)$$
games. If $n$ is even, then in each of $(n - 1)$ rounds,
$$\begin{matrix} \frac{n}{2} \end{matrix}$$
games can be run concurrently, provided there exist sufficient resources (e.g. courts for a tennis tournament). If $n$ is odd, there will be $n$ rounds, each with
$$\begin{matrix} \frac{n - 1}{2} \end{matrix}$$
games, and one competitor having no game in that round.

=== Circle method ===
The circle method is a simple algorithm to create a schedule for a round-robin tournament. All competitors are assigned to numbers, and then paired in the first round:

Round 1. (1 plays 14, 2 plays 13, ... )
| 1 | 2 | 3 | 4 | 5 | 6 | 7 |
| 14 | 13 | 12 | 11 | 10 | 9 | 8 |

Next, one of the competitors in the first or last column of the table is fixed (number one in this example) and the others are rotated one position in a fixed direction(clockwise in this example):

Round 2. (1 plays 13, 14 plays 12, ... )
| 1 | 14 | 2 | 3 | 4 | 5 | 6 |
| 13 | 12 | 11 | 10 | 9 | 8 | 7 |

Round 3. (1 plays 12, 13 plays 11, ... )
| 1 | 13 | 14 | 2 | 3 | 4 | 5 |
| 12 | 11 | 10 | 9 | 8 | 7 | 6 |

This is repeated until when the next iteration would lead back to the initial pairings:

Round 13. (1 plays 2, 3 plays 14, ... )
| 1 | 3 | 4 | 5 | 6 | 7 | 8 |
| 2 | 14 | 13 | 12 | 11 | 10 | 9 |

With an even number $n$ of competitors this algorithm realizes every possible combination of them (equivalently, that all pairs realized are pairwise different).

First, the algorithm obviously realizes every pair of competitors if one of them equals $1$ (the non-moving competitor).

Next, for pairs of non-$1$ competitors, let their distance be the number $k<\frac{n}{2}$ of times the rotation has to be carried out in order that one competitor arrives at the position the other had.

In the example given ($n=14$), $2$ has distance $1$ to $3$ and to $14$ and it has distance $6$ to $8$ and to $9$.

In a round, a non-leftmost position (not including $1$) can only be taken by competitors of a fixed distance. In round $1$ of the example, in the second position competitor $2$ plays against $13$, their distance is $2$. In round $2$, this position is held by competitors $14$ and $12$, also having distance $2$, etc. Similarly, the next position ($3$ against $12$ in round $1$, $2$ against $11$ in round $2$, etc.) can only hold distance-$4$ competitors.

For every $k<\frac{n}{2}$, there are exactly $n-1$ pairs of distance $k$. There are $n-1$ rounds and they all realize one distance-$k$ pair at the same position. Clearly, these pairs are pairwise different. The conclusion is that every distance-$k$ pair is realized.

This holds for every $k$, hence, every pair is realized.

If there are an odd number of competitors, a dummy competitor can be added, whose scheduled opponent in a given round does not play and has a bye. The schedule can therefore be computed as though the dummy were an ordinary player, either fixed or rotating.

Instead of rotating one position, any number relatively prime to $(n-1)$ will generate a complete schedule. The upper and lower rows can indicate home/away in sports, white/black in chess, etc.; to ensure fairness, this must alternate between rounds since competitor 1 is always on the first row. If, say, competitors 3 and 8 were unable to fulfil their fixture in the third round, it would need to be rescheduled outside the other rounds, since both competitors would already be facing other opponents in those rounds. More complex scheduling constraints may require more complex algorithms. This schedule is applied in chess and draughts tournaments of rapid games, where players physically move round a table. In France this is called the Carousel-Berger system (Système Rutch-Berger).

The schedule can also be used for "asynchronous" round-robin tournaments where all games take place at different times (for example, because there is only one venue). The games are played from left to right in each round, and from the first round to the last. When the number of competitors is even, this schedule performs well with respect to quality and fairness measures such as the amount of rest between games. On the other hand, when the number of competitors is odd, it does not perform so well and a different schedule is superior with respect to these measures.

=== Berger tables ===
Alternatively Berger tables, named after the Austrian chess master Johann Berger, are widely used in the planning of tournaments. Berger published the pairing tables in his two Schach-Jahrbücher (Chess Annals), with due reference to its inventor Richard Schurig.

| Round 1 | 1 – 14 | 2 – 13 | 3 – 12 | 4 – 11 | 5 – 10 | 6 – 9 | 7 – 8 |
| Round 2 | 14 – 8 | 9 – 7 | 10 – 6 | 11 – 5 | 12 – 4 | 13 – 3 | 1 – 2 |
| Round 3 | 2 – 14 | 3 – 1 | 4 – 13 | 5 – 12 | 6 – 11 | 7 – 10 | 8 – 9 |
| ... | ... | | | | | | |
| Round 13 | 7 – 14 | 8 – 6 | 9 – 5 | 10 – 4 | 11 – 3 | 12 – 2 | 13 – 1 |

This constitutes a schedule where player 14 has a fixed position, and all other players are rotated counterclockwise $\frac{n}{2}$ positions. This schedule is easily generated manually. To construct the next round, the last player, number 8 in the first round, moves to the head of the table, followed by player 9 against player 7, player 10 against 6, until player 1 against player 2. Arithmetically, this equates to adding $\frac{n}{2}$ to the previous row, with the exception of player $n$. When the result of the addition is greater than $(n-1)$, then subtract $(n-1)$ from the sum.

This schedule can also be represented as a (n − 1, n − 1) table, expressing a round in which players meets each other. For example, player 7 plays against player 11 in round 4. If a player meets itself, then this shows a bye or a game against player n. All games in a round constitutes a diagonal in the table.

Diagonal Scheme
| × | 2 | 3 | 4 | 5 | 6 | 7 | 8 | 9 | 10 | 11 | 12 | 13 | 1 | 2 | 3 | 4 | 5 | 6 | 7 | 8 | 9 | 10 | 11 | 12 | 13 |
|---|---|---|---|---|---|---|---|---|---|---|---|---|---|---|---|---|---|---|---|---|---|---|---|---|---|
| 1 | | | | | | | | | | | | | 1 | 2 | 3 | 4 | 5 | 6 | 7 | 8 | 9 | 10 | 11 | 12 | 13 |
| 2 | | | | | | | | | | | | 1 | 2 | 3 | 4 | 5 | 6 | 7 | 8 | 9 | 10 | 11 | 12 | 13 | |
| 3 | | | | | | | | | | | 1 | 2 | 3 | 4 | 5 | 6 | 7 | 8 | 9 | 10 | 11 | 12 | 13 | | |
| 4 | | | | | | | | | | 1 | 2 | 3 | 4 | 5 | 6 | 7 | 8 | 9 | 10 | 11 | 12 | 13 | | | |
| 5 | | | | | | | | | 1 | 2 | 3 | 4 | 5 | 6 | 7 | 8 | 9 | 10 | 11 | 12 | 13 | | | | |
| 6 | | | | | | | | 1 | 2 | 3 | 4 | 5 | 6 | 7 | 8 | 9 | 10 | 11 | 12 | 13 | | | | | |
| 7 | | | | | | | 1 | 2 | 3 | 4 | 5 | 6 | 7 | 8 | 9 | 10 | 11 | 12 | 13 | | | | | | |
| 8 | | | | | | 1 | 2 | 3 | 4 | 5 | 6 | 7 | 8 | 9 | 10 | 11 | 12 | 13 | | | | | | | |
| 9 | | | | | 1 | 2 | 3 | 4 | 5 | 6 | 7 | 8 | 9 | 10 | 11 | 12 | 13 | | | | | | | | |
| 10 | | | | 1 | 2 | 3 | 4 | 5 | 6 | 7 | 8 | 9 | 10 | 11 | 12 | 13 | | | | | | | | | |
| 11 | | | 1 | 2 | 3 | 4 | 5 | 6 | 7 | 8 | 9 | 10 | 11 | 12 | 13 | | | | | | | | | | |
| 12 | | 1 | 2 | 3 | 4 | 5 | 6 | 7 | 8 | 9 | 10 | 11 | 12 | 13 | | | | | | | | | | | |
| 13 | 1 | 2 | 3 | 4 | 5 | 6 | 7 | 8 | 9 | 10 | 11 | 12 | 13 | | | | | | | | | | | | |

Round Robin Schedule
| × | 1 | 2 | 3 | 4 | 5 | 6 | 7 | 8 | 9 | 10 | 11 | 12 | 13 |
|---|---|---|---|---|---|---|---|---|---|---|---|---|---|
| 1 | 1 | 2 | 3 | 4 | 5 | 6 | 7 | 8 | 9 | 10 | 11 | 12 | 13 |
| 2 | 2 | 3 | 4 | 5 | 6 | 7 | 8 | 9 | 10 | 11 | 12 | 13 | 1 |
| 3 | 3 | 4 | 5 | 6 | 7 | 8 | 9 | 10 | 11 | 12 | 13 | 1 | 2 |
| 4 | 4 | 5 | 6 | 7 | 8 | 9 | 10 | 11 | 12 | 13 | 1 | 2 | 3 |
| 5 | 5 | 6 | 7 | 8 | 9 | 10 | 11 | 12 | 13 | 1 | 2 | 3 | 4 |
| 6 | 6 | 7 | 8 | 9 | 10 | 11 | 12 | 13 | 1 | 2 | 3 | 4 | 5 |
| 7 | 7 | 8 | 9 | 10 | 11 | 12 | 13 | 1 | 2 | 3 | 4 | 5 | 6 |
| 8 | 8 | 9 | 10 | 11 | 12 | 13 | 1 | 2 | 3 | 4 | 5 | 6 | 7 |
| 9 | 9 | 10 | 11 | 12 | 13 | 1 | 2 | 3 | 4 | 5 | 6 | 7 | 8 |
| 10 | 10 | 11 | 12 | 13 | 1 | 2 | 3 | 4 | 5 | 6 | 7 | 8 | 9 |
| 11 | 11 | 12 | 13 | 1 | 2 | 3 | 4 | 5 | 6 | 7 | 8 | 9 | 10 |
| 12 | 12 | 13 | 1 | 2 | 3 | 4 | 5 | 6 | 7 | 8 | 9 | 10 | 11 |
| 13 | 13 | 1 | 2 | 3 | 4 | 5 | 6 | 7 | 8 | 9 | 10 | 11 | 12 |

The above schedule can also be represented by a graph, as shown below:

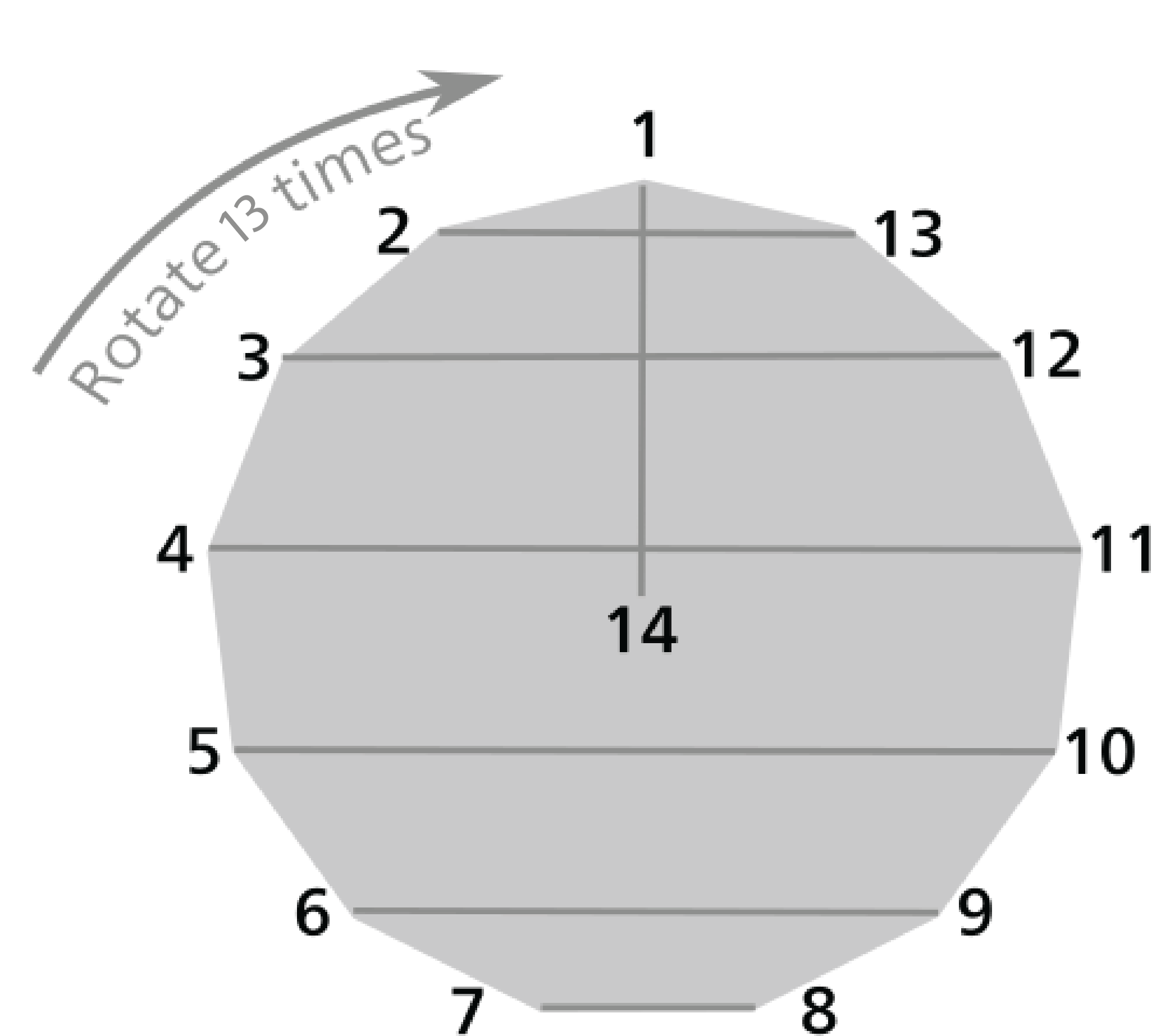
Round Robin Schedule Span Diagram

Both the graph and the schedule were reported by Édouard Lucas in as a recreational mathematics puzzle. Lucas, who describes the method as simple and ingenious, attributes the solution to Felix Walecki, a teacher at Lycée Condorcet. Lucas also included an alternative solution by means of a sliding puzzle.

=== Mnemonic ===
To easily remember this method, the following mnemonic can be used. Starting from the first round,

                       venue = 1  
 ╭────────────────────────────────────────────────────┐
1—ω >>> 2—13 >>> 3—12 >>> 4—11 >>> 5—10 >>> 6—9 >>> 7—8

the next round is constructed:

ω—8 >>> 9—7 >>> 10—6 >>> 11—5 >>> 12—4 >>> 13—3 >>> 1—2

and then,

2—ω >>> 3—1 >>> 4—13 >>> 5—12 >>> 6—11 >>> 7—10 >>> 8—9
ω—9 >>> ...

If the number of players is odd, the player in the first venue gets a bye. If the number is even, an added player (ω) becomes the opponent.

=== Original construction of pairing tables by Richard Schurig (1886) ===
For an even number $n$ or an odd number $n - 1$ of competitors, Schurig builds a table with $n/2$ vertical rows and $n-1$ horizontal rows. Then he populates it starting from the top left corner by repeating the sequence of numbers from 1 up to $n-1$. Here is an example table for 7 or 8 competitors:

| Round 1 | 1 | 2 | 3 | 4 |
| Round 2 | 5 | 6 | 7 | 1 |
| Round 3 | 2 | 3 | 4 | 5 |
| Round 4 | 6 | 7 | 1 | 2 |
| Round 5 | 3 | 4 | 5 | 6 |
| Round 6 | 7 | 1 | 2 | 3 |
| Round 7 | 4 | 5 | 6 | 7 |

Then to get the opponents a second table is constructed. Every horizontal row $x$ is populated with the same numbers as row $x + 1$ in the previous table (the last row is populated with numbers from the first row in the original table), but in the reverse order (from right to left).

| Round 1 | – 1 | – 7 | – 6 | – 5 |
| Round 2 | – 5 | – 4 | – 3 | – 2 |
| Round 3 | – 2 | – 1 | – 7 | – 6 |
| Round 4 | – 6 | – 5 | – 4 | – 3 |
| Round 5 | – 3 | – 2 | – 1 | – 7 |
| Round 6 | – 7 | – 6 | – 5 | – 4 |
| Round 7 | – 4 | – 3 | – 2 | – 1 |

By merging above tables:

| Round 1 | 1 – 1 | 2 – 7 | 3 – 6 | 4 – 5 |
| Round 2 | 5 – 5 | 6 – 4 | 7 – 3 | 1 – 2 |
| Round 3 | 2 – 2 | 3 – 1 | 4 – 7 | 5 – 6 |
| Round 4 | 6 – 6 | 7 – 5 | 1 – 4 | 2 – 3 |
| Round 5 | 3 – 3 | 4 – 2 | 5 – 1 | 6 – 7 |
| Round 6 | 7 – 7 | 1 – 6 | 2 – 5 | 3 – 4 |
| Round 7 | 4 – 4 | 5 – 3 | 6 – 2 | 7 – 1 |

Then the first column is updated: if the number of competitors is even, player number $n$ is alternatingly substituted for the first and second positions, whereas if the number of competitors is odd a bye is used instead.

The pairing tables were published as an annex concerning the arrangements for the holding of master tournaments. Schurig did not provide a proof nor a motivation for his algorithm.

== See also ==
- Group tournament ranking system, including details of tie-breaking systems
- Combinatorial design, a balanced tournament design of order n (a BTD(n))
- Tournament (graph theory), mathematical model of a round-robin tournament
- McMahon system tournament, a variation of the Swiss system that incorporates pre-tournament rankings to prevent early lopsided pairings
- Shaughnessy playoff system, a type of single-elimination tournament featuring four teams
- McIntyre system, a series of tournament formats that combine features of single- and double-elimination tournaments
- Duplicate bridge movements
- List of round-robin chess tournaments
- Scheveningen system, where each member of one team plays each member of the other
- Copeland's method
- Condorcet method
- Condorcet criterion
- Three points for a win, for round robin implications of different scoring systems
