= Milan Vidmar =

Slovenian chess grandmaster (1885–1962)

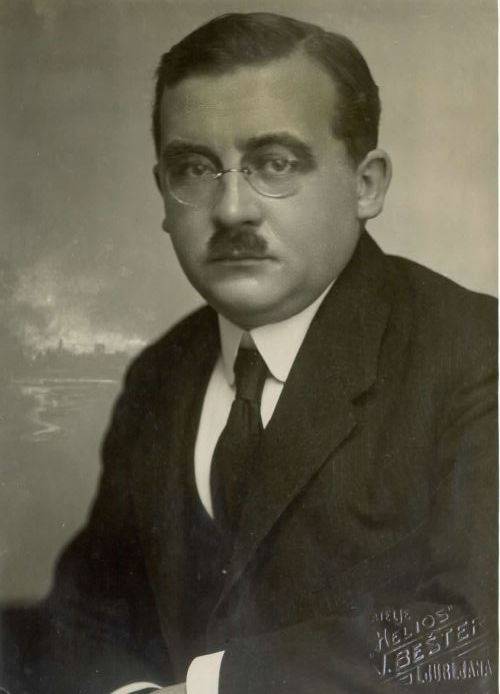
- Vidmar c. 1935
- Born: 22 June 1885; Ljubljana, Austria-Hungary
- Died: 9 October 1962 (aged 77)
- Education: University of Vienna
- Title: Grandmaster (1950)
- Children: Milan Jr.

Milan Vidmar (pronounced [ˈmíːlan ˈʋìːdmaɾ]; 22 June 1885 – 9 October 1962) was a Yugoslav-Slovenian electrical engineer, chess player, chess theorist, and writer. He was among the top dozen chess players in the world from 1910 to 1930 and in 1950, was among the inaugural recipients of the title International Grandmaster from FIDE. Vidmar was a specialist in power transformers and transmission of electric current.

== Early life, family, and education ==
He was born in a middle-class family in Ljubljana, Austria-Hungary (now in Slovenia). He began to study mechanical engineering in 1902, and he graduated in 1907 from the University of Vienna. He got his doctor's degree in 1911 from the Technical faculty in Vienna. The study of electrical engineering at the Technical faculty did not begin until 1904, so Vidmar had to take special examinations in the field basics.

Between 1912 and 1913 he worked at the famous Ganz Works in Budapest as the assistant of Ottó Titusz Bláthy, one of the inventors and foremost experts on transformers which in turn became Vidmar's specialisation too.

He was a professor at the University of Ljubljana, a member of the Slovenian Academy of Arts and Sciences, and the founder of the Faculty of Electrical Engineering. Between 1928 and 1929 he was the 10th chancellor of the University of Ljubljana. In 1948 he established the Institute of Electrotechnics that now bears his name.

== Chess career ==
Vidmar was also a top-class chess player, probably one of the best dozen players in the world from 1910 to 1930, all the while remaining an amateur. He was awarded the Grandmaster title by FIDE in 1950, when titles were introduced.

His successes include high places at some of the top chess tournaments of his time, e.g. sixth at Carlsbad 1907, third at Prague 1908, first at Gothenburg 1909 (the 7th Nordic Chess Championship), second at San Sebastián 1911 with Akiba Rubinstein behind José Raúl Capablanca, first at Budapest 1912, second at Mannheim 1914, first at Vienna and Berlin in 1918, second at Košice 1928, third at London 1922, shared first with Alexander Alekhine at Hastings 1925/26, third at Semmering 1926, fourth at New York 1927, fourth at London 1927, shared fifth at Carlsbad 1929, tied for 4–7th at Bled 1931, tied for 3–6th at Stuttgart 1939, second behind Max Euwe at Budapest 1940, first at Basel 1952.

Vidmar represented Yugoslavia in the Chess Olympiads of Prague 1931 (board one, 8½/16) and Stockholm 1935 (board one, 8½/14).

Vidmar became an arbiter, earning the title of International Arbiter from FIDE, and was chief referee for the 1948 World Chess Championship in The Hague/Moscow.

== Major writings ==
Books on chess:

- Pol stoletja ob šahovnici (Half a century at the chessboard) (Ljubljana 1951)
- Šah (Chess)
- Razgovori o šahu z začetnikom (Conversations on chess with a beginner)
- in German, Goldene Schachzeiten (The Golden Times of Chess)

Others:

- Transformatorji (Transformers)
- Problemi prenosa električne energije (Problems of electric energy transmission)
- Pogovori o elektrotehniki (Talking about electrotechnics)
- Med Evropo in Ameriko (Between Europe and America)
- augmented edition in German, Das Ende des Goldzeitalters (Berlin, 1942)
- Moj pogled na svet (My view of the World)
- Oslovski most (Pons asinorum) (Merkur, Ljubljana 1936)

== Family ==
His younger brother, Josip Vidmar, was an influential Slovenian literary critic and public intellectual; his son, Milan Vidmar Jr. was an International Master of chess.

== Tributes ==
The Slovene Chess Federation organizes an international grandmaster tournament named the Milan Vidmar memorial.
