= Oldřich Duras =

Czech chess grandmaster (1882–1957)

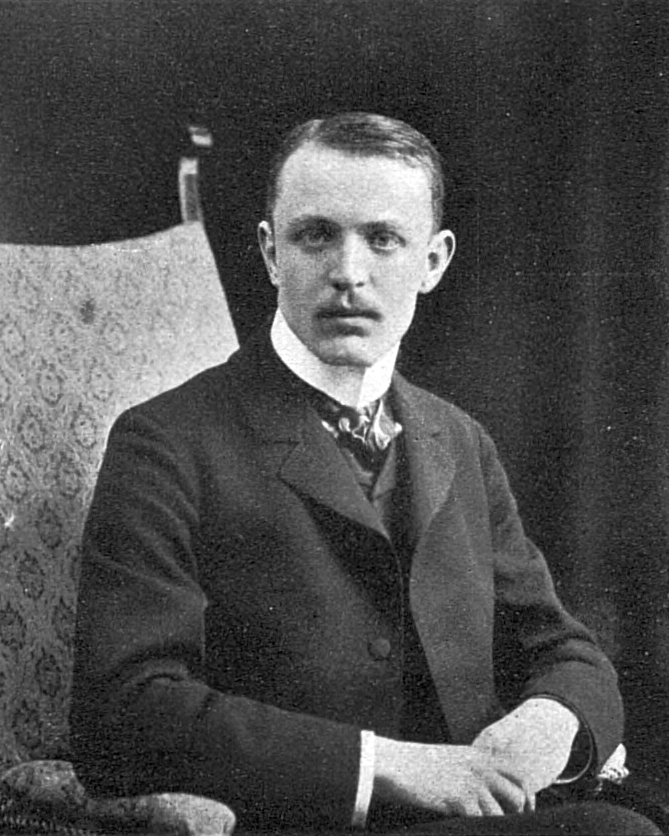
- Duras in 1907

Personal information
- Born: 30 October 1882 Pchery, Bohemia, Austria-Hungary
- Died: 5 January 1957 (aged 74) Prague, Czechoslovakia

Chess career
- Country: Austria-Hungary
- Title: Grandmaster (1950)

Oldřich Duras (born Důras; 30 October 1882 – 5 January 1957) was a Czech chess master. He was among the leading chess masters of the early 20th century. According to Chessmetrics, his highest world ranking was 4th in 1909.

== Biography ==
Young Oldřich Duras

Duras was born on 30 October 1882 in Pchery, Bohemia. He came from a family where everyone played chess. In 1899, he entered the chess club Český spolek šachovní v Praze ("Czech Chess Association in Prague"). After World War I, he got married, which is considered a possible reason for the early end of his active career. He died on 5 January 1957 in Prague, Czechoslovakia.

== Career ==
Duras was among the leading chess masters of the early 20th century, even though his career was short. Among his noted tournament wins (all shared) are Bremen (1905), Prague (1908), Vienna (1908) and Breslau (1912). He had plus scores against Richard Teichmann (+6-2=6), David Janowski (+3-1=0), Carl Schlechter (+2-1=11) and Aron Nimzowitsch (+3-2=3), and level scores with Siegbert Tarrasch and Géza Maróczy. He lost the one game he played with Emanuel Lasker, had a draw and a loss against José Raúl Capablanca, and heavy minus scores against Akiba Rubinstein, Ossip Bernstein and Milan Vidmar and was one game behind with Frank Marshall (+7-8=5).

While still a young man and playing at a near-peak level, Duras suddenly retired from active play after 1914. His career was interrupted by World War I and he did not return to active play after the war ended. However, he continued as a chess writer and chess referee. He also became a noted chess composer.

== Honours ==
The Duras Gambit is named after him.

FIDE awarded him the title of International Grandmaster in 1950, when the title was first introduced, in recognition of his achievements.

In the poll for the best Czechoslovak player of the century, Oldřich Duras came in fourth place (after Richard Réti, Vlastimil Hort and Salo Flohr).

The chess club ŠK Duras Brno in Brno is named after him. In Slaný near his birthplace is Durasova Street, named after him.
