= Rudolf Spielmann =

Austrian chess player (1883–1942)

Personal information
- Born: Rudolf Spielmann; 5 May 1883 Vienna, Austria-Hungary
- Died: 20 August 1942 (aged 59) (remains discovered) Stockholm, Sweden

Chess career
- Country: Austro-Hungarian Empire → Austria

Rudolf Spielmann (5 May 1883 – 20 August 1942) was an Austrian chess master of the romantic school, and chess writer.

== Career ==
Spielmann was born in 1883, second child of Moritz and Cecilia Spielmann, and had a younger brother Edgar, an older brother, Leopold, and three sisters, Melanie, Jenny, and Irma. He was of Jewish-Austrian descent. Moritz Spielmann was a newspaper editor in Vienna, and enjoyed playing chess in his spare time. He introduced Leopold and Rudolf to the game, and the latter quickly began to develop an aptitude for it. Spielmann was devoted to his nieces and nephews, although he never married or had children of his own. American Grandmaster Reuben Fine said in his 1945 book Chess Marches On (p.173), "In appearance and personal habits Spielmann was the mildest-mannered individual alive. Beer and chess were the great passions of his life; in his later years, at least, he cared for little else. Perhaps his chess became so vigorous as compensation for an otherwise uneventful life."

He was known as "The Master of Attack" and "The Last Knight of the King's Gambit". His daredevil play was full of sacrifices, brilliancies, and beautiful ideas. This was exemplified, for example, in the 1923 Carlsbad tournament, where he did not have a single draw (with five wins and twelve losses).

Spielmann was inordinately fond of the King's Gambit as well as the Vienna Game and continued using these openings after most elite players had abandoned them; he was also the last master to make any serious use of the Center Game. By the late 1920s, his opening repertoire increasingly focused on 1.d4 openings as contemporary chess fashion dictated.

Despite the strong opposition at that time, with players like Alexander Alekhine, José Raúl Capablanca, Emanuel Lasker, Siegbert Tarrasch, Akiba Rubinstein, Aron Nimzowitsch, and Savielly Tartakower, Spielmann managed to score well in numerous tournaments. He won 33 of the roughly 120 in which he played, including Abbazia 1912 (an event devoted to the King's Gambit), Stockholm 1919; Pistyan 1922; and Semmering 1926. He is also remembered as the author of the classic book The Art of Sacrifice in Chess .

Like many of his contemporaries, including Lasker, Tarrasch, Rubinstein, and Alekhine, Spielmann suffered greatly thanks to the turmoil that afflicted Europe starting in 1914. His post-WWI tournament performances were more inconsistent than in the prewar period; although he continued to win brilliant victories, he also lost many games in disastrous fashion. In 1934, Spielmann fled Vienna due to rising pro-Nazi sympathies in the city and moved to the Netherlands. In 1938, he went to Prague to be with his brother Leopold, but the German army occupied Czechoslovakia only a few months later. Leopold Spielmann was arrested, deported to the Flossenbürg concentration camp and died in the Theresienstadt Ghetto a few years later (though Leopold's daughters Lilly and Ilse fled successfully to England in 1939). One of their sisters, Irma, also perished in a camp; the other, Jenny, survived the war, but never recovered mentally from the ordeal and killed herself in 1964.

Spielmann managed to flee to Sweden with the help of a friend. He hoped to eventually reach England or the United States, and toiled hard to earn money for the overseas passage by playing exhibition matches, writing chess columns, and a book titled "Memories of a Chess Master". However, WWII was raging and some members of the Swedish Chess Federation held Nazi sympathies and disliked the Jewish Spielmann. "Memories of a Chess Master" was repeatedly delayed and never reached the press. Spielmann became steadily more withdrawn and depressed, and one day in August 1942, he locked himself in his Stockholm apartment and did not emerge for a week. On August 20, neighbors summoned police to check on him. They entered the apartment and found Spielmann dead. The official cause of death was ischemic heart disease, but it has been claimed that he intentionally starved himself. He was buried in Stockholm, his tombstone reading "Rastlös flykting, hårt slagen av ödet" ("A fugitive without rest, struck hard by fate").

== Legacy ==
Some chess openings are named after Spielmann, such as the Spielmann-Indian, beginning 1.d4 Nf6 2.Nf3 c5. It has many similarities to the Benoni Defence, but allows White to play Nc3 in front of the c-pawn, rather than committing c4 as in standard Benonis.

== Results versus Capablanca ==
Spielmann was one of only a few players to have an even score (+2−2=8) against Capablanca, one of an even smaller number to achieve more than one win against him, and the only player to fulfill both of those. Both of Spielmann's wins came shortly after Alekhine dethroned Capablanca as World Champion in 1927: at Bad Kissingen 1928 and Karlsbad 1929. The latter tournament is generally regarded as his best tournament result, as he scored 14½ out of 21, tied for second with Capablanca, a half point behind Aron Nimzowitsch. Here is one of Spielmann's wins:

Capablanca vs. Spielmann, Bad Kissingen 1928

Position: g1 white king, a1 white queen, g2 white pawn, f2 white pawn, h3 white pawn, e3 white pawn, d3 white knight, b3 white pawn, b4 black pawn, a4 white pawn, e5 white knight, d5 black pawn, g6 black pawn, f6 black bishop, d6 black queen, a6 black bishop, h7 black pawn, f7 black pawn, a7 black pawn, g8 black king

Position after 29...Ba6

Capablanca vs. Spielmann, Bad Kissingen 1928
1.d4 d5 2.c4 c6 3.Nc3 Nf6 4.Nf3 dxc4 5.e3 b5 6.a4 b4 7.Na2 e6 8.Bxc4 Be7 9.0-0 0-0 10.b3 c5 11.Bb2 Bb7 12.Nc1 Nc6 13.dxc5 Na5 14.Ne5 Nxc4 15.Nxc4 Bxc5 16.Nd3 Qd5 17.Nf4 Qg5 18.Bxf6 Qxf6 19.Rc1 Rfd8 20.Qh5 Rac8 21.Rfd1 g6 22.Rxd8+ Qxd8 23.Qe5 Be7 24.h3 Rc5 25.Qa1 Bf6 26.Rd1 Rd5 27.Rxd5 exd5 28.Ne5 Qd6 29.Nfd3 Ba6 (diagram) 30.Qe1 Bxe5 31.Nxe5 Qxe5 32.Qxb4 Bd3 33.Qc5 Qb8 34.b4 Qb7 35.b5 h5 36.Qc3 Bc4 37.e4 Qe7 38.exd5 Bxd5 39.a5 Qe4 0–1

== Quotes ==
- According to Richard Réti, Spielmann demonstrated "unusual resourcefulness in complicated situations, in which he felt perfectly at home."
- Spielmann himself believed "A good sacrifice is one that is not necessarily sound but leaves your opponent dazed and confused."
- "We cannot resist the fascination of sacrifice, since a passion for sacrifices is part of a chess player’s nature."
- "Play the opening like a book, the middle game like a magician, and the endgame like a machine."

== See also ==
- List of Jewish chess players
