= Akiba Rubinstein =

Polish chess grandmaster (1880–1961)

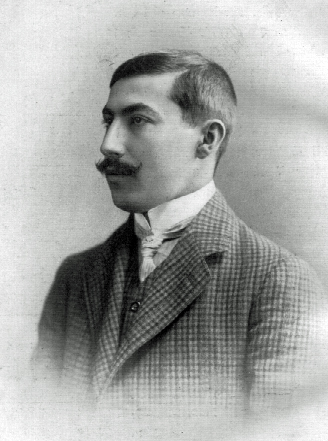
- Rubinstein c. 1907/1908

Personal information
- Born: Akiba Kiwelowicz Rubinstein; 1 December 1880 Stawiski, Congress Poland, Russian Empire
- Died: 14 March 1961 (aged 80) Antwerp, Belgium

Chess career
- Country: Russian Empire (until 1917); Poland (1918–1926; 1930–1932); Belgium (1926–1930)
- Title: Grandmaster (1950)

Akiba Kiwelowicz Rubinstein (1 December 1880 – 14 March 1961) was a Polish chess player. He is considered to have been one of the greatest players never to have become World Chess Champion.

In his youth, he defeated top players José Raúl Capablanca and Carl Schlechter. He was scheduled to play a match with Emanuel Lasker for the World Chess Championship in 1914, but it was cancelled due to the outbreak of World War I. He was unable to re-create consistently the same form after the war, and his later life was plagued by mental illness. He was awarded the title of Grandmaster when FIDE introduced the title in 1950.

== Biography ==
=== Early life ===
Akiba Kiwelowicz Rubinstein was born in Stawiski, Congress Poland, Russian Empire (now Poland), to a Jewish family. He was the youngest of 12 children, (Note: According to Donaldson and Mirev, he was the youngest of 12.) but only one sister survived to adulthood. Rubinstein learned to play chess at the relatively late age of 14, and his family had planned for him to become a rabbi. He trained with and played against the strong master Gersz Salwe in Łódź and in 1903, after finishing fifth in a tournament in Kyiv, Rubinstein decided to abandon his rabbinical studies and devote himself entirely to chess.

=== Chess career ===
Between 1907 and 1912, Rubinstein established himself as one of the strongest players in the world. In 1907, he won the Carlsbad tournament and the All-Russian Masters' tournament, and shared first at Saint Petersburg. In late 1909 Rubinstein played a match in Berlin against Jacques Mieses. Mieses won the first three games, Rubinstein's only defeats that year, before Rubinstein recovered to win the match +5 −3 =2. In 1912 he had a record string of wins, finishing first in five consecutive major tournaments: San Sebastián, Pöstyén, Breslau, Warsaw and Vilna (All-Russian Masters' tournament), although none of these events included Lasker or Capablanca. Some sources believe that he was stronger than World Champion Emanuel Lasker at this time. Ratings from Chessmetrics support this conclusion, placing him as world No. 1 between mid-1912 and mid-1914.

In the pre-FIDE era (before 1948), the reigning world champion handpicked his challenger, and Emanuel Lasker demanded a high sum of money that Rubinstein could not produce. In the St. Petersburg tournament in 1909, he had tied with Lasker and won his individual encounter with him. However, he had a poor showing at the 1914 St. Petersburg tournament, not placing in the top five. A match with Lasker was arranged for October 1914, but it did not take place because of the outbreak of World War I.

Rubinstein's peak as a player is generally considered to have been between 1907 and 1914. During World War I, he was confined to Poland, although he played in a few organized chess events there and traveled to Berlin in early 1918 for a tournament. His playing after the war never regained the same consistency as it had pre-1914. He and his family moved to Sweden following the Armistice in November 1918, where they stayed until 1922, and then moved to Germany. Rubinstein won at Vienna in 1922, ahead of future World Champion Alexander Alekhine, and was the leader of the Polish team that won the 1930 Chess Olympiad at Hamburg with a record of thirteen wins and four draws. He also won an Olympic silver at the 1931 Chess Olympiad, again leading the Polish team.

Rubinstein came in fourth place in the London 1922 tournament, after which the new world champion José Raúl Capablanca offered to play him in a match if he could raise the money, which once again he was unable to do. At Hastings 1922, he came in second place, followed by a fifth-place finish at Teplitz-Schönau late in the year, and then won in Vienna. This triumph, however, was soured when Austrian border guards impounded most of the prize money he had won. Rubinstein closed out 1922 with another appearance at Hastings, which he won, but his tournament record during 1923 was disappointing as he came in just twelfth place at Carlsbad and tenth at Maehrisch-Ostrau.

His first tournament of 1924, at Meran, saw him come in third. He attempted to participate in the New York tournament that spring but was excluded from the event due to a limited number of available slots, all of which were filled. Rubinstein's 1925 tournament record was reasonably good, but his year-end appearance in Moscow saw him come in 14th. His record in 1926 was fair but not outstanding. That year, the Rubinstein family moved to Belgium permanently.

In 1927, Rubinstein visited his birthplace in Poland, where he won the Polish Championship in Łódź. He embarked on an exhibition tour of the United States in early 1928; although a match with reigning US chess champion Frank Marshall was proposed along with an international tournament, it never materialized. He tied third with Max Euwe at Bad Kissingen and then delivered a poor performance in Berlin. Rubinstein had his best post-WWI showing during 1929, when he dominated the Ramsgate tournament in Britain and had excellent showings at Carlsbad and Budapest. He won Rogaška-Slatina.

As the 1930s started, Rubinstein contested the San Remo tournament, coming in fourth. He played well in a few Belgian events that year, and then third place at Scarborough. His performance at Liege was weak, possibly due to exhaustion. He skipped Bled 1931 despite an invitation, played well at Antwerp, but came in dead last at Rotterdam. This was the last major chess event he participated in.

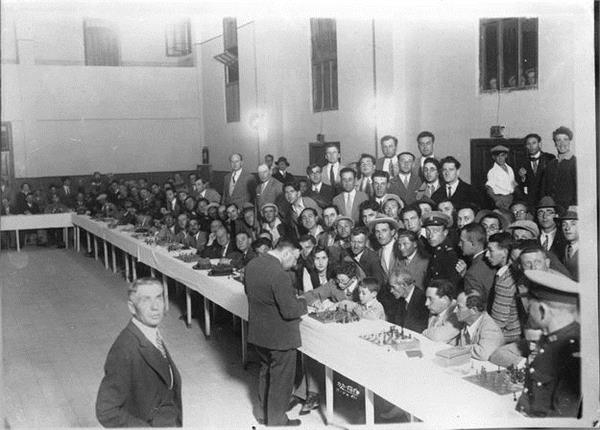
Rubinstein in simultaneous chess exhibition, Tel Aviv, 1931

=== Mental health problems and later life ===
After 1932 he withdrew from tournament play as his noted social anxiety showed traces of schizophrenia during a mental health breakdown. In one period, after making a chess move he would go and hide in the corner of the tournament hall while awaiting his opponent's reply. Regardless, his former strength was recognized by FIDE when he was one of 27 players awarded the inaugural Grandmaster title in 1950.

It is not clear how Rubinstein, who was Jewish, survived World War II in Nazi-occupied Belgium. Chess historian Edward Winter has written on the subject. Citing a number of Rubinstein's peers in the chess world and people who were close to him, it seems that Rubinstein spent the war in a sanatorium. He cites a story about Rubinstein that has, since the war, been published in various books and articles, with varying details: "Nazi investigators once descended on the place and asked Rubinstein, "Are you happy here?" "Not at all", Rubinstein replied. "Would you prefer to go to Germany and work for the Wehrmacht?" "I'd be delighted to", Rubinstein replied. "Then he really must be barmy", the Nazis decided", but Winter quotes Rubinstein's biographers as saying "Most stories concerning Rubinstein are at best half truths, which have become so embellished over time that they bear little resemblance to what actually transpired", before adding "That is indisputable."

Rubinstein was also a well-known coffee drinker, and was known to consume the hot beverage in large quantities before important matches. Unlike many other top grandmasters, he left no literary legacy, which has been attributed to his mental health problems. He spent the last 29 years of his life living at home with his family and in a sanatorium because of his severe mental illness. Rubinstein is a tragic, mentally ill character in the novel The Lüneburg Variation about chess masters, obsession and revenge, by Italian writer Paolo Maurensig. However, while in the mental clinic Rubinstein was visited by Alberic O'Kelly on a number of occasions and he provided the latter with some chess guidance.

== Legacy ==
He was one of the earliest chess players to take the endgame into account when choosing and playing the opening. He was exceptionally talented in the endgame, particularly in rook endings, where he broke new ground in knowledge. Jeremy Silman ranked him as one of the five best endgame players of all time, and a master of rook endgames.

He originated the Rubinstein System against the Tarrasch Defense variation of the Queen's Gambit Declined: 1.d4 d5 2.Nf3 c5 3.c4 e6 4.cxd5 exd5 5.Nc3 Nc6 6.g3 Nf6 7.Bg2 (Rubinstein–Tarrasch, 1912). He is also credited with inventing the Meran Variation, which stems from the Queen's Gambit Declined but reaches a position of the Queen's Gambit Accepted with an extra move for Black.

Many opening variations are named for him. According to Grandmaster Boris Gelfand, "Most of the modern openings are based on Rubinstein." The "Rubinstein Attack" often refers to 1.d4 d5 2.c4 e6 3.Nc3 Nf6 4.Bg5 Be7 5.e3 0-0 6.Nf3 Nbd7 7.Qc2. The Rubinstein Variation of the French Defence arises after 1.e4 e6 2.d4 d5 3.Nc3 (or 3.Nd2) dxe4 4.Nxe4. Apart from 4.Qc2, the Rubinstein Variation of the Nimzo-Indian: 1.d4 Nf6 2.c4 e6 3.Nc3 Bb4 4.e3. There are also the Rubinstein Variation of the Four Knights Game, which arises after 1.e4 e5 2.Nf3 Nc6 3.Nc3 Nf6 4.Bb5 Nd4, and the Rubinstein Variation of the Symmetrical English, 1.c4 c5 2.Nc3 Nf6 3.g3 d5 4.cxd5 Nxd5 5.Bg2 Nc7, a complex system that is very popular at the grandmaster level.

The Rubinstein Trap, an opening trap in the Queen's Gambit Declined that loses at least a pawn for Black, is named for him because he fell into it twice. One version of it runs 1.d4 d5 2.c4 e6 3.Nc3 Nf6 4.cxd5 exd5 5.Bg5 Be7 6.e3 0-0 7.Nf3 Nbd7 8.Bd3 c6 10.0-0 Re8 11.Rc1 h6 12. Bf4 Nh5? 13. Nxd5! Now 13...cxd5?? is met by 14.Bc7, winning the queen, while 13...Nxf4 14.Nxf4 leaves White a pawn ahead.

The Rubinstein Memorial tournament in his honour has been held annually since 1963 in Polanica-Zdrój, with a list of top-flight winners. Boris Gelfand has named Rubinstein as his favourite player, and once said, "what I like in chess ... comes from Akiba."

== Notable games ==
Mattison vs. Rubinstein, 1929

Position: c1 white king, h2 white pawn, g2 white pawn, c2 white pawn, b2 white pawn, a2 white pawn, f3 white pawn, e4 white pawn, d5 white rook, c5 black pawn, f6 black pawn, d6 black pawn, a6 black pawn, h7 black pawn, g7 black pawn, b7 black pawn, d8 black rook, c8 black king

Position after 20.Rxd5
- Hermanis Mattison vs. Akiba Rubinstein, Carlsbad 1929, (C68), 0–1 This game contains a rook and pawn ending that seemed "hopelessly drawn" but was won by Rubinstein. The editor of the tournament book said that if this game had been played 300 years earlier, Rubinstein would have been burned at the stake for dealing with evil spirits.
- George Rotlewi vs. Akiba Rubinstein, Lodz 1907, Tarrasch Defense: Symmetrical Variation (D02), 0–1 This game contains an attacking combination that was called "perhaps the most magnificent ... of all time" by Carl Schlechter.
- Akiba Rubinstein vs. Emanuel Lasker, St.Petersburg 1909, Queen's Gambit Declined: Orthodox Variation (D30), 1–0 This game ends in a position where Lasker has no good moves (zugzwang).
Rubinstein vs. Vidmar 1908

Position: g8 black king, a7 black pawn, b7 black pawn, c7 black pawn, g7 black pawn, h7 black pawn, d6 black pawn, g6 black bishop, a5 black queen, h5 white king, c4 white pawn, d4 white pawn, e4 black knight, f4 white pawn, a2 white pawn, b2 white queen, f2 white pawn, g2 white pawn, h2 white pawn, c1 white rook, h1 white rook

Position after 24...Bg6+
- Akiba Rubinstein vs. Karel Hromádka, Moravská Ostrava 1923, King's Gambit Declined: Classical Variation (C30), 1–0 A game full of tactics and hanging pieces in which Rubinstein beat former Czech champion Karel Hromádka.
- Akiba Rubinstein vs. Carl Schlechter, San Sebastian 1912, 1–0 Capablanca called this game "a monument of magnificent precision".
- Akiba Rubinstein vs. Milan Vidmar Sr., Berlin 1918, 0–1 This game was the sensation of the tournament, in that Vidmar defeated Rubinstein, the winner of six previous tournaments. Vidmar employed the then novel Budapest Gambit. The game featured a spectacular King hunt, with the White King fleeing from e1 to h5. White resigned on move 24, one move shy of checkmate.

== Personal life ==
In 1917, Rubinstein married Eugénie Lew. They had two sons, Jonas in 1918 and Sammy in 1927. For a time, they lived above the restaurant that Eugénie operated. After she died in 1954, Rubinstein lived in an old-people's home until his death in 1961 at the age of 80. He reportedly still followed chess in his final years; his sons recalled going over the games of the 1954 Botvinnik–Smyslov world championship match with him.
