= World Chess Championship 1934 =

1934 chess match between Alexander Alekhine and Efim Bogoljubow

	Defending champion	Challenger
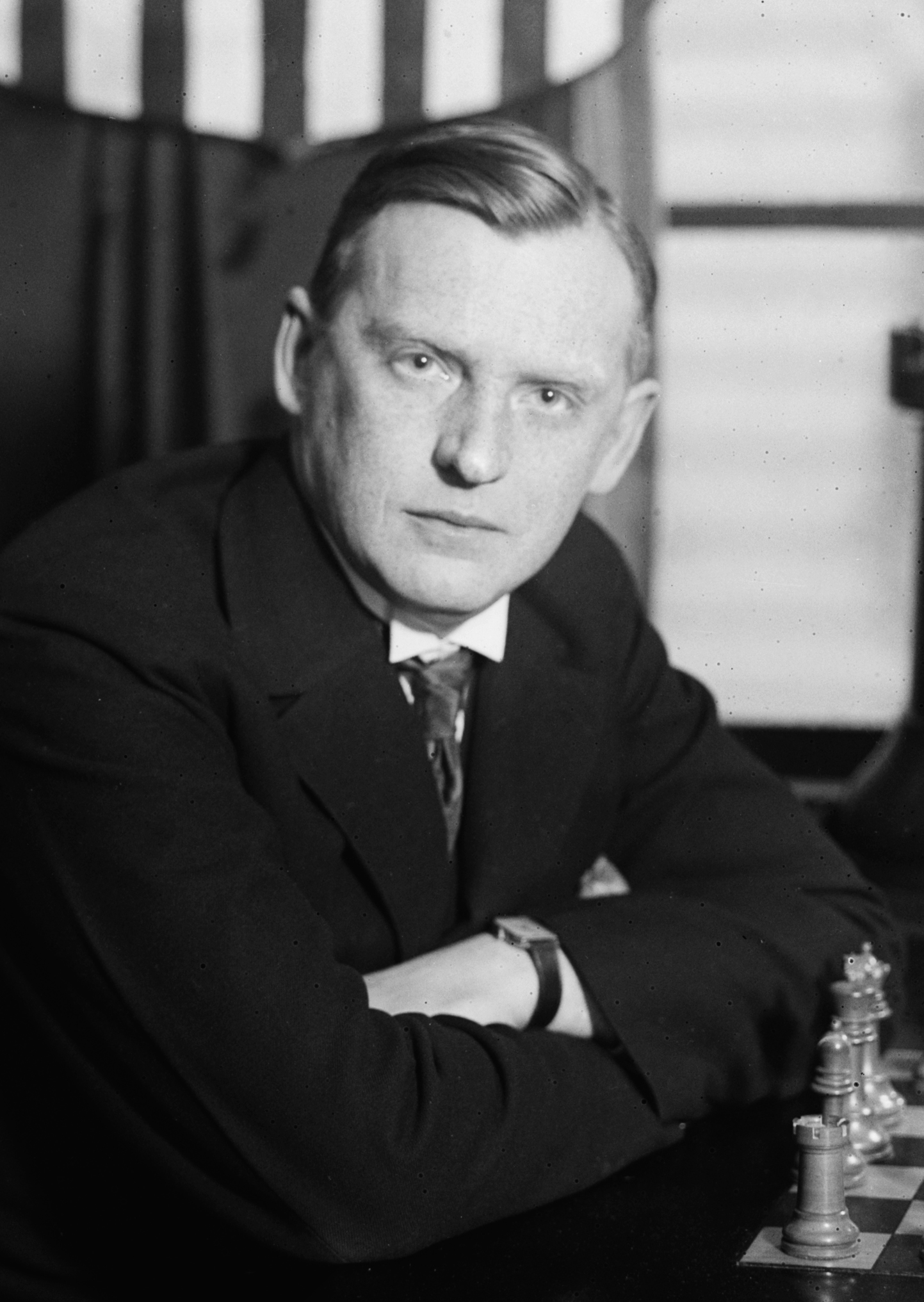
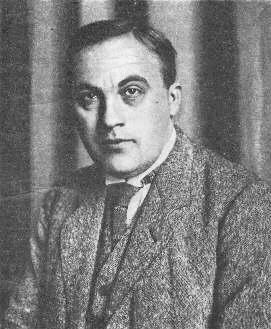
	Alexander Alekhine	Efim Bogoljubow
	(French Third Republic) Alexander Alekhine	(Nazi Germany) Efim Bogoljubov
15½	Scores	10½
	Born 31 October 1892; 42 years old	Born 26 April 1889; 44/45 years old

In 1934, a World Chess Championship was played between challenger Efim Bogoljubow and titleholder Alexander Alekhine. The match was held in various cities and towns in Germany from April 1 to June 14, with Alekhine retaining his title.

== Background ==
Alekhine had been world champion since 1927. His only previous title defence had been in 1929, also against Bogoljubow, and Alekhine won that match convincingly 15½−9½.

Due to the number of alternative challengers to Bogoljubow that were perceived as more worthy challengers at the time, many saw this world championship match as pointless, including Alekhine himself, who said:

This game – more than any other – proves how useless from the sporting point of view was the arrangement of this second match, and at the same time explains my indifferent play on a number of occasions.

— Alexander Alekhine, My Best Games · 1924–1937

== Results ==
The first player to win six games and score more than 15 points would be Champion.

World Chess Championship Match 1934
	1	2	3	4	5	6	7	8	9	10	11	12	13	14	15	16	17	18	19	20	21	22	23	24	25	26	Wins	Points
Efim Bogoljubov (Germany)	½	0	½	0	½	½	½	½	0	1	0	½	½	½	½	0	0	½	½	½	0	½	1	1	0	½	3	10½
Alexander Alekhine (France)	½	1	½	1	½	½	½	½	1	0	1	½	½	½	½	1	1	½	½	½	1	½	0	0	1	½	8	15½

Alekhine retained the Championship.

== Games ==
=== Game 1: Bogoljubov–Alekhine, ½–½ ===
Queen's Gambit Declined, Semi-Tarrasch (ECO D40)
1.d4 d5 2.c4 e6 3.Nf3 Nf6 4.Nc3 c5 5.Bg5 cxd4 6.Nxd4 dxc4 7.e3 Qb6 8.Bxf6 gxf6 9.Bxc4 Bd7 10.0-0 Nc6 11.Bb3 Be7 12.Rc1 Rd8 13.Nxc6 Bxc6 14.Qh5 Qc5 15.Nd5 Qd6 16.Nxe7 Kxe7 17.Qa5 Rhg8 18.g3 Qb8 19.Ba4 Rg5 20.Qc3 Bxa4 21.Qb4+ Qd6 22.Qxa4 Qb6 23.Rc3 Rb5 24.Rfc1 Rd7 25.Qa3+ Qd6 26.Qxa7 Rxb2 27.Rc8 Rd2 28.e4 Rd1+ 29.Rxd1 Qxd1+ 30.Kg2 Qd3 31.Qc5+ Qd6 32.Qc3 b5 33.Rc6 Qd4 34.Qc2 b4 35.Rc4 Qb6 36.Qb2 Rb7 37.e5 fxe5 38.Qxe5 Qd6 39.Qg5+ Kd7 40.Rf4 f5 41.Kh3 Kc6 42.Qg8 Kb5 43.Qe8+ Qd7 44.Qf8 Qe7 45.Qa8 Ra7 46.Qb8+ Rb7 47.Qe5+ Ka6 48.Rc4 Rb5 49.Rc6+ Ka5 50.Qxe6 Qxe6 51.Rxe6 Rd5 52.Re2 Rd6 53.f4 Rh6+ 54.Kg2 Kb5 55.h3 Rg6 56.Kf3 h5 57.Re5+ Kc4 58.Rxf5 Ra6 59.Rxh5 Rxa2 60.Rh8 b3 61.Rc8+ Kd4 62.Rd8+ Kc3 63.Rc8+ Kd3 64.Rd8+ Kc3 65.Rc8+ Kd3 ½–½

=== Game 2: Alekhine–Bogoljubov, 1–0 ===
Queen's Gambit Declined Semi-Slav, Meran (ECO D48)
1.d4 Nf6 2.c4 c6 3.Nf3 d5 4.e3 e6 5.Bd3 Nbd7 6.Nc3 dxc4 7.Bxc4 b5 8.Bd3 a6 9.0-0 c5 10.a4 b4 11.Ne4 Bb7 12.Ned2 Be7 13.a5 0-0 14.Nc4 Qc7 15.Qe2 Ng4 16.e4 cxd4 17.h3 Nge5 18.Nfxe5 Nxe5 19.Bf4 Bd6 20.Bxe5 Bxe5 21.Nb6 Ra7 22.Rac1 Qd6 23.Rc4 f5 24.exf5 exf5 25.Re1 Qg6 26.f3 Re8 27.f4 Qg3 28.fxe5 Rxe5 29.Rc8+ Kf7 30.Qh5+ g6 31.Qxh7+ Kf6 32.Rf8+ Kg5 33.h4+ Kf4 34.Qh6+ g5 35.Rxf5+ Rxf5 36.Qd6+ Kg4 37.Bxf5+ 1–0

=== Game 3: Bogoljubov–Alekhine, ½–½ ===
Queen's Gambit Accepted (ECO D22)
1.d4 d5 2.c4 dxc4 3.Nf3 a6 4.e3 Bg4 5.Bxc4 e6 6.h3 Bh5 7.Nc3 Nf6 8.0-0 Nc6 9.a3 Bd6 10.Be2 0-0 11.Nd2 Bxe2 12.Qxe2 e5 13.dxe5 Bxe5 14.Rb1 Re8 15.Nf3 Qe7 16.Nxe5 Qxe5 17.Qc2 Rad8 18.Bd2 Qe6 19.Rbd1 Qc4 20.Bc1 Ne5 21.e4 h6 22.Be3 Rd3 23.Rxd3 Qxd3 24.Qa4 Qc4 25.Qc2 Qd3 26.Qa4 Qc4 27.Qc2 Qd3 ½–½

=== Game 4: Alekhine–Bogoljubov, 1–0 ===
Queen's Gambit Declined Slav (ECO D10)
1.d4 d5 2.c4 c6 3.Nc3 Nf6 4.e3 e6 5.Bd3 Nbd7 6.f4 dxc4 7.Bxc4 b5 8.Bd3 Bb7 9.Nf3 a6 10.a4 b4 11.Ne2 c5 12.0-0 Be7 13.a5 0-0 14.Ng3 g6 15.Qe2 cxd4 16.exd4 Nb8 17.Ne5 Nc6 18.Nxc6 Bxc6 19.Bc4 Bb7 20.Be3 Qd6 21.Rad1 Rfe8 22.b3 Bf8 23.Rd3 Qc7 24.Qa2 Bd6 25.Bd2 Qc6 26.Be1 Rad8 27.Rd2 Be7 28.Qb2 Rd7 29.Rc2 Qd6 30.Ne2 Nd5 31.Qc1 Bd8 32.Bg3 Qe7 33.Ra2 Qf6 34.Qd2 Qf5 35.Bd3 Qf6 36.Bc4 Be7 37.Qd3 Red8 38.Be1 Qf5 39.Qd2 Qe4 40.Bd3 Qe3+ 41.Bf2 Qxd2 42.Rxd2 Rc8 43.Bc4 Kg7 44.g3 Rcd8 45.Rc1 h6 46.Bd3 f5 47.Rdc2 g5 48.g4 Nxf4 49.Nxf4 gxf4 50.gxf5 e5 51.Re1 exd4 52.Rxe7+ Rxe7 53.Bh4 Kf7 54.Bxe7 Kxe7 55.Rc7+ Rd7 56.f6+ Ke8 57.Bg6+ Kd8 58.f7 Kxc7 59.f8=Q f3 60.Qxb4 Rd6 61.Bd3 1–0

=== Game 5: Bogoljubov–Alekhine, ½–½ ===
Queen's Gambit Accepted (ECO D26)
1.d4 d5 2.c4 dxc4 3.Nf3 Nf6 4.e3 c5 5.Bxc4 e6 6.0-0 Nc6 7.Nc3 Be7 8.dxc5 Qxd1 9.Rxd1 Bxc5 10.a3 Ke7 11.b4 Bb6 12.Bb2 Rd8 13.Rxd8 Bxd8 14.e4 Bd7 15.Bd3 h6 16.e5 Ne8 17.Rd1 Bb6 18.Ne4 a6 19.Bc3 Nc7 20.Nd6 Nd5 21.Bb2 Nd8 22.Be4 Bc6 23.Nd4 Bc7 24.Rc1 Kd7 25.Nxc6 bxc6 26.Nc4 a5 27.b5 Rb8 28.bxc6+ Nxc6 29.g3 Rb5 30.Rd1 Rc5 31.Bd3 Ke7 32.f4 Nb6 33.Nd6 Na4 34.Ba1 Nc3 35.Rf1 Bxd6 36.exd6+ Kxd6 37.f5 exf5 38.Bxf5 Nd4 39.Bd3 f5 40.Kg2 g6 41.g4 fxg4 42.Bxg6 Nf3 43.Bd3 h5 44.Rc1 Nh4+ 45.Kh1 Ne4 46.Rxc5 Nf2+ 47.Kg1 Nh3+ 48.Kf1 Kxc5 49.Ba6 Nf3 50.Kg2 h4 51.Bf6 ½–½

=== Game 6: Alekhine–Bogoljubov, ½–½ ===
Queen's Gambit Declined Slav (ECO D11)
1.d4 d5 2.c4 c6 3.Nf3 Nf6 4.e3 e6 5.Bd3 Nbd7 6.Nbd2 Be7 7.0-0 0-0 8.b3 b6 9.Bb2 Bb7 10.Qe2 a5 11.a4 Bb4 12.e4 dxe4 13.Nxe4 Nxe4 14.Bxe4 Qe7 15.Rad1 Rfd8 16.Bc2 Rac8 17.Rd3 Nf8 18.Ne5 c5 19.dxc5 Bxc5 20.Rg3 f6 21.Ng4 Kh8 22.Nxf6 gxf6 23.Qg4 Nd7 24.Bxh7 Qxh7 25.Rh3 Rg8 26.Rxh7+ Kxh7 27.Qh4+ Kg6 28.Rd1 Rcd8 29.Rd3 Rh8 30.Qg3+ Kf7 31.Qc7 Bc8 32.Bd4 Be7 33.f4 Rhe8 34.Be3 f5 35.h3 Nc5 36.Rxd8 Rxd8 37.Qxb6 Ne4 38.g4 Rd3 39.Kg2 Bd7 40.g5 Rd6 41.Qxa5 Be8 42.h4 Rd3 43.Qb6 Rd6 44.Qc7 Kf8 45.Qc8 Rd3 46.Bb6 Rxb3 47.a5 Rb2+ 48.Kf3 Nd6 49.Qa8 Nxc4 50.g6 Rb3+ 51.Ke2 Rb2+ 52.Kd3 Nxb6 53.axb6 Rxb6 54.g7+ Kxg7 55.Qxe8 Bxh4 56.Qd7+ Kg6 57.Kc4 Bf6 58.Kc5 Rb8 59.Qxe6 Rd8 60.Kc6 Rh8 ½–½

=== Game 7: Bogoljubov–Alekhine, ½–½ ===
Queen's Gambit Accepted, Classical (ECO D28)
1.d4 d5 2.c4 dxc4 3.Nf3 Nf6 4.e3 c5 5.Bxc4 e6 6.0-0 a6 7.Qe2 Nc6 8.Rd1 b5 9.Bb3 c4 10.Bc2 Nb4 11.a3 Nxc2 12.Qxc2 Bb7 13.Nc3 Nd5 14.Ne2 Nf6 15.Nc3 Nd5 16.Ne2 Nf6 17.Nc3 Nd5 ½–½

=== Game 8: Alekhine–Bogoljubov, ½–½ ===
Nimzo-Indian, Samisch (ECO E24)
1.d4 Nf6 2.c4 e6 3.Nc3 Bb4 4.a3 Bxc3+ 5.bxc3 c5 6.Nf3 0-0 7.Bg5 d6 8.Qc2 Re8 9.e4 h6 10.Be3 Qa5 11.Bd2 e5 12.Bd3 Nc6 13.0-0 Qc7 14.d5 Ne7 15.Nh4 g5 16.Nf5 Nxf5 17.exf5 e4 18.Be2 Bxf5 19.h4 Nh7 20.g4 e3 21.Qxf5 Re5 22.Qd3 exd2 23.Qxd2 Rae8 24.Bd3 Qe7 25.Bf5 Re2 26.Qd3 Nf8 27.h5 Qe5 28.Rab1 b6 29.Qf3 Qf6 30.a4 Kg7 31.Qd3 R8e7 32.Ra1 Qe5 33.a5 Nd7 34.Qf3 Qf6 35.axb6 Nxb6 36.Rxa7 Nxc4 37.Rxe7 Rxe7 38.Rd1 Ra7 39.Rc1 Qe5 40.Bd3 Nd2 41.Qf5 Qxf5 42.Bxf5 Nf3+ 43.Kg2 Nh4+ 44.Kg3 Nxf5+ 45.gxf5 Kf6 46.Re1 Ra4 47.Re8 Rc4 48.Rh8 Rxc3+ 49.Kg2 Kxf5 50.Rxh6 f6 51.Rh7 Ke5 52.h6 Ra3 53.Re7+ Kxd5 54.h7 Ra8 55.Kg3 f5 56.f4 gxf4+ 57.Kxf4 c4 58.Kxf5 c3 59.Rd7 Rc8 60.Rc7 Rf8+ 61.Kg6 Kd4 62.Kg7 Rb8 63.h8=Q Rxh8 64.Kxh8 d5 65.Kg7 Kd3 66.Kf6 ½–½

=== Game 9: Bogoljubov–Alekhine, 0–1 ===
Old Benoni Defense (ECO A44)
1.d4 c5 2.d5 e5 3.e4 d6 4.f4 exf4 5.Bxf4 Qh4+ 6.g3 Qe7 7.Nc3 g5 8.Be3 Nd7 9.Nf3 h6 10.Qd2 Ngf6 11.0-0-0 Ng4 12.Be2 Bg7 13.Rhf1 Nxe3 14.Qxe3 a6 15.Ng1 b5 16.Rde1 Bb7 17.Nd1 0-0-0 18.Bg4 Kb8 19.Bxd7 Rxd7 20.Qd2 g4 21.Ne3 Qe5 22.c3 h5 23.Nf5 Bf6 24.Qf4 Qxf4+ 25.gxf4 Rdd8 26.c4 bxc4 27.Ne3 c3 28.b3 Bd4 29.Nc4 f5 30.e5 dxe5 31.fxe5 Bxd5 32.Rxf5 Rdf8 33.Rxf8+ Rxf8 34.e6 Re8 35.e7 Bxc4 36.bxc4 Bxg1 37.Rxg1 Rxe7 38.h3 gxh3 39.Kc2 h2 40.Rb1+ Rb7 41.Rh1 Rb2+ 42.Kxc3 Rxa2 43.Kd3 Kc7 44.Ke4 Kc6 45.Kf5 a5 46.Kg5 Re2 0–1

=== Game 10: Alekhine–Bogoljubov, 0–1 ===
Queen's Gambit Declined (ECO D52)
1.d4 Nf6 2.c4 e6 3.Nf3 d5 4.Nc3 c6 5.Bg5 Nbd7 6.e3 Qa5 7.Nd2 Bb4 8.Qc2 dxc4 9.Bxf6 Nxf6 10.Nxc4 Bxc3+ 11.Qxc3 Qxc3+ 12.bxc3 Ke7 13.f3 Bd7 14.Rb1 b6 15.Ne5 Rhc8 16.Ba6 Rc7 17.Kd2 c5 18.Rhc1 Rd8 19.g4 Ba4 20.h4 Nd7 21.Nxd7 Rcxd7 22.f4 h6 23.Ke2 Bc6 24.Bb5 Rd6 25.Bxc6 Rxc6 26.Kd3 f6 27.a4 e5 28.a5 Rcd6 29.axb6 axb6 30.f5 R8d7 31.Ra1 b5 32.Ra5 cxd4 33.cxd4 exd4 34.e4 Rb6 35.Rb1 b4 36.g5 b3 37.e5 fxe5 38.Rxe5+ Kf7 39.Rb2 Rb4 40.Re4 Rd5 41.Rf4 hxg5 42.hxg5 Rbb5 43.f6 g6 44.Rf3 Rxg5 45.Kxd4 Rg4+ 46.Kc3 Rgb4 47.Rf1 g5 48.Rbf2 b2 49.Rb1 Rb8 50.Kd3 R4b6 51.Ke3 Rb3+ 52.Kd2 R8b7 53.Kc2 R7b6 54.Kd1 R3b4 55.Ke1 R4b5 56.Kd1 g4 57.Kc2 Rb3 58.Rh2 Kxf6 59.Rh8 Kg7 60.Rh4 Rg3 61.Rh2 Rgb3 62.Rh4 R3b4 63.Kc3 Kg6 64.Rhh1 Kg5 65.Kd2 R4b5 66.Ke2 Rh6 67.Rhg1 Rh2+ 68.Kd3 Kh4 69.Rge1 Rd5+ 70.Kc3 Rc5+ 71.Kb3 Rc1 72.Rbxc1 bxc1=Q 73.Rxc1 g3 74.Rc8 g2 75.Rc4+ Kg3 76.Rc3+ Kf2 77.Rc2+ Ke1 78.Rc1+ Kd2 79.Rc2+ Kd1 80.Ra2 Rh3+ 81.Kc4 Rg3 0–1

=== Game 11: Bogoljubov–Alekhine, 0–1 ===
Dutch (ECO A92)
1.d4 f5 2.g3 Nf6 3.Bg2 e6 4.Nf3 Be7 5.c4 0-0 6.Nc3 d6 7.Bf4 Qe8 8.Rc1 Nc6 9.d5 Nd8 10.Nb5 Qd7 11.Qb3 a6 12.dxe6 Nxe6 13.Nc3 Nxf4 14.gxf4 Kh8 15.Nd5 Bd8 16.e3 Ne4 17.Nd4 c5 18.Ne2 Ba5+ 19.Ndc3 b5 20.0-0 Bb7 21.Nxe4 Bxe4 22.Rfd1 Bxg2 23.Kxg2 Rab8 24.cxb5 Rxb5 25.Qd5 Rxb2 26.Ng3 Bb6 27.a3 c4 28.Kg1 Qe8 29.Rxc4 Bc5 30.a4 Qg6 31.Rc3 h5 32.h4 Qf6 33.Rcd3 g6 34.Qc4 a5 35.Qc3 Qxc3 36.Rxc3 Ra2 37.Rc4 Rb8 38.Rd5 Rb1+ 39.Kg2 Rbb2 40.Nh1 Rb4 41.Rcxc5 dxc5 42.Rxc5 Raxa4 43.Rc8+ Kg7 44.Rc7+ Kh6 45.Rc6 Ra2 46.Ng3 Kg7 47.Rc7+ Kf8 48.Rc8+ Kf7 49.Rc7+ Ke8 50.Rc6 Rbb2 51.Nh1 Kf7 52.Rc7+ Kf6 53.Rc6+ Kg7 54.Rc7+ Kh6 55.Rc6 a4 56.Kh3 a3 57.e4 fxe4 58.f5 e3 59.fxg6 exf2 60.Ng3 Rb3 61.Rf6 Kg7 62.Rxf2 Rxg3+ 0–1

=== Game 12: Alekhine–Bogoljubov, ½–½ ===
Queen's Gambit Declined Semi-Slav, Meran (ECO D49)
1.d4 Nf6 2.c4 e6 3.Nf3 c6 4.Nc3 d5 5.e3 Nbd7 6.Bd3 dxc4 7.Bxc4 b5 8.Bd3 a6 9.e4 c5 10.e5 cxd4 11.Nxb5 Nxe5 12.Nxe5 axb5 13.0-0 Qd5 14.Qe2 Ba6 15.Bg5 Be7 16.a4 0-0 17.axb5 Bb7 18.f4 h6 19.Bh4 Rxa1 20.Rxa1 Ra8 21.Rf1 Bc5 22.Nc6 Bxc6 23.bxc6 Qxc6 24.Bxf6 gxf6 25.Qg4+ Kf8 26.Qh5 Bb6 27.Qxh6+ Ke7 28.Qh5 Rb8 29.Qe2 Ba5 30.h4 Qd6 31.h5 Qb4 32.Qc2 f5 33.Rc1 Kf6 34.Qf2 Kg7 35.Rd1 Kh8 36.b3 Rg8 37.Bc4 Qc3 38.Kf1 Bb6 39.Qe1 Qxe1+ 40.Rxe1 Rg4 41.Ra1 Rxf4+ 42.Ke2 Re4+ 43.Kd1 Kg7 44.Ra8 Bc5 45.Rb8 Bd6 46.Rb7 Kf6 47.b4 Rg4 48.b5 Rxg2 49.Rd7 Bc5 50.Rc7 Bb4 51.Rd7 Rd2+ 52.Kc1 Rh2 53.b6 Bd2+ 54.Kb1 Bf4 55.b7 Rxh5 56.Rd8 Rh2 57.b8=Q Bxb8 58.Rxb8 e5 59.Rd8 Rh3 60.Rd7 Rc3 61.Bxf7 d3 62.Kb2 Rc2+ 63.Kb3 e4 64.Bc4 Ke5 65.Rd5+ Kf4 66.Bb5 Rh2 67.Kc3 Rh5 68.Bd7 Rg5 69.Kd2 Rg2+ 70.Kc3 Rg5 71.Kd2 Rh5 72.Kc3 Ke3 73.Bxf5 d2 74.Kc2 Rh6 75.Rxd2 ½–½

=== Game 13: Bogoljubov–Alekhine, ½–½ ===
Queen's Indian (ECO A47)
1.Nf3 Nf6 2.d4 b6 3.Bg5 Ne4 4.Bh4 Bb7 5.e3 h6 6.Nbd2 g5 7.Bg3 Nxg3 8.hxg3 e6 9.c3 d6 10.Qa4+ c6 11.Ne4 g4 12.Nh4 Nd7 13.0-0-0 Rg8 14.c4 d5 15.Nc3 a6 16.Qc2 b5 17.c5 f5 18.Kb1 Qc7 19.Bd3 0-0-0 20.Ne2 Re8 21.Nf4 Kb8 22.Nhg6 Bg7 23.Rh2 Bc8 24.Rh5 Nf8 25.Nxf8 Bxf8 26.Rdh1 Bg7 27.a3 Qf7 28.Ka2 e5 29.dxe5 d4+ 30.Kb1 dxe3 31.e6 Bxe6 32.Nxe6 Qxe6 33.Bxf5 Qf6 34.fxe3 Rxe3 35.Bxg4 Rge8 36.Rd1 R3e4 37.Rf5 Qe7 38.Rf4 Re1 39.Rf1 Rxf1 40.Rxf1 Rd8 41.Bf3 Qe3 42.Qe4 Qxe4+ 43.Bxe4 Rc8 44.Rd1 Kc7 45.Bf3 Be5 46.Re1 Re8 47.Re4 a5 48.b4 a4 49.Kc2 Re7 50.Rh4 Re6 51.Rg4 Ba1 52.Rg8 Bd4 53.Rf8 Re7 54.g4 Kb7 55.Rg8 Bg7 56.Rd8 Be5 57.Rf8 Bd4 58.Rf5 Be3 59.Rf6 Rc7 60.Re6 Bg5 61.Be4 Rc8 62.g3 Rc7 63.Rd6 Rc8 64.Bf5 Rd8 65.Re6 Rd2+ 66.Kb1 Rd1+ 67.Kc2 Rd2+ 68.Kb1 Rd1+ 69.Kb2 Rd2+ 70.Ka1 Rd1+ 71.Ka2 Rd2+ 72.Ka1 Rd1+ 73.Kb2 Rd2+ 74.Kb1 ½–½

=== Game 14: Alekhine–Bogoljubov, ½–½ ===
Queen's Gambit Declined Semi-Slav (ECO D43)
1.d4 Nf6 2.c4 e6 3.Nf3 d5 4.Nc3 c6 5.Bg5 Nbd7 6.Qb3 Be7 7.e3 0-0 8.Be2 Ne4 9.Bxe7 Qxe7 10.Nxe4 dxe4 11.Nd2 e5 12.0-0-0 Nf6 13.h3 Rb8 14.g4 Re8 15.Rhe1 h6 16.Qc3 Bd7 17.Nb3 b6 18.Rg1 exd4 19.Qxd4 c5 20.Qd6 Ba4 21.h4 g5 22.hxg5 hxg5 23.Qh2 Kg7 24.Rh1 Rh8 25.Qg3 Rbe8 26.Rxh8 Rxh8 27.Rg1 Bxb3 28.axb3 Re8 29.Rh1 Qe5 30.Qh3 Kf8 31.Rd1 Ke7 32.Kb1 Rd8 33.Rxd8 Kxd8 34.Qh8+ Ke7 35.Qc8 Nd7 36.Qb7 a5 37.Ka2 Kd8 38.Bd1 Qe6 39.Bc2 Nf6 40.f3 exf3 41.Qxf3 Kc7 42.Bf5 Qc6 43.Qg3+ Qd6 44.Qg2 Ng8 45.Qa8 Ne7 46.e4 Qd8 47.Qa7+ Kd6 48.Qb7 Ke5 49.Bd7 f6 50.Ka3 Kd6 51.Bb5 Ke5 52.Bd7 Kd6 53.Bb5 Ke5 54.Bd7 ½–½

=== Game 15: Bogoljubov–Alekhine, ½–½ ===
Queen's Gambit Accepted (ECO D21)
1.Nf3 e6 2.c4 d5 3.d4 dxc4 4.Nc3 a6 5.e3 b5 6.a4 b4 7.Nb1 Nf6 8.Bxc4 Bb7 9.0-0 c5 10.Nbd2 cxd4 11.exd4 Bd6 12.Re1 0-0 13.Ne5 Nbd7 14.Bb3 Be7 15.Ndc4 Nd5 16.a5 Qc7 17.Qd3 Rad8 18.Qg3 Bf6 19.Bd2 Nb8 20.Rac1 Qe7 21.Ba4 Rc8 22.Qb3 Bg5 23.Ne3 Rxc1 24.Rxc1 Rd8 25.g3 Nxe3 26.fxe3 Bd5 27.Qd3 Qb7 28.Rf1 Be4 29.Qc4 Bd5 30.Qd3 Rf8 31.Nc4 Be4 32.Qe2 Be7 33.Nb6 Nc6 34.Qh5 Bg6 35.Qf3 Nxa5 36.Qxb7 Nxb7 37.Rc1 Rb8 38.Nd7 Rd8 39.Rc7 Be4 40.Nb6 Bd6 41.Rc1 h6 42.Bd1 Bf8 43.Kf2 e5 44.Rc8 Rxc8 45.Nxc8 Na5 46.Nb6 Bd3 47.Nd5 Nc4 48.Nxb4 Be4 49.Bc3 Nxb2 50.Bxb2 Bxb4 51.dxe5 Kf8 52.Bb3 Ke7 53.Ke2 a5 54.Bd4 h5 55.Ba4 g6 56.Bb3 Bf5 57.Bd5 Bc2 58.e4 a4 59.Ke3 g5 60.Ke2 Kf8 61.Ke3 Kg7 62.Ke2 Kg6 63.Ke3 h4 64.Ke2 Bb1 65.Ke3 a3 66.Ke2 Bc2 67.Ke3 Bb1 68.Ke2 a2 69.Kd1 Bc5 70.Bxa2 ½–½

=== Game 16: Alekhine–Bogoljubov, 1–0 ===
Ruy Lopez (ECO C77)
1.e4 e5 2.Nf3 Nc6 3.Bb5 a6 4.Ba4 Nf6 5.Bxc6 dxc6 6.Nc3 Bd6 7.d3 c5 8.h3 Be6 9.Be3 h6 10.a4 c4 11.d4 exd4 12.Bxd4 Bb4 13.0-0 c6 14.e5 Nd5 15.Ne4 Nf4 16.Bc5 Bxc5 17.Qxd8+ Rxd8 18.Nxc5 b6 19.Nb7 Rd7 20.Nd6+ Ke7 21.Nd4 Bd5 22.g3 Nxh3+ 23.Kh2 Ng5 24.f4 Ne4 25.N6f5+ Kd8 26.Nxg7 f6 27.Rad1 Kc8 28.Ndf5 fxe5 29.fxe5 Rg8 30.e6 Rdxg7 31.Nxg7 Rxg7 32.Rxd5 cxd5 33.Rf8+ Kc7 34.Rf7+ Kd6 35.Rxg7 Kxe6 36.Rg6+ Ke5 37.Kg2 b5 38.a5 d4 39.Rxa6 b4 40.Kf3 c3 41.bxc3 bxc3 42.Re6+ Kxe6 43.Kxe4 1–0

=== Game 17: Bogoljubov–Alekhine, 0–1 ===
Queen's Gambit Accepted (ECO D24)
1.d4 d5 2.c4 dxc4 3.Nf3 Nf6 4.Nc3 a6 5.e4 b5 6.e5 Nd5 7.Ng5 e6 8.Qf3 Qd7 9.Nxd5 exd5 10.a3 Nc6 11.Be3 Nd8 12.Be2 Qf5 13.Qg3 h6 14.Nh3 c6 15.f4 Qc2 16.Qf2 Bxa3 17.0-0 Bxb2 18.Rae1 Bf5 19.g4 Be4 20.f5 Nb7 21.Nf4 0-0-0 22.Qg3 g5 23.fxg6 fxg6 24.Bd1 Qc3 25.Ne6 Rde8 26.Rf6 Re7 27.Ref1 Rhe8 28.Nf4 Nd8 29.Qf2 Qa3 30.Bf3 Bxf3 31.Qxf3 g5 32.Ne2 Re6 33.Rf5 Qd3 34.h4 Rg6 35.h5 Rge6 36.Qf2 c5 37.Rf3 Qc2 38.Qe1 Nc6 39.R1f2 Qe4 40.Ng3 Qxg4 41.Kg2 Bxd4 0–1

=== Game 18: Alekhine–Bogoljubov, ½–½ ===
Queen's Pawn Game (ECO A46)
1.d4 Nf6 2.Nf3 e6 3.e3 c5 4.Bd3 d5 5.dxc5 Bxc5 6.a3 0-0 7.b4 Be7 8.Nbd2 a5 9.b5 Nbd7 10.Bb2 Nc5 11.a4 Nxd3+ 12.cxd3 Nd7 13.0-0 f6 14.d4 Nb6 15.Qb3 Bd7 16.Rfc1 Nc8 17.e4 Nb6 18.Ba3 Bxa3 19.Qxa3 Be8 20.e5 Bh5 21.exf6 Qxf6 22.Rc7 Bxf3 23.Nxf3 Nc4 24.Qc3 Rf7 25.Rxf7 Qxf7 26.Ne5 Nxe5 27.dxe5 Rf8 28.Rf1 Ra8 ½–½

=== Game 19: Bogoljubov–Alekhine, ½–½ ===
Queen's Gambit Accepted, Classical (ECO D27)
1.d4 d5 2.Nf3 c6 3.c4 e6 4.e3 Nf6 5.Bd3 c5 6.0-0 dxc4 7.Bxc4 a6 8.Ne5 Qc7 9.Nd2 b5 10.Be2 cxd4 11.exd4 Bb7 12.a4 b4 13.Ndc4 Nd5 14.a5 Be7 15.Qa4+ Nc6 16.Nb6 Rd8 17.Nxd5 Rxd5 18.Bf3 Rb5 19.Nxc6 Bxc6 20.Bf4 Qd7 21.Bxc6 Qxc6 22.Rac1 Qe4 23.Bd6 Bxd6 24.Rc8+ Ke7 25.Rxh8 Qxd4 26.g3 Qxb2 27.Ra8 Qa3 28.Qd1 Qxa5 29.Ra7+ Bc7 30.Qd4 Rd5 31.Qe3 Rd7 32.Rc1 Bb6 33.Rxd7+ Kxd7 34.Qf3 Ke7 35.Qb7+ Kf6 36.Rc6 Bd4 37.Rc7 Qd5 38.Rxf7+ Kg6 39.Rd7 Qxb7 40.Rxb7 Bc3 41.Ra7 Kf5 42.Kf1 b3 43.Rxa6 b2 44.Rb6 Ke4 45.Ke2 Kd4 46.Kd1 Kd3 47.g4 e5 48.f3 Ke3 49.Rb3 Kf4 50.Kc2 Bd4 51.h4 g6 52.h5 gxh5 53.gxh5 h6 54.Kd2 Kg3 55.Ke2 Kf4 56.Rb4 Kg3 57.Rb3 Kf4 58.Rb4 ½–½

=== Game 20: Alekhine–Bogoljubov, ½–½ ===
Queen's Gambit Declined (ECO D52)
1.Nf3 Nf6 2.c4 e6 3.d4 d5 4.Nc3 c6 5.Bg5 Nbd7 6.e3 Qa5 7.Nd2 Bb4 8.Qc2 dxc4 9.Bxf6 Nxf6 10.Nxc4 Bxc3+ 11.Qxc3 Qxc3+ 12.bxc3 Ke7 13.f3 Bd7 14.Ne5 Rhc8 15.Kd2 Rc7 16.Bd3 c5 17.Rhb1 Rd8 18.a4 Bc8 19.a5 Nd7 20.Nxd7 Bxd7 21.Be4 Bc8 22.f4 h6 23.Rb5 f5 24.Bf3 g5 25.g3 g4 26.Bg2 Rdd7 27.Rh1 Kd6 28.Rd1 h5 29.Ke2 cxd4 30.Rxd4+ Ke7 31.Rxd7+ Kxd7 32.e4 a6 33.Re5 Kd6 34.Kd3 h4 35.exf5 exf5 36.Rd5+ Ke7 37.gxh4 Be6 38.Rd4 Rc5 39.Rb4 Rxa5 40.Rxb7+ Kf6 41.Rb6 Ke7 42.Rb7+ Kf6 43.Rb6 Ke7 44.Rb7+ Kf6 ½–½

=== Game 21: Bogoljubov–Alekhine, 0–1 ===
Queen's Pawn Game (ECO D02)
1.d4 d5 2.Nf3 e6 3.c4 a6 4.c5 b6 5.cxb6 c5 6.Nc3 Nd7 7.Na4 c4 8.Bd2 Bd6 9.b3 Bb7 10.e3 cxb3 11.Qxb3 Ne7 12.Bd3 0-0 13.0-0 Nc6 14.Rfc1 e5 15.Bf5 e4 16.Ne1 Nf6 17.Nc5 Qe7 18.g3 Rfb8 19.a4 a5 20.Qb5 Nd8 21.Nxb7 Nxb7 22.Rab1 h5 23.Ng2 g6 24.Bh3 g5 25.Bf5 Qd8 26.Rc6 Be7 27.h4 gxh4 28.Nxh4 Nd6 29.Rxd6 Qxd6 30.b7 Ra7 31.Bc8 Bd8 32.Nf5 Qa6 33.Qc5 Raxb7 34.Rb5 Rxb5 35.Bxa6 Rxc5 36.dxc5 Nd7 37.c6 Ne5 38.Nd4 Rb2 39.Bc3 Rb1+ 40.Kg2 Bb6 41.Bb7 Nf3 42.Nxf3 exf3+ 43.Kxf3 Bc7 44.Ba6 Rc1 45.Bd4 Rxc6 46.Bb7 Rc4 47.Bxd5 Rxa4 48.Ke2 Bd6 49.f4 Bf8 50.f5 Rb4 51.Bc3 Rg4 52.Be5 a4 53.e4 h4 54.Kf3 h3 55.Bf4 Rg7 56.g4 Rh7 57.Bh2 Bd6 58.Bxd6 h2 59.Bxh2 Rxh2 60.e5 a3 61.e6 fxe6 62.Bxe6+ Kf8 63.Kf4 a2 0–1

=== Game 22: Alekhine–Bogoljubov, ½–½ ===
Nimzo-Indian, Classical, Noa Variation (ECO E34)
1.d4 Nf6 2.c4 e6 3.Nc3 Bb4 4.Qc2 d5 5.cxd5 exd5 6.Bg5 h6 7.Bh4 Nbd7 8.e3 0-0 9.Bd3 c5 10.dxc5 Nxc5 11.Ne2 Nxd3+ 12.Qxd3 Be6 13.0-0 Be7 14.Rfd1 Qa5 15.Nd4 Rfc8 16.Rac1 Rc4 17.b3 Rc5 18.Na4 Rxc1 19.Rxc1 Rc8 20.Rxc8+ Bxc8 21.Qc3 Qd8 22.f3 Bd7 23.Nb2 Qb6 24.Nd3 Ne4 25.fxe4 Bxh4 26.exd5 Qg6 27.Qd2 Qe4 28.Nf3 Qxd5 29.Nxh4 Bb5 30.Nf3 Bxd3 31.Kf2 Qf5 32.g4 Qe4 33.Qa5 Ba6 34.Qd8+ Kh7 35.Qd4 Qc2+ 36.Kg3 Bf1 37.Qd5 Qc7+ 38.Kf2 Ba6 39.Qe4+ Kg8 40.Qe8+ Kh7 41.Qe4+ g6 42.h4 ½–½

=== Game 23: Bogoljubov–Alekhine, 1–0 ===
Queen's Gambit Accepted (ECO D23)
1.d4 d5 2.Nf3 Nf6 3.c4 dxc4 4.Qa4+ c6 5.Qxc4 Bf5 6.Nc3 e6 7.g3 Nbd7 8.Bg2 Bc2 9.e3 Be7 10.0-0 0-0 11.a3 a5 12.Qe2 Bg6 13.e4 Qb6 14.h3 Qa6 15.Qe3 c5 16.e5 Nd5 17.Nxd5 exd5 18.Bd2 Be4 19.Bc3 c4 20.Ne1 Bxg2 21.Nxg2 b5 22.f4 Qh6 23.Qf3 b4 24.Bd2 Nb6 25.g4 Qc6 26.f5 f6 27.Nf4 Rfc8 28.exf6 Bxf6 29.Ne6 c3 30.bxc3 Nc4 31.Bf4 Nxa3 32.g5 Bd8 33.Be5 Ra7 34.Qh5 Nc4 35.cxb4 Nxe5 36.dxe5 Bb6+ 37.Kh1 d4+ 38.Qf3 Qxf3+ 39.Rxf3 Rc3 40.Rff1 d3 41.f6 Rc6 42.Nxg7 Rxg7 43.fxg7 axb4 44.Rf6 Bd4 45.Ra8+ Kxg7 46.Rxc6 d2 47.Rc7+ Kg6 48.Rg8+ Kf5 49.Rf8+ Ke4 50.Rf1 Bxe5 51.Rc4+ Kd3 52.Rxb4 Bg3 53.Kg2 Be1 54.Rb1 Bh4 55.Rb3+ Ke2 56.Rb5 Ke3 57.Rd5 Ke2 58.Rf7 1–0

=== Game 24: Alekhine–Bogoljubov, 0–1 ===
Queen's Gambit Declined Slav (ECO D11)
1.d4 d5 2.c4 c6 3.Nf3 Nf6 4.e3 e6 5.Bd3 Nbd7 6.Nbd2 Be7 7.0-0 0-0 8.b3 a5 9.a3 c5 10.cxd5 exd5 11.Bb2 a4 12.bxa4 c4 13.Bc2 Qa5 14.Nb1 Ne4 15.Bxe4 dxe4 16.Nfd2 Nb6 17.Nc3 f5 18.f3 exf3 19.Qxf3 Bd7 20.Qe2 Rac8 21.Rac1 Bf6 22.d5 Rfe8 23.Kh1 Qc5 24.e4 Nxd5 25.Rfe1 Nf4 26.Qe3 Nd3 27.Qxc5 Rxc5 28.Ba1 Bg5 29.Ncb1 fxe4 30.Bc3 Nxc1 31.Rxc1 Bxa4 32.Kg1 Bc6 33.Re1 b5 34.Nf1 Rd5 35.Ng3 Rd3 36.Ne2 Be3+ 37.Kh1 Red8 38.Ng1 Bf2 39.Rf1 e3 0–1

=== Game 25: Bogoljubov–Alekhine, 0–1 ===
Queen's Gambit Declined Slav (ECO D11)
1.d4 d5 2.Nf3 c6 3.c4 dxc4 4.e3 Bg4 5.Bxc4 e6 6.Nc3 Nd7 7.h3 Bh5 8.a3 Ngf6 9.e4 Be7 10.0-0 0-0 11.Bf4 a5 12.Ba2 Qb6 13.g4 Bg6 14.Qe2 Qa6 15.Qe3 b5 16.Ne5 Nxe5 17.Bxe5 b4 18.Bxf6 Bxf6 19.Ne2 bxa3 20.bxa3 c5 21.Rac1 cxd4 22.Nxd4 Bxd4 23.Qxd4 Rfd8 24.Qc4 Qb7 25.f3 h5 26.Qe2 Rd4 27.Qe3 Rd7 28.gxh5 Bxh5 29.Rc5 Bg6 30.Rfc1 Rad8 31.Bc4 Rd1+ 32.Bf1 Rxc1 33.Rxc1 a4 34.Rc4 Rd1 35.Rb4 Qc7 36.f4 Qd8 37.Qf2 f5 38.e5 Be8 39.Rb6 Qc8 40.Rd6 Rc1 41.Qd4 Kh7 42.Kf2 Qc2+ 43.Qd2 Qc5+ 44.Qe3 Rxf1+ 0–1

=== Game 26: Alekhine–Bogoljubov, ½–½ ===
King's Indian, Fianchetto, Yugoslav System (ECO E64)
1.d4 Nf6 2.c4 g6 3.g3 Bg7 4.Bg2 d6 5.Nc3 0-0 6.Nf3 Nbd7 7.0-0 e5 8.b3 Re8 9.Qc2 Ng4 10.dxe5 Ndxe5 11.Nxe5 Nxe5 12.Bb2 h5 13.Rad1 Bf5 14.Qd2 Qc8 15.Nd5 c6 16.Ne3 Bh3 17.f4 Bxg2 18.Nxg2 Ng4 19.Bxg7 Kxg7 20.f5 Qd8 21.Qd4+ Ne5 22.fxg6 fxg6 23.Qxd6 Qxd6 24.Rxd6 Rad8 25.Rfd1 Rxd6 26.Rxd6 ½–½
