= New York 1927 chess tournament =

New York chess tournament of 1927 one of the most elite tournaments in New York City

The New York 1927 chess tournament was an elite chess tournament held in New York City from February 19 to March 24, 1927. Play was held in the magnificent surroundings of the Trade Banquet Hall of the Hotel, Manhattan Square. Julius Finn was the president of the event. The prizes were on a lavish scale: $2,000 for the winner, $1,500 for second place, and $1,000 for third place. Non-prize-winners received $50 for each game won and $25 for each draw.

Capablanca was in superb form and won easily. He also won the $125 First Brilliancy Prize. Alekhine finished second. Later that year, the two played a match for the World Championship, in which Alekhine defeated Capablanca (see World Chess Championship 1927).

The event was a quadruple round-robin tournament. The results and standings are:

#	Player	1	2	3	4	5	6	Total
1	José Raúl Capablanca (Cuba)	****	1½½½	1½1½	½½1½	½½1½	11½1	14
2	Alexander Alekhine (France)	0½½½	****	½01½	½½½½	1½½1	½1½1	11½
3	Aron Nimzowitsch (Denmark)	0½0½	½10½	****	½100	½1½1	½11½	10½
4	Milan Vidmar (Kingdom of Yugoslavia)	½½0½	½½½½	½011	****	½½½½	½½10	10
5	Rudolf Spielmann (Austria)	½½0½	0½½0	½0½0	½½½½	****	½½1½	8
6	Frank Marshall (United States)	00½0	½0½0	½00½	½½01	½½0½	****	6

== Literature ==
- Alekhine, Alexander: International Chess Tournament New York 1927, Dallas, Chess Digest 1972
