= Passed pawn =

Pawn with no opposing pawns to prevent it from advancing to the eighth rank

Position: h6 black pawn, b5 white pawn, e5 white pawn, f5 black pawn, h5 white pawn, c4 white pawn, d4 black pawn, f4 white pawn, g4 white pawn

White's pawns on b5, c4, and e5 are passed pawns. Black's pawn on d4 is passed.

In chess, a passed pawn is a pawn with no opposing pawns to prevent it from advancing to the eighth rank; i.e. there are no opposing pawns in front of it on either the same file or adjacent files. A passed pawn is sometimes colloquially called a passer. Passed pawns are advantageous because only the opponent's pieces can stop them from promoting.

In the diagram, the white pawns on b5, c4, and e5 are passed pawns, and Black's pawn on d4 is a passed pawn. If Black plays ...fxg4, then the black pawn on g4 will be passed, as well as White's pawn on f4.

== Protected passed pawn ==
Botvinnik vs. Capablanca, 1938

Position: a7 black pawn, e7 black queen, g7 black king, h7 black pawn, b6 black pawn, e6 white pawn, f6 black knight, g6 black pawn, d5 black pawn, e5 white queen, c4 black pawn, d4 white pawn, b3 black knight, c3 white pawn, g3 white knight, b2 white bishop, g2 white pawn, h2 white pawn, g1 white king

White to play

A passed pawn that is protected by its own pawn(s) is called a protected passed pawn. In the first diagram in this article, the pawns on the b- and e-files are protected passed pawns. Two or more passed pawns on adjacent files are called connected passed pawns (see connected pawns), and they are very strong. In the diagram at the top, White's b- and c-pawns are connected passed pawns. A pair of connected passed pawns is sometimes called a steamroller. It is often strategically advantageous for the side with connected passed pawns to place them on the same rank and then advance them in tandem, because this makes them more difficult to blockade.

Sometimes, pieces are sacrificed so that a pawn can have a clear path to promotion on the eighth rank. In the example illustrated (Mikhail Botvinnik–José Capablanca, AVRO 1938), in order to capitalize on the passed pawn on e6 and break its blockade by Black's queen, White continued

30. Ba3! Qxa3 31. Nh5+! gxh5 32. Qg5+ Kf8 33. Qxf6+

guaranteeing the e-pawn's promotion. The passed pawn's value is well worth the sacrifice of the bishop in order to clear its path to promotion. The only pieces preventing the e-pawn's promotion are the black queen and knight, and once they are gone, the pawn has a free path to promote. Black's pawns are also helpless to stop it.

== Outside passed pawn ==
Fischer vs. Larsen, 1971

Position: e7 black king, f7 black pawn, g6 black pawn, h5 black pawn, a4 white pawn, c3 white king, g3 white pawn, h2 white pawn

White to move wins because of the outside passed pawn.

An outside passed pawn is a passed pawn that is separated by several files from the rest of the pawns and deflects the opposing king (and sometimes other pieces) from the defense of its other pawns. Such a pawn often constitutes a strong advantage for its owner because the opposing king does not have the range to cover both sides of the board.

In the diagrammed position from the fifth game of the 1971 Candidates match between Bobby Fischer and Bent Larsen, the outside passed pawn on the a-file confers White a winning advantage, even though material is equal. The pawn will force Black's king to keep it from queening, leaving White's king free to capture Black's remaining pawns and win the game. White wins with:

41. Kd4 Kd6
42. a5 f6
43. a6 Kc6
44. a7 Kb7
45. Kd5 h4

If 45...f5 46.h4 wins.

46. Ke6 1–0

An outside passed pawn is also powerful in an endgame with minor pieces. It is not so powerful in an endgame with rooks if the opposing rook can get behind the pawn (see diagram), as in the Tarrasch rule.

Levenfish & Smyslov, 1957

Position: a8 white rook, g7 black king, a6 white pawn, g6 black pawn, f5 black pawn, h5 black pawn, f4 white pawn, h4 white pawn, a3 black rook, g3 white pawn, f2 white king

White to play, draw

== Passed pawns in the endgame ==
Position: f7 black pawn, g7 black pawn, h7 black pawn, f5 white pawn, g5 white pawn, h5 white pawn, g3 black king, g1 white king

White, on move, creates a passed pawn and wins.

Passed pawns are particularly important, often of decisive significance, in the endgame. The position illustrated provides a dramatic example of this. White has no passed pawns and seems to be in desperate straits, since Black's king threatens to fork all of White's pawns with ...Kg4. In fact, White by means of a sacrificial combination creates a passed pawn and wins:

1. g6! fxg6

Or 1...hxg6 2.f6! gxf6 3.h6!

2. h6! gxh6 3. f6!

And White's newly created passed pawn will queen.

If it is Black's move, they must avoid this combination by playing

1... g6!

Not 1...f6 2.h6!, nor 1...h6 2.f6!.

Since passed pawns have no opposing pawns to stop them, the threat of queening often forces the opponent to use a piece to block or capture the pawn, wasting valuable time and immobilizing material or possibly even losing it (as when a defender of the blocking piece is forced to move). Indeed, the value of a far-advanced passed pawn or pawn group is often equal to or even greater than that of a piece.

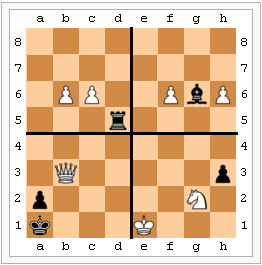
Four examples of advanced passed pawns

Four examples of this are seen in the subdivided diagram.

- In the upper-left quadrant of the board, White's connected passed pawns on the sixth rank are superior to Black's rook. Even if on move, Black cannot stop one of White's pawns from queening.
- Similarly, in the upper-right quadrant, Black's bishop cannot hold back both of White's pawns. White queens a pawn after 1.f7 (1.h7 also works) Bxf7 2.h7 followed by 3.h8=Q.
- In the lower-left quadrant, White's queen cannot stop Black's pawn from queening without stalemating Black.
- The lower-right quadrant highlights how awkward a knight can be in dealing with a passed pawn, especially a rook pawn. White's knight is actually worse than useless in trying to stop Black's pawn. It cannot do so itself, and if White's king (which could catch the pawn if the knight were absent) approaches with 1.Kf2 (hoping for 1...hxg2? 2.Kxg2), Black plays 1...h2! and 2...h1=Q.

A striking (albeit very unusual) example of the power of passed pawns is seen in the conclusion of an endgame study by Leopold Mitrofanov (see diagram).

Position: a8 black king, a7 black bishop, c7 white pawn, a6 white king, b6 white pawn, g5 black queen, e1 black knight

Position after 9.c7!! White's two connected passed pawns defeat Black's army.

Black, with a queen, bishop, and knight, is helpless against White's two passed pawns, which threaten both 10.b7# and 10.c8=Q+ Bb8 11.b7#.

- If 9...Qd5, then 10.c8=Q+ Bb8 11.b7+ Qxb7+ 12.Qxb7#.
- If 9...Qg6, then 10.c8=Q+ Bb8 11.Qb7#.
- If 9...Qa5+, then 10.Kxa5 Kb7 11.bxa7 and Black cannot stop both pawns.

== Quotes ==
- "A passed pawn is a criminal which should be kept under lock and key. Mild measures, such as police surveillance, are not sufficient." — Aron Nimzowitsch

== See also ==
- Backward pawn
- Chess endgame
- Chess piece
- Chess strategy
- Connected pawns
- Doubled pawns
- Isolated pawn
- List of chess terms
- Pawn structure
- Tarrasch rule

== Citations ==
=== References ===
- Golombek, Harry (1977), Golombek's Encyclopedia of Chess, Crown Publishing, ISBN 0-517-53146-1
- Hooper, David; Whyld, Kenneth (1992), The Oxford Companion to Chess (second ed.), Oxford University Press, ISBN 0-19-866164-9
- Levenfish, Grigory; Smyslov, Vasily (1971), Rook endings, Batsford, ISBN 0-7134-0449-3
- Müller, Karsten; Pajeken, Wolfgang (2008), How to Play Chess Endings, Gambit Publications, ISBN 978-1-904600-86-2
