= Bad Kissingen 1928 chess tournament =

The Bad Kissingen 1928 chess tournament was a major international chess tournament, held in Bad Kissingen, Germany in August 1928.

The tournament included most of the leading players at the time, except for world champion Alexander Alekhine. Chessbase listed it as one of the 50 greatest chess tournaments of 1851−1986.

The tournament was won by Efim Bogoljubow, ahead of José Raúl Capablanca, who had lost the World Championship to Alekhine the previous year. It was widely expected that Capablanca would challenge Alekhine to a rematch, but after this win, Bogoljubow emerged as a potential challenger; and Bogoljubow played Alekhine in a world championship match the following year.

== Results ==
#	Player	1	2	3	4	5	6	7	8	9	10	11	12	Total
1	Efim Bogoljubow	*	0	½	1	½	1	½	1	1	1	1	½	8.0
2	José Raúl Capablanca	1	*	½	½	½	½	1	½	1	0	½	1	7.0
3	Max Euwe	½	½	*	1	½	1	0	1	0	½	½	1	6.5
4	Akiba Rubinstein	0	½	0	*	1	½	1	1	½	½	½	1	6.5
5	Aron Nimzowitsch	½	½	½	0	*	½	½	0	½	1	1	1	6.0
6	Richard Réti	0	½	0	½	½	*	1	½	½	½	1	½	5.5
7	Savielly Tartakower	½	0	1	0	½	0	*	1	½	½	½	½	5.0
8	Frank Marshall	0	½	0	0	1	½	0	*	1	1	½	½	5.0
9	Fred Yates	0	0	1	½	½	½	½	0	*	½	½	1	5.0
10	Rudolph Spielmann	0	1	½	½	0	½	½	0	½	*	½	½	4.5
11	Siegbert Tarrasch	0	½	½	½	0	0	½	½	½	½	*	½	4.0
12	Jacques Mieses	½	0	0	0	0	½	½	½	0	½	½	*	3.0
