= José Raúl Capablanca =

Cuban chess player (1888–1942)

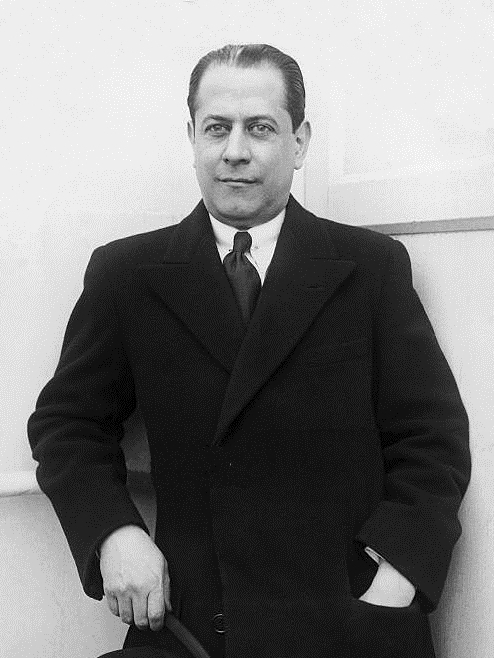
- Capablanca in 1931

Personal information
- Born: José Raúl Capablanca y Graupera; 19 November 1888 Havana, Captaincy General of Cuba, Spanish Empire
- Died: 8 March 1942 (aged 53) New York City, US

Chess career
- Country: Cuba
- World Champion: 1921–1927

José Raúl Capablanca y Graupera (19 November 1888 – 8 March 1942) was a Cuban chess player who was the third world chess champion from 1921 to 1927. A chess prodigy, he was widely renowned for his exceptional endgame skill and speed of play.

Capablanca was born in 1888 in the Castillo del Príncipe, Havana. He beat Cuban champion Juan Corzo in a match on 17 November 1901, two days before his 13th birthday. His victory over Frank Marshall in a 1909 match earned him an invitation to the 1911 San Sebastián tournament, which he won ahead of players such as Akiba Rubinstein, Aron Nimzowitsch and Siegbert Tarrasch. Over the next several years, Capablanca had a strong series of tournament results. After several unsuccessful attempts to arrange a match with then world champion Emanuel Lasker, Capablanca finally won the world chess champion title from Lasker in 1921. Capablanca was undefeated from February 10, 1916, to March 21, 1924, a period that included the world championship match with Lasker.

Capablanca lost the title in 1927 to Alexander Alekhine, who had never beaten Capablanca before the match. Following unsuccessful attempts to arrange a rematch over many years, relations between them became bitter. Capablanca continued his excellent tournament results in this period but withdrew from serious chess in 1931. He made a comeback in 1934, with good results, but also showed symptoms of high blood pressure. He died in 1942 of a brain hemorrhage.

Capablanca excelled in simple positions and endgames; Bobby Fischer said he had "a real light touch". He could play tactical chess when necessary, and had good defensive technique. He wrote several chess books during his career, of which Chess Fundamentals was regarded by Mikhail Botvinnik as the best chess book ever written. Capablanca preferred not to present detailed analysis but focused on critical moments in a game. His style of chess influenced the play of future world champions Bobby Fischer and Anatoly Karpov.

== Biography and career ==
=== Childhood ===
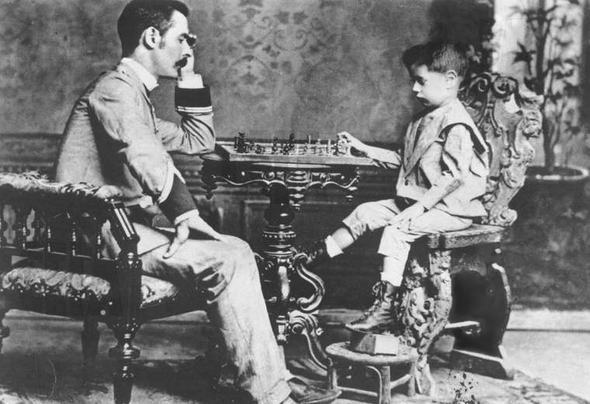
Capablanca playing chess with his father, José María Capablanca, in 1892

José Raúl Capablanca, the second surviving son of a Spanish army officer, José María Capablanca, and a Spanish woman from Catalonia, Matilde María Graupera y Marín, was born in Havana on 19 November 1888. According to Capablanca, he learned to play chess at the age of four by watching his father play with friends, pointed out an illegal move by his father, and then beat his father. At the age of eight he was taken to Havana Chess Club, which had hosted many important contests, but on the advice of a doctor he was not allowed to play frequently. Between November and December 1901, he narrowly beat the Cuban Chess Champion, Juan Corzo, in a match. However, in April 1902 he came in fourth out of six in the National Championship, losing both his games with Corzo. In 1905 Capablanca easily passed the entrance examinations for Columbia College (New York), where he wished to play for Columbia's strong baseball team, and soon was starting shortstop on the freshman team. In the same year he joined the Manhattan Chess Club, and was soon recognized as the club's strongest player. He was particularly dominant in rapid chess, winning a tournament ahead of the reigning World Chess Champion, Emanuel Lasker, in 1906. He represented Columbia on top board in intercollegiate team chess. In 1908 he left the university to concentrate on chess.

According to Columbia University, Capablanca enrolled at Columbia's School of Mines, Engineering and Chemistry in September 1910, to study chemical engineering. Later, his financial support was withdrawn because he preferred playing chess to studying engineering. He left Columbia after one semester to devote himself to chess full-time.

=== Early adult career ===
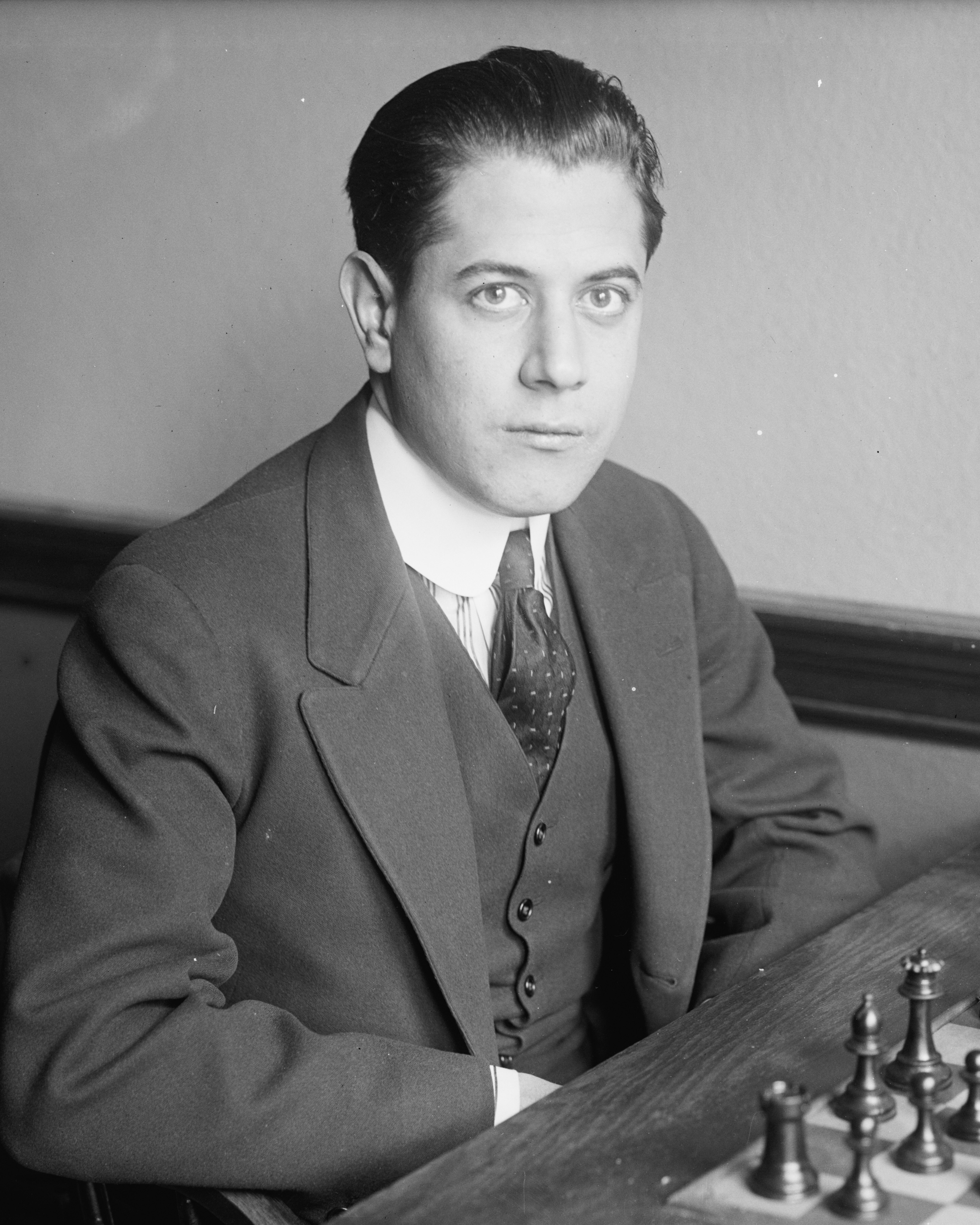
Capablanca in 1915

Capablanca's skill in rapid chess lent itself to simultaneous exhibitions, and his increasing reputation in these events led to a US-wide tour in 1909. Playing 602 games in 27 cities, he scored 96.4%—a much higher percentage than, for example, Géza Maróczy's 88% and Frank Marshall's 86% in 1906. This performance gained him sponsorship for an exhibition match that year against Marshall, the US champion, who had won the 1904 Cambridge Springs tournament ahead of World Champion Emanuel Lasker and Dawid Janowski, and whom Chessmetrics ranks as one of the world's top three players at his peak. Capablanca beat Marshall, 15–8 (8 wins, 1 loss, 14 draws)—a margin comparable to what Lasker achieved against Marshall (8 wins, no losses, 7 draws) in winning his 1907 World Championship match. After the match, Capablanca said that he had never opened a book on chess openings. Following this match, Chessmetrics rates Capablanca the world's third strongest player for most of the period from 1909 through 1912.

Capablanca won six games and drew one in the 1910 New York State Championship. Both Capablanca and Charles Jaffe won their four games in the knock-out preliminaries and met in a match to decide the winner, who would be the first to win two games. The first game was drawn and Capablanca won the second and third games. After another grueling series of simultaneous exhibitions, Capablanca placed second, with 9½ out of 12, in the 1911 National Tournament at New York, half a point behind Marshall, and half a point ahead of Charles Jaffe and Oscar Chajes. Marshall, invited to play in a tournament at San Sebastián, Spain, in 1911, insisted that Capablanca also be allowed to play.

According to David Hooper and Ken Whyld, San Sebastián 1911 was "one of the strongest five tournaments held up to that time", as all the world's leading players competed except the World Champion, Lasker. At the beginning of the tournament, Ossip Bernstein and Aron Nimzowitsch objected to Capablanca's participation because he had not fulfilled the entry condition of winning at least third prize in two master tournaments. Capablanca won brilliantly against Bernstein in the very first round, more simply against Nimzowitsch, and astounded the chess world by taking first place, with six wins, one loss and seven draws, ahead of Akiba Rubinstein, Milan Vidmar, Marshall, Carl Schlechter and Siegbert Tarrasch. His loss, to Rubinstein, was one of the most brilliant achievements of the latter's career. Some European critics grumbled that Capablanca's style was rather cautious, though he conceded fewer draws than any of the next six finishers in the event. Capablanca was now recognized as a serious contender for the world championship.

=== World title contender ===
In 1911, Capablanca challenged Lasker for the World Chess Championship. Lasker accepted his challenge while proposing 17 conditions for the match. Capablanca objected to some of the conditions, which favored Lasker, and the match did not take place.

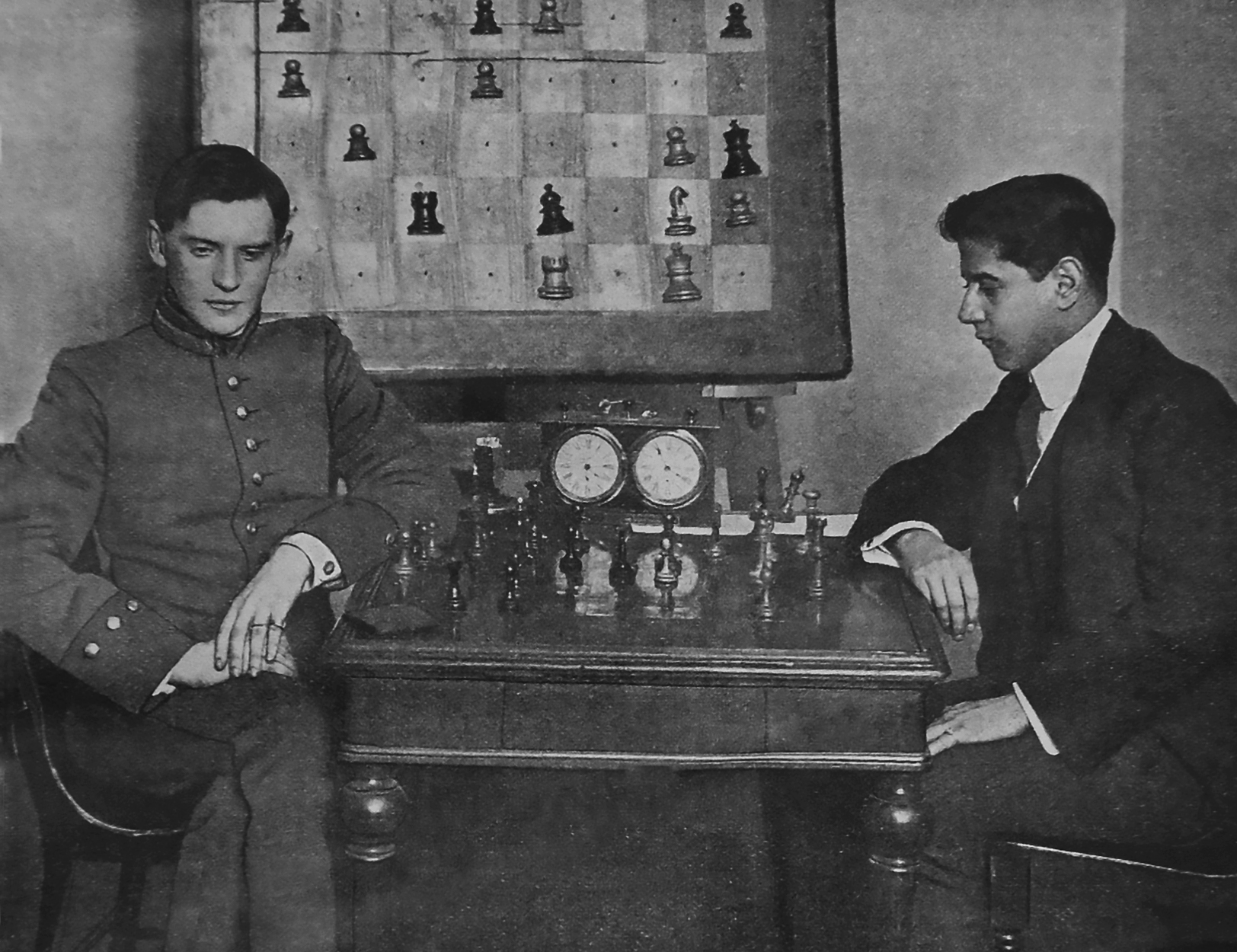
First Match game between Alekhine and Capablanca on 14 December 1913 in an exhibition in St. Petersburg

In 1913, Capablanca won a tournament in New York with 11/13, half a point ahead of Marshall. Capablanca then finished second to Marshall in Havana, scoring 10 out of 14 and losing one of their individual games. The 600 spectators naturally favored their native hero, but sportingly gave Marshall "thunderous applause". In a tournament in New York in 1913, at the Rice Chess Club, Capablanca won all 13 games.

In September 1913, Capablanca accepted a job in the Cuban Foreign Office, which made him financially secure for life. Hooper and Whyld write, "He had no specific duties, but was expected to act as a kind of ambassador-at-large, a well-known figure who would put Cuba on the map wherever he travelled." His first instructions were to go to Saint Petersburg, where he was due to play in a major tournament. On his way, he gave simultaneous exhibitions in London, Paris and Berlin, where he also played two-game matches against Richard Teichmann and Jacques Mieses, winning all four games. In Saint Petersburg, he played similar matches against Alexander Alekhine, Eugene Znosko-Borovsky and Fyodor Duz-Chotimirsky, losing one game to Znosko-Borovsky and winning the rest.

The St. Petersburg 1914 chess tournament was the first in which Capablanca confronted Lasker under tournament conditions. This event was arranged in an unusual way: after a preliminary single round-robin tournament involving 11 players, the top five were to play a second stage in double round-robin format, with total scores from the preliminary tournament carried forward to the second contest. Capablanca placed first in the preliminary tournament, 1½ points ahead of Lasker, who was out of practice and had made a shaky start. Despite a determined effort by Lasker, Capablanca still seemed on course for ultimate victory. But in their second game of the final, Lasker reduced Capablanca to a helpless position and Capablanca was so shaken by this that he blundered away his next game to Tarrasch. Lasker then won his final game, against Marshall, thus finishing half a point ahead of Capablanca and 3½ ahead of Alekhine. Alekhine commented:

His real, incomparable gifts first began to make themselves known at the time of St. Petersburg, 1914, when I too came to know him personally. Neither before nor afterwards have I seen—and I cannot imagine as well—such a flabbergasting quickness of chess comprehension as that possessed by the Capablanca of that epoch. Enough to say that he gave all the St. Petersburg masters the odds of 5–1 in quick games—and won! With all this he was always good-humoured, the darling of the ladies, and enjoyed wonderful good health—really a dazzling appearance. That he came second to Lasker must be entirely ascribed to his youthful levity—he was already playing as well as Lasker.

After the breakdown of his attempt to negotiate a title match in 1911, Capablanca drafted rules for the conduct of future challenges, which were agreed to by the other top players at the 1914 Saint Petersburg tournament, including Lasker, and approved at the Mannheim Congress later that year. The main points were: the champion must be prepared to defend his title once a year; the match should be won by the first player to win six or eight games, whichever the champion preferred; and the stake should be at least £1,000 (worth about £26,000 or $44,000 in 2013 terms).

=== During World War I ===
World War I began in July 1914, bringing international chess to a virtual halt for more than four years. Capablanca won tournaments in New York in 1914, 1915, 1916 (with preliminary and final round-robin stages) and 1918, losing only one game in this sequence. In the 1918 event, Marshall, playing Black against Capablanca, unleashed a complicated gambit, later known as the Marshall Attack, against the Ruy Lopez opening. Some writers later said that Marshall had kept this secret for use against Capablanca since his defeat in their 1909 match. However, Marshall had six opportunities to play the gambit against Capablanca in the intervening years, instead choosing the Petrov Opening on five occasions and the French Defence once. Furthermore, he played the gambit at least once (against Walter Frere) before the Capablanca game. Marshall had the advantage of using a prepared variation, but Capablanca found a way through the complications and won. Capablanca was challenged to a match in 1919 by Borislav Kostić, who had come through the 1918 tournament undefeated to take second place. The match was to go to the first player to win eight games, but Kostić resigned the match after losing the first five. Capablanca considered that he was at his strongest around this time.

=== World Champion ===
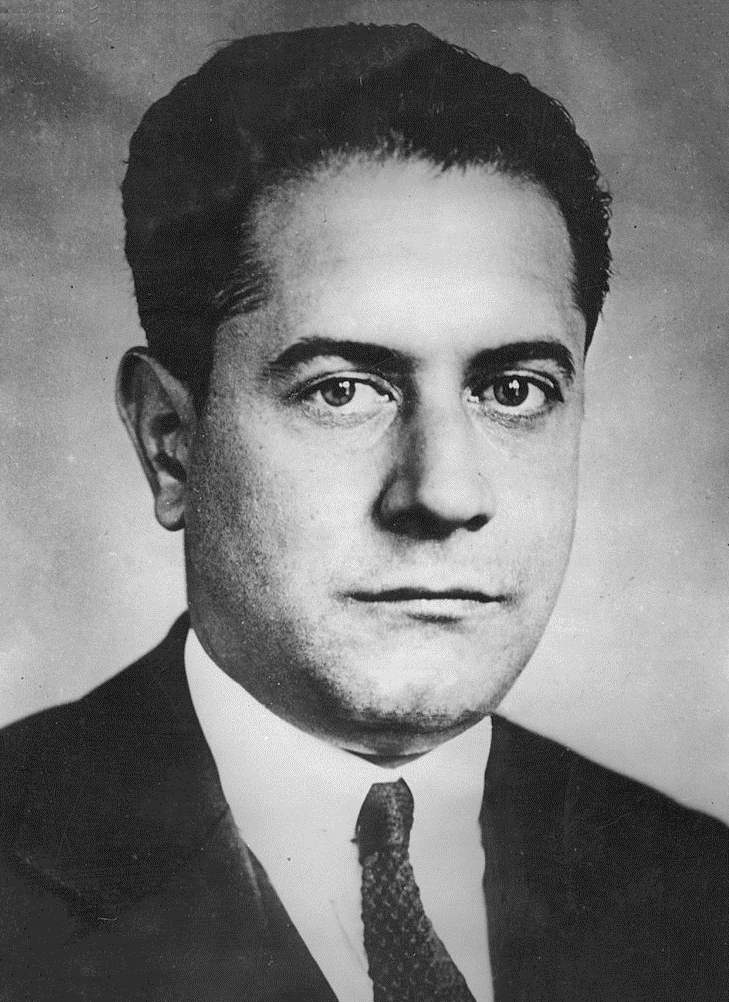
Capablanca in 1920

The Hastings Victory tournament of 1919 was the first international competition on Allied soil since 1914. The field was not strong, and Capablanca won with 10½ points out of 11, one point ahead of Kostić.

In January 1920, Lasker and Capablanca signed an agreement to play a World Championship match in 1921, noting that Capablanca was not free to play in 1920. Because of the delay, Lasker insisted that if he resigned the title, then Capablanca should become World Champion. Lasker had previously included in his agreement before World War I to play Akiba Rubinstein for the title a similar clause that if he resigned the title, it should become Rubinstein's. Lasker then resigned the title to Capablanca on 27 June 1920, saying, "You have earned the title not by the formality of a challenge, but by your brilliant mastery." When Cuban enthusiasts raised $20,000 to fund the match provided it was played in Havana, Lasker agreed in August 1920 to play there, but insisted that he was the challenger as Capablanca was now the champion. Capablanca signed an agreement that accepted this point, and soon afterwards published a letter confirming it.

The match began on 15 March 1921. On 21 April, Lasker played a blunder under time pressure and resigned after 56 moves, leaving the score at four wins for Capablanca, none for Lasker, and ten draws, with ten games left to be played. A few days' rest followed, during which Lasker made a decision to resign the match, remarking, "sic transit gloria mundi!"

Lasker—Capablanca, 21 April 1921

Position: g1 white king, g2 white pawn, e2 white rook, a2 white pawn, h3 white pawn, f3 white rook, d3 white queen, c3 white knight, b3 white pawn, h4 black queen, e4 white pawn, d4 white knight, c4 white pawn, f5 white pawn, h6 black pawn, f6 black knight, d6 black pawn, c6 black pawn, a6 black pawn, g7 black pawn, f7 black pawn, e7 black rook, b7 black pawn, g8 black king, e8 black rook, c8 black bishop

Position of the board in game 14 of the 1921 world championship match after 28. ...Qh4. Lasker played 29. Kh2, costing him the exchange with no compensation after 29. ...Ng4+ 30. Kh1 Ne5 (forking the queen and the rook on f3) 31. Qd2 Nxf3 32. Nxf3.

Reuben Fine and Harry Golombek attributed the one-sided result to Lasker's mysteriously poor form. Fred Reinfeld mentioned speculations that Havana's humid climate weakened Lasker and that he was depressed about the outcome of World War I, especially as he had lost his life savings. On the other hand, Vladimir Kramnik thought that Lasker played quite well and the match was an "even and fascinating fight" until Lasker blundered in the last game. Kramnik explained that Capablanca was 20 years younger, a slightly stronger player, and had more recent competitive practice.

Edward Winter, after a lengthy summary of the facts, concludes, "The press was dismissive of Lasker's wish to confer the title on Capablanca, even questioning the legality of such an initiative, and in 1921 it regarded the Cuban as having become world champion by dint of defeating Lasker over the board." Reference works invariably give Capablanca's reign as titleholder as beginning in 1921, not 1920.

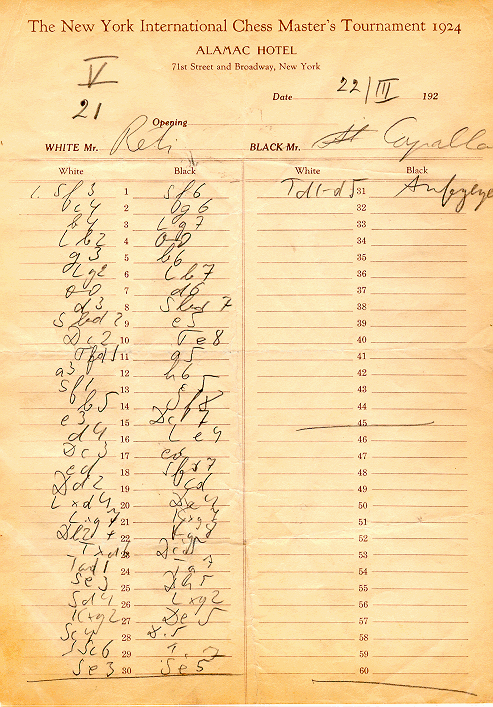
The score sheet of Capablanca's defeat by Richard Réti in the New York 1924 chess tournament, his first loss in eight years

Capablanca won the London tournament of 1922 with 13 points in 15 games with no losses, ahead of Alekhine with 11½, Milan Vidmar (11), and Akiba Rubinstein (10½). During this event, Capablanca proposed the "London Rules" to regulate future World Championship negotiations: the first player to win six games would win the match; playing sessions would be limited to 5 hours; the time limit would be 40 moves in 2½ hours; the champion must defend his title within one year of receiving a challenge from a recognized master; the champion would decide the date of the match; the champion was not obliged to accept a challenge for a purse of less than US$10,000 (about $260,000 in 2006 terms); 20% of the purse was to be paid to the title holder and the remainder divided, 60% to the winner of the match, and 40% to the loser; the highest purse bid must be accepted. Alekhine, Efim Bogoljubow, Géza Maróczy, Richard Réti, Rubinstein, Tartakower and Vidmar promptly signed them. Between 1921 and 1923 Alekhine, Rubinstein and Nimzowitsch all challenged Capablanca, but only Alekhine could raise the money, in 1927.

In 1922, Capablanca had also given a simultaneous exhibition in Cleveland against 103 opponents, the largest in history up to that time, winning 102 and drawing one—setting a record for the best winning percentage ever in a large simultaneous exhibition.

After beginning with four draws, followed by a loss, Capablanca placed second at the New York 1924 chess tournament with the score of 14½/20 (+10−1=9), 1½ points behind Lasker, and 2½ ahead of third-placed Alekhine. Capablanca's defeat by Réti in the fifth round was his first in serious competition in eight years. He made another bad start at the Moscow 1925 chess tournament, and could only fight back to third place, two points behind Bogoljubow and ½ point behind Lasker. Capablanca won at Lake Hopatcong, 1926 with 6 points out of 8, ahead of Abraham Kupchik (5) and Maroczy (4½).

A group of Argentinian businessmen, backed by a guarantee from the president of Argentina, promised the funds for a World Championship match between Capablanca and Alekhine in 1927. Since Nimzowitsch had challenged before Alekhine, Capablanca gave Nimzowitsch until 1 January 1927, to provide a deposit in order to arrange a match. When this did not materialize, a Capablanca–Alekhine match was agreed, to begin in September 1927.

In the New York 1927 chess tournament, held from 19 February to 23 March 1927, six of the world's strongest masters played a quadruple round-robin, with the others being Alekhine, Rudolf Spielmann, Milan Vidmar, Nimzowitsch and Marshall, with Bogoljubow and Lasker absent. Before the tournament, Capablanca wrote that he had "more experience but less power" than in 1911, that he had peaked in 1919 and that some of his competitors had become stronger in the meantime. But Capablanca had overwhelming success: he finished undefeated with 14/20, winning the mini-matches with each of his rivals, 2½ points ahead of second-place Alekhine, and won the "best game" prize for a win over Spielmann.

In December 1921, shortly after becoming World Champion, Capablanca married Gloria Simoni Betancourt. They had a son, José Raúl Jr., in 1923 and a daughter, Gloria, in 1925. According to Capablanca's second wife, Olga, his first marriage broke down fairly soon, and he and Gloria had affairs. Both his parents died during his reign, his father in 1923 and mother in 1926.

=== Losing the title ===
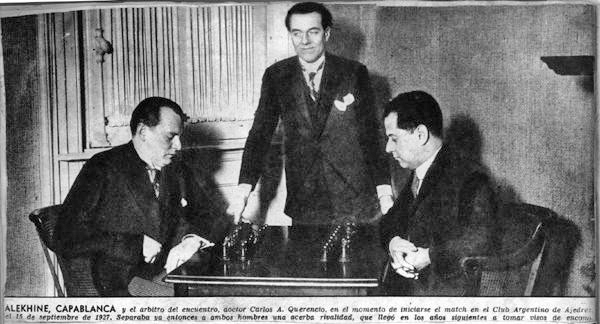
Alekhine vs. Capablanca

Since Capablanca had won the New York 1927 chess tournament overwhelmingly and had never lost a game to Alekhine, most pundits regarded the Cuban as the clear favorite in their World Chess Championship 1927 match. But Alekhine won the match, played from September to November 1927 at Buenos Aires, by 6 wins, 3 losses, and 25 draws—the longest formal World Championship match until the contest in 1984–85 between Anatoly Karpov and Garry Kasparov. Alekhine's victory surprised almost the entire chess world. Capablanca stated that his usual good form had failed him and that he was not his normal self during the match. He also praised Alekhine stating that he "is worthy of any man’s steel". After Capablanca's death, Alekhine expressed surprise at his own victory, since in 1927 he had not thought he was superior to Capablanca, and he suggested that Capablanca had been overconfident. Capablanca entered the match with no technical or physical preparation, while Alekhine got himself into good physical condition and had thoroughly studied Capablanca's play. According to Kasparov, Alekhine's research uncovered many small inaccuracies, which occurred because Capablanca was unwilling to concentrate intensely. Vladimir Kramnik commented that this was the first contest in which Capablanca had no easy wins. Luděk Pachman suggested that Capablanca, who was unaccustomed to losing games or to any other type of setback, became depressed over his unnecessary loss of the 11th game in a grueling endgame featuring errors by both players. The match became somewhat notorious for its extremely lopsided use of the Queen's Gambit Declined; all games after the first two used this opening, and Capablanca's defeat has been partially attributed to his unwillingness to attempt any other openings.

Immediately after winning the match, Alekhine announced that he was willing to give Capablanca a rematch, on the same terms that Capablanca had required as champion—the challenger must provide a stake of US$10,000, of which more than half would go to the defending champion even if he was defeated. Alekhine had challenged Capablanca in the early 1920s, but Alekhine could not raise the money until 1927. On February 10 1928, Capablanca wrote to FIDE President Alexander Rueb suggesting changes to the format for future World Championship matches. Alekhine objected to this, stating that he and Capablanca had both agreed after the match that a rematch would be held under identical conditions, and that Capablanca was now changing the match format which he had "imposed" on his rivals in the 1922 London Rules agreement. Capablanca replied by stating that he did not seek a change in the conditions of his rematch with Alekhine, and that he was offering guidance to FIDE for future matches which could happen under their watch. He stated that it cannot be expected that the format for the World Championship would stay unaltered for a unlimited amount of years, and said he "could not understand" Alekhine publishing his letter he had sent to Rueb, of which he had also sent Alekhine a courtesy copy. After Capablanca's death, Alekhine wrote that Capablanca's demand for a $10,000 stake was an attempt to avoid challenges. Negotiations dragged on for several years, often breaking down when agreement seemed in sight. Their relationship became bitter, and Alekhine demanded much higher appearance fees for tournaments in which Capablanca also played.

=== Post-championship and partial retirement ===
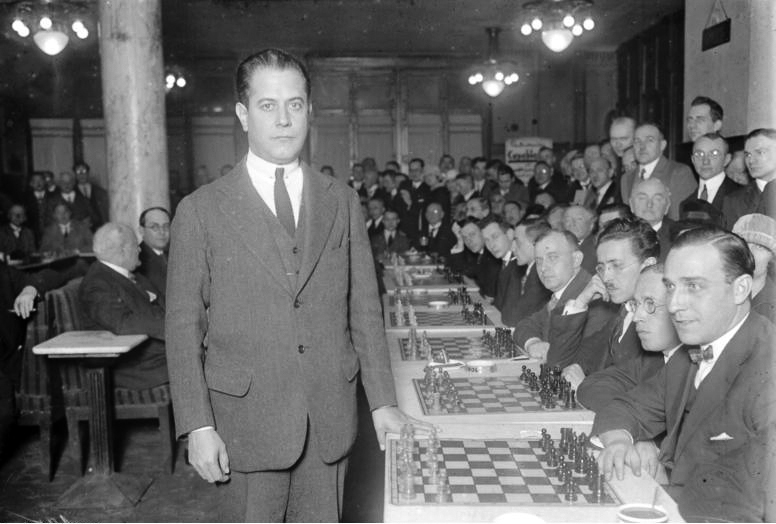
Giving a simultaneous display on thirty boards in Berlin, June 1929

After losing the World Championship in late 1927, Capablanca played more often in tournaments, hoping to strengthen his claim for a rematch. From 1928 through 1931, he won six first prizes, also finishing second twice and one joint second. But Capablanca and Alekhine never played in the same tournament during this period, not meeting until the Nottingham 1936 chess tournament after Alekhine had lost the world title to Euwe the previous year, and Capablanca was unable to organise a rematch with Alekhine. One of the second-place finishes was to Efim Bogoljubow at the Bad Kissingen 1928 chess tournament; and in 1929, with offers for matches from both Bogoljubow and Capablanca, Alekhine chose to play Bogoljubow for the World Championship.

In late 1931, Capablanca also won a match (+2−0=8) against Euwe, whom Chessmetrics ranks sixth in the world at the time. But by the early 1930s there were other players looking more likely to challenge Alekhine, including Salo Flohr, Max Euwe and Isaac Kashdan.

Despite these excellent results, Capablanca's play showed signs of decline: his play slowed from the speed of his youth, with occasional time trouble; he continued to produce many superb games, but also made some gross blunders. Chessmetrics nonetheless ranks Capablanca as the second strongest player in the world (after Alekhine) from his loss of the title through to autumn 1932, except for a brief appearance in the top place.

Alekhine's offer to play Capablanca in a rematch if $10,000 could be raised came to naught due to the Great Depression. After winning an event at New York in 1931, he withdrew from serious chess, perhaps disheartened by his inability to secure a rematch with Alekhine, and played only less serious games at the Manhattan Chess Club and simultaneous displays. On 6 December 1933, Capablanca won all 9 of his games in one of the club's weekly rapid chess tournaments, finishing 2 points ahead of Samuel Reshevsky, Reuben Fine and Milton Hanauer.

It is from this period that the only surviving voiced film footage survives. He is with Euwe and Dutch radio sports journalist Han Hollander. Hollander asks Capablanca for his views on the upcoming world Championship match between Euwe and Alekhine in October of that year (1935). Capablanca replies: "Dr. Alekhine's game is 20% bluff. Dr. Euwe's game is clear and straightforward. Dr. Euwe's game—not so strong as Alekhine's in some respects—is more evenly balanced." Then Euwe gives his assessment in Dutch.

=== Return to competitive chess ===
At first Capablanca did not divorce his first wife, as he had not intended to remarry. Olga, Capablanca's second wife, wrote that she met him in the late spring of 1934; by late October the pair were deeply in love, and Capablanca recovered his ambition to prove he was the world's best player. In 1938 he divorced his first wife and married Olga on 20 October, about a month before the AVRO tournament.

Starting his comeback at the Hastings tournament of 1934–35, Capablanca finished fourth, although coming ahead of Mikhail Botvinnik and Andor Lilienthal. He placed second by ½ point in the Margate tournaments of 1935 and 1936. At Moscow 1935 Capablanca finished fourth, 1 point behind the joint winners, while Lasker's third place at the age of 66 was hailed as "a biological miracle." The following year, Capablanca won an even stronger tournament in Moscow, one point ahead of Botvinnik and 3½ ahead of Salo Flohr, who took third place; A month later, he shared first place with Botvinnik at Nottingham, with a score of (+5−1=8), losing only to Flohr. The loss to Flohr was because of being disturbed while in time trouble by the bystander Euwe. Alekhine placed sixth, only one point behind the joint winners. These tournaments of 1936 were the last two Lasker played, and the only ones in which Capablanca finished ahead of Lasker, now 67. During these triumphs Capablanca began to suffer symptoms of high blood pressure. He tied for second place at Semmering in 1937, then could only finish seventh of the eight players at the 1938 AVRO tournament, an elite contest designed to select a challenger for Alekhine's world title.

Capablanca's high blood pressure was not correctly diagnosed and treated until after the AVRO tournament, and caused him to lose his train of thought towards the end of playing sessions. In 1940, he had extremely dangerous hypertension of 210 systolic/180 diastolic (hypertensive crisis is 180/120 or above, and even after treatment Capablanca had 180/130).

After winning at Paris in 1938 and placing second in a slightly stronger tournament at Margate in 1939, Capablanca played for Cuba in the 8th Chess Olympiad, in Buenos Aires, and won the gold medal for the best performance on the top board. While Capablanca and Alekhine were both representing their countries in Buenos Aires, Capablanca made a final attempt to arrange a World Championship match. Alekhine declined, saying he was obliged to be available to defend his adopted homeland, France, as World War II had just broken out. Capablanca announced in advance that he would not play Alekhine if their teams met.

=== Death ===
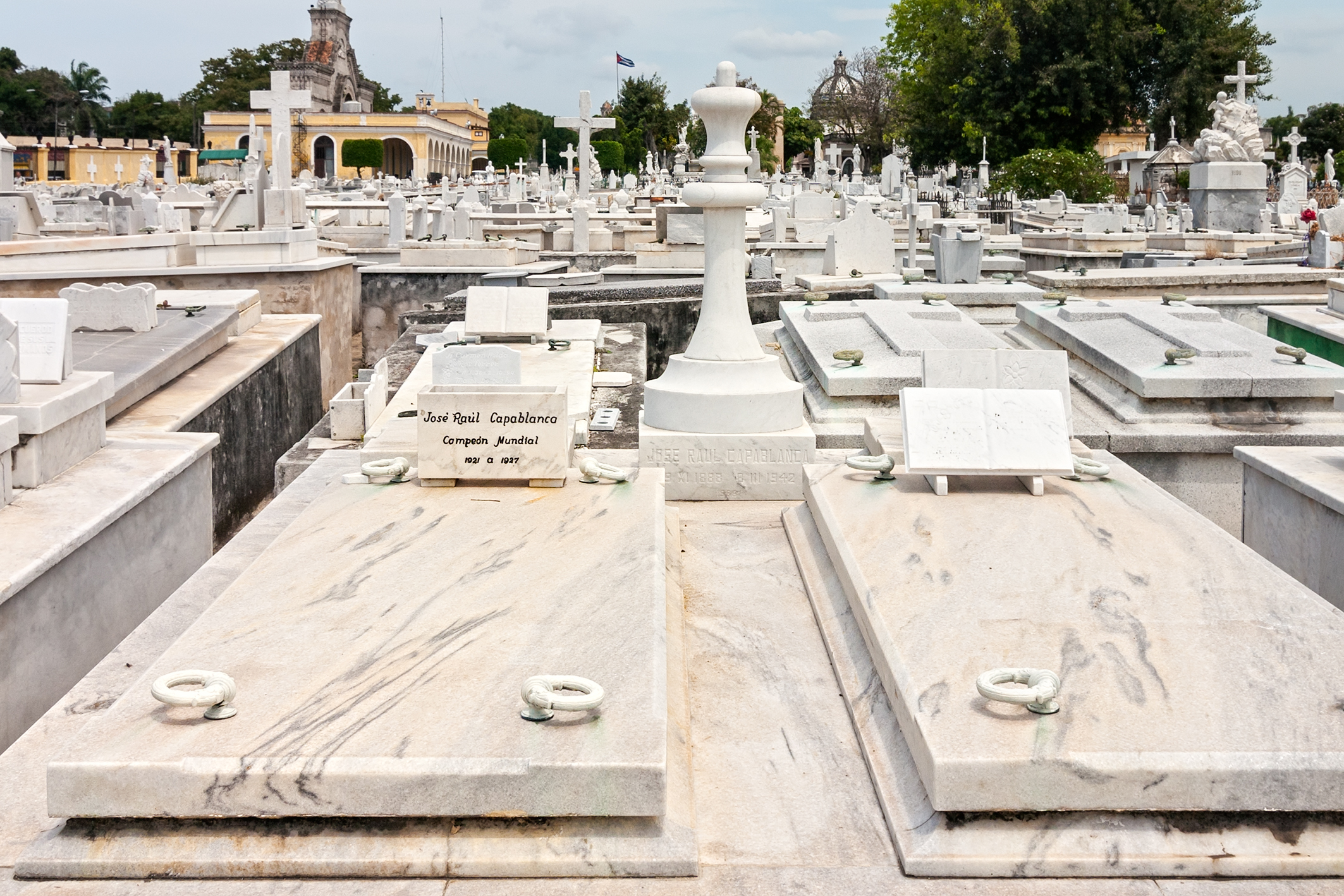
Capablanca's grave at Colón Cemetery

Not long before his death, his familial hypertension had shot up to the hazardous 200–240/160+. The day before his fatal stroke, his vascular specialist Dr. Schwarzer strongly advised him that his life was endangered unless he totally relaxed, but Capablanca said that he could not because his ex-wife and children had started court proceedings against him. The doctor blamed his death on "his troubles and aggravation".

On 7 March 1942, Capablanca was observing a skittles game and chatting with friends at the Manhattan Chess Club in New York City, when he asked for help removing his coat, and collapsed shortly afterward. Eminent physician Eli Moschcowitz administered first aid and then arranged an ambulance. He was taken to Mount Sinai Hospital, where he died at 6:00 a.m. the next day. Emanuel Lasker had died in the same hospital only a year earlier. The cause of death was given as "a cerebral hemorrhage provoked by hypertension", in particular a hypertensive thalamic hemorrhage. The hospital admissions report stated:

When admitted to Mt. Sinai Hospital, the examination showed: Patient critically ill in deep coma, unreceptive to nocioceptive stimuli, unequal pupils with the left one dilated (fixed and unresponsive to light), left facial palsy, left hemiplegia, globally depressed tendinous reflexes and arterial tension 280/140. A lumbar puncture was performed which showed hemorrhagic cerebrospinal fluid (CSF) with a pressure of 500 mm of water.

The full autopsy, by Drs. Moschcowitz, Prill, and Levin, showed that the right thalamus was almost totally destroyed, and in its place was a hematoma 2 inches wide and 2 inches high. The whole ventricular system and cisterna magna were flooded with blood. The gyri were flattened and sulci narrowed, consistent with years of extreme hypertension. He also had severe cardiomegaly or enlarged heart, in his case 575 g instead of the normal 300–350 g, including left ventricular hypertrophy (LVH): 3 cm [hypertrophy] of the left ventricle wall. This wall had a number of subendiocardial hemorrhages, which was later proved to be common in patients with severe intercranial hypertension. This caused the release of a large amount of vasoactive substances into the bloodstream, including acetylcholine and noradrenaline that caused these hemorrhages.

The lumbar puncture was a bad idea, as intracranial hypertension is now a well-known contraindication because it releases the pressure of the cerebrospinal fluid counteracting the herniating force of the hypertension. But neurosurgeon Orlando Hernández-Meilán has said that it made no difference, as Capablanca could not have been revived even if the best modern medicine had been available.

Capablanca was given a public funeral in Havana's Colón Cemetery on 15 March 1942.

==== Tributes ====
Alekhine wrote in a tribute to Capablanca: "Capablanca was snatched from the chess world much too soon. With his death, we have lost a very great chess genius whose like we shall never see again." Lasker once said: "I have known many chess players, but only one chess genius: Capablanca."

An annual Capablanca Memorial tournament has been held in Cuba, most often in Havana, since 1962.

== Assessment ==
=== Playing strength and style ===
As an adult, Capablanca lost only 34 serious games. He was undefeated from 10 February 1916, when he lost to Oscar Chajes in the New York 1916 tournament, to 21 March 1924, when he lost to Richard Réti in the New York International tournament. During this streak, which included his 1921 World Championship match against Lasker, Capablanca played 63 games, winning 40 and drawing 23. In fact, only Marshall, Lasker, Alekhine and Rudolf Spielmann won two or more serious games from the mature Capablanca, though in each case, their overall lifetime scores were minus (Capablanca beat Marshall +20−2=28, Lasker +6−2=16, Alekhine +9−7=33), except for Spielmann who was level (+2−2=8). Of top players, only Keres had a narrow plus score against him (+1−0=5). Keres's win was at the AVRO 1938 chess tournament, during which tournament Capablanca turned 50, while Keres was 22.

Statistical ranking systems place Capablanca high among the greatest players of all time. Nathan Divinsky and Raymond Keene's book Warriors of the Mind (1989) ranks him fifth, behind Garry Kasparov, Anatoly Karpov, Bobby Fischer and Mikhail Botvinnik—and immediately ahead of Emanuel Lasker. In his 1978 book The Rating of Chessplayers, Past and Present, Arpad Elo gave retrospective ratings to players based on their performance over the best five-year span of their career. He concluded that Capablanca was the strongest of those surveyed, with Lasker and Botvinnik sharing second place. Chessmetrics (2005) is rather sensitive to the length of the periods being compared, and ranks Capablanca between third and fourth strongest of all time for peak periods ranging in length from one to 15 years. Its author, the statistician Jeff Sonas, concluded that Capablanca had more years in the top three than anyone except Lasker, Karpov and Kasparov—though Alekhine had more years in the top two positions. A 2006 study found that Capablanca was the most accurate of all the World Champions when compared with computer analysis of World Championship match games. This analysis was criticized for using a second-rank chess program, Crafty, modified to limit its calculations to six moves by each side, and for favoring players whose style matched that of the program; however a 2011 computer analysis by Bratko and Guid using the stronger engines Rybka 2 and Rybka 3 found similar results to the 2006 Crafty analysis for Capablanca.

Boris Spassky, World Champion from 1969 to 1972, considered Capablanca the best player of all time. Bobby Fischer, who held the title from 1972 to 1975, admired Capablanca's "light touch" and ability to see the right move very quickly. Fischer reported that in the 1950s, older members of the Manhattan Chess Club spoke of Capablanca's performances with awe.

Capablanca excelled in simple positions and endgames, and his positional judgment was outstanding, so much so that most attempts to attack him came to grief without any apparent defensive efforts on his part. But he could play great tactical chess when necessary—most famously in the 1918 Manhattan Chess Club Championship tournament, when Marshall sprang a deeply analyzed prepared variation on him, which he refuted while playing under the normal time limit (although ways have since been found to strengthen the Marshall Attack). He was also capable of using aggressive tactical play to drive home a positional advantage, provided he considered it safe and the most efficient way to win, for example against Spielmann in the 1927 New York tournament.

=== Influence on the game ===
Capablanca did not found any school per se, but his style influenced world champions Fischer, Karpov, and Botvinnik. Alekhine received schooling from Capablanca in positional play before their fight for the world title made them bitter enemies.

As a chess writer, Capablanca did not present large amounts of detailed analysis, instead focusing on the critical moments in a game. His writing style was plain and easy to understand. Botvinnik regarded Capablanca's book Chess Fundamentals as the best chess book ever written. Capablanca in a lecture and in his book A Primer of Chess pointed out that while the bishop was usually stronger than the knight, queen and knight was usually better than queen and bishop, especially in endings—the bishop merely mimics the queen's diagonal move, while the knight can immediately reach squares the queen cannot. Research is divided over Capablanca's conclusion: in 2007, Glenn Flear found little difference, while in 1999, Larry Kaufman, analysing a large database of games, concluded that results very slightly favored queen plus knight. John Watson wrote in 1998 that an unusually large proportion of queen and knight versus queen and bishop endings are drawn, and that most decisive games are characterized by the winning side having one or more obvious advantages in that specific game.

=== Personality ===
Early in his chess career, Capablanca received some criticism, mainly in Britain, for the allegedly conceited description of his accomplishments in his first book, My Chess Career. He therefore took the unprecedented step of including virtually all of his tournament and match defeats up to that time in Chess Fundamentals, together with an instructive group of his victories. Nevertheless, his preface to the 1934 edition of Chess Fundamentals is confident that the "reader may therefore go over the contents of the book with the assurance that there is in it everything he needs." Julius du Mont wrote that he knew Capablanca well and could vouch that he was not conceited. In du Mont's opinion, critics should understand the difference between the merely gifted and the towering genius of Capablanca, and the contrast between the British tendency towards modesty and the Latin and American tendency to say "I played this game as well as it could be played" if he honestly thought that was true. Capablanca himself said, in his author's note prefacing My Chess Career: "Conceit I consider a foolish thing, but more foolish still is the false modesty that vainly attempts to conceal which all facts tend to prove." Fischer also admired this frankness. Du Mont also said that Capablanca was rather sensitive to criticism, and chess historian Edward Winter documented a number of examples of self-criticism in My Chess Career.

Despite his achievements Capablanca appeared more interested in baseball than in chess, which he described as "not a difficult game to learn and it is an enjoyable game to play." His second wife, Olga, thought he resented that chess had dominated his life, and wished he could have studied music or medicine.

== Capablanca chess ==
	a	b	c	d	e	f	g	h	i	j
8	a8 black rook	b8 black knight	c8 black princess	d8 black bishop	e8 black queen	f8 black king	g8 black bishop	h8 black empress	i8 black knight	j8 black rook	8
7	a7 black pawn	b7 black pawn	c7 black pawn	d7 black pawn	e7 black pawn	f7 black pawn	g7 black pawn	h7 black pawn	i7 black pawn	j7 black pawn	7
6	a6	b6	c6	d6	e6	f6	g6	h6	i6	j6	6
5	a5	b5	c5	d5	e5	f5	g5	h5	i5	j5	5
4	a4	b4	c4	d4	e4	f4	g4	h4	i4	j4	4
3	a3	b3	c3	d3	e3	f3	g3	h3	i3	j3	3
2	a2 white pawn	b2 white pawn	c2 white pawn	d2 white pawn	e2 white pawn	f2 white pawn	g2 white pawn	h2 white pawn	i2 white pawn	j2 white pawn	2
1	a1 white rook	b1 white knight	c1 white princess	d1 white bishop	e1 white queen	f1 white king	g1 white bishop	h1 white empress	i1 white knight	j1 white rook	1
	a	b	c	d	e	f	g	h	i	j

Capablanca Chess. The archbishops (bishop+knight compounds) start on c1/c8; the chancellors (rook+knight compounds), on h1/h8.

In an interview in 1925, Capablanca denied reports that he thought chess had already currently reached its limit because it was easy for top players to obtain a draw. He was concerned, however, that the accelerating development of chess technique and opening knowledge might cause such stagnation in 50 years. Hence, he suggested the adoption of a 10×8 board with two extra pieces per side:

- a chancellor that combines the movements of a rook and a knight;
- an archbishop that combines the movements of a bishop and a knight. This piece would be able to deliver checkmate on its own, which none of the conventional pieces can do, but checkmate cannot be forced without the help of its own king. He thought this would prevent technical knowledge from becoming such a dominant factor, at least for a few centuries.

Capablanca and Edward Lasker experimented with 10×10 and 10×8 boards, using the same expanded set of pieces. They preferred the 8-rank version as it encouraged combat to start earlier, and their games typically lasted 20 to 25 moves. Contrary to the claims of some critics, Capablanca proposed this variant while he was world champion, not as sour grapes after losing his title.

Similar 10×8 variants had previously been described in 1617 by Pietro Carrera and in 1874 by Henry Bird, differing only in how the new pieces were placed in each side's back row. Subsequent variants inspired by Capablanca's experimentation have been proposed, including Grand Chess (a 10×10 board with pawns on the third rank) and Embassy Chess (the Grand Chess setup on a 10×8 board).

== Capablanca's writings ==
- Capablanca, J. R. (1913). Torneo internacional de ajedrez: celebrado en La Habana del 15 de febrero al 6 de marzo de 1913 (in Spanish). Havana: Imp. del Avisador comercial. (2013 Ishi Press International edition ISBN 0-486-20604-1). This is the only tournament book he wrote. Translated into English by Edward Winter as Havana 1913. It appeared as a British Chess Magazine reprint, Quarterly No. 18, in 1976.
- Capablanca, J. R. (1920). My Chess Career. New York: The Macmillan Company. Preface by Julius du Mont. Published simultaneously by G. Bell and Sons, Ltd. of London. Republished by Dover in 1966. Republished by Hardinge Simpole Limited, 2003, ISBN 1-84382-091-9.
- Capablanca, José R. (1921). Chess Fundamentals. New York: Harcourt, Brace and Company. This was the first part of a planned three-volume treatise on chess. Republished by Everyman Chess, 1994, ISBN 4871878414. Revised and updated by Nick de Firmian in 2006, ISBN 0-8129-3681-7.
- The World's Championship Chess Match Played at Havana Between Jose Raul Capablanca and Dr. Emanuel Lasker: With an Introduction, the Scores of All the Games Annotated by the Champion, Together with Statistical Matter and the Biographies of the Two Masters. Originally published in 1921 by American Chess Bulletin. Republished in 1977 by Dover, together with a book on the 1927 match with annotations by Frederick Yates and William Winter, as World's Championship Matches, 1921 and 1927, ISBN 0-486-23189-5.
- Capablanca, José R. (1935). A Primer of Chess. New York: Harcourt, Brace and Company. Preface by Benjamin Anderson. This was the second book after Chess Fundamentals in Capablanca's projected trilogy; the last part would have dealt mainly with openings. Republished in 2002 by Harvest Books, ISBN 0-15-602807-7.
- Capablanca, José Raoul (1966). Last Lectures. New York: Simon and Schuster. Foreword by Olga Capablanca. These lectures were delivered in Spanish on the radio to Latin American listeners shortly before Capablanca's death in 1942.

== Tournament results ==
The following table gives Capablanca's placings and scores in tournaments. The first "Score" column gives the number of points out of the total possible. In the second "Score" column, "+" indicates the number of won games, "−" the number of losses, and "=" the number of draws.

Date	Location	Place	Score		Notes
1910	(United States) New York State	1st	6½/7	+6−0=1	Capablanca won six games and drew one in the 1910 New York State Championship. Both Capablanca and Charles Jaffe won their four games in the knock-out preliminaries and met in a match to decide the winner, who would be the first to win two games. The first game was drawn and Capablanca won the second and third games.
1911	(United States) New York	2nd	9½/12	+8−1=3	Marshall was 1st ahead of Capablanca.
1911	San Sebastián (Spain)	1st	9½/14	+6−1=7	Ahead of Akiba Rubinstein and Milan Vidmar (9), Frank James Marshall (8½) and 11 other world-class players. His only loss was to Rubinstein, and his win against Ossip Bernstein was awarded the brilliancy prize.
1913	(United States) New York	1st	11/13	+10−1=2	Ahead of Marshall (10½), Charles Jaffe (9½) and Dawid Janowski (9)
1913	(Cuba) Havana	2nd	10/14	+8−2=4	Behind Marshall (10½); ahead of Janowski (9) and five others. Capablanca annotated this tournament. His win against Corzo in the first round was awarded the brilliancy prize.
1913	(United States) New York	1st	13/13	+13−0=0	Ahead of Oldřich Duras
1914	(Russian Empire) St. Petersburg	2nd	13/18	+10−2=6	Behind Emanuel Lasker (13½); ahead of Alexander Alekhine (10), Siegbert Tarrasch (8½) and Marshall (8). This tournament had an unusual structure: there was a preliminary tournament in which eleven players played each other player once; the top five players then played a separate final tournament in which each player who made the "cut" played the other finalists twice; but their scores from the preliminary tournament were carried forward. Even the preliminary tournament would now be considered a "super-tournament". Capablanca "won" the preliminary tournament by 1½ points without losing a game, but Lasker achieved a plus score against all his opponents in the final tournament and finished with a combined score ½ point ahead of Capablanca's.
1915	(United States) New York	1st	13/14	+12−0=2	Ahead of Marshall (12) and six others.
1916	(United States) New York	1st	14/17	+12−1=4	Ahead of Janowski (11) and 11 others. The structure was similar to that of St. Petersburg 1914.
1918	(United States) New York	1st	10½/12	+9−0=3	Ahead of Boris Kostić (9), Marshall (7), and four others
1919	(United Kingdom) Hastings	1st	10½/11	+10−0=1	Ahead of Kostić (9½), Sir George Thomas (7), Frederick Yates (7) and eight others
1922	(United Kingdom) London	1st	13/15	+11−0=4	Ahead of Alekhine (11½), Vidmar (11), Rubinstein (10½), Efim Bogoljubow (9), and 11 other players, mostly very strong
1924	(United States) New York	2nd	14½/20	+10−1=9	Behind Lasker (16); ahead of Alekhine (12), Marshall (11), Richard Réti (10½) and six others, mostly very strong
1925	(Soviet Union) Moscow	3rd	13½/20	+9−2=9	Behind Bogoljubow (15½) and Lasker (14); ahead of Marshall (12½) and a mixture of strong international players and rising Soviet players
1926	(United States) Lake Hopatcong	1st	6/8	+4−0=4	Ahead of Abraham Kupchik (5), Géza Maróczy (4½), Marshall (3) and Edward Lasker (1½)
1927	(United States) New York	1st	14/20	+8−0=12	Ahead of Alekhine (11½), Aron Nimzowitsch (10½), Vidmar (10), Rudolf Spielmann (8) and Marshall (6).
1928	(Weimar Republic) Bad Kissingen 1928 chess tournament	2nd	7/11	+4−1=6	Behind Bogoljubow (8); ahead of Max Euwe (6½), Rubinstein (6½), Nimzowitsch (6) and seven other strong masters
1928	(Hungary) Budapest	1st	7/9	+5−0=4	Ahead of Marshall (6), Hans Kmoch (5), Spielmann (5) and six others
1928	(Weimar Republic) Berlin	1st	8½/12	+5−0=7	Ahead of Nimzowitsch (7), Spielmann (6½) and four other very strong players
1929	(United Kingdom) Ramsgate	1st	5½/7	+4−0=3	Ahead of Vera Menchik (5), Rubinstein (5), and four others
1929	(Czechoslovakia) Carlsbad	2nd=	14½/21	+10−2=9	Behind Nimzowitsch (15); tied with Spielmann; ahead of Rubinstein (13½) and 18 others, mostly very strong
1929	(Hungary) Budapest	1st	10½/13	+8−0=5	Ahead of Rubinstein (9½), Savielly Tartakower (8) and 11 others
1929	(Spain) Barcelona	1st	13½/14	+13−0=1	Ahead of Tartakower (11½) and 13 others
1929–30	(United Kingdom) Hastings	1st	6½/9	+4-0=5	
1930–31	(United Kingdom) Hastings	2nd	6½/9	+5−1=3	Behind Euwe (7); ahead of eight others
1931	(United States) New York	1st	10/11	+9−0=2	Ahead of Isaac Kashdan (8½) and 10 others
1934–35	(United Kingdom) Hastings	4th	5½/9	+4−2=3	Behind Thomas (6½), Euwe (6½) and Salo Flohr (6½); ahead of Mikhail Botvinnik (5), Andor Lilienthal (5) and four others
1935	(Soviet Union) Moscow	4th	12/19	+7−2=10	Behind Botvinnik (13), Flohr (13) and Lasker (12½); ahead of Spielmann (11) and 15 others, mainly Soviet players
1935	(United Kingdom) Margate	2nd	7/9	+6−1=2	Behind Samuel Reshevsky (7½); ahead of eight others.
1936	(United Kingdom) Margate	2nd	7/9	+5−0=4	Behind Flohr (7½); ahead of Gideon Ståhlberg and eight others.
1936	(Soviet Union) Moscow	1st	13/18	+8−0=10	Ahead of Botvinnik (12), Flohr (9½), Lilienthal (9), Viacheslav Ragozin (8½), Lasker (8) and four others
1936	(United Kingdom) Nottingham	1st=	10/14	+7−1=6	Tied with Botvinnik; ahead of Euwe (9½), Reuben Fine (9½), Reshevsky (9½), Alekhine (9), Flohr (8½), Lasker (8½) and seven other strong opponents
1937	(Austria) Semmering	3rd=	7½/14	+2−1=11	Behind Paul Keres (9), Fine (8); tied with Reshevsky; ahead of Flohr (7), Erich Eliskases (6), Ragozin (6) and Vladimirs Petrovs (5)
1938	(France) Paris	1st=	8/10	+6−0=4	Ahead of Nicolas Rossolimo (7½) and four others
1938	AVRO tournament, at ten cities in the Netherlands	7th	6/14	+2-4=8	Behind Keres (8½), Fine (8½), Botvinnik (7½), Alekhine (7), Euwe (7) and Reshevsky (7); ahead of Flohr (4½)
1939	(United Kingdom) Margate	2nd=	6½/9	+4−0=5	Behind Keres (7½); tied with Flohr; ahead of seven others

At the 1939 Chess Olympiad in Buenos Aires, Capablanca took the medal for best performance on a country's first board.

== Match results ==
Here are Capablanca's results in matches. The first "Score" column gives the number of points on the total possible. In the second "Score" column, "+" indicates the number of won games, "−" the number of losses, and "=" the number of draws.

Date	Opponent	Result	Location	Score		Notes
1901	Juan Corzo	Won	Havana	7–6	+4−3=6	Corzo was the reigning champion of Cuba.
1909	Frank James Marshall	Won	New York	15–8	+8−1=14	
1912	Charles Jaffe	Won	New York	2½–½	+2−0=1	
1912	Oscar Chajes	Won	New York	1–0	+1−0=0	
1913	Richard Teichmann	Won	Berlin	2–0	+2−0=0	
1913	Jacques Mieses	Won	Berlin	2–0	+2−0=0	
1913	Eugene Znosko-Borovsky	Drawn	St. Petersburg	1–1	+1−1=0	The three matches against Russian masters were played for stakes. Besides the stake-money there was a gold cup to be awarded for the series, either to Capablanca if he won all his games, or to the player who made the best score against him. The cup went to Znosko-Borovsky.
1913	Alexander Alekhine	Won	St. Petersburg	2–0	+2−0=0	The three matches against Russian masters were played for stakes. Besides the stake-money there was a gold cup to be awarded for the series, either to Capablanca if he won all his games, or to the player who made the best score against him. The cup went to Znosko-Borovsky.
1913	Fedor Duz-Khotimirsky	Won	St. Petersburg	2–0	+2−0=0	The three matches against Russian masters were played for stakes. Besides the stake-money there was a gold cup to be awarded for the series, either to Capablanca if he won all his games, or to the player who made the best score against him. The cup went to Znosko-Borovsky.
1914	Ossip Bernstein	Won	Moscow	1½–½	+1−0=1	
1914	Savielly Tartakower	Won	Vienna	1½–½	+1−0=1	
1914	Arnold Aurbach	Won	Paris	2–0	+2−0=0	
1919	Boris Kostić	Won	Havana	5–0	+5−0=0	
1921	Emanuel Lasker	Won	Havana	9–5	+4−0=10	Won World Chess Championship.
1927	Alexander Alekhine	Lost	Buenos Aires	15½–18½	+3−6=25	Lost World Chess Championship.
1931	Max Euwe	Won	Netherlands	6–4	+2−0=8	Euwe became World Champion 1935–1937.

== Notable games ==
- Capablanca vs. L Molina, Buenos Aires 1911, Queen's Gambit Declined: Modern. Knight Defense (D52), 1–0 This game features a Greek gift sacrifice.
- Jose Raul Capablanca vs Frank James Marshall, ch Manhattan CC, New York 1918, Spanish Game: Marshall Attack. Original Marshall Attack (C89), 1–0 One of the most famous games of Capablanca. That Marshall unveiled this attack after having kept it secret for years is a myth. Capablanca defends against an extremely aggressive attack.
- Jose Raul Capablanca vs Professor Marc Fonaroff, New York 1918, Spanish Game: Berlin Defense. Hedgehog Variation (C62), 1–0 Capablanca wins quickly with some precise play.
- Emanuel Lasker vs Jose Raul Capablanca, Lasker–Capablanca World Championship Match, Havana 1921. Queen's Gambit Declined: Orthodox Defense. Rubinstein Variation (D61), 0–1
- Jose Raul Capablanca vs Savielly Tartakower, New York 1924, Dutch Defense, Horwitz Variation: General (A80), 1–0 This game concludes with one of the most revered endgames in chess history.
- Jose Raul Capablanca vs Rudolf Spielmann, New York 1927, Queen's Gambit Declined: Barmen Variation (D37), 1–0 A tactical game that earned the brilliancy prize for Capablanca.
- Jose Raul Capablanca vs Andor Lilienthal, Moscow 1936, Reti Opening: Anglo-Slav. Bogoljubow Variation (A12), 1–0 Pawn play utilizing space against material advantage.
- Ilia Abramovich Kan vs Jose Raul Capablanca, Moscow 1936, Vienna Game: Anderssen Defense (C25), 0–1 This game contains one of Capablanca's most famous endgames.

== See also ==
- Botvinnik versus Capablanca, AVRO 1938
- Chess Fever – a 1925 film starring Capablanca
- List of covers of Time magazine (1920s) – 7 December 1925
- Capablanca Memorial

Awards and achievements
Preceded by Emanuel Lasker	World Chess Champion; 1921–27	Succeeded by Alexander Alekhine
