= Botvinnik versus Capablanca, AVRO 1938 =

Animation of the game

On 22 November 1938, Mikhail Botvinnik (as White) defeated José Raúl Capablanca (as Black) in one of the most famous games in chess history. The game was played in round 11 of the AVRO tournament in Rotterdam. Capablanca was a former world chess champion (1921–1927), while Botvinnik would later become world champion himself (1948–1957).

The game was widely praised, including by Garry Kasparov who said:

[...] Botvinnik played what was altogether the "game of his life" against Capablanca. It was not just that it was judged the most brilliant in the tournament and to be worth two first prizes, but it was even suggested that, by analogy with the "immortal" and "evergreen" games, it should be called "peerless" or "classical"!

This was the last game between the two before Capablanca's death in 1942; he was suffering poor health during the tournament. Botvinnik and Capablanca had previously played seven other games of competitive tournament chess, including another game with the opposite colours at the same tournament a few days prior, which was drawn. In 1925, Botvinnik (then aged 14) had beaten Capablanca in an exhibition simultaneous game.

== The game ==
White: Mikhail Botvinnik Black: José Capablanca Tournament: AVRO, Netherlands 1938 Opening: Nimzo-Indian Defense (ECO E40)

1. d4 Nf6 2. c4 e6 3. Nc3 Bb4 4. e3 d5 5. a3 Bxc3+ 6. bxc3

White gets doubled pawns but they quickly get undoubled.

6... c5 7. cxd5 exd5 8. Bd3 0-0 9. Ne2 b6 10. 0-0 Ba6 11. Bxa6 Nxa6 12. Bb2 Qd7 13. a4 Rfe8 14. Qd3 c4

After the game, Botvinnik suggested 14...Qb7 as an alternative here.

15. Qc2 Nb8 16. Rae1 Nc6 17. Ng3 Na5? 18. f3

White prepares to make use of his central pawn majority in order to gain space, and, later on, to attack Black's king. Black's knight moves to an outpost on the b3-square, but it proves unable to defend against White's advances.

Position: a7 black pawn, e7 black queen, g7 black king, h7 black pawn, b6 black pawn, e6 white pawn, f6 black knight, g6 black pawn, d5 black pawn, e5 white queen, c4 black pawn, d4 white pawn, b3 black knight, c3 white pawn, g3 white knight, b2 white bishop, g2 white pawn, h2 white pawn, g1 white king

Position after 29...Qe7?, and before Botvinnik's famous 30.Ba3!

18... Nb3 19. e4 Qxa4 20. e5 Nd7 21. Qf2 g6 22. f4 f5 23. exf6 e.p. Nxf6 24. f5 Rxe1 25. Rxe1 Re8? 26. Re6 Rxe6 27. fxe6 Kg7 28. Qf4 Qe8 29. Qe5? Qe7? (see diagram)

According to Graham Burgess, Black's best try was 29...h6! 30.h4! (30.Ne2!? might draw) 30...Na5! 31.Bc1! Qe7 32.Bg5! with winning chances for White; however, the move played leads to a tactical combination that wins instantly.

30. Ba3!

White draws Black's queen away from blockading the passed pawn.

30... Qxa3

Black has no choice because otherwise White's passed pawn advances (31.e7).

31. Nh5+!

This sacrifice of the knight must be accepted because of the fork of Black's knight and king. Black's knight cannot take White's, however, due to the pin on it by White's queen. White regains the knight by a queen fork next move.

31... gxh5 32. Qg5+ Kf8 33. Qxf6+ Kg8 34. e7 Qc1+ 35. Kf2 Qc2+ 36. Kg3 Qd3+ 37. Kh4 Qe4+ 38. Kxh5 Qe2+ 39. Kh4 Qe4+ 40. g4 Qe1+ 41. Kh5

Black is out of useful checks and is faced with the threat of mate with Qf8#. If 41...h6, then White promotes the pawn after 42.Qg6+ Kh8 43.e8=Q+, mating after 43...Qxe8 44.Qxe8+ Kg7 45.Qe7+ followed by 46.Kxh6 and 47.Qg7#.

1–0

Black resigned.

== See also ==
- List of chess games
- Passed pawn
