= AVRO 1938 chess tournament =

Chess tournament in the Netherlands

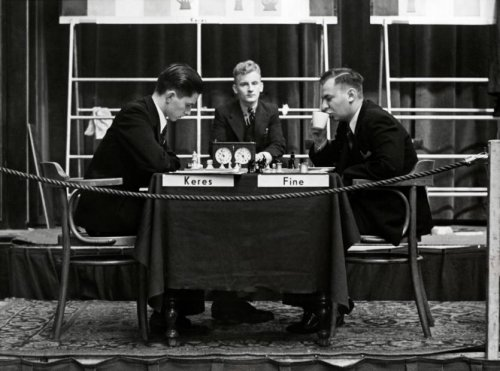
Final round game Paul Keres vs. Reuben Fine

The AVRO tournament was a famous chess tournament held in the Netherlands in 1938, sponsored by the Dutch broadcasting company AVRO. The event was a double round-robin tournament between the eight strongest players in the world.

According to the unofficial Chessmetrics ratings, the tournament was (as of March 2005) one of only six tournaments in history that had the top eight players in the world playing, and the only one to have only the top eight players playing.

Paul Keres and Reuben Fine tied for first place, with Keres winning on tiebreak by virtue of his 1½-½ score in their individual games.

The tournament was presented as one to provide a challenger to World Champion Alexander Alekhine, though it had no official status. In any event, World War II dashed any hopes of a championship match for years to come. However, when FIDE organised its 1948 match tournament for the world title after Alekhine's death in 1946, it invited the six surviving AVRO participants (Capablanca had also died), except Flohr who was replaced by Vasily Smyslov.

== Schedule ==
The AVRO tournament was played from November 6 to November 27, 1938. The players travelled from one city to another in the following order:

Round	Place	Date
1	Amsterdam	Nov. 6
2	The Hague	Nov. 8
3	Rotterdam	Nov. 10
4	Groningen	Nov. 12
5	Zwolle	Nov. 13
6	Haarlem	Nov. 14
7	Amsterdam	Nov. 15
8	Utrecht	Nov. 17
9	Arnhem	Nov. 19
10	Breda	Nov. 20
11	Rotterdam	Nov. 22
12	The Hague	Nov. 24
13	Leiden	Nov. 25
14	Amsterdam	Nov. 27

== Crosstable ==
No.	Name	State	Keres		Fine		Botv.		Euwe		Resh.		Alekh.		Capa.		Flohr		Total
1	Paul Keres	Estonia			1	½	½	½	½	½	1	½	½	½	1	½	½	½	8½
2	Reuben Fine	United States	0	½			1	½	1	0	1	0	1	1	½	½	1	½	8½
3	Mikhail Botvinnik	Soviet Union	½	½	0	½			½	0	1	½	1	½	½	1	½	½	7½
4	Max Euwe	Netherlands	½	½	0	1	½	1			0	½	0	½	0	1	1	½	7
5	Samuel Reshevsky	United States	0	½	0	1	0	½	1	½			½	½	½	½	1	½	7
6	Alexander Alekhine	France	½	½	0	0	0	½	1	½	½	½			½	1	½	1	7
7	José Raúl Capablanca	Cuba	0	½	½	½	½	0	1	0	½	½	½	0			½	1	6
8	Salo Flohr	Czechoslovakia	½	½	0	½	½	½	0	½	0	½	½	0	½	0			4½

The longest game was a 68-move win of Fine over Alekhine. The shortest game was a 19-move draw between Flohr and Fine. Of the 56 games played: White won seventeen, Black won seven, and thirty-two were drawn.

The tournament was supposed to select a challenger to Alekhine's crown, but due to the advent of World War II, no match could be held. GM Larry Kaufman wrote in 2023 that Fine "was a clear favorite" had he played against Alekhine in 1939 or 1940, whereas for Keres "it's not so clear whether he would have defeated Alekhine in 1940" (as Keres' peak play was in the 1950s).

== Capablanca's health ==
Capablanca's play was satisfactory in the first half of the event (50%), but collapsed in the second half, when he lost three games. He had only lost 26 tournament games in 29 years. Hooper and Whyld say "he suffered a slight stroke". His wife Olga recalled that his high blood pressure nearly cost him his life: "A doctor screamed at me, 'How could you let him play?'" (at AVRO 1938). In a 1939 interview Capablanca attributed his performance to "very high blood pressure and related circulatory disorders". His doctor wrote that he had dangerously high blood pressure while he was treating him from 1940 until his death in 1942, and believed that it contributed to his death. The Cuban had been suffering from angina pectoris going into the tournament and it was the only tournament during his life in which he lost more games than he won.

== See also ==
- Botvinnik versus Capablanca, AVRO 1938, a famous game from the 11th round.
- Nottingham 1936 chess tournament
- World chess championship

== Sources ==
- АВРО-турнир: Состязание сильнейших гроссмейстеров мира. Голландия, 1938 год / [Авт.-сост. Г. Г. Торадзе]. Москва: Галерия, 2006. 295 с ISBN 5-8137-0159-1.
