= World Chess Championship 1929 =

	Defending champion	Challenger
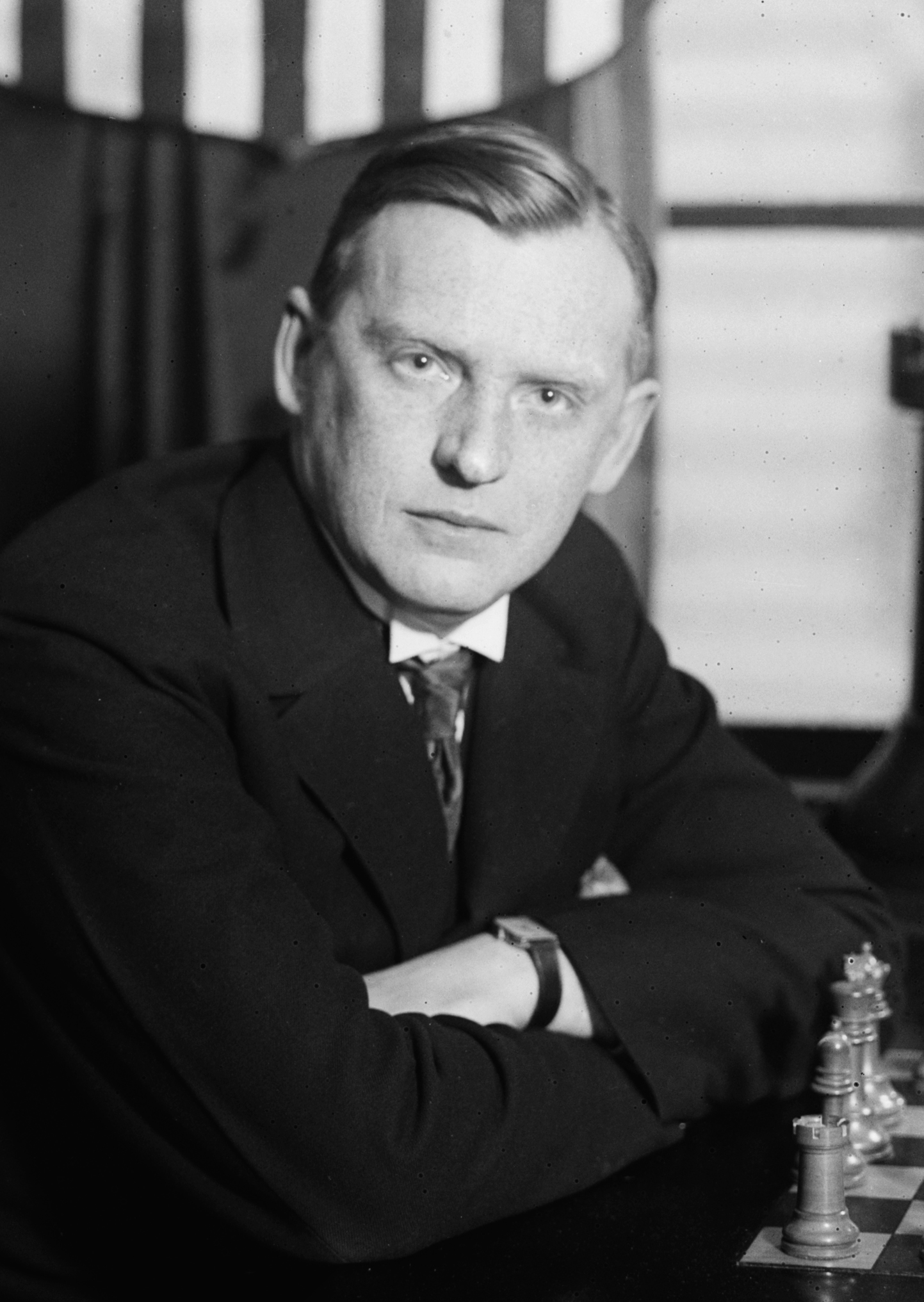
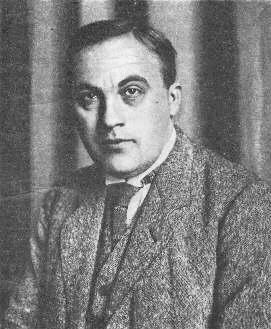
	Alexander Alekhine	Efim Bogoljubow
	(French Third Republic) Alexander Alekhine	(Weimar Republic) Efim Bogoljubov
15½	Scores	9½
	Born 31 October 1892; 36/37 years old	Born 26 April 1889; 40 years old

In 1929, a World Chess Championship was played between challenger Efim Bogoljubow and titleholder Alexander Alekhine. The match was held in Wiesbaden, Heidelberg and Berlin in Germany, and the Hague, Rotterdam and Amsterdam in the Netherlands, from September 6 to November 12. Alekhine retained his title.

== Background ==
Alekhine had been world champion since his 1927 victory over José Raúl Capablanca.

In 1928, Bogoljubov won a major tournament at Bad Kissingen, ahead of Capablanca and most other leading players of the day except for Alekhine. Following this win, he challenged Alekhine for the world title. There was also an alternative offer of a return match against Capablanca in Bradley Beach, New Jersey, U.S.

Under the rules at the time, the champion chose the challenger, and Alekhine chose to play a match against Bogoljubov.

== Results ==
The first player to win six games and score more than 15 points would be champion.

World Chess Championship Match 1929
	1	2	3	4	5	6	7	8	9	10	11	12	13	14	15	16	17	18	19	20	21	22	23	24	25	Wins	Points
Alexander Alekhine (France)	1	½	½	0	1	0	1	1	½	1	½	1	0	0	½	1	1	0	1	½	1	1	½	½	½	11	15½
Efim Bogoljubow (Germany)	0	½	½	1	0	1	0	0	½	0	½	0	1	1	½	0	0	1	0	½	0	0	½	½	½	5	9½

== Games ==
=== Game 1: Alekhine–Bogoljubow, 1–0 ===
September 6.

Slav Defense, Soultanbéieff Variation (ECO D16)
1.d4 d5 2.c4 c6 3.Nf3 Nf6 4.Nc3 dxc4 5.a4 e6 6.e4 Bb4 7.e5 Nd5 8.Bd2 Bxc3 9.bxc3 b5 10.Ng5 f6 11.exf6 Nxf6 12.Be2 a6 13.Bf3 h6 14.Bh5+ Nxh5+ 15.Qxh5+ Kd7 16.Nf7 Qe8 17.Qg6 Rg8 18.Bf4 Bb7 19.Bg3 Ke7 20.Bd6+ Kd7 21.0-0 c5 22.dxc5 Bd5 23.axb5 axb5 24.Rxa8 Bxa8 25.Ra1 Nc6 26.Ne5+ 1–0

=== Game 2: Bogoljubow–Alekhine, ½–½ ===
September 7.

Nimzo-Indian Defense, Spielmann Variation, Romanovsky Gambit (ECO E23)
1.d4 Nf6 2.c4 e6 3.Nc3 Bb4 4.Qb3 c5 5.dxc5 Nc6 6.Nf3 Bxc5 7.Bg5 h6 8.Bxf6 Qxf6 9.e3 b6 10.Be2 Bb7 11.Ne4 Qe7 12.0-0 0-0 13.Rad1 Rfd8 14.a3 Rac8 15.Qc2 d5 16.cxd5 exd5 17.Nxc5 bxc5 18.Rfe1 d4 19.Bd3 dxe3 20.Rxe3 Qf6 21.Rde1 Nd4 22.Nxd4 cxd4 23.R3e2 g6 24.Qd2 Ba6 25.Bxa6 Qxa6 26.Qxh6 d3 27.Rd2 Re8 28.Red1 Rc2 29.h3 Qf6 30.Kh1 Rxb2 31.f3 Rxd2 32.Qxd2 Qd4 33.Qb4 Qf2 34.Kh2 Re2 35.Qb8+ Kg7 36.Qg3 Qd4 37.Qg4 Qe3 38.Qg3 d2 39.f4 Qe4 40.f5 Kh6 41.fxg6 fxg6 42.h4 Qd5 43.Qg4 Qe5+ 44.Qg3 Qd5 45.Qg4 Re4 46.Qg5+ Qxg5 47.hxg5+ Kxg5 48.Rxd2 Ra4 49.Rd3 Kf4 50.Rh3 g5 51.Rb3 ½–½

The eighth game of this series was the only game in the history of the world chess championships to end in an actual checkmate, instead of resigning before the checkmate is played out.
