= World Chess Championship 1927 =

	Defending champion	Challenger
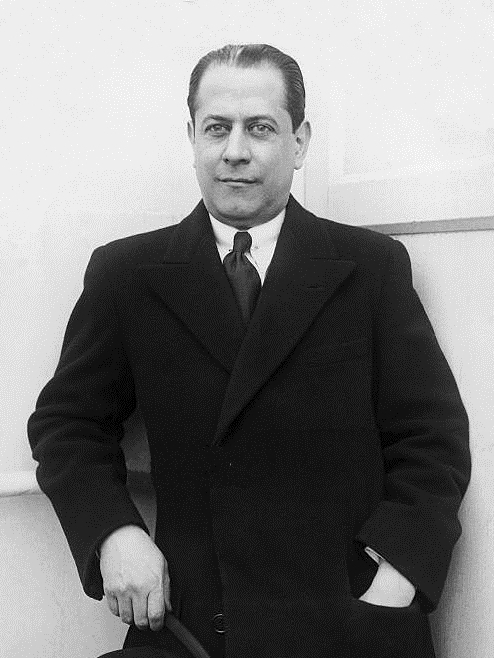
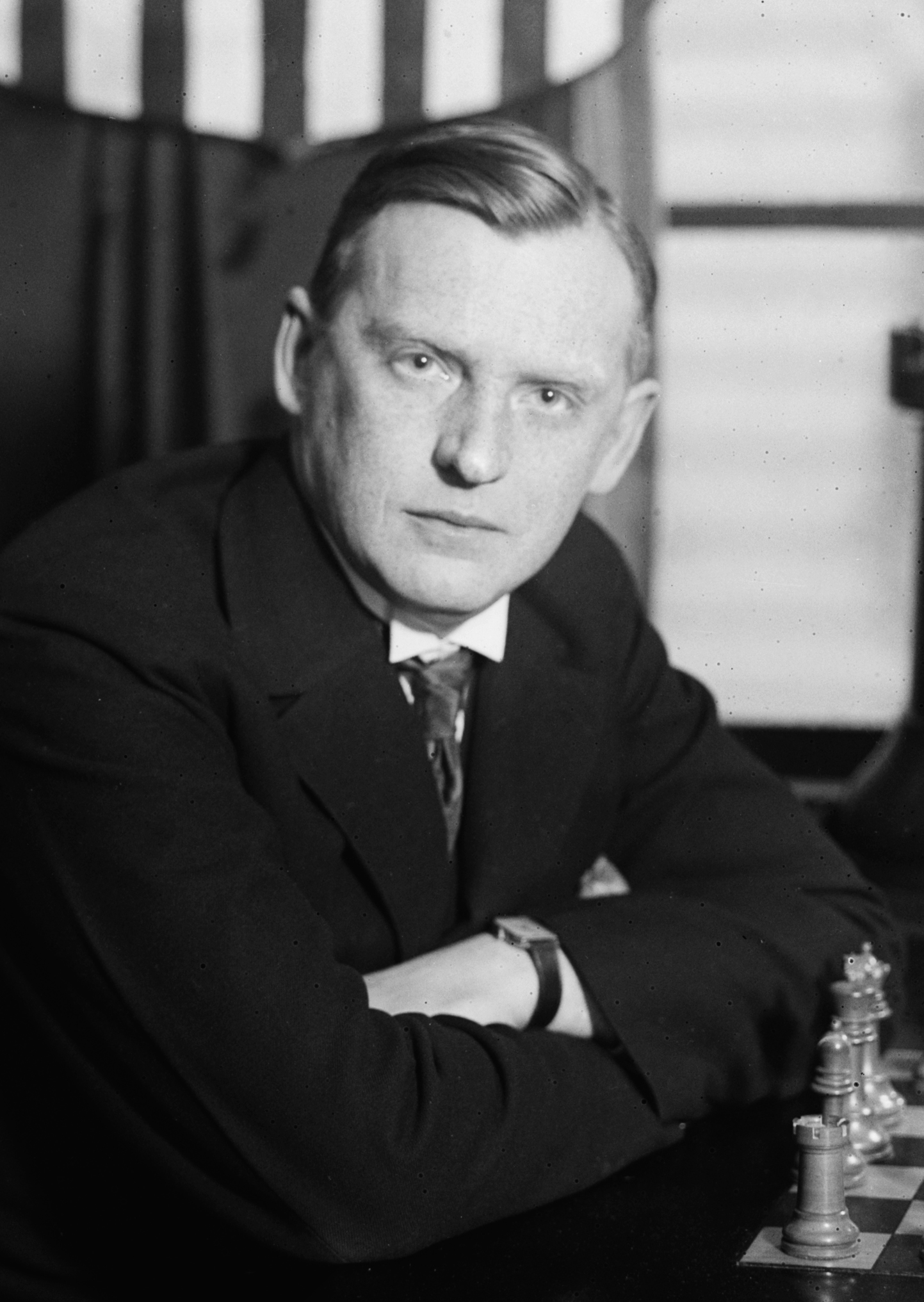
	Jose Raul Capablanca	Alexander Alekhine
	(Cuba) José Raúl Capablanca	(French Third Republic) Alexander Alekhine
3	Scores	6
	Born 19 November 1888; 38/39 years old	Born 31 October 1892; 34/35 years old

The 1927 World Chess Championship was played between José Raúl Capablanca and Alexander Alekhine, in Buenos Aires from September 16 to November 29, 1927. Alekhine, a Russian, became a naturalised French citizen during the match (on November 5).

According to the London rules of 1922 proposed by Capablanca, the challenger had to contribute $10,000 ($175,300 in 2023) to be able to challenge the champion. Alekhine was able to raise that money in 1927. Alekhine demanded that Capablanca fulfill this condition in order to play him in a rematch, but Capablanca was never able to come up with that money.

== Results ==
The first player to win six games would be World Champion. Some sources suggest the match would have been drawn and replayed if it reached a score of 5–5, but it is unclear whether this was the case.

World Chess Championship Match 1927
	1	2	3	4	5	6	7	8	9	10	11	12	13	14	15	16	17	18	19	20	21	22	23	24	25	26	27	28	29	30	31	32	33	34	Wins	Total
José Raúl Capablanca (Cuba)	0	=	1	=	=	=	1	=	=	=	0	0	=	=	=	=	=	=	=	=	0	=	=	=	=	=	=	=	1	=	=	0	=	0	3	15½
Alexander Alekhine (France)	1	=	0	=	=	=	0	=	=	=	1	1	=	=	=	=	=	=	=	=	1	=	=	=	=	=	=	=	0	=	=	1	=	1	6	18½

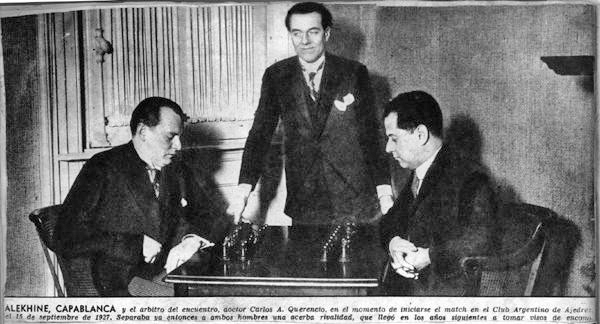
Alekhine vs. Capablanca

Alekhine won the Championship, scoring +6−3=25.
