= Anthony Santasiere =

American chess player (1904–1977)

Personal information
- Born: Anthony Edward Santasiere; December 9, 1904 New York City, U.S.
- Died: January 13, 1977 (aged 72) Hollywood, Florida, U.S.

Chess career
- Country: United States

Anthony Edward Santasiere (December 9, 1904 – January 13, 1977) was an American chess master and chess writer, who also wrote extensively on non-chess topics. Santasiere was a middle school mathematics teacher by profession. Santasiere won the 1945 U.S. Open Chess Championship, four New York State championships, and six Marshall Chess Club championships. He competed in four U.S. Chess Championships, with his best finish being a tie for third in 1946. He was a chess organizer.

== Early life, education, professional career ==
Santasiere, of French and Italian ancestry, was born and raised in New York City, the 12th of 13 children, and grew up in extreme poverty. He graduated from City College with a degree in mathematics. His studies there were financed by Alrick Man, a wealthy chess enthusiast who had served as president of the Marshall Chess Club. Santasiere represented CCNY in intercollegiate chess. Following graduation, beginning in 1927, Santasiere taught mathematics at the Angelo Patri Middle School in the Bronx. He also taught mathematics and home room at P.S. 92 in the Bronx. He retired to South Florida in 1965.

== Chess career ==
Santasiere wrote extensively on chess in the magazine American Chess Bulletin, from 1930 to 1963; he served as Games Editor, working with Editor Hermann Helms. The chess opening Santasiere's Folly (1.Nf3 d5 2.b4), was originated and developed by him, and is named for him. Santasiere was also an expert in the Reti Opening, the King's Gambit, and the Vienna Game.

=== Metropolitan competitor ===
In the 1930s, Santasiere defeated Albert Simonson by (+3 -1) in a match, and also defeated Fred Reinfeld in match play by (+3 =3 -0). Santasiere competed in 34 consecutive Marshall Chess Club Championships, and represented the Marshall Club for 37 consecutive seasons in the Metropolitan Chess League.

=== 1920s ===
In 1922, at age 17, Santasiere won the first of his six Marshall Chess Club Championships. In 1923, Santasiere tied for 13th/14th place at Lake Hopatcong (9th American Chess Congress, Frank Marshall and Abraham Kupchik won). In 1924, he took third place, behind Marshall and Carlos Torre, at New York. In 1927, he tied for third/fourth at New York (Albert Pinkus won). In 1927, he tied for fourth through sixth place at Rome, New York (New York State Championship; Rudolph Smirka won). In 1928, Santasiere won at Buffalo (New York State Championship). In 1929, he took third place, behind Herman Steiner and Jacob Bernstein, at Buffalo (New York State Championship).

=== 1930s ===
In 1930, he tied for first with Norman Lessing at Utica (New York State Championship). In 1931, he took seventh place in New York (José Raúl Capablanca won). In 1931, he tied for third/fourth at Rome (New York State Championship; Fred Reinfeld won). In 1934, he tied for ninth/tenth at Syracuse (Samuel Reshevsky won). In 1935, he took seventh at Milwaukee (U.S. Open); (Reuben Fine won). In 1938, he tied for 10th/11th at New York (second US Championship; Reshevsky won). In 1938, he took fifth at Boston (U.S. Open); (Israel Horowitz and Isaac Kashdan won).

=== 1940s ===
He shared first place with George Shainswit at Ventnor City 1943. He took second place, behind Reshevsky, at Boston 1944 (the 45th US Open). He won at Peoria 1945 (the 46th US Open). In September 1945, he played in a US vs USSR radio match on tenth board against David Bronstein, and lost both games. In 1946, he tied for third place in the U.S. Chess Championship, New York City, behind only Samuel Reshevsky and Isaac Kashdan. In 1946, he won the New York State Championship for the third time. In 1946, he drew a four-game match with Herbert Seidman; one win each, two draws. In 1949, he took second, behind Sandrin, at Omaha (US Open).

=== 1950s ===
He won a tournament at Milan, Italy in 1953. In 1956, he won the New York State Championship for the fourth and final time. In 1957, Santasiere beat young Bobby Fischer, then age 14, in the West Orange, New Jersey Open; Fischer would win the first of his eight consecutive U.S. Championships a few months later.

=== 1960s ===
Santasiere tied for 9-13th places at the 1960 Canadian Open Chess Championship in Kitchener, with 6/10; Anthony Saidy won.

On Saturday, May 11, 1968, at the Miami Beach Chess Club in Miami Beach, Florida, Santasiere, billed as "The American Chess Champion", competed in a marathon simultaneous exhibition versus 21 opponents. Santasiere scored 12 victories (including a victory over Barry Moss), three draws, four defaults wins, and lost to Hank Bergman and Irving Lynch.

== Personal life, later years ==
He was an amateur painter, painting over 400 oil paintings, and a prolific poet and creative writer on non-chess topics. He played piano, and frequently hosted dinner parties. He organized many small-size Master events in his apartment in New York.

In 1965, he retired to south Florida, where he continued to play tournament chess for a while, and won several local tournaments. A gay man, he lived with a younger man, Hector; friend Arnold Denker recalls a loving but turbulent relationship between those two, characterizing them as "Felix and Oscar". On his death Santasiere left his estate to his partner.

== Chess books written by Santasiere ==
- The Futuristic Chess opening: Santasiere's Folly (Paperback) by Anthony Santasiere, Chess Digest Publishers, Dallas 1973
- The Romantic King’s Gambit in Games and Analysis, by Anthony Santasiere, Chess Digest Publishers, Dallas 1992 (published posthumously)
- My Love Affair with Tchigorin, by Anthony Santasiere
- Essay on Chess, by Anthony Santasiere, Chess Digest Publishers, Dallas 1972
- Larsen-Santasiere Variation 2.P-KB4 Vs. The Sicilian Defense, Chess Digest Publishers, Dallas 1971

== Chess writing style ==
His chess writing style was flamboyant and highly opinionated; he would frequently criticize or even outright insult other chess players for their perceived lack of "spirituality". In response to a harsh review by Edward Winter of Santasiere's book Essay on Chess, Anthony Saidy wrote:

It is true that Santasiere wrote badly, wrote poetry that was embarrassing, had extreme views -– yet, carving out a niche as our most flamboyant contemporary romantic, he was unique. He was important as an antidote. My early Marshall C.C. games with him were among my most instructive. As late as the Canadian Open Chess Championship, 1960 (which I won with many uneasy moments), he was able to run up to me and exclaim about a pretty but simple knight sacrifice he’d just played, "I’ve just won the most beautiful game of my life". He really believed it at that moment. A true lover of chess – a type seldom found among top competitors today.

== Non-chess writing ==
Denker and Parr describe Santasiere's strong spiritual interests; he advocated what Henry Adams called "conservative Christian anarchy". During his life, Santasiere wrote three novels, 13 books of essays, 14 collections of short stories, and 30 volumes of a personal journal.

== Playing strength ==
Santasiere was among the top 15 U.S. players from the late 1920s into the mid-1950s. He never earned an international title in chess, and had minimal international competition. The website chessmetrics.com, which ranks chess performances on a retrospective basis, calculated a peak rank of No. 53 in the world for May 1931.
