= Sidney Norman Bernstein =

American chess player (1911–1992)

Sidney Norman Bernstein (13 July 1911, in New York City – 30 January 1992, in New York City) was an American chess master.

He tied for 2nd-4th in Marshall Chess Club Championship at New York 1930/31 (Arthur Dake won), tied for 6-7th in New York State Chess Championship at Rome 1931 (Fred Reinfeld won). He played board two, behind Reuben Fine, on the victorious CCNY team in the 1931-32 Intercollegiate championships. He took 11th in the American Chess Federation Congress (U.S. Open Chess Championship) at Philadelphia 1936 (Israel Albert Horowitz won).

Bernstein was a participant in eight U.S. Chess Championship events (1936, 1938, 1940, 1951, 1954, 1957, 1959 and 1961).

He played thrice in Ventnor City, as he shared 1st in 1940, tied for 5-7th (Jacob Levin won) in 1941, and tied for 3rd-6th (Daniel Yanofsky won) in 1942. He tied for 1st with Reinfeld in Manhattan Chess Club Championship at New York 1942, and took 8th in Manhattan CC in 1955 (Max Pavey won).

Top players that he scored wins against were Donald Byrne, multiple wins against Arnold Denker, multiple wins against Frank James Marshall, Edmar Mednis, and Sammy Reshevsky, amongst others.
