= Fred Reinfeld =

American chess writer and master (1910–1964)

Fred Reinfeld (January 27, 1910 – May 29, 1964) was an American writer on chess and many other subjects. He was also a strong chess master, often among the top ten American players from the early 1930s to the early 1940s, as well as a college chess instructor.

== Early life, family, and education ==
Fred Reinfeld was born in New York City, and lived his entire life within its metropolitan area. His father, Barnett Reinfeld, was of Polish-Jewish heritage, while his mother Rose (née Pogrezelsky) was of Romanian-Jewish heritage.

Reinfeld learned chess in his early teen years and played for his high school team. He joined the Marshall Chess Club in Manhattan in 1926. He became involved in correspondence chess while in high school.

Reinfeld attended New York University and the College of the City of New York, studying accounting. He won the U.S. Intercollegiate championship in 1929 while at NYU.

He married his fiancée Beatrice in 1932. They had two children: Donald, born in 1942, and Judith, born in 1947.

== Chess writing ==
Fred Reinfeld was a prolific author, having written or co-written well over 100 books.

Reinfeld began writing about chess in late 1932. His first book, co-authored with Isaac Kashdan, was an account of the Bled 1931 master tournament.

He became a charter writer for the new magazine Chess Review in 1933, and was a senior editor there by 1947.

More than half of his books were about chess, including books on the opening (Winning Chess Openings), the middlegame (1001 Winning Chess Sacrifices and Combinations), and game collections (Great Brilliancy Prize Games of the Chess Masters), as well as biographies of Alexander Alekhine, José Raúl Capablanca, Paul Keres, Emanuel Lasker (co-written with Reuben Fine), Paul Morphy (Andrew Soltis completed and published this book years after Reinfeld's death), and Aron Nimzowitsch.

Most of Reinfeld's chess books, such as The Complete Chess Player, were geared toward novice players. Many players received their first introduction to the game through his books. Reinfeld also wrote books for more advanced players, but they sold fewer copies. He certainly had the chess knowledge, research skills, and writing ability to write high-level books, but decided to specialize in basic books for chess beginners, since they sold much better, and he was able to make a living from this.

In 1996, Reinfeld became the 26th person inducted into the U.S. Chess Hall of Fame, and the first inducted primarily for his writing.

== Competitive chess ==
=== Playing strength ===
Although Reinfeld is remembered today mainly for his writing, he was also one of the strongest chess players in the United States from the early 1930s to the early 1940s, after which he withdrew from competition. He was ranked sixth in the country, with a rating of 2593, on the first rating list issued by the United States Chess Federation in 1950, after Reuben Fine, Samuel Reshevsky, Alexander Kevitz, Arthur Dake, and Albert Simonson. However, the next year's USCF rating list did not include Reinfeld, as he had withdrawn from competitive play.

=== Tournament highlights ===
Reinfeld twice won the New York State Championship, in 1931 and 1933. In 1933, he finished all eleven rounds undefeated, ahead of Fine, Anthony Santasiere, and Arnold Denker.

In 1932, he placed third at the Western Open in Minneapolis, behind only Fine and Reshevsky. He was invited to the very strong Pasadena International tournament and placed 7-10th; the winner was world champion Alexander Alekhine.

In the 1933 U.S. Olympic Team Qualification tournament, held in New York, he scored 4/10, tied 8-9th, and did not make the team; Fine, Dake and Simonson qualified. Reinfeld won the Marshall Chess Club title in 1934-35.

Reinfeld qualified twice for the finals of the U.S. Chess Championship. In 1938, he scored 6½/16, just below the middle, with Reshevsky winning. In 1940, Reinfeld scored 7½/16 for a similar placing, with Reshevsky once again the champion. In that era, only national championships of the Soviet Union featured stronger fields than the American national championship. At Ventnor City in 1939, he was second with 8/11; the champion was Milton Hanauer. At Ventnor City in 1941, he was again second with 6/9, behind only Jacob Levin. He tied for the title in the 1942 Manhattan Chess Club Championship with Sidney Norman Bernstein.

Reinfeld never competed internationally outside the United States. He withdrew from most tournament play after 1942, when his first child was born.

During his career, he won tournament games against grandmasters Reshevsky (twice), Fine, Frank Marshall, and Denker, and drew against world champion Alexander Alekhine.

== Non-chess writing ==
Reinfeld wrote his first book about a subject other than chess in 1948—an abridged version of Charles Dickens' famous work Oliver Twist.

Reinfeld also wrote books on a number of other subjects, including checkers (How to Win at Checkers), numismatics (Coin Collector's Handbook), philately (Commemorative Stamps of the U.S.A.), geology (Treasures of the Earth), history (Trappers of the West), medicine (Miracle Drugs and the New Age of Medicine), physics (Rays Visible and Invisible), political science (The Biggest Job in the World: The American Presidency), and jurisprudence (The Great Dissenters: Guardians of Their Country's Laws and Liberties). The latter book won the Thomas Alva Edison Foundation Award. In addition to his own name, Reinfeld wrote under the pseudonyms Robert V. Masters and Edward Young. Reinfeld's 19 numismatic works were the subject of an article by Leonard D. Augsberger in the November–December 2000 issue of Rare Coin Review.

== Professor and consultant ==
From the early 1930s, Reinfeld was a part-time chess instructor in the adult education departments at both New York University and Columbia University, where his courses were popular. He served as a consultant to the World Book Encyclopedia and the Random House College Dictionary. By the late 1940s, he was on the staff of NYU in the School of General Education.

== Death and library ==
On May 29, 1964, Reinfeld died at the age of 54 in East Meadow, New York, reportedly from a ruptured cerebral aneurysm. In 1965, his widow Beatrice Levine donated his library to New York University; it contained more than 1,000 books, of which he had written about 260.

== Biography ==
- "Fred Reinfeld", by Alex Dunne, 2019, McFarland & Company, Jefferson, North Carolina, ISBN 978-1-4766-7654-8.

== Notable games ==
- Reinfeld won against Reshevsky at the Western Championship in Minneapolis in 1932:
  1.d4 Nf6 2.c4 e6 3.Nf3 b6 4.g3 Bb7 5.Bg2 c5 6.d5 exd5 7.Nh4 g6 8.Nc3 h6 9.0-0 a6 10.cxd5 d6 11.e4 Bg7 12.f4 Nfd7 13.a4 0-0 14.Be3 Kh7 15.Qc2 Nf6 16.h3 Nbd7 17.Rae1 Re8 18.Bf2 Ng8 19.e5 dxe5 20.f5 Nf8 21.fxg6+ fxg6 22.Be4 Qd6 23.Be3 Ne7 24.Rf7 Kg8 25.Ref1 Nxd5 26.Rxb7 Nxe3 27.Qf2 Nf5 28.Nxf5 gxf5 29.Qxf5 Kh8 30.Rf7 Ng6 1–0
- Another win against Reshevsky in 1932, this time at Pasadena, and as Black:
  1.Nf3 Nf6 2.d4 g6 3.g3 Bg7 4.Bg2 0-0 5.0-0 d5 6.c4 c6 7.cxd5 cxd5 8.Nc3 Nc6 9.a3 Ne4 10.Be3 Nxc3 11.bxc3 Na5 12.Bf4 Bd7 13.Ne5 Bb5 14.Nd3 Rc8 15.a4 Ba6 16.Ra3 b6 17.Re1 Nc4 18.Ra2 Na5 19.Nb4 Bb7 20.Qd3 e6 21.h4 Rc4 22.Rb1 Qd7 23.Bd2 Rfc8 24.f4 h5 25.e4 dxe4 26.Bxe4 Rxc3 27.Bxc3 Rxc3 28.Qxc3 Bxd4+ 29.Kh2 Bxc3 30.Bxb7 Qxb7 31.Nd3 Qe4 0–1
- Reinfeld won against Marshall in New York City in 1941:
  1.d4 d5 2.c4 c6 3.Nf3 Nf6 4.cxd5 cxd5 5.Nc3 Nc6 6.Bf4 e6 7.e3 Bd6 8.Bxd6 Qxd6 9.Bd3 0-0 10.0-0 e5 11.Nb5 Qe7 12.dxe5 Nxe5 13.Be2 Nxf3+ 14.Bxf3 Be6 15.Qe2 Rfc8 16.Rfd1 Rc5 17.Rd4 Rac8 18.Nc3 Rc4 19.Rad1 Rxd4 20.Rxd4 h6 21.h3 Rc5 22.Qd3 Qc7 23.g4 g5 24.Kg2 Qe5 25.b4 Rc4 26.Nxd5 Bxd5 27.Rxd5 Rc3 28.Rxe5 Rxd3 29.Ra5 b6 30.Rxa7 Nd7 31.Ra6 Kg7 32.Bc6 Ne5 33.Rxb6 Rd2 34.a4 Nc4 35.Rb7 Nxe3+ 36.Kf3 Nd1 37.Rd7 Rxf2+ 38.Kg3 Rf1 39.a5 Nc3 40.a6 Ne2+ 41.Kg2 Ra1 42.a7 Nf4+ 43.Kf3 Ra3+ 44.Ke4 Nxh3 45.a8=Q Nf2+ 46.Kf5 1–0

== Books ==
=== Books on chess (118) ===
- 101 Chess Problems for Beginners (Wilshire, Hollywood, 1960) (ISBN 0-87980-017-8)
- 1001 Brilliant Chess Sacrifices and Combinations (Sterling, New York, 1955)
- 1001 Brilliant Ways to Checkmate (Wilshire Books, Hollywood, 1955) (ISBN 0-87980-110-7)
- 1001 Chess Sacrifices and Combinations (Barnes & Noble, New York, 1959) (ISBN 0-87980-111-5)
- 1001 Ways to Checkmate (Sterling, New York, 1955)
- A Chess Primer (Dolphin Books, Garden City, 1962)
- A New Approach to Chess Mastery (Hanover House, Garden City, 1959)
- A Treasury of British Chess Masterpieces (Chatto & Windus, London, 1950)
- A. Alekhine vs. E.D. Bogoljubow : World's Chess Championship 1934 (McKay, Philadelphia, 1934)
- An Expert's Guide to Chess Strategy (Hollywood, 1976)
- Art of Chess (edited by Reinfeld; written by Mason) (1958) (ISBN 0-486-20463-4)
- Art of Sacrifice in Chess (ISBN 0-486-28449-2)
- Attack and Counterattack In Chess (Barnes & Noble, New York, 1958)
- Beginner's Guide to Winning Chess (ISBN 0-87980-215-4)
- Book of the 1935 Margate Tournament
- Book of the 1935 Warsaw International Chess Team Tournament
- Book of the 1936-37 Hastings Tournament
- Botvinnik the Invincible (ISBN 4-87187-517-2)
- Botvinnik's Best Games, 1927–1934
- British Chess Masters: Past and Present (ISBN 4-87187-734-5)
- Challenge to Chessplayers (McKay, Philadelphia, 1947)
- Chess At-A-Glance by Edward Young (Ottenheimer, Baltimore, 1955)
- Chess By Yourself (McKay, Philadelphia, 1946) (ISBN 4-87187-736-1)
- Chess Combinations and Traps
- Chess for Amateurs: How To Improve Your Game (McKay, Philadelphia, 1942) (ISBN 4-87187-739-6)
- Chess for Children, with Moves and Positions Pictured in Photo and Diagram (ISBN 0-8069-4905-8)
- Chess for Young People
- Chess: How to play the Queen Pawn Openings (W Foulsham & Co, London, undated)
- Chess In A Nutshell (Permabooks, New York, 1958) (ISBN 0-671-64391-6)
- Chess is an Easy Game
- Chess Mastery by Question and Answer (McKay, Philadelphia, 1939) (ISBN 4-87187-732-9)
- Chess Quiz (McKay, Philadelphia, 1945) (ISBN 4-87187-738-8)
- Chess Secrets Revealed (Wilshire, Hollywood, 1959)
- Chess Strategy and Tactics: Fifty Master Games (Black Knight, New York, 1933)
- Chess Strategy for Offense and Defense (Barnes & Noble, New York, 1955)
- Chess Tactics for Beginners (ISBN 0-87980-019-4)
- Chess Traps, Pitfalls, and Swindles (ISBN 0-671-21041-6)
- Chess Victory Move By Move
- Chess: Attack and Counterattack (Sterling, New York, 1955)
- Chess: Win in 20 Moves or Less (Crowell, New York, 1962)
- Complete Chess Course (ISBN 0-385-00464-8)
- Complete Chess Player (ISBN 0-671-76895-6)
- Colle's Chess Masterpieces (Black Knight Press, New York, 1936; Dover Publications, Mineola, NY 1984, ISBN 0-486-24757-0)
- Complete Book of Chess Openings (Sterling, New York, 1957)
- Complete Book of Chess Stratagems (Sterling, New York, 1958)
- Creative Chess (Sterling, New York, 1959)
- Development of a Chess Genius, 100 Instructive Games of Alekhine (Dover)
- Dr. Lasker's Chess Career, Part I, 1889--1914 (Printingcraft, London, 1935) (ISBN 4-87187-531-8)
- E. S. Lowe's Chess In 30 Minutes (E.S. Lowe Co, New York, 1955)
- Epic Battles of the Chessboard (ISBN 0-486-29355-6) (Editor in collaboration with Israel Albert Horowitz, the author was Richard Nevil Coles)
- Fifty-one Brilliant Chess Masterpieces (Capitol Pub, New York, 1950)
- Games of the 1938 Washington State Chess Association Championship (1938)
- Great Brilliancy Prize Games of the Chess Masters (Collier, New York, 1961)(ISBN 0-486-28614-2)
- Great Games By Chess Prodigies (Macmillan, New York, 1967)
- Great Moments In Chess (Doubleday, New York, 1963)
- Great Short Games of the Chess Masters (Collier, New York, 1961)(ISBN 0-486-29266-5)
- How Do You Play Chess?
- How Not to Play Chess (Edited by Reinfeld; authored by Znosko-Borovsky) (ISBN 0-486-20920-2)
- How To Be A Winner at Chess (Hanover, Garden City, 1954)(ISBN 0-449-91206-X)
- How To Beat Your Opponent Quickly (Sterling, New York, 1956)
- How To Force Checkmate (Dover, New York, 1958) (ISBN 0-486-20439-1)
- How To Get More Out of Chess (Hanover, Garden City, 1957)
- How To Improve Your Chess (with Horowitz) (Collier, New York, 1952)
- How To Play Better Chess (Pitman, New York, 1948)
- How To Play Chess Like A Champion (Hanover, Garden City, 1956)
- How To Play Winning Chess (Bantam Books, New York, 1962)
- How to Think Ahead in Chess (with Horowitz)
- How To Win Chess Games Quickly (Barnes & Noble, New York, 1957)
- Hypermodern Chess: As Developed in the Games of its Greatest Exponent Aron Nimzovich (Dover, New York, 1948)(ISBN 0-486-20448-0)
- Improving Your Chess: The Nine Bad Moves and How to Avoid Them (Faber, London, 1954)
- Improving Your Chess (Sterling, New York, 1955) excerpted from the Second, Third, Forth and Fifth Book of Chess, plus 1001 Brilliant Chess Sacrifices and Combinations all by Fred Reinfeld
- Instructive and Practical Endings From Master Chess
- Kemeri Tournament, 1937
- Keres' Best Games of Chess (1941) (ISBN 4-87187-548-2)
- Keres' Best Games of Chess, 1931–1948 (Printed Arts Co., 1949)
- Lasker's Greatest Chess Games, 1889–1914 (Dover, New York, 1963)
- Learn Chess Fast! (with Reshevsky) (McKay, Philadelphia, 1947)
- Learn Chess From the Masters (Dover, New York, 1946)
- Modern Fundamentals of Chess
- Morphy Chess Masterpieces (with Soltis) (Macmillan, New York, 1974)
- Morphy's Games of Chess (by Sergeant; edited by Reinfeld) (ISBN 0-486-20386-7)
- My System: A Treatise on Chess (by Nimzovich; edited by Reinfeld) (McKay, Philadelphia, 1947)
- Nimzovich: The Hypermodern (McKay, Philadelphia, 1948) (ISBN 4-87187-733-7)
- Practical End-game Play (Pitman, London, 1940)
- Reinfeld Explains Chess (Sterling, New York, 1957)
- Reinfeld On The End-Game in Chess (Dover, New York, 1957)
- Relax With Chess and Win In 20 Moves (Pitman, New York, 1948)
- Semmering-Baden Tournament of 1937
- Strategy in the Chess Endgame
- Tarrasch's Best Games of Chess (Chatto & Windus, London 1947)
- The Book of the Cambridge Springs International Tournament 1904 (Black Knight Press, 1935)
- The Chess Masters On Winning Chess (Hanover House, 1960)
- The Complete Book of Chess Tactics (Doubleday, Garden City, 1961)
- The Complete Chess Course (Doubleday, Garden City, 1959)
- The Complete Chessplayer (Prentice Hall, Englewood Cliffs, New Jersey, 1953)
- The Complete Chessplayer by Edward Young (New English Library, London, 1960)
- The Great Chess Masters and Their Games (Hanover, Garden City, 1960)
- The Easiest Way To Learn Chess (Simon & Schuaster, New York, 1960)
- The Elements of Combination Play In Chess (Black Knight, New York, 1935)
- The Fireside Book of Chess (with Chernev) (Simon & Schuster, New York, 1949)
- The Games of the 1933 Match Between S. Flohr and M. Botvinnik
- The Human Side of Chess (Pellegrini & Cudahy, New York 1952)
- The Immortal Games of Capablanca (ISBN 0-486-26333-9) (ISBN 4-87187-578-4)
- The Joys of Chess (Hanover, Garden City, 1961)
- The Macmillan Handbook of Chess
- The Secret of Tactical Chess (Crowell, New York, 1958)
- The Treasury of Chess Lore (McKay, New York, 1951)
- The Unknown Alekhine 1905–1914
- The USCF 7th Biennial US Championship of 1948
- The Way To Better Chess (Macmillan, New York, 1959)
- Thirty Five Nimzowitsch Games, 1904–1927
- Two Weeks To Winning Chess
- Ventnor City Tournament, 1939 (New York, 1939)
- Why You Lose At Chess (Simon & Schustor, New York, 1956)
- Win at Chess (Dover, New York, 1958) (ISBN 0-486-41878-2)
- Winning Chess: How to Perfect your Attacking Play
- Winning Chess for Beginners (Grosset, New York, 1959)
- Winning Chess Openings (Hanover, Garden City, 1961)

==== Book of Chess series (8) ====
- First Book of Chess (with I.A.Horowitz) (Harper & Row, New York 1952)
- Second Book of Chess: The Nine Bad Moves, and How to Avoid Them (Sterling, New York, 1953)
- Third Book of Chess: How to Play the White Pieces (Sterling, New York, 1954)
- Fourth Book of Chess: How to Play the Black Pieces (Sterling, New York, 1955)
- Fifth Book of Chess: How to Win When You're Ahead (Sterling, New York, 1955)
- Sixth Book of Chess: How to Fight Back (Sterling, New York, 1955)
- Seventh Book of Chess: How to Play the King Pawn Openings (Sterling, New York, 1956)
- Eighth Book of Chess: How to Play the Queen Pawn Openings and Other Close Games (Sterling, New York, 1957)

=== Books on other subjects (42) ===
Other books by Fred Reinfeld (a.k.a. Robert Masters):

- A Catalogue of the World's Most Popular Coins, (Sterling, New York, 1956) (ISBN 4-87187-800-7)
- A Catalogue of European Coins (Oak Tree Press, London, 1961)
- A Simplified Guide to Collecting American Paper Money, (Hanover House, New York, 1960)
- A Treasury of American Coins (Garden City, New York, 1961)
- Blazer the Bear (Sterling, New York, 1953)
- Cash for Your Coins (Sterling, New York, 1957)
- Coin Collecting (Bonanza, New York, 1958)
- Coin Collecting for Beginners (with Burton Hobson) (ISBN 0-87980-022-4)
- Coin Collector's Handbook (Sterling, New York, 1954)
- Coin Dictionary and Guide (with C.C. Chamberlain) (Bonanza, New York, 1960)
- Coinometry (with David Boehm) (Sterling, New York, 1952)
- Commemorative Stamps of the U.S.A. (Bramhall House, New York, 1956)
- First Book of Famous Battles (Garden City, New York, 1961)
- Fun with Stamp Collecting (Garden City, NT, 1957)
- How to Be a Winner at Checkers (Hanover House, New York, 1960)
- How to Build a Coin Collection (Sterling, New York, 1958)
- How to Play Checkers (Barnes & Noble, New York, 1957)
- How to Play Top-Notch Checkers (Sterling, New York, 1957)
- How to Win at Checkers (ISBN 0-87980-068-2) (Wilshire, Hollywood, 1957)
- Manual of Coin Collectors and Investors (Sterling, New York, 1963)
- Miracle Drugs and the New Age of Medicine (Sterling, New York, 1957)
- Oliver Twist (Pocket Books, New York, 1948)
- Picture Book of Ancient Coins (Sterling, New York, 1963)
- Picture Book of Atomic Science (Sterling, New York, 1963)
- Pictorial Guide to Coin Conditions (with Burton Hobson) (Garden City, New York, 1962)
- Pony Express (Collier, New York, 1966) (ISBN 0-8032-5786-4)
- Rays Visible and Invisible (Sterling, New York, 1958)
- Stamp Collectors' Handbook
- Stamp Collector's Price Guide (with Robert Obojski) (Sterling, New York, 1986)
- The Biggest Job in the World: The American Presidency (Crowell, New York, 1964)
- The Great Dissenters, Guardians of their Country's Laws and Liberties (Crowell, New York, 1959)
- The Real Book About Famous Battles (Doubleday, New York, 1961)
- The Real Book About Whales and Whaling (Garden City, New York, 1960)
- The Story of Paper Money, Including Catalogue of Values (Sterling, NT, 1957)
- They Almost Made It (Thomas Crowell Co., New York, 1956)
- Trappers of the West (Crowell, New York, 1957)
- Treasures of the Earth (Sterling, New York, 1954)
- Treasury of the World's Coins (Sterling, New York, 1953)
- Uranium and other Miracle Metals (Sterling, New York, 1955)
- US Commemorative Coins and Stamps (Sterling, New York, 1964)
- What's New in Science (Sterling, New York, 1960)
- Young Charles Darwin (Sterling, New York, 1956)
