= David Polland =

American chess player

David S. Polland (born 1908) was an American chess master.

He tied for 2nd-4th at New York 1930/31 (Marshall Chess Club Championship, Arthur Dake won), tied for 6-7th at Rome 1931 (New York State Championship, Fred Reinfeld won), took 6th at Philadelphia 1936 (the 3rd ACF, U.S. Open Chess Championship, Israel Albert Horowitz won), won at Chicago 1937 (the 4th ACF), and won in the New York State Championship in 1937. He tied for 3rd-4th at Boston 1938 (the 5th ACF, Horowitz and Isaac Kashdan won), tied for 6-7th at New York 1938 (the 2nd U.S. Chess Championship, Samuel Reshevsky won), and tied for 8-11th at New York 1940 (the 3rd US-ch, Reshevsky won).
