= Albert Pinkus =

Albert Sidney Pinkus (20 March 1903 in New York City – 4 February 1984 in New York) was an American tropical explorer, chess master and writer. His main career was as an explorer of remote regions, from which he brought back zoological and botanical specimens. He also worked as a stockbroker on Wall Street.

== Biography ==
Pinkus began his career as a stockbroker in the early 1920s. In 1932, he embarked on a series of ten expeditions to the jungles of British Guiana and Venezuela to collect zoological and botanical specimens.

== Stockbroker ==
In 1939, he returned to New York to work on Wall Street as a stockbroker, and resumed his chess career.

== Chess career ==
Pinkus won the Hallgarten Tournament in 1925, and the Junior Masters' Tournament in 1927. In both events he outscored Isaac Kashdan. He tied for fourth/fifth at New York 1940 (US Chess Championship, Samuel Reshevsky won), tied for third/fourth at Ventnor City 1941 (Jacob Levin won), tied for third at New York 1942 (US championship, Reshevsky won), shared third at Ventnor City 1942 (Daniel Yanofsky won), took fifth place at New York 1944 (US championship, Arnold Denker won), and tied for second/third at Ventnor City 1944 (Levin won).

Pinkus won twice in the Manhattan Chess Club Championship (1941 and 1945) and shared second in 1955. He also won the New York State Chess Championship in 1947. He played in several radio matches: US vs. USSR (1945), New York vs. La Plata (1947), US vs. Yugoslavia (1950).

In 1943 and 1944, he published an analysis of the Two Knights Defense in "Chess Review" magazine.

Although he was never awarded an international title in chess, his peak playing strength places him at or close to the International Master class.
