= George Shainswit =

American chess player

Personal information
- Born: January 3, 1918 New York City, United States
- Died: September 5, 1997 (aged 79) New York City, United States

Chess career
- Country: United States

George Shainswit (January 3, 1918 – September 5, 1997) was an American chess player. He played various tournaments including five U.S. Chess Championships.

== Biography ==
George Shainswit was born in New York City, United States on January 3, 1918.

From the end of 1930s to the early 1950s George Shainswit was one of American leading chess players. He played mainly in domestic chess tournaments. In 1943, George Shainswit shared 1st place with Anthony Santasiere in Ventnor City. In 1945, he was an American reserve player in US vs. USSR radio chess match. In 1950, George Shainswit shared 1st place with Arnold Denker in Manhattan Chess Club Championship.

He played in five U.S. Chess Championships:

- in 1938 and ranked in 15th place;
- in 1940 and shared 8th–11th place;
- in 1944 and ranked in 6th place;
- in 1948 and shared 5th–7th place;
- in 1951 and ranked in 9th place.

George Shainswit played for United States in the Chess Olympiad:

- In 1950, at fourth board in the 9th Chess Olympiad in Dubrovnik (+4, =6, -2).
