= Soviet Union–United States radio chess match of 1945 =

The Soviet Union–United States radio chess match of 1945 was a chess match between the United States and the USSR that was conducted over the radio from September 1 to September 4, 1945. The ten leading masters of the United States played the ten leading masters of the Soviet Union (except for Paul Keres) for chess supremacy. The match was played by radio and was a two-game head-to-head match between the teams. The time control was 40 moves in 2 1/2 hours and 16 moves per hour after that. Moves were transmitted using the Uedemann Code. It took an average of 5 minutes to transmit a move. The US team played at the Henry Hudson Hotel in New York. The Soviet team met at the Central Club of Art Masters in Moscow. The USSR team won the match 15½–4½.

This result was met with astonishment around the chess world, since the US had won four straight Chess Olympiads from 1931 to 1937; however, the Soviet Union had not competed in those tournaments. The Soviet program for producing a new generation of chess masters, originated and supervised by Nikolai Krylenko from the early 1930s, clearly was paying dividends. From 1945 onwards, Soviet players would dominate international chess for most of the rest of the 20th century. The radio match proved a watershed and a changing of the guard in the chess world.

Other radio matches took place around this time.

== The matchups ==
The matchup and results are in this table.

USSR vs. US radio match 1945
Board	USSR	Game 1	Game 2	United States	Result (USSR–US)
1	Mikhail Botvinnik	1–0	1–0	Arnold Denker	2–0
2	Vasily Smyslov	1–0	1–0	Samuel Reshevsky	2–0
3	Isaac Boleslavsky	½–½	1–0	Reuben Fine	1½–½
4	Salo Flohr	1–0	0–1	I.A. Horowitz	1–1
5	Alexander Kotov	1–0	1–0	Isaac Kashdan	2–0
6	Igor Bondarevsky	0–1	½–½	Herman Steiner	½–1½
7	Andor Lilienthal	½–½	½–½	Albert Pinkus	1–1
8	Viacheslav Ragozin	1–0	1–0	Herbert Seidman	2–0
9	Vladimir Makogonov	1–0	½–½	Abraham Kupchik	1½–½
10	David Bronstein	1–0	1–0	Anthony Santasiere	2–0
Total					15½–4½

Nine of ten Americans and six of ten Soviets were Jewish.

The match featured most of the leading players in the world: including the first, second and equal third placegetters at the 1948 World Championship (Botvinnik, Smyslov, Reshevsky); Fine, who declined his invitation to the 1948 Championship; and the top two placegetters in the 1950 Candidates tournament (Bronstein and Boleslavsky).

== Reserve players ==
The following players were reservists in the U.S. team, to be called on, in the order given, if any of the primary team are unable to compete: Alexander Kevitz, Robert Willman, Jacob Levin, George Shainswit, Weaver W. Adams, Edward Lasker, Fred Reinfeld, Edward S. Jackson, Jr., Samuel Factor, and Martin C. Stark. The Soviet reserves were: Alexander Konstantinopolsky, Vitaly Chekhover, Iosif Rudakovsky, and Peter Romanovsky.

== Other radio matches ==
- Moscow vs. Leningrad, March 1941
- USSR vs. England, 18-6, 1946
- Australia vs. France, 5½-4½, 1946
- Spain vs. Argentina, 8-7, 1946

The USSR also won these matches:

- USSR vs. United Kingdom, 1947
- USSR vs. United Kingdom, 1954
- USSR vs. United States, 1954
- USSR vs. United States, 1955

== See also ==
- 1945 in chess
- Anglo-American cable chess matches
