= Reuben Fine =

American chess grandmaster (1914–1993)

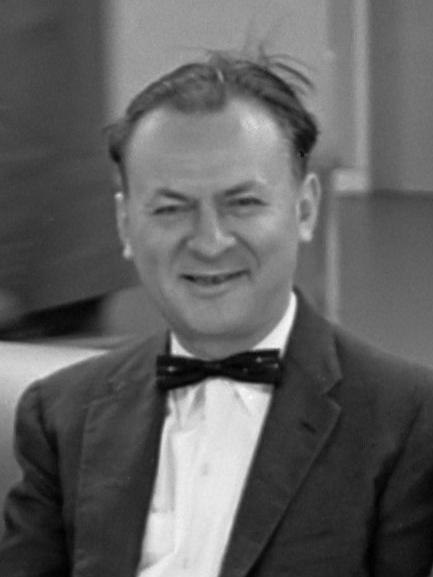
- Fine in 1961

Personal information
- Born: October 11, 1914 New York City, U.S.
- Died: March 26, 1993 (aged 78) New York City, U.S.

Chess career
- Country: United States
- Title: Grandmaster (1950)

Reuben C. Fine (October 11, 1914 – March 26, 1993) was an American chess player, psychologist, university professor, and author of many books on both chess and psychology. He was one of the strongest chess players in the world from the mid-1930s until his retirement from chess in 1951. He was granted the title of International Grandmaster by FIDE in 1950, when titles were introduced.

Fine's best result was his equal first place in the 1938 AVRO tournament, one of the strongest tournaments of all time. After the death of world champion Alexander Alekhine in 1946, Fine was one of six players invited to compete for the World Championship in 1948. He declined the invitation, however, and virtually retired from serious competition around that time, although he did play a few events until 1951.

Fine won five medals (four gold) in three Chess Olympiads. He won the US Open all seven times he entered (1932, 1933, 1934, 1935, 1939, 1940, 1941). He was the author of several chess books, covering endgame, opening, and middlegame.

== Early life and family ==
Fine was born in the Bronx, New York City to Russian Jewish parents Jacob and Bertha (Nedner) Fine. He had a sister, Evelyn (born in 1912), and was raised by his mother alone from the age of two. An uncle taught him chess when he was eight.

== Chess career ==
=== Teenage master ===
Fine began chess as a young teenager at the famous Manhattan Chess Club, where he hustled for nickels, until he was asked to stop; he used the money to help feed his family. Afterwards he moved to the rival Marshall Chess Club in New York City, stomping grounds for many famous players, such as Bobby Fischer, later on. At this stage of his career, Fine played a great deal of blitz chess, and he eventually became one of the best blitz players in the world. By the early 1930s, he could nearly hold his own in blitz chess against the then world champion Alexander Alekhine, although Fine admitted that the few times he played blitz with Alekhine's predecessor José Raúl Capablanca, the latter beat him "mercilessly".

Fine's first significant master-level event was the 1930 New York Young Masters tournament, which was won by Arthur Dake. He narrowly lost a 1931 stakes match to fellow young New York master Arnold Denker.

Fine placed second at the 1931 New York State Championship with a score of 8/11, half a point behind Fred Reinfeld. Fine won the 15th Marshall Chess Club Championship of 1931 with 10½/13, half a point ahead of Reinfeld. He defeated Herman Steiner by 5½–4½ at New York 1932; this was the first of three matches between them.

=== U.S. Open Champion ===
At 17, Fine won his first of seven US Opens at Minneapolis 1932 with 9½/11, half a point ahead of Samuel Reshevsky; this tournament was known as the Western Open at the time. Fine played in his first top-class international tournament at Pasadena 1932, where he shared 7th–10th with 5/11; the winner was world champion Alexander Alekhine. Fine repeated as champion in the 16th Marshall Club Championship, held from October to December 1932, with 11½/13, 2½ points ahead of the runner-up.

=== College ===
Fine graduated from City College of New York in 1932, at the age of 18; he was a successful student there. He captained CCNY to the 1931 National Collegiate team title; a teammate was master Sidney Bernstein. This tournament later evolved into the Pan American Intercollegiate Team Chess Championship. Fine then decided to try the life of a chess professional for a few years.

=== Olympiad results ===
Fine won the U.S. team selection tournament, New York 1933, with 8/10. This earned him the first of three national team berths for the chess Olympiads. Fine won five medals (including three team golds) representing the United States; his detailed record follows; his totals are (+20−6=19), for 65.6%.

- Folkestone 1933: board three, 9/13 (+6−1=6), team gold, board silver
- Warsaw 1935: board one, 9/17 (+5−4=8), team gold
- Stockholm 1937: board two, 11½/15 (+9−1=5), team gold, board gold

=== North American successes ===
Fine repeated as champion at the U.S./Western Open, Detroit 1933, with 12/13, half a point ahead of Reshevsky. Fine won the 17th Marshall Club Championship, 1933–34, with 9½/11. He defeated Al Horowitz in a match at New York 1934 by 6–3. Fine shared 1st–2nd at the U.S./Western Open, Chicago 1934, on 7½/9, with Reshevsky. He then shared 1st–3rd at Mexico City 1934, on 11/12, with Herman Steiner and Arthur Dake. At Syracuse 1934, Fine shared 3rd–4th, on 10/14, as Reshevsky won. Fine won his fourth straight U.S./Western Open at Milwaukee 1935, scoring 6½/9 in the preliminary round, and then 8/10 in the finals.

=== European debut ===
Having had outstanding successes in North America, Fine tried his first European individual international tournament at Łódź 1935, where he shared 2nd–3rd with 6/9 behind Savielly Tartakower. Fine won Hastings 1935–36 with 7½/9, a point ahead of Salo Flohr.

=== Narrow misses at U.S. Championship ===
Although Fine was active and very successful in U.S. open tournaments, he was never able to win the U.S. Championship, usually placing behind his great American rival, Samuel Reshevsky. The U.S. Championship was organized in a round-robin format during that era. When in 1936 Frank Marshall voluntarily gave up the American Championship title he had held since 1909, the result was the first modern U.S. Championship tournament. Fine scored 10½/15 in the U.S. Championship, New York City 1936, and tied third–fourth, as Reshevsky won. In the U.S. Championship, New York 1938, Fine placed second with 12½/16, with Reshevsky repeating as champion. In the U.S. Championship, New York 1940, Fine again scored 12½/16 for second place, as Reshevsky won for the third straight time. Then in the 1944 U.S. Championship at New York, Fine scored 14½/17 for second, losing his game to Arnold Denker, and finishing half a point back, as the latter won his only national title.

Fine tallied 50/64 in his four U.S. title attempts, for 78.1%, but was never champion. Not being national champion seriously hurt Fine's prospects for making a career from chess.

=== International success ===
However, Fine's international tournament record in the 1930s was superior to Reshevsky's. The former did play many more top-class international events than the latter during that period, and was usually near the top of the table. By the end of 1937, Fine had won a string of strong European international tournaments, and was one of the most successful players in the world. Fine won at Oslo 1936 with 6½/7, half a point ahead of Flohr. Fine captured Zandvoort 1936 with 8½/11, ahead of World Champion Max Euwe, Savielly Tartakower, and Paul Keres. Fine shared 3rd–5th at the elite Nottingham 1936 event with 9½/14, half a point behind winners José Raúl Capablanca and Mikhail Botvinnik. Fine shared 1st–2nd at Amsterdam 1936 on 5/7 with Euwe, half a point ahead of Alekhine. Fine placed 2nd at Hastings 1936–37 with 7½/9, as Alekhine won.

The year 1937 was Fine's most successful. He won at Leningrad 1937 with 4/5, ahead of Grigory Levenfish, who shared first in that year's Soviet Championship. Fine won at Moscow 1937 with 5/7. Those two victories make Fine one of a very select group of foreigners to have won on Russian soil. Fine shared 1st–2nd at Margate 1937 with Keres on 7½/9, 1½ points ahead of Alekhine. Fine shared 1st–3rd at Ostend 1937 with Keres and Henry Grob on 6/9. At Stockholm 1937, Fine won with 8/9, 1½ points ahead of Gideon Ståhlberg. Fine then defeated Stahlberg by 5–3 in a match held at Gothenburg 1937. Fine placed 2nd at the elite Semmering/Baden 1937 tournament with 8/14, behind Keres. At Kemeri, Latvia 1937, Fine had a rare relatively weak result, with just 9/17 for 8th place, as the title was shared by Reshevsky, Flohr, and Vladimirs Petrovs. Fine shared 4th–5th at Hastings 1937–38 with 6/9 as Reshevsky won.

=== AVRO 1938 ===
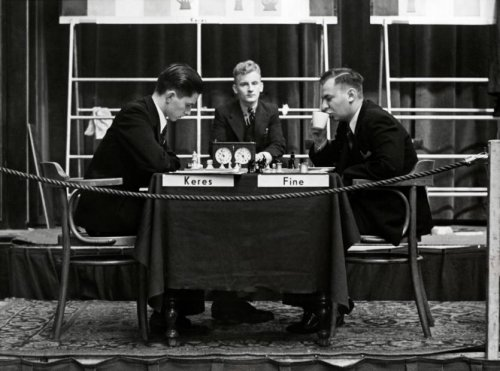
Fine playing against Paul Keres at AVRO tournament in 1938

In 1938, Fine tied for first place with Paul Keres in the prestigious AVRO tournament in the Netherlands, scoring 8½/14, with Keres placed first on tiebreak. This was one of the most famous tournaments of the 20th century. It was organized with the hope that the winner of AVRO, a double round-robin tournament, would be the next challenger to world champion Alexander Alekhine. Since Alekhine won the title in 1927, he had been avoiding a rematch with his predecessor, Capablanca, whom many considered the strongest possible challenger. Fine finished ahead of future champion Mikhail Botvinnik, current champion Alekhine, former world champions Max Euwe and Capablanca, and Samuel Reshevsky and Salo Flohr. Fine won both of his games against Alekhine. Fine got out to a tremendous start, scoring five wins and a draw in his first six games, but then lost in round seven to Keres, and this wound up as the decisive game for the tournament victor, providing his tiebreak.

=== Wartime years ===
As World War II interrupted any prospects for a world championship match, Fine turned to chess writing. In 1939, Fine became the first world-class player to edit the classic opening guide Modern Chess Openings. His work on the sixth edition of the book led to a significant increase in sales. In 1941 he wrote Basic Chess Endings, a compendium of endgame analysis which, some 80 years later, is still considered one of the best works on this subject. His book was the most comprehensive on the subject written to that time, included significant original work by Fine, and received worldwide acclaim. His The Ideas Behind the Chess Openings, though now out of date, is still useful for grasping the underlying ideas of many standard chess openings; it was revised in 1989.

Fine played a few serious American events during World War II, with international chess at a virtual standstill, and continued his successes with dominant scores. He won the U.S. Open at New York 1939 with 10½/11, half a point ahead of Reshevsky. In the 23rd Marshall Club Championship of 1939, Fine won with 14/16. He won the 1940 U.S. Open at Dallas with a perfect 8/8 in the finals, three points ahead of Herman Steiner. Fine won the New York State Championship, Hamilton 1941, with 8/10, a point ahead of Reshevsky, Arnold Denker and Isaac Kashdan. Fine won the 1941 Marshall Club Championship with 14/15, ahead of Frank Marshall. Fine won the 1941 U.S. Open at St. Louis, with 4/5 in the preliminaries, and 8/9 in the finals. Fine won the 1942 Washington, D.C. Chess Divan title with 7/7. He defeated Herman Steiner in match play for the second time by 3½–½ at Washington 1944. Fine won the U.S. Speed Championships of both 1944 (10/11) and 1945 (10/11). In the Pan-American Championship, Hollywood 1945, Fine placed 2nd with 9/12, behind Reshevsky. He played in the 1945 US vs USSR Radio team match, scoring ½/2 on board three against Isaac Boleslavsky. Then Fine traveled to Europe one last time to compete, in the 1946 Moscow team match against the USSR, scoring ½/2 on board three against Paul Keres.

=== Declines to enter 1948 World Championship ===
As the World War ended in early September 1945, Fine was 30 years of age, and working on his doctorate in psychology. After World Champion Alekhine died in March 1946, FIDE (the World Chess Federation) organized a World Chess Championship tournament to determine the new champion. Alekhine was the first champion to die as title-holder, creating an unprecedented problem. As co-winner in the AVRO tournament, Fine was invited to participate, but he declined, for reasons that are the subject of speculation even today. Fine had played a third match against Herman Steiner at Los Angeles 1947, winning 5–1; this match was training for his potential world championship appearance.

Publicly, Fine stated that he could not interrupt work on his doctoral dissertation in psychology. Negotiations over the tournament had been protracted, and for a long time it was unclear whether this World Championship event would in fact take place. Fine wrote that he didn't want to spend many months preparing and then see the tournament cancelled. However, it has also been suggested that Fine declined to play because he suspected there would be collaboration among the three Soviet participants to ensure that one of them won the championship. In the August 2004 issue of Chess Life, for example, Larry Evans gave his recollection that "Fine told me he didn't want to waste three months of his life watching Russians throw games to each other." Fine's 1951 written statement on the matter in his book The World's Greatest Chess Games was:

Unfortunately for the Western masters the Soviet political organization was stronger than that of the West. The U.S. Chess Federation was a meaningless paper organization, generally antagonistic to the needs of its masters. The Dutch Chess Federation did not choose to act. The FIDE was impotent. The result was a rescheduling of the tournament for the following year, with the vital difference that now half was to be played in Holland, half in the U.S.S.R. Dissatisfied with this arrangement and the general tenor of the event, I withdrew.

Edward Winter quoted Fine as saying financial, professional and scheduling problems all influenced his decision.

=== Final competitive appearances ===
Once Fine completed his doctorate, he did play some more competitive chess. He won at New York 1948 with 8/9, ahead of Miguel Najdorf, Max Euwe, and Hermann Pilnik. Fine drew a match against Najdorf at 4–4 at New York 1949. He participated for the U.S. in the 1950 radio match against Yugoslavia, drawing his only game. Fine received the title of International Grandmaster in 1950 from FIDE, on its first official list of titled players. Fine's final top-class event was the Maurice Wertheim Memorial, New York 1951, where he scored 7/11 for 4th, as Reshevsky won.

Given his pre-war results, Fine was invited to participate in the 1950 Candidates Tournament at Budapest, but declined his invitation; this tournament was the first to select an official challenger to the World Champion under the auspices of FIDE, the World Chess Federation.

=== Lifetime scores against top players ===
Fine had a relatively short career in top-level chess, but scored well against top players. He faced five World Champions: Emanuel Lasker (+1−0=0); José Raúl Capablanca (+0−0=5, excluding simultaneous games); Alexander Alekhine (+3−2=4); Max Euwe (+2−2=3); and Mikhail Botvinnik (+1−0=2).

His main American rivals were Samuel Reshevsky (+3−4=12); Herman Steiner (+21−4=8); Isaac Kashdan (+6−1=6); Albert Simonson (+6−1=1); Al Horowitz (+10−2=7); Arnold Denker (+7−6=7); Fred Reinfeld (+10−5=7); and Arthur Dake (+7−7=5, with three losses as a 16-year-old against Dake in his 20s).

Internationally, Fine faced the best of his time, and usually more than held his own, with three exceptions. He struggled against Paul Keres (+1−3=8); Milan Vidmar (+0−1=2); and Isaac Boleslavsky (+0−1=1), but he handled everyone else: Miguel Najdorf (+3−3=5); Savielly Tartakower (+2−1=4); Salo Flohr (+2−0=7); Grigory Levenfish (+1−0=0); George Alan Thomas (+2−0=3); Erich Eliskases (+1−0=2); Viacheslav Ragozin (+1−0=1); Vladimirs Petrovs (+2−1=1); Efim Bogoljubow (+1−0=1); Jan Foltys (+2−0=0); Salo Landau (+4−0=1); George Koltanowski (+2−0=1); Igor Bondarevsky (+1−0=0); Géza Maróczy (+1−0=0); William Winter (+4−0=0); Ernst Grünfeld (+1−0=0); Gideon Ståhlberg (+4−2=5); Andor Lilienthal (+1−0=0); László Szabó (+0−0=1); Vladas Mikėnas (+1−0=1); Rudolph Spielmann (+0−0=1); and Conel Hugh O'Donel Alexander (+1−0=3).

Finally, against the new generation of American masters which emerged in the late 1940s, Fine proved he could still perform well: Arthur Bisguier (+1−0=1); Larry Evans (+0−0=2); George Kramer (+1−0=1); and Robert Byrne (+0−0=1).

=== Top ten for eight years ===
Although FIDE, the World Chess Federation, did not formally introduce chess ratings for international play until 1970, it is nevertheless possible to retrospectively rate players' performances from before that time. The site Chessmetrics.com, which specializes in historical ratings throughout chess history, ranks Fine in the world's top ten players for more than eight years, from March 1936 until October 1942, and then again from January 1949 until December 1950. Fine was inducted into the U.S. Chess Hall of Fame in 1986, the charter class. He continued his successful chess writing career for many years after he retired from competition.

=== Notable games ===
- Reuben Fine vs. Mikhail Botvinnik, Amsterdam AVRO 1938, French Defence, Winawer/Advance Variation (C17), 1–0 In the final position, "Black does not have a single move, and Rf3 is threatened. A combination of a splendid strategic idea with tactical subtleties." (Botvinnik)
- Reuben Fine vs. Salomon Flohr, Amsterdam AVRO 1938, French Defence, Winawer/Advance Variation (C17), 1–0 Deep tactics in an unusual variant of the French Defense.
- Reuben Fine vs. Herman Steiner, Pan-American Championship, Hollywood 1945. Queen's Gambit Accepted, Classical (D29), 1–0 Fine sees further than his opponent in a sharp tactical position.

== Professional life ==
Fine earned a bachelor's degree from the City College of New York in 1932.

During World War II, Fine worked for the U.S. Navy, analyzing the probability of German U-boats surfacing at certain points in the Atlantic Ocean. Fine also worked as a translator.

After World War II, he earned his doctorate in psychology from the University of Southern California. After receiving his doctorate he abandoned professional chess to concentrate on a new profession as a professor. Fine continued playing chess casually throughout his life (including several friendly games played in 1963 against Bobby Fischer, one of which is included in Fischer's My 60 Memorable Games). In 1956 he wrote an article, "Psychoanalytic Observations on Chess and Chess Masters", for a psychological journal. Later, Fine turned the article into a book, The Psychology of the Chess Player, in which he provided insights steeped in Freudian theory. Fine is not the first person to have examined the mind as it relates to chess: Alfred Binet, the inventor of the IQ test, had studied the mental functionality of good chess players, and found that they often had enhanced mental traits, such as a good memory. He went on to publish A History of Psychoanalysis (1979) and a number of other books on psychology.

Journalist Gilbert Cant observed:

A great chess player, Manhattan's Reuben Fine, has popularized a psychology of chess studded with phallic symbols, spattered with anal-sadistic impulses and imbued with latent homosexuality. In successive rounds, Fine once defeated Botvinnik, Reshevsky, Euwe, Flohr and Alekhine, and drew with Capablanca. When Fine switched his major interest from chess to psychoanalysis, the result was a loss for chess—and a draw, at best, for psychoanalysis. Many psychologists, some Freudians included, now believe that the sexual symbolism in chess is vastly overdrawn.

Fine served as a visiting professor at CCNY, the University of Amsterdam, the Lowell Institute of Technology, and the University of Florence. Fine founded the Creative Living Center in New York City.

== Personal life ==
Fine married five times, all but the last ending in divorce. He had two biological children and one stepson.

Per the Los Angeles Times, he married Charlotte Margoshes in 1937. The New York County registrar lists a marriage certificate for Charlotte Margoshes on October 8, 1936, but the marriage was very short. The New York Times first mentions a marriage to Emma Thea Keesing (1916–1960), whom he met in the Netherlands, married in September 1937, and divorced in 1944.

Fine remarried in 1946, to Sonya Lebeaux. They had two children together, a son, Benjamin, and a daughter. He wrote The Teenage Chess Book with Benjamin.

His last marriage, to Marcia Fine, lasted to his death in 1993.

== Books ==
=== On chess ===
- Dr. Lasker's Chess Career, by Reuben Fine and Fred Reinfeld, 1935, ISBN 4-87187-531-8.
- Modern Chess Openings, sixth edition, 1939.
- Basic Chess Endings, 1941, McKay. Revised in 2003 by Pal Benko. ISBN 0-8129-3493-8.
- Chess the Easy Way, 1942. 1986 Paperback re-issue. ISBN 0-671-62427-X, ISBN 0-923891-50-1.
- The Ideas Behind the Chess Openings, 1943. Revised in 1948 and 1989. McKay, ISBN 0-8129-1756-1, ISBN 4-87187-460-5.
- The Middlegame in Chess. ISBN 0-8129-3484-9.
- Chess Marches On, 1946. ISBN 4-87187-511-3.
- The World's A Chessboard, 1948. ISBN 4-87187-512-1.
- Practical Chess Openings, 1948. ISBN 4-87187-534-2.
- The World's Great Chess Games, Crown Publishers, Inc. 1951, LOC # 51–12014; Ishi Press, 2012. ISBN 4-87187-532-6.
- Lessons From My Games, 1958, ISBN 4-87187-533-4.
- The Teenage Chess Book, 1965 (assisted by son Benjamin Fine), ISBN 978-4871875790
- The Psychology of the Chess Player, 1967. ISBN 4-87187-815-5.
- Bobby Fischer's Conquest of the World's Chess Championship: The Psychology and Tactics of the Title Match, 1973. ISBN 0-923891-47-1.

=== On psychology ===
- Freud: a Critical Re-evaluation of his Theories (1962).
- The Healing of the Mind: The Technique of Psychoanalytic Psychotherapy (1971).
- The Development of Freud's Thought (1973).
- Psychoanalytic Psychology (1975).
- The History of Psychoanalysis (1979).
- The Intimate Hour (1979).
- The Psychoanalytic Vision (1981).
- The Logic of Psychology (1983).
- The Meaning of Love in Human Experience (1985).
- Narcissism, the Self, and Society (1986).
- The Forgotten Man: Understanding the Male Psyche (1987).
- Troubled Men: The Psychology, Emotional Conflicts, and Therapy of Men (1988).
- Love and Work: The Value System of Psychoanalysis (1990).
- Troubled Women: Roles and Realities in Psychoanalytic Perspective (1992).

== See also ==
- List of Jewish chess players
