= Milton Hanauer =

American chess player (1908–1988)

Milton Loeb Hanauer (5 August 1908 – 16 April 1988) was a public school principal, chess master and Marshall Chess Club official.

Born in Harrison, New York, He is best known for running the New York school competition that became known as the Hanauer League and for writing the book Chess Made Simple.

His playing career is not well known, but he played on the silver medal winning US team in the 2nd Chess Olympiad at The Hague 1928, he qualified for four US Championships, and he won games from Reuben Fine and Isaac Kashdan.
