= Herman Steiner =

American chess player, organizer and columnist

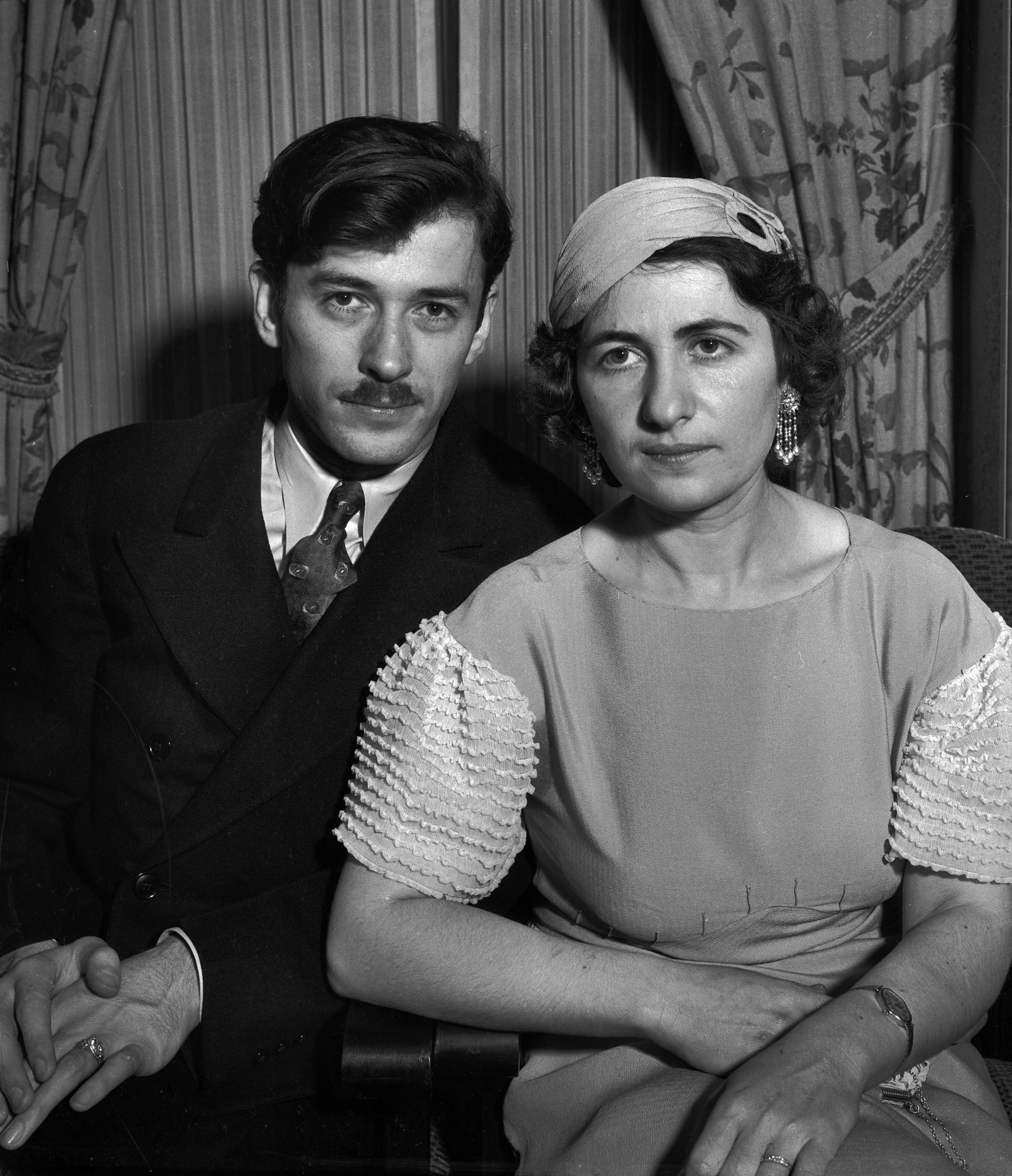
Herman and Selma Steiner, 1933

Herman Steiner (April 15, 1905 – November 25, 1955) was an American chess player, organizer, and columnist. He won the U.S. Chess Championship in 1948 and became International Master in 1950. Even more important than his playing career were his efforts promoting chess in the U.S., particularly on the West Coast. An exemplar of the Romantic School of chess, Steiner was a successor to the American chess tradition of Paul Morphy, Harry Nelson Pillsbury, and Frank Marshall.

== Biography ==
Born in Dunaszerdahely, Austria-Hungary (now Dunajská Streda, Slovakia), Steiner came to New York City at a young age. For a time, he was active as a boxer. At age 16 he was a member of the Hungarian Chess Club and the Stuyvesant Chess Club. With the experience he gained in the active New York City chess scene, Steiner rapidly developed his chess skill and in 1929 he tied for first place (with Jacob Bernstein) in the New York State championship tournament at Buffalo. The same year he was first in the Premier Reserves at Hastings, England.

Steiner left New York for the West, settling in Los Angeles in 1932. He became chess editor of the Los Angeles Times that year, writing a chess column until his death. He formed the Steiner Chess Club, later called the Hollywood Chess Group, headquartered in a clubhouse next to the Steiner residence. The Hollywood Chess Group was visited by many movie stars including Humphrey Bogart, Lauren Bacall, Charles Boyer, and José Ferrer. Steiner and the Hollywood Chess Group organized the Pan-American International Tournament in 1945 and the Second Pan-American Chess Congress in 1954.

Steiner played three challenge matches against Reuben Fine, one of the world's top players. Fine won all three matches: by 5½–4½ at New York 1932, by 3½–½ at Washington, D.C. 1944, and by 5–1 at Los Angeles 1947.

Steiner at Groningen 1946

One of his major international wins was at the 1946 London Victory Invitational, the first significant European tournament held after the end of World War II. Steiner challenged Arnold Denker in 1946 to a match for the United States Chess Championship at Los Angeles, but lost 6–4. In 1948 Steiner won the United States Chess Championship at South Fallsburg, New York, ahead of Isaac Kashdan.

Steiner was a member of the United States Chess Federation's teams sent abroad to the Chess Olympiads in The Hague 1928, Hamburg 1930, Prague 1931 and Dubrovnik 1950. As reigning U.S. champion he captained the 1950 team.

In the historic 1945 U.S.–USSR radio match between teams from the U.S. and the USSR, Steiner was the only U.S. player to achieve a plus score. Although the American team including Reuben Fine, Samuel Reshevsky, Arnold Denker, and Isaac Kashdan, was badly beaten, Steiner scored 1½–½ against Igor Bondarevsky.

Steiner was very active as a player in West Coast tournaments, winning the only two California Open tournaments he entered in 1954 and 1955, and winning the California State Championship in 1953 and 1954. He was defending his State Championship in Los Angeles in 1955, when after finishing his fifth-round game (a 62-move draw against William Addison) he felt unwell and his afternoon game was postponed. About 2 hours later around 9:30 pm, Steiner died practically instantaneously of a massive coronary occlusion while being attended by a physician. By agreement of the players, the 1955 California State Championship tournament was canceled.

== Tournament record ==
| Date | Tournament | Score | Result |
|---|---|---|---|
| 1929 | N.Y. State Championship | | 1st–2nd (tied with J. Bernstein) |
| 1929 | Hastings Premier Reserves | | 1st |
| 1931 | Berlin | | 1st (ahead of Sämisch and L. Steiner) |
| 1931 | Brun | | 2nd (behind Flohr) |
| 1932 | Pasadena International Tournament | 6–5 | 4th–6th (tied with Dake and Reshevsky, behind Alekhine and Kashdan) |
| 1935 | Mexico City | | 1st–3rd (tied with Fine and Dake) |
| 1942 | U.S. Open | | 1st–2nd (tied with Yanofsky) |
| 1945 | California State Championship | 8–1 | 1st–2nd (tied with Adolf Jay Fink) |
| 1946 | London | | 1st (ahead of Tartakower and O.S. Bernstein) |
| 1946 | U.S. Open | | 1st |
| 1946 | Groningen | | 18th |
| 1948 | U.S. Championship | | 1st |
| 1952 | Hollywood International Tournament | | 3rd (behind Gligorić and Pomar) |
| 1952 | Stockholm Interzonal | 10–10 | 11-13th (tied with Pilnik and Pachman) |
| 1953 | California State Championship | 7.5–1.5 | 1st |
| 1954 | California State Championship | 7.5–1.5 | 1st |
| 1954 | California Open | | 1st |
| 1955 | California Open | | 1st |
| 1955 | California State Championship | 4–1 | tournament cancelled |

| Preceded by Samuel Reshevsky | United States Chess Champion; 1948–1950 | Succeeded by Larry Evans |
