= Vladimir Makogonov =

Azerbaijani/Soviet chess player

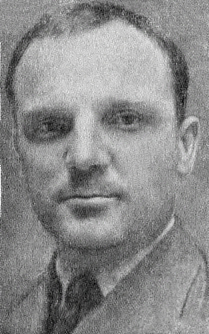
- Makogonov in c. 1938

Personal information
- Born: August 27, 1904 Nakhchivan, Erivan Governorate, Russian Empire
- Died: January 2, 1993 (aged 88) Baku, Azerbaijan

Chess career
- Country: Azerbaijani SSR, Soviet Union
- Title: International Master (1950); Grandmaster (honorary, 1987)

Vladimir Andreevich Makogonov (Russian: Владимир Андреевич Макогонов; August 27, 1904 – January 2, 1993) was a Soviet chess player from Azerbaijan SSR. He was born in Nakhchivan but lived in Baku for most of his life. He became an International Master in 1950 and was awarded an honorary Grandmaster title in 1987.

Makogonov never became well-known outside the Soviet Union, but was highly respected in his country as a player and coach. He was one of the world's strongest players in the 1940s: Chessmetrics calculates his highest historical rating as 2735 in October 1945, and his highest historical world rank as fifth in July 1945.

== Chess career ==
Makogonov was the champion of Azerbaijan five times between 1947 and 1952, the exception being the 1950 tournament, which was won by Boris Levitas, and played in eight USSR Championships between 1927 and 1947, his best result being fourth in 1937 and a tie for fourth place in 1939. Notable tournament results include a tie for third place at Leningrad–Moscow 1939 behind Salo Flohr and Samuel Reshevsky, and second place at Sverdlovsk 1943 behind Mikhail Botvinnik, but ahead of Vasily Smyslov and Isaac Boleslavsky. In 1942, he defeated Salo Flohr in a twelve-game match held in Baku by a score of 7½–4½. He played on Board 9 in the 1945 USSR–US radio match, beating Abraham Kupchik 1½–½. He almost stopped playing competitively in the 1950s.

Makogonov was also very well known as a chess coach. He helped Smyslov prepare for his 1957 World Chess Championship match against Botvinnik. He trained Vladimir Bagirov and Genrikh Chepukaitis, and on Botvinnik's recommendation, became one of young Garry Kasparov's first teachers.

His brother, Mikhail Makogonov (1900–1943), was also a chess master; they tied for first in the first Baku chess championship in 1923. Unfortunately, Mikhail was killed during WW2.

Makogonov died on January 2, 1993, at the age of 88.

== Legacy ==
As a player, Makogonov was noted for his positional style. He made several contributions to chess opening theory; there is a Makogonov Variation in the King's Indian Defence (1.d4 Nf6 2.c4 g6 3.Nc3 Bg7 4.e4 d6 5.h3) and in the Grünfeld Defence (1.d4 Nf6 2.c4 g6 3.Nc3 d5 4.Nf3 Bg7 5.e3 0-0 6.b4). He helped develop the Tartakower System in the Queen's Gambit Declined, which is called the Tartakower–Makogonov–Bondarevsky System or TMB System in Russian. In former Soviet countries, his name is associated with the middlegame rule-of-thumb that in the absence of an advantageous plan of attack one should identify one's worst-placed piece and move it to a better square, though it is recorded already in the 19th century.
