= Albert Simonson =

American chess player (1914–1965)

Albert Charles Simonson (December 26, 1914 in New York City – November 16, 1965 in San Juan, Puerto Rico) was an American chess master. He was one of the strongest American players of the 1930s, and was part of the American team which won the gold medals at the 1933 Chess Olympiad. Simonson was certainly at least of International Master strength, based on his limited playing career.

== Biography ==
Simonson was born into a wealthy family. His father Leo was a successful wigmaker to the Manhattan rich and the theatre and movie businesses. His mother Irene was from the family that owned the Illinois Watch Case Co. in Elgin, Illinois.. Simonson showed precocious skill with chess, soon after learning the game. At New York 1933, he scored 7/10 to tie for 2nd-3rd places, behind only winner Reuben Fine. This earned him selection to the United States chess Olympiad team at age 18. In the Olympiad, at Folkestone 1933, he played on the first reserve board and scored 3/6, as the Americans won the team gold medals. Simonson's teammates were Fine, Isaac Kashdan, Arthur Dake, and Frank Marshall, who all eventually became Grandmasters.

In the 17th Championship of the Marshall Chess Club, 1933–34, Simonson scored 7/11 to finish 6th. In the 1935 U.S. Open at Milwaukee, he scored 5.5/10 to tie for 4th-6th places.

In the first modern U.S. Chess Championship, New York City 1936, Simonson placed second with 11/15, behind only winner Samuel Reshevsky. He scored 11/16 in the 1938 United States Championship at New York, to finish third, behind Reshevsky and Fine. In the United States Championship of 1940, again at New York, he tied for 4th-5th places, with 10/16, behind Reshevsky, Fine, and Isaac Kashdan. However, in the 1951 U.S. Championship in New York, Simonson finished tied for 11th-12th, with only 3.5/11. His total in four U.S. Championships was 35.5/58, for 61.2 per cent.

Simonson defeated Reshevsky in a Metropolitan League team match in 1950, at a time when Reshevsky was among the world's top five players. Simonson was ranked sixth in the country on the very first official rating list, issued in 1950, from the United States Chess Federation.

Simonson was a pioneer in the direct mail business field. He served with the United States Army during World War II, attaining the rank of Sergeant. According to his close friend, Grandmaster Arnold Denker, from the acclaimed book by Denker and Larry Parr -- The Bobby Fischer I Knew And Other Stories—Simonson was very skilled at indoor card and board games, but had a serious gambling problem. He was married three times, and fathered three children. There is a small selection of his games at chessbase.com.

== Notable chess games ==
- Leonhard Abramavicius vs Albert Simonson, Folkestone Olympiad 1933, King's Indian Defence, Fianchetto Variation (E62), 0-1 In this gorgeous game, Simonson unleashes a nasty Kingside attack using strategy which would start to become popular a few years later.
- Reuben Fine vs Albert Simonson, U.S. Championship, New York 1936, Queen's Gambit Declined, Delayed Exchange (Three Knights') Variation (D37), 0-1 Fine and Samuel Reshevsky were the top American players of the 1930s, but here Fine gets overambitious, and is taken apart by Simonson's counterattack.
- Albert Simonson vs Herman Steiner, U.S. Championship, New York 1936, King's Indian Attack / Zukertort Opening (A05), 1-0 White gradually builds up his position against the formidable tactician Steiner.
- Albert Simonson vs Arnold Denker, U.S. Championship, New York 1936, Queen's Indian Defence (E19), 1-0 Denker forces the pace with queenside activity, but gets outplayed once the minor pieces are exchanged, as White's passed a-pawn is a distraction which forces open lines.
- Weaver Adams vs Albert Simonson, U.S. Championship, New York 1940, Bishop's Opening (C24), 0-1 This is a real tactical slugfest with castling on opposite sides, but Simonson sees further.
- Albert Simonson vs Albert Pinkus, U.S. Championship, New York 1951, Queen's Gambit Declined (D46), 1-0 In this battle between two razor-sharp tacticians, Simonson takes a huge risk by leaving his King in the centre, and launches a nasty h-file attack which hits paydirt.
