= Nellie Casman =

Russian-born American actress and singer in Yiddish theater

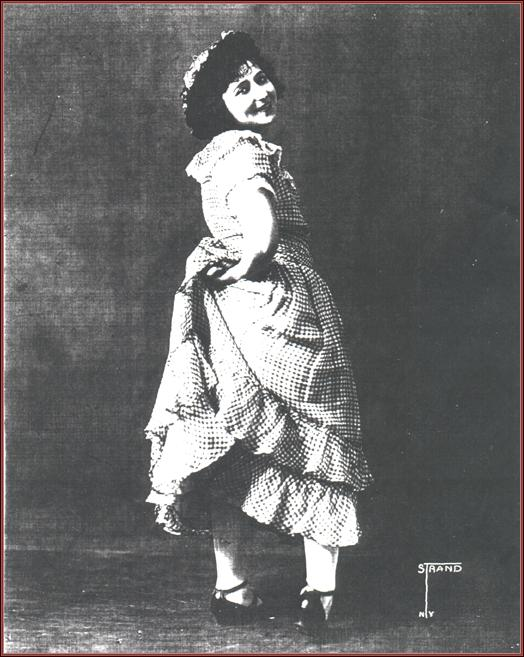
- Nellie Casman in 1915
- Born: 1896; Proskurov, Russian Empire
- Died: May 27, 1984 (age 88); New York City, New York, U.S.
- Occupation(s): actress and singer in Yiddish theater
- Years active: 1910–1982

Nellie Casman (1896–1984) was an American actress and singer in Yiddish theater. She was born in Proskurov, Russian Empire, and moved to the United States in the early 1900s. She lived in Philadelphia where her father was a hazzan. Casman showed such talent as an actress when a child, the actress Rose Rubin took her into a professional Yiddish theater, where she began to play child roles in 1910.

Playing Gitele in Zalmon Libin's Gebrokhene hertser ("Broken Hearts"), she came to the attention of Regina Prager's husband, a theater manager, who hired her for his company in New York. She played several years as a soubrette in vaudeville houses and became successful enough to be hired to replace Bessie Thomashefsky in Edelstein's People's Theater where she played opposite David Kessler in Mish Mash. She then abandoned "legitimate theater" and went back to vaudeville (in English as well as Yiddish). She recorded Yiddish songs and couplets for the Victor and Columbia labels. In 1913, Casman married playwright Shlomo "Samuel" Steinberg and collaborated with him in writing songs and shows; their biggest hit, written in 1923, was "Yossel, Yossel", popularized in English as "Joseph Joseph" by the Andrews Sisters in 1938.

She went to Warsaw in 1929, concertizing and appearing in her husband's play A khasndl oyf shabos. The couple went to Russia as well, where she performed in Dos vaybele. They then went to Argentina and toured with equal success. She played at the Odeon Theater in New York and then went back to Argentina where she performed Spanish songs and appeared in Steinberg's Di Komediantke. In 1932, she performed in London, Paris, Berlin, and Riga, then back to Warsaw. Her most popular character was a "Little Cantor" in Aron Nager's play Dos Khazndl.

In 1937, she played Di zingerin at the Roxbury and then left again for Argentina, where she toured the provinces in Lilian's operetta A shif mit kabtsonim (A ship with paupers) She performed on radio and later on TV, in English, and did some film work at Paramount Studio.

Casman played Pathetic on the TV show The Goldbergs for eight years, reprising the role in the 1950 film, Molly. In 1971-72, she played the role of Sara Gitel in The Laugh Maker with Jacob Jacobs and Leo Fuchs at the Eden Theater in NYC. In 1973, Casman appeared in the film The Mad Adventures of Rabbi Jacob.

In 1982, the musical comedy The Showgirl, which she wrote with Steinberg, was performed by the Shalom Yiddish Musical Comedy Theater at Town Hall starring Mary Soreanu.

Following Steinberg's death in 1938, Casman was married two more times, including to chess master Jacob Bernstein. She died in New York City.
