= Marshall Chess Club =

Chess club in New York City

Coordinates: 40.7341°N 73.9967°W

- Type: USCF Gold Affiliate
- Founded: 1915
- Founder: Frank Marshall
- Location: Greenwich Village, New York City
- Country: United States
- Website: Official Website

The Marshall Chess Club, in the Greenwich Village neighborhood of Manhattan in New York City, is one of the oldest chess clubs in the United States. The club was formed in 1915 by a group of players led by Frank Marshall. It is a nonprofit organization and a gold affiliate of the United States Chess Federation.

== History ==
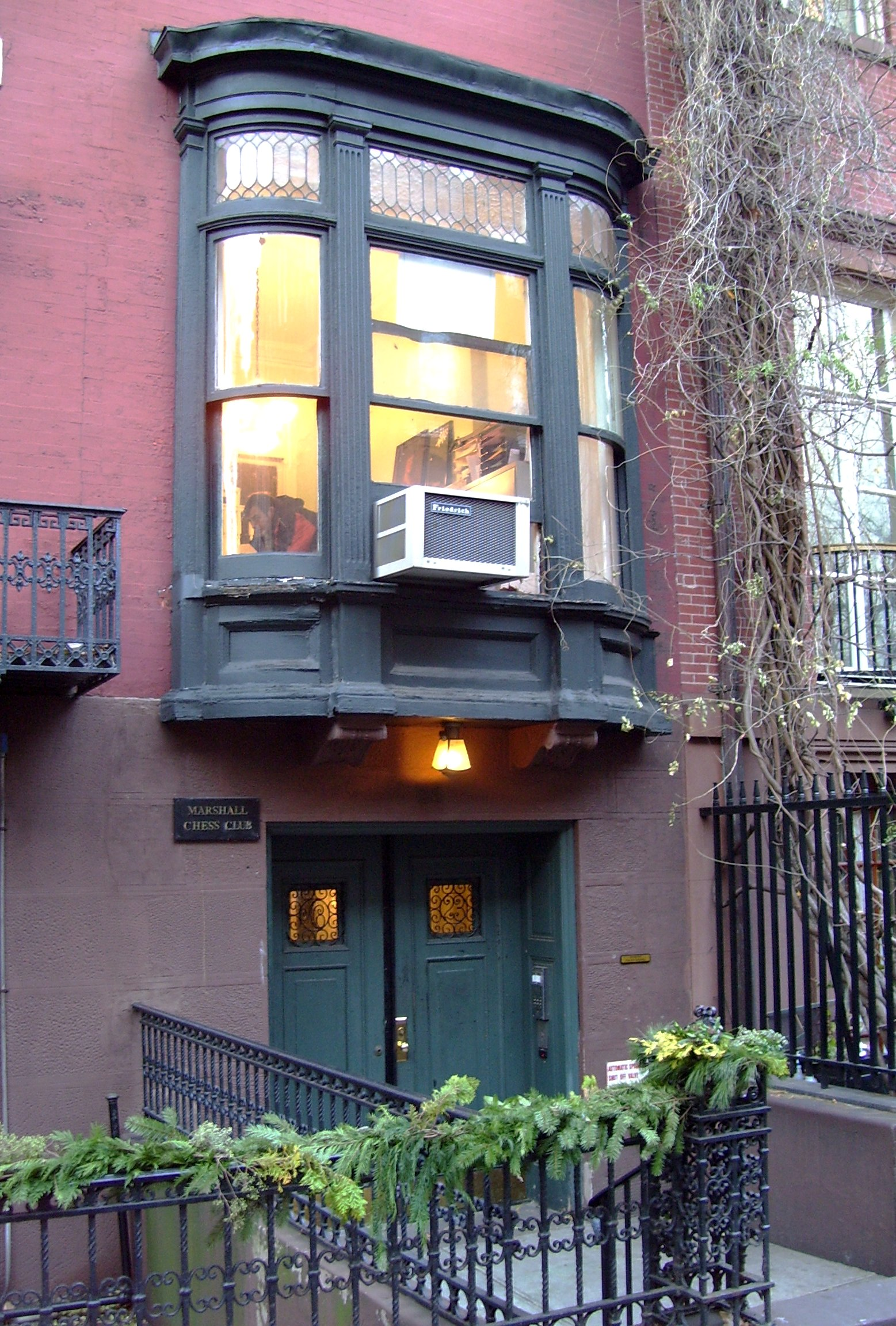
The entrance to the Marshall Chess Club at 23 West Tenth Street, Manhattan

The Marshall Chess Club was a long-time rival of the Manhattan Chess Club, a club which existed from 1877 to 2002. The Marshall Chess Club met in several temporary homes until it moved permanently to 23 West Tenth Street in 1931. The club occupies two floors of a townhouse at that address and owns the building.

Marshall was the leader of the club until his death in 1944, when his wife Caroline took over its leadership. Frank Brady was elected president in 2007, and as of 2026, the current president is Luka Glinsky, and the current vice president is Ken Kubo.

Some notable members of the club have been Fabiano Caruana, Arthur Dake, Larry Evans, Reuben Fine, Bobby Fischer, Stanley Kubrick, Edmar Mednis, Hikaru Nakamura, Fred Reinfeld, Anthony Santasiere, Herbert Seidman, James Sherwin, Albert Simonson, Andy Soltis, Sam Sloan, and Howard Stern. Marcel Duchamp, a modern artist associated with the Dada and Surrealist movements, played for the club after moving to Greenwich Village in the 1940s; his photograph hangs on a wall of the club.

== Tournaments ==
The club has been the site of several rounds of the U.S. Chess Championship. Bobby Fischer played in the 1965 Capablanca Memorial Tournament being held in Havana, Cuba via Teletype from the club with the board being there as well. The Game of the Century also was played there, in 1956 between Bobby Fischer and Donald Byrne. The chess table used for the 2016 World Chess Championship is also in the club and is used as the "top board" in many tournaments.

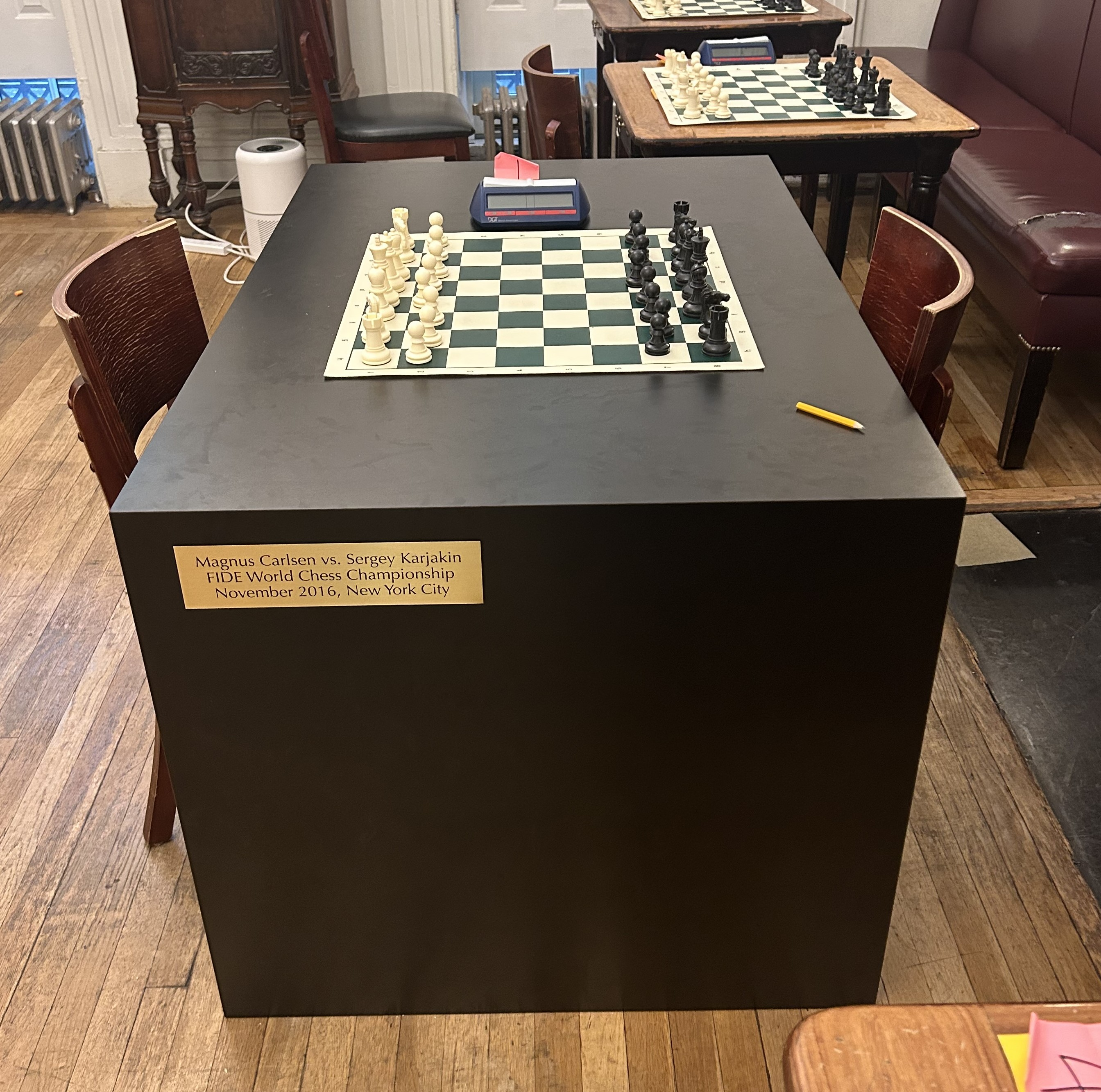
The table used by Magnus Carlsen and Sergey Karjakin in the 2016 World Chess Championship, now housed in Marshall Chess Club.

Daily tournaments are run at the club for both nonmembers and members ranging from weekly blitz tournaments to regular play where games are usually held once a week or over a weekend. These events range from beginner events to FIDE titled events with several titled players. Club members can attend lectures, movie nights, members only tournaments, and a variety of other activities. They also pay less for other events and are entitled to stay at the club when tournaments are not happening on free nights. Notable events yearly include the Marshall International where Grandmaster and International Master norms can be obtained as well as their local club championship with both a titled section and an under 2300 section for untitled players. More recently, the Marshall has switched to an online interface used for tournament registration and for entering results with a small fee for registering late.
