= Jacob Bernstein =

American chess master (1885–1959)

Jacob Bernstein (February 24, 1885 – December 21, 1959) was an American chess master.

Born into a Jewish family in Kaunas, Lithuania, he lived in New York. He won three consecutive New York State Chess Championships (1920–1922), and shared 1st with Herman Steiner in 1929, but lost a tiebreak to him.

He also tied for 8–9th at New York 1913 (Rice tournament, José Raúl Capablanca won), tied for 5–6th at New York 1915 (Capablanca won), tied for 7–8th at New York 1916 (Rice tournament, Capablanca won), and lost a match to Abraham Kupchik (1.5 : 3.5) at New York 1916.

After World War I, he tied for 3–6th at New York 1922 (Edward Lasker won), took 13th at Carlsbad (Karlovy Vary) 1923, and tied for 7–10th at Pasadena 1932 (Alexander Alekhine won).

He married Yiddish stage actress Nellie Casman in 1948, and lived in New York City. They remained married until his death in 1959.
