= Jacob Levin (chess player) =

American chess player (1904–1992)

Jacob Levin (February 18, 1904 – June 17, 1992) was an American chess master.

He reached the best results of his career in Ventnor City. He tied for 2nd–3rd in 1939 (Milton Hanauer won), was a winner in 1941, took second behind Daniel Yanofsky in 1942, tied for 5th–7th in 1943, and won again in 1944. He tied for 8–9th at New York 1942 (US Chess Championship, Samuel Reshevsky and Isaac Kashdan won), and took 4th at New York 1946 (US-ch, Reshevsky won).

Levin was a member of the U.S. reserve team in the famous United States vs. Soviet Union radio match in September 1945.
