= Herbert Seidman =

American chess player (1920–1995)

Herbert Seidman (17 October 1920 – 30 August 1995) was a U.S. Senior Master of chess born in New York City. He played several times in the U.S. Chess Championship. He was known for his swashbuckling-style. He defeated many notable players, including Pal Benko, Arthur Bisguier, Donald Byrne, Arnold Denker, William Lombardy, Edmar Mednis, Samuel Reshevsky, and Jan Timman.

In 1961, Seidman won the most games of any player in the U.S. Championship, but did not win the tournament.

He played on board eight in the famous US vs USSR radio match in September 1945, losing both games to Viacheslav Ragozin.
