= Robert Obojski =

American writer (1929–2020)

- Born: October 19, 1929; Cleveland, Ohio, US
- Died: October 31, 2020 (aged 91); Roslyn, New York, US
- Education: Case Western University
- Known for: Authoring books on baseball, memorabilia, stamps, and coins

Robert Obojski (October 19, 1929 – October 31, 2020) was an American author of over 50 books on baseball, coin and stamp collecting and memorabilia and a numismatist.

== Early life and education ==
Obojski was born October 19, 1929, and grew up in Cleveland, Ohio. He attended Western Reverse University (now Case Western University); he graduated with a BA in History in 1951, an MA in English in 1952, and his Ph.D in 1955 in American Studies. His dissertation was "Robert Grant: Satirist of Old Boston and Intellectual Leader of the New."

== Career ==
Obojski taught at Detroit Institute of Technology (1957–60), Western Kentucky State College (1962–64), Alliance College in Cambridge Springs, Pennsylvania (1964–66, 1967–69), Edinboro University (1966–67), and Delaware State College (1970–72) Full Professor.

Obojski worked as contributing editor for Sports Collectors Digest, Global Stamp News, and Linn's Weekly Stamp News. He was an ongoing contributor to Teddy Bear Review as well as publications from Sterling Publishing.

He had lived in Port Washington, New York and he died in Roslyn, New York.

== Publications ==
His books included the notable Bush League: a History of Minor League Baseball (1975), Great Moments of the Playoffs & World Series (1988), and The Rise of Japanese Baseball Power (1975). He also wrote A First Stamp Album for Beginners (1984, 1st ed.), which was reprinted and revised.

=== Authored ===
- Obojski, Robert (1962). Prodigy at the Piano, The Amazing Story of Frank "Sugarchile" Robinson. Edwards Brothers.
- Obojski, Robert (1970). Ships & Explorers on Coins. New York City, NY: Sterling Publishing Co. Inc. ISBN 978-0806960241.
- Obojski, Robert (1975). Bush League: a History of Minor League Baseball. Macmillan. ISBN 978-0025913004.
- Obojski, Robert (1975). The Rise of Japanese Baseball Power. Chilton Book Co. ISBN 978-0801960611.
- Obojski, Robert (1980). All-Star Baseball Since 1933. Ralph Kiner (forward). New York City, NY: Stein and Day Publishers. ISBN 978-0812826944.
- Obojski, Robert (1981). Poland in Pictures. Visual Geography Series. New York City, NY: Sterling Publishing Co. Inc. ISBN 978-0806911274.
- Obojski, Robert (1984). A First Stamp Album for Beginners (1 ed.). Dover Publications. ISBN 9780486238432.
- Obojski, Robert (1986). Stamp Collector's Price Guide. New York City, NY: Sterling Publishing Co. Inc. ISBN 978-0806947983. This is a pocket-sized reference book.
- Obojski, Robert (1986). Coin Collector's Price Guide (1 ed.). New York City, NY: Sterling Publishing Co. Inc. ISBN 9780806947464.
- Obojski, Robert (1988). Great Moments of the Play Offs and World Series. New York City, NY: Sterling Publishing Co. Inc. ISBN 978-0806941967.
- Obojski, Robert (1989). Baseball's Strangest Moments. New York, NY: Sterling Publishing Co. Inc. ISBN 978-0806969831.
- Obojski, Robert (1989). Baseball Bloopers and Other Curious Incidents. New York City, NY: Sterling Publishing Co. Inc. ISBN 978-0806969824.
- Obojski, Robert (1990). Great Moments of the Playoffs and World Series. New York City, NY: Sterling Publishing Co. Inc. ISBN 978-0806941967.
- Obojski, Robert (1991). Baseball Bloopers and Diamond Oddities. New York City, NY: Sterling Publishing Co. Inc. ISBN 978-0806969817.
- Obojski, Robert (1992). Baseball Memorabilia. New York City, NY: Sterling Publishing Co. Inc. ISBN 978-0806972893.
- Obojski, Robert (1999). Coin Collector's Price Guide. New York City, NY: Sterling Publishing Co. Inc. ISBN 978-0806964973.
- Obojski, Bob (1999). Baseball's Zaniest Moments. New York City, NY: Sterling Publishing Company. ISBN 978-0806937670.

=== Co-authored ===
Other books co-written or edited by Robert Obojski:

- Hobson, Burton; Obojski, Robert (1983). Illustrated Encyclopedia of World Coin. Doubleday. ISBN 978-0385178051.
- Reinfeld, Fred; Hobson, Burton (1986). Catalogue of the World's Most Popular Coins. Robert Obojski (editor) (1 ed.). New York City, NY: Sterling Publishing Co. Inc. ISBN 9780806947402.
- Hobson, Burton H. (1986). Coin Collecting as a Hobby. New York City, NY: Sterling Publishing Co. Inc. ISBN 9780806947495.
- Cayton, Bill; Obojski, Robert (1992). Boxing Memorabilia. New York City, NY: Sterling Publishing Co. Inc. ISBN 9780806985794.
- Forker, Dom; Obojski, Robert; Wayne, Stewart (2004). Big Book of Baseball Brainteasers. Main Street. ISBN 978-1402713378.
- Obojski, Robert; Stewart, Wayne (2006). Out-Of-Left Field Baseball Trivia: Hundreds of Facts & Figures for the Truly Die Hard Fans. New York City, NY: Sterling Publishing Co. Inc. ISBN 978-1402742132.
