= Larry Parr (chess player) =

American chess player (1946–2011)

Lawrence "Larry" Parr (May 21, 1946 – April 2, 2011) was a chess player, author and editor.

Born in 1946 and originally from Bothell, Washington, Parr served from 1985 to 1988 as editor of Chess Life magazine, the official publication of the United States Chess Federation. Later, Parr was the editor of Glasnost magazine, an anti-Soviet periodical. Politically, Parr, known to be a passionate anti-communist ideologue, classified himself as a libertarian.

He was a close friend of Grandmaster Larry Evans and they often collaborated on projects. Parr played relatively little tournament chess, preferring instead to write books about the subject. In 1995, he collaborated with GM Arnold Denker in writing The Bobby Fischer I Knew And Other Stories.

Parr died in 2011 in Malaysia.

== Books ==
- The Bobby Fischer I Knew And Other Stories. ISBN 1-84382-080-3
- Secrets of the Russian Chess Masters: Fundamentals of the Game, Volume 1. ISBN 0-393-32452-4
- Secrets of the Russian Chess Masters: Fundamentals of the Game, Volume 2. ISBN 0-393-32451-6
- Viktors Pupols: American Master. ISBN 0-938650-31-9
- Tan Chin Nam: Never Say I Assume! (ghostwriter for Tan Chin Nam's autobiography). ISBN 983-42884-9-2
