= Manhattan Chess Club =

US chess club (1877–2002)

- Founded: 1877
- Dissolved: 2002
- Location: Manhattan, New York City, New York
- Country: United States

The Manhattan Chess Club in Manhattan, New York City was the second-oldest chess club in the United States (next to the Mechanics' Institute Chess Club in San Francisco) before it closed. The club was founded in 1877 and started with three dozen men, eventually increasing to hundreds, with women allowed as members from 1938. The club moved to several locations over the years. It closed in 2002.

== Notable events ==
The club organized the New York international tournaments of 1924 (won by Emanuel Lasker) and 1927 (won by José Capablanca), frequently hosted rounds of the U.S. Chess Championship starting in the 1930s, and was the site of two World Championship matches in 1886 and 1891.

The club's own championships were some of the strongest tournaments in the United States (Frank Marshall and Isaac Kashdan, both grandmasters, won the championship thrice). Notable participants include Géza Maróczy, who played in several championships and won the Manhattan CC Championship in 1927, Abraham Kupchik, who won the club championship eleven times, Arthur Bisguier, who won seven times, Alexander Kevitz, Arnold Denker, and Walter Shipman, who won six times each, and David Graham Baird and Pal Benko, who won five times each.

Players who developed their skills at the club include Arnold Denker, Arthur Feuerstein, Bobby Fischer, I. A. Horowitz, William Lombardy, Samuel Reshevsky, and Gata Kamsky, who played in numerous tournaments at the club after his defection from the Soviet Union at the 1989 New York Open. In 1970 Fischer played in a blitz tournament organised by the club, scoring 21½/22. Noted midwestern chess master Billy Colias managed the club before his death in 1993.

Former world chess champion José Raúl Capablanca was watching a casual game in the club on 7 March 1942 when he suffered a stroke; he died the next day.

The book entitled, The Bobby Fischer I Knew And Other Stories, by Denker and Larry Parr, contains many stories about the Manhattan Chess Club.

Prior to the advent of internet chess, the club was a primary hub for elite New York City chess and chess tournaments. Its "Four Rated Games Tonight" Thursday evening tournaments in the late 1980s drew large fields that included many titled players, and its overnight "insanity" tournaments, held a few times a year, drew dozens of Saturday night-owls and finished well after dawn on Sunday. Its location on the Tenth Floor of Carnegie Hall was always bustling.

== See also ==
- Marshall Chess Club

== Bibliography ==
- Brady, Frank (2011), Endgame: Bobby Fischer's Rise and Fall - from America's Brightest Prodigy to the Edge of Madness, Crown, ISBN 978-0-307-46390-6
- Golombek, Harry (1977), "Manhattan Chess Club", Golombek's Encyclopedia of Chess, Crown Publishing, ISBN 0-517-53146-1
