= Israel Albert Horowitz =

American chess player

I. A. Horowitz
- Horowitz, photographed c. 1947

Personal information
- Born: Israel Albert Horowitz; November 15, 1907 Brooklyn, New York, U.S.
- Died: January 18, 1973 (aged 65)

Chess career
- Country: United States
- Title: International Master; chess author, columnist, magazine owner

Israel Albert Horowitz (often known as I. A. Horowitz or Al Horowitz) (November 15, 1907 – January 18, 1973) was an American International Master of chess. He is most remembered today for the books he wrote about chess. In 1989, he was inducted into the US Chess Hall of Fame.

== Chess career ==
Horowitz was the chess columnist for The New York Times, writing three columns a week for ten years. He was the owner and editor of Chess Review magazine from 1933 until it was bought out and taken over by the United States Chess Federation in 1969 and merged into Chess Life. Chess Review magazine was founded in 1933 as a partnership between Horowitz and Isaac Kashdan; however, Kashdan dropped out after just a few issues and Horowitz became sole owner. Before that, Horowitz had been a securities trader on Wall Street. He had been partners with chess masters Maurice Shapiro, Mickey Pauley, Albert Pinkus and Maurice Wertheim. Horowitz dropped out and devoted himself to chess, while the others stayed on Wall Street.

Horowitz was a leading player in the U.S. during the 1930s and 1940s. He was U.S. Open Champion in 1936, 1938, and 1943. In 1941, he lost a match (+0−3=13) with Samuel Reshevsky for the U.S. Chess Championship. He played on the U.S. Team in four Chess Olympiads, in 1931, 1935, 1937, and 1950; the first three of which were won by the U.S. In the famous US vs. USSR radio chess match 1945, Horowitz scored one of the only two wins for the U.S. by defeating GM Salo Flohr. He split his "mini-match" of two games against Flohr, and in the 1946 edition of the same event, split his mini-match against Isaac Boleslavsky.

== Horowitz Defense ==
In his book Modern Ideas In The Chess Openings, Horowitz proposed a defense against the Danish Gambit (1.e4 e5 2.d4 exd4 3.c3 dxc3 4.Bc4 cxb2 5.Bxb2). Rather than play the usual 5...d5, Horowitz suggested keeping both pawns and playing 5...c6. This would be followed up by ...d6, ...Nd7, ...Nc5, and ...Be6. Although infrequently played, the defense has not been refuted. Horowitz is credited as the inventor of the defense; it is called Horowitz Defense by GM Nigel Davies in the Foxy Openings DVD Dashing Danish.

== Notable games ==
Position: a8 black rook, e8 black king, f8 black bishop, b7 black pawn, f7 black pawn, c6 black pawn, e6 black queen, f6 black knight, h6 black pawn, a5 black pawn, f5 white knight, h5 white pawn, a4 white pawn, e4 black pawn, g4 black rook, c3 white pawn, e3 white bishop, f3 white queen, b2 white pawn, d2 white rook, f2 white pawn, g2 white pawn, d1 white rook, g1 white king

Position after 25...e4

Horowitz vs. Salo Flohr, US vs. USSR radio chess match 1945:
1. e4 c6 2. d4 d5 3. Nc3 dxe4 4. Nxe4 Nf6 5. Nxf6+ gxf6 6. Ne2 Bf5 7. Ng3 Bg6 8. h4 h6 9. h5 Bh7 10. c3 Qb6 11. Bc4 Nd7 12. a4 a5 13. Qf3 e6 14. 0-0 Bc2 15. Bf4 Bb3 16. Bd3 e5 17. Be3 Bd5 18. Be4 Qb3 19. dxe5 fxe5 20. Rad1 Bxe4 21. Qxe4 Qe6 22. Rd2 Nf6 23. Qf3 Rg8 24. Rfd1 Rg4 25. Nf5 e4 (diagram) Black appears to be winning material, since White's attacked queen has no move that continues to defend the knight on f5. 26. Bb6! A powerful shot, leaving Black with no effective way to stop the threatened mate on d8, e.g. 26...Nd5 27.Qxg4; 26...Be7 27.Qxg4! Nxg4 28.Ng7+ Kf8 29.Nxe6+; or 26...Qc8 27.Nd6+ Bxd6 28.Qxf6 Be7 29.Qh8+ Bf8 30.Rd8+ Qxd8 31.Rxd8+ Rxd8 32.Bxd8 Kxd8 33.Qxf8+. 26... Rxg2+ 27. Qxg2 Qxf5 28. Rd8+ Rxd8 29. Rxd8+ Ke7 30. Qg3 Nd7 31. Bc7 Qd5 32. c4 Qg5 33. Qxg5+ hxg5 34. Ra8 Ke6 35. Bxa5 f5 36. Bc3 f4 37. a5 g4 38. b4 f3 39. Bd2 Kf7 40. Ra7 g3 41. Rxb7 1–0

== Books authored ==
- All About Chess, Collier Books, 1971
- The Best In Chess (with Jack Straley Battell), E.P. Dutton & Co., Inc., 1965. LCCN 65–19965
- Chess for Beginners, Fireside Books, 1950, ISBN 0-671-21184-6
- Chess: Games to Remember, David McKay, 1972. OCLC 309191.
- Chess Openings: Theory and Practice, Fireside Books, 1964 ISBN 0-671-13390-X (hardback) and ISBN 0-671-20553-6 (paperback)
- Chess Opening Traps, Coles Publishing Company Limited, 1979
- Chess Self-Teacher, Harper & Row, 1961, ISBN 978-0-06-092295-5
- Chess Traps, Pitfalls, and Swindles (with Reinfeld), Simon and Schuster, 1954. OCLC 2731999.
- The Complete Book of Chess (with P. L. Rothenberg) Collier-McMillan, 1969. OCLC 59804206.
- First Book of Chess (with Fred Reinfeld), Harper & Row, New York, 1952. ISBN 978-0-389-00225-3.
- The Golden Treasury of Chess, ISBN 0-88365-065-7
- How to Think Ahead in Chess (with Reinfeld), Simon and Schuster, 1951. ISBN 978-0-671-21138-7.
- How to Win At Chess (A complete course with 891 diagrams)
- How to Win in the Chess Endings, ISBN 978-0679140153
- How to Win in the Chess Openings, ISBN 0-671-62426-1
- Learn Chess Quickly, Doubleday, 1973. OCLC 9653926.
- The Macmillan Handbook of Chess (with Reinfeld), Macmillan, 1956. OCLC 1237807.
- New Traps in the Chess Opening, Arco Publishing Company, Inc., 1964. ISBN 0-668-02191-8, LCCN 64-17715.
- The World Chess Championship; a History, Macmillan (US), 1973. OCLC 604994.
  - Also published as From Morphy to Fischer, Batsford (UK), 1973.
- The New York Times Guide to Good Chess, Golden Press, 1969. LCCN 75-85392.

== See also ==
- List of Jewish chess players
