= Larry Evans (chess player) =

American chess grandmaster (1932–2010)

Personal information
- Born: Larry Melvyn Evans; March 22, 1932 New York, New York, U.S.
- Died: November 15, 2010 (aged 78) Reno, Nevada, U.S.

Chess career
- Country: United States
- Title: Grandmaster (1957)
- Peak rating: 2631 (October 1978)
- Peak ranking: No. 30 (January 1977)

Larry Melvyn Evans (March 22, 1932 – November 15, 2010) was an American chess player, author, and journalist who received the FIDE title of Grandmaster (GM) in 1957. He won or shared the U.S. Chess Championship five times and the U.S. Open Chess Championship four times. He wrote a long-running syndicated chess column and wrote or co-wrote more than twenty books on chess.

== Chess career ==
=== Early years ===
Evans was born on March 22, 1932, in Manhattan, the son of Bella (Shotl) and Harry Evans. His family was Jewish. He learned much about the game by playing for ten cents an hour on 42nd Street in New York City, quickly becoming a rising star. At age 14, he tied for 4th–5th place in the Marshall Chess Club championship. The next year he won it outright, becoming the youngest Marshall champion at that time. He also finished equal second in the U.S. Junior Championship, which led to an article in the September 1947 issue of Chess Review. At 16, he played in the 1948 U.S. Chess Championship, his first, tying for eighth place at 11½–7½. Evans tied with Arthur Bisguier for first place in the U.S. Junior Chess Championship of 1949. By age 18, he had won a New York State championship as well as a gold medal in the Dubrovnik 1950 Chess Olympiad. In the latter, his 90% score (eight wins and two draws) on sixth board tied with Rabar of Yugoslavia for the best result of the entire Olympiad.

=== U.S. champion ===
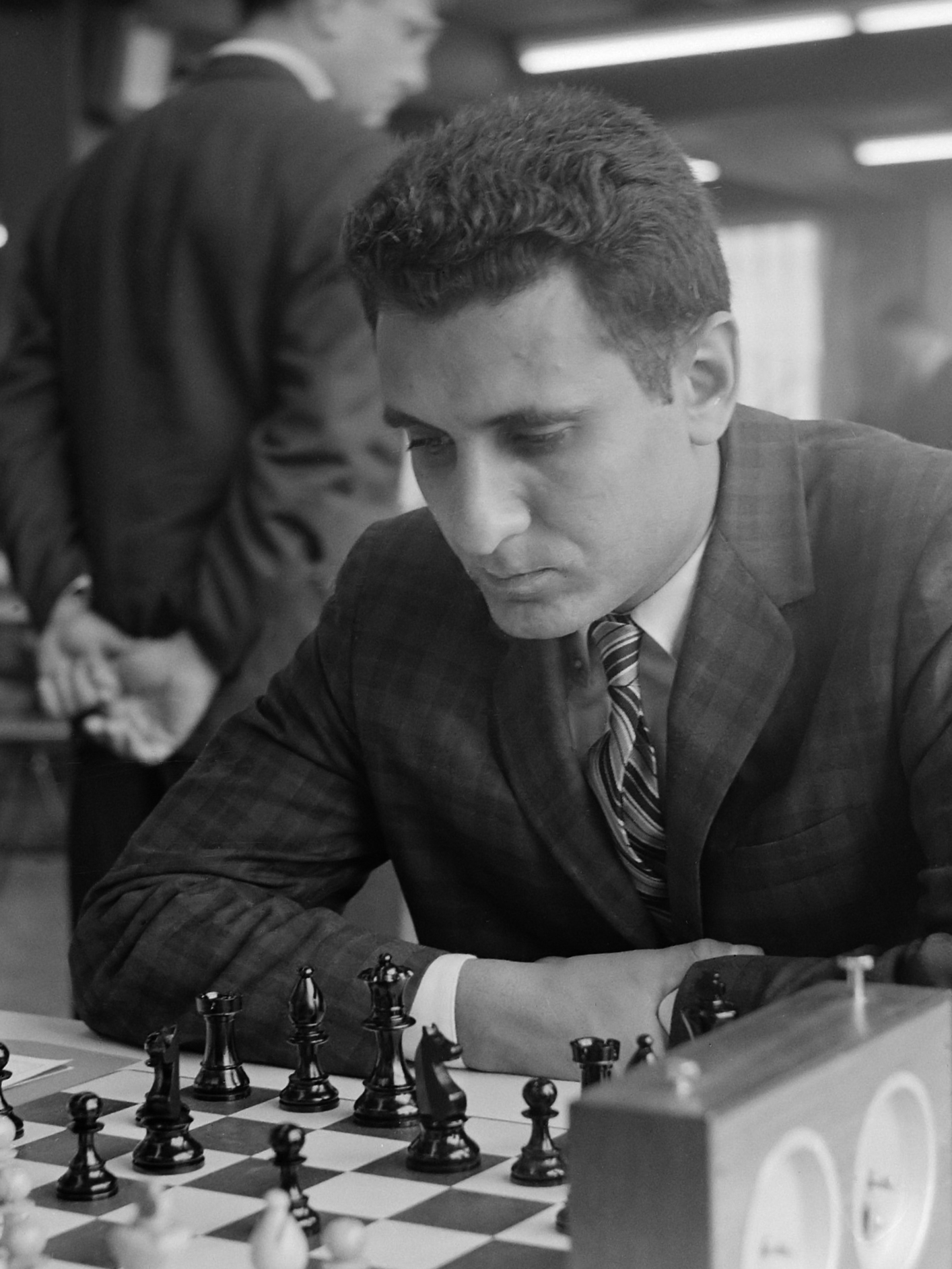
Larry Evans in 1964

In 1951, Evans first won the U.S. Championship, ahead of Samuel Reshevsky, who had tied for 3rd–4th in the 1948 World Championship match-tournament. Evans won his second championship the following year by winning a title match against Herman Steiner. He won the national championship three additional times: in 1961–62, 1967–68, and 1980, the last in a tie with Walter Browne and Larry Christiansen.

=== Grandmaster ===
FIDE awarded Evans the titles of International Master (1952) and International Grandmaster (1957). In 1956 the U.S. State Department appointed him a "chess ambassador".

Evans performed well in many U.S. events during the 1960s and 1970s, but his trips abroad to international tournaments were infrequent and less successful. He won the U.S. Open Chess Championship in 1951, 1952, 1954 (he tied with Arturo Pomar but won the title on the tie-break) and tied with Walter Browne in 1971. He also won the first Lone Pine tournament in 1971.

=== Olympiad successes ===
Evans represented the U.S. in eight Chess Olympiads over a period of twenty-six years, winning gold (1950), silver (1958), and bronze (1976) medals for his play, and participating in team gold (1976) and silver (1966) medals.

=== Best international results ===
Evans' best results on foreign soil included two wins at the Canadian Open Chess Championship, 1956 in Montreal, and 1966 in Kingston, Ontario. He tied for first–second in the 1975 Portimão, Portugal International and for second–third with World Champion Tigran Petrosian, behind Jan Hein Donner, in Venice, 1967. However, Evans' first, and what ultimately proved to be his only, chance in the World Chess Championship cycle ended with a disappointing 14th place (10/23) in the 1964 Amsterdam Interzonal.

At his peak in October 1968 he was rated 2631 by the United States Chess Federation.

=== Working with Bobby Fischer ===
Evans (right) helping Fischer prepare for his World Championship match

He never entered the world championship cycle again, and concentrated his efforts on assisting his fellow American Bobby Fischer in his quest for the world title. He was Fischer's second for the Candidates matches leading up to the World Chess Championship 1972 against Boris Spassky, though not for the championship match itself, after a disagreement with Fischer.

He also wrote the introductions to Fischer's My 60 Memorable Games (1969) and urged Fischer to publish when he had initially been reluctant to do so.

== Chess journalism ==
Evans had always been interested in writing as well as playing. By the age of 18, he had already published David Bronstein's Best Games of Chess, 1944–1949 and the Vienna International Tournament, 1922. His book New Ideas in Chess was published in 1958, and was reprinted in 2011. He wrote or co-wrote more than twenty books on chess.

He wrote the tenth edition of the important openings treatise Modern Chess Openings (1965), co-authored with editor Walter Korn. Some of Evans's other books are Modern Chess Brilliancies (1970), What's The Best Move (1973), and Test Your Chess I.Q. (2001).

Evans began his career in chess journalism during the 1960s, helping to found the American Chess Quarterly, which ran from 1961 to 1965. He was an editor of Chess Digest during the 1960s and 1970s. For over thirty years, until 2006, he wrote a question-and-answer column for Chess Life, the official publication of the United States Chess Federation (USCF), and has also written for Chess Life Online. His weekly chess column, Evans on Chess, has appeared in more than fifty separate newspapers throughout the United States. He also wrote a column for the World Chess Network.

Evans also commentated on some of the most important matches for Time magazine and ABC's Wide World of Sports, including the 1972 Fischer versus Spassky match, the 1993 PCA world title battle between Garry Kasparov and Nigel Short, and the Braingames world chess championship match between Vladimir Kramnik and Kasparov in 2000.

Evans also contributed a large amount of tutorial and other content to the Chessmaster computer game series, most notably an endgame quiz and annotations of classic chess games. He was inducted into the U.S. Chess Hall of Fame in 1994.

=== Criticism of writings ===
Larry Evans was a prolific author, with many who both liked and disliked his works.

Noted chess author and trainer International Master John L. Watson made the following observations on Evans's books and columns: "huge bias"; "long histories of ignoring and distorting evidence" and "Evans' absurd arguments".

By contrast, chess author and International Master Anthony Saidy noted that Evans brought to his journalism a "taste for intriguing chess", his personal experience at "the summit of US chess", and "sharp opinions" regarding the politics of chess, which contributed to his "spicy, concise columns".

Author and USCF National Master Bruce Pandolfini described Larry Evans's New Ideas in Chess as influential and a "first-rate chess book".

Leading chess historian Edward Winter, however, has noted numerous factual errors in Evans' work as well as several examples of possible plagiarism.

On page 175 of Evans' book, Modern Chess Brilliancies, he claims Lodewijk Prins adjourned a clearly lost position against Cuban master Quesada and was lucky enough when the latter died of a heart attack the "next day". Prins noted that he had actually resigned the position, as is proven by the tournament crosstables showing it as a loss for him, and that Quesada played three more games in the tournament before dying five days after the game against Prins. While Evans acknowledged the error, he defended it with "you must admit it makes a good story."

== Death ==
On November 15, 2010, Evans died in Reno, Nevada, from complications following gallbladder surgery.

== Books ==
- New Ideas in Chess (1958). Pitman. ISBN 0-486-28305-4 (1984 Dover edition). Revised edition in 2011, Cardoza Publishing, ISBN 978-1-58042-274-1.
- Modern Chess Openings (1965). 10th edition, revised by Larry Evans, edited by Walter Korn. Pitman Publishing.
- Chess Catechism (1970). Simon & Schuster. ISBN 0-671-20491-2.
- Modern Chess Brilliancies (1970). Fireside Simon & Schuster. ISBN 0-671-22420-4.
- Chess World Championship 1972 (1973) (with Ken Smith). Chess Digest Simon & Schuster. ISBN 0-671-21547-7.
- Evans on Chess (1974). Cornerstone Library.
- What's the Best Move? (1995). ISBN 0-671-51159-9.
- The 10 Most Common Chess Mistakes (1998). ISBN 1-58042-009-5.
- How Good Is Your Chess? (2004). ISBN 1-58042-126-1.
- This Crazy World of Chess (2007). Cardoza Publishing. ISBN 1-58042-218-7.
- Vienna 1922 (2011). Russell Enterprises, Inc.; Reprint edition. ISBN 1-93649-002-1.

== Notable games ==
This game, against future grandmaster Abe Yanofsky, was Evans's first victory against a noted player:

Yanofsky vs. Evans, Corpus Christi 1947

Position: g1 white rook, h2 white king, g2 white pawn, c2 white queen, b2 white pawn, h3 white pawn, f3 white pawn, d3 black rook, c3 white knight, a3 white pawn, f4 black knight, h5 black queen, b5 white pawn, e6 black pawn, h7 black pawn, g7 black pawn, f7 black pawn, c7 black pawn, b7 black pawn, c8 black king

Position after 25.f3

Daniel Yanofsky vs. Evans, U.S. Open 1947; Alekhine Defence (ECO B05)
1.e4 Nf6 2.e5 Nd5 3.d4 d6 4.Nf3 Bg4 5.h3 Bxf3 6.Qxf3 dxe5 7.dxe5 e6 8.a3 Nc6 9.Bb5 Qd7 10.c4 Nde7 11.0-0 Qd4 12.Bg5 a6 13.Bxe7 axb5 14.Bxf8 Rxf8 15.cxb5 Nxe5 16.Qe2 0-0-0 17.Nc3 Ng6 18.Rad1 Qe5 19.Qc2 Rxd1 20.Rxd1 Rd8 21.Rc1 Nf4 22.Kh1 Qh5 24.Kh2 Rd3 25.f3 (see diagram) 25...Rxf3! 26.Rd1 Nxh3! 27.gxf3 Nf2+ 28.Kg3 Qh3+ 29.Kf4 Qh2+ 30.Ke3 0–1

In his book Modern Chess Brilliances, Evans listed four of his own wins:

- Evans vs. Berger, 1964
- Evans vs. Blackstone, 1965
- Evans vs. Zuckerman, 1967 U.S. Championship
- Koehler vs. Evans, 1968 U.S. National Open

== See also ==
- List of Jewish chess players

Achievements
Preceded by Herman Steiner	United States Chess Champion; 1951–54	Succeeded by Arthur Bisguier
Preceded by Bobby Fischer	United States Chess Champion; 1961	Succeeded by Bobby Fischer
Preceded by Bobby Fischer	United States Chess Champion; 1968	Succeeded by Samuel Reshevsky
Preceded by Lubomir Kavalek	United States Chess Champion; 1980 (with Walter Browne and Larry Christiansen)	Succeeded by Walter Browne and Yasser Seirawan
