= Isaac Kashdan =

American chess grandmaster (1905–1985)

Personal information
- Born: November 19, 1905 New York City, New York, U.S.
- Died: February 20, 1985 (aged 79) Los Angeles, California, U.S.

Chess career
- Country: United States
- Title: Grandmaster (1954)

Isaac Kashdan (November 19, 1905, in New York City – February 20, 1985, in Los Angeles) was an American chess grandmaster and chess writer. He was twice U.S. Open champion (1938, 1947). He played five times for the United States in chess Olympiads, winning a total of nine medals, and his Olympiad record is the all-time best among American players.

Kashdan was often called 'der Kleine Capablanca' (German for "The little Capablanca") in Europe because of his ability to extract victories from seemingly even positions. Alexander Alekhine named him one of the most likely players to succeed him as World Champion. Kashdan could not, however, engage seriously in a chess career for financial reasons; his peak chess years coincided with the Great Depression. He resorted to earning a living as an insurance agent and administrator in order to support his family.

== Biography ==
=== Early years ===
Kashdan, who was Jewish, attended CCNY in the 1920s.

=== Olympiad performances ===
He played five times for U.S. team in the Chess Olympiads, with his detailed results below:

- In 1928, he played at first board in 2nd Chess Olympiad in The Hague (+12 –1 =2).
- In 1930, he played at first board in 3rd Chess Olympiad in Hamburg (+12 –1 =4).
- In 1931, he played at first board in 4th Chess Olympiad in Prague (+8 –1 =8).
- In 1933, he played at first board in 5th Chess Olympiad in Folkestone (+7 –1 =6).
- In 1937, he played at third board in 7th Chess Olympiad in Stockholm (+13 –1 =2).

In Stockholm 1937, he scored 14/16, the best individual record of all the players. His all-time Olympic record stands at 79.7% (+52 -5 =22), the best all-time among American players. Kashdan won four team medals: three gold (1931, 1933, 1937), one silver (1928), and five individual medals: two gold (1928, 1937), one silver (1933), and two bronze (1930, 1931).

A table of Olympiad winning percentages places Kashdan fourth of all time among players who have played in the open section of four or more Olympiads, behind only World Champions Mikhail Tal, Anatoly Karpov, and Tigran Petrosian.

=== Excels in Europe and Americas ===
In Frankfurt in 1930, Kashdan took second place (behind Aron Nimzowitsch) and won in Stockholm. He won at Győr 1930 with 8.5/9. In 1930, he defeated Lajos Steiner in a match (+4 -3 =2) in Győr, and lost a match against Gösta Stoltz, (+2 -3 =1), in Stockholm. Kashdan defeated Charles Jaffe by 3–0 in a match at New York 1930.

At New York City 1931, Kashdan took second place with 8.5/11, behind José Raúl Capablanca. At Bled 1931, Kashdan scored 13.5/26 to tie for 4-7th places, as Alekhine scored an undefeated 20.5 points. In 1931/32, at Hastings, Kashdan took second place, behind Salo Flohr, with 7.5/9. In 1932 in Mexico City, he tied for first place with Alekhine with 8.5/9, and took second place behind Alekhine at Pasadena with 7.5/11. At London 1932, Kashdan tied 3rd-4th places with 7.5/11, with Alekhine winning. At Syracuse 1934, Kashdan finished 2nd with 10.5/14, as Samuel Reshevsky won. In the U.S. Open Chess Championship / Western Open, Chicago 1934, Kashdan scored 4.5/9 in the finals, to tie for 5th-6th places, with Reshevsky and Reuben Fine sharing the title. In the U.S. Open Chess Championship (then known as Western Open), Milwaukee 1935, Kashdan placed 3rd with 6.5/10, as Fine won.

=== Wins U.S. Open, frustrated in U.S. Championships ===
Kashdan was U.S. Open Champion in 1938 (jointly with Al Horowitz) at Boston, and in 1947 at Corpus Christi. Kashdan also tied 2nd-4th places in the U.S. Open at Baltimore 1948 with 9/12, half a point behind Weaver Adams.

But Kashdan never won the U.S. (Closed) Championship. Arnold Denker and Larry Parr note this as the central failure of his chess life, since, had he been able to win it, this might have provided him with the financial resources to pursue chess full-time. Denker and Parr state that "from 1928 onwards, Kashdan was clearly the best player in the United States, but the aging Frank Marshall was attached to his title." Kashdan "bargained and haggled with Frank for years until Marshall voluntarily relinquished the crown. The result: the first modern U.S. Championship tournament in 1936. But by this time, (Reuben) Fine and Samuel Reshevsky had surpassed" Kashdan.

In U.S. Championships, Kashdan 1) placed 5th in 1936 at New York with 10/15, with Reshevsky winning 2) placed 3rd in 1938 at New York with Reshevsky repeating; 3) placed 3rd at New York 1940 with 10.5/16, with Reshevsky winning his third straight title; 4) tied for 1st-2nd with Reshevsky at New York 1942 with 12.5/15, but lost the subsequent play-off match (+2 −6 =3) 5) placed 2nd in 1946 at New York City with a strong 14.5/19, 1.5 points behind Reshevsky; 6) tied 1st-2nd in 1948 at South Fallsburg, with Herman Steiner, but again lost the playoff match.

Kashdan would have been U.S. champion in 1942, but lost out to Reshevsky when the Tournament Director, L. Walter Stephens, scored Reshevsky's time-forfeit loss to Denker as a win instead.

=== Wartime years ===
Kashdan drew 5–5 in a match against Horowitz at New York City 1938. With the arrival of World War II in 1939, competitive chess was significantly reduced. Kashdan won at Havana 1940 with 7.5/9. Kashdan tied 2nd-4th in the New York State Championship, Hamilton 1941, with 7/10, with Fine winning. Kashdan lost both of his games against Alexander Kotov in the 1945 radio match against the USSR, a match which marked the definitive shift in world chess power to the Soviet Union. At Hollywood 1945, Kashdan placed 5th with 7/12, as Reshevsky won.

=== After the war ===
The American team traveled to Moscow in 1946 for a rematch against the Soviet team, and Kashdan partially avenged his result against Kotov from the previous year, winning 1.5-0.5. In a Master event organized by the Manhattan Chess Club in 1948, Kashdan scored 5.5/7 to place 2nd behind George Kramer. But in the 1948 New York International, Kashdan made just 4/9 for a tied 7-8th place, with Fine winning. In the U.S. Open Chess Championship, Fort Worth 1951, Kashdan scored 8/11, with Larry Evans winning. At Hollywood 1952, Kashdan scored 4/9 for 7th place, with Svetozar Gligorić winning. Kashdan's final competitive event was the 1955 match in Moscow against the USSR, where he scored 1.5/4 against Mark Taimanov.

He appeared on February 9, 1956, TV edition of Groucho Marx's show You Bet Your Life, where the host referred to him throughout as "Mr. Ashcan", and challenged him to a match for $500 (but only if allowed to cheat). Kashdan and his partner, Helen Schwartz (mother of actor Tony Curtis) won $175.

=== Organizer, arbiter, writer ===
Kashdan was awarded the Grandmaster title in 1954, and the International Arbiter title in 1960. Kashdan captained the American Olympiad team for Leipzig 1960 to a silver medal finish. Brady praised Kashdan's contribution: "Possibly the most valuable member was a non-player, Isaac Kashdan. As team captain, he brought to our players an incomparable knowledge not only of the complications of international team chess, but also of the zest and confidence of the Thirties that had seen him front and center in an unbroken succession of American victories."

In 1933, Kashdan, in partnership with Horowitz, founded Chess Review, a magazine that was purchased by the United States Chess Federation in 1969. He edited the tournament book for the 1966 Piatigorsky Cup tournament.

Kashdan was the longtime editor of the Los Angeles Times chess column, from 1955 until 1982, when he suffered a disabling stroke.

In his role as an arbiter, he directed many chess tournaments, including the two Piatigorsky Cup tournaments of 1963 (at Los Angeles) and 1966 (at Santa Monica). Kashdan also helped to organize the series of Lone Pine tournaments in the 1970s, which were sponsored by Louis Statham. Kashdan was later involved in administration in the United States Chess Federation, serving as a vice-president.

== Style and assessment ==
Denker and Parr write that Kashdan was a powerful tactician, but that his real strength was in the endgame, and that he was very strong with the two bishops. However, Grandmaster Denker also pointed out that "the slightest touch of rigidity" occasionally crept into Kashdan's play, as he sometimes resorted to artificial maneuvers to obtain the two bishops. Lack of top-class practice after the mid-1930s, due to economic imperatives, led to Kashdan's gradual slide from the elite.

== Family ==
One of Kashdan's children had serious health problems, and the family moved to California in the 1940s, because of its better climate.

The hacker and phreak "Mark Bernay", whose real name is Richard Kashdan, is speculated to be his son.

== Quotes ==
It has never been a disgrace to lose to Kashdan.

— IGM Arnold Denker, If You Must Play Chess, 1947

== See also ==
- List of Jewish chess players
