= Salo Flohr =

Czech chess grandmaster and writer (1908–1983)

Salomon Flohr
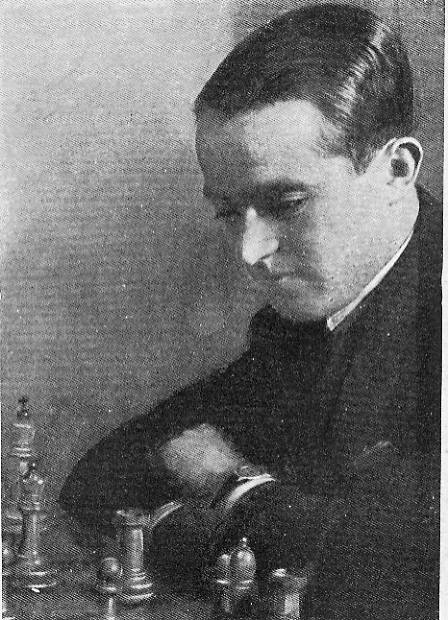
- Salomon Flohr in Moscow, 1933.

Personal information
- Born: Salomon Mikhailovich Flohr; November 21, 1908 Horodenka, Austria-Hungary
- Died: July 18, 1983 (aged 74) Moscow, Russian SFSR, Soviet Union

Chess career
- Country: Czechoslovakia; Soviet Union
- Title: Grandmaster (1950)
- Peak rating: 2460 (July 1972)

Salomon Mikhailovich Flohr (November 21, 1908 – July 18, 1983) was a Czechoslovak and Soviet chess player and writer. He was among the first recipients of the title International Grandmaster from FIDE in 1950. Flohr dominated many tournaments of the pre-World War II years, and by the late 1930s was considered a contender for the World Championship. However, his patient, positional style was overtaken by the sharper, more tactical methods of the younger Soviet echelon after World War II.

== Early life ==
Flohr had a troubled childhood beset by personal crises. He was born in a Jewish family in Horodenka in what was then Galicia, Austria-Hungary (now in Ukraine). He and his brother were orphaned during World War I when their parents were killed in a massacre, and they fled to the newly formed nation of Czechoslovakia.

Flohr settled in Prague, gradually acquiring a reputation as a skilled chess player by playing for stakes in the city's many cafés. During 1924, he participated in simultaneous exhibitions by Richard Réti and Rudolf Spielmann, and he was still giving displays well into his seventies.

== Early successes ==
Flohr won the Kautsky Memorial tournaments of 1928 and 1929 which were held in Prague, and made his international debut at the Rohitsch-Sauerbrunn (Rogaška Slatina) tournament in Slovenia, where he finished second to Akiba Rubinstein in the latter's final success. Flohr had also taken a job as a chess journalist; one of his first assignments was to cover the 1928 Berlin tournament, during which he continued to win money on the side by playing chess.

== World title contender ==
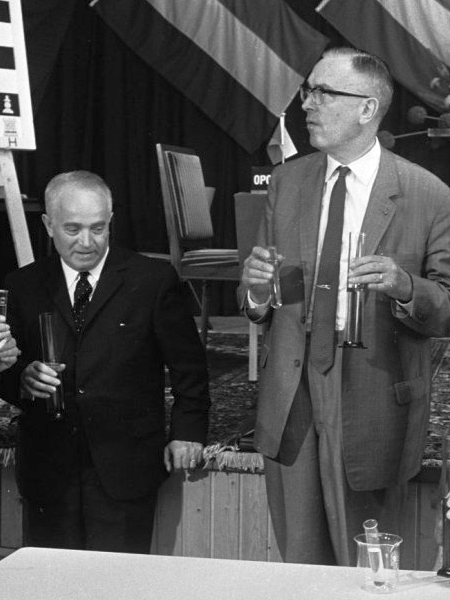
Flohr (left) with Max Euwe, 1969

Flohr's playing ability peaked in the mid-1930s, when he became one of the world's strongest players and a leading contender for the World Championship. He became champion of Czechoslovakia in 1933 and 1936 and played in many tournaments throughout Europe, generally finishing amongst the top three. Notable victories were at Bad Sliač in 1932, where he shared first place with Milan Vidmar; Scheveningen in 1933; Bad Liebenwerda in 1934 with 9½/11; Barcelona in 1935 where he tied for first with George Koltanowski; Moscow 1935 where he tied for first place with future World Champion Mikhail Botvinnik; Poděbrady in 1936 with the score of +10 −1 =6; and Kemeri in 1937 where he shared the top spot with Vladimir Petrov and Samuel Reshevsky. During this period, he had several other notable high finishes, such as Bern 1932 (tied for second with 11½/15, after World Champion Alexander Alekhine); Zürich 1934 (tied for second with 12/15, again trailing Alekhine); and Pärnu 1937 (second behind Paul Felix Schmidt).

Flohr also frequently visited England, regularly playing in the Hastings tournaments of the 1930s. He finished first in 1931/32, 1932/33 and 1933/34, he finished in a tie for first place with Max Euwe and Sir George Thomas in 1934/35, and he was second behind Reuben Fine in 1935/36. He also won the Margate tournament of 1936 ahead of former World Champion José Raúl Capablanca.

Flohr became a national hero in Czechoslovakia during the 1930s. His name was used to sell many of the luxury products of the time, including Salo Flohr cigarettes, slippers and eau-de-cologne.

== Excels in Chess Olympiads ==
His form for his adopted country in the Chess Olympiads was equally impressive, according to the comprehensive Olympiad site olimpbase.org. He made his debut at Hamburg 1930 on board one, scoring 14½/17 for the silver medal. On home soil at Prague 1931, again on board one, he scored 11/18, and led Czechoslovakia to a team bronze medal. At Folkestone 1933, he again played board one, scored 9/14, helped Czechoslovakia win the team silver medal, and earned a bronze medal for himself. At Warsaw 1935, on board one he scored an undefeated 13/17 for another individual gold medal, and Czechoslovakia finished fifth. Then at Stockholm 1937, once again on board one, he scored 12½/16 for a third individual gold medal. In five Olympiads, he won two individual gold medals, a silver and a bronze. His aggregate was 60/82, for a 73% score against the top players in the world.

== Match results ==
Flohr enjoyed a fair amount of success in match play. He played matches with two of his main rivals for the right to challenge reigning champion Alexander Alekhine. He tied a 16-game match against Euwe in 1932 (+3 −3 =10), and he tied a match against Botvinnik in 1933 (+2 −2 =8). Flohr beat Gösta Stoltz by 5½–2½ in 1931, and a year later he beat Sultan Khan, the 1932 and 1933 British Champion, by 3½–2½. Flohr also defeated Johannes van den Bosch at The Hague in 1932 by 6–2. In 1933, he won two matches in Switzerland, first over Oskar Naegeli by 4–2 at Bern, and then by 4½–1½ over Henri Grob at Arosa.

== Official challenger, war years ==
Flohr had married in 1935. By 1937, FIDE had nominated him as the official candidate to play Alekhine for the World Championship. However, with World War II looming, it proved impossible for Flohr to raise the stake money in Czechoslovakia, so the plans were dropped. The next year, Flohr was one of the eight elite players invited to the great AVRO tournament of November 1938. He finished last, and this put an end to his chances of a World Championship match with Alekhine. AVRO may have been the only time in chess history when the top eight players in the world contested an important tournament.

While AVRO was a strong tournament and Flohr's last-placed finish was no disgrace, his result may also be explained by his difficult personal circumstances at the time. The German invasion of Czechoslovakia in 1938 had left Flohr, as a Polish-Ukrainian Jew, in grave personal danger. Flohr remained in the Netherlands in early 1939, playing in several small events. He tied for first place in Amsterdam KNSB with Max Euwe and László Szabó at 3½/5. He tied third/fourth place in Amsterdam VARA with 3/5, as Euwe and Salo Landau won. He won Baarn I with 2½/3. Then, he and his family fled, first to Sweden, and then to Moscow with the help of his friend Botvinnik. While in Sweden, he tied for first place at Gothenburg with Rudolf Spielmann with 10 points out of 11.

== Soviet citizen, recovers form ==
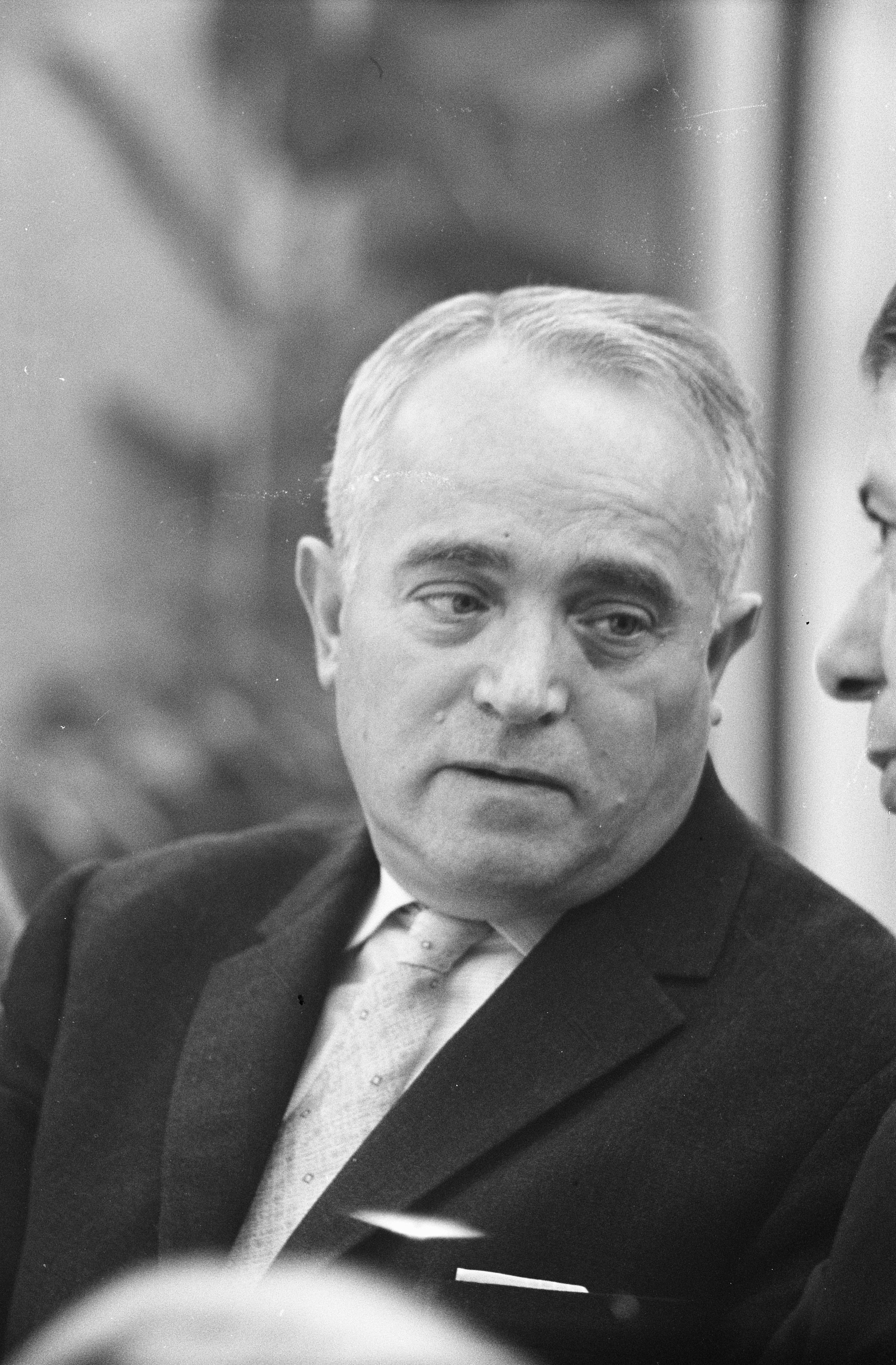
Flohr (1963)

Flohr was able to recover his form after reaching safety in Moscow. He won Kemeri 1939 with a score of 12/15. He also won the strong 1939 Leningrad/Moscow tournament with 12/17. He tied for second place at Margate 1939 with 6½/9 behind Paul Keres. He then tied for second at Bournemouth 1939 with 8½/11, behind former World Champion Euwe.

Flohr did not play in any official strong Soviet events from 1940–42, though he did lose a 1942 match to Vladimir Makogonov in Baku by 2–0. He became a naturalized Soviet citizen in 1942, and developed his writing career in his new country, contributing articles to Soviet newspapers and magazines including Ogonek. As the Soviet Union first stopped then reversed the Axis invasion, some chess activity started up again, and in 1943 Flohr won a small but strong tournament in Baku. In 1944 he was again victorious in a Bolshevik Society tournament at Kiev, tied with Alexei Sokolsky. He withdrew from the 1945 USSR Championship after only three games.

After the war, he was still a contender for a possible World Championship match. He finished 6th at the 1948 Interzonal in Saltsjöbaden, thereby qualifying for the 1950 Candidates Tournament in Budapest. However, he finished joint last with 7 out of 18, and never entered the World Championship cycle again, concentrating on journalism. He also developed a role as a chess organiser. He did play periodically at high levels, both within the Soviet Union and abroad, with some success, until the late 1960s. He was awarded the title of International Arbiter in 1963.

Flohr died in Moscow on July 18, 1983.

== Achievements and legacy ==
Flohr was one of Czechoslovakia's greatest chess players ever and proved virtually invincible at the Olympiads of the 1930s. His tournament record was impressive, with his tactical skill and excellent endgame technique securing him many famous victories. FIDE awarded him the International Grandmaster title on its inaugural list in 1950. He made some important contributions to opening theory: a 'Flohr variation' can be found in six major openings, including the Caro–Kann Defence, the Ruy Lopez, the English Opening, and the Grünfeld Defence. The Flohr–Zaitsev Variation of the Closed Ruy Lopez (1.e4 e5 2.Nf3 Nc6 3.Bb5 a6 4.Ba4 Nf6 5.0-0 Be7 6.Re1 b5 7.Bb3 d6 8.c3 0-0 9.h3 Bb7 10.d4 Re8) was successfully adopted by World Champion Anatoly Karpov in the 1980s.

Flohr was primarily a strategist who excelled in the endgame. He favoured the closed game with White, and during the prime of his career, he was especially deadly with the Queen's Gambit, as the game selection shows. Flohr almost never opened with 1.e4. He was one of the main developers of the Caro–Kann, which was an obscure and poorly regarded line as late as the 1920s when Flohr adopted it.

The Second World War killed any chance he had of winning the world title, and the stress of becoming a refugee for the second time in his life affected his style of play. He became a much more cautious player in his post-war games and earned a drawish reputation, with many short draws which were hardly contested. Players such as Vasily Smyslov, David Bronstein, Isaac Boleslavsky, Paul Keres, Alexander Kotov, Tigran Petrosian, Efim Geller, Mark Taimanov, Yuri Averbakh, Boris Spassky, Mikhail Tal, Viktor Korchnoi, and Leonid Stein dominated the landscape with their sharper styles and innovative openings.

Flohr was never able to defeat Alekhine head-to-head, losing five games and drawing seven in their 12 encounters. Alekhine had a sharp, tactical style, and he could also play outstanding positional chess.

According to the site Chessmetrics.com, which compares historical ratings, Flohr was among the world's top 20 players from 1930 to 1951, except for the war years 1942–44 when he was largely inactive; and his ranking peaked at No. 2 in the world in 1935.

== Notable games ==
- Salo Flohr vs Max Euwe, Amsterdam / Karlsbad match 1932, Queen's Gambit, Exchange Variation (D36), 1–0 Virtually perfect game by White showing optimal strategy in this variation.
- Mikhail Botvinnik vs Salo Flohr, Leningrad / Moscow match 1933, Caro–Kann Defence, Panov–Botvinnik Attack (B13), 0–1 Botvinnik adopts his favourite line, but has to concede defeat.
- Salo Flohr vs Isaac Kashdan, Folkestone Olympiad 1933, English Opening, Flohr–Mikenas Attack (A18), 1–0 Flohr adopts one of the lines which will eventually bear his name, with good success here.
- Salo Flohr vs Paul Keres, Warsaw Olympiad 1935, Queen's Gambit Declined, Exchange Variation (D37), 1–0 Keres was the 19-year-old new star making his international debut, but he is out of his league here.
- Salo Flohr vs J.R. Capablanca, Nottingham 1936, Queen's Gambit Declined, Tartakower Variation (D59), 1–0 Even the phenomenal Capablanca, former World Champion and joint winner of Nottingham, can't defend against Flohr's Queen's Gambit.
- Salo Flohr vs Emanuel Lasker, Moscow 1936, Reti Opening (A06), 1–0 Solid positional performance in one of the fashionable hypermodern variations.
- David Bronstein vs Salo Flohr, USSR Championship, Moscow 1944, Ruy Lopez, Open Variation (C82), 0–1 The 20-year-old Bronstein was making his debut at the top Soviet level, but learns a lesson here.
- Salo Flohr vs Tigran Petrosian, USSR Championship, Moscow 1949, Old Indian Defence (A54), 1–0 The 20-year-old Petrosian was making his debut at the top Soviet level, and learns a positional lesson.
- Salo Flohr vs Efim Geller, USSR Championship, Moscow 1950, Reti Opening (A05), 1–0 Another young Master learns that the veteran Flohr still packs a punch.
- Leonid Stein vs Salo Flohr, Ukrainian Championship, Kiev 1957, Caro–Kann Defence, Flohr–Smyslov Modern Variation (B17), 0–1 Another smooth positional massage from the Master of the 'Roach'.
- Salo Flohr vs Bent Larsen, Noordwijk 1965, Sicilian Defence, Accelerated Dragon Variation (B39), 1–0 Flohr takes off one of the Candidates of that time in his last great victory.

== Writings and further reading ==
- 12th Chess Tournament of Nations [Moscow 1956 Olympiad], by Salomon Flohr, Moscow, Fiskultura i Sport, 1957 (Russian).
- Salo Flohr's Best Games of Chess, by Salomon Flohr (translated from the Russian by Gregory S. Donges), Davenport, Iowa, Thinker's Press, 1985, ISBN 0-938650-34-3.
- Grandmaster Flohr, by Viktor D. Baturinsky (Hg), Moscow, Fiskultura i Sport, 1985 (Russian).
- Salo Flohr und das Schachleben in der Tschechoslawakei, by Helmut Wieteck, Hamburg, Neu-Jung Verlag, 2005, ISBN 3-933648-26-2 (German).
- Schackmästare utan hemland, by Henrik Malm Lindberg, Stockholm, Personhistorisk Tidskrift, 2020, (Swedish).

== See also ==
- List of Jewish chess players
