= Arnold Denker =

American chess grandmaster (1914–2005)

- Denker in 2004

Personal information
- Born: February 21, 1914 New York City, U.S.
- Died: January 2, 2005 (aged 90) Fort Lauderdale, Florida, U.S.

Chess career
- Country: United States
- Title: International Master (1950); Grandmaster (honorary, 1981)
- Peak rating: 2340 (July 1978)

Arnold Sheldon Denker (February 21, 1914 – January 2, 2005) was an American chess player and author. He was U.S. champion in 1944 and 1946. In later years he served in various chess organizations, receiving recognition from the United States Chess Federation, including in 2004 the highest honor, "Dean of American Chess".

== Early life and education ==
Denker was born on February 21, 1914, in the Bronx, New York City, in an Orthodox Jewish family. According to Denker himself, he learned chess in 1923 watching his elder brothers play, but took up the game seriously only in his freshman year in Theodore Roosevelt High School, where his schoolmates played for a nickel a game in the cafeteria; after regularly losing his milk money, Denker discovered Emanuel Lasker's Common Sense in Chess in the school library, studied it, and soon "the nickels came pouring back with interest".

Denker was a promising boxer in his early years. He first gained attention in chess by winning the New York City individual interscholastic championship in 1929 at age 15.

Denker graduated from New York University in the 1930s.

== Career ==
=== Pre-war and World War II years ===
Denker (1946)

In the next decade, he established himself as a leading rival to Samuel Reshevsky, Reuben Fine, and Isaac Kashdan as the strongest U.S. chess player. His first really strong international event was Syracuse, New York 1934, where Reshevsky won convincingly, with Denker placing just behind him.

In 1940, Denker won the first of his six Manhattan Chess Club championships. He became U.S. Champion in 1944, winning fourteen games (including one against Fine), drawing three, and losing none. Denker called his win over Fine from this event "the game of my life". This 91% score was the best winning percentage in U.S. Championship history until Bobby Fischer scored 11–0 in 1963–64. Denker successfully defended his U.S. title in a 1946 challenge match against Herman Steiner, winning 6–4 at Los Angeles.

In addition, during World War II Denker played exhibitions at army bases and aboard aircraft carriers. In 1945, as U.S. champion, he played on board one in the US vs USSR radio match, losing both games to Mikhail Botvinnik, and in 1946 travelled to Moscow for the return match, losing both games against Vasily Smyslov. Also in 1946, he played at the very strong Groningen tournament, the first major event following World War II, scoring 9.5 out of 19 and securing draws against Botvinnik and Smyslov, and losing after achieving a winning position against Max Euwe. David Hooper and Ken Whyld suggest that Denker may have been unfortunate in that his best years came during World War II, when very little competitive chess was being played.

Denker was never a full-time professional player, as such is now understood. His peak results were scored from 1940 to 1947, in U.S. Championships and on his trips to Europe for tournaments at London, Hastings and Groningen. In 1947 Denker produced an autobiographical game collection in his book: If You Must Play Chess.

International ratings were introduced by FIDE only in 1970, more than a generation after Denker's best years. The website chessmetrics.com retrospectively places Denker as high as 27th in the world in the mid 1940s, but this site is missing several of Denker's most important results.

Denker became an International Master in 1950, the year the title was first awarded by FIDE.

=== Later life ===
In 1981 FIDE made Denker an honorary Grandmaster. In later years, he was an important chess organizer, serving on the boards of the American Chess Foundation, the United States Chess Federation (USCF), and the U.S. Chess Trust – the driving force behind the prestigious Denker Tournament of High School Champions (named in his honor). He also served as a FIDE official. Denker also continued to play chess, though at well below his earlier strength. (His last FIDE rating was 2293.) He wrote many chess articles, and in 1995 he and Larry Parr co-authored, The Bobby Fischer I Knew and Other Stories.

In 1992 Denker was inducted into the U.S. Chess Hall of Fame. He received America's highest chess honor on June 11, 2004, when he became only the third person to be proclaimed "Dean of American Chess" by the USCF.

== Sample game ==
Denker vs. Feit, 1929

Position: a8 black rook, b8 black knight, d8 black queen, a7 black pawn, c7 black pawn, g7 black pawn, h7 white bishop, b6 black pawn, d6 black pawn, h6 black bishop, d5 white pawn, g5 black king, c4 white pawn, e4 white queen, g3 white pawn, h3 black bishop, a2 white pawn, b2 white pawn, h2 white pawn, f1 white rook, h1 white king

Final position after 23.Bg6–h7

The following is Denker's favorite game, a brilliancy he played at age 15:

Denker–Feit, New York 1929 Dutch Defense
1. d4 f5 2. Nf3 e6 3. g3 b6 4. Bg2 Bb7 5. 0-0 Nf6 6. c4 Be7 7. Nc3 d6 8. d5 e5 9. Ng5 Bc8 10. e4 0-0 11. f4 exf4 12. Bxf4 fxe4 13. Ncxe4 Nxe4 14. Bxe4 Bxg5 15. Qh5 Rxf4 16. Qxh7+ Kf7 17. Bg6+ Kf6 18. Rxf4+ Bxf4 19. Qh4+ Bg5 20. Qe4 Be3+ 21. Kh1 Bh3 22. Rf1+ Kg5 23. Bh7 1-0

== Books ==
- Denker, Arnold (1947). If You Must Play Chess. Philadelphia, PA: David McKay (PRH).
- Denker, Arnold & Parr, Larry (1995). The Bobby Fischer I Knew And Other Stories. San Francisco, CA: Hypermodern Press. ISBN 1-886040-18-4.

== Personal life ==
Denker married the former Nina Simmons in 1936, a marriage that lasted 57 years, until her death in 1993. The Denkers had three children: Richard, Mitchell and Randie.

Denker died of brain cancer on January 2, 2005, in Fort Lauderdale, Florida.

== See also ==
- List of Jewish chess players

Achievements
Preceded by Samuel Reshevsky	United States Chess Champion; 1944–1946	Succeeded by Samuel Reshevsky
