= 1951 USSR Chess Championship =

Soviet chess tournament

19th Soviet Chess Championship (1951)
- Location: Moscow

Champion
- Paul Keres

The 1951 Soviet Chess Championship was the 19th edition of USSR Chess Championship. Held from 11 November to 14 December 1951 in Moscow. The tournament was won by Paul Keres. The final were preceded by quarter-finals events and four semifinals (at Leningrad, Baku, Sverdlovsky and Lvov).

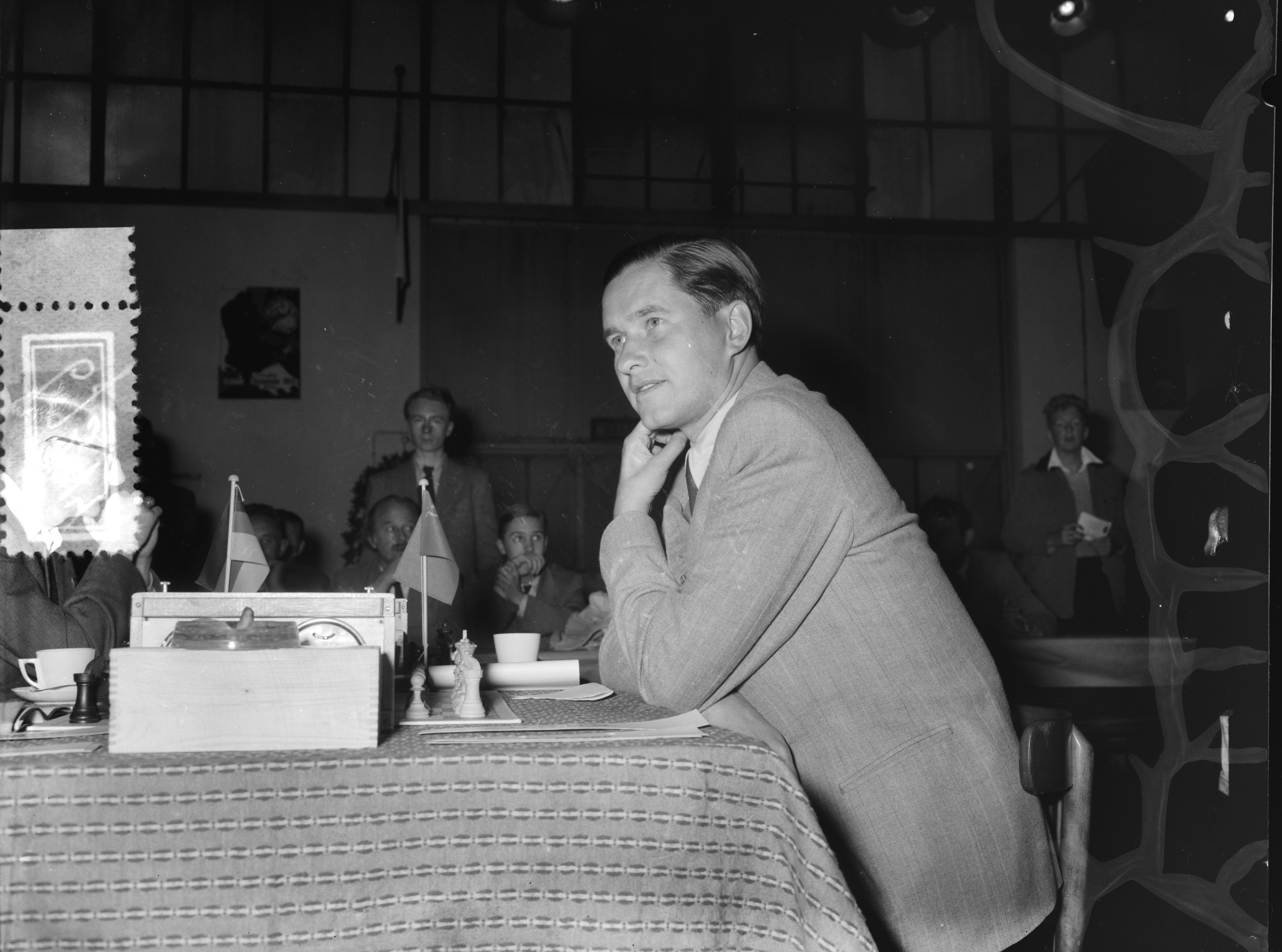
Paul Keres

== Table and results ==
19th Soviet Chess Championship (1951)
	Player	1	2	3	4	5	6	7	8	9	10	11	12	13	14	15	16	17	18	Total
1	(Soviet Union) Paul Keres	-	½	1	1	½	½	½	1	½	1	0	0	½	1	1	1	1	1	12
2	(Soviet Union) Tigran Petrosian	½	-	½	1	½	½	½	1	½	0	0	1	1	1	½	1	1	1	11½
3	(Soviet Union) Efim Geller	0	½	-	0	1	½	0	1	0	1	1	1	½	1	1	1	1	1	11½
4	(Soviet Union) Vassily Smyslov	0	0	1	-	1	0	1	1	1	½	1	½	½	1	½	1	0	1	11
5	(Soviet Union) Mikhail Botvinnik	½	½	0	0	-	½	1	½	½	1	0	½	½	½	1	1	1	1	10
6	(Soviet Union) Yuri Averbakh	½	½	½	1	½	-	0	0	½	1	½	½	1	½	½	0	1	1	9½
7	(Soviet Union) David Bronstein	½	½	1	0	0	1	-	1	½	0	1	0	½	½	½	½	1	1	9½
8	(Soviet Union) Mark Taimanov	0	0	0	0	½	1	0	-	½	½	1	½	1	½	1	1	1	1	9½
9	(Soviet Union) Salo Flohr	½	½	1	0	½	½	½	½	-	0	½	1	½	½	1	½	0	1	9
10	(Soviet Union) Lev Aronin	0	1	0	½	0	0	1	½	1	-	1	½	0	½	½	1	1	½	9
11	(Soviet Union) Nikolai Kopilov	1	1	0	0	1	½	0	0	½	0	-	0	1	1	0	1	1	½	8½
12	(Soviet Union) Alexander Kotov	1	0	0	½	½	½	1	½	0	½	1	-	½	½	½	0	1	0	8
13	(Soviet Union) Igor Bondarevsky	½	0	½	½	½	0	½	0	½	1	0	½	-	½	1	0	1	1	8
14	(Soviet Union) Vladimir Simagin	0	0	0	0	½	½	½	½	½	½	0	½	½	-	1	½	1	1	7½
15	(Soviet Union) Oleg Moiseev	0	½	0	½	0	½	½	0	0	½	1	½	0	0	-	½	1	1	6½
16	(Soviet Union) Isaac Lipnitsky	0	0	0	0	0	1	½	0	½	0	0	1	1	½	½	-	½	1	6½
17	(Soviet Union) Nikolay Novotelnov	0	0	0	1	0	0	0	0	1	0	0	0	0	0	0	½	-	½	3
18	(Soviet Union) Evgeny Terpugov	0	0	0	0	0	0	0	0	0	½	½	1	0	0	0	0	½	-	2½
