= 1950 USSR Chess Championship =

Soviet chess tournament

18th Soviet Chess Championship (1950)
- Location: Moscow

Champion
- Paul Keres

The 1950 Soviet Chess Championship was the 18th edition of USSR Chess Championship. Held from 10 November to 12 December 1950 in Moscow. The tournament was won by Paul Keres. Keres, Isaac Boleslavsky and Smyslov entered the final directly. The final were preceded by seven quarter-finals and five semifinals (at Leningrad, Tula, Tartu, Kiev and Gorky).

== Table and results ==
18th Soviet Chess Championship (1950)
	Player	1	2	3	4	5	6	7	8	9	10	11	12	13	14	15	16	17	18	Total
1	(Soviet Union) Paul Keres	-	½	½	1	½	½	0	1	1	1	1	0	½	1	½	1	½	1	11½
2	(Soviet Union) Isaac Lipnitsky	½	-	½	1	0	1	0	½	1	½	½	1	½	1	0	1	1	1	11
3	(Soviet Union) Alexander Tolush	½	½	-	0	1	½	1	½	0	1	1	0	½	1	1	½	1	1	11
4	(Soviet Union) Lev Aronin	0	0	1	-	1	0	½	1	0	1	1	1	½	½	1	½	1	1	11
5	(Soviet Union) Alexander Konstantinopolsky	½	1	0	0	-	½	½	1	½	½	½	½	½	1	1	½	1	½	10
6	(Soviet Union) Vassily Smyslov	½	0	½	1	½	-	½	0	½	½	1	½	1	½	1	0	1	1	10
7	(Soviet Union) Vladimir Alatortsev	1	1	0	½	½	½	-	0	½	½	0	½	1	½	½	1	0	1	9
8	(Soviet Union) Isaac Boleslavsky	0	½	½	0	0	1	1	-	1	1	½	½	0	1	½	½	½	½	9
9	(Soviet Union) Efim Geller	0	0	1	1	½	½	½	0	-	0	½	1	1	1	0	0	1	1	9
10	(Soviet Union) Salo Flohr	0	½	0	0	½	½	½	0	1	-	1	½	1	½	1	1	½	½	9
11	(Soviet Union) Vladas Mikenas	0	½	0	0	½	0	1	½	½	0	-	1	0	½	1	1	1	1	8½
12	(Soviet Union) Tigran Petrosian	1	0	1	0	½	½	½	½	0	½	0	-	1	0	0	1	½	1	8
13	(Soviet Union) Igor Bondarevsky	½	½	½	½	½	0	0	1	0	0	1	0	-	1	1	½	½	½	8
14	(Soviet Union) Yuri Averbakh	0	0	0	½	0	½	½	0	0	½	½	1	0	-	1	½	1	1	7
15	(Soviet Union) Alexey Suetin	½	1	0	0	0	0	½	½	1	0	0	1	0	0	-	1	1	0	6½
16	(Soviet Union) Georgy Borisenko	0	0	½	½	½	1	0	½	1	0	0	0	½	½	0	-	1	½	6½
17	(Soviet Union) Alexey Sokolsky	½	0	0	0	0	0	1	½	0	½	0	½	½	0	0	0	-	½	4
18	(Soviet Union) Victor Liublinsky	0	0	0	0	½	0	0	½	0	½	0	0	½	0	1	½	½	-	4
