= Isaac Lipnitsky =

Soviet chess player (1923–1959)

Personal information
- Born: Isaac Oskarovich Lipnitsky; 25 June 1923 Kyiv, Ukrainian SSR, Soviet Union
- Died: 25 March 1959 (aged 35) Kyiv, Ukrainian SSR, Soviet Union

Chess career
- Country: Soviet Union
- Title: Chess Master; Ukrainian Champion (1949, 1956)

Isaac Oskarovich Lipnitsky (Ukrainian: Ісаак Оскарович Липницький; 25 June 1923 – 25 March 1959) was a Soviet chess master. He was a two-time Ukrainian champion (1949, 1956), and was among Ukraine's top half-dozen players from 1948 to 1956. He was a chess theoretician and professional teacher.

== Early life ==
Born in Kyiv, Lipnitsky was a childhood companion and chess rival of David Bronstein in Kyiv. In Bronstein's 1995 book, coauthored with Tom Furstenberg, The Sorcerer's Apprentice, Bronstein and Lipnitsky are pictured together in a group photo from the Kyiv Junior Chess Club in 1939, and Bronstein includes an early drawn game from 1938 against Lipnitsky in his collection.

Lipnitsky qualified for his first Ukrainian Championship in 1939 at Dnepropetrovsk at age 16, and he made a very creditable 7th place, with 8/15 (+5 −4 =6), half a point ahead of Bronstein, who was also making his debut at age 15. The Second World War then suspended most chess competition in the USSR for the next six years. Lipnitsky served in the Soviet Red Army, fought in the Battle of Stalingrad, and was decorated four times.

Lipnitsky's first result of note after the war in high-level competition was a tie for 5th–8th places in the 1948 Ukrainian Championship at Kyiv with 11/18, only half a point behind winner Anatoly Bannik, another childhood rival from the Kiev Junior Chess Club. In a tournament at Kharkiv 1948, Lipnitsky scored 7½/15, to place 11th.

== Ukrainian Champion, Soviet runner-up ==
Lipnitsky won the Ukrainian Championship in 1949 at Kiev, with a very strong 15½/19 (+14 −2 =3). This earned him the Master title. Efim Geller, who later earned the Grandmaster title, was second.

Lipnitsky had by far the best result of his career at Moscow in 1950 at the URS-ch18, where he scored a superb 11/17 (+8 −3 =6), to tie for 2nd–4th places, along with Lev Aronin and Alexander Tolush, only half a point behind champion Paul Keres.

In the 1950 Ukrainian Championship at Kiev, Lipnitsky scored 12/17 to place a strong second. In the 1952 Ukrainian Championship at Kiev, Lipnitsky finished in a tied 5th–6th place with 8½/15. Then in the 1953 Ukrainian Championship at Kiev, he ended up in a tied 3rd–4th place, with 8½/13.

Lipnitsky did not do anywhere near as well in the next two Soviet Championships, however. In URS-ch19, Moscow 1951, Lipnitsky scored just 6½/17 (+4 −8 =5), for a tied 15th–16th place, and a 2588 performance. At URS-ch20, Moscow 1952, Lipnitsky made only 7/19 (+3 −8 =8), for 17th place, and a 2567 performance.

Lipnitsky scored a very good 7/10 in the 1954 USSR Team Championship at Riga. He won the Ukrainian Championship again in 1956 at Kiev with 15/19, this time a point ahead of Bannik, who was second.

Unfortunately, in later years, his play has been affected by poor health.

== Legacy and style ==
Lipnitsky never got the chance to compete internationally in an individual tournament, missing out on the chance to earn international chess titles. Very few Soviet players got the chance to compete internationally during those years, and invitations were controlled by the USSR Chess Federation. In the Ukraine of his peak years, the region had more than 30 million people, and chess was very popular, with many strong players. By the chess standards of the 21st century, with Ukraine now an independent nation since 1991, Lipnitsky was certainly of International Master standard, and likely Grandmaster level. Lipnitsky achieved victories over most of the top Soviet players of his era during his peak years from 1948–56, including Paul Keres, Vasily Smyslov, Tigran Petrosian, Alexander Kotov, Yuri Averbakh, Igor Bondarevsky, Mark Taimanov, Efim Geller, Semyon Furman, Lev Aronin, Alexei Suetin, Ilya Kan, and Evgeny Vasiukov, among others. He had a wide opening repertoire with both colours, and his style was positional in nature, with tactics not dominating, but flowing from the situation.

== Personal life ==
Isaac was a son of Oscar (d. 1975) and Sima (d. 1958) and had one brother (Don). He was married to an actress Lyalya Leshchinskaya. They had one daughter Liana (June 2, 1946 - April 12, 2000). During World War II, he served as a corporal in an anti-spy unit. Lipnitsky died at age 35 in Kiev in 1959. The cause of death was polycythemia, a kind of chronic leucosis. It is mentioned in a book Isaak Lipnitsky by Vadim Teplitsky (Israel, 1993, in Russian).

== Notable chess games ==
- Isaak Lipnitsky vs Tigran Petrosian, USSR Championship, Moscow 1950, Bogo-Indian Defence (E11), 1–0 It's a very tough maneuvering endgame win over a future World Champion.
- Isaak Lipnitsky vs Vasily Smyslov, USSR Championship, Moscow 1950, Queen's Gambit Declined, Slav Defence, Exchange Variation (D13), 1–0 Smyslov, another future World Champion, is a master of the endgame, but here Lipnitsky proves just a bit too tough with a patient strategical victory.
- Alexander Kotov vs Isaak Lipnitsky, USSR Championship, Moscow 1951, Nimzo-Indian Defence, Classical Variation (E35), 0–1 Some very clever tactics feature in this Kingside attack.
- Alexei Suetin vs Isaak Lipnitsky, USSR Championship, Moscow 1952, Ruy Lopez, Modern Steinitz Defence (C79), 0–1 Black whips up a dandy attack after White's Queen goes pawnhunting.
- Isaak Lipnitsky vs Ilya Kan, USSR Championship, Moscow 1952, Sicilian Defence, Kan/Paulsen Variation (B43), 1–0 Kan's special variation takes a beating.
- Isaak Lipnitsky vs Evgeniy Vasiukov, USSR Team Championship, Voroshilovgrad 1955, King's Indian Defence, Fianchetto Variation (E60), 1–0 Black's slightly offbeat opening strategy gets slowly squeezed.

== Bibliography ==
- Isaac Lipnitsky (2008). Questions of Modern Chess Theory. Quality Chess. ISBN 9781906552039.
