= 1947 USSR Chess Championship =

Soviet chess tournament

15th Soviet Chess Championship (1947)
- Location: Leningrad

Champion
- Paul Keres

The 1947 Soviet Chess Championship was the 15th edition of USSR Chess Championship. Held from 2 February to 8 March 1947 in Leningrad. The tournament was won by Paul Keres. Mikhail Botvinnik was absent as a sign of his displeasure over the lack of good faith by the Soviet authorities in negotiating for a World Championship match-tournament.

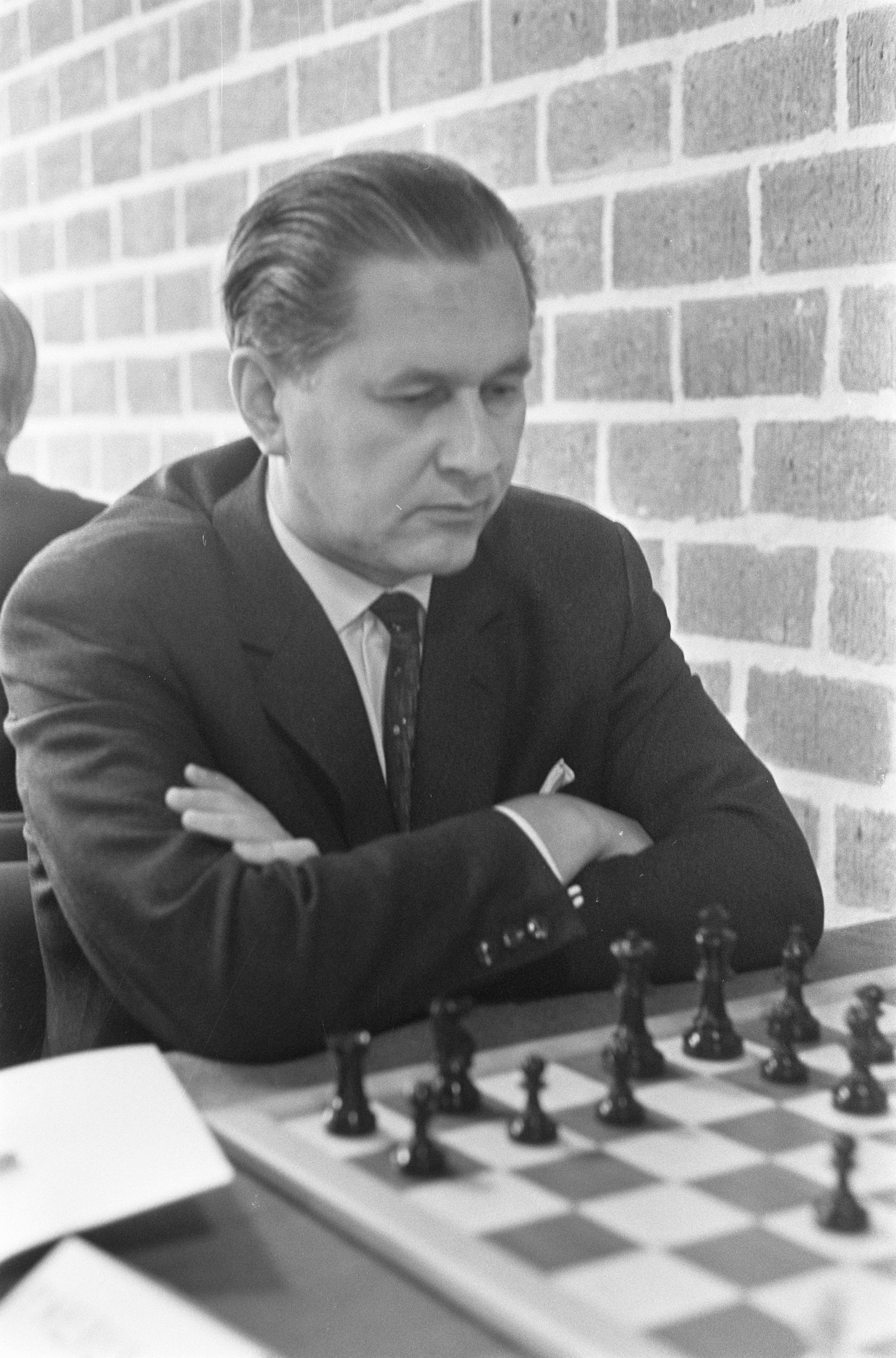
Paul Keres

== Tables and results ==
15th Soviet Chess Championship (1947)
	Player	1	2	3	4	5	6	7	8	9	10	11	12	13	14	15	16	17	18	19	20	Total
1	(Soviet Union) Paul Keres	-	½	1	½	½	1	½	½	1	1	1	1	½	½	1	1	½	1	0	1	14
2	(Soviet Union) Isaac Boleslavsky	½	-	½	½	½	1	½	½	1	½	½	½	½	1	1	1	½	1	1	½	13
3	(Soviet Union) Vassily Smyslov	0	½	-	½	½	1	½	1	1	½	½	1	1	1	0	½	1	½	½	½	12
4	(Soviet Union) Igor Bondarevsky	½	½	½	-	½		½	½	1	½	1	1	½	½	1	½	1	½	0	1	11½
5	(Soviet Union) David Bronstein	½	½	½	½	-	½	½	0	½	1	1	0	½	½	½	½	1	½	1	1	11
6	(Soviet Union) Alexander Tolush	0	0	0		½	-	½	1	1	½	½	1	½	1	1	1	½	½	½	1	11
7	(Soviet Union) Salo Flohr	½	½	½	½	½	½	-	½	½	1	½	½	½	0	0	1	0	1	1	1	10½
8	(Soviet Union) Andor Lilienthal	½	½	0	½	1	0	½	-	1	½	½	1	½	½	½	½	½	½	1	½	10½
9	(Soviet Union) Viacheslav Ragozin	0	0	0	0	½	0	½	0	-	½	½	1	1	½	1	1	½	1	1	1	10
10	(Soviet Union) Vladimir Makogonov	0	½	½	½	0	½	0	½	½	-	½	½	0	½	½	1	½	1	1	½	9
11	(Soviet Union) Grigory Levenfish	0	½	½	0	0	½	½	½	½	½	-	0	½	½	½	1	1	1	0	1	9
12	(Soviet Union) Genrikh Kasparian	0	½	0	0	1	0	½	0	0	½	1	-	1	0	1	½	1	0	1	1	9
13	(Soviet Union) Mikhail Yudovich	½	½	0	½	½	½	½	½	0	1	½	0	-	½	½	0	0	½	1	½	8
14	(Soviet Union) Ilya Kan	½	0	0	½	½	0	1	½	½	½	½	1	½	-	0	0	1	½	½	0	8
15	(Soviet Union) Anatoly Ufimtsev	0	0	1	0	½	0	1	½	0	½	½	0	½	1	-	0	½	½	1	½	8
16	(Soviet Union) Vladimir Alatortsev	0	0	½	½	½	0	0	½	0	0	0	½	1	1	1	-	1	½	½	0	7½
17	(Soviet Union) Lev Aronin	½	½	0	0	0	½	1	½	½	½	0	0	1	0	½	0	-	½	1	0	7
18	(Soviet Union) Boris Goldenov	0	0	½	½	½	½	0	½	0	0	0	1	½	½	½	½	½	-	0	1	7
19	(Soviet Union) Konstantin Klaman	1	0	½	1	0	½	0	0	0	0	1	0	0	½	0	½	0	1	-	½	6½
20	(Soviet Union) Peter Dubinin	0	½	½	0	0	0	0	½	0	½	0	0	½	1	½	1	1	0	½	-	6½
