= Piatigorsky Cup =

1963 and 1966 American chess tournaments

The Piatigorsky Cup was a triennial series of double round-robin grandmaster chess tournaments held in the United States in the 1960s. Sponsored by the Piatigorsky Foundation, only two events were held, in 1963 and 1966. The Piatigorsky Cups were the strongest U.S. chess tournaments since New York 1927.

Jacqueline Piatigorsky (née Rothschild) was married to cellist Gregor Piatigorsky. One of the strongest woman chess players in the U.S. and a regular competitor in the U.S. Women's Chess Championship, she designed the cup and was the primary organizer of the tournament. The prize funds were among the largest of any chess tournament up to that time. Every player was guaranteed a prize and all traveling and living expenses were paid.

== Los Angeles 1963 ==
The First Piatigorsky Cup was held in The Ambassador Hotel, Los Angeles in July 1963. The tournament field of eight included players from five countries. The Soviet representatives Paul Keres and World Champion Tigran Petrosian finished equal first to share the cup with a score of 8½/14, receiving more than half of the $10,000 prize fund ($3000 for first). Since dollars brought back to the USSR were exchanged by the Soviet government for rubles at an unfavorable rate, Keres and Petrosian were reported to have bought automobiles (Ramblers) with their winnings. Keres's Rambler is today preserved in Halinga Car Museum near Pärnu in Estonia. Keres won the most games in the tournament (six), but lost twice to Samuel Reshevsky. The Cup was Petrosian's first tournament since winning the 1963 World Championship match with Mikhail Botvinnik and was one of two first prizes he shared in his six-year reign as champion. He was the first reigning champion to play in an American tournament since Alexander Alekhine at Pasadena 1932. After losing in the second round to Svetozar Gligorić, Petrosian was never in danger the rest of the tournament.

The remainder of the tournament field included two Americans, Reshevsky and Pal Benko, two Argentinians, Oscar Panno and Miguel Najdorf, and two Europeans, Gligorić (Yugoslavia) and Friðrik Ólafsson (Iceland). U.S. Champion Bobby Fischer declined an invitation after his demand for a $2000 appearance fee was refused by the tournament organizers.

Gligorić led halfway through the tournament with 4½/7, but he scored only three draws in the last seven games and finished fifth behind Najdorf and Ólafsson. Petrosian finished the strongest, with 5/7 in the second half. Before the last round, Petrosian led with 8 points, followed by Keres with 7½ and Najdorf and Ólafsson with 7. Both Petrosian and Keres had Black in the final round. Petrosian drew his game against Reshevsky, but Keres beat Gligorić to result in a tie for first place with 8½ points each.

Isaac Kashdan served as tournament director and edited a tournament book published in 1965, with the annotations mostly by Reshevsky.

=== Crosstable ===
Los Angeles (1st Piatigorsky Cup) 2–27 July 1963
		1	2	3	4	5	6	7	8	Total
1	Paul Keres (Soviet Union)	–	½ ½	½ 0	1 1	0 0	½ 1	1 1	½ 1	8½
2	Tigran Petrosian (Soviet Union)	½ ½	–	½ ½	½ ½	½ ½	0 1	1 1	½ 1	8½
3	Miguel Najdorf (Argentina)	½ 1	½ ½	–	½ 0	1 ½	½ ½	0 ½	1 ½	7½
4	Friðrik Ólafsson (Iceland)	0 0	½ ½	½ 1	–	½ 1	½ 1	1 0	½ ½	7½
5	Samuel Reshevsky (United States)	1 1	½ ½	0 ½	½ 0	–	½ ½	1 ½	0 ½	7
6	Svetozar Gligorić (Yugoslavia)	½ 0	1 0	½ ½	½ 0	½ ½	–	½ 0	1 ½	6
7	Pal Benko (United States)	0 0	0 0	1 ½	0 1	0 ½	½ 1	–	1 0	5½
8	Oscar Panno (Argentina)	½ 0	½ 0	0 ½	½ ½	1 ½	0 ½	0 1	–	5½

== Santa Monica 1966 ==
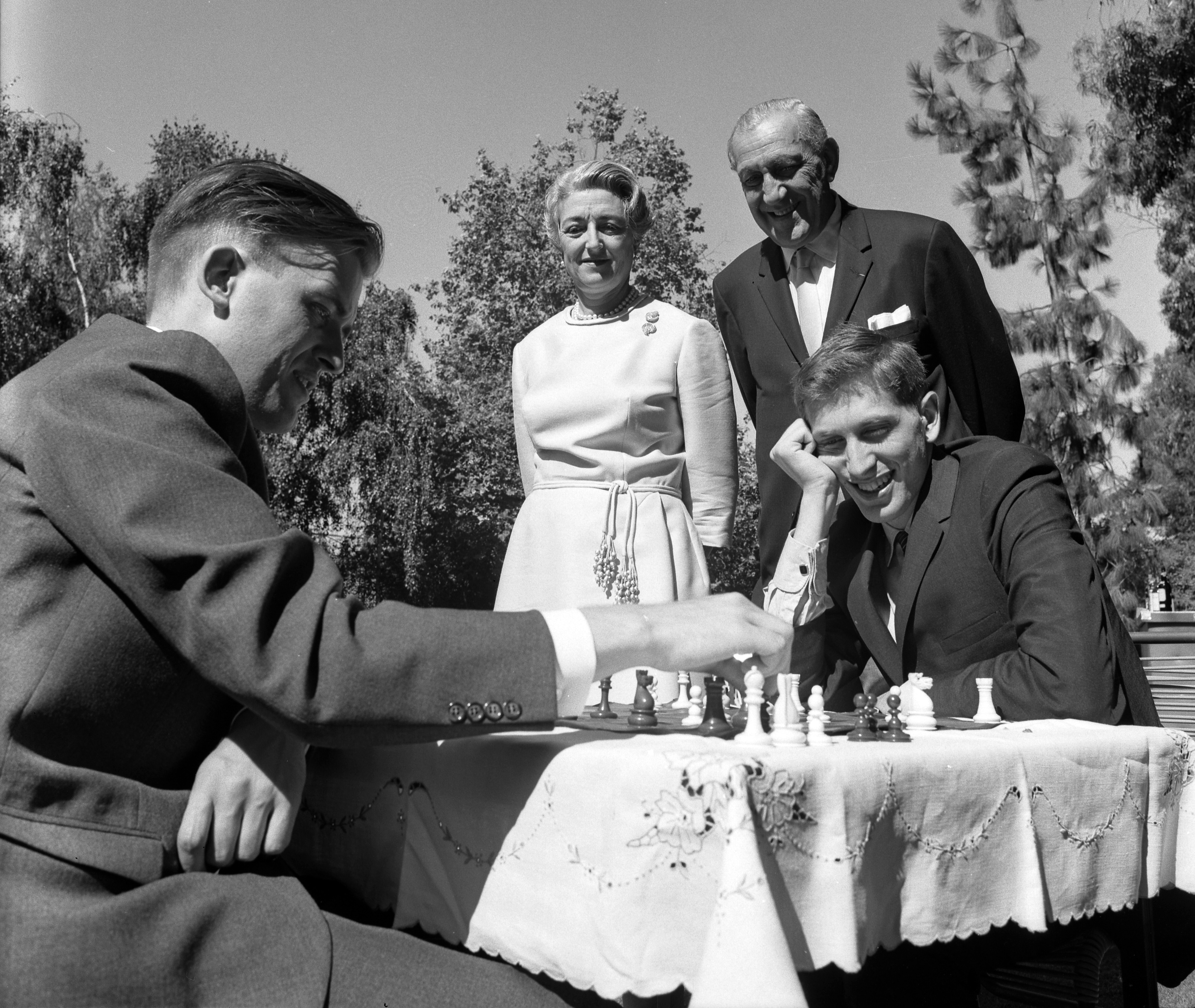
Gregor and Jacqueline Piatigorsky watching Bent Larsen (left) and Bobby Fischer between rounds during the 1966 event

The second and final tournament in the series was held in July and August 1966 at the Miramar Hotel, Santa Monica. The field was increased from eight players to ten and the prize fund was doubled to $20,000 (first prize: $5000, second: $3000, third: $2500, fourth: $2000, fifth: $1750, sixth: $1500, seventh: $1300, eighth: $1150, ninth: $1050, tenth: $1000). This time all invited players accepted, including Fischer. With the increased tournament field, eight countries were represented. Although Soviet-U.S. tension over the Vietnam War seemed to threaten Soviet participation in the event, the Soviet Chess Federation sent World Champion Tigran Petrosian and challenger Boris Spassky. Petrosian and Spassky had finished a World Championship match in the spring in which Petrosian retained his title. The remainder of the field included Bobby Fischer and Samuel Reshevsky (U.S.A), Bent Larsen (Denmark), Lajos Portisch (Hungary), Wolfgang Unzicker (West Germany), Miguel Najdorf (Argentina), Borislav Ivkov (Yugoslavia), and Jan Hein Donner (Netherlands).

Interest in the tournament was unusually high for a chess event in the United States, with over 500 spectators attending most sessions. The 17th-round game between tournament leaders Spassky and Fischer drew over 900 spectators, with many turned away. Positions of the games in progress were displayed to the crowds using a novel projection system devised by Jacqueline Piatigorsky rather than the usual wall boards.

Spassky jumped out to an early lead with wins over Unzicker, Ivkov, and Fischer. At the halfway point he was tied with Larsen for first with 6/9. Petrosian fell out of contention early, after a loss in the third round to Portisch and another loss in the seventh round after Larsen made a queen sacrifice. Fischer lost three games in a row in the second week of play (rounds 6, 7, and 8) and was next to last with 3½/9 at the halfway point. Fischer then won four straight games (all before adjournment), drew one, then won two more to catch up to Spassky with two rounds remaining. Spassky had defeated Fischer in the eighth round, but they met for the second time in the penultimate round. Although Fischer had the advantage of the white pieces, Spassky used the Marshall Attack in the Ruy Lopez to draw easily in 37 moves. In the final round tied with 10½ points each, Spassky defeated Donner while Fischer drew with Petrosian, making Spassky the tournament winner by half a point, as he was the only undefeated player. Fischer and Larsen won the most games (seven each), but Fischer could not overcome his slow start. Larsen was tied for the lead as late as round 11, but although he defeated Petrosian in both their games his four losses (including three in rounds 12 to 15) dropped him to third place. Sharing the fourth and fifth prizes, Portisch and Unzicker were the only other players with a plus score. World Champion Petrosian's sixth-place finish was a disappointment, but he may have still been feeling the strain of his recent World Championship match with Spassky, who was eight years his junior.

The tournament book Second Piatigorsky Cup (1968) edited by the tournament director Isaac Kashdan was unusual in that it featured notes by most of the participants. Seven players annotated all of their games, Fischer provided notes for one of his games (against Najdorf).

=== Crosstable and cumulative scores ===
Santa Monica (2nd Piatigorsky Cup) 17 July – 15 August 1966 Cumulative Scores by Round
	1	2	3	4	5	6	7	8	9	10	11	12	13	14	15	16	17	18
Boris Spassky (Soviet Union)	½	1½	2	2½	3	3½	4½	5½	6	6½	7	7½	8½	9	9½	10	10½	11½
Bobby Fischer (United States)	½	1	2	2½	3	3	3	3	3½	4½	5½	6½	7½	8	9	10	10½	11
Bent Larsen (Denmark)	0	½	1	1½	2½	3½	4½	5	6	7	7	7	7	7½	7½	8½	9½	10
Lajos Portisch (Hungary)	½	1	2	2½	3	3½	4	4½	4½	5	5	5½	6	6½	7½	8½	9	9½
Wolfgang Unzicker (West Germany)	½	½	1	1½	2	2½	3	3½	4½	5	5½	6½	7	7½	8	8½	9	9½
Tigran Petrosian (Soviet Union)	½	1	1	1½	2	2½	2½	3½	4	4½	5	5½	6	7	7½	7½	8½	9
Samuel Reshevsky (United States)	½	1	1½	2	2½	3½	4	4½	5	5	5½	6	6½	7	7½	8	8	9
Miguel Najdorf (Argentina)	½	1½	2	2½	2½	3	4	4	4½	5	5½	6½	7	7½	8	8	8	8
Borislav Ivkov (Yugoslavia)	1	1	1	1½	2	2½	2½	3	3	3	3½	3½	4	4½	4½	5	6	6½
Jan Hein Donner (Netherlands)	½	1	1½	2	2½	2½	3	3½	4	4½	5½	5½	5½	5½	6	6	6	6

Santa Monica (2nd Piatigorsky Cup) 17 July – 15 August 1966 Crosstable
		1	2	3	4	5	6	7	8	9	10	Total
1	Boris Spassky (Soviet Union)	–	1 ½	½ 1	½ ½	1 ½	½ ½	½ ½	½ ½	1 ½	½ 1	11½
2	Bobby Fischer (United States)	0 ½	–	0 1	½ 1	½ ½	½ ½	½ 1	0 1	1 1	½ 1	11
3	Bent Larsen (Denmark)	½ 0	1 0	–	1 ½	½ 0	1 1	½ 1	1 ½	0 1	½ 0	10
4	Lajos Portisch (Hungary)	½ ½	½ 0	0 ½	–	½ ½	1 ½	½ ½	½ ½	½ 1	½ 1	9½
5	Wolfgang Unzicker (West Germany)	0 ½	½ ½	½ 1	½ ½	–	½ ½	½ ½	½ ½	1 ½	½ ½	9½
6	Tigran Petrosian (Soviet Union)	½ ½	½ ½	0 0	0 ½	½ ½	–	½ ½	1 1	½ ½	½ 1	9
7	Samuel Reshevsky (United States)	½ ½	½ 0	½ 0	½ ½	½ ½	½ ½	–	½ 1	½ ½	1 ½	9
8	Miguel Najdorf (Argentina)	½ ½	1 0	0 ½	½ ½	½ ½	0 0	½ 0	–	1 ½	½ 1	8
9	Borislav Ivkov (Yugoslavia)	0 ½	0 0	1 0	½ 0	0 ½	½ ½	½ ½	0 ½	–	½ 1	6½
10	Jan Hein Donner (Netherlands)	½ 0	½ 0	½ 1	½ 0	½ ½	½ 0	0 ½	½ 0	½ 0	–	6
