= János Flesch =

Hungarian chess grandmaster

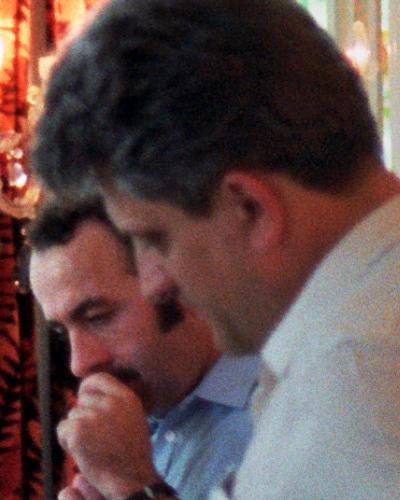
János Flesch (right) 1982

János Flesch (30 September 1933 – 9 December 1983) was a chess Grandmaster, chess writer and coach, born in Budapest, Hungary. He is best known for claiming a world record simultaneous blindfold exhibition when he played 52 opponents in Budapest in 1960. However, he was apparently allowed to consult scoresheets as well as verbally recount moves of the games in progress and therefore, his claim was disallowed.

Flesch was awarded the International Master (IM) title in 1963 and the Honorary Grandmaster (GM) title in 1980. He died in an automobile accident with his wife Ildiko Tenyei in Whitstable, England, in 1983.

Represented Hungary on the Tel-Aviv Chess Olympiad (1964) (fourth place), also participated in the European Team Chess Championship in Hamburg (1965) (third place).

From 1967 he was working as chess trainer:
(1967–1970) Ferencvárosi Torna Club (FTC) Chess Club
(1971–1983) PMSC Chess Club

== Playing style ==
János Flesch was an attacking player, taking risk in his games, developing an imaginative style of play. He often sacrificed material in search for the initiative in chess. In many of his sharp games he won with a creative attack against the opponent's king.

== Notable chess games ==
- Janos Flesch vs Mikhail Tal, Miskolc 1963, Sicilian Defense: Modern Variations,(B50), ½–½ The opponent is none other than the "Magician from Riga" the great World Champion - Mikhail Tal and Janos Flesch secures a draw in a fighting game.
- Janos Flesch vs Hrumo, BFX Budapest 1960, King's Gambit: Accepted.Rosentreter-Testa Gambit,(C37), 1-0 A creative short attacking game, representing the playing style of J.Flesch.
- Janos Flesch vs Viktor Korchnoi, Belgrade 1964, Sicilian Defense: Old Sicilian. General,(B30), 1-0
- Janos Flesch vs Svetozar Gligoric, Belgrade 1964, King's Indian Attack(A07), ½–½
- Boris Spassky vs Janos Flesch, Tel-Aviv 1964, Queen's Gambit Declined: Lasker Defense. Main Line.(D57), ½–½

== Writings ==
- János Flesch (1981). The Morra (Smith) Gambit. Dharma Books. ISBN 0-7134-2188-6.
- János Flesch (1983). Planning in Chess. B.T. Batsford. ISBN 0-7134-1597-5.
- János Flesch (1984). Halboffene Spiele für jedermann. Frackh/Rattman. ISBN 3-440-05290-7.
- János Flesch, Egon Varnusz, Tibor Flórián (1984). Sakkvilagbajnoksag 1976: Manila, Biel, Varese. Sport. ISBN 963-253-314-3.
