= Paul Keres =

Estonian chess grandmaster (1916–1975)

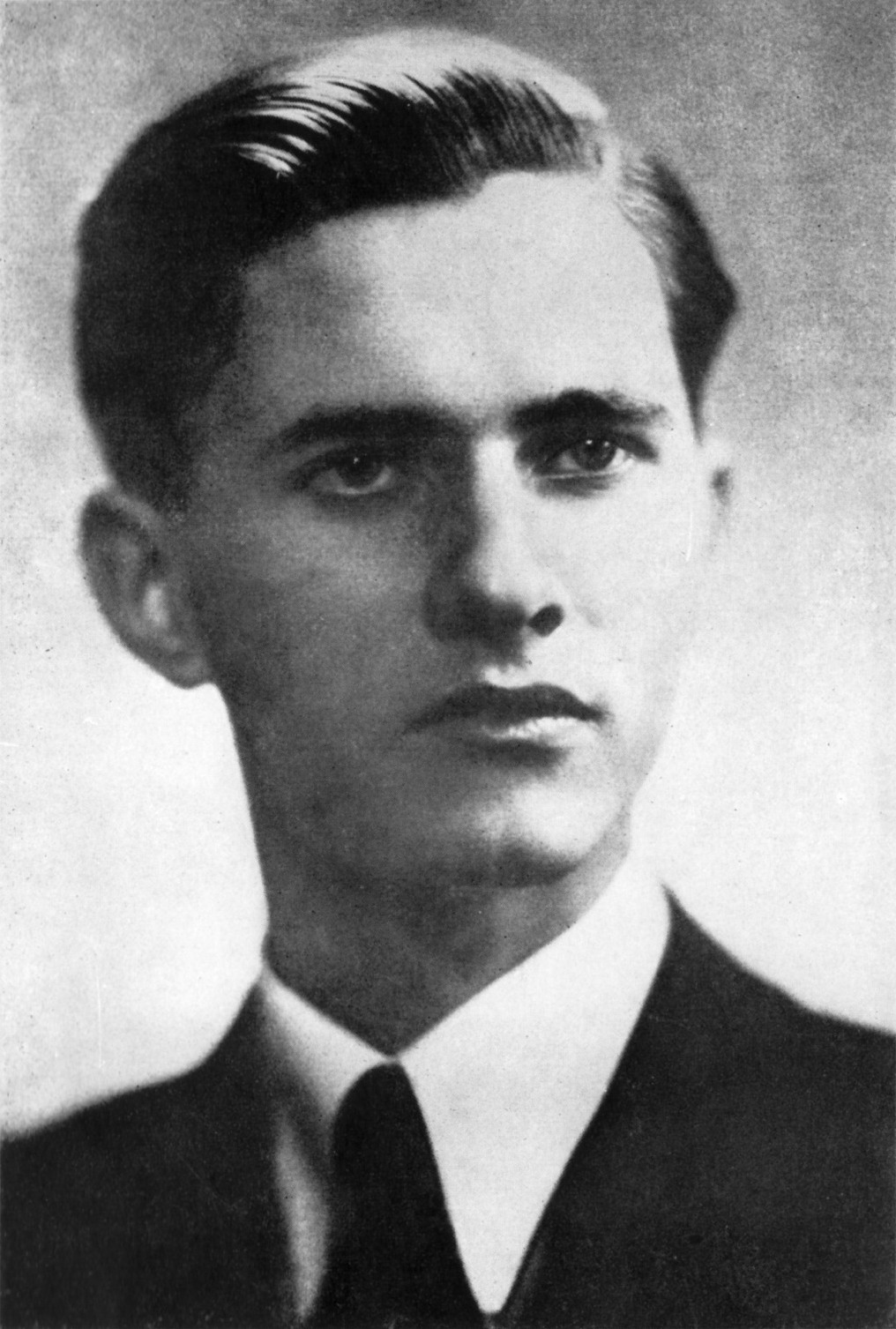
- Keres in 1938

Personal information
- Born: 7 January 1916 Joaoru, Governorate of Estonia, Russian Empire
- Died: 5 June 1975 (aged 59) Helsinki, Finland

Chess career
- Country: Estonia; Soviet Union (1944–1975)
- Title: Grandmaster (1950)
- Peak rating: 2615 (July 1971)
- Peak ranking: No. 11 (July 1971)

Paul Keres (Note: Approximate pronunciation: [ˈpɑu̯l ˈkeres].) (7 January 1916 – 5 June 1975) was an Estonian chess grandmaster and chess writer. He was among the world's top players from the mid-1930s to the mid-1960s, and narrowly missed a chance at a World Chess Championship match on five occasions. As Estonia was repeatedly invaded and occupied during World War II, Keres was forced by the circumstances to represent the Soviet Union (1940–1941, 1944–1975) and Nazi Germany (1941–1944) in international tournaments.

Keres won the AVRO 1938 chess tournament, which led to negotiations for a title match against the reigning World Champion Alexander Alekhine, but the match never took place due to the outbreak of World War II in 1939. Keres was runner-up in the Candidates Tournament on four consecutive occasions from 1953 to 1962. Due to these and other strong results, many chess historians consider Keres along with Viktor Korchnoi to be the strongest players never to become world champion.

Robert McFadden of The New York Times described Keres as having "elegant manners and an informal but unflappable bearing", and stated that "his competitiveness and well‐known sense of fairness made him one of the game's most popular figures". Widely admired by Estonians to this day, he was nicknamed "Paul the Second", "The Eternal Second", and "The Crown Prince of Chess".

== Early life ==
Keres was born in 1916 in Joaoru, a village in the Governorate of Estonia of the Russian Empire then situated just outside the city limits (now administratively part) of Narva, to parents Peeter and Marie Keres (née Lämmergas). He was two years old when Estonia became an independent country in 1918.

Keres grew up in Pärnu, Estonia. He first learned about chess from his father and his elder brother Harald (afterwards a prominent physicist, who later told friendly jokes to his students: "I am not Paul's brother; Paul is my brother"). With the scarcity of chess literature in his home town, he learned about chess notation from the chess puzzles in the daily newspaper, and compiled a handwritten collection of almost a thousand games. In his early days, he was known for a brilliant and sharp attacking style.

== In independent Estonia ==
Keres was a three-time schoolboy champion of the country, in 1930, 1932, and 1933. His playing matured after playing correspondence chess extensively while in high school. He probably played about 500 correspondence games, and at one stage had 150 correspondence games going simultaneously. In 1935, he won the Internationaler Fernschachbund (IFSB) international correspondence chess championship. From 1937 to 1941 he studied mathematics at the University of Tartu, and competed in several inter-university matches.

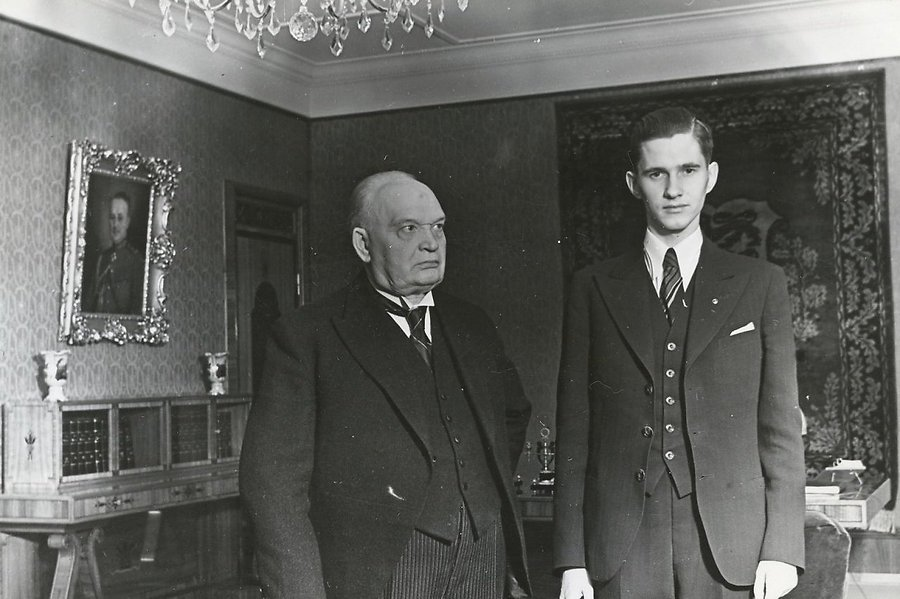
Keres (right) and Estonian president Konstantin Päts in Tallinn in 1938

Keres achieved a very good result at the age of 17 in a Master tournament in Tallinn 1933 with 5/7 (+5−2=0), tied 3rd–4th, half a point behind joint winners Paul Felix Schmidt and V. Kappe. Keres became champion of Estonia for the first time in 1935. He tied for first (+5−2=1) with Gunnar Friedemann in the tournament, then defeated him (+2−1=0) in the playoff match. In April 1935, Keres defeated Feliks Kibbermann, one of Tartu's leading masters, in a training match, by (+3−1=0).

Keres played on top board for Estonia in the 6th Chess Olympiad at Warsaw 1935, and was regarded as the new star, admired for his dashing style. His success there gave him the confidence to venture onto the international circuit.

At Helsinki 1935, he placed 2nd behind Paulin Frydman with 6½/8 (+6−1=1). He won in Tallinn 1936 with 9/10 (+8−0=2). Keres' first major international success against top-level competition came at Bad Nauheim 1936, where he tied for first with Alexander Alekhine at 6½/9 (+4−0=5). He struggled at Dresden 1936, placing only 8–9th with (+2−4=3), but wrote that he learned an important lesson from this setback. Keres recovered at Zandvoort 1936 with a shared 3rd–4th place (+5−3=3). He then defended his Estonian title in 1936 by drawing a challenge match against Paul Felix Schmidt with (+3−3=1).

Keres had a series of successes in 1937. He won in Tallinn with 7½/9 (+6−0=3), then shared 1st–2nd at Margate with Reuben Fine at 7½/9 (+6−0=3), 1½ points ahead of Alekhine. In Ostend, he tied 1st–3rd places with Fine and Henry Grob at 6/9 (+5−2=2). Keres dominated in Prague to claim first with 10/11 (+9−0=2). He then won a theme tournament in Vienna with 4½/6 (+4−1=1); the tournament saw all games commence with the moves 1.d4 Nf6 2.Nf3 Ne4, known as the Döry Defence. He tied for 4–5th places at Kemeri with 11½/17 (+8−2=7), as Salo Flohr, Vladimirs Petrovs and Samuel Reshevsky won. Then he tied 2nd–4th in Pärnu with 4½/7 (+3−1=3).

This successful string earned him an invitation to the tournament at Semmering–Baden 1937, which he won with 9/14 (+6−2=6), ahead of Fine, José Raúl Capablanca, Reshevsky, and Erich Eliskases. Keres, in his autobiographical games collection, refers to this major event as a 'Candidates' Tournament', and claimed that he was recognized as a Grandmaster after winning it, although its parallel connection with later FIDE-organized Candidates' tournaments (from 1950 onwards) is not exact, and the Grandmaster title was not formalized by FIDE until 1950.

Keres tied for second at Hastings 1937–38 with 6½/9 (+4−0=5) (half a point behind Reshevsky), and at Noordwijk 1938 (behind Eliskases) with 6½/9 (+4−0=5). Keres drew an exhibition match at Stockholm 1938 with Gideon Ståhlberg on 4–4 (+2−2=4).

He continued to represent Estonia with success in Olympiad play. His detailed results for Estonia follow. Of note was the team bronze medal attained by Estonia in 1939; this was exceptional for a country with a population of less than two million people.

- Warsaw 1935, Estonia board 1, 12½/19 (+11−5=3);
- Munich 1936 (unofficial Olympiad), Estonia board 1, 15½/20 (+12−1=7), board gold medal;
- Stockholm 1937, Estonia board 1, 11/15 (+9−2=4), board silver medal;
- Buenos Aires 1939, Estonia board 1, 14½/19 (+12−2=5), team bronze medal.

== World Championship match denied ==
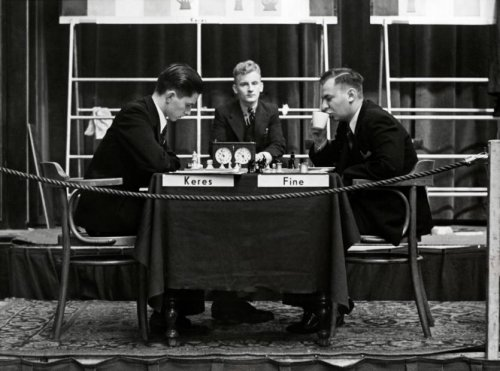
Keres playing against Reuben Fine at AVRO tournament in 1938

In 1938, he tied with Fine for first, with 8½/14, in the all-star AVRO tournament, held in various cities in the Netherlands, ahead of chess legends Mikhail Botvinnik, Max Euwe, Reshevsky, Alekhine, Capablanca and Flohr. Keres won on tiebreak because he beat Fine 1½–½ in their individual two games.

It was expected that the winner of this tournament would be the challenger for the World Chess Championship, in a match against World Champion Alexander Alekhine, but the outbreak of the Second World War, especially because of the first occupation of Estonia by the Soviet Union in 1940–41, brought negotiations with Alekhine to an end. Keres had begun his university studies in 1937, and this also played a role in the failure to set up a match.

Keres struggled at Leningrad–Moscow 1939 with a shared 12–13th place; he wrote that he had not had enough time to prepare for this very strong event, where he faced many Soviet top players for the first time. But he recovered with more preparation time, and won Margate 1939 with 7½/9 (+6−0=3), ahead of Capablanca and Flohr.

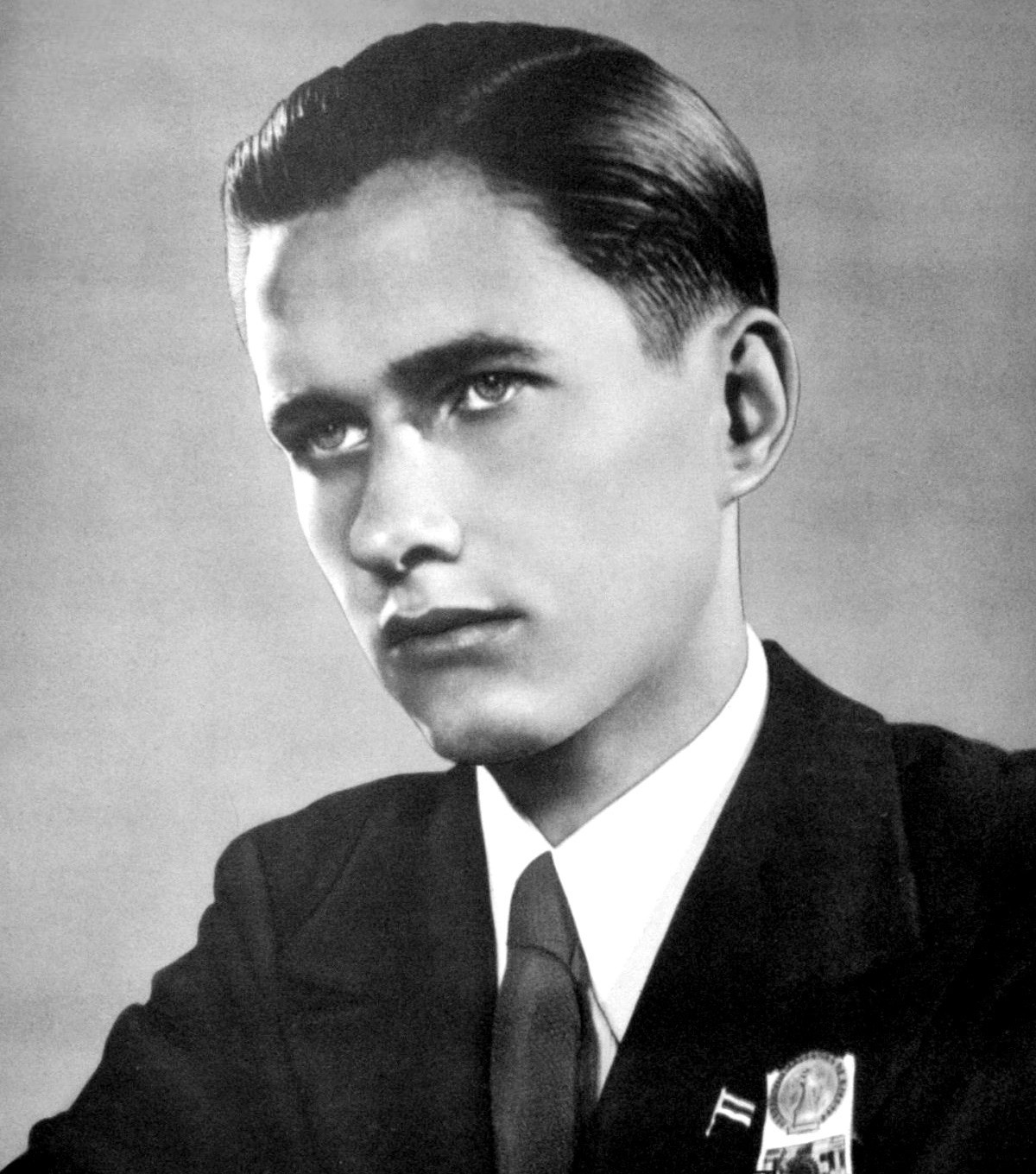
Keres in 1939

== World War II ==
During World War II, the previously independent nation of Estonia was invaded and occupied by the Soviet Union in June 1940. This lasted until the 1941 invasion and occupation by Nazi Germany, which in turn lasted until the Soviet Union reoccupied Estonia in 1944. The country remained under Soviet control for the rest of Keres' life. The 1944 Soviet reconquest of Estonia was a particularly dangerous time for Keres.

At the outbreak of World War II in September 1939, Keres was in Buenos Aires, Argentina for the Olympiad. He stayed on to play in a Buenos Aires international tournament after the Olympiad, and tied for first place with Miguel Najdorf with 8½/11 (+7−1=3).

His next event was a 14-game match with former World Champion Max Euwe in the Netherlands, held from December 1939 – January 1940. Keres won a hard-fought struggle by 7½–6½ (+6−5=3). This was a superb achievement, because not only was Euwe a former World Champion, but he had enormous experience at match play, far more than Keres.

=== First Soviet occupation (1940–41) ===
Estonia was invaded and occupied by the Soviet Red Army in June 1940, and formally annexed by the USSR in August 1940. Keres played in his first Soviet Championship at Moscow 1940 (URS-ch12), placing fourth (+9−4=6) in an exceptionally strong field, placing him ahead of the defending champion Mikhail Botvinnik, among others. The USSR Chess Federation organized the "Absolute Championship of the USSR" in 1941, with the top six finishers from the 1940 championship meeting each other four times; it was split between Leningrad and Moscow. Botvinnik won the event, one of the strongest ever organized, with 13½/20, and Keres placed second with 11, ahead of Vasily Smyslov, Isaac Boleslavsky, Andor Lilienthal, and Igor Bondarevsky.

In 1941, Keres graduated from the University of Tartu and the same year, married fellow student Maria Riives. The couple had two children: a son, Peeter (born in 1941), and a daughter, Kadrin (born in 1943). Both children were born while Estonia was under occupation.

=== German occupation (1941–44) ===
After Nazi Germany had invaded the Soviet Union in June 1941, Estonia came under German control a few weeks later. During 1942 and 1943, Keres and Alekhine both played in four tournaments organized by Ehrhardt Post, President of the Grossdeutscher Schachbund. Alekhine won at the Salzburg 1942 chess tournament (Six Grandmasters' Tournament) in June 1942, at Munich (European Individual Chess Championship) in September 1942, and at Prague (International Tournament) in April 1943, always ahead of Keres, who placed second in all three of those tournaments. They tied for first at Salzburg (Six Grandmasters' Tournament) in June 1943, with 7½/10.

During World War II, Keres played in several more chess tournaments. He won all 15 games at Tallinn 1942 (Estonian championship), and swept all five games at Posen 1943. He also won the Estonian title event held at Tallinn 1943, and Madrid 1944 (13/14, +12−0=2). He was second, behind Stig Lundholm, at Lidköping 1944 (playing hors concours in the Swedish Championship). Keres won a match with Folke Ekström at Stockholm in 1944 by 5–1 (+4−0=2).

As resident of German-occupied Estonia (then part of Reichskommissariat Ostland) in 1941–1944, Keres was able to travel across the European continent and participate in a number of international tournaments, held both in neutral countries (1944 Madrid, Lidköping, Stockholm) and in countries under Nazi German control (1942 Tallinn, Salzburg, Munich; 1943 Prague, Posen, Salzburg, Tallinn).

=== Second Soviet occupation (after 1944) ===
Before the Soviet Union reoccupied Estonia, in the autumn of 1944 Keres made an unsuccessful attempt to escape from the country over the sea to the west. A 1942 newspaper interview with Keres was later used by the Nazis for anti-Soviet propaganda. As a consequence, he was suspected of collaboration with the Nazis and questioned by the Soviet authorities. Keres managed to avoid deportation or any worse fate (e.g., that of Vladimirs Petrovs); however, he may have been held in detention; precise details are difficult to ascertain.

But his return to the international chess scene was delayed, in spite of his excellent form; he won at Riga 1944/45 (Baltic Championship) (10½/11). Presumably for political reasons, he was excluded from the ten-player Soviet team for the 1945 radio match against the US, and he did not participate in the first great post-war tournament at the 1946 Groningen tournament which was won by Botvinnik, just ahead of Euwe and Smyslov.

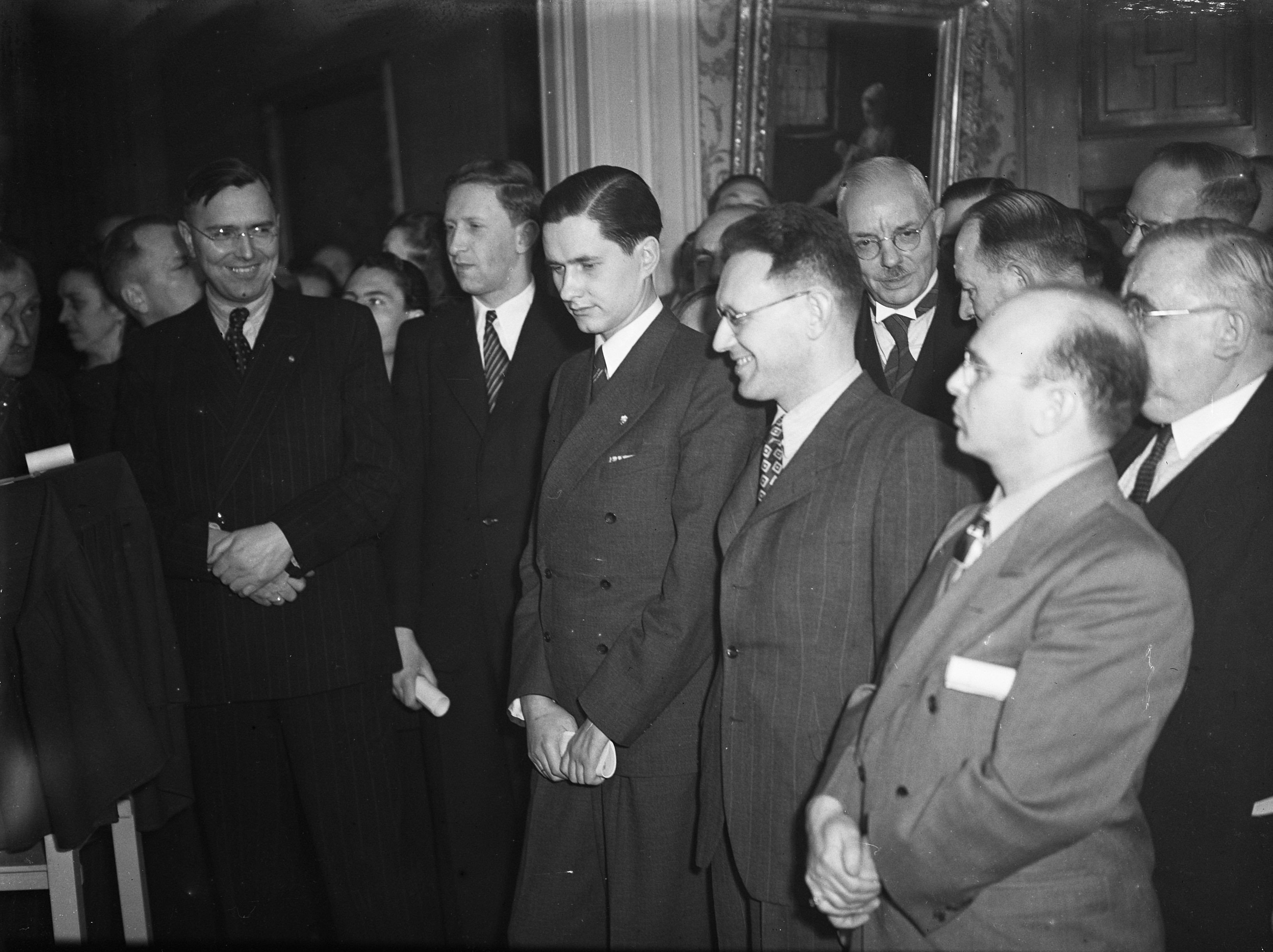
Keres at the 1948 World Championship tournament in the Hague: (from left) Max Euwe, Vassily Smyslov, Keres, Mikhail Botvinnik, and Samuel Reshevsky

He won the Estonian Championship at Tallinn 1945 with 13/15 (+11−0=4), ahead of several strong visiting Soviets, including Alexander Kotov, Alexander Tolush, Lilienthal, and Flohr. He then won at Tbilisi 1946 (hors concours in the Georgian Championship) with a near-perfect score of 18/19, ahead of Vladas Mikėnas and a 16-year-old Tigran Petrosian.

Keres returned to international play in 1946 in the Soviet radio match against Great Britain, and continued his excellent playing form that year and the next year. Keres was personally invited to the Groningen 1946 chess tournament, the first elite event following the end of the war, but was blocked from attending by the Soviet Chess Federation.

== World Championship Candidate (1948–1965) ==
Although Keres participated in the 1948 World Championship tournament, arranged to determine the world champion after Alekhine's death in 1946, his performance was far from his best. Held jointly in The Hague and Moscow, the tournament was limited to five participants: Mikhail Botvinnik, Vasily Smyslov, Paul Keres, Samuel Reshevsky, and Max Euwe. (Reuben Fine had also been invited but declined.) The event was played as a quintuple round-robin. Keres finished joint third, with 10½ out of 20 points. In his individual match with the winner, Botvinnik, he lost four of five games, winning only in the last round when the tournament's result was already determined.

Since Keres lost his first four games against Botvinnik in the 1948 tournament, suspicions have sometimes been raised that Keres was forced to "throw" games to allow Botvinnik to win the championship. Chess historian Taylor Kingston investigated the available evidence and arguments, concluded that Soviet chess officials had given Keres "strong hints" that he should not hinder Botvinnik's attempt to win the World Championship, and that Botvinnik only discovered this about halfway through the tournament and reportedly protested so strongly that he angered Soviet officials; and that Keres, in Kingston's assessment, probably did not deliberately lose games to Botvinnik or anyone else in the tournament.

Keres finished second or equal second in four straight Candidates' tournaments (1953, 1956, 1959, 1962), making him the player with the most runner-up finishes in that event. (He was therefore occasionally nicknamed "Paul II".) Keres participated in a total of six Candidates' Tournaments:

- Budapest 1950, 4th, behind David Bronstein and Isaac Boleslavsky, with 9½/18 (+3−2=13).
- Zurich 1953, tied 2nd–4th, along with David Bronstein and Reshevsky, two points behind Smyslov, with 16/28 (+8−4=16).
- Amsterdam 1956, 2nd, 1½ points behind Smyslov, with 10/18 (+3−1=14).
- Yugoslavia 1959, 2nd, 1½ points behind Mikhail Tal, with 18½/28 (+15−6=7). He had positive or equal scores against all the competitors, including 3–1 against Tal, but this was not enough, since Tal scored 14½/16 against the bottom four finishers.
- Curaçao 1962, tied 2nd–3rd, with Efim Geller, half a point behind Tigran Petrosian, with 17/27 (+9−2=16). Keres won a match at Moscow 1962 against Geller, for an exempt place in the 1965 Candidates, by 4½–3½ (+2−1=5).
- Riga 1965, lost his quarter-final match to eventual Candidates' winner Boris Spassky by 6–4 (+2−4=4). This was the only match loss of Keres' long career.

Keres' run of four successive second places in Candidates' tournaments (1953, 1956, 1959, 1962) has prompted suspicions that he was under orders not to win these events. Taylor Kingston concludes that: there was probably no pressure from Soviet officials, since from 1954 onwards, Keres was rehabilitated and Botvinnik was no longer in favour with officials. At Curaçao 1962, there was an unofficial conspiracy by Petrosian, Geller and Keres, and this worked out to Keres' disadvantage, since he may have been slightly stronger than both Petrosian and Geller at this stage. Bronstein, in his final book, published just after his death in late 2006, wrote that the Soviet chess leadership favoured Smyslov to win Zurich 1953, and pressured several of the other top Soviets to arrange this outcome, which did in fact occur. Bronstein wrote that Keres was ordered to draw his second cycle game with Smyslov, to conserve Smyslov's fading physical strength; Keres, who still had his own hopes of winning the event, tried as White to win an attacking game, but instead lost because of Smyslov's excellent play.

== Three-time champion of USSR ==
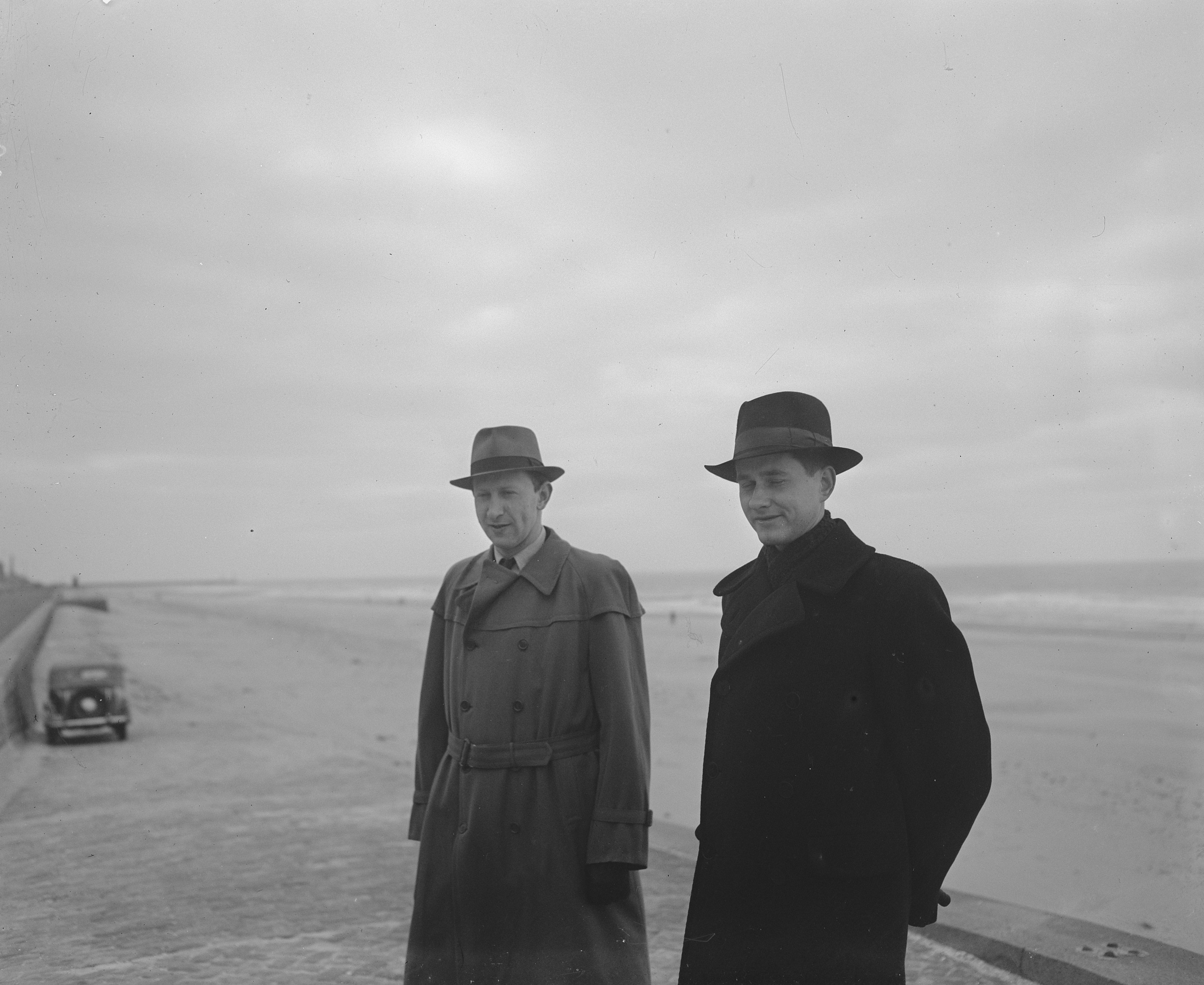
Keres (right) with Vassily Smyslov in The Hague at the World Chess Championship 1948

In several other post-war events, however, Keres dominated the field. He won the exceptionally strong USSR Chess Championship three times. In 1947, he won at Leningrad, URS-ch15, with 14/19 (+10−1=8); the field included every top Soviet player except Botvinnik. In 1950, he won at Moscow, URS-ch18, with 11½/17 (+8−2=7) against a field which was only slightly weaker than in 1947. Then in 1951, he triumphed again at Moscow, URS-ch19, with 12/17 (+9−2=6), against a super-class field which included Efim Geller, Petrosian, Smyslov, Botvinnik, Yuri Averbakh, David Bronstein, Mark Taimanov, Lev Aronin, Salo Flohr, Igor Bondarevsky, and Alexander Kotov.

Keres won Pärnu 1947 with 9½/13 (+7−1=5), Szczawno-Zdrój 1950 with 14½/19 (+11−1=7), and Budapest 1952 with 12½/17 (+10−2=5), the latter ahead of world champion Botvinnik and an all-star field which included Geller, Smyslov, Gideon Ståhlberg, László Szabo, and Petrosian. The Budapest victory, which capped a stretch of four first-class wins over a two-year span, may represent the peak of his career. The Hungarian master and writer Egon Varnusz, in his books on Keres, states that at this time, "The best player in the world was Paul Keres".

== International team successes ==
Keres represented the Soviet Union in seven consecutive Olympiads, winning seven consecutive team gold medals, five board gold medals, and one bronze board medal. Of note was his appearance on board one for the USSR in 1952, when the Soviets entered the event for the first time; Keres was the only Soviet team member with Olympiad experience (from his previous appearances for Estonia), and world champion Mikhail Botvinnik was not on the Soviet team. His four straight board gold medals from 1954 to 1960 is an Olympiad record. Although not selected after 1964, Keres served successfully as a team trainer with Soviet international teams for the next decade. Altogether, in 11 Olympiads, playing for both the USSR and Estonia (counting the unofficial Munich 1936 event), and in 161 games, Keres accumulated a brilliant total of (+97−13=51), for 76.1%. His detailed 1952–1964 Olympiad results are:

- Helsinki 1952, USSR board 1, 6½/12, team gold;
- Amsterdam 1954, USSR board 4, 13½/14 (+13−0=1), team gold, board gold, best overall score;
- Moscow 1956, USSR board 3, 9½/12 (+7−0=5), team gold, board gold;
- Munich 1958, USSR board 3, 9½/12 (+7−0=5), team gold, board gold;
- Leipzig 1960, USSR board 3, 10½/13 (+8−0=5), team gold, board gold;
- Varna 1962, USSR board 4, 9½/13 (+6−0=7), team gold, board bronze;
- Tel Aviv 1964, USSR board 4, 10/12 (+9−1=2), team gold, board gold.

Keres also appeared three times for the Soviet Union in the European Team Championships, winning team and individual gold medals on all three occasions. He scored 14/18 (+10−0=8), for 77.8%. His detailed Euroteams results are:

- Vienna 1957, USSR board 2, 3/5 (+1−0=4), team gold, board gold;
- Oberhausen 1961, USSR board 3, 6/8 (+4−0=4), team gold, board gold;
- Kapfenberg 1970, USSR board 8, 5/5 (+5−0=0), team gold, board gold.

Keres also represented the USSR in many international team matches, in Europe and the Americas, with great success. He represented Estonia on top board with distinction in Soviet team championships, contested between regions.

== Later career ==
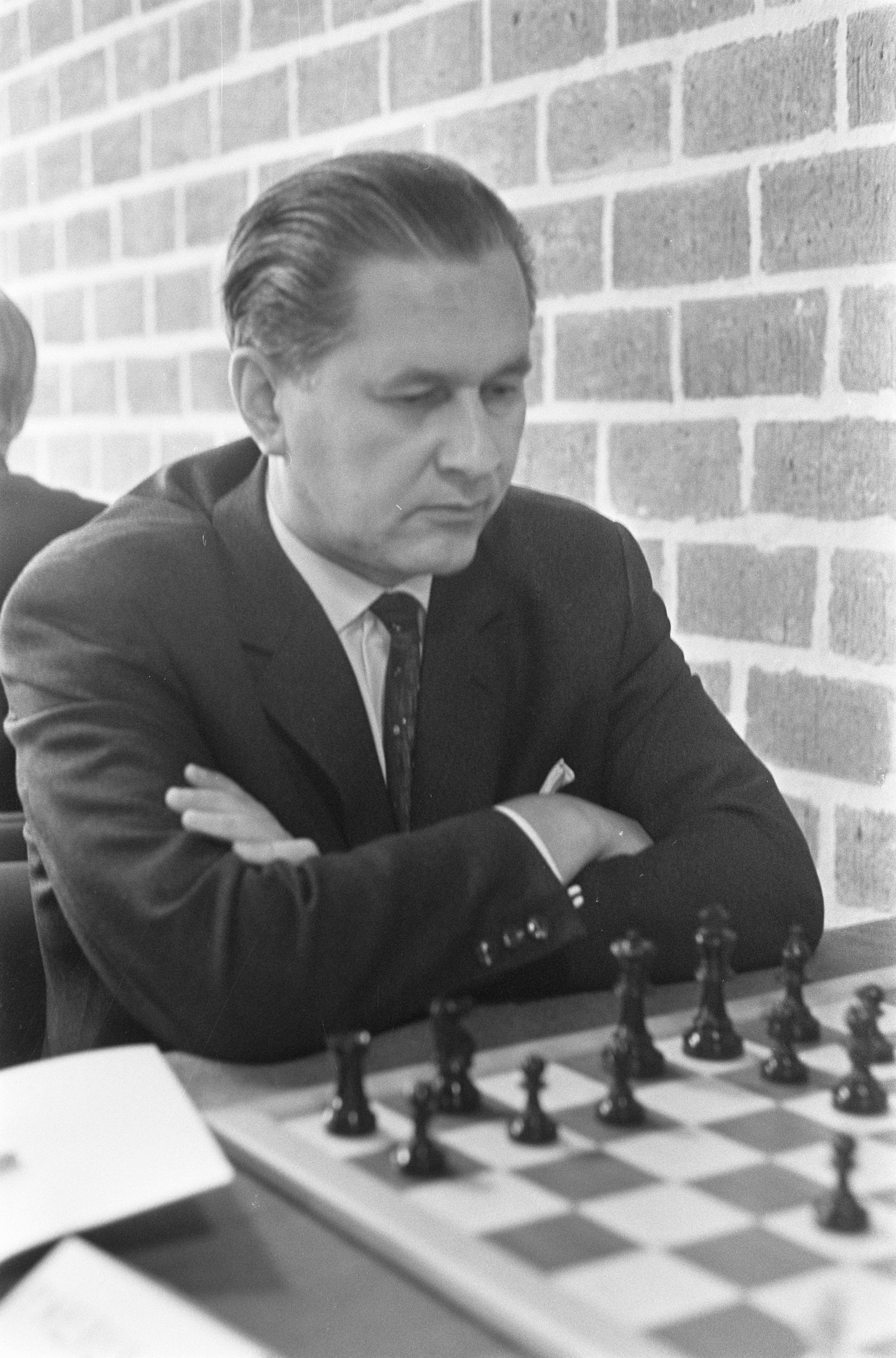
Keres at the Hoogovens Tournament in Wijk aan Zee in 1969

Beginning with the Pärnu 1947 tournament, Keres made some significant contributions as a chess organizer in Estonia; this is an often overlooked aspect of his career.

Keres continued to play exceptionally well on the international circuit. He tied 1st–2nd at Hastings 1954–55 with Smyslov on 7/9 (+6−1=2). He dominated an internal Soviet training tournament at Pärnu 1955 with 9½/10. Keres placed 2nd at the 1955 Gothenburg Interzonal, behind David Bronstein, with 13½/20. Keres defeated Wolfgang Unzicker in a 1956 exhibition match at Hamburg by 6–2 (+4−0=4). He tied 2nd–3rd in the USSR Championship, Moscow 1957 (URS-ch24) with 13½/21 (+8−2=11), along with Bronstein, behind Mikhail Tal. Keres won Mar del Plata 1957 (15/17, ahead of Miguel Najdorf), and Santiago 1957 with 6/7, ahead of Alexander Kotov. He won Hastings 1957–58 (7½/9, ahead of Svetozar Gligorić). He was tied 3rd–4th at Zurich 1959, at 10½/15, along with Bobby Fischer, behind Tal and Gligorić. He placed tied 7–8th in the USSR Championship, Tbilisi 1959 (URS-ch26) with 10½/19, as Petrosian won. Keres was third at Stockholm 1959–60 with 7/9. He won at Pärnu 1960 with 12/15. He was the champion at Zurich 1961 (9/11, ahead of Petrosian). At the elite Bled 1961 event, Keres shared 3rd–5th places, on 12½/19 (+7−1=11), behind Mikhail Tal and Bobby Fischer. In the USSR Championship, Baku 1961 (URS-ch29), Keres scored 11/20 for a shared 8–11th place, as Boris Spassky won. Keres shared first with World Champion Tigran Petrosian at the very strong 1963 Piatigorsky Cup in Los Angeles with 8½/14.

Further tournament championships followed. He won Beverwijk 1964, with 11½/15, tied with Iivo Nei. He shared first place with World Champion Tigran Petrosian at Buenos Aires 1964, with 12½/17. He won at Hastings 1964–65 with 8/9. He shared 1st–2nd places at Mariánské Lázně 1965 on 11/15 with Vlastimil Hort. In the USSR Championship at Tallinn 1965 (URS-ch33), he scored 11/19 for 6th place, as Leonid Stein won. He won at Stockholm 1966–67 with 7/9. At Winnipeg 1967, he shared 3rd–4th places on 5½/9 as Bent Larsen and Klaus Darga won.

At Bamberg 1968, he won with 12/15, two points ahead of World Champion Tigran Petrosian. He was 2nd at Luhacovice 1969 with 10½/15, behind Viktor Korchnoi. At Tallinn 1969, he shared 2nd–3rd places on 9/13 as Stein won. At Wijk aan Zee 1969, he shared 3rd–4th places on 10½/15, as Geller and Botvinnik won. He won Budapest 1970 with 10/15, ahead of Laszlo Szabo. Also in 1970, Keres's 3:1 win over Borislav Ivkov on the tenth board at Belgrade gave victory to the Soviet team in the match vs Rest of the World. He shared 1st–2nd at Tallinn 1971 with Mikhail Tal on 11½/15. He shared 2nd–3rd at Pärnu 1971, on 9½/13, as Stein won. He shared 2nd–4th at Amsterdam 1971 with 9/13, as Smyslov won. He shared 3rd–5th places at Sarajevo 1972 on 9½/15, as Szabo won. He placed 5th at San Antonio 1972 on 9½/15, as Petrosian, Lajos Portisch, and Anatoly Karpov won.

At Tallinn 1973, he shared 3rd–6th places on 9/15, as Mikhail Tal won. His last Interzonal was Petropolis 1973, where he scored 8/17 for a shared 12–13th place, as Henrique Mecking won. That same year, he made his last Soviet Championship appearance, at Moscow for URS-ch41, scoring 8/17 for a shared 9–12th place, as Spassky won.

== Death ==
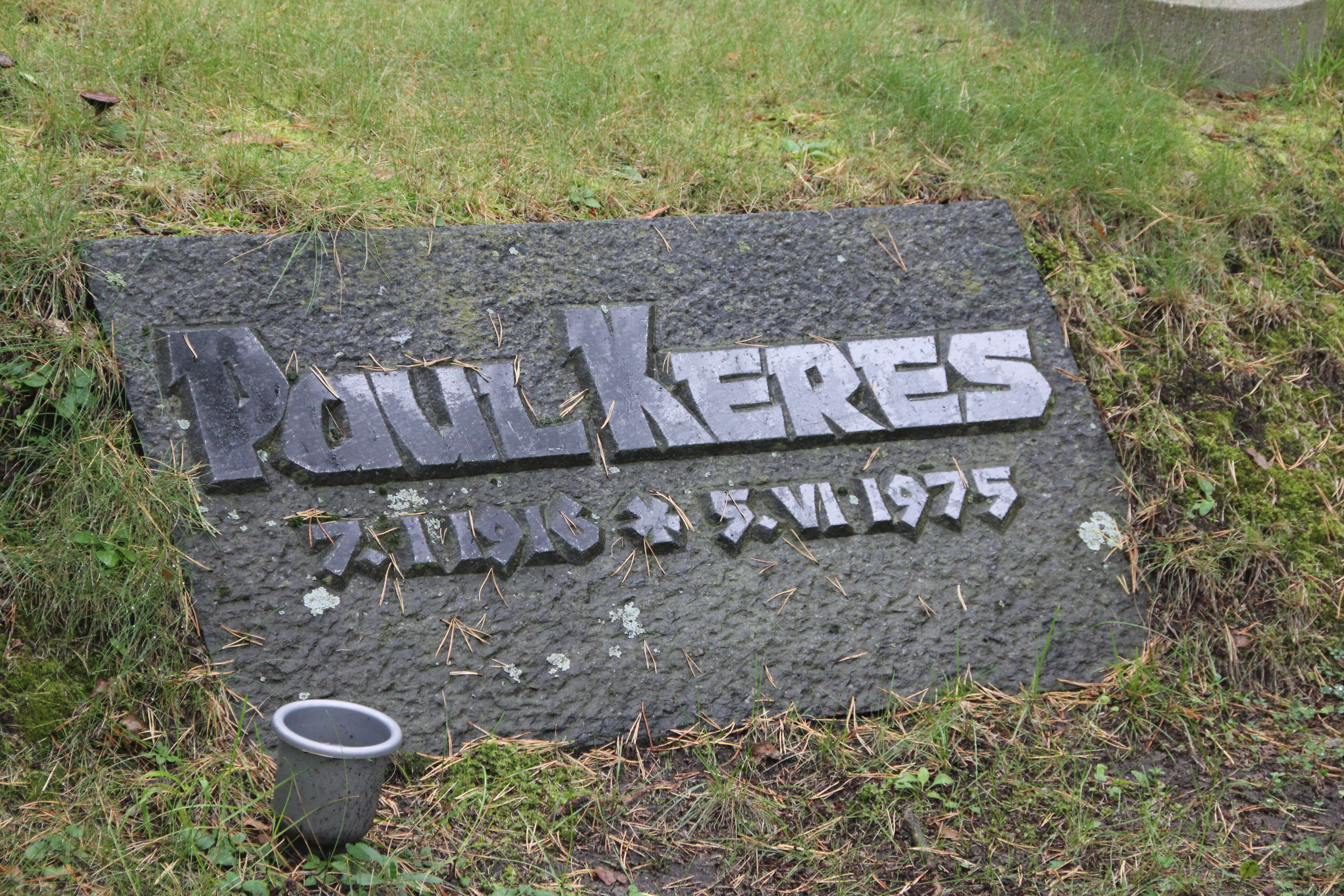
Grave of Paul Keres at Forest Cemetery in Tallinn

Keres' health declined the next year, and he did not play any major events in 1974. His last major tournament win was Tallinn 1975, ahead of Spassky and Friðrik Ólafsson, just a few months before his death.

Keres died of a heart attack in Helsinki, Finland, at the age of 59 (it is often erroneously reported that he died on the same date in Vancouver, Canada). His death occurred while returning to Estonia from a Swiss system tournament in Vancouver, which he had won. Prior to the Vancouver event, Keres, then 59, had completed a cross-country tour of Canada, giving exhibitions in Montreal, Ottawa, Kingston, Ontario, and Toronto; this tour was organized by Estonian-Canadian organizer Kalev Pugi of Kingston, president of the Canadian Chess Federation. Keres was buried at Metsakalmistu cemetery in Tallinn. The Paul Keres Memorial Tournaments have been held annually, mainly in Vancouver and Tallinn, ever since.

Over 100,000 were in attendance at Keres' funeral in Tallinn, Estonia; and FIDE President Max Euwe, his old friend and rival, was also present.

== Memory and memorials ==
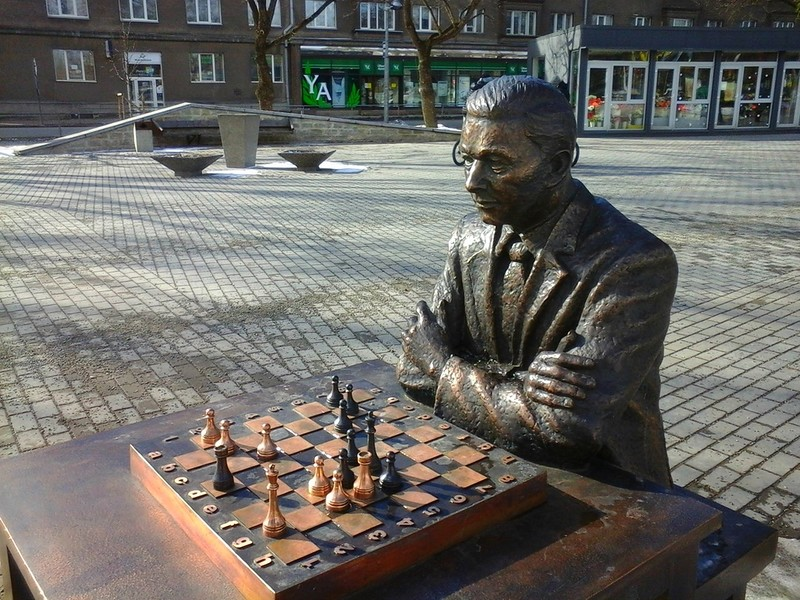
Statue of Paul Keres in his birthtown Narva

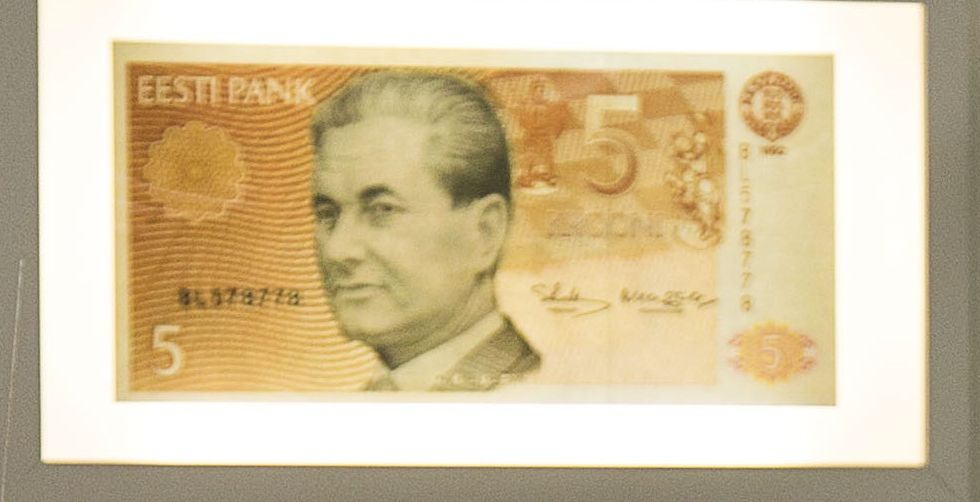
Keres depicted on the Estonian 5-kroon banknote (in circulation 1992–2011)

A statue honouring him is located in Tõnismägi, Tallinn. A bronze statue of Keres was unveiled on his 100th birthday in his birthtown Narva on 7 January 2016. Streets in Nõmme, a district of Tallinn, in Narva and Pärnu are named after him.

An annual international chess tournament has been held in Tallinn every other year since 1969. Keres won this tournament in 1971 and 1975. Starting in 1976 after Keres' death, it has been called the Paul Keres Memorial Tournament. There are also the annual Keres Memorial tournament held in Vancouver and a number of chess clubs and festivals named after him.

In November 1999, Keres was voted the Estonian Sportsperson of the Century. He is the only Estonian to be depicted on currency twice — on the 5 krooni banknote issued in 1991, and on a 2 euro commemorative coin issued in 2016 for his 100th birth anniversary.

The World Chess Federation named 2016 as "The Year of Paul Keres".

== Legacy and writings ==
The unofficial Chessmetrics system places Keres in the top 10 players in the world between approximately 1936 and 1965, and overall he had one of the highest winning percentages of all grandmasters in history. He has the seventh highest Chessmetrics 20-year average, from 1944 to 1963, behind five World Champions and Victor Korchnoi.

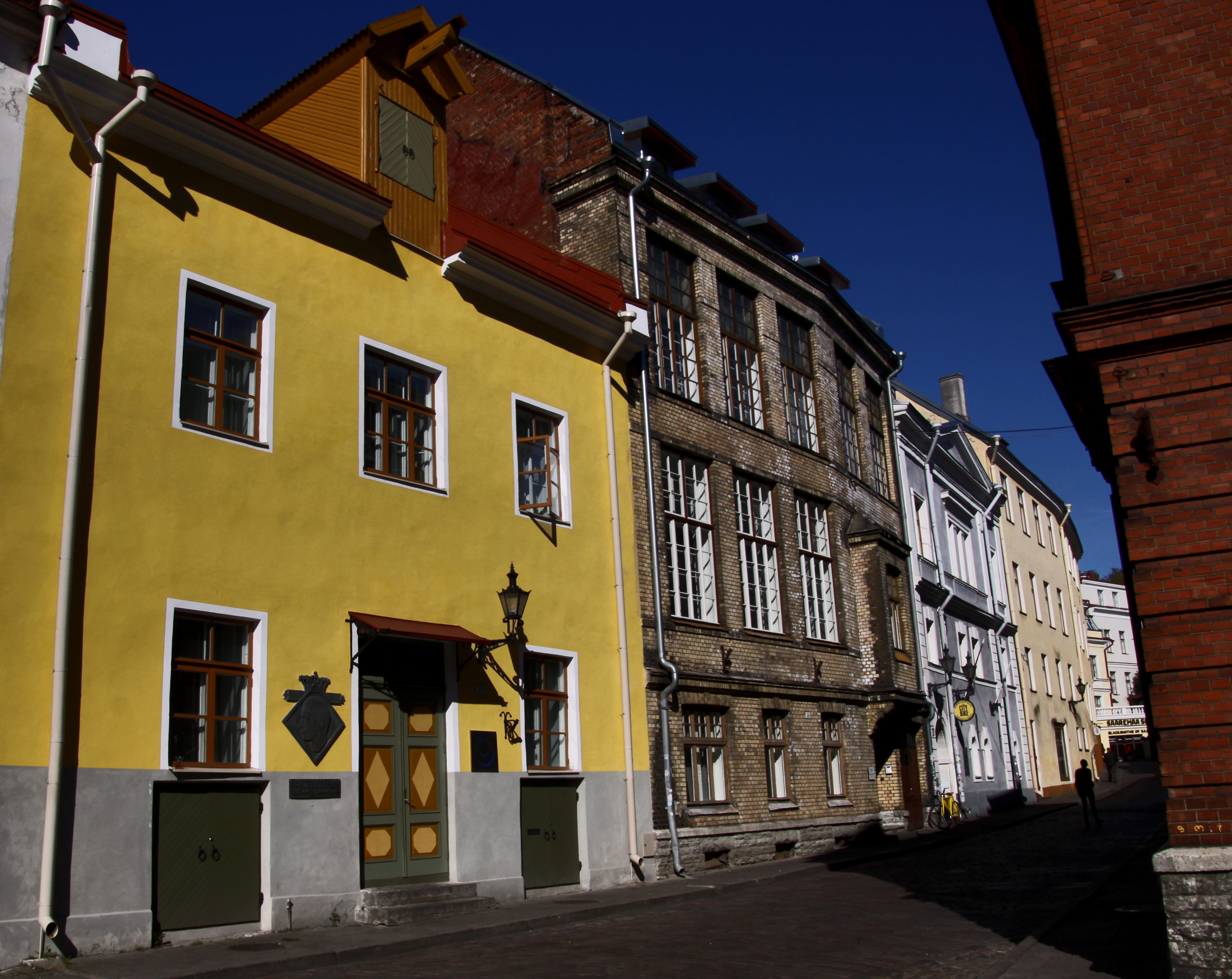
The Paul Keres Chess House (on the left, with commemorative plaque) in Tallinn Old Town

He was one of few players to have plus records against Capablanca, Euwe and Tal, and he also had equal records against Smyslov, Petrosian and Anatoly Karpov. In his long career, he played 10 world champions. He won at least one game against all from Capablanca to Bobby Fischer (his two games with Karpov were drawn), making him one of only three players to beat nine undisputed world champions (the other two are Victor Korchnoi and Alexander Beliavsky). Other notable grandmasters against whom he had plus records include Reuben Fine, Salo Flohr, Viktor Korchnoi, Efim Geller, Savielly Tartakower, Mark Taimanov, Milan Vidmar, Svetozar Gligorić, Isaac Boleslavsky, Efim Bogoljubov and Bent Larsen.

He wrote chess books that included a well-regarded, deeply annotated collection of his best games, Grandmaster of Chess ISBN 0-668-02645-6, The Art of the Middle Game (with Alexander Kotov) ISBN 0-486-26154-9, and Practical Chess Endings ISBN 0-7134-4210-7. All three books are still considered among the best of their kind for aspiring masters and experts. He also wrote several tournament books, including an account of the 1948 World Championship Match Tournament. He authored several openings treatises, often in German: Spanisch bis Französisch, Dreispringer bis Königsgambit ISBN 4871875431, and Vierspringer bis Spanisch. He contributed to the first volume, 'C', of the first edition of the Yugoslav-published Encyclopaedia of Chess Openings (ECO), which appeared in 1974. Keres also co-founded the Riga magazine Shakhmaty.

Keres made many important contributions to opening theory. Perhaps best-known is the Keres Attack against the Scheveningen Variation of the Sicilian Defence (1.e4 c5 2.Nf3 d6 3.d4 cxd4 4.Nxd4 Nf6 5.Nc3 e6 6.g4), which was successfully introduced against Efim Bogoljubow at Salzburg 1943, and remains an important line. An original system on the Black side of the Closed Ruy Lopez (1.e4 e5 2.Nf3 Nc6 3.Bb5 a6 4.Ba4 Nf6 5.0-0 Be7 6.Re1 b5 7.Bb3 d6 8.c3 0-0 9.h3 Na5 10.Bc2 c5 11.d4 Nd7) was introduced by Keres at the 1962 Candidates' tournament, and was popular for several years. He also popularized the Keres Defence (1.d4 e6 2.c4 Bb4+) and a system on the Black side of the English Opening that runs 1.c4 e5 2.Nc3 Nf6 3.g3 c6.

Keres published 180 problems and 30 studies, including a rook ending that won a first prize in 1947."

Keres won top-class tournaments from the mid-1930s into the mid-1970s, a span of 40 years, and won major events in western Europe, eastern Europe, the Soviet Union, South America, and North America. Botvinnik, by contrast, never competed in the Americas during his career.

His rival Samuel Reshevsky said that Keres failed to become world champion because he lacked a killer instinct and "was too mild a person to give his all in order to defeat his opponents. He took everything, including his chess, philosophically. Keres is one of the nicest people that I have ever had the pleasure of meeting. With his friendly and sincere smile, he makes friends easily. He is goodnatured and kind. Yes, he loves chess, but being a human being is his first consideration. In addition to chess, Keres was interested in tennis, ping-pong, swimming, and bridge."

== Books ==
- Keres, Paul; Kotov, Alexander. The Art of the Middle Game. Penguin Books. ISBN 978-0-486-26154-6.
- Keres, Paul (1973). Practical Chess Endings. R.H.M. Press. ISBN 0-89058-028-6.
- Keres, Paul. Keres' Best Games of Chess. Ishi Press. ISBN 4871875482.
- Keres, Paul. Moderne Theorie der Schacheröffnungen Dreispringerspiel bis Königsgambit. Ishi Press. ISBN 4871875431.
- Keres, Paul. Теория шахматных дебютов Открытые дебюты. Ishi Press. ISBN 4871875474.
- Keres, Paul (2012). The Early Games of Paul Keres Chess Grandmaster. Ishi Press. ISBN 978-4871875400.
- Keres, Paul (1966). Grandmaster of Chess: The Middle Years of Paul Keres. Arco Publishing. ISBN 978-4871875417.
- Keres, Paul (2012). The Later Years of Paul Keres Chess Grandmaster. Ishi Press. ISBN 978-4871875424.

== Notable games ==
- Keres vs. Alexander Alekhine, Margate 1937, Ruy Lopez, Modern Steinitz Defence (C71), 1–0. Here Keres outplayed Alekhine already in the first 15 moves. The game is crowned by two small combinations.
- Keres vs. José Raúl Capablanca, AVRO Amsterdam 1938, French Defence, Tarrasch Variation (C09), 1–0. Almost unpredictable jumps of the white knight slowly destroy Black's position. A beautiful tactical game.
- Max Euwe vs. Keres, Amsterdam 1940 (match), Queen's Indian Defence, Old main line (E19), 0–1. Black reveals a series of brilliant tactical surprise moves, concluding elegantly against the former world champion.
- Keres vs. Jaroslav Šajtar, Amsterdam 1954 (ol), Sicilian Defence, Najdorf Variation (B94), 1–0. A typical Sicilian sacrifice on e6 leads to swift resignation.
- Keres vs. Mikhail Botvinnik, Moscow 1956 (Alekhine Memorial), Sicilian Defence, Classical Variation, Richter–Rauzer Attack (B63), 1–0. Keres had a minus score against Botvinnik, but here he defeats the world champion in convincing positional style.
- Keres vs. Edgar Walther, Tel Aviv 1964, King's Indian Defence, Petrosian Variation, Keres Variation (E93), 1–0. The game in which Keres introduced a new plan against the King's Indian: Bg5, h4, Nh2 and a sacrifice on g4.

== Tournament and match record ==
Keres' tournament and match record:

=== Tournaments ===
Year	Tournament	Place	Notes
1935	Warsaw 6th Olympiad	–	+11−5=3 on first board for Estonia
1935	Helsinki	2	Frydman won
1936	Nauheim	1–2	shared 1–2 with Alekhine
1936	Dresden	8–9	Alekhine won
1936	Zandvoort	3–4	Fine won
1937	Margate	1–2	shared 1–2 with Fine
1937	Ostend	1–3	shared 1–3 with Grob and Fine
1937	Prague	1	ahead of Zinner
1937	Vienna	1	Quadrangular
1937	Kemeri	4–5	Reshevsky, Flohr, and Petrovs shared 1st–3rd
1937	Pärnu	2–4	Schmidt won
1937	Stockholm 7th Olympiad	–	individual silver (+9−2=4) on first board for Estonia
1937	Semmering/Baden	1	ahead of Fine
1937/38	Hastings	2–3	Reshevsky won
1938	Noordwijk	2	Eliskases won
1938	AVRO	1–2	shared 1–2 with Fine, ahead of Botvinnik
1939	Leningrad–Moscow	12–13	Flohr won
1939	Margate	1	ahead of Capablanca and Flohr
1939	Buenos Aires 8th Olympiad	–	+12−2=5 on first board for bronze medal winning Estonia
1939	Buenos Aires	1–2	shared 1–2 with Najdorf
1940	12th USSR Championship	4	Lilienthal and Bondarevsky won
1941	Absolute USSR Championship	2	behind Botvinnik
1942	Tallinn	1	Estonian Championship +15−0=0
1942	Salzburg	2	behind Alekhine
1942	Munich	2	"European Championship", behind Alekhine
1943	Prague	2	behind Alekhine
1943	Poznań	1	ahead of Grünfeld
1943	Salzburg	1–2	shared 1–2 with Alekhine
1943	Tallinn	1	Estonian Championship +6−1=4
1943	Madrid	1	
1944	Lidköping	2	Swedish Championship
1944/45	Riga	1	Baltic Championship
1946	Tbilisi	1	Georgian Championship
1947	Pärnu	1	
1947	15th USSR Championship	1	
1947	Moscow	6–7	
1948	World Championship Tournament	3–4	Botvinnik 1st, Smyslov 2nd
1949	17th USSR Championship	8	
1950	Budapest	4	Candidates Tournament, Bronstein and Boleslavsky 1st–2nd, Smyslov 3rd
1950	Szczawno-Zdrój	1	
1950	18th USSR Championship	1	
1951	19th USSR Championship	1	
1952	20th USSR Championship	10–11	Botvinnik won
1952	Budapest	1	
1952	Helsinki 10th Olympiad	–	+3−2=7 on first board for gold medal USSR team
1953	Zurich	2–4	Candidates Tournament, Smyslov 1st
1954	Amsterdam 11th Olympiad	–	individual gold (+13−0=1) on fourth board for gold medal USSR team
1954/55	Hastings	1–2	shared 1–2 with Smyslov
1955	22nd USSR Championship	7–8	Geller won
1955	Gothenburg	2	Interzonal, Bronstein won
1956	Amsterdam	2	Candidates Tournament, Smyslov won
1956	Moscow 12th Olympiad	–	individual gold (+7−0=5) on third board for gold medal USSR team
1956	Moscow	7–8	
1957	24th USSR Championship	2–3	Tal won
1957	Mar del Plata	1	
1957	Santiago	1	
1957/58	Hastings	1	
1958	Munich 13th Olympiad	–	individual gold (+7−0=5) on third board for gold medal USSR team
1959	26th USSR Championship	7–8	Petrosian won
1959	Zurich	3–4	Tal won
1959	Bled/Belgrade/Zagreb	2	Candidates Tournament, Tal won
1959/60	Stockholm	3	
1960	Leipzig 14th Olympiad	–	individual gold (+8−0=5) on third board for gold medal USSR team
1961	Zurich	1	
1961	Bled	3–5	Tal won
1961	29th USSR Championship	8–11	
1962	Curaçao	2–3	1962 Candidates Tournament, Petrosian won
1962	Varna 15th Olympiad	−	individual bronze (+6−0=7) on fourth board on gold medal USSR team
1963	Los Angeles	1–2	1st Piatigorsky Cup, tied with Petrosian for first
1964	Beverwijk	1–2	Hoogovens tournament, shared 1–2 with Nei
1964	Buenos Aires	1–2	shared 1–2 with Petrosian
1964	Tel Aviv 16th Olympiad	−	individual gold (+9−1=2) on fourth board for gold medal USSR team
1964/65	Hastings	1	
1965	Mariánské Lázně	1–2	shared 1–2 with Hort
1965	33rd USSR Championship	6	Stein won
1966/67	Stockholm	1	
1967	Moscow	9–12	
1967	Winnipeg	3–4	
1968	Bamberg	1	
1969	Beverwijk	3–4	Hoogovens tournament, behind Botvinnik and Geller
1969	Tallinn	2–3	
1970	Budapest	1	
1971	Amsterdam	2–4	
1971	Pärnu	2–3	
1971	Tallinn	1-2	with Tal
1972	Sarajevo	3–5	
1972	San Antonio	5	Karpov, Petrosian, and Portisch shared 1st–3rd
1973	Tallinn	3–6	
1973	Dortmund	6–7	
1973	Petropolis	12–13	Interzonal, Mecking 1st; Geller, Polugaevsky, and Portisch 2nd–4th
1973	41st USSR Championship	9–12	Spassky won
1975	Tallinn	1	
1975	Vancouver	1	

=== Matches ===
Year	Opponent	Result
1935	Gunnar Friedemann	+2−1=0
1935	Feliks Kibbermann	+3−1=0
1936	Paul Felix Schmidt	+3−3=1
1938	Gideon Ståhlberg	+2−2=4
1939/40	Max Euwe	+6−5=3
1944	Folke Ekström	+4−0=2
1956	Wolfgang Unzicker	+4−0=4
1962	Efim Geller	+2−1=5
1965	Boris Spassky	+2−4=4
1970	Borislav Ivkov	+2−0=2

=== Scores against other top grandmasters ===
Only official tournament or match games are accounted for.

- Alexander Alekhine: +1−5=8
- Mikhail Botvinnik: +3−8=9
- David Bronstein: +4−6=18
- José Raúl Capablanca: +1−0=5
- Max Euwe: +11−7=9
- Reuben Fine: +3−1=8
- Bobby Fischer: +3−4=3
- Efim Geller: +8−7=21
- Anatoly Karpov: +0−0=2
- Viktor Korchnoi: +4−1=12
- Bent Larsen: +2−0=4
- Tigran Petrosian: +3−3=27
- Lajos Portisch: +1−4=3
- Vasily Smyslov: +8−10=21
- Boris Spassky: +3−5=29
- Mikhail Tal: +8−4=20

Awards and achievements
Preceded by Uno Palu	Estonian Sportspersonality of the Year; 1959	Succeeded by Hanno Selg
Preceded by Toomas Leius	Estonian Sportspersonality of the Year; 1962	Succeeded by Toomas Leius

== Sources ==
- Keres, Paul. Harry Golombek (ed.). Grandmaster of Chess: The Complete Games of Paul Keres. Arco, New York, 1977.
- Varnusz, Egon. Paul Keres' Best Games, Volume 1: Closed Games. Cadogan Chess, London, 1994, ISBN 1-85744-064-1.
- Paul Keres Best Games, Volume II: Semi-Open Games, by Egon Varnusz, London 1994, Cadogan Chess, ISBN 0-08-037139-6.
- Paul Keres: der Komponist = the Composer, by Alexander Hildebrand, F. Chlubna, Vienna, 1999.
- Peeter Järvelaid. Paul Keres ja Boris Meissner. – Pärnu Postimees, 8. jaanuar 2011, lk. 11. http://www.parnupostimees.ee/?id=368933
