= Smyslov =

Smyslov (masculine, Russian: Смыслов) or Smyslova (feminine, Russian: Смыслова) is a Russian surname. Notable people with the surname include:

- Vasily Osipovich Smyslov (1881–1943), Russian chess master and the father of Vasily Vasilievich Smyslov
- Vasily Vasilyevich Smyslov (1921–2010), Soviet Russian chess grandmaster and World Chess Champion (1957–1958)
- Anton Smyslov (born 1979), Russian footballer

== See also ==
- 5413 Smyslov, a main-belt asteroid
