= Vladislav Vinogradov =

Soviet military leader (1899–1962)

Vladislav Petrovich Vinogradov
- Владислав Петрович Виноградов
- Born: 29 August 1899; Kazan Governorate, Russian Empire
- Died: 13 April 1962 (aged 62); Moscow, USSR
- Military career
- Allegiance: Russian Empire; Soviet Union
- Branch: Army
- Rank: General-lieutenant
- Conflicts: World War I Russian Civil War; World War II
- Awards: Order of Lenin

Vladislav Petrovich Vinogradov (Russian: Владислав Петрович Виноградов; 29 August 1899 in Kuznetsovo, Kazan Governorate – 13 April 1962) was a Soviet military leader.

== Biography ==
He fought in the First World War, Russian Civil War and Second World War and ended his military career Lieutenant General of the Quartermaster Corps.

From 10 to 12 September 1944, Vinogradov took part in negotiations on an armistice with Romania During the occupation of Romania he represented Rodion Malinovsky, nominal head of the Red Army-dominated Allied Commission for Romania.

In the post-war years, from May 31, 1946, to July 3, 1948, he served as Deputy Minister of Railways of the USSR, then as Chief of Staff of the Logistics of the USSR Armed Forces, and as Deputy Head of the Military Academy of Logistics and Supply for research and academic work.

After retiring, he continued to be active in public life. He made a significant contribution to the development of chess in the USSR and for a long time headed the chess federations of the USSR and the RSFSR.
