= Feliks Kibbermann =

Estonian chess player (1902–1993)

Feliks (Felix) Kibbermann (3 December 1902, in Rakvere – 27 December 1993, in Tartu) was an Estonian chess master, philologist of German, lexicographer, and pedagogue.

== Chess ==
Before World War II, he tied for 3rd-5th with Ilmar Raud and Viktor Uulberg in the 5th Estonian Championship at Tallinn 1933 (Gunnar Friedemann won), and lost a match to Paul Keres at Tallinn 1935 (+1 –3 =0). Kibbermann represented Estonia in the 6th Chess Olympiad at Warsaw 1935 (+2 –5 =2). In October 1937, he played in a training tournament in Tallinn (Keres won).

During the war, he shared first with Johannes Türn in 11th EST-ch at Tallinn 1941, but lost a play-off match for the title (+0 –3 =1). He participated in Estonian championships in 1942 and 1943, both won by Keres. In 1946, he tied for 11-12th in Tallinn (EST-ch, Raul Renter won).
