= Harald Keres =

Estonian physicist (1912–2010)

Harald Keres (15 November [O.S. 2 November] 1912, in Pärnu – 26 June 2010) was an Estonian physicist considered to be the father of the Estonian school of relativistic gravitation theory. In 1961 Keres became a member of the Estonian Academy of Sciences in the field of theoretical physics. In 1996 Keres was awarded the Order of the National Coat of Arms, Class III.

Keres was the elder brother of chess grandmaster Paul Keres (1916–1975). He told friendly jokes to his students: "I am not Paul's brother; Paul is my brother".
