= Anton Smyslov =

Russian footballer

Personal information
- Full name: Anton Aleksandrovich Smyslov
- Date of birth: 28 May 1979 (age 47)
- Place of birth: Leningrad, USSR
- Height: 1.97 m (6 ft 5 1/2 in)
- Position: Goalkeeper

Senior career*
Years	Team	Apps	(Gls)
1997	FC Zhemchuzhina-d Sochi	6	(0)
1998	FC Zhemchuzhina-2 Sochi	9	(0)
1999–2002	FC Lokomotiv Chita	25	(0)
2003	FC Petrotrest St. Petersburg	32	(0)
2004	FC Anzhi Makhachkala	2	(0)
2006–2007	FC Mordovia Saransk	51	(0)
2008–2009	FC Dynamo St. Petersburg	36	(0)
2010–2011	FC Gazovik Orenburg	22	(0)
2012	FC Dnepr Smolensk	3	(0)
2012–2013	FC Pskov-747	3	(0)
2013–2014	FC Tosno	1	(0)
2014–2016	FC Pskov-747	17	(0)
- * Club domestic league appearances and goals

Anton Aleksandrovich Smyslov (Russian: Антон Александрович Смыслов; born 28 May 1979) is a former Russian professional football player.

== Club career ==
He made his Russian Football National League debut for FC Lokomotiv Chita on 11 May 1999 in a game against PFC Spartak Nalchik. He played 7 seasons in the FNL for Lokomotiv, FC Anzhi Makhachkala, FC Mordovia Saransk and FC Gazovik Orenburg.
