= Alexander Kotov =

Soviet chess grandmaster (1913–1981)

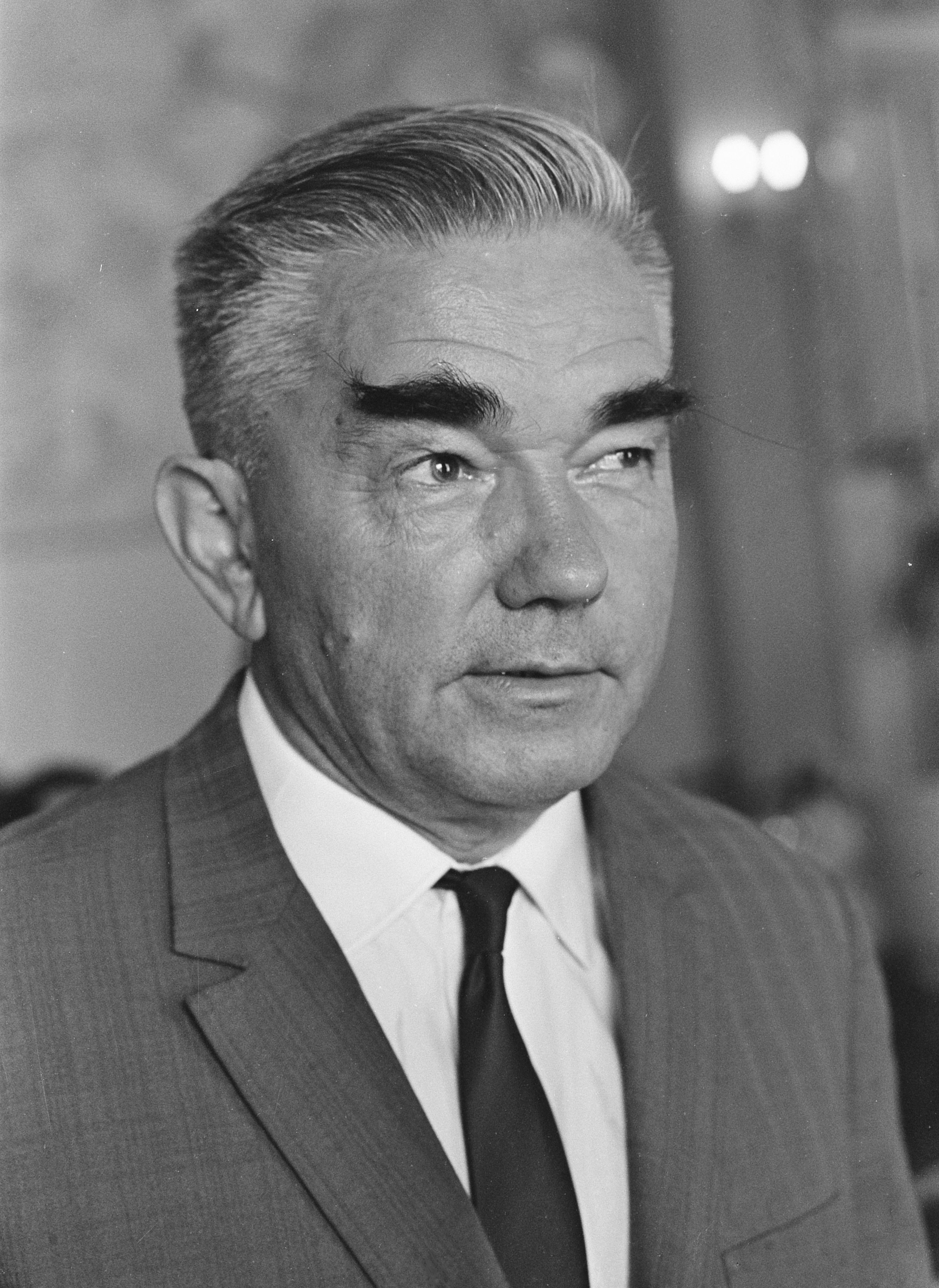
- Kotov in 1967

Personal information
- Born: Alexander Alexandrovich Kotov; 12 August 1913 Tula, Russian Empire
- Died: 8 January 1981 (aged 67) Moscow, Soviet Union

Chess career
- Country: Soviet Union
- Title: Grandmaster (1950)
- Peak rating: 2510 (July 1971)

Alexander Alexandrovich Kotov (Алекса́ндр Алекса́ндрович Ко́тов; (12 August [O.S. 30 July] 1913 – 8 January 1981) was a Soviet chess grandmaster and author. He was a Soviet chess champion, a two-time world title Candidate, and a prolific writer on the subject of chess. Kotov served in high posts in the Soviet Chess Federation, and wrote most of his books during the Cold War. The importance and breadth of Kotov's work rank him among the all-time greats in this field.

== Early life ==
Kotov was born in Tula, which was part of the Russian Empire, to a large working class family. He moved to Moscow in 1939 to study engineering, and during this time studied chess a great deal.

== Chess career ==
While best remembered today as an author, Kotov also had a number of good results as a player. One of his best early results was his second-place finish in the 1939 USSR Championship, in which he just missed out to Mikhail Botvinnik in the final round. This result won him the Soviet Grandmaster title, the third Soviet player to hold the title after Botvinnik and Grigory Levenfish. Kotov was Moscow champion in 1941. He won the Soviet title jointly with David Bronstein in 1948, and won at Venice in 1950, ahead of Vasily Smyslov.

The first ever Candidates Tournament of 1950—which determined who would challenge the World Champion (then, Botvinnik)—was held in Budapest. Kotov scored 8½/18. He had qualified for the event by finishing fourth in the 1948 Interzonal Tournament in Stockholm, scoring 11½/19. He was granted the title of International Grandmaster in 1950 (inauguration year) by the World Chess Federation, and held posts in the Soviet Chess Federation at the time.

What was perhaps Kotov's best result came at the 1952 Saltsjöbaden Interzonal, which he won with a score of 16½/20, three clear points ahead of Tigran Petrosian and Mark Taimanov in second place, and without losing a game. In the next Candidates Tournament in Zürich, he scored 14/28, and was the only person to win a game against the tournament's winner, Smyslov.

Kotov played for the USSR at the Chess Olympiads of 1952 and 1954, contributing to team gold medal victories. He was the second reserve board both times; at Helsinki 1952 he scored 2/3, while at Amsterdam 1954, he made 4/6. After 1960, all the tournaments in which he competed took place outside the USSR. They included a shared first place with Svetozar Gligorić at Hastings in 1962, half a point ahead of Smyslov. Kotov played in very few tournaments in his later years.

== Writings ==
Kotov frequently praised the Soviet political system in his books. For example, the 1958 book The Soviet School of Chess (co-written with Mikhail Yudovich) stated that "The rise of the Soviet school to the summit of world chess is a logical result of socialist cultural development." At the time, statements such as this were so controversial that Western publishers felt compelled to include disclaimers in translations of his books for English-speaking markets. Dover Publications' 1961 paperback version of The Soviet School of Chess was distributed primarily to Western countries, and included an introduction that read, in part:

Literature of this type, though helpful in our ultimate understanding of the game, is very often riddled with distortion. The publishers of this Dover edition are very much concerned that readers be aware of the propaganda techniques employed, even in the history of chess, by the Soviet Union.

Kotov was even described as a KGB agent by Fedir Bohatyrchuk, in his 1978 book My Way to General Vlasov.

Notwithstanding Kotov's forays into the political realm, his books were insightful and informative and were written in a congenial style. He often made his points by citing first-hand stories of incidents involving famous grandmasters, most of whom he knew personally. In addition, he did not hesitate to be self-deprecating if he could make a point more vividly. Think Like a Grandmaster illustrates several situations where his opponents got the better of him; in one case, his catastrophic blunder converted a certain win into an instant loss. Such entertaining and enlightening personal accounts helped to ensure that his books remained popular among chess players of widely varying nationalities and playing strengths.

Kotov was a great admirer of World Champion Alexander Alekhine, and wrote a comprehensive four-volume biographical series of books on his life and career titled Shakhmatnoe Nasledie A.A. Alekhina, which were published between 1953 and 1958 and translated into Czech, German, Serbian and Spanish. The work significantly contributed to Alekhine's rehabilitation in the Soviet Union.

His trilogy of books Think Like a Grandmaster, Play Like a Grandmaster, and Train Like a Grandmaster are his best known, with Think Like a Grandmaster, which was translated from the Russian by Bernard Cafferty and published by Batsford in 1971, being particularly famous. The book is not concerned with advising where pieces should be placed on the board, or tactical motifs, but rather with the method of thinking that should be employed during a game. Kotov's advice to identify candidate moves and methodically examine them to build up an "analysis tree" remains well known today.

Kotov contributed to the Yugoslav series Encyclopedia of Chess Openings (ECO), which began in 1974, and to the associated games book series Chess Informant as an analyst.

=== "Kotov syndrome" ===
In Kotov's 1971 book Think Like a Grandmaster, he described a situation when a player thinks very hard for a long time in a complicated position but does not find a clear path, then, running low on time, quickly makes a poor move, often a blunder.

== Books authored ==
- Alexander Alekhine by Alexander Kotov, four volumes, Moscow, 1953–1958.
- The Art of the Middle Game, by Paul Keres and Alexander Kotov (translated from the Russian by Harry Golombek), London, Dover 1962, ISBN 0-486-26154-9
- Think Like a Grandmaster, by Alexander Kotov (translated from the Russian by Bernard Cafferty), London, Batsford 1971, (Algebraic Edition 2003) ISBN 0-7134-7885-3
- Play Like a Grandmaster, by Alexander Kotov (translated from the Russian by Bernard Cafferty), London, Batsford 1973, {Algebraic Edition 2003} ISBN 0-7134-1807-9
- World Championship Interzonals: Leningrad—Petropolis 1973, by R.G. Wade, L.S. Blackstock, and Alexander Kotov, New York, RHM Chess Publishing 1974, ISBN 0-213-42851-2
- Train Like a Grandmaster, by Alexander Kotov (translated from the Russian by Bernard Cafferty), London, Batsford 1981, ISBN 0-7134-3609-3
- Chess Tactics, by Alexander Kotov (translated from the Russian and edited by John Littlewood), London, Batsford 1983, ISBN 0-7134-2562-8
- Grandmaster at Work, by Alexander Kotov (first English edition), Macon, American Chess Promotions 1990, ISBN 0-939298-86-4
- The Soviet School of Chess, by Alexander Kotov and Mikhail Yudovich, Los Angeles, University Press of the Pacific 2001, ISBN 0-89875-415-1
- The Science of Strategy, by Alexander Kotov, Quality Chess Europe, 2019, ISBN 978-1-78483-080-9

== Playing style ==
Kotov developed a sharp style, was definitely not afraid of complications on the chessboard, and willingly entered into them against even the greatest of opponents. He favoured the closed openings with White, and was very successful with the Sicilian Defence as Black.

== Notable games ==
Averbakh vs. Kotov, 1953

Position: f1 white rook, h2 white king, g2 white rook, f2 white bishop, e2 white knight, d2 white queen, b2 white pawn, a2 white pawn, h3 white pawn, f3 white pawn, f4 black pawn, e4 white pawn, c4 white pawn, e5 black pawn, d5 white pawn, c5 black pawn, a5 black pawn, f6 black rook, d6 black pawn, h7 black pawn, e7 black bishop, d7 black queen, b7 black pawn, h8 black king, g8 black knight, b8 black rook

Position after 30.Ne2. Kotov played the queen sacrifice 30...Qxh3+.
- Kotov vs. Alexander Tolush, Leningrad Championship 1938, Neo-Grünfeld Defence (ECO D76), 1–0. Tolush was a dangerous attacker, but he is the one subdued here.
- Kotov vs. Tigran Petrosian, USSR Championship, Moscow 1949, Queen's Gambit, Exchange Variation (D36), 1–0. Petrosian, later World Champion, loses a game he would never forget, falling into an opening trap and resigning in only 13 moves.
- Kotov vs. Paul Keres, Budapest Candidates Tournament 1950, Nimzo-Indian Defence, Saemisch Variation (E24), 1–0. Kotov was near the peak of his form, and dealt Keres a costly loss.
- Yuri Averbakh vs. Kotov, Zurich Candidates Tournament 1953, Old Indian Defence (A55), 0–1. Kotov's most famous game is one of the all-time greats of sacrificial chess, as Black gives up his queen for long-term pressure which eventually leads to a mating finish. This game won the 1st Brilliancy Prize (Russian: Beauty Prize, in Bronstein's book of the tournament) at Zurich, widely regarded as one of the very greatest chess tournaments ever held.
