= Egon Varnusz =

Hungarian chess player (1933–2008)

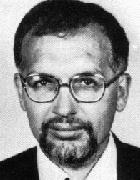

Personal information
- Born: November 15, 1933 Budapest, Hungary
- Died: 26 June 2008 (aged 74) Budapest, Hungary

Chess career
- Country: Hungary
- Title: FIDE Master (1983)
- Peak rating: 2415 (January 1975)

Egon Varnusz (born Budapest, Hungary, November 15, 1933 – Budapest, June 26, 2008) was a Hungarian chess Master and writer.

== Biography ==
Varnusz competed in five Hungarian Chess Championships: in 1958, 1961, 1963, 1965, and 1966. In 1966, he made his best career result with 10.5/18, for 6th place, as Gideon Barcza won. Varnusz shared 2nd-3rd places in the medium-strength Master event at Salgótarján 1978 with 10/13.

== Writings ==
Varnusz is best known as a chess writer, and has published 15 titles, in both German and English (translated). Here is a list of his book titles (http://www.chessworld.org, the Egon Varnusz entry).

- Die ausgewählten Partien von Lajos Portisch, by Egon Varnusz, Harri Deutsch 1990, ISBN 963-13-3707-3, in German.
- Wie spielt man Bogo-Indisch, by Egon Varnusz, Dreir Publishers 1989, in German.
- Play Anti-Indian Systems, by Egon Varnusz, Franckh-Kosmos 1990, ISBN 3-440-06156-6.
- Play the Caro-Kann, by Egon Varnusz, MacMillan 1991 (2nd edition), ISBN 1-85744-013-7.
- Semi-Slawisch 1 – Meraner Variante, by Egon Varnusz, Dreier Publishers 1992, in German.
- Semi-Slawisch 2 – Antimeraner, by Egon Varnusz, Dreier Publishers 1992, in German.
- Angenommenes Damengambit (Queen's Gambit Accepted), by Egon Varnusz, Düsseldorf 1994, Schachverlag Manfred Maguer, ISBN 3-925691-11-1, in German. English version (pub. Schmidt Schach) translated by Gábor Pirisi.
- Neuerungen in Slawisch, by Egon Varnusz, Dreier Publishers 1994, in German.
- Slawisch, by Egon Varnusz, Dreier Publishers 1994, in German.
- Paul Keres Best Games, Volume I: Closed Games, by Egon Varnusz, London 1994, Cadogan Chess, ISBN 1-85744-064-1.
- Paul Keres Best Games, Volume II: Semi-Open Games, by Egon Varnusz, London 1994, Cadogan Chess, ISBN 0-08-037139-6.
- Aljechin, der Größte, by Egon Varnusz and Arpad Walter Foldeak, Düsseldorf 1994, Schachverlag Manfred Maguer, ISBN 3-89597-254-1.
- Klassische Systeme : Spanisch ohne a6, by Egon Varnusz, 1995, Becker Publishers.
- Emanuel Lasker Games 1889–1907, by Egon Varnusz, 1998, Schmidt Schach Publishers.
- M.M. Botvinnik I, Games 1924-1940, by Egon Varnusz, 1999, Schmidt Schach Publishers.
