= Nikolay Novotelnov =

Russian chess player and author

Nikolay Novotelnov (Russian: Николай Новотельнов; 14 December 1911, Saint Petersburg – 30 December 2006, Saint Petersburg) was Russian chess International Master (1951) and author.

He was champion of Leningrad and won Russian Federated Republics championship in 1947. He was 6th at the Chigorin Memorial Tournament in 1947. In 1947, he was ranked 20th in the world.

== Notable games ==
- Ratmir Kholmov vs Nikolay Novotelnov, Chigorin mem 1947, Spanish Game: Open Variations, Classical Defense (C83), 0-1
- Nikolay Novotelnov vs Svetozar Gligoric, Chigorin mem 1947, Neo-Grünfeld Defence: Delayed Exchange Variation (D74), 1-0
- Nikolay Novotelnov vs Vasily Smyslov, Ch URS, Moscow 1951, Nimzo-Indian Defense: Gligoric System (E56), 1-0
