= Lev Aronin =

Soviet chess player and meteorologist (1920–1982)

Personal information
- Born: Lev Solomonovich Aronin; 20 July 1920 Kuibyshev, Russian SFSR, Soviet Union
- Died: 4 October 1982 (aged 62) Moscow, Soviet Union

Chess career
- Country: Soviet Union
- Title: International Master (1950)
- Peak rating: 2420 (July 1971)

Lev Solomonovich Aronin (Russian: Лев Соломонович Аронин; 20 July 1920, Kuibyshev – 4 October 1982, Moscow) was a Soviet International Master of chess. He was a meteorologist by profession.

== Early years ==
Lev Solomonovich Aronin played in eight USSR Chess Championships, which were the strongest tournaments in the world during his era, and placed as high as a tie for 2nd–4th places in 1950 at Moscow.

He was the youngest of three brothers, with Gregory (1913–2007) being the eldest, and Efim (1915–1989) being the second. Gregory taught him chess at the age of 8, and he could recall that at the age of 14, Lev beat him and Efim simultaneously without looking at the boards while they were making the moves over the chessboards for Lev and themselves. Gregory later told:

He was lying on the couch at another room and shouted the moves to us, for each board, and we were making them over the boards and shouting back our respective moves. It was amazing. Both games lasted for no longer than around 30 moves each, which is not trivial given both me and Efim were quite strong chess players.

=== Early competitive results ===
Aronin lost a match quite badly in 1944, to the strong, experienced Master Alexander Konstantinopolsky, by +1−6=5. In an All-USSR First Category tournament at Gorky, 1945, Aronin scored 5/15, for 14th place out of 16 players. However, he then achieved a very fine win in a tournament (likely a USSR Championship quarter-final) at Erevan 1945, scoring an unbeaten 12/15. He then scored 7½/15 in the Soviet Championship semifinal, Moscow 1945, tying for 8th–9th places. In a Candidate Masters' tournament at Kaunas, 1946, Aronin won clear first place with 11/14, losing only one game. This earned him the Soviet Master title, and marked a big improvement in his play in just two years.

== Soviet Master ==
In 1946 at Tbilisi, in the USSR Championship semifinal, Aronin made an excellent tie for second place, with 11/17. This earned him a place in his first Soviet final, held in Leningrad 1947 (15th URS-ch), and he performed creditably in super-strong company with 7/19, in a tie for 17th–18th places.

Aronin won the 1947 Championship of Moscow Region (Oblast) with an unbeaten score of 8½/10. He then tied for sixth place in the Moscow championship of 1947 with a score of 7½/14. He placed second in the Russian Championship at Kuibyshev with 7½/13, behind only Nikolay Novotelnov.

Then, at Leningrad 1947, the Soviet qualifying semifinal for the next final, he tied for first place with Mark Taimanov, scoring 10½/15, and qualified for his second Soviet final. The next year saw the Soviet Championship (16th URS-ch) held in Moscow, and Aronin scored 6/18, for 18th position.

Aronin again won the Championship of Moscow Region (Oblast) in 1948 with an unbeaten score of 11½/13. He played in the Russian Championship at Saratov 1948, tying for 5th–6th places, with a score of 8½/15.

He had to return to qualifying for the next national championship, but came through the gauntlet of the semifinal, with a fine 11/16 in Moscow 1949, tying for 2nd–3rd places, to advance. The final (17th URS-ch) was also held in Moscow, and this marked Aronin's arrival at the elite level, as he posted a strong 10/19, good for a tie for 9th–10th places, and a 2636 performance rating, according to chessmetrics.com. This was his first Grandmaster-level result (assuming a GM result as 2600+).

== Reaches the Soviet elite ==
Despite his solid finish in 1949, Aronin was not exempt into the next Soviet final. To qualify, he played the semifinal at Gorky 1950, which worked out much better than his 1945 visit there. He scored 10½/15, for clear first place. Aronin also played the Russian Championship at Gorky that same year; he tied for 2nd–4th places, with 7½/12, behind only Rashid Nezhmetdinov.

Moving on to Moscow 1950 (18th URS-ch), this tournament marked the high point of his career, as he scored 11/17 for a tie of 2nd–4th places, behind only Paul Keres. He was exempt from qualifying the next year. Although not quite as strong the next year, Aronin scored 9/17 at Moscow 1951 (19th URS-ch) and a tie for 9th–10th places.

Aronin had to go back to the semifinal stage to qualify for the next final, however, and he qualified successfully at Sochi 1951. The 20th URS-ch was held at Moscow 1952, and Aronin dropped a bit from previous championships, managing only 9/19, for 12th place.

Aronin was awarded the International Master title in 1950 by FIDE, the World Chess Federation.

== International chance denied ==
Very little about Aronin's chess can be found in English-language sources. However, GM David Bronstein, in his acclaimed 1995 book The Sorcerer's Apprentice (coauthored with Tom Furstenberg) is one writer who has something to say. Bronstein wrote that he had played several games with Aronin, and knew him quite well. Bronstein's first encounter with Aronin,

which ended in a draw, dates back to the Semi-Final of the USSR Championship in 1945. Lev Solomonovich Aronin played successfully many times in USSR Championships but never managed to actually become the champion. He never received the title of grandmaster which he deserved without any doubt. Also, his name was removed from the list of participants of the Interzonal Tournament 1952 in Stockholm in favour of another player, a high-ranking member of the USSR Chess Federation (Alexander Kotov, T.F.). It turned out that this player was to be the winner of the tournament with a record score. In the 22nd USSR Championship played in 1955 Aronin had a totally winning position in the last round against Vasily Smyslov and therefore did not seriously analyse the adjourned position. He missed a hidden, very neat, drawing variation found by Smyslov, who had done his homework brilliantly, and had to settle for a draw, missing qualification by half a point for the Interzonal Tournament in 1952. Aronin's style of play reminds me of Mikhail Botvinnik and Semyon Furman, very positional and safe but occasionally also using his combinative talent.

— David Bronstein, The Sorcerer's Apprentice

In fact, Aronin did not play in the 1955 Soviet Championship final, referred to by Bronstein, with the game against Smyslov. Likely Bronstein means the 1951 Championship, in which Smyslov and Aronin both played. And for the 1952 qualification situation with Kotov, referred to by Bronstein, Aronin had finished with 9/17 in the 1951 Championship, the Soviet qualifying event for the 1952 Interzonal, while Kotov had 8/17 in that event. Several players who had finished ahead of Aronin in that 1951 event were otherwise exempt past the 1952 Interzonal stage: Botvinnik as World Champion, and Paul Keres, Smyslov, and Bronstein, based on their earlier strong performances from previous World Championship cycles. Taimanov, Efim Geller, Yuri Averbakh, and Tigran Petrosian all finished ahead of Aronin in the 1951 Soviet final, and those four played in the 1952 Interzonal, along with Kotov; all five Soviets also played well enough to move on from Stockholm to the 1953 Candidates' Tournament at Zurich.

== Later tournament results ==
Aronin's next strong performance took place in the Soviet Team Championship, Riga 1954. There, he scored 6½/10. Then, at Leningrad 1956, he was again in form, with 11½/19, tying for first with Abraham Khasin, Alexander Tolush, Konstantin Klaman, and Boris Spassky.

He went back to the semifinal stage for the 1957 Soviet final, and he qualified through with a fine 14/19 at the semifinal in Tbilisi 1957, second place behind Taimanov, and advanced to the final. Then, at the 1957 Soviet Championship in Moscow (24th URS-ch), Aronin scored 11/21 to tie for 10th–11th places. In an International tournament in Leningrad later in 1957, Aronin scored 12/19, good for a tie for third–fourth places, behind Spassky and Alexander Tolush, and tied with Taimanov.

Aronin was selected for the Soviet team for the first European Team Championship, Vienna 1957, and scored 1½/3 on the second reserve board. The Soviets won team gold, and in an utterly dominant performance, captured individual gold medals on each of the top nine boards.

In the Alekhine Memorial, Moscow 1959, Aronin had a minus score of 5/11, and tied for 7th–9th places. In the Moscow Championship of 1961, he tied for 3rd–5th places with 11/17. He played in an International tournament at Moscow 1961, and finished fourth, with 6½/11. He trailed only winners Evgeni Vasiukov and Vasily Smyslov, and third-placed Friðrik Ólafsson, while finishing ahead of several Grandmasters.

For the next Soviet final, he had to qualify, and did so at Riga 1962. Then, in the 1962 Soviet Championship at Erevan (30th URS-ch), Aronin scored 10½/19. He had a poor tournament at the Moscow 1962 International, scoring just 5/15. He won the Moscow Championship in 1965. Unfortunately, his chess playing career was eventually cut short due to ongoing health problems.

== Legacy and style ==
Aronin never got the chance to compete internationally, outside the Soviet Union, in an individual tournament. It is entirely possible that his career as a meteorologist worked against him in this respect; defections of several very strong Soviet players, including as Alexander Alekhine, Efim Bogoljubow, and Fedor Bohatirchuk to the West following the Soviet takeover in 1917 may have made the Soviet chess organization wary of allowing Aronin to travel outside the USSR with his important (and possibly secret) scientific knowledge. His only international chances came in a team event in 1957, and in a team match against Bulgaria that same year, where he played two games. In every Soviet tournament he played, he had to face a number of very strong compatriots. Stuck behind the incredibly deep Soviet vanguard, which in 1957 had 15 of the world's top 20 players, Aronin's chances to go abroad never came, since he was 37 by this time, and international opportunities were reserved for proven winners and younger players.

Aronin's style tended to be positional in nature, with the tactics arising naturally out of the position rather than being forced, and he was one of the leading lights with the King's Indian Defence from the mid-1940s, as this defence became very popular. He was a fine theoretician who was dangerous for virtually everyone he met; during his career he scored wins over almost all the top Soviet players, excepting Mikhail Botvinnik and Vasily Smyslov.

One of the mainline variations in the Orthodox King's Indian Defence is named the Aronin–Taimanov Variation, in honour of him and of GM Mark Taimanov. The variation runs 1.d4 Nf6 2.c4 g6 3.Nc3 Bg7 4.e4 d6 5.Nf3 0-0 6.Be2 e5 7.0-0 Nc6 8.d5 Ne7 9.Ne1.

Aronin died at the age of 62 in Moscow on October 4, 1982.

== Notable chess games ==
- Boris Verlinsky vs Lev Aronin, USSR Championship semifinal, Moscow 1945, Reti Opening / Nimzo-Larsen Attack (A06), 0–1 Aronin knocks off the veteran Verlinsky, 1929 Soviet Champion.
- Lev Aronin vs David Bronstein, Moscow Championship 1947, Sicilian Defence, Najdorf Variation (B92), 1–0 Bronstein was on his way up to challenge for the world title.
- Salo Flohr vs Lev Aronin, USSR Championship, Leningrad 1947, King's Indian Defence, Classical Variation (E94), 0–1 Aronin was one of the leading practitioners of the King's Indian Defence, during its development in the 1940s.
- Mark Taimanov vs Lev Aronin, USSR Championship, Moscow 1948, Sicilian Defence (B56), 0–1 Aronin was getting dangerous with the Black pieces against top players, and this was one of the keys to his rise.
- Grigory Levenfish vs Lev Aronin, USSR Championship, Moscow 1948, Neo-Grunfeld Defence (D77), 0–1 Devastating tactical victory over a former Soviet Champion.
- Salo Flohr vs Lev Aronin, USSR Championship, Moscow 1948, King's Indian Defence, Classical Variation (E92), 0–1 Another triumph for Black in the King's Indian.
- Vladas Mikenas vs Lev Aronin, USSR Championship, Moscow 1949, King's Indian Defence, Classical Variation (E90), 0–1 Mikenas was a perennial Lithuanian Champion who was also of near GM strength.
- Lev Aronin vs Alexander Kotov, USSR Championship, Moscow 1949, Sicilian Defence, Scheveningen Variation (B85), 1–0 Kotov had been joint Soviet Champion the year before.
- Tigran V. Petrosian vs Lev Aronin, USSR Championship, Moscow 1950, Queen's Gambit, Semi-Slav Defence (D43), 0–1 Aronin shows he can also play excellent chess in the classical style.
- Alexander Konstantinopolsky vs Lev Aronin, USSR Championship, Moscow 1950, Sicilian Defence, Richter–Rauzer Variation (B66), 0–1.

Konstantinopolsky had been Bronstein's youth coach, and was a near-GM strength player himself.

- Lev Aronin vs David Bronstein, USSR Championship, Moscow 1951, Sicilian Defence, Accelerated Dragon Variation / Maroczy Bind (B38), 1–0 Bronstein had drawn a match for the World Championship earlier in the year.
- Lev Aronin vs Tigran V. Petrosian, USSR Championship, Moscow 1951, Ruy Lopez, Closed Variation (C91), 1–0 Petrosian was gradually working his way towards the World Championship, which he would win in 1963.
- Lev Aronin vs Alexander Tolush, USSR Championship, Moscow 1952, Ruy Lopez, Closed Variation, Chigorin Defence (C99), 1–0 Aronin was a good theoretician, and he notches a win in one of the most heavily analysed variations.
- Lev Aronin vs Isaac Boleslavsky, USSR Championship, Moscow 1952, Sicilian Defence, Dragon Variation, Yugoslav Attack (B76), 1–0 Boleslavsky had been the joint winner of the Candidates' tournament two years earlier.
- Mikhail Tal vs Lev Aronin, USSR Team Championship, Riga 1954, Caro–Kann Defence, Two Knights' Variation (B10), 0–1 This event was one of Aronin's peak performances, and he takes care of the 17-year-old Tal in fine style.
- Lev Aronin vs Ratimir Kholmov, USSR Championship, Moscow 1957, Ruy Lopez, Closed Variation (C92), 1–0 Kholmov was on his way towards becoming virtually unbeatable during this era.
- Lev Aronin vs Viktor Korchnoi, USSR Championship, Moscow 1957, Grunfeld Defence (D91), 1–0 Korchnoi was a rising star, but he had to fight his way through a cadre of veteran masters like Aronin.
- Lev Aronin vs Nikolay Minev, USSR vs Bulgaria team match, Sofia 1957, Ruy Lopez, Closed Variation (C92), 1–0 Aronin scores on his first trip outside the USSR.
- Lev Aronin vs Vladimir Simagin, Moscow Championship 1961, Caro–Kann Defence, Advance Variation (B12), 1–0 Simagin was a crafty veteran GM with a creative bent in the openings.
- Mikhail Tal vs Lev Aronin, USSR Championship, Erevan 1962, Sicilian Defence, Accelerated Dragon Variation (B37), 0–1 Aronin defeats a former World Champion who was one of the most dangerous attacking players of all time.
- Lev Aronin vs Aron Reshko, USSR Team Championship, Moscow 1966, Scandinavian Defence (B01), 1–0 One of Aronin's last notable wins.

== See also ==
- List of Jewish chess players
