= Alexander Tolush =

Soviet chess grandmaster (1910–1969)

Personal information
- Born: 1 May 1910 Saint Petersburg, Russia
- Died: 3 March 1969 (aged 58) Leningrad, Soviet Union

Chess career
- Country: Soviet Union
- Title: Grandmaster (1953); International Correspondence Chess Master (1965)

Alexander Kazimirovich Tolush (Russian: Александр Казимирович Толуш; 1 May 1910 – 3 March 1969) was a Soviet chess grandmaster. He was one of Boris Spassky's mentors. Tolush was born and died in Saint Petersburg (named Leningrad in 1969). He earned the title of International Master (IM) in 1950, Grandmaster (GM) in 1953, and International Master of Correspondence Chess (IMC) in 1965.

== Tournament career ==
Tolush won the Leningrad Championship in 1937 (joint), 1938, 1946, and 1947 (joint). He played in the USSR Championship ten times. His best result was second place (+8−3=6 shared with Aronin and Lipnitsky) behind Keres in 1950. He finished fourth in 1952 (+8−4=7, equal with Boleslavsky and behind Botvinnik, Taimanov, and Geller) and fourth 1957 (+10−5=6 equal with Spassky and behind Tal, Bronstein, and Keres). Going into the last round, he was 1st equal with Tal with Tal winning their last round individual encounter and secured gold.

His best international result was first place (+10−1=8) at Bucharest 1953, ahead of Petrosian, Smyslov, Boleslavsky, and Spassky. In 1968 he was second at Keszthely +7−1=3 behind Portisch. Tolush never played in the Olympiads, but represented the USSR in two European Team Chess Championships.

== Legacy ==
Although he never reached the very highest level of chess, Tolush was an imaginative attacking player. He worked as a chess journalist, and was a noted trainer whose pupils included Keres and Spassky. His biography Alexander Tolush (1983) was compiled by his wife Valentina and includes 92 games.

Tolush introduced the Tolush–Geller Gambit of the Slav Defense to master play in the games Tolush–Smyslov USSR Championship 1947, and Tolush–Levenfish Leningrad Championship 1947.
