= USSR Chess Federation =

Group of players of the board game in the Eurasian country

The USSR Chess Federation (Russian: Шахматная федерация СССР, Shakhmatnaya fyedyeratsiya SSSR) was the national organization for chess in the USSR. It was founded in 1924 and its headquarters were in Moscow. It was affiliated with the World Chess Federation. The USSR Chess Federation organized the USSR Chess Championship and published a newspaper called Шахматы в СССР (Chess in the USSR).

== Administration ==
=== Board ===
The board consisted of a chairman, a deputy chairman, a secretary, and a treasurer.

=== Chairmen ===
- Nikolai Krylenko (1924–1938)
- Mikhail Botvinnik (1938–1939)
- Vladimir Herman (1939–1941 and 1945–1947)
- Boris Weinstein (1942–1945)
- Vladislav Vinogradov (1947–1949, 1952–1954 and 1961–1962)
- M. Kharlamov (1949–1952)
- Vladimir Alatortsev (1954–1961)
- Boris Rodionov (1962–1968)
- Alexey Serov (1968–1969)
- Dmitry Postnikov (1969–1972)
- Yuri Averbakh (1972–1977)
- Vitaly Sevastyanov (1977–1986 and 1988–1989)
- Aleksandre Chikvaidze (1986–1988)
- Vladimir Popov (1989–1991)

== Soviet chess players ==
- Mikhail Botvinnik (1911–1995), chairman of the USSR Chess Federation (1938–1938) and world champion and USSR champion
- Garry Kasparov, world champion
- Anatoly Karpov, world champion
- Mikhail Tal, USSR champion and world champion
- Tigran Petrosian, world champion

== See also ==
- Chess Federation of Russia – The Federation's successor
