= 1940 USSR Chess Championship =

Soviet chess tournament

12th Soviet Chess Championship (1940)
- Location: Moscow

Champion
- Andor Lilienthal; Igor Bondarevsky

The 1940 Soviet Chess Championship was the 12th edition of USSR Chess Championship. Held from 5 September to 3 October 1940 in Moscow. The tournament was won by Andor Lilienthal and Igor Bondarevsky. Twenty of the Soviet Union's strongest masters competed in the final, six of whom qualified in the semifinals in Kiev earlier that year: Eduard Gerstenfeld, Mark Stolberg, Igor Bondarevsky, Iosif Rudakovsky, Alexander Konstantinopolsky and Peter Dubinin. The remaining invitations went to the Soviet chess elite. Botvinnik did his worst championship, only drawing in 5th/6th position, losing matches to both winners. This championship marked the debut of Paul Keres (4th) and the future world champion Vassily Smyslov (3rd). USSR had expanded its territory in 1939-40, incorporating the Baltic states, which meant that the strong masters Paul Keres from Estonia and Vladimir Petrov from Latvia were able to participate. In 1941, the top six played a competition called Absolute Championship of Soviet Union, ending with Botvinnik's victory.

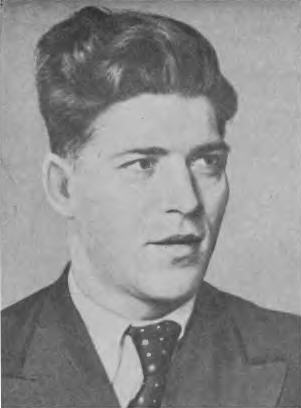
Andor Lilienthal in 1940

== Tables and results ==
=== Semifinal ===
Semifinal, Kiev, May 1940
	Player	1	2	3	4	5	6	7	8	9	10	11	12	13	14	15	16	17	Total
1	(Soviet Union) Eduard Gerstenfeld	-	½	0	1	½	1	1	1	½	½	1	½	½	½	1	½	½	10½
2	(Soviet Union) Mark Stolberg	½	-	1	0	½	1	1	0	1	½	1	1	1	0	1	0	1	10½
3	(Soviet Union) Igor Bondarevsky	1	0	-	1	1	½	½	½	½	½	1	0	0	1	½	1	1	10
4	(Soviet Union) Iosif Rudakovsky	0	1	0	-	1	½	1	½	1	½	½	½	1	½	½	½	½	9½
5	(Soviet Union) Alexander Konstantinopolsky	½	½	0	0	-	1	½	1	½	1	½	½	½	1	½	½	1	9½
6	(Soviet Union) Peter Dubinin	0	0	½	½	0	-	½	0	1	1	1	1	½	1	1	1	½	9½
7	(Soviet Union) Vladimir Alatortsev	0	0	½	0	½	½	-	½	0	1	1	1	1	½	1	1	1	9½
8	(Soviet Union) Genrikh Kasparian	0	1	½	½	0	1	½	-	0	½	1	½	½	1	½	½	1	9
9	(Soviet Union) Samuel Zhukhovitsky	½	0	½	0	½	0	1	1	-	0	0	0	1	1	1	1	1	8½
10	(Soviet Union) Lev Kaiev	½	½	½	½	0	0	0	½	1	-	0	1	½	½	½	1	1	8
11	(Soviet Union) Abram Khavin	0	0	0	½	½	0	0	0	1	1	-	1	½	1	0	½	1	7
12	(Soviet Union) Grigory Goldberg	½	0	1	½	½	0	0	½	1	0	0	-	1	½	½	½	0	6½
13	(Soviet Union) Vitaly Chekhover	½	0	1	0	½	½	0	½	0	½	½	0	-	½	½	½	½	6
14	(Soviet Union) Vsevolod Rauzer	½	1	0	½	0	0	½	0	0	½	0	½	½	-	½	1	½	6
15	(Soviet Union) Dmitry Grechkin	0	0	½	½	½	0	0	½	0	½	1	½	½	½	-	0	1	6
16	(Soviet Union) D. S. Fridman	½	1	0	½	½	0	0	½	0	0	½	½	½	0	1	-	0	5½
17	(Soviet Union) Iosif Pogrebissky	½	0	0	½	0	½	0	0	0	0	0	1	½	½	0	1	-	4½

=== Final ===
12th Soviet Chess Championship Final
		1	2	3	4	5	6	7	8	9	10	11	12	13	14	15	16	17	18	19	20	Total
1	(Soviet Union) Andor Lilienthal	-	1	½	½	½	1	1	1	1	½	½	½	½	½	1	½	½	½	1	1	13½
2	(Soviet Union) Igor Bondarevsky	0	-	½	1	½	1	½	1	1	½	0	1	1	½	½	1	1	½	1	1	13½
3	(Soviet Union) Vassily Smyslov	½	½	-	½	½	½	0	½	1	1	1	½	½	½	1	1	1	½	1	1	13
4	(Soviet Union) Paul Keres	½	0	½	-	½	½	0	1	0	1	1	1	½	1	½	1	1	1	1	0	12
5	(Soviet Union) Isaac Boleslavsky	½	½	½	½	-	0	1	0	½	1	1	½	½	½	1	1	0	1	1	½	11½
6	(Soviet Union) Mikhail Botvinnik	0	0	½	½	1	-	0	½	1	1	½	½	0	1	1	1	½	1	½	1	11½
7	(Soviet Union) Vladimir Makogonov	0	½	1	1	0	1	-	0	1	0	1	½	½	½	½	½	1	½	½	½	10½
8	(Soviet Union) Peter Dubinin	0	0	½	0	1	½	1	-	0	1	1	1	½	½	½	½	1	0	1	½	10½
9	(Soviet Union) Gavriil Veresov	0	0	0	1	½	0	0	1	-	1	½	½	1	½	0	1	½	1	1	1	10½
10	(Soviet Union) Vladimir Petrov	½	½	0	0	0	0	1	0	0	-	½	1	½	0	½	1	1	1	1	½	9
11	(Soviet Union) Viacheslav Ragozin	½	1	0	0	0	½	0	0	½	½	-	1	½	1	0	0	½	½	1	1	8½
12	(Soviet Union) Georgy Lisitsin	½	0	½	0	½	½	½	0	½	0	0	-	1	1	0	1	1	½	0	1	8½
13	(Soviet Union) Vladas Mikenas	½	0	½	½	½	1	½	½	0	½	½	0	-	½	1	0	0	1	0	½	8
14	(Soviet Union) Alexander Konstantinopolsky	½	½	½	0	½	0	½	½	½	1	0	0	½	-	1	0	½	½	0	1	8
15	(Soviet Union) Vasily Panov	0	½	0	½	0	0	½	½	1	½	1	1	0	0	-	½	0	½	1	½	8
16	(Soviet Union) Mark Stolberg	½	0	0	0	0	0	½	½	0	0	1	0	1	1	½	-	1	½	1	½	8
17	(Soviet Union) Eduard Gerstenfeld	½	0	0	0	1	½	0	0	½	0	½	0	1	½	1	0	-	½	0	1	7
18	(Soviet Union) Grigory Levenfish	½	½	½	0	0	0	½	1	0	0	½	½	0	½	½	½	½	-	0	½	6½
19	(Soviet Union) Alexander Kotov	0	0	0	0	0	½	½	0	0	0	0	1	1	1	0	0	1	1	-	½	6½
20	(Soviet Union) Iosif Rudakovsky	0	0	0	1	½	0	½	½	0	½	0	0	½	0	½	½	0	½	½	-	5½

== 1941 Absolute Champion of the USSR ==
The winner of the 1940 Soviet championship should face world champion Alexander Alekhine for the world title. Nor did the result settle the question of which Soviet player should challenge Alekhine. A new sports official worked diligently behind the scenes to undermine the original decision to have a match for the title between Bondarevsky and Lilienthal. As a result, it was announced a new title Absolute Champion of the USSR was being set up and would be contested in Leningrad and Moscow as a match-tournament of the top six. In fact, the Absolute Championship was to be a one-off, never to be played again. Only two months after Botvinnik's success, his dreams of challenging Alekhine were shattered when Hitler invaded the Soviet Union.

1941 Absolute Champion of the USSR
		1	2	3	4	5	6	Total
1	(Soviet Union) Mikhail Botvinnik	----	1½½½	1½1½	1½1½	1½01	01½1	13½
2	(Soviet Union) Paul Keres	0½½½	----	110½	½0½½	01½1	1½1½	11
3	(Soviet Union) Vassily Smyslov	0½0½	001½	----	½1½1	½1½½	½½½½	10
4	(Soviet Union) Isaac Boleslavsky	0½0½	½1½½	½0½0	----	11½1	½00½	9
5	(Soviet Union) Andor Lilienthal	0½10	10½0	½0½½	00½0	----	1½11	8½
6	(Soviet Union) Igor Bondarevsky	10½0	0½0½	½½½½	½11½	0½00	----	8
