= 1945 USSR Chess Championship =

Soviet chess tournament

14th Soviet Chess Championship (1945)
- Location: Moscow

Champion
- Mikhail Botvinnik

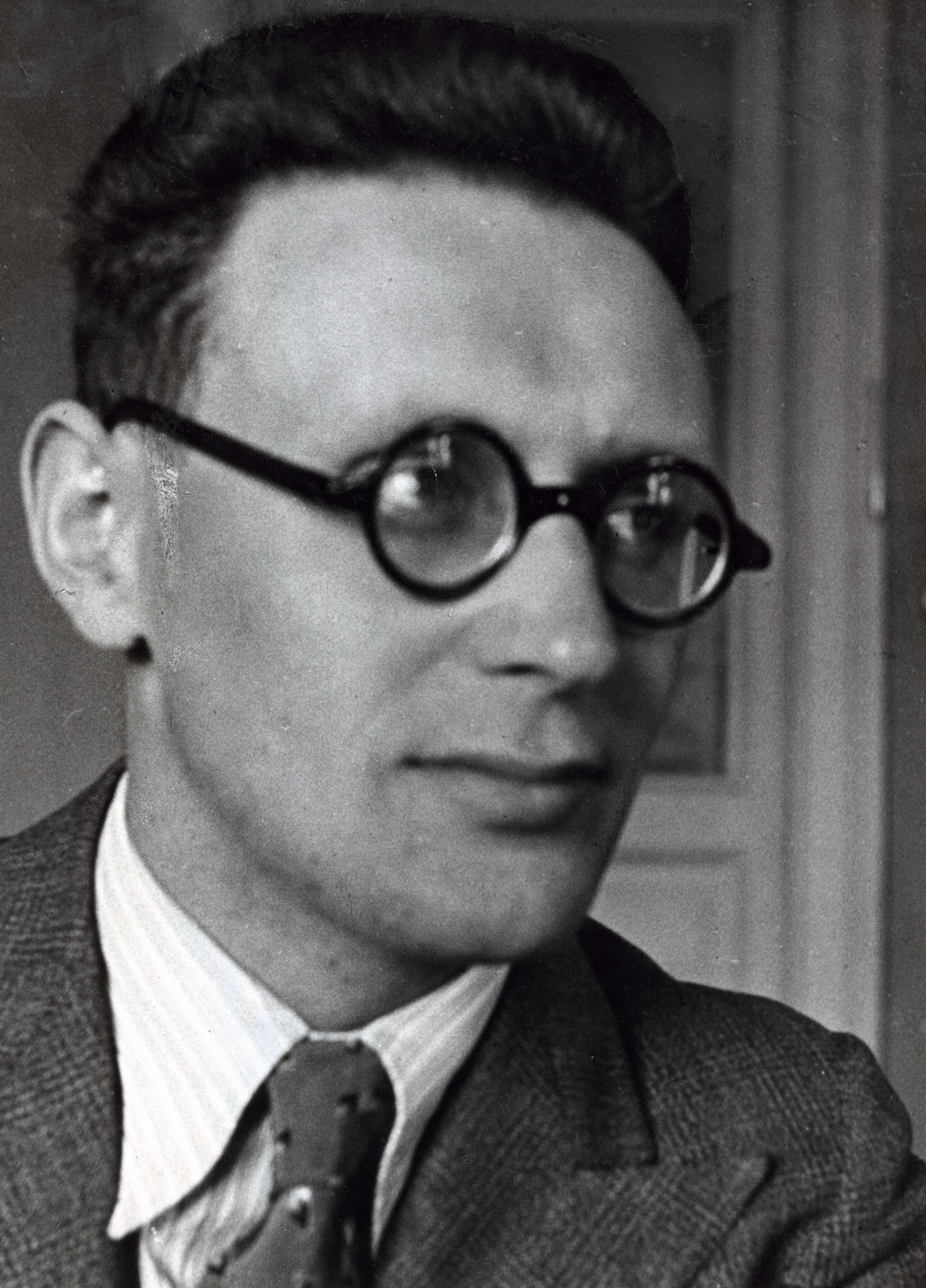
Michaël Botwinnik

The 1945 Soviet Chess Championship was the 14th edition of USSR Chess Championship. Held from 1 June to 3 July 1945 in Moscow. The tournament was won by Mikhail Botvinnik.

== Tables and results ==
14th Soviet Chess Championship (1945)
	Player	1	2	3	4	5	6	7	8	9	10	11	12	13	14	15	16	17	18	Total
1	(Soviet Union) Mikhail Botvinnik	-	1	½	½	1	1	1	½	1	1	1	½	1	1	1	1	1	1	15
2	(Soviet Union) Isaac Boleslavsky	0	-	½	1	1	½	½	0	1	1	1	½	1	½	1	½	1	1	12
3	(Soviet Union) David Bronstein	½	½	-	0	0	½	½	0	1	½	½	1	0	1	1	1	1	1	10
4	(Soviet Union) Alexander Kotov	½	0	1	-	1	½	0	1	0	½	1	½	0	½	1	½	½	1	9½
5	(Soviet Union) Igor Bondarevsky	0	0	1	0	-	½	½	1	½	½	½	½	1	½	1	½	1	½	9½
6	(Soviet Union) Alexander Konstantinopolsky	0	½	½	½	½	-	0	½	0	½	1	1	1	½	½	1	½	1	9½
7	(Soviet Union) Andor Lilienthal	0	½	½	1	½	1	-	1	0	0	½	0	1	1	½	1	0	½	9
8	(Soviet Union) Viacheslav Ragozin	½	1	1	0	0	½	0	-	0	½	1	1	0	0	1	½	1	1	9
9	(Soviet Union) Iosif Rudakovsky	0	0	0	1	½	1	1	1	-	½	0	½	1	0	½	0	1	1	9
10	(Soviet Union) Vitaly Chekhover	0	0	½	½	½	½	1	½	½	-	1	½	0	½	1	½	1	0	8½
11	(Soviet Union) Vassily Smyslov	0	0	½	0	½	0	½	0	1	0	-	½	1	½	1	1	1	1	8½
12	(Soviet Union) Vladimir Alatortsev	½	½	0	½	½	0	1	0	½	½	½	-	1	0	0	1	½	½	7½
13	(Soviet Union) Alexander Tolush	0	0	1	1	0	0	0	1	0	1	0	0	-	1	½	1	0	1	7½
14	(Soviet Union) Alexander Koblencs	0	½	0	½	½	½	0	1	1	½	½	1	0	-	0	½	½	0	7
15	(Soviet Union) Peter Romanovsky	0	0	0	0	0	½	½	0	½	0	0	1	½	1	-	1	1	½	6½
16	(Soviet Union) Boris Ratner	0	½	0	½	½	0	0	½	1	½	0	0	0	½	0	-	1	1	6
17	(Soviet Union) Ilya Kan	0	0	0	½	0	½	1	0	0	0	0	½	1	½	0	0	-	1	5
18	(Soviet Union) Grigory Goldberg	0	0	0	0	½	0	½	0	0	1	0	½	0	1	½	0	0	-	4
