= 1952 USSR Chess Championship =

Chess competition

20th Soviet Chess Championship (1952)
- Location: Moscow

Champion
- Mikhail Botvinnik

The 1952 Soviet Chess Championship was the 20th edition of the USSR Chess Championship. Held from 29 November to 29 December 1952 in Moscow. The tournament was won by Mikhail Botvinnik. Botvinnik and Mark Taimanov had a play-off match of six games in February 1953, which ended with the victory of Botvinnik 3½-2½, so bringing him his seventh title. The final were preceded by quarter-finals events and four semifinals (at Leningrad, Minsk, Riga and Sochi). For the first time in such events players were forbidden to agree a draw in under 30 moves unless they could get the arbiter's consent.

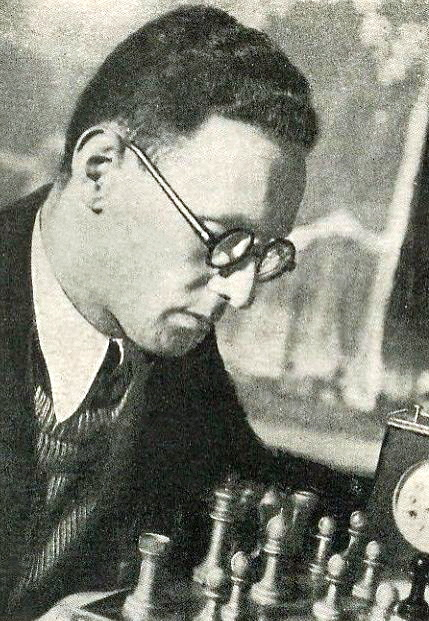
Mikhail Botvinnik

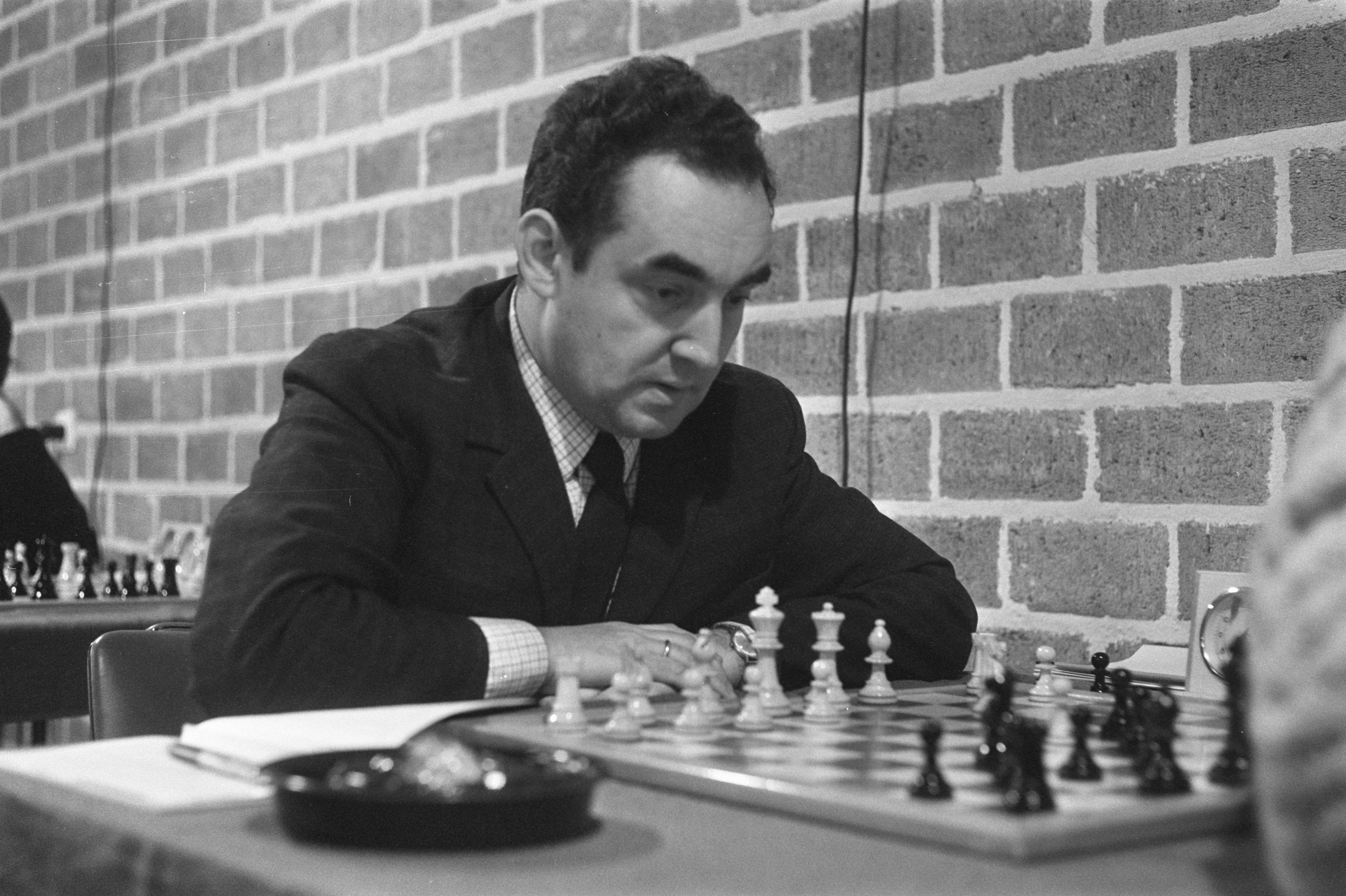
Mark Taimanov, the runner up

== Table and results ==
20th Soviet Chess Championship (1952)
	Player	1	2	3	4	5	6	7	8	9	10	11	12	13	14	15	16	17	18	19	20	Total
1	(Soviet Union) Mikhail Botvinnik	-	0	1	½	½	½	1	½	1	1	1	½	½	½	1	1	½	1	½	1	13½
2	(Soviet Union) Mark Taimanov	1	-	0	½	0	1	1	½	½	0	½	1	1	1	1	1	1	½	1	1	13½
3	(Soviet Union) Efim Geller	0	1	-	1	1	½	½	0	0	½	1	½	1	1	1	½	½	1	½	½	12
4	(Soviet Union) Alexander Tolush	½	½	0	-	1	½	0	1	1	½	½	0	1	0	½	1	1	½	1	1	11½
5	(Soviet Union) Isaac Boleslavsky	½	1	0	0	-	½	½	1	½	1	½	0	0	1	½	½	1	1	1	1	11½
6	(Soviet Union) Viktor Korchnoi	½	0	½	½	½	-	0	1	½	0	0	1	1	½	1	0	1	1	1	1	11
7	(Soviet Union) David Bronstein	0	0	½	1	½	1	-	½	1	½	½	1	1	½	½	½	½	½	0	½	10½
8	(Soviet Union) Vassily Smyslov	½	½	1	0	0	0	½	-	½	1	1	½	0	1	1	½	½	½	½	1	10½
9	(Soviet Union) Oleg Moiseev	0	½	1	0	½	½	0	½	-	0	½	½	1	1	½	1	1	½	1	½	10½
10	(Soviet Union) Alexey Suetin	0	1	½	½	0	1	½	0	1	-	0	½	1	½	½	0	0	1	1	½	9½
11	(Soviet Union) Paul Keres	0	½	0	½	½	1	½	0	½	1	-	½	0	½	½	1	0	1	½	1	9½
12	(Soviet Union) Lev Aronin	½	0	½	1	1	0	0	½	½	½	½	-	½	½	0	1	½	½	½	½	9
13	(Soviet Union) Vasily Byvshev	½	0	0	0	1	0	0	1	0	0	1	½	-	0	1	0	1	1	1	1	9
14	(Soviet Union) Vladimir Simagin	½	0	0	1	0	½	½	0	0	½	½	½	1	-	0	1	½	½	½	1	8½
15	(Soviet Union) Georgy Ilivitsky	0	0	0	½	½	0	½	0	½	½	½	1	0	1	-	1	½	½	1	½	8½
16	(Soviet Union) Alexander Konstantinopolsky	0	0	½	0	½	1	½	½	0	1	0	0	1	0	0	-	1	½	½	½	7½
17	(Soviet Union) Isaac Lipnitsky	½	0	½	0	0	0	½	½	0	1	1	½	0	½	½	0	-	1	½	0	7
18	(Soviet Union) Ilya Kan	0	½	0	½	0	0	½	½	½	0	0	½	0	½	½	½	0	-	1	1	6½
19	(Soviet Union) Genrikh Kasparian	½	0	½	0	0	0	1	½	0	0	½	½	0	½	0	½	½	0	-	½	5½
20	(Soviet Union) Boris Goldenov	0	0	½	0	0	0	½	0	½	½	0	½	0	0	½	½	1	0	½	-	5

=== Play-off match ===
20th Soviet Chess Championship, Play-off match, Moscow, February 1953
Player	1	2	3	4	5	6	Total
(Soviet Union) Mikhail Botvinnik	1	½	½	1	0	½	3½
(Soviet Union) Mark Taimanov	0	½	½	0	1	½	2½
