= Iosif Rudakovsky =

Ukrainian chess player

Iosif Iosifovich Rudakovsky (Ukrainian: Іосиф Рудаковський, romanized: Iosyf Rudakovskyi, January 1914, Voronezh – December 1947, Chernivtsi) was a Ukrainian chess master.

He took 8th at Moscow 1936, won at Rostov-on-Don 1939, shared 3rd at Kiev 1940 (the 12th Ukrainian Chess Championship, Isaac Boleslavsky won), tied for 4-7th at Kiev 1940 (USSR-ch semifinal), took 20th at Moscow 1940 (the 12th USSR Chess Championship, Andor Lilienthal and Igor Bondarevsky won), and played in interrupted USSR-ch semifinals in Rostov-on-Don in June 1941 (the German-Soviet War, 22 June 1941 – 9 May 1945). After the war, he tied for 7-9th at Moscow (the 14th USSR-ch, Mikhail Botvinnik won), and shared 1st with Alexander Kotov and Alexander Konstantinopolsky at Baku 1945 (USSR-ch sf).

He was a reservist in the Soviet team during the USSR vs. US radio match in 1–4 September 1945.
