= 1954 USSR Chess Championship =

Soviet chess tournament

21st Soviet Chess Championship (1954)
- Location: Kiev

Champion
- Yuri Averbakh

The 1954 Soviet Chess Championship was the 21st edition of USSR Chess Championship. Held from 7 January to 7 February 1954 in Kiev. The tournament was won by Yuri Averbakh. The final were preceded semifinals events at Moscow, Leningrad, Rostov and Vilnius.

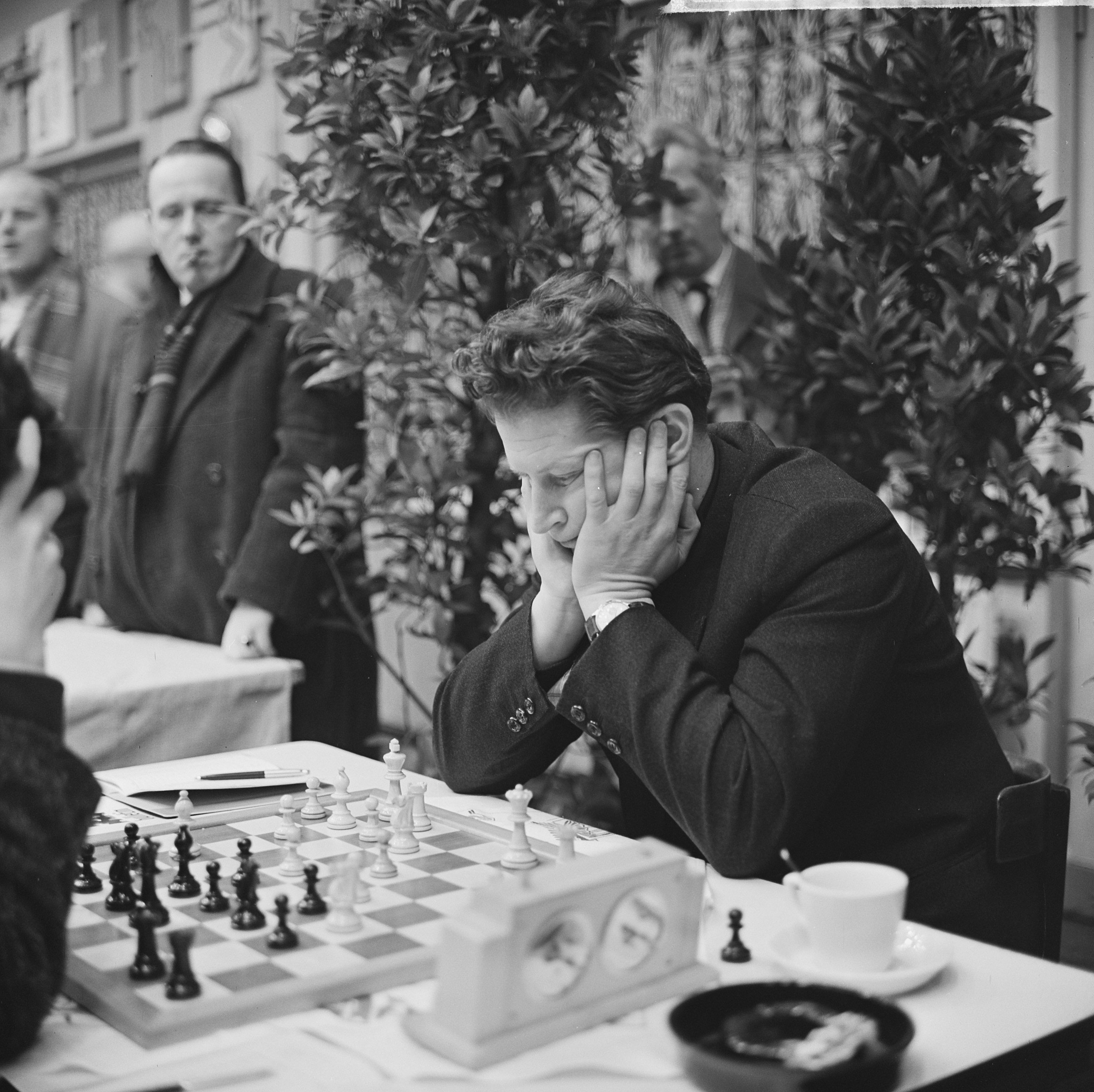
Yuri Averbakh playing a chess game

== Table and results ==
21st Soviet Chess Championship (1954)
	Player	1	2	3	4	5	6	7	8	9	10	11	12	13	14	15	16	17	18	19	20	Total
1	(Soviet Union) Yuri Averbakh	-	½	½	½	½	½	1	1	½	1	1	½	½	1	1	1	½	1	1	1	14½
2	(Soviet Union) Mark Taimanov	½	-	½	½	½	½	1	½	½	1	1	½	½	1	½	½	½	1	1	1	13
3	(Soviet Union) Viktor Korchnoi	½	½	-	0	½	½	0	½	1	1	1	1	1	0	1	1	1	½	1	1	13
4	(Soviet Union) Georgy Lisitsin	½	½	1	-	½	1	1	½	1	0	½	½	0	½	½	1	1	1	½	1	12½
5	(Soviet Union) Tigran Petrosian	½	½	½	½	-	½	½	½	1	½	1	½	1	1	½	1	½	½	½	1	12½
6	(Soviet Union) Ratmir Kholmov	½	½	½	0	½	-	½	0	1	1	1	½	1	½	½	½	½	0	1	½	10½
7	(Soviet Union) Alexey Suetin	0	0	1	0	½	½	-	1	½	1	½	½	1	½	1	0	1	½	0	½	10
8	(Soviet Union) Semyon Furman	0	½	½	½	½	1	0	-	1	0	0	½	½	½	½	0	1	1	1	1	10
9	(Soviet Union) Rashid Nezhmetdinov	½	½	0	0	0	0	½	0	-	½	1	1	1	0	1	1	1	½	1	½	10
10	(Soviet Union) Vasily Byvshev	0	0	0	1	½	0	0	1	½	-	0	1	½	½	0	1	½	1	1	1	9½
11	(Soviet Union) Efim Geller	0	0	0	½	0	0	½	1	0	1	-	1	0	1	1	1	0	1	1	½	9½
12	(Soviet Union) Salo Flohr	½	½	0	½	½	½	½	½	0	0	0	-	½	1	½	½	½	½	1	½	8½
13	(Soviet Union) Georgy Borisenko	½	½	0	1	0	0	0	½	0	½	1	½	-	½	½	½	1	½	0	1	8½
14	(Soviet Union) Anatoly Bannik	0	0	1	½	0	½	½	½	1	½	0	0	½	-	1	½	0	0	½	1	8
15	(Soviet Union) Georgy Ilivitsky	0	½	0	½	½	½	0	½	0	1	0	½	½	0	-	½	1	½	½	1	8
16	(Soviet Union) Andor Lilienthal	0	½	0	0	0	½	1	1	0	0	0	½	½	½	½	-	1	½	1	½	8
17	(Soviet Union) Leonid Shamkovich	½	½	0	0	½	½	0	0	0	½	1	½	0	1	0	0	-	1	0	½	6½
18	(Soviet Union) Viacheslav Ragozin	0	0	½	0	½	1	½	0	½	0	0	½	½	1	½	½	0	-	0	½	6½
19	(Soviet Union) Iosif Livshin	0	0	0	½	½	0	1	0	0	0	0	0	1	½	½	0	1	1	-	0	6
20	(Soviet Union) Alexey Sokolsky	0	0	0	0	0	½	½	0	½	0	½	½	0	0	0	½	½	½	1	-	5
