= Boleslavsky =

Boleslavski, Boleslavsky, Boleslawski, or Boleslawsky are surnames of Slavic origin. They can refer to:

- Isaac Boleslavsky (1919–1977), Soviet chess player
- Richard Boleslawski (1889–1937), Polish director and actor
