= Vasily Byvshev =

Russian chess player

Personal information
- Born: Vasily Mikhailovich Byvshev; 18 February 1922 Starowo, Tver Governorate, RSFSR
- Died: 18 February 1998 (aged 76) Saint Petersburg, Russia

Chess career
- Title: USSR Master of Sports (1949); Honored Trainer of the RSFSR (1972)

Vasily Mikhailovich Byvshev (Russian: Василий Михайлович Бывшев; 18 February 1922 – 5 April 1998) was a Russian chess master. In the 1950s he was one of the strongest Soviet masters and he qualified three times for the USSR Chess Championship (in 1952, 1954 and 1956). Byvshev is best known for his accomplishments as a chess teacher. He was coach of women's world champion Lyudmila Rudenko and FIDE world champion Alexander Khalifman.

== Biography and chess career ==
At fifteen Byvshev entered the chess section of Leningrad Pioneer Palace and after a year of training he reached the first category. From 1940 he did military service. During the World War II he was wounded in the defense of Moscow and from then on, after a break, was employed in the air defense as a platoon leader. After his release from military service, he actively played tournament chess again. In a semi-final of the Soviet championship in Vilnius in 1949, he shared the 5th-6th with Georgi Bastrikow.

In the 1950s, Byvschew was three times in the Soviet championship finals. The 1952 championship in Moscow was turbulent for him. With half a point in the first five rounds, a good tournament result was hardly to be expected, but he won seven out of the next eight games and ended up sharing a decent 12th–13th place. Among his victims was Vasily Smyslov, Paul Keres and Isaac Boleslavsky, some of the best players in chess world. It was not easy for him the USSR Chess Championship in Kiev 1954 and Leningrad 1956. He was only able to move up into midfield with a strong final sprint. Alexander Konstantinopolsky described him as an attacking player who was extremely inventive, showing great imagination and the ability to calculate complicated variations.

As a valuable team player, he was able to show remarkable results, especially at national level. With the Leningrad team he won the Soviet team championship in 1953 and came second in 1955. In 1961, he won the Team Cup of the Sports Associations of the USSR with Burewestnik, having previously finished second twice with Nauka. In friendly matches between the Leningrad team and Hungary in 1957 and Budapest in 1959, he drew two games against Győző Forintos and achieved a 2–2 draw against Károly Honfi.

Bywschew worked as a youth coach in the Pioneer Palace from 1953 until the last days of his life. His best-known students include Alexander Khalifman, Lyudmila Rudenko and Irina Levitina. In 1972 he was awarded the honorary title of Honored Trainer of the RSFSR.
