= Gerstenfeld =

Gerstenfeld is a surname. Notable people with the surname include:

- Brad Garrett (born Brad H. Gerstenfeld in 1960), American comedian, actor, poker player, and producer
- Edward Gerstenfeld (1915–1943), Polish chess player
- Manfred Gerstenfeld (1937–2021), Austrian-born Israeli writer
