= Mark Stolberg =

Russian chess player

- Born: Mark Moiseevich Stolberg; 1922; Rostov-on-Don, Rostov Oblast, RSFSR
- Died: presumably 16 May 1942 (aged 19–20); Novorossiysk, Krasnodar Krai, RSFSR
- Occupation: Chess master

Mark Moiseevich Stolberg (Russian: Марк Моисеевич Стольберг; 1922 – 16 May 1942) was a Russian Jewish chess master.

Stolberg won the Rostov-on-Don City championship in 1938. The next year he finished in second place in a Soviet master candidates tournament. In 1940, Stolberg shared first place with Eduard Gerstenfeld in Kiev (the 12th USSR-ch semi-final), and tied for 13-16th in Moscow (the 12th USSR Chess Championship won jointly by Andor Lilienthal and Igor Bondarevsky) where he was the youngest participant. In June 1941, Stolberg was in fourth place in Rostov-on-Don (the 13th USSR-ch semi-final), when the German attack on the Soviet Union interrupted the event.

Stolberg joined the Soviet Army at the end of 1940, and went missing in action on 16 May 1942 in the battle of Malaya Zemlya (lit. "Minor Land"), waged against German troops.
