= Konstantinopolsky Opening =

Chess opening

Position: a8 black rook, c8 black bishop, d8 black queen, e8 black king, f8 black bishop, g8 black knight, h8 black rook, a7 black pawn, b7 black pawn, c7 black pawn, d7 black pawn, f7 black pawn, g7 black pawn, h7 black pawn, c6 black knight, e5 black pawn, e4 white pawn, f3 white knight, g3 white pawn, a2 white pawn, b2 white pawn, c2 white pawn, d2 white pawn, f2 white pawn, h2 white pawn, a1 white rook, b1 white knight, c1 white bishop, d1 white queen, e1 white king, f1 white bishop, h1 white rook
- Moves: 1.e4 e5 2.Nf3 Nc6 3.g3
- ECO: C44
- Origin: Konstantinopolsky vs. Ragozin (Moscow, 1956)
- Named after: Alexander Konstantinopolsky
- Parent: King's Knight Opening

The Konstantinopolsky Opening is a rarely played chess opening that begins with the following moves:

1. e4 e5
2. Nf3 Nc6
3. g3

== Description ==
According to The Oxford Companion to Chess, the Konstantinopolsky Opening was introduced to master play in a game between Alexander Konstantinopolsky and Viacheslav Ragozin in a team championship in Moscow in 1956. A slightly earlier example is McKinnon–Walker, U.S. Open Championship, Long Beach 1955, which was labelled a "King's Indian Reversed" in Chess Life magazine. White often intends to adopt a King's Indian Attack setup.

The name "Konstantinopolsky's opening" was used by David Bronstein in his book 200 Open Games (published in Russian in 1970). Bronstein employed the opening against Levente Lengyel in the 1964 Interzonal in Amsterdam.

The opening has been described as a form of "anti-preparation" that takes the game "out of book".

== See also ==
- List of chess openings
- List of chess openings named after people
