= Emanuel Rubinstein =

Polish chess player

Emanuel Rubinstein (born 23 March 1897, date of death unknown) was a Polish chess master.

In the 1920s, Emanuel Rubinstein from Cracow was a collaborator of the Wiener Schachzeitung. He took 4th at Cracow 1926 (Mieczysław Chwojnik won). He played for Cracow (+3 =1 –1) in the 1st Polish Team Chess Championship at Królewska Huta 1929, and in matches Cracow (Kraków) vs. Silesia (Śląsk) in 1932, 1937, and 1939. He tied for 2nd-4th in the Cracow City championship in 1938 (Henryk Scheier won), tied for 14-15th at Cracow 1938 (POL-ch, semi-final, Izaak Schächter won).

In 1939, when World War II broke out, he left Cracow for Lvov. In January/February 1941, he shared 4th with Schächter, behind Edward Gerstenfeld, Izaak Appel, and Henryk Friedman, in the Lvov City championship.

After the war, he took 10th in the Kraków City championship in 1947 (Aleksander Ameisen won).
