= Alexander Konstantinopolsky =

Soviet chess grandmaster (1910–1990)

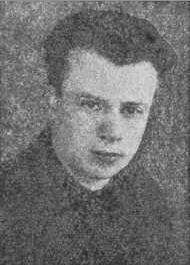
- Konstantinopolsky, ca. 1932

Personal information
- Born: Alexander Markovich Konstantinopolsky; 19 February 1910 Chudniv, Volhynian Governorate, Russian Empire
- Died: 21 September 1990 (aged 80) Moscow

Chess career
- Country: Soviet Union
- Title: Honorary Grandmaster (1983); International Master (1950); International Correspondence Chess Master (1966)

Alexander Markovich Konstantinopolsky (Russian: Алекса́ндр Ма́ркович Константино́польский; 19 February 1910 – 21 September 1990) was a Soviet chess player, trainer and writer. He was a five-time champion of Kiev, and trained the world title challenger David Bronstein from a young age. He was awarded the title of International Master (IM) by FIDE in 1950, won the first Soviet Correspondence Chess Championship in 1951, earned the IM title at correspondence in 1966, and earned the title of Honorary Grandmaster in 1983.

== Ukrainian master ==
Born in Chudniv, in the Volhynian Governorate of the Russian Empire, Konstantinopolsky was nearly 20 when he learned chess. This makes him one of the oldest top players in terms of learning the moves of the game. At the beginning of his career, Konstantinopolsky won the Kiev championships five consecutive times from 1932 to 1936. He played in seven Ukrainian SSR championships. In 1931, he tied for 3rd-5th in Kharkov (6th UKR-ch). In 1933, he took 3rd in Kharkov (7th UKR-ch). In 1936, he took 4th in Kiev (8th UKR-ch). In 1937, he tied for 3rd-4th in Kiev (9th UKR-ch), which was won by Fedor Bohatirchuk. In 1938, he took 3rd in Kiev (10th UKR-ch), which was won by Isaac Boleslavsky. In 1939, he took 3rd in Dnepropetrovsk (11th UKR-ch). In 1940, he tied for 8th-9th in Kiev (12th UKR-ch). Boleslavsky also won in both 1939 and 1940. Konstantinopolsky's early games from this period are largely missing from games databases. (portrait photo from his later years at bidmonta.com under Konstantinopolsky heading)

In 1936, Konstantinopolsky played in a Leningrad Young Masters' tournament, scoring 7½/14 in a strong field which played a double round robin format.

Konstantinopolsky played several times in Soviet Chess Championships. In 1931, he tied for 3rd-5th (7th URS-ch semifinal), in Moscow. In 1934, he tied for 11th-13th in Tbilisi (9th URS-ch sf). In April/May 1937, he tied for 2nd-3rd with Viacheslav Ragozin, behind Grigory Levenfish, in Tbilisi (10th URS-ch), with a score of 12/19. In 1938, he tied for 11th-12th in Kiev (URS-ch sf). In 1940, he tied for 4th-7th in Kiev (URS-ch sf), with a score of 9½/16. In September/October 1940, he tied for 13th-16th in Moscow (12th URS-ch), with a score of 8/19.

== Theorist and trainer ==
During the late 1930s, Konstantinopolsky trained young players and amateurs in Kiev, at the Palace of Young Pioneers. He was widely regarded as a friendly and kindly man. His prize pupil was the young David Bronstein, who eventually challenged for the World Championship title in 1951, drawing the match against Mikhail Botvinnik. Konstantinopolsky and Bronstein were close friends, and Konstantinopolsky served as Bronstein's second for the 1950 Candidates' playoff match in Moscow, against Isaac Boleslavsky, which Bronstein won by 7½-6½.

He was one of the Ukrainian pioneers who developed the King's Indian Defence into prominence, along with Boleslavsky and Bronstein. The variation had been considered suspect until the mid-1930s. During this time, he played one of the earliest games in the Yugoslav Attack against the Dragon Variation of the Sicilian Defence, a line which would become very popular about 20 years later. He also defended the Dutch Defence with success at a time when it was rarely played by top players. Konstantinopolsky had a very wide opening repertoire with both colours, a very valuable attribute which he passed on to his prize pupil Bronstein. He was also a formidable strategist and tactician, as the games selection shows.

== Grandmastership denied ==
He played in the tournament Leningrad / Moscow 1939, scoring an excellent 8½/17 against an exceptionally strong field. During World War II, he played in national tournaments. In 1940, he took 3rd in Lvov (Lviv, Lwów, Lemberg), which was won by Abram Khavin. The war then seems to have stopped his chess activity for about three years. In February 1943, he won in Kuibyshev. In April/May 1943, he took 6th in Sverdlovsk, a very strong tournament, with 6½/14; the event was won by Botvinnik. In August/September 1943, he took 2nd, behind Boleslavsky, in Kuibyshev. In 1943, he won a match against Yakov Rokhlin (+7 –0 =1). In 1944, he won a match against Lev Aronin (+6 –1 =5). In 1944, he moved to stay in Moscow. He played in the 1945 Moscow City Championship, probably on average the strongest such event in the world, scoring 9/16.

After the war, he played in several more Soviet championships. In 1945, he tied for 1st-3rd in Baku (URS-ch sf), with Alexander Kotov and Iosif Rudakovsky, each scoring 10½/15. In June 1945, he tied for 4th-6th in Moscow (14th URS-ch), with 10½/18; the tournament was won by Botvinnik. In 1947, he tied for 3rd-4th in Moscow (URS-ch sf). In 1948, he tied for 6th-9th in Moscow (16th URS-ch), with 9½/17; the tournament was won jointly by Bronstein and Alexander Kotov. In 1950, he tied for 2nd-4th in Tartu (URS-ch sf), with a score of 10/15. In 1950, he tied for 5th-6th in Moscow (18th URS-ch), with 7½/14; the tournament was won by Paul Keres. In 1952, he took 16th in Moscow (20th URS-ch), with 7/19; the tournament was won jointly by Botvinnik and Mark Taimanov. He played in the Soviet Team Championship, Riga 1954, scoring 5½/10; this was his last really strong performance. His over-the-board play seems to have largely stopped about 1955, as he concentrated more on correspondence chess and on his job as a trainer and coach. He did play occasionally over-the-board in later years. The website Chessmetrics.com, which provides retroactive ratings for older players, ranks him as 11th in the world in 1945.

So, his best results in the Soviet national championships, which during that period were the strongest tournaments in the world, were four times in the top six (1937, 1945, 1948, 1950). In any virtually other nation in the world during that period, he would have been its national champion, and an almost certain Grandmaster. Because the Soviet chess talent was so deep, he never earned the highest chess title. His best games show he could hold his own with anyone in the USSR, with victories over Botvinnik, Keres, Kotov, Boleslavsky, Grigory Levenfish, Vasily Smyslov, Salo Flohr, Alexander Tolush, Viacheslav Ragozin, Andor Lilienthal, Viktor Korchnoi, Yuri Averbakh, Ratmir Kholmov, Boris Verlinsky, and others.

== Later years ==
In 1948–1951, Konstantinopolsky won the 1st Soviet Correspondence Chess Championship. He was awarded the title of International Master (IM) in 1950, that of International Master of correspondence chess (IMC) in 1966, and that of Honorary Grandmaster (HGM) in 1983. According to his game files, he only had one chance to play over-the-board in an international tournament outside the Soviet Union, the 'B' section of Amsterdam 1966, when he was well past his prime at age 56. Even so, he scored a creditable 5/9. He continued to work as one of the Soviet Union's most respected trainers well into his 70s.

He introduced an opening which is named for him as the Konstantinopolsky Opening (1.e4 e5 2.Nf3 Nc6 3.g3), against Viacheslav Ragozin at Moscow 1956. He published two chess books after age 70.

Konstantinopolsky died in Moscow on September 21, 1990, at age 80.

== Notable chess games ==
- Mikhail Botvinnik vs Alexander Konstantinopolsky, USSR Championship semi-final, Moscow 1931, Dutch Defence (A90), 0-1

Konstantinopolsky defeats that year's Soviet champion.

- Ilia Kan vs Alexander Konstantinopolsky, USSR Young Masters tournament, Leningrad 1936, Dutch Defence, Stonewall Variation (A95), 0-1 Another Dutch game shows a definite flair for this sharp defence.
- Alexander Konstantinopolsky vs Viacheslav Ragozin, USSR Young Masters tournament, Leningrad 1936, King's Indian Attack / Reversed Grunfeld (A07), 1-0 Black goes for complications and gets outcombined.
- Alexander Konstantinopolsky vs Alexander Tolush, Moscow 1936, Queen's Pawn Game (A47), 1-0 Tolush gets too greedy, grabs material with his King in the centre, and gets demolished.
- Vladimir Alatortsev vs Alexander Konstantinopolsky, USSR Championship, Tbilisi 1937, Dutch Defence, Stonewall Variation (A91), 0-1 Konstantinopolsky again shows his virtuosity with the Dutch.
- Alexander Konstantinopolsky vs Ilia Kan, USSR Championship, Tbilisi 1937, Sicilian Defence, Dragon Variation, Yugoslav Attack (B76), 1-0 One of the first games with this dangerous plan of long castling by White.
- Alexander Konstantinopolsky vs Samuel Reshevsky, Leningrad / Moscow 1939, Neo-Grunfeld Defence (D78), 1-0 Reshevsky was one of the very top players outside the USSR; this was one of the few games where Konstantinopolsky got the chance to meet a non-Soviet player.
- Alexander Konstantinopolsky vs Salo Flohr, USSR Championship, Moscow 1945, Caro-Kann Defence, Two Knights' Variation (B10), 1-0 Flohr was a guru with the Caro-Kann, but meets his match here.
- Boris Verlinsky vs Alexander Konstantinopolsky, Moscow Championship 1945, King's Indian Defence, Fianchetto Variation (E67), 0-1 One of the influential games using the King's Indian Defence from this period, as the line was rising in popularity.
- Grigory Levenfish vs Alexander Konstantinopolsky, Leningrad 1947, Caro-Kann Defence, Bronstein-Larsen Variation (B16), 0-1

An exchange sacrifice sets up a very deep trap winning White's Queen; this line was eventually jointly named for Konstantinopolsky's pupil Bronstein.

- Paul Keres vs Alexander Konstantinopolsky, USSR Championship, Moscow 1948, Caro-Kann Defence, Panov-Botvinnik Attack (B14), 0-1 Black's strong Kingside attack outwits the formidable tactician Keres, the #3 player in the world at the time.
- Alexander Kotov vs Alexander Konstantinopolsky, USSR Championship, Moscow 1948, King's Indian Defence, Fianchetto Variation (E67), 0-1 Another dandy with the King's Indian to defeat that year's Soviet co-champion.
- Alexander Konstantinopolsky vs Andor Lilienthal, USSR Championship, Moscow 1948, Grunfeld Defence, Exchange Variation (D85), 1-0

Lilienthal was one of the world's strongest players during the 1940s.

- Alexander Konstantinopolsky vs Vasily Smyslov, USSR Championship, Moscow 1948, Semi-Slav / Grunfeld-Schlechter Defence (D30), 1-0 Smyslov had finished second in the World Championship tournament earlier that year.
- Ratmir Kholmov vs Alexander Konstantinopolsky, USSR Championship, Moscow 1948, Queen's Pawn Game / London System / King's Indian Defence (A46), 0-1 White avoids main-line King's Indian theory to no avail.
- Alexander Konstantinopolsky vs Isaac Boleslavsky, USSR Championship, Moscow 1950, King's Indian Defence, Fianchetto Variation (E68), 1-0 This game has Konstantinopolsky on the White side of the King's Indian scoring a win over the world's #3 player that year!
- Yuri Averbakh vs Alexander Konstantinopolsky, USSR Championship, Moscow 1950, Ruy Lopez, Closed (C92), 0-1 Future Soviet Champion Averbakh gets deposed here.
- Alexander Konstantinopolsky vs Viktor Korchnoi, USSR Championship, Moscow 1952, Queen's Pawn Game (D03), 1-0 By some accounts, Korchnoi is the #6-ranked player of all time, so any win over him is noteworthy.
- Alexander Konstantinopolsky vs Alexei Suetin, USSR Championship, Moscow 1952, Grunfeld Defence, Russian Variation (D95), 1-0 This method of play in the opening was just being developed then, so this was one of the important early games.

== Writings and further reading ==
- The Caro-Kann Defence by Alexander Konstantinopolsky and Aron Weiz, Heidelberg (Schmaus 1982), ISBN .......... (in German)
- Vienna Game, by Alexander Konstantinopolsky, London (Batsford 1986), ISBN 0-7134-3615-8
- The Sorcerer's Apprentice by David Bronstein and Tom Furstenberg, London (Cadogan 1995), ISBN 1-85744-151-6
