= Viacheslav Ragozin =

Soviet chess grandmaster (1908–1962)

Personal information
- Born: Viacheslav Vasilyevich Ragozin; 8 October 1908 Saint Petersburg, Russian Empire
- Died: 11 March 1962 (aged 53) Moscow, Russian SFSR, Soviet Union

Chess career
- Country: Soviet Union
- Title: Grandmaster (1950); ICCF Grandmaster (1959)
- ICCF World Champion: 1956–59

Viacheslav Vasilyevich Ragozin (Russian: Вячесла́в Васи́льевич Раго́зин; 8 October 1908 – 11 March 1962) was a Soviet chess player, writer and editor. He was world champion in correspondence chess and held the title of Grandmaster in both over-the-board and correspondence chess.

== Chess career ==
Born in Saint Petersburg, Ragozin's chess career first came to the fore with a series of excellent results in the 1930s. In the earliest of these, he defeated the respected master Alexander Ilyin-Genevsky in a 1930 match and was himself awarded the title of Soviet master. At Moscow 1935, he won the best game prize for his victory against Andor Lilienthal. At the very strong Moscow tournament of 1936, he beat Salo Flohr and Emanuel Lasker and came very close to defeating José Raúl Capablanca, the ever-resourceful ex-world champion scrambling to find a draw by perpetual check at the game's frantic conclusion. There followed a victory at the Leningrad championship of 1936 and second place shared with Alexander Konstantinopolsky (behind Grigory Levenfish) at the Soviet Championship of 1937. At the 1939 Leningrad-Moscow tournament, he finished third equal, behind Flohr and Samuel Reshevsky, but ahead of Paul Keres.

Success continued into the 1940s with first prize at Sverdlovsk in 1942 and a repeat triumph at the Leningrad Championship of 1945. In 1946, he finished outright first at Helsinki and beat Igor Bondarevsky in a match. His greatest achievement in over-the-board chess then followed at the Mikhail Chigorin Memorial tournament of 1947, held in Moscow, where he placed second, half a point behind Mikhail Botvinnik and ahead of Vasily Smyslov, Isaac Boleslavsky and Keres.

By the 1950s, he and most of his generation had been overtaken by the new wave of players emerging from the Soviet chess schools, but Ragozin continued his patronage of the Soviet Championship, competing a total of eleven times, from 1934 to 1956. Of his rare post-1950 international tournament appearances, his best result came at the 1956 Wilhelm Steinitz Memorial tournament in Mariánské Lázně, where he finished second behind Miroslav Filip, ahead of Flohr, Luděk Pachman, Gideon Ståhlberg and a young Wolfgang Uhlmann.

Throughout his life, he displayed an interest and talent for almost every aspect of the game of chess. For his over-the-board play, he was awarded the title of Grandmaster by FIDE in 1950 and in 1951 he obtained that of International Arbiter. From 1956–1958, his main focus switched to correspondence chess, where he showed that he was also an expert analyst and theoretician by becoming the second ICCF World Correspondence Chess Champion in 1959 (winning 9 games, drawing 4 games, and losing 1 game). His correspondence chess grandmaster title was awarded the same year.

== Second to Botvinnik ==
Ragozin's achievements and creative playing style attracted the attention of then world champion Mikhail Botvinnik. He recognized that Ragozin would make an ideal sparring partner and they played many secret training matches, as Botvinnik prepared for important world championship encounters. Ragozin's style had always been experimental and risky, particularly with regard to the sacrifice of pawns for the initiative. As Botvinnik was attempting to put together a repertoire of solid, reliable openings, it was vital that they were rigorously tested against any latent sacrificial play. Accordingly, many historians attribute Ragozin's contribution as a significant factor in Botvinnik's success.

Ragozin and Botvinnik also teamed up to train for the 1944 Soviet championship. To simulate the noise that would be present in the tournament hall, they practiced with the radio blasting at high volume. Botvinnik won the tournament, whilst Ragozin, placing 13th out of 17, blamed his defeats on the unusual quietness of his surroundings.

== Later career ==
From 1946 to 1955, Ragozin edited the magazine publication Shakhmaty v SSSR as well as maintaining a career as a civil engineer. He was vice-president of FIDE from 1950 through 1961.

He died in Moscow while putting together a collection of his best games, which his friends completed for publication in 1964, under the title Izbrannye Partii Ragozina (Ragozin's Selected Games). It contains 74 games spanning his career.

== Contributions to opening theory ==
His contributions to opening theory mainly concerned the development of systems by which Black could achieve equality in the Queen's Gambit and Nimzo-Indian complexes.

The Queen's Gambit Declined Ragozin Defence, typically arrived at via the moves 1.d4 d5 2.c4 e6 3.Nf3 Nf6 4.Nc3 Bb4 (or by transposition) offering Black active play from the start, has enjoyed a resurgence in recent times.

== Notable chess games ==
- Viacheslav Ragozin vs P Noskov, Moscow-Leningrad Match 1930, Sicilian Defense: French Variation. Normal (B40), 1-0 An exchange sacrifice for the sake of attack
- Andre Lilienthal vs Viacheslav Ragozin, 1935, Nimzo-Indian, Samisch (E24), 0-1 The power of advanced pawns
- Emanuel Lasker vs Viacheslav Ragozin, It 1936, Sicilian, Dragon, Classical (B73), 0-1 Lasker is lost in tactical complications
- Petar Trifunovic vs Vacheslav Ragozin, Moscow 1947, Dutch Defence, 0-1 White's obsession with achieving the e4 break makes him susceptible to a neat tactic.
- Volf Bergraser vs Viacheslav Ragozin, corr-2 1956, King's Indian, Fianchetto, Yugoslav Panno (E66), 0-1 A very complicated game ending with a queen sacrifice – and white is not able to keep an advanced pawn
- Ragozin vs Tal, Riga 1951, Semi Slav Noteboom (D31), 0-1 40 year old Ragozin loses to 15 year old Tal who displays characteristic panache and ability to grab and hold the initiative.

== Notes ==
Preceded by (Australia) Cecil Purdy	World Correspondence Chess Champion; 1956–1959	Succeeded by (Belgium) Alberic O'Kelly de Galway
