= Abram Khavin =

Ukrainian chess player

Abram Leonidovich Khavin (1914 – January 19, 1974, Kyiv) was a Ukrainian chess master.

In 1937, he took 6th in Kyiv (9th UKR-ch, Fedor Bogatyrchuk won). In 1938, he tied for 4-6th in Kyiv (10th UKR-ch, Isaac Boleslavsky won).

During World War II, he won in Lviv in 1940 (West UKR-ch); In 1940, he also took 10th in Kyiv (12th UKR-ch, Boleslavsky won) and took 11th in Kyiv (USSR-ch, sf). In June 1941, he played in interrupted (because of the German–Soviet war) tournament in Rostov-on-Don (USSR-ch, sf). In 1944 he shared 1st in Omsk (USSR-ch, sf). and tied for 11-13th in Moscow (13th USSR-ch, Mikhail Botvinnik won).

After the war, he tied for 5-8th at Kyiv 1948 (17th UKR-ch, Alexey Sokolsky won). In 1951 he took 6th in Kyiv (USSR-ch, qf). In 1952 he took 7th in Kyiv (USSR-ch, qf). In 1954 he won in Kyiv (23rd UKR-ch).
