= Igor Bondarevsky =

Soviet chess grandmaster and writer (1913–1979)

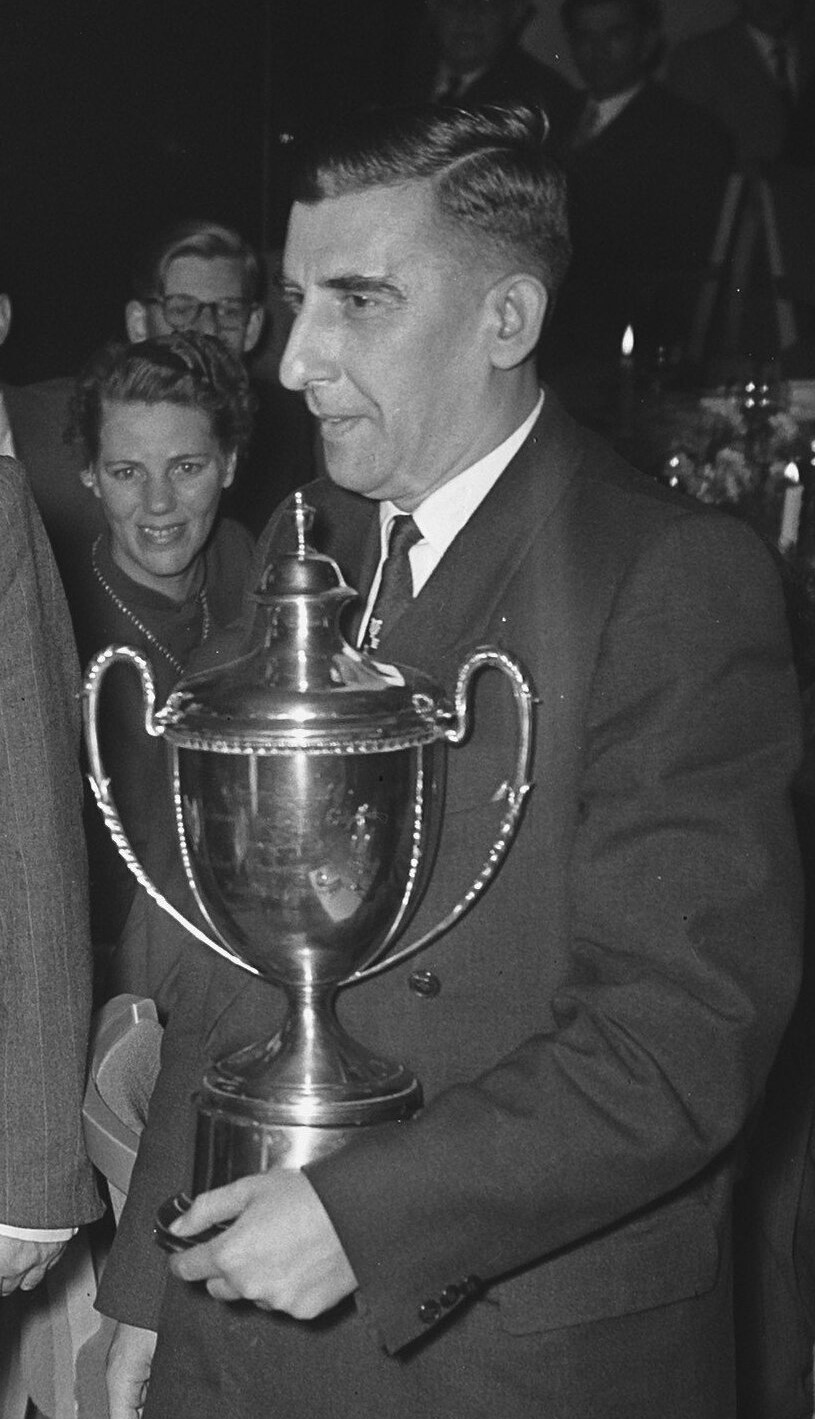
- Bondarevsky (1954)

Personal information
- Born: May 12, 1913 Rostov-on-Don, Russia
- Died: June 14, 1979 (aged 66) Pyatigorsk, Soviet Union
- Spouse: Valentina Kozlovskaya

Chess career
- Country: Soviet Union
- Title: Grandmaster (1950); ICCF Grandmaster (1961)
- Peak rating: 2430 (July 1972)
- ICCF peak rating: 2625 (July 1992)

Igor Zakharovich Bondarevsky (Russian: Игорь Захарович Бондаревский; May 12, 1913 – June 14, 1979) was a Soviet chess player, trainer, and chess author. He held the title of grandmaster in both over-the-board and correspondence chess. Bondarevsky shared the 1940 Soviet title, and later coached World Champion Boris Spassky.

== Early years ==
Igor Bondarevsky was born on May 12, 1913.

He played in the 5th Russian Championship, Gorky 1935, scoring 4/9 points for a tied 6–7th place; the winner was Alexander Tolush. The next year, he won an All-Union first category tournament in Leningrad, with 11½/14, unbeaten, by two points. This result earned him an invitation to the Soviet championship to be played the next year. At Moscow 1937, his first international event, Bondarevsky struggled with a score of 2½/7, for a tied 7–8th place; the winner was Reuben Fine; however, he recovered with a solid performance in his first Soviet Chess Championship (at its tenth edition, Tbilisi 1937), with 9½/19 and a shared 10-12th place; the winner was Grigory Levenfish. Bondarevsky qualified from the 11th USSR Championship semi-final 1938 with 10½/17, for a shared 3rd–4th place; the winner was Mikhail Botvinnik. Another disappointing performance followed at the very strong international Leningrad–Moscow event in 1939 with only 5/17 for 17th place; the winner was Salo Flohr.

== Joins the Soviet elite, Soviet champion ==
Bondarevsky joined the Soviet élite by placing sixth at the 11th USSR Championship, Leningrad 1939, with 10/17, a performance sufficient to automatically qualify him for the 12th final. He reached his career peak the following year by sharing first place with Andor Lilienthal at the 12th USSR championship, Moscow 1940, ahead of Paul Keres, Isaac Boleslavsky and Botvinnik. Surprisingly there was no play-off between the two winners; an "Absolute USSR Championship" was arranged in 1941 instead, staged in Leningrad and Moscow, an unprecedented four-cycle competition of six grandmasters called the match tournament for the title of Absolute USSR Champion between the top six finishers of the 12th final. This was one of the strongest tournaments ever held up to then, with six of the world's top fifteen players. Botvinnik who failed badly in the regular championship 1940 won that additional event in 1941, with the runner-up being Keres, after which came Boleslavsky, Vasily Smyslov, Lilienthal and Bondarevsky in last place.

Bondarevsky played in the 1948 Interzonal at Saltsjöbaden, sharing sixth-ninth place, and qualifying for the Candidates Tournament at Budapest 1950, but he was unable to play because of illness. Thereafter he played only a few tournaments, a notable result being his second place behind Svetozar Gligorić at the Hastings Congress 1960/61.

He was among the 27 players named International Grandmaster in 1950 by the World Chess Federation (FIDE) on its inaugural list. He was awarded the International Arbiter title in 1954, and the International Grandmaster of Correspondence Chess (GMC) title in 1961.

== Coaches the World Champion ==
Bondarevsky coached Boris Spassky during his ascent to the World Chess Championship, beginning in the early 1960s, culminating with Spassky's win over Tigran Petrosian in the 1969 title match. In 1977/1978, Bondarevsky assisted Spassky during his Candidates Final Match vs Victor Korchnoi.

== Personal life ==
Bondarevsky was an economist by profession. He was married to Valentina Kozlovskaya, also a chess player.

He died on June 14, 1979.

== Books ==
Igor Bondarevsky authored a number of chess books.
