= Mikhail Botvinnik =

Soviet chess grandmaster (1911–1995)

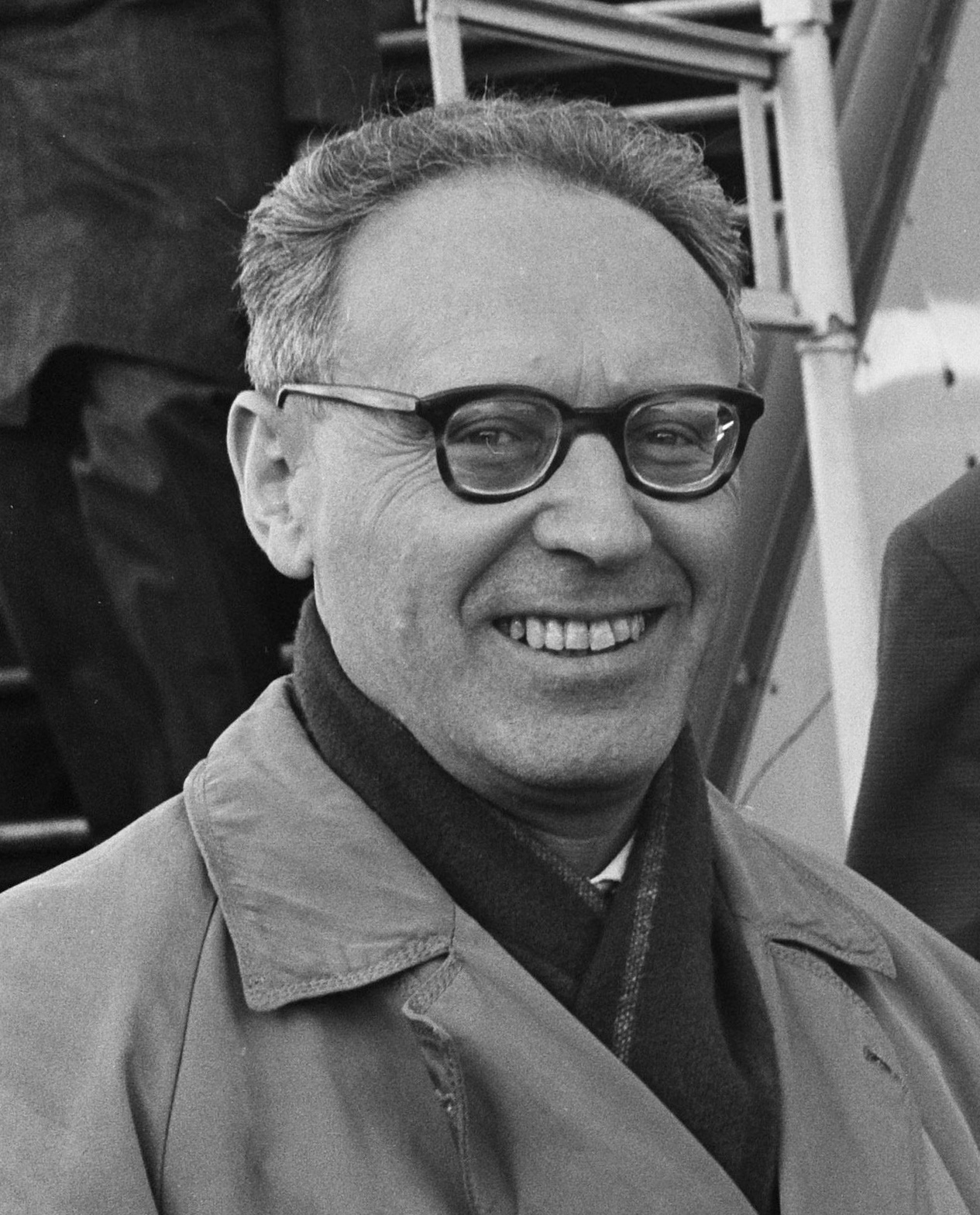
- Botvinnik in 1962

Personal information
- Born: Mikhail Moiseyevich Botvinnik; August 17, 1911 Kuokkala, Grand Duchy of Finland, Russian Empire
- Died: May 5, 1995 (aged 83) Moscow, Russia
- Education: Leningrad Polytechnic Institute

Chess career
- Country: Soviet Union
- Title: Grandmaster (1950)
- World Champion: 1948–1957; 1958–1960; 1961–1963
- Peak rating: 2630 (July 1971)
- Peak ranking: No. 7 (July 1971)

Mikhail Moiseyevich Botvinnik (Russian: Михаи́л Моисе́евич Ботви́нник; IPA: [mʲɪxɐˈil məɪˈsʲejɪvʲɪdʑ‿bɐˈtvʲinʲːɪk]; 17 August [O.S. 4 August] 1911 – May 5, 1995) was a Soviet and Russian chess grandmaster who held five world titles in three different reigns. The sixth World Chess Champion, he also worked as an electrical engineer and computer scientist and was a pioneer in computer chess, the last of which he was awarded an honorary mathematics degree for.

Botvinnik was the first world-class player to develop within the Soviet Union. He played a major role in the organization of chess, making a significant contribution to the design of the World Chess Championship system after World War II and becoming a leading member of the coaching system that enabled the Soviet Union to dominate top-class chess during that time. His pupils include World Champions Anatoly Karpov, Garry Kasparov, and Vladimir Kramnik. He is often described as the patriarch of the Soviet chess school and is revered for his analytical approach to chess.

== Early years ==
Botvinnik was born on August 17, 1911, in what was then Kuokkala, Vyborg Governorate, Grand Duchy of Finland, now the district of Repino in Saint Petersburg. His parents were Russian Jews; his father, Moisei Botvinnik (1878–1931), was a dental technician and his mother, Shifra (Serafima) Rabinovich (1876–1952), a dentist, which allowed the family to live outside the Pale of Settlement, to which most Jews in the Russian Empire were restricted at the time. As a result, Botvinnik grew up in Saint Petersburg's Nevsky Prospect. His father forbade speaking Yiddish at home, and Mikhail and his older brother Isaak "Issy" attended Soviet schools. Botvinnik later recounted, "I was asked once, "What do you consider yourself to be from the point of view of nationality?" My reply was, "Yes, my position is 'complicated'. I am a Jew by blood, a Russian by culture, Soviet by upbringing."" On his religious views, he called himself an atheist.

In 1920, his mother became ill and his father left the family, but maintained contact with the children, even after his second marriage to a Russian woman. At about the same time, Botvinnik started reading newspapers, and became a committed communist.

In autumn 1923, at the age of twelve, Botvinnik was taught chess by a school friend of his older brother, using a home-made set, and instantly fell in love with the game. He finished in mid-table in the school championship, sought advice from another of his brother's friends, and concluded that for him it was better to think out "concrete concepts" and then derive general principles from these – and went on to beat his brother's friend quite easily. In winter 1924, Botvinnik won his school's championship, and exaggerated his age by three years in order to become a member of the Petrograd Chess Assembly – to which its president turned a blind eye. Botvinnik won his first two tournaments organized by the Assembly. Shortly afterwards, Nikolai Krylenko, a devoted chess player and leading member of the Soviet legal system who later organized Joseph Stalin's show trials, began building a huge nationwide chess organization, and the Assembly was replaced by a club in the city's Palace of Labour.

To test the strength of Soviet chess masters, Krylenko organized the Moscow 1925 chess tournament. On a rest day during the event, world champion José Raúl Capablanca gave a simultaneous exhibition in Leningrad. Botvinnik was selected as one of his opponents, and won his game. In 1926, he reached the final stage of the Leningrad championship. Later that year, he was selected for Leningrad's team in a match against Stockholm, held in Sweden, and scored +1=1 against the future grandmaster Gösta Stoltz. On his return, he entertained his schoolmates with a vivid account of the rough sea journey back to Russia. Botvinnik was commissioned to annotate two games from the match, and the fact that his analyses were to be published made him aware of the need for objectivity. In December 1926, he became a candidate member of his school's Komsomol branch. Around this time his mother became concerned about his poor physique, and as a result he started a programme of daily exercise, which he maintained for most of his life.

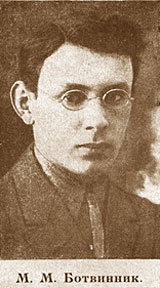
Botvinnik in 1927

When Botvinnik finished the school curriculum, he was below the minimum age for the entrance examinations for higher education. While waiting, he qualified for his first USSR Championship final stage in 1927 as the youngest player ever at that time, tied for fifth and sixth places and gained the title of master. He wanted to study Electrical Technology at the Leningrad Polytechnical Institute and passed the entrance examination; however, there was a persistent excess of applications for this course and the Proletstud, which controlled admissions, had a policy of admitting only children of engineers and industrial workers. After an appeal by a local chess official, he was admitted in 1928 to Leningrad University's Mathematics Department. In January 1929, Botvinnik played for Leningrad in the student team chess championship against Moscow. Leningrad won and the team manager, who was also deputy chairman of the Proletstud, secured Botvinnik a transfer to the Polytechnic's Electromechanical Department, where he was one of only four students who entered straight from school. As a result, he had to do a whole year's work in five months, and failed one of the examinations. Early in the same year he placed joint third in the semi-final stage of the USSR Championship, and thus failed to reach the final stage.

His early progress was fairly rapid, mostly under the training of Soviet Master and coach Abram Model, in Leningrad; Model taught Botvinnik the Winawer Variation of the French Defence, which was then regarded as inferior for Black, but Botvinnik analysed it more deeply and played this variation with great success.

Botvinnik won the Leningrad Masters' tournament in 1930 with a score of 6½/8, following this up the next year by winning the championship of Leningrad by 2½ points over former Soviet champion Peter Romanovsky.

In 1935, Botvinnik married Gayane Davidovna Ananova, of Armenian descent, who was the daughter of his algebra and geometry teacher. She was a student at the Vaganova Academy of Russian Ballet in Leningrad and, later, a ballerina in the Bolshoi Theatre. They had one daughter, named Olga, who was born in 1942.

== Soviet champion ==
Botvinnik vs. Yudovich,
USSR Championship 1933

Position: a8 black rook, c8 black bishop, f8 black rook, b7 black pawn, d7 black knight, e7 black queen, g7 black bishop, b6 black knight, c6 black pawn, e6 black pawn, g6 black king, h6 black pawn, a5 black pawn, d4 white pawn, e4 white knight, b3 white pawn, e3 white bishop, c2 white queen, e2 white bishop, f2 white pawn, g2 white pawn, h2 white pawn, c1 white rook, d1 white rook, g1 white king

White to move
After sacrificing a piece to expose Black's king, Botvinnik played 1.Bh5+ and Yudovich resigned since mate is inevitable, e.g. 1...Kxh5 2.Ng3+ Kg4 3.Qe4+ Rf4 4.Qxf4#

In 1931, at the age of 20, Botvinnik won his first Soviet Championship in Moscow, scoring 13½ out of 17. He commented that the field was not very strong, as some of the pre-Revolution masters were absent. In late summer 1931, he graduated with a degree in electrical engineering, after completing a practical assignment on temporary transmission lines at the Dnieper Hydroelectric Station. He stayed on at the Leningrad Polytechnical Institute to study for a Candidate of Sciences degree.

In 1933, Botvinnik repeated his Soviet Championship win, in his home city of Leningrad, with 14/19, describing the results as evidence that Krylenko's plan to develop a new generation of Soviet masters had borne fruit. He and other young masters successfully requested the support of a senior Leningrad Communist Party official in arranging contests involving both Soviet and foreign players, as there had been none since the Moscow 1925 chess tournament. Soon afterwards, Botvinnik was informed that Alexander Ilyin-Genevsky, one of the older Soviet masters and a member of the Soviet embassy in Prague, had arranged a match between Botvinnik and Salo Flohr, a Czech grandmaster who was then regarded as one of the most credible contenders for Alexander Alekhine's World Chess Championship title. The highest-level chess officials in the Soviet Union opposed this on the grounds that Botvinnik stood little chance against such a strong international opponent. In spite of this attempt to dissuade him, Krylenko insisted on staging the match, saying that "We have to know our real strength."

Botvinnik used what he regarded as the first version of his method of preparing for a contest, but fell two games behind by the end of the first six, played in Moscow. However, aided by his old friend Ragozin and coach Abram Model, he leveled the score in Leningrad and the match was drawn. When describing the post-match party, Botvinnik wrote that at the time he danced the foxtrot and Charleston to a professional standard.

In his first tournament outside the USSR, the Hastings 1934–35, Botvinnik achieved only a tie for 5th–6th places, with 5/9. He wrote that, in London after the tournament, Emanuel Lasker said his arrival only two hours before the first round began was a serious mistake and that he should have allowed ten days for acclimatization. Botvinnik wrote that he did not make this mistake again.

Botvinnik placed first equal with Flohr, ½ point ahead of Lasker and one point ahead of José Raúl Capablanca, in Moscow's second International Tournament, held in 1935. After consulting Capablanca and Lasker, Krylenko proposed to award Botvinnik the title Grandmaster, but Botvinnik objected that "titles were not the point." However, he accepted a free car and a 67% increase in his postgraduate study grant, both provided by the People's Commissariat of Heavy Industry.

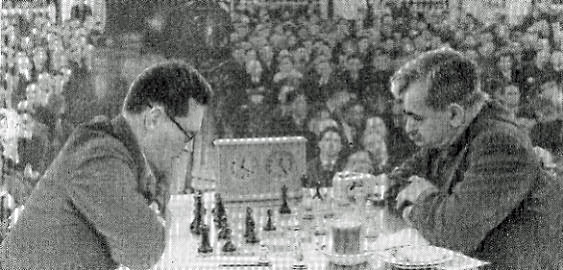
Botvinnik vs. Lasker, 1936

He later reported to Krylenko that the 1935 tournament made it difficult to judge the strength of the top Soviet players, as it included a mixture of top-class and weaker players. Botvinnik advocated a double round-robin event featuring the top five Soviet players and the five strongest non-Soviet players available. Despite politicking over the Soviet choices, both Krylenko and the Central Committee of the Komsomol quickly authorised the tournament. This was played in Moscow in June 1936, and Botvinnik finished second, one point behind Capablanca and 2½ ahead of Flohr. However, he took consolation from the fact the Soviet Union's best had held their own against top-class competition.

In early winter, 1936, Botvinnik was invited to play in a tournament at Nottingham, England. Krylenko authorised his participation and, to help Botvinnik play at his best, allowed Botvinnik's wife to accompany him – a privilege rarely extended to chess players at any time in Soviet history. Taking Lasker's advice, Botvinnik arrived ten days before play started. Although his Soviet rivals forecast disaster for him, he scored an undefeated shared first place (+6=8) with Capablanca, ½ point ahead of current World Champion Max Euwe and rising American stars Reuben Fine and Samuel Reshevsky, and 1 point ahead of ex-champion Alexander Alekhine. This was the first tournament victory by a Soviet master outside his own country. When the result reached Russia, Krylenko drafted a letter to be sent in Botvinnik's name to Stalin. On returning to Russia, Botvinnik discovered he had been awarded the "Mark of Honour".

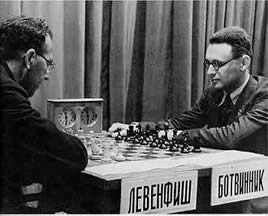
Levenfish vs. Botvinnik (right), 1937

Three weeks later, Botvinnik began work on his dissertation for the Candidate's degree, obtaining this in June 1937, after his supervisor described the dissertation as "short and good", and the first work in its field. As a result of his efforts, he missed the 1937 Soviet championship, won by Grigory Levenfish, who was then nearly fifty. Later in 1937, Botvinnik drew a match of thirteen games against Levenfish. Botvinnik challenged Levenfish, writing that Krylenko, angered by Botvinnik's absence from the tournament, ordered the match.

Botvinnik won further Soviet Championship titles in 1939, 1944, 1945, and 1952, bringing his total to six. In 1945, he dominated the tournament, scoring 15/17; however, in 1952 he tied with Mark Taimanov and won the play-off match.

== World title contender ==
In 1938, the world's top eight players met in the Netherlands to compete in the AVRO tournament, whose winner was supposed to get a title match with the World Champion, Alexander Alekhine. Botvinnik placed third, behind Paul Keres and Reuben Fine. According to Botvinnik, Alekhine was most interested in playing an opponent who could raise the funds. After consulting the nearest available Soviet officials, Botvinnik discreetly challenged Alekhine, who promptly accepted, subject to conditions that would enable him to acclimatize in Russia and get some high-quality competitive practice a few months before the match. In Botvinnik's opinion, Alekhine was partly motivated by the desire for a reconciliation with the Soviet authorities, so that he could again visit his homeland. The match, including funding, was authorised at the highest Soviet political level in January 1939; however, a letter of confirmation was only sent two months later – in Botvinnik's opinion, because of opposition by his Soviet rivals, especially those who had become prominent before the Russian Revolution – and the outbreak of World War II prevented a World Championship match.

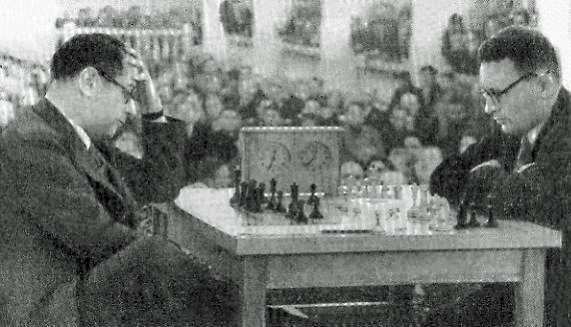
Capablanca vs. Botvinnik in 1936

In spring 1939, Botvinnik won the USSR Championship, and his book on the tournament described the approach to preparation which he had been developing since 1933. One striking feature of this was emphasis on opening preparation in order to gain a permanent positional advantage in the middlegame, rather than seeking immediate tactical surprises that could only be used once.

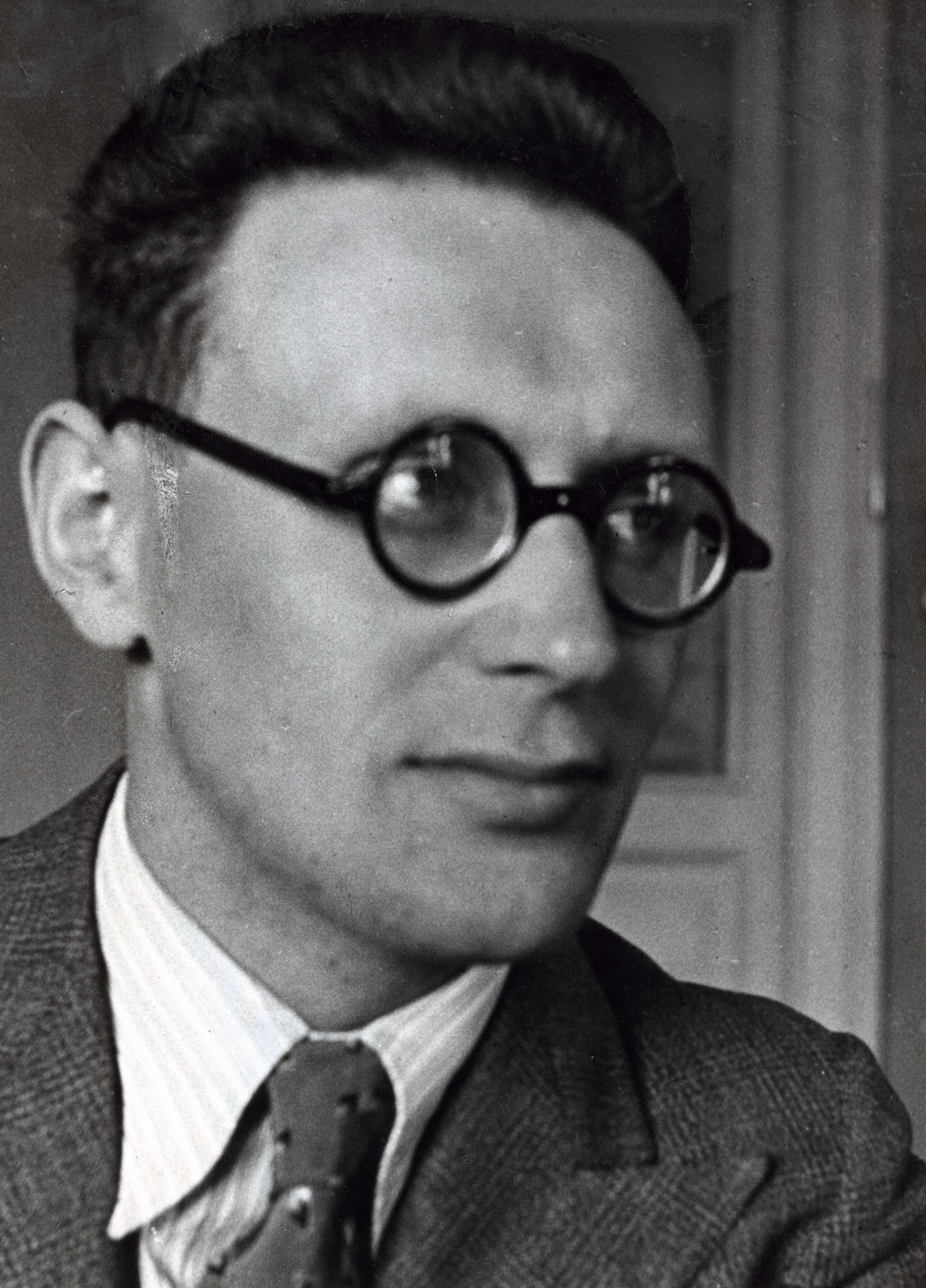
Botvinnik in 1936

Botvinnik took an early lead in the 1940 USSR Championship, but faded badly in the later stages, eventually sharing fifth place. He attributed this to the unaccustomed difficulty of concentrating in a party-like atmosphere filled with noise and tobacco smoke. Botvinnik wrote to a friendly official, commenting that the champion was to be the winner of a match between Igor Bondarevsky and Andor Lilienthal, who had tied for first place, but had no achievements in international competition. The official's efforts led to a tournament for the title of "Absolute Champion of the USSR", whose official aim was to identify a Soviet challenger for Alekhine's title. The contestants were the top six finishers in the Soviet Championship – Bondarevsky, Lilienthal, Paul Keres (whose home country, Estonia, had recently been annexed by the Soviet Union), future World Champion Vasily Smyslov, Isaac Boleslavsky and Botvinnik – who were to play a quadruple round-robin. Botvinnik's preparation with his second, Viacheslav Ragozin, included training matches in noisy, smoky rooms and he slept in the playing room, without opening the window. He won the tournament, 2½ points ahead of Keres and three ahead of Smyslov; moreover, with plus scores in the "mini-matches" against all his rivals.

In June 1941, Nazi Germany invaded the Soviet Union. Botvinnik's wife Gayane, a ballerina, told him that her colleagues at the Kirov Opera and Ballet Theatre were being evacuated to the city of Perm, then known as Molotov in honour of Vyacheslav Molotov. The family found an apartment there, and Botvinnik obtained a job with the local electricity supply organization – at the lowest pay rate and on condition that he did no research, as he had only a Candidate's degree. Botvinnik's only child, a daughter named Olya, was born in Perm in April 1942.

In the evenings, Botvinnik wrote a book in which he annotated all the games of the "Absolute Championship of the USSR", in order to maintain his analytic skills in readiness for a match with Alekhine. His work included wood-cutting for fuel, which left him with insufficient energy for chess analysis. Botvinnik obtained from Molotov an order that he should be given three days off normal work in order to study chess.

In 1943, after a two-year lay-off from competitive chess, Botvinnik won a tournament in Sverdlovsk, scoring 1½ out of 2 against each of his seven competitors – who included Smyslov, Vladimir Makogonov, Boleslavsky, and Ragozin. Chessbase regards this as one of the fifty strongest tournaments between 1851 and 1986.

Shortly afterwards, Botvinnik was urged to return to Moscow by the People's Commissar for Power Stations, an admirer and subsequent good friend. On his return, Botvinnik suggested a match with Samuel Reshevsky in order to strengthen his claim for a title match with Alekhine, but this received no political support. In December 1943, he won the Moscow Championship, ahead of Smyslov. At the same time, opposition to his plan for a match with Alekhine re-surfaced, on the grounds that Alekhine was a political enemy and the only proper course was to demand that he be stripped of the title. The dispute ended in Botvinnik's favor, and in the dismissal of a senior chess official, one of those to have opposed Botvinnik's plan, who was also a KGB colonel.

Botvinnik speaks (1946).

After Botvinnik won the 1944 and 1945 Soviet championships, most top Soviet players supported his desire for a World Championship match with Alekhine. However, the allegations that Alekhine had written anti-Semitic articles while in Nazi-occupied France made it difficult to host the match in the USSR. Botvinnik opened negotiations with the British Chess Federation to host the match in England, but these were cut short by Alekhine's death in 1946.

When the Second World War ended, Botvinnik won the first high-level post-war tournament, at Groningen in 1946, with 14½ points from nineteen games, ½ point ahead of former World Champion Max Euwe and two ahead of Smyslov. He and Euwe both struggled in the last few rounds, and Botvinnik had a narrow escape against Euwe, who he acknowledged had always been a difficult opponent for him. This was Botvinnik's first outright victory in a tournament outside the Soviet Union.

Botvinnik also won the very strong Mikhail Chigorin Memorial tournament held at Moscow 1947.

== World Champion ==
Botvinnik strongly influenced the design of the system which would be used for World Championship competition from 1948 to 1963. Viktor Baturinsky wrote: "Now came Botvinnik's turn to defend his title in accordance with the new qualifying system which he himself had outlined in 1946." (This statement referred to Botvinnik's 1951 title defence.)

On the basis of his strong results during and just after World War II, Botvinnik was one of five players to contest the 1948 World Chess Championship, which was held at The Hague and Moscow. He won the 1948 tournament convincingly—with a score of 14/20, three points clear—becoming the sixth World Champion. While he was on vacation in Riga after the tournament, an eleven-year-old boy called Mikhail Tal paid a visit, hoping to play a game against the new champion. Tal was met by Botvinnik's wife, who said the champion was asleep, and that she had made him take a rest from chess. In 1950, Botvinnik was one of the inaugural recipients of the international grandmaster title from FIDE.

Botvinnik held the world title, with two brief interruptions, for the next fifteen years, during which he played seven world championship matches. In 1951, he drew with David Bronstein over 24 games in Moscow, +5−5=14, keeping the world title, but it was a struggle for Botvinnik, who won the second-last game and drew the last in order to tie the match. In 1954, he drew with Vasily Smyslov over 24 games in Moscow, +7−7=10, again retaining the title. In 1957, he lost to Smyslov by 9½–12½ in Moscow, but the rules then in force allowed him a rematch without having to go through the Candidates' Tournament, and in 1958 he won the rematch in Moscow; Smyslov said his health was poor during the return match. In 1960, Botvinnik was convincingly beaten 8½–12½ at Moscow by Tal, now 23 years old, but again exercised his right to a rematch in 1961, and won by 13–8 in Moscow. Commentators agreed that Tal's play was weaker in the rematch, probably due to his health, but also that Botvinnik's play was better than in the 1960 match, largely due to thorough preparation. Botvinnik changed his style in the rematch, avoiding the tactical complications in which Tal excelled and aiming for closed positions and endgames, where Tal's technique was not outstanding. Finally, in 1963, he lost the title to Tigran Petrosian, by 9½–12½ in Moscow. FIDE had by then altered the rules, and he was not allowed a rematch. The rematch rule had been nicknamed the "Botvinnik rule" because he twice benefited from it.

Though ranking as formal World Champion, Botvinnik had a relatively poor playing record in the early 1950s: he played no formal competitive games after winning the 1948 match tournament until he defended his title, then struggled to draw his 1951 championship match with Bronstein, placed only fifth in the 1951 Soviet Championship, and tied for third in the 1952 Géza Maróczy Memorial tournament in Budapest; and he had also performed poorly in Soviet training contests. However, he lost only five of over thirty games in the two tournaments; three of the four who finished ahead of him in the 1951 championship were future world champions Smyslov and Petrosian and a leading world championship contender (and winner in both tournaments) Paul Keres; and he finished ahead of Petrosian and even with Smyslov in 1952. Botvinnik did not play in the Soviet team that won the 1952 Chess Olympiad in Helsinki: the players voted for the line-up and placed Botvinnik on second board, with Keres on top board; Botvinnik protested and refused to play. Keres' playing record from 1950 to early 1952 had been outstanding.

Botvinnik won the 1952 Soviet Championship (joint first with Mark Taimanov in the tournament, won the play-off match). He included several wins from that tournament over the 1952 Soviet team members in his book Botvinnik's Best Games 1947–1970, writing "these games had a definite significance for me". In 1956, he tied for first place with Smyslov in the 1956 Alexander Alekhine Memorial in Moscow, despite a last-round loss to Keres.

== Team tournaments ==
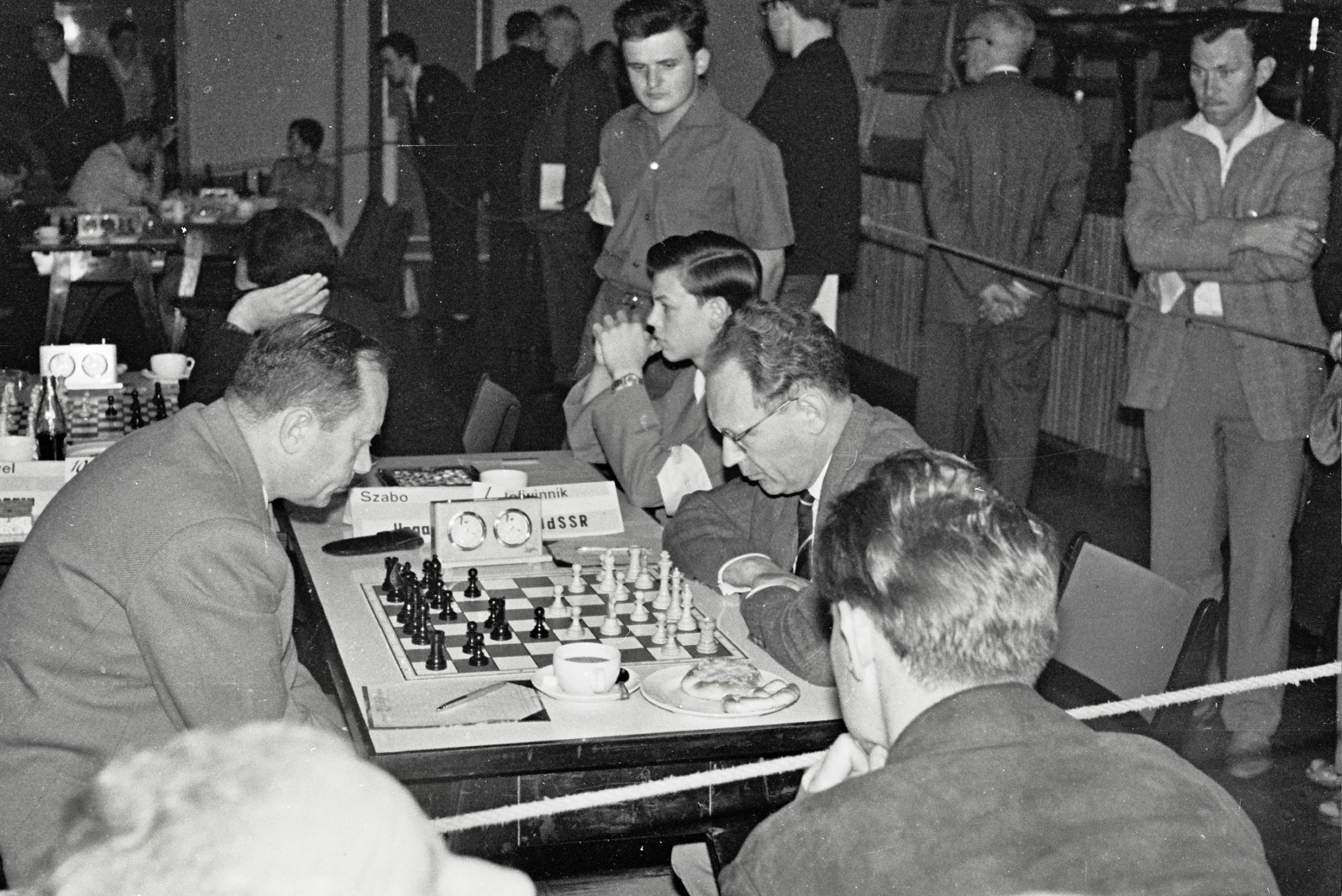
Botvinnik (right) vs. Szabo, Oberhausen 1961

Botvinnik was selected for the Soviet Olympiad team from 1954 to 1964 inclusively, and helped his team to gold medal finishes each of those six times. At Amsterdam 1954 he was on board one and won the gold medal with 8½/11. Then at home for Moscow 1956, he was again board one, and scored 9½/13 for the bronze medal. For Munich 1958, he scored 9/12 for the silver medal on board one. At Leipzig 1960, he played board two behind Mikhail Tal, having lost his title to Tal earlier that year, but he won the board two gold medal with 10½/13. He was back on board one for Varna 1962, scored 8/12, but failed to win a medal for the only time at an Olympiad. His final Olympiad was Tel Aviv 1964, where he won the bronze with 9/12, playing board 2 as he had lost his title to Petrosian. Overall, in six Olympiads, he scored 54½/73 for an outstanding 74.6 percent.

Botvinnik also played twice for the USSR in the European Team Championship. At Oberhausen 1961, he scored 6/9 for the gold medal on board one. But at Hamburg 1965, he struggled on board two with only 3½/8. Both times the Soviet Union won the team gold medals. Botvinnik played one of the final events of his career at the Russia (USSR) vs Rest of the World match in Belgrade 1970, scoring 2½/4 against Milan Matulović, as the USSR narrowly triumphed.

== Late career ==
After losing the world title for the final time, to Tigran Petrosian in Moscow in 1963, Botvinnik withdrew from the following World Championship cycle after FIDE declined, at its annual congress in 1965, to grant a losing champion the automatic right to a rematch. He remained involved with competitive chess, appearing in several highly rated tournaments and continuing to produce memorable games.

Botvinnik retired from competitive play in 1970, aged 59, preferring instead to occupy himself with the development of computer chess programs and to assist with the training of younger Soviet players, earning him the nickname of "Patriarch of the Soviet Chess School" (see below).

Botvinnik's autobiography, K Dostizheniyu Tseli, was published in Russian in 1978, and in English translation as Achieving the Aim (ISBN 0-08-024120-4) in 1981. A staunch Communist, he was noticeably shaken by the collapse of the Soviet Union and lost some of his standing in Russian chess during the Boris Yeltsin era.

In the 1980s, Botvinnik proposed a computer program to manage the Soviet economy. However, his proposals did not receive significant attention from the Soviet government.

During the last few years of his life, Botvinnik personally financed his economic computer project that he hoped would be used to manage the Russian economy. He kept actively working on the program until his death and financing the work from the money he made for the lectures and seminars he attended, despite prominent health problems.

Botvinnik died of pancreatic cancer in May 1995. According to his daughter, Botvinnik remained active until the last few months of his life, and continued to go to work until March 1995 despite blindness in one of his eyes (and extremely poor vision in the other). He died in his Moscow apartment on Frunzenskaya Embankment. His nephew recalled that Botvinnik “died fully conscious, with the greatest courage and dignity, and on the eve of his death gave his relatives detailed instructions on how the funeral should be organized.” For this reason, no memorial service was held, and among prominent chess players only Smyslov attended the funeral. In accordance with Botvinnik’s will, his body was cremated, and the urn was interred in the columbarium of Novodevichy Cemetery next to the burial place of his wife, the ballerina Gayane Davidovna Ananova.

== Political controversies ==
The Soviet Union regarded chess as a symbol of Communist superiority, and hence the Soviet chess league was extremely politicized. As Botvinnik was the first world-class player produced by the Soviet Union, everything he said or did (or did not say or do) had political repercussions, and there were rumors that Soviet opponents were given hints that they should not beat him.

David Bronstein wrote that Boris Verlinsky had won the 1929 Soviet Championship and was granted the first Soviet Grandmaster title for this achievement, yet he was later stripped of it, when it was thought more politically correct to make Botvinnik the first official Soviet GM (as distinct from the then-nonexistent FIDE grandmaster title).

Botvinnik wrote that before the last round of the 1935 Moscow tournament, Soviet Commissar of Justice Nikolai Krylenko, who was also in charge of Soviet chess, proposed that Ilya Rabinovich should deliberately lose to Botvinnik, to ensure that Botvinnik took first place. Botvinnik refused, saying "... then I will myself put a piece en prise and resign". The game was drawn, and Botvinnik shared first place with Salo Flohr.

Botvinnik sent an effusive telegram of thanks to Joseph Stalin after his victory at the great tournament in Nottingham in 1936.

Botvinnik played relatively poorly in the very strong 1940 Soviet Championship, finishing in a tie for fifth/sixth places, with 11½/19, two full points behind Igor Bondarevsky and Andor Lilienthal. With World War II under way by this time, and the strong possibility of little or no chess practice for some time in the future, Botvinnik seems to have prevailed upon the Soviet chess leadership to hold another tournament "in order to clarify the situation". This wound up being the 1941 Absolute Championship of the USSR, which featured the top six finishers from the 1940 event, playing each other four times. After a personal appeal to the defence minister, Vyacheslav Molotov, Botvinnik was exempted from war work for three days a week in order to concentrate on chess preparations. He won this tournament convincingly, and thus reclaimed his position as the USSR's top player.

Bronstein claimed that at the end of the 1946 Groningen tournament, a few months after the death of reigning world champion Alexander Alekhine, Botvinnik personally invited Samuel Reshevsky, Reuben Fine, Max Euwe, Vasily Smyslov, and Paul Keres to join him in a tournament to decide the new world champion, but other evidence suggests that FIDE (the "governing body" of chess), had already proposed a World Championship tournament before the Groningen tournament began, and at this stage the Soviet Union was not a member and therefore took no part in framing that proposal.

Since Keres lost his first four games against Botvinnik in the 1948 World Championship tournament, winning only in the final cycle after the outcome of the tournament had been decided, suspicions have sometimes been raised that Keres was forced to "throw" games to allow Botvinnik to win the Championship. Chess historian Taylor Kingston investigated all the available evidence and arguments, and concluded that: Soviet chess officials gave Keres strong hints that he should not hinder Botvinnik's attempt to win the World Championship; Botvinnik only discovered this about half-way through the tournament and protested so strongly that he angered Soviet officials; Keres probably did not deliberately lose games to Botvinnik or anyone else in the tournament.

Bronstein insinuated that Soviet officials pressured him to lose in the 1951 world championship match so that Botvinnik would keep the title, but comments by Botvinnik's second, Salo Flohr, and Botvinnik's own annotations to the critical 23rd game indicate that Botvinnik knew of no such plot.

In 1956, FIDE changed the world championship rules so that a defeated champion would have the right to a return match. Yuri Averbakh alleged that this was done at the urging of the two Soviet representatives in FIDE, who were personal friends of Botvinnik. Averbakh also claims that Botvinnik's friends were behind FIDE's decision in 1956 to limit the number of players from the same country that could compete in the Candidates Tournament, and that this was to Botvinnik's advantage as it reduced the number of Soviet players he might have to meet in the title match.

Botvinnik asked to be allowed to play in the 1956 Candidates Tournament, as he wanted to use the event as part of his warm-up for the next year's title match, but his request was refused.

Mikhail Tal's chronic kidney problems contributed to his defeat in his 1961 return match with Botvinnik, and his doctors in Riga advised that he should postpone the match for health reasons. Averbakh claimed that Botvinnik would agree to a postponement only if Tal was certified unfit by Moscow doctors, and that Tal then decided to play. The 1961 world championship lasted 21 games and Botvinnik won ten of them, for a total score of +10−5=6, reclaiming the title he had lost a year earlier and becoming the oldest winner of a FIDE world championship match at 50.

In 1963, Botvinnik played his last world championship match against Tigran Petrosian, in a 22-game series. Petrosian, almost 20 years younger, wore out the 52 year old Botvinnik in a series of protracted games, most of them over 40 moves, including six consecutive draws. The defending champion played poorly in games 18 and 19, and the match ended with three short draws. Petrosian thus claimed the world championship with a score of +5−2=15.

In 1954, he wrote an article about inciting socialist revolution in western countries, aiming to spread communism without a third world war. And in 1960 Botvinnik wrote a letter to the Soviet Government proposing economic reforms that were contrary to party policy.

In 1976, Soviet grandmasters were asked to sign a letter condemning Viktor Korchnoi as a "traitor" after Korchnoi defected. Botvinnik evaded this "request" by saying that he wanted to write his own letter denouncing Korchnoi. By this time, however, his importance had waned and officials would not give him this "privilege", so Botvinnik's name did not appear on the group letter – an outcome Botvinnik may have foreseen. Bronstein and Boris Spassky openly refused to sign the letter.

== Assessment ==
=== Playing strength and style ===
Reuben Fine, writing in 1976, observed that Botvinnik was at or near the top of the chess world for thirty years—from 1933, when he drew a match against Flohr, to 1963, when he lost the world championship for the final time, to Petrosian—"a feat equaled historically only by Emanuel Lasker and Wilhelm Steinitz". The statistical rating system used in Raymond Keene and Nathan Divinsky's book Warriors of the Mind concludes that Botvinnik was the fourth strongest player of all time: behind Garry Kasparov, Anatoly Karpov and Bobby Fischer but ahead of José Raúl Capablanca, Lasker, Viktor Korchnoi, Boris Spassky, Vasily Smyslov and Tigran Petrosian. The Chessmetrics system is sensitive to the length of the periods being compared but places Botvinnik third in a comparison of players' best individual years (1946 for Botvinnik) and sixth in a comparison of fifteen-year periods (1935–1949 in Botvinnik's case). In 2005, Chessmetrics' creator Jeff Sonas wrote an article which examined various ways of comparing the strength of "world number one" players, some not based on Chessmetrics; and Botvinnik generally emerged as one of the top six (the greatest exceptions were in criteria related to tournament results). FIDE did not adopt the Elo rating system until 1970, by which time Botvinnik's strength had been declining for several years. According to unofficial calculations by Arpad Elo, Botvinnik was the highest-rated player from 1937 to 1954, peaking about 2730 in 1946.

This may seem surprising in the light of Botvinnik's results in the 1950s and early 1960s, when he failed to win a world championship match outright (as reigning champion) and his tournament results were patchy. But after the FIDE world championship cycle was established in 1948, reigning champions had to play the strongest contender every three years, and successful title defenses became less common than in the pre-World War II years, when the titleholder could select his challenger. Despite this, Botvinnik held the world title for a longer period than any of his successors except Garry Kasparov. Botvinnik also became world champion at the relatively late age of 37, because World War II brought international competition to a virtual halt for six years; and he was 52 years old when he finally lost his title (only Wilhelm Steinitz and Emanuel Lasker were older when they were defeated). Botvinnik's best years were from 1935 to 1946; during that period he dominated Soviet chess; and the USSR's 15½–4½ win in the 1945 radio match against the US proved that the USSR's top players were considerably better than those from the US (who had dominated international team competitions in the 1930s).

Stolberg vs. Botvinnik,
USSR Ch. 1940

Position: h1 white king, d1 white rook, c1 white queen, g2 white pawn, e2 black rook, d2 white bishop, b2 white knight, a2 white rook, h3 white pawn, b3 black rook, f5 white pawn, e5 black knight, d5 black pawn, b5 black queen, a5 white pawn, f6 black pawn, b6 white pawn, a6 black pawn, g7 black pawn, b7 black pawn, g8 black king, f8 black bishop

Black to move
After tying up White's pieces on the queenside, Botvinnik won with a sudden kingside attack: 1...Rxh3+ 2.gxh3 d4 and White resigned, as he could not stop ...Qd5 and mate next move.

Botvinnik generally sought tense positions with chances for both sides; hence his results were often better with the Black pieces as he could avoid lines that were likely to produce draws. He had a strong grasp of long-term strategy, and was often willing to accept weaknesses that his opponent could not exploit in exchange for some advantage that he could exploit. He confessed that he was relatively weak in tactical calculation, yet many of his games feature sacrifices – often long-term positional sacrifices whose purpose was not to force an immediate win, but to improve his position and undermine his opponent's. Botvinnik was also capable of all-out sacrificial attacks when he thought the position justified it. Botvinnik saw himself as a "universal player" (all-rounder), in contrast to an all-out attacker like Mikhail Tal or a defender like Tigran Petrosian. Reuben Fine considered Botvinnik's collection of best games one of the three most beautiful up to the mid-1950s (the other two were Alexander Alekhine's and Akiba Rubinstein's).

Kasparov quotes Tigran Petrosian as saying, "There was a very unpleasant feeling of inevitability. Once in a conversation with Keres I mentioned this and even compared Botvinnik with a bulldozer, which sweeps away everything in its path. Keres smiled and said: 'But can you imagine what it was like to play him when he was young?'"

=== Influence on the game ===
Botvinnik's example and teaching established the modern approach to preparing for competitive chess: regular but moderate physical exercise; analysing very thoroughly a relatively narrow repertoire of openings; annotating one's own games, those of past great players and those of competitors; publishing one's annotations so that others can point out any errors; studying strong opponents to discover their strengths and weaknesses; ruthless objectivity about one's own strengths and weaknesses. Botvinnik also played many short training matches against strong grandmasters including Salo Flohr, Yuri Averbakh, Viacheslav Ragozin, and Semion Furman – in noisy or smoky rooms if he thought he would have to face such conditions in actual competition. Vladimir Kramnik said, "Botvinnik's chess career was the way of a genius, although he was not a genius", meaning that Botvinnik was brilliant at making the best use of his talents.

Botvinnik used almost exclusively queenside pawn openings with the white pieces. In his eight World Championship matches, he never started a game with an e4-opening, and his usual choices as White were the English Opening or Queen's Gambit. When playing the black pieces, he preferred the French Defense or Sicilian Defense in response to 1.e4, and the Slav Defense or Nimzo-Indian Defence in response to 1.d4. While Botvinnik did not use a wide range of openings, he made major contributions to those he did use, for example: the Botvinnik Variation of the Semi-Slav Defense in the Queen's Gambit Declined, the Kasparov/Botvinnik system in the Exchange Variation of the Queen's Gambit Declined, the Caro–Kann Defence (both the Panov–Botvinnik Attack for White and various approaches for Black), the Winawer Variation of the French Defense, the Botvinnik System in the English Opening. In his openings research Botvinnik did not aim to produce tactical tricks that would only be effective once, but rather systems in which he aimed to understand typical positions and their possibilities better than his rivals. His advice to his pupils included "My theory of the openings fitted into one notebook" and "You don't have to know that which everyone knows, but it is important to know that which not everyone knows." In fact he used different notebooks in different periods, and copied a few analyses from one notebook to the next. The "Soviet School of Chess" that dominated competition from 1945 to about 2000 followed Botvinnik's approach to preparation and to openings research; and, although Soviet players had their own preferred styles of play, they adopted his combative approach and willingness to ignore "classical" principles if doing so offered credible prospects of a lasting advantage.

In 1963, Botvinnik founded his own school within the Soviet coaching system, and its graduates include world champions Anatoly Karpov, Garry Kasparov and Vladimir Kramnik, and other top-class players such as Alexei Shirov, Vladimir Akopian and Jaan Ehlvest. Botvinnik was not an infallible spotter of chess talent: although he said of the 11-year-old Kasparov, "The future of chess lies in the hands of this young man", he said on first seeing Karpov, "The boy doesn't have a clue about chess, and there's no future at all for him in this profession." But Karpov recounts fondly his youthful memories of the Botvinnik school and credits Botvinnik's training, especially the homework he assigned, with a marked improvement in his own play. Kasparov presents Botvinnik almost as a kind of father figure, going some way towards balancing the common public perception of Botvinnik as dour and aloof; and Kasparov inherited Botvinnik's emphasis on preparation, research and innovation. Botvinnik was still playing a major teaching role in his late 70s, when Kramnik entered the school, and made a favorable impression on his pupil.

== Other achievements ==
=== Electrical engineering ===
Engineering was as much of a passion for Botvinnik as chess – at Nottingham in 1936, where he had his first major tournament win outside the USSR, he said "I wish I could do what he's done in electrical engineering" (referring to Milan Vidmar, another grandmaster). He was awarded the Order of the Badge of Honour for his work on power stations in the Urals during World War II (while he was also establishing himself as the world's strongest chess player). He earned his doctorate in electrical engineering in 1951. In 1956, he joined the Research Institute for Electrical Energy as a senior research scientist. In 1960 he published a book on Asynchronized Synchronous Machines

=== Computer chess ===
In the 1950s Botvinnik became interested in computers, at first mainly for playing computer chess but he later also co-authored reports on the possible use of artificial intelligence in managing the Soviet economy. Botvinnik's research on chess-playing programs concentrated on "selective searches", which used general chess principles to decide which moves were worth considering. This was the only feasible approach for the primitive computers available in the Soviet Union in the early 1960s, which were only capable of searching three or four half-moves deep (i.e. A's move, B's move, A's move, B's move) if they tried to examine every variation. Botvinnik eventually developed an algorithm that was reasonably good at finding the right move in difficult positions, but it often missed the right move in simple positions, e.g. where it was possible to checkmate in two moves. This "selective" approach turned out to be a dead end, as computers were powerful enough by the mid-1970s to perform a brute-force search (checking all possible moves) several moves deep and today's vastly more powerful computers do this well enough to beat human world champions. However, his PIONEER program contained a generalized method of decision-making that, with a few adjustments, enabled it to plan maintenance of power stations all over the USSR. On September 7, 1991, Botvinnik was awarded an honorary degree in mathematics of the University of Ferrara (Italy) for his work on computer chess.

== Writings ==
=== Chess ===
- Botvinnik, M.M. (1960). One Hundred Selected Games. Courier Dover. ISBN 0-486-20620-3.
- Botvinnik, M.M. (1972). Cafferty, B. (ed.). Botvinnik's best games, 1947–1970. Batsford. ISBN 0-7134-0357-8.
- Botvinnik, M.M. (1973). Garry, S. (ed.). Soviet chess championship, 1941: Complete text of games with detailed notes & an introduction. Dover Publications. ISBN 0-486-22184-9.
- Botvinnik, M.M. (1973). World Championship: The Return Match Botvinnik vs. Smyslov 1958. Chess Digest Magazine.
- Botvinnik, M.M. (1973). Alekhine vs. Euwe return match 1937. Chess Digest.
- Matanovic, A.; Kazic, B.; Yudovich, M.; Botvinnik, M.M. (1974). Candidates' matches 1974. Centar Za Unapredivanje Saha.
- Botvinnik, M.M. (1978). Anatoly Karpov: His Road to the World Championship. Elsevier. ISBN 0-08-021139-9.
- Botvinnik, M.M.; Estrin, Y. (1980). The Gruenfeld Defense. Rhm Pr. ISBN 0-89058-017-0.
- Botvinnik, M.M. (1981). Achieving the Aim. Translated by Cafferty, B. Pergamon Press. ISBN 0-08-024120-4.
- Botvinnik, M.M. (1981). Selected Games: 1967–1970. Pergamon. ISBN 0-08-024123-9.
- Botvinnik, M.M. (1982). Marfia, J. (ed.). Fifteen Games and Their Stories. Coraopolis, Pennsylvania, U.S.A: Chess Enterprises. ISBN 0-931462-15-0.
- Botvinnik, M.M. (1985). Botvinnik on the Endgame. Chess Enterprises. ISBN 0-931462-43-6.
- Botvinnik, M.M. (1996). Neat, K.; Stauss, E. (eds.). Half a Century of Chess. Cadogan Books. ISBN 1-85744-122-2.
- Botvinnik, M.M. (2000). Neat, K. (ed.). Botvinnik's Best Games Volume 1: 1925–1941. Moravian Chess. ISBN 978-80-7189-317-2.
- Botvinnik, M.M. (2000). Neat, K. (ed.). Botvinnik's Best Games Volume 2: 1942–1956. Moravian Chess. ISBN 80-7189-370-6.
- Botvinnik, M.M. (2000). Neat, K. (ed.). Botvinnik's Best Games Volume 3: 1957–1970 – Analytical & Critical Works. Moravian Chess. ISBN 80-7189-405-2.
- Botvinnik, M.M. (2002). Championship Chess : Match Tournament for the Absolute Chess Championship of the USSR, Leningrad-Moscow 1941. Hardinge Simpole. ISBN 978-1-84382-012-3.
- Botvinnik, M.M. (2004). Match for the World Chess Championship Mikhail Botvinnik-David Bronstein Moscow 1951. Edition Olms. ISBN 3-283-00459-5.
- Botvinnik, M.M. (2004). Botvinnik, I. (ed.). World Championship Return Match: Botvinnik V. Tal, Moscow 1961. Olms. ISBN 978-3-283-00461-3.

=== Computers ===
- Botvinnik, M.M. (1970). Computers, Chess and Long-Range Planning. Springer Verlag. ISBN 0-387-90012-8.
- Botvinnik, M.M. (1984). Computers in Chess: Solving Inexact Search Problems. Springer-Verlag. ISBN 0-387-90869-2.

== Tournament results ==
The following table gives Botvinnik's placings and scores in tournaments. The first "Score" column gives the number of points on the total possible. In the second "Score" column, "+" indicates the number of won games, "−" the number of losses, and "=" the number of draws.

Date	Location	Tournament	Placing	Score		Notes
1923	Leningrad	School championship	—	—	—	Botvinnik estimates "about 10th out of 16".
1924	Leningrad	School championship	1st	5/6	+5−1=0	
1924	Leningrad	non-category	1st	11½/13	+11−1=1	
1924	Leningrad	2B and 3rd Categories	1st	11½/13	+11−1=1	
1924	Leningrad	2A Category	—	—	—	Tournament unfinished
1925	Leningrad	2A and 1B Categories	1st	10/11	+10−1=0	
1925	Leningrad	1st Category	3rd	7½/11	+7−3=1	
1925	Leningrad	1st Category	—	—	—	Tournament unfinished
1926	Leningrad	Leningrad Championship, Semi-finals	1st	11½/12	+11−0=1	
1926	Leningrad	Leningrad Championship	2nd=	7/9	+6−1=2	
1926	Leningrad	Northwest Provincial Championship, Semi-finals	2nd=	9/11	+8−1=2	
1926	Leningrad	Northwest Provincial Championship	3rd	6½/10	+4−1=5	
1927	Leningrad	Tournament of "Six"	2nd	7½/10	+6−1=3	
1927	Moscow	5th USSR Chess Championship	5th=	12½/20	+9−4=7	
1928	Leningrad	Regional Metalworkers' Committee Championship	1st	8½/11	+7−1=3	
1929	Leningrad	Regional Committee of Educational Workers' Championship	1st	11½/14	+9−0=5	
1929	Odessa	6th USSR Chess Championship, Quarter-finals	1st	7/8	+6−0=2	
1929	Odessa	6th USSR Chess Championship, Semi-finals	3rd=	2½/5	+2−2=1	
1930	Leningrad	Masters' Tournament	1st	6½/8	+6−1=1	
1931	Leningrad	Leningrad Championship	1st	14/17	+12−1=4	
1931	Moscow	7th USSR Chess Championship, Semi-finals	2nd	6½/9	+6−2=1	
1931	Moscow	7th USSR Chess Championship	1st	13½/17	+12−2=3	
1932	Leningrad	Leningrad Championship	1st	10/11	+9−0=2	
1932	Leningrad	Masters' Tournament in House of Scientists	1st	7/10	+6−2=2	
1933	Leningrad	Masters' Tournament	1st=	10/13	+7−0=6	
1933	Leningrad	8th USSR Chess Championship	1st	14/19	+11−2=6	
1934	Leningrad	Tournament including Euwe and Kmoch	1st	7½/11	+5−1=5	
1934	Hastings	Hastings International Chess Congress	5th=	5/9	+3−2=4	
1935	Moscow	2nd International Tournament	1st=	13/19	+9−2=8	
1936	Moscow	3rd International Tournament	2nd	12/18	+7−1=10	
1936	Nottingham	International Tournament	1st=	10/14	+6−0=8	
1938	Leningrad	11th USSR Chess Championship, Semi-finals	1st	14/17	+12−1=4	
1938	Amsterdam, etc.	AVRO tournament	3rd	7½/14	+3−2=9	
1939	Leningrad	11th USSR Chess Championship	1st	12½/17	+8−0=9	
1940	Moscow	12th USSR Chess Championship	5th=	11½/19	+8−4=7	
1941	Leningrad, Moscow	Absolute Chess Championship of the USSR	1st	13½/20	+9−2=9	
1943	Sverdlovsk	Masters' Tournament	1st	10½/14	+7−0=7	
1943	Moscow	Moscow Championship	1st	13½/16	+12−1=3	
1944	Moscow	13th USSR Chess Championship	1st	12½/16	+11−2=3	
1945	Moscow	14th USSR Chess Championship	1st	15/17	+13−0=4	
1946	Groningen	International Tournament	1st	14½/19	+13−3=3	
1947	Moscow	Tchigorin Memorial Tournament	1st	11/15	+8−1=6	
1948	The Hague, Moscow	World Chess Championship Tournament	1st	14/20	+10−2=8	
1951	Moscow	19th USSR Chess Championship	5th	10/17	+6−3=8	
1952	Budapest	Maroczy Jubilee	3rd=	11/17	+7−2=8	
1952	Moscow	20th USSR Chess Championship	1st=	13½/19	+9−1=9	Defeated Taimanov in a play-off for first place.
1955	Moscow	22nd USSR Chess Championship	3rd=	11½/19	+7−3=9	
1956	Moscow	Alekhine Memorial	1st=	11/15	+8−1=6	
1958	Wageningen	International Tournament	1st	4/5	+3−0=2	
1961/2	Hastings	International Chess Congress (Premier)	1st	8/9	+7−0=2	
1962	Stockholm	International Tournament	1st	8½/9	+8−0=1	
1965	Noordwijk	International Tournament	1st	6/7	+5−0=2	
1966	Amsterdam	IBM Tournament	1st	7½/9	+7−1=1	
1966/7	Hastings	International Chess Congress (Premier)	1st	6½/9	+5−1=3	
1967	Palma de Mallorca	International Tournament	2nd=	12½/17	+9−1=7	
1968	Monte Carlo	International Tournament	2nd	9/13	+5−0=8	
1969	Wijk aan Zee	Hoogovens (Grandmaster Section)	1st=	10½/15	+6−0=9	
1969	Belgrade	International Tournament	7th	8½/15	+5−3=7	
1970	Leiden	Quadrangular Tournament	3rd=	5½/12	+1−2=9	Four players. Each opponent was played four times.

=== Match results ===
Here are Botvinnik's results in matches. In the second "Score" column, "+" indicates the number of won games, "−" the number of losses, and "=" the number of draws.

Date	Opponent	Result	Location	Score		Notes
1933	Salo Flohr	Tied	Moscow, Leningrad	6/12	+2−2=8	Challenge
1937	Grigory Levenfish	Tied	Moscow, Leningrad	6½/13	+5−5=3	Challenge
1940	Viacheslav Ragozin	Won	Moscow, Leningrad	8½/12	+5−0=7	Training
1951	David Bronstein	Tied	Moscow	12/24	+5−5=14	World title
1952	Mark Taimanov	Won	Moscow	3½/6	+1−0=5	USSR Ch playoff
1954	Vasily Smyslov	Tied	Moscow	12/24	+7−7=10	World title
1957	Vasily Smyslov	Lost	Moscow	9½/22	+3−6=13	World title
1958	Vasily Smyslov	Won	Moscow	12½/23	+7−5=11	Rematch
1960	Mikhail Tal	Lost	Moscow	8½/21	+2−6=13	World title
1961	Mikhail Tal	Won	Moscow	13/21	+10−5=6	Rematch
1963	Tigran Petrosian	Lost	Moscow	9½/21	+2−5=14	World title

== Notable games ==
- Botvinnik vs. Chekhover, Moscow 1935, Réti Opening, 1–0
- Botvinnik vs. Capablanca, AVRO 1938, Nimzoindian Defense, 1–0 At first sight Botvinnik's opening play looks unpromising, but he knew how his attack would develop.
- Keres vs. Botvinnik, USSR Absolute Championship 1941, Nimzoindian Defense, 0–1 Playing as Black, Botvinnik demolishes a world title contender in 22 moves.
- Tolush vs. Botvinnik, USSR Championship 1944, 0–1 Long-term positional sacrifices.
- Denker vs. Botvinnik, US vs USSR radio match 1945, 0–1 Botvinnik uses the Botvinnik System in the Semi-Slav Defense to bulldoze US champion Arnold Denker.
- Botvinnik vs. Keres, Alekhine Memorial Tournament Moscow 1966, 1–0 Botvinnik shows his superior understanding of closed positions, and when to open them.
- Botvinnik vs Portisch, Monaco 1968, 1–0 A fireworks display starting with an exchange sacrifice on the c-file, a tactic on which Botvinnik wrote the book.

== See also ==
- List of Jewish chess players

Achievements
Vacant Interregnum of World Chess Champions Title last held by Alexander Alekhine	World Chess Champion; 1948–1957	Succeeded by Vasily Smyslov
Preceded by Vasily Smyslov	World Chess Champion; 1958–1960	Succeeded by Mikhail Tal
Preceded by Mikhail Tal	World Chess Champion; 1961–1963	Succeeded by Tigran Petrosian
