= Andor Lilienthal =

Soviet-Hungarian chess grandmaster (1911–2010)

Personal information
- Born: Andor Arnoldovich Lilienthal; 5 May 1911 Moscow, Russian Empire
- Died: 8 May 2010 (aged 99) Budapest, Hungary

Chess career
- Country: Hungary; Soviet Union (1939–1965)
- Title: Grandmaster (1950)
- Peak rating: 2450 (July 1971)

Andor (André, Andre, Andrei) Arnoldovich Lilienthal (5 May 1911 – 8 May 2010) was a Hungarian and Soviet chess player. In his long career, he played against ten male and female world champions, beating Emanuel Lasker, José Raúl Capablanca, Alexander Alekhine, Max Euwe, Mikhail Botvinnik, Vasily Smyslov, and Vera Menchik.

At the time of his death, he was the oldest living grandmaster (since surpassed by Juraj Nikolac), and the last surviving person from the original group of grandmasters awarded the title by FIDE in 1950.

== Biography ==
Lilienthal, of Jewish origin, was born in Moscow, Russian Empire, and moved to Hungary at the age of two. He played for Hungary in three Chess Olympiads: Folkestone 1933 (scoring +7−0=6 as the reserve, the fifth player on the team), Warsaw 1935 (scoring +11−0=8 on second board), and Stockholm 1937 (scoring +9−2=6 on first board, leading his team to the silver medal). He won the individual gold medal for his board (reserve and second board, respectively) at the 1933 and 1935 Olympiads, and had the fourth-best result on first board in 1937. His total score in the Olympiads was 75.51%.

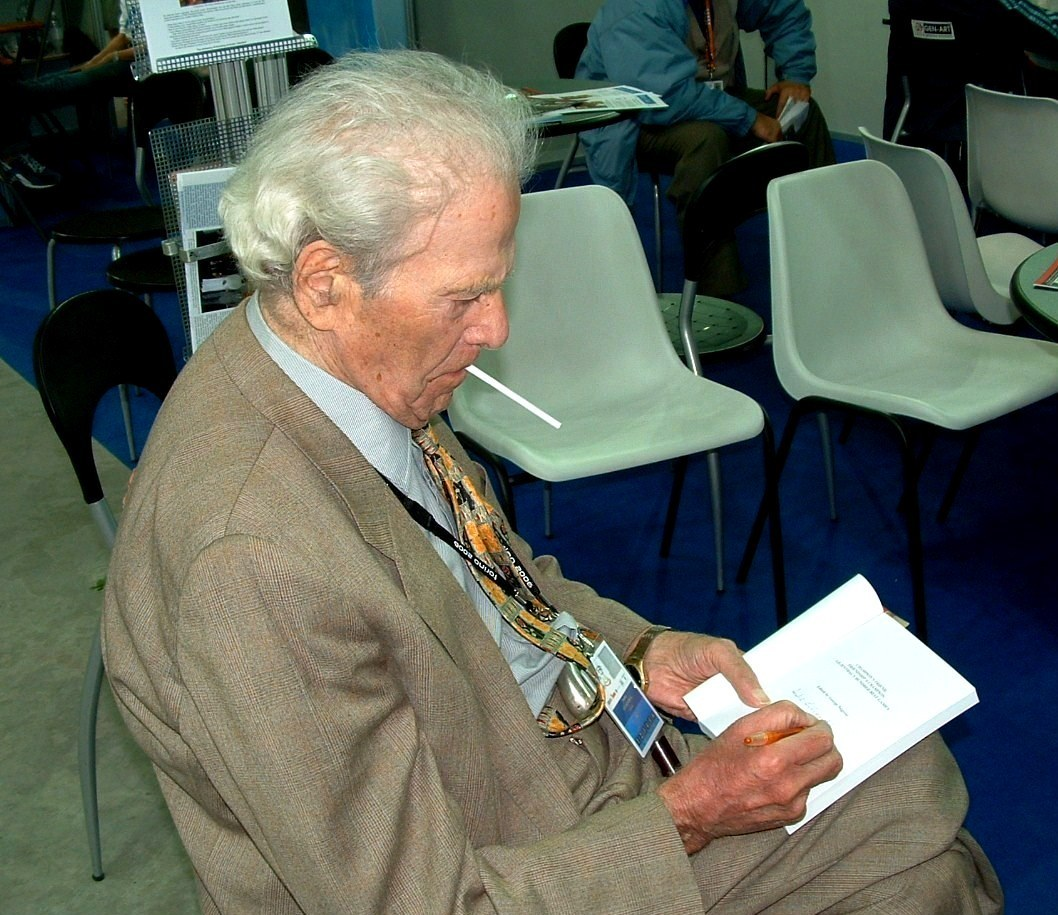
Lilienthal at the Turin 2006 Olympiad

Emigrating to the Soviet Union in 1935, Lilienthal became a Soviet citizen in 1939. He played in the USSR Chess Championship eight times. His best result came in the 1940 championship, when he tied for first with Igor Bondarevsky, ahead of Smyslov, Paul Keres, Isaac Boleslavsky, Botvinnik, and 14 other players. He qualified for the Candidates Tournament once, in 1948.

From 1951 until 1960 he was Tigran Petrosian's trainer. Lilienthal began a friendship with Vasily Smyslov in 1938, and was Smyslov's second in his world championship matches against Botvinnik. He retired from tournament play in 1965 and returned to Hungary in 1976. His last tournament was Zamárdi 1980, where he finished sixth in the B group, scoring +3−1=11.

Lilienthal remained actively involved in the chess world into his ninth decade. He died on 8 May 2010, at the age of 99. It was reported that he had been ill for some time. At the time of his death, he was the oldest living grandmaster.

According to Boris Spassky, Bobby Fischer approved only three chess players who could carry his coffin at his funeral: Andor Lilienthal, Lajos Portisch, and Boris Spassky.

== Notable games ==
Lilienthal was one of the few players with an even record against Capablanca. Lilienthal's "most celebrated victory" is his win commanding the white pieces against Capablanca at Hastings 1934–35:

Lilienthal vs. Capablanca

Position: c8 black rook, e8 black king, h8 black rook, c7 black pawn, d7 black knight, f7 black pawn, g7 black pawn, b6 black pawn, f6 black knight, h6 black pawn, a5 black pawn, e5 white pawn, f5 white pawn, c4 black queen, e4 white pawn, h4 white bishop, a3 white pawn, c3 white pawn, c2 white queen, e2 white knight, g2 white pawn, h2 white pawn, a1 white rook, f1 white rook, g1 white king

Position after 19.dxe5
1. d4 Nf6 2. c4 e6 3. Nc3 Bb4 4. a3 Bxc3+ 5. bxc3 b6 6. f3 d5 7. Bg5 h6 8. Bh4 Ba6 9. e4 Offering a pawn sacrifice introduced by Alexander Alekhine–Erich Eliskases, Hastings 1933–34. 9... Bxc4 9...dxe4 10.fxe4 g5 11.Bg3 Nxe4 12.Be5, followed by Qc2 or Bd3, gives White an attack. 10. Bxc4 dxc4 11. Qa4+ Qd7 12. Qxc4 Qc6 Eliskases got a satisfactory game after 12...Nc6. 13. Qd3 Nbd7 14. Ne2 Rd8 15. 0-0 a5 16. Qc2 Qc4 17. f4 Rc8 18. f5 e5 19. dxe5 (diagram) Qxe4? Lilienthal analyzes 19...Qc5+ 20.Bf2! Qxe5 21.Bd4 Qxe4 22.Qxe4 Nxe4 23.Bxg7 Rh7 24.f6 "and Black's position is hopeless." On 19...Nxe5, White retains the initiative with 20.Nf4, for example 20...Nfd7 21.Rad1 0-0 22.Nd5 threatening 23.Ne7+ or 23.f6. 19...Nxe4 20.Rf4 Qc5+ 21.Kh1 Ng5 22.Bf2 is strong for White. 20. exf6!! A spectacular queen sacrifice. 20... Qxc2 No better is 20...Qxh4 21.fxg7 Rg8 22.f6! followed by Rf4; if 22...Nxf6 23.Qf5 Ke7 and now 24.Rae1 or 24.Qe5+ wins. 21. fxg7 Rg8 22. Nd4 Threatening a murderous check from e1. 22... Qe4 If 22...Qa4, 23.Rae1+ Ne5 24.Rxe5+ Kd7 25.Rd5+ Ke8 26.Re1#. On 22...Qd2, 23.Rae1+ Ne5 24.Rxe5+ Kd7 25.Rd5+ Ke8 26.Re1+ wins. As in the game, Black loses back the queen after 22...Qxc3 23.Rae1+ Ne5 24.Rxe5+ Kd7 25.Re7+ Kd6 26.Nb5+ or 22...Qd3 23.Rae1+ Ne5 24.Rxe5+ Kd7 25.Rd5+. 23. Rae1 Nc5 24. Rxe4+ Nxe4 25. Re1 Rxg7 26. Rxe4+ Kd7 1–0 Seeing that 27.Re7+ Kd6 28.f6 and 29.Bg3+ wins, Capablanca resigned.

The game is famed, and Lilienthal relates, "wherever I went on an exhibition tour, both in the Soviet Union and elsewhere, chess players and fans always asked me to show them how I sacrificed the queen against the great Cuban." When Bobby Fischer noticed Lilienthal in the audience at his 1992 return match against Boris Spassky, Fischer greeted him with the remark "Pawn e5 takes f6."

== See also ==
- List of Jewish chess players
