= Isaac Boleslavsky =

Soviet chess grandmaster and writer (1919–1977)

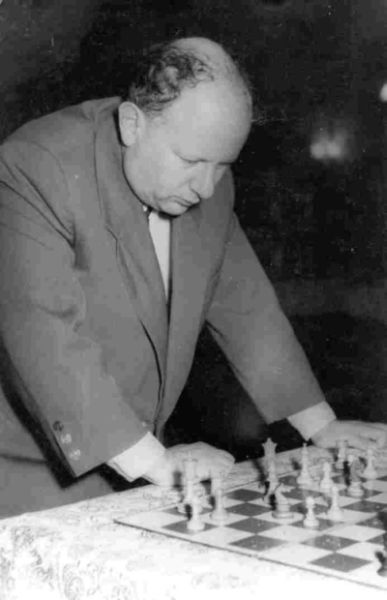

Personal information
- Born: 9 June 1919 Zolotonosha, Ukrainian SSR
- Died: 15 February 1977 (aged 57) Minsk, Byelorussian SSR, Soviet Union

Chess career
- Country: Soviet Union
- Title: Grandmaster (1950)
- Peak rating: 2560 (July 1971)
- Peak ranking: No. 28 (July 1971)

Isaac Yefremovich Boleslavsky (Ukrainian: Ісаак Єфремович Болеславський, Russian: Исаак Ефремович Болеславский; 9 June 1919 – 15 February 1977) was a Soviet chess grandmaster and writer.

== Early career ==
Born in Zolotonosha in Ukraine to Jewish parents, Boleslavsky taught himself chess at age nine. In 1933, he became schoolboy champion of Dnipropetrovsk. Three years later, he won third prize in the 1936 USSR All-Union Junior Championship, held in Leningrad.

In 1938, at nineteen, Boleslavsky won the Ukrainian Championship; the following year, he won the Ukraine SSR championship, qualified to play in the USSR Chess Championship at the age of 20, and gained his national chess master title. He earned a degree in philology at Sverdlovsk University.

In 1940, Boleslavsky played in the 12th USSR championship final in Moscow. He won eight of his last ten games and tied for fifth-sixth place with Mikhail Botvinnik, but lost their personal meeting. Thereafter he sought revenge. Later, Boleslavsky as an ambitious 27-year-old master recalled the plans he had hatched:

I decided that by systematic work on myself I could win. "The devil is not so terrible as he is painted." Losses to Botvinnik in both games in a match tournament in 1941 and in our game in the XIV national championship four years later did not sober me. It seemed to me that I understood Botvinnik's game and saw its strengths and weaknesses. I began to prepare for a meeting with him. I understood, of course, it was a completely different style of player than my style in those years. But I thought I had a chance to win.

At the end of 1940 he won the Ukrainian Championship for the third consecutive year. In March 1941, he took part in the match-tournament for the title of Absolute Champion of the USSR, finishing fourth of six participants. On the eve of the match-tournament, he had to pass an examination at the University, and his preparation for the chess event proved to be inadequate.

In 1945 he took second place in the 14th USSR championship, behind Mikhail Botvinnik. He won nine games, drew six, and lost two. He was awarded the Grandmaster title in the USSR. He made his international debut on the third board of the USSR–US radio match. He drew his first game with Reuben Fine and defeated him in the second game, winning a prize for the best game of the match. Boleslavsky secured a clear advantage in the opening thanks to his superior pawn structure and won without allowing Fine much counterplay. The Soviets regarded Fine as possibly the strongest American player, based on his international results in the pre-World War II era.

In 1946, his daughter Tatiana was born; she later married David Bronstein. Boleslavsky and Bronstein had become friends in the late 1930s, and remained so throughout their lives. In 1946, Boleslavsky played abroad in an international tournament for the first time in Groningen and tied for sixth-seventh place.

In 1950 Boleslavsky was one of the inaugural recipients of the International Grandmaster title from FIDE.

== World Championship Candidate ==
In the 1951 World Championship cycle, Boleslavsky qualified from the first-ever Interzonal at Saltsjöbaden 1948 into the Candidates Tournament two years later in Budapest. In the Candidates tournament—the winner of which would play a World Chess Championship match against Mikhail Botvinnik—he was the only undefeated player, and led for most of the tournament, but in the last round he was caught by Bronstein, who later won a playoff in Moscow that same year (+3−2=9).

This turned out to be Boleslavsky's last chance as a serious contender for the world championship. In 1953, he participated in the Candidates' tournament in Zürich, but finished in 10th–11th places, and never qualified for subsequent world championship cycles.

== Later career ==
In 1951, Boleslavsky was Bronstein's second during his match with Botvinnik for the world championship, which wound up drawn after 24 games. In 1952, he scored 7 out of 8 at the Helsinki Olympiad, helping the Soviet team to the gold medals. This was the only Olympiad he would play in his career, but he attended several others to provide support for the Soviet team.

In 1951 Boleslavsky moved to Minsk and that same year became the champion of this city (he repeated his victory in 1953/54). He won the Belarusian Championship in 1952 (joint) and 1964.

In 1961, he played in his last USSR Championship final. He took first place at an international tournament in Debrecen. He was world champion Tigran Petrosian's assistant from 1963 to 1969.

In 1968 he captained the USSR students' team, which won the World Championship at Ybbs an der Donau. His last tournament appearance was in Minsk in 1971, at age 52. Boleslavsky was the chief trainer of the USSR Chess Federation in the 1960s, and he remained until his death a very well respected analyst and chess writer, particularly in opening theory.

He died in Minsk on February 15, 1977, at the age of 57, after falling on an icy sidewalk, fracturing his hip and contracting a fatal infection while in hospital.

== Legacy ==
One of Boleslavsky's main contributions to opening theory is the Boleslavsky Variation in the Sicilian Defence (1.e4 c5 2.Nf3 d6 3.d4 cxd4 4.Nxd4 Nf6 5.Nc3 Nc6 6.Be2 e5). A feature of the pawn structure in this line called the Boleslavsky hole is named after him.

Boleslavsky, together with fellow Ukrainians Bronstein, Efim Geller, and Alexander Konstantinopolsky, beginning in the late 1930s, turned the King's Indian Defence from a suspect variation into one of the most popular defences today. Hans Kmoch in his book Pawn Power in Chess calls the King's Indian configuration of black pawns on c6 and d6 (especially if the d-pawn is on a semi-open file) "the Boleslavsky Wall".

Lev Polugaevsky said of him:

I am convinced that any player, even the very strongest, can and should learn from his games (especially the Sicilians!). As regards his depth of penetration into the mysteries of the Sicilian Defence, for both sides moreover, it is doubtful if anyone could compare with Boleslavsky. He had a virtuoso feeling for the dynamics of the opening, and always aimed for a complicated and double-edged struggle, although by nature he was one of the most modest grandmasters with whom I have had the pleasure of rubbing shoulders.

One of his friends and disciples, Grandmaster Alexey Suetin, wrote in the magazine Chess in the USSR:

Boleslavsky was a man of exceptional modesty and great culture. If it is difficult to imagine Boleslavsky without chess, it is simply impossible to imagine him without books. He perfectly knew history, classical literature, poetry ... a truly innovative man, proven by his remarkable debut of systems in the Sicilian and King's Indian, his research enriched a number of other current openings. Deep in book, his witty analyses in chess periodicals have long made Isaac Boleslavsky one of the leading theorists in the world.

A book of his best games, published in 1990, won the prize as the best chess book published in Great Britain that year.

=== Boleslavsky hole ===
The Boleslavsky hole formation

Position: a7 black pawn, b7 black pawn, f7 black pawn, g7 black pawn, h7 black pawn, d6 black pawn, e5 black pawn, e4 white pawn, a2 white pawn, b2 white pawn, c2 white pawn, f2 white pawn, g2 white pawn, h2 white pawn

In the Sicilian, a certain pawn structure is named after him called the Boleslavsky hole. This is where Black elects to play ...e5 leaving a backward pawn on d6 and also creating a 'hole' on the d5-square which could potentially become an outpost for a white knight at some stage in the game and is therefore seen as a potential weakness for the black side. This kind of formation is a well known structural feature in the Najdorf (cf. the "English attack" in the classical sense), but it can be contrasted against related but different Sicilians where Black chooses to play e6 instead of the e5 move; this avoids creating a 'hole' on d5 and the position instead transposes into a Scheveningen type of setup. It is not the case that ...e5 is considered a weaker move to play than the slightly more timid ...e6, but it could possibly be considered to be in the spirit of a less cautious, more aggressive, playing style. Despite the potential drawbacks of e5, it serves the positive function of "kicking" the centralized white knight on d4 back to a more passive location either on Nb3 or (less commonly) where it was originally positioned on Nf3; it can also go to e2 and happens here in Adams' attack. It is also worth mentioning that the backward pawn on d6 is not so easily targeted by the white pieces due to the fact that it is usually well protected by Black's dark squared bishop occupying the e7-square. Another positive role of playing ...e5 in one move is that it stakes a claim on one of the central squares. Obviously enough, it is possible to play ...e6 to get to the Scheveningen type of pawn structure and play ...e5 afterwards, so in this sense through loss of one tempo there can be a transposition from one type of pawn structure into another. According to Andrew Soltis, after a Boleslavsky hole is created, the idea is not to keep the pawn on d6 backwards; at some stage in the game, if Black is permitted to play a ...d6–d5 pawn advance this will free his dark squared bishop, releasing the position and freeing his game. In the famous Bg5 Najdorf Sicilian, the pawn advance e5 is rarely ever played at the top level because the white knight can hop into the f5-square with good practical chances for securing an advantage.

== Notable games ==
Boleslavsky had a plus record against Mikhail Tal (+2−0=3). He even beat Tal with the black pieces in Riga in 1958.

== See also ==
- List of Jewish chess players
