= Solomon Gotthilf =

Russian chess player (1903–1967)

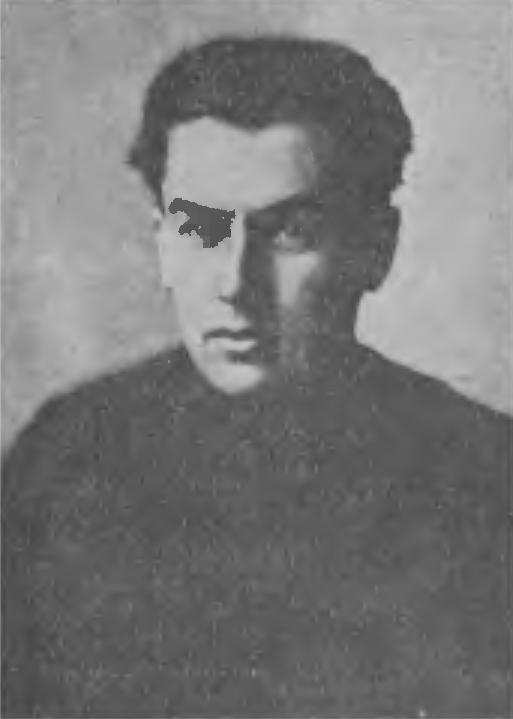
Solomon Gotthilf

Solomon Borisovich Gotthilf (Соло́мон Бори́сович Готгильф; 21 February 1903 – 11 July 1967) was a Russian chess master.

== Chess career ==
He shared 3rd in the 1922 Leningrad City Chess Championship (Grigory Levenfish won), took 6th in Leningrad City-ch in 1924, won twice at Leningrad 1925, shared 6th at Leningrad 1925 (the 4th USSR Chess Championship, Efim Bogoljubow won), took 3rd at Leningrad 1925 (Peter Romanovsky and Bogoljubov won), and tied for 18-19th in the Moscow 1925 chess tournament (Bogoljubow won).

== Retirement ==
He retired in Leningrad City-ch in 1926, took 4th at Leningrad 1927, took 7th in Leningrad City-ch in 1928 (Ilya Rabinovich won), shared 6th at Odessa 1929 (the 6th USSR-ch, quarter final), took 3rd at Leningrad 1930 (Mikhail Botvinnik won), tied for 12-13th at Leningrad 1934 (Rabinovich won), took 11th at Leningrad 1938 (Shamaev and Vladimir Alatortsev won), and tied for 16-17th at Leningrad 1938 (USSR-ch semifinal, Botvinnik won).

Gotthilf died in Leningrad in 1967.
