= Moscow 1935 chess tournament =

Moscow 1935 was the second international chess tournament held in Moscow, taking place from 15 February to 15 March 1935. Salo Flohr and future world champion Mikhail Botvinnik tied for first, followed by former world champions Emanuel Lasker and José Raúl Capablanca.

== Tournament field ==
The single round-robin tournament was organized along the lines of Moscow 1925, with twelve Soviet players and eight international players. Of the twelve Soviets, only four, Grigory Levenfish, Peter Romanovsky, Ilya Rabinovich and Fedir Bohatyrchuk had played at the 1925 event.

Salo Flohr (Czechoslovakia) was internationally renowned and considered a world championship contender. Later, Flohr would be in the inaugural group to receive the grandmaster title when it was introduced by FIDE in 1950. Mikhail Botvinnik (Soviet Union) was known as a rising star at age 24 and two years earlier had drawn a match with Flohr. He would later become world champion in 1948. Botvinnik and Flohr (together with Levenfish) jumped out to an early lead in the tournament. After round 15, Flohr led Botvinnik by half a point. Botvinnik won in round 16 while Flohr only drew to bring the two into a first-place tie, the tournament's ultimate result as both players drew all their games in the final three rounds. Botvinnik had scored only 50% in his final nine games.

Emanuel Lasker (Germany) and José Raúl Capablanca (Cuba) were former world champions. At age 66, Lasker was undefeated, beating Capablanca in their individual game and finishing third, a half point ahead of Capablanca in fourth place. Reuben Fine hailed Lasker's result at age 66 as "a biological miracle." Rudolph Spielmann (Austria), finished fifth.

== Crosstable ==
#	Player	1	2	3	4	5	6	7	8	9	10	11	12	13	14	15	16	17	18	19	20	Total
1	Salo Flohr (Czechoslovakia)	—	½	½	½	½	½	½	½	½	1	1	½	½	1	1	1	1	1	½	½	13
2	Mikhail Botvinnik (Soviet Union)	½	—	½	½	1	0	1	½	1	1	½	1	½	1	½	0	1	½	1	1	13
3	Emanuel Lasker (Germany)	½	½	—	1	½	1	½	½	½	½	½	½	½	1	½	½	½	1	1	1	12½
4	José Raúl Capablanca (Cuba)	½	½	0	—	½	1	1	½	1	½	½	0	1	½	1	½	½	½	1	1	12
5	Rudolf Spielmann (Austria)	½	0	½	½	—	½	½	½	0	1	0	½	1	½	½	½	1	1	1	1	11
6	Ilya Kan (Soviet Union)	½	1	0	0	½	—	½	0	1	0	1	1	½	½	0	1	1	½	½	1	10½
7	Grigory Levenfish (Soviet Union)	½	0	½	0	½	½	—	½	½	½	0	1	1	½	1	1	1	½	0	1	10½
8	Andor Lilienthal (Hungary)	½	½	½	½	½	1	½	—	0	½	0	1	½	½	½	½	0	1	1	½	10
9	Viacheslav Ragozin (Soviet Union)	½	0	½	0	1	0	½	1	—	0	½	1	0	½	½	½	1	1	½	1	10
10	Peter Romanovsky (Soviet Union)	0	0	½	½	0	1	½	½	1	—	1	0	½	½	½	½	1	0	1	1	10
11	Ilya Rabinovich (Soviet Union)	0	½	½	½	1	0	1	1	½	0	—	0	1	½	0	½	0	½	1	1	9½
12	Nikolai Riumin (Soviet Union)	½	0	½	1	½	0	0	0	0	1	1	—	0	½	0	1	1	1	½	1	9½
13	Vladimir Alatortsev (Soviet Union)	½	½	½	0	0	½	0	½	1	½	0	1	—	0	1	½	½	½	1	1	9½
14	Victor Goglidze (Soviet Union)	0	0	0	½	½	½	½	½	½	½	½	½	1	—	½	½	0	1	1	1	9½
15	Georgy Lisitsin (Soviet Union)	0	½	½	0	½	1	0	½	½	½	1	1	0	½	—	0	½	½	½	1	9
16	Fedor Bohatirchuk (Soviet Union)	0	1	½	½	½	0	0	½	½	½	½	0	½	½	1	—	½	½	0	½	8
17	Gideon Ståhlberg (Sweden)	0	0	½	½	0	0	0	1	0	0	1	0	½	1	½	½	—	½	1	1	8
18	Vasja Pirc (Yugoslavia)	0	½	0	½	0	½	½	0	0	1	½	0	½	0	½	½	½	—	1	1	7½
19	Vitaly Chekhover (Soviet Union)	½	0	0	0	0	½	1	0	½	0	0	½	0	0	½	1	0	0	—	1	5½
20	Vera Menchik (England)	½	0	0	0	0	0	0	½	0	0	0	0	0	0	0	½	0	0	0	—	1½
