= Moscow 1925 chess tournament =

This international super-tournament, organised by Nikolai Krylenko, was held at Moscow in the Soviet Union, from 10 November to 8 December 1925. It was the world's first state-sponsored chess tournament. There were eleven foreign stars and ten Soviet masters. World champion José Raúl Capablanca and his predecessor Emanuel Lasker were expected to be the main contenders, as they had been in the New York 1924 chess tournament, but the Soviet master Efim Bogoljubov achieved an unexpected victory. Lasker finished 1½ points behind Bogolyubov and just ahead of Capablanca.

The film Chess Fever used a number of scenes from the tournament, and even featured Capablanca playing himself. The Cuban-Soviet film Capablanca has its main plot during the tournament.

== Results ==
The results and standings:

#	Player	1	2	3	4	5	6	7	8	9	10	11	12	13	14	15	16	17	18	19	20	21	Total
1	Efim Bogoljubov (Soviet Union)	x	½	0	½	1	1	0	½	1	1	½	1	1	½	1	1	1	1	1	1	1	15½
2	Emanuel Lasker (Germany)	½	x	½	1	½	0	½	1	½	1	1	1	1	1	0	½	1	½	½	1	1	14
3	José Raúl Capablanca (Cuba)	1	½	x	1	1	½	½	½	½	0	1	0	½	½	½	½	1	1	1	1	1	13½
4	Frank James Marshall (United States)	½	0	0	x	½	0	1	1	½	0	1	1	1	1	1	1	½	0	½	1	1	12½
5	Savielly Tartakower (Poland)	0	½	0	½	x	½	1	½	½	½	½	1	1	1	½	1	1	½	½	½	½	12
6	Carlos Torre Repetto (Mexico)	0	1	½	1	½	x	½	0	½	½	0	1	½	½	1	½	0	1	1	1	1	12
7	Richard Réti (Czechoslovakia)	1	½	½	0	0	½	x	1	0	1	1	½	0	½	½	1	1	½	1	½	½	11½
8	Peter Romanovsky (Soviet Union)	½	0	½	0	½	1	0	x	1	0	½	1	0	0	1	1	1	½	1	1	1	11½
9	Ernst Grünfeld (Austria)	0	½	½	½	½	½	1	0	x	1	½	½	½	0	½	1	1	½	½	½	½	10½
10	Alexander Ilyin-Genevsky (Soviet Union)	0	0	1	1	½	½	0	1	0	x	½	0	1	½	0	½	1	½	½	1	1	10½
11	Fedor Bogatyrchuk (Soviet Union)	½	0	0	0	½	1	0	½	½	½	x	½	½	1	½	1	½	½	½	½	1	10
12	Boris Verlinsky (Soviet Union)	0	0	1	0	0	0	½	0	½	1	½	x	1	1	1	½	0	1	½	1	0	9½
13	Rudolf Spielmann (Austria)	0	0	½	0	0	½	1	1	½	0	½	0	x	1	1	½	½	1	½	0	1	9½
14	Akiba Rubinstein (Poland)	½	0	½	0	0	½	½	1	1	½	0	0	0	x	1	0	0	1	1	1	1	9½
15	Grigory Levenfish (Soviet Union)	0	1	½	0	½	0	½	0	½	1	½	0	0	0	x	1	1	½	½	1	½	9
16	Ilya Rabinovich (Soviet Union)	0	½	½	0	0	½	0	0	0	½	0	½	½	1	0	x	1	½	1	1	1	8½
17	Fred Yates (England)	0	0	0	½	0	1	0	0	0	0	½	1	½	1	0	0	x	1	½	0	1	7
18	Friedrich Sämisch (Germany)	0	½	0	1	½	0	½	½	½	½	½	0	0	0	½	½	0	x	0	1	0	6½
19	Solomon Gotthilf (Soviet Union)	0	½	0	½	½	0	0	0	½	½	½	½	½	0	½	0	½	1	x	0	½	6½
20	Fyodor Duz-Khotimirsky (Soviet Union)	0	0	0	0	½	0	½	0	½	0	½	0	1	0	0	0	1	0	1	x	1	6
21	Nikolai Zubarev (Soviet Union)	0	0	0	0	½	0	½	0	½	0	0	1	0	0	½	0	0	1	½	0	x	4½
