= Moritz Porges =

Czech chess player

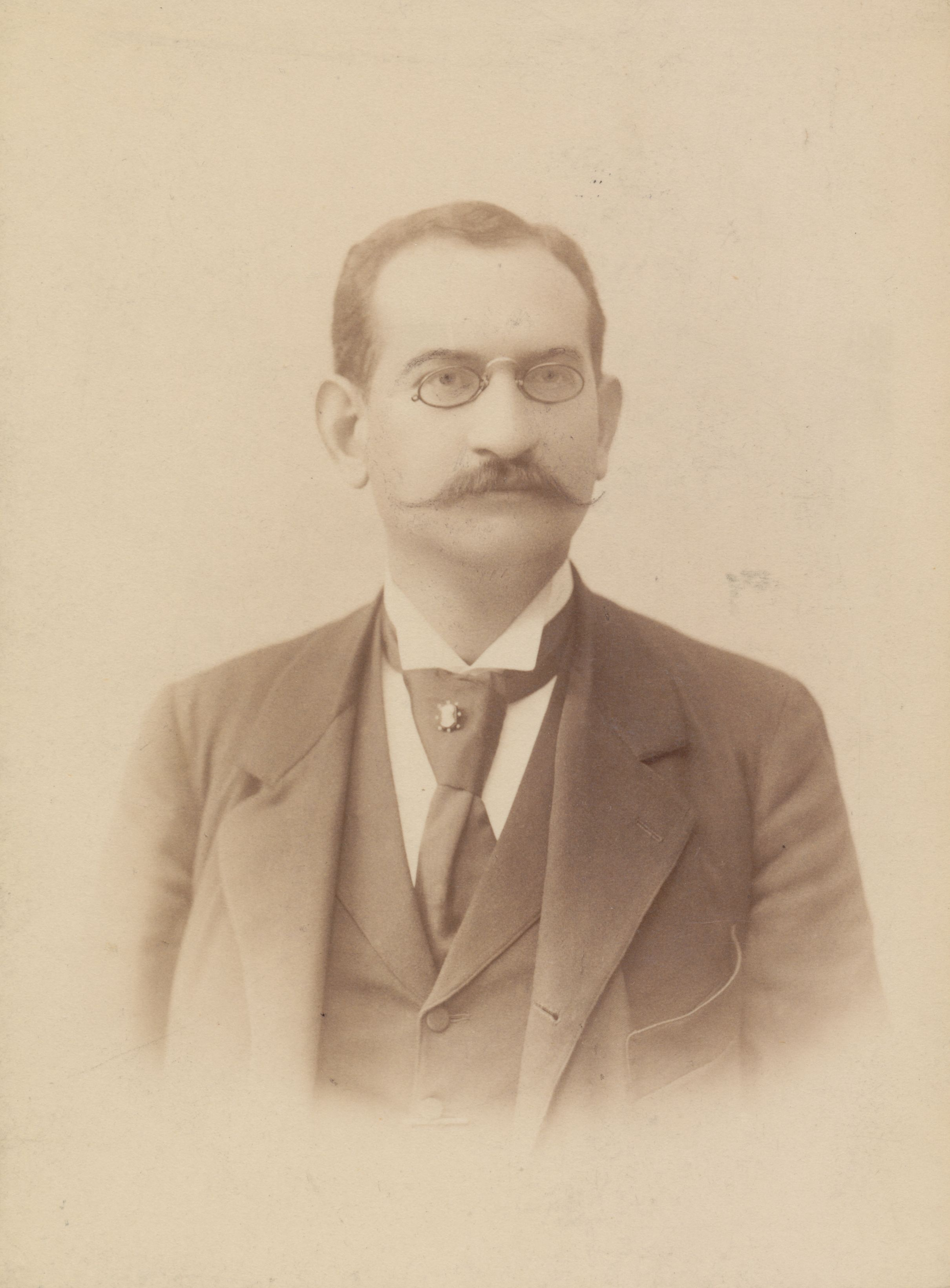
Moritz Porges

Moritz Porges (1857–1909) was a Jewish Czech chess player.

In 1882, he tied for 4–7th in Vienna (Vincenz Hruby won).

In 1892, he shared 2nd with Gyula Makovetz, behind Siegbert Tarrasch, in Dresden (the 7th DSB Congress).

He tied for 16–17th at Nuremberg 1896 (Emanuel Lasker won).

In 1902, he took 3rd, behind Viktor Tietz and Dawid Janowski, in Carlsbad (Triangular).
