= Lasker versus Bauer, Amsterdam, 1889 =

Chess match

Animation of the game (Lasker white; Bauer black)

The chess game between Emanuel Lasker and Johann Bauer played in Amsterdam in 1889 is one of the most famous on account of Lasker's sacrifice of both bishops to eliminate the pawn cover around his opponent's king, winning material and the game.

The same sacrificial pattern was echoed in a number of later games, notably Nimzowitsch–Tarrasch, St Petersburg 1914; Miles–Browne, Lucerne 1982; and Polgar–Karpov, Seventh Essent 2003.

The game against Bauer was played at the beginning of Lasker's career in the first round of the 1889 Amsterdam tournament, Lasker's first high-level closed event. Lasker finished second with a 6/8 score, a point behind the winner Amos Burn, and ahead of James Mason and Isidor Gunsberg, among others. Bauer finished sixth of the nine participants with a score of 3½/8.

A similar sacrifice occurred earlier in Burn–Owen, 1884, but in this case the sacrifice by John Owen was not correct and he lost the game. Nevertheless, it may have been an inspiration for Lasker.

== The game ==
White: Emanuel Lasker Black: Johann Bauer Opening: Bird's Opening (ECO A03)

Position: a8 black rook, f8 black rook, g8 black king, b7 black bishop, e7 black bishop, f7 black pawn, g7 black pawn, h7 black pawn, a6 black pawn, b6 black pawn, c6 black queen, e6 black pawn, c5 black pawn, d5 black pawn, e5 white bishop, h5 black knight, f4 white pawn, b3 white pawn, d3 white bishop, e3 white pawn, a2 white pawn, c2 white pawn, d2 white pawn, e2 white queen, g2 white pawn, h2 white pawn, a1 white rook, f1 white rook, g1 white king

Position after 14...Nxh5

1. f4 d5 2. e3 Nf6 3. b3 e6 4. Bb2 Be7 5. Bd3 b6 6. Nc3 Bb7 7. Nf3 Nbd7 8. 0-0 0-0 9. Ne2 c5 10. Ng3 Qc7 11. Ne5 Nxe5 12. Bxe5 Qc6 13. Qe2 a6?? 14. Nh5 Nxh5 (diagram)

13...a6 is a fatal error. 13...g6 would give Black solid equality. Instead, this blunder hands Lasker his double-bishop sacrifice, which eventually wins material and the game by force.

15. Bxh7+ Kxh7 16. Qxh5+ Kg8 17. Bxg7 Kxg7

Refusing the second bishop does not save Black: 17...f5 loses to 18.Be5 Rf6 19.Rf3 with Rg3 to follow, and 17...f6 loses to 18.Bh6.

18. Qg4+ Kh7 19. Rf3

Black must give up his queen to avoid mate.

19... e5 20. Rh3+ Qh6 21. Rxh6+ Kxh6 22. Qd7

Were it not for this move, forking the two bishops, Black would have adequate compensation for his queen, but now Lasker has a decisive material advantage. Now Lasker converts this advantage into the win.

22... Bf6 23. Qxb7 Kg7 24. Rf1 Rab8 25. Qd7 Rfd8 26. Qg4+ Kf8 27. fxe5 Bg7 28. e6 Rb7 29. Qg6 f6 30. Rxf6+ Bxf6 31. Qxf6+ Ke8 32. Qh8+ Ke7 33. Qg7+ Kxe6 34. Qxb7 Rd6 35. Qxa6 d4 36. exd4 cxd4 37. h4 d3 38. Qxd3 1–0

Black resigned.

Position: b6 black pawn, d6 black rook, e6 black king, h4 white pawn, b3 white pawn, d3 white queen, a2 white pawn, c2 white pawn, d2 white pawn, g2 white pawn, g1 white king

Final position after 38.Qxd3

== See also ==
- List of chess games
