= Ilya Kan =

Soviet chess player

Ilya Abramovich Kan (Russian: Илья Абрамович Кан; 4 May 1909 – 12 December 1978) was a Soviet chess player, arbiter, and writer. He was awarded the title of International Master (IM) by FIDE in 1950, as well as the title of International Arbiter in 1956. Kan was a lawyer by profession.

Ilya Abramovich Kan

Kan was born in Samara. He played ten times in the Soviet Championship finals. In 1929, he finished third in Odessa in the 6th edition of the championship, won by Boris Verlinsky. In 1931, he took 7th place in Moscow (7th URS-ch; Mikhail Botvinnik won). In 1933, he took 9th in Leningrad (8th URS-ch; Botvinnik won). In 1934-35, he tied for 9-12th in Leningrad (9th URS-ch; Grigory Levenfish and Ilya Rabinovich won). In 1937, he took 13th in Tbilisi (10th URS-ch; Levenfish won). In 1939, he tied for 13-14th in Leningrad (11th URS-ch; Botvinnik won). In 1945, he took 17th in Moscow (14th URS-ch; Botvinnik won). In 1947, he tied for 13-15th in Leningrad (15th URS-ch; Paul Keres won). In 1952, he took 18th in Moscow (20th URS-ch; Botvinnik and Mark Taimanov won). In 1955, he took 17th in Moscow (22nd URS-ch; Vasily Smyslov and Efim Geller won).

In the 1931 Moscow Championship, he finished in second place, behind Nikolai Riumin. In the 1933/34 edition, also won by Riumin, Kan placed 5th. In 1934, he took 5th in Leningrad (Botvinnik won). He tied for 6-7th at Moscow 1935 (2nd it; Botvinnik and Salo Flohr won). In 1936, he tied for 7-10th in Moscow (3rd it; José Raúl Capablanca won). In 1936, he tied for 1st-2nd with Vladimir Alatortsev in Moscow–ch. In 1937, he took 4th in Moscow–ch (Alatortsev and Sergey Belavenets won). In 1937, he took 2nd, behind Reuben Fine, in Moscow. The website Chessmetrics.com, which retroactively rates older players, ranks Kan as 13th in the world in 1944.

His opening theory contributions were mainly in the Sicilian Defence variation which bears his name: 1.e4 c5 2.Nf3 e6 3.d4 cxd4 4.Nxd4 a6. This flexible line has been adopted frequently by top players since 1950, including Anatoly Karpov and Tony Miles. The line is also known as the Paulsen Variation, named after Louis Paulsen, who played it earlier in the 19th century. Kan scored several victories over Botvinnik early in his career; Botvinnik was World Champion in 1948–1957, 1958–1960, and 1961–1963.

He was editor-in-chief of Chess-Bulletin, a well-known Russian Chess Magazine Shakhmatny Bulletin issue 6.
