= Lasker's Manual of Chess =

Chess book by Emanuel Lasker

Front cover of 1947 edition edited by Fred Reinfeld

Lasker's Manual of Chess (German: Lehrbuch des Schachspiels) is a book on the game of chess written in 1925 by former World Chess Champion Emanuel Lasker. The content of the book, as Lasker himself writes, is most influenced by the theories put forth by Steinitz, as well as Staunton's The Chess-Player's Handbook.

== Contents ==
The book is divided into six sections: The Elements of Chess, The Theory of the Openings, The Combination, Position Play, The Aesthetic Effect in Chess, and Examples and Models.

The Elements of Chess opens with a description of the chessboard, the various rules of chess, and the relative values of the pieces. Lasker quickly moves on to the fundamentals of chess strategy and tactics, and ends the section with examples of some of the basic mates. He also explains how to read descriptive chess notation, which is used throughout the book.

The Theory of the Openings begins with an explanation of the general principles of opening play and how openings affect the course of the middlegame and endgame. The rest of the section attempts to cover many of the major openings, providing example games and analyses of each. The section ends by detailing the increasing value of pawns as they advance in rank, in contrast to their value in the opening.

The Combination covers combinational play (also called "tactical play" or "tactics"), beginning with explanations of some basic combinations, and moving on to detail a number of games meant to exemplify combinational style. Lasker goes on to explain how combinations can be most effectively countered, and what common "motifs" emerge from combinational play. He also spends considerable time on the subject of piece sacrifices and passed pawns.

Position Play is prefaced with an exposition on the difference between positional play and combinational play, and Lasker stresses their diametrical opposition. He explains the importance of having a clear "plan" of the game, and provides a number of example games. The rest of the section is concerned with identifying and describing the various "features" and "advantages" of a position, such as its pawn structure and potential for piece cooperation. In the closing pages of the section Lasker criticizes the hypermodern school of chess for disregarding many accepted principles of positional play.

The Aesthetic Effect in Chess finds Lasker expounding on the ways that the subjective "aesthetic valuations" of a "spectator" cause him or her to have vastly different opinions of the same game. The rest of the section comprises various famously uncanny games, such as the Immortal game and the Evergreen game, with some analysis from Lasker.

Examples and Models, the book's final section, consists entirely of a number of illustrative games, each with a thorough analysis.

The book closes with a short essay titled Final Reflections, in which Lasker describes the state of education in the world as "frightfully wasteful of time and values", and states that this "sickness" is responsible for the difficulties many players face in learning chess. Lasker also goes on to speculate about the mathematics of chess, the "physics of contest", and the correctness of Steinitz's theories.

== Updated edition ==
An updated edition with a foreword by Mark Dvoretsky was published in 2008.
