= Kotopeky =

- Municipality
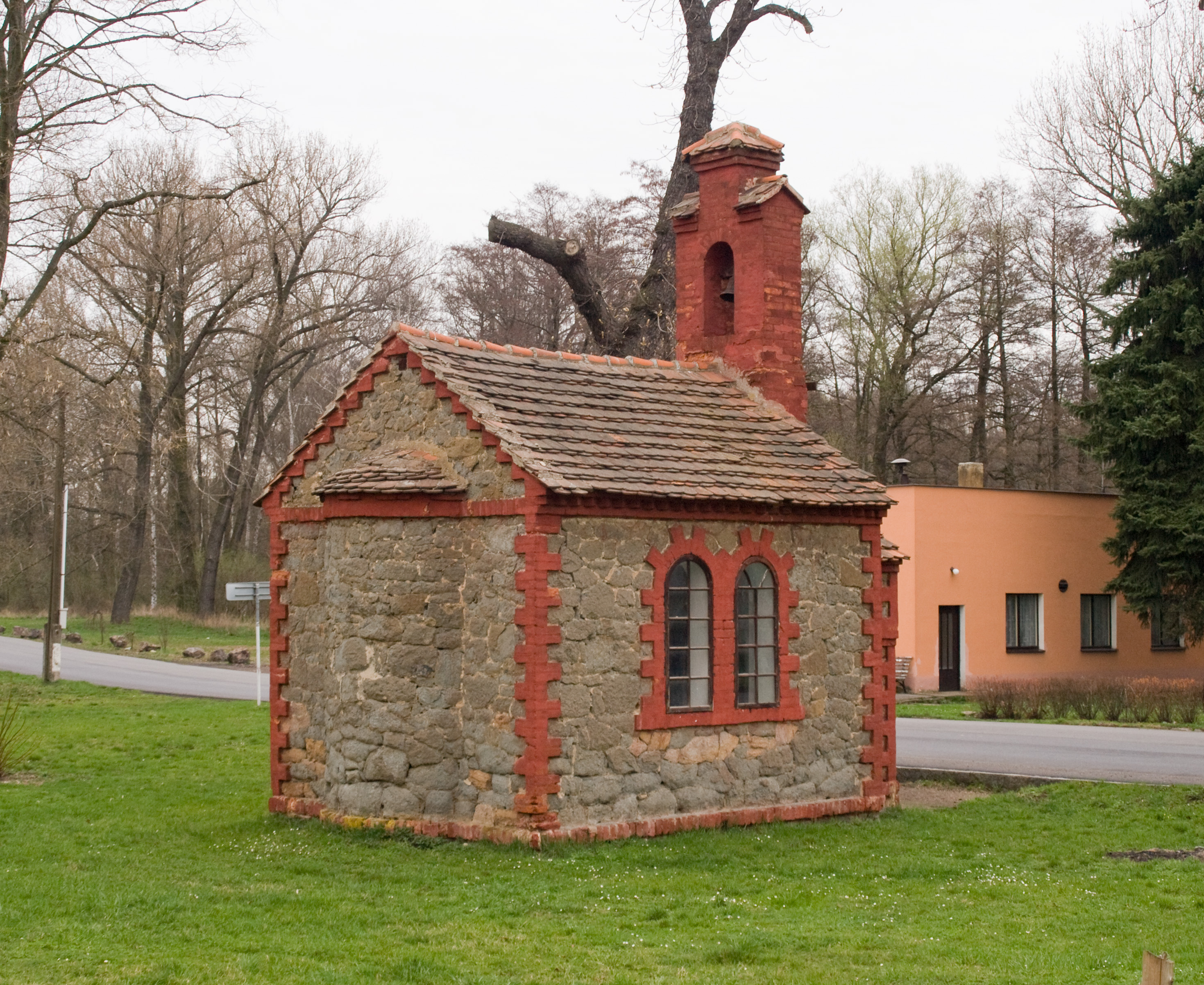
- Chapel of Saint Wenceslaus

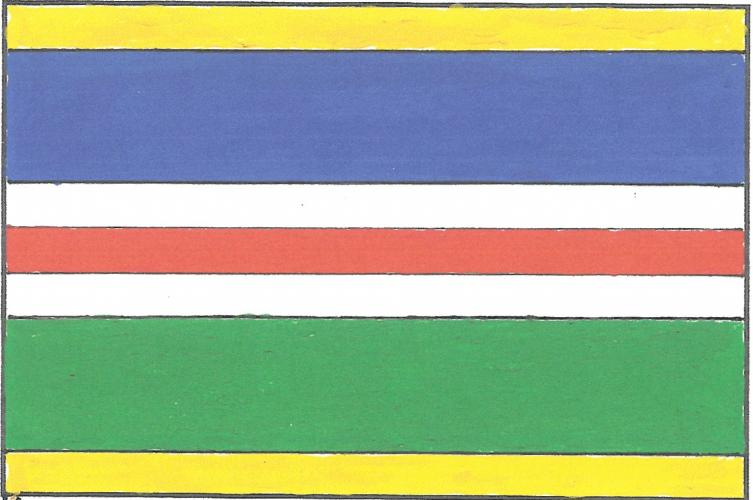
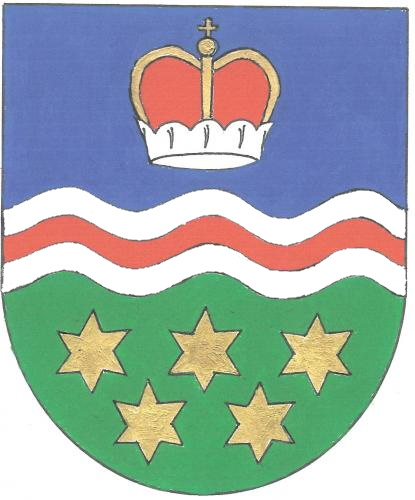
- Flag Coat of arms

- Location in the Czech Republic
- Coordinates: 49°51′25″N 13°55′31″E
- Country: Czech Republic
- Region: Central Bohemian
- District: Beroun
- First mentioned: 1320

Area
  - Total: 3.93 km^{2} (1.52 sq mi)
- Elevation: 411 m (1,348 ft)

Population (2026-01-01)
  - Total: 293
  - Density: 74.6/km^{2} (193/sq mi)
- Time zone: UTC+1 (CET)
  - Summer (DST): UTC+2 (CEST)
- Postal code: 268 01
- Website: www.obec-kotopeky.cz

Kotopeky is a municipality and village in Beroun District in the Central Bohemian Region of the Czech Republic. It has about 300 inhabitants.

== Administrative division ==
Kotopeky consists of two municipal parts (in brackets population according to the 2021 census):

- Kotopeky (120)
- Tihava (174)

== Demographics ==
Historical population
Year	Pop.	±%
1869	336	—
1880	338	+0.6%
1890	334	−1.2%
1900	377	+12.9%
1910	480	+27.3%
1921	438	−8.8%
1930	426	−2.7%
1950	354	−16.9%
1961	352	−0.6%
1970	319	−9.4%
1980	310	−2.8%
1991	282	−9.0%
2001	278	−1.4%
2011	279	+0.4%
2021	294	+5.4%
Source: Censuses

== Notable people ==
- Johann Hermann Bauer (1861–1891), Austrian chess master
