= Nuremberg 1896 chess tournament =

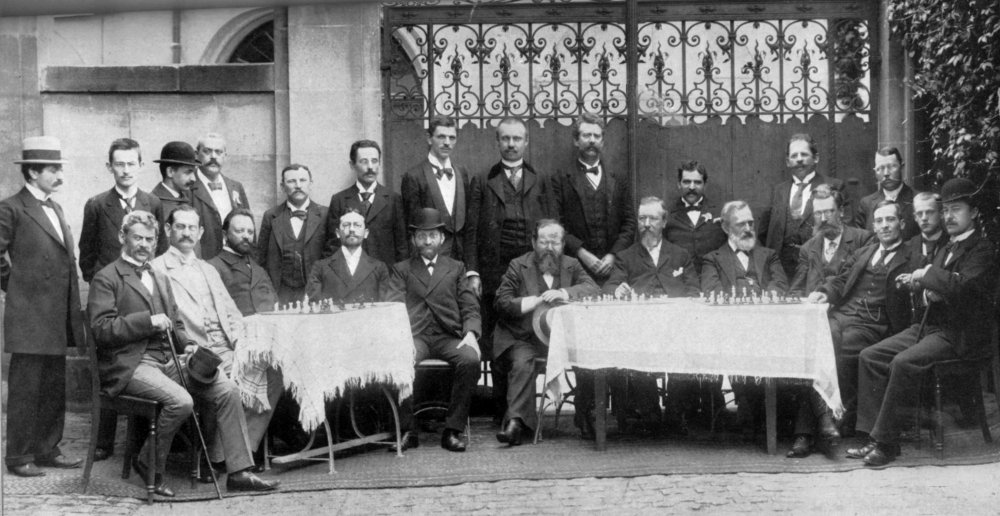
Standing: Lasker, Charousek, Schlechter, two organisers, Janowsky, Maróczy, Marco, Showalter, three organisers. Seated: Albin, Porges, Chigorin, Tarrasch, Winawer, Steinitz, Blackburne, Schallopp, Schiffers, Pillsbury, Walbrodt, Teichmann

The tournament at Nürnberg 1896 should have become 10. Deutschen Schachbund Kongreß (German Chess Congress), but the local chess club took over the organisation and included no minor groups. Finally, the 10th DSB Congress was held in Eisenach in 1896 (Robert Henry Barnes won Meisterturnier, and Wilhelm Cohn won Hauptturnier).

Thirty-nine players wanted to participate in the master competition, nineteen were allowed in Nuremberg. When Amos Burn withdrew, the little-known Rudolf Charousek took his place at the recommendation of Géza Maróczy. The international tournament was played in the premises of the Museum Society in Nuremberg from 20 July until 9 August. The time limit was thirty moves in two hours. The main prizes went to Emanuel Lasker (3000 marks), Géza Maróczy (2000 marks), Siegbert Tarrasch and Harry Nelson Pillsbury (each 1250 marks), Dawid Janowski (600 marks), Wilhelm Steinitz (300 marks), Carl August Walbrodt and Carl Schlechter (each 100 marks).

#	Player	1	2	3	4	5	6	7	8	9	10	11	12	13	14	15	16	17	18	19	Total
1	Emanuel Lasker (German Empire)	*	½	1	0	0	1	½	½	1	1	1	0	1	1	1	1	1	1	1	13½
2	Géza Maróczy (Hungary)	½	*	½	1	1	0	½	½	½	½	½	1	½	1	1	1	1	1	½	12½
3	Siegbert Tarrasch (German Empire)	0	½	*	0	1	1	½	½	1	1	0	1	1	1	1	½	½	½	1	12
4	Harry Nelson Pillsbury (United States)	1	0	1	*	½	1	0	½	0	1	0	½	1	1	1	1	½	1	1	12
5	Dawid Janowski (France)	1	0	0	½	*	1	1	1	1	0	½	0	1	½	1	0	1	1	1	11½
6	Wilhelm Steinitz (Bohemia)	0	1	0	0	0	*	½	1	½	1	1	1	1	0	0	1	1	1	1	11
7	Carl August Walbrodt (German Empire)	½	½	½	1	0	½	*	½	½	1	0	0	½	1	1	1	1	1	0	10½
8	Carl Schlechter (Austria)	½	½	½	½	0	0	½	*	½	1	½	½	½	1	1	½	½	1	1	10½
9	Emanuel Schiffers (Russian Empire)	0	½	0	1	0	½	½	½	*	½	0	½	½	1	½	1	½	1	1	9½
10	Mikhail Chigorin (Russian Empire)	0	½	0	0	1	0	0	0	½	*	1	1	½	1	1	0	1	1	1	9½
11	Joseph Henry Blackburne (United Kingdom)	0	½	1	1	½	0	1	½	1	0	*	0	0	0	1	1	0	1	½	9
12	Rudolf Charousek (Hungary)	1	0	0	½	1	0	1	½	½	0	1	*	½	0	½	1	1	0	0	8½
13	Georg Marco (Austria)	0	½	0	0	0	0	½	½	½	½	1	½	*	½	1	½	½	1	½	8
14	Adolf Albin (Romania)	0	0	0	0	½	1	0	0	0	0	1	1	½	*	0	½	½	1	1	7
15	Szymon Winawer (Poland)	0	0	0	0	0	1	0	0	½	0	0	½	0	1	*	1	1	1	½	6½
16	Jackson Showalter (United States)	0	0	½	0	1	0	0	½	0	1	0	0	½	½	0	*	½	0	1	5½
17	Moritz Porges (Bohemia)	0	0	½	½	0	0	0	½	½	0	1	0	½	½	0	½	*	0	1	5½
18	Emil Schallopp (German Empire)	0	0	½	0	0	0	0	0	0	0	0	1	0	0	0	1	1	*	1	4½
19	Richard Teichmann (German Empire)	0	½	0	0	0	0	1	0	0	0	½	1	½	0	½	0	0	0	*	4

== Literature ==
Dr. Siegbert Tarrasch und Schröder, Chr.: Das Internationale Schachturnier des Schachclubs Nürnberg im Juli-August 1896. Sammlung sämtlicher Partien. Nachdruck der Ausgabe Leipzig 1897. Reprint Band 28. Olms, Zürich 1982.
