= Edward Lasker =

German-American engineer, chess and Go player (1885–1981)

Personal information
- Born: Eduard Lasker; December 3, 1885 Kępno, Prussia, Germany
- Died: March 25, 1981 (aged 95) New York City, U.S.

Chess career
- Country: German Empire (before 1917); United States (after 1917)
- Title: International Master (1963)

Edward Lasker (born Eduard Lasker; December 3, 1885 – March 25, 1981) was a German-American chess and Go player. He was awarded the title of International Master of chess by FIDE. Lasker was an engineer by profession, and an author of books on Go, chess and checkers. Born in Prussia, he emigrated to the United States in 1914. He was distantly related to World Chess Champion Emanuel Lasker with whom he is sometimes confused.

== Early life and education ==
Lasker was born in Kempen, Province of Posen, Prussia, German Empire (present-day Kępno, Poland), the son of Sigismund Lasker and Flora Bornstein. He studied in Breslau (now Wrocław) and in Charlottenburg (now part of Berlin).

Lasker earned undergraduate degrees at the Technische Hochschule in Charlottenburg (now Technische Universität Berlin) in Mechanical and Electrical Engineering, graduating in 1910.

== Engineering career ==
Before World War I he moved first to London and then, in 1914 shortly after the outbreak of war, to the U.S., the birthplace of his mother. He found a job in Chicago, working for Sears & Roebuck as a safety engineer. When the United States entered the war in 1917, he was sent enlistment papers, but with the right of exemption as a German. He waived his right to exemption, which he said would make his American citizenship be granted more quickly; however, the war was over before he was called up to military service.

In 1921–23, he invented a mechanical breast pump, which saved many premature infants' lives and made Lasker much money, although it caused his friends to refer to him facetiously as "the chest player".

== Chess ==
His chess teacher in Breslau was Arnold Schottländer. In Berlin, he won the City Championship (1909) and wrote his first chess book titled Chess Strategy (Schachstrategie, 1911) which had many English and German editions.

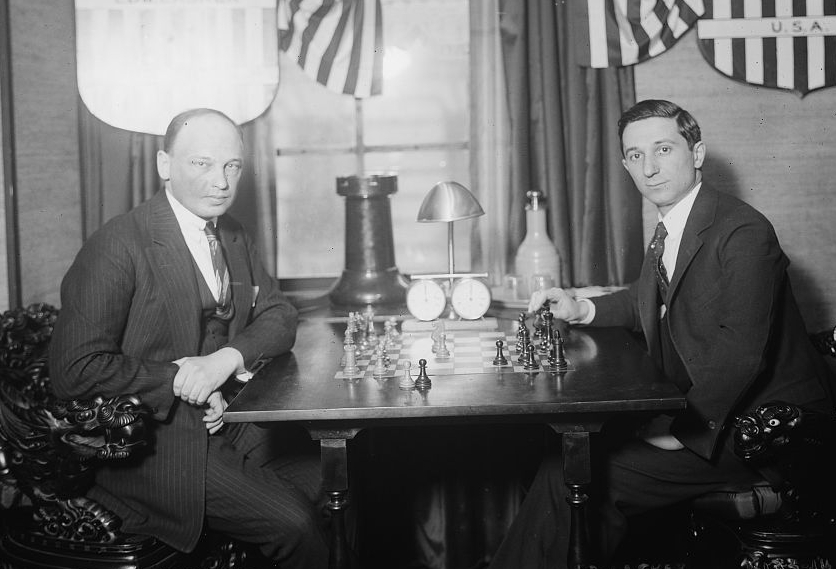
Lasker (right) with Savielly Tartakower

Lasker published several books on American checkers, chess, and Go. He won five U.S. Open Chess Championships (1916, 1917, 1919, 1920, 1921); this tournament was known at the time as the Western Open. His best result was his narrow 8½–9½ loss in a match with Frank Marshall for the U.S. Championship in 1923; this result was achieved even after Lasker had to take a postponement while leading the match due to a severe kidney stone attack.

For that, Lasker was invited to participate in the legendary New York 1924 chess tournament, a double round robin featuring such world class players as Alekhine, Efim Bogoljubov, Capablanca, Emanuel Lasker, and Réti. He finished tenth out of eleven players, but many of his games were competitive. For instance, he split with Alekhine, won games against Réti and Savielly Tartakower, both of whom were Top 10 in the world at the time according to the estimated rankings of the website Chessmetrics.com, drew Capablanca and drew a famous game against Emanuel Lasker.

In this game, the former World Champion lost a pronounced advantage and was only able to hold the draw against Edward by demonstrating that the inferior side can hold the draw in certain types of endings of rook and knight pawn versus a lone knight. The game lasted 103 moves and changed endgame theory, as this particular draw had not been demonstrated before in theory or practice. Lasker was the only chess amateur in the field of professionals.

His most famous game is probably the queen sacrifice and king hunt against Sir George Thomas. After Lasker checkmated him, Thomas said, "This was very nice." Lasker, who had yet to learn English, was touched by Thomas's sportsmanship after a spectator translated Thomas's remark into German for him. Lasker wrote that had he won the game against a leading Berlin amateur, his opponent would likely have told him, "You are just lucky! Had I played [10...Bxe5] instead of [...Qe7], you would have been lost."

Although Lasker never won against Capablanca, he drew as Black against him at the 1924 New York tournament. Lasker was not usually so fortunate; for example, Capablanca once arrived one minute before he would have forfeited the game for late arrival, at New York 1915, and Lasker played the Riga variation of the Ruy Lopez with which he had some experience, but Capablanca found an advantageous continuation over the board and won.

== Go ==
Lasker was deeply impressed by Go. He first read about it in a magazine article by Oskar Korschelt which suggested Go as a rival to chess, a claim that he found amusing. Later on his interest was piqued again when he noticed the record of a Go game on the back of a Japanese newspaper being read by a customer of a cafe where they played chess.

He and his friend Dr. Max Lange (1883–1923) – not to be confused with the more famous 19th-century chess master Max Lange – took the paper after he had left, and deciphered the diagram, but the game was not complete. The position led them to assume that the notation under the game would indicate a Black victory, but being unable to read Japanese, they had to ask another Japanese customer at the cafe. To their surprise, it was a resignation by Black. Only after three weeks of study was Max Lange able to understand the reason for White's victory. This experience led them to a deeper appreciation for the game, and they studied it in earnest, but were unable to interest other chess players.

After two years, Emanuel Lasker, then the world chess champion, returned to Germany from the United States. When Edward told him that he had found a game to rival chess, he was skeptical, but after being told the rules, and playing one game, he understood that Go was strategically deep. They started studying Go with Yasugoro Kitabatake, a Japanese student, and after two years were able to beat him with no handicap.

Kitabatake arranged a game for Edward, Emanuel, and Emanuel's brother Berthold, against a visiting Japanese mathematician, and strong Go player. The Laskers took a nine-stone handicap, and played in consultation with each other, considering their moves deeply, but their opponent beat them effortlessly and without taking much time to think. After the game, Emanuel suggested to Edward that they travel to Tokyo to study Go. In 1911, Edward got a job at AEG. After a year at the company, he tried to get transferred to the Tokyo office, but as the company only posted fluent English speakers in Tokyo, he went to work in England first.

Edward was detained there during the early part of World War I and never made it to Tokyo. He was, however, given permission to travel to the United States by Sir William Haldane-Porter, who was head of what would become the UK Immigration Service. Haldane-Porter remembered that Lasker had won the London chess championship in May 1914 and he had personally witnessed Edward's famous game against George Alan Thomas that same year. Edward Lasker was instrumental in developing Go in the U.S., and together with Karl Davis Robinson and Lee Hartman founded the American Go Association.

In 1971, Nihon Ki-in awarded him the Okura Prize for international promotion of Go.

== Personal life ==
Lasker lived in New York City until his death in 1981. He was friends with former World Champion Emanuel Lasker. Edward wrote in his memoirs of the New York 1924 tournament as published in the March 1974 edition of Chess Life magazine: "I did not discover that we were actually related until he (Emanuel Lasker) told me shortly before his death that someone had shown him a Lasker family tree on one of whose branches I was dangling."

In a February 8, 1973, letter to Robert B. Long, Lasker explained their exact relationship:

The genealogy, incidentally, indicates that the common forbear of Emanuel and myself was the son Samuel Lasker of the Rabbi of the Polish village Łask, whose name was originally Meier Hindels. However, later the additional name Lasker was given to him to distinguish him from another Meier Hindels also living in Lask. Samuel Lasker moved to another Polish village, Kępno, in 1769, after it had been captured by Frederick the Great and became a German township, and I am the last descendant of his who was born there. He was the great-grandfather of my great-grandfather. His first-born son left Kepmen [sic-Kempen] and moved to Jarotschin, another Polish village, and Emanuel Lasker was that one's great-grandson.

If true, this made Edward and Emanuel third cousins twice removed.

Lasker was the uncle of the cellist and Holocaust survivor Anita Lasker-Wallfisch; her father Alfons was Edward Lasker's brother.

== Bibliography ==
- Chess Strategy 1915 (second edition)
- Chess and Checkers: the Way to Mastership 1918
- Go and Go-Moku, 1934 (2nd ed. 1960).
- Chess for Fun and Chess for Blood, 1942 (2nd ed.), ISBN 0-486-20146-5.
- The Adventure of Chess, 1949 (2nd ed. 1959), ISBN 0-486-20510-X.
- Chess Secrets I Learned from the Masters (semi-autobiographical and instructional) (1951, 1969) ISBN 0-486-22266-7.
- Chess: The Complete Self-Tutor (1972, Algebraic Version 1997 with John Nunn) ISBN 0-7134-8160-9.

== Notable games ==
Position: a8 black rook, b8 black knight, f8 black rook, g8 black king, a7 black pawn, b7 black bishop, c7 black pawn, d7 black pawn, e7 black queen, g7 black pawn, h7 black pawn, b6 black pawn, e6 black pawn, f6 black bishop, e5 white knight, h5 white queen, d4 white pawn, e4 white knight, d3 white bishop, a2 white pawn, b2 white pawn, c2 white pawn, f2 white pawn, g2 white pawn, h2 white pawn, a1 white rook, e1 white king, h1 white rook

Position after 10...Qe7?? Checkmate in eight moves.

Position: a8 black rook, b8 black knight, f8 black rook, a7 black pawn, b7 black bishop, c7 black pawn, d7 black pawn, e7 black queen, g7 black pawn, b6 black pawn, e6 black pawn, f6 white knight, d4 white pawn, g4 white knight, h4 white pawn, g3 white pawn, a2 white pawn, b2 white pawn, c2 white pawn, d2 white king, e2 white bishop, f2 white pawn, h2 white rook, a1 white rook, g1 black king

Final position after 18.Kd2#

This is Lasker's most famous game, and one of the most famous games of all time.

Lasker vs. Sir George Thomas, London 1912 (offhand clock game):
1. d4 e6 2. Nf3 f5 3. Nc3 Nf6 4. Bg5 Be7 5. Bxf6 Bxf6 6. e4 fxe4 7. Nxe4 b6 8. Ne5 0-0 9. Bd3 Bb7 10. Qh5 Qe7?? (first diagram) 10...Bxe5! 11.Qxe5 Nc6 or 11.dxe5 Rf5 wins a pawn. 11. Qxh7+!! Kxh7 12. Nxf6+ Kh6 If 12...Kh8 13.Ng6#. 13. Neg4+ Kg5 14. h4+ 14.f4+ also forces mate, more rapidly if 14...Kxf4 15.g3+ Kg5 16.h4# or 15...Kf3 16.0-0#. 14... Kf4 15. g3+ Kf3 16. Be2+ 16.0-0 or 16.Kf1, with the threat 17.Nh2# as a quicker mate. 16... Kg2 17. Rh2+ Kg1 18. Kd2# 1–0 An alternative mating move was 18.0-0-0#, and 17.0-0-0 would also mate in one with 18.Rdg1#, regardless of Black's response.

== See also ==
- List of chess games
- List of Jewish chess players
