= Gyula Makovetz =

Hungarian journalist and chess player

Gyula Makovetz (Makowetz, Makovets) (29 December 1860, Arad – 8 August 1903, Budapest) was a Hungarian journalist and chess player.

He edited the chess magazine Budapesti Sakkszemle from 1889 to 1894. Makovetz was 1st, ahead of Johann Hermann Bauer and Emanuel Lasker, at Graz 1890. He shared 2nd place with Moritz Porges, behind Siegbert Tarrasch, at Dresden 1892 (the 7th DSB Congress). He won a match against Rudolf Charousek (3.5 : 2.5) at Budapest 1893.
