= Berthold Lasker =

German physician, writer and chess master (1860–1928)

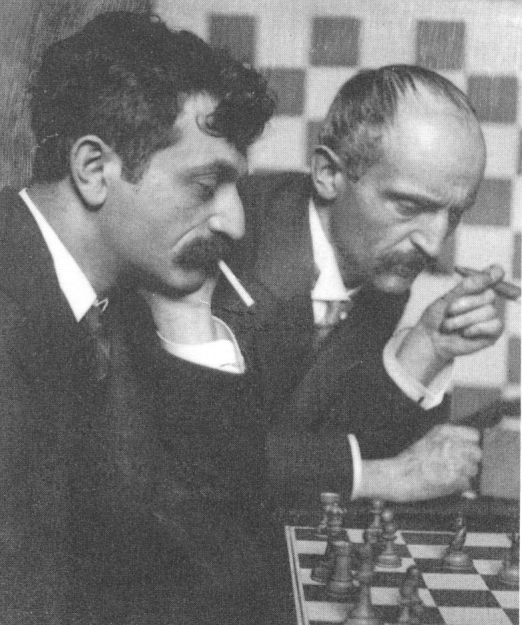
- Bertold (right) and Emanuel Lasker analysing chess board 1908 (photo by Frank Eugene)

Personal information
- Born: Jonathan Berthold Lasker; 31 December 1860 Berlinchen, Kingdom of Prussia
- Died: 19 October 1928 (aged 67) Berlin, Germany

Chess career
- Country: Germany

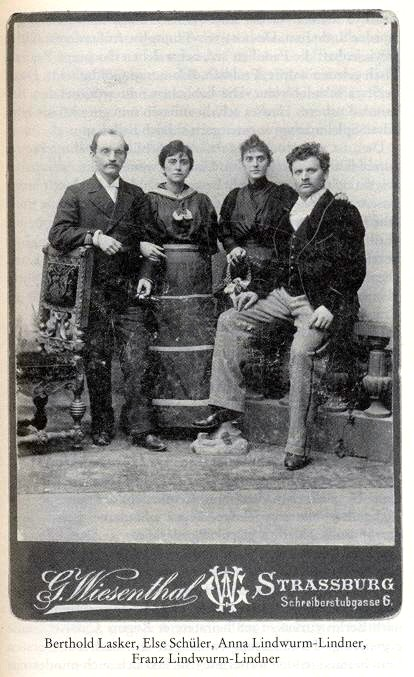
Berthold Lasker, Else Lasker-Schüler, Anna Lindwurm-Lindner, Franz Lindwurm-Lindner around 1900

Berthold Lasker (also, per birth registry Jonathan Berthold Barnett Lasker) (31 December 1860 – 19 October 1928) was a German physician, writer and chess master.

== Life ==
Berthold Lasker was born Jonathan Berthold Lasker in Berlinchen (Barlinek, now West Pomeranian Voivodeship, Poland). He was the son of a Jewish cantor and grandson of a well regarded Rabbi. He had a brother who was 8 years younger, the later World Chess Champion Emanuel Lasker. He attended the Friedrichwerdersches Gymnasium in Berlin and graduated in 1879 with the Abitur. From 1881 until 1888 he studied medicine at Humboldt-Universität zu Berlin. During this time he shared his flat with his brother Emanuel whom he drew into playing chess and the chess scene.

For about a year Lasker practised as a physician in Elberfeld, where he met the poet and playwright Else Lasker-Schüler. After they married in 1894, they lived in Berlin, where he practised as a specialist for skin diseases. The relationship with his wife was unhappy. In 1899, they had a son, the paternity of which his wife denied him in court, which the district court found credible. Lasker-Schüler accused her husband of violence, and in 1903 they were divorced.

At the beginning of the century, Lasker went to the U.S. for a longer period of time. He attempted to open a second office in New York City, without success.

=== Chess ===
After his stint in the U.S., Lasker permanently lived in Berlin. He played in local chess tournaments in Berlin. In the 1880s Lasker was, next to Curt von Bardeleben, Siegbert Tarrasch who studied in Berlin, Fritz Riemann, Emil Schallopp and Theodor von Scheve, one of the strongest chess players in Berlin and therefore in Germany.

In 1881, he shared 1st with Siegbert Tarrasch, and took 2nd, behind Curt von Bardeleben, there. In 1883, he tied for 1st-4th and took 4th (playoff) - Hermann von Gottschall won. In 1887, he tied for 5-6th (Max Harmonist won). Tarrasch called Lasker a "very genius player, whose strength rarely accorded due value in a tournament because of his nervousness.“.

His best achievement was a tie for 1st place with his brother, Emanuel Lasker, at Berlin 1890. He took 2nd, behind Horatio Caro, at Berlin 1891. In June 1891, Lasker achieved his highest Elo rating of 2683. He took 10th at Berlin 1898/99 (Theodor von Scheve, Emil Schallopp and Caro won).

In 1902, Lasker won the New York State championship.

=== Personal life, death ===
Together with his brother Emanuel, he wrote a drama called "Days of Mankind" in 1925. It contained deep philosophical symbolism, and the theme was "redemption for rationalists and rigid logic truth through the emotional powers of mysticism."

Lasker died in 1928 only a few months after the death of his second wife, Regina, and is buried in the Jewish cemetery in Berlin-Weissensee. The Hebrew inscription on his gravestone has been translated as: "May his soul be integrated into the bond of life".

== See also ==
- List of Jewish chess players
