= Johann Hermann Bauer =

Czech-Austrian chess master

Johann Hermann Bauer (23 June 1861 – 5 April 1891) was an Austrian chess master.

== Biography ==
Bauer was born on 23 June 1861 in Kotopeky in Bohemia, Austrian Empire (now the Czech Republic). His father was an estate owner in Kotopeky and a formally trained painter later in Prague. His mother Eleonora was an older sister of Czech composer Josef Richard Rozkošný.

As a youth he settled in Vienna and won the master title at Frankfurt 1887 (the 5th DSB Congress, Hauptturnier A). His best tournament achievement was at Graz 1890 (+3 –0 =3) where he finished in 2nd place behind Gyula Makovetz and ahead of Emanuel Lasker and Georg Marco. In 1891 whilst playing in a double-round tournament at Vienna his health broke down when he was sharing the lead with Adolf Albin.

He won matches against Bernhard Fleissig (2:0) in 1890, and Albin (4:0) and Marco (3:1), both in 1891.

J.H. Bauer is known mainly for losing to Emanuel Lasker as a result of a brilliant double-bishop sacrifice at Amsterdam 1889.

He died of tuberculosis at the age of 29 on 5 April 1891 in Gorizia.
