= Moravská Ostrava 1923 chess tournament =

Emanuel Lasker won the tournament ahead of Richard Réti.

== Tournament table ==
Moravská Ostrava 1923
| # | Player | 01 | 02 | 03 | 04 | 05 | 06 | 07 | 08 | 09 | 10 | 11 | 12 | 13 | 14 | Result |
|---|---|---|---|---|---|---|---|---|---|---|---|---|---|---|---|---|
| 1 | Emanuel Lasker (GER) | x | 1 | ½ | ½ | 1 | 1 | 1 | 1 | ½ | ½ | 1 | ½ | 1 | 1 | 10½ |
| 2 | Richard Réti (CSR) | 0 | * | ½ | ½ | 1 | ½ | ½ | 1 | 1 | ½ | 1 | 1 | 1 | 1 | 9½ |
| 3 | Ernst Grünfeld (AUT) | ½ | ½ | * | 1 | ½ | ½ | ½ | ½ | ½ | ½ | 1 | 1 | ½ | 1 | 8½ |
| 4 | Alexey Selezniev (RUS) | ½ | ½ | 0 | * | ½ | 1 | 1 | 0 | ½ | ½ | ½ | 1 | 1 | ½ | 7½ |
| 5–6 | Savielly Tartakower (POL) | 0 | 0 | ½ | ½ | * | ½ | ½ | ½ | 1 | 1 | ½ | 1 | ½ | ½ | 7 |
| 5–6 | Max Euwe (NED) | 0 | ½ | ½ | 0 | ½ | * | ½ | ½ | 0 | 1 | ½ | 1 | 1 | 1 | 7 |
| 7–8 | Siegbert Tarrasch (GER) | 0 | ½ | ½ | 0 | ½ | ½ | * | 1 | 1 | 0 | 1 | 0 | ½ | 1 | 6½ |
| 7–8 | Efim Bogoljubov (USSR) | 0 | 0 | ½ | 1 | ½ | ½ | 0 | * | 1 | 1 | 0 | 0 | 1 | 1 | 6½ |
| 9 | Rudolf Spielmann (AUT) | ½ | 0 | ½ | ½ | 0 | 1 | 0 | 0 | * | 1 | 1 | ½ | 0 | 1 | 6 |
| 10 | Akiba Rubinstein (POL) | ½ | ½ | ½ | ½ | 0 | 0 | 1 | 0 | 0 | * | ½ | 1 | ½ | ½ | 5½ |
| 11 | Amos Pokorný (CSR) | 0 | 0 | 0 | ½ | ½ | ½ | 0 | 1 | 0 | ½ | * | 1 | ½ | ½ | 5 |
| 12–13 | Karel Hromádka (CSR) | ½ | 0 | 0 | 0 | 0 | 0 | 1 | 1 | ½ | 0 | 0 | * | 1 | ½ | 4½ |
| 12–13 | Heinrich Wolf (AUT) | 0 | 0 | ½ | 0 | ½ | 0 | ½ | 0 | 1 | ½ | ½ | 0 | * | 1 | 4½ |
| 14 | Max Walter (CSR) | 0 | 0 | 0 | ½ | ½ | 0 | 0 | 0 | 0 | ½ | ½ | ½ | 0 | * | 2½ |
