= New York 1924 chess tournament =

American chess competition

photo of the players

New York 1924 was an elite chess tournament held in the Alamac Hotel in New York City from March 16 to April 18, 1924. It was organized by the Manhattan Chess Club. The competitors included world champion José Raúl Capablanca and his predecessor Emanuel Lasker. Nine other top players from Europe and America were also invited. Emanuel Lasker met Alexander Alekhine, Efim Bogoljubow, Géza Maróczy, Richard Réti, Savielly Tartakower and Fred Yates in Hamburg. They steamed with the SS Cleveland on February 28, 1924, and joined Capablanca, Frank Marshall, Dawid Janowski and Edward Lasker in New York. The tournament was played as a double round robin, with each player meeting every other one twice. Emanuel Lasker won $1500 for first prize, plus generous payment for travel expenses. Capablanca won $1000, compensation for expenses, and an extra payment.

== Results ==
The final results and standings:

#	Player	1	2	3	4	5	6	7	8	9	10	11	Total
1	Emanuel Lasker (Germany)	xx	½0	1½	½1	11	11	11	½1	½1	½1	11	16
2	José Raúl Capablanca (Cuba)	½1	xx	½½	½½	01	½1	11	11	1½	½1	½1	14½
3	Alexander Alekhine (Soviet Union)	0½	½½	xx	½½	10	1½	½½	½½	11	½½	11	12
4	Frank Marshall (United States)	½0	½½	½½	xx	½1	0½	01	½0	½1	1½	11	11
5	Richard Réti (Czechoslovakia)	00	10	01	½0	xx	½½	01	11	10	10	11	10½
6	Géza Maróczy (Hungary)	00	½0	0½	1½	½½	xx	01	½½	11	½1	10	10
7	Efim Bogoljubow (Soviet Union)	00	00	½½	10	10	10	xx	01	11	½1	01	9½
8	Savielly Tartakower (Poland)	½0	00	½½	½1	00	½½	10	xx	10	½0	½1	8
9	Fred Yates (England)	½0	0½	00	½0	01	00	00	01	xx	11	½1	7
10	Edward Lasker (United States)	½0	½0	½½	0½	01	½0	½0	½1	00	xx	0½	6½
11	Dawid Janowski (France)	00	½0	00	00	00	01	10	½0	½0	1½	xx	5

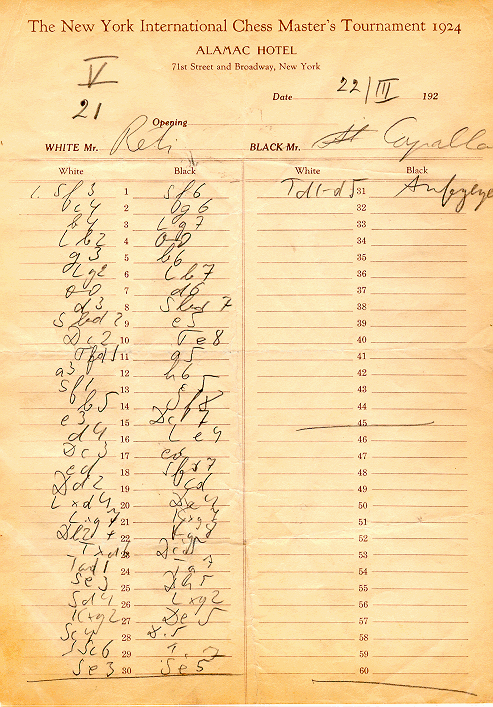
Scoresheet of Reti-Capablanca game

== Notable games ==
Reti's win against Capablanca, using an unconventional opening, was Capablanca's first defeat in a tournament or match game since 1916.
