= Emanuel Lasker =

German chess player (1868–1941)

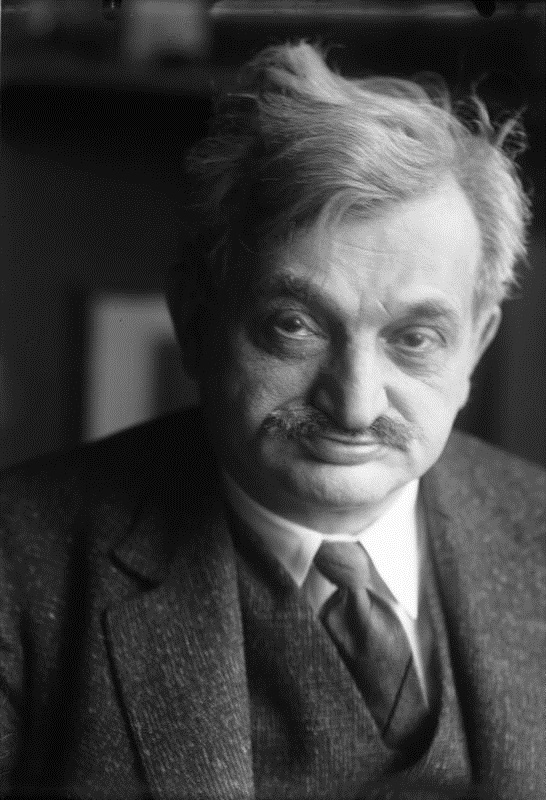
- Lasker in 1929

Personal information
- Born: December 24, 1868 Berlinchen, Kingdom of Prussia, North German Confederation
- Died: January 11, 1941 (aged 72) New York City, United States

Chess career
- Country: Germany
- World Champion: 1894–1921

Emanuel Lasker (German pronunciation: [eˈmaːnuɛl ˈlaskɐ]; December 24, 1868 – January 11, 1941) was a German chess player, mathematician, and philosopher. He was the second World Chess Champion, holding the title for 27 years, from 1894 to 1921, the longest reign of any officially recognised World Chess Champion, winning 6 World Chess Championships. In his prime, Lasker was one of the most dominant champions.

His contemporaries used to say that Lasker used a "psychological" approach to the game, and even that he sometimes deliberately played inferior moves to confuse opponents. Recent analysis, however, indicates that he was ahead of his time and used a more flexible approach than his contemporaries, which mystified many of them. Lasker knew contemporary analyses of openings well but disagreed with many of them. He published chess magazines and five chess books, but later players and commentators found it difficult to draw lessons from his methods.

Lasker made contributions to the development of other games. He was a first-class contract bridge player and wrote about bridge, Go, and his own invention, Lasca. His books about games presented a problem that is still considered notable in the mathematical analysis of card games. Lasker was a research mathematician who was known for his contributions to commutative algebra, which included proving the primary decomposition of the ideals of polynomial rings. In addition to his better-known works, he also produced philosophical writings and co-authored a drama, both of which received limited contemporary attention.

== Life and career ==
=== Early years 1868–1894 ===
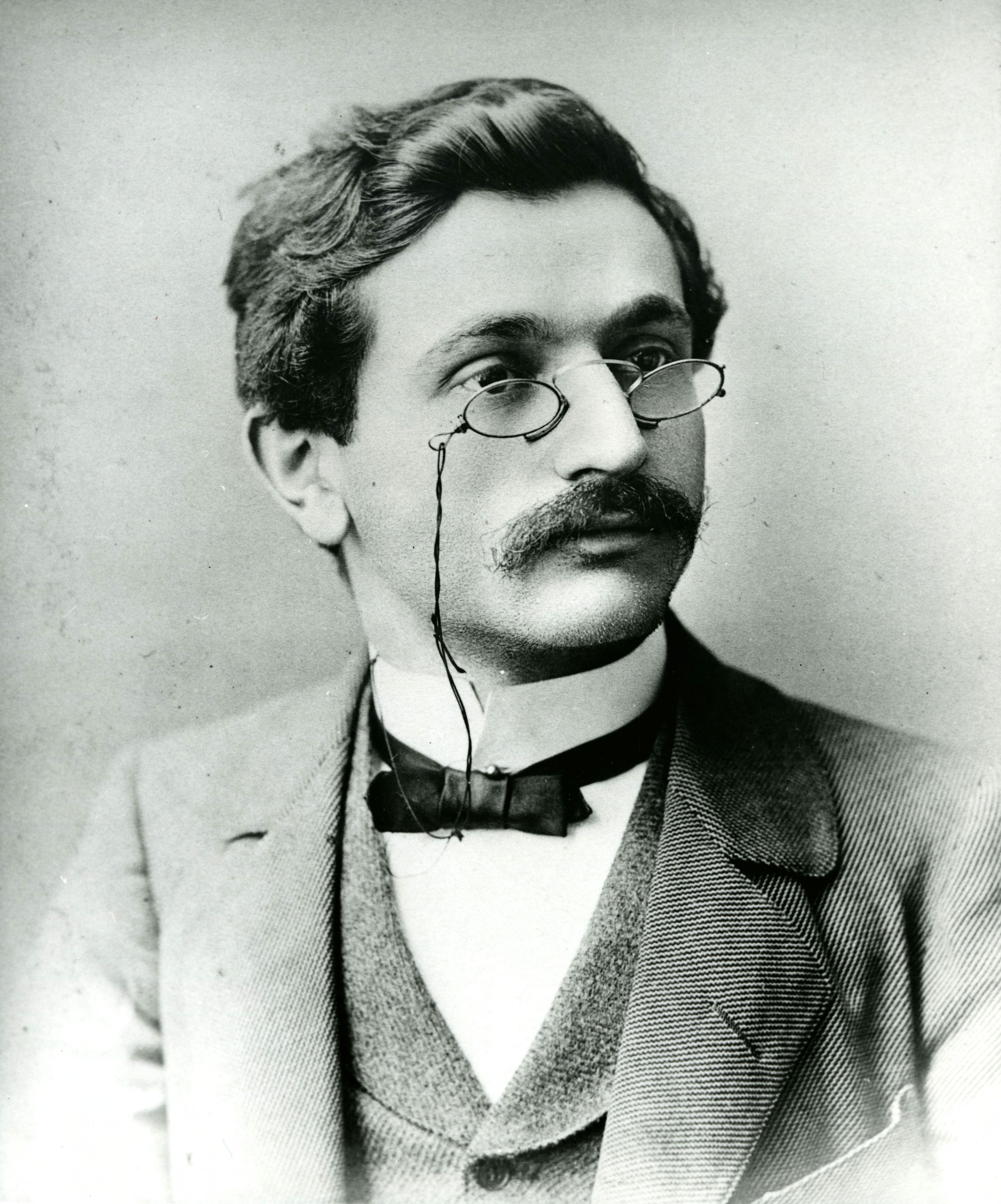
Lasker as a young man

Emanuel Lasker was born on December 24, 1868, at Berlinchen in Neumark (now Barlinek in Poland), the son of a Jewish cantor. At the age of eleven he was sent to study mathematics in Berlin, where he lived with his brother Berthold, eight years his senior, who taught him how to play chess. Berthold was among the world's top ten players in the early 1890s. To supplement their income, Emanuel played chess and card games for small stakes, especially at the Café Kaiserhof.

Lasker won the Café Kaiserhof's annual Winter tournament 1888/89 and the Hauptturnier A ("second division" tournament) at the sixth DSB Congress (German Chess Federation's congress), held in Breslau. Winning the Hauptturnier earned Lasker the title of "master". The candidates were divided into two groups of ten. The top four in each group competed in a final. Lasker won his section, with 2½ points more than his nearest rival. However, scores were reset to 0 for the final. With two rounds to go, Lasker trailed the leader, Viennese amateur von Feierfeil, by 1½ points. Lasker won both of his final games, while von Feierfeil lost in the penultimate round (being mated in 121 moves after the position was reconstructed incorrectly following an adjournment) and drew in the last round. The two players were now tied. Lasker won a playoff and garnered the master title. This enabled him to play in master-level tournaments and thus launched his chess career.

Lasker finished second in an international tournament at Amsterdam, ahead of Mason and Gunsberg. In spring 1892, he won two tournaments in London, the second and stronger of these without losing a game. At New York City in 1893, he won all thirteen games, one of the few times in chess history that a player has achieved a perfect score in a significant tournament.

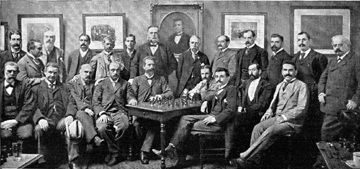
The players and tournament officials at the New York 1893 tournament

His record in matches was equally impressive: At Berlin in 1890 he drew a short playoff match against his brother Berthold and won all his other matches from 1889 to 1893, mostly against top-class opponents: Curt von Bardeleben (1889), Jacques Mieses (1889), Henry Edward Bird (1890), Berthold Englisch (1890), Joseph Henry Blackburne (1892), Jackson Showalter (1892–93) and Celso Golmayo Zúpide (1893).

In 1892 Lasker founded the first of his chess magazines, The London Chess Fortnightly, which was published from August 15, 1892, to July 30, 1893. In the second quarter of 1893, there was a gap of ten weeks between issues, allegedly because of problems with the printer. Shortly after its last issue, Lasker traveled to the US, where he spent the next two years.

Lasker challenged Siegbert Tarrasch, who had won three consecutive strong international tournaments (Breslau 1889, Manchester 1890, and Dresden 1892), to a match. Tarrasch declined, stating that Lasker should first prove his mettle by attempting to win one or two major international events.

=== Chess competition 1894–1918 ===
==== Matches against Steinitz ====
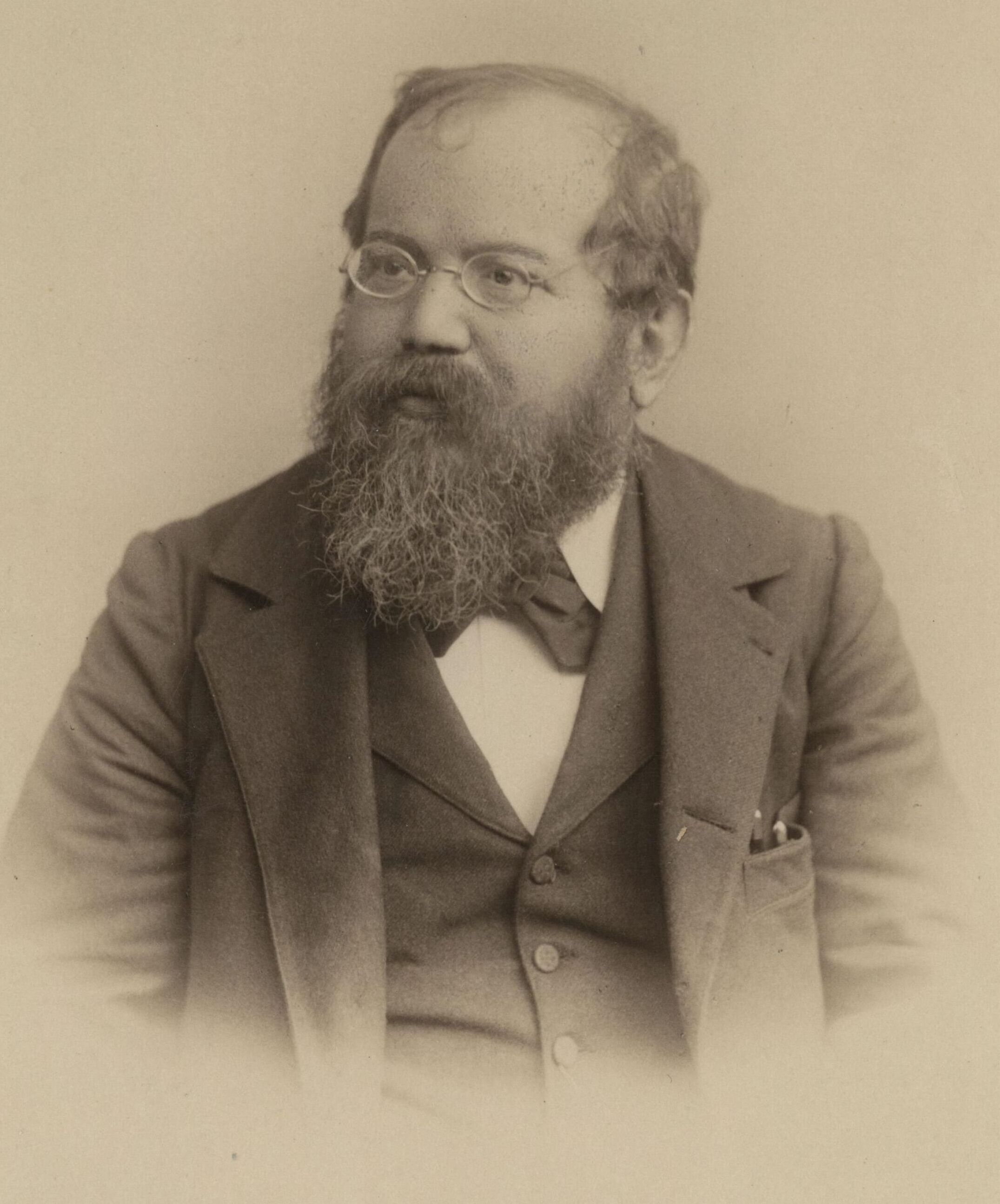
Wilhelm Steinitz, whom Lasker beat in World Championship matches in 1894 and 1896

Rebuffed by Tarrasch, Lasker challenged the reigning World Champion, Wilhelm Steinitz, to a match for the title. Initially Lasker wanted to play for US$5,000 a side, and a match was agreed to at stakes of $3,000 a side, but Steinitz agreed to a series of reductions when Lasker found it difficult to raise the money. The final figure was $2,000, which was less than for some of Steinitz's earlier matches (the final combined stake of $4,000 would be equivalent to $150,000 in 2025). The match was played in 1894 at venues in New York, Philadelphia, and Montreal. Steinitz had previously declared he would win without doubt, so it came as a shock when Lasker won the first game. Steinitz won the second game and maintained the balance through the sixth. However, Lasker won all the games from the seventh to the eleventh, and Steinitz asked for a week's rest. When the match resumed, Steinitz looked in better shape and won the 13th and 14th games. Lasker struck back in the 15th and 16th, and Steinitz did not compensate for his losses in the middle of the match. Hence Lasker won convincingly with ten wins, five losses, and four draws. On May 26, Lasker thus became the second formally recognized World Chess Champion and confirmed his title by beating Steinitz even more convincingly in their rematch in 1896–97 (ten wins, two losses, and five draws).

==== Tournament successes ====
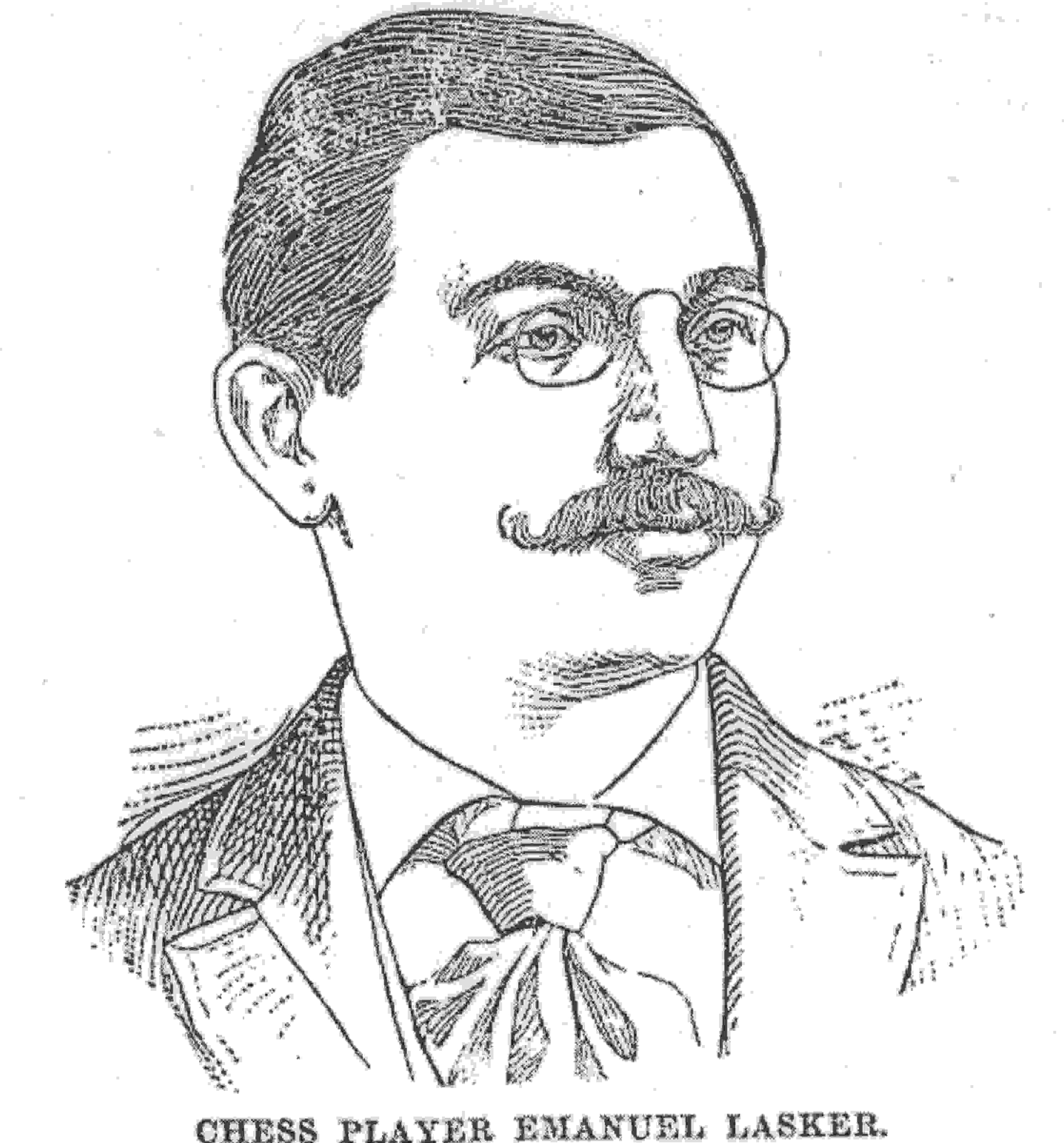
Sketch of Lasker, c. 1894

Influential players and journalists belittled the 1894 match both before and after it took place. Lasker's difficulty in getting backing may have been caused by hostile pre-match comments from Gunsberg and Leopold Hoffer, who had long been a bitter enemy of Steinitz. One of the complaints was that Lasker had never played the other two members of the top four, Siegbert Tarrasch and Mikhail Chigorin – although Tarrasch had rejected a challenge from Lasker in 1892, publicly telling him to go and win an international tournament first. After the match some commentators, notably Tarrasch, said Lasker had won mainly because Steinitz was old (58 in 1894).

Emanuel Lasker answered these criticisms by creating an even more impressive playing record. He came third at Hastings 1895 (where he may have been suffering from the after-effects of typhoid fever), behind Pillsbury and Chigorin but ahead of Tarrasch and Steinitz, and then won first prizes at very strong tournaments in St Petersburg 1895–96 (an elite, 4-player tournament, ahead of Steinitz, Pillsbury and Chigorin), Nuremberg (1896), London (1899) and Paris (1900); tied for second at Cambridge Springs 1904, and tied for first at the Chigorin Memorial in St Petersburg 1909.

Later, at St Petersburg (1914), he overcame a 1½-point deficit to finish ahead of the rising stars, Capablanca and Alexander Alekhine, who later became the next two World Champions. For decades chess writers have reported that Tsar Nicholas II of Russia conferred the title of Grandmaster of Chess upon each of the five finalists at St Petersburg 1914 (Lasker, Capablanca, Alekhine, Tarrasch and Marshall), but chess historian Edward Winter has questioned this, stating that the earliest known sources supporting this story were published in 1940 and 1942.

==== Matches against Marshall and Tarrasch ====
Lasker's match record was as impressive between his 1896–97 rematch with Steinitz and 1914: he won all but one of his normal matches, and three of those were convincing defenses of his title.

In 1906 Lasker and Géza Maróczy agreed to terms for a World Championship, but the arrangements could not be finalised, and the match never took place.

Lasker's first world championship match since 1897 was against Frank Marshall in the World Chess Championship 1907. Despite his aggressive style, Marshall could not win a single game, losing eight and drawing seven (final score: 11½–3½).

Lasker then played Tarrasch in the World Chess Championship 1908, first at Düsseldorf then at Munich. Tarrasch firmly believed the game of chess was governed by a precise set of principles. For him the strength of a chess move was in its logic, not in its efficiency. Because of his stubborn principles he considered Lasker as a coffeehouse player who won his games only thanks to dubious tricks, while Lasker mocked the arrogance of Tarrasch who, in his opinion, shone more in salons than at the chessboard. At the opening ceremony, Tarrasch refused to talk to Lasker, only saying: "Mr. Lasker, I have only three words to say to you: check and mate!"

Tarrasch vs. Lasker,
World Championship 1908

Position: e1 white rook, a1 white rook, h2 white pawn, g2 white pawn, f2 white king, c2 white pawn, a2 white pawn, b3 white pawn, e4 white pawn, f5 white knight, f6 black pawn, d6 black pawn, c6 black pawn, h7 black pawn, e7 black bishop, d7 black queen, c7 black pawn, a7 white queen, h8 black king, e8 black rook, d8 black rook

Position after 19.Qxa7

Lasker gave a brilliant answer on the chessboard, winning four of the first five games, and playing a type of chess Tarrasch could not understand. For example, in the second game after 19 moves arose a situation (diagram) in which Lasker was a pawn down, with a bad bishop and doubled pawns and queen. At this point it appeared Tarrasch was winning, but 20 moves later he was forced to resign. Lasker eventually won by 10½–5½ (eight wins, five draws, and three losses). Tarrasch claimed the wet weather was the cause of his defeat.

==== Matches against Janowski ====
In 1909 Lasker drew a short match (two wins, two losses) against Dawid Janowski, an all-out attacking Polish expatriate. Several months later they played a longer match in Paris, and chess historians still debate whether this was for the World Chess Championship. Understanding Janowski's style, Lasker chose to defend solidly so that Janowski unleashed his attacks too soon and left himself vulnerable. Lasker easily won the match 8–2 (seven wins, two draws, one loss). This victory was convincing for everyone but Janowski, who asked for a revenge match. Lasker accepted and they played a World Chess Championship match in Berlin in November–December 1910. Lasker crushed his opponent, winning 9½–1½ (eight wins, three draws, no losses). Janowski did not understand Lasker's moves, and after his first three losses he declared to Edward Lasker, "Your homonym plays so stupidly that I cannot even look at the chessboard when he thinks. I am afraid I will not do anything good in this match."

==== Match against Schlechter ====
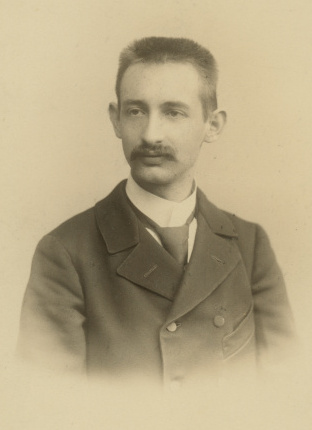
Schlechter would have taken Lasker's world title if he had won or drawn the last game of their 1910 match.

Between his two matches against Janowski, Lasker arranged another World Chess Championship in January–February 1910 against Carl Schlechter. Schlechter was a modest gentleman, who was generally unlikely to win the major chess tournaments by his peaceful inclination, his lack of aggressiveness and his willingness to accept most draw offers from his opponents (about 80% of his games finished by a draw).

At the beginning, Lasker tried to attack but Schlechter had no difficulty defending, so that the first four games finished in draws. In the fifth game Lasker had a big advantage, but committed a blunder that cost him the game. Hence at the middle of the match Schlechter was one point ahead. The next four games were drawn, despite fierce play from both players. In the sixth Schlechter managed to draw a game being a pawn down. In the seventh Lasker nearly lost because of a beautiful exchange sacrifice from Schlechter. In the ninth only a blunder from Lasker allowed Schlechter to draw a lost ending. The score before the last game was thus 5–4 for Schlechter. In the tenth game Schlechter tried to win tactically and took a big advantage, but he missed a clear win at the 35th move, continued to take increasing risks and finished by losing. Hence the match was a draw and Lasker remained World Champion.

It has been speculated that Schlechter played unusually risky chess in the tenth game because the terms of the match required him to win by a margin of two games. But according to Isaak and Vladimir Linder, this was unlikely. The match was originally to be a 30-game affair and Schlechter would have to win by two games. But they note that according to the Austrian chess historian Michael Ehn, Lasker agreed to forgo the plus two provision in view of the match being subsequently reduced to only 10 games. For proof Ehn quoted Schlechter's comment printed in Allgemeine Sportzeitung (ASZ) of December 9, 1909 "There will be ten games in all. The winner on points will receive the title of world champion. If the points are equal, the decision will be made by the arbiter."

==== Abandoned challenges ====
In 1911 Lasker received a challenge for a world title match against the rising star José Raúl Capablanca. Lasker was unwilling to play the traditional "first to win ten games" type of match in the semi-tropical conditions of Havana, especially as drawn games were becoming more frequent and the match might last for over six months. He therefore made a counter-proposal: if neither player had a lead of at least two games by the end of the match, it should be considered a draw; the match should be limited to the best of thirty games, counting draws; except that if either player won six games and led by at least two games before thirty games were completed, he should be declared the winner; the champion should decide the venue and stakes, and should have the exclusive right to publish the games; the challenger should deposit a forfeit of US$2,000 (equivalent to over $250,000 in 2020 values); the time limit should be twelve moves per hour; play should be limited to two sessions of 2½ hours each per day, five days a week. Capablanca objected to the time limit, the short playing times, the thirty-game limit, and especially the requirement that he must win by two games to claim the title, which he regarded as unfair. Lasker took offence at the terms in which Capablanca criticized the two-game lead condition and broke off negotiations, and until 1914 Lasker and Capablanca were not on speaking terms. However, at the 1914 St. Petersburg tournament, Capablanca proposed a set of rules for the conduct of World Championship matches, which were accepted by all the leading players, including Lasker.

Late in 1912 Lasker entered into negotiations for a world title match with Akiba Rubinstein, whose tournament record for the previous few years had been on a par with Lasker's and a little ahead of Capablanca's. The two players agreed to play a match if Rubinstein could raise the funds, but Rubinstein had few rich friends to back him and the match was never played. This situation demonstrated some of the flaws inherent in the championship system then being used. The start of World War I in summer 1914 put an end to hopes that Lasker would play either Rubinstein or Capablanca for the World Championship in the near future. Throughout World War I (1914–1918) Lasker played in only two serious chess events. He convincingly won (5½−½) a non-title match against Tarrasch in 1916. In September–October 1918, shortly before the armistice, he won a quadrangular (four-player) tournament, half a point ahead of Rubinstein.

=== Academic activities 1894–1918 ===
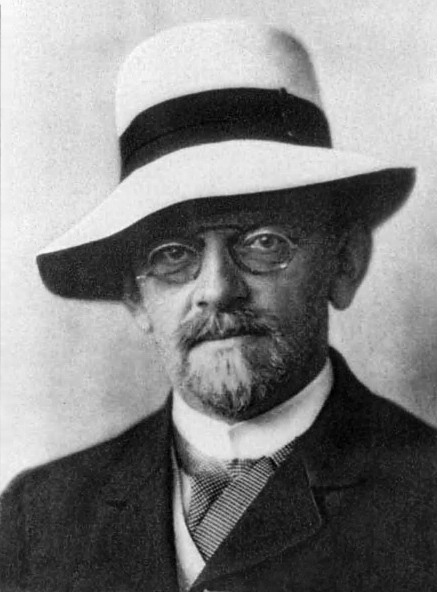
David Hilbert encouraged Lasker to obtain a PhD in mathematics.

Despite his superb playing results, chess was not Lasker's only interest. His parents recognized his intellectual talents, especially for mathematics, and sent the adolescent Emanuel to study in Berlin (where he found he also had a talent for chess). Lasker gained his abitur (high school graduation certificate) at Landsberg an der Warthe, now a Polish town named Gorzów Wielkopolski but then part of Prussia. He then studied mathematics and philosophy at the universities in Berlin, Göttingen (where David Hilbert was one of his doctoral advisors) and Heidelberg.

In 1895 he published two mathematical articles in Nature. On the advice of David Hilbert he registered for doctoral studies at Erlangen during 1900–1902. In 1901 he presented his doctoral thesis Über Reihen auf der Convergenzgrenze ("On Series at Convergence Boundaries") at Erlangen and in the same year it was published by the Royal Society. He was awarded a doctorate in mathematics in 1902. His most significant mathematical article, published in 1905, established a theorem on primary decompositions of which Emmy Noether developed a more generalized form, which is now regarded as of fundamental importance to abstract algebra and algebraic geometry.

Lasker held short-term positions as a mathematics lecturer at Tulane University in New Orleans (1893) and Victoria University in Manchester (1901; Victoria University was one of the "parents" of the current University of Manchester). However, he was unable to secure a longer-term position, and pursued his scholarly interests independently.

In 1906 Lasker published a booklet titled Kampf (Struggle), in which he attempted to create a general theory of all competitive activities, including chess, business and war. He produced two other books which are generally categorized as philosophy, Das Begreifen der Welt (Comprehending the World; 1913) and Die Philosophie des Unvollendbar (sic; The Philosophy of the Unattainable; 1918).

=== Other activities 1894–1918 ===
In 1896–97 Lasker published his book Common Sense in Chess, based on lectures he had given in London in 1895.

Rice Gambit

Position: a8 black rook, b8 black knight, c8 black bishop, d8 black queen, e8 black king, h8 black rook, a7 black pawn, b7 black pawn, c7 black pawn, f7 black pawn, h7 black pawn, d6 black bishop, f6 black knight, d5 white pawn, e5 white knight, c4 white bishop, f4 black pawn, g4 black pawn, h4 white pawn, a2 white pawn, b2 white pawn, c2 white pawn, d2 white pawn, g2 white pawn, a1 white rook, b1 white knight, c1 white bishop, d1 white queen, f1 white rook, g1 white king

Position after 1.e4 e5 2.f4 exf4 3.Nf3 g5 4.h4 g4 5.Ne5 Nf6 6.Bc4 d5 7.exd5 Bd6 8.0-0
White sacrifices the knight on e5 in order to get his king to safety and enable a rook to join the attack against the under-developed black position.

In 1903, Lasker played in Ostend against Mikhail Chigorin, a six-game match that was sponsored by the wealthy lawyer and industrialist Isaac Rice in order to test the Rice Gambit. Lasker narrowly lost the match. Three years later Lasker became secretary of the Rice Gambit Association, founded by Rice in order to promote the Rice Gambit, and in 1907 Lasker quoted with approval Rice's views on the convergence of chess and military strategy.

In November 1904, Lasker founded Lasker's Chess Magazine, which ran until 1909.

Beginning in 1910, he wrote a weekly chess column for the New York Evening Post, for which he was Chess Editor.

Emanuel Lasker became interested in the strategy game Go after being introduced to it by his namesake Edward Lasker, probably in 1907 or 1908 (Edward Lasker wrote a successful book Go and Go-Moku in 1934). He and Edward played Go together while Edward was helping him prepare for his 1908 match with Tarrasch. He kept his interest in Go for the rest of his life, becoming one of the strongest players in Germany and Europe and contributing occasionally to the magazine Deutsche Go-Zeitung. It is alleged that he once said "Had I discovered Go sooner, I would probably have never become world chess champion".

At the age of 42, in July 1911, Lasker married Martha Cohn (née Bamberger), a rich widow who was a year older than Lasker and already a grandmother. They lived in Berlin. Martha Cohn wrote popular stories under the pseudonym "L. Marco".

During World War I, Lasker invested all of his savings in German war bonds, which lost nearly their entire value with the wartime and post-war inflation. During the war, he wrote a pamphlet which claimed that civilization would be in danger if Germany lost the war.

=== Match against Capablanca ===
In January 1920 Lasker and José Raúl Capablanca signed an agreement to play a World Championship match in 1921, noting that Capablanca was not free to play in 1920. Because of the delay, Lasker insisted on a final clause that allowed him to play anyone else for the championship in 1920, that nullified the contract with Capablanca if Lasker lost a title match in 1920, and that stipulated that if Lasker resigned the title Capablanca should become World Champion. Lasker had previously included in his agreement before World War I to play Akiba Rubinstein for the title a similar clause that if he resigned the title, it should become Rubinstein's.

A report in the American Chess Bulletin (July–August 1920 issue) said that Lasker had resigned the world title in favor of Capablanca because the conditions of the match were unpopular in the chess world. The American Chess Bulletin speculated that the conditions were not sufficiently unpopular to warrant resignation of the title, and that Lasker's real concern was that there was not enough financial backing to justify his devoting nine months to the match. When Lasker resigned the title in favor of Capablanca he was unaware that enthusiasts in Havana had just raised $20,000 to fund the match provided it was played there. When Capablanca learned of Lasker's resignation he went to the Netherlands, where Lasker was living at the time, to inform him that Havana would finance the match. In August 1920 Lasker agreed to play in Havana, but insisted that he was the challenger as Capablanca was now the champion. Capablanca signed an agreement that accepted this point, and soon afterwards published a letter confirming this. Lasker also stated that, if he beat Capablanca, he would resign the title so that younger masters could compete for it.

The match was played in March–April 1921. After four draws, the fifth game saw Lasker blunder with Black in an equal ending. Capablanca's solid style allowed him to easily draw the next four games, without taking any risks. In the tenth game, Lasker as White played a position with an Isolated Queen Pawn but failed to create the necessary activity and Capablanca reached a superior ending, which he duly won. The eleventh and fourteenth games were also won by Capablanca, and Lasker resigned the match.

Reuben Fine and Harry Golombek attributed this to Lasker's being in mysteriously poor form. On the other hand, Vladimir Kramnik thought that Lasker played quite well and the match was an "even and fascinating fight" until Lasker blundered in the last game, and explained that Capablanca was 20 years younger, a slightly stronger player, and had more recent competitive practice. In a post mortem of the match, Lasker said the Habanero weather severely impaired his chess ability, and his physical health declined. Capablance challenged his assertion, proclaiming "two or three days after the match was over, Dr. Lasker sailed for Europe looking very well and cheerful, far, very far, from the sick man one would imagine after reading his book."

=== European life and travels ===
Lasker was in his early 50s when he lost the world championship to Capablanca, and he retired from serious match play afterwards; his only other match was a short exhibition against Frank James Marshall in 1940, which was never completed due to Lasker's illness, and death a few months later. After winning the Moravská Ostrava 1923 chess tournament (without a single loss) and the New York 1924 chess tournament (1½ points ahead of Capablanca) and finishing second at Moscow in 1925 (1½ points behind Efim Bogoljubow, ½ point ahead of Capablanca), he effectively retired from serious chess.

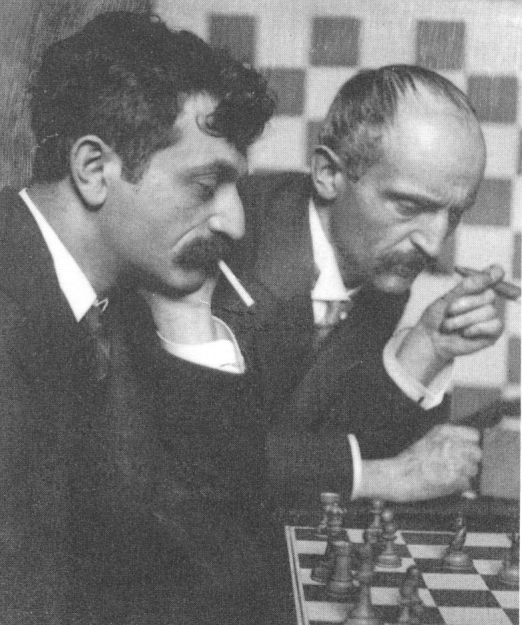
Emanuel Lasker (left) and his elder brother Berthold in 1907

During the Moscow 1925 chess tournament, Lasker received a telegram informing him that the drama written by himself and his brother Berthold, Vom Menschen die Geschichte ("History of Mankind"), had been accepted for performance at the Lessing theatre in Berlin. Lasker was so distracted by this news that he lost badly to Carlos Torre the same day. The play, however, was not a success.

In 1926, Lasker wrote Lehrbuch des Schachspiels, which he re-wrote in English in 1927 as Lasker's Manual of Chess. He also wrote books on other games of mental skill: Encyclopedia of Games (1929) and Das verständige Kartenspiel (means "Sensible Card Play"; 1929; English translation in the same year), both of which posed a problem in the mathematical analysis of card games; Brettspiele der Völker ("Board Games of the Nations"; 1931), which includes 30 pages about Go and a section about a game he had invented in 1911, Lasca.

In 1930, Lasker was a special correspondent for Dutch and German newspapers reporting on the Culbertson-Buller bridge match during which he became a registered teacher of the Culbertson system. He became an expert bridge player, representing Germany at international events in the early 1930s, and wrote Das Bridgespiel ("The Game of Bridge") in 1931.

In October 1928 Emanuel Lasker's brother Berthold died.

In spring 1933 Adolf Hitler started a campaign of discrimination and intimidation against Jews, depriving them of their property and citizenship. Lasker and his wife Martha, who were both Jewish, were forced to leave Germany in the same year. After a short stay in England, in 1935 they were invited to live in the USSR by Nikolai Krylenko, the Soviet Sports Minister and an enthusiastic supporter of chess. In the USSR, Lasker renounced his German citizenship and received Soviet citizenship. He took permanent residence in Moscow, and was given a post at Moscow's Institute for Mathematics and a post of trainer of the USSR national team. Lasker returned to competitive chess to make some money, finishing fifth in Zürich 1934 and third in Moscow 1935 (undefeated, ½ point behind Mikhail Botvinnik and Salo Flohr; ahead of Capablanca, Rudolf Spielmann and several Soviet masters), sixth in Moscow 1936 and equal seventh in Nottingham 1936. His performance in Moscow 1935 at age 66 was hailed as "a biological miracle".

=== Settling in the United States ===
In August 1937, Martha and Emanuel Lasker decided to leave the Soviet Union, and they moved, via the Netherlands, to the United States (first Chicago, next New York) in October 1937. They were visiting Martha's daughter, but they may also have been motivated by political upheaval in the Soviet Union. In the United States Lasker tried to support himself by giving chess and bridge lectures and exhibitions, as he was now too old for serious competition. In 1940 he published his last book, The Community of the Future, in which he proposed solutions for serious political problems, including anti-Semitism and unemployment.

== Assessment ==
=== Playing strength and style ===
Lasker was considered to have a "psychological" method of play in which he considered the subjective qualities of his opponent, in addition to the objective requirements of his position on the board. Richard Réti published a lengthy analysis of Lasker's play in which he concluded that Lasker deliberately played inferior moves that he knew would make his opponent uncomfortable. W. H. K. Pollock commented, "It is no easy matter to reply correctly to Lasker's bad moves."

Lasker himself denied the claim that he deliberately played bad moves, and most modern writers agree. According to Grandmaster Andrew Soltis and International Master John L. Watson, the features that made his play mysterious to contemporaries now appear regularly in modern play: sacrifices to gain positional advantage; playing the "practical" move rather than trying to find the best move; counterattacking and complicating the game before a disadvantage became serious. Former World Champion Vladimir Kramnik said, "He realized that different types of advantage could be interchangeable: tactical edge could be converted into strategic advantage and vice versa", which mystified contemporaries who were just becoming used to the theories of Steinitz as codified by Siegbert Tarrasch.

Max Euwe opined that the real reason behind Lasker's success was his "exceptional defensive technique" and that "almost all there is to say about defensive chess can be demonstrated by examples from the games of Steinitz and Lasker", the former exemplifying passive defence and the latter an active defence.

The famous win against José Raúl Capablanca at St. Petersburg in 1914, which Lasker needed in order to retain any chance of catching up with Capablanca, is sometimes offered as evidence of his "psychological" approach. Reuben Fine describes Lasker's choice of opening, the Exchange Variation of the Ruy Lopez, as "innocuous but psychologically potent". Luděk Pachman writes that Lasker's choice presented his opponent with a dilemma: with only a ½ point lead, Capablanca would have wanted to play safe; but the Exchange Variation's pawn structure gives White an endgame advantage, and Black must use his bishop pair aggressively in the middlegame to nullify this. However, an analysis of Lasker's use of this variation throughout his career concludes that he had excellent results with it as White against top-class opponents, and sometimes used it in "must-win" situations. In Kramnik's opinion, Lasker's play in this game demonstrated deep positional understanding, rather than psychology.

Fine reckoned Lasker paid little attention to the openings, while Capablanca thought that Lasker knew the openings very well but disagreed with a lot of contemporary opening analysis. Before the 1894 world title match, Lasker studied the openings thoroughly, especially Steinitz's favorite lines. In Capablanca's opinion, no player surpassed Lasker in the ability to assess a position quickly and accurately, in terms of who had the better prospects of winning and what strategy each side should adopt. Capablanca also wrote that Lasker was so adaptable that he played in no definite style, and that he was both a tenacious defender and a very efficient finisher of his own attacks.

Lasker followed Steinitz's principles, and both demonstrated a completely different chess paradigm than the "romantic" mentality before them. Thanks to Steinitz and Lasker, positional players gradually became common (Tarrasch, Schlechter, and Rubinstein stand out.) But, while Steinitz created a new school of chess thought, Lasker's talents were far harder for the masses to grasp; hence there was no Lasker school.

In addition to his enormous chess skill, Lasker was said to have an excellent competitive temperament: his rival Siegbert Tarrasch once said, "Lasker occasionally loses a game, but he never loses his head." Lasker enjoyed the need to adapt to varying styles and to the shifting fortunes of tournaments. Although very strong in matches, he was even stronger in tournaments. For over 20 years, he always finished ahead of the younger Capablanca: at St. Petersburg 1914, New York 1924, Moscow 1925, and Moscow 1935. Only in 1936 (15 years after their match), when Lasker was 67, did Capablanca finish ahead of him.

In 1964, Chessworld magazine published an article in which future World Champion Bobby Fischer listed the ten greatest players in history. Fischer did not include Lasker in the list, deriding him as a "coffee-house player [who] knew nothing about openings and didn't understand positional chess". In a poll of the world's leading players taken some time after Fischer's list appeared, Tal, Korchnoi, and Robert Byrne all said that Lasker was the greatest player ever. Both Pal Benko and Byrne stated that Fischer later reconsidered and said that Lasker was a great player.

Statistical ranking systems place Lasker high among the greatest players of all time. The book Warriors of the Mind places him sixth, behind Garry Kasparov, Anatoly Karpov, Fischer, Mikhail Botvinnik and Capablanca. In his 1978 book The Rating of Chessplayers, Past and Present, Arpad Elo gave retrospective ratings to players based on their performance over the best five-year span of their career. He concluded that Lasker was the joint second strongest player of those surveyed (tied with Botvinnik and behind Capablanca). The most up-to-date system, Chessmetrics, is rather sensitive to the length of the periods being compared, and ranks Lasker between fifth and second strongest of all time for peak periods ranging in length from one to twenty years. Its author, the statistician Jeff Sonas, concluded that only Kasparov and Karpov surpassed Lasker's long-term dominance of the game. By Chessmetrics' reckoning, Lasker was the number 1 player in 292 different months—a total of over 24 years. His first No. 1 rank was in June 1890, and his last in December 1926—a span of 36½ years. Chessmetrics also considers him the strongest 67-year-old in history: in December 1935, at age 67 years and 0 months, his rating was 2691 (number 7 in the world), well above second-place Viktor Korchnoi's rating at that age (2660, number 39 in the world, in March 1998).

=== Influence on chess ===
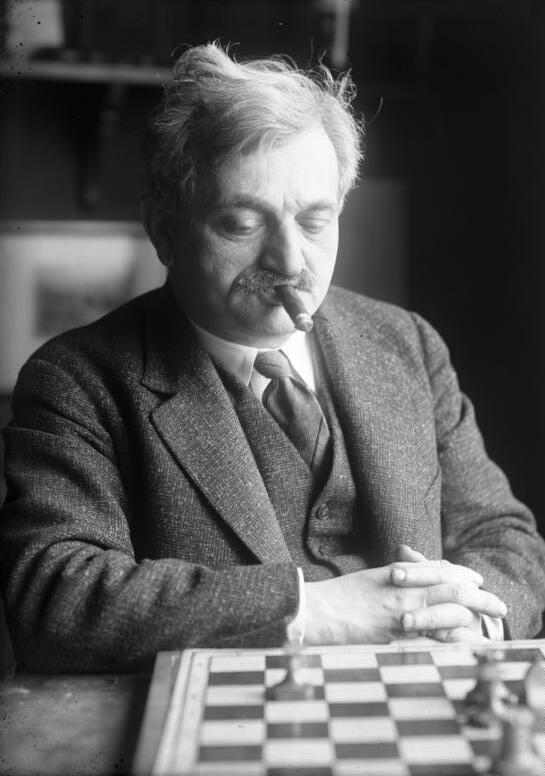
Lasker at home in Berlin, in 1933

Lasker founded no school of players who played in a similar style. Max Euwe, World Champion 1935–1937 and a prolific writer of chess manuals, who had a lifetime 0–3 score against Lasker, said, "It is not possible to learn much from him. One can only stand and wonder." Lasker's pragmatic, combative approach had a great influence on Soviet players like Mikhail Tal and Viktor Korchnoi.

There are several "Lasker Variations" in the chess openings, including Lasker's Defense to the Queen's Gambit, Lasker's Defense to the Evans Gambit (which effectively ended the use of this gambit in tournament play until a revival in the 1990s), and the Lasker Variation in the McCutcheon Variation of the French Defense.

Lasker was shocked by the poverty in which Wilhelm Steinitz died and did not intend to die in similar circumstances. He became notorious for demanding high fees for playing matches and tournaments, and he argued that players should own the copyright to their games rather than let publishers get all the profits. These demands initially angered editors and other players, but helped to pave the way for the rise of full-time chess professionals who earn most of their living from playing, writing and teaching. Copyright in chess games had been contentious at least as far back as the mid-1840s, and Steinitz and Lasker vigorously asserted that players should own the copyright and wrote copyright clauses into their match contracts. However, Lasker's demands that challengers should raise large purses prevented or delayed some eagerly awaited World Championship matches—for example Frank James Marshall challenged him in 1904 to a match for the World Championship but could not raise the stakes demanded by Lasker until 1907. This problem continued throughout the reign of his successor, Capablanca.

Some of the controversial conditions that Lasker insisted on for championship matches led Capablanca to attempt twice (1914 and 1922) to publish rules for such matches, to which other top players readily agreed.

=== Work in other fields ===
In a 1905 article on commutative algebra, Lasker introduced the theory of primary decomposition of ideals, which has influence in the theory of Noetherian rings. Primary decomposition rings are called "Laskerian rings" in his honor.

His attempt to create a general theory of all competitive activities were followed by more consistent efforts from von Neumann on game theory, and his later writings about card games presented a significant issue in the mathematical analysis of card games. According to mathematician R. J. Nowakowski, he "came close to a complete theory of impartial games."

However, his dramatic and philosophical works have never been highly regarded.

== Death ==
Lasker died of a kidney infection in New York on January 11, 1941, at the age of 72, as a charity patient at the Mount Sinai Hospital. His funeral service was held at the Riverside Memorial Chapel, and he was buried at historic Beth Olam Cemetery, Queens, New York.

== Personal life, family and friends ==
His wife Martha and his sister, Mrs. Lotta Hirschberg, survived him.

Poet Else Lasker-Schüler was his sister-in-law.

Edward Lasker, born in Kempen (Kępno), Greater Poland (then Prussia), the German-American chess master, engineer, and author, claimed that he was distantly related to Emanuel Lasker. They both played in the great New York 1924 chess tournament.

Lasker was a good friend of Albert Einstein, who wrote the introduction to the posthumous biography, Emanuel Lasker: The Life of a Chess Master, by Jacques Hannak (1952). In the preface Einstein expressed satisfaction for having met Lasker:

Emanuel Lasker was undoubtedly one of the most interesting people I came to know in my later years. We must be thankful to those who have penned the story of his life for this and succeeding generations. For there are few men who have had a warm interest in all the great human problems and at the same time kept their personality so uniquely independent.

== Publications ==
=== Chess ===
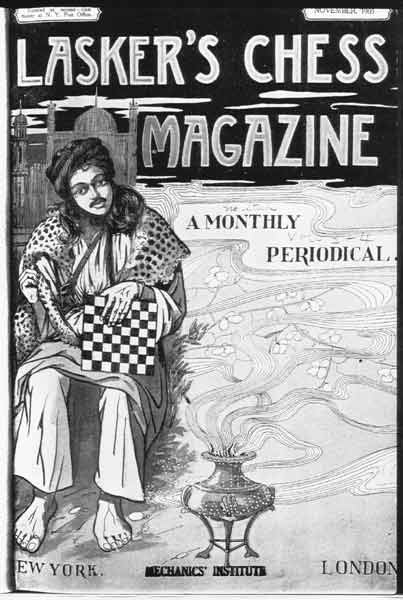
Lasker's Chess Magazine cover from November 1906

- The London Chess Fortnightly, 1892–93.
- Lasker, Emanuel (1965) [1896]. Common Sense in Chess. Dover. ISBN 978-0-486-21440-5. ["The following is an abstract of Twelve Lectures given before an audience of London chess players in the spring of 1895" - author's preface].
- Lasker's How to Play Chess: An Elementary Text Book for Beginners, Which Teaches Chess By a New, Easy and Comprehensive Method, 1900.
- Lasker's Chess Magazine, OCLC 5002324, 1904–1907.
- Lasker, Emanuel, ed. (1910). The International Chess Congress, St. Petersburg, 1909. Press of Emanuel Lasker.
- Lasker's Manual of Chess, 1925, is as famous in chess circles for its philosophical tone as for its content.
- Lehrbuch des Schachspiels, 1926 – English version Lasker's Manual of Chess published in 1927.
- Lasker, Emanuel (1988) [1934]. Lasker's Chess Primer. Portman Press. ISBN 978-0-7134-6241-8.

=== Other games ===
- Encyclopedia of Games Vol. I, Card Strategy, New York 1929, urn:nbn:de:hbz:5:1-331264.
- Das verständige Kartenspiel (Sensible Card Play), Berlin 1929, urn:nbn:de:hbz:5:1-331248 – not only a translation of Encyclopedia of Games.
- Brettspiele der Völker (Board Games of the Nations), Berlin 1931, urn:nbn:at:at-ubms:3-1736 – includes sections about Go and Lasca.
- Das Bridgespiel ("The Game of Bridge"), 1931.

=== Mathematics ===
- Lasker, Emanuel (August 1895). "Metrical Relations of Plane Spaces of n Manifoldness". Nature. 52 (1345): 340–343. Bibcode:1895Natur..52R.340L. doi:10.1038/052340d0. S2CID 4017358.
- Lasker, Emanuel (October 1895). "About a certain Class of Curved Lines in Space of n Manifoldness". Nature. 52 (1355): 596. Bibcode:1895Natur..52..596L. doi:10.1038/052596a0. S2CID 4016031.
- Lasker, Emanuel (1901). "Über Reihen auf der Convergenzgrenze ( "On Series at Convergence Boundaries" )". Philosophical Transactions of the Royal Society A. 196 (274–286): 431–477. Bibcode:1901RSPTA.196..431L. doi:10.1098/rsta.1901.0009. – Lasker's PhD thesis.
- Lasker, E. (1905). "Zur Theorie der Moduln und Ideale". Math. Ann. 60 (1): 20–116. doi:10.1007/BF01447495. S2CID 120367750.

=== Philosophy ===
- Kampf (Struggle), 1906.
- Das Begreifen der Welt (Comprehending the World), 1913.
- Die Philosophie des Unvollendbar (sic; The Philosophy of the Unattainable), 1918.
- Vom Menschen die Geschichte ("History of Mankind"), 1925 – a play, co-written with his brother Berthold.
- The Community of the Future, 1940.

== In popular culture ==
In Michael Chabon's alternate history mystery novel, The Yiddish Policemen's Union, the murdered man, Mendel Shpilman (born during the 1960s), being a chess enthusiast, uses the name "Emanuel Lasker" as an alias. The reference is clearly understood by the protagonist, Detective Meyer Landsman, because he has also studied chess.

== Tournament results ==
The following table gives Lasker's placings and scores in tournaments. The first "Score" column gives the number of points on the total possible. In the second "Score" column, "+" indicates the number of won games, "−" the number of losses, and "=" the number of draws.

Date	Location	Place	Score		Notes
1888/89	Berlin (Café Kaiserhof)	1st	20/20	+20−0=0	
1889	Breslau "B"	1st =	12/15	+11−2;=2	Tied with von Feyerfeil and won the play-off. This was Hauptturnier A of the sixth DSB Congress, i.e. the "second-division" tournament.
1889	Amsterdam "A" tournament	2nd	6/8	+5−1=2	Behind Amos Burn; ahead of James Mason, Isidor Gunsberg and others. This was the stronger of the two Amsterdam tournaments held at that time.
1890	Berlin	1–2	6½/8	+6−1=1	Tied with his brother Berthold Lasker.
1890	Graz	3rd	4/6	+3−1=2	Behind Gyula Makovetz and Johann Hermann Bauer.
1892	London	1st	9/11	+8−1=2	Ahead of Mason and Rudolf Loman.
1892	London	1st	6½/8	+5−0=3	Ahead of Joseph Henry Blackburne, Mason, Gunsberg and Henry Edward Bird.
1893	New York City	1st	13/13	+13−0=0	Ahead of Adolf Albin, Jackson Showalter and a newcomer named Harry Nelson Pillsbury.
1895	Hastings	3rd	15½/21	+14−4=3	Behind Pillsbury and Mikhail Chigorin; ahead of Siegbert Tarrasch, Wilhelm Steinitz and the rest of a strong field.
1895/96	St. Petersburg	1st	11½/18	+8−3=7	A Quadrangular tournament; ahead of Steinitz (by two points), Pillsbury and Chigorin.
1896	Nuremberg	1st	13½/18	+12−3=3	Ahead of Géza Maróczy, Pillsbury, Tarrasch, Dawid Janowski, Steinitz and the rest of a strong field.
1899	London	1st	23½/28	+20−1=7	Ahead of Janowski, Pillsbury, Maróczy, Carl Schlechter, Blackburne, Chigorin and several other strong players.
1900	Paris	1st	14½/16	+14−1=1	Ahead of Pillsbury (by two points), Frank James Marshall, Maróczy, Burn, Chigorin and several others.
1904	Cambridge Springs	2nd =	11/15	+9−2=4	Tied with Janowski; two points behind Marshall; ahead of Georg Marco, Showalter, Schlechter, Chigorin, Jacques Mieses, Pillsbury and others.
1906	Trenton Falls	1st	5/6	+4−0=2	A Quadrangular tournament; ahead of Curt, Albert Fox and Raubitschek.
1909	St. Petersburg	1st =	14½/18	+13−2=3	Tied with Akiba Rubinstein; ahead of Oldřich Duras and Rudolf Spielmann (by 3½ points), Ossip Bernstein, Richard Teichmann and several other strong players.
1914	St. Petersburg	1st	13½/18	+10−1=7	Ahead of José Raúl Capablanca, Alexander Alekhine, Tarrasch and Marshall. This tournament had an unusual structure: there was a preliminary tournament in which eleven players played each other player once; the top five players then played a separate final tournament in which each player who made the "cut" played the other finalists twice; but their scores from the preliminary tournament were carried forward. Even the preliminary tournament would now be considered a "super-tournament". Capablanca "won" the preliminary tournament by 1½ points without losing a game, but Lasker achieved a plus score against all his opponents in the final tournament and finished with a combined score ½ point ahead of Capablanca's.
1918	Berlin	1st	4½/6	+3−0=3	Quadrangular tournament. Ahead of Rubinstein, Schlechter and Tarrasch.
1923	Moravská Ostrava	1st	10½/13	+8−0=5	Ahead of Richard Réti, Ernst Grünfeld, Alexey Selezniev, Savielly Tartakower, Max Euwe and other strong players.
1924	New York City	1st	16/20	+13−1=6	Ahead of Capablanca (by 1½ points), Alekhine, Marshall, and the rest of a very strong field.
1925	Moscow	2nd	14/20	+10−2=8	Behind Efim Bogoljubow; ahead of Capablanca, Marshall, Tartakower, Carlos Torre, other strong non-Soviet players and the leading Soviet players.
1934	Zürich	5th	10/15	+9−4=2	Behind Alekhine, Euwe, Salo Flohr and Bogoljubow; ahead of Bernstein, Aron Nimzowitsch, Gideon Ståhlberg and various others.
1935	Moscow	3rd	12½/19	+6−0=13	half a point behind Mikhail Botvinnik and Flohr; ahead of Capablanca, Spielmann, Ilya Kan, Grigory Levenfish, Andor Lilienthal, Viacheslav Ragozin and others. Emanuel Lasker was about 67 years old at the time.
1936	Moscow	6th	8/18	+3−5=10	Capablanca won.
1936	Nottingham	7–8th	8½/14	+6−3=5	Capablanca and Botvinnik tied for first place.

== Match results ==
Here are Lasker's results in matches. The first "Score" column gives the number of points on the total possible. In the second "Score" column, "+" indicates the number of won games, "−" the number of losses, and "=" the number of draws.

Date	Opponent	Result	Location	Score		Notes
1889	E.R. von Feyerfeil	Won	Breslau	1−0	+1−0=0	Play-off match
1889/90	Curt von Bardeleben	Won	Berlin	2½–1½	+2−1=1	
1889/90	Jacques Mieses	Won	Leipzig	6½–1½	+5−0=3	
1890	Berthold Lasker	Drew	Berlin	½–½	+0−0=1	Play-off match
1890	Henry Edward Bird	Won	Liverpool	8½–3½	+7−2=3	
1890	N.T. Miniati	Won	Manchester	4–1	+3−0=2	
1890	Berthold Englisch	Won	Vienna	3½–1½	+2−0=3	
1891	Francis Joseph Lee	Won	London	1½–½	+1−0=1	
1892	Joseph Henry Blackburne	Won	London	8–2	+6−0=4	
1892	Bird	Won	Newcastle upon Tyne	5–0	+5−0=0	
1892/93	Jackson Showalter	Won	Logansport and Kokomo, Indiana	7–3	+6−2=2	
1893	Celso Golmayo Zúpide	Won	Havana	2½–½	+2−0=1	
1893	Andrés Clemente Vázquez	Won	Havana	3–0	+3−0=0	
1893	A. Ponce	Won	Havana	2–0	+2−0=0	
1893	Alfred Ettlinger	Won	New York City	5–0	+5−0=0	
1894	Wilhelm Steinitz	Won	New York, Philadelphia, Montreal	12–7	+10−5=4	Won World Chess Championship
1896/97	Steinitz	Won	Moscow	12½–4½	+10−2=5	Retained World Chess Championship
1901	Dawid Janowski	Won	Manchester	1½–½	+1−0=1	
1903	Mikhail Chigorin	Lost	Brighton	2½–3½	+1−2=3	Rice Gambit-themed match
1907	Frank James Marshall	Won	New York, Philadelphia, Washington, D.C., Baltimore, Chicago, Memphis	11½–3½	+8−0=7	Retained World Chess Championship
1908	Siegbert Tarrasch	Won	Düsseldorf, Munich	10½–5½	+8−3=5	Retained World Chess Championship
1908	Abraham Speijer	Won	Amsterdam	2½–½	+2−0=1	
1909	Janowski	Drew	Paris	2–2	+2−2=0	Exhibition match
1909	Janowski	Won	Paris	8–2	+7−1=2	
1910	Carl Schlechter	Drew	Vienna−Berlin	5–5	+1−1=8	Retained World Chess Championship
1910	Janowski	Won	Berlin	9½–1½	+8−0=3	Retained World Chess Championship
1914	Ossip Bernstein	Drew	Moscow	1–1	+1−1=0	Exhibition match
1916	Tarrasch	Won	Berlin	5½–½	+5−0=1	
1921	José Raúl Capablanca	Lost	Havana	5–9	+0−4=10	Lost World Chess Championship
1940	Frank James Marshall	Unfinished due to Lasker's illness and death	New York	½–1½	+0−1=1	exhibition match

== Notable games ==
- Lasker vs. Johann Hermann Bauer, Amsterdam 1889. Although this was not the earliest-known game with a successful two-bishops sacrifice, this combination is now known as a "Lasker–Bauer combination" or "Lasker sacrifice".
- Harry Nelson Pillsbury vs. Lasker, St Petersburg 1895. A brilliant sacrifice on the 17th move leads to a victorious attack.
- Wilhelm Steinitz vs. Lasker, London 1899. The old champion and the new one really go for it.
- Frank James Marshall vs. Lasker, World Championship Match 1907, game 1. Lasker's attack is insufficient for a quick win, so he trades it in for an endgame in which he quickly ties Marshall in knots.
- Lasker vs. Carl Schlechter, match 1910, game 10. Not a great game, but the one that saved Lasker from losing his world title in 1910.
- Lasker vs. Jose Raul Capablanca, St Petersburg 1914. Lasker, who needed a win here, surprisingly used a quiet opening, allowing Capablanca to simplify the game early. There has been much debate about whether Lasker's approach represented subtle psychology or deep positional understanding.
- Max Euwe vs. Lasker, Zurich 1934. 66-year-old Lasker beats a future World Champion, sacrificing his queen to turn defence into attack.

== See also ==
- List of Jewish chess players

Achievements
Preceded by Wilhelm Steinitz	World Chess Champion; 1894–1921	Succeeded by José Raúl Capablanca
