= Vladimir Alatortsev =

Soviet chess player (1909–1987)

Personal information
- Full name: Vladimir Alexeyevich Alatortsev
- Born: 14 May 1909 Turki, Saratov oblast, Russian Empire
- Died: 13 January 1987 (aged 77) Moscow, Soviet Union

Chess career
- Country: Soviet Union
- Title: International Master (1950); Honorary Grandmaster (1983)

Vladimir Alexeyevich Alatortsev (Russian: Влади́мир Алексе́евич Ала́торцев, pronounced "a LAH tart sev"; 14 May 1909 – 13 January 1987) was a Soviet chess player, author, and administrator. During his career, he became champion of both Leningrad and Moscow, and played in the Soviet Chess Championship finals nine times, with his best competitive results in the 1930s. He placed clear second in the 1933 Soviet final. He retired from most competitive play in the early 1950s, moving into roles as a chess organizer, teacher, and coach. He served as chairman of the All-Union chess section from 1954 to 1959 and as chairman of the USSR Chess Federation from 1959 to 1961. By profession, he was a hydraulics engineer.

== Early years, peaks pre-war ==
Alatortsev was an early Leningrad chess rival of Mikhail Botvinnik, who later became World Champion. However, Botvinnik, who was two years younger, established complete dominance over Alatortsev right from the start, and wound up with a 9–0 lifetime won-loss score with two games drawn.

Alatortsev's first important high-level result was a shared 3rd–6th place in the Soviet Championship, Moscow 1931, with a score of 10 points out of 17; Botvinnik won. Alatortsev was again runner-up to Botvinnik in the 1932 Leningrad Championship with 7/11. Alatortsev made his best Soviet Championship result in 1933 at Leningrad (URS-ch08), when he placed clear second with 13/19, as Botvinnik won his second title. At Tbilisi 1933, he tied for 1st–2nd places with Viktor Goglidze at 10/14.

He shared the Leningrad title in 1933–34 with Georgy Lisitsin on 11/15. In the 1934 Leningrad International Alatortsev scored 4½/11, as Botvinnik won to continue his dominance, and scored 7/13 in the Leningrad National tournament in May 1934 for 8th place, as Ilya Rabinovich won. In the 1934 Soviet Championship at Leningrad, he scored 10½/19 for a tied 5th–8th place; Grigory Levenfish and Ilya Rabinovich won. He earned a place in the 1935 Moscow International tournament, the strongest Soviet event since 1925, and finished with an even score of 9½ /19, as Botvinnik and Salo Flohr won.

Alatortsev drew a 12-game match (+4 =4 −4) with the Hungarian Andor Lilienthal in 1935. He was jointly champion of Moscow in both 1936 and 1937. Then in the 1937 Soviet Championship at Tbilisi, Alatortsev made 9½/19 to tie 10th–12th places.

Alatortsev posted his second best pre-war result when he tied for 1st–2nd places with Leonid Shamaev in a strong tournament at Leningrad 1938, with 14/21, ahead of Lilienthal and Viacheslav Ragozin. Chessmetrics.com ranks this as a 2684 performance. In the Leningrad-Moscow tournament of 1939, Alatortsev tied for 9th–10th places on 9/17, as Flohr won.

He had to qualify for the next Soviet final, and in the semi-final at Kiev 1940, he scored 9½/16 to tie for 4th–7th places, but did not advance to the final, losing out on tiebreak. Chessmetrics ranks him as #21 in the world for August 1940, with a rating of 2626.

== War years ==
With the invasion of the Soviet Union in June 1941, organized chess was put to a stop for the next several years; but Alatortsev's solid pre-war results earned him an invitation to a strong event at Kuibyshev 1942. He made 6½/11 for seventh place, as Isaac Boleslavsky won. He then scored 7/15 at the 1942 Moscow Championship.

== Post-war form drops ==
With the Axis forces in full retreat by 1944, organized chess slowly got going again in the Soviet Union. Alatortsev struggled in the 1944 Soviet Championship at Moscow with just 5½/16 for 16th place, as Botvinnik won. He had to return to qualifying for the next Soviet final, and made it through at Moscow in the semi-final with 10½/15 to tie for 2nd–4th places, as David Bronstein won. In the final that same year in Moscow, he scored just 7½/17, as Botvinnik dominated the field.

Alatortsev played the 1945 Latvian Championship at Riga, and won the tournament (but not the title; he was playing hors concours). He scored 8½/15 in the 1946 Moscow Championship to tie for 4th–5th places, as Bronstein won again. He was below 50 per cent for the next two Soviet finals as well; in the Soviet Championship at Leningrad 1947, he made 7½/19, as Paul Keres won, and then in the next edition at Moscow 1948, he finished well down with 7½/18, as Bronstein and Alexander Kotov won. Alatortsev qualified successfully through the semi-final at Moscow 1949 with 9½/16, and then he played his last Soviet Championship final at Moscow 1950, scoring 9/17 to tie for 7th–10th places, as Keres won.

== Coach, organizer, author ==
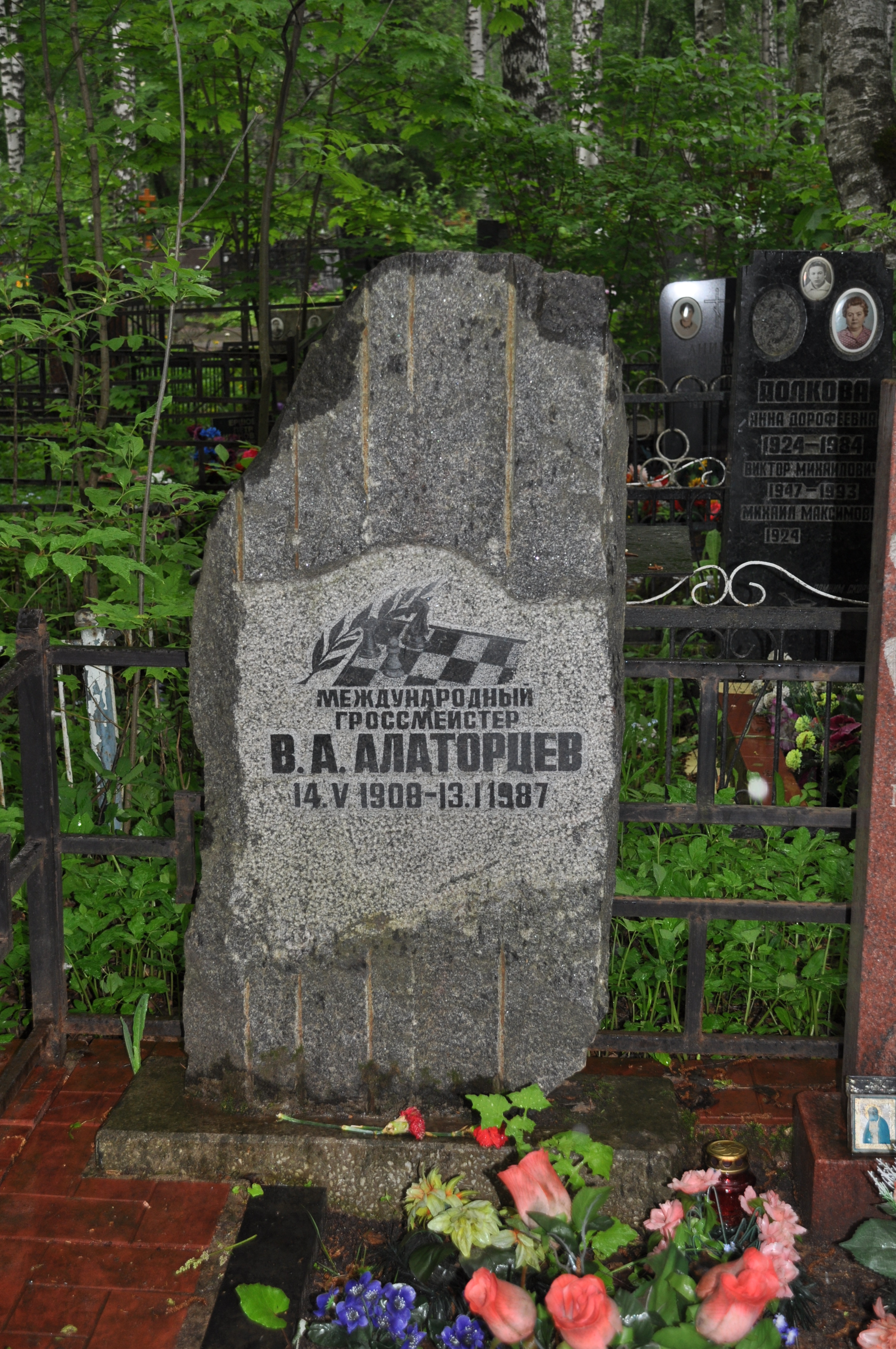
Alatortsev's gravestone in Dolgoprudny.

It was clear that the new generation of Soviet players was taking over the top places in tournaments. Players such as Alexander Kotov, Isaac Boleslavsky, David Bronstein, Efim Geller, Yuri Averbakh, Tigran Petrosian, and Mark Taimanov were all younger and had the benefits of organized Soviet training, so they surpassed the older generation in their achievements. Alatortsev moved into a training role in the late 1940s, assisting the rising star Vasily Smyslov. He also became involved in tournament organization and administration. Alatortsev was awarded the title International Master by FIDE, the World Chess Federation, in 1950, when this title was introduced officially.

Alatortsev stopped playing major tournaments in the early 1950s, but occasionally took part in lesser events. He served as head of the Soviet Chess Federation from 1954 to 1961, during a time when there were about three million registered Soviet players. From 1943 to 1974, he was the editor of a chess column in the newspaper Vechernyaya Moskva. In 1960, he published the book Modern Chess Theory. His final strong tournament was Tbilisi 1965, where at age 56 he made 8/17.

Alatortsev never got the opportunity to compete outside the Soviet Union. He was awarded the Honorary Emeritus Grandmaster title by FIDE in 1983. Alatortsev died at age 77, on 13 January 1987 in Moscow.

In the ECO database, the D31 line of the Queens Gambit Declined is named for Alatortsev.
