= Grigory Levenfish =

Soviet chess grandmaster (1889–1961)

Personal information
- Born: Grigory Yakovlevich Levenfish; 19 March 1889 Piotrków, Congress Poland, Russian Empire
- Died: 9 February 1961 (aged 71) Moscow, Soviet Union

Chess career
- Country: Russian Empire → Soviet Union
- Title: Grandmaster (1950)

Grigory Yakovlevich Levenfish (Russian: Григо́рий Я́ковлевич Левенфи́ш; 19 March 1889 [O.S. 7 March] – 9 February 1961) was a Soviet chess player who scored his peak competitive results in the 1920s and 1930s. He was twice Soviet champion, in 1934 (jointly with Ilya Rabinovich) and 1937. In 1937 he drew a match against future world champion Mikhail Botvinnik. In 1950 Levenfish was among the first recipients of the title of Grandmaster, awarded by FIDE that year for the first time. He was an engineer by profession.

== Early life and education ==
Levenfish was born in Piotrków, Poland, then part of the Russian Empire, to Jacob Levenfish and Golda Levenfish (née Finkelstein). He spent most of his formative years in St. Petersburg, where he attended Saint Petersburg State Institute of Technology and studied chemical engineering.

== Early chess achievements ==
His earliest recognition as a prominent chess player came when he won the St. Petersburg championship of 1909, and played in the strong Carlsbad tournament of 1911, where he scored 11½ points from 25 games. At age 22, this was to be his first and last tournament outside Russia or the Soviet Union. His play at the time was compared to that of Mikhail Chigorin. In the next decade, he won the Leningrad Championships of 1922, 1924, and 1925 (jointly).

== Soviet Championship ==
At a national level, he finished on the podium at the Soviet Championship on five occasions; third in 1920, second in 1923, second in 1925, co-champion at Leningrad in 1934 (tied with Ilya Rabinovich at 12/19), and outright champion at Tbilisi in 1937 with a score of 12½/19 points.

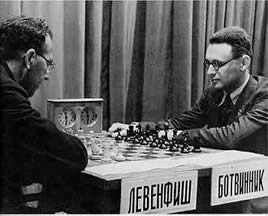
Levenfish (left) takes on Botvinnik in their 1937 match.

In the Moscow International tournament of 1935, he scored 10½/19 points to tie for 6th–7th places, as Mikhail Botvinnik and Salo Flohr won. In a Soviet-only tournament at Leningrad 1936, he was third with 8½/14. Participation in the Leningrad–Moscow training tournament of 1939 resulted in a shared 3rd–6th-place finish, with a score of 10/17, behind winner Flohr and Samuel Reshevsky.

In match play, he drew with Botvinnik in 1937 over 13 games, and beat Vladimir Alatortsev in 1940.

== Lack of support and recognition ==
Despite his successes, Levenfish was virtually ignored by the Soviet chess authorities, who gave their full blessing to the young rising star and committed communist Botvinnik. He was the only strong Soviet master of his generation who was denied a stipend. This meant that he could only afford a poorly heated room in a run-down block of flats. Furthermore, the government refused him permission to travel abroad and compete in tournaments such as AVRO 1938 (even though he was the reigning Soviet Champion). This further weakened his standing and most likely affected his morale, as well as his development as a chess player. Other players born before the revolution, such as Alexander Alekhine, Efim Bogoljubow, and Akiba Rubinstein were all allowed to travel and even ended up living abroad. Deprived of the same opportunities, Levenfish played only within the confines of Soviet Russia and supplemented his income with a job as an engineer in the glass industry. This eventually resulted in a slow retirement from active play.

Levenfish was awarded the title of International Grandmaster by FIDE, the world chess federation, in 1950, the year the title was introduced officially.

== Legacy ==
Genna Sosonko, in his book Russian Silhouettes, echoes the thoughts of some grandmasters who knew him, and they speak of a man of integrity and independence, who never complained about his difficult living conditions. Boris Spassky encountered him in a Moscow subway, just days before his death. Levenfish, who had a wretched look, was clutching a handkerchief to his mouth and declared that he had just had six teeth extracted. Vasily Smyslov recounts the time that Levenfish visited him, towards the end of his life, armed with a huge pile of papers. It turned out to be a manuscript detailing his lifetime work on rook endgames. He asked Smyslov to check for errors, and some minor corrections later, the book was published (1957) bearing both names, under the title Teoriya ladeynykh okonchaniy ("The theory of rook endings"), later published in English in 1971 under the title Rook Endings. Smyslov freely admits that all of the hard work was carried out by his co-author.

Levenfish Attack

Position: a8 black rook, b8 black knight, c8 black bishop, d8 black queen, e8 black king, f8 black bishop, h8 black rook, a7 black pawn, b7 black pawn, e7 black pawn, f7 black pawn, h7 black pawn, d6 black pawn, f6 black knight, g6 black pawn, d4 white knight, e4 white pawn, f4 white pawn, c3 white knight, a2 white pawn, b2 white pawn, c2 white pawn, g2 white pawn, h2 white pawn, a1 white rook, c1 white bishop, d1 white queen, e1 white king, f1 white bishop, h1 white rook

6.f4 against the Sicilian Dragon

In his time, Levenfish also wrote books for beginners and edited a collaborative effort on chess openings, titled Sovremenny debyut ("Modern openings"). His posthumously published autobiography, Izbrannye partii i vospominaniya (1967), contained 79 annotated games.

Regarding his playing abilities, Sosonko points to his deep understanding of the game and a keen eye for brilliantly imaginative moves. He was also an opening theorist; the Levenfish Attack, a variation of the Sicilian Defence, is named after him.

== Playing style ==
Levenfish defeated virtually all of the top Russian and Soviet players from the 1910s to the early 1950s, and beat world champions Alexander Alekhine and Emanuel Lasker as well. However, he was bested by young superstars Paul Keres and David Bronstein. Levenfish was strong on the Black side of the French Defence and the Slav Defence, and generally preferred classical openings such as Ruy Lopez and Queen's Gambit, although he did from time to time toy with the hypermodern Grünfeld Defence and Nimzo-Indian Defence.

== Books ==
- Izbrannye partii i vospominaniya, by Grigory Levenfish, 1967. In Russian. Translated into English by Douglas Griffin and published by Quality Chess under the title Soviet Outcast in 2019. ISBN 9781784830861.
- Rook Endings, by Grigory Levenfish and Vasily Smyslov. Translated by Philip J. Booth, 1971, Batsford. ISBN 0-7134-0449-3.
- Sovremenny debyut, edited by Grigory Levenfish, 1940. In Russian.

== See also ==
- List of Jewish chess players
