= Timeline of chess =

This is a timeline of chess.

== Early history ==
- 6th century – The game chaturanga probably evolved into its current form around this time in India.
- 569 – A Chinese emperor wrote a book of xiangqi, Xiang Jing, in AD 569.
- c. 600 – The Karnamuk-i-Artakhshatr-i-Papakan contains references to the Persian game of shatranj, the direct ancestor of modern Chess. Shatranj was initially called "Chatrang" in Persian (named after the Indian version), which was later renamed to shatranj.
- c. 720 – Chess spreads across the Islamic world from Persia.
- c. 840 – Earliest surviving chess problems by Caliph Billah of Baghdad.
- c. 900 – Entry on Chess in the Chinese work Huan Kwai Lu ('Book of Marvels').
- 997 – Versus de scachis is the earliest known work mentioning chess in Christian Western Europe.
- 10th century – As-Suli writes Kitab Ash-Shatranj, the earliest known work to take a scientific approach to chess strategy.
- late 10th century – Dark and light squares are introduced on a chessboard.
- 1008 – Mention of chess in the will of Count Uregel, another early reference.
- 1173 – Earliest recorded use of a form of Algebraic Chess Notation.
- 1283 – Alfonso X compiles the Libro de los juegos, with an extensive collection of chess problems.
- late 13th century – Pawns can now move two ranks on first move.
- late 14th century – The en passant rule is introduced.
- 1422 – A manuscript from Kraków sets the rule that stalemate is a draw.
- 1471 – The Göttingen manuscript is the first book to deal solely with chess.
- 1474 – William Caxton publishes The Game and Playe of Chesse, the first chess book in English.
- 1475–1525 – Castling and the modern moves for the queen and bishop are slowly adopted.
- 1475 – Scachs d'amor the first published game of modern chess, written as a poem.
- 1493 – Hartmann Schedel publishes the Nuremberg Chronicle. It mentions the invention of chess by the philosopher Xerxes in Babylon during the rule of Evil-Merodach, the son of Nebuchadrezzar and illustrates the citation with a woodcut of Xerxes.
- 1497 – Luis Ramirez Lucena publishes the earliest surviving work on the modern European game.

== 16th century ==
- 1510 – Marco Girolamo Vida wrote Scacchia ludus (The Game of Chess) with the first reference to a goddess of chess.
- 1512 – Pedro Damiano publishes one of the first chess treatises, Questo libro e da imparare giocare a scachi et de li partiti. One of the oldest surviving manuscripts to detail chess strategy, Damiano's work gives the earliest known refutation of an unsound chess opening. This opening, the Damiano Defense is named in his honor. The Damiano Variation of the Petrov Defense will also later be named for Damiano's work, appearing in a game in which Damiano (playing white) takes advantage of poor play by Black to fork his King and Queen.
- 1561 – Inspired by Damiano's previous written work, Spaniard chess player Ruy López writes his book Libro de la invención liberal y arte del juego del axedrez, in which he coins the word gambit to describe opening sacrifices.
- 1575 – The first known championship between Chess Masters is held in Madrid, between Italian masters Giovanni Leonardo and Paolo Boi along with Spanish masters Ruy López and Alfonso Ceron. Leonardo wins, with Boi placing second, López third, and Ceron fourth.

== 17th century ==
- 1620-24 – Gioachino Greco writes a number of manuscripts on Chess strategy, giving the first known descriptions of Fool's Mate and Smothered Mate, as well as detailing a number of opening traps. His overall strategy promotes aggressive play. Most of Greco's games feature the King's Gambit Accepted or Giuoco Piano, and his work is greatly influential in popularizing both of these openings throughout the rest of the 17th, 18th, and 19th centuries.
- 1634 – Alessandro Salvio publishes Il Puttino, a book describing Italian Chess masters of the previous century.
- 1690 – Openings are now systematically classified in the book Traité du Jeu Royal des échets, published in 1675 in Lausanne, France by the printer David Gentil (author unknown). This book is known by the nickname Traite de Lausanne.

== 18th century ==
- 1737 – Philipp Stamma (Syria) publishes Essai sur le jeu des échecs. The book features an early form of algebraic notation (for example, '1. e4 e5' in modern notation would be written as 'p e 4 | p e 5' in Stamma's). The first half primarily concerns opening theory, with particular emphasis on various opening gambits, and the second half gives the first detailed exploration of endgame theory.
- 1744 – François-André Danican Philidor (France) plays two opponents blindfolded in Paris.
- 1745 – Philipp Stamma's work is translated from French to English, and published as 'The Noble Game of Chess'.
- 1747 – Philidor decisively defeats Stamma in 8/9 games while visiting London, instantly gaining international fame.
- 1763 – Sir William Jones invents Caïssa, the chess muse.
- 1769 – Baron Wolfgang von Kempelen builds the Mechanical Turk, a fake chess-playing humanoid "machine" in fact operated secretly by a human.
- 1783 – Philidor plays as many as three games simultaneously without seeing the board.

== 19th century ==
- 1802 – Earliest known American chess book, Chess Made Easy by J. Humphreys is published.
- 1813 – The Liverpool Mercury prints the world's earliest chess column.
- 1824 – Earliest known British correspondence chess match, London – Edinburgh is held.
- 1830 – Earliest recorded instance of a modern female chess player.
- 1834 – Earliest recorded international challenge match is held: Alexander McDonnell (Ireland) versus Louis de la Bourdonnais (France) at the Westminster Chess Club, London.
- 1843 – Howard Staunton (England) wins a match against Pierre Charles Fournier de Saint-Amant (France) in Paris.
- 1845 – Telegraph is used to transmit moves in a match between London and Portsmouth.
- 1846 – Deutsche Schachzeitung is the first German chess magazine.
- 1848 – Earliest known instance of a game played between blind players.
- 1849 – The Staunton chess set is created by Nathaniel Cooke.
- 1851 – First international tournament is held in London, and won by Adolf Anderssen (Prussia).
- 1852 – Sandglasses are first used to time a game.
- 1857 – First American Chess Congress, won by 20-year-old Paul Morphy (USA), causes a chess epidemic across the U.S.
- 1857 – The United Kingdom Chess Association is formed.
- 1858 – The California Chess Congress is held in San Francisco, won by Selim Franklin
- 1859 – Paul Morphy is acclaimed as the world's strongest player after two years of international play against the world's leading players in the US and Europe. However, he was unable to secure even a single game against Staunton.
- 1861 – Games are played via transoceanic cables (Dublin–Liverpool).
- 1867 – Mechanical game clocks are introduced in tournament play.
- 1870 – Earliest recorded tournament in Germany (Baden-Baden).
- 1871 – Durand publishes the first book on endgames.
- 1873 – The Neustadtl score system is first used in a tournament.
- 1874 – Chess codexes written by 16th century Italian master Giulio Cesare Polerio are rediscovered by Antonius van der Linde. van der Linde recognizes that Polerio's work likely had greatly influenced the later works of Greco, and feature a nearly modern form of algebraic notation.
- 1877 – Formation of the Deutsche Schachbund.
- 1879 – First New Zealand Chess Championship, the longest running national chess championship in the world.
- 1883 – Invention of Forsyth-Edwards Notation, a notation used to describe any possible chess position.
- 1884 – Morphy dies.
- 1886 – First official World Chess Championship match is held between Wilhelm Steinitz and Johannes Zukertort. Steinitz wins decisively with the score 12½–7½ to become the first official World Chess Champion.
- 1888 – First international correspondence tournament.
- 1888 – U.S. Chess Championship starts.
- 1894 – Emanuel Lasker defeats Steinitz in a world championship match to become the second official world champion.
- 1895 – Hastings 1895 chess tournament at Hastings, England.
- 1899 – Chess clocks now have timeout flags to indicate that a player's time has run out.

== 20th century ==
- 1902 – First radio chess match by players on two American ships.
- 1904 – British Chess Federation (BCF) is established.
- 1905 – British national championship for women starts.
- 1907 – Lasker – Marshall World Championship match in several US cities.
- 1910 – José Raúl Capablanca (Cuba) is the first to win a major tournament (in New York) with a 100% score.
- 1911 – The first simultaneous exhibition with more than 100 participants is held.
- 1913 – Publication of H. J. R. Murray's book A History of Chess.
- 1913 – The grasshopper is the first fairy piece invented, having its origin in the Renaissance "leaping queen".
- 1919 – Capablanca gives a simultaneous in the House of Commons against 39 players.
- 1921 – The first British correspondence chess championship is held.
- 1921 – Capablanca defeats Lasker in Havana +4 −0 =10 to become the third official world champion. However, Lasker had resigned the title to Capablanca in 1920 and the match participants had agreed that Capablanca was the defending champion in the match.
- 1924 – Establishment of Fédération Internationale des Échecs (FIDE), the international chess federation.
- 1924 – Staunton set officially adopted by FIDE.
- 1927 – The first official Chess Olympiad is held in London.
- 1927 – Alexander Alekhine (Soviet Union) defeats Capablanca at Buenos Aires with +6 −3 =25 to become the fourth official world champion.
- 1935 – Max Euwe (Netherlands) wins the world championship title from Alekhine in Zandvoort, the Netherlands +9 −8 =13 and becomes the fifth official world champion.
- 1937 – A record for simultaneous blindfold play against 34 opponents.
- 1937 – Alekhine regains his champion title from Euwe in The Netherlands +10 −4 =11.
- 1941 – Basic Chess Endings by Reuben Fine published.
- 1945 – USA vs USSR radio match is the first international sporting event after World War II. The USSR scores an overwhelming victory.
- 1946 – Reigning world champion Alekhine dies in Portugal, leaving the title vacant. FIDE moves to gain control of the world championship.
- 1947 – The first postage stamp with a chess motif was printed by Bulgaria.
- 1948 – Mikhail Botvinnik (Soviet Union) wins the 1948 World Chess Championship tournament, which was held jointly at the Hague (in the Netherlands) and Moscow. He becomes the sixth official world champion.
- 1949 – Claude Shannon speculates on how computers might play chess.
- 1950 – FIDE introduces the International Grandmaster (GM) and International Master (IM) lifetime titles to indicate chess achievement.
- 1950 – The first Candidates Tournament is held in Budapest. David Bronstein wins after a playoff against Isaac Boleslavsky.
- 1951 – Botvinnik retains his title after the World Championship match with challenger Bronstein ends in a 12–12 tie.
- 1951 – The first World Junior Chess Championship held.
- 1952 – The Soviet Union begins its string of Chess Olympiad victories.
- 1953 – Vasily Smyslov (Soviet Union) wins the Candidates Tournament at Zurich.
- 1954 – Botvinnik retains his title after the World Championship match with challenger Smyslov ends in a 12–12 tie.
- 1956 – Smyslov wins the Candidates Tournament in Amsterdam. Paul Keres (Soviet Union) finishes second.
- 1957 – Smyslov defeats Botvinnik by the score 12½–9½ and becomes the seventh official world champion.
- 1958 – Botvinnik defeats Smyslov in a rematch by the score 12½–10½ to regain the title.
- 1958 – Bobby Fischer (USA) qualifies for the 1959 Candidates Match, becoming the youngest ever Grandmaster. This record would stand until 1991.
- 1959 – Mikhail Tal (Soviet Union) wins the Candidates Tournament in Yugoslavia. Keres finishes second.
- 1960 – Tal defeats Botvinnik +6 −2 =13 to become the eighth official world champion and the then youngest-ever world champion.
- 1961 – Botvinnik defeats Tal in a rematch by the score +10 −5 =6 to regain the title.
- 1962 – Tigran Petrosian (Soviet Union) wins the Candidates Tournament in Curaçao, going through the tournament without a defeat. Keres finishes second in a Candidates Tournament for the third consecutive time.
- 1963 – Petrosian defeats Botvinnik 12½–9½ to become the ninth World Chess Champion.
- 1965 – Boris Spassky (Soviet Union) wins Candidates Matches against Keres, Efim Geller, and Tal.
- 1966 – Petrosian successfully defends his World Championship title against Spassky, 12½–11½.
- 1967 – Bent Larsen (Denmark) wins the Sousse Interzonal after Fischer withdraws after ten games while leading with 8½ points. Larsen also wins the first Chess Oscar.
- 1969 – Spassky defeats Petrosian 12½–11½ to become the tenth World Chess Champion.
- 1970 – Fischer wins the Palma de Mallorca Interzonal 3½ points ahead of his nearest rival.
- 1971 – Fischer blazes through his Candidates Matches, defeating Mark Taimanov and Larsen each 6–0, and Petrosian by 6½–2½. Fischer establishes a 20-game winning streak in 1970 and 1971.
- 1972 – Fischer beats Spassky in the World Chess Championship 1972 12½–8½. Due to its status as Cold War sporting confrontation, the match receives worldwide publicity.
- 1975 – Anatoly Karpov (Soviet Union) becomes the twelfth World Champion without having defeated the reigning champion as Fischer forfeits his crown.
- 1977 – Female player Nona Gaprindashvili (Soviet Union) wins the men's tournament at Lone Pine.
- 1978 – Gaprindashvili becomes the first woman to receive the FIDE Grandmaster title.
- 1978 – FIDE Master (FM) introduced as a title below International Master.
- 1978 – First Sargon (chess) chess-playing software for personal computers introduced at the 1978 West Coast Computer Faire.
- 1981 – Karpov convincingly defeats challenger Viktor Korchnoi six wins to two to retain the World Championship.
- 1984 – In a controversial decision, the FIDE president abandons the World Championship match between defending champion Karpov and challenger Garry Kasparov (Soviet Union) after 48 games, with Karpov leading 5–3.
- 1985 – Kasparov defeats Karpov to become the thirteenth World Chess Champion 13–11.
- 1986 – The musical Chess opens in London's West End.
- 1991 – Judit Polgár (Hungary) becomes the youngest ever Grandmaster, breaking Bobby Fischer's record by about a month.
- 1992 – Fischer beats Spassky in a match in FR Yugoslavia in a rematch of the 1972 World Championship.
- 1993 – Searching for Bobby Fischer motion picture released (in the United Kingdom as "Innocent Moves").

– Kasparov and Nigel Short (England) break from FIDE to play their world championship match, forming the Professional Chess Association (PCA).

- 1996 – Deep Blue beats Kasparov in the first game won by a chess-playing computer against a reigning world champion under normal chess tournament conditions. Kasparov recovers to win the match 4–2 (three wins, one loss, two draws).
- 1997 – Kasparov loses a rematch to chess supercomputer Deep Blue (2½–3½), becoming the first World Champion to lose a match to a computer.
- 1999 – Kasparov plays and wins against "the World" whose moves were determined by plurality of votes via the Internet.
- 2000 – Kasparov loses his title to Vladimir Kramnik (Russia) (8½–6½). Kramnik becomes the PCA World Chess Champion.

== 21st century ==
- 2001 – FIDE introduces shortened time controls for the knockout world championship held later that year, amid controversy.
- 2002 – Sergey Karjakin (Russia) becomes the youngest ever Grandmaster at age 12 years and 7 months.
- 2003 – In two separate matches, Kasparov battles Deep Junior and X3D Fritz to draws. These would be the last notable human–computer chess matches that did not result in victory for the computer.
- 2004 – Rustam Kasimdzhanov (Uzbekistan) wins the FIDE World Chess Championship 2004 by beating Michael Adams (England) in the final.
- 2004 – Kramnik successfully defends his title in the Classical World Chess Championship 2004 against Peter Leko (Hungary).
- 2005 – Veselin Topalov (Bulgaria) wins the FIDE World Chess Championship 2005 with 10/14 (+6 −0 =8).
- 2006 – World Chess Championship reunited when "Classical" (technically, first PCA then Braingames) World Champion Kramnik defeats FIDE World Champion Topalov in the FIDE World Chess Championship 2006 match.
- 2007 – Viswanathan Anand (India) becomes the fifteenth World Chess Champion after winning the World Chess Championship 2007 tournament held in Mexico City. Anand finished the tournament with a score of 9/14 (+4 −0 =10).
- 2008 – Fischer dies in Iceland at age 64.
- 2008 – Anand successfully defends his title against Vladimir Kramnik (Russia) in the World Chess Championship 2008.
- 2009 – Eighteen-year-old Magnus Carlsen (Norway) wins the super-grandmaster (Category 21) Nanjing Pearl Spring Tournament, scoring an undefeated 8–2 in the double round robin event. Carlsen's performance rating for the tournament is 3002, one of the highest in history, and his rating goes over 2800, making him the fifth player (and by far the youngest) to attain that rating level.
- 2009 – Kasparov and Karpov play each other once more, as a commemoration of their first World Championship Match 25 years earlier.
- 2010 – Anand successfully defends his world title against Topalov in the World Chess Championship 2010.
- 2011 – Boris Gelfand (Israel) wins the 2011 Candidates tournament and qualifies to challenge Anand in the World Chess Championship 2012.
- 2012 – Carlsen achieves an Elo rating of 2861, surpassing Kasparov's record of 2851. Anand successfully defends his world title against Gelfand.
- 2013 – Carlsen defeats Anand to become the new world champion.
- 2014 – Carlsen reaches his top Elo rating of 2882, the highest in history, in May.
- 2014 – Carlsen successfully defends his title of World Champion in a match against Anand, who had won the Candidates Tournament.
- 2016 – Carlsen successfully defends his World Champion title against Sergey Karjakin (Russia) by winning rapid tiebreak games after drawing the 12-game classical match.
- 2018 – Carlsen successfully defends his World Champion title against Fabiano Caruana (USA) by winning rapid tiebreak games after drawing the 12-game classical match.
- 2020 – Chess experiences a spike in popularity due to the COVID-19 pandemic and the Netflix miniseries The Queen's Gambit.
- 2021 – Abhimanyu Mishra (United States) becomes the youngest ever Grandmaster at the age of 12 years 4 months and 25 days.
- 2021 – Carlsen successfully defends his World Champion title against Ian Nepomniachtchi (Russia) after 11 rounds of the 14-game match.
- 2022 – Carlsen announces the news that he would no longer defend his World Champion title, letting the next world champion be decided in between the winner Ian Nepomniachtchi| and the runner-up Ding Liren (China) of the 2022 Candidates Tournament.
- 2023 – Ding Liren defeats Ian Nepomniachtchi in the 2023 World Chess Championship to become the first World Champion from China.
- 2024 – Gukesh Dommaraju (India) wins the 2024 World Chess Championship, becoming the youngest undisputed world chess champion at the age of 18.

== See also ==
- Chess
- History of chess
- Chess in early literature
- Chess in Europe
- Schools of chess
