= 1991 in chess =

Below is a list of events in chess in 1991, as well as the top ten FIDE rated chess players of that year.

== Top players ==
FIDE top 10 by Elo rating - January 1991

1. Garry Kasparov Soviet Union 2800
2. Anatoly Karpov Soviet Union 2725
3. Boris Gelfand Soviet Union 2700
4. Vassily Ivanchuk Soviet Union 2695
5. Evgeny Bareev Soviet Union 2650
6. Mikhail Gurevich Soviet Union 2650
7. Jan Ehlvest Soviet Union 2650
8. Leonid Yudasin Soviet Union 2645
9. Valery Salov Soviet Union 2645
10. Alexander Beliavsky* Soviet Union 2640

(*) Beliavsky was tied with Ulf Andersson, Alexander Khalifman and Gata Kamsky

== Chess news in brief ==
- The World Championship Candidates' quarter-final line-up comprises Viswanathan Anand, Boris Gelfand, Vassily Ivanchuk, Anatoly Karpov, Viktor Korchnoi, Nigel Short, Jan Timman and Artur Yusupov. All matches are played in Brussels, where Anand comes close to defeating Karpov, but loses 3 1/2-4 1/2, Gelfand is beaten by Short 3–5, Ivanchuk loses out to Yusupov 4 1/2-5 1/2 after two tie-break games and Timman convincingly beats an out-of-form Korchnoi 4 1/2-2 1/2.
- The Women's Candidates' Tournament requires a tie-break to separate joint winners Xie Jun and Alisa Marić. In a match that moves from Belgrade to Beijing, Xie Jun wins 4 1/2-2 1/2 and advances to face Maia Chiburdanidze for the Women's World Chess Championship in Manila. The Chinese challenger continues to impress and captures the world title by a score of 8 1/2-6 1/2.
- Garry Kasparov wins a strong double-round Tilburg event with 10/14, one and a half points clear of second-placed Short.
- Ivanchuk wins at the Linares tournament with 9 1/2/13, ahead of Kasparov on 9/13.
- Valery Salov and Short share victory at Amsterdam's 5th Euwe Memorial with 6/9, ahead of Karpov and Kasparov with 5 1/2/9. All four players go through the tournament unbeaten.
- In the first tournament of the second World Cup, Ivanchuk and Karpov are winners at Reykjavík with 10 1/2/15. The World Cup is then abandoned, when Kasparov and Karpov are refused their requests for appearance fees and create an impasse. It is a sad conclusion to an exciting new series of events and heralds a decline in the fortunes of the Grandmasters Association (GMA). The World Cup branding is however resurrected much later.
- Karpov finishes on top at the double-round, 33rd Reggio Emilia tournament, held at the 1990/91 year end. His winning score of 7 1/2/12 narrowly eclipses Lev Polugaevsky in second place, with 7/12.
- Gelfand is victorious at Belgrade with 7 1/2/11, ahead of Gata Kamsky and John Nunn on 7/11.
- A double-rounder at Biel is won by Alexei Shirov (9 1/2/14), with Evgeny Bareev in second place on 8 1/2/14.
- Nunn wins at Wijk aan Zee, in the 53rd 'Hoogovens' tournament, with 8 1/2/13. It is Nunn's second successive win. Second place (8/13) is shared by Michael Adams, Alexander Khalifman, Alexander Chernin and Curt Hansen.
- Larry Christiansen is successful at a strong tournament in Munich, his 9 1/2/13 being a clear point-and-a-half ahead of second place. With wife Natasha, he moves to Germany to set up a temporary base, as he is spending increasing time playing in Europe. His Munich winning margin is later repeated at the Vienna International, where he finishes with 7 1/2/9, ahead of Vladimir Epishin on 6/9.
- Bareev completes the first of three memorable, consecutive victories at the Hastings International Chess Congress.
- Timman wins the 2nd Trophée Immopar, held in Paris. The tournament comprises a rapid chess format of 25 minutes per player for the entire game.
- Grigory Sanakoev becomes the 12th World Correspondence Chess Champion.
- Vladimir Akopian of Armenia becomes the 30th World Junior Chess Champion in Mamaia, Romania.
- Judit Polgár wins the Hungarian Chess Championship and breaks Bobby Fischer's record, by becoming the youngest Grandmaster in the history of chess. She is awarded the title at 15 years, 4 months and 28 days.
- Artashes Minasian is the surprising winner of the 58th and final USSR Chess Championship. A symbolic entry of sixty-four contains many future stars, such as Vladimir Kramnik, Alexei Shirov and Sergei Tiviakov. Kramnik, at just sixteen, is the newly crowned Under-18 World Youth Champion. At the other end of the spectrum, Mikhail Tal participates, but is desperately unwell and it turns out to be one of his last tournaments.
- Kamsky wins the US Chess Championship in Los Angeles.
- The Women's Interzonal tournament, held in Subotica, is shared by Nona Gaprindashvili and Peng Zhaoqin.
- Joel Benjamin wins the 19th World Open at Philadelphia and the American Open at Los Angeles.
- Shirov wins the 15th Lloyds Bank Masters in London.
- The first World Senior Chess Championship is held in Bad Wörishofen. The men's title is won by Vasily Smyslov and the women's by Eve Karakas. Competitors have to be at least 60 years old on January 1 of the year the event is held.
- Eugenio Torre wins the Pan-Pacific International.
- China wins the 9th Asian Games Team Championship in Penang, Malaysia.
- ChessMachine wins the World Microcomputer Chess Championship held in Vancouver.
- Shakhmaty v SSSR ceases publication.

== Births ==
- Tan Zhongyi, Chinese prodigy, World Youth Champion for Girls at U-10 (twice) and U-12 - November 5
- Ju Wenjun, Chinese player in FIDE's list of World Top 10 Girls - January 31

== Deaths ==
- Osmo Kaila, Finnish International Master, twice the national champion - June 3
- Brian Reilly, Irish chess player, writer and longtime editor of British Chess Magazine - December 29
- Gia Nadareishvili, Georgian chess composer and author - October 3
