= Corus Chess Tournament 2001 =

Chess tournament

- Venue: Wijk aan Zee

The Corus Chess Tournament 2001 was the 63rd edition of the Corus Chess Tournament. It was held in Wijk aan Zee in January 2001 and was won for the third consecutive year by Garry Kasparov.

The top nine players in the January ratings list took part, and Kasparov's victory meant he was the first player in the tournament's history to win the title three years in a row.

63rd Corus Chess Tournament, group A, 13–28 January 2001, Wijk aan Zee, Cat. XIX (2710)
	Player	Rating	1	2	3	4	5	6	7	8	9	10	11	12	13	14	Total	TPR	Place
1	Garry Kasparov (Russia)	2849		½	½	½	½	½	1	½	1	1	½	½	1	1	9	2839	1
2	Viswanathan Anand (India)	2790	½		½	½	½	½	½	½	½	½	1	1	1	1	8½	2813	2
3	Vladimir Kramnik (Russia)	2772	½	½		1	½	0	1	½	½	½	1	½	1	½	8	2791	3–4
4	Vasyl Ivanchuk (Ukraine)	2717	½	½	0		½	1	1	½	½	1	½	½	½	1	8	2795	3–4
5	Michael Adams (England)	2746	½	½	½	½		1	½	½	½	0	1	½	1	½	7½	2763	5–7
6	Alexander Morozevich (Russia)	2745	½	½	1	0	0		½	0	½	1	1	1	1	½	7½	2763	5–7
7	Alexei Shirov (Spain)	2718	0	½	0	0	½	½		½	1	½	1	1	1	1	7½	2765	5–7
8	Peter Leko (Hungary)	2745	½	½	½	½	½	1	½		½	½	0	½	½	½	6½	2706	8
9	Veselin Topalov (Bulgaria)	2718	0	½	½	½	½	½	0	½		½	½	1	½	0	5½	2651	9
10	Alexei Fedorov (Belarus)	2575	0	½	½	0	1	0	½	½	½		½	0	0	1	5	2632	10–11
11	Loek van Wely (Netherlands)	2700	½	0	0	½	0	0	0	1	½	½		1	½	½	5	2623	10–11
12	Jeroen Piket (Netherlands)	2632	½	0	½	½	½	0	0	½	0	1	0		½	½	4½	2605	12–13
13	Sergei Tiviakov (Netherlands)	2597	0	0	0	½	0	0	0	½	½	1	½	½		1	4½	2608	12–13
14	Jan Timman (Netherlands)	2629	0	0	½	0	½	½	0	½	1	0	½	½	0		4	2574	14

63rd Corus Chess Tournament, group B, 13–28 January 2001, Wijk aan Zee, Cat. X (2496)
	Player	Rating	1	2	3	4	5	6	7	8	9	10	11	12	Total	TPR	Place
1	GM Mikhail Gurevich (Belgium)	2694		1	½	1	½	½	½	½	1	½	1	1	8	2652	1
2	IM Teimour Radjabov (Azerbaijan)	2483	0		½	1	½	½	0	1	1	1	1	1	7½	2629	2
3	GM Thomas Luther (Germany)	2544	½	½		½	½	½	1	½	0	1	1	1	7	2593	3–4
4	GM Friso Nijboer (Netherlands)	2578	0	0	½		1	1	½	½	1	½	1	1	7	2590	3–4
5	IM Pentala Harikrishna (India)	2514	½	½	½	0		½	½	½	½	1	1	1	6½	2559	5–6
6	IM Karel van der Weide (Netherlands)	2463	½	½	½	0	½		½	½	½	½	1	1	6	2534	5–6
7	GM Boris Gulko (United States)	2622	½	1	0	½	½	½		1	0	½	0	1	5½	2484	7–8
8	GM Dennis de Vreugt (Netherlands)	2452	½	0	½	½	½	½	0		1	1	0	1	5½	2499	7–8
9	IM Manuel Bosboom (Netherlands)	2439	0	0	1	0	½	½	1	0		0	1	1	5	2464	9
10	FM Yge Visser (Netherlands)	2442	½	0	0	½	0	½	½	0	1		½	½	4	2398	10
11	Nico Vink (Netherlands)	2335	0	0	0	0	0	0	1	1	0	½		0	2½	2299	11
12	IM Erik Hoeksema (Netherlands)	2382	0	0	0	0	0	0	0	0	0	½	1		1½	2197	12

(Lithuania) WGM Viktorija Čmilytė (2433) won Reserve Group Swiss-system tournament with the score 7/9 and performance rating 2616.
