= 1993 in chess =

Below is a list of events in chess in 1993, as well as the top ten FIDE rated chess players of that year.

== Top players ==
FIDE top 10 by Elo rating - January 1993

1. Garry Kasparov Russia 2805
2. Anatoly Karpov Russia 2725
3. Vassily Ivanchuk Ukraine 2710
4. Viswanathan Anand India 2710
5. Boris Gelfand Belarus 2690
6. Vladimir Kramnik Russia 2685
7. Alexei Shirov Latvia 2670
8. Evgeny Bareev Russia 2670
9. Kiril Georgiev Bulgaria 2660
10. Valery Salov Russia 2660

== Tournaments ==
List of strong chess tournaments in 1993.

Tournament	System	City	Players	Winner	Runner-up	Third
Hoogovens Wijk aan Zee Chess Tournament 1993	Single elimination	(Netherlands) Wijk aan Zee	24	(Russia) Anatoly Karpov	(Spain) Miguel Illescas	(Russia) Valery Salov (Estonia) Lembit Oll
Linares International Chess Tournament	Round robin	(Spain) Linares	14	(Russia) Garry Kasparov	(Russia) Anatoly Karpov	(India) Viswanathan Anand
Dortmund Sparkassen Chess Meeting	Round robin	(Germany) Dortmund	8	(Russia) Anatoly Karpov	(Russia) Vladimir Kramnik	(Germany) Christopher Lutz
SKA-Mephisto International Chess Tournament	Round robin	(Germany) Munich	12	(Latvia) Alexei Shirov	(Belarus) Boris Gelfand	(Belgium) Mikhail Gurevich
Belgrade Chess Tournament	Round robin	(Federal Republic of Yugoslavia) Belgrade	10	(Ukraine) Alexander Beliavsky	(Russia) Vladimir Kramnik	(Russia) Alexander Khalifman
Las Palmas Chess Tournament	Round robin	(Spain) Las Palmas	10	(Chile) Ivan Morovic	(India) Viswanathan Anand	(Russia) Alexander Khalifman
Tilburg chess tournament	Single elimination	(Netherlands) Tilburg	112	(Russia) Anatoly Karpov	(Ukraine) Vassily Ivanchuk	(Latvia) Alexei Shirov (Ukraine) Alexander Beliavsky
Interzonal Tournament	Swiss	(Switzerland) Biel	74	(Belarus) Boris Gelfand	(Netherlands) Paul van der Sterren	(United States) Gata Kamsky
PCA Qualifier	Swiss	(Netherlands) Groningen	54	(England) Michael Adams	(India) Viswanathan Anand	(United States) Gata Kamsky

== Chess news in brief ==
- Nigel Short defeats Jan Timman 7½-5½ at the San Lorenzo de El Escorial Candidates Final and emerges as Garry Kasparov's challenger for the World Chess Championship. Kasparov and Short controversially distance themselves from FIDE, setting up the Professional Chess Association (PCA) and announcing that their world championship match will be held in London under the auspices of the new organising body. FIDE denounces their actions and forfeits both players from its own world championship cycle, in the process stripping Kasparov of his FIDE world title. Kasparov wins the PCA world championship match against Short by a comfortable 12½-7½ margin.
- FIDE remove Kasparov and Short from its rating list and arrange a rival world championship match between Anatoly Karpov and Jan Timman, both of whom had been defeated by Short in the run up to the PCA final. Karpov wins the contest 12½-8½.
- Xie Jun successfully defends her Women's World Champion title against Nana Ioseliani in Monaco by the runaway score of 8½-2½.
- Kasparov wins a very strong Linares tournament with 10/13 from Karpov and Viswanathan Anand (both 8½/13); 11 of the world's top 14 players are in attendance.
- Karpov wins at Dortmund with 5½/7, ahead of Vladimir Kramnik and Christopher Lutz (both 4/7).
- Alexei Shirov wins at Munich with 8/11 (from Boris Gelfand on 7½/11).
- Alexander Beliavsky (7½/9) wins at Belgrade, ahead of Vladimir Kramnik (6/9).
- Ivan Morovic is victorious in Las Palmas with 6/9, edging out Anand and Alexander Khalifman (both 5½/9).
- Karpov wins the knockout tournament at Tilburg, defeating Vasily Ivanchuk in the final.
- FIDE's Interzonal is held at Biel, Switzerland. Boris Gelfand excels to win with 9/13, in front of a large group on 8½/13. Michael Adams, Gata Kamsky, Alexander Khalifman, Vladimir Kramnik, Joël Lautier, Valery Salov, Paul van der Sterren, Leonid Yudasin and Viswanathan Anand all qualify for the next stage.
- The PCA Qualifier (equivalent to FIDE's Interzonal) is held in Groningen, Netherlands. It is won by Michael Adams and Viswanathan Anand. The other qualifiers for the Candidates Matches are Vladimir Kramnik, Gata Kamsky, Sergei Tiviakov, Boris Gulko and Oleg Romanishin.
- The Women's Interzonal, held in Jakarta is won by Ketevan Arakhamia.
- The World Junior Chess Championship is won by Igor Miladinović of Serbia.
- Alexander Shabalov and Alex Yermolinsky both enjoy success in Philadelphia, winning the US Open and World Open, respectively. The two tie for the US Chess Championship held at Long Beach.
- The US Women's Chess Championship, held in Illinois is shared by Elena Donaldson and Irina Levitina.
- Judit Polgár and Evgeny Bareev share victory at the 1992/93 Hastings International Chess Congress.
- Gata Kamsky wins the U.S. National Open in Las Vegas.
- Mark Taimanov wins the World Senior Chess Championship in Bad Wildbad, Germany.
- Boris Spassky and Judit Polgár play a match in Budapest. Polgar wins.
- At the Harvard Cup, held in Boston, the humans beat the computers by a convincing score of 27-9. Joel Benjamin's winning tally is a perfect 6-0.
- In Bosnia and Herzegovina, a chess player is shot and killed by a sniper while playing a game.
- A movie titled Searching for Bobby Fischer in the US and Innocent Moves in the UK is released by Paramount. Based on the life of Joshua Waitzkin, it stars Max Pomeranc in the lead role. Oscar-winning actor Ben Kingsley plays the part of trainer Bruce Pandolfini.

== Births ==
- Parimarjan Negi, Indian prodigy, a GM and youngest ever IM - February 9
- Wesley So, Filipino prodigy, a GM at little over 14 years - October 9

== Deaths ==
- Reuben Fine, a leading player of the 1930s and 1940s, former US Champion and noted writer - March 26.
- Vladimir Makogonov, Soviet IM and honorary GM, a leading player of the 1940s - January 2
- Boris Kogan, Russian-American IM and former Soviet Junior Champion - December 25.
- Alexander Koblencs, Latvian IM, trainer and writer - December 9
- Johannes Turn, a leading Estonian master of the 1920s, 1930s and 1940s - March 8
