= 2000 in chess =

Events in chess during the year 2000:

== Top players ==
FIDE top 10 players by Elo rating - July 2000;

1. Garry Kasparov Russia 2849
2. Vladimir Kramnik Russia 2770
3. Viswanathan Anand India 2762
4. Alexander Morozevich Russia 2756
5. Michael Adams England 2755
6. Alexei Shirov Spain 2746
7. Peter Leko Hungary 2743
8. Vassily Ivanchuk Ukraine 2719
9. Veselin Topalov Bulgaria 2707
10. Michał Krasenkow Poland 2702

== Tournaments ==
Tournament	City	System	Dates	Players (2700+)	Winner	Runner-up
Corus Chess Tournament	(Netherlands) Wijk aan Zee	Round robin	15–30 Jan	14 (6)	(Russia) Garry Kasparov	(Russia) Vladimir Kramnik (Hungary) Peter Leko (India) Viswanathan Anand
Corus Chess Tournament Group B	(Netherlands) Wijk aan Zee	Round robin	18–30 Jan	12 (0)	(Netherlands) Sergei Tiviakov (Ukraine) Alexander Onischuk (Israel) Boris Avrukh	
Chess World Cup	(China) Shenyang	Group/Knockout	1 – 13 Sep	24 (4)	(India) Viswanathan Anand	(Russia) Evgeny Bareev
FIDE World Chess Championship	(India) New Delhi (Iran) Tehran	Knockout	27 Nov – 4 Oct	100 (9)	(India) Viswanathan Anand	(Spain) Alexei Shirov
Classical World Chess Championship	(United Kingdom) London	Match	8 Oct – 24 Dec	2 (2)	(Russia) Vladimir Kramnik	(Russia) Garry Kasparov

== Births ==
- Zhansaya Abdumalik, Kazakhstani chess player - 12 January
- Alexey Sarana - 26 January
- Max Warmerdam - 30 March
- Gunay Mammadzada - 19 June
- Haik M. Martirosyan - 14 July
- Temur Kuybokarov - 22 July
- Parham Maghsoodloo - 11 August
- Jeffery Xiong - 30 October
- Carlos Daniel Albornoz Cabrera - 26 December
- Samuel Sevian - 26 December

== Deaths ==
- Daniel Yanofsky, Canada's first chess Grandmaster - March 5
- Aivars Gipslis, Latvian Grandmaster and chess writer - April 13
- Arthur Dake, American chess master - April 28
- Vladimir Bagirov, Grandmaster, chess author, and chess trainer - died of a heart attack while playing chess in Finland - July 21
- George Koltanowski, record holder for most games won blindfolded simultaneously - September 17
- Karl Robatsch, Australian chess player and botanist - September 19
