= 2011 in chess =

Below is a list of events in chess during the year 2011:

== Events ==
=== January ===
FIDE January 2011 Top Ten
Rank	Prev	Player	Rating	Chng
1	2	Magnus Carlsen (NOR)	2814	+12
2	1	Viswanathan Anand (IND)	2810	+6
3	3	Levon Aronian (ARM)	2805	+4
4	4	Vladimir Kramnik (RUS)	2784	-7
5	9	Sergey Karjakin (RUS)	2776	+16
6	5	Veselin Topalov (BUL)	2775	-11
7	6	Alexander Grischuk (RUS)	2773	+2
8	8	Shakhriyar Mamedyarov (AZE)	2772	+9
9	7	Vassily Ivanchuk (UKR)	2764	0
10	15	Hikaru Nakamura (USA)	2751	+10

- January 1 – Magnus Carlsen (NOR) reclaims the top position in the FIDE world rankings with an Elo rating of 2814. Viswanathan Anand (IND) falls to second with a rating of 2810. Sergey Karjakin (RUS) has the greatest rating change among the top 10, improving 16 points from 2760 to 2776. Hikaru Nakamura (USA) appears in the world top 10 for the first time with a rating of 2751, displacing Wang Yue (CHN).
- January 5 –
  - Deep Sengupta (IND) and Arghyadip Das (IND) split first at the Hastings International Chess Congress.
  - Soumya Swaminathan (IND) wins the Indian Women's Championship.
  - Yannick Pelletier (SUI) wins the Basel Hilton Open at the Basel Chess Festival.
- January 6 – Vugar Gashimov (AZE) wins the 53rd Reggio Emilia tournament with a score of 6/9.
- January 9 –
  - Alexei Shirov (ESP) wins the Paul Keres Memorial Tournament.
  - Loek van Wely (NED) wins the Berkeley International.
- January 15 – Stewart Haslinger (ENG) wins the 36th Seville Open with a score of 7.5/9.
- January 16 – Alexander Areshchenko (UKR) wins the 9th Delhi Parsvnath International Open.
- January 20 – The free chess engine Houdini defeats reigning world computer chess champion Rybka in the Thoresen Chess Engines Competition.
- January 25 – Rafael Leitão (BRA) wins the Antonio Rocha Memorial Tournament with a score of 10/11.
- January 26 – Martyn Kravtsiv (UKR) wins the 3rd Chennai Open Tournament.
- January 30 – Hikaru Nakamura wins the newly renamed 73rd Tata Steel Chess Tournament with a score of 9/13, half a point ahead of runner-up Viswanathan Anand. This is Nakamura's first ever win at a super-GM event.
- January 31 – Zhao Zong-Yuan (AUS) qualifies for the Chess World Cup 2011 by winning the Oceana Zonal.

=== February ===
- February 3 –
  - Vassily Ivanchuk wins the Tradewise Gibraltar Chess Festival with a score of 9/10.
  - Archaeologists discover chess pieces that once belonged to James Madison at the President's Montpelier estate.
- February 6 – Atanas Kolev (BUL) wins the 33rd Bulgarian Open.
- February 7 – Vladimir Belous, an untitled 18 year old, takes first place at the Moscow Open.
- February 19 – Lê Quang Liêm (VIE) wins the 10th Aeroflot Open in Moscow.
- February 22 – Alexei Fedorov (BLR) wins the 9th Khazar Cup in Iran.
- February 23 – Gawain Jones (ENG) wins the Bunratty Chess Festival.

=== March ===
FIDE March 2011 Top Ten
Rank	Prev	Player	Rating	Chng
1	2	Viswanathan Anand (IND)	2817	+7
2	1	Magnus Carlsen (NOR)	2815	+1
3	3	Levon Aronian (ARM)	2808	+3
4	4	Vladimir Kramnik (RUS)	2785	+1
5	9	Vassily Ivanchuk (UKR)	2779	+15
6	5	Sergey Karjakin (RUS)	2776	0
7	6	Veselin Topalov (BUL)	2775	0
8	10	Hikaru Nakamura (USA)	2774	+23
9	8	Shakhriyar Mamedyarov (AZE)	2772	0
10	7	Alexander Grischuk (RUS)	2747	-26

- March 1 – Viswanathan Anand retakes the top spot in the FIDE World Rankings with an Elo rating of 2817. Hikaru Nakamura has the greatest rating increase, gaining 23 points to reach a rating of 2774. Alexander Grischuk (RUS) has the greatest rating decline, losing 26 points and falling to 2747.
- March 5 – Humpy Koneru (IND) wins the 6th FIDE Women's Grand Prix tournament, qualifying for the Women's World Chess Championship match with Hou Yifan (CHN).
- March 6 – Jan Smeets (NED) wins the 71st Noteboom Memorial tournament.
- March 7 – Sergei Tiviakov (NED) wins the 19th Fajr Open in Iran.
- March 9 – Gregory Kaidanov (USA) wins the Saint Louis Invitational, qualifying for the 2011 US Championship. Ray Robson (USA) finishes second, also qualifying.
- March 11 – Levon Aronian wins the Amber chess tournament in Monaco.
- March 14 – Irina Chelushkina (SRB) wins the 43rd Belgrade Women's International tournament.
- March 16 – Yuriy Kuzubov (UKR) wins the Reykjavik Open.
- March 19 – The chess team from the University of Texas – Dallas competes against six invited Grandmasters. The GM team wins the match by a score of 42.5-29.5.
- March 27 – Tigran L. Petrosian (ARM) wins the 5th George Agzamov Memorial tournament.

=== May ===
FIDE May 2011 Top Ten
Rank	Prev	Player	Rating	Chng
1	1	Viswanathan Anand (IND)	2817	0
2	2	Magnus Carlsen (NOR)	2815	0
3	3	Levon Aronian (ARM)	2808	0
4	4	Vladimir Kramnik (RUS)	2785	0
5	5	Vassily Ivanchuk (UKR)	2776	-3
6	6	Sergey Karjakin (RUS)	2776	0
7	7	Veselin Topalov (BUL)	2775	0
8	8	Hikaru Nakamura (USA)	2774	0
9	9	Shakhriyar Mamedyarov (AZE)	2772	0
10	11	Vugar Gashimov (AZE)	2760	+14

- May 1 – Viswanathan Anand remains the world number one. Alexander Grischuk falls out of the top 10, and is replaced by Vugar Gashimov (AZE).

=== July ===
FIDE July 2011 Top Ten
Rank	Prev	Player	Rating	Chng
1	2	Magnus Carlsen (NOR)	2821	+6
2	1	Viswanathan Anand (IND)	2817	0
3	3	Levon Aronian (ARM)	2805	-3
4	6	Sergey Karjakin (RUS)	2788	+12
5	4	Vladimir Kramnik (RUS)	2781	-4
6	8	Hikaru Nakamura (USA)	2770	-4
7	5	Vassily Ivanchuk (UKR)	2768	-8
8	7	Veselin Topalov (BUL)	2768	-7
9	9	Shakhriyar Mamedyarov (AZE)	2765	-7
10	11	Ruslan Ponomariov (UKR)	2764	+10

- July 1 – Magnus Carlsen is again the world number one. Vugar Gashimov falls out of the top 10, and is replaced by Ruslan Ponomariov (UKR).

=== September ===
FIDE September 2011 Top Ten
Rank	Prev	Player	Rating	Chng
1	1	Magnus Carlsen (NOR)	2823	+2
2	2	Viswanathan Anand (IND)	2817	0
3	3	Levon Aronian (ARM)	2807	+2
4	5	Vladimir Kramnik (RUS)	2791	+10
5	4	Sergey Karjakin (RUS)	2772	-16
6	8	Veselin Topalov (BUL)	2768	0
7	7	Vassily Ivanchuk (UKR)	2765	-3
8	10	Ruslan Ponomariov (UKR)	2758	-6
9	13	Alexander Grischuk (RUS)	2757	+9
10	15	Gata Kamsky (USA)	2756	+15

- September 1 – Magnus Carlsen remains the world number one. Hikaru Nakamura and Shakhriyar Mamedyarov fall out of the top 10, and are replaced by Alexander Grischuk and Gata Kamsky (USA).

=== November ===
FIDE November 2011 Top Ten
Rank	Prev	Player	Rating	Chng
1	1	Magnus Carlsen (NOR)	2826	+3
2	2	Viswanathan Anand (IND)	2811	-6
3	3	Levon Aronian (ARM)	2802	-5
4	4	Vladimir Kramnik (RUS)	2800	+9
5	13	Teimour Radjabov (AZE)	2781	+29
6	7	Vassily Ivanchuk (UKR)	2775	+10
7	6	Veselin Topalov (BUL)	2768	0
8	5	Sergey Karjakin (RUS)	2763	-9
9	17	Alexander Morozevich (RUS)	2762	+25
10	12	Hikaru Nakamura (USA)	2758	+5

- November 1 – Magnus Carlsen is again the world number one. Teimour Radjabov (AZE) surges from 13th to 5th with a ratings gain of 29 points. Alexander Morozevich (RUS) also makes a big leap, going from 17th to 9th with a ratings gain of 25 points. Hikaru Nakamura reenters the top 10. Ruslan Ponomariov, Alexander Grischuk, and Gata Kamsky fall out of the top 10.

== National champions ==
=== Armenia ===
- Men's – Robert Hovhannisyan
- Women's – Siranush Andriasian

=== Azerbaijan ===
- Men's – Nidjat Mamedov

=== Belarus ===
- Men's – Andrey Zhigalko
- Women's – Anna Sharevich

=== Bulgaria ===
- Women's – Darena Sikova

=== Chile ===
- Men's – Alvaro Valdes Escobar

=== Croatia ===
- Men's – Ante Brkić
- Women's – Borka Franciskovic

=== Georgia ===
- Women's – Maia Lomineishvili

=== Poland ===
- Men's – Mateusz Bartel
- Women's – Jolante Zawadzka

=== Romania ===
- Men's – Constantin Lupulescu
- Women's – Cristina Adela Foișor

=== Serbia ===
- Men's – Ivan Ivanišević

=== Turkey ===
- Men's – Emre Can

=== United States ===
- Men's – Gata Kamsky
- Women's – Anna Zatonskih

== Deaths ==
- February 12 – Mato Damjanović, Croatian and Yugoslav Grandmaster, dies at the age of 83.
