= 1999 in chess =

Events of 1999 in chess include the list of top chess players and news.

== Top players ==
FIDE top 10 players by Elo rating - January 1999;

1. Garry Kasparov Russia 2812
2. Viswanathan Anand India 2781
3. Vladimir Kramnik Russia 2751
4. Alexei Shirov Spain 2726
5. Alexander Morozevich Russia 2723
6. Michael Adams England 2716
7. Vasily Ivanchuk Ukraine 2714
8. Peter Svidler Russia 2713
9. Anatoly Karpov Russia 2710
10. Veselin Topalov Bulgaria 2700

== Chess news in brief ==
- The FIDE World Chess Championship is won by Alexander Khalifman in Las Vegas. Many leading players (including Garry Kasparov, Viswanathan Anand, Alexander Morozevich, Anatoly Karpov) boycott the event and there is talk of legal action against FIDE by Karpov.
- The proposed 'Ultimate Championship' between Kasparov and Anand is postponed when the sponsorship deal is withdrawn.
- FIDE's Women's World Chess Championship is won by Xie Jun, as she defeats Alisa Galliamova in the final. The proceedings are described as chaotic and unsatisfactory by the world press following Zsuzsa Polgar being stripped of her title and Galliamova defaulting in the Candidates Final.
- The Linares chess tournament is dominated by a rampant Kasparov (10½/14), 2½ clear points ahead of Kramnik and Anand (both 8/14).
- Kasparov wins at Sarajevo with 7/9, ahead of Evgeny Bareev and Alexei Shirov (both 6/9).
- Michael Adams (6/9) achieves a career-best tournament result, winning at Dos Hermanas ahead of Vladimir Kramnik (5½). Surprisingly, Anand is in joint last place (3½).
- Peter Leko (5/7) wins the Dortmund super-tournament, ahead of Kramnik (4½/7).
- At the annual Hoogovens tournament in Wijk aan Zee, Kasparov runs out the winner from Anand and Kramnik.
- The Frankfurt Giants takes the form of a 4-player, 4-round, all-play-all rapid event and is won by Kasparov, 1½ points ahead of Anand, Kramnik and Karpov.
- The European Team Chess Championship is held in Batumi, Georgia. Armenia take gold, Hungary silver and Germany bronze.
- An Advanced Chess Match between Vishwanathan Anand and Anatoly Karpov results in a crushing 5-1 victory for the Indian Grandmaster.
- Kasparov plays and wins an internet game against The World. The game is followed closely by the world media. Irina Krush wins much respect for her analysis and steering of the World side. Daniel King commentates on MSN.
- At the Melody Amber tournament in Monte Carlo, Kramnik is the overall winner, while Anand wins the 'rapid' section and Shirov the 'blindfold'.
- Pamplona is won by Alexander Morozevich, ahead of Michał Krasenkow and Loek van Wely.
- Konstantin Sakaev wins the Russian Chess Championship held in Moscow.
- Julian Hodgson wins his third British Chess Championship title in Scarborough, North Yorkshire. Harriet Hunt makes it her fourth victory in the Ladies event.
- Boris Gulko wins the Salt Lake City U. S. Chess Championship after a playoff. Anjelina Belakovskaia takes the Women's title.
- Joel Benjamin wins the Manhattan Chess Club Championship for the sixth time.
- The World Junior Chess Championship (Under 20) is won by Aleksandr Galkin in Yerevan, Armenia.
- The annual Groningen tournament contains a strong field of grandmasters. Sergei Tiviakov wins, ahead of Vadim Milov and Zoltán Almási. The women's event is headed by Natalia Zhukova, closely followed by Antoaneta Stefanova and Peng Zhaoqin. Armenia's Sergei Movsesian takes first place in the Open.
- Tony Miles (8½/13) wins the Capablanca Memorial in Havana, ahead of Suat Atalık and Lazaro Bruzon (both 8/13).
- Prominent Chess publisher Batsford (formerly B. T. Batsford) ceases business activities.
- Bobby Fischer gives a series of radio interviews in Baguio, Philippines. Much of the material is branded distasteful and offensive. Chess journalist Bobby Ang asks that listeners make some allowance for Fischer's state of mind following his recent losses; both his mother and sister had recently died and the U.S. authorities had auctioned all of his personal belongings and memorabilia.
- Tõnu Õim wins the 14th Correspondence Chess World Championship (1994–99).
- In Hungary, Judit Polgár loses a (30 minute) rapid match to Fritz 5.32 by a 2½-5½ score.
- Shredder wins the 9th World Chess Computer Championship in Paderborn, Germany.
- Eight-year-old David Howell defeats John Nunn in a blitz game at the 3rd Mind Sports Olympiad.
- FIDE, the governing body of international chess, celebrates its 75th anniversary. A number of FIDE's member federations, including Argentina, are excluded over the non-payment of fees.
- Alexander Baburin launches Coffee-break Chess, an online newspaper for chess fans and a forerunner to his Chess Today and Grandmaster Square ventures.

== Deaths ==
- Lodewijk Prins, Dutch chess master and arbiter - November 11
- Lembit Oll, Estonian Grandmaster and world top 50 player - May 17
- Ortvin Sarapu, "Mr New Zealand Chess", 20-time NZ chess champion – April 13
- Gary Koshnitsky, Australian Master - September 17
- Catharina Roodzant, three-time winner of the women's Dutch championship – February 24
- Ramchandra Sapre, former national champion of India and chess columnist - May 18
- Francisco José Pérez Pérez, Spanish/Cuban master – September 11
