= 2001 in chess =

Events in chess during the year 2001:

== Top players ==
FIDE top 10 players by Elo rating – October 2001;

1. Garry Kasparov Russia 2838
2. Vladimir Kramnik Russia 2809
3. Viswanathan Anand India 2770
4. Alexander Morozevich Russia 2742
5. Peter Leko Hungary 2739
6. Veselin Topalov Bulgaria 2733
7. Michael Adams England 2731
8. Vassily Ivanchuk Ukraine 2731
9. Evgeny Bareev Russia 2719
10. Loek van Wely Netherlands 2714

== Tournaments ==
Tournament	City	System	Dates	Players (2700+)	Winner	Runner-up
Corus Chess Tournament	(Netherlands) Wijk aan Zee	Round robin	13–28 Jan	14 (10)	(Russia) Garry Kasparov	(India) Viswanathan Anand
Corus Chess Tournament Group B	(Netherlands) Wijk aan Zee	Round robin	13–28 Jan	14 (0)	(Belgium) Mikhail Gurevich	(Azerbaijan) Teimour Radjabov
Women's World Chess Championship	(Russia) Moscow	Knockout	25 Nov – 14 Oct	64 (0)	(China) Zhu Chen	(Russia) Alexandra Kosteniuk
FIDE World Chess Championship	(Russia) Moscow	Knockout	27 Nov – 23 Jan 2002	128 (11)	(Ukraine) Ruslan Ponomariov	(Ukraine) Vasyl Ivanchuk

== Deaths ==
- Alexei Suetin, Russian chess grandmaster and chess author – September 10
- Claude Bloodgood, controversial American chess player, died in prison – August 4
- Tony Miles, English chess Grandmaster – 12 November
