= 2018 in chess =

Major chess events that took place in 2018 included the Candidates Tournament, won by Fabiano Caruana, who earned the right to challenge Magnus Carlsen in the World Chess Championship 2018. Magnus Carlsen won the match on tiebreaks and retained the title of World Chess Champion. There were two Women's World Chess Championship events; the first a match held in May between Ju Wenjun and Tan Zhongyi, won by Ju Wenjun, and the second, held in November, a 64-player knockout tournament where Ju Wenjun defended her title.

== 2018 tournaments ==
This is a list of 15 significant 2018 chess tournaments:

Tournament	System	Dates	Players (2700+)	Winner	Runner-up	Third
Tata Steel Chess Tournament	Round robin	12–28 Jan	14 (11)	(Norway) Magnus Carlsen	(Netherlands) Anish Giri	(Russia) Vladimir Kramnik
Gibraltar Chess Festival	Swiss	23 Jan – 1 Feb	276 (12)	(Armenia) Levon Aronian	(France) Maxime Vachier-Lagrave	(United States) Hikaru Nakamura
Candidates Tournament 2018	Round robin	10–28 Mar	8 (8)	(United States) Fabiano Caruana	(Azerbaijan) Shakhriyar Mamedyarov	(Russia) Sergey Karjakin
Grenke Chess Classic 2018	Round robin	31 Mar – 9 Apr	10 (7)	(United States) Fabiano Caruana	(Norway) Magnus Carlsen	(France) Maxime Vachier-Lagrave (Russia) Nikita Vitiugov
Shamkir Chess 2018	Round robin	18–28 Apr	10 (10)	(Norway) Magnus Carlsen	(China) Ding Liren	(Russia) Sergey Karjakin
Women's World Chess Championship 2018 (match)	Match	2–20 May	2 (0)	(China) Ju Wenjun	(China) Tan Zhongyi	—
Norway Chess 2018	Round robin	27 May – 7 Jun	10 (10)	(United States) Fabiano Caruana	(Norway) Magnus Carlsen	(United States) Hikaru Nakamura
Dortmund Sparkassen Chess Meeting 2018	Round robin	14–22 Jul	8 (5)	(Russia) Ian Nepomniachtchi	(Netherlands) Anish Giri	(Belarus) Vladislav Kovalev
Biel Chess Festival 2018	Round robin	22 Jul – 1 Aug	6 (5)	(Azerbaijan) Shakhriyar Mamedyarov	(Norway) Magnus Carlsen	(France) Maxime Vachier-Lagrave
Sinquefield Cup 2018	Round robin	18–28 Aug	10 (10)	(Norway) Magnus Carlsen (United States) Fabiano Caruana (Armenia) Levon Aronian	—	—
43rd Chess Olympiad (open event)	Swiss	23 Sep – 6 Oct	teams	China	United States	Russia
43rd Chess Olympiad (women event)	Swiss	23 Sep – 6 Oct	teams	China	Ukraine	Georgia
Women's World Chess Championship 2018 (tournament)	Knockout	2–23 Nov	64	(China) Ju Wenjun	(Russia) Kateryna Lagno	(Ukraine) Mariya Muzychuk (Russia) Alexandra Kosteniuk
World Chess Championship 2018	Match	9–28 Nov	2 (2)	(Norway) Magnus Carlsen	(United States) Fabiano Caruana	—
London Chess Classic 2018	Knockout	11–17 Dec	4 (4)	(United States) Hikaru Nakamura	(France) Maxime Vachier-Lagrave	(United States) Fabiano Caruana

== Transfer ==
Chessplayer	From which	Whither
José González García	Mexico	Spain
Boris Nikolov Chatalbashev	Bulgaria	Denmark
Alexei Shirov	Latvia	Spain

== Deaths ==
- Robert Abbott (2 March 1933 – 20 February 2018), American game designer and chess variant creator.
- Peggy Clarke (29 October 1937 – 15 September 2018), British Women's Champion in 1966.
- Roberto Luis Debarnot (5 August 1947 – 25 May 2018), Argentine International Master and three-time Olympian.
- Győző Forintos (30 July 1935 – 5 December 2018), Hungarian Grandmaster, chess writer and six-time Olympian.
- Giam Choo Kwee (7 May 1942 – 13 August 2018), Singaporean International Master, four-time Olympian, and two-time Singapore Chess Champion.
- Ruth Haring (23 January 1955 – 29 November 2018), American chess Woman International Master and five-time Olympian.
- Nino Khurtsidze (28 September 1975 – 22 April 2018), Georgian International Master and Woman Grandmaster, five-time Olympian, Georgian Champion in 1998, and five-time Georgian Women's Champion.
- Stefán Kristjánsson (8 December 1982 – 28 February 2018), Icelandic Grandmaster and five-time Olympian.
- Aloyzas Kveinys (9 July 1962 – 26 July 2018), Lithuanian Grandmaster and eight-time Olympian.
- Milunka Lazarević (1 December 1932 – 15 December 2018), Serbian chess player and journalist.
- Anatoly Lein (28 March 1931 – 1 March 2018), Soviet and American Grandmaster.
- Erwin Nievergelt (29 April 1929 – 4 August 2018), Swiss Olympian in 1954 and 1958.
- Eric Schiller (20 March 1955 – 3 November 2018), American FIDE Master and chess author.
- Philip Short (15 May 1960 – 31 August 2018), Irish FIDE Master and five-time Irish Champion.
- Evgeni Vasiukov (5 March 1933 – 10 May 2018), Soviet Grandmaster and 1995 World Senior Champion.
