= 1996 in chess =

Below is a list of events in chess in 1996, as well as the top ten FIDE rated chess players of that year.

== Top players ==
FIDE top 10 by Elo rating – January 1996

1. Vladimir Kramnik Russia 2775
2. Garry Kasparov Russia 2775
3. Anatoly Karpov Russia 2770
4. Vassily Ivanchuk Ukraine 2735
5. Gata Kamsky United States 2735
6. Viswanathan Anand India 2725
7. Veselin Topalov Bulgaria 2700
8. Boris Gelfand Belarus 2700
9. Alexei Shirov Spain 2690
10. Judit Polgár Hungary 2675

== Chess news in brief ==
- Anatoly Karpov defeats Gata Kamsky 10½-7½ in Elista, Kalmykia, to successfully defend his FIDE World Chess Championship Title. FIDE's suggestion of playing the match in Baghdad is dropped after protests are lodged.
- Zsuzsa Polgar defeats Xie Jun 8½-4½ in Spain, to win the Women's World Chess Championship.
- Garry Kasparov wins the double round robin, six-player tournament at Las Palmas. The tournament is one of the strongest of all time, with an average Elo rating of 2757.
- Kasparov defeats Deep Blue 4–2, despite losing the first game. As the (Philadelphia) contest progresses, he appears to get the measure of the IBM computer. The world media covers the match with an intense level of scrutiny.
- Veselin Topalov has a very successful year, including an outright win at the 3rd Lord Novgorod tournament with 6/10.
- Vladimir Kramnik and Topalov tie for first at Dos Hermanas with 6/9, ahead of Kasparov and Viswanathan Anand.
- The annual Wijk aan Zee Corus Tournament is won by Vassily Ivanchuk with 9/13, ahead of Anand (8) and Topalov (7½).
- Topalov and Kasparov win at Amsterdam (both 6½/9).
- Gelfand, Topalov and Karpov share success at Vienna (all 5½/9).
- The Moscow Grand Prix event is won by Kramnik and the Geneva Grand Prix event by Anand.
- Alexander Khalifman wins the Russian Chess Championship, held in Elista.
- The Yerevan Olympiad is won by Russia (38½/56), ahead of Ukraine on 35 and USA and England (both 34). Outstanding scorers include the gold medal-winning Mohammed Al-Modiahki of Qatar (8/10), Karen Asrian of Armenia (10/12) and Matthew Sadler of England (10½/13). Kasparov (7/9), Ivanchuk (8½/11) and Peter Svidler (8½/11) are among the top names that shine. The U.S. team is without Kamsky, but Alex Yermolinsky takes a silver medal for his board 2 (8/11) performance. There are 114 teams and some 665 players in attendance.
- The U.S. Chess Championship, held at Parsippany, New Jersey is won by Yermolinsky. Anjelina Belakovskaia wins the U.S. Women's Chess Championship.
- Yermolinsky and Alexander Goldin tie for first place at the Philadelphia World Open.
- GM Chris Ward wins the British Chess Championship, held in Nottingham. Harriet Hunt takes a second successive British Ladies title.
- Gabriel Schwartzman wins the U.S. Open Chess Championship, aged 19.
- Young Frenchman Étienne Bacrot proves he is already a formidable opponent, when he defeats former World Champion Vasily Smyslov by a match score of 5–1.
- Israeli Emil Sutovsky wins in Medellín to become the new World Junior Chess Champion.
- Ukrainian prodigy Ruslan Ponomariov wins the European Youth Chess Championship (Under 18 category), aged 12, held in Rimavská Sobota.
- Swedish GM Ulf Andersson gives a 310 board simultaneous display in Alvsjo, Sweden and wins 268, draws 40 and loses 2, in 15 hours and 23 minutes.
- Ex-world snooker champion Steve Davis is pronounced the new President of the British Chess Federation.

== Births ==
- March 25 – Richárd Rapport, youngest Hungarian GM (2010) and fifth youngest GM in history at age 13 years, 11 months, and 6 days
- April 18 – Daniil Dubov, Russian GM (2011)
- September 27 – Illia Nyzhnyk, Ukrainian GM (2011) who won the 2007 European Youth Chess Championship (Under 12 category) and narrowly missed out on the Under 12 World Youth title the same year, on tiebreak

== Deaths ==
- Vladimir Liberzon, Russian born Israeli Grandmaster – August 4
- Julio Bolbochán, Argentine Grandmaster and twice the national champion – June 28
- Yosef Porat, German born IM, many times the national champion of Israel and Palestine – ?
- Predrag Ostojic, Yugoslav (Serbian) Grandmaster, twice the national champion – July 5
- Victor Buerger, Latvian-British player, moderately successful in tournaments of the 1920s and 30s – ?
