= 2012 in chess =

Below is a list of events in chess in the year 2012:

== Events ==
- The film Brooklyn Castle is released on 11 March 2012. The movie documents Intermediate School 318, an inner-city public school in Brooklyn, New York, which becomes the first middle school team to win the United States Chess Federation's national high school championship.
- World champion Viswanathan Anand (India) successfully defends his title against challenger Boris Gelfand (Israel) in the World Chess Championship 2012 held in Moscow in May. The match is tied 6–6 after the first 12 games, but Anand scores +1=3−0 in the four rapid tie-break games to retain the title.
- The Spanish chess magazine Jaque publishes its final issue in July.
- 40th Chess Olympiad is held in Istanbul from 27 August to 10 September. In the open event, Armenia wins the gold, with Russia and Ukraine earning silver and bronze. The women's event is won by Russia, followed by China and Ukraine.
- The first two tournaments in the FIDE Grand Prix 2012–13 series are held. The Grand Prix will be used to qualify players for the World Chess Championship 2014. Veselin Topalov (Bulgaria), Boris Gelfand (Israel) and Shakhriyar Mamedyarov win London 2012 all scoring 7/12. Sergey Karjakin (Russia), Wang Hao (China) and Alexander Morozevich (Russia) win Tashkent 2012 all scoring 6½/12. Four more Grand Prix events will be held in 2013, and ultimately Topalov and Mamedyarov were the Grand Prix points qualifiers for the 2014 world championship.
- The Women's World Chess Championship 2012 is a 64-player knockout tournament held in Khanty Mansiysk, Russia from 10 November to 1 December. Anna Ushenina (Ukraine) wins the finals match against Antoaneta Stefanova (Bulgaria) to become the 2012 women's world champion. Stefanova is the 2004 women's champion, and Ushenina won the finals match 3½ to 2½ by winning the second rapid tie-break game after the four-game match ended 2–2 and the first rapid tie-break was drawn.
- The final three events in the FIDE Women's Grand Prix 2011–12 series are held. Koneru Humpy (India) and Anna Muzychuk (Slovenia) win the Kazan tournament in June with 7½/12. Koneru also wins the Ankara tournament in September with 8½/12. Hou Yifan wins the Jermuk tournament in July, and combined with her two first-place finishes in 2011 at Rostov and Shenzhen she qualified to face Anna Ushenina in the Women's World Chess Championship 2013.

== Deaths ==
- Emil Ungureanu, Romanian International Master.
- 7 January Elaine Pritchard, English Woman International Master, four-time winner of the British Women's Chess Championship, and five-time Olympian for the British women's team dies at age 86.
- 13 April Miguel Albareda Creus Spanish chess player, eight-time champion of Catalonia and 1958 Olympian for Spain, dies at age 93.
- 21 March Yuri Razuvaev Russian chess player and trainer, dies at age 66.
- 4 May Haukur Angantýsson Icelandic IM and winner of the 1976 Icelandic Chess Championship and 1979 World Open dies at age 63.
- 17 June Nathan Divinsky, Canadian chess player and writer, two-time Olympian for Canada, dies at age 86.
- 15 July Jacqueline Piatigorsky, chess player, patron, sculptor and author, dies at age 100.
- 14 August Svetozar Gligorić Serbian and Yugoslav Grandmaster dies in Belgrade at age 89.
- 11 September Rein Etruk three-time Estonian chess champion dies in Tallinn at age 74.
- 1 November Chen Zude, president of the Chinese Chess Association, dies at age 68.
- 18 November Elena Donaldson-Akhmilovskaya Soviet-born American Woman Grandmaster dies at age 55. Played in the Women's World Chess Championship 1986, losing to Maia Chiburdanidze.
- 3 December Georgy Borisenko, Soviet correspondence grandmaster and theoretician, dies at age 90.
