= 1972 in chess =

Events in chess in 1972;

== Top players ==
FIDE top 10 by Elo rating – July 1972

1. Bobby Fischer United States 2785
2. Boris Spassky Soviet Union 2660
3. Tigran Petrosian Soviet Union 2645
4. Lev Polugaevsky Soviet Union 2645
5. Viktor Korchnoi Soviet Union 2640
6. Lajos Portisch Hungary 2640
7. Anatoly Karpov Soviet Union 2630
8. Mikhail Botvinnik Soviet Union 2630
9. Mikhail Tal Soviet Union 2625
10. Bent Larsen Denmark 2625

== Chess news in brief ==
- Bobby Fischer defeats Boris Spassky in Reykjavík, to become the eleventh World Chess Champion. There are serious doubts as to whether Fischer will even turn up. His resolve remains in question throughout the early part of the match, amidst a barrage of disputes and demands. He plays badly in the first game and loses. The prospects look bleak when he fails to appear for the second game and is defaulted. From the third game onwards however, he quickly settles to his best form and outplays the defending champion, scoring seven wins, one loss and eleven draws. Officiated by Lothar Schmid, the match is pronounced a victory for the challenger, by a score of 12½–8½. Headline writers across the world follow the unfolding drama with great interest, sensationally describing the confrontation as "The Match of the Century", "East against West", "The introvert versus the extrovert". At the very least, the encounter ends twenty-five years of Soviet supremacy. Predictably, Fischer has his own, more extravagant claim—"It will probably be the greatest sports event in history. Bigger even than the Frazier-Ali fight". After the match, Fischer gains instant celebrity status and even appears on the Bob Hope Show. Subsequently, the popularity of chess reaches new heights in the western world and sales of chess sets rise to record levels.
- The Chess Olympiad at Skopje ends in victory for the USSR, scoring 42/60, with Hungary (40½/60) taking silver and Yugoslavia (38/60), the bronze team medals. Outstanding performances on board one come from Robert Hübner (gold), Vlastimil Hort (silver) and Walter Browne (bronze). A total of 444 players take part, representing 63 countries, although Albania withdraw after 10 rounds. For the first time, the Olympiad stages both Men's and Women's events concurrently at the same venue, although there is considerable disparity between the size of the two events—the Men's comprises teams of four bolstered by two reserves while the Women's can only support teams of two, with one reserve. The outcome of the Women's event once again favours the USSR (11½/14), ahead of Romania and Hungary (both 8/14).
- San Antonio hosts the Church's fried chicken tournament (named after its sponsor) at the Hotel Hilton Palacio del Rio. Newly crowned world champion Fischer and deposed champion Spassky are invited, but decline entry. Fischer confirms that the playing conditions meet with his approval, but he is less complimentary about the prize fund. The list of entrants is nevertheless world-class and proceedings result in a three-way tie between Tigran Petrosian, Lajos Portisch and Anatoly Karpov.(all 10½/15).
- Mikhail Tal recovers well from his poor health to dominate the Soviet Chess Championship with 15/21, ahead of Vladimir Tukmakov (13/21). He is also a winner at Sukhumi (11/15), ahead of Vladimir Savon (10½/15) and Mark Taimanov (10/15), but narrowly loses out (10½/13) to promising newcomer Mark Dvoretsky (11/13) at Viljandi.
- The IBM international chess tournament, held in Amsterdam is won by Lev Polugaevsky on 12/15, ahead of Viktor Korchnoi (11/15) and Wolfgang Uhlmann (9½/15). It is however fourth placed László Szabó who catches the eye of the chess writers, producing some fine, tactical games.
- Polugaevsky also wins at Kislovodsk (11/14), ahead of Leonid Stein (10/14) and Efim Geller (9/14).
- Top prize at Palma de Mallorca is shared three ways, between Oscar Panno, Jan Smejkal and Viktor Korchnoi (all 10/15).
- Bent Larsen is the victor at Teesside with 11/15, ahead of Ljubomir Ljubojević (10/15) and Lajos Portisch (9½/15).
- The Hastings International Chess Congress (1972/73 edition) is won by Bent Larsen with 11½/15, ahead of Wolfgang Uhlmann (11/15) and William Hartston (9½/15).
- Leonid Stein is triumphant at Zagreb with 9½/13, ahead of Mato Damjanović, Dražen Marović and Vlastimil Hort (all 8/13).
- Three players share the spoils at the Reykjavík International in Iceland. Home favourite Fridrik Olafsson is declared winner on tie-break from fellow grandmasters Florin Gheorghiu and Vlastimil Hort (all 11/15).
- Anatoly Lein wins the 9th Capablanca Memorial in Cienfuegos with 14/19, ahead of Igor Platonov (13/19) and Zoltán Ribli (12/19). It's a good year for Lein, who also triumphs at Novi Sad (12/15), ahead of Pal Benko (11/15) and Borislav Ivkov (9½/11).
- Svetozar Gligorić wins the 2nd Statham Masters in Lone Pine.
- A triple tie occurs at the U.S. Championship, held in New York City. Robert Byrne shares the honours with Lubomir Kavalek and Samuel Reshevsky (all 9/13). The tournament doubles as a zonal qualifier for the next cycle of the world championship. A play-off held nine months later confirms Byrne as the overall winner.
- Six teams compete for the winners' trophy at the Clare-Benedict Team Tournament in Vienna. The champions are West Germany (14½/20), ahead of Netherlands (13/20), Spain (10½/20), England (10/20), Switzerland (7/20) and Austria, the host nation (5/20). Robert Hübner posts the best score on board one (4½/5), while Wolfgang Unzicker and Jan Timman perform well on board two (both 4/5).
- Comins Mansfield, a renowned composer of chess problems is among the recipients of the first title awards for Grandmaster of chess composition. He thereby becomes England's first chess player with a GM title.
- Reginald Bonham (1906–1984) is awarded the first GM title for blind correspondence chess. Bonham founded the International Braille Chess Association in 1951 and won the first six World Blind Correspondence Chess Championships. He also won English county titles in over-the-board chess.
- After a period of imprisonment by the Communist authorities in Czechoslovakia, GM Luděk Pachman is finally allowed to leave the country. However, his exit to West Germany is made very costly, when he is forced to pay £750 ($1880) for passports for his family. He continues to protest to the United Nations about the Czech government's breaches of Human Rights legislation.

== Births ==
- Alexei Shirov, Soviet-Spanish GM, a world championship finalist and elite circuit player – July 4
- Loek van Wely, Dutch GM, six times the national champion – October 7
- Vadim Milov, Soviet-Israeli-Swiss GM, highly rated tournament player – August 1
- Alexei Fedorov, Soviet-Belarusian GM, former multiple national champion – September 27
- Hannes Stefánsson, Icelandic GM, former national champion – July 18
- Alisa Galliamova, Russian GM, former women's world championship finalist – January 18
- Ilya Gurevich, Soviet-American GM, former world junior champion – February 8
- Konstantin Landa, Soviet GM living in Germany, highly rated tournament player and trainer – May 22
- Victor Mikhalevski, Soviet-Belarusian-Israeli GM, highly rated tournament player – July 8
- Pablo Zarnicki, Argentine GM, Olympiad silver medallist – November 12
- Hichem Hamdouchi, Moroccan GM and one of the leading players from Africa – October 8
- Dimitri Reinderman, Dutch GM, runner-up in the national championship – August 12
- Tong Yuanming, Chinese IM, former national champion – April 21
- Jesse Kraai, U.S. GM, the first American-born player to achieve the title in ten years – May 6
- Ashot Nadanian, Armenian IM and respected trainer of top flight players – September 19

== Deaths ==
- Victor Soultanbeieff, Russian-Belgian chess master, five times the Belgian Champion – February 9
- Georgy Lisitsin, Soviet IM, three times Leningrad Champion – March 20
- Kazimierz Makarczyk, Polish chess master, former national champion – May 27
- Ado Kraemer, German chess master and problemist – June 25
- Sir George Thomas, English master, twice British Champion and an accomplished sportsman – July 23
- Kenneth Harkness, chess arbiter, organizer, and writer – October 4
- Mary Bain, Hungarian-American master, former women's world championship challenger – October 26
- Jerzy Lewi, Polish chess master, former national champion – October 30
- Gedali Szapiro, Polish-Israeli chess master, played for both countries in Olympiads – December 28
