= 1997 in chess =

Below is a list of events in chess in 1997, as well as the top ten FIDE rated chess players at the start of that year.

== Top players ==
FIDE top 10 players by Elo rating - January 1997

1. Garry Kasparov Russia 2795
2. Viswanathan Anand India 2765
3. Anatoly Karpov Russia 2760
4. Vladimir Kramnik Russia 2740
5. Vassily Ivanchuk Ukraine 2740
6. Veselin Topalov Bulgaria 2725
7. Gata Kamsky United States 2720
8. Boris Gelfand Belarus 2700
9. Alexei Shirov Spain 2690
10. Nigel Short England 2690

== Chess news in brief ==
- Viswanathan Anand wins FIDE's new knockout-style World Chess Championship qualifier in Groningen at the end of the year. He then has just 2 days before play commences with Anatoly Karpov for the world title in Lausanne.
- Alisa Galliamova-Ivanchuk wins the FIDE Women's Candidates Tournament in Groningen.
- Garry Kasparov loses to chess supercomputer Deeper Blue in a controversial rematch (2½-3½). Afterwards, IBM announce that they are scrapping the machine. The contest is subsequently made the subject of the 2003 documentary film Game Over: Kasparov and the Machine.
- Kasparov, Vladimir Kramnik, and Peter Svidler finish in a 3-way tie at the Fontys tournament, Tilburg (all 8/11).
- Kasparov wins a double round contest at Novgorod with a 6½/10 score and sweeps to victory at the Linares chess tournament by a score of 8½/11 (from Kramnik, 7½/11).
- Kramnik is the winner at Dortmund Sparkassen with 6½/11 (from Anand, 5½/11).
- The Investbanka Tournament, Belgrade is won by Anand and Vassily Ivanchuk (both 6/9).
- Anand and Kramnik share the honours at Dos Hermanas (both 6/9).
- Veselin Topalov and Alexei Shirov share victory at Madrid with 6½/9.
- Anand wins the 30th Biel Chess Festival in Switzerland (7/10).
- Valery Salov wins the Wijk aan Zee, Corus chess tournament with 8½/13.
- The European Team Chess Championship, held in Pula, is won by England, on tie-break from Russia. England's Matthew Sadler posts an outstanding 7/9 score, which echoes his performance at last year's Chess Olympiad. The bronze medal goes to Armenia. In the Women's event, Georgia take gold, from Romania (silver) and England (bronze).
- Alexander Shabalov wins the World Open, Philadelphia, scoring 8/9.
- Michael Adams and Sadler tie in the British Chess Championship held at Hove. Harriet Hunt is the Ladies Champion.
- Joel Benjamin wins the (Interplay) U.S. Chess Championship in Arizona. Esther Epstein wins the U.S. Women's Chess Championship.
- Alex Yermolinsky wins 98th U.S. Open in Orlando, Florida. (10½/12).
- Julian Hodgson wins the Canadian Open at Winnipeg.
- Grandmasters John Nunn, Mark Hebden and Eduardas Rozentalis tie for first at the Hastings International Chess Congress.
- Tal Shaked wins the World Junior Chess Championship held at Żagań in Poland. The girls' event is won by Harriet Hunt.
- Jānis Klovāns of Latvia wins the 7th World Senior Chess Championship, Germany. The victory earns him the GM title at age 62.
- Jonathan Mestel gains his Grandmaster title in Chess problem solving and becomes the first over-the-board (OTB) GM to do so.
- Étienne Bacrot becomes the youngest Grandmaster ever at 14 years, 2 months, but later in the year loses his record to Ruslan Ponomariov, who achieves the same at 14 years, 1 month.
- Luke McShane becomes an International Master at 13 years, 2 months.
- Jennifer Shahade becomes the youngest ever female U.S. Master at 15 years, 11 months.
- GM Joël Lautier marries Woman Grandmaster (WGM) Almira Skripchenko.
- The PCA rating list is published: Kasparov - 2827; Kramnik - 2774; Anand - 2765 ...
- The British Chess Variants Society is founded.

== Births ==
- February 8 – Suri Vaibhav, Indian GM (2012)

== Deaths ==
- February 2 – Erich Eliskases, leading Argentinian (formerly Austrian/German) Master of the 1930s and 40s
- February 16 – Alvis Vītoliņš, Latvian IM and seven times winner of the national championship
- July 4 – Miguel Najdorf, leading Argentinian (formerly Polish) Master and World Championship Candidate
- July 9 – Walter Korn, former U.N. Relief and Rehabilitation Administrator and renowned chess writer
