= 1992 in chess =

Below is a list of events in chess in 1992, as well as the top ten FIDE rated chess players of that year.

== Top players ==
FIDE top 10 by Elo rating - January 1992

1. Garry Kasparov Soviet Union 2780
2. Anatoly Karpov Soviet Union 2725
3. Vassily Ivanchuk Soviet Union 2720
4. Nigel Short England 2685
5. Viswanathan Anand India 2670
6. Boris Gelfand Soviet Union 2665
7. Alexei Shirov Latvia 2655
8. Gata Kamsky United States 2655
9. Artur Yusupov Soviet Union 2655
10. Valery Salov Soviet Union 2655

== Chess news in brief ==
- Nigel Short exceeds expectation by defeating Anatoly Karpov 6-4 in the Candidates' semi-final. In the other semi-final, Jan Timman defeats Artur Yusupov by the same score. Both matches are held in Linares, Spain.
- Bobby Fischer returns from twenty years of self-imposed exile, to play a match with Boris Spassky. The starting venue is Sveti Stefan, a small seaside resort in war-torn Yugoslavia (nowadays Montenegro). As the country is subject to UN sanctions, the US State Department forbids Fischer from playing and threatens him with heavy penalties. In defiance of the threats, Fischer plays the match and wins by a score of 10-5, with 15 draws. He earns prize money of $3.5 million, and is titled by the organisers the "Undefeated Champion of the World". The quality of play varies from game to game, but there are some glimpses of Fischer's former glory days. The match concludes in Belgrade.
- Boris Gelfand and Viswanathan Anand share victory at a strong tournament held in Moscow, each scoring 4½/7.
- Garry Kasparov wins the Trophée Immopar in Paris, including a first prize of more than $75,000. He defeats Anand in the final series of tie-break rapid games.
- Kasparov and Vassily Ivanchuk win at Dortmund.
- The prestigious Linares tournament sees Kasparov triumphant with 10/13, ahead of rivals, Ivanchuk and Timman (both 8/13).
- Anand (6/9) wins a strong Reggio Emilia tournament, held at the 1991/92 year end. Gelfand and Kasparov share second place on 5½/9.
- Victory at the double-round robin Amsterdam tournament goes to Anand and Short with 3½/6.
- Another double-round robin tournament is held at Biel. Karpov wins with an impressive 10½/14, whereas Alexei Shirov manages only 5½ points, a poor return for a young man rising rapidly through the world's top 10 rankings.
- Michael Adams wins the Tilburg knockout event.
- The Women's Interzonal in Shanghai is won by Zsuzsa Polgar, with Nana Ioseliani in second place.
- The 30th Chess Olympiad, held in Manila, attracts 102 teams, including Philippines A, B and C. The event is dominated by a strong Russian team scoring 39/56, a full four points ahead of Uzbekistan (35/56) and Armenia (34/56). Kasparov's 8½/10 is eclipsed only by the performance of exciting new prospect Vladimir Kramnik, as he scores 8½/9 to take an individual gold medal as first reserve. His tournament rating performance of 2958 (Elo) earns him another gold medal, despite having not yet earned the International Master title. Uzbekistan's second place is a complete surprise, particularly as they have no world-class players, yet it seems that the break-up of the Soviet Union may have the opposite effect to that predicted by many chess commentators. It was widely assumed that western nations would be the beneficiaries of greater medal prospects, but few pundits had stopped to consider the latent strength of each of the states that made up the former Union. In the women's event, Georgia (30½/42) predictably dominate (it was the home country of most of the USSR's top women players), ahead of Ukraine (29/42) and China (28½/42). China are led by Women's World Chess Champion Xie Jun, whereas the Hungarian team, despite finishing fourth, contains none of the Polgar sisters.
- Unusually, the European Team Chess Championship (ETC) coincides with an Olympiad year. The event, held in Debrecen, is another resounding success for Russia, with Kasparov and Kramnik again topping the performance table, ahead of Adams. Final result: Russia 25/36 (gold), Ukraine 22½/36 (silver) and England 21½/36 (bronze). Notably, Debrecen also plays host to the inaugural Women's European Team Championship, which runs alongside the main competition. The winners are Ukraine (13½/18), turning the tables on Georgia (13/18), with Azerbaijan (12½/18) taking third place. The runaway star of the event is Ukraine's Alisa Galliamova, with a rating performance of 2689. Galliamova is married to GM Vassily Ivanchuk, although they later separate.
- The first Melody Amber tournament is held at Roquebrune-Cap-Martin, France, and is won by Ivanchuk. An exciting new entry to the chess calendar, the tournament quickly develops into a major attraction for the world's elite players, due to its glamorous setting (from 1993, Monte Carlo) and generous prize money. Starting life as a rapidplay event, the organisers later add a rapidplay 'blindfold' section to make it a unique, dual format event with a demanding, but entertaining schedule.
- Anand plays a match against Ivanchuk in Linares. There is considerable media interest, as both are seen as prospective future world champions. Anand is the victor by a score of 5-3.
- Patrick Wolff wins the US Chess Championship, held in Durango.
- Gregory Kaidanov has a good year, celebrating double success at the US Open in Dearborn and the World Open in Philadelphia.
- John Fedorowicz wins the National Open in Las Vegas.
- The World Youth Chess Championship takes place in Duisburg, Germany. Konstantin Sakaev takes gold in the Boys Under-18 contest, while Almira Skripchenko wins the Under-16 Girls and Luke McShane takes the Under-10 Boys' title at the age of eight.
- Efim Geller wins the World Senior Championship, held at Bad Wörishofen.

== Births ==
- Fabiano Caruana, Italian-American prodigy, youngest ever GM from Italy or the USA - July 30
- Lara Stock, Croatian prodigy, a WGM and former World Girls U-10 Champion - May 26
- Gauri Shankar, Indian prodigy, British U-10 Champion aged seven - October 1

== Deaths ==
- Mikhail Tal, Latvian Grandmaster and the eighth World Chess Champion (1960–61) - June 28
- Samuel Reshevsky, US Grandmaster, six-time national champion and World Championship Candidate - April 4
- Vladas Mikėnas, Lithuanian IM, honorary GM and chess journalist - November 3
- Leopold Mitrofanov, Russian IM, chess composer and International Judge of chess composition - November 26
- Imre Konig, Hungarian IM who also lived in Austria, England and the USA - September 9
- Arpad Elo, Hungarian chess master, Physicist and inventor of the Elo rating system - November 5
