= 2010 in chess =

Events in chess during the year 2010:

== Events ==
- The British Chess Variants Society disbands.
- Variant Chess ceases publication.
- Viswanathan Anand beats Veselin Topalov in the World Chess Championship 2010, thus retaining the title of World Chess Champion.
