= 2014 in chess =

Events in chess during the year 2014 included the World Chess Championship and the Chess Olympiad.

The World Chess Championship 2014 was a match between the world champion Magnus Carlsen and challenger Viswanathan Anand, to determine the World Chess Champion. It was held from 7 to 25 November 2014, under the auspices of the World Chess Federation (FIDE) in Sochi, Russia, and Carlsen was the favorite. Anand had a lucky opening by picking the white pieces, but after 11 games, Carlson won.

== Major tournaments ==
- World Chess Championship 2014
- 41st Chess Olympiad
- Women's World Chess Championship 2014
- 2014 European Individual Chess Championship
- FIDE Grand Prix 2014–15
- FIDE Women's Grand Prix 2013–14
- Norway Chess 2014
- Shamkir Chess
- Sinquefield Cup 2014
- Zurich Chess Challenge 2014
