= 1969 in chess =

The following events in chess occurred in the year 1969.

== Top players ==
Provisional FIDE top 10 by Elo rating - 1969

1. Bobby Fischer United States 2720
2. Boris Spassky Soviet Union 2690
3. Viktor Korchnoi Soviet Union 2680
4. Mikhail Botvinnik Soviet Union 2660
5. Tigran Petrosian Soviet Union 2650
6. Bent Larsen Denmark 2630
7. Efim Geller Soviet Union 2620
8. Lajos Portisch Hungary 2620
9. Paul Keres Soviet Union 2610
10. Lev Polugaevsky Soviet Union 2610

== Chess news in brief ==
- Boris Spassky defeats Tigran Petrosian 12½-10½ in Moscow, to become the tenth World Chess Champion. In an otherwise close contest, it is generally believed that Spassky's greater ambition and superior tactical awareness give him the edge. In game 19, he wins against the defending Champion's Sicilian Defence in just 24 moves.
- The World Junior Championship is held in Stockholm and the chess world witnesses the emergence of a future star in young Anatoly Karpov. He takes the title by three clear points with 10/11, and enjoys a run of eight straight wins. Andras Adorjan leads the following pack and has his own moment of glory at the European Junior Championship at Groningen, where he is a clear winner.
- At Lugano in 1968, Professor Arpad Elo (Milwaukee), Folke Rogard (FIDE President), Dr. Dorazil (Austria) and GM Svetozar Gligorić, formed a (FIDE) sub-committee charged with creating an internationally compatible rating system. Such a system could be used to judge the comparative strength of players and provide a fairer basis upon which 'master titles' would be awarded. Upon completion of their task, the newly conceived Elo rating system is used to make sense of the many game results collected from January 1966 to May 1969. The resulting, provisional 'world list' comprises the top 10 players (given above) and further includes ... Smyslov, Stein, Tal (all 2610); Olafsson, Kholmov (both 2600); Bronstein, Furman, Gligoric, Hort, Najdorf, Taimanov (all 2590); Gipslis, Krogius (both 2580); Evans, Lein, Reshevsky, Vasiukov (all 2570); Antoshin, Lutikov, Matulovic, Savon, Suetin, Unzicker, Zaitsev A. (all 2560) ...
- Petrosian wins the 37th Soviet Championship after a (1970) play-off with Lev Polugaevsky, both players having finished with 14/22. The tournament doubles up as a zonal qualifier for the next cycle of the World Championship. Fellow qualifiers are Efim Geller, Vasily Smyslov and Mark Taimanov; they all progress to next year's Interzonal tournament. Mikhail Tal awaits an operation to remove a kidney and understandably struggles to finish 'off the pace', with 10½/22.
- The winner of the Raach zonal tournament is Wolfgang Uhlmann with 15½/21, a full two points clear of the field, which includes Ulf Andersson, Jan Smejkal, Borislav Ivkov and Lajos Portisch (all 13½/21).
- Bent Larsen wins at Palma de Mallorca with 12/17, from Petrosian (11½/17). It's an impressive win for the Danish GM, given that the line-up also contains Viktor Korchnoi, Vlastimil Hort and Boris Spassky.
- Mikhail Botvinnik and Geller share victory at Wijk aan Zee with 10½/15, ahead of Portisch and Paul Keres (both 10/15).
- Korchnoi and Alexei Suetin are joint winners of the Capablanca Memorial in Havana. Their score of 11/15, narrowly edges out Svetozar Gligorić on 10½/15.
- Lajos Portisch wins at Amsterdam with 11½/15, at Monte Carlo (with Smyslov, 8/11) and at Hastings (1969/70 edition), scoring 6/9, ahead of Hort, Gligoric and Uhlmann.
- Jonathan Penrose extends his record number of British Championship wins to ten at Rhyl in Wales. The Championships also feature exciting future prospects Michael Stean, winner of the Under-16 event and Jonathan Speelman, the winner at Under-14 level.
- In America, Samuel Reshevsky is also making history. His U.S. Championship win echoes all the way back to 1936 when he won the first ever (tournament style) national championship. With this, his eighth win, he equals Bobby Fischer's previous record achievement.
- The Women's Chess Olympiad, held in Lublin, is thoroughly dominated by the USSR team with a near perfect 26/28, ahead of Hungary (20½/28) and Czechoslovakia (19/28).
- Ulf Andersson, at just eighteen years, wins his first Swedish Championship.
- Ludek Pachman, Czechoslovak chess player, writer and political activist is imprisoned for a considerable time on unspecified charges, following his constant campaigning against the Communist occupation of his homeland. At one point he goes on hunger strike and is dangerously close to death. Much later, he is allowed to immigrate to West Germany.
- Publishers Simon & Schuster (New York) and Faber and Faber (London) release Bobby Fischer's My 60 Memorable Games. Reviewers hail it as one of the most important chess books in modern times. It is particularly praised for the candour of the commentary and the expert quality of the analysis.
- The first ever national championship is contested in Japan.
- U.S. magazines Chess Life and Chess Review merge to form Chess Life & Review. It remains in this format from 1969 until 1980, when it reverts to Chess Life.
- The veteran Fritz Samisch, a much respected player in his day, participates at the Busum tournament and loses all fifteen of his games on time.

== Births ==
- Viswanathan Anand, Indian GM, twice the World Champion in 2000 and 2007 - December 11
- Vassily Ivanchuk, Ukrainian GM and former European Champion and World Blitz Champion - March 18
- Susan Polgar, U.S./Hungarian GM and former Women's World Champion - April 19
- Alexei Dreev, Russian GM, twice the World Youth Champion at Cadet/Under 16 level - January 30
- Jeroen Piket, Dutch GM (retired) and a four-time winner of the national championship - January 27
- Gregory Serper, U.S./Soviet GM and former winner of the World Open - September 14
- Thomas Luther, German GM and three times the national champion - November 4
- Wu Shaobin, Chinese GM and winner of the championship of Singapore in 2003 and 2005 - February 4
- Svetlana Matveeva, Russian WGM and IM. Many times the USSR and Russian Women's Champion - July 4
- Aaron Summerscale, English GM and British Rapidplay Champion in 2000 - August 26
- Ildikó Mádl, Hungarian WGM and IM. Former World and European Junior Girls' Champion - November 5
- Anjelina Belakovskaia, U.S./Ukrainian WGM and IM. Three times the U.S. Women's Champion - May 17
- Olav Sepp, Estonian IM and six times the winner of the national championship - May 5
- Stuart Rachels, U.S. International Master and a former national champion - September 26

== Deaths ==
- Alexander Tolush, Soviet-Russian GM, renowned journalist and trainer of Spassky and Keres - March 3
- Alexey Sokolsky, Soviet theoretician, former Correspondence Champion of the USSR - December 27
- Kurt Richter, German IM, theoretician, writer and former Champion of Berlin - December 29
- Joao de Souza Mendes, seven times the national champion of Brazil - July 10
- Walter Henneberger, Swiss Master and four times the national champion - January 15
- Leonids Dreibergs, Latvian-American Master, twice the winner of the Michigan Championship - April 6
- Otto Löwenborg, leading Swedish Master of the early 20th Century - December ?
