= 1902 in chess =

Below is a list of events in chess in the year 1902:

== News ==
- Géza Maróczy (Hungary) wins the Monte Carlo tournament, ahead of Harry Pillsbury (United States) and Dawid Janowski (France).
- March 14–15 – The United States team wins the Anglo-American cable match 5½–4½. Harry Pillsbury and Frank Marshall are in Europe to play at Monte Carlo, so they traveled to London to play their games in person.
- Janowski wins the German Open Championship, followed by Pillsbury and Henry Ernest Atkins (Great Britain).
- Karl Schlechter (Austria) defeats Janowski in match at Karlsbad by the score 7½–2½.

== Births ==
- Eduard Glass (died after 1980), Austrian master and 1929 Austrian co-champion with Erich Eliskases
- Ludwig Schmitt (1902–1980), German chess master
- January 16 – Róża Herman (1902–1995), Polish chess player, is born in Łódź
- February 20 – Virgilio Fenoglio (1902–1990), Argentine master, is born in Santa Fe
- March 16 – Mario Monticelli (1902–1995), Italian IM (1950) and GME (1985), is born in Venice
- June 5 – Georg Kieninger (1902–1975), German International Master (1950), is born in Munich
- July 27 – Teodors Bergs (1902–1966), Latvian master, is born in Riga
- August 5 – Rudolf Pitschak (1902–1988), Czech–German master, is born in Rumburk
- October 15 – María Teresa Mora (1902–1980), Cuban Woman International Master (1950), is born in Havana
- December 3 – Feliks Kibbermann (1902–1993), Estonian master, is born in Rakvere
- December 6 – G. H. Diggle (1902–1993), British chess player and writer, is born in Moulton, Lincolnshire, England

== Deaths ==
- Samuel Rosenthal, Polish-French master and chess writer, dies Neuilly-sur-Seine, France, at age 65
- June 15 – Stanislaus Sittenfeld, Polish-French master, dies in Davos, Switzerland, at age 36
- December 28 – Hieronim Czarnowski, Polish master and activist, dies at age 68
