= 2004 in chess =

Events in chess in 2004:

== Deaths ==
- April 30 – Kazimierz Plater (1915–2004), 89, Polish International Master and several time Polish champion.
- August 3 – Bryon Nickoloff (1956–2004), 48, Canadian International Master.
- August 22 – Konstantin Aseev (1960–2004), 43, Russian Grandmaster and trainer.
- September 18 – Michael Valvo (1942–2004), 62, American International Master.
- December 28 – Charles Bent (1919–2004), 85, English endgame study composer.
