= Khanty-Mansiysk State Medical Academy =

Education organization in Khanty-Mansiysk, Russia

- Russian: Ханты-Мансийская государственная медицинская академия
- Former name: Khanty-Mansiysk State Medical Institute
- Type: public
- Established: 1999
- Rector: Vladimir Yanin
- Location: 40 Mira Street, Khanty-Mansiysk, Khanty-Mansi Autonomous Okrug, Russia; 61°00′23″N 69°01′48″E
- Campus: urban
- Website: hmgma.ru

The Khanty-Mansiysk State Medical Academy (KhMSMA; Russian: Ханты-Мансийская государственная медицинская академия, ХМГМА) is a public higher medical school in Khanty-Mansiysk, Russia.

== History ==
In 1994, in accordance with the Decree of the head of the administration of the Khanty-Mansi Autonomous Okrug, the District Medical College was established in Khanty-Mansiysk to train medical specialists.

In 1999, Khanty-Mansiysk State Medical Institute was established on the basis of the college by order of the governor of the district. The medical scientist, Academician of the Russian Academy of Sciences Sergey Solovyov was one of its founders and the first rector. In 2001, the Institute received a license to conduct education in the specialty of higher professional education from the Ministry of Education of the Russian Federation. In 2004, postgraduate courses were opened in the specialties of researchers "Internal Diseases" and "Surgery", as well as internship and clinical residency in surgery, therapy, obstetrics and gynecology.

In 2005, the institute was reorganized: the oldest educational institution of the region, founded in 1934, the medical college, was attached. In December 2009, due to the results of the examination, the institute was upgraded to the status of an academy and was renamed to the Khanty-Mansiysk State Medical Academy.

== Education ==
In the academy the education process is organized at three faculties:

- General Medicine Faculty,
- Faculty of Secondary Medical Education,
- Faculty of Additional Education.

The academy has two academic buildings with departments of biomedical, natural science, social and humanitarian profiles, educational and scientific laboratories. Clinical departments are located in the medical and preventive institutions of Khanty-Mansiysk: the District Clinical Hospital, the District Clinical Hospital for Rehabilitation Treatment, specialized dispensaries.
