= 2021 in chess =

The 2021 chess calendar was again disrupted by the COVID-19 pandemic, and because of this many chess OTB tournaments were stopped, but major events that took place included the Tata Steel Chess Tournament, won by Jorden van Foreest.

The Candidates Tournament 2020–21, disrupted by the pandemic, concluded on 27 April 2021. It was won by Ian Nepomniachtchi.

In November, Nepomniachtchi subsequently faced defending champion Magnus Carlsen for the World Chess Championship title in Dubai, UAE during Expo 2020. Carlsen won the match 7 1/2–3 1/2 to retain the title with three games to spare and become a five-time world champion.

The International Chess Federation, FIDE, admitted four new member federations: Dominica, St. Vincent and Grenadines, Niger, and Belize.

== 2021 tournaments ==
This is a list of significant 2021 chess tournaments:

=== Supertournaments ===
Tournament	System	Dates	Players (2700+)	Winner	Runner-up	Third
Tata Steel Chess Tournament 2021	Round robin	15–31 Jan	14 (8)	(Netherlands) Jorden van Foreest	(Netherlands) Anish Giri	(Russia) Andrey Esipenko
Champions Chess Tour Opera Euro Rapid 2021	Hybrid	6–14 Feb	16 (14)	(United States) Wesley So	(Norway) Magnus Carlsen	(Azerbaijan) Teimour Radjabov
Champions Chess Tour Magnus Carlsen Invitational	Hybrid	13–21 Mar	16 (12)	(Netherlands) Anish Giri	(Russia) Ian Nepomniachtchi	(Norway) Magnus Carlsen
2020–2021 Candidates Tournament	Double round robin	17–25 Mar 2020 and 19–27 Apr	8 (7)	(Russia) Ian Nepomniachtchi	(France) Maxime Vachier-Lagrave	(Netherlands) Anish Giri
Champions Chess Tour New In Chess Classic	Hybrid	24 Apr – 2 May	16 (12)	(Norway) Magnus Carlsen	(United States) Hikaru Nakamura	(Azerbaijan) Shakhriyar Mamedyarov
Chess World Cup 2021	Single-elimination tournament	12 Jul – 6 Aug	206 (25)	(Poland) Jan-Krzysztof Duda	(Russia) Sergey Karjakin	(Norway) Magnus Carlsen
Women's Chess World Cup 2021	Single-elimination tournament	12 Jul – 3 Aug	103 (-)	(Russia) Alexandra Kosteniuk	(Russia) Aleksandra Goryachkina	(China) Tan Zhongyi
Sinquefield Cup	Round robin	17–27 Aug	12 (12)	Maxime Vachier-Lagrave	Fabiano Caruana; Leinier Domínguez; Wesley So	-
World Chess Championship 2021	Best-of-14 match, with tie breaks	24 Nov – 16 Dec	2	(Norway) Magnus Carlsen	(Russia) Ian Nepomniachtchi	-

=== FIDE Events ===
Tournament	City	System	Dates	Players	Winner	Runner-up	Third
FIDE Grand Swiss	(Latvia) Riga	Swiss	27 Oct – 7 Nov	154	(France) Alireza Firouzja	(United States) Fabiano Caruana	(Russia) Grigoriy Oparin
World Rapid Chess Championship	(Poland) Warsaw	Swiss	26–28 Dec	204	(Uzbekistan) Nodirbek Abdusattorov	(Russia) Ian Nepomniachtchi	(Norway) Magnus Carlsen
World Blitz Chess Championship	(Poland) Warsaw	Swiss	29–30 Dec	206	(France) Maxime Vachier-Lagrave	(Poland) Jan-Krzysztof Duda	(France) Alireza Firouzja
Women's World Rapid Chess Championship	(Poland) Warsaw	Swiss	26–28 Dec	102	Alexandra Kosteniuk	(Kazakhstan) Bibisara Assaubayeva	Valentina Gunina
Women's World Blitz Chess Championship	(Poland) Warsaw	Swiss	29–30 Dec	105	(Kazakhstan) Bibisara Assaubayeva	Alexandra Kosteniuk	Valentina Gunina

=== Team events ===
Tournament	City	System	Dates	Teams	Winner	Runner-up	Third
Women's World Team Chess Championship	(Spain) Sitges	Round robin	26 Sep – 3 Oct	10	Russia	India	Georgia
European Team Chess Championship	(Slovenia) Čatež ob Savi	Round robin	11–22 Nov	40	Ukraine	France	Poland
Women's European Team Chess Championship	(Slovenia) Čatež ob Savi	Round robin	11–22 Nov	32	Russia	Georgia	Azerbaijan

=== Rapid & Biltz Tournaments ===
Tournament	City	System	Dates	Players	Winner	Runner-up	Third
Superbet Rapid & Blitz	(Romania) Bucharest	Round robin	3–15 Jun	10	(Azerbaijan) Shakhriyar Mamedyarov	(Russia) Alexander Grischuk; Wesley So; Levon Aronian	-
Paris Rapid & Blitz	(France) Paris	Round robin	20–24 Jun	10	Wesley So	Ian Nepomniachtchi	Alireza Firouzja
Croatia Rapid & Blitz	(Croatia) Zagreb	Round robin	7–11 Jul	10	Maxime Vachier-Lagrave	Viswanathan Anand	Anish Giri
Saint Louis Rapid & Blitz	(United States) St. Louis	Round robin	11–16 Aug	10	Hikaru Nakamura	Fabiano Caruana	Richard Rapport
Shamkir Chess	(Azerbaijan) Shamkir	Round robin	17–24 Dec	10 (10)	(United States) Fabiano Caruana	(Hungary) Richard Rapport	(Azerbaijan) Shakhriyar Mamedyarov

== Deaths ==
- 14 January – Yrjö Rantanen
- 15 January – Gildardo García
- 18 January – Lubomir Kavalek
- 13 March – Nikola Spiridonov
- 1 June – Román Hernández Onna
- 1 July – Yury Dokhoian
- 28 July – István Csom
- 18 August – Evgeny Sveshnikov
- 11 October – Boris Pineda
- 14 November – Marek Vokáč
- 19 December – Boško Abramović
- 31 December – Gábor Kállai
