= 2022 in chess =

== 2022 tournaments ==
=== Supertournaments ===
Tournament	City	System	Dates	Players (2700+)	Winner	Runner-up	Third
Tata Steel Masters	(Netherlands) Wijk aan Zee	Round robin	15–31 Jan	14 (12)	(Norway) Magnus Carlsen	(Azerbaijan) Shakhriyar Mamedyarov	(Hungary) Richard Rapport
Tata Steel Challengers	(Netherlands) Wijk aan Zee	Round robin	15–31 Jan	14 (0)	(India) Arjun Erigaisi	(Czech Republic) Thai Dai Van Nguyen	(Denmark) Jonas Buhl Bjerre
Superbet Chess Classic	(Romania) Bucharest	Round robin	3–15 May	10 (9)	Maxime Vachier-Lagrave	Wesley So	Levon Aronian
Norway Chess	(Norway) Stavanger	Round robin	30 May – 12 Jun	10 (9)	(Norway) Magnus Carlsen	(Azerbaijan) Shakhriyar Mamedyarov	(India) Viswanathan Anand
Prague Chess Festival	(Czech Republic) Prague	Round robin	7–18 Jun	10 (6)	(India) Pentala Harikrishna	(Vietnam) Le Quang Liem	(Czech Republic) Thai Dai Van Nguyen (United States) Sam Shankland (Czech Republic) David Navara
2022 Candidates Tournament	(Spain) Madrid	Double round robin	16 Jun – 8 Jul 20	8 (8)	(FIDE) Ian Nepomniachtchi	(China) Ding Liren	(Azerbaijan) Teimour Radjabov
Biel Chess Festival	(Switzerland) Biel	Round robin	11–23 Jul	8 (2)	(Vietnam) Le Quang Liem	(FIDE) Andrey Esipenko	(India) Gukesh D
Dortmund Sparkassen Chess Meeting	(Germany) Dortmund	Round robin	16–25 Jul	4 (1)	(Germany) Dmitrij Kollars	(India) Viswanathan Anand	(England) Michael Adams
Sinquefield Cup	(United States) St. Louis	Round robin	1–16 Sep	10 (10)	(France) Alireza Firouzja	(FIDE) Ian Nepomniachtchi	(United States) Wesley So (United States) Fabiano Caruana

=== Open events ===
Tournament	City	System	Dates	Players	Winner	Runner-up	Third
Gibraltar Chess Festival	Gibraltar	Swiss	24 Jan – 4 Feb	22	(Algeria) Bilel Bellahcene (Hungary) Balazs Csonka	–	(Ukraine) Mariya Muzychuk (England) Ravi Haria (Italy) Sabino Brunello
Reykjavik Open	(Iceland) Reykjavík	Swiss	6–13 Apr	238	(India) R Praggnanandhaa	(Netherlands) Max Warmerdam (Denmark) Mads Andersen (Iceland) Hjorvar Steinn Gretarsson (United States) Abhimanyu Mishra	–
Paracin Open	(Serbia) Paracin	Swiss	8–16 Jul	160	(India) R Praggnanandhaa	(FIDE) Alexandr Predke	(Kazakhstan) Alisher Suleymenov (India) Muthaiah AL

=== FIDE events ===
Tournament	City	System	Dates	Players	Winner	Runner-up	Third
FIDE Grand Prix Berlin	(Germany) Berlin	Knockout	4–17 Feb	16	(United States) Hikaru Nakamura	(United States) Levon Aronian	(Hungary) Richard Rapport (United States) Leinier Domínguez
FIDE Grand Prix Belgrade	(Serbia) Belgrade	Knockout	1–14 Mar	16	(Hungary) Richard Rapport	Dmitry Andreikin (FIDE)	Anish Giri (NED); Maxime Vachier-Lagrave (FRA)
FIDE Grand Prix Berlin	(Germany) Berlin	Knockout	22 Mar – 4 Apr	16	(United States) Wesley So	(United States) Hikaru Nakamura	Amin Tabatabaei (IRI); Shakhriyar Mamedyarov (AZE)
World Rapid Chess Championship	(Kazakhstan) Almaty	Swiss	26–28 Dec	178	(Norway) Magnus Carlsen	(Germany) Vincent Keymer	(United States) Fabiano Caruana
World Blitz Chess Championship	(Kazakhstan) Almaty	Swiss	29–30 Dec	176	(Norway) Magnus Carlsen	(United States) Hikaru Nakamura	(Armenia) Haik M. Martirosyan

=== 2023–25 World Championship cycle qualification events ===
Tournament	City	System	Dates	Players	Winner	Runner-up	Third
European Individual Championship	(Slovenia) Brežice	Swiss	27 Mar – 6 Apr	317	(Germany) Matthias Blübaum	(Armenia) Gabriel Sargissian	(Croatia) Ivan Šarić
American Continental Championship	(El Salvador) San Salvador	Swiss	2–10 May	117	(United States) Timur Gareyev	(United States) Christopher Yoo	(Cuba) Yasser Quesada Pérez

=== Team events ===
Tournament	City	System	Dates	Teams	Winner	Runner-up	Third
44th Chess Olympiad (open event)	(India) Chennai	Swiss	26 Jul – 9 Aug	188	Uzbekistan	Armenia	India-2
44th Chess Olympiad (women event)	(India) Chennai	Swiss	26 Jul – 9 Aug	162	Ukraine	Georgia	India
2022 FIDE World Team Championship	(Israel) Jerusalem	Groups and play-offs	20–25 Nov	12	China	Uzbekistan	Spain

=== Rapid and blitz tournaments ===
Tournament	City	System	Dates	Players	Winner	Runner-up	Third
Poland Rapid & Blitz	(Poland) Warsaw	Round robin	17–24 May	10	Jan-Krzysztof Duda	Levon Aronian; Viswanathan Anand	–
Croatia Rapid & Blitz	(Croatia) Zagreb	Round robin	18–25 Jul	10	Magnus Carlsen	Maxime Vachier-Lagrave (France) Alireza Firouzja	–
Saint Louis Rapid & Blitz	(United States) Saint Louis	Round robin	24–31 Aug	10	(France) Alireza Firouzja	(United States) Hikaru Nakamura	(France) Maxime Vachier-Lagrave (United States) Fabiano Caruana
Norway Chess Blitz	(Norway) Stavanger	Round robin	30–31 May	10	(United States) Wesley So	(Norway) Magnus Carlsen	(Netherlands) Anish Giri (India) Viswanathan Anand (Azerbaijan) Shakhriyar Mamedyarov

== Deaths ==
- 24 January – Mark Tseitlin
- 28 January – Gilles Mirallès
- 14 February – Borislav Ivkov
- 7 May — Yuri Averbakh
- 13 July — Igor Naumkin
- 14 July — Nikolai Krogius
- 2 September — Mišo Cebalo
- 12 October — Konstantin Landa
- 4 December — Alex Sherzer
- 12 December — Iván Faragó

== See also ==
- Carlsen–Niemann controversy
