= 2016 in chess =

Major chess events that took place in 2016 included the Women's World Chess Championship 2016 between Mariya Muzychuk and Hou Yifan, won by Hou Yifan, and the Candidates Tournament, won by Sergey Karjakin, who challenged Magnus Carlsen in the World Chess Championship 2016. Magnus Carlsen won the match on tiebreaks and retained the title of World Chess Champion.

== 2016 tournaments ==
This is a list of significant 2016 chess tournaments:

| Tournament | Dates | Players | Winner | Runner-up | Third |
|---|---|---|---|---|---|
| 2016 Tata Steel Chess Tournament | 16–31 Jan | 14 | (Norway) Magnus Carlsen | (United States) Fabiano Caruana | (China) Ding Liren |
| 2016 Gibraltar Chess Festival | 26 Jan – 4 Feb | 150 | (United States) Hikaru Nakamura | (France) Maxime Vachier-Lagrave | (France) Étienne Bacrot |
| 2016 Zurich Chess Challenge | 12–15 Feb | 6 | (United States) Hikaru Nakamura | (India) Viswanathan Anand | (Russia) Vladimir Kramnik |
| Women's World Chess Championship 2016 | 1–14 Mar | 2 | (China) Hou Yifan | (Ukraine) Mariya Muzychuk | – |
| Candidates Tournament 2016 | 11–30 Mar | 8 | (Russia) Sergey Karjakin | (United States) Fabiano Caruana | (India) Viswanathan Anand |
| U.S. Chess Championship 2016 | 13–30 Apr | 12 | (United States) Fabiano Caruana | (United States) Wesley So | (United States) Hikaru Nakamura |
| Altibox Norway Chess 2016 | 18–30 Apr | 10 | (Norway) Magnus Carlsen | (Armenia) Levon Aronian | (France) Maxime Vachier-Lagrave |
| Shamkir Chess 2016 | 26 May – 4 Jun | 10 | (Azerbaijan) Shakhriyar Mamedyarov | (United States) Fabiano Caruana | (Netherlands) Anish Giri |
| Paris Grand Chess Tour | 9–12 Jun | 10 | (United States) Hikaru Nakamura | (Norway) Magnus Carlsen | (France) Maxime Vachier-Lagrave |
| Leuven Grand Chess Tour | 17–20 Jun | 10 | (Norway) Magnus Carlsen | (United States) Wesley So | (Armenia) Levon Aronian |
| 2016 Dortmund Sparkassen Chess Meeting | 9–17 Jul | 8 | (France) Maxime Vachier-Lagrave | (Russia) Vladimir Kramnik (United States) Fabiano Caruana (Cuba) Leinier Domínguez Pérez | – |
| Sinquefield Cup 2016 | 4–16 Aug | 10 | (United States) Wesley So | (Armenia) Levon Aronian | (Bulgaria) Veselin Topalov |
| World Chess Championship 2016 | 11–30 Nov | 2 | (Norway) Magnus Carlsen | (Russia) Sergey Karjakin | – |
| London Chess Classic 2016 | 9–18 Dec | 10 | (United States) Wesley So | (United States) Fabiano Caruana | (United States) Hikaru Nakamura |
| 2017 World Rapid Chess Championship | 26–28 Dec | 106 | (Ukraine) Vassily Ivanchuk | (Russia) Alexander Grischuk | (Norway) Magnus Carlsen |
| 2017 World Blitz Chess Championship | 29–30 Dec | 108 | (Russia) Sergey Karjakin | (Norway) Magnus Carlsen | (Russia) Daniil Dubov |
