= 1971 in chess =

Events in chess in 1971;

== Top players ==
FIDE top 10 by Elo rating - January 1971

1. Bobby Fischer United States 2740
2. Boris Spassky Soviet Union 2690
3. Viktor Korchnoi Soviet Union 2660
4. Bent Larsen Denmark 2660
5. Tigran Petrosian Soviet Union 2640
6. Lajos Portisch Hungary 2630
7. Mikhail Botvinnik Soviet Union 2630
8. Efim Geller Soviet Union 2630
9. Lev Polugaevsky Soviet Union 2630
10. Mikhail Tal Soviet Union 2620

== Chess news in brief ==
- Bobby Fischer sweeps aside all opposition in the World Championship Candidates Matches. Beginning with a 6-0 quarter-final win against Mark Taimanov in Vancouver, the American is in rampant form. Unbelievably, the score is repeated against Bent Larsen in the Denver semi-final. Former World Champion Tigran Petrosian makes a fight of it in the final, held in Buenos Aires and appears to be containing Fischer for the first half of the match, but then loses four games in a row to suffer a demoralising 2½-6½ defeat. Other Candidates' match scores are; quarter-final Robert Hübner 3-4 Petrosian (Seville, match resigned by Hübner as a protest over playing conditions); quarter-final Larsen 5½-3½ Wolfgang Uhlmann (Las Palmas); quarter-final Viktor Korchnoi 5½-2½ Efim Geller (Moscow); semi-final Petrosian 5½-4½ Korchnoi (Moscow). Fischer therefore qualifies to play Boris Spassky in a match for the World Championship in 1972. Commencing with his final seven games at the 1970 Palma de Mallorca Interzonal and finishing with his first match game with Petrosian, Fischer's run of twenty consecutive wins is the longest in first class chess since Wilhelm Steinitz established the record of twenty-five, between 1873 and 1882.
- Anatoly Karpov and Leonid Stein are joint winners of the Moscow Alekhine Memorial Tournament, with 11/17, ahead of Vasily Smyslov (10½/17), Vladimir Tukmakov and Petrosian (both 10/17). Spassky and Mikhail Tal finish on 9½/17.
- Korchnoi wins at Wijk aan Zee with 10/15. In joint second place are Svetozar Gligorić, Petrosian, Borislav Ivkov and Fridrik Olafsson (all 9½/15).
- Paul Keres and Mikhail Tal share a win at Tallinn with 11½/15, ahead of David Bronstein on 11/15.
- Korchnoi and Karpov are joint winners at the Hastings International Chess Congress (1971/72 edition) with 11/15, ahead of Henrique Mecking and Robert Byrne (both 9½/15).
- The winner of the 39th Soviet Championship is Vladimir Savon with 15/21. In finishing ahead of such colossi as Smyslov, Tal, Karpov, Bronstein, Taimanov, Polugaevsky, Vaganian, Stein, Balashov and others, the little-known Ukrainian delivers a surprising result, described by commentators as the least plausible for decades. The contest coincides with the final stages of Fischer's match with Petrosian, and there is speculation that this unsettling distraction in the Soviet camp has affected their play.
- Vlastimil Hort wins at Havana's Capablanca Memorial Tournament, with 10½/15. Following close behind are Efim Geller and Georgi Tringov.
- Twenty-year-old Yugoslav Ljubomir Ljubojević continues to make an impression, sharing first place with Oscar Panno at Palma de Mallorca with 11/15. Following are Samuel Reshevsky and Lajos Portisch (both 10/15).
- Ulf Andersson shares victory with Vlastimil Hort on 8½/11 at Gothenburg, ahead of Spassky (8/11).
- Hort wins the Czech Open Championship in Luhacovice with 11½/15, ahead of László Szabó on 10½/15 and Vladimir Liberzon on 10/15.
- Evgeny Vasiukov is the winner at Varna with 11/15, ahead of Florin Gheorghiu (10½/15) and Jan Smejkal (10/15). Smejkal makes a final norm towards qualification for the Grandmaster title.
- Walter Browne and Larry Evans are co-winners of the U.S. Open in Ventura. Over four hundred players participate.
- Larry Evans is the winner of the Statham Masters. The first edition of a series of tournaments, it is officially named after chess benefactor Louis D. Statham (1908–1983), who is primarily an engineer and inventor of medical instruments. Later, the event becomes more commonly known as the Lone Pine International, in association with its Californian venue.
- Gligoric wins the West German Open Championship, held in Berlin.
- Raymond Keene, one of several young English players chasing the country's first grandmaster title, wins the British Chess Championship in Blackpool.
- The 1971/72 edition of the Niemeyer junior tournament, held every year since 1962/63 in Groningen, is formally adopted by FIDE as the 1st European Junior Chess Championship. The winner is the young Hungarian Gyula Sax, who follows in the footsteps of compatriots Andras Adorjan and Zoltán Ribli, the winners of the previous two Niemeyer tournaments.
- Computer scientists at The Institute of Control Science, Moscow, create the chess-playing program KAISSA and run it on a British computer.
- Ken Thompson, an American chess enthusiast and pioneer of computing, writes his first chess-playing program called "chess" for the earliest version of his Unix operating system.

== Births ==
- Michael Adams, English GM, world elite player, former World Championship finalist - November 17
- Vladimir Akopian, Armenian GM, former World Junior Champion and highly rated - December 7
- Victor Bologan, Moldovan GM, a winner of the strong Dortmund Sparkassen event - December 14
- Vasil Spasov, Bulgarian GM, former World Junior Champion with multiple national titles - February 17
- Alexander Delchev, Bulgarian GM, former European Junior Champion and national champion - July 15
- Christopher Lutz, German GM, renowned theoretician and former national champion - February 24
- Konstantin Lerner, Soviet-Ukrainian GM, former national champion of Ukraine - February 28
- Vitali Golod, Ukrainian-Israeli GM, former champion of Ukraine before his move to Israel - June 23
- Martin Mrva, Slovak GM, former national champion - December 12
- Vasik Rajlich, Czech-American IM, author of the powerful playing program Rybka - March 19

== Deaths ==
- Olaf Barda, Norwegian IM, six times the national champion and a correspondence grandmaster - May 2
- Alexander Zaitsev, Soviet GM, tied first for the 1968/69 USSR Championship, died at thirty-six - November 8
- Hans Müller, Austrian IM, divided career between chess, skiing, fencing etc. Also a chess writer - February 28
- Victor Kahn, Russian-born master, later settled in France and won the national championship - October 6
- José Araiza, Mexico's best player prior to the arrival of Carlos Torre - September 27
- Iosif Pogrebyssky, Ukrainian master, active as a tournament player in the 1920s and 1930s - May 20
- Luis Palau, Argentinian master, represented his country at three Olympiads in the 1920s - February 8
