= 2020 in chess =

The 2020 chess calendar was disrupted by the COVID-19 pandemic, but major events that took place included the Tata Steel Chess Tournament, won by Fabiano Caruana, and Norway Chess, won by Magnus Carlsen. The Candidates began in March, but, due to the pandemic, was postponed at the half-way stage with Ian Nepomniachtchi and Maxime Vachier-Lagrave leading.

== 2020 tournaments ==
This is a list of significant 2020 chess tournaments:

=== Supertournaments ===
Tournament	System	Dates	Players (2700+)	Winner	Runner-up	Third
Tata Steel Chess Tournament 2020	Round robin	10–26 Jan	14 (11)	(United States) Fabiano Caruana	(Norway) Magnus Carlsen	(United States) Wesley So
Tata Steel Challengers 2020	Round robin	10–26 Jan	14 (0)	(Spain) David Anton Guijarro	(Uzbekistan) Nodirbek Abdusattorov	(Ukraine) Pavel Eljanov
Prague Chess Festival 2020	Round robin	12–21 Feb	10 (6)	(Iran) Alireza Firouzja	(India) Vidit Santosh Gujrathi	(Poland) Jan-Krzysztof Duda
Biel Chess Festival 2020	Round-robin	18–29 Jul	8 (4)	(Poland) Radoslaw Wojtaszek	(India) Pentala Harikrishna	(England) Michael Adams
Norway Chess 2020	Round robin	5–16 Oct	6 (5)	(Norway) Magnus Carlsen	(Iran) Alireza Firouzja	(Armenia) Levon Aronian
Russian Championship Superfinal 2020	Round robin	6–14 Dec	11 (6)	(Russia) Ian Nepomniachtchi	(Russia) Sergey Karjakin	(Russia) Vladimir Fedoseev

=== Open events ===
Tournament	System	Dates	Winner	Runner-up	Third
Gibraltar Chess Festival 2020	Swiss	21–30 Jan	(Russia) David Paravyan	(China) Wang Hao	(Russia) Andrey Esipenko (Russia) Daniil Yuffa
Aeroflot Open 2020	Swiss	19–27 Feb	(Azerbaijan) Aydin Suleymanli	(Kazakhstan) Rinat Jumabayev	(Azerbaijan) Rauf Mamedov

== Deaths ==
- 28 February — Gennady Kuzmin
- 5 March — Stanislav Bogdanovich
- 20 April — Arsen Yegiazarian
- 22 August — Miron Sher
- 24 August — Wolfgang Uhlmann
- 4 September — Dmitry Svetushkin
- 1 November — Markus Stangl
- 17 December — Krzysztof Bulski
