= 2003 in chess =

Events in chess in 2003:

== Deaths ==
- February 4 – Jaroslav Šajtar (1921–2003), 81, Czech Grandmaster and FIDE vice chairman.
- May 10 – Milan Vukcevich (1937–2003), 66, Yugoslav/American International Master, Grandmaster of Chess Composition, and scientist.
- May 11 – Luděk Pachman (1924–2003), 78, Czech Grandmaster, chess writer, and political activist.
- May 16 – Bogdan Śliwa (1922–2003), 81, Polish Grandmaster.
- June 24 – Russ Chauvenet (1920–2003), 83, American International Master, chess writer, U.S. deaf champion.
- July 11 – Ken Whyld (1926–2003), 77, British chess writer and researcher.
- August 31 - Péter Székely (1955–2003), 48, Hungarian Grandmaster.
- October 31 – Antonio Medina (1919–2003), 84, International Master, many time Spanish Champion.
- December 20 – Denis Barry (1929–2003), 74, American chess organizer and President of the USCF.
- December 28 – Frank Parr (1918–2003), 85, English chess player.
