= 2009 in chess =

Below is a list of events in chess during the year 2009, as well as the men's and women's FIDE rankings of that year:

== Events ==
- January 1 – Veselin Topalov (Bulgaria) gains 5 rating points to remain at the head the FIDE top 100 players list at 2796. Viswanathan Anand (India) is second at 2791.

Elo	FIDE Top Ten Men	FIDE Top Ten Women	Elo
2796	Veselin Topalov (BGR)	Judit Polgár (HUN)	2693
2791	Viswanathan Anand (IND)	Humpy Koneru (IND)	2621
2779	Vassily Ivanchuk (UKR)	Hou Yifan (CHN)	2571
2776	Magnus Carlsen (NOR)	Antoaneta Stefanova (BUL)	2557
2771	Alexander Morozevich (RUS)	Pia Cramling (SWE)	2548
2761	Teimour Radjabov (AZE)	Anna Muzychuk (SLO)	2540
2760	Dmitry Jakovenko (RUS)	Marie Sebag (FRA)	2529
2759	Vladimir Kramnik (RUS)	Nana Dzagnidze (GEO)	2518
2751	Peter Leko (HUN)	Maia Chiburdanidze (GEO)	2516
2751	Sergei Movsesian (SVK)	Alexandra Kosteniuk (RUS)	2516

- December 8–15 – The inaugural London Chess Classic is played in London. Magnus Carlsen (Norway) wins ahead of Vladimir Kramnik (Russia) and David Howell (England).

== Titles awarded ==
=== Grandmaster ===
In 2009 FIDE awarded the title Grandmaster to the following players:

== Deaths ==
- 22 January : Héctor Rossetto
- 27 April : Miroslav Filip
