= 2005 in chess =

Events in chess in 2005:

== Deaths ==
- January 2 – Arnold Denker (b 1914), 90, American Grandmaster.
- January 3 – László Vadász (b 1948), 56, Hungarian Grandmaster.
- March 14 – Simon Webb (b 1949), 55, British International Master, International Correspondence Chess Grandmaster, and chess writer.
- April 9 – Dragoljub Minić (b 1937), 68, Yugoslavian/Croatian Grandmaster.
- April 22 – Leonid Shamkovich (b 1923), 81, Russian/American Grandmaster.
- June 1 – Vladimir Savon (b 1940), 64, Soviet/Ukrainian Grandmaster, USSR Champion 1971.
- November 3 – Hrvoje Bartolović (b 1932), 73, Croatian Grandmaster of Chess Composition and International Judge of Chess Compositions.
- November 12 – Dragutin Sahovic (b 1940), 65, Serbian Grandmaster.
- November 17 – Igor Vasilyevich Ivanov (b 1947), 58, Russian/Canadian Grandmaster.
- December 15 – Enrico Paoli (b 1908), 97, Italian Grandmaster, established the Reggio Emilia chess tournament.
- December – Béla Berger (b 1931), 74, Hungary/Australia.
