= 1981 in chess =

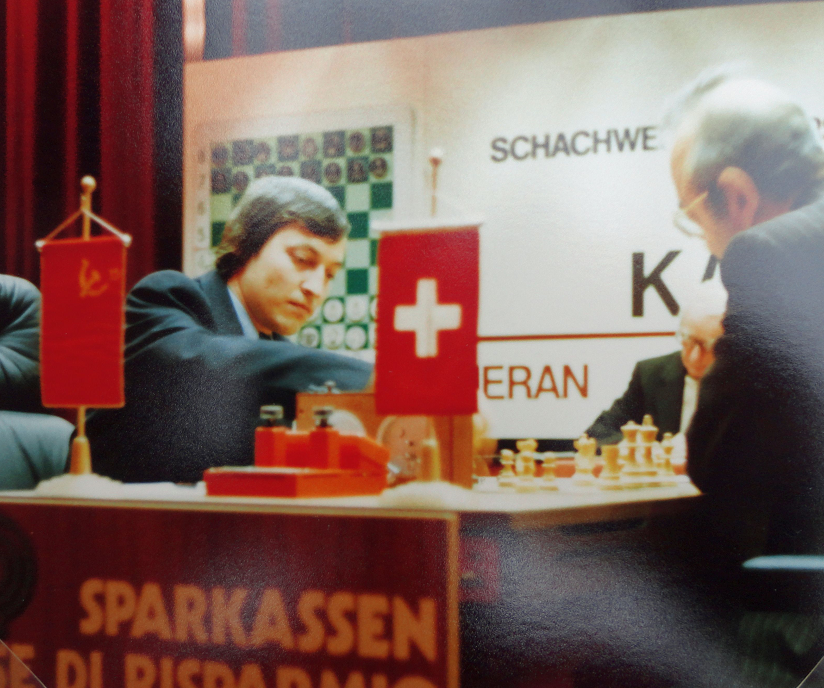
Anatoly Karpov and Viktor Korchnoi beginning the first game of the World Chess Championship 1981

The major chess events of 1981 were the final match of the Candidates Tournament (between Viktor Korchnoi and Robert Hübner) and the second Karpov–Korchnoi World Chess Championship match.

== Candidates Tournament Final ==
The final of the Candidates Tournament 1980–81 was held from December 1980 to January 1981 in the Palace Hotel in Merano, Italy. All earlier rounds of the tournament had been held in 1980. The winner of the tournament would be endorsed by FIDE to challenge the reigning champion, Anatoly Karpov (Soviet Union) to a match for the title of World Chess Champion. The finalists were Viktor Korchnoi (Switzerland) and Robert Hübner (West Germany), who had qualified for the final through an 8-player match knockout tournament. The other players of the tournament were András Adorján, Tigran Petrosian, Lev Polugaevsky (Soviet Union), Lajos Portisch (Hungary), Boris Spassky (France) and Mikhail Tal (Soviet Union). Tal, Petrosian and Spassky were former World Champions. The format of the final was a 16-game match. Hübner abandoned the match after completing games 1 to 8 and partially playing, adjourning and then abandoning unfinished games 9 and 10. This made Korchnoi the winner of the Candidates Tournament. Korchnoi had 4½ points to Hübner's 3½ and had won 3 games, lost 2 games and drawn 3 games.

Candidates Tournament Final 1980–81
	1	2	3	4	5	6	7	8	9	10	Total
Viktor Korchnoi (Switzerland)	0	1	½	0	½	½	1	1	*	*	4½
Robert Hübner (West Germany)	1	0	½	1	½	½	0	0	*	*	3½

== World Chess Championship match ==
The World Chess Championship 1981 was a match contested from 1 October to 19 November between the defending World Champion, Karpov and the challenger, Korchnoi. The first player to gain 6 wins would be awarded the title of World Chess Champion. Like the Candidates final, the match was held in Merano. Anatoly Karpov had been FIDE's recognized World Champion since 1975, when he gained the title by forfeit from Bobby Fischer (United States). Karpov and Korchnoi had both played only one World Chess Championship match prior to 1981, a very close match against one another in 1978 which was won by Karpov (+6 -5 =21).

Karpov, over 18 games, gained the required 6 wins to retain his title. Karpov won 6 games, lost 2 games and drew 10 games. Due to the decisiveness of the match, it was dubbed "the Massacre in Merano".

World Chess Championship Match 1981
	1	2	3	4	5	6	7	8	9	10	11	12	13	14	15	16	17	18	Wins	Total
Anatoly Karpov (Soviet Union)	1	1	=	1	=	0	=	=	1	=	=	=	0	1	=	=	=	1	6	11
Viktor Korchnoi (Switzerland)	0	0	=	0	=	1	=	=	0	=	=	=	1	0	=	=	=	0	2	7

== Notable international tournaments ==
The Hoogovens tournament was held as a 13-player single round robin tournament in its customary location of Wijk aan Zee, the Netherlands. Jan Timman (Netherlands) was the highest Elo-rated participant. The tournament was won jointly by Gennadi Sosonko (Netherlands) and Jan Timman, both with 8/12. Sosonko was also the only player to go unbeaten in every game. Evgeny Sveshnikov (Soviet Union) and Mark Taimanov (Soviet Union) came joint third, both with 7/12.

The Dortmund Sparkassen Chess Meeting was held in its customary location of Dortmund, Germany. It was won by Gennady Kuzmin (Soviet Union).

The 21st and final IBM international chess tournament was held in its customary location of Amsterdam, the Netherlands. It was won by Jan Timman for the second time.

The 3rd Linares International Chess Tournament was held in its customary location of Linares, Spain. It was won jointly by Anatoly Karpov and GM Larry Christiansen (United States).

== USSR Chess Championship (two editions) ==
The 48th and 49th USSR Chess Championship tournaments were, respectively, partially and completely held in 1981. The 48th USSR Chess Championship was held from 25 December 1980 to 21 January 1981 in Vilnius, Lithuania and was won jointly by Alexander Beliavsky and Lev Psakhis, each with 10½/17.

The 49th USSR Chess Championship was held from 27 November to 22 December 1981 in Frunze (now Bishkek), Kyrgyzstan and was won jointly by Psakhis and Garry Kasparov, each with 12½/17.

== Women's World Chess Championship ==
The Women's World Championship was a match held in Tbilisi, Georgia. Defending champion Maia Chiburdanidze (Soviet Union) was seeded into the final match and successfully defended the title, which she had held since 1978, against Nana Alexandria (Soviet Union).

== World Championships exclusive to young players ==
The World Junior Chess Championship, an Under-20 tournament, was held in Mexico City. It was won by Ognjen Cvitan (Yugoslavia).

The World Youth Chess Championship (Boys) Under-16 tournament was held in Embalse, Córdoba, Argentina. It was won by Stuart Conquest (England), who was 14 years old.

== Elo ratings / rankings ==
There were two Elo rating lists published by FIDE covering the 1981 player ratings; these lists were published in January and July. Anatoly Karpov was the highest-rated player in both lists, though his rating in the July list was only five points higher than Korchnoi's.

=== January Top 5 ===
1 : GM Anatoly Karpov (2690) (Soviet Union)

2=: GM Lajos Portisch (2650) (Hungary)

2=: GM Viktor Korchnoi (2650) (Switzerland)

4=: GM Robert Huebner (2635) (West Germany)

4=: GM Boris Spassky (2635) (France)

=== July Top 5 (6 players) ===
1 : GM Anatoly Karpov (2700) (Soviet Union)

2 : GM Viktor Korchnoi (2695) (Switzerland)

3 : GM Robert Huebner (2640) (West Germany)

4=: GM Jan Timman (2630) (Netherlands)

4=: GM Boris Spassky (2630) (France)

4=: GM Garry Kasparov (2630) (Soviet Union)
