= Sergei Tiviakov =

Dutch chess grandmaster (born 1973)

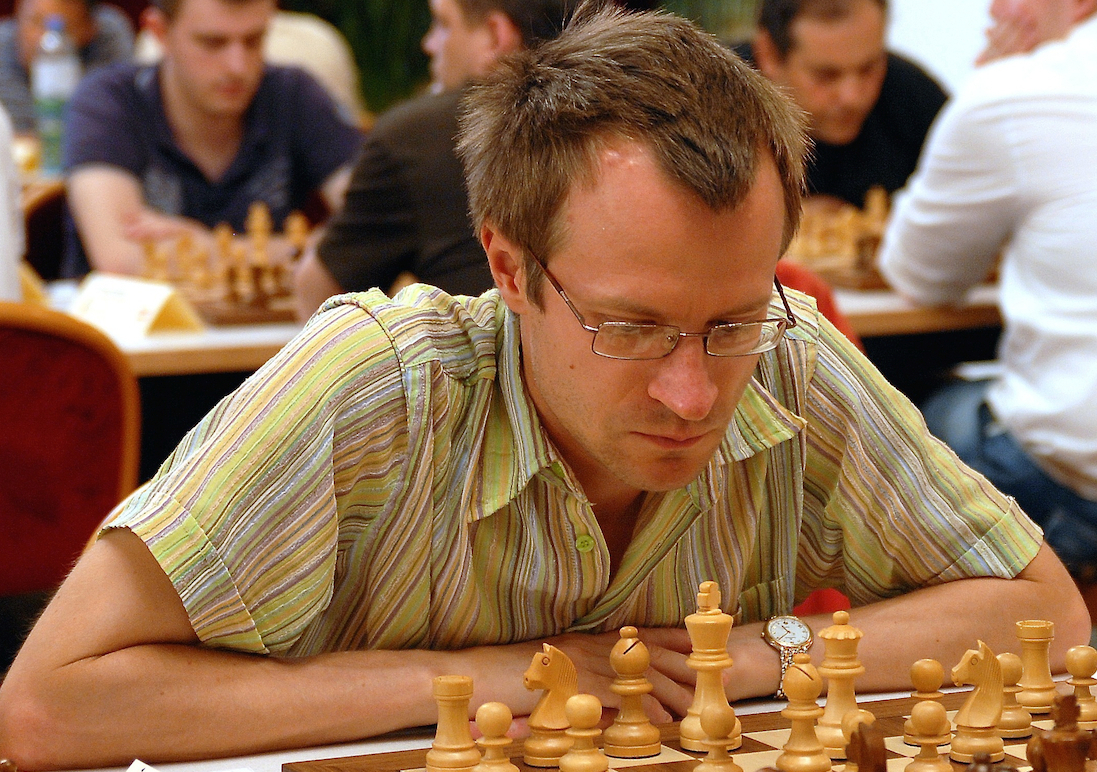
- Tiviakov at Vienna in 2009

Personal information
- Born: 14 February 1973 (age 53) Krasnodar, Russian SFSR, Soviet Union (now Russia)

Chess career
- Country: Soviet Union (until 1991); Russia (1991–1997); Netherlands (since 1997)
- Title: Grandmaster (1991)
- FIDE rating: 2545 (October 2026)
- Peak rating: 2699 (October 2005)
- Peak ranking: No. 14 (July 1995)

Sergei Nikolaevich Tiviakov (Russian: Сергей Николаевич Тивяков; born 14 February 1973) is a Russian–Dutch chess grandmaster. He is a four-time Dutch Champion and was European Champion in 2008.

== Chess career ==
Tiviakov won the World Under-18 Championship in 1990 in Singapore. He was awarded the Grandmaster title in 1991.

Tiviakov won the Dutch Chess Championship in 2006, 2007, 2018 and 2026. In 2008, in Plovdiv, Bulgaria he won the European Individual Chess Championship.

Tiviakov won the Politiken Cup in Helsingør, Denmark in July 2008 on tiebreak after scoring 8/10. In 2009 he won the 13th Unive Tournament in Hoogeveen. In 2011 he came first in the Fagernes Chess Festival, in the 5th Leiden Chess Tournament and in the First Panama Chess Open. In 2015 Tiviakov won the 24th Paul Keres Memorial Rapid Tournament in Tallinn.

His first Olympiad appearance was for Russia at the Moscow event in 1994, when he took home a gold medal in celebration of the team's winning performance. He played for the Dutch team at each of the events held from 2000 to 2006, with an overall record of +14 −2 =33 (62.2%).

At the European Team Chess Championships, he has earned three gold medals (two team and one individual) for his contribution to the successful Dutch teams of 2001 (León) and 2005 (Gothenburg). At León, he registered a 77.8% score.

Tiviakov and Bogdan Lalic both claim to have played a previous record 110 consecutive tournament games at classical time controls without losing, although neither player faced exclusively elite-level opponents during their unbeaten streaks and faced predominantly a mix of weaker professional and club level players while playing open tournaments. Tiviakov's streak occurred between 28 October 2004 and 27 September 2005. The current record belongs to Magnus Carlsen (+42, =83), who went unbeaten across 125 consecutive games between 31 July 2018 and 9 October 2020.. While still holding the record, Tiviakov said Ding Liren's 100 consecutive games without a loss against elite-level opponents in 2017–2018 was a comparison of apples and oranges.

Tiviakov won the 2026 Dutch Chess Championship in blitz tiebreaks.
