= Alexei Shirov =

Latvian-Spanish chess grandmaster (born 1972)

- Shirov at the 2026 Chess Olympiad

Personal information
- Born: 4 July 1972 (age 54) Riga, Latvia
- Spouses: Verónica Álvarez (m. 1994, divorced) Viktorija Čmilytė (m. 2001; div. 2007) Olga Dolgova (m. 2010)

Chess career
- Country: Soviet Union (until 1991); Latvia (1991–95, 2011–18); Spain (1995–2011, since 2018)
- Title: Grandmaster (1990)
- FIDE rating: 2597 (November 2026)
- Peak rating: 2755 (January 2008)
- Peak ranking: No. 2 (January 1994)

Alexei Dmitrievich Shirov (Russian: Алексе́й Дми́триевич Ши́ров, romanized: Alexey Dmitrievich Shirov, Latvian: Aleksejs Širovs; born 4 July 1972) is a Latvian and Spanish chess player. Shirov was ranked number two in the world in 1994.

He won a match against Vladimir Kramnik in 1998 to qualify to play as challenger for the classical world championship match with Garry Kasparov; it never took place due to a lack of sponsorship.

== Career ==
Shirov became the world under-16 champion in 1988 and was the runner-up at the World Junior Championship in 1990 (second on tiebreaks to Ilya Gurevich). In the same year, he achieved the title of Grandmaster. Shirov is the winner of numerous international tournaments: Biel 1991, Munich 1993, Madrid 1997 (shared first place with Veselin Topalov), Ter Apel 1997, Monte Carlo 1998, Mérida 2000, Paul Keres Memorial Rapid Tournament in Tallinn (2004, 2005, 2011, 2012, 2013), Canadian Open Chess Championship 2005.

He reached second on the FIDE rating list in January and July 1994, behind Anatoly Karpov, though Garry Kasparov was excluded from those lists and was rated higher. In 1998, Shirov's ranking rose again, to number four in the PCA rating list. On the basis of this rating, he was invited to play a ten-game match against Vladimir Kramnik to select a challenger for PCA World Champion Garry Kasparov. Shirov won the match with two wins, no losses and seven draws. However, the plans for the Kasparov match fell through when sufficient financial backing could not be found. When Kasparov instead played Kramnik for Kasparov's world title in 2000, Shirov maintained that the match was invalid and he was the rightful challenger.

In 2000, Shirov reached the final of the FIDE World Chess Championship, losing 3½–½ to Viswanathan Anand.

In 2002, he played in the Candidates Tournament to choose a challenger for Classical World Champion Kramnik. He won his group of four, but lost his semi-final 2½–½ to eventual winner Peter Leko.

In May–June 2007 he played in the Candidates Tournament of the World Chess Championship 2007. He won his first-round match against Michael Adams (+1−1=4, won in rapid playoff), but was eliminated when he lost his second-round match to Levon Aronian (+0−1=5). As of 2023, this is Shirov's last appearance at a Candidates Tournament.

In November–December 2007 Shirov played in the Chess World Cup 2007, which was a qualifier for the World Chess Championship 2010. He made the final, but lost the final 2½–1½ to Gata Kamsky.

In May 2009, Shirov won the category 21 M-Tel Masters 2009 tournament, held in Sofia, Bulgaria.

In September 2010, Shirov participated in the Grand Slam Chess Masters preliminary tournament in Shanghai, where he faced world No. 4 Levon Aronian, world No. 5 Vladimir Kramnik, and Wang Hao; the top two scorers qualified for the Grand Slam final supertournament from October 9 to 15 in Bilbao against world No. 1 Magnus Carlsen and World Champion Viswanathan Anand. After drawing his first two games, Shirov then won three consecutive games, including his first victory over Kramnik since 2003. Finishing with 4½/6 points, Shirov won the tournament, qualifying along with Kramnik for the Grand Slam final.

In May 2011, Shirov won a strong round-robin tournament in Lublin, Poland, the 3rd Lublin Union Memorial 2011 with a score of 5/7. In December 2011, he switched back federations from Spain to Latvia.

In February 2012, Shirov won the Aivars Gipslis Memorial in Riga with 8 points out of 9. In June 2012 Shirov won the Buenos Aires Masters Tournament (category 13) with 5½/7.

In August 2013, he played in the Chess World Cup. He won his first-round match against Hou Yifan, and was eliminated when he lost his second round match to Wei Yi. In August 2015, Shirov won the 5th Riga Technical University Open edging out Robert Hovhannisyan on tiebreak score, after both players finished on 7½/9. In March 2017, Shirov won the Mikhail Tal Memorial blitz tournament in Jūrmala scoring 9½/11 points.

In 2018 and 2019, he won the 5th and 6th Arica Open.

In September 2020, during the FIDE Online Chess Olympiad 2020, Shirov won the Gazprom Brilliancy Prize for his win as Black against Danyyil Dvirnyy in the Slav Defense, involving a queen sacrifice in a queenside attack, and achieved an overall score of 13/15 (+12−1=2) playing for the Spanish team.

In February 2021, Shirov won the 3rd Salamanca Chess Festival with a score of 6/7.

Through February and March 2022, Shirov played in the FIDE Grand Prix 2022. In the first leg, he placed fourth in Pool D with a 1.5/6 result. In the second leg, he tied with Vladimir Fedoseev for third in Pool C with a result of 2.5/6, finishing last in the standings with one point.

In July 2023, Shirov played in the 2023 Canadian Open Chess Championship. Shirov placed first with a result of 8.5/10.

== Personal life ==
Shirov is of Russian descent. In 1994 he married an Argentine, Verónica Álvarez, moved to Tarragona, and became a citizen of Spain. From 2001 to 2007, he was married to Lithuanian Viktorija Čmilytė, also a chess grandmaster and one of the strongest female chess players in the world. Shortly before the Shanghai 2010 tournament, Shirov got married for a third time to WIM Olga Dolgova. At that time he still played for Spain, but he and his wife also had an apartment in Riga, Latvia.

== Playing style ==
Shirov is noted for his attacking style, a tendency which has led to comparisons with fellow Latvian and former world champion, Mikhail Tal, under whom he studied in his youth.

=== Illustrative game ===
Topalov vs. Shirov, Linares 1998

Position: g1 white king, g2 white pawn, h3 black bishop, c3 white bishop, h4 white pawn, a4 black pawn, d5 black pawn, g6 black pawn, f6 black pawn, e6 black king

Position after 47...Bh3!! This move is placed number one in John Emms' book The Most Amazing Chess Moves of All Time.

During the 1998 Linares chess tournament Shirov played Black against future FIDE world champion Veselin Topalov and won by sacrificing his only bishop in a bishop and pawn ending:

1.d4 Nf6 2.c4 g6 3.Nc3 d5 4.cxd5 Nxd5 5.e4 Nxc3 6.bxc3 Bg7 7.Bb5+ c6 8.Ba4 0-0 9.Ne2 Nd7 10.0-0 e5 11.f3 Qe7 12.Be3 Rd8 13.Qc2 Nb6 14.Bb3 Be6 15.Rad1 Nc4 16.Bc1 b5 17.f4 exd4 18.Nxd4 Bg4 19.Rde1 Qc5 20.Kh1 a5 21.h3 Bd7 22.a4 bxa4 23.Ba2 Be8 24.e5 Nb6 25.f5 Nd5 26.Bd2 Nb4 27.Qxa4 Nxa2 28.Qxa2 Bxe5 29.fxg6 hxg6 30.Bg5 Rd5 31.Re3 Qd6 32.Qe2 Bd7 33.c4 Bxd4 34.cxd5 Bxe3 35.Qxe3 Re8 36.Qc3 Qxd5 37.Bh6 Re5 38.Rf3 Qc5 39.Qa1 Bf5 40.Re3 f6 41.Rxe5 Qxe5 42.Qa2+ Qd5 43.Qxd5+ cxd5 44.Bd2 a4 45.Bc3 Kf7 46.h4 Ke6 47.Kg1 Bh3!! (diagram) 48.gxh3 Kf5 49.Kf2 Ke4 50.Bxf6 d4 51.Be7 Kd3 52.Bc5 Kc4 53.Be7 Kb3 0–1

Shirov's bishop sacrifice (47...Bh3!!) is considered one of the greatest chess moves of all time.

== Chess books ==
Shirov has written two books on his best games:

- Shirov, Alexei (1995). Fire on Board: Shirov's Best Games. Everyman Chess. ISBN 1-85744-150-8.
- Shirov, Alexei (2005). Fire on Board, Part 2: 1997–2004. Everyman Chess. ISBN 1-85744-382-9.
