= Bryon Nickoloff =

Canadian chess player (1956–2004)

Personal information
- Born: June 23, 1956 Toronto, Ontario
- Died: August 3, 2004 (aged 48) North Bay, Ontario

Chess career
- Country: Canada
- Title: International Master (1981)
- Peak rating: 2470 (January 1982)

Bryon Nickoloff (June 23, 1956 – August 3, 2004) was a Canadian chess master. A Canadian champion, he also represented Canada six times at Chess Olympiads.

== Early years ==
Nickoloff, born of Bulgarian heritage in Toronto to emigre parents, came to chess at age 15, which is relatively late among players who eventually reached international standard. Within three years, he was playing at national master strength. He won the Toronto City Championship in 1978, and repeated in 1997 (shared) and 1998.

== International team play ==
He was top board for Canada at the World U26 Olympiad in Mexico 1978, leading the team to a 6th-place finish. He made his first of six Olympiad appearances for Canada later that year. In 68 games, he scored (+21 =27 -20), for 50.7 per cent. His international teams' record is as follows:

- Mexico City 1978 U26 Olympiad, board 1, 5/11 (+3 =4 -4)
- Buenos Aires 1978 Olympiad, 1st reserve, 2.5/6 (+1 =3 -2)
- Dubai 1986 Olympiad, board 2, 6.5/12 (+4 =5 -3)
- Thessaloniki 1988 Olympiad, 2nd reserve, 6/10 (+4 =4 -2)
- Novi Sad 1990 Olympiad, board 3, 6/10 (+4 =4 -2)
- Moscow 1994 Olympiad, board 3, 3.5/9 (+2 =3 -4)
- Elista 1998 Olympiad, board 3, 5/10 (+3 =4 -3)

Nickoloff moved to Mexico in 1978, married a Mexican woman, and earned his International Master title in 1981, following a string of top finishes in Mexican events in the late 1970s and early 1980s. His peak FIDE rating was 2470 in 1982, within the world's top 100 players at that time. Following a divorce, he returned to live in Toronto in the early 1980s, and played board one for the University of Toronto, leading the team to a title in the 1982 Pan American Intercollegiate Team Chess Championship.

== Canadian Championship near-misses ==
Nickoloff, while certainly one of Canada's top players for about 30 years, from the mid-1970s until his death in 2004, only managed to win the Canadian Chess Championship once in his nine attempts, when he tied for first with François Léveillé and Ron Livshits in 1995. He did remarkably well in his first attempt in 1978 at Toronto (Zonal), which was only seven years after he learned how to play. He scored 9/15 to share 7-8th places, with Jean Hébert winning. He was fifth at Ottawa (Zonal) 1984 on 8.5/15, with Kevin Spraggett winning. At the Winnipeg (Zonal) 1986, he scored 7/16 to share 8-9th places, with Spraggett and Igor Ivanov winning.

At the Canadian championship in Windsor (Zonal) 1989, he tied for 2nd-3rd places with Leon Piasetski, scoring 10/15. Since champion Kevin Spraggett had already qualified for the 1990 Interzonal as a candidate from the previous world championship cycle, Canada had a bonus interzonal berth, for which Nickoloff and Piasetski competed in a four-game match at Toronto 1990. With a career edge over Piasetski, and after scoring 1.5/2 to start, Nickoloff needed only a draw in either of the final two games to advance, because of a superior tiebreak score from Windsor. However, he lost both games and the match.

Nickoloff was off-form at Kingston (Zonal) 1992, scoring just 3.5/11 for 10th place, as Alexandre Lesiège won. Another near-miss was his shared 3rd-5th place at Hamilton (Zonal) 1994, on 10/15, with Spraggett again the champion. At the controversial Canadian championship in Ottawa 1995, Nickoloff fell asleep at the board during a game when it was his move and his clock was running down. Nickoloff was eventually awakened by another competitor (Kiviaho), and this led to a string of arguments and appeals, which disrupted play in subsequent rounds. Nickoloff was 5th at Toronto (Zonal) 1996 on 9/15, with Spraggett winning his fifth Zonal in six attempts. At Brantford (Zonal) 1999, Nickoloff scored 5/9 for a shared 7-10th place, with Alexandre Lesiège winning.

Nickoloff won the Canadian Open Chess Championship in 1992 and 1995. He won the 1985 Motor City Open in Detroit with 5.5/6. Nickoloff won the Ontario Open Championship in 1993 (shared), 1994, and 2000. He won the Ontario Championship in 1992 (shared). He also won several dozen weekend Swiss tournaments in the Toronto area during the course of his career.

== Later years, legacy ==
A bon vivant much like Mikhail Tal, Nickoloff indulged himself in alcohol, tobacco, and many late nights. In the late 1990s, when he was just in his early 40s, he was diagnosed with incurable stomach cancer and was in serious condition, losing much weight and strength. He received hundreds of letters from chess friends around the world, gathered inspiration from their support, and managed to survive until 2004, playing high-level tournament chess right to the end, which demonstrated to everyone his passion for chess and his great fighting spirit. He tied for first place at the Toronto Pan American Open at the end of 1999, despite his weakened condition. His last tournament was the 2004 Canadian Open Chess Championship in Kapuskasing, where, although badly emaciated by the disease, he managed to score 6.5/10, playing several fine games. Two weeks later, he died in hospital at age 48.

Nickoloff often played the Arkhangelsk variation in the Ruy Lopez, in which he played many important theoretical games.

In 2007, International Master Lawrence Day, a close friend and colleague, published the book Nick's Best, from Chess'n Math Association publishers. The book is an annotated collection of his best games, along with many stories from his colorful life.
