= Deen Hergott =

Canadian chess player

Personal information
- Born: Kitchener, Ontario

Chess career
- Country: Canada
- Title: International Master (1990)
- FIDE rating: 2391 (August 2016)
- Peak rating: 2485 (January 1996)

Deen Hergott is a Canadian International Master in Chess. By profession, he is a mathematician, computer programmer, and chess journalist.

== Early years ==
Deen Hergott learned chess in his hometown of Kitchener, Ontario, and by his mid-teens was approaching the strength of a National Master. He was selected to play for Canada at the World U26 Team Championship, Graz 1981. Hergott won the Junior Canadian Chess Championship, 1981–82, and represented Canada in the 1982 World Junior Chess Championship at Copenhagen, scoring a respectable 6/13.

Hergott studied mathematics at the University of Waterloo, graduating with an honours bachelor's degree in 1986. He also successfully represented the university in team chess competition, for example at the Pan American Intercollegiate Team Chess Championship, held in Kitchener, 1984, where he played board one. The World Chess Federation (FIDE) awarded him the FIDE Master (FM) title in 1988, and the International Master title in 1991. Hergott played in the Toronto Closed in 1981, 1982 and 1987, but later moved to Ottawa, where he has resided there since.

== Canadian Olympian ==
Hergott was chosen for the Canadian Olympiad team for Thessaloniki 1984, the first of his seven national selections. He was on the second reserve board, and scored 1/3. For Dubai 1986, he was on board four, and scored 6/10. At Thessaloniki 1988, he was first reserve, and scored 5/9. For Novi Sad 1990, he was again first reserve, and scored an undefeated 7/9 to win the bronze medal on that board. For Manila 1992, he was on board three, and made 5.5/10. At Moscow 1994, he ascended to board two, and scored 6.5/11. Not selected in 1996, he returned on board four at Elista 1998, and scored 5.5/11. His total score over seven Olympiads is 36.5/63 (+26 =21 -16), for 57.9%, according to olimpbase.org.

Hergott made his first appearance in the Closed Canadian Chess Championship at Winnipeg 1986, also a Zonal year, where he scored 6.5/15 in a strong field. He tied for third the next year in the Closed at Baie-Comeau, with 5.5/9. He played in the British Championship, Swansea 1987, scoring 6/11 in a powerful field headed by Grandmaster Nigel Short; Canadian Masters, as Commonwealth citizens, are eligible to play in the British Championship. The next Canadian Zonal was Windsor 1989, where he made an even score with 7.5/15. He tied for fourth in the 1992 Zonal at Kingston, with 6.5/11. His best Zonal performance was Hamilton 1994, where he finished clear second, with 10.5/15, a point behind Grandmaster Kevin Spraggett. In the controversy-marred Closed at Ottawa 1995, Hergott tied for third place with 5/8. Hergott placed seventh in the 1996 Zonal at Toronto with 8/15.

== International successes ==
Hergott has achieved some significant successes in international events outside Canada. At the strong Linares 1993 round-robin in Mexico, he tied for third with 9.5/15. That same year in an International Open at Sitges, Spain, he tied for first with 7/9, along with Liuben Spassov and Luis Comes Fabrego. One of the best result of his career was a clear first place at the 1994 Marshall Enhance tournament in New York, with 7/10.

Hergott tied for first place in the 1995 Canadian Open Chess Championship in Toronto with 8/10. A few weeks later, he shared first at the North Bay International Open on 6/8, along with Bent Larsen and Alexandre Lesiege (En Passant magazine, October 1995, p. 13). The next year in 1996, at the Canadian Open in Calgary, he tied for third with 7.5/10. In a very strong field in the Canadian Open at Winnipeg 1997, Hergott made 7/10 to finish tied for 9th place. At home in Ottawa for the Canadian Open in 1998, Hergott made a fine 7.5/10 to tie for fifth place. Later in 1998 at the North Bay International Open, Hergott tied for sixth with 6/9.

At home in Canada, Hergott has won the Grand Prix series championship for the Eastern Ontario Chess Association nine times, and has been victorious in several dozen weekend tournaments in Eastern Canada, often with dominant scores, including several perfect scores. Included among the perfect scores were a 7/7 to win the RA Club Championship in 1997, and a 5/5 to win the Ottawa / Hull Championship in 1998. Hergott reached his peak Canadian rating of 2580 in 1995, and this is the third highest ever recorded, behind only Grandmasters Kevin Spraggett and Alexandre Le Siege. His International rating crested at 2485 around the same time.

== Health problems, semi-retirement ==
Hergott's health problems in the early 2000s prevented further progress towards the Grandmaster title, and he has been virtually retired from serious play for several years, since 2002. Hergott did return to captain the victorious Ottawa team to a win in the Four Cities' Chess'n Math Association 20th Anniversary event, held in Kingston, 2005, where Ottawa defeated all-Master teams from Toronto, Montreal, and Quebec City. He won the RA Spring Open in March 2007, and served as live games commentator at the 2007 Canadian Open Chess Championship at Ottawa.

== Writings, style ==
Hergott became the chess columnist for the well-respected Ottawa Citizen newspaper in 1994, and has held that post since. His weekly Saturday column features an annotated game from either Canadian or international play, along with some news and commentary. Hergott has been a writer for Canada's national chess magazine Chess Canada, with his topics including instruction by annotating amateur games, international tournament reports, and intensive master games analysis.

Hergott is also a ranked Master in bridge and a rated expert in Scrabble.

Hergott's chess style tends to be tactical in nature, sometimes exceptionally sharp. It encompasses a wide range of openings. He can play solidly, or tend on occasion towards the bizarre; this makes him difficult to prepare for. He sometimes favours unusual defences with the Black pieces; these have included the Modern Defence, Owen's Defence, and the English Defence. From the late 1980s, he had success against strong competition with a highly eccentric, virtually unbooked Modern Defence line, which has been also variously named the Dutch Benoni, the Dzindzhi-Indian (for Grandmaster Roman Dzindzichashvili), and the Beefeater; the line runs 1.d4 g6 2.c4 Bg7 3.Nc3 c5 4.d5 Bxc3+ 5.bxc3 f5!? With the White pieces, Hergott has mostly favoured the Closed openings. There is a selection of 550 of his games at chessbase.com.

== Notable chess games ==
- Deen Hergott vs Sergio Mariotti, Dubai Olympiad 1986, Queen's Gambit Declined (D52), 1-0 Young Hergott knocks off the experienced Italian Grandmaster.
- Deen Hergott vs Anthony Miles, Groningen Open 1988, Reti Opening (A04), 1-0 Two chess improvisors get together, and the young Canadian comes out on top.
- Deen Hergott vs Sergei Kudrin, Thessaloniki Olympiad 1988, Grunfeld Defence (D93), 1-0 Hergott emerges triumphant after a very tough endgame.
- Deen Hergott vs Lawrence Day, Canadian Zonal Championship, Kingston 1992, King's Indian Defence, Saemisch Variation (E80), 1-0 When these two original players clash, you know some weirdness will soon arise.
- Deen Hergott vs Mihai Suba, Sitges 1993, English Opening, Symmetrical Variation (A30), 1-0 A booked opening variation for a change, and Hergott trumps the creative Romanian.
- Todd Southam vs Deen Hergott, Toronto Remembrance Day Open 1994, Keres / Owen's Defence (A40), 0-1 Another highly unusual game.
- Deen Hergott vs Kevin Spraggett, Toronto International Open 1995, Queen's Indian Defence (E13), 1-0 Among Canadians, there is no bigger scalp than Spraggett.
- Lawrence Day vs Deen Hergott, North Bay International Open 1995, Modern Defence (B06), 0-1 Yet another strange game filled with sacrifices and some bizarre ideas.
- Deen Hergott vs Gerard Welling, Den Bosch 1999, Queen's Pawn Game (D02), 1-0 Welling never stints his imagination, but winning usually takes more than that.

== See also ==
- List of University of Waterloo people
