= Mark Bluvshtein =

Canadian chess grandmaster (born 1988)

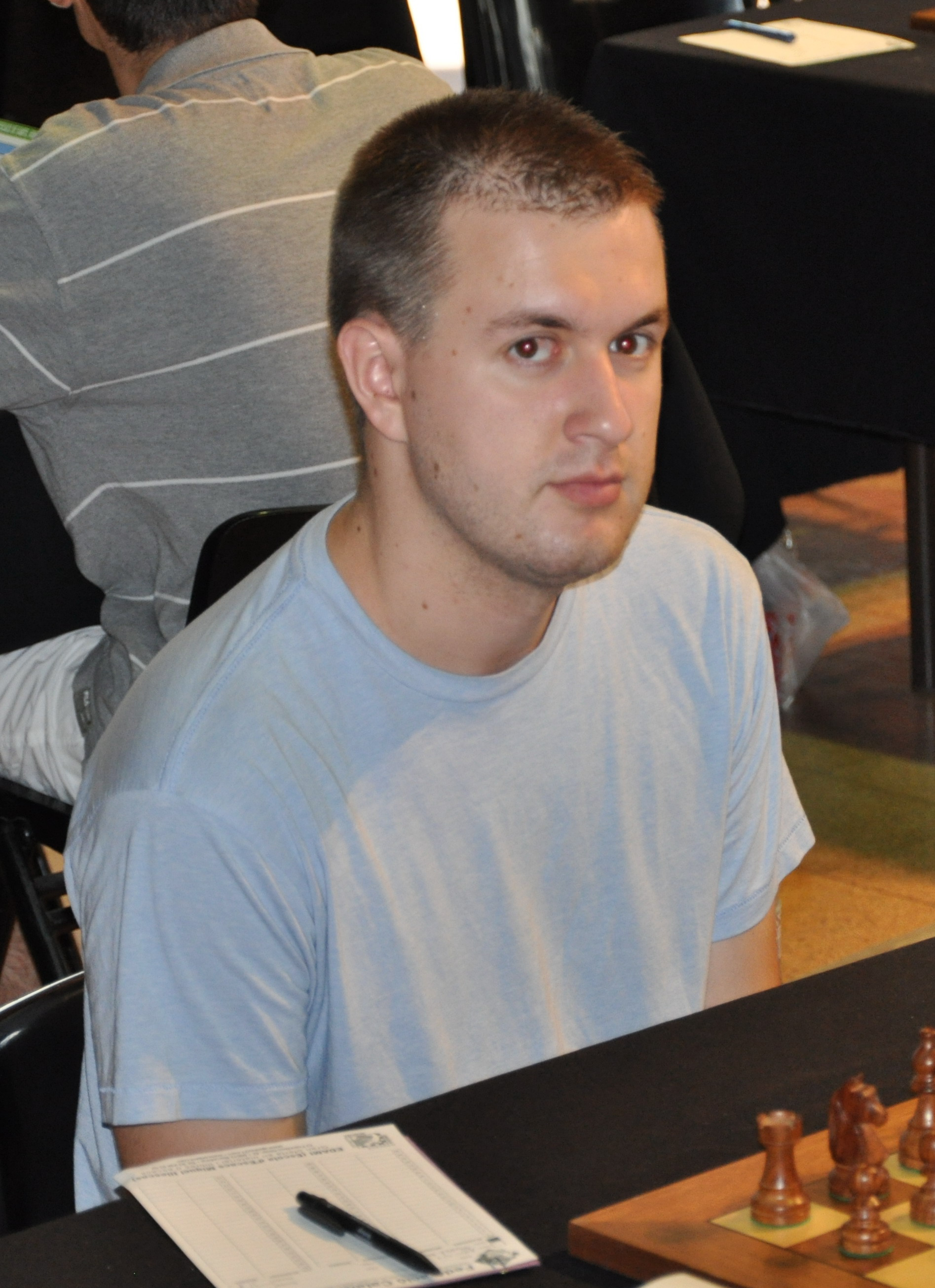
- Bluvshtein in Barcelona, 2010

Personal information
- Born: 20 April 1988 (age 38) Yaroslavl, RSFSR, Soviet Union

Chess career
- Country: Israel (until 1999); Canada (since 1999)
- Title: Grandmaster (2004)
- FIDE rating: 2590 (July 2026)
- Peak rating: 2611 (July 2011)

Mark Bluvshtein (born 20 April 1988) is a Soviet-born Canadian chess player. He became the youngest Canadian ever to achieve the title of Grandmaster in 2004, at the age of 16. He previously achieved the title International Master at the age of 13.

== Early life ==
Mark's father Ilia Bluvshtein is a Canadian National Master player himself, and taught his son how to play chess, playing countless games where Mark had material odds. The Bluvshtein family moved from Russia to Israel when Mark was five years old. They moved again, to Toronto, Ontario, Canada, six years later, where he attended Newtonbrook Secondary School. Bluvshtein graduated from Newtonbrook in 2006.

== Chess career ==
Bluvshtein was Israel under-10 champion (1998) and under-12 champion (1999).

Upon arriving in Canada, he earned a National Master ranking within a few months at age 11, making him the youngest Canadian to achieve this level. He was training during this time with Yan Teplitsky, who had studied in the famed Russian school run by Mark Dvoretsky before moving to Canada.

Bluvshtein's first major Canadian success came in 2000, when he tied for 2nd-3rd places in the Toronto Closed Championship, with a score of 8/11 points, behind Eduardo Teodoro IV. His first full international event in Canada was the Toronto Summer International Open 2000, where he made a score of 4½/9. He claimed clear first place in the Toronto Thanksgiving Open 2000 with 5/6, ahead of several strong masters. In the Junior Canadian Championship, Montreal 2001, he placed clear second with 7/9, behind winner Yaacov Vaingorten. In 2001, he won the Canadian grade 7 championship and in the Canadian Youth Championship, held at Sackville, New Brunswick, he took clear first place in the U14 group scoring 6½/7. Staying on for the Canadian Open Chess Championship, also at Sackville, Bluvshtein tied for 3rd-7th places, with 7½/10, behind only winners Tony Miles (in his last tournament before his death a few weeks later) and Larry Christiansen.

=== Youngest Canadian international master ===
A few weeks later, Bluvshtein became the youngest international master in Canadian history, at age 13, when he scored 6/9 at the Zonal Closed Canadian Championship in Montreal. He tied for 3rd-4th places, behind only winners Kevin Spraggett and Alexandre Lesiège. He won the 2001 Toronto Christmas Open with 4½/5.

In 2002, Bluvshtein won the Canadian grade 8 championship and made a perfect score of 8/8 in the Canadian Youth Championship (U14 group). Then, in the Canadian Open Championship, Montreal 2002, he tied for 4th-10th places, with 7½/10, behind only winners Jean-Marc Degraeve, Pascal Charbonneau, and Jean Hébert. Bluvshtein's first grandmaster round-robin tournament was the 2002 Montreal International, where he tied for 10th-11th places scoring 4/11; the winner was Degraeve. Just a couple of weeks later, in the 2nd Chess'n Math Association Futurity in Toronto, he tied for 1st-4th places, with 6/9, along with Yuri Shulman, Walter Arencibia, and Dimitri Tyomkin, missing a norm for the title of Grandmaster by half a point. In the Toronto Labour Day Open 2002, he tied for first at 5/6 with Goran Milicevic.

=== Youngest Canadian grandmaster ===
In June 2003, Bluvshtein scored his first norm for the title of Grandmaster at a round-robin tournament in Balatonlelle, Hungary, by winning his last three games and finishing with 6½/9. He scored solidly at the 2003 Guelph International, with 5/9, but he had a rough tournament at the Montreal International, as he could only score 3½/11 in a field which had nine grandmasters out of 12 competitors.

Bluvshtein switched trainers, working with Grandmaster Dimitri Tyomkin for a time, with success. With funding assistance from chess patron and businessman Sid Belzberg, Bluvshtein was able to work with Israeli Grandmaster Alexander Huzman, and this provided the impetus for his next qualitative advance.

Bluvshtein made a Grandmaster norm at the 2004 Canadian Open Championship in Kapuskasing, where he played eight grandmasters in ten rounds, while scoring 6½/10 to tie for 13th-26th places; he beat Vladimir Epishin and Arencibia, and lost only one game.

The next month, at the 2004 Montreal International, he made his third and final qualifying grandmaster result with 6½/11 to place fourth; the winner was Zahar Efimenko. Then he placed third, following a tie-break playoff, at the Zonal Canadian Championship in Toronto, with 6½/9, behind co-winners Charbonneau and Eric Lawson. A couple of months later, Bluvshtein raised his international rating above 2500, completing the requirements for the title of Grandmaster. He was awarded the title by FIDE at age 16, during the 36th Chess Olympiad, held in Calvià, where he made a further grandmaster norm. Chess'n Math awarded Bluvshtein $7,000 for becoming a grandmaster.

Bluvshtein won the Canadian Youth Championship (Under 18 group) in 2005, and tied for first at the Canadian Open Championship at Edmonton 2005, with a score of 8/10. He defeated Alexei Shirov among others.

In 2006, Bluvshtein tied for 2nd-5th places at the Zonal Canadian Championship in Toronto, with 6½/9, behind champion Igor Zugic. Bluvshtein shared the title at the First Saturday tournament in Budapest in June 2007, scoring 8/11. He scored 7/10, unbeaten, in the 2007 Canadian Open Championship in Ottawa. At Montreal 2007, he defeated former world championship finalist Nigel Short.

In June 2008 Bluvshtein won the Budapest First Saturday tournament scoring 10 points put of 13, a full point ahead of the second place. At 2008 Montreal International, he tied for second with Hikaru Nakamura and Varuzhan Akobian with 5½ of 9, behind the winner Yuri Shulman. In the 2009 Quebec Invitational, Bluvshtein took second place with 7 of 9, half a point behind the winner Anton Kovalyov. That same year he tied for first with 7½ of 9 in the Canadian Open at Edmonton, ahead of Alexei Shirov and Michael Adams. Right after this Bluvshtein took second place on Canadian Zonal with 6½ of 9, undefeated. Proceeding to the strong 2009 Montreal International, he scored 5½ points out of 11, beating Alexander Onischuk and Alexander Moiseenko.

In 2010 Bluvshtein graduated from university and engaged in chess for a full year professionally. He played in 13 tournaments and matches around the world over the year. Bluvshtein tied for second in Nuremberg with 5½ of 7. He then played on the first board for team Canada at the 2010 Chess Olympiad, beating former world champion and world number two Veselin Topalov. At 2010 Groningen Bluvshtein tied for first place with 6½/9. His next success came in the 2011 American Continental Championship, where he tied for first with 7½/9 to qualify for the 2011 FIDE World Cup. Right after this he played in the Premier group of the Capablanca Memorial tournament in Havana, Cuba and tied for first again, scoring 6 of 9. At the World Cup Bluvshtein was eliminated in the first round by Alexander Riazantsev.

Bluvshtein was selected as the Canadian Chess Player of the Year in 2004, 2005, 2008 and 2011.

=== Youngest Canadian Olympian ===
Bluvshtein was first selected to play for the Canadian Olympiad team at age 14 in 2002; this tied the record for the youngest Canadian male chess Olympian, first set by Daniel Yanofsky in 1939. Bluvshtein was also selected in 2004, 2006, 2008 and 2010, gradually moving up the boards and playing on board one in his last two Olympiads. His results in this Olympiad are:

- Bled 2002: 1st reserve: 8/11, +7 =2 -2; 2553 performance
- Calvià 2004: 3rd board: 8.5/12, +7 =3 -2; 2638 performance
- Turin 2006: 2nd board: 7.5/11, +5 =5 -1; 2576 performance
- Dresden 2008: 1st board: 5/9, +4 =2 -3; 2429 performance
- Khanty-Mansiysk 2010: 1st board: 6/11, +4 =4 -3; 2576 performance

His totals for Canada in Olympiad play are: 54 games, +27 =16 -11, for a score of 64.8%.

== Personal life ==
In September 2011 Bluvshtein retired from chess and is pursuing other career opportunities. Bluvshtein graduated from York University in Toronto in 2010, majoring in Science and Technology Studies. He received an MBA from the Rotman School of Management at the University of Toronto in 2016. As of August 2017, Mark was working at Wave in Toronto as a Manager, Financial Services. At the same company, Bluvshtein later became Director, Business Operations.

== Notable chess games ==
- Dmitri Tyomkin vs Mark Bluvshtein, Oakham 2001, Bogo-Indian Defence (E11), 0-1 Young Mark downs a Grandmaster at just age 13.
- Mark Bluvshtein vs Irina Krush, New York Generation Chess International 2003, Sicilian Defence, Richter-Rauzer Variation (B66), 1-0 Bluvshtein defeats one of the world's best young woman players.
- Mark Bluvshtein vs Dmitri Tyomkin, Canadian Zonal Championship, Toronto 2004, Sicilian Defence, Kan / Taimanov Variation (B42), 1-0 Crafty maneuvering eventually explodes into tactical fireworks.
- Mark Bluvshtein vs Ognjen Cvitan, Calvia Olympiad 2004, King's Indian Defence, Classical Variation (E91), 1-0 Impressive positional performance against a strong GM.
- Mark Bluvshtein vs Viacheslav Dydyshko, Calvia Olympiad 2004, Nimzo-Indian Defence (E20), 1-0 Bluvshtein has played some important original games in this variation.
- Mark Bluvshtein vs Normunds Meizis, Calvia Olympiad 2004, Budapest Defence, Rubinstein Variation (A52), 1-0 Bluvshtein defeats Black's sharp offbeat opening in precise positional style.
- Mark Bluvshtein vs Ildar Khairullin, World Youth Championship, Boys' Under 18 Group, Belfort 2005, Benko Gambit, Fianchetto Variation (A58), 1-0 Another sharp opening is dealt with in fine fashion.
- Alexei Shirov vs Mark Bluvshtein, Canadian Open, Edmonton 2005, Petroff Defence (C42), 0-1 Bluvshtein's biggest scalp to date, as Shirov is humbled when Black sacrifices two pieces.
- Nigel Short vs Mark Bluvshtein, Montreal International 2007, King's Gambit Accepted (C34), 0-1 Former World Finalist Short sacrifices his Queen for strong attacking chances, but Bluvshtein defends perfectly and scores with his counterattack.
- Mark Bluvshtein vs Veselin Topalov, Khanty-Mansiysk Olympiad 2010, King’s Indian Defence (E90), 1-0 Bluvshtein's biggest scalp as he beats former World Champion and current FIDE rating #2.
