= Richard Wang (chess player) =

Canadian chess player (born 1998)

Personal information
- Born: Richard C. Wang; 17 September 1998 (age 27) Sudbury, Canada

Chess career
- Title: International Master (2012)
- FIDE rating: 2336 (February 2020)
- Peak rating: 2430 (September 2013)

Richard Wang (born 1998) is a chess international master from Canada. Wang became the second youngest International Master in Canadian history at the age of 13 at the 2012 Canadian Closed Chess Championships (Zonal) held in Montreal, Canada. Other notable achievements include winning two bronze medals at the World Youth Chess Championship: the first in 2009 in the U12 Boys section and the second in 2012 in the U14 Boys section. He is one of the few Canadians to win more than one medal at the WYCC.

== Chess career ==
=== Early achievements ===
Richard Wang started his chess career by playing in tournaments held by the Chess'n Math Association in Alberta. His first chess achievement was at the age of 6 when he got second place at the Edmonton Chess Challenge (Gr.2) in March 2005. Other successes soon followed; he placed second in the 2005 Alberta Chess Challenge (Gr.2) and won both the Edmonton Chess Challenge and the Alberta Chess Challenge (Gr.3) in 2006.

=== Youth Chess Championships ===
Richard Wang has won the Alberta Youth Chess Championships 9 times (2007, 2008, 2009, 2010, 2011, 2012, 2013, 2014, and 2015 in the U10, U10, U12, U12, U14, U14, U16, U16, and U18 categories, respectively) and has represented Alberta at the Canadian Youth Chess Championships every time. He placed third in 2007 2013, and 2016; second in 2008 and 2010; and first in 2009, 2011, 2012, 2014, and 2015.

Wang has represented Canada at the World Youth Chess Championships 5 times (2007 and 2009 in Antalya, Turkey; 2011 in Caldas Novas, Brazil; 2012 in Maribor, Slovenia; and 2013 in Al-Ain, UAE). His most notable achievements at the WYCC was in 2009 and 2012, where he won bronze medals. In 2009, he tied for second (third on tie-break) in his junior year in the U-12 Boys section with 8.5/11, despite only being seeded 27th. His success marked the first time since 1986 that Canada won a medal at the World Youth Chess Championships. In 2012, he placed third in his senior year in the U-14 Open section with 8.5/11, slightly higher than his original 4th seed.

=== Junior Chess Championships ===
Wang has won the Alberta Junior Chess Championships in 2008, 2012, and 2013; placed second in 2010; and placed third in 2011. He has represented Alberta three times at the Canadian Junior Chess Championships. He tied for fourth place with 4/7 in 2009 and got second in 2012 with a score of 6/7. His best Canadian Junior Chess Champion result was in 2013, where he placed first.

=== Notable provincial successes ===
Richard Wang has had multiple tournament successes in Alberta. He placed first in both the 2012 and 2015 editions of the Alberta Closed Chess Championships. Winning the 2012 edition made him both the youngest Alberta Champion and Fide Master in Alberta history. Wang is currently the third highest CFC and FIDE rated player in Alberta, behind IM Edward Porper and GM Eric Hansen.

=== International Master title ===
Wang earned his International Master title at the 2012 Canadian Closed Chess Championships (Zonal) held in Montreal (won by GM Bator Sambeuv; see list of previous winners). Despite a loss in the first round to a lower-rated opponent, Wang managed to get 6/9 (a result good enough to tie for third) by getting draws against GM Anton Kovalyov, IM Jean Hébert, and IM Raja Panjwani. After defeating Candidate Master Nikita Gusev in a playoff game, Wang was awarded the IM title.

At the age of 13, Wang became the second youngest player in Canadian history to become an International Master. He was only a few months older than International Grandmaster Mark Bluvshtein, the youngest Canadian player to become an IM, when he became an international master.

== Notable chess games ==
- Richard Wang vs Walter Arencibia, 2013 Canadian Open Chess Championships, Ottawa 2013, Sicilian: Chekhover Variation (B53) 0-1
- Richard Wang vs Reynaldo Vera, 2013 Quebec Invitational, Montreal 2013, Colle (D05) 1-0
- Richard Wang vs Samuel Shankland, Edmonton International, Edmonton 2014, Indian Game: Yusupov-Rubinstein System (A46) 1-0
- Richard Wang vs Conrad Holt, 42nd World Open, Arlington 2014, Nimzo-Indian: Rubinstein System (E54) 1-0
