= Laszlo Witt =

Personal information
- Born: April 2, 1933 Budapest, Hungary
- Died: December 27, 2005 (aged 72) Toronto, Ontario, Canada

Chess career
- Country: Canada
- Title: International Master (1969)
- Peak rating: 2340 (July 1971)

Laszlo Witt (born April, 1933 in Budapest, Hungary, died December 27, 2005, in Toronto, Ontario, Canada) was a Hungarian-Canadian International Master of chess.

== Biography ==
=== Early life ===
Laszlo (Leslie) Witt was born in Hungary and lived there until 1956. He began playing chess at age eight, and by 17 was the top junior player in Hungary.

Witt was part of an exceptionally talented cohort of young Hungarian chess players. Contemporaries in his age group included future Grandmasters Levente Lengyel, Gyozo Forintos, and Istvan Bilek, future International Master and noted writer Egon Varnusz, and future world-class Grandmaster Lajos Portisch, who was a bit younger. Grandmaster Laszlo Szabo (chess player) of Budapest was among the world's top ten players for some 20 years during this era.

=== Defects, emigrates to Canada ===
Witt emigrated to Canada following the failed Hungarian Revolution of 1956, which was crushed by the Soviet Union. He was competing in a chess tournament in Vienna, Austria at that time. Witt's wife Viola and young daughter Sylvia fled Hungary, and joined him in an Austrian refugee camp; by early 1957 the Witts, a Jewish family, had reached Halifax, Nova Scotia, where Viola had a relative. The Witts made their new home in Montreal, Quebec. Witt made his career in the electronics industry.

Witt was one of four very strong Hungarian chess players who emigrated to Canada around this time, along with Geza Fuster, Dr. Elod Macskasy, and Andrew Kalotay; all four earned Master titles in Canada, and represented Canada in international team competition.

=== Canadian chess successes ===
==== Canadian Open and Ontario Open ====
Witt competed four times in the Canadian Open Chess Championship. He won at Ottawa 1962 with a perfect 9-0 score, the only time this has been done in the tournament's 60-year history. At Scarborough, Toronto 1964, he placed tied 3rd-5th with 7.5/10. At Kingston, Ontario 1966, he tied 7-14th with 7/10. At Montreal 1974, he tied 5-15th with 8.5/11. His overall score in Canadian Opens was 32/40, for 80 per cent. Witt won the Ontario Open in 1965.

==== Montreal Open and Quebec Championship ====
Witt won the Montreal Open championship on six occasions: 1959, 1961, 1962, 1965, 1966, and 1979 (tied with future Grandmaster Kevin Spraggett; Spraggett won the playoff match). He won the Quebec provincial championship on five occasions: 1962, 1963, 1964, 1965, and 1967.

==== Quebec Carnival Open ====
Witt won the Quebec Carnival Open in 1966 and 1967; this is a major event on the provincial circuit.

==== Chess Olympiad ====
Witt represented his new country Canada at the Chess Olympiad on three occasions: 1964 at Tel Aviv (4/10) on the second reserve board; 1966 at Havana (10.5/18 on board 3); and 1970 at Siegen, Germany (4/11 on board 4).

==== Canadian Chess Championship ====
Witt competed three times in the Canadian Chess Championship. He placed 7th at Winnipeg 1963 (Zonal), with 8.5/15. He earned the title of International Master with his performance in the 1969 Canadian Chess Championship (Zonal), held in Pointe Claire, Quebec, where he tied for 4-5th with 11.5/17. At Toronto 1972 (Zonal), he placed 6th with 9.5/17. His overall score in the Canadian Championship was 29.5/49, for just over 60 per cent.

=== Later years ===
Witt moved to Toronto in the early 1980s, and lived there the rest of his life. He gradually withdrew from serious chess competition, with his last strong event in 1987. He died in Toronto on December 27, 2005, of pneumonia, at age 72.
