= Duncan Suttles =

Canadian chess grandmaster (born 1945)

Personal information
- Born: 21 December 1945 (age 80) San Francisco, California

Chess career
- Country: Canada
- Title: FIDE Grandmaster (1973); ICCF Grandmaster (1982)
- FIDE rating: 2420 (January 1985)
- Peak rating: 2485 (July 1973)
- Peak ranking: No. 94 (July 1973)
- ICCF rating: 2632 (January 1992)

Duncan Suttles (born 21 December 1945) is a Canadian chess grandmaster. Canada's second grandmaster after Abe Yanofsky, Suttles was recognized internationally for the originality of his strategic play in the mid-1960s and 70s. He retired from competitive chess in 1985.

== Early years ==
Born in San Francisco, Suttles moved to Canada at age 8 when his father began teaching at the University of British Columbia. Mentored by Elod Macskasy, he was of national master strength by his mid-teens, which was unusual for Canadian chess at that time.

Suttles was 15 when made his first appearance in the Closed Canadian Chess Championship at Brockville, 1961, scoring 3/11. Suttles won the British Columbia Championship in 1963 and 1966. In his second Closed, he scored 8½ from 15 games at Winnipeg 1963, finishing just above the middle of the strongest and youngest field yet seen in a Canadian final. Suttles tied for 3rd–5th places in the 1964 Canadian Open Chess Championship in Toronto, and as the top junior, qualified for the 1965 World Junior Chess Championship. He took part in the Gijon International Chess Tournament (1965), placing 2nd behind Luis Bronstein. At home in Vancouver for the 1965 Canadian Championship, Suttles scored 8/11, finishing second behind eight-time champion Abe Yanofsky. As a dual citizen (he became a Canadian citizen in 1966), Suttles was also eligible for the US Championship in New York City in 1965–66, where he finished last with 2½/11; Bobby Fischer won.

Suttles attended the University of British Columbia and represented the school in inter-university chess competition. He earned his undergraduate degree in mathematics and began to study for a doctorate, but eventually quit the program to work in private industry. He married his wife Dobrila in 1968.

== Represents Canada ==
Suttles represented Canada at the Junior World Chess Championship, Barcelona, 1965. He scored 1½/4 playing in a strong preliminary group which included the eventual winner, Bojan Kurajica. He did win the B final, however, ahead of Raymond Keene. He represented Canada in the qualifying Interzonal event for the World Chess Championship at Sousse, 1967, scoring 9½/21 for 15th place. Suttles won the Canadian Chess Championship held at Pointe-Claire 1969, after a playoff match against Zvonko Vranesic in Toronto, which Suttles won 2½–1½. This qualified him for the Interzonal at Palma de Mallorca, 1970, where he tied for 15th-16th place with a 10/23 score.

== Olympiad stalwart ==
At 18, Suttles was chosen for the Canadian Olympiad team in Tel Aviv, 1964, the first of his eight appearances, including six in a row over a period of 20 years. He frequently played a large number of games in these team events, near the maximum. His totals for Canada in the Olympiads were +49 −30 =43, for 57.8 percent. He also played Board 1 on the Canadian team at the 1971 Student Olympiad that won the bronze medal.

- Tel Aviv 1964: 1st reserve, 5½/10, +4 −2 =3;
- Havana 1966: 4th board, 10/18, +8 −5 =5;
- Lugano 1968: 2nd board, 11½/17, +7 =9 −1;
- Siegen 1970: 2nd board, 8/16, +3 −3 =10;
- Mayagüez Student Olympiad 1971: 1st board, 6½/11, +6 −4 =1, team bronze;
- Skopje 1972: 1st board, 9½/17, +6 −4 =7;
- Nice 1974: 1st board, 10½/19, +8 −6 =5;
- Valletta 1980: 2nd board, 3/8, +2 −4 =2;
- Thessaloniki 1984: 1st board, 5/11, +4 −5 =2.

== Grandmaster ==
Suttles was already of grandmaster strength by 1968, and in fact qualified for the grandmaster title at the Lugano Olympiad. However, he was denied the title on the basis of a technicality, namely that he had played (and won) one more than the required number of games in the event. Instead, Suttles settled for the International Master title earned at the Sousse Interzonal in 1967. He finally achieved the grandmaster title at the San Antonio tournament of 1972, gaining the last half-point needed by drawing his game against the former world champion, Tigran Petrosian.

He won the Canadian Open Chess Championship at Ottawa 1973. He also won the 1973 La Presse Open in Montreal. Suttles tied for first place in the U.S. Open Chess Championship at Chicago 1973, scoring 10/12 and defeating GM Walter Browne in the last round. Suttles placed clear second in the 1974 Canadian Open Chess Championship in Montreal with 9½/11, losing only to the winner, Ljubomir Ljubojević. That same year, Suttles finished third in a strong field at an international tournament in Venice.

He won the International Open at the Vancouver International Chess Congress in 1981, defeating Tony Miles and Yasser Seirawan in the final two rounds. The 1984 Vancouver Futurity marked Suttles's final Canadian event.

While taking a break from over-the-board chess, Suttles won a major international correspondence chess tournament, the Heilimo Memorial, played from 1978–1981. Awarded the title of International Grandmaster of Correspondence Chess in 1982, he is one of the few players in chess history to hold both over-the-board and correspondence GM titles.

== Playing style and legacy ==
In his youth, Suttles was strongly influenced by Aron Nimzowitsch, and became, like Nimzowitsch, well-known for his unorthodox treatment of hypermodern openings.

Suttles championed the Modern Defence from the mid-1960s, showing that the line, which had previously been regarded with skepticism, was a fully playable universal defence against any White opening move. The line was dubbed The Rat, after the Black fianchettoed bishop which kept dodging around in its holes.

As White, Suttles favoured 1.e4, with a predilection for the Closed Variation against the Sicilian Defence, and the baroque Vienna Game after 1.e4 e5. He occasionally played the English Opening (1.c4) as well. By the early 1970s, he was frequently opening with 1.g3 as White, aiming for a reversed Modern Defence, another new opening idea. His unique skills – such as the avoidance of main opening lines, use of a defensive kingside fianchetto, development of knights to unusual squares, and sudden eruption of tactics – are illustrated in the games listed below.

Suttles was the leader in the group of young masters mentored by Macskasy. The players fought each other over-the-board, but they also collaborated and learned from each other, and employed original playing styles to largely dominate Canadian chess for the better part of a decade. Other group members from the late 1960s were Peter Biyiasas, Bruce Harper, Jonathan Berry, and Robert Zuk.

Suttles' originality gained the attention of the chess world, but it also sparked some degree of incomprehension. Robert Byrne, chess columnist for the New York Times, wrote:

The taciturn Suttles is notorious for the most eccentric style in current chess – what might be called "outlandish hypermodernism." Not only does he develop his bishops on the wings, he also frequently sends his knights to the edges of the board too. If one can speak of antecedents for Suttles, it would have to be the crotchety British master Henry E. Bird or the defiant Wilhelm Steinitz at his most bizarre.

However, Pal Benko commented that:

It is getting more and more difficult to find new ideas in theory, and for this reason one must admire those masters who are able to direct the game according to their original imagination and avoid the commonplace. One of these masters is Suttles, who has been called the Canadian Nimzovich. His wife Dobrila tells me that Duncan has no chess books at home, but this does not mean that he is unprepared for his opponents. He takes the time before each game to go over his systems.

Raymond Keene and George Botterill discussed Suttles' games and the strategy of the Rat in their book-length study, The Modern Defence (1972).

The World of Chess (1974), by Anthony Saidy and Norman Lessing, said that Suttles was the "most original strategist since Nimzowitsch."

"Suttles' style is unusual and he specializes in irregular openings," according to The Batsford Encyclopedia of Chess. "His positions look awkward but his play is sound and he is remarkably good at finding ingenious defences in what seem to be hopeless positions."

The largest annotated collection of Suttles' games (more than 600 in all) is Chess on the Edge. Published in three volumes in 2008, the effort was led by Bruce Harper with assistance from Yasser Seirawan, Gerard Welling, and Jonathan Berry.

== Notable chess games ==
- Gyozo Forintos vs Duncan Suttles, Tel Aviv Olympiad 1964, Modern Defence / Queen's Pawn Game (A40), 0–1 White responds in quiet and unusual fashion, but the game soon intensifies to Black's advantage.
- Milan Matulovic vs Duncan Suttles, Sousse Interzonal 1967, Modern Defence, Averbakh Variation (A42), 0–1 The strong Yugoslav Grandmaster is seemingly perplexed by Black's unusual strategy.
- Bent Larsen vs Duncan Suttles, Sousse Interzonal 1967, Modern Defence (B06), 0–1 Larsen was the Chess Oscar winner for 1967, so this win was perhaps the biggest so far for the young Canadian.
- Hans-Joachim Hecht vs Duncan Suttles, Belgrade 1969, Modern Defence (B06), 0–1 Another Modern win over a strong European; the game was decided after a very long endgame.
- Duncan Suttles vs Borislav Ivkov, Belgrade 1969, Modern / Hungarian Opening (A00), 1–0 One of the first games for the new variation, which turns out successfully for White.
- Larry Evans vs Duncan Suttles, San Antonio 1972, Modern Defence (B06), 0–1 The five-time US champion gets schooled in the new ways.
- Ken Rogoff vs Duncan Suttles, Canadian Open, Ottawa 1973, Modern Defence (B06), 0–1 Two young stars debate leading-edge opening ideas.
- Duncan Suttles vs Kevin Spraggett, Canadian Open, Ottawa 1973, Sicilian Defence, Closed Variation (B26), 1–0 Spraggett was one of the best young Canadians at this stage; he would go on to become Canada's top player.
- Walter Browne vs Duncan Suttles, U.S. Open, Chicago 1973, Modern Defence (B06), 0–1 The rising star Browne, an eventual six-time American champion, learns painfully about Suttles's ability to exploit weak squares.
- Duncan Suttles vs Pal Benko, Hastings 1973–74, Modern / Hungarian Opening (A00), 1–0 Benko himself first introduced this variation in the early 1960s, but Suttles shows a few new twists.
- Karl Robatsch vs Duncan Suttles, Nice Olympiad 1974, Modern Defence (A41), 0–1 Suttles shows that he is still one of the world's best with the Modern.
- Lubomir Kavalek vs Duncan Suttles, Nice Olympiad 1974, Pirc Defence (B08), 0–1 Suttles subtly undermines Kavalek's classical opening with an impressive pawn roller at the end.
- Duncan Suttles vs Bent Larsen, Canadian Open, Montreal 1974, English Opening (A13), 1–0 Suttles takes on the four-time world championship candidate, this time on home soil.
- Duncan Suttles vs Samuel Reshevsky, Lone Pine 1975, English Opening (A26), 1–0 Reshevsky was the epitome of orthodoxy in chess, so this game is a fascinating clash of styles.
- Duncan Suttles vs Tony Miles, Vancouver 1981, Modern/Hungarian Opening (A00), 1–0 Miles, after losing this game, would go on to use the variation himself with success.
- Yasser Seirawan vs Duncan Suttles, Vancouver 1981, English Opening (A21), 0–1 Seirawan was one of the world's top young players, and he would develop a style that resembled Suttles's.
- Pal Benko vs Duncan Suttles, Boston 1964, Modern Defence, 1–0 Although Suttles loses the game due to an oversight at the end, it is a wonderful encounter full of tactics and playing like one long combination. Lawrence Day chose it as his favourite for the book, Learn from the Grandmasters.
