= Jonathan Berry (chess player) =

Canadian chess player (born 1953)

Personal information
- Born: Francis Jonathan Berry; 11 September 1953 (age 72) Chilliwack, British Columbia

Chess career
- Country: Canada
- Title: ICCF Grandmaster (1985); FIDE Master (1984); FIDE International Arbiter (1975)
- FIDE rating: 2269 (May 2014)
- Peak rating: 2325 (January 1998)
- ICCF rating: 2545 (July 1998)
- ICCF peak rating: 2578 (July 1993)

Jonathan Berry (born September 11, 1953) is a Canadian International Correspondence Chess Grandmaster, a FIDE Master, a FIDE International Arbiter, and a chess administrator, writer and editor. He is the only Canadian ever to hold international titles for over-the-board chess, correspondence chess, and chess arbiter.

== Chess life ==
Berry, who learned the game at 11, defeated Estonian grandmaster Paul Keres at a simultaneous exhibition in Vancouver when he was 14.

A formative influence was Elod Macskasy, who in the late 1960s mentored a group of young masters that included Berry, Robert Zuk, Bruce Harper, Peter Biyiasis, and Duncan Suttles.

Berry represented the University of British Columbia at the Pan American Intercollegiate Team Chess Championships, Montreal 1969; he graduated from UBC in 1973.

At 16, he had a solid result of tied fourth with 6.5/10 at the 1970 Canadian Open Chess Championship in St. John's; Bent Larsen won. He placed third in the 1970 Junior Canadian Chess Championship, held in Toronto, with 5.5/9. Berry played his first Canadian Closed Chess Championship at Toronto 1972, and finished in the middle of a strong field, scoring 8.5/17; Peter Biyiasas won.

Berry was of national master strength by this time. He tied for third place at the 1972 Canadian Junior Championship in London, Ontario, with 6/9, won the 1974 Vancouver City Closed Championship with 7/8, and won the 1974 Mexican Open Championship at Guadalajara with 7.5/8. In 1975, Berry scored 9/15 at the Canadian Closed / Zonal in Calgary, Alberta, missing the International Master norm by one point; Biyiasas repeated as champion. Berry scored 7.5/10 in the 1976 Canadian Open Chess Championship in Toronto and represented Canada at the 1977 Pan American Individual Championship at Santa Cruz, Bolivia, placing sixth. He scored 5.5/15 at the 1978 Canadian Closed/Zonal in Toronto, a below-average result.

Filling-in on the Canadian team for the 1982 Lucerne Chess Olympiad due to a family emergency of one of the players, Berry played two games on second reserve board, drawing both of them. He was around the 50 percent mark in each of his next four Canadian Championship Zonals: 7/15 at Ottawa (1984); 8/15 at Hamilton, Ontario (1994); 4.5/9 at Brantford, Ontario (1999); and 5.5/11 at Richmond, British Columbia (2002).

Following his return to the west coast in the mid-1980s, Berry won the British Columbia Championship three times: in 1994, in 2000 (first equal), and in 2006 (first equal). Awarded the FIDE Master title in 1984, he was by then living in Nanaimo. He tied for first with John Donaldson at the 1990 Paul Keres Memorial Tournament Tournament in Vancouver, and scored 5.5/9 at the London, England International II in 1997.

Berry also plays blindfold chess. In 2004, he played 12 simultaneous games, which tied the world record for players over the age of 50, scoring +9=2-1.

== Correspondence chess ==
Berry began to play correspondence chess in 1967. He qualified for his first Canadian Championship (K33) in 1976–1978, placing third with 10/13. He won K34 (1977–1978) with 7/8, and K36 (1979–1981) with 7.5/9. In the 60th Anniversary International tournament of the Canadian Correspondence Chess Association (CCCA), from 1981–1985, he placed equal second, with 10/14. In the 3/4 finals for the 13th World Correspondence Chess Championship, running from 1984–1989, he scored 9/13, and qualified for the finals, where he scored 6/16, for 13th place. Berry was awarded the title of International Grandmaster of Correspondence Chess by the International Correspondence Chess Federation in 1985. Representing Canada on board two in the XI Correspondence Olympiad, he scored 7/9 in the preliminaries, helping Canada to qualify for the finals; there, again on board two, he scored 5/12.

== Chess arbiter ==
Berry began to assist in running tournaments in his teens. He was vacationing in Mexico in 1973 when he was asked to direct the Mexican Zonal qualifier. He then ran the first Pan American Individual Championship at Winnipeg 1974, the 1974 Canadian Junior Championship in Vancouver, and Vancouver 1975, an international tournament with 320 players that was won by Keres. Based upon these four major events, FIDE awarded him the International Arbiter title in 1975; at 22, he was the youngest ever at that time.

Berry directed the Grand Manan International 1984. He also became involved at the Olympiad level later that same year in Thessaloniki. He returned to the Olympiad in 1996 Yerevan, 2000 Istanbul, and 2004 Calvià. He was assistant arbiter for the seven Candidates' matches at the 1988 World Chess Festival, Saint John, New Brunswick, the largest chess event ever held in Canada. He helped to run the 1988 World Rapid Championships in Mazatlán. From 1994–1999, he was head arbiter for the North Bay International Open series of six tournaments, which averaged over 250 players. Berry was head arbiter for the 25th anniversary of the Keres Memorial Tournament, Vancouver 2000, and an assistant arbiter at the U.S. Chess Championship, Seattle, in 2002–2003.

He oversaw three Canadian Open Chess Championships: Winnipeg 1986, Kapuskasing 2003 (where he introduced the "Kap" pairing system), and Ottawa 2007, where a record 22 grandmasters participated and where he introduced for the first time in Canada the Capelle la Grande pairing system.

In 2014, Berry received a service award from FIDE.

== Chess administrator ==
While still a university student, Berry was president of the British Columbia Chess Federation.

He served as executive director of the Chess Federation of Canada from 1975–1983.

== Publications ==
- Canadian Junior Chess Championship 74: Tournament Book of the Fourth Canadian Junior Chess Championship (1974)
- 62nd Canadian Closed Chess Championship and Zonal Tournament, Toronto 1978 (1978)
- Diamond Dust (1991) (with John Wright), the book of the international grandmaster correspondence tournament organized to celebrate CCCA's 60th anniversary
- The Pocket Guide to Chess (2005)
- Chess columnist, Globe and Mail (1981–2012)
- Chess columnist, Ottawa Journal (1975–1980); he was voted chess columnist of the year in 1977
- Editor, CFC Bulletin (later called Chess Canada) (1975–1983), and later an occasional contributor
- Technical editor, Inside Chess (1988–2000)
- Technical/layout editor, Chess on the Edge (2008), the Duncan Suttles chess project published in three volumes

Berry was inducted into the Canadian Chess Hall of Fame in 2001.
