= George Kuprejanov =

Canadian chess player (1938–1991)

Personal information
- Born: March 6, 1938 Bjelovar, Croatia
- Died: April 23, 1991 (aged 53) Canada

Chess career
- Country: Yugoslavia; Canada
- Title: International Master (1972)

George Kuprejanov (6 March 1938 – 23 April 1991) was a Canadian chess master.

== Biography ==
Born in Bjelovar, Croatia, Kuprejanov participated in the Yugoslav Chess Championship in 1963 and in an international tournament at Zagreb, 1964. He won the open tournament at Monte Carlo in 1968.

That same year, he moved to Canada. Kuprejanov won the Toronto Chess Championship in 1971 (together with Géza Füster). He participated in the Canadian Chess Championship, achieving his best result in 1972, when he shared 2nd place with Lawrence Day; Peter Biyiasas won.

Kuprejanov was awarded the FIDE International Master title in 1972.

In 1974, he played 4th board on the Canadian team at the 21st Chess Olympiad in Nice with a score of +6, =5, -3.

Kuprejanov also published articles in Chess Canada, the journal of the Chess Federation of Canada.
