= Peter Biyiasas =

Canadian chess grandmaster (born 1950)

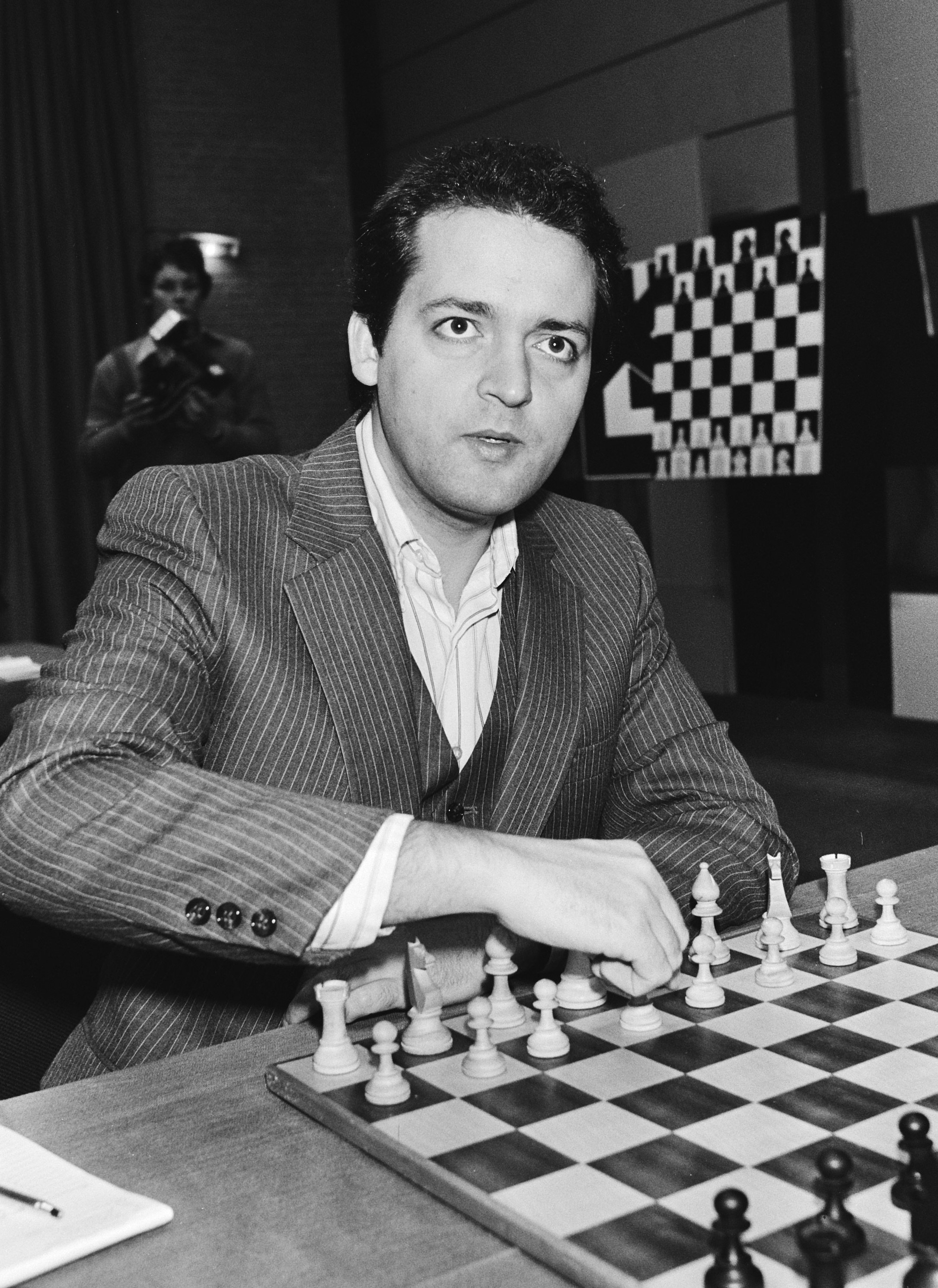
- Biyiasas at the Wijk an Zee Tournament, 1980

Personal information
- Born: November 19, 1950 (age 75) Athens, Greece
- Spouse: Ruth Haring (m. 1978; div. 2005)

Chess career
- Country: Canada (before 1980); United States (after 1980)
- Title: Grandmaster (1978)
- FIDE rating: 2450 (October 2026)
- Peak rating: 2485 (January 1979)

Peter Biyiasas (born November 19, 1950) is a Canadian chess grandmaster. He was Canadian champion in 1972 and 1975, represented Canada with success on four Olympiad teams, and played in two Interzonals. He moved to the United States in 1979, settling in California. He retired from competitive play in the mid-1980s to work as a computer programmer. During the late 1970s and early 1980s, he was a frequent training partner of Bobby Fischer, who stayed at his home in San Francisco for extended periods.

== Early years ==
Born in Athens, Greece, Biyiasas moved to Canada as a young boy, and grew up in Winnipeg and Vancouver. He won the first of his four British Columbia chess championships in 1968; he would repeat in 1969, 1971, and 1972. He played in the 1969 Closed Canadian Chess Championship at Pointe Claire, and finished in the middle of the field; Duncan Suttles won. Biyiasas was of National Master strength by this time. He represented Canada as second reserve on its bronze medal-winning team at the 1971 World Students' Olympiad in Mayagüez, Puerto Rico, where he scored 5/7 (+4 −1 =2). He graduated from the University of British Columbia in 1972 with a bachelor's degree in mathematics. He won the first of his three British Columbia Open titles in 1972, and repeated in 1976 and 1978.

== Canadian Champion, International Master ==
Biyiasas won the Zonal Closed Canadian Championship, Toronto 1972, with 12/17, half a point ahead of Lawrence Day and George Kuprejanov. For this, he earned the International Master title, as did Day and Kuprejanov. It marked an enormous leap in class for him in just one year, from second reserve on the Canadian student team to national champion.

Biyiasas tied for 1st–4th places at Norristown 1973 at 7½/11, along with Kenneth Rogoff, Bruno Parma, and Hermann Pilnik. He struggled in his first super-strong tournament, the 1973 Petropolis Interzonal, with 6½/17, for 15th place; Henrique Mecking won. But he stayed on in Brazil for the São Paulo event, and placed respectably with 6½/13. Biyiasas won the British Columbia Diamond Jubilee Open in 1973, and repeated in 1974 and 1976.

He notched a strong third place at the 1974 Pan American Chess Championship in Winnipeg with 11/15; Walter Browne won. He tied with Kim Commons for the American Open title in 1974. He repeated as Canadian champion in the Zonal at Calgary 1975 with 12/15, half a point ahead of Kevin Spraggett. This earned him another Interzonal chance at Manila 1976, where he finished with 6/19 for 17th place; Mecking won again.

== Medals in Olympiads ==
Biyiasas made four appearances for Canada in chess Olympiad competition. He won board medals on three occasions, including a silver and two bronzes, scored (+28 −7 =18) overall, for 70 per cent, and helped Canada to some of its best-ever team finishes in 1976 (8th) and 1978 (11th).

- 1972 Skopje board 4: 11½/15 (+8 −0 =7), bronze medal;
- 1974 Nice board 2: 9½/17 (+7 −5 =5);
- 1976 Haifa board 1: 7½/10 (+6 −1 =3); bronze medal;
- 1978 Buenos Aires board 2: 9/12 (+7 −1 =4); silver medal.

== Grandmaster ==
Biyiasas made an excellent tied 3rd–4th at New York City 1977 with 8½/14, as Leonid Shamkovich and Andrew Soltis won. In the Canadian Zonal, Toronto 1978, he finished 2nd with 10/15, as Jean Hébert won. He earned the Grandmaster title in 1978 (making him Canada's third grandmaster after Abe Yanofsky and Duncan Suttles) for his strong performances at the GHI International Open (New York 1978), Lone Pine (1978), and the Haifa Olympiad.

Biyiasas scored 7½/14 at Hastings 1978–79 to tie for 7th–10th places, as Ulf Andersson won. He won the 1979 Paul Keres Memorial tournament in Vancouver. He emigrated to the US in 1979, working in San Jose, California as an IBM computer programmer. Biyiasas scored 6½/15 at Hastings 1979–80 for 13th place, as Andersson won again. One of his strongest career results came in a very strong field at Wijk aan Zee 1980, where he made 7½/13 to tie for 4th–6th places, as Browne and Yasser Seirawan won. He scored an excellent equal 2nd place at Zrenjanin 1980. He played in the United States Chess Championship at Greenville 1980, finishing just below 50 per cent.

Biyiasas won a number of tournaments in the San Francisco area while visiting and after moving there. These included four titles in the Carroll Capps Memorial (1981, 1982, 1983, and 1985), and four titles in the Arthur Stamer Memorial (1978, 1979, 1982, and 1984); the events were organized by the Mechanics Institute Chess Room. He also won the Northern California Championship in 1983.

During a four-month period in 1981, Biyiasis played 17 five-minute games with Bobby Fischer, who was staying in his apartment at the time. Fischer, although he had been absent from competitive play for nine years, won all of them. Biyiasas said that he didn't think Fischer had lost anything in form, despite the layoff.

== Chess style ==
Biyiasas’ formation was influenced in the late 1960s when he joined a group of young masters mentored by Elod Macskasy. He generally favoured unusual openings, staying away from mainline Sicilians after opening with 1.e4. Biyiasas tended towards King's Indian Attack formations, and aimed to get play into complex maneuvering channels. "At his best, he is mathematically thorough," wrote the chess columnist Vic Arcega. "At his worst, he is a 'great escape artist' and has won 'impossible' games."

Biyiasas retired from competitive chess in the mid-1980s.

In 2002, he was inducted into the Canadian Chess Hall of Fame.

He was married to Ruth Haring, a Woman International Master with whom he had three children.

== Notable chess games ==
- Peter Biyiasas vs Werner Hug, Petropolis Interzonal 1973, Sicilian Defence (B40), 1–0 A very attractive miniature.
- Peter Biyiasas vs Efim Geller, Petropolis Interzonal 1973, Sicilian Defence, Moscow / Rossolimo Variation (B52), 1–0 The young Canadian knocks off one of the world's top players.
- Peter Biyiasas vs Mato Damjanovic, Lone Pine 1975, Sicilian Defence / King's Indian Attack (B30), 1–0 Typical Biyiasas win with an unusual opening and plenty of maneuvering.
- Peter Biyiasas vs Kevin Spraggett, Canadian Zonal Championship, Calgary 1975, Sicilian Defence / King's Indian Attack (B40), 1–0 The key game which decided the tournament, between the top two finishers.
- Peter Biyiasas vs Eugenio Torre, Manila Interzonal 1976, King's Indian Defence, Sämisch Variation (E81), 1–0 Broadening his opening repertoire.
- Stefano Tatai vs Peter Biyiasas, Haifa Olympiad 1976, Ruy Lopez, Fianchetto / Smyslov Defence (C60), 0–1 Another unusual opening brings success.
- Jonathan Speelman vs Peter Biyiasas, Lone Pine 1978, English Opening, Great Snake (A10), 0–1 Experimental but successful.
- Peter Biyiasas vs Evgeni Vasiukov, Hastings 1978–79, King's Indian Attack (A07), 1–0 A strong Soviet GM learns to respect the eccentric style of Biyiasas.
- Peter Biyiasas vs Jan Timman, Wijk aan Zee 1980, Sicilian Defence, Moscow / Rossolimo Variation (B50), 1–0 Timman was one of the highest-rated players in the world for 20 years.
- Peter Biyiasas vs Lev Alburt, Lone Pine 1981, Zukertort Opening (A00), 1–0 Another patient strategical grind.
