= Jean Hébert =

Canadian chess player (born 1957)

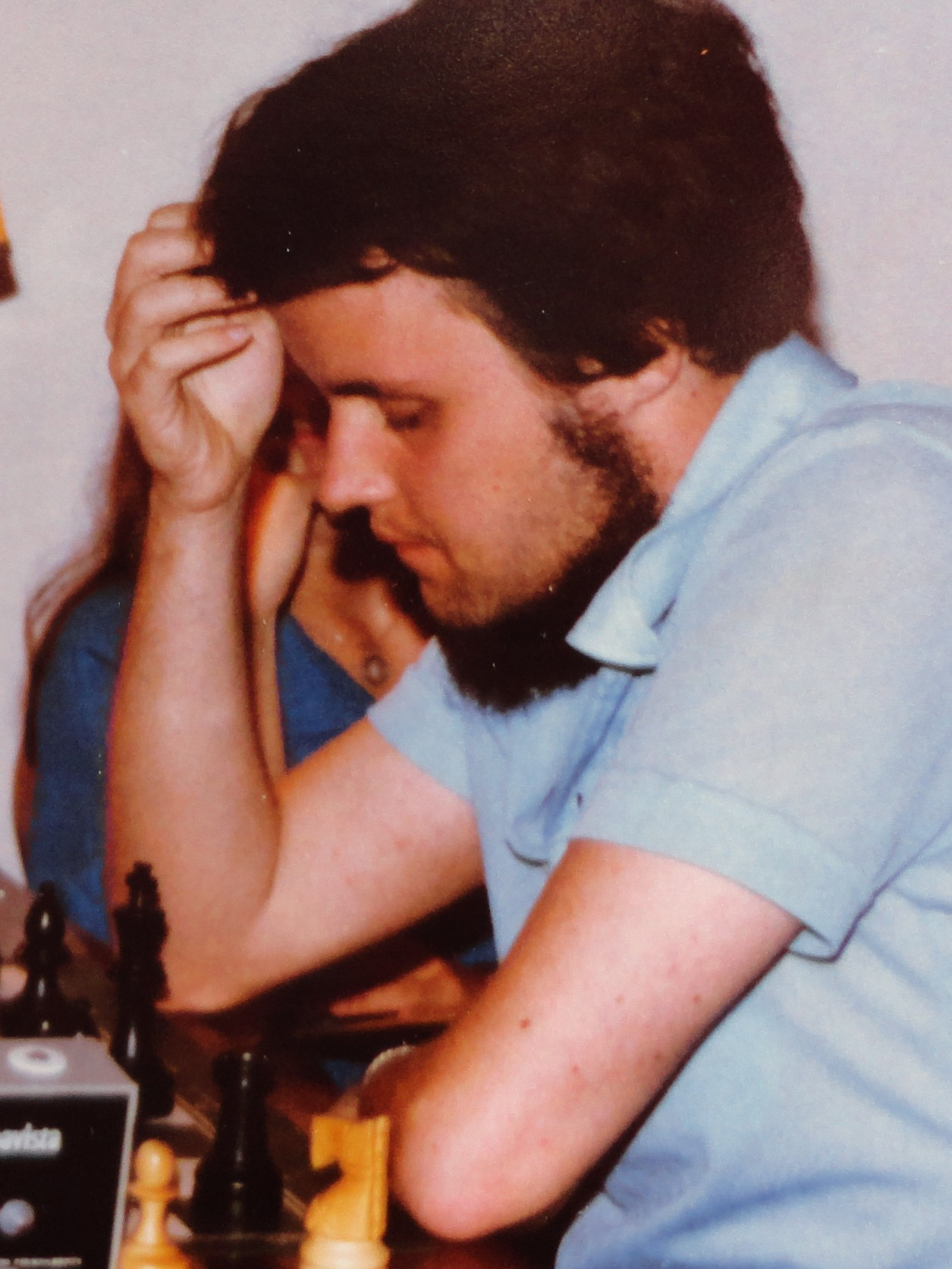
- Hébert, Interzonal Tournament, 1979

Personal information
- Born: November 11, 1957 (age 68) Quebec City, Canada

Chess career
- Country: Canada
- Title: ICCF Grandmaster (1984); FIDE International Master (1978)
- Peak rating: 2465 (January 1997)
- ICCF peak rating: 2512 (July 1996)

Jean Hébert (born November 11, 1957, in Quebec City) is a Canadian chess player, writer, journalist, and commentator who holds the ICCF title of Correspondence Chess Grandmaster and the FIDE title of International Master. The winner of the Canadian Chess Championship in 1978 and 2009, he also tied for the title in 2007, but lost in playoffs. He represented Canada at the 1979 Interzonal tournament as well as seven times at Chess Olympiads. He also took part in the Chess World Cup 2009, but was knocked out by Peter Svidler in the first round. In 2022, Hébert won the Canadian Seniors' Championship.

== Early years ==
Jean Hébert made his first notable mark in chess when, as a 15-year-old first-category player, he won the 1973 Carnaval Open at Quebec City, ahead of several experienced masters. He represented Canada at the 1974 World Under-17 Championship, won the Junior Canadian Chess Championship at Saint John in 1975-76, and represented Canada at the World Junior Chess Championship, Groningen, 1976-77, making an even score of 6.5/13.

== Canadian champion ==
Hébert played in his first Zonal Canadian Chess Championship at Calgary 1975, placing 11th with 5.5/15; the winner was Peter Biyiasas. At his next attempt, Hebert won the 1978 Zonal at Toronto with 11/15, just ahead of Biyiasas. For scoring two-thirds of the possible points, he was awarded the International Master title and, as winner of the event, qualified for the Interzonal tournament the next year. The Interzonal at Rio de Janeiro was his first top-class international competition. He finished with 4.5/17, thus sharing last place with Shimon Kagan; the event was won by Robert Hübner, Lajos Portisch, and Tigran Petrosian. In his Canadian Zonal title defence at Montreal 1981, Hébert scored 10.5/15, but could only tie for 2nd-3rd, behind winner Igor Ivanov. In 2009, 31 years after his first Canadian championship, Hébert won again, this time at Guelph, Ontario. His 7.5/9 score put him a full point ahead of the field.

== At the Olympiads ==
Hébert represented Canada a total of seven times at Chess Olympiads from 1978 to 2002. His first two appearances, in 1978 and 1980, saw the Canadian team score its highest placings ever, with eleventh and ninth-place finishes, respectively. In 72 games, Hébert scored (+25 =25 -22), for 52.1 per cent. His results include:

- Buenos Aires 1978, board 1, 4/11 (+2 =4 -5);
- Valletta 1980, board 1, 7/12 (+4 =6 -2);
- Luzern 1982, board 3, 8.5/12 (+7 =3 -2), board bronze medal;
- Thessaloniki 1984, board 2, 6.5/12 (+5 =3 -4);
- Novi Sad 1990, board 2, 2.5/7 (+2 =1 -4);
- Yerevan 1996, board 3, 7/12 (+4 =6 -2);
- Bled 2002, 2nd reserve, 2/6 (+1 =2 -3).

== Correspondence chess grandmaster ==
Hébert has also excelled at correspondence chess. He placed second in the 1976 Canadian Correspondence Championship, and was a member of the Canadian team at the 11th ICCF Olympiad, which won the bronze medal. Hébert was awarded the International Grandmaster of Correspondence Chess title in 1984.

== Quebec successes ==
Hébert has enjoyed considerable success in Quebec provincial championships, at both the Open and Closed levels, as well as in other home-based events. He won the 1980 Montreal Invitational with 6/8, and drew an exhibition match 2-2 with Kevin Spraggett that year. Hébert faced Spraggett again in a playoff match in 1982, after the two had tied for 2nd-3rd places in the 1981 Zonal, for a reserve place in the Interzonal. This time, Spraggett prevailed by 3.5-0.5. Hébert shared 2nd-3rd places in the Quebec Closed at Montreal 1983 with 6/9, behind Spraggett. He shared 1st-2nd places in the 1985 Quebec Closed on 8.5/11 with George Levtchouk. Hébert placed tied 3rd-4th in the 1985 Canadian Chess Championship with 6.5/9, as Ivanov and Sylvain Barbeau shared the top spots. He finished 2nd in the Quebec Closed 1988 with 8.5/11 behind Ivanov. Hébert won the 1990 Quebec Closed with 7.5/9.

He shared first in the 2002 Canadian Open Chess Championship at Montreal, with 8/10. Hébert has won the Quebec Open Chess Championship five times (1989, 1990, 1994, 2002, 2005), which ties the record for the most titles in that event; he also won the B Section of the Open in 2011, 2012 and 2014.

== Legacy and writings ==
Hébert is the first Canadian Francophone chess player to establish a solid international reputation by playing in the 1979 Interzonal and with his seven Chess Olympiad appearances, earning a bronze medal in 1982. His 1978 victory at the Canadian Chess Championship made him the first Francophone to win since 1884. He is also the first Canadian Francophone to earn the correspondence grandmaster title, and is one of the few players to achieve international titles in both over-the-board and correspondence play. His publications include:

- Karpov - Korchnoi 1978 (in French);
- Border Wars III: The Book of the Third North American Correspondence Chess Championship (1984)
- Secrets des grandes parties au coup par coup (Payot, 2001, in French)
- Leçons d'échecs du tournoi international de Montréal 2001 (Chess'n Math Association in French);
- Le livre du tournoi international de Montréal 2002 (Chess'n Math Association in French);
- Modern Benoni CD ChessBase.

Hébert has been a respected commentator at major chess matches and events, such as the 1989 Quebec City Candidates match between Kevin Spraggett and Artur Yusupov. He served as editor of the magazine Echecs+, published by the Quebec Chess Federation. He was the chess columnist for La Presse, contributed to New In Chess, and published the magazine Au nom du roi, which was succeeded by the e-bulletin, Hébert parle échecs. He served for a time as a columnist and games analyst with Chess Canada magazine. Hébert was inducted into the Canadian Chess Hall of Fame in 2001.

After reaching the Canadian title at age 20 in 1978, Hébert, despite significant improvement after that time, was surpassed in Canadian chess by the 1980 arrival of the Soviet defector, Igor Ivanov, and also by Kevin Spraggett, over whom he at first had an edge.

== Competitive resurgence ==
Hébert showed that he was a durable competitor with his first-place tie at the 2007 Canadian Championship at Kitchener; Nikolay Noritsyn won the playoffs.

Hébert surpassed that performance when he won the 2009 Canadian Chess Championship at Guelph with a score of 7.5/9 - a full point ahead of runner-up Mark Bluvshtein - which, at 51, made him the oldest Canadian champion ever. That same year, he won the Quebec Closed, the Montreal Open, and, on tiebreak, the championship of the French-speaking world in Vallée D'Aoste, Italy.

In 2022, Hébert won the Canadian Seniors championship at Halifax. He then participated in the World Senior Chess Championship in Italy, finishing in a tie for sixth-ninth places, one point behind the tournament winner, John Nunn.
