= Angela Day =

Canadian chess player (born 1952)

Personal information
- Born: 10 June 1952 (age 74)
- Spouse: Lawrence Day (divorced)

Chess career
- Country: Canada
- Title: Woman International Master (1982)
- Peak rating: 1905 (July 1985)

Angela Day (born 10 June 1952) is a Canadian chess player who has held the FIDE title of Woman International Master (WIM) since 1982. She is a two-time Canadian Women's Chess Championship medalist (1975, 1981).

== Biography ==
From the mid-1970s to the early 1980s, Angela Day was one of Canada's leading female chess players. In 1975, she won silver medal and in 1981 she won bronze medal in Canadian Women's Chess Championship.

Day played for Canada in the Women's Chess Olympiads:

- In 1976, at third board in the 7th Chess Olympiad (women) in Haifa (+0, =3, -5),
- In 1978, at second board in the 8th Chess Olympiad (women) in Buenos Aires (+4, =6, -4),
- In 1980, at first reserve board in the 9th Chess Olympiad (women) in Valletta (+2, =2, -5).

She was married to Canadian chess player Lawrence Day.
