= Alexandre Lesiège =

Canadian chess grandmaster (born 1975)

Alexandre Le Siège
Personal information
- Born: 18 August 1975 (age 50) Montreal, Quebec

Chess career
- Country: Canada
- Title: Grandmaster (1999)
- FIDE rating: 2455 (July 2026)
- Peak rating: 2589 (October 2001)

Alexandre Le Siège (born 18 August 1975 in Montreal), also known as Alexandre Lesiège, is a Canadian chess player who holds the FIDE title of Grandmaster. He has won three Canadian championships and represented Canada in world championship qualifying events and Olympiads.

== Biography ==
Le Siège was first introduced to chess at age six. He began playing in local events organized by Chess 'N Math, and had a candidate master rating by age 11. His first important success was winning the Canadian Junior Championship in 1989, at 14, with a score of +10, =1. He followed up by winning the 1991 Quebec Invitational Championship.

Le Siège, at 16, won the 1992 Canadian Chess Championship at Kingston, Ontario, defeating Kevin Spraggett in the key game. This made him the second-youngest Canadian champion ever, after Abe Yanofsky, who also was 16 when he won in 1941. Awarded the International Master title, Le Siège qualified for the 1993 Interzonal Tournament at Biel, Switzerland. In 1997 he won The Quebec Open.

He won the Canadian title again in 1999 at Brantford and in 2001 at Montreal after winning a tie-break playoff against Spraggett. He earned the grandmaster title at the 1999 Quebec Open in Montreal with his third and final required title norm, thus becoming the first Canadian francophone to earn the highest title in chess. He represented Canada in Olympiad team chess events, twice on top board, with success.

Le Siège virtually retired from competitive chess from 2004 to 2015, when he resumed by defeating Evgeny Bareev in a rapid match 1.5-0.5. He subsequently was a member of the Canadian Olympiad team and won the Quebec and Canadian International opens.

In 2022, Le Siège was elected to the Canadian Chess Hall of Fame.
