= Denis Allan =

Canadian chess player (born 1944)

Personal information
- Born: 21 November 1944 (age 81) Swan River, Manitoba, Canada

Chess career
- Country: Canada
- Title: FIDE Master (1987)
- Peak rating: 2380 (July 1971)

Denis Allan (born 21 November 1944) is a Canadian chess player who holds the titles of FIDE Master (FM) (1987) and Canadian Open Chess Championship winner (1984).

== Biography ==
Denis Allan won the Open Chess Championship in 1970. He shared first place at the Canadian Open Chess Championship in 1984. He was one of only four players to compete in the Canadian Chess Championship in each of four consecutive decades from the 1960s to the 1990s. In 1987, in Szirak, Denis Allan participated in the World Chess Championship Interzonal Tournament, where he ranked 18th of twenty participants.

Denis Allan played for Canada in the Chess Olympiads:

- in 1968, at the fourth board in the 18th Chess Olympiad in Lugano (+4, =4, -4),
- in 1980, at the second reserve board in the 24th Chess Olympiad in La Valletta (+1, =1, -3),
- in 1986, at the second reserve board in the 27th Chess Olympiad in Dubai (+0, =0, -1).

Denis Allan played for Canada in the World Student Team Chess Championship:

- in 1971, at the first reserve board in the 18th World Student Team Chess Championship in Mayagüez (+6, =1, -1), winning a team bronze medal.
