= Tal Baron =

Israeli chess grandmaster (born 1992)

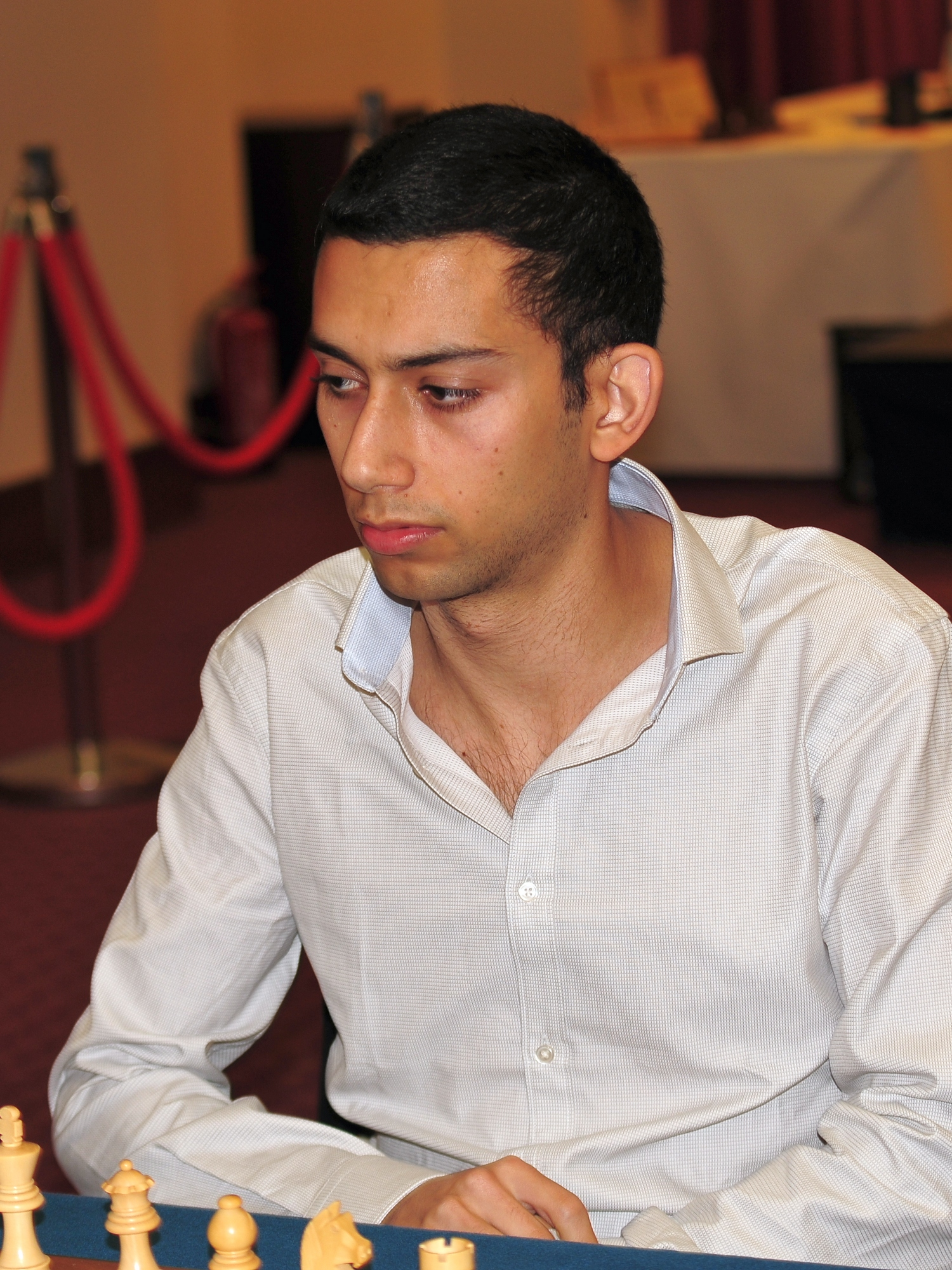
- Tal Baron in 2013

Personal information
- Native name: טל בר און
- Born: 7 August 1992 (age 33) Tel Aviv, Israel

Chess career
- Country: Israel
- Title: Grandmaster (2011)
- FIDE rating: 2410 (July 2026)
- Peak rating: 2560 (August 2016)

Tal Baron (Hebrew: טל בר און; born August 7, 1992, in Tel Aviv) is an Israeli chess Grandmaster. As of May 2021, he is ranked 15th in Israel.

== Life ==
Baron was born in Tel Aviv, where he also attended high school. He acquired the title of International Master in 2010, having completed the required norms in December 2008 at the Israeli championship in Haifa and in 2010 at the European championship in Rijeka. He was awarded the title of Grandmaster on June 2, 2011. He completed the requirements necessary to obtain the title of Grandmaster at the 26th Czerniak Memorial Tournament. At the time, Baron was the youngest Grandmaster in Israeli history, a title he retains as of 2023.

In August 2016, Baron was selected to represent Israel on the Israeli National Chess Olympiad team in Baku, Azerbaijan.

In April 2017, Baron posted a video sharing the context of using a chess computer in the final round of an online tournament on Chess.com.

He won the gold medal in the second GM group at the 2017 Maccabiah Games, in which former Women's World Champion, Ukrainian grandmaster Anna Ushenina took the silver medal.

In 2019, he won 2nd- 3rd place in the Netanya International Chess Championship along with Alexander Moiseenko.
