= Dimitri Tyomkin =

Israeli chess grandmaster (born 1977)

Personal information
- Born: March 25, 1977 (age 49)

Chess career
- Country: Israel (until 2002; since 2026); Canada (2002–2026)
- Title: Grandmaster (2001)
- Peak rating: 2522 (July 2000)

Dimitri Tyomkin (Hebrew: דימיטרי טיומקין; born March 25, 1977) is an Israeli chess grandmaster (2001).

== Career ==
In 1997 he won the Israeli Junior Championship and the European Junior Chess Championship in Tallinn. In 2004 he tied for 1st–2nd with Alexander Moiseenko in the Canadian Open Chess Championship in Kapuskasing and tied for 3rd–6th with Igor Zugic, Mark Bluvshtein and Tomas Krnan in the Canadian Chess Championship in Toronto. He played for Canada in the Chess Olympiad of 2004.

== Notable games ==
- Dimitri Tyomkin vs M Hidalgo, XV Carlos Torre 2002, Sicilian Defense: Old Sicilian. General (B30), 1-0
- Dimitri Tyomkin vs Semen I Dvoirys, Beer Shiva Rapid 2004, Sicilian Defense: Najdorf Variation (B91), 1-0
