= Ruth Haring =

American chess player (1955–2018)

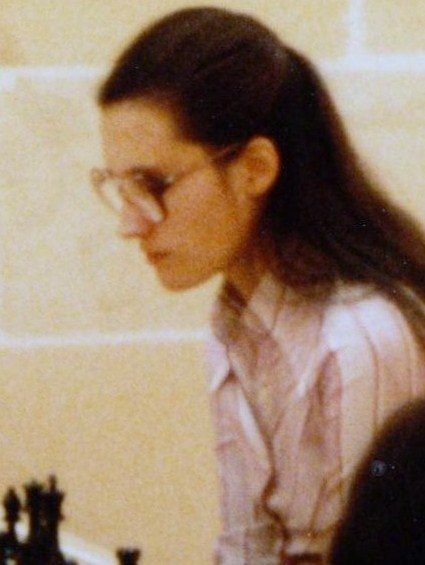
- Haring in 1980

Personal information
- Born: Ruth Inez Haring; January 23, 1955 Barnstable County, Massachusetts, U.S.
- Died: November 29, 2018 (aged 63) Chico, California, U.S.
- Spouses: Bill Orton (divorced) Peter Biyiasas (m. 1978; div. 2005)

Chess career
- Country: United States
- Title: Woman International Master (1977)
- Peak rating: 2120 (January 1987)

Ruth Inez Haring (January 23, 1955 – November 29, 2018), also known as Ruth Orton, was an American chess player who held the FIDE title of Woman International Master (WIM). She competed in the United States Women's Championship in the 1970s and 1980s, and represented the US in the 1974, 1976, 1978, 1980, and 1982 Chess Olympiads.

Haring was elected to the US Chess Federation Executive Board in 2009 and served as vice-president for two years, then as president for four years. She was reelected in 2013 for a three-year term, and served on the executive board for seven years. She served on the CalChess Board of Directors, and was the FIDE Zonal President for zone 2.1, the U.S.A.

== Personal life ==
Haring was born January 23, 1955, on Cape Cod in Barnstable County, Massachusetts. She starting playing chess while growing up in Fairbanks, Alaska. She joined the US Chess Federation at the age of 14 and first played competitively in Fayetteville, Arkansas. She graduated from the University of Arkansas, where she earned a bachelor's degree in psychology, and studied computer science at San Jose State University. Haring worked for companies including IBM and eBay prior to her work at the US Chess Federation.

Her first husband was Bill Orton, who was also a chess player. She married chess Grandmaster Peter Biyiasas in 1978 and divorced in 2005. She and Biyiasas had three children: Lauren, Tina, and Theodore.

== Death and tribute ==
Haring died November 29, 2018, at the age of 63, in Chico, California.

In 2019, US Chess renamed the National Girls Tournament of Champions to the Ruth Haring National Girls Tournament of Champions (RHNGTOC) in her honor.
