= Alexander Moiseenko =

Ukrainian chess grandmaster (born 1980)

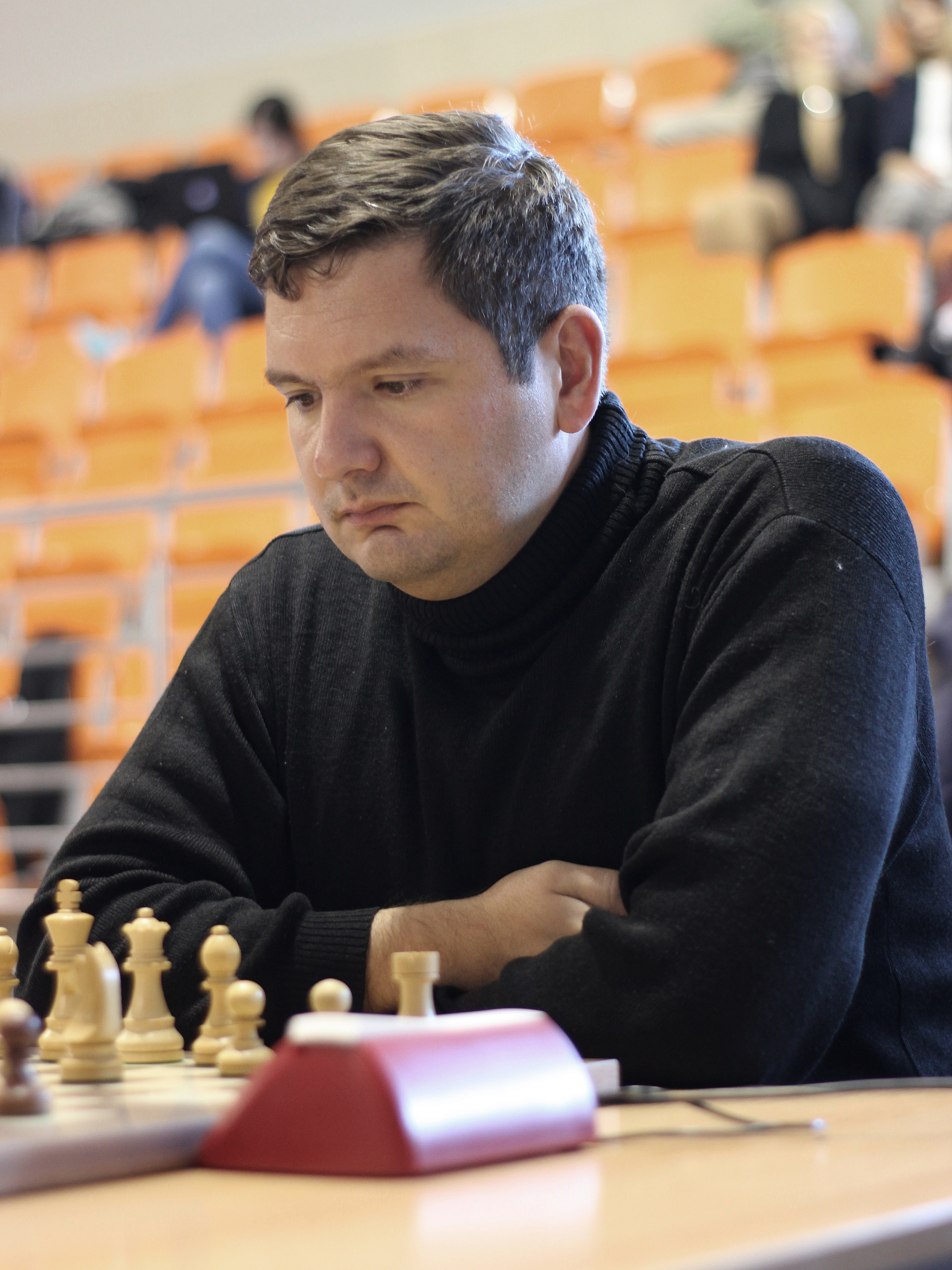
- Moiseenko in 2018

Personal information
- Born: 17 May 1980 (age 46) Severomorsk, Russian SFSR, Soviet Union

Chess career
- Country: Ukraine
- Title: Grandmaster (2000)
- FIDE rating: 2569 (October 2026)
- Peak rating: 2726 (September 2011)
- Peak ranking: No. 22 (September 2011)

Alexander Alexandrovich Moiseenko (Ukrainian: Олександр Моїсеєнко, Oleksandr Moiseyenko; born 17 May 1980) is a Ukrainian chess grandmaster and the 2013 European champion. He was a member of the gold medal-winning Ukrainian team at the Chess Olympiads of 2004 and 2010.

== Biography ==
Born in Severomorsk to a Ukrainian family, Moiseenko moved with his family to Kharkiv, Ukraine when he was nine. He won the World Championship for boys Under-16 in Spain in 1996, and was awarded the International Master title. He improved his standard steadily over the next several years. He placed 2nd at the Ukrainian Junior Championship, Kharkiv 1998, with 7/11. In the European Junior Chess Championship of 1998, held in Mureck, he scored 6.5/9 for a shared second place.

Moiseenko tied for first place in the 1999 Ukrainian Chess Championship in Alushta. In the Ukrainian Grandmaster event of 1999, he finished clear first with 10/13, earning a Grandmaster norm. He then tied for first place at Orel 1999 with 8/11. In the Krasnodar Kuban event of 1999, he won with 7.5/11. This set of excellent results earned him the Grandmaster title. He was second in the Ukrainian Junior Championship at Kharkiv 2000 with 7.5/11.

In 2003, Moiseenko scored 8.5/13 at the European Individual Chess Championship in Istanbul for a shared 4-11th place. This qualified him into the FIDE World Chess Championship 2004 in Tripoli. In the latter, he defeated Sergey Dolmatov in round one by 1.5-0.5 to advance. In round two, he defeated Victor Bologan by 2.5-1.5 in playoffs. He was knocked out in round three by Vladimir Akopian by 0.5-1.5.

At the 2003 Guelph International Pro-Am, Moiseenko scored 6.5/9 for a shared 3rd-5th place. In the same year he won the Toronto Chess'n Math Association Futurity with 8.5/10 and the Canadian Open Chess Championship in Kapuskasing with 8/10. The next year at the same site, he defended his title in that championship, shared with Dimitri Tyomkin, on 8/10. He won the 2004 Guelph International Pro-Am with 7.5/9. He shared 2nd-3rd places at the Montreal International 2004 with 7/11. In the 2005 Canadian Open Championship in Edmonton, he scored 7/10 in an elite field, for a shared 12-27th place. He won the Quebec Open in Montreal 2006 with 8/9, and shared 3rd-9th places at the 2006 Canadian Open Championship in Kitchener with 6.5/9. In 2006, he also won the Cappelle-la-Grande Open with 7,5/9.

In 2007, Moiseenko won the Arctic Chess Challenge in Tromsø scoring 7.5/9, half point ahead of Kjetil A. Lie, Vugar Gashimov and Magnus Carlsen.

Moiseenko tied for first, with 6.5/9, in the 2008 Canadian Open Championship in Montreal, and he also won the 2008 Edmonton International tournament, with 7/9, ahead of former U.S. champion Alexander Shabalov. In 2009 he tied for first place with Étienne Bacrot in the Aeroflot Open in Moscow, placing second on tiebreak.

In 2014, he was joint winner with Maxim Matlakov of the Moscow Open.

He won a silver medal in chess at the 2017 Maccabiah Games in Israel, behind German Georg Meier.

In 2019, Moiseenko won 2nd- 3rd place in the Netanya International Chess Championship along with Tal Baron.

=== Team competitions ===
Moiseenko has played for Ukraine at the Chess Olympiads six times, at the World Team Chess Championship five times (2005, 2011, 2013, 2015, 2017), at the European Team Chess Championship five times (2003, 2005, 2007, 2011, 2013).

Chess Olympiads

- Bled 2002, 2nd reserve, 7/9 (+5 =4 −0)
- Calvià 2004, board 4, 5/8 (+3 =4 −1), team gold
- Turin 2006, 1st reserve, 4/6 (+4 =0 −2)
- Khanty-Mansysk 2010, reserve, 2.5/4 (+2 =1 -1), team gold
- Istanbul 2012, reserve, 5/7 (+4 =2 -1), team bronze
- Tromsø 2014, reserve, 7/9 (+5 =4 -0), board silver

World Team Chess Championship

- Beersheva 2005, 1st reserve, 1.5/3 (+1 =1 −1)
- Ningbo 2011, board 4, 6/8 (+4 =4 −0)
- Antalya 2013, board 3, 4/7 (+1 =6 −0)
- Tsaghkadzor 2015, reserve, 4/6 (+2 =4 −0)
- Khanty-Mansiysk 2017, board 4, 5.5/8 (+3 =5 −0)

European Team Chess Championship

- Plovdiv 2003, board 2, 5/8 (+3 =4 −1)
- Gothenburg 2005, board 3, 6/8 (+5 =2 −1), board bronze
- Crete 2007, board 4, 1.5/4, (+1 =1 −2)
- Novi Sad 2011, board 4, 3.5/7, (+2 =3 −2)
- Porto Carras 2013, board 4, 5.5/8, (+4 =3 −1)
