= Larry Bevand =

Canadian chess arbiter and organiser

Larry Bevand (born September 11, 1953 in Montreal, Quebec) is a Canadian chess arbiter and organiser. He was awarded the title of International Arbiter by FIDE, the World Chess Federation, in 1982. Bevand was also given the title of National Tournament Director by the Canadian Chess Federation in 2004.

Bevand is Executive Director of the Chess'n Math Association (CMA) which he helped found in 1985. He was inducted into the Canadian Chess Hall of Fame in 2001.

In 2012, Larry Bevand was awarded the "Queen Elizabeth II Diamond Jubilee Medal" in recognition of his contributions to Canada.
