= Elod Macskasy =

Hungarian-Canadian chess player (1919–1990)

Personal information
- Born: 7 April 1919 Arad, Hungary
- Died: 21 January 1990 (aged 70) Vancouver, British Columbia, Canada

Chess career
- Country: Hungary; Canada
- Title: National Master (Hungary and Canada)
- Peak rating: 2290 (July 1971)

Elod Macskasy (Hungarian: Macskásy Előd) (7 April 1919 – 21 January 1990) was a Hungarian-Canadian chess master. He was a mathematics professor by profession.

== Early life and education ==
Macskasy was born in Arad, which at the time was part of the Kingdom of Hungary, but was shortly afterwards ceded to Romania by the Treaty of Trianon. He completed his early schooling there, and at age 16 won the city's chess championship. He also competed for Hungary in swimming at the 1936 Berlin Olympics.

He studied mathematics in Budapest from 1937 to 1942, at Pázmány Péter University, earning his doctorate. During this time, he competed with some success in team and student chess tournaments.

Macskasy scored 1/1 on the first reserve board for Hungary at the 2nd Balkaniad, Sofia 1947; his team won the gold medal. In 1947, he gained the Hungarian National Master title following his performance in the 1947 Hungarian championship. Perhaps his best Hungarian result occurred in 1952, when he won a Master tournament ahead of Árpád Vajda, István Bilek and Károly Honfi. Macskasy co-authored a book on the 1952 Hungarian championship.

== Life in Canada ==
Following the Hungarian Revolution of 1956, he emigrated to Canada, where he secured a position as professor of mathematics at the University of British Columbia in Vancouver.

He was a surprise winner of the 1958 Canadian Open Championship, at Winnipeg, ahead of Larry Evans, with 9/10. Macskasy won the British Columbia Championship for five straight years, from 1958 to 1962, and shared this title in 1967. He continued to play often in this event, generally scoring well, into the late 1980s.

In 1961, he played an eight-game training match with Abe Yanofsky, Canada's top player, in Vancouver, losing +2 =1 -5; the match helped Yanofsky to prepare for the 1962 Stockholm Interzonal.

Macskasy competed several times in the Canadian Chess Championship, generally with good results. At Brockville 1961, he tied for 5-6th, with 6/11. At Winnipeg 1963, he was third, with 10/15. At Vancouver 1965, he finished tied 4-5th, with 6 ½/11. At Toronto 1972, he scored 8 ½/17 for a tied 12-13th. At Calgary 1975, at age 56, he struggled with 5/15 for a shared 12-13th.

In the early 1960s, he had a Canadian Chess Federation rating of 2400, indicating a player of International Master strength; however, he was never awarded the FIDE title.

Macskasy represented Canada twice at Chess Olympiads: 1964 at Tel Aviv on board 4: 5/13 (+3 =4 -6); 1968 at Lugano on board 3: 6 ½/13 (+4 =5 -4). He remained a strong player throughout his life, maintaining a master's rating of over 2200 until his final tournament, the 1989 Paul Keres Memorial in Vancouver.

He co-edited the magazine Canadian Chess Chat for many years from the late 1950s.

He was a chess mentor, notably in the late 1960s, when he mentored a group of young British Columbia masters that included Robert Zuk, Bruce Harper, Jonathan Berry, Peter Biyiasis, and Duncan Suttles.

Macskasy died unexpectedly on 21 January 1990.
