= Anthony Saidy =

American chess player and physician (born 1937)

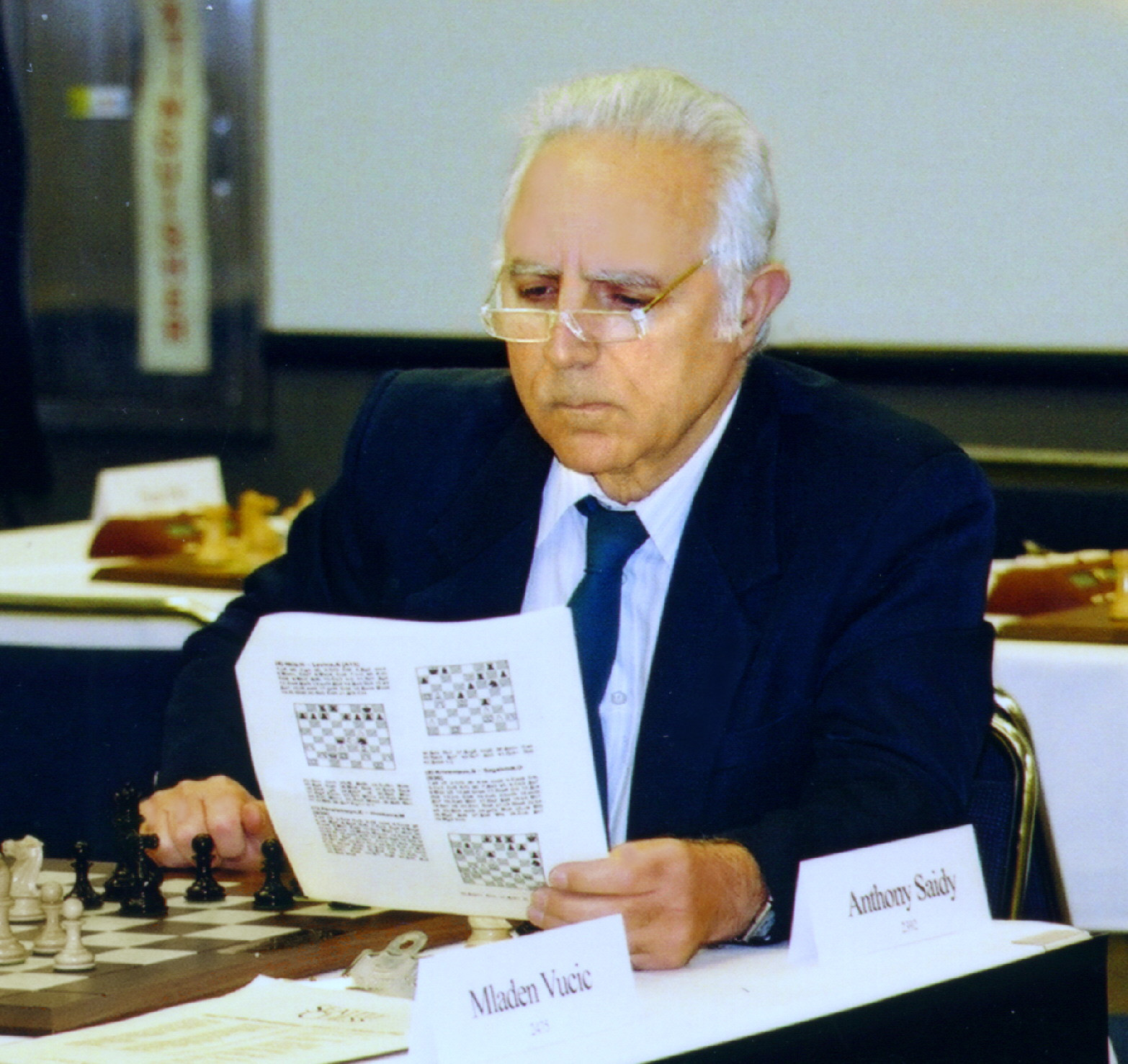
- Saidy at the 2002 U.S. Chess Championships in Seattle, Washington

Personal information
- Born: May 16, 1937 (age 89) New York, U.S.

Chess career
- Country: United States
- Title: International Master (1969)
- Peak rating: 2445 (January 1975)

Anthony Saidy (born May 16, 1937) is an American chess International Master, a retired physician and author. He competed eight times in the U.S. Chess Championship, with his highest placement being 4th. He won the 1960 Canadian Open Chess Championship. The same year, he played on the U.S. Team in the World Student Team Championship in Leningrad, USSR. The U.S. team won the World Championship, the only time the U.S. has ever won that event.

Saidy is the author of several chess books, including The Battle of Chess Ideas, and The World of Chess (with Norman Lessing). His most recent book, 1983, a Dialectical Novel, is a work of "what if" political fiction inspired by Saidy's four sojourns in the USSR, during which he was able to get to know Russians from all walks of life in both public and intimate settings. Harrison Salisbury, Pulitzer Prize-winning Moscow correspondent of the New York Times, said that it had the "ring of truth."

As an older mentor he befriended Robert James Fischer (Bobby Fischer). It was in Saidy's family home in Douglaston, Long Island that Fischer secluded himself prior to the World Chess Championship 1972. Saidy and others successfully encouraged the apparently reluctant Fischer to go to Iceland, where he won the world crown in a match against holder Boris Spassky.

Saidy is the son of playwright Fred Saidy.

== Books ==
- 1967 U.S. Open Chess Championship : Atlanta, Georgia (with L. Dave Truesdel Jr), International Chess Imports, 1967
- The World of Chess (with Norman Lessing), Random House, 1974
- The Battle of Chess Ideas, RHM, 1975
- The March of Chess Ideas, McKay, 1994
- 1983: A Dialectical Novel, Seagull Press, 2013
