= Canadian Open Chess Championship =

Annual chess championship held in Canada

The Canadian Open Chess Championship is Canada's Open chess championship, first held in 1956, and held annually since 1973, usually in mid-summer. It is organized by the Chess Federation of Canada. The event celebrated its 50th rendition in 2013.

== History ==
It was organized every two years from 1956 until 1970. The tournament rotates around the country, and has been held in eight of Canada's ten provinces during its 63-year history, missing only Nova Scotia and Prince Edward Island. The format has usually been a Swiss system with nine or ten rounds, usually over a nine-day period. It is open to all players who wish to enter, from Grandmasters to beginners.

The Championship's list of winners has included some of the world's strongest players, including Grandmasters Boris Spassky (in 1971, while he was World chess champion), Bent Larsen, Alexei Shirov, Vassily Ivanchuk, Viktor Bologan, Artur Yusupov, Bu Xiangzhi, Alexander Moiseenko, Kevin Spraggett, Ljubomir Ljubojević, Larry Evans, Pal Benko, William Lombardy, Gyula Sax, Igor Vasilyevich Ivanov, Walter Browne, Tony Miles, Larry Christiansen, Joel Benjamin, Eduardas Rozentalis, Vladimir Tukmakov, Jonathan Rowson, Luke McShane, Vladimir Epishin, Vladimir Malaniuk, Pentala Harikrishna, Alexander Shabalov, Nigel Short, Eric Hansen, and many other top stars.

The first tournament in Montreal 1956 was noteworthy for the presence of 13-year-old Bobby Fischer, a future World chess champion, who tied for 8-12th places. Montreal 1974 saw the largest attendance to date, with 648 players. Ottawa 2007 set a tournament record with 22 Grandmasters participating. Canadian Grandmaster Kevin Spraggett has the record for most titles with eight (either clear first or shared). Laszlo Witt made a perfect score (9-0) at Ottawa 1962; this was matched by Alexander Cherniev at Regina 2019. Mark Bluvshtein is the youngest champion, at age 17 at Edmonton in 2005. Daniel Yanofsky was the oldest champion, at age 54, also in Edmonton in 1979. Toronto has hosted the most Opens with ten, followed by Ottawa with seven and Edmonton with six.

The 2014 edition was held in Montreal from July 19–26. In 2015, no tournament was held. In 2018, the Open was held in Quebec City on July 6–13. In 2019, it was held in Regina, Saskatchewan, the first time ever in that province.

For both 2020 and 2021, the championship was cancelled due to the COVID-19 pandemic. The 2022 championship was held July 12–17 in Hamilton, Ontario. The 2023 championship was held in Calgary, July 22-30.

== List of winners and tournament sites ==
#	Year	City	Winner
1	1956	Montreal	Larry Evans, William Lombardy
2	1958	Winnipeg	Elod Macskasy
3	1960	Kitchener	Anthony Saidy
4	1962	Ottawa	Laszlo Witt
5	1964	Toronto	Pal Benko
6	1966	Kingston	Larry Evans
7	1968	Toronto	Bent Larsen
8	1970	St. John's	Bent Larsen
9	1971	Vancouver	Boris Spassky, Hans Ree
10	1973	Ottawa	Duncan Suttles
11	1974	Montreal	Ljubomir Ljubojević
12	1975	Calgary	Leonid Shamkovich
13	1976	Toronto	Nick de Firmian, Lawrence Day
14	1977	Fredericton	Jan Green-Krotki
15	1978	Hamilton	Gyula Sax
16	1979	Edmonton	Daniel Yanofsky
17	1980	Ottawa	Lawrence Day
18	1981	Beauport	Igor Vasilyevich Ivanov
19	1982	Vancouver	Gordon Taylor
20	1983	Toronto	Kevin Spraggett, Božidar Ivanović
21	1984	Ottawa	Igor Vasilyevich Ivanov, Dave Ross, Brett Campbell, Denis Allan
22	1985	Edmonton	Igor Vasilyevich Ivanov, Brian Hartman
23	1986	Winnipeg	Artur Yusupov, Viktor Kupreichik
24	1987	Toronto	Kevin Spraggett
25	1988	Toronto	Lawrence Day
26	1989	Edmonton	Vladimir Tukmakov
27	1990	Edmundston	Georgi Timoshenko
28	1991	Windsor	Walter Browne
29	1992	Toronto	Alexei Barsov, Bryon Nickoloff
30	1993	London	Kevin Spraggett
31	1994	Winnipeg	Vladimir Tukmakov
32	1995	Toronto	Kevin Spraggett, Eduardas Rozentalis, Deen Hergott, Bryon Nickoloff, Ron Livshits
33	1996	Calgary	Kevin Spraggett
34	1997	Winnipeg	Julian Hodgson
35	1998	Ottawa	Kevin Spraggett, Dimitri Tyomkin, Michael Oratovsky, Evgeny Prokopchuk
36	1999	Vancouver	Kevin Spraggett, Georgi Orlov
37	2000	Edmonton	Joel Benjamin, Kevin Spraggett, Jonathan Rowson
38	2001	Sackville	Tony Miles, Larry Christiansen
39	2002	Montreal	Pascal Charbonneau, Jean Hébert, Jean-Marc Degraeve
40	2003	Kapuskasing	Alexander Moiseenko
41	2004	Kapuskasing	Alexander Moiseenko, Dimitri Tyomkin
42	2005	Edmonton	Vassily Ivanchuk, Alexei Shirov, Viktor Bologan, Mark Bluvshtein, Saptarshi Roy Chowdhury
43	2006	Kitchener	Walter Arencibia, Abhijit Kunte
44	2007	Ottawa	Bu Xiangzhi
45	2008	Montreal	Alexander Moiseenko, Victor Mikhalevski, Eduardas Rozentalis, Matthieu Cornette
46	2009	Edmonton	Mark Bluvshtein, Edward Porper
47	2010	Toronto	Luke McShane
48	2011	Toronto	Walter Arencibia, Joel Benjamin, Dejan Bojkov
49	2012	Victoria	Eric Hansen
50	2013	Ottawa	Nigel Short, Eric Hansen
51	2014	Montreal	Sergei Tiviakov (on Armageddon tiebreak, ahead of Robin van Kampen and Ehsan Ghaem-Maghami)
52	2016	Windsor	Gergely Antal
53	2017	Sault Ste. Marie	Razvan Preotu, Aman Hambleton
54	2018	Quebec City	Bitan Banerjee (on tiebreak, ahead of Raymond Kaufman)
55	2019	Regina	Alexander Cherniaev
56	2022	Hamilton	Nikolay Noritsyn, Shawn Rodrigue-Lemieux
57	2023	Calgary	Alexei Shirov
58	2024	Laval	Jorden van Foreest
59	2025	Surrey	FM Ryan Yang (Vancouver), Shawn Rodrigue-Lemieux, FM Tymur Keleberda (Edmonton) and FM Stephen Willy (Washington State). All scored 7/9.

== See also ==
- Canadian Chess Championship
