= Norman Lessing =

American dramatist

- Born: Norman Lessing; June 24, 1911; New York, New York, U.S.
- Died: October 22, 2001 (aged 90); Santa Monica, California, U.S.
- Occupations: Academic, screenwriter, producer, playwright

Norman Lessing (June 24, 1911 – October 22, 2001) was an American television screenwriter and producer, playwright, chess master, and chess writer.

== Biography ==
Lessing grew up in New York City, and played a great deal of chess as a youth, reaching national master strength. He was New York State co-champion at age 19 in 1930 at Utica with 6½/8. He often played at the Stuyvesant Chess Club, on the lower east side of Manhattan. He won the 1967 Santa Monica Chess Club championship, and the 1967 United States Senior Open, at which time he had a rating of 2207. He was the Senior champion at the American and National Opens several times in the 1960s.

Lessing wrote actively for television from its pioneering days in 1950 in New York, and moved to California to continue his career until 1979. Shows he wrote screenplays for include Hawaii Five-O, The Fugitive, Lost in Space, Bonanza, The Nurses, The F.B.I., Baretta, Cannon, Dragnet, Eight is Enough, Shirley Temple's Storybook, The Adventures of Ellery Queen, and The Man from U.N.C.L.E..

He also wrote the play 36, which was performed all over the United States.

Lessing, along with International Master Anthony Saidy, wrote the book The World of Chess, published in 1974 by Random House. This book, which has been called among the best coffee-table chess books, features many photos of top chess players throughout history, photos of many exotic chess sets, plenty of lore and stories, and chapters from each writer about their chess experiences.

He died at age 90, of congestive heart failure and complications from Parkinson's disease. At the time of his death, Lessing was working on a book about his chess experiences, to be titled The Stuyvesant Chess Club. He was remembered thus in the United States Chess Federation's news summary: "Norman Lessing was the last link to the Golden Age of Coffeehouse Chess."
