= Lawrence Day =

Canadian chess player (born 1949)

Personal information
- Born: Lawrence Alexander Day; 1 February 1949 (age 77) Kitchener, Ontario, Canada
- Spouse: Angela Day (divorced)

Chess career
- Country: Canada
- Title: International Master (1972)
- FIDE rating: 2214 (May 2015)
- Peak rating: 2367 (October 2000)

Lawrence Alexander Day (born 1 February 1949 in Kitchener, Ontario) is a Canadian chess player, author, and journalist who holds the FIDE title of International Master. He represented Canada at 13 Chess Olympiads.

== Early life ==
As a youth in Ottawa, Day came under the influence of Fedor Bohatirchuk, a strong Ukrainian International Master and doctor, who had emigrated to Canada after the Second World War. Day's progress was rapid, and he qualified through the 1966 Open Canadian Chess Championship at Kingston, to represent Canada at the 1967 Junior World Chess Championship at Jerusalem, where he qualified for the 'A' final group. The highly experienced Bohatirchuk, who had a 3–0 score against Mikhail Botvinnik (later World Champion) exerted a very strong influence on Day's playing style.

Day first played for Canada in the Chess Olympiad in 1968 on the first reserve board (+3,=1,-8) at Lugano, his first of 13 appearances, which is a Canadian record. Day played board three for Canada (scoring +7,=1,-2) on the bronze medal team at the World Students' Chess Olympiad, Mayagüez 1971. He graduated from Carleton University in 1972 with a degree in English Literature, worked for the magazine Chess Canada for a time, and then became a professional player. He earned his International Master title at the Zonal Canadian Chess Championship, Toronto 1972.

== Canadian stalwart ==
He has been winning tournaments in Canada and North America since the late-1960s. He won the 1969 U.S. Junior Open. His biggest paycheck was for topping the field at the 1980 World Open. Day won three Canadian Open Chess Championships (1976, 1980, 1988). He won the Quebec Open Chess Championship three times (1974, 1975, 1979). He won the 1991 Closed Canadian Chess Championship. He tied for first place at the 1999 North Bay International Open, the last of that series of six annual excellent tournaments held there. So far he has won the Toronto City Championship Cup five times (1977, 1980, 1983, 1984, 1995). Day has won several dozen weekend Swiss format tournaments in Ontario since the late 1960s.

Day's Olympiad appearances for Canada have spanned 30 years, from 1968 to 1998, according to the comprehensive Olympiad site olimpbase.org. In his later years, during the 1990s, he several times volunteered at the last minute to fill in for players who were unable to go because of unforeseen circumstances. Day played at Skopje 1972 as second reserve (+2,=5,-3); Nice 1974 as first reserve (+5,=5,-1); Haifa 1976 as second board (+2,=6,-2); Buenos Aires 1978 as third board (+6,=3,-2); La Valletta 1980 as second board (+5,=4,-2); Lucerne 1982 as fourth board (+5,=2,-5); Thessaloniki 1984 as third board (+3,=5,-2); Dubai 1986 as third board (+8,=0,-3), winning the bronze medal; Manila 1992 as first reserve (+0,=2,-4); Moscow 1994 as fourth board (+3,=3,-3); Yerevan 1996 as first reserve (+6,=3,-2); and finally at Elista 1998 as first reserve (+3,=0,-4). His totals for Canada in Olympiad play are: +51,=39,-41, in a total of 131 games, which is the second most by a Canadian, behind only Daniel Yanofsky's 141. Canada made its best Olympiad results so far in 1976 with eighth place, eleventh place in 1978, and ninth place in 1980, and Day was a strong contributor all three times.

Day was never the undisputed top player in Canada, but he was among the top ten Canadian players for over 30 years, from the late-1960s into the late-1990s. His peak years were in the period 1978–1982, after which he was eclipsed by Grandmasters Igor V. Ivanov and Kevin Spraggett. Day survived a bout with cancer in 1975. He served as the non-playing captain of the Canadian team for the 2006 Turin Olympiad. He was granted an Honorary GM title by the Commonwealth Chess Association in 2006.

== Playing style and writings ==
In his youth, Day often stuck close to theoretical opening lines, but as his style matured, he ventured into uncharted territory more frequently. His style is an eclectic blend of main line theory and offbeat systems, which makes him very difficult to prepare for. Somewhat unusual for a top player, he would sometimes use the mercurial King's Gambit. One line he picked up from Bohatirchuk was the Chigorin Variation against the French Defence (1.e4 e6 2.Qe2), and he played this with success. During his peak years, his use of the Modern Defence placed him near the leading edge of world research there; he developed the Pterodactyl Variation and used it with success against strong players. Other favorite lines were the Closed Variation of the Sicilian Defence, the Grand Prix Attack against the Sicilian, and the Old Indian Defence.

Day was the Games Editor for Chess Canada Magazine and wrote the tournament book for the 1972 Closed Canadian Championship. He wrote a booklet on The Big Clamp opening system and co-authored a 1982 book on the Grand Prix Sicilian line with English Grandmaster Julian Hodgson. He wrote a book about the life and games of the late Canadian International Master Bryon Nickoloff (1956–2004), a close friend, published in 2007 by Chess'n Math Association. He is constantly updating his own selection of games, for eventual publication.

Day was chess columnist for the Toronto Star from 1976 to 2013.

Since the late 1960s, he has contributed to Canadian chess publications.

== Notable chess games ==
- Lodewijk Prins vs Lawrence Day, Lugano Olympiad 1968, Sicilian Defence, O'Kelly / Maroczy Variation (B40), 0-1 A highly unusual tactical game sees the young Day grab the initiative early on against the veteran GM, and then drive his King down the board into a forced discovered checkmate. Prins resigned before Day could execute the mate.
- Lawrence Day vs Duncan Suttles, Canadian Zonal Championship, Pointe Claire 1969, Modern Defence (A41), 1-0 Day and Suttles are both Modern Defence gurus, so this game is a clinic for the aspiring student.
- Kevin Spraggett vs Lawrence Day, Toronto Labour Day Open 1977, Modern / Sicilian Defence, Pterodactyl Variation (B27), 0-1 Day kept a solid edge in head-to-head games against Spraggett into the early 1980s; this one is typical of their early rivalry.
- Lawrence Day vs Ivan Morovic Fernandez, Buenos Aires Olympiad 1978, King's Gambit, Fischer Defence (C34), 1-0 Day developed many new ideas in the King's Gambit, and here he shows one of them to the Chilean GM.
- Kevin Spraggett vs Lawrence Day, Toronto Open 1980, Ruy Lopez, Closed / Smyslov Variation (C91), 0-1 In a patient strategical battle, Day fights hard to come out on top against stout resistance.
- Lawrence Day vs Pal Benko, Continental Open 1980, Sicilian Defence, Grand Prix Attack (B21), 1-0 Day co-authored a book on this line, and here he uses it beautifully to defeat a two-time World title Candidate.
- Jonathan Mestel vs Lawrence Day, Lucerne Olympiad 1982, Modern Defence, Pterodactyl Variation (B06), 0-1 Another Pterodactyl drags the English GM into a mire of dire complexities.
- Igor V. Ivanov vs Lawrence Day, Grand Manan 1984, Old Indian Defence (A55), 0-1 Ivanov was Canada's new star after defecting from the talent-rich USSR, but here he finds out that Canada has some chess talent too.
- Ron Livshits vs Lawrence Day, Canadian Zonal Championship, Kingston 1992, Owen's Defence (B00), 0-1 Day uncorks the unusual Owen's and takes on huge defensive responsibility. The young Livshits sacrifices several pawns, and seems ready to break through, but he eventually overreaches, and has to concede defeat.
- Lawrence Day vs Ognjen Cvitan, Moscow Olympiad 1994, Sicilian Defence, Closed Variation (B25), 1-0 Day is one of the world's great exponents of the Closed Sicilian, and here he takes off a much stronger and younger GM.
- Lawrence Day vs Dmitry Tyomkin, Ontario Open, Brantford 2004, Sicilian Defence, Closed Variation (B23), 1-0 Another clinic in the Closed Sicilian shows the young GM that Day, although getting older, still packs a pretty mean punch.

== Personal life ==
He was married to Canadian chess player Angela Day.
