= Igor Ivanov (chess player) =

Canadian chess grandmaster (1947–2005)

Personal information
- Born: Igor Vasilyevich Ivanov; January 8, 1947 Leningrad, RSFSR, USSR
- Died: November 17, 2005 (aged 58) St. George, Utah, U.S.

Chess career
- Country: Soviet Union (before 1980); Canada (1980–1991); United States (after 1991)
- Title: Grandmaster (2005)
- Peak rating: 2550 (January 1984)
- Peak ranking: No. 33 (January 1984)

Igor Vasilyevich Ivanov (Russian: Игорь Васильевич Иванов; January 8, 1947 – November 17, 2005) was a Russian-born chess grandmaster who defected from the Soviet Union to Canada in 1980. A four-time winner of the Canadian chess championship, he represented Canada at an interzonal tournament for the world chess championship and was a Canadian team member at two Chess Olympiads. He also was a nine-time US Grand Prix chess champion.

== Early life ==
Born in 1947 in Leningrad, Ivanov learned chess at age five. He studied music intensively as a youth, specializing in piano and cello, and was very talented. He was orphaned at age 14 when his mother died; she had wanted him to become a concert performer. He essentially gave up this path (although he remained an accomplished pianist) to concentrate on chess. Ivanov studied mathematics at Leningrad State University, but left before completing his degree. He was a member of the Army Sports Club, for which he trained chess players, and also played extensively. For several years in the early to mid-1970s, he was part of the exceptionally deep class of Soviet masters which was just below the international standard. Ivanov did qualify for the 1975 Soviet Championship First League; this event, with several grandmasters in the field, was still one stage below the top level at that time.

Ivanov took an opportunity to represent Uzbekistan, a central Asian Soviet republic, and to be a professional player there. Several victories in strong Soviet events soon followed, such as Vladivostok 1978, Yaroslavl 1979, and Ashkhabad 1979. He tied for first place with the 15-year-old prodigy, Garry Kasparov, at the 64-player Soviet Championship Otborochnii (qualifying tournament) held at Daugavpils, Latvia, in 1978. However, although their individual game was drawn (which Kasparov later annotated in his book, The Test of Time), Kasparov, on tiebreak, was the sole qualifier for the elite Soviet Championship Premier League. Ivanov had to settle again for the First League. Thus, despite being a very strong master, Ivanov never had the opportunity before 1980 to participate in tournaments where he could earn international master or grandmaster norms.

Ivanov first became known internationally later in 1979, when he upset World Champion Anatoly Karpov in a superb game at the Spartakiad of the Peoples of the USSR team tournament. The win caught the attention of Soviet authorities, earning him the coveted privilege of travel outside the Soviet Union to play in a tournament in Cuba. However, Ivanov, who by this point was listening to Western radio broadcasts such as Radio Liberty, was instead determined to defect.

== Defection to Canada ==
In 1980, Ivanov came into the international spotlight again when, during the return trip from Cuba, he defected to Canada. He had been sent as a member of the Soviet delegation to play at the Capablanca Memorial tournament in Cienfuegos. On what was supposed to have been a direct flight home to Moscow, the airplane, a Czechoslovak airliner, had to make an emergency stop to refuel in Gander, Newfoundland. Ivanov, seizing his chance, ran from the plane with only his pocket chess set while chased by his KGB handler. He was granted political asylum.

His defection came at a steep personal and professional cost. He was ghosted in the Soviet Union, and his relationships with his former compatriots became very distanced; only former world champion Boris Spassky would speak to him in public. Ivanov also apparently left behind two women who had had children by him, as well as a wife and child in Leningrad.

== New Canadian star ==
He arrived in Montreal. At this stage, Ivanov was untitled and rated 2430, but soon proved he was much stronger. His first significant tournament win in Canada was the 1980 Quebec Open Championship in Montreal, where he made an undefeated 7/8, to finish half a point ahead of Kevin Spraggett, whom he defeated in their head-to-head game. Spraggett later said that Ivanov was playing some of the best tournament chess in the world during this period.

Ivanov won the 1981 Zonal Canadian Chess Championship also held there, earning the International Master title, and qualified for the World Championship cycle the next year. He went on to win the Championship of Canada four times in all, including three straight years from 1985-1987. He won the Canadian Open Chess Championship three times, in 1981, 1984, and 1985. For the 1981 World Championship match in Merano, he was a second for the challenger, Viktor Korchnoi.

At the 1982 Toluca Interzonal, Ivanov narrowly missed a grandmaster norm as well as advancing as a Candidate, finishing in a 4th-place tie with Lev Polugaevsky, Artur Yusupov, and Yasser Seirawan. Later that year, he represented Canada on top board at the Lucerne Chess Olympiad, where he defeated Jan Timman and Tony Miles. He also played for Canada in the 1988 Chess Olympiad in Thessaloniki.

Although he was clearly a player of grandmaster strength, Ivanov did not actually receive the title until the last year of his life, 2005. The delay was caused mainly by Ivanov's disdain for the paper trail involved in reporting the GM norms achieved in the 1990s. "Let it be," he said. "After all, I'm the strongest master in the world!"

== Years of travel ==
Ivanov moved in the 1980s to the United States (although he continued to visit Canada), where he participated in the Grand Prix tournaments (also known as the "Church's Chicken Circuit") to earn a living. He traveled around the US mostly by bus, playing in small and medium-sized tournaments nearly every weekend, which he very often won, as well as many major American events. He won nine first prizes, worth $10,000 each, for most Grand Prix points in a year, and was one of the most active players in the country.

The grueling years of travel and Swiss tournaments took their toll. Ivanov's consumption of alcohol, which had always been heavy, grew increasingly out of control; there were reports of him playing at the US Chess Championship while intoxicated.

Ivanov tied for first place in the 1985 U.S. Masters Chess Championship.

In 1991, he moved to Utah, where he resided with his American wife Elizabeth, a retired teacher who was at one time a distinguished chess player herself. Ivanov won the Utah Open and Utah Championship titles whenever he competed, and personally trained many of Utah's top chess players including the prodigy, Kayden William Troff.

== Illness and death ==
Ivanov was diagnosed with cancer in March 2005. The Professional Players' Health and Benefit Fund of the United States Chess Federation gave him financial support for his chemotherapy treatments.

In August 2005, three months before his death, he tied for eighth place at the U.S. Open Chess Championship in Phoenix, Arizona.

He played at the Utah Open on October 29, 2005, finishing in a tie for first place.

Igor Ivanov died on November 17, 2005.

== Notable chess games ==
- Igor Ivanov vs Vladimir Bagirov, USSR Championship Qualifying tournament, Cheliabinsk 1975, Queen's Gambit Declined (D30), 1–0 In a sharp tactical battle, Ivanov shows his talent by defeating an experienced grandmaster.
- Igor Ivanov vs Anatoly Karpov, USSR Spartakiade 1979, Sicilian Defense, Kan Variation (B43), 1–0 Ivanov captured the attention of the chess world in this sharp game where the World Champion is defeated by near-perfect play.
- Kevin Spraggett vs Igor Ivanov, Quebec Open, Montreal 1980, Nimzo-Indian Defence, Rubinstein Variation (E41), 0–1 After defecting, Ivanov is the new guy in Montreal, and makes his presence felt immediately with a win over one of Canada's top players.
- Igor Ivanov vs Eugenio Torre, Toluca Interzonal 1982, Queen's Gambit Declined, Slav Defence (D14), 1–0 Far from being overawed in such lofty company, Ivanov makes a very strong bid to advance as a world championship candidate, defeating one of the players who would, in fact, play in that candidates' cycle.
- Igor Ivanov vs Jan Timman, Lucerne Olympiad 1982, English Opening, Symmetrical Variation (A35), 1–0 Ivanov takes down one of the West's top players in a positional squeeze.
- Igor Ivanov vs Anthony Miles, Lucerne Olympiad 1982, English Opening, Symmetrical Variation (A30), 1–0 England's top player has to concede defeat after being outmaneuvered, as Ivanov invests in a very deep pawn sacrifice to break Black's coordination, then follows up by sacrificing a bishop for a glorious conclusion.
- Maxim Dlugy vs Igor Ivanov, Las Vegas 1994, Modern Defence, Averbakh Variation (A42), 0–1 Ivanov makes fairly quick work of another Soviet emigre GM.
- Pavel Blatny vs Igor Ivanov, U.S. Open, Reno 1999, Reti Opening (A05), 0–1 A quiet struggle gradually intensifies into a tactical battle where Ivanov sees further.
