= Chess'n Math Association =

Canadian chess organization

The Chess'n Math Association (or Chess and Math Association) is a non-profit organization dedicated to bringing chess into Canadian schools. Founded in 1985 by Larry Bevand, who still serves as its executive director, it is "Canada's National Scholastic Chess Organization". Chess'n Math runs hundreds of tournaments for kids K-12 across Canada, including an annual Canadian Chess Challenge. These tournaments are rated according to its own scholastic rating system. It also offers chess lessons and camps, and runs the Strategy game stores located in Montreal and Toronto. CMA has sponsored several chess futurity events, to provide international title norm opportunities for promising young Canadian players.

== Publications ==
- Leçons d'échecs du Tournoi International de Montréal 2001 by IM Jean Hébert
- Le Livre du Tournoi International de Montréal 2002 by IM Jean Hébert
- Murir son style aux échecs Jeremy Silman
- Murir son style aux échecs par example Jeremy Silman
- Le cerveau de l'amateur mis a nu Jeremy Silman
- Maitriser les finales aux échecs Jeremy Silman
- Nick's Best by IM Lawrence Day about IM Bryon Nickoloff
- Chess on the Edge by GM Yasser Seirawan and FM Bruce Harper, the games of GM Duncan Suttles in three volumes.

== Rating System ==
The Chess 'n Math rating system does not differ from that of the FIDE a lot in the way that the formula is derived, but the variables are different. According to their website, the formula is as follows, for one tournament or multi-game event:

$R_n = R_o + (W-L) \times 16 + D * 0.04\$

Where W is the number of wins, L is the number of losses, and D is the difference in rating (your opponent's minus yours), with a cutoff value of ±350.

As it appears, the number of "expected wins" for one game is equal to the difference in rating divided by 800, plus 0.5. The cutoff value of ±350 makes the limits of these "We" values, 15/16 and 1/16 respectively. A person can also win bonus points equal to:

$Bonus = (R_n - R_o - (18 + 2 \times G));\ \ \ min(Bonus)=0$

for doing extremely well in a series of games. (G stands for number of games played).

As of September 1, 2007, a "bonus" of 2 is added to every game won, up to a maximum of 50 games.
