= Kevin Spraggett =

Canadian chess grandmaster (born 1954)

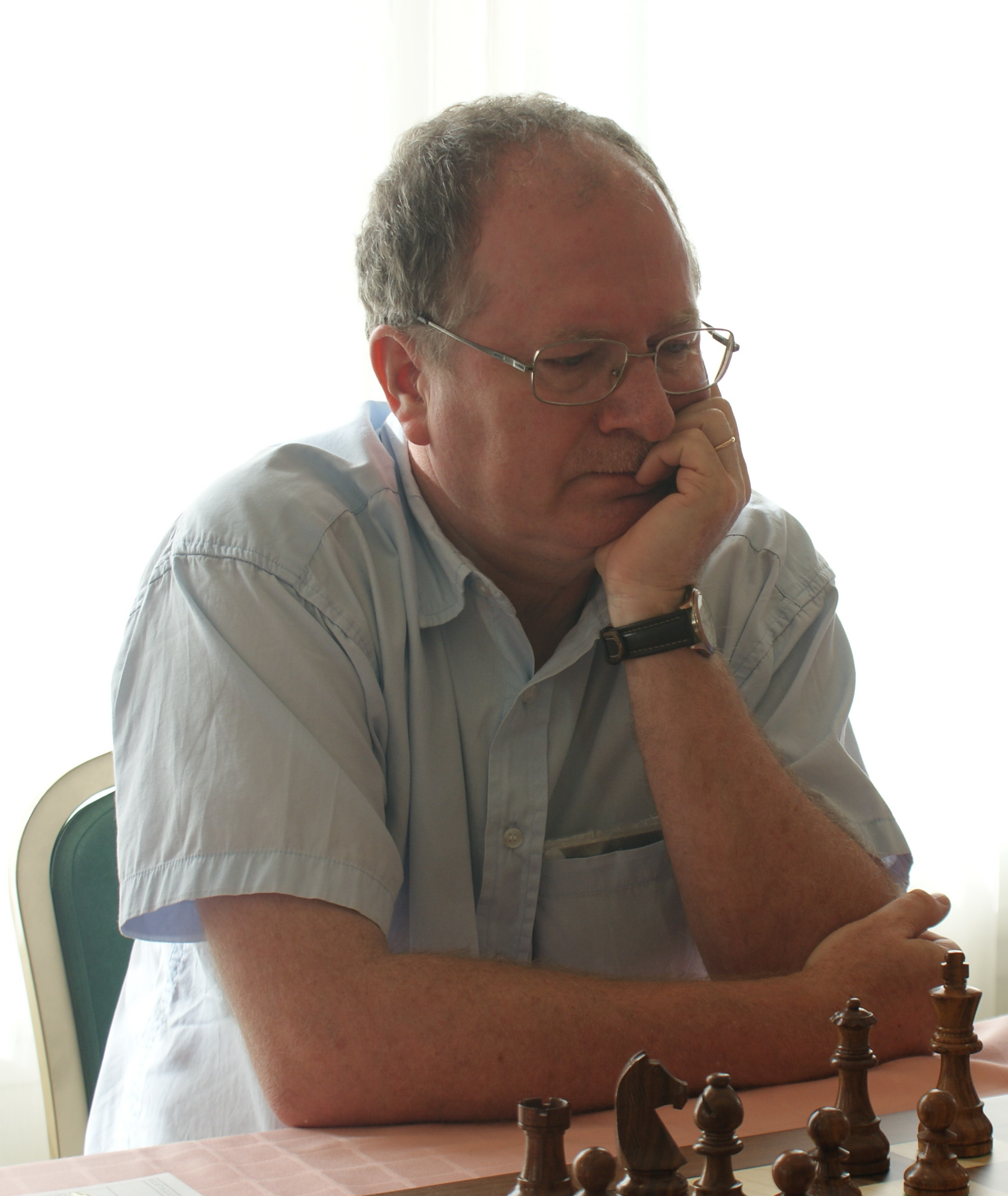
- Spraggett in 2010

Personal information
- Born: Kevin Berry Spraggett; 10 November 1954 (age 72) Montreal, Quebec, Canada

Chess career
- Country: Canada
- Title: Grandmaster (1985)
- Peak rating: 2633 (January 2007)
- Peak ranking: No. 25 (July 1989)

Kevin Spraggett (born November 10, 1954, in Montreal) is a Canadian chess grandmaster. He was the first Canadian-born player and fourth Canadian overall to earn the grandmaster title, after Abe Yanofsky, Duncan Suttles and Peter Biyiasas.

Spraggett is the only Canadian ever to have qualified for the world championship Candidates Tournament, having done so in 1985 and 1988. He has won a total of eight Canadian Open Chess Championships, seven Closed Canadian Chess Championships, and has represented Canada eight times in Olympiad play. Spraggett has also written for Canadian chess publications and published a chess blog.

Spraggett is widely considered to be the strongest Canadian-born player in chess history. His FIDE rating peaked at 2633 in January 2007, at age 52. In the late 1980s, he ranked consistently amongst the top 100 players in the world.

== Chess career ==
Spraggett was raised in Montreal. One of seven children, his father taught him the rules when he was about seven, but he did not begin to take the game seriously until he was 14. Spraggett tied for first in the 1973 Junior Canadian Chess Championship, but lost the playoff match to John MacPhail. One of his key early tournament victories came in the 1974 Montreal Championship, where he scored 5½/6. He had reached national master strength by this time, just before his twentieth birthday. He attended McGill University, studying engineering; however, he left before completing his degree, in favour of becoming a chess professional. Spraggett spent his early years developing his game in Canadian and American Swiss system open events, where the prizes were often low. His younger brother Grant is also a strong player, having earned the FIDE Master title.

He was awarded the International Master title in 1975, following a second-place finish at the Zonal Canadian Chess Championship in Calgary; Peter Biyiasas won. Spraggett raised his game to meet the challenge of Igor Ivanov, who had settled in Montreal in the early 1980s after defecting from the Soviet Union. Those years saw Spraggett attain success in several strong tournaments, with victories in the 1983 World Open, 1984 Commonwealth Championship, 1984 New York Open, and 1985 Commonwealth Championship. However, he did not play in an international grandmaster round-robin tournament until Wijk aan Zee in 1985, just after his thirtieth birthday, at which time he was the highest-rated International Master in the world.

Spraggett won his first of seven Canadian titles in 1984, which qualified him for the Taxco Interzonal the next year. His fourth-place result at Taxco 1985, where he topped many more famous players, earned him the Grandmaster title, and seeded him to the Candidates Tournament. He came in last at the Montpellier Candidates in 1985, but qualified again for the next Candidates. In his first-round match at Saint John, 1988, Spraggett defeated world no. 3 Andrei Sokolov in a blitz playoff. He then lost to Artur Yusupov in extra games in the 1989 Candidates' quarterfinal round at Quebec City.

Spraggett has been a Canadian team member at eight Chess Olympiads (including a silver medal performance in 2000), has won the Canadian closed and open championships fifteen times, and has a host of tournament victories in Europe.

Spraggett has resided in Portugal since the late 1980s, and plays most of his tournaments in Europe, although he visits North America every year or two on average. Among notable finishes in the 2000s was his victory at the Figueira da Foz International Chess Festival (2008, with 7½/9) and a clear second place at the Calvià Open (2007, with 7/9).

== Highlights ==
- World Open Champion 1983
- New York Open Champion 1984
- Commonwealth Champion 1984 (Hong Kong) and 1985 (London)
- Seven Closed Canadian Chess Championship titles (1984, 1986, 1989, 1994, 1996, 2001, 2002)
- Eight Canadian Open Chess Championship titles (1983, 1987, 1993, 1995, 1996, 1998, 1999, 2000)
- Tied first place Canadian Junior Championship 1973-4
- Canadian Closed Blitz Champion 1996
- Represented Canada at World Championship Interzonals (1985, Taxco, and 1990, Manila)
- Represented Canada at World Championship Candidates' tournament 1985, Montpellier
- Represented Canada at World Championship Candidates' matches (1988, 1989); he beat Andrei Sokolov (+2 –1 =9) in 1988 at Saint John, but was then eliminated by Artur Yusupov (+1 –2 =6) in 1989 at Quebec City
- Represented Canada at World Championship Knockout (1997, 1999)
- Represented Canada at Chess Olympiads (1986, 1990, 1992, 1994, 1996, 1998, 2000, 2002)
- Silver medal, Board 2, Olympiad 2000, Istanbul
- Top rated Canadian at year-end 23 times (1980, 1982–90, 1992–2000, 2002-5)
- Canadian Chess Hall of Fame 2000
- Columnist for Chess Canada magazine 2006.

== Notable chess games ==
- Abe Yanofsky vs Kevin Spraggett, Canadian Zonal, Calgary 1975, Sicilian Defence, Taimanov Variation (B46), 0-1 A subtle positional grind to defeat the eight-time Canadian champion.
- Lev Alburt vs Kevin Spraggett, Atlantic Open, Washington 1979, English Opening (A16), 0-1 Exceptionally complex and hard-fought game sees Spraggett eventually come out on top following a deep exchange sacrifice.
- Kevin Spraggett vs Lev Alburt, New York Open 1984, Alekhine's Defence (B04), 1-0 Ex-Soviet GM gets beaten up quite badly in his favourite defence; Spraggett goes on to win the tournament.
- Kevin Spraggett vs Robert Fradet, Simultaneous Exhibition, Sherbrooke 1984 Astonishing sacrifices by the unknown Robert Fradet who forces the draw; surprised at that performance, Spraggett refuses to rematch.
- Lajos Portisch vs Kevin Spraggett, Wijk aan Zee 1985, Queen's Gambit Accepted (D20), 0-1 A complicated positional battle eventually sees the veteran Hungarian GM conceding an upset defeat.
- Kevin Spraggett vs Jonathan Speelman, Taxco Interzonal 1985, Queen's Indian Defence (E12), 1-0 Spraggett shows he will be a contender to qualify with this tactical win over one of England's best.
- Jan Timman vs Kevin Spraggett, Montpellier Candidates' 1985, Queen's Pawn Game, Keres Defence (A40), 0-1 A bizarre opening sees Spraggett sacrifice a piece on move nine, and the Dutch GM struggles to find his bearings for the rest of the game.
- Kevin Spraggett vs Boris Spassky, Montpellier Candidates' 1985, English Opening (A31), 1-0 A former world champion can't handle Spraggett's patient strategical buildup, which explodes into a virulent attack as the time control approaches.
- Kevin Spraggett vs Andrei Sokolov, Saint John Candidates' match, game 5, 1988, Sicilian Defence, Najdorf Variation (B97), 1-0 After a fashionable sharp opening, Sokolov, the world's #3-ranked player, can't hold the slightly inferior endgame in the face of Spraggett's precision.
- Kevin Spraggett vs Artur Yusupov, Quebec City Candidates' quarter-final, game 2, 1989, Reti Opening (A07) Spraggett maneuvers carefully before unleashing a nasty exchange sacrifice, which crowns his positional pressure.
- Kevin Spraggett vs Boris Gelfand, Moscow Olympiad 1994, Sicilian Defence, Closed Variation (B23), 1-0 A possible opening surprise puts Gelfand on the defensive, and Spraggett never lets up.
- Stellan Brynell vs Kevin Spraggett, Tarragona Open 2006, Queen's Indian Defence (E15), 0-1 A quiet opening leads into middlegame risks by Spraggett, culminating in a lovely finish.
- Kevin Spraggett vs Fred South, Eastern Ontario Open, 1976, Nimzowitsch Defense: Williams Variation (B00), 1-0 Spraggett sacrifices his queen on move five and goes on to win.
