= Interzonal chess tournaments =

International chess tournament

Interzonal chess tournaments were tournaments organized by the World Chess Federation FIDE from the 1950s to the 1990s. They were a stage in the triennial World Chess Championship cycle and were held after the Zonal tournaments, and before the Candidates Tournament. Since 2005, the Chess World Cup has filled a similar role.

== Zonal tournaments ==
In the first year of the cycle, every FIDE member nation would hold a national championship, with the top players qualifying for the Zonal tournament. The world was divided into distinct zones, with the Soviet Union, the United States and Canada each being designated a zone, thus qualifiers from these three zones went directly to the Interzonal. Smaller countries would be grouped into a zone with many countries. For example, all of South America and Central America combined originally formed one zone.

== Interzonal tournaments ==
The top players in each Zonal tournament would meet in the Interzonal tournament, which would typically have between 20 and 24 players. The top finishers (e.g., the top six in 1958) would qualify for the Candidates Tournament, which would take place the following year. They would be joined in the Candidates by the loser of the previous candidates' final and the loser of the previous world championship match. The winner of the Candidates tournament would play a 24-game match with the World Champion the following year, and need to win outright to gain the title.

For instance, in the World Chess Championship 1963 cycle, nine different Zonals were played. Each qualified between one and four players for the Interzonal, depending on the strength of the region, with 23 players qualifying for the Interzonal. The Interzonal was played in January to March 1962, with the top six players qualifying for the Candidates. They were joined by Mikhail Tal (loser of the 1961 match for the championship with Mikhail Botvinnik), and Paul Keres, who had finished second at the 1959 Candidates tournament. Those eight played a quadruple round-robin in the Candidates tournament in May and June 1962. The winner was Tigran Petrosian, who then played Botvinnik in a match for the championship in 1963.

Thus, Interzonal tournaments were held approximately every three years from 1948 until 1993 (1948, 1952, 1955, 1958, 1962, 1964, 1967, 1970, 1973, 1976, 1979, 1982, 1985, 1987, 1990, and 1993). In 1973 the system was changed to two Interzonals (with the first three in each qualifying for the Candidates), to allow more players to qualify from the Zonals. In 1982 it changed again to three Interzonal tournaments, where the top two players qualified from each. Further increases in the number of qualifiers led to the Interzonal being staged as a single Swiss system tournament in 1990 and 1993. The short-lived Professional Chess Association also held a Swiss system Interzonal in 1993.

== Chess World Cup ==
The system was dropped altogether from the mid-1990s, being replaced by a series of short, knockout-style matches among qualifiers. From 1998 to 2004, these tournaments were for the FIDE World Championship.

Since 2005, the Chess World Cup, which has the same format as these knockout tournaments, has filled a somewhat similar role to the Interzonal; with the top finishers qualifying for the Candidates. As with the Interzonals, players qualify via zonal tournaments, although some leading players are seeded directly into the World Cup. However, unlike the pre-1996 system, all cycles since 2012 have included other ways for players to qualify for the Candidates.

== See also ==
See Candidates Tournament for a table of Interzonal, Candidates and World Championship results since 1948.
