= Nemo Zhou =

Canadian chess player (born 2000)

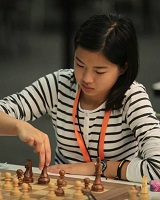
- Zhou at the 2014 World Youth Chess Championships in Durban, South Africa

Personal information
- Born: January 6, 2000 (age 26) Jingzhou, China

Chess career
- Country: Finland (until 2011); Canada (since 2011)
- Title: Woman Grandmaster (2017); FIDE Master (2016)
- FIDE rating: 2172 (September 2024)
- Peak rating: 2367 (September 2016)

Twitch information
- Channel: akaNemsko
- Years active: 2020–present
- Genre: Gaming
- Games: Chess; League of Legends
- Followers: 380 k

YouTube information
- Channel: Nemo
- Years active: 2020–present
- Subscribers: 747 k
- Views: 756.2 million
- Last updated: 09 October 2026

Qiyu Zhou (Chinese: 周齐宇; born January 6, 2000), also known as Nemo Zhou and her online alias akaNemsko, is a Canadian chess player who holds the titles of Woman Grandmaster (WGM) and FIDE Master (FM) and a live streamer on Twitch. She has been an under-14 girls' World Youth Champion, a Canadian women's national champion, and a Finnish women's national champion. Zhou has a peak FIDE rating of 2367 and a career-best ranking of No. 100 in the world among women. She is the first Canadian woman to earn the Woman Grandmaster or FIDE Master titles and has represented Canada at the Women's Chess Olympiad since 2014.

Zhou began playing chess in France at age three before growing up primarily in Finland and Canada. She gained national fame in Finland by becoming the youngest-ever Finnish national chess champion, winning the under-10 open division at just five years old. While playing for Finland, she also finished runner-up in the under-8 girls' division of the World Youth Chess Championships in 2008 at age eight and won the women's division of the Finnish Chess Championship in 2010 at age 10. Zhou switched federations to Canada in 2011. She became a Canadian girls' national chess champion at the under-12 and under-14 levels in 2012 and 2013 respectively, before winning the women's national championship in 2016. Her biggest triumph as a junior was winning the under-14 girls' division of the World Youth Chess Championships in 2014. Zhou qualified for the Woman Grandmaster title in 2016 with norms at three consecutive tournaments, two of which were in Kecskemét, Hungary, where she had also gained 300 rating points from two tournaments a year earlier. Her best victory in a game by rating was against Toms Kantāns, an International Master (IM) rated 2496 at the time they played.

Zhou started a Twitch channel, called akaNemsko, in 2020, streaming chess in collaboration with other Chess.com streamers and also streaming other games as a variety streamer. In August 2020, she signed with Counter Logic Gaming, the first chess player to sign with an esports organization.

== Early life and background ==
Qiyu Zhou was born on January 6, 2000, to Changrong Yu and Jiehan Zhou in Jingzhou, China. Her mother has a doctorate in English linguistics and her father has a doctorate in computer engineering. Zhou began playing chess at three years old while living in Antibes in France, where her father was working at the French Institute for Research in Computer Science and Automation. She first became interested in the game after seeing a chess set while walking down the street. She subsequently joined a chess club, where her proficiency at chess was recognized from her ability to defeat 10-year-old boys despite having only a month of experience of playing the game.

Zhou moved to Finland at the age of four when her father began working at the VTT Technical Research Centre of Finland and the University of Oulu. In Oulu, she joined the Shakki-77 chess club and was coached by Jouni Tolonen. Within a year, she became the youngest Finnish national chess champion in history by winning the under-10 open section of the Finnish Youth Chess Championships at five years old. This achievement was widely celebrated in the media in Finland and led to her story being published in a national textbook for elementary school students. In addition to repeating as under-10 open champion for four years from 2007 through 2010, Zhou won the Finnish Women's National Chess Championship in 2010 at the age of 10.

As the Finnish under-10 national champion, Zhou qualified to play in the World Youth Chess Championship on several occasions. She competed in the under-10 girls' division in 2005, scoring 4½/11 at age five. After switching to the new under-8 girls' division for her next two World Youth Championships, Zhou won a silver medal at the 2008 event, which was held in Vũng Tàu, Vietnam. With Kalle Kiik as her team's coach at the competition, she scored 8½/11, second behind only Zhansaya Abdumalik who finished with 10/11. At Zhou's first World Youth Championship, she also had the opportunity to meet leading women's chess player Hou Yifan, who she has long considered to be her biggest chess role model. When Zhou was around 11 years old, she and her family relocated to Ottawa, prompting her to switch federations from Finland to Canada in 2011.

== Chess career ==
=== 2011–15: Under-14 World Champion ===
Zhou earned her first FIDE rating after the 2010 World Youth Championship, starting at 1710 in January 2011 at the age of ten. Once in Canada, she had more opportunity to compete in tournaments with adults. With good performances at both the 2011 Montreal Open and the 2011 World Youth Championship that each resulted in her gaining 50 rating points, she finished the year at a rating of 1782. Zhou continued to rise in rating over the next several years, first crossing 1900 in July 2013 a month after a good performance at the Gatineau Open. She also became a Canadian youth national champion in back-to-back years, winning the girls' under-12 division in 2012 and the girls' under-14 division in 2013.

Zhou had a large rating jump of nearly 200 points in 2014. While rated 2029 in July, she scored 3½/4 at the Eastern Ontario Open against four opponents also between 2000 and 2100, earning a rating increase of 64 points. Towards the end of 2014, Zhou produced her best result of the year by winning the gold medal in the girls' under-14 division at the World Youth Championships in Durban, South Africa. She scored 8½/11 to finish in equal first with Oliwia Kiołbasa, the only other undefeated player in the division. They were also tied on the first tiebreak criterion, having drawn against each other in the tenth round. As such, Zhou clinched the gold medal on the second tiebreak criterion, which was a Buchholz score. Her highest rating during the year was 2157.

Zhou had multiple large rating jumps and drops in 2015. Following a rating drop of 90 points to close out 2014, Zhou immediately regained all of those rating points the following month at the Chess in Kecskemét New Year IM event in Hungary, where she scored 6/12 against opponents with an average rating of 2302. After losing 99 points at the Reykjavik Open, she regained 75 points at two events in Canada in May. In late May, Zhou won the girls' under-18 division at the North American Youth Chess Championships in Toluca, Mexico to earn the Woman International Master (WIM) title. After another large rating drop at the under-20 North American Female Championships, Zhou returned to Kecskemét for two more tournaments in August. She gained 300 points between both tournaments, including 174 at the latter. As a result, she rose to a rating of 2328, crossing both 2200 and 2300 for the first time.

=== 2016–present: WGM and FM titles ===
During 2016, Zhou was awarded the FIDE Master (FM) title and also qualified for the Woman Grandmaster (WGM), the latter of which was not approved until the following year. She was the first Canadian woman to earn either of those titles. At the Stockholm Chess Challenge in March, she won her last-round game against Toms Kantāns, who was then an International Master (IM) rated 2496 and is the highest-rated player she has defeated. Later in the year, Zhou earned all three norms for the WGM title in three successive tournaments beginning in July. The first and third events were both in Kecskemét where she had also done well the previous year. She scored 7½/10 in the Chess in Kecskemét July IM tournament and then 7/10 in the Chess in Kecskemét July GM tournament. In-between, she travelled to Novi Sad in Serbia and had her best performance among these three events, scoring 7/9 at the IM Riblje Ostrvo 3 tournament, a ½ point more than what was needed for the norm. With these three results, Zhou climbed to a career-best rating of 2367. She also became one of the top 100 women in the world by ranking and one of the top 10 girls for the first and only time in her career, ranking at exactly No. 100 among women and at exactly No. 10 among girls. (Note: The girls ranking list consists of players under 21 years old.) Zhou's last big result of the year was winning the Canadian Women's Championship by a point, a victory that qualified her to compete at the Women's World Chess Championship the following year.

From 2017 onwards, Zhou began competing at fewer chess tournaments in part to focus on her studies at university. She entered the 2017 Women's World Chess Championship knockout event as the 54th seed among 64 competitors. She faced 11th seed Natalia Pogonina in the first round, and was eliminated in the two-game match 1½ to ½ after drawing the first game with black but losing the second game with white. At the end of the year, Zhou was unable to defend her Canadian women's national championship, losing by a ½ point to Maili-Jade Ouellet. After more than a year-long hiatus from competitive chess due to the COVID-19 pandemic, Zhou returned to chess in May 2021 for the online Canadian World Cup qualifier tournament and won with a score of 7½/8 in a double round-robin format. As the 82nd seed out of 103 players at the World Cup, she was eliminated in the first round by 47th seed Vaishali Rameshbabu, losing both games of their match.

=== Teaching ===
Beyond playing chess, Zhou has written chess articles for ChessBase. Some of her articles feature her own statistical analysis of games. She has also released two instructional DVDs through ChessBase, one on tactics and the other on openings.

== Team competitions ==
=== International events ===
Zhou has represented Canada at international team competitions since 2014. She made her debut at the Women's Chess Olympiad in Tromsø in Norway, where she played on the fourth board behind Yuanling Yuan, Natalia Khoudgarian, and Alexandra Botez. She scored 6½/9 as Canada finished 41st out of 136 teams with a team score of 13 points (+6–4=1). Later in the year, Zhou also took part in the under-16 Chess Olympiad in Győr, Hungary. Playing on the reserve board, Zhou scored 2½/6 and lost 52 rating points. Her team finished in fifth place. At the 2016 Women's Chess Olympiad in Baku in Azerbaijan, Canada produced an identical score to rank 39th out of 139 teams. Zhou played on the top board ahead of Yuan, Botez, and Lali Agbabishvili, scoring 4½/10 and losing 60 rating points. Zhou's best Women's Chess Olympiad performance came in 2018 in Batumi, Georgia. Canada again produced an identical score to rank 38th out of 150 teams. Zhou played on the second board behind Agnieszka Matras-Clement and ahead of Ouellet and Svitlana Demchenko, scoring 7/10 and gaining 20 rating points.

=== Collegiate events ===
Zhou has been a member of the University of Toronto chess team. She represented the team at the Ivy League Challenge which her university hosted in 2018 and 2019 at the Hart House Chess Club. Each tournament consisted of six teams, two from the University of Toronto, and one each from four different universities in the United States. Zhou played on Team B in 2018 and Team A in 2019. She fared well at both tournaments, gaining rating points on both occasions. Her team won the 2019 event by winning all five of their matches, ahead of Princeton, the champions from the previous year.

== Playing style ==
Zhou has played more games with 1.e4 (the King's Pawn Game) than 1.d4 (the Queen's Pawn Game) or other first moves. She prefers to continue 1.e4 with the Spanish Opening (1.e4 e5 2.Nf3 Nc6 3.Bb5; also known as the Ruy Lopez). Zhou had originally started out playing the Scotch Opening (1.e4 e5 2.Nf3 Nc6 3.d4), before switching primarily to the Spanish Opening. She likes the variety of different lines with the Spanish Opening, and does not play with much variety beyond this opening.

== Streaming career ==
Zhou began streaming on the Twitch channel BotezLive with fellow Canadian chess players Alexandra and Andrea Botez in March 2020 before launching her own channel akaNemsko in June 2020. She also streams on Chess.com, and has continued to collaborate with the Botez sisters and other Chess.com streamers such as Hikaru Nakamura and Levy Rozman. She has also commentated on matches and coached participants in PogChamps, a series of tournaments run by Chess.com for popular non-chess streamers that began in 2020. Zhou accrued over 100,000 followers on Twitch within a year of her first streaming with the Botez sisters. The growth of her channel was part of a large increase in interest in online chess at the time related to the COVID-19 pandemic keeping people around the world at home, the PogChamps tournaments introducing chess to a broader streaming audience, and the popularity of The Queen's Gambit miniseries.

Zhou was the first chess streamer to sign a professional contract with a major esports organization, joining Counter Logic Gaming in August 2020. Many other leading chess streamers followed suit and signed with esports organizations later in the year, beginning with Nakamura about a week later. Zhou is a variety streamer, also playing games other than chess such as League of Legends.

== Personal life ==
Zhou attended Colonel By Secondary School and was a member of the RA Centre Chess Club. Starting in 2017, she pursued a bachelor's degree at the University of Toronto with a double major in economics and mathematics, and a minor in statistics. She went on leave from the university in January 2021 to focus on streaming full-time.

Zhou competed in pole vaulting in high school and other sports including basketball and badminton. She can speak English, Mandarin Chinese, Finnish and French.

Zhou was nicknamed Nemo by her parents when she was three years old due to her interest in aquariums, and drawing the name from the 2003 Disney animated film Finding Nemo. A high school friend modified it to Nemsko. She has stated she prefers using Nemo over her given name. She created her online name akaNemsko, where "aka" is short for the standard "also known as".

== Notable games ==
Zhou vs. Kantāns, Stockholm 2016

Position: a8 black rook, e8 black king, f8 black bishop, h8 black rook, b7 black bishop, c7 black queen, f7 black pawn, g7 black pawn, h7 black pawn, e6 black pawn, f6 black knight, a5 black knight, b5 white knight, d5 black pawn, e4 white pawn, a3 white pawn, e3 white bishop, f3 white pawn, b2 white pawn, c2 white pawn, e2 white bishop, g2 white pawn, h2 white pawn, a1 white rook, d1 white queen, f1 white rook, h1 white king

Position after 11. f3 d5 12. Ndxb5 axb5 13. Nxb5

Position: e8 black rook, g8 black king, f7 black pawn, g7 black pawn, h7 black pawn, c6 black bishop, d6 white rook, e6 black queen, a5 white pawn, c5 white queen, b4 white pawn, h4 black bishop, c3 white bishop, e3 black knight, b2 white rook, g2 white pawn, h2 white pawn, h1 white king

Position after 33. Qc5 Bc6 34. Bc3 Ne3 35. Rd6

- Qiyu Zhou (2247) – Toms Kantāns (2496), 2016 Stockholm Chess Challenge: Round 9; Sicilian defense, 1–0. Zhou analyzed the game with WIM Svetlana Agrest, a commentator for the event. Some of their discussion is included below.

1. e4 c5 2. Nf3 Nc6 3. d4 cxd4 4. Nxd4 e6 5. Nc3 Qc7 6. Be3 a6 7. Be2 b5 8. a3 Bb7 9. O-O Nf6 10. Kh1 Na5 11. f3 d5 (Agrest: "You found an interesting sacrifice [exchanging a knight for two pawns]") 12. Ndxb5 axb5 13. Nxb5 Qd8 14. Bf4 Rc8 15. Na7 Be7 16. Bb5+ Nc6 17. Nxc8 Qxc8 18. exd5 Nxd5 19. Bd2 Bf6 20. c4 Nde7 21. Rb1 O-O 22. b4 Nd4 23. a4 e5 24. Qe1 Nef5 25. Bc3 Nxb5 26. cxb5 Bh4 27. Qc1 e4 28. fxe4 Bxe4 29. Rb2 Re8 30. a5 Bd3 31. Rd1 Bxb5 32. Bd2 Qe6 33. Qc5 Bc6 34. Bc3 Ne3 (Zhou: "[Kantāns] should not have gone Ne3... We were looking at just Ba8 [instead]") 35. Rd6 (Agrest: "After Rd6, it looks tough." Zhou: "I think [Kantāns] could have gone for this [Qc4]... There was an endgame here.") Rd8 (Zhou: "[Qc4] would have been better than [Rd8].") 36. Qd4 Bf6 37. Rxd8+ Be8 38. Rd6 Bxd4 39. Rxe6 fxe6 40. Bxd4 Nc4 41. Ra2 1–0 (Agrest: "It looks like you are queening in a couple of moves, so no problem.")

== Awards and nominations ==
Ceremony	Year	Category	Result	Ref.
The Streamer Awards	2021	Best Chess Streamer	Nominated	
