= Frank Anderson (chess player) =

Canadian chess player (1928–1980)

Frank Ross Anderson
Personal information
- Born: 3 January 1928 Edmonton, Alberta, Canada
- Died: 18 September 1980 (aged 52) San Diego, California, U.S.

Chess career
- Country: Canada
- Title: International Master (1954)

Frank Ross Anderson (1928–1980) was a Canadian chess master and writer. He twice won the gold medal at Chess Olympiads for the best score on Board 2. He also tied for first at the 1953 Canadian Chess Championship and won the title again in 1955.

== Biography ==
Anderson learned to play chess while bedridden as a child with rheumatoid arthritis in Toronto. He began with correspondence chess, at which he quickly became a strong player. He was encouraged by chess promoter Bernard Freedman (who became his first sponsor), his good friend Keith Kerns, and later by John G. Prentice, who served as Canada's FIDE representative. Anderson graduated from the University of Toronto with a degree in the sciences.

Anderson's first noteworthy result was in the 1946 Canadian Championship at Toronto. He scored 10/13 in the preliminaries, just missing qualification for the top section finals; he won section 2 of the finals. He won the Toronto Championship six times (1947, 1948, 1950, 1951, 1952, 1958). In 1948, he tied with future grandmaster Arthur Bisguier for first place in the US Junior Championship at Oak Ridge, Tennessee. Anderson won the Ontario Open Championship in 1948, 1949, and 1951.

He twice won the Canadian Chess Championship. At Arvida in 1949, he tied for 3rd-4th, after Maurice Fox and Fedor Bohatirchuk. In 1951, he took 2nd, behind Povilas Vaitonis, at Vancouver. In 1953, he tied for 1st with Daniel Yanofsky at Winnipeg. In 1955, Anderson topped the field at Ottawa. In 1957, he tied for 3rd-4th with Miervaldis Jurševskis, after Vaitonis and Géza Füster, at Vancouver.

Anderson played three times for Canada at Chess Olympiads (1954, 1958, 1964). He won the second-board gold medal at Amsterdam 1954, with a score of +13 =2 -2, and repeated the feat at Munich 1958, with a score of +9 =3 -1. At Tel Aviv 1964, he scored +4 =3 -5 on second board.

At Munich, he came close to earning the grandmaster title, but became ill (reaction to an incorrect prescription), and was unable to play his final round, which made him ineligible. Anderson said that even if he had played and lost, he would have made the final norm necessary for the title. However, according to chess historian David Cohen, a subsequent examination of the rules then in effect did not support the claim. Anderson's Olympiad totals were +26 =8 -8, for 71.4 percent.

Awarded the International Master title in 1954, Anderson was the first Canadian-born IM.

He lost a transatlantic cable game against Igor Bondarevsky played over four days in February 1954 at the Canadian Hobby and Homecraft Show. Anderson won a return game when Bondarevsky visited Toronto a few months later in July 1954.

Anderson scored 7/10 in the 1956 Canadian Open Chess Championship in Montreal for a shared 8th-12th place, drawing his last-round game against the 13-year-old prodigy, Bobby Fischer.

Anderson wrote a weekly chess column for the Hamilton Spectator from 1955–64, and was co-author (with Keith Kerns) of the tournament book, Fourth Biennial World Junior Chess Championship, Toronto 1957. In it, he came up with an innovation by omitting the customary dash when using descriptive notation - that is, writing PK4 instead of the normal P-K4.

A computer expert, he played with a chess program in 1958.

Anderson moved to California after the 1964 Olympiad, settling with his wife, Sylvia, in San Diego, where he ran a tax consulting business.

He was inducted posthumously into the Canadian Chess Hall of Fame in 2001.

The Canadian Encyclopedia states that: "Had Anderson's ill health not kept him from an active chess career, he would have become a grandmaster."

In 2009, American International Master John Donaldson published the chess biography, The Life and Games of Frank Anderson.

== Chess style ==
Golombek's Encyclopedia of Chess described Anderson as especially expert in opening theory. His style was precise and positional, with an emphasis on the endgame, but he could also create clever tactics. He favored 1.e4 as White, often playing the Ruy Lopez, and preferred knights to bishops.

== Notable games ==
Three of Anderson's wins over grandmasters are given below. The competition was extremely strong: Yanofsky was an eight-time Canadian champion, Bondarevsky was a Soviet champion, and Ståhlberg was a many-time Swedish champion and a 1953 world championship candidate.

Daniel Yanofsky-Frank Anderson, Closed Canadian Chess Championship, Vancouver 1951, Ruy Lopez, Open Defence (C81): 1.e4 e5 2.Nf3 Nc6 3.Bb5 a6 4.Ba4 Nf6 5.0-0 Nxe4 6.d4 b5 7.Bb3 d5 8.dxe5 Be6 9.Qe2 Nc5 10.Rd1 Be7 11.Be3 Nxb3 12.axb3 Qc8 13.Bg5 Bxg5 14.Nxg5 0-0 15.c4 Ne7 16.cxd5 Bxd5 17.Qc2 g6 18.f3 h6 19.Nc3 c6 20.Nge4 Qe6 21.Nf6+ Kg7 22.Re1 Bxb3 23.Qc1 b4 24.Ng4 Nf5 25.Ne4 Qc4 26.Qf4 Qd4+ 27.Kh1 Rfe8 28.Qc1 h5 29.Ngf6 Rh8 30.Nc5 h4 31.h3 Bc4 32.Nce4 Ng3+ 33.Nxg3 hxg3 34.Ne4 Bd5 35.Nxg3 Rxh3+ 36.gxh3 Bxf3+ 0–1.

Frank Anderson-Igor Bondarevsky, Toronto 1954, Ruy Lopez, Modern Steinitz Defence (C73): 1.e4 e5 2.Nf3 Nc6 3.Bb5 a6 4.Ba4 d6 5.Bxc6+ bxc6 6.d4 f6 7.c4 Ne7 8.Nc3 g6 9.c5 Bg7 10.cxd6 cxd6 11.0-0 Bg4 12.dxe5 dxe5 13.Qe2 0-0 14.h3 Be6 15.Na4 Qa5 16.Qc2 g5 17.Nc5 Bf7 18.Be3 Qc7 19.Rfd1 Rfd8 20.Rxd8+ Rxd8 21.Nxa6 Qc8 22.Nc5 Ng6 23.a4 Bf8 24.a5 Bxc5 25.Qxc5 Qa6 26.Rc1 Rc8 27.Qd6 Kg7 28.b4 h6 29.Nh2 h5 30.Nf1 h4 31.Nh2 Nf8 32.Ng4 Nh7 33.Bb6 Qa8 34.Rc3 c5 35.Rxc5 Rxc5 36.Bxc5 Qxe4 37.Be3 Qd5 38.Qe7 Qc6 39.Nh6 Kxh6 40.Qxf7 Qc3 41.Qe7 Qd3 42.Qe6 Qd8 43.a6 Nf8 44.Qc6 1–0.

Frank Anderson-Gideon Ståhlberg, Munich Olympiad 1958, Sicilian Defence, B45: 1.e4 c5 2.Nf3 Nc6 3.d4 cxd4 4.Nxd4 Nf6 5.Nc3 e6 6.Ndb5 Bb4 7.a3 Bxc3+ 8.Nxc3 d5 9.exd5 exd5 10.Bd3 0-0 11.0-0 h6 12.Bf4 d4 13.Nb5 a6 14.Nd6 Bg4 15.Qd2 Qd7 16.h3 Be6 17.Rfe1 Rfd8 18.Re2 Nd5 19.Bh2 Qe7 20.Ne4 Rc8 21.Rae1 b5 22.Kh1 Qf8 23.Ng3 Nde7 24.Qf4 Bc4 25.Qe4 Bxd3 26.Qxd3 Ng6 27.Nf5 Qc5 28.Qf3 Kh7 29.Qg4 d3 30.cxd3 Nd4 31.Re5 Qb6 32.h4 Nxf5 33.Rxf5 Qd4 34.Qxd4 Rxd4 35.h5 Nh8 36.Be5 Rd5 37.Rf3 f6 38.Bc3 Rxh5+ 39.Kg1 Rc6 40.Re7 Ng6 41.Ra7 Kg8 42.Ra8+ Kh7 43.Ra7 Kg8 44.g3 Rd5 45.Re3 Rd8 46.d4 Rcd6 47.Kg2 R8d7 48.Rxd7 Rxd7 49.Re6 Ra7 50.Bb4 Kf7 51.Rb6 Nf8 52.Bc5 Nd7 53.Rc6 Ra8 54.b4 h5 55.Kf3 g5 56.Rc7 Ke8 57.Ke4 a5 58.Kf5 axb4 59.Bxb4 h4 60.gxh4 gxh4 61.d5 h3 62.Rc3 Kf7 63.Rxh3 Nb6 64.d6 Re8 65.Rh7+ Kg8 66.Rb7 1–0.
