= Li Yunshan =

Chinese-Canadian chess player (born 2002)

Personal information
- Born: April 29, 2002 (age 24) Chengdu, Sichuan, China

Chess career
- Country: China (until 2023); Canada (since 2023)
- Title: Woman International Master (2020)
- Peak rating: 2294 (March 2023)

Li Yunshan (Chinese: 李芸杉) is a Chinese-Canadian chess player.

== Chess career ==
In 2010, she won the U8 Girls section of the World Youth Chess Championship.

In April 2024, she tied for first place with Maili-Jade Ouellet and Svitlana Demchenko in the Canadian Women's Chess Championship, ultimately finishing in third place on tiebreak scores.

In April 2025, she won the Canadian Women's Chess Championship.

In July 2025, she played in the Women's Chess World Cup 2025, where she was defeated by Gulnar Mammadova in the first round.

== Personal life ==
She studied anthropology and psychology at the University of Toronto and is pursuing a masters in social science at the University of Chicago.
