= 1975 in chess =

Events in chess in 1975;

== Top players ==
FIDE top 10 by Elo rating - January 1975

1. Bobby Fischer United States 2780
2. Anatoly Karpov Soviet Union 2705
3. Viktor Korchnoi Soviet Union 2665
4. Tigran Petrosian Soviet Union 2645
5. Lev Polugaevsky Soviet Union 2645
6. Mikhail Tal Soviet Union 2645
7. Lajos Portisch Hungary 2635
8. Bent Larsen Denmark 2625
9. Boris Spassky Soviet Union 2625
10. Robert Hübner West Germany 2615

== Chess news in brief ==
- In what is an unsatisfactory chapter in the history of the World Chess Championship, Bobby Fischer and FIDE fail to agree terms for a defence of his world title. The American has many requests, including some radical changes to the format of a match between himself and challenger Anatoly Karpov. Most of his demands are met, but there are two outstanding issues which continue to cause an impasse at the FIDE special conference in The Netherlands. Fischer's unresolved demands are firstly, that the match be of unlimited duration and secondly, that the challenger should need to win by two clear games (a minimum of 10-8). After being informed by telephone that FIDE will not accede to his final two demands, Fischer steadfastly holds to the threatened resignation of his title, despite much cajoling by U.S. delegation representative Ed Edmondson and by Florencio Campomanes, the potential match organiser. The title is therefore handed to Karpov by default, and he becomes the first world champion to gain the title this way. Karpov's successes, the USSR's great showing at last year's Olympiad and their subsequent recapture of the World Junior (Chekhov) and World Correspondence (Estrin) titles, indicate that the hitherto Soviet domination of world chess is not yet over.
- Nona Gaprindashvili successfully defends her Women's World Championship for the fourth time, by the comfortable margin of 8½-3½, against fellow Georgian, Nana Alexandria in Pitsunda/Tbilisi. Gaprindashvili has been the champion since 1962, when she defeated Elisabeth Bykova, the previous holder.
- Anatoly Karpov wins in Milan, his first tournament outing since becoming world champion. He wins again in Ljubljana, at the 3rd Vidmar Memorial with 11/15, ahead of Svetozar Gligorić (10/15), Zoltán Ribli, Semyon Furman and Vlastimil Hort (all 9½/15).
- Lajos Portisch wins at Wijk aan Zee with 10½/15, ahead of Vlastimil Hort (10/15) and Jan Smejkal (9½/15).
- In his hometown of Tallinn, Paul Keres wins with 10½/15, ahead of Fridrik Olafsson and Boris Spassky (both 9½/15). He also wins in Vancouver, where he delivers simultaneous exhibitions before flying home. In view of his heart attack two years previously and medical advice that he should give up international tournaments, it is believed that his exertions may have been excessive. A further two heart attacks end his life in a Helsinki hospital, just a short time after playing some of the best chess of his career.
- Ljubomir Ljubojević has a very successful year, winning three important tournaments. In Manila, he scores 7/10 to head a strong field, including Lev Polugaevsky, Henrique Mecking, Bent Larsen and Helmut Pfleger (2nd-5th, 6/10). There are further victories at Las Palmas' Ruy Lopez Memorial and at the 15th IBM tournament in Amsterdam.
- The re-emergence of Tigran Petrosian as the dominant force at the 43rd USSR Chess Championship surprises many, following his disappointing showing at the Alekhine Memorial (sixth place). He scores 10/15, to head up a group of GMs on 9½/15 (Rafael Vaganian, Boris Gulko, Oleg Romanishin and Mikhail Tal). The tournament is held in Yerevan, Armenia's capital city and the magnanimous victor attributes his success to the support of local fans.
- England's Teesside (CHO'D Alexander Memorial) tournament is the strongest in the UK for decades. Efim Geller is triumphant with 9½/14, ahead of Vasily Smyslov (8½/14). The players sharing third place are David Bronstein, Robert Hübner and Vlastimil Hort (all 8/14).
- At Moscow's 3rd Alekhine Memorial, Efim Geller celebrates another good performance, his 10½/15 edging out Boris Spassky on 10/15. Ratmir Kholmov, Viktor Korchnoi and Rafael Vaganian share third place on 9½/15.
- Lone Pine sees Vladimir Liberzon, a former Soviet grandmaster who had emigrated to Israel take the honours with 7½/10. Larry Evans finishes second on 7/10, while Walter Browne heads up a number of players on 6½/10, including Argentinians Oscar Panno and Miguel Quinteros.
- Zoltán Ribli shines at Budapest, sharing a tournament win with Lev Polugaevsky (both 10½/15), ahead of Jan Smejkal (9½/15).
- At Ourense, Bent Larsen triumphs with 11½/15 from Ulf Andersson and Ljubomir Ljubojević (both 10½/15).
- The tournament at Montilla-Moriles results in a shared win for Lev Polugaevsky and Ivan Radulov, with 6/9. There follows Helmut Pfleger and Lubomir Kavalek (both 5½/9).
- Valery Chekhov takes the World Junior Chess Championship in Tjentiste with 10/13, ahead of Larry Christiansen (9½/10) and Jonathan Mestel (9/10). England celebrates junior success at the European Junior Chess Championship in Groningen, when John Nunn runs out the winner with 6/9. David Goodman follows up with a second English victory at the World Cadet Championship, in Creil, France. Along with the successes of Tony Miles and Jonathan Mestel in 1974, there is belief that chess in the UK is reaching new levels of popularity.
- FIDE President and former world champion, Dr. Max Euwe embarks on two world tours to help popularise chess in Asia and Africa. He finds there is an upsurge of interest in Asia, particularly in The Philippines, where there are 4 million known players. In contrast, African chess development is only in its infancy.
- Murray Chandler wins the New Zealand Chess Championship, aged just fifteen.
- Yakov Estrin, the Russian over-the-board IM, wins the 7th World Correspondence Chess Championship.
- English players Tony Miles and Stewart Reuben agree a draw at the Luton Congress without playing a single move. The last round game is recorded as a draw, but later, after the score-sheets have been scrutinised, the organiser writes to both players requesting the return of the appropriate prize monies, as their actions are deemed an infraction of the rules (—a player may only offer a draw at the moment he has made a move and must then start the other player's clock).
- Boris Spassky is married to Marina Stcherbatcheff on September 30. His new wife is a secretary at the French embassy in Moscow, and the 2-minute ceremony is held urgently in Moscow, amidst fears that she may have to leave the country.
- New York City hosts the United States' largest exhibition of chess manuscripts and miscellany ever seen.

== Births ==
- Vladimir Kramnik, Russian GM, former classical and undisputed world champion - June 25
- Veselin Topalov, Bulgarian GM and the FIDE 2005 world champion - March 15
- Alexander Onischuk, Ukrainian-American GM and former national champion - September 3
- Yury Shulman, Belarusian-American GM, winner of both national championships - April 29
- Roman Slobodjan, German GM and former world junior chess champion - January 1
- Nino Khurtsidze, Georgian WGM and two times the world junior girls' champion - September 28
- Tomasz Markowski, Polish GM, many times the national champion - July 30
- Alexandre Lesiege, Canadian GM and three times the national champion - August 18
- Wang Lei (chess player), Chinese WGM, four times the national women's champion - February 4
- Vladimir Georgiev, Bulgarian GM and distinguished coach - August 27
- Roy Fyllingen, Norwegian IM and former national champion - January 31
- Piotr Murdzia, Polish IM, multiple winner of the world chess solving championship - February 20
- Natalia Khoudgarian, Russian-Canadian WIM, Canadian Olympiad player - ?

== Deaths ==
- Paul Keres, Estonian GM, for many years a prominent world championship candidate - June 5
- Friedrich Samisch, German master, unofficial Austrian championand noted theorist - August 16
- Lajos Steiner, Hungarian-Australian IM and former champion of both countries - April 22
- Nicolas Rossolimo, Multi-national GM who won the French and Paris championships - July 24
- Karel Opocensky, Czech IM and International Arbiter, four times the national champion - November 16
- Hans Johner, Swiss IM who won the national championship many times in the 1930s - December 2
- Vladimir Vukovic, Croatian IM and International Arbiter, also writer and theoretician - November 18
- Georg Kieninger, German IM, three times winner of the national championship - January 25
- Abraham Baratz, Romanian-French Master who won the Paris Championship - ?
- Norman Tweed Whitaker, American IM who twice shared the US Open title - May 20
- John Morrison, Canadian Master and many times winner of the national championship - March 1
- Karl Fabel, German player, distinguished composer of chess problems - March 3
