= Leonid Gerzhoy =

Israeli-Canadian chess player (born 1987)

Personal information
- Born: November 7, 1987 (age 38) Moscow, Soviet Union

Chess career
- Country: Israel (until 2007); Canada (since 2007)
- Title: International Master (2003)
- FIDE rating: 2348 (August 2019)
- Peak rating: 2503 (September 2011)

Leonid Gerzhoy (Hebrew: לאוניד גרזוי, Russian: Леонид Гержо́й; born November 7, 1987) is a Canadian chess player who holds the FIDE title of International Master.

== Biography ==
Gerzhoy was born on November 7, 1987, in Moscow and moved to Israel in 1992. He became an International Master there by 2003. In 2003 he played for Israel at the World Youth Chess Olympiad in Denizli where he won 6th place and a rank of 8 points. In 2005 he immigrated to Canada and a year later won a second place at the Canadian Championship. In 2007 he became a winner of Canadian Junior Championship and by 2009 received a Grandmaster norm at the World Open. In 2010 he was a winner of the Summer Open tournament of Hart House and next year won again at the Philadelphia International with 8 out of 9 score. The same year, during Ontario Open he tied for first with Bator Sambuev.

During the 2010 Chess Olympiad he won three games with three draws out of nine games total. Two years later he participated at the 2012 Olympiad, this time in Istanbul, where he won three times again, and had four draws as well. He tied for first U2500 player at the 2013 World Open.

In 2015, he tied for first with Tomas Krnan and Eric Hansen in the Canadian Chess Championship.
