= World Chess Championship 1975 =

World Chess Championship match intended to be played in 1975

	Defending champion	Challenger
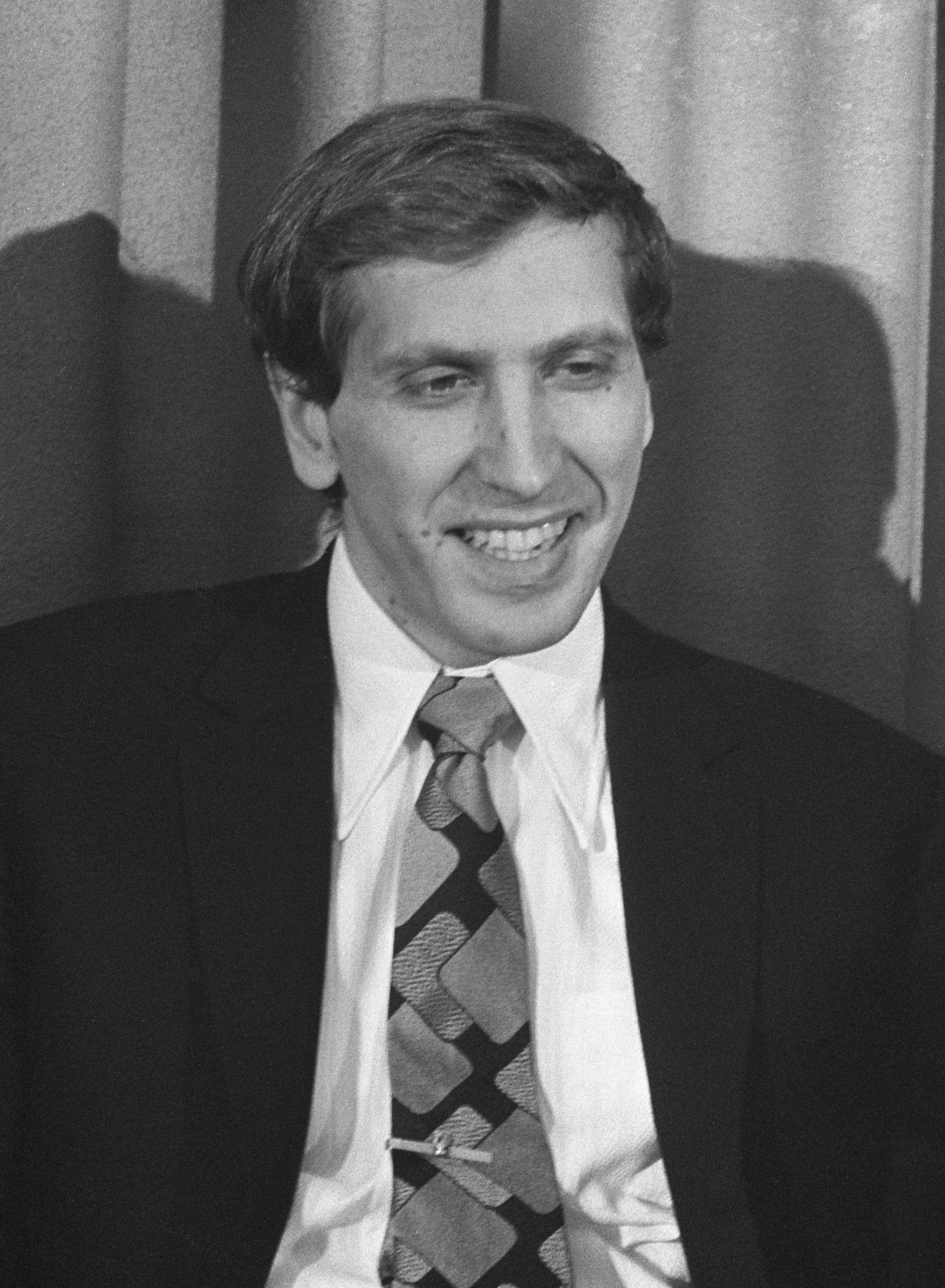
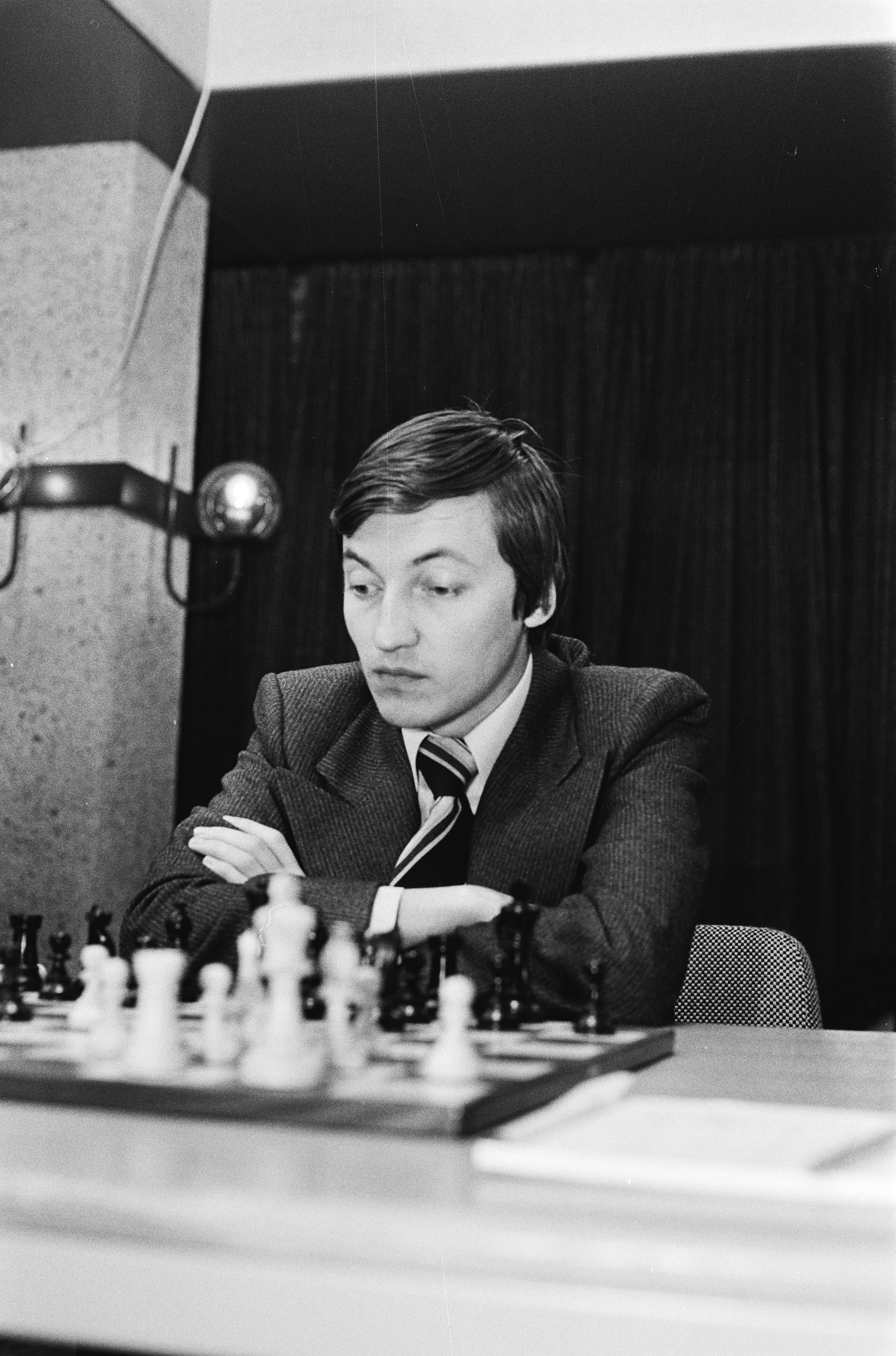
	Bobby Fischer	Anatoly Karpov
	(United States) Bobby Fischer	(Soviet Union) Anatoly Karpov
loss on forfeit	Scores	win on forfeit
	Born 9 March 1943; 32 years old	Born 23 May 1951; 23 years old
	Winner of the 1972 World Chess Championship	Winner of the 1974 Candidates Tournament
	Rating: 2780 (World No. 1)	Rating: 2705 (World No. 2)

The 1975 World Chess Championship was not played due to a dispute over the match format. Champion Bobby Fischer (United States) was to play Anatoly Karpov (Soviet Union) in Manila, commencing June 1, 1975. Fischer refused to play the then-standard "Best of 24 games" match and, after FIDE was unable to work out a compromise, forfeited his title instead. Karpov was named World Champion by default on April 3, 1975.

== 1973 Interzonal tournaments ==
Two 18-player, single round robin Interzonals were played with the top three from each qualifying for the Candidates Tournament. Leningrad and Petrópolis, Brazil were the venues.

June 1973 Interzonal, Leningrad
		Rating	1	2	3	4	5	6	7	8	9	10	11	12	13	14	15	16	17	18	Total	Tie break (not used)
1-2	Viktor Korchnoi (Soviet Union)	2635	-	½	1	½	1	1	½	1	½	1	1	1	½	1	0	1	1	1	13½	108.25
1-2	Anatoly Karpov (Soviet Union)	2545	½	-	½	1	½	½	1	½	1	½	1	½	1	1	1	1	1	1	13½	104.25
3	Robert Byrne (United States)	2570	0	½	-	½	½	1	½	½	½	1	1	1	½	1	1	1	1	1	12½	
4	Jan Smejkal (Czechoslovakia)	2570	½	0	½	-	0	0	½	½	1	1	0	1	1	1	1	1	1	1	11	
5-6	Robert Hübner (West Germany)	2600	0	½	½	1	-	0	½	1	1	½	½	1	½	1	½	½	0	1	10	79.50
5-6	Bent Larsen (Denmark)	2620	0	½	0	1	1	-	1	0	0	½	0	1	1	½	1	½	1	1	10	75.00
7	Gennady Kuzmin (Soviet Union)	2565	½	0	½	½	½	0	-	1	0	½	½	½	1	½	1	1	1	½	9½	
8-10	Mikhail Tal (Soviet Union)	2655	0	½	½	½	0	1	0	-	1	½	1	1	½	0	0	1	0	1	8½	67.25
8-10	Svetozar Gligorić (Yugoslavia)	2595	½	0	½	0	0	1	1	0	-	½	½	½	½	1	½	0	1	1	8½	64.00
8-10	Mark Taimanov (Soviet Union)	2595	0	½	0	0	½	½	½	½	½	-	½	1	½	½	1	½	1	½	8½	63.00
11-12	Miguel Quinteros (Argentina)	2480	0	0	0	1	½	1	½	0	½	½	-	0	0	½	½	1	½	1	7½	55.75
11-12	Ivan Radulov (Bulgaria)	2510	0	½	0	0	0	0	½	0	½	0	1	-	1	1	½	½	1	1	7½	49.50
13-14	Wolfgang Uhlmann (East Germany)	2550	½	0	½	0	½	0	0	½	½	½	1	0	-	½	½	½	½	1	7	51.75
13-14	Eugenio Torre (Philippines)	2430	0	0	0	0	0	½	½	1	0	½	½	0	½	-	½	1	1	1	7	45.00
15	Josip Rukavina (Yugoslavia)	2460	1	0	0	0	½	0	0	1	½	0	½	½	½	½	-	0	1	½	6½	
16	Vladimir Tukmakov (Soviet Union)	2560	0	0	0	0	½	½	0	0	1	½	0	½	½	0	1	-	½	1	6	
17	Guillermo Estévez Morales (Cuba)	2385	0	0	0	0	1	0	0	1	0	0	½	0	½	0	0	½	-	1	4½	
18	Miguel Cuéllar (Colombia)	2400	0	0	0	0	0	0	½	0	0	½	0	0	0	0	½	0	0	-	1½	

Korchnoi, Karpov, and Byrne qualified for the Candidates Tournament.

July–August 1973 Interzonal, Petrópolis
		Rating	1	2	3	4	5	6	7	8	9	10	11	12	13	14	15	16	17	18	Total	Tie break (not used)
1	Henrique Mecking (Brazil)	2575	-	½	½	½	1	½	½	1	½	½	1	½	½	1	½	1	1	1	12	
2-4	Efim Geller (Soviet Union)	2585	½	-	½	½	½	1	½	½	½	1	½	½	1	1	0	1	1	1	11½	89.50
2-4	Lev Polugaevsky (Soviet Union)	2640	½	½	-	1	½	½	½	½	½	½	½	0	1	1	1	1	1	1	11½	88.00
2-4	Lajos Portisch (Hungary)	2645	½	½	0	-	½	½	½	½	1	½	1	½	1	½	1	1	1	1	11½	85.50
5	Vasily Smyslov (Soviet Union)	2600	0	½	½	½	-	0	1	½	½	1	½	½	1	1	½	1	1	1	11	
6	David Bronstein (Soviet Union)	2585	½	0	½	½	1	-	0	½	½	1	1	1	½	1	½	1	1	0	10½	
7	Vlastimil Hort (Czechoslovakia)	2610	½	½	½	½	0	1	-	1	0	0	1	½	½	½	1	½	1	1	10	
8	Vladimir Savon (Soviet Union)	2570	0	½	½	½	½	½	0	-	½	0	1	1	½	½	1	1	½	1	9½	
9-10	Borislav Ivkov (Yugoslavia)	2535	½	½	½	0	½	½	1	½	-	½	½	½	½	½	½	1	½	½	9	72.75
9-10	Ljubomir Ljubojević (Yugoslavia)	2570	½	0	½	½	0	0	1	1	½	-	0	1	½	0	1	½	1	1	9	67.50
11	Samuel Reshevsky (United States)	2575	0	½	½	0	½	0	0	0	½	1	-	1	½	½	1	1	½	1	8½	
12-13	Oscar Panno (Argentina)	2580	½	½	1	½	½	0	½	0	½	0	0	-	½	½	½	½	1	1	8	62.50
12-13	Paul Keres (Soviet Union)	2605	½	0	0	0	0	½	½	½	½	½	½	½	-	½	½	1	1	1	8	54.25
14	Florin Gheorghiu (Romania)	2530	0	0	0	½	0	0	½	½	½	1	½	½	½	-	1	½	½	1	7½	
15	Peter Biyiasas (Canada)	2395	½	1	0	0	½	½	0	0	½	0	0	½	½	0	-	½	1	1	6½	
16-18	Tan Lian Ann (Singapore)	2365	0	0	0	0	0	0	½	0	0	½	0	½	0	½	½	-	½	0	3	22.00
16-18	Werner Hug (Switzerland)	2445	0	0	0	0	0	0	0	½	½	0	½	0	0	½	0	½	-	½	3	20.25
16-18	Shimon Kagan (Israel)	2405	0	0	0	0	0	1	0	0	½	0	0	0	0	0	0	1	½	-	3	19.50

Henrique Mecking qualified outright for the Candidates Tournament, while the three players tied for second place contested a playoff in Portorož for the remaining two spots.

September 1973 playoff, Portorož
		Rating	1	2	3	Total
1	Lajos Portisch (Hungary)	2650	-	11==	=1==	5½
2	Lev Polugaevsky (Soviet Union)	2625	00==	-	110=	3½
3	Efim Geller (Soviet Union)	2605	=0==	001=	-	3

Portisch and Polugaevsky qualified.

== 1974 Candidates tournament ==
The 1974 Candidates Tournament was played as knockout matches. Spassky as the loser of the last championship match and Petrosian as loser of the previous candidates final were seeded directly into the tournament and joined by the top three from each of the two interzonals.

The first round matches were first to win three games, draws not counting. Semifinals were first to four wins, while the final was first to five wins but with a maximum of 24 games. Karpov beat Korchnoi 3–2 with 19 draws, earning the right to challenge Fischer.

Quarterfinals
Moscow, Jan–Feb 1974
(Soviet Union) Anatoly Karpov	5½
(Soviet Union) Lev Polugaevsky	2½
San Juan, Puerto Rico, Jan 1974
(Soviet Union) Boris Spassky	4½
(United States) Robert Byrne	1½
Augusta, Georgia, USA 1974
(Soviet Union) Viktor Korchnoi	7½
(Brazil) Henrique Mecking	5½
Palma de Mallorca 1974
(Soviet Union) Tigran Petrosian	7
(Hungary) Lajos Portisch	6

Semifinals
Leningrad, Apr–May 1974
(Soviet Union) Anatoly Karpov	7
(Soviet Union) Boris Spassky	4
Odessa, Apr 1974
(Soviet Union) Viktor Korchnoi	3½
(Soviet Union) Tigran Petrosian (forfeit)	1½

Final
Moscow, Sep–Nov 1974
(Soviet Union) Anatoly Karpov	12½
(Soviet Union) Viktor Korchnoi	11½

The semifinal stage was marked by the presence of two ex-champions, Petrosian and Spassky, playing in different matches. The two had faced each other in the 1966 and 1969 title matches. Both were eliminated in this stage of the current cycle. Although the match rules called for four wins in the semifinals, Petrosian resigned the match after losing three games.

=== Candidates Final Match ===
Candidates Match 1974
	1	2	3	4	5	6	7	8	9	10	11	12	13	14	15	16	17	18	19	20	21	22	23	24	Points
Anatoly Karpov (USSR)	½	1	½	½	½	1	½	½	½	½	½	½	½	½	½	½	1	½	0	½	0	½	½	½	12½
Viktor Korchnoi (USSR)	½	0	½	½	½	0	½	½	½	½	½	½	½	½	½	½	0	½	1	½	1	½	½	½	11½

== Championship match ==
Fischer had, prior to his 1972 match against Spassky, felt that the first-to-12½-points format was not fair, since it encouraged whoever was leading to play for draws instead of wins. He himself adopted this strategy in the match: after having taken a comfortable lead, he drew games 14–20. With each game, he coasted closer to the title, while Spassky lost a chance to fight back. This style of chess offended Fischer. Instead he demanded the format be changed to that used in the very first World Championship, between Wilhelm Steinitz and Johannes Zukertort, where the winner was the first player to score 10 wins with draws not counting. In case of a 9–9 score, the champion would retain title, and the prize fund split equally. A FIDE Congress was held in 1974 during the Nice Olympiad. The delegates voted in favor of Fischer's 10-win proposal, but rejected the 9–9 clause as well as the possibility of an unlimited match. In response, Fischer refused to defend his title. Deadlines were extended for Fischer's reconsideration, but he did not respond, so Karpov was named World Champion by default on April 3, 1975.

=== Speculation of result ===
This was the first forfeited World Championship match in history. (Note: Magnus Carlsen declined to defend his title in 2023, although in that case, there was still a match played between two other players) Thus, there has been much speculation on what would have been the result.

Garry Kasparov argued that Karpov would have had good chances, because he had beaten Spassky convincingly and was a new breed of tough professional, and indeed had higher-quality games, while Fischer had been inactive for three years. Spassky thought that Fischer would have won in 1975 but Karpov would have qualified again and beaten Fischer in 1978. According to Susan Polgar, commentators are divided, with a slight majority believing Fischer would have won, an opinion she shares.

In 2020, Karpov said, "I think I had chances. I can't say I had better chances [than Fischer] – I considered it would be a tough match."

== Aftermath ==
Karpov had become world champion without defeating the previous champion in a match, causing some to question the legitimacy of his title. He answered these questions by participating in almost every major tournament for the next ten years. He convincingly won the very strong Milan tournament in 1975, and captured his first of three Soviet titles in 1976. He created a phenomenal streak of tournament wins against the strongest players in the world. Karpov set a record of 9 consecutive tournament victories, until it was later broken by Garry Kasparov (15). As a result, most experts soon acknowledged him as a legitimate world champion.

Fischer did not play any competitive chess from 1973 to 1991. He re-emerged to play a match against Spassky in 1992, claiming he was still the World Champion. He then retired from chess permanently.
