= Artiom Samsonkin =

Belarusian-Canadian chess player (born 1989)

Personal information
- Born: June 23, 1989 (age 37)

Chess career
- Country: Belarus (until 2008); Canada (since 2008)
- Title: International Master (2007)
- Peak rating: 2437 (April 2018)

Artiom Samsonkin (Belarusian: Арцём Самсонкін; born June 23, 1989) is a Belarusian-Canadian chess player.

== Chess career ==
In 2007, Samsonkin tied for first in the Canadian Chess Championship with Nikolay Noritsyn, Jean Hébert, and Ron Livshits. He ultimately lost the championship to Noritsyn on tiebreaks.

In May 2008, he won the Canadian Junior Chess Championship.

In May 2011, he played in the Canadian Chess Championship, where he achieved a draw against Eric Hansen.

In August 2022, he played board 5 for Canada at the 44th Chess Olympiad, where he scored 3.5/6 and achieved a draw against Bardiya Daneshvar.

In January 2023, he won the top section (Master/Expert) of the Winter Open Chess Tournament hosted by the Central Florida Chess Club with a score of 4.5/5.
