= Robin van Kampen =

Dutch chess grandmaster (born 1994)

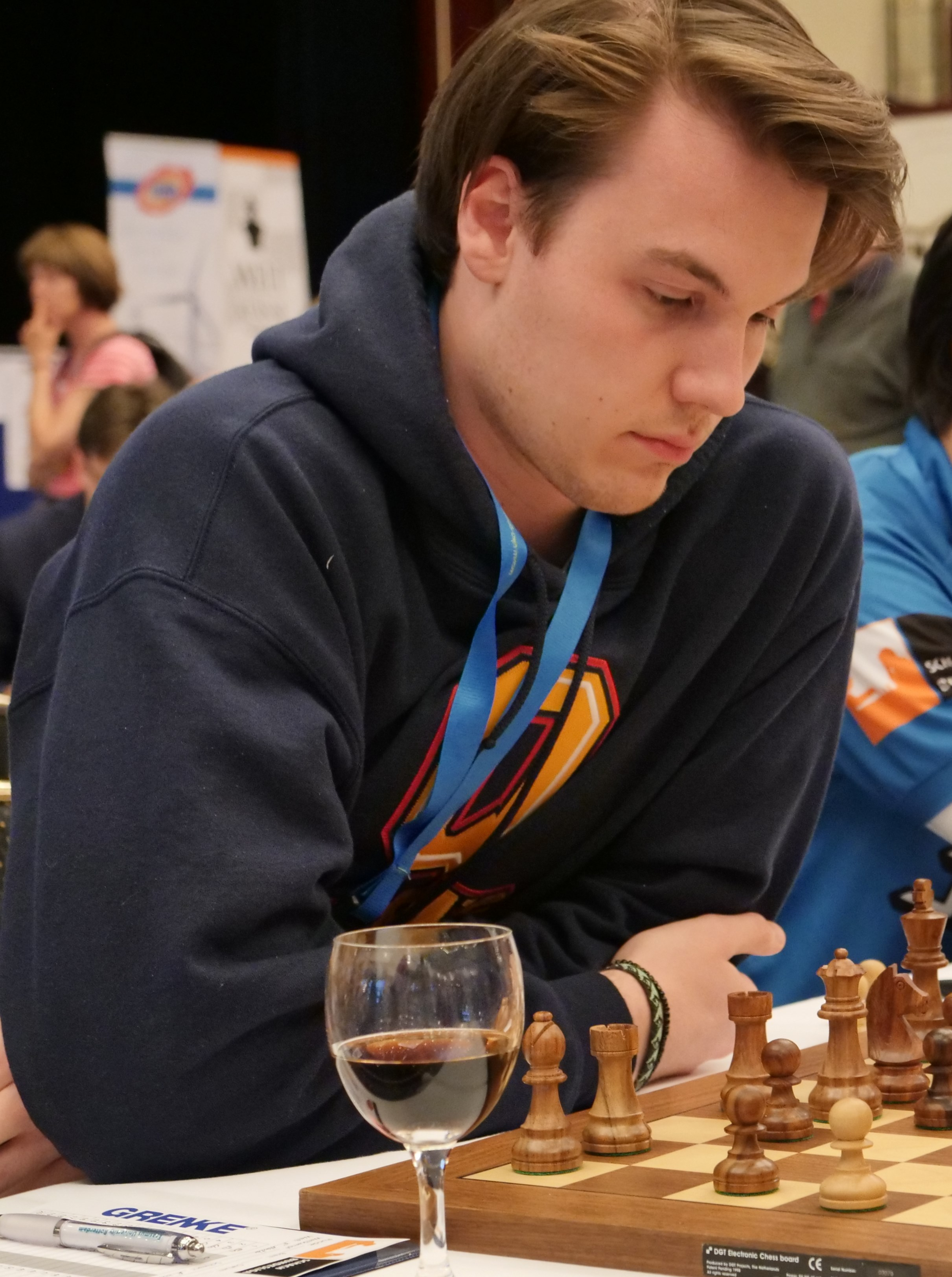
- Van Kampen in 2018

Personal information
- Born: 14 November 1994 (age 31) Blaricum, Netherlands

Chess career
- Country: Netherlands
- Title: Grandmaster (2011)
- FIDE rating: 2658 (September 2026)
- Peak rating: 2658 (June 2018)
- Peak ranking: No. 88 (June 2018)

Robin van Kampen (born 14 November 1994) is a Dutch chess grandmaster. At the age of 14, he won the Dutch U20 Championship. He achieved his grandmaster (GM) title at the age of 16 years, 8 months and 17 days. Van Kampen has represented the Netherlands at the 2013 European Team Chess Championship, and at the 41st and 42nd Chess Olympiad. Van Kampen is a research analyst at Caption Partners in New York as of July 2020.

== Chess career ==
Robin van Kampen was born in the Netherlands in the city of Blaricum and brought up in Bussum. He began playing chess at the age of seven and competing in club chess at the age of 8.

=== Dutch Youth Chess Championships ===
Robin van Kampen was Dutch youth champion for four consecutive years: in the under 12 division in 2006, under 14 in 2007, under 16 in 2008 and under 20 in 2009. This year-after-year domination of all Dutch players in his division class was punctuated with his 2009 victory matching Jan Timman's 1966 record for youngest ever Dutch Champion in the under 20 section. He was coached by Pascal Losekoot from 8 to 11 years of age.

=== Rising to Grandmaster title ===
He was awarded the title of FIDE Master (FM) in 2008. In 2009, he achieved his first International Master (IM) norm at the Batavia Chess Tournament, a round-robin event in Amsterdam. Van Kampen earned his third and last IM norm at the Atlantis Chess Closed Tournament in 2009. In October 2009, FIDE officially awarded him the IM title, thus becoming the youngest Dutch IM in history, a distinction he still holds.

At the end of 2009, at the Groningen Chess Festival, the newly minted IM played a four-game match with Timman, losing by 2.5-1.5 after a last-round defeat and exchanging wins in the first two rounds.

On 31 July 2011 van Kampen won the Helmut-Kohls Tournament in Dortmund, Germany (a closed GM tournament), where he also earned his final GM norm. By doing so he became the youngest Dutch chess player to qualify for the GM title, at the age of 16 years, 8 months and 17 days. This record has since been broken by Jorden van Foreest.

=== Tournament results ===
In 2010, he made his debut at the traditional Wijk aan Zee Corus Chess Tournament in the Grandmaster Group C, sharing 3rd–4th place with Daniele Vocaturo. In 2012, he shared victory with Hrant Melkumyan in the London Chess Classic FIDE Open.

In 2013, he placed second in the N1 Reykjavik Open, scoring half point behind Li Chao. That year he tied for first in the Basel Chess Festival and Riga Technical University Open. He also contributed to Guildford's victory at the 4NCL, scoring 8/9.

In 2015, van Kampen placed fourth in the Challengers group of the 77th Tata Steel Chess Tournament in Wijk aan Zee, behind Wei Yi, David Navara and Sam Shankland.

=== Online ===
Kampen streamed as one of the Chessbrahs until January 2020, along with other titled players such as GM Eric Hansen, GM Aman Hambleton, GM Aryan Tari, GM Yasser Seirawan, and FM Lefong Hua.
