= Interzonal tournament, Saltsjöbaden 1948 =

The 1948 Interzonal tournament was a major qualification event for the 1951 World Chess Championship, held in Saltsjöbaden, Sweden, from 16 July to 14 August in 1948. It was the first Interzonal tournament organised by FIDE, which was at the time emerging as the game's international governing body. The 20 player round robin tournament was won by David Bronstein, who, along with seven other players, advanced to the 1950 Candidates Tournament.

== Organization ==
Following the death of World Champion Alexander Alekhine in March 1946, FIDE endeavoured to take over administration of the World Chess Championship. Previously, all world championship matches had been privately organized with no formal qualification process. The process of organizing the new World Championship cycle ran into numerous problems in the chaotic post-war environment. In a 1946 meeting in The Hague, in addition to making plans for a multi-player World Championship tournament, FIDE formulated the plan to hold eight Zonal tournaments, with the winners of these events advancing to a new tournament, dubbed the "Interzonal". The top five players from the Interzonal were to advance to the Candidates Tournament alongside the five unsuccessful participants of the upcoming World Championship tournament.

The United States was invited to send two players to the World Championship; it was assumed at the time that Samuel Reshevsky and Reuben Fine, leading grandmasters and participants in the 1938 AVRO tournament, would be chosen. However, there was a feeling within the United States Chess Federation that they should have the right to determine their own selection process, and they decided to send the top two players from the 1946 U.S. Championship. Fine was unable to participate in this event due to his studies, and Reshevsky won the tournament by a 2½ point margin from Isaac Kashdan. It was later decided that Fine would be allowed to play in the World Championship after all, and Kashdan would be treated as the qualifier from the United States Zonal.

The first Zonal event, covering most of Europe, was held in Hilversum, Netherlands, in July 1947. The Belgian champion Albéric O'Kelly was the surprise winner, ahead of more fancied players such as Petar Trifunović, Luděk Pachman and László Szabó.

The 1947 Nordic Chess Championship in Helsinki was treated as a Zonal event for World Championship qualification purposes. This event finished in a tie for first place between Eero Böök and Gösta Stoltz. The two played an eight-game playoff match, which, however, also resulted in a tie with one win apiece. Böök was declared the winner due to his superior Sonneborn-Berger score.

The 1947 Canadian championship, won by Daniel Yanofsky, was also treated as a Zonal event, however no other Zonals were organised. Eventually it was decided to hold a ballot among FIDE delegates to determine the make-up of the tournament. From this, a list of sixteen players was created to join O'Kelly, Kashdan, Böök, and Yanofsky. In order of selection, the following players were nominated:

Miguel Najdorf, Isaac Boleslavsky, Gideon Ståhlberg, Salo Flohr, László Szabó, Alexander Kotov, Viacheslav Ragozin, Luděk Pachman, Arnold Denker, Igor Bondarevsky, Lajos Steiner, Erich Eliskases, David Bronstein, Petar Trifunović, Svetozar Gligorić, Savielly Tartakower

In addition, an extensive reserve list was created to cater for the inevitable withdrawals:

Andor Lilienthal, Gösta Stoltz, I. A. Horowitz, Erik Lundin, Folke Ekström, Ossip Bernstein, C. H. O'D. Alexander, Vasja Pirc, Vladas Mikėnas, Alexander Tolush, Jan Foltys, Julio Bolbochán, Hermann Pilnik, Esteban Canal, Nikolay Novotelnov, Olaf Barda, Jens Enevoldsen, Miguel Alemán Dovo

Players or their federations were required to finance their own travel and accommodation. In the end, O'Kelly, Kashdan, Denker, and Eliskases withdrew. They were replaced by Lilienthal, Stoltz, Lundin, and Pirc. Horowitz also declined a place; it is unclear why Pirc was accepted ahead of Ekström, Bernstein, and Alexander.

== Result ==
Najdorf was the pre-tournament favourite, and many believed he should have been invited to play in the 1948 World Championship tournament. However, he was in poor form; in round 4 he failed to win a one-pawn endgame against Kotov, and in round 5 he lost quickly to Lilienthal, who won a brilliancy prize for his effort. Szabó led for most of the tournament but stumbled towards the end. His loss in the final round to tail-ender Lundin allowed Bronstein to overtake him and win the tournament.

1948 Interzonal Tournament, Saltsjöbaden, Sweden
		1	2	3	4	5	6	7	8	9	10	11	12	13	14	15	16	17	18	19	20	Total	Tie break
1	David Bronstein (Soviet Union)	x	1	½	1	½	½	½	½	½	½	1	½	½	1	½	1	½	1	1	1	13½	
2	László Szabó (Hungary)	0	x	½	½	1	½	1	½	½	1	½	1	1	1	½	1	½	½	1	0	12½	
3	Isaac Boleslavsky (Soviet Union)	½	½	x	½	½	½	0	1	½	1	½	½	1	½	½	½	1	1	1	½	12	
4	Alexander Kotov (Soviet Union)	0	½	½	x	½	½	½	½	½	½	1	½	½	½	½	1	1	1	1	½	11½	
5	Andor Lilienthal (Soviet Union)	½	0	½	½	x	1	1	½	½	½	0	½	½	½	1	½	1	½	½	1	11	
6	Igor Bondarevsky (Soviet Union)	½	½	½	½	0	x	½	½	1	0	½	1	½	0	½	½	1	½	1	1	10½	93.75
7	Miguel Najdorf (Argentina)	½	0	1	½	0	½	x	½	½	1	0	1	½	0	½	1	½	½	1	1	10½	93.75
8	Gideon Ståhlberg (Sweden)	½	½	0	½	½	½	½	x	½	0	½	1	1	½	½	½	½	1	½	1	10½	93.75
9	Salo Flohr (Soviet Union)	½	½	½	½	½	0	½	½	x	½	½	½	½	½	½	½	1	½	1	1	10½	93.25
10	Petar Trifunović (Yugoslavia)	½	0	0	½	½	1	0	1	½	x	½	½	0	1	½	½	1	½	1	½	10	
11	Vasja Pirc (Yugoslavia)	0	½	½	0	1	½	1	½	½	½	x	½	½	0	1	0	½	1	½	½	9½	87.75
12	Svetozar Gligorić (Yugoslavia)	½	0	½	½	½	0	0	0	½	½	½	x	1	½	1	1	1	½	0	1	9½	84.50
13	Eero Böök (Finland)	½	0	0	½	½	½	½	0	½	1	½	0	x	½	½	½	½	1	1	1	9½	81.25
14	Viacheslav Ragozin (Soviet Union)	0	0	½	½	½	1	1	½	½	0	1	½	½	x	0	0	½	0	½	1	8½	78.75
15	Daniel Yanofsky (Canada)	½	½	½	½	0	½	½	½	½	½	0	0	½	1	x	0	½	½	½	1	8½	78.25
16	Savielly Tartakower (France)	0	0	½	0	½	½	0	½	½	½	1	0	½	1	1	x	0	½	½	½	8	
17	Luděk Pachman (Czechoslovakia)	½	½	0	0	0	0	½	½	0	0	½	0	½	½	½	1	x	1	½	1	7½	
18	Gösta Stoltz (Sweden)	0	½	0	0	½	½	½	0	½	½	0	½	0	1	½	½	0	x	½	½	6½	
19	Lajos Steiner (Australia)	0	0	0	0	½	0	0	½	0	0	½	1	0	½	½	½	½	½	x	½	5½	
20	Erik Lundin (Sweden)	0	1	½	½	0	0	0	0	0	½	½	0	0	0	0	½	0	½	½	x	4½	

Originally five players were to advance to the Candidates tournament. Following the withdrawal of Reshevsky, Fine, and Euwe, this number was increased to eight. The four players who tied for sixth place were to have played off for three spots in the Candidates tournament, but Bondarevsky had to withdraw due to illness, so the other three qualified automatically. According to some accounts, all four players plus Trifunović were originally invited to play in the Candidates Tournament; however, following Bondarevsky's withdrawal, Trifunović was "uninvited" in order to keep the numbers even.
