= Blumin =

Blumin is a surname. Notable people with the surname include:

- Boris Blumin (1908–1998), Canadian-American chess player
- Marina Maximilian Blumin (born 1987), Israeli singer-songwriter and actress
