= Charles Blake (chess player) =

Anglo-Canadian chess player and lawyer

- Born: 12 June 1880; London, England
- Died: 18 May 1961 (aged 80); Canada
- Education: Bedford Modern School

Charles Blake (12 June 1880 – 18 May 1961) was an Anglo-Canadian chess player and prominent lawyer in Canada. He won the U.S. Open Chess Championship in 1911, was the chess champion of Western Canada between 1907 and 1910, and was Winnipeg Chess Club Champion, between 1907 and 1910.

== Early life ==
Charles Blake was born in London on 12 June 1880. He was educated at Bedford Modern School.

== Legal career ==
Blake immigrated to Canada in 1903, read law in Winnipeg, Canada, and was called to the Manitoba Bar in 1909. He practised with Rothwell & Johnson in Winnipeg, between 1909 and 1911, before setting up his own practice in Brandon, Manitoba, in 1912. He moved to Ontario in 1925 and was called to the Ontario Bar in 1929 and the British Columbia Bar in 1949.

== Chess career ==
Blake was the chess champion of Western Canada between 1907 and 1910, and was Winnipeg Chess Club Champion, also from 1907 to 1910. Blake won the U.S. Open Chess Championship in 1911. He was said to be one of the few players who could effectively compete with Magnus Smith, the three-time Canadian Chess Champion. Blake was runner up in the Canadian Chess Championship in 1909 and 1913. In the 1920s, he won two Northwest Competitions in Canada.

== World War I ==
At the outset of World War I, Blake joined the 99th Manitoba Rangers. He was with the Canadian Expeditionary Force in France, 8th Battalion, 1st Canadian Division, from August 1914, where he was a lieutenant, later promoted to captain in October 1915. He was further promoted to the rank of major in September 1916.

== Death ==
Blake's wife predeceased him. He died, without issue, on 18 May 1961.
