= Sicilian Defence, Magnus Smith Trap =

Position: a8 black rook, c8 black bishop, d8 black queen, e8 black king, f8 black bishop, h8 black rook, a7 black pawn, e7 black pawn, f7 black pawn, h7 black pawn, c6 black pawn, d6 black pawn, f6 black knight, g6 black pawn, e5 white pawn, c4 white bishop, c3 white knight, a2 white pawn, b2 white pawn, c2 white pawn, f2 white pawn, g2 white pawn, h2 white pawn, a1 white rook, c1 white bishop, d1 white queen, e1 white king, h1 white rook

Position after 8.e5!

The Magnus Smith Trap is a chess opening trap in the Sicilian Defence, named after three-time Canadian chess champion Magnus Smith (1869–1934). In an article titled "The 'Magnus Smith Trap'" published in his Chess Notes column (hosted at the Chess History Center), chess historian Edward Winter wrote:

We believe that 'Magnus Smith Trap' is a misnomer, although in the Sicilian Defence there is a 'Magnus Smith Variation' (a very rare instance of a player's forename and surname being used jointly in openings terminology).

== The trap ==
1. e4 c5 2. Nf3 d6 3. d4 cxd4 4. Nxd4 Nf6 5. Nc3 Nc6 6. Bc4

This is the Sozin Variation (or Fischer–Sozin Attack) of the Sicilian Defense. A common response is 6...e6, to make White's bishop on c4 "bite on granite".

6... g6?!

Black falls into the trap.

7. Nxc6 bxc6 8. e5! (diagram)

Black is in a bad way. After 8...Nh5?, Bobby Fischer gives 9.Qf3! e6 (9...d5 10.Nxd5!) 10.g4 Ng7 11.Ne4 Qa5+ (11...d5 12.Nf6+ Ke7 13.Qa3+) 12.Bd2 Qxe5 13.Bc3 and Black's queen is trapped. Preferable alternatives are 8...Ng4 9.e6 f5, and Black eventually managed to draw in Schlechter–Lasker, World Championship (1910), rd. 7, and 8...d5 9.exf6 dxc4 10.Qxd8+ Kxd8 11.Bg5 Be6 12.0-0-0+ Ke8, and Black ultimately even won in Rosen–Burn, Paris 1900.

The move Black actually chooses leads to instant disaster.

8... dxe5??

"Correct is 8...Ng4." — Fischer. White was clearly better in Suetin–Makarichev, Moscow 1983, after [8...Ng4] 9.Bf4 Bh6 (Sosonko; if 9...Qb6 then 10.Qf3+/−) 10.Bxh6 Nxh6 11.Qd2 Nf5 12.exd6 Nxd6 (if 12...Qxd6 then 13.0-0-0+/−; if 12...exd6 then 13.0-0-0 0-0 14.g4! Ne7 15.Qxd6 Qxd6 16.Rxd6 Bxg4 17.Re1!+/− Makarichev) 13.0-0-0 Qc7 (if 13...Bb7!? then 14.Qf4 intending Ne4; Makarichev) 14.Qf4 0-0 15.Ne4 (Nunn).

9. Bxf7+ +−

White wins Black's queen after 9...Kxf7 10.Qxd8.
