= Josip Rukavina =

Croatian chess player (born 1942)

Personal information
- Born: October 29, 1942 (age 83)

Chess career
- Country: Croatia
- Title: International Master (1972)
- Peak rating: 2510 (July 1985)

Josip Rukavina (born October 29, 1942) is a Croatian chess International Master. He played in the June 1973 Leningrad Interzonal tournament, intended to select a challenger to Bobby Fischer for the World Chess Championship 1975. Rukavina finished fifteenth out of eighteen players in total. Among his games in this tournament was one that he won against Viktor Korchnoi, who previously had a one-point lead, but subsequently ended up finishing the tournament tied with Anatoly Karpov. He also lost a game in the same tournament to Jan Smejkal.
