= Isidore Gordon Ascher =

British writer (1835–1914)

Isidore Gordon Gottschalk Ascher (1835 – September 19, 1914) was a Scottish-Canadian novelist and poet. He was born in Glasgow in 1835, the eldest son of Isaac Gottschalk Ascher and brother to Jacob Ascher. His family moved to Canada in 1841, and Isidore received his education at Montreal High School then attended McGill University, where he graduated in law. He was called to the bar in 1862, but returned to England in 1864 and became a novelist and poet.

In 1872, Ascher married Lilly, eldest daughter of Samuel Newman. He died in London on September 19, 1914.

Isidore was one of the founders of the Young Men's Hebrew Benevolent Society when it was established in 1863 in Montreal. This society later became the Baron de Hirsch Institute and Benevolent Society.

One of his early works, Voices From The Hearth, was published in Montreal in 1863, prior to his move to England, and received some praise:

Though not without occasional defects, which seem more the result of carelessness than of inability to do better, this volume reveals a subtle and delicate imagination, earnest and tender aspirations after the beautiful and the true, and, in several pieces, a rich musical harmony, which is full of promise of higher achievement in future, should Mr. Ascher continue to work the vein he has so auspiciously opened.

His novel An Odd Man's Story is the tale story of a man who was duped by a rascal of a brother aided by a weak wife. There is no special reason for the tale, though it opens in a manner which seems to promise something a little out of the common.

== Works ==
=== Fiction ===
- An Odd Man's Story. London: Elliott Stock, London, 1889. British Library, Historical Print Editions, 2010. ISBN 978-1-241-17614-3 ISBN 1241176140
- The Doom Of Destiny. London: Diprose & Bateman, 1895.
- A Social Upheaval. London: Greening & Co., 1898.

=== Drama ===
- Circumstances Alter Cases. London, New York: Samuel French, 1888.

=== Poetry ===
- Voices From The Hearth. Montreal/New York: John Lovell, D. Appleton, 1863.
- One Hundred And Five Sonnets. Poetry, 1912
- Collected Poems. Epworth P, 1929.
