= Dallas 1957 chess tournament =

International chess tournament

The Dallas 1957 chess tournament was played in Hotel Adolphus in Dallas, then the tallest building in Texas, from November 30 to December 16, 1957. The main event was a contest among eight players from seven countries. Three Polish-born grandmasters participated; Samuel Reshevsky, Miguel Najdorf and Daniel Yanofsky. David Bronstein from the Soviet Union got no visa for a visit to Texas. Pál Benkő defeated Ken Smith in a match that was played as a side event. The time control was 40 moves in two hours, followed by 20 moves in one hour. A bulletin was published for each round, and Isaac Kashdan functioned as commentator.

== Results ==
The results and standings:

#	Player	Country	1	2	3	4	5	6	7	8	Total
1.	Svetozar Gligorić	Yugoslavia	**	½½	0½	1½	1½	1½	½½	½1	8½
2.	Samuel Reshevsky	United States	½½	**	½½	½½	0½	01	11	11	8½
3	László Szabó	Hungary	1½	½½	**	½½	½½	0½	½½	½1	7½
4	Bent Larsen	Denmark	0½	½½	½½	**	½1	01	01	1½	7½
5	Daniel Yanofsky	Canada	0½	1½	½½	½0	**	01	½½	½1	7
6	Friðrik Ólafsson	Iceland	0½	10	1½	10	10	**	½½	½0	6½
7	Miguel Najdorf	Argentina	½½	00	½½	10	½½	½½	**	½0	5½
8	Larry Evans	United States	½0	00	½0	0½	½0	½1	½1	**	5

Gligorić and Reshevsky got $1750 each, Szabo and Larsen $750 each, Yanofsky $210, Olafsson $195, Najdorf $165, and Evans $150.
