= Daniel Yanofsky =

Canadian chess grandmaster (1925–2000)

- Yanofsky in 1946

Personal information
- Born: Daniel Abraham Yanofsky; March 25, 1925 Brody, Poland (now western Ukraine)
- Died: March 5, 2000 (aged 74) Winnipeg, Manitoba, Canada

Chess career
- Country: Canada
- Title: Grandmaster; International Arbiter
- Peak rating: 2460 (July 1971)

Daniel Abraham "Abe" Yanofsky (March 25, 1925 – March 5, 2000) was a Canadian chess player, chess arbiter, writer, lawyer, and politician. An eight-time Canadian chess champion, Yanofsky was Canada's first grandmaster and the first grandmaster of the British Commonwealth.

== Early life ==
Yanofsky was born to a Jewish family in Brody, Poland (now western Ukraine), and moved to Canada when he was eight months old, settling with his family in Winnipeg.

== Life in chess ==
=== Early successes ===
He learned to play chess at the age of eight. Yanofsky won his first Manitoba provincial championship at age 12 in 1937, also making his debut in the Closed Canadian Chess Championship that same year in Toronto. In 1939, just 14 years old, he played for Canada at the Buenos Aires Olympiad. Yanofsky was the sensation of the tournament, making the highest score on second board. He won his first Canadian Chess Championship in 1941 at age 16, at home in Winnipeg. He won at Ventnor City 1942 with 6.5/9, and tied 1st-2nd with Herman Steiner on 16/17 in the 1942 U.S. Open at Dallas.

=== First Commonwealth GM ===
In 1946, at age 21, Yanofsky entered the first major post-World War II international tournament at Groningen, where he defeated the Soviet champion and tournament winner, Mikhail Botvinnik, winning the brilliancy prize. Over the next two years, he played in several more European events, where his best result was second place behind Miguel Najdorf at Barcelona 1946. Yanofsky represented Canada at the Interzonals held in Saltsjöbaden 1948 and Stockholm 1962. He won the British Championship in 1953. At Dallas 1957, Yanofsky achieved his first grandmaster norm with wins over Samuel Reshevsky, Friðrik Ólafsson and Larry Evans. His performance at the Tel Aviv 1964 Olympiad earned him his second grandmaster norm and the title, thereby becoming the first grandmaster of the British Commonwealth.

=== Canadian champion ===
Yanofsky, winner in 1941, repeated as Canadian champion in 1943, 1945, 1947, 1953, 1959, 1963, and 1965; his eight titles is a Canadian record (tied with Maurice Fox).

=== Olympiads ===
Yanofsky represented Canada at eleven Olympiads: (Buenos Aires 1939, 2nd board, {13.5/16}, Amsterdam 1954 1st board, {9/17}, Munich 1958, 1st board, {5.5/11}, Tel Aviv 1964, 1st board, {10/16}, Havana 1966, 1st board, {3.5/5}, Lugano 1968, 1st board, {6/14}, Siegen 1970, 1st board, {7/14}, Skopje 1972, 2nd board, {6/13}, Nice 1974, 3rd board, {7/14}, Haifa 1976, 3rd board, {3.5/10}, and La Valletta 1980), 3rd board, {6/11}). His Olympiad totals are: +50 =54 -37, for 54.6 percent. His record of Olympiad appearances is surpassed among Canadians only by International Master Lawrence Day (13). His total of 141 games played is the Canadian record among men, and second only to Nava Starr (147).

=== Further tournament successes ===
Further tournament titles included Arbon 1946 (tied with Karel Opocensky and Ludek Pachman), Reykjavík 1947, Hastings 1952-53 (tied with Harry Golombek, Jonathan Penrose, and Antonio Medina), and the Canadian Open Chess Championship 1979 (Edmonton). Yanofsky placed second at Hastings 1951-52 behind Svetozar Gligorić and second at Netanya 1968 behind Bobby Fischer.

=== Later years ===
A central figure in the Winnipeg chess scene, Yanofsky organized Canada's first international grandmaster tournament in Winnipeg in 1967 to mark Canada's Centennial. He also played in the tournament and was awarded the brilliancy prize for his victory over László Szabó; the event was jointly won by Bent Larsen and Klaus Darga. In 1974, Yanofsky also brought to Winnipeg the Pan American Chess Championship that was won by Walter Browne.

Yanofsky earned the FIDE International Arbiter title in 1977.

He played in his final Canadian championship in 1986 at age 61 at home in Winnipeg, and qualified for another Interzonal appearance by placing tied for 3rd-4th with 9.5/15, but ceded the seat in favour of Denis Allan, a younger player.

Yanofsky returned to Groningen in 1996 for the 50th anniversary tournament among the 1946 event's seven surviving players; former world champion Vassily Smyslov won.

== Chess style ==
According to Golombek's Encyclopedia of Chess, Yanofsky was known for his expertise in the French Defence and the Ruy Lopez, but his strongpoint was his endgame play. Samuel Reshevsky, who played against Yanofsky on a number of occasions, said that he was a tough opponent. ''His style is defensive but quite accurate,'' he wrote. ''When given the slightest opportunity, he is strong enough to beat the best.''

== Education and legal career ==
Except from 1946 to 1947, Yanofsky never pursued chess full-time.

He entered the University of Manitoba in 1941, earning a science degree in 1944.

He served in the Royal Canadian Navy during World War II (1944–46).

Yanofsky graduated with a law degree from the University of Manitoba in 1951. He won several scholarships, which allowed him to pursue legal studies at Oxford University (1951–53). Following graduation, he practiced law in Winnipeg with his brother Harry, who was also a chess master. Yanofsky argued several cases before the Supreme Court of Canada.

== Politics ==
Yanofsky was an alderman, then mayor of the Winnipeg suburb of West Kildonan from 1969 to 1971, and served on the Winnipeg city council from 1971 to 1986, chairing the finance committee.

He campaigned for the Legislative Assembly of Manitoba in the 1959 provincial election as a candidate of the Liberal-Progressive Party. He finished third behind David Orlikow of the Co-operative Commonwealth Federation in the St. Johns constituency.

Yanofsky played a major role in the building of the Seven Oaks General Hospital and the Wellness Institute in the city's north end.

== Honours ==
In 1972, Yanofsky was made an Officer of the Order of Canada. In 1980, he was appointed a Queen's Counsel. In 2000, he was inducted as a charter member of the Canadian Chess Hall of Fame.

Following Yanofsky's death in 2000, a memorial tournament has been held annually in Winnipeg in recognition of his contributions to Canadian chess.

Yanofsky was married to Hilda (née Gutnik); they had four children.

== Publications ==
- Chess the Hard Way! 1st edition (1953), 2nd edition (2000)
- Chess Championship of Canada (1953) (with Nathan Divinsky)
- How to Win End-Games (1953)
- 1st Canadian Open Chess Championship, Montreal 1956 (1956)
- Canadian Centennial Grand Masters Chess Tournament, Winnipeg 1967 (1967)
- 100 Years of Chess in Canada: A Centennial Project of the Chess Federation of Canada (1967)
- International Chess Tournament, Netanya, 1969 (1969) (with M.H. Horton)
- The Games of D.A.Yanofsky (1985) (with David Ross)
- The Games of Daniel "Abe" Yanofsky (1997) (compiled by J. Ken MacDonald)
- Editor, Canadian Chess Chat, 1956-59
- Chess columnist, Winnipeg Free Press, 1954-81

== Notable chess games ==
- Daniel Yanofsky vs Alberto Ismodes, Buenos Aires Olympiad 1939, French, Classical (C11), 1-0 The 14-year-old unleashes a rook sacrifice against the Peruvian master in a game that won praise from World Champion Alexander Alekhine.
- Daniel Yanofsky vs Mikhail Botvinnik, Groningen 1946, Ruy Lopez, Closed, Chigorin (C99), 1-0 In this classic game, the young Canadian stuns the Soviet champion and Groningen event winner.
- Viacheslav Ragozin vs Daniel Yanofsky, Saltsjobaden Interzonal 1948, French, Classical (C13), 0-1 Yanofsky coolly gives up his queen to forestall the Soviet GM's dangerous attacking chances.
- Samuel Reshevsky vs Daniel Yanofsky, Tel Aviv Olympiad 1964, Grunfeld (D93), 0-1 Yanofsky sacrifices a piece to entomb White's bishop and ruin his pawn structure, leading to a strategical masterpiece.
- Laszlo Szabo vs Daniel Yanofsky, Winnipeg 1967, King's Indian (E70), 0-1 A thematic dark-square King's Indian game which won the brilliancy prize.
