= Nicholas MacLeod =

Canadian chess player

Nicholas Menalaus MacLeod (8 February 1870 – 27 September 1965) was a Canadian chess master.

== Biography ==
Nicholas Menalaus MacLeod was born in Quebec on 8 February 1870.

MacLeod won the Canadian Chess Championship in 1886 and 1888 and shared first but lost a play-off match for the title in 1887. He finished last out of 20 players at the sixth American Chess Congress held in New York in 1889, won by Max Weiss and Mikhail Chigorin. MacLeod lost a world-record 31 games while winning six and drawing one.

He was the only player to beat Emanuel Lasker in an 18-board simultaneous exhibition in Quebec City on November 26, 1892. Lasker won 15, drew two, and lost the one game to MacLeod.

He moved to Minnesota in 1896, and won the second Western Chess Association Tournament (later called the U.S. Open Chess Championship) held at Excelsior, Minnesota in 1901. He moved to Spokane around 1903.

MacLeod died in Spokane, Washington on 27 September 1965.
