= Eric Hansen (chess player) =

Canadian chess grandmaster (born 1992)

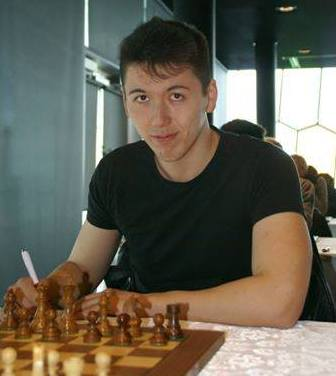
- Hansen in 2014 during the Reykjavik Open

Personal information
- Born: May 24, 1992 (age 34) Irvine, California, U.S.
- Education: University of Texas at Dallas

Chess career
- Country: Canada
- Title: Grandmaster (2013)
- FIDE rating: 2609 (August 2026)
- Peak rating: 2629 (September 2017)

Eric Hansen (born May 24, 1992) is an American-born Canadian chess grandmaster and Twitch streamer. FIDE awarded him the grandmaster title in 2013. He competed in the FIDE World Cup in 2011 and 2013. Hansen has represented Canada in the Chess Olympiad.

== Biography ==
Hansen holds a dual citizenship as a Canadian and American. Hansen was born in Irvine, California, but grew up in Calgary, Alberta. He first attended elementary school at Webber Academy where his chess roots formed a solid foundation during school chess club.

In a March 2016 interview with La Presse, Hansen said he was diagnosed with attention deficit hyperactivity disorder (ADHD) when he was 8 or 9 years old. In a 2015 article by sportsnet, Hansen said he was prescribed Ritalin temporarily and enrolled in a school for children with learning disabilities.

Hansen attended the University of Texas at Dallas for one year, beginning in September 2011, on a chess scholarship, representing the school in intercollegiate tournaments. He took a break from his studies to focus on chess full-time, and made his European base in Valencia, Spain, in autumn 2013.

== Chess career ==
Eric began playing chess in grade school at age nine. By 15, he became the youngest ever Alberta champion and earned the title FIDE Master (FM). He became Alberta champion again in 2009, 2011, and 2013.

In 2011, Hansen tied for first place in the Canadian Closed Championship with a score of 7½/9 points, but lost a two-game playoff to Bator Sambuev, who was declared champion. Nevertheless, Hansen was nominated to play in the FIDE World Cup 2011. In that event, Hansen played Vugar Gashimov, losing both games. In a 4 September 2012 video interview at the Chess Olympiad in Istanbul, Hansen reflected on his 2011 World Cup experience: "I got paired against Gashimov and he killed me. It was a good experience because I realized I wasn't serious enough to be competing with these guys. I'm more serious now ... it was good for motivating me."

Hansen won the Canadian Open Chess Championship in Victoria, British Columbia, in July 2012. The next month, he tied for fifth place in the World Junior Chess Championship in Athens, Greece, scoring 9/13 points, the best-ever finish by a Canadian in this event; the previous best had been Vinny Puri's tie for 8th place in 1988. At the Isthmia Open tournament at Vrachati a few days later, Hansen scored his first Grandmaster norm with a tie for 1st–3rd place.

Hansen achieved his final Grandmaster norm in the 40th Chess Olympiad, in Istanbul, Turkey, in August–September 2012, where he made his debut on the Canadian national team. He played on board four and scored 7½/10 points, boosting his FIDE rating by 25 points, reaching 2500 (the minimum for the GM title). Hansen is the second-youngest Canadian to attain the title of Grandmaster, after Mark Bluvshtein, who did so at age 16 in 2004, and the youngest homegrown Canadian (because Bluvshtein received Israeli youth chess training systems before immigrating to Canada in 1999 at age 11). FIDE awarded him the title in January 2013.

Hansen tied for first place at the October 2012 American Continental Championship in Mar del Plata, Argentina, with Julio Granda Zuñiga, Alexander Shabalov, Diego Flores, and Gregory Kaidanov. Since there were four qualifying places for the 2013 World Cup, Hansen played a rapidplay playoff with the other four, finishing fourth. In December, he won the 2nd Panama Open, scoring 8½/9.

In early 2013, Hansen tied for first place at the Cappelle-la-Grande Open in France. In July he shared first place in the Canadian Open in Ottawa with Nigel Short, with both scoring 7½/9.

In the 2015 Canadian Zonal Championship, Hansen shared first place with Leonid Gerzhoy and Tomas Krnan, who was declared the winner on tiebreak.

In the online tournament Airthings Masters in February 2022, Hansen defeated both Magnus Carlsen and Ian Nepomniachtchi in the preliminary rounds and qualified for the knockout phase.

== Online chess and streaming ==
Hansen is predominantly a blitz and bullet player, both over-the-board and online. He has played at Internet Chess Club (ICC), Chess.com, ChessCube, PlayChess.com, and lichess.org. For most of 2011, Hansen was recognized as the highest-rated player on ChessCube.com, with a 3000+ rating. By April 2012, he was recognized as the highest-rated bullet player on Chess.com. He subsequently qualified for and accepted Chess.com's Death-Match 4 against then-IM Conrad Holt, who had the highest blitz rating. The two were living in the same dorm on the University of Texas at Dallas campus at the time. Holt won the match 15-11.

Hansen is the main host of the "Chessbrah" chess channel on Twitch along with GM Aman Hambleton. The channel occasionally features other "brahs", most of whom are titled players, such as GM Magnus Carlsen, GM Yasser Seirawan, GM Robin van Kampen, GM Aryan Tari, FM Lefong Hua, Elias Oussedik, Omid Malek, and Eric Kurtz. Stream highlights are often later posted on a YouTube account with the same name as the Twitch channel. As of September 2024, each channel has about 330,000 followers/subscribers.

In April 2021, the Chessbrah YouTube channel received copyright strikes from a multi-channel network acting on behalf of fellow Grandmaster and streamer Hikaru Nakamura, leading Hansen to criticise Nakamura for the strikes and for his past behaviour in the broader chess community. Nakamura publicly apologized and retracted the copyright strikes, indicating he would take a more active role in the management of his content and business.
