= Lefong Hua =

Canadian chess player (born 1982)

Personal information
- Born: March 7, 1982 (age 44) Montreal, Quebec, Canada

Chess career
- Country: Canada
- Title: FIDE Master (2004)
- Peak rating: 2333 (December 2016)

Twitch information
- Channel: LefongHua
- Followers: 27,200
- Last updated: September 17, 2025

Lefong Hua is a Canadian chess player, coach, and Twitch streamer.

== Chess career ==
Hua began playing chess at the age of 6, and was coached by Richard Bérubé.

In 1992, Hua finished in 5th place in the World Youth Chess Championship alongside Levon Aronian, Alexander Grischuk, and Étienne Bacrot.

Hua is a 10-time winner of the Quebec Chess Challenge and an 8-time winner of the Canadian Chess Challenge.

In addition to his Twitch channel, LefongHua, Hua is a featured member of the "Chessbrah" chess channel on Twitch, hosted by grandmasters Eric Hansen and Aman Hambleton. The tongue-in-cheek chess term "Lefong" or "Lefonged" is named after him, which is a gambit that aims to catch an opponent pre-moving a bishop fianchetto in the opening, typically in games with very short time controls.

"Lefong"

Position: a8 black rook, b8 black knight, c8 black bishop, d8 black queen, e8 black king, f8 black bishop, g8 black knight, h8 black rook, a7 black pawn, b7 black pawn, c7 black pawn, d7 black pawn, e7 black pawn, f7 black pawn, h7 black pawn, g6 black pawn, h6 white bishop, d4 white pawn, a2 white pawn, b2 white pawn, c2 white pawn, e2 white pawn, f2 white pawn, g2 white pawn, h2 white pawn, a1 white rook, b1 white knight, d1 white queen, e1 white king, f1 white bishop, g1 white knight, h1 white rook

In online chess with bullet time controls, White could play 2. Bh6?? (pictured) and hope that Black would have pre-moved 2...Bg7??, thus hanging their bishop on g7 and their rook on h8 would also be trapped.

== Coaching ==
Hua is a chess coach and runs a chess club. He has been the captain of the Quebec chess team since 2006, and he has trained many promising Canadian chess players, including Shawn Rodrigue-Lemieux and Maili-Jade Ouellet.
