= Jacob Ascher =

British-Canadian chess player

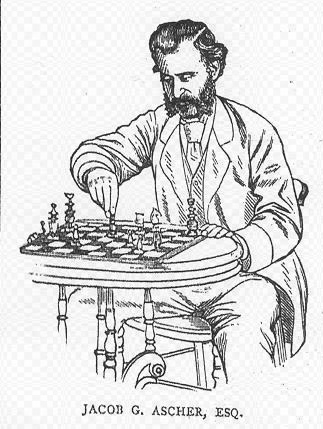

Jacob Gottschalk Ascher (18 February 1841 in Plymouth, England – 12 October 1912 in New York City, United States) was a British–Canadian chess master. He was the son of Isaac Gottschalk Ascher, and brother to Isidor, Albert, Hyman, and Eva.

Ascher twice won the Canadian Chess Championship; the 6th CAN-ch at Montreal 1878/79, and (tied for first) the 10th CAN-ch at Montreal 1882/83. He defeated George Henry Mackenzie at Montreal in one of fourteen simultaneous games played by Mackenzie on 14 January 1879.

He was a chess columnist at New Dominion Monthly published in Montreal. He was Editor of the Montreal Star and was president of the Young Men's Hebrew Association of Montreal, the first Jewish charitable organization in Canada.

Ascher died in New York on 12 October 1912.
