= Miguel Alemán (chess player) =

Cuban chess player

Personal information
- Born: 3 February 1906
- Died: 27 December 1979 (aged 73)

Chess career
- Country: Cuba

Miguel Blas Alemán Dovo (3 February 1906 – 27 December 1979) was a Cuban chess player, Cuban Chess Championship winner (1939).

From the late 1930s to the early 1950s, Miguel Alemán was one of the leading Cuban chess players. He won the Cuban Chess Championship in 1939. Miguel Alemán also participated in U.S. Open Chess Championship (1946, 1947) and a strong International Chess Tournament in Havana (1952). In 1948, he was added to the extended reserve list for the Interzonal tournament.

Miguel Alemán played for Cuba in the Chess Olympiads:

- In 1939, at third board in the 8th Chess Olympiad in Buenos Aires (+5, =4, -10),
- In 1952, at first board in the 10th Chess Olympiad in Helsinki (+2, =5, -4).
