= Bator Sambuev =

Russian-Canadian chess grandmaster (born 1980)

Personal information
- Born: November 25, 1980 (age 45) Ulan-Ude, RSFSR, Soviet Union

Chess career
- Country: Russia (until 2010); Canada (since 2010)
- Title: Grandmaster (2006)
- FIDE rating: 2420 (July 2026)
- Peak rating: 2571 (April 2014)

Bator Sambuev (Russian: Батор Самбуев; born November 25, 1980) is a Russian-Canadian chess player who holds the FIDE title of Grandmaster. He is a four-time winner of the Canadian chess championship and has represented Canada twice at Chess Olympiads.

== Chess biography ==
Born in Ulan-Ude, Russia, Sambuev was awarded by FIDE the titles of International Master in 1999 and Grandmaster in 2006. He immigrated to Toronto, Canada, in June 2007 and moved to Montreal in 2010.

He won the Canadian Closed Championship in 2011 after a two-game playoff against Eric Hansen. In 2012, Sambuev again won the championship, earning the right to participate in the FIDE World Cup 2013, where he played Alexander Morozevich in the first round. Sambuev won the first game but lost the second and was eliminated after losing the rapid-play playoff (1½-½).

Sambuev has been a team member at two Olympiads:

- Istanbul 2012: 1st board (+3, -6)
- Tromsø 2014: 4th board (+5, =2, -3)

Sambuev won the 2017 Canadian Championship (Zonal 2.2) in Montreal. He finished =1st with IM Nikolay Noritsyn in the 9-round Swiss with 8/9. They played four rapid games (15m + 10s) with White winning each time. Sambuev then won a controversial blitz playoff (1.5/0.5). In it, Sambuev kept Noritsyn's queen in his hand after capturing it. During a time scramble, Noritsyn used an upside-down rook when he promoted to a queen (as there was no extra queen on the table). The arbiters, mistakenly believing that the queen had been on the table, ruled that the promotion had been to a rook rather than a queen, leading to a win for Sambuev. After the match, Noritsyn appealed to the Chess Federation of Canada, but the appeal was denied.

Sambuev played in the 2017 World Cup at Tbilisi where he was eliminated in the first round by Wei Yi.

He was =1st at the 2023 Canadian championship, with Nikolay Noritsyn and Shawn Rodrigue-Lemieux.

Sambuev has frequently been the victor or the runner-up at Swiss tournaments in Canada and has been the top-rated Canadian player.
