= Anna Kantane =

Polish chess player (born 1995)

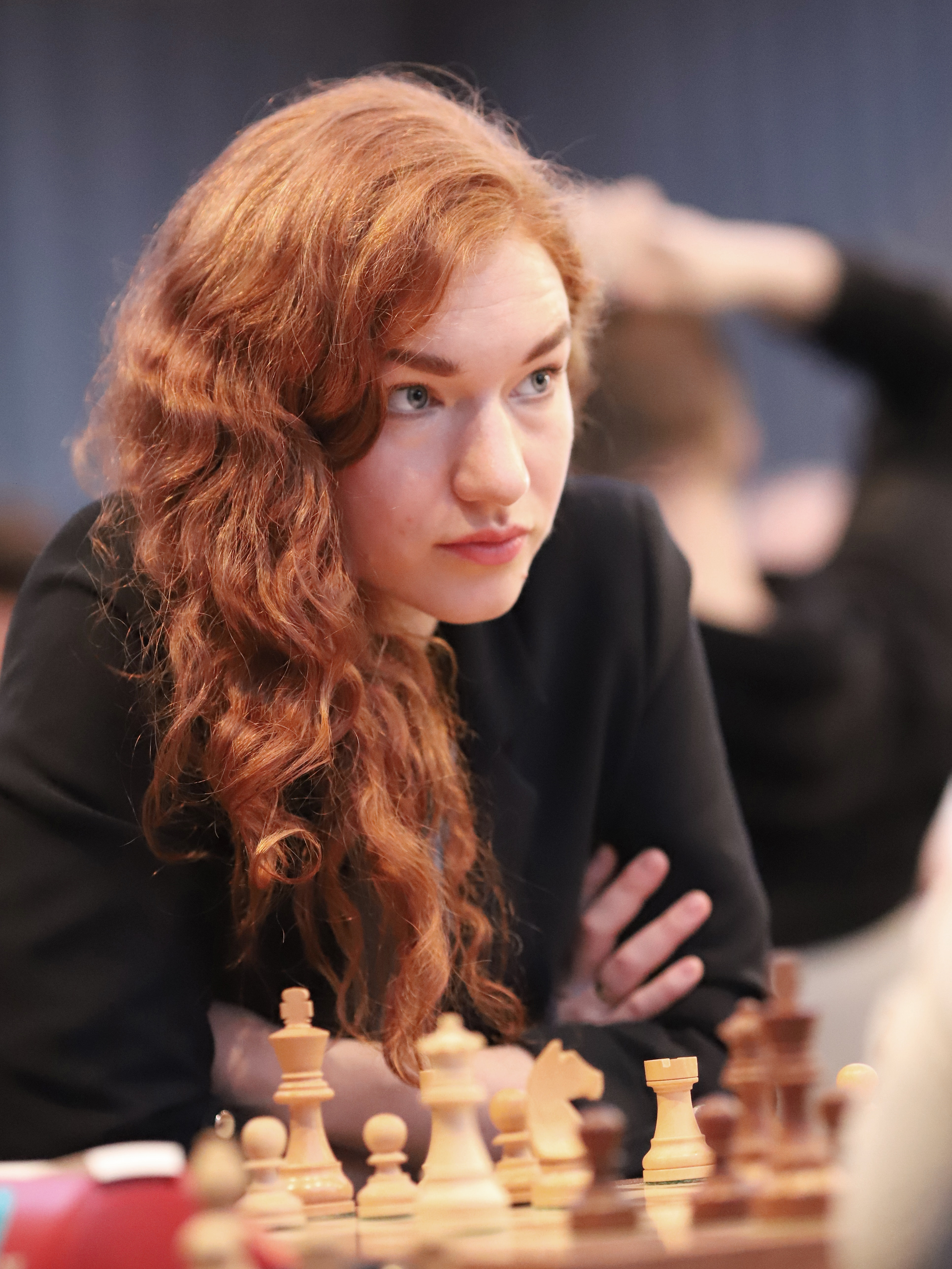
- Kantane in 2022

Personal information
- Born: 7 April 1995 (age 31) Wrocław, Poland
- Spouse: Toms Kantāns (m. 2015)

Chess career
- Country: Poland
- Title: Woman International Master (2012)
- FIDE rating: 2252 (February 2020)
- Peak rating: 2333 (July 2016)

Anna Kantane (née Iwanow; born 7 April 1995) is a Polish chess player who holds the FIDE title of Woman International Master (WIM, 2012).

== Biography ==
Kantane was very early in achieving significant success in chess tournaments. In 2005, she won bronze medal in World Youth Chess Championship in girls U10 age group. In 2007, Kantane won silver medal in Polish Youth Chess Championship and European Youth Chess Championship in girls U12 age group. In 2008, she won Polish Youth Chess Championship in girls U14 age group but in 2011 repeated this success in Polish Youth Chess Championship in girls U16 age group. In 2011, she won Polish Women's Team Chess Championship with Wrocław chess club KSz Polonia Wrocław. In 2012, she won bronze medal in Polish Youth Chess Championship in girls U18 age group. In 2013, in Mariánské Lázně she ranked 2nd in International Chess festival "B" tournament.

Kantane played for Poland team:

- in European Women's Team Chess Championship participated in 2013;
- in European Girls' U18 Team Chess Championship participated in 2013 and won silver medal in team competition and gold medal in individual competition.

In 2012, she awarded the FIDE Woman International Master (WIM) title.

Kantane streams chess gameplay and chess compositions on her Twitch channel, kantannachess.

== Personal life ==
In 2015, Kantane married Latvian chess grandmaster Toms Kantāns (born 1994).
