= Magnus Smith =

Canadian chess player

Magnus Smith (1869–1934) was a three-time Canadian chess champion in 1899, 1904 and 1906.

The Magnus Smith Trap in the Sicilian Defence is named after him.
