= Maurice Fox =

Canadian chess player

- Born: 14 January 1898; Ukraine, Russian Empire
- Died: 25 June 1988 (aged 90); Montreal, Quebec, Canada
- Occupation: Electrical engineer
- Known for: Eight-time Canadian chess champion

Maurice Fox (14 January 1898 in Ukraine, Russian Empire – 25 June 1988 in Montreal) was a Canadian chess master. He won the Canadian Chess Championship eight times, and is tied for the most Canadian titles with Abe Yanofsky.

== Biography ==
At the end of 1898, Fox's family escaped from a series of pogroms in the small town in Ukraine, where he had just been born, to London, England. After graduating from the University of London in 1921, he emigrated to Canada in 1923. The following year, Fox took second, behind John Morrison, at the Canadian Chess Championship in Hamilton. In 1926, he took second in the Canadian Chess Championship held in Montreal. He was Canadian champion in 1927, 1929, 1931 (after a playoff), 1932, 1935, 1938, 1940 and 1949. He also played in several United States Opens.

In 1928 and 1929, he won the Montreal City Championship. In 1929, he took 5th in Bradley Beach, New Jersey; world champion Alexander Alekhine won. In 1930, Fox won the Montreal Chess Club Summer tournament. In 1931, he took 12th in New York City (José Raúl Capablanca won). In 1933, he took 9th in Detroit (US Open); the event was won by Reuben Fine. In 1935, he won the First Montreal Speed Championship, Montreal City Championship, and Canadian Chess Championship held at Sun Life. In 1936, he took 2nd, behind Boris Blumin in Toronto at the Canadian Championship. At the 1936 US Open, he took 2nd, behind Arthur Dake in the preliminaries and tied for 8–10th (finals) in Philadelphia. The event was won by I.A. Horowitz.

In 1937, Fox took second in Quebec City (Canadian championship, Boris Blumin won). He won the Canadian Championship at Toronto 1938 and in Montreal 1940. His last championship win was in 1949 at Arvida, Quebec, ahead of Yanofsky and Fedor Bohatirchuk. In 1945, Fox beat Morrison on board 1 in a telegraph match Toronto vs Montreal. In 1954, he played for Canada at first reserve board in the 11th Chess Olympiad in Amsterdam (+5 –2 =1). At age 58, Fox beat the 13-year-old prodigy, Bobby Fischer, at the 1956 Canadian Open Chess Championship in Montreal.

In a 1973 interview, Fox indicated he had learned chess at 14 when a brother brought home a chess set. His brilliance soon became apparent. While still in London, he was the only player to defeat Capablanca in a simultaneous exhibition (see Notable Games below). "I never took a lesson in my life," said Fox. "In fact, it was much later, after I entered tournaments with top players, that I even looked into a chess book."

His specialty was the Scotch Opening. "I liked the Scotch because it is an aggressive, more reckless style of play," he said. "I hated to get piled up in a defensive game. I liked action."

Blind in his left eye from childhood, Fox's deteriorating eyesight affected his ability to play competitive chess in later years. Nevertheless, at 80, he played in the Quebec Open, losing only to Kevin Spraggett.

Fox never pursued a chess career, but worked as an electrical engineer with Bell and later with the standards branch of the federal government. He married his wife Sylvia in 1928, with whom he had two children.

In 2000, Fox was posthumously inducted into the Canadian Chess Hall of Fame.

== Notable games ==
- José Raúl Capablanca vs Maurice Fox, London 1919, Simultaneous Exhibition, Vienna Game, Anderssen Defense, C25, 0-1
- Alexander Alekhine vs Maurice Fox, Toronto 1924, French Defense, Exchange, Svenonius Variation, C01, 1/2-1/2
- Bobby Fischer vs Maurice Fox, Montreal 1956, Canadian Open, Zukertort Opening, Symmetrical Variation, A05, 0-1
