= Boris Blumin =

Canadian-American chess player

Boris Blumin (January 11, 1908 [December 29, 1907 O. S.], Saint Petersburg – February 16, 1998, Trenton, New Jersey) was a Canadian-American chess master.

Born in Russia, he emigrated to Canada, where he played in several chess championships. He took 9th at Toronto 1927 (CAN-ch, Maurice Fox won); took 4th at Montreal 1929 (Fox won); tied for 3rd-4th at Toronto 1934 (John Belson won); took 3rd at Montreal 1935 (Fox won). Blumin was twice Champion of Canada winning at Toronto 1936 and Quebec 1937. He tied for 3rd-4th, behind Israel Albert Horowitz and Isaac Kashdan, at Boston 1938 (U.S. Open).

He was a five-time winner of the Montreal City Championship (1933–1939). In August 1939, he moved to New York City, where he took 11th at the U.S. Open (Reuben Fine won).

He won the Hamilton Chess Club Championship at New Jersey in 1986. He died in his home on Terrapin Lane. He was suffering from Alzheimers with his wife and son by his side.
