= John Morrison (chess player) =

Canadian chess player

John Stuart Morrison
- Born: 7 December 1889; Toronto
- Died: 1 March 1975 (aged 85); Toronto
- Known for: Five-time Canadian chess champion

John Stuart Morrison (1889-1975) was a chess master who won the Canadian Championship five times between 1910 and 1926. He represented Canada at the 1939 Buenos Aires Olympiad and played in several international tournaments that were won by José Raúl Capablanca.

== Biography ==
Born in Toronto, Morrison grew up in the city's west end. He discovered chess through books in 1907 and was mentored in the game at lunchtime at the Toronto Engraving Co. by Alfred Hunter, a co-worker and Toronto chess club member. At 19, Morrison won his first Toronto championship, a feat he repeated in 1945.

Morrison won the Canadian Championship five times (1910, 1913, 1922, 1924, and 1926) and shared first place in 1931 (Maurice Fox won the playoff). He took twelfth place at New York City 1913, seventh place at New York 1918, and equal 14th place at London 1922; all three tournaments were won by Capablanca.

Morrison played first board (+5 –6 =4) on the Canadian team at the 8th Chess Olympiad at Buenos Aires 1939.

In 2000, he was inducted posthumously into the Canadian Chess Hall of Fame.

A number of Morrison's games are published in chess books, including Capablanca's Chess Fundamentals.
