= List of Canadian Chess Championship winners =

This is the list of all the winners of the Canadian Chess Championship, often referred to as the Canadian Closed Championship to distinguish it from the annual Canadian Open tournament. The winner of the Canadian Closed advances to the World Cup stage of the FIDE World Chess Championship cycle. Winners on tiebreak or a playoff match are noted with an asterisk beside their names.

- 1872 tournament not completed
- 1873 Albert Ensor
- 1874 William Hicks
- 1875 George Jackson
- 1876 Edward Sanderson
- 1877 Henry Howe
- 1878 Jacob Ascher
- 1879 Edwin Pope
- 1881 Joseph Shaw
- 1882 Edward Sanderson
- 1883 Jacob Ascher, Henry Howe
- 1884 François-Xavier Lambert
- 1886 Nicholas MacLeod
- 1887 George Barry *, Nicholas MacLeod
- 1888 Nicholas MacLeod *, James Narraway, Edwin Pope
- 1889 Richard Fleming *, James Narraway
- 1890 Robert Short
- 1891 A. Thomas Davison
- 1892 William Boultbee
- 1893 James Narraway
- 1894 A. Thomas Davison
- 1897 James Narraway
- 1898 James Narraway
- 1899 Magnus Smith
- 1904 Magnus Smith
- 1906 Magnus Smith
- 1908 Joseph Sawyer
- 1910 John Morrison
- 1913 John Morrison *, Charles Blake
- 1920 Sydney Gale *, John Harvey
- 1922 John Morrison
- 1924 John Morrison
- 1926 John Morrison
- 1927 Maurice Fox
- 1929 Maurice Fox
- 1931 Maurice Fox *, John Morrison, George Eastman
- 1932 Maurice Fox
- 1933 Robert Martin
- 1934 John Belson
- 1935 Maurice Fox
- 1936 Boris Blumin
- 1937 Boris Blumin
- 1938 Maurice Fox
- 1940 Maurice Fox
- 1941 Daniel Yanofsky
- 1943 Daniel Yanofsky
- 1945 Daniel Yanofsky, Frank Yerhoff
- 1946 John Belson
- 1947 Daniel Yanofsky
- 1949 Maurice Fox
- 1951 Povilas Vaitonis
- 1953 Frank Anderson, Daniel Yanofsky
- 1955 Frank Anderson
- 1957 Povilas Vaitonis
- 1959 Daniel Yanofsky
- 1961 Lionel Joyner
- 1963 Daniel Yanofsky
- 1965 Daniel Yanofsky
- 1969 Duncan Suttles *, Zvonko Vranesic
- 1972 Peter Biyiasas
- 1975 Peter Biyiasas
- 1978 Jean Hébert
- 1981 Igor V. Ivanov
- 1984 Kevin Spraggett
- 1985 Raymond Stone*, Igor V. Ivanov
- 1986 Igor V. Ivanov, Kevin Spraggett
- 1987 Igor V. Ivanov
- 1989 Kevin Spraggett
- 1991 Lawrence Day
- 1992 Alexandre Le Siège
- 1994 Kevin Spraggett
- 1995 Ron Livshits *, François Léveillé, Bryon Nickoloff
- 1996 Kevin Spraggett
- 1999 Alexandre Le Siège
- 2001 Alexandre Le Siège *, Kevin Spraggett
- 2002 Pascal Charbonneau *, Kevin Spraggett
- 2004 Pascal Charbonneau *, Eric Lawson
- 2006 Igor Zugic
- 2007 Nikolay Noritsyn *, Jean Hébert, Ron Livshits, Artiom Samsonkin
- 2009 Jean Hébert
- 2011 Bator Sambuev *, Eric Hansen
- 2012 Bator Sambuev
- 2015 Tomas Krnan *, Eric Hansen, Leonid Gerzhoy
- 2017 Bator Sambuev *, Nikolay Noritsyn
- 2019 Evgeny Bareev
- 2022 Yuanchen Zhang *, Shawn Rodrigue-Lemieux
- 2023 Nikolay Noritsyn, Shawn Rodrigue-Lemieux, Bator Sambuev
- 2024 Shiyam Thavandiran
- 2025 Nikolay Noritsyn
- 2026 Shawn Rodrigue-Lemieux*, Anthony Atanasov, Sai Krishna G V

== Canadian Women's Championship ==
Winners on tiebreak or a playoff match are noted with an asterisk beside their names.

- 1975 Smilja Vujosevic
- 1978 Nava Sterenberg
- 1981 Nava Sterenberg
- 1984 Nava Sterenberg
- 1986 Nava Sterenberg
- 1989 Nava Sterenberg
- 1991 Nava Starr (née Sterenberg)
- 1995 Nava Starr (née Sterenberg)
- 1996 Johanne Charest
- 2001 Nava Starr (née Sterenberg)
- 2004 Dinara Khaziyeva
- 2006 Natalia Khoudgarian *, Dina Kagramanov
- 2007 Natalia Khoudgarian
- 2009 Dina Kagramanov
- 2011 Natalia Khoudgarian
- 2012 Natalia Khoudgarian
- 2016 Qiyu Zhou
- 2018 Maili-Jade Ouellet
- 2022 Maili-Jade Ouellet
- 2023 Svitlana Demchenko
- 2024 Maili-Jade Ouellet
- 2025 Li Yunshan
- 2026 Maili-Jade Ouellet

== Sources ==
- Cohen, David (2006-08-27). "Canadian Chess Champions". Archived from the original on 2006-11-04.
- Robert Hamilton (November 2006). "Belzberg Canadian Closed Chess Championship". Chess Canada. Chess Federation of Canada. p. 21.
