= Toms Kantāns =

Latvian chess grandmaster (born 1994)

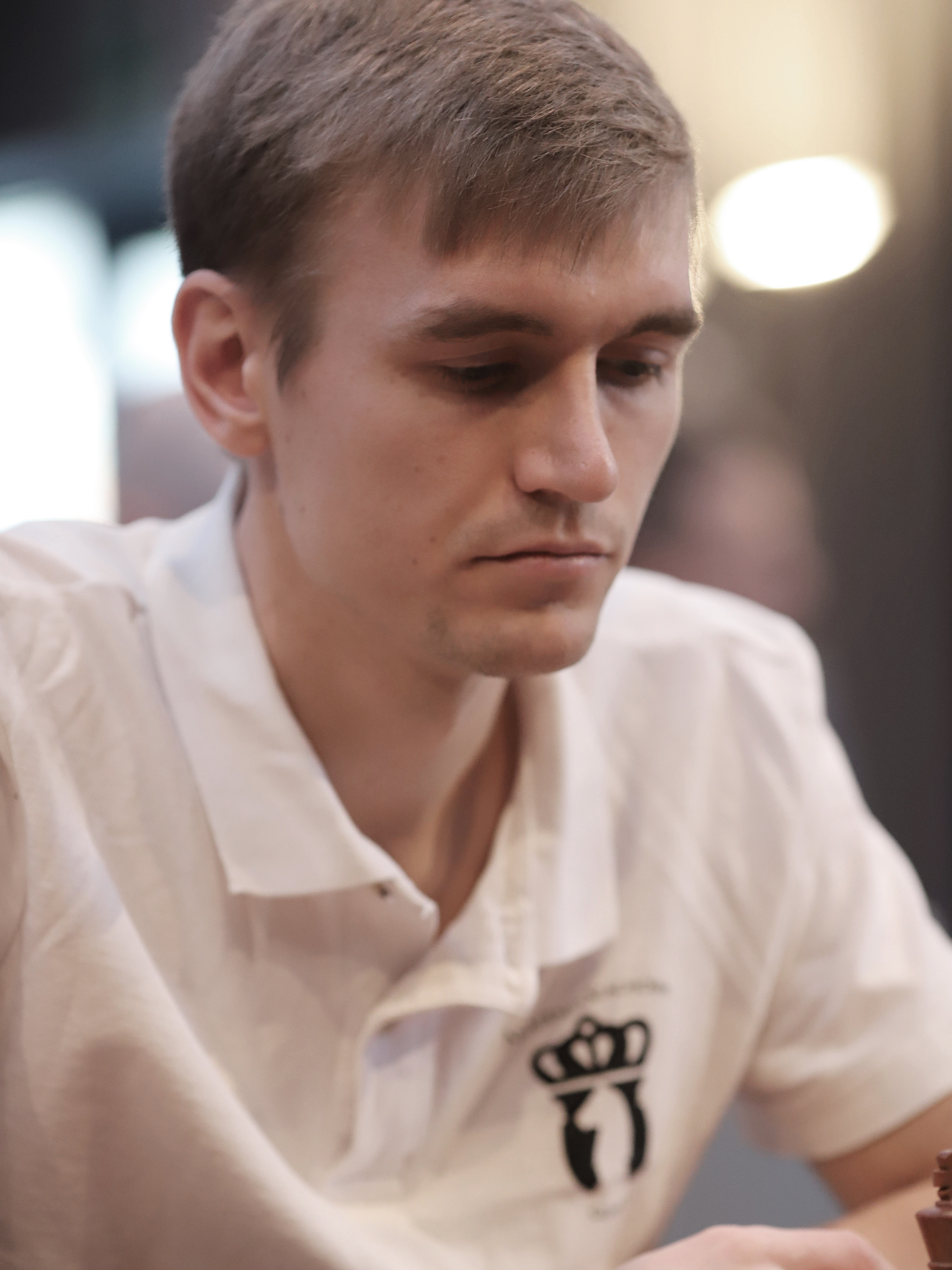
- Kantāns in 2022

Personal information
- Born: 16 January 1994 (age 32) Riga, Latvia
- Spouse: Anna Iwanow (m. 2015)

Chess career
- Country: Latvia
- Title: Grandmaster (2017)
- FIDE rating: 2559 (July 2026)
- Peak rating: 2571 (June 2026)

Toms Kantāns (born 16 January 1994) is a Latvian chess grandmaster (2017), Latvian Chess Championship winner (2023, 2026).

== Biography ==
Kantāns started playing chess at the age of six. He has been a Latvian Youth Chess Champion in different age groups, and regularly participated in the European Youth and World Youth Chess Championships in different age groups. In 2007, he won silver medal in European Union Youth Championship in the U14 age group, but in 2008 in this same tournament won bronze medal. Since 2009, Toms Kantans has regularly participated in the Latvian Chess Championships. Best results – 1st place (2023, 2026) 2nd place (2015, 2017) and 3rd place (2010, 2014). He is multiple winner of Latvian Team Chess Championship with Riga Technical University team (2010, 2012, 2015). In August 2022, Kantāns finished second in the Riga Technical University Open "A" tournament. In June 2023, in Montreal, he won the international chess tournament Canadian Transnational 2023 - Classic Crown.

Kantāns played for Latvia team:

- in Chess Olympiads (2010, 2014, 2018, 2022, 2024);
- in European Team Chess Championship participated in 2015;
- in 2013 Summer Universiade chess tournament.

In 2014, he was awarded the FIDE International Master (IM) title and received the FIDE International Grandmaster (GM) title three years later.

== Personal life ==
In 2015, Kantāns married Polish chess master Anna Iwanow (born 1995).
