= Nava Starr =

Canadian chess player (born 1949)

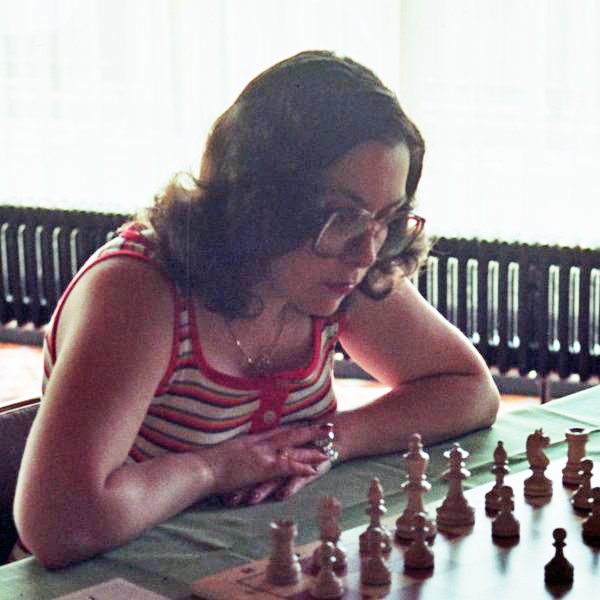
- Starr at Interzonal tournament in Bad Kissingen, 1982

Personal information
- Born: April 4, 1949 (age 77) Riga, Latvia

Chess career
- Country: Canada
- Title: Woman International Master (1978)
- Peak rating: 2220 (January 1990)

Nava Starr (née Shterenberg; born April 4, 1949) is a Canadian chess player. She holds the title of Woman International Master (WIM). Starr is an eight-time Canadian ladies' champion and has represented Canada 13 times in the Women's Chess Olympiad. She competed six times in the Women's World Chess Championship.

== Biography, chess achievements and style ==
Starr was born Nava Shterenberg in Riga, Latvia. She is Jewish. She has lived in Toronto, Ontario, Canada since the mid-1970s. She is married to Sasha Starr; they have a daughter, and two grandchildren. Sasha Starr is also a Master-strength chess player.

Starr's chess style is sharp, offensive and always looking for combinations. She favours sharp and unusual openings, such as the Grand Prix Attack (Sicilian), b2-b3 against the French, ...f7-f5 variations in the Ruy Lopez, and the Philidor Defence. She received the WIM title by winning her first Ladies' Canadian Chess Championship in 1978 in Victoria, British Columbia. The best players she has defeated are Pia Cramling, Milunka Lazarević, Barbara Hund, and Roman Pelts. Starr wrote an article in En Passant magazine titled "Why men are superior to women in chess". She is a member of the Canadian Chess Hall of Fame.

== Major tournament and match results ==
- Represented Canada at 13 Women's Chess Olympiads, 10 times on first board:
  - Haifa 1976, 2nd board, 9/10, +8 =2 −0, won the board gold medal;
  - Buenos Aires 1978, 1st board, 10/14, +8 =4 −2;
  - La Valletta 1980, 1st board, 7.5/11, +5 =5 −1;
  - Lucerne 1982, 1st board, 9/12, +7 =4 −1, won the board bronze medal;
  - Thessaloniki 1984, 1st board, 8/12, +7 =2 −3;
  - Thessaloniki 1988, 1st board, 5/12, +4 =2 −6;
  - Manila 1992, 1st board, 9/13, +7 =4 −2;
  - Moscow 1994, 1st board, 8.5/12, +6 =5 −1;
  - Yerevan 1996, 1st board, 6/12, +3 =6 −3;
  - Bled 2002 1st board, 5.5/11, +5 =1 −5;
  - Calvià 2004, 1st board, 8.5/12, +7 =3 −2;
  - Turin 2006, 2nd board, 5.5/10, +4 =3 −3;
  - Tromso 2014, reserve board, 2.5/6, +2 =1 -3.

Totals in Olympiad play for Canada: 147 games (all-time Canadian record, for women and men), +73 =42 −29, for 63.9 per cent.

- 6-time participant in the Women's World Championships:
  - 1978 – Alicante, Spain
  - 1982 – Bad Kissingen, Germany
  - 1985 – Havana, Cuba
  - 1990 – Kuala Lumpur, Malaysia
  - 1993 – Jakarta, Indonesia
  - 2001 – Moscow
