= Maili-Jade Ouellet =

Canadian chess player (born 2002)

Personal information
- Born: May 29, 2002 (age 24) Saint-Lambert, Quebec, Canada

Chess career
- Country: Canada
- Title: Woman Grandmaster (2020)
- Peak rating: 2386 (December 2024)

Maili-Jade Ouellet (born 2002) is a Canadian chess player who holds the Woman Grandmaster title and is the current Canadian Women's Chess Champion.

== Biography ==
Ouellet learned to play chess as a child and began competing in tournaments at 7 years of age.

In 2014, Ouellet won the Canadian Youth Chess Championship in the girls U12 age group. In 2018, she won the girls U16 & U18 category.

In 2017, she won the Women's Canadian Chess Championship, which also acted as the women's Zonal 2.1 tournament that year, which qualified her for the Women's World Chess Championship 2018 (November).

Ouellet has played for Canada five times in the Women's Chess Olympiad:

- In 2016, at reserve board in the 42nd Chess Olympiad in Baku (+5, =0, -2),
- In 2018, at third board in the 43rd Chess Olympiad in Batumi (+5 =2 -3).
- In 2022, at first board in the 44th Chess Olympiad in Chennai (+6 =1 -4).
- In 2024, at first board in the 45th Chess Olympiad in Budapest.
- In 2026, at first board in the 46th Chess Olympiad in Baku.

In 2016, she was awarded the Woman International Master (WIM) title. She received the Woman Grandmaster (WGM) title in 2020 for winning the 2019 American Continental Women's Championship in Aguascalientes, Mexico.

In April 2022, Ouellet won the 2022 Canadian Women's Chess Championship in Kingston, Ontario, with a perfect score of 9/9.

On April 4th, 2024, Ouellet won the 2024 Canadian Women's Chess Championship. She won with a score of 7.5/9 beating Svitlana Demchenko on tiebreaks.

On April 7th, 2026, Ouellet won the 2026 Canadian Women's Chess Championship in Montreal, Quebec, with a score of 8.5/9. This marked her fourth national championship.
