= Nikolay Noritsyn =

Canadian chess player (born 1991)

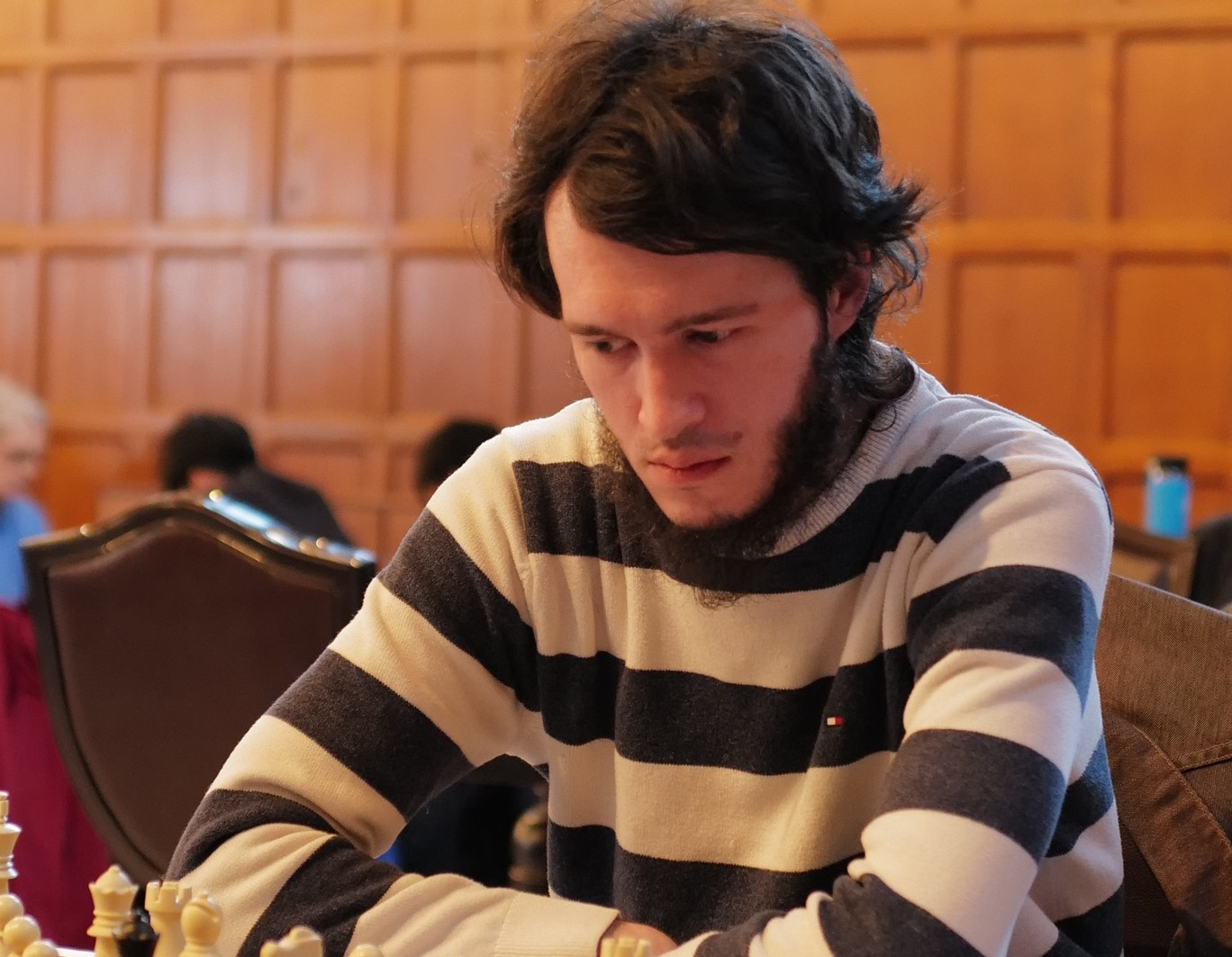
- Nikolay Noritsyn at Hart House, 2023.

Personal information
- Born: May 28, 1991 (age 35) Kaliningrad, Russia

Chess career
- Country: Canada
- Title: International Master (2007)
- FIDE rating: 2458 (July 2026)
- Peak rating: 2521 (December 2019)

Nikolay Noritsyn (born May 28, 1991) is a Canadian chess player and coach. He holds the FIDE title of International Master and is a three-time and current Canadian Chess Champion.

== Biography ==
Noritsyn was born in Kaliningrad, Russia. He moved to Canada in December 2001. He won the Canadian Closed Championship in 2007 and was awarded the International Master title as a result. He finished second behind Luke McShane at the 2010 Canadian Open Chess Championship. In 2011 he won the Quebec Open Chess Championship. He has represented Canada at the 2008, 2010, 2012, 2018, and 2024 Chess Olympiads.

He won the Canadian Closed Championship in 2007 and was awarded the International Master title as a result. He also went on to win the championship two more times in 2023 and 2025.
