= Natalia Khoudgarian =

Russian-born Canadian chess player (born 1973)

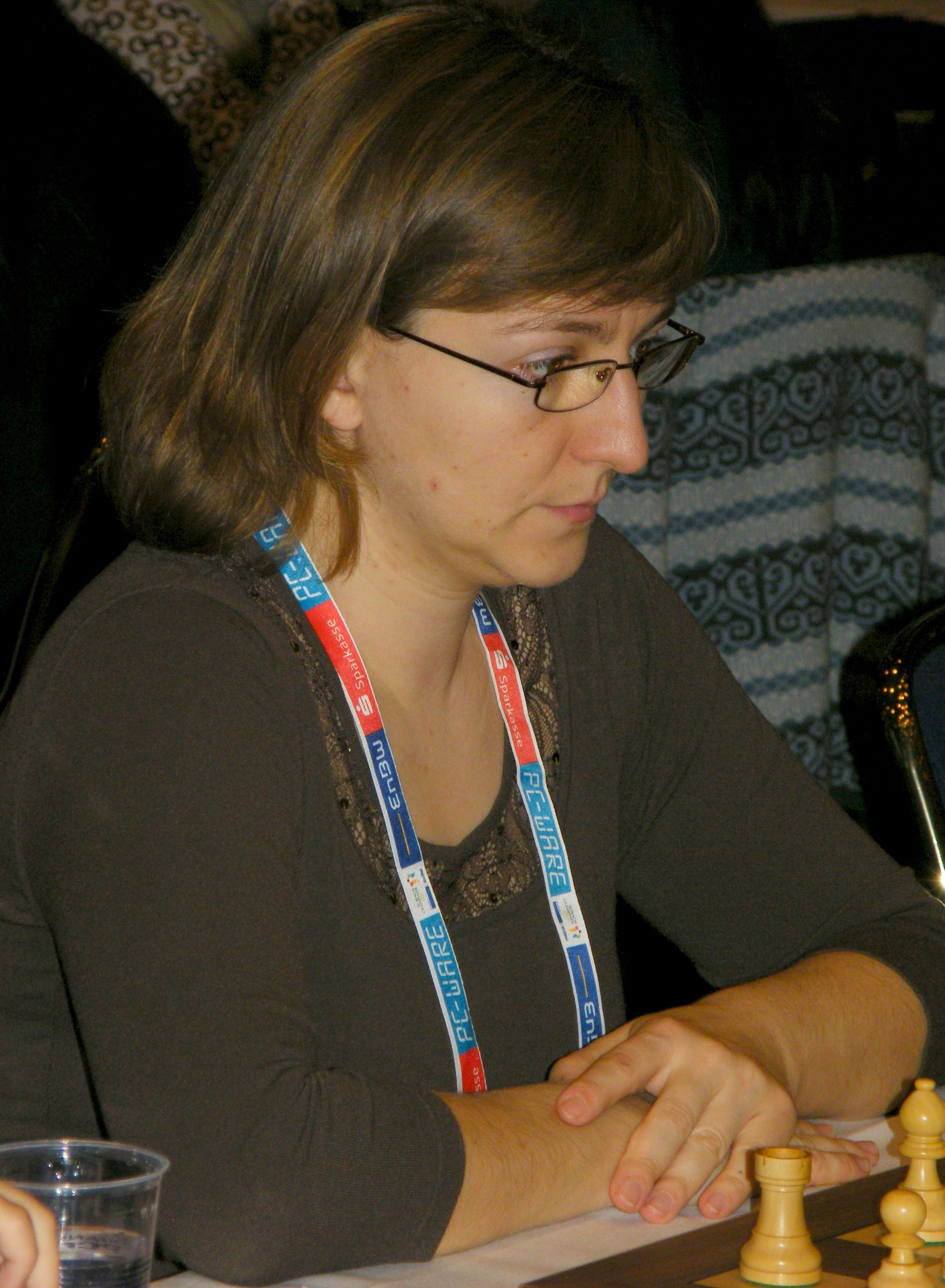
- at the 38th Chess Olympiad, 2008

Personal information
- Born: 1973 (age 52–53) Moscow, Soviet Union

Chess career
- Country: Russia; Canada
- Title: Woman International Master (1996)
- Peak rating: 2165 (September 2012)

Natalia Khoudgarian (born 1973) is a Russian-born Canadian chess player. She was awarded the title of Woman International Master (WIM) by FIDE in 1996.

Khoudgarian won the Canadian women's championship four times: in 2006, 2007, 2011, 2012. She competed in the Women's World Championship in 2006, 2008 and 2012. She has played on the Canadian team at the Women's Chess Olympiad in 1996, 2006, 2008, 2012 and 2014.

Khoudgarian is of Armenian descent.
