= Tomas Krnan =

Canadian chess player

Personal information
- Born: March 31, 1988 (age 38)

Chess career
- Country: Canada
- Title: International Master (2006)
- FIDE rating: 2427 (July 2026)
- Peak rating: 2450 (November 2016)

Tomas Krnan is a Canadian chess International Master.

== Chess career ==
He has represented his country in a number of chess olympiads, including 2006 and 2016.

He played in the Chess World Cup 2015, being defeated by Ding Liren in the first round.
