= Svitlana Demchenko =

Ukrainian-Canadian chess player (born 2003)

Personal information
- Born: October 4, 2003 (age 23) Mykolaiv, Ukraine

Chess career
- Country: Ukraine (until 2015); Canada (since 2015)
- Title: Woman International Master (2019)
- FIDE rating: 2166 (September 2026)
- Peak rating: 2285 (September 2021)

Svitlana Demchenko (born October 4, 2003) is a Ukrainian-Canadian chess player. Svitlana Demchenko achieved the title of Woman FIDE Master (WFM) in 2016 and the title of Woman International Master (WIM) in 2019. Svitlana Demchenko is the 2023 Canadian Women's Closed Champion.

== Biography ==
She was a five-time Canadian Girls Champion and a two-time North American Girls Champion in different age categories. Demchenko has been a member of the Canadian Women's Olympiad Team since 2018, and has represented Canada at the Women's World Cup.

She played on the Canadian Women's Chess Olympiad team:

- In 2018 Batumi Chess Olympiad on the fourth board, scoring 5½/9 (+2, =7, -0).
- In 2022 Chennai Chess Olympiad on the second board, scoring 7½/11 (+6, =3, -2).
- In 2024 Budapest Chess Olympiad on the fourth board, scoring 3½/8 (+2, =3, -3).

She competed in the 2021 Women's Chess World Cup, where she pushed 35th seed Karina Cyfka to tiebreaks in the first round despite being rated more than 300 points lower, losing in the second set of rapid tiebreaks.

Launching in 2021, "Svitlana’s Smart Moves" is an educational show on ChessBase, hosted by Svitlana Demchenko and Arne Kaehler. Svitlana has also authored several training courses for ChessBase on openings and strategy.

She is an active chess streamer on Twitch under the name "SvetaStream".

== Personal life ==
She studied medicine at the University of Ottawa.
