= Jan Smejkal =

Czech chess grandmaster (born 1946)

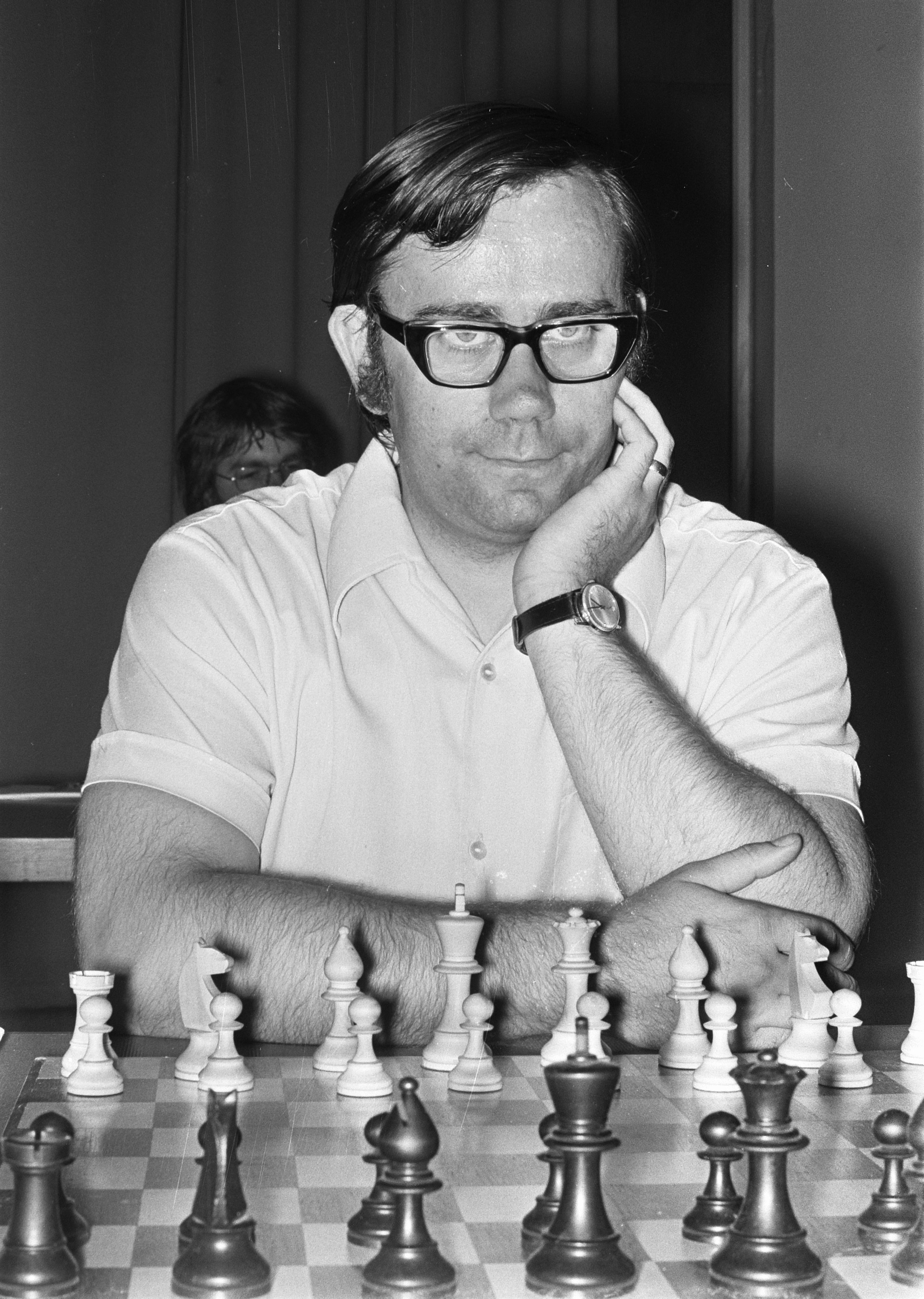
- Smejkal in 1975

Personal information
- Born: 22 March 1946 (age 80) Lanškroun, Czechoslovakia

Chess career
- Country: Czechoslovakia (until 1993); Czech Republic (since 1993)
- Title: Grandmaster (1972)
- Peak rating: 2615 (January 1976)
- Peak ranking: No. 11 (January 1976)

Jan Smejkal (born 22 March 1946) is a Czech chess player and, since 1972, an International Grandmaster. In the 1970s he was among the world chess elite. He was champion of Czechoslovakia in 1973, 1979 and 1986, and won many international tournaments, including Polanica Zdrój in 1970 and 1972, Smederevska Palanka in 1971, Palma in 1972, Novi Sad in 1976, Vršac in 1977, Leipzig in 1977, Warsaw in 1979, Trenčianské Teplice in 1979, and Baden-Baden in 1985. At the 1973 Interzonal tournament in Leningrad he finished fourth, just missing out on qualification for the World Championship Candidates Tournament.

== Notable chess games ==
- Jan Smejkal v Vasily Smyslov, Hastings 1968, Modern Defense, King Pawn Fianchetto (B06), 1–0: sacrificing an exchange in order to attack the black king
- Jan Smejkal v Florin Gheorghiu, Palma de Mallorca 1972, Nimzo-Indian (E41), 1–0: a combination using the Excelsior theme
- Lev Polugaevsky v Jan Smejkal, Reykjavik (0.25) 1978, English, Symmetrical (A33), 0–1: two rooks more powerful than a queen
- Jan Smejkal v Predrag Nikolić, Vršac 1981, Queen's Gambit Declined, Slav (D11), 1–0: rooks attacking along the d-file
