= Denker Tournament of High School Champions =

U.S. chess tournament

The Denker Tournament of High School Champions is a chess tournament that occurs annually in the United States alongside the US Open, the Dewain Barber National Tournament of Middle School State Champions, the Ruth Haring National Girls Tournament of Champions (RHNGTOC), and the John D. Rockefeller III National Tournament of Elementary School State Champions. The tournament is named for its founder, Arnold Denker, and is usually referred to as "The Denker".

== History ==
The Denker Tournament of High School Champions was started by Arnold Denker in 1984.

== Qualifying ==
This chess tournament is by invitation only. Each United States Chess Federation sanctioned state affiliate, including Northern California, Southern California, and Washington, D.C., is allowed to send one player. If there is an odd number of players, the host state is allowed to send a second player to compete and win prizes.

Each state affiliate can use any method they wish to choose their representative. Many state affiliates have chosen to hold one tournament, usually their state championship tournament, as the qualifier. The highest finishing high school player from the high school championship division, is then chosen as the state representative. If no player is chosen, or for some reason cannot attend, the United States Chess Federation will instead contact the second-place finisher or designated alternate to determine if they wish to attend.

== Prizes ==
The tournament has multiple sponsors. The US Chess Trust provides scholarship money for the top players, based upon final rank. Mitchell Denker, son of Arnold Denker, provided funding for many of the prizes.

Players who are under the age of 16 are also eligible to win another scholarship. The Ursula Foster Scholarship provides $500 to the best finish by a competitor under 16. If there are no players under 16, it goes to the best finish by a player under 17.

In addition to monetary prizes, US Chess also added the "Denker Champion to its list of qualifiers for the World Youth Championship and the U.S. Junior Closed Championship."

== Winners ==
- 1985: Alexander Fishbein (CO)
- 1986: Danny Edelman (NY)
- 1987: Vivek Rao (PA)
- 1988: Vivek Rao (PA), Robby Adamson (AZ), Ilya Gurevich (MA)
- 1989: Jesse Kraai (NM)
- 1990: Alex Feldman (MN), Jesse Kraai (NM), Michael Lamon (CA-S), Mathew Morgan (VA)
- 1991: Alan Stein (CA-N)
- 1992: Vadim Tsemekhman (MI)
- 1993: Alex Kalikshtyn (NY)
- 1994: Dean Ippolito (NJ), Josh Manion (WI), Paul Rohwer (NE), Dmitry Zilberstein (CA-N), Aaron Wenger (OH)
- 1995: Charles Gelman (VA)
- 1996: John Bick (LA)
- 1997: Andrei Zaremba (MI), Andrew Whatley (AL)
- 1998: Florin Felecan (IL)
- 1999: Andrei Zaremba (MI), Steven Winer (MA)
- 2000: David John (TX), John Cole (IN), Matt Hoekstra (NC), Joshua Zillmer (WI), Nat W. Koons (WA)
- 2001: Thomas Bartell (NJ)
- 2002: Bruci Lopez (FL)
- 2003: William Aramil (IL), Ryan Milisits (PA)
- 2004: Mackenzie Molner (NJ), Pieta Garrett (AZ)
- 2005: Trevor Jackson (IN), Zhi-Ya Hu (MD), Josh Bakker (MA)
- 2006: Nelson Lopez (TX)
- 2007: Warren Harper (TX)
- 2008: Daniel Yeager (TX), Julian Landaw (CA-S), Scott Low (MD)
- 2009: Abby Marshall (VA)
- 2010: Steven Zierk (CA-N)
- 2011: Michael Vilenchuk (OH)
- 2012: Atulya Shetty (MI), Darwin Yang (TX)
- 2013: Kapil Chandran (CT), Michael William Brown (CA-S), Safal Bora (MI)
- 2014: Christopher Gu (RI)
- 2015: Alexander Velikanov (WI)
- 2016: Mika Brattain (MA)
- 2017: Praveen Balakrishnan (VA), Edward Song (MI), Bryce Tiglon (WA), Zhaozhi (George) Li (IL)
- 2018: Praveen Balakrishnan (VA)
- 2019: Bryce Tiglon (WA), Ben Li (MI), Emily Nguyen (TX)
- 2020: Nicholas De T. Checa (NY)
- 2021: Awonder Liang (WI)
- 2022: Arthur Guo (GA), Andrew Hong (CA), Sandeep Sethuraman (AZ)
- 2023: Arthur Guo (GA)
- 2024: Sandeep Sethuraman (AZ), Avi Kaplan (IL)

== See also ==
- Scholastic chess in the United States
