= Bent Larsen =

Danish chess grandmaster and author (1935–2010)

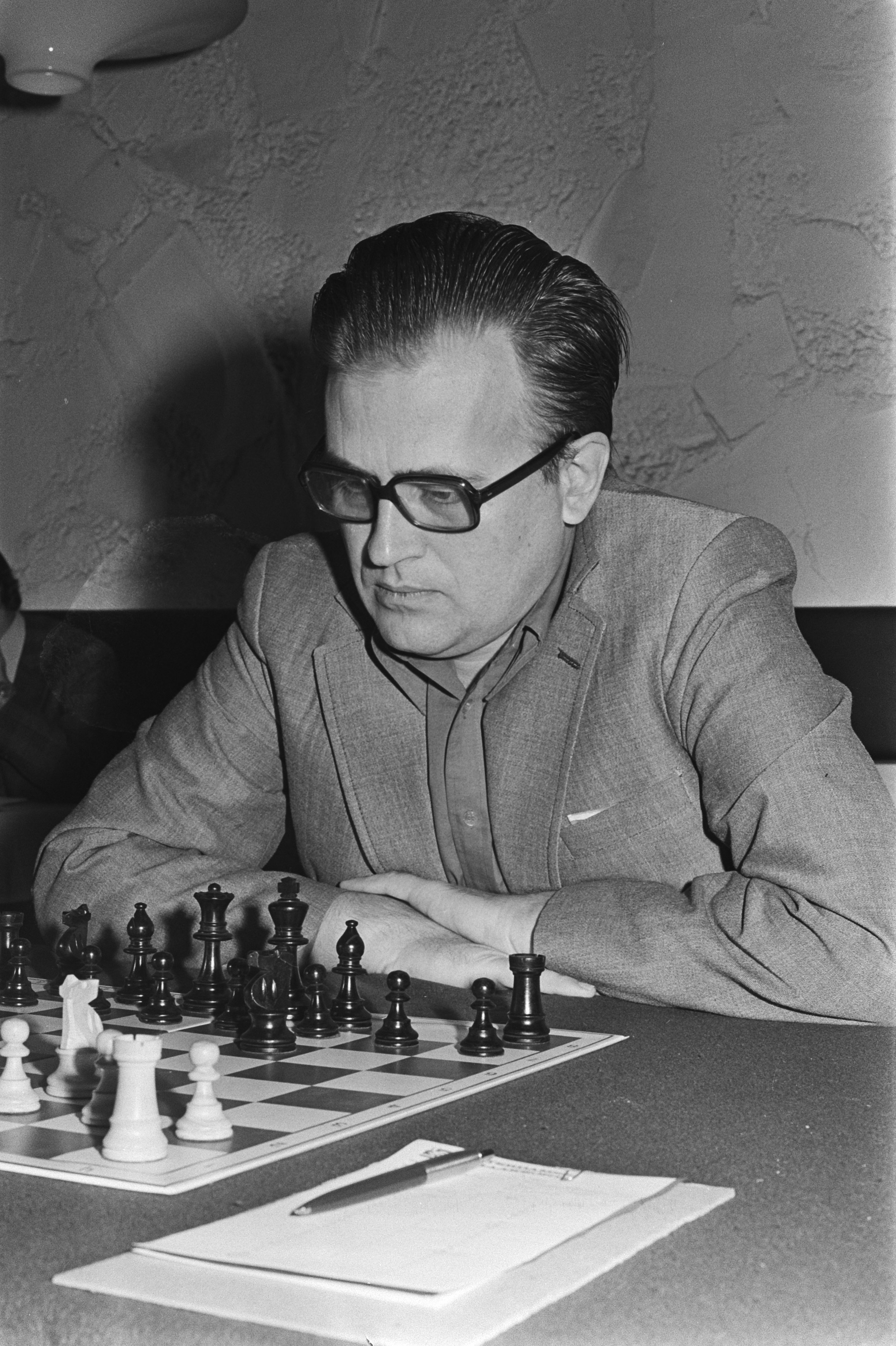
- Larsen in 1977

Personal information
- Born: Jørgen Bent Larsen; 4 March 1935 Thisted, Denmark
- Died: 9 September 2010 (aged 75) Buenos Aires, Argentina

Chess career
- Country: Denmark
- Title: Grandmaster (1956)
- Peak rating: 2660 (July 1971)
- Peak ranking: No. 4 (July 1971)

Jørgen Bent Larsen (4 March 1935 – 9 September 2010) was a Danish chess grandmaster and author. Known for his imaginative and unorthodox style of play, he was the second-strongest non-Soviet player, behind only Bobby Fischer, for much of the 1960s and 1970s. He is considered to be the strongest player born in Denmark and the strongest from Scandinavia until the emergence of Magnus Carlsen.

Larsen was a six-time Danish Champion and a Candidate for the World Chess Championship on four occasions, reaching the semifinal three times. He had multiple wins over all seven World Champions who held the title from 1948 to 1985: Mikhail Botvinnik, Vasily Smyslov, Mikhail Tal, Tigran Petrosian, Boris Spassky, Bobby Fischer, and Anatoly Karpov, but lifetime negative scores against them.

From the early 1970s onward, he divided his years between Las Palmas and Buenos Aires with his Argentinian-born wife Laura Beatriz Benedini. He suffered from diabetes, and he died in 2010 from a cerebral haemorrhage.

== Career ==
=== Early life ===
Larsen was born in Tilsted, near Thisted in Denmark, and was educated at Aalborg Cathedral School. In January 1942, he contracted a number of childhood diseases. Although none had any permanent effects, it was during this period that he discovered chess. Larsen went on to represent Denmark twice in the World Junior Championship, in 1951 at Birmingham (placing fifth) and in 1953 at Copenhagen (placing eighth). He began playing seriously at the age of 17 when he moved to Copenhagen to study civil engineering, but he never graduated, choosing instead to play chess professionally. Furthermore, during his military service he studied Russian, which was instrumental in assisting him to understand Russian-language chess literature (something Bobby Fischer was also known to have done). Larsen became an International Master at the age of 19 in 1954, from his bronze-medal performance on board one at the Amsterdam Olympiad. He won his first of six Danish Championships in 1954, repeating this feat in 1955, 1956, 1959, 1963 and 1964.

Larsen defeated Friðrik Ólafsson in an exhibition match at Oslo in 1955 by 4½–3½. He took first prize at the Gijón International Chess Tournament in 1956, ahead of Klaus Darga and Jan Hein Donner, and in the same year won at Copenhagen with 8/9.

=== Young Grandmaster ===
Larsen became an International Grandmaster in 1956 with his gold-medal performance on board one at the Moscow Olympiad, where he drew with World Champion Mikhail Botvinnik. He tied for 1st–2nd places at Hastings 1956–57 on 6½/9 with Svetozar Gligorić. At Dallas 1957, he scored 7½/14 for a shared 3rd–4th place; the winners were Gligorić and Samuel Reshevsky.

At the 1957 Wageningen Zonal, he and Donner tied for 3rd–4th places, with 12½/17. There were only three qualifying berths, so Larsen and Donner had to play off; this match Larsen won by 3–1 at The Hague 1958, thus qualifying for his first Interzonal, at Portorož 1958. He scored only 8½/20 for 16th place, and was not close to qualifying. However, he scored his first major individual international success by winning Mar del Plata 1958 with 12/15, ahead of William Lombardy, Erich Eliskases, Oscar Panno, and Hermann Pilnik.

Larsen went into a slump beginning with the 1958 Interzonal. He tied 5th–6th in a strong field at Zürich 1959 with 9½/15 – behind winner Tal, Gligorić, Paul Keres, and Bobby Fischer – but placed only 4th in a middle-range field at the 1960 Berg en Dal Zonal 1960 with 5½/9, and did not advance to the Interzonal. He recovered by sharing 1st–2nd places at Beverwijk 1961 on 7½/9 with Borislav Ivkov. At Zürich 1961, he tied for 6th–7th places with 6/11, as Keres won ahead of Tigran Petrosian. At Moscow 1962, he shared 7th–11th places with 7½/15 (Yuri Averbakh won).

=== Challenging for the World title ===
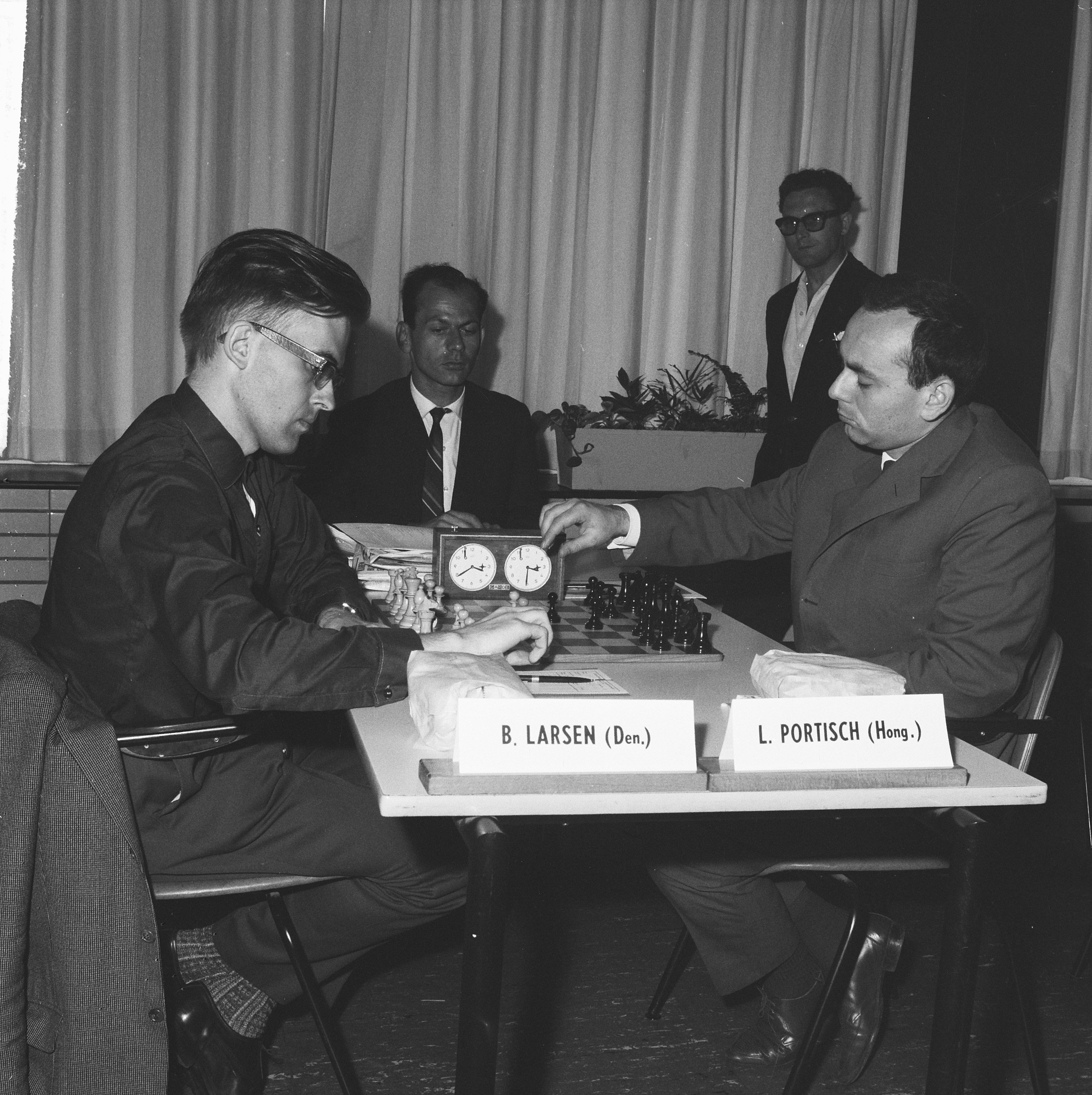
Larsen vs. Portisch (Interzonal 1964)

Around this time Larsen diversified his style, switching over to risky and unusual openings in some of his games, to try to throw his opponents off balance; this led to the recovery of his form and further development of his chess. He finished 2nd at the 1963 Halle Zonal with 13/19, behind winner Lajos Portisch, to advance to the Interzonal the next year. At Belgrade 1964, he shared 5th–6th places with 10/17 (Boris Spassky won). He tied for 5th–7th places at Beverwijk 1964 on 9½/15; Keres and Nei won. Larsen's unusual openings were on full display at the 1964 Amsterdam Interzonal, where he shared the 1st–4th places on 17/23 with Spassky, Tal, and Vasily Smyslov, advancing as a Candidate.

In the 1965 Candidates' matches, he defeated Borislav Ivkov at Bled by 5½–2½ but lost a hard-fought semifinal, also at Bled by 4½–5½ to former World Champion Mikhail Tal, who won the tenth game with a complex speculative knight sacrifice in the center. Larsen won a playoff match for alternates, an eventual third-place Candidates' position, against Efim Geller by 5–4 at Copenhagen 1966 (the first time a Soviet grandmaster had ever been beaten by a non-Soviet in a match). In 1967 he won the Sousse Interzonal with the score of 15½/21 after Fischer withdrew; this placed him 1½ points ahead of the field. He then won his first-round match against Lajos Portisch by 5½–4½ at Poreč 1968. In Malmö, however, he lost the semifinal by 2½–5½ to Boris Spassky, who went on to win the title.

In 1970 he shared 2nd in the Palma de Mallorca Interzonal, on 15/23, behind Bobby Fischer. He reached his top rank in the Elo rating system at the start of 1971, equal third in the world (with Viktor Korchnoi, behind Fischer and Spassky) with a rating of 2660. He then defeated Wolfgang Uhlmann by 5½–3½ at Las Palmas 1971, but lost the semifinal 0–6 at Denver to Fischer, who also went on to win the title.

Larsen later claimed that his one-sided loss to Fischer was due in part to his condition during the match: "The organizers chose the wrong time for this match. I was languid with the heat and Fischer was better prepared for such exceptional circumstances... I saw chess pieces through a mist and, thus, my level of playing was not good."

In 1973 he failed to advance from the Leningrad Interzonal; he tied for 5th–6th places with 10/17, with Korchnoi and Anatoly Karpov winning. In 1976 he won the Biel Interzonal, but lost his 1977 Candidates' match, a rematch of their 1968 encounter, to Lajos Portisch by 3½–6½ at Rotterdam. In the Riga Interzonal of 1979, Larsen scored 10/17 for 7th place, and did not advance.

=== Tournament dominance (1965–73) ===
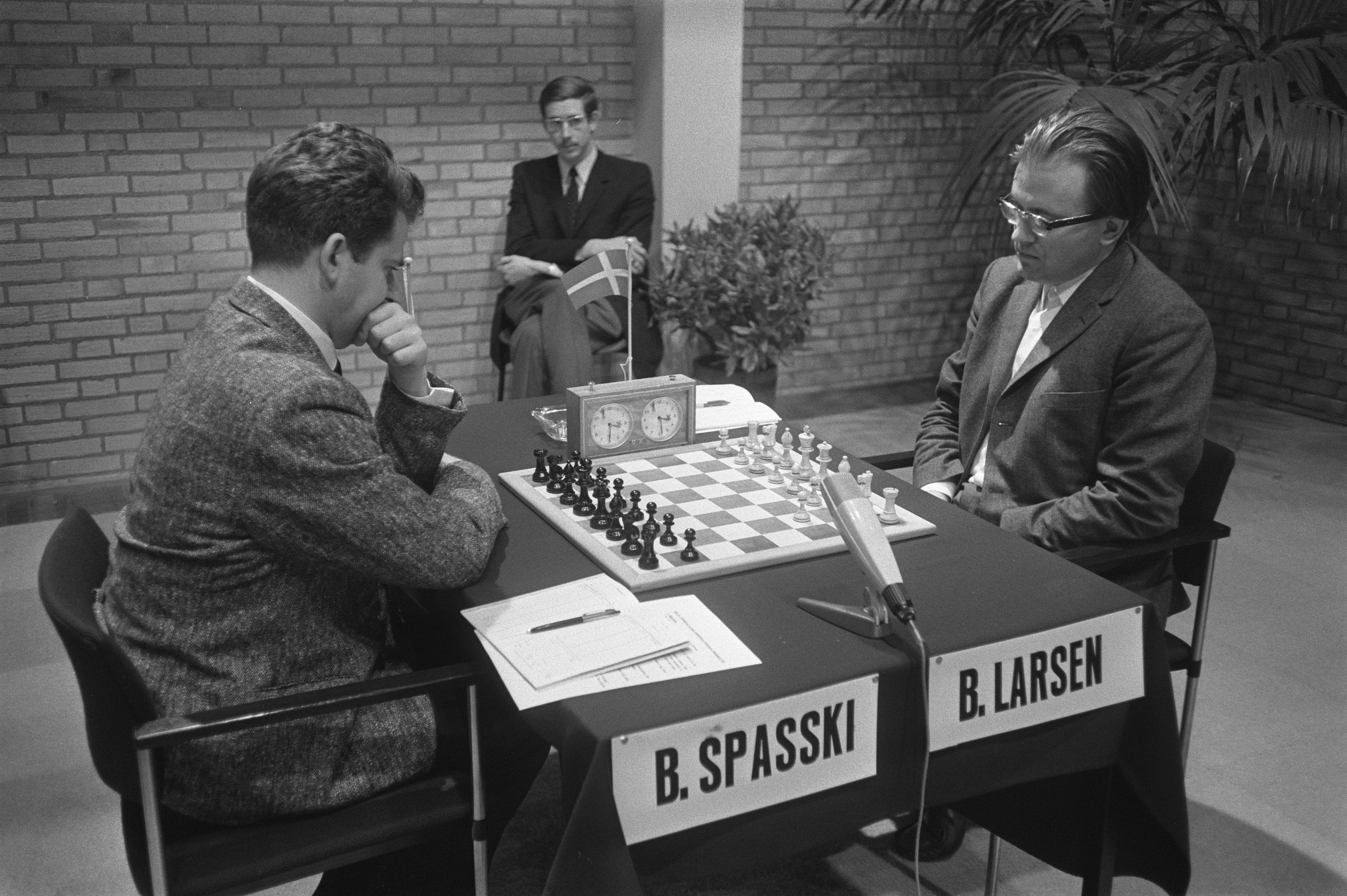
Spassky vs. Larsen (Leiden, 1970)

Starting in the mid-1960s, Larsen enjoyed a very successful run in major tournaments around the world, and he and Fischer became the two strongest players outside the Soviet Union. Larsen played in a lot of strong events, at least as many as any other top player, and repeatedly finished ahead of the top Soviet players. He won at Le Havre 1966 with 9/11, ahead of Lev Polugaevsky. At Santa Monica 1966, he placed third with 10/18, behind Spassky and Fischer, however, Larsen beat reigning World Champion Tigran Petrosyan twice. He won at Havana 1967 with 15/19, ahead of a strong group that included Mark Taimanov, Smyslov, Polugaevsky, Gligorić, and Miroslav Filip. He shared 2nd–3rd places at Dundee 1967 with 5½/8, behind Gligorić. At Beverwijk 1967, he was 4th with 8½/15 (Spassky won). At Monte Carlo 1967, he shared 3rd–4th with 6/9, behind Fischer and Efim Geller. He shared 1st–2nd at Winnipeg 1967 with 6/9, along with Darga, ahead of Spassky and Keres. He won at Palma de Mallorca 1967 with 13/17, ahead of Smyslov, Botvinnik, Portisch, Gligorić, and Borislav Ivkov. He was awarded the first Chess Oscar in 1967.

Somewhat unusually for the late 1960s, Larsen—as one of the world's top players—often entered large Open tournaments run on the Swiss system, and had plenty of success. He won the Canadian Open Chess Championships at Toronto 1968 and St. John's 1970. He also won the U.S. Open Chess Championship of 1968 at Aspen, Colorado, and that at Boston in 1970.

Larsen won at Monte Carlo 1968 with 9½/13, ahead of Botvinnik, Smyslov, Vlastimil Hort, Robert Byrne, Portisch, and Pal Benko. This completed a string of five consecutive clear wins of major tournaments, a feat that had not previously been accomplished in modern chess. Larsen shared 2nd–3rd places at Palma de Mallorca 1968 with 13/17, along with Spassky; Viktor Korchnoi won. In a playoff match for third place in the Candidates Tournament, he defeated Tal at Eersel 1969 by 5½–2½ in a rematch of their 1965 encounter. He won at Palma de Mallorca 1969 with 12/17, ahead of Petrosian, Korchnoi, Hort, and Spassky. There was a further victory at Buesum 1969 with 11/15, ahead of Polugaevsky. At San Juan 1969, he scored 9/15 for a shared 6th–7th place (Spassky won). He defeated International Master Heikki Westerinen by 6–2 at Helsinki in 1969 in a match in which every game was decisive.

Larsen won at Lugano 1970 with 9½/14, ahead of Olafsson. In the USSR vs Rest of the World match at Belgrade 1970, he played first board for the World side, ahead of Fischer, and scored 2½/4 against Spassky and Leonid Stein. At Leiden 1970, he shared 3rd–4th places with 5½/12, (Spassky won). He defeated Lubomir Kavalek in a 1970 exhibition match at Solingen by 6–2. He won at Vinkovci 1970 with 10½/15, ahead of David Bronstein, Hort, and Gligorić. At Palma de Mallorca 1970, he shared 6th–7th places with 9/15 (Panno and Ljubomir Ljubojević were joint winners). Larsen shared 8th–9th places at San Antonio 1972 on 8½/15 (Portisch, Petrosian, and Karpov triumphed). He won at Teesside 1972 with 11/15, ahead of Ljubojević and Portisch. At Las Palmas 1972, he shared 2nd–3rd places on 11/15 (Portisch won).

Larsen won at Hastings 1972–73 on 11½/15, ahead of Wolfgang Uhlmann. At Bauang 1973, he scored 6/9 for 4th place (Kavalek won). Larsen won at Grenaa 1973 in the Nordic Championship with 8½/10. He won again at Manila 1973 with 12½/15, ahead of Ljubojević and Kavalek. In 1975, Larsen defeated Danish Champion and future International Master Gert Iskov at Gellerup by the score of 5½–½ and lost a match to GM Ulf Andersson by the score of 5½–2½ at Stockholm the same year.

=== Olympiad performances ===
He represented Denmark six times in Chess Olympiad play, always on first board, and compiled an aggregate score of 75/109 (+61 −20 =28), for 68.8%. He always played a very high number of games and in 1954 played a maximum of 19 games. He won three board medals, one gold and two bronze.

- Amsterdam 1954, board one, 13½/19 (+11 −3 =5), board bronze medal;
- Moscow 1956, board one, 14/18 (+11 −1 =6), board gold medal;
- Munich 1958, board one, 13/19 (+11 −4 =4);
- Havana 1966, board one, 11/18 (+9 −5 =4);
- Lugano 1968, board one, 10½/18 (+8 −5 =5);
- Siegen 1970, board one, 13/17 (+11 −2 =4), board bronze medal.

=== Later career ===
In 1988 he lost a game to Deep Thought in the Software Toolworks Championship, becoming the first Grandmaster and, at the time, the player with the highest Elo rating (by then 2560) to be defeated by a computer in tournament play. In 1993 Larsen won a return match against the supercomputer Deep Blue in Copenhagen by 2½–1½.

Despite his advancing age, Larsen continued to play in tournaments. In 1999, he finished 7th out of 10 in the Danish Championship, but in the 2000 event he was forced to withdraw when he became seriously ill with an edema which required brain surgery. Thereafter he only played a few tournaments in Buenos Aires. He was 4th in the 2002 Najdorf Memorial knock-out.

Larsen's final tournament was Magistral Internacional Ruibal 2008 in Buenos Aires. He delivered a poor performance and lost all nine games he played. In the April 2009 FIDE list, he had an Elo rating of 2415.

He died in Buenos Aires in September 2010. According to the English Chess Federation Newsletter, "His health had been poor for some considerable time and he had been virtually inactive for years".

== Playing style and authorship ==
Larsen was known as a deep-thinking and highly imaginative player, more willing to try unorthodox ideas and to take more risks than most of his peers. This aspect of his play could even manifest itself in his choice of openings. Grandmaster Samuel Reshevsky wrote that Larsen "is a firm believer in the value of surprise", and that led him to resort to "dubious variations in various openings". He also wrote that while Larsen "has a great deal of confidence in his game and fears no one", his style was "extremely effective against relatively weak opponents but has not been too successful against top-notchers."

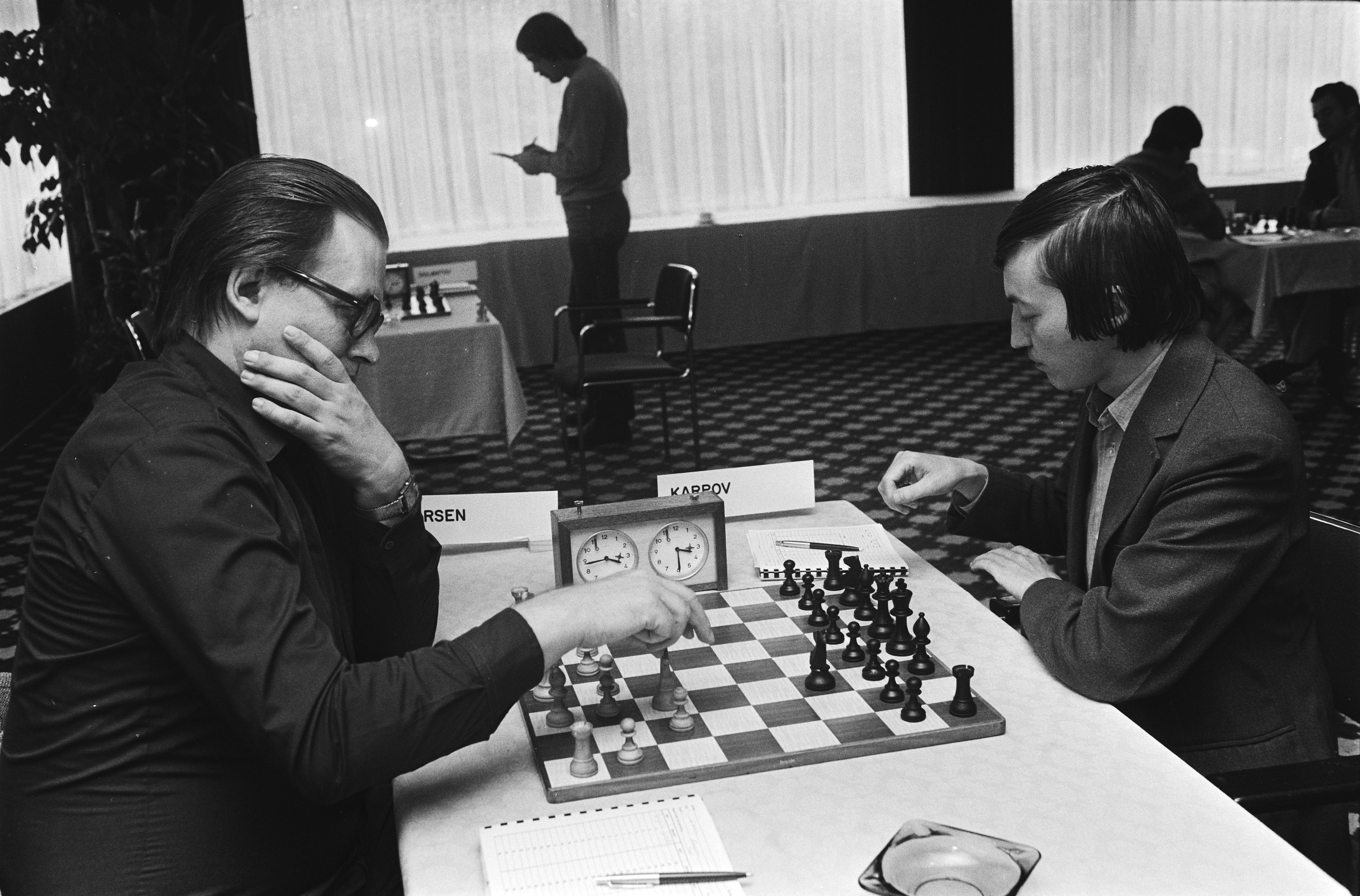
Larsen vs. Karpov (1980)

He was one of the very few modern grandmasters to have employed Bird's Opening (1.f4) with any regularity, and had a long-term association with the move 1.b3, a system commonly known as Larsen's Opening or the Nimzo–Larsen Attack in his (and Aron Nimzowitsch's) honor. He played the Dutch Defence with success at a time when the opening was rarely seen at the top level. He revived the almost dormant Bishop's Opening (1.e4 e5 2.Bc4) with success in 1964 and explored new ways for Black to seek activity in the Philidor Defence (1.e4 e5 2.Nf3 d6). Indeed, he wrote a short monograph on the Philidor, Why Not The Philidor Defense?, in 1971. He was also the first top player to successfully use the Grand Prix Attack against the Sicilian Defence (1.e4 c5 2.f4), spurring a sudden and sustained gain in its popularity. In the mid-1960s, he showed surprising faith in Alekhine's Defence (1.e4 Nf6) and even employed it on important occasions. He played the rare Scandinavian Defence 1.e4 d5 to defeat World Champion Anatoly Karpov in 1979, sparking renewed interest in that variation. A favourite line in the Caro–Kann Defence (1.e4 c6 2.d4 d5 3.Nc3 dxe4 4.Nxe4 Nf6 5.Nxf6+ gxf6) is co-named for him and David Bronstein; the idea is to accept a weakness to the Black pawn structure in exchange for an unbalancing of the position and retaining the bishop pair.

Larsen's 1969 book Larsen's Selected Games of Chess, 1948–69 contained annotations that delved into chess psychology and the effective use of rare openings. A chapter of the book gives some of Larsen's thoughts on his own style, and he upholds the views of Polugaevsky and Gligorić that he indulged in flank attacks and favored the advance of rooks' pawns more than other contemporary masters. He was also content to be described as an aggressive player, stemming from his dislike of draws. He disputed the notion that he would willingly accept dubious positions in order to complicate tactics, a characteristic he attributed more to Tal. The book was first published in Denmark; an English-language version followed in 1970 and was sub-titled "Master of Counter-Attack".

Larsen was one of seven top grandmasters who wrote chapters for the 1974 book How to Open a Chess Game. He edited the tournament book for San Antonio 1972. When Ken Smith played most of his games in that event with the white pieces using the Smith-Morra Gambit, Larsen quipped—after one of Smith's opponents responded to 1.e4 with 1...e6, entering a French Defence and avoiding the gambit—"stronger was c5, winning a pawn!" He also wrote the well-received Karpov Vs. Korchnoi: World Chess Championship, 1978, which was published within days of the match ending and was the first book in any language on the 1978 World Championship match.

The Grünfeld Defence (1.d4 Nf6 2.c4 g6 3.Nc3 d5) was another opening that became a frequent choice of Larsen with the Black pieces, and similarly he placed considerable reliance on Grünfeld-Indian systems as White. This led him to co-author, with Steffen Zeuthen, a 1979 book on this opening titled Zoom 001 Zero Hour for Operative Chess Opening Models.

== Notable games ==
- Bent Larsen vs. Boris Spassky, Amsterdam Interzonal 1964, Bird's Opening (A03), 1–0 Larsen successfully played unusual openings in this tournament, and here he uses one of them to knock off a top Soviet, on his way to winning the tournament.
- David Bronstein vs. Bent Larsen, Amsterdam Interzonal 1964, King's Indian Defense: Averbakh. Benoni Defense Advanced Variation (E75), 0–1 Larsen defends and ends Bronstein's dream of becoming a World Championship Candidate.
- Svetozar Gligorić vs. Bent Larsen, Zagreb 1965, Sicilian Defence, Scheveningen Variation (B83), 0–1 Gligorić launches a dangerous-looking attack, but Larsen finds an inspired defence. Larsen had a strong head-to-head dominance over the top Yugoslav player of that era.
- Bobby Fischer vs. Bent Larsen, Santa Monica 1966, Ruy Lopez, Open Variation (C82), 0–1 Fischer has a promising position but miscalculates and is punished in drastic style by Larsen's counterattack.
- Bent Larsen vs. Tigran Petrosian, Santa Monica 1966, Sicilian Defence, Accelerated Dragon Variation (B39), 1–0 Larsen unleashes a queen sacrifice to defeat the World Champion.
- Mikhail Tal vs. Bent Larsen, Eersel 1969, match game 6, Sicilian Defence, Richter–Rauzer Variation (B65), 0–1 Larsen was dangerous with the Black pieces, and here he shows a former World Champion why.
- Mikhail Botvinnik vs. Bent Larsen, Leiden 1970, Dutch Defense, Classical Variation (A90), 0–1 Larsen outplays another former World Champion in a long endgame.
- Bobby Fischer vs. Bent Larsen, Palma de Mallorca Interzonal 1970, Sicilian Defence, Velimirovic Attack (B89), 0–1 Larsen surprised Fischer, who was then nearly invincible, with an opening innovation, and plays a near-perfect game to win.
- Anatoly Karpov vs. Bent Larsen, Montreal 1979, Scandinavian Defence (B01), 0–1 Larsen springs a rare opening on the World Champion, and is rewarded with success.
- Viswanathan Anand vs. Bent Larsen, Roquebrune 1992, Sicilian (B27), 0–1 Larsen beats a future World Champion using Larsen's favourite opening.
