= Dallas Chess Club =

- Location: Dallas, Texas
- Country: United States
- Membership: About 300
- Major events: Annual Southwest Open
- Website: Official Website

The Dallas Chess Club (DCC) is one of the major chess organizations in the United States. The club has approximately 300 members, including a number of FIDE titled players such as: Grandmaster Alejandro Ramírez, GM Amon Simutowe, IM Jacek Stopa, IM Marko Zivanic, IM John Bartholomew, IM Robert Sanchez, IM Keaton Kiewra, FM Keith Hayward, GM Darwin Yang, FM Tommy He, and WIM Sarah Chiang. There are also a number of US Chess masters such as: Stanley Yang, Dion Su, Mihail Bantic, Austen Green, Jimmy Heiserman, Adarsh Jayakumar, Nelson Lopez, Jarod Pamatmat, and Abhishek Mallela. International Master (IM) Stopa is the club's most prominent member, as he tied for first place at the US Open in Indianapolis in August, 2009. James T. Campion directed the club for many years from old East Dallas. Historically, the club's most famous member was Ken Smith for whom the Smith-Morra Gambit is co-named, and the DCC hosts an annual tournament in his honor. In 2010, DCC hosted the state chess tournament.

In September 2009 DCC hosted the annual Southwest Open, which had 240 players and was won by IM Gergely Antal. The club also has several smaller tournaments every week, with approximately one hundred participants during the weekly event on Friday night. This makes DCC arguably the most active club in the United States, with more than twice as many regulars as New York's Marshall Chess Club. Indeed, the DCC has been described as "one of the most active chess clubs" in publications by US Chess. This sentiment is echoed in one unaffiliated chess blog which in 2008 declared the DCC to be "one of the most active clubs in the nation with over 2000 events hosted since 1991". Part of the reason for this success has been the chess program at the nearby University of Texas at Dallas, which is helmed by Director James Stallings, team coach IM Rade Milovanovic (who tied for first in the 2008 US Open in Dallas), assistant director Luis Salinas of the DCC, and senior lecturer Alexey Root (a former US women's national champion). The DCC is affiliated with the UTD Team, which is the nation's top-ranking collegiate team, and regularly hosts them in tournaments. The DCC also has local affiliates in the nearby cities of Fort Worth, Denton, Lewisville, and Plano.

DCC utilizes volunteers for club activities. Two notable volunteer TD's are Luis Salinas and Robert Jones. DCC hosted Robert Smeltzer (1930–2010), who set the world record in 1995 for playing the most rated chess games in a single year, for a total of 2266. Smeltzer was subsequently featured on the cover of the official USCF monthly magazine, Chess Life. In addition, the DCC hosts a number of adolescents who are ranked among the top 10 in the world for their age, this includes CM Tommy He, Jonathan Chiang, WCM Sarah Chiang, Jeffery Xiong, Andy Shao, FM Darwin Yang, Jarod Pamatmat, and a number of others. In 2007, Sarah Chiang received the silver medal at the World Youth Chess Championship held in Turkey. In 2008, Darwin Yang was the nation's top 11-year-old. In 2009, more than a dozen of the USCF's 58-member World Youth team were also members of the DCC. Also in 2008, the DCC hosted the Girls National Championships, in conjunction with the Kasparov Chess Foundation. Furthermore, the DCC hosts the annual state scholastic tournament for elementary, high-school, and college students.
