= Scholastic chess club =

Scholastic chess club may refer to:

- Chess club
- Scholastic chess in the United States
