= Scholastic chess in the United States =

Scholastic chess in the United States has progressively grown in recent years, evidenced by the increasing membership numbers of school-aged children in the United States Chess Federation. The onset of scholastic chess in the United States began in the early 1970s due to the "Fischer Boom", the phenomenon of markedly increased interest in chess in the United States due to the ascendency of eventual world champion Bobby Fischer. The first large-scale open national scholastic chess tournament was the National High School Championship, which was started by Bill Goichberg in 1969; the winner of the inaugural event was John Watson.

Since the 1990s, the number of student participants in national scholastic chess tournaments has also been steadily climbing, as shown by the rapid growth of the major national championship, the National Scholastic Chess Championships. Of course, with the exception of the few students competing at the top level, most participants are there to make friends, learn new skills, and simply have a good time.

== Tournaments ==
=== Format of tournaments ===
As far as the competition and awards are concerned, there are both team and individual awards at each grade and skill level. This format encourages players of all levels to compete for trophies and awards against opponents of similar playing ability. Generally, tournaments consists of seven rounds (games) spread over three days, where players with the same score coming into that round are paired against each other.

With one point for a win, half a point for a draw, and zero points for a loss, the players with the highest individual score after seven rounds are ranked for individual awards. In the team competition, the four highest scoring players from a particular school or club sum their scores for an overall team score. With so many scoring possibilities based on many individual outcomes, the team event usually causes the most discussion, planning and anticipation between coaches, players, and parents.

=== Nationals ===
The major national scholastic chess championships are the National High School (K–12) championship (est. 1969), National Junior High School (K–9) championship (est. 1973), the National Elementary (K–6) championship (est. 1976), and the National Primary (K–3) championship (est. 1983). These tournaments, held annually during the spring, have been around for the longest period of time, and typically attract the most participants, with the National Elementary championship often being the largest event (in terms of participants). Only five players in history have won the National Elementary, Junior High School and High School championships: Joel Benjamin, Joshua Waitzkin, Nawrose Nur, Danial Asaria, and Harutyun Akopyan; only Waitzkin, Nur, and Asaria have won the National Primary championship as well. Danial Asaria won the 2020 High School Senior Rapid, the 2016 National Junior High School Chess Championship K–8, the 2015 National K–12 Grade Championship, the National Junior Chess Congress 2014, and the 2012 National Elementary Chess championship. Akshat Chandra won the National High School Championship (K–12) in 2015, and the SuperNational Junior High School Championship (K–9) in 2013, both in his first and only appearance, but never played in the National Elementary Championship due to his late start in Chess.

Two prominent scholastic events which precede these tournaments in inception are the United States Junior Open championship (open to all players under the age of 21), and the United States Junior Invitational (Closed) championship (open to the top nine rated players under age 20 plus the previous year's U.S. Junior Open champion). These two are the oldest scholastic tournaments in the United States, with the winner of the U.S. Junior Closed being declared the United States Junior Chess Champion. Notable winners of the United States Junior Open (est. 1946) include Arthur Bisguier, Bobby Fischer, Yasser Seirawan, Greg Shahade, Shearwood McClelland III, Jennifer Shahade, and Asuka Nakamura. These tournaments are typically held during the summer. Previous winners of the United States Junior Invitational (est. 1966) include Larry Christiansen, Patrick Wolff, Joshua Waitzkin, Tal Shaked, Hikaru Nakamura, Robert Hess, Ray Robson, and Akshat Chandra. The preeminent invitational championship for players under age 16 is the U.S. Cadet Championship, which consists of the top eight rated players under then age of 16. Previous winners of this championship include Tal Shaked, Vinay Bhat, Aaron Pixton, and Jordy Mont-Reynaud.

In 1985, a new national scholastic championship, known as the Denker Tournament of High School Champions was inaugurated, pitting the scholastic high school champions of each state against each other for this championship. Previous winners include Alexander Fishbein, Ilya Gurevich, Jesse Kraai, and Abby Marshall. This tournament is typically held during the summer at the same time as the U.S. Open Chess Championship.

In 1991, another new national championship was introduced, known as the National School Grade championships. The idea of this tournament was to determine national individual and team championships for each grade (Kindergarten through 12th grade). This tournament typically occurs in late November/early December. Previous winners include Vinay Bhat, Fabiano Caruana, Abby Marshall, Shearwood McClelland III, Asuka Nakamura, Hikaru Nakamura, and Ray Robson.

In the 2000s, new national championships held include the National Youth Action championship (held in November) and the U.S. Junior Chess Congress (held in February).

Unofficially, the record for most individual national championships is 13, shared by Harutyun Akopyan and Asuka Nakamura.

In 2013, US Junior Chess Champion was GM Daniel Naroditsky, and in 2014 it was GM Kayden Troff.

==== Previous repeat team winners ====
Previous repeat winners of the team events for the different age groups include the Julia R. Masterman School, from Philadelphia, PA, Stuyvesant High School and Hunter College High School, both from New York, NY, The Shelby School, from Payson, AZ, Catalina Foothills High School, from Tucson, AZ, and Edward R. Murrow High School, in Brooklyn, NY, the subject of a 2007 book, The Kings of New York: A Year Among the Geeks, Oddballs and Geniuses Who Make Up America's Top High-School Chess Team, by Michael Weinreb.

Evanston Township High School from Evanston, IL, won the National High School Chess Championship in 1972, 1973, and 1974 (having finished 2nd in 1971).

=== Supernationals ===
Normally the major tournaments (high school, junior high school, elementary/primary) will be held in different locations at different times, to allow participation in multiple events. However, beginning in 1997, there has been a single event known as the Supernationals where all events are held in one place simultaneously; the idea of the Supernationals was born in the early 1990s partially in response to concerns that young prodigies may win more than one championship in the same year (for example, the national elementary and national junior high school championship). This event currently occurs every four years; the previous two Supernational events have shown huge participation numbers. The first event was held in Knoxville, Tennessee in 1997, and attracted 4,298 players.

== The Dean of Scholastic Chess ==
At the 2018 US Chess Delegate's Meeting, in Middleton, Wisconsin, Dewain Barber was named "Dean of Scholastic Chess". Barber has been a tremendous advocate of scholastic chess in the United States and has contributed to the development of a national invitational events for middle school state champions.

== See also ==
- United States Chess Federation
