= Ben Finegold =

American chess grandmaster (born 1969)

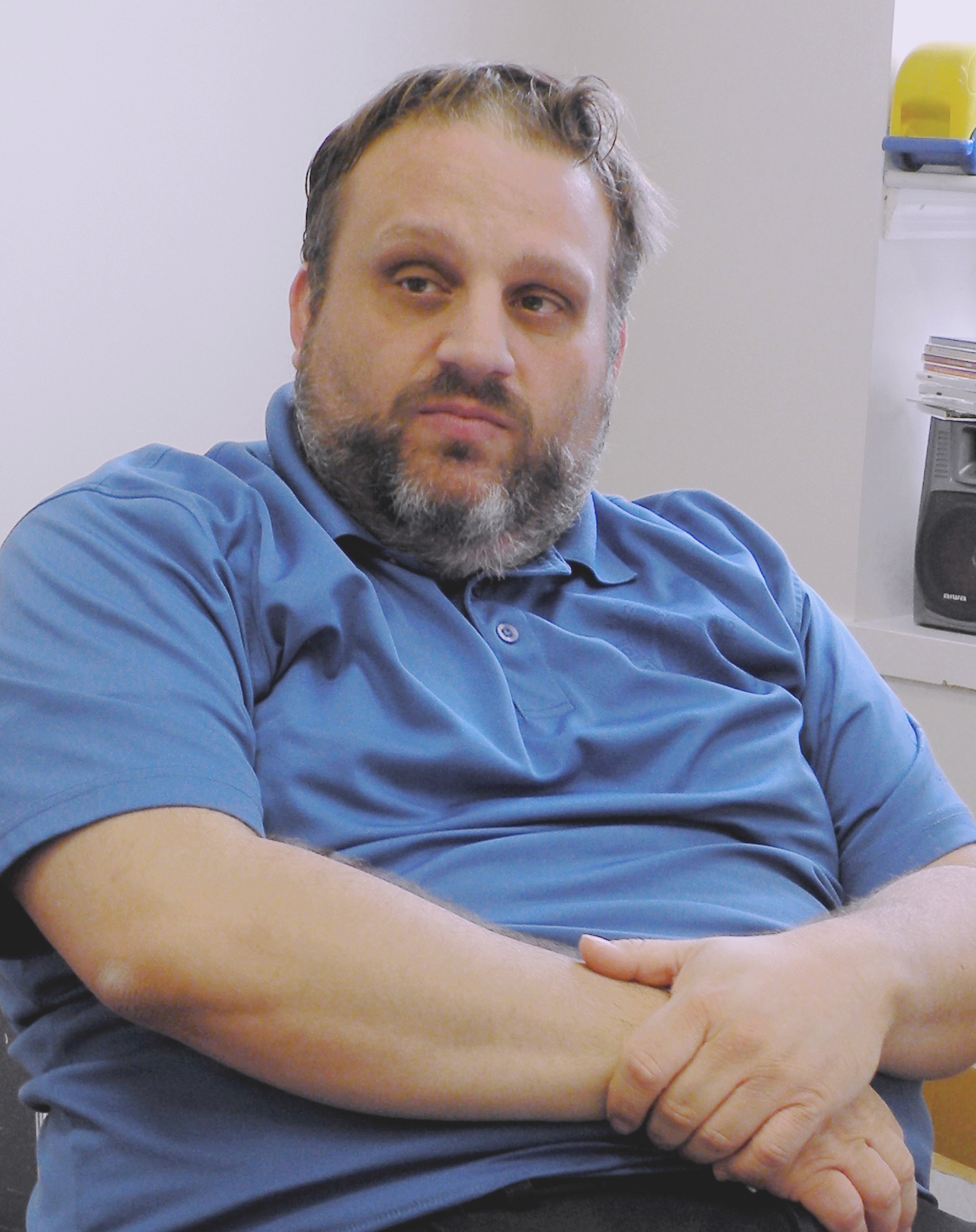
- Finegold in 2013

Personal information
- Born: Benjamin Philip Finegold; September 6, 1969 (age 57) Detroit, Michigan, U.S.
- Spouses: Gina Lynne LoSasso (m. 1989, divorced) Kelly Finegold (m. 2001, divorced) Karen Boyd (m. 2016)

Chess career
- Country: United States
- Title: Grandmaster (2009)
- Peak rating: 2563 (January 2006)

Twitch information
- Channel: itsBenandKaren
- Years active: 2018–present
- Genre: Gaming
- Game: Chess
- Followers: 133,000

YouTube information
- Channel: GMBenjaminFinegold
- Subscribers: 150,000
- Views: 36,898,919

Benjamin Philip Finegold (born September 6, 1969) is an American chess grandmaster and YouTuber/Twitch streamer. He had previously been nicknamed the "strongest International Master in the United States" until receiving his Grandmaster (GM) title in 2009.

Finegold became a USCF Master at the age of 14, Life Master (USCF) at 15, Senior Master (USCF) at 16, International Master (FIDE) at 20, and Grandmaster (FIDE) at 40.

Finegold was recipient of the U.S. Chess Trust's Samford fellowship. In addition to filming and streaming chess topics on social media sites, he has been active in giving live tournament commentary, lectures, and writing. He was the grandmaster-in-residence of the Saint Louis Chess Club, and co-founded the Chess Club and Scholastic Center of Atlanta.

== Early life ==
Finegold was born in Detroit, Michigan, into a chess family, the son of chess master Ron Finegold and his wife Rita. He learned the rules of chess at age 5 and received his first USCF rating at age 6.

Stuart Rachels says that when he was twelve he saw Ben Finegold and his father Ron hustling in a chess club in Manhattan, offering 8:1 money bets on one-minute-per-player bullet games.

Finegold graduated high school in June 1986 at the age of 16. Afterward, he moved to Columbus, Ohio, to pursue chess.

== Career ==
Finegold said he had played in hundreds of tournament games a year when he was young: "I loved chess and if I lost it did not matter to me. That's the main thing you have to do to get better at chess – if you lose hundreds of games in a row, that's OK."

Finegold received the U.S. Chess Trust's Samford fellowship in 1993.

Finegold tied for first place in the 1994 (Chicago, Illinois) and 2007 (Cherry Hill, New Jersey) U.S. Open Chess Championships. He tied for first (and achieved a grandmaster norm) in the 2002 World Open (Philadelphia, Pennsylvania), and also tied for first in the 2005 and 2008 National Open Chess Championships (Las Vegas, Nevada). He was ranked as one of the top 40 players in the United States on the August 2013 USCF rating list. Finegold has played in nine U.S. Chess Championships: 1994 (Key West, Florida), 1999 (Salt Lake City, Utah), 2002 (Seattle, Washington), 2005 (La Jolla, California), 2006 (San Diego, California), 2008 (Tulsa, Oklahoma), 2010 (Saint Louis, Missouri), 2011 (Saint Louis, Missouri), and 2013 (Saint Louis, Missouri).

In 2000, Finegold co-authored a chess book with chess master Bob Ciaffone, titled Smith–Morra Gambit Finegold Defense.

In September 2009, he earned his third and final grandmaster norm at the SPICE Cup in Lubbock, Texas. Finegold's USCF rating has been "as high as 2662, at which point he was neck and neck with GM Larry Christiansen for the distinction of being the highest rated American born chess player in the country."

=== Broadcasting career ===
Finegold has been a live commentator at the U.S. Chess Championship, U.S. Junior Chess Championship, Sinquefield Cup, and Chess World Cup. He also frequently gave lively and often humorous instructional lectures at the Saint Louis Chess Club (formerly the Chess Club and Scholastic Center of Saint Louis). He was the grandmaster-in-residence of the Saint Louis Chess Club until August 14, 2012, where he filmed a number of chess YouTube videos. In 2017, Finegold and his wife Karen co-founded the Chess Club and Scholastic Center of Atlanta. Finegold's lectures are available on the YouTube channels of the Saint Louis Chess Club as well as the channel of the Chess Club and Scholastic Center of Atlanta and on Twitch.

As of 2021, Finegold streams chess five to six times a week, particularly on Twitch under the handle "itsBenAndKaren"; his account currently has over 133,000 followers. Highlights and clips from his Twitch streams are regularly uploaded to his YouTube channel with the same name. As of January 2025, his YouTube channel has over 150,000 subscribers. He also has a Twitter account, with more than 21,900 followers as of March 2023.

As of June 2023, Finegold has appeared five times as a guest on the Perpetual Chess Podcast hosted by National Master Ben Johnson.

== Personal life ==
Finegold was a student at Wayne State University.

In July 1988, Finegold moved to Brussels, Belgium, with Gina Lynne LoSasso, one of the top female players in the U.S. Finegold and Gina married in January 1989 in Hastings, England. They have a son, Spencer Finegold, who is a chess National Master. He met his second wife, Kelly, on the Internet Chess Club. They married in March 2001 and have a daughter, Erum. He is currently living with his third wife, Karen Boyd, a chess player with a background in programming.

Finegold became a vegetarian in 1986 and has been vegan since New Year's Day 2019. He regularly advocates for veganism in his live streams and is active in online communities with similar ideals about animal rights.

Finegold has tardive dyskinesia.

== Publications ==
- Starting Out with 1.d4 (2023) on Chessable
- Starting Out: Sicilian (2023) on Chessable
- Starting Out: Nimzo-Indian Defense (2024) on Chessable
- Sicilian Surprise: Neo-Boleslavsky Variation (2025) on Chessable
