= Emily Nguyen =

American chess player (born 2002)

Personal information
- Born: Emily Quynh Nguyen; July 19, 2002 (age 23) Austin, Texas

Chess career
- Country: United States
- Title: Woman International Master (2016)
- Peak rating: 2299 (October 2019)

Emily Quynh Nguyen (born July 19, 2002) is an American chess player and a Woman International Master.

== Career ==
Nguyen started playing chess competitively at a young age. Her early successes included winning the 2010 U.S. Junior Open (Open Under 8), the 2011 North American Youth Chess Championship (Girls Under 10), and the 2012 Pan-American Youth Chess Championship (Girls Under 12).

In 2016, she won the U.S. Junior Girls' Championship with a score of 6½/9, earning an invitation to the 2017 U.S. Women's Championship. She also won the 2016 North American Junior Girls' Championship, held in Dallas, Texas, with a score of 8/9, earning the FIDE title of Woman International Master. Nguyen competed in the U.S. Women's Chess Championship for the first time in 2017; she finished 12th out of 12, scoring 1 point out of 11. In 2019, she scored 2½/11, again finishing in 12th. In August 2019, at the age of 16, she became the second female chess player ever to win the chess tournament called the Denker Tournament of High School Champions (Abby Marshall having become the first female chess player to win in 2009 at age 18) after tying for first place with Bryce Tiglon and Ben Li. In 2020, Nguyen placed 7th at the U.S. Women's Chess Championship after scoring 5/11 points.

Nguyen studied at Stanford University.
