= A.T. Bigelow =

American chess player

Dr. Alexander Thompson Bigelow (born 1841; died 1923) was an American chess master.

Bigelow was the City Champion of Saint Paul, Minnesota in 1901. He played several times in the U.S. Open Chess Championship; tied for 9-10th in Excelsior, Minnesota, in 1901, took 8th at Excelsior 1902, tied for 9-10th at Chicago 1903, took 10th at Excelsior 1905, took 14th at Excelsior 1907, and took 4th at Excelsior 1908 (elim.).
