= Mackenzie Molner =

American chess grandmaster (born 1988)

Personal information
- Born: August 1, 1988 (age 37) Montclair, New Jersey, U.S.

Chess career
- Country: United States
- Title: Grandmaster (2013)
- FIDE rating: 2458 (July 2026)
- Peak rating: 2528 (March 2014)

Mackenzie "Mac" Molner (born August 1, 1988) is an American chess grandmaster and chess instructor. Chess coach Michael Khodarkovsky helped Molner develop his competitive chess play. Molner won the Denker Tournament of High School Champions as a sophomore in 2004. He completed his final grandmaster norm in 2013, tying for first in the U.S. Open Chess Championship, held near Madison, Wisconsin that year.

== Biography ==
Born in Montclair, New Jersey in 1988, Molner learned how to play chess during summer camp at the age of seven. Molner achieved individual and team success throughout his scholastic career, winning a national team championship in 8th grade, and many other strong finishes at the state and national level.

Molner attended Montclair High School and played varsity soccer.

As a sophomore in 2004, he tied for first place in the Denker Tournament of High School Champions with Pietta Garrett (Arizona), going undefeated in the last three rounds.

Molner graduated from high school in 2006 and matriculated at New York University. While a student, he represented the United States in the World Junior Chess Championship held in Yerevan, Armenia in 2007. He quickly became known for his unique, wildly aggressive style, earning the FIDE title of International Master while at university. In 2008 Molner also won the New Jersey State Chess Championship for the first time at age 19.

== Chess career ==
After graduating from college, Molner continued to play professionally. He moved to Arizona. He achieved his first grandmaster norm in 2010 and received the title of grandmaster in 2013 soon after tying for first in the 114th United States Open Chess Championship, held in Madison, (actually, in the suburb of Middleton) Wisconsin. He went undefeated and tied for first place along with Joshua Friedel and Julio Sadorra and only lost the title of individual champion to Joshua Friedel in a tiebreak playoff.

He won the award for the United States Chess League's most improved player award in 2011 and was featured in several "Games of the Week".

In 2014, Molner was accepted as the 2014 U.S. Championship at-large wildcard. Shortly afterward, he received his final grandmaster norm in 2013, gaining 150 rating points since 2013, and being ranked 27th in the United States. He finished the championship with seven draws and four losses.

In 2015, he tied for second in the 116th United States Open Chess Championship, held in Phoenix, Arizona, winning in 6 out of the 9 rounds and drawing three times.

In 2017, Molner won the 70th New Jersey State Championship Tournament for the second time.

Molner has earned all his international master and grandmaster norms in the United States. While earning his norms, he often played aggressive openings like the Evans Gambit, Blumenfeld Gambit, Pirc Defense, and the Gruenfeld Defense.

Molner has played for three teams in the United States Chess League, including:

- New Jersey Knockouts
- New York Knights
- Arizona Scorpions

Molner co-founded - and currently plays for - the Montclair Sopranos in the PRO Chess League

== Chess instructor ==
Molner has coached in international tournaments such as the World Youth Team held in Al Ain in the United Arab Emirates. In 2015, his pupils in the school program where he taught won 1st place in the State Scholastic Championship in all divisions, from grades K–1 through K–9.

Molner left Arizona and returned to his hometown, Montclair, New Jersey, in 2015 and remains active in the chess community in the New Jersey and New York City area. He started the GMac Chess Academy and continues to coach and mentor chess enthusiasts. He is also active in the West Orange Chess Club.

== Personal ==
Molner completed his undergraduate degree, and earned a Bachelor of Arts from New York University in foreign languages, specializing in Romance Languages, specifically Italian and Spanish (he also speaks German, French and Russian).

On top of chess, Molner is an avid poker player and has played professionally. Mac placed third in the 2007 5th Annual East Coast Poker Championships, on May 11, 2007.
