= Julio Sadorra =

Filipino chess grandmaster (born 1986)

Personal information
- Born: Julio Catalino Sadorra; September 14, 1986 (age 39) Bacoor, Cavite

Chess career
- Country: Philippines
- Title: Grandmaster (2011)
- FIDE rating: 2547 (September 2026)
- Peak rating: 2611 (May 2014)

Julio Catalino Sadorra (born September 14, 1986) is a Filipino chess grandmaster. He competed in the FIDE World Cup in 2017 where he was seeded 101 and where he lost to the 28th-seeded Super GM Maxim Matlakov, 0.5-1.5. Sadorra has represented the Philippines at the Chess Olympiad since 2014. He tied for first place in the U.S. Open Chess Championship in 2013.

== Personal ==
In 2009, Sadorra moved to the United States to pursue an education. He attended the University of Texas at Dallas on a chess scholarship, where he was a team member that went to the Final Four twice. He graduated with a bachelor's degree in Business Administration in 2013, and received the title of Grandmaster while pursuing his studies.

== Chess career ==
In 2008, then still an International Master (IM), Sadorra played for the Club Intchess Team of Singapore in the 1st Asian Club Chess Cup held in Al-Ain, Abu Dhabi, UAE, manning Board 2 with an ELO of 2431 where he scored 4.0/7 (+4 =0 -3) for a 57.1% winning rate and a Tournament Performance Rating (TPR) of 2400. The team ended in 9th place among 30 teams.

GM Sadorra tied for first in the 2013 US Open held in Madison, Wisconsin from July 27-August 4. His eight wins and one loss put him on 8/9 and he finished tied with eventual winner GM Joshua Friedel and IM Mackenzie Molner (now GM after completing his final GM norm at this event). Friedel and Molner advanced on tiebreaks to a blitz playoff, which Friedel won as Sadorra eventually finished in 3rd place. He also won the Continental class(2) championship at Virginia in June 2016.

In 2017, he tied for first with fellow Filipino GM Mark Paragua in the 9th Annual Chesapeake Open with a record of 6-1 (+5 =2 -0) in the tournament that employed no tie-breaks. Sadorra and Paragua each won US$1,100.00 for their first place tie.

He has coached for the North Texas Chess Academy and UT Dallas. Sadorra was part of the University of Texas (UT) Dallas team that won the Pan-American Intercollegiate Championship in 2010, 2011 and 2012.

=== Chess Olympiad ===
GM Sadorra has already played for Team Philippines thrice in the Chess Olympiad, 2014, 2016 and 2018 editions where he played Board 1 in all three (3) olympiads:

- In the 41st Chess Olympiad held in Tromso, Norway, as the Board 1 player with an ELO of 2590, Sadorra scored 6.5 points playing all 11 games winning 4 with 5 draws and 2 losses for a 59.1% winning rate and a TPR of 2593 where he placed 36th among all Board 1 players. He led the team to a 46th place finish.
- In the 42nd Chess Olympiad held in Baku, Azerbaijan, Sadorra again played top board for Team Philippines with his 2560 ELO where he recorded 5/8 posting 3 wins, 4 draws and 1 loss for a winning rate of 62.5% and a high TPR of 2687. As Board 1 player he had a draw with world champion Magnus Carlsen of Norway in the 6th round. He placed 38th among all participants in the top board and led the team to 58th position.
- At the 43rd Chess Olympiad conducted at Batumi, Georgia, Sadorra played Board 1 for the third straight olympiad with his ELO of 2553 where he contributed 5 wins, 5 draws and a single loss on the way to scoring 7.5/11 with a winning rate of 68.2% and a TPR of 2575 leading the team to 37th place.

After the 2018 edition, Sadorra has already recorded 12 wins, 14 draws and 4 losses for a total of 19 points in 30 games (63.3%).

=== Asian Individual Chess Championship ===
Sadorra has already taken part in four (4) editions of the Asian Individual Chess Championship also known as the Asian Continental Championship:

- In the 2007 (6th) Cebu City Asian Chess Championship where Sadorra finished the 11-round Swiss System event in 54th place in a field of 72 players with 4.5/11 by recording 3 wins, 3 draws and 5 losses with a TPR of 2377 which was below his ELO then of 2421;
- In the 2009 (7th) Subic Bay Freeport Zone Asian Chess Championship where he finished in 55th place in the 86-player field that competed in the 11-round Swiss System event scoring 5.0/11 with 3 wins, 4 draws and 4 losses putting up a TPR of 2446 almost equal to his 2451 ELO;
- At the 2013 (11th) Manila Asian Chess Championship where he played well by placing 7th in this 9-round Swiss System event featuring 77 players where he finished with a score of 6.0/9 posting 5 wins, 2 draws and 2 losses for a very high TPR of 2652 as compared to his 2561 ELO at that time; and at the
- 2017 (15th) Chengdu Asian Chess Championship where he finished with a score of 6 points in the 9-round Swiss System tournament on the strength of 4 wins, 4 draws and 1 loss tying for 5th-9th places ultimately placing 6th overall with a TPR of 2685 with an ELO of 2575.

Overall, Sadorra already has a total of 21½ points in 40 games (53.8% winning percentage) on the strength of 15 wins, 13 draws and 12 losses.

=== PRO Chess League ===
He has taken part in two (2) editions of the PRO Chess League:

- 2018 edition where he played for the Dallas Destiny where he scored 16.5 points in 24 games with 14 wins, 5 draws and 5 losses (68.8% winning rate). Among his notable wins in the tournament is a victory against GM Anton Smirnov of Australia who played for the Australia Kangaroos. Sadorra had a TPR of 2608 as compared to his 2574 ELO that time.
- 2019 edition where he played this time for the Seattle Sluggers where he scored 2 points in 4 games (2 wins and 2 losses) in their game against the San Jose Hackers (wins over GM Eltaj Safarli and Vinesh Ravuri and losses versus IM Prasanna Raghuram Rao and Super GM Rauf Mamedov) and with a TPR of 2473 as against his 2553 ELO.

=== Other notable tournaments ===
Sadorra, still an IM then, took part in the 10th Dubai Open (2008) held on April 6–15, 2008 and won by fellow Filipino (at that time) GM Wesley So where he finished in a tie for 40th-56th places eventually ending up in 42nd place scoring 5.0/9 posting 4 wins, 2 draws and 3 losses with a TPR of 2387 as opposed to his ELO then of 2455. His 2 draws were against highly-rated GMs Li Chao of China (2581) and David Arutinian of Georgia (2593) in the 4th and 5th rounds, respectively.

GM Sadorra participated in the 112th US Open, a 9-round Swiss System event held from July 30 - August 7, 2011 at Orlando, Florida where he tied for 14th-35th places with a score of 6.5/9 (5 wins, 3 draws and 1 loss) where he had an ELO of 2561.

Sadorra won the 3rd Washington Chess Congress held on October 5–16, 2016 in Arlington, Virginia. He actually ended up in a tie with 4 others: GM Gil Popilski, IM Lui Ruifeng, GM Andrey Stukopin and FM David Brodsky all with 6.5/9 (5W 3D 1L) but won the title with better tie-breaks (43). He won the top prize of US$1,900.00.

GM Sadorra, together with GM John Paul Gomez, represented the Philippines in the 5th Asian Indoor and Martial Arts Games Blitz Men (Chess) held in Ashgabat, Turkmenistan on September 17–27, 2017 where the team placed 7th overall with 1 win and 4 draws with Sadorra scoring 3.0/5 with 2 wins, 2 draws and 1 loss as Board 1 player.
