= List of people from Westminster, Colorado =

Coordinates: 39.8367°N 105.0372°W

Location of Westminster in Colorado

This is a list of some notable people who have lived in the City of Westminster, Colorado, United States.

== Arts and entertainment ==
=== Film, television, and theatre ===
- Frank Caeti (1973– ), actor and comedian
- George D. "Pete" Morrison (1890–1973), silent film actor

=== Music ===
- Bryan Erickson (1972– ), electronic musician
- Omar Espinosa (1984– ), musician and composer

== Business ==
- Frank Willis Mayborn (1903–1987), newspaper publisher

== Politics ==
=== National ===
- Don Leroy Bonker (1937–2023), U.S. representative from Washington
- Roy Harrison McVicker (1924–1973), U.S. representative from Colorado

=== State ===
- Evie Hudak (1951– ), Colorado state legislator
- Cherylin Peniston (1948– ), Colorado state legislator
- Robert Ramirez, Colorado state legislator
- Pat Steadman (1964– ), Colorado state legislator

== Religion ==
- Alma Bridwell White (1862–1946), founder and bishop of the Pillar of Fire Church
- Donald Justin Wolfram (1919–2003), general superintendent of the Pillar of Fire Church

== Sports ==
- Trevor Amann (1998– ), soccer player
- Chad Ashton (1967- ), professional soccer player, head soccer coach University of Denver and MLS D.C. United
- Pat Barry (1979– ),former kickboxer and MMA fighter
- Mariah Bell (1996– ), figure skater
- Sean Jarrett (1983– ), baseball pitcher
- Derrick Martin (1985– ), football safety
- Michael A. Mulyar (1978– ), chess master
- Rose Namajunas (1992– ), mixed martial artist and former UFC champion
- Lars Sullivan (1988– ), former WWE wrestler and adult film actor

== See also ==
- List of people from Colorado
- Bibliography of Colorado
- Geography of Colorado
- History of Colorado
- Index of Colorado-related articles
- List of Colorado-related lists
- Outline of Colorado
