= Albert Sandrin Jr. =

American chess player

Albert Sandrin Jr. (25 April 1923 – 12 February 2004) was an American chess master.

He won the 1949 U.S. Open in Omaha, and took 2nd in the 1951 U.S. Open in Fort Worth. He won the Illinois State Championship in 1944 and the Chicago Championship in 1946, 1949, 1957, and 1968.

Sandrin had pigmentary degeneration of the retina. He was already almost completely blind at the time of the 1949 U.S. Open. After the founding of the International Braille Chess Association (IBCA) in 1958, he represented the U.S. in the World Blind Championships of 1970 and 1982, and played first board for the U.S. team in the Blind Olympiads of 1968, 1972, and 1980 (and second board in 1976). His game against Sean Loftus of Ireland in the 1968 event won a Best Game Prize; the game score with notes is given in the IBCA History. He won the U.S. Braille Chess Association (USBCA) championships in 1974, 1982, and 1984.
