= Christopher Langan =

American autodidact (born 1952)

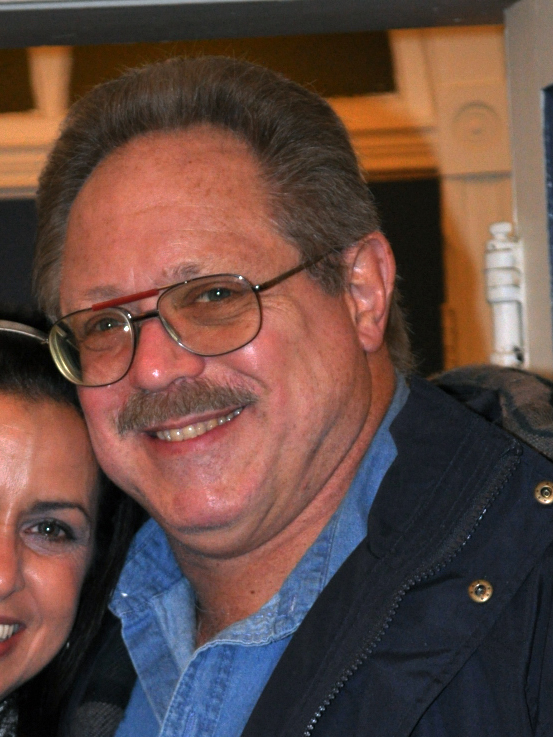
- Langan in 2017
- Born: March 25, 1952 (age 74); San Francisco, California, U.S.
- Occupation: Horse rancher
- Known for: Purported high IQ
- Spouse: Gina Lynne LoSasso

Christopher Michael Langan (born March 25, 1952) is an American horse rancher who claims to have an extremely high intelligence and a high score on his second attempt of the Mega Test, a self-administered, untimed, non-standardized IQ test developed by an amateur psychometrician that he took as a bouncer in Long Island, New York, under the pseudonym Eric Hart. Langan is known additionally for claiming to have discovered a scientific and mathematical "theory of everything" that proves the existence of god, the soul, and the afterlife. Under the aforementioned pseudonym, Langan was formerly listed in the Guinness Book of Records high IQ section alongside Marilyn vos Savant and Keith Raniere, who had taken the same test. The record was discontinued in 1990, as high IQs are considered too unreliable to document as world records. Langan was later a subject of Malcolm Gladwell's 2008 book Outliers: The Story of Success, in which Gladwell discussed why Langan's reputation for high intelligence had not led to greater conventional success. Langan has no degree, having twice dropped out of college. The book compared him with J. Robert Oppenheimer and focused on the influence of their respective environments on success.

Langan has formulated and promoted the Cognitive-Theoretic Model of the Universe (CTMU), which he describes as a theory in which reality is a self-simulation. He self-published a book about it in 2002. In interviews and self-published writings, he has expressed beliefs in a variety of fringe proposals and conspiracy theories, including arguing in favor of eugenics to prevent "genomic degradation", opposition to interracial relationships, and support for the 9/11 truth movement. His political opinions have gained him a following in far-right politics.

== Biography ==
Langan was born in 1952 in San Francisco, California. His mother, Mary Langan-Hansen (née Chappelle, 1932–2014), was the daughter of a wealthy shipping executive but was cut off from her family. Langan's biological father left before he was born, and is said to have died in Mexico. Langan's mother married three more times, and had a son by each husband. Her second husband was murdered, and her third killed himself. Langan grew up with the fourth husband Jack Langan, who has been described as a "failed journalist" who used a bullwhip as a disciplinary measure and went on drinking sprees, disappearing from the house, locking the kitchen cabinets so the four boys could not get to the food in them. The family was very poor; Langan recalls that they all had only one set of clothes each. The family moved around, living for a while in a teepee on an Indian reservation, then later in Virginia City, Nevada. When the children were in grade school, the family moved to Bozeman, Montana, where Langan spent most of his childhood.

Langan attended high school, but spent his last years engaged mostly in independent study. He did so after his teachers denied his request for more challenging material. According to Langan, he began teaching himself "advanced math, physics, philosophy, Latin, and Greek". He earned a perfect score on the SAT despite taking a nap during the test.

Langan was offered two full scholarships, one to Reed College in Oregon and the other to the University of Chicago. He chose the former, which he later called "a big mistake". He had a "real case of culture shock" in the unfamiliar urban setting. He explained that in his first semester he earned all As but that he lost his scholarship after his mother did not send in the necessary financial information. Langan withdrew before final exams in his second semester and received all Fs.

Langan returned to Bozeman and worked as a forest service firefighter for 18 months before enrolling at Montana State University–Bozeman. Faced with financial and transportation problems, and believing that he could teach his professors more than they could teach him, he dropped out. He took a string of labor-intensive jobs for some time, and by his mid-40s had been a construction worker, cowboy, forest service ranger, farmhand, and, for over twenty years, a bouncer on Long Island. He also worked for the technology company Virtual Logistix.

In comparing the lack of academic and life success of Langan to the successes of J. Robert Oppenheimer, journalist Malcolm Gladwell, in his 2008 book Outliers, points to the background and social skills of the two men. Oppenheimer was raised in a wealthy cosmopolitan environment, and Gladwell argues that such an environment gave help along the way and allowed Oppenheimer to gain a social savvy that Langan lacked, and prevented him from progressing academically. He had had little or no guidance from his parents or his teachers, and never developed the social skills needed to cope with and overcome his challenges.

In 1999, Langan and others formed a non-profit corporation named the Mega Foundation for those with IQs of 164 or above. He went through litigation with the Mega Society over use of its name, Mega Society East, and his publication of a journal also called Noesis. He was required to cease use of the Mega Society East name but retained control of the Mega Foundation domain names. Under the auspices of the Mega Foundation, he sat on the Society of Fellows of the International Society for Complexity, Information, and Design (ISCID), an intelligent design advocacy organisation, until its dissolution.

In 2008, he appeared on the game show 1 vs. 100 and won $250,000. He used the proceeds to purchase a horse farm in Missouri, where he now lives with his wife Gina (née LoSasso), a clinical neuropsychologist.

== IQ testing ==
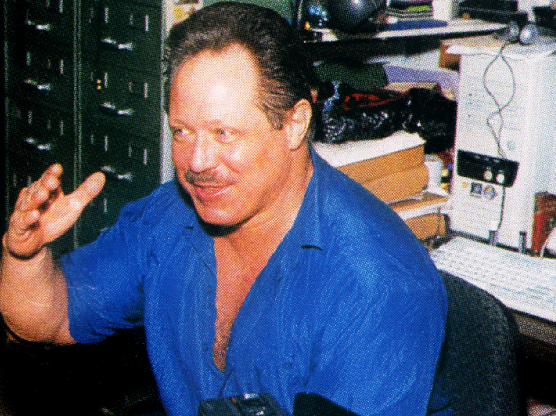
Langan in 2014

In 1986, Langan took the Mega Test, a self-administered, untimed IQ test, under the pseudonym Eric Hart; this score admitted him to membership of the Hoeflin Research Group, later to become the Mega Society. He continued to use that pseudonym for some time in his membership of the Mega Society, and was listed in the Guinness Book of Records along with Marilyn vos Savant and Keith Raniere as one of three people to have scored so highly on the test. It later transpired that Langan, among others, had taken the Mega Test more than once by using a pseudonym. His first test score, under the name Langan, was 42 out of 48, below the Mega Society membership threshold of 43; his second attempt, as Hart, was 47. The Mega Test was designed only to be taken once. A score of 42 on the Mega Test was originally designed to yield a predicted IQ value of 173–174, although data analysed from test takers led to a renorming of this and a 163–174 range. Further renorming work has suggested the range may be 159–169.

IQ testing at the tail of the normal distribution has been criticised as being dubious as there are insufficient normative cases upon which to base a statistically justified rank-ordering. The Mega Test, among other IQ tests, has been criticised for blurring specific domain knowledge with generalised intelligence, although "most psychologists can agree that they measure something valuable."

The Mega Test's attempt to measure high IQ at the tail of the normal distribution has been academically evaluated. Although it is an innovative attempt to create a test that would evaluate very high IQ, the nature of the test—self administered without time limit, which was chosen for pragmatic reasons—would not necessarily measure general intelligence, but could measure resourcefulness or some other factor. The frequent renorming of the test by its author was non standard but also innovative. Nevertheless it contained well known statistical flaws, such as sample self selection. The analysis could not therefore validate the conclusions. Attempts to eke out discrimination at the hundredth or thousandth percentile were clearly overwhelmed by the test's standard error, given that there were only 48 questions. The questions, too, were criticised for being structured with insufficient sensitivity to the detection of knowledge, because of the question format used. The test was thus described not so much as number crunching, but as "nothing short of number pulverisation". Mensa, the high IQ society, never accepted Mega Test scores as proof of meeting the entry requirement for the society.

In 1990, the Guinness Book of Records dropped the listing of highest IQ, deeming high IQ scores to be too unreliable to document.

== Cognitive-Theoretic Model of the Universe ==
Langan has proposed a thesis he calls the Cognitive-Theoretic Model of the Universe (CTMU) which, he maintains, "explains the connection between mind and reality, therefore the presence of cognition and universe in the same phrase". He self-published an 85-page book on his ideas in 2002 and revised it in 2020. A version of this was published in 2002 in Progress in Complexity, Information, and Design, the online journal of the ISCID, an intelligent-design organisation. He refers to it as "a true 'theory of everything', a cross between John Archibald Wheeler's 'Participatory Universe' and Stephen Hawking's 'Imaginary Time' theory of cosmology", additionally contending that with the CTMU he "can prove the existence of God, the soul and an afterlife, using mathematics."

== Political views ==
Langan has spoken about his personal and political views in a series of interviews, and has published his views on various matters in the book FAQs About Reality (2021). Asked what he would do if he were in charge, Langan stated his first priority would be to set up an "anti-dysgenics" project, and would prevent people from "breeding as incontinently as they like." He argues that this would be to practice "genetic hygiene to prevent genomic degradation and reverse evolution" owing to technological advances suspending the process of natural selection.

Langan's support of conspiracy theories, including the 9/11 Truther movement, as well as his opposition to interracial relationships, have contributed to his gaining a following among members of the alt-right and others on the far right. Langan has claimed that the George W. Bush administration staged the 9/11 attacks in order to distract the public from learning about his Cognitive-Theoretic Model of the Universe (CTMU). Journalists have described some of Langan's Internet posts as containing "thinly veiled" antisemitism, making antisemitic "dog whistles", and being "incredibly racist".

== Primary sources ==
- Hart, Eric (April 1986). "Autobiographical Sketch" (PDF). Titania, the Journal of the Titan Society (2): 3.
- Langan, Christopher Michael (June 1, 2002). The Cognitive-Theoretic Model of the Universe: A New Kind of Reality Theory. Mega Foundation Press. ISBN 978-0-9719162-2-7.
- Langan, Christopher (July 24, 2020). "First Person" (Interview). Interviewed by Errol Morris.
- Langdon, Kevin (March 2002). "Reply to Glen Wooton". Noesis (156).
