= Fabian Doettling =

German chess grandmaster (born 1980)

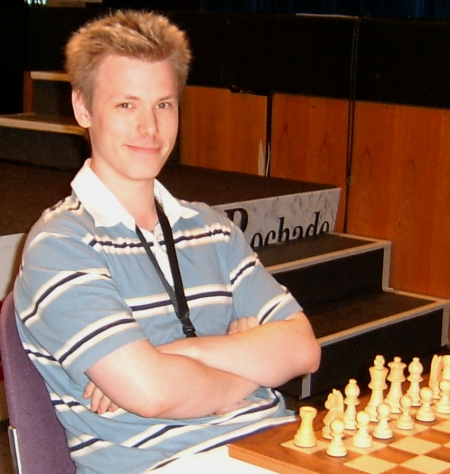
- Fabian Doettling in 2006

Personal information
- Born: 4 August 1980 (age 45) Heilbronn, Germany

Chess career
- Country: Germany
- Title: Grandmaster (2003)
- FIDE rating: 2593 (July 2026)
- Peak rating: 2592 (April 2022)

Fabian Doettling (born 4 August 1980) is a German chess Grandmaster (2003).

== Biography ==
In 1995, Fabian Doettling won the German Youth Chess Championship in the U15 age group. In 1996, in Rimavská Sobota he won the European Youth Chess Championship in the U16 age group. In 1998, Fabian Doettling ranked 5th in the World Youth Chess Championship in the U18 age group.

In 2000, 2002 and 2003, Fabian Doettling played for the German team at the Men's Chess Mitropa Cup, which in 2002 he won an individual gold medal and team silver medal, but in 2003 he became a winner in the team competition. In 2001, he shared first place in the U.S. Open Chess Championship. In 2003, Fabian Doettling won the International Chess Tournament in Bad Wiessee, but in 2005 he was the first in the International Chess Festival Untergrombach Open. In 2006, he won the International Chess Tournament in Baden-Baden, as well as the Dos Hermanas Online Chess Tournament, in which Fabian Doettling defeated Gata Kamsky, Magnus Carlsen and Bu Xiangzhi.

In German team chess tournaments Fabian Doettling represented the Baden-Baden chess club OSC Baden-Baden. He is a five-time Chess Bundesliga winner (2006-2009, 2011) and a triple winner of the German Chess Cup (2007, 2008, 2015).

In 2000, he was awarded the FIDE International Master (IM) title and received the FIDE Grandmaster (GM) title three years later.
