= Praveen Balakrishnan =

American chess grandmaster (born 2002)

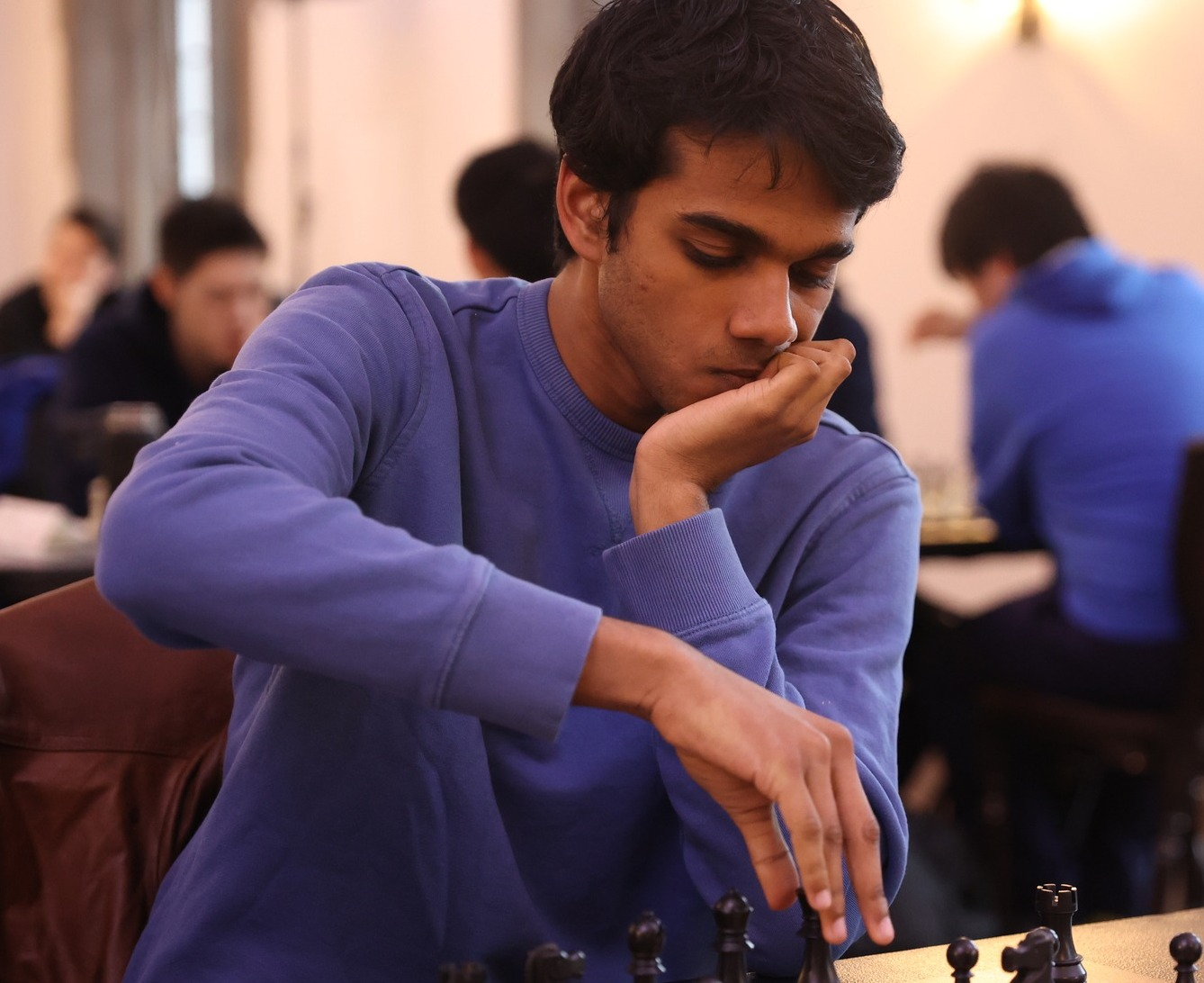
- Praveen Balakrishnan at Hart House, 2023.

Personal information
- Born: May 21, 2002 (age 24) Irvine, California, United States

Chess career
- Country: United States
- Title: Grandmaster (2021)
- FIDE rating: 2500 (October 2026)
- Peak rating: 2529 (January 2023)

Praveen Balakrishnan (born May 21, 2002) is an American chess grandmaster from Centreville, Virginia. He was awarded the title of Grandmaster (GM) by FIDE in 2021, and he is a recipient of the 2021 Samford Fellowship. As of January 2022, he is ranked the 35th best player in the United States.

== Education ==
Balakrishnan attended Thomas Jefferson High School for Science and Technology. As of 2021, he is attending the University of Chicago.

== Chess career ==
Balakrishnan started playing chess when he was 5 years old. At the age of 10, he was awarded the National Master title by USCF. He represented the United States in World Youth Championships in Greece, Slovenia, and South Africa. By the age of 14, he had already received the title of International Master.

In 2017, Balakrishnan won the Denker Tournament of High School Champions, and he defended his title in 2018. He is the only participant to win this tournament back-to-back since 1990.

Balakrishnan won the gold medal at the 2019 North American Junior U20 Championship with a score of 7/9, earning him his 1st GM norm. He then earned his 2nd GM norm by tying for first place in the 2019 U.S. Masters Chess Championship with a score of 6.5/9.

Balakrishnan tied for first place in the Charlotte Chess Center's Thanksgiving 2020 GM Norm Invitational with a score of 6.5/9, bringing his FIDE rating above 2500. He competed in the 2021 US Junior Championship, a round robin tournament with 10 of the best junior chess players in the United States, and he finished in a tie for 2nd place.

In August 2021, Balakrishnan won 1st place at the Jesolo International Chess Festival in Jesolo, Italy, where he scored 7/9 and was a full point ahead of the rest of the field. This earned him his 3rd and final GM norm. FIDE approved his Grandmaster title shortly afterwards in the 2021 3rd FIDE Council Meeting. In March 2023, Praveen, along with Awonder Liang, led their UChicago B team to their second consecutive US Amateur Team North Championship.
