= Leon Stolzenberg =

American chess player

Leon Stolzenberg (18 October 1895 – 25 October 1974) was an American chess player. Stolzenberg had been a medic in the hospital at Tarnopol in World War I. Entering the United States after the war, he became one of the leading national and international correspondence chess players. He was several times Michigan state chess champion, and won the U.S. Open Chess Championship (at that time called the Western Chess Association Tournament) in 1926 and 1928.
