= San Antonio 1972 chess tournament =

The San Antonio Church's Fried Chicken Inc. First International Chess Tournament was a chess competition held in San Antonio, Texas, from November 19 to December 11, 1972. Sponsored by fast food franchise Church's Chicken as a marketing strategy to promote the company and an attempt to capitalize on the rise of the game's popularity in the U.S., the tournament was regarded at the time the strongest chess tournament held in the country since 1924. The list of players invited included famous names like former world champion Tigran Petrosian, regular contenders to the world crown Svetozar Gligoric, Paul Keres and Bent Larsen, and some promising stars, among them Brazilian Henrique da Costa Mecking and future world champion Anatoly Karpov.

== List of participants ==
- Walter Browne
- Donald Byrne
- Mario Campos-Lopez
- Larry Evans
- Svetozar Gligoric
- Vlastimil Hort
- Julio Kaplan
- Paul Keres
- Anatoly Karpov
- Bent Larsen
- Henrique Mecking
- Tigran Petrosian
- Lajos Portisch
- Anthony Saidy
- Kenneth Smith
- Duncan Suttles, whose result earned him his final grandmaster norm

== The tournament ==
As a Category XII event (average rating of 2539), the San Antonio Church's Fried Chicken Inc. First International Chess Tournament was strong enough to be regarded at the time the most important chess competition to be held on American soil since New York 1924. Newly-crowned world champion Bobby Fischer and former champion Boris Spassky were also invited, but declined.

The competition was held at the Hilton Palacio del Rio, where the players also stayed. An open tournament was held alongside the main event, attracting 113 players. Harry Golombek was the tournament director.

The three-way tie for first place among Petrosian, Portisch and Karpov (all with 10½ /15), confirmed the pre-tournament prediction for Petrosian, Portisch's status as a top 10 player, and the arrival of Karpov at the elite level.

== Final crosstable ==
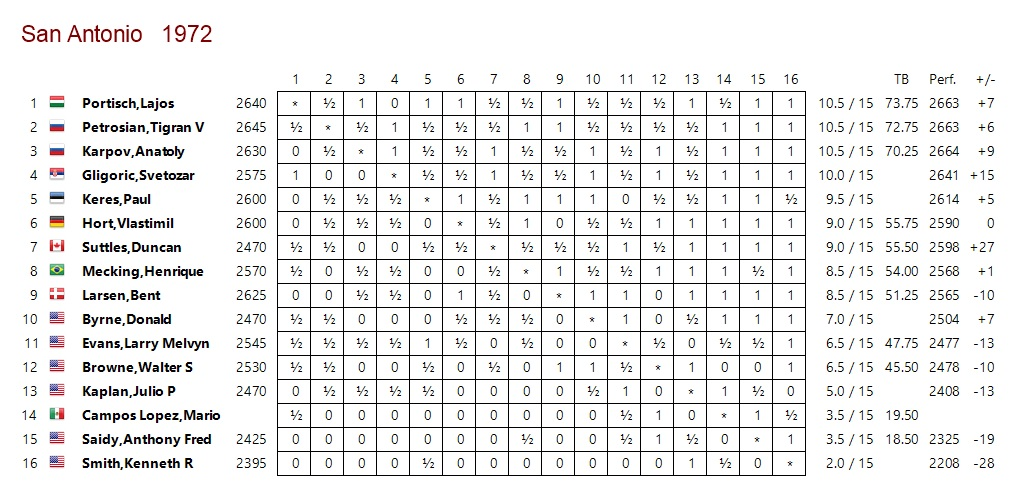
Final crosstable of the '72 San Antonio chess tournament
