= Gabriel Schwartzman =

Romanian-American chess grandmaster (born 1976)

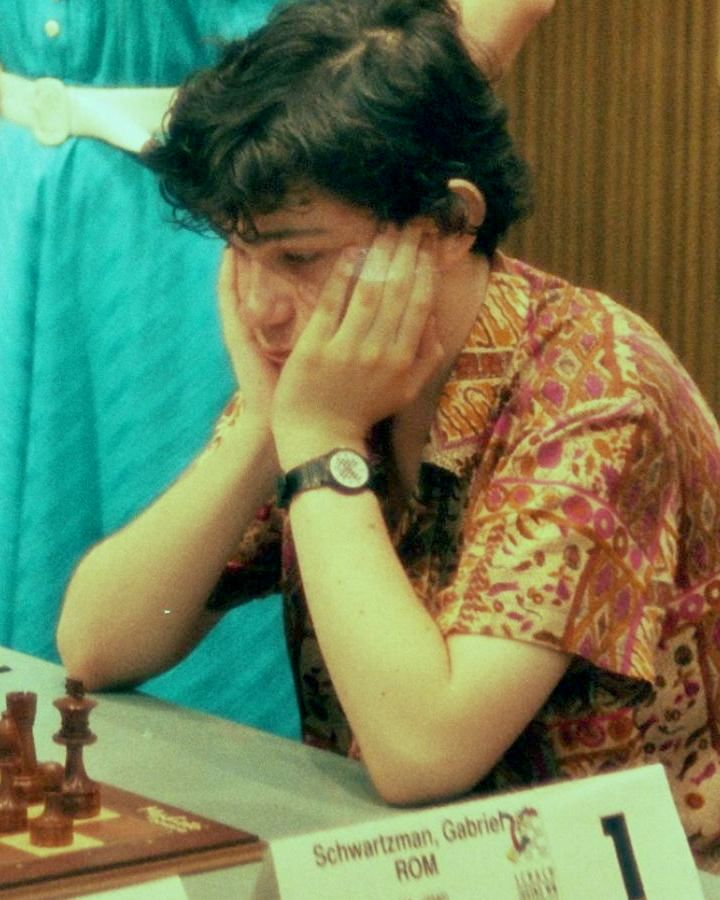
- Gabriel Schwartzman, Duisburg 1992 World Chess Championship under 16

Personal information
- Born: October 23, 1976 (age 50) Bucharest, Romania

Chess career
- Country: Romania (until 1996); United States (since 1996)
- Title: Grandmaster (1993)
- FIDE rating: 2533 (July 2001)
- Peak rating: 2537 (January 2000)

Gabriel Schwartzman (born October 23, 1976) is a Romanian-born American chess grandmaster.

== Biography ==
Originally from Bucharest, Schwartzman moved to Florida, United States. He played in his first chess tournament at the age of 4, and by the age of 12, was FIDE Master title. Three years later, he became an International Master. In November 1993, at the age of 17, he was awarded the International Grandmaster title, making him one of the youngest Grandmasters at the time.

In 1988 he took 2nd, behind Judit Polgár, in the World Under 12 Championship. Schwartzman won the 1996 U.S. Open at the age of 19 (youngest since Bobby Fischer) and was the winner of the Internet World Student Championship. He started the world's first interactive chess school in 1996, the Internet Chess Academy.

Schwartzman has a bachelor's degree with highest honors in finance from the University of Florida and an MBA as Palmer Scholar from the Wharton School of the University of Pennsylvania. Schwartzman retired from chess in 2000 to focus on a career in business.
