= Michael Rohde (chess player) =

American chess grandmaster and attorney-at-law (born 1959)

Personal information
- Born: August 26, 1959 (age 67)

Chess career
- Country: United States
- Title: Grandmaster (1988)
- Peak rating: 2595 (January 1993)
- Peak ranking: No. 49 (July 1987)

Michael Rohde (born August 26, 1959) is an American chess grandmaster and attorney-at-law.

Rohde was rated as a master at thirteen. He gained the International Master title in 1976, followed by that of Grandmaster in 1988. At one point, he was ranked as high as 59th in the world.

In 1975 he was the National Scholastic Chess Champions Junior High School Champion, and the following year he was the High School Champion. He won first place in the U.S. Open in 1991 as well as several other titles. He wrote the "Game of the Month" column for Chess Life from 1991 to 2006.

He is also a three time Marshall Chess Club Champion, winning the title in the years 1990, 1994, and sharing the title as Co-Champion with IM Justin Sarkar in 2012.

Grandmaster Michael Rohde has published widely in Chess Life Magazine, American Chess Magazine, and is the author of The Great Evans Gambit Debate, an opening book advocating for an early Qb3 in the mainlines of the Evans Gambit.

In August 2007, Rohde tied for first in the U.S. Open Championship in Cherry Hill, New Jersey.

More recently, he was featured on Episode 98 of Ben Johnson's Perpetual Chess Podcast.

Rohde is a Chess Coach at Success Academy Charter Schools.
