= Sicilian Defence, Smith–Morra Gambit, Siberian Trap =

Siberian Trap
Position: a8 black rook, c8 black bishop, e8 black king, f8 black bishop, h8 black rook, a7 black pawn, b7 black pawn, c7 black queen, d7 black pawn, f7 black pawn, g7 black pawn, h7 black pawn, c6 black knight, e6 black pawn, c4 white bishop, e4 white pawn, g4 black knight, c3 white knight, f3 white knight, h3 white pawn, a2 white pawn, b2 white pawn, e2 white queen, f2 white pawn, g2 white pawn, a1 white rook, c1 white bishop, f1 white rook, g1 white king
Black wins with 9...Nd4!
- Moves: 1.e4 c5 2.d4 cxd4 3.c3 dxc3 4.Nxc3 Nc6 5.Nf3 e6 6.Bc4 Qc7 7.0-0 Nf6 8.Qe2 Ng4 9.h3??
- ECO: B20
- Named after: Boris Schipkov of Novosibirsk Siberia
- Parent: Sicilian Defence, Smith–Morra Gambit

The Siberian Trap is a chess opening trap. After a series of natural moves in the Smith–Morra Gambit of the Sicilian Defence, White can lose a queen. The name appears to result from Boris Schipkov of Novosibirsk in southwestern Siberia.

The trap has occurred at least twice in tournament play: Kolenbet–Schipkov, Khabarovsk 1987, and Tesinsky–Magerramov, Budapest 1990. It occurred a third time in Rohit–Szabo, Spain 2001.

== Analysis ==
1. e4 c5

The Sicilian Defence.

2. d4 cxd4 3. c3 dxc3

White's 3.c3 introduces the Smith–Morra Gambit. Black accepts the gambit pawn.

4. Nxc3 Nc6 5. Nf3 e6 6. Bc4 Qc7 7. 0-0 Nf6 8. Qe2

White prepares e4–e5. This move is playable if White is careful on the next move. After 8.Re1 Bc5 Black has a good game as White's f2-square is sensitive. White also doesn't achieve much after 8.h3 a6. Instead, NCO suggests 8.Nb5 Qb8 9.e5 Nxe5 10.Nxe5 Qxe5 11.Re1 and White has some compensation for the sacrificed pawns.

8... Ng4! 9. h3?? (see diagram)

This is a decisive mistake. The same fate befell White after 9.Bb3?? in Kramadzhian–Schipkov, Novosibirsk 1988. Another try that doesn't work is 9.Rd1 Bc5. MCO-14 recommends 9.Nb5! Qb8 (threatening 10...a6 11.Nc3 Nd4!) 10.h3 h5 11.g3 Nge5 12.Nxe5 Nxe5 13.Bf4 a6 with a sharp position with roughly equal chances.

9... Nd4!

The Black threat of 10...Nxf3+ followed by 11...Qh2# wins material. If 10.Nxd4 then 10...Qh2#.
