= Joshua Friedel =

American chess grandmaster (born 1986)

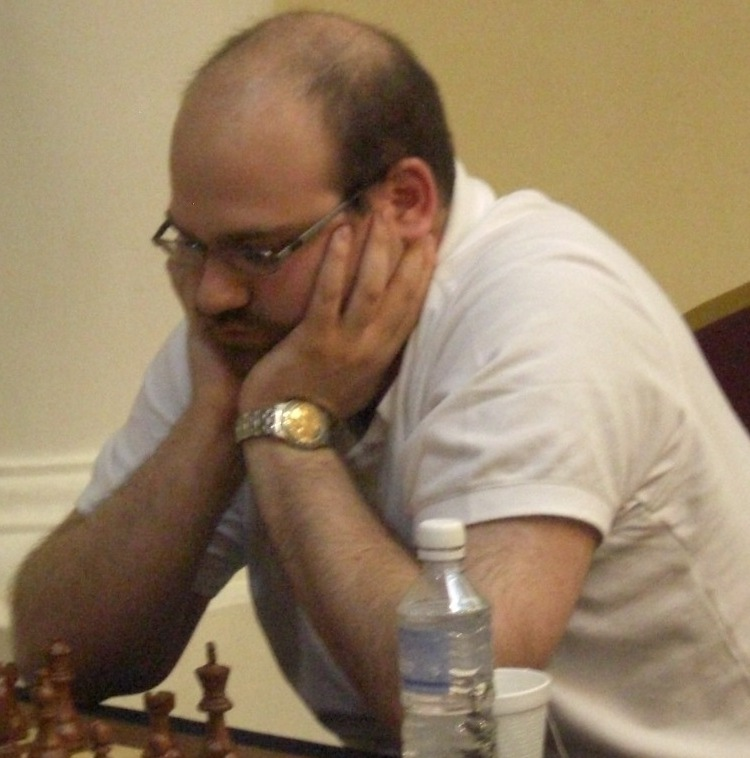
- Friedel at the American Continental Chess Championship in Toluca, April 2011

Personal information
- Born: Joshua Edward Friedel; December 3, 1986 (age 39) Goffstown, New Hampshire, U.S.

Chess career
- Country: United States
- Title: Grandmaster (2008)
- FIDE rating: 2544 (July 2026)
- Peak rating: 2562 (January 2018)

Joshua Edward Friedel (born December 3, 1986) is an American chess player with the FIDE title of Grandmaster. He was the U.S. Open Champion in 2013. He has had notable wins against GMs Hikaru Nakamura, Boris Gulko, Ben Finegold, Timur Gareyev, and Gregory Serper.

== Early life ==
Friedel was born and raised in Goffstown, New Hampshire. He learned to play chess in 1990, at age 3. Three years later, in 1993, at age 6, he became a student under NM Hal Terrie and entered his first tournament that same year.

== Chess career ==
In 1995, at age 8, Friedel won the NH Amateur (U2000) Championship, having the lowest rating in the open section. The next year, in 1996, he won the National K-3 Championship in Tucson, Arizona. As a junior, he was often at the top of his age group, competing in the US Cadet (3 times), Junior Closed (twice), Denker, and World Youth (3) events. He won numerous New England tournaments as well as the US Open Expert Section in 2000 at age 13.

In 2001, after having reached the master level, at age 14, Friedel worked with GMs Larry Christiansen, Gregory Kaidanov, and Alex Goldin. He made International Master (IM) in 2005 and Grandmaster (GM) in 2009. Friedel has been state champion of New Hampshire three times and twice of California. He has also won or tied for first in several open tournaments across the United States, including the Pan Am, Eastern, St. Louis, National, American, and North American Opens.

Friedel has played in six U.S. Closed Championships. At the 2008 event in Tulsa, he tied for fourth and scored his final GM norm. Friedel has competed in numerous international events. He represented the US at the 2008 World Mind Sports Games, as well as at two Continental Championships (2009 and 2011).

In 2009, by tying for 6th at the US Championship in St. Louis, Friedel qualified to compete at the World Cup in Khanty-Mansiysk, Russia. In the same year, he also won the Toronto Open with a perfect 5/5 score and the Edmonton International with 7/9. In 2013, Friedel tied for first at the Chicago Open, also with 7/9.

On August 4, 2013, at the age of 26, Friedel tied for first in the 114th United States Open Chess Championship and eventually winning a tiebreak playoff against Mackenzie Molner.

In March 2016, Friedel won the Manchester Invitational in New Hampshire with a score of 7/10. In December of the same year, he tied for first (winning on tiebreaks) at the North American Open in Las Vegas with a score of 7/9.

In 2017, Friedel won clear first in the B group of the Fall Chess Classic held at the Saint Louis Chess Club and Scholastic Center. He topped the invitational round robin with a score of 6.5/9.

Friedel occasionally writes for Chess Life, Chess Life Online, Saint Louis Public Radio, and other publications.

== See also ==
- U.S. Open Chess Championship
