= Gina Lynne LoSasso =

American chess player (born 1956)

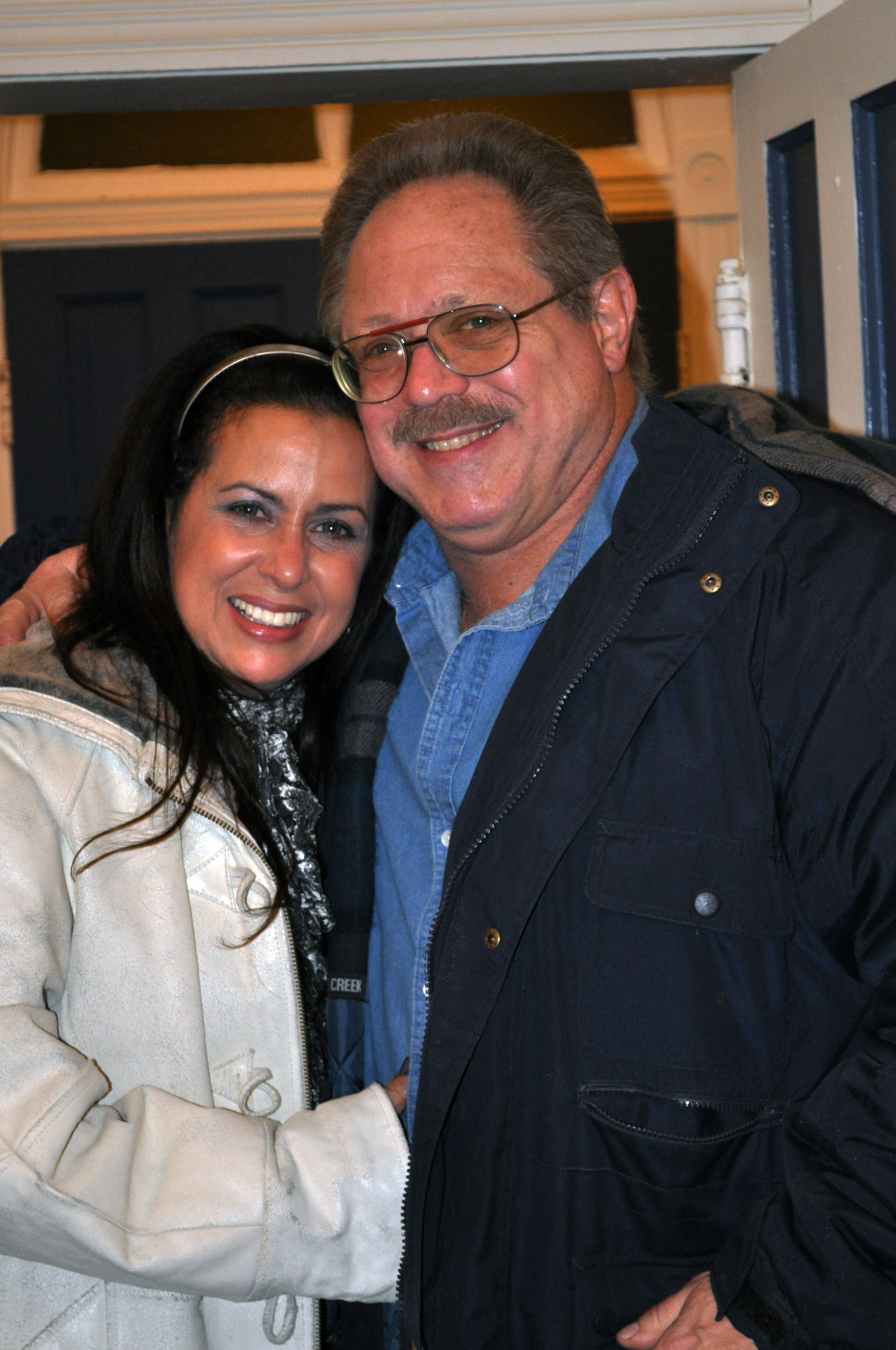
- Gina and Chris Langan in 2017

Personal information
- Born: March 13, 1956 (age 70) New York City, U.S.

Chess career
- Country: United States; Belgium (1989–1994)
- Title: FIDE Woman International Master (1990); ICCF Lady International Master (1993)
- FIDE rating: 2085 (January 1995)
- Peak rating: 2120 (January 1991)
- ICCF rating: 2445 (July 1997)
- ICCF peak rating: 2474 (July 1992)

Gina Lynne LoSasso (born March 13, 1956), formerly known as Gina Linn and also known by her married names Langan and formerly Finegold, is an American chess player who played for the United States and Belgium on the international chess circuit and holds the titles of FIDE title of Woman International Master (WIM, 1990), the USCF title of National Master (NM, 1990), and the ICCF title of Lady International Master (LIM, 1993).

== Biography ==
In the second half of the 1980s, playing as Gina Linn, Gina Lynne LoSasso was one of the leading American female chess players having participated in two US Women's Championships. In 1989, she moved to Belgium to play and won the Belgian Women's Chess Championship in Ghent. She then placed first in the Women’s World Championship Zonal for Northwestern Europe in Oosterwijk in 1990, and participated in the Women's World Chess Championship Interzonal Tournament in Azov where she placed 16th.

Gina Lynne LoSasso played for the United States and Belgium in the Women's Chess Olympiads in Abu Dhabi and Novi Sad respectively. In 1990, she was awarded the FIDE Woman International Master (WIM) title for her performance playing first board at the 29th Chess Olympiad (women) in Novi Sad (+7, =3, -3).

In the 1990s, she returned to the US and completed a bachelors, masters, and doctoral degree at Wayne State University in less than five years. Her PhD, earned in 1999, was in the field of clinical neuropsychology.

== Personal life ==
Gina Lynne LoSasso was born in Brooklyn, New York. She learned to play chess in her 20s and became one of the leading female chessplayers of the 1980s and early 1990s before returning to college in 1994. She married GM Ben Finegold in January 1989 in Hastings, England. They had a son, Spencer Finegold (born June 1991), and later divorced.
