= Smith–Morra Gambit =

Chess opening

Position: a8 black rook, b8 black knight, c8 black bishop, d8 black queen, e8 black king, f8 black bishop, g8 black knight, h8 black rook, a7 black pawn, b7 black pawn, d7 black pawn, e7 black pawn, f7 black pawn, g7 black pawn, h7 black pawn, d4 black pawn, e4 white pawn, c3 white pawn, a2 white pawn, b2 white pawn, f2 white pawn, g2 white pawn, h2 white pawn, a1 white rook, b1 white knight, c1 white bishop, d1 white queen, e1 white king, f1 white bishop, g1 white knight, h1 white rook
- Moves: 1.e4 c5 2.d4 cxd4 3.c3
- ECO: B20 or B21 (Note: The latest (2002) edition of the Encyclopaedia of Chess Openings, volume B, classifies all lines beginning 1.e4 c5 2.d4, including the Smith–Morra Gambit, under B20. Chess Informant, however, gives B21 as the code for 1.e4 c5 2.d4 cxd4 3.c3 in its guide to the ECO opening codes provided on its website and has classified games featuring the Smith–Morra Gambit under B21 in its more recent publications.)
- Named after: Ken Smith; Pierre Morra
- Parent: Sicilian Defence
- Synonym: Morra Gambit

In chess, the Smith–Morra Gambit (or simply Morra Gambit) is an opening gambit against the Sicilian Defence distinguished by the moves:

1. e4 c5
2. d4 cxd4
3. c3

White sacrifices a pawn to develop quickly and create attacking chances. In exchange for the gambit pawn, White has a piece developed after 4.Nxc3 and a pawn in the center, while Black has an extra pawn and a central pawn majority. The plan for White is straightforward and consists of placing the king's bishop on c4 to attack the f7-square, and controlling both the c- and d-files with rooks, taking advantage of rapid development, open lines, and Black's difficulty in finding a good square for the queen.

The Smith–Morra is popular at the club level and played occasionally by masters.

== History ==
The Smith–Morra is named after Pierre Morra (1900–1969) from France, and Ken Smith (1930–1999) of the Dallas Chess Club. In Europe the name Morra Gambit is preferred; other names for it, including Tartakower Gambit and Matulovic Gambit, have disappeared.

Around 1950, Morra published a booklet and several articles about the Smith–Morra. Smith wrote a total of nine books and forty-nine articles about the gambit. At the San Antonio 1972 chess tournament, Smith played it against Donald Byrne, Larry Evans, and Henrique Mecking, but lost all three games.

International Master Marc Esserman, author of the 2012 book Mayhem in the Morra!, is one of the leading advocates of the opening. In the Chessable Masters tournament in April 2023, Hikaru Nakamura played it in two rapid games against Fabiano Caruana, winning one and losing the other.

== Themes for White ==
In return for the sacrificed pawn, White acquires a number of benefits that can be used to create active plans:

- Active development and quick castling. White's development scheme usually (but not always, as the Siberian trap demonstrates) consists of Nf3, Bc4, 0-0, Qe2, Rfd1, and Rac1 in some order.
  - Additionally, the Bc1 will often develop to g5 when Black plays ...Nge7 to make it difficult for Black to continue developing without weakening the kingside slightly by ...h6 or ...f6.
- Prevention or delay of Black's castling. This can open the door for powerful sacrificial ideas which, when correctly timed, can devastate the Black king:
  - When Black's king is uncastled, the sacrifice Nd5! is especially powerful with a Black pawn on e6, as the recapture ...exd5 would allow White to open the e-file for the White rook or queen. In two notable games, Esserman defeated GM Loek van Wely and GM Dommaraju Gukesh using this sacrifice.
  - Another idea is Nxb5! with Black pawns on a6 and b5. Although not as common as Nd5!, it is possible in some lines like the Chicago Defence when Black is slow to castle. Occasionally, it is even possible when Black is castled if White's tactics on the queenside justify it.
  - The sacrifice Bxe6! is typical for Sicilian positions and can sometimes occur here as well.
- Pressure down the c- and d-files, usually achieved with rooks on c1 and d1.
- A long-lasting initiative that can be used to create a kingside attack.

To survive against a well-prepared White player, Black must first navigate the minefield of traps in the opening, then contend with White's long-term pressure and initiative. If Black manages to do this while holding on to the extra pawn, Black will have good chances to win the ensuing endgame. This is not easy, however, and many Sicilian players opt to decline the gambit altogether.

== Morra Gambit Accepted: 3...dxc3 ==
=== 4.Nxc3 ===
==== Scheveningen Formation ====
- Classical Main line: 4...Nc6 5.Nf3 d6 6.Bc4 e6 7.0-0 Nf6 8.Qe2 Be7 9.Rd1 e5 10.h3 or 10.Be3
- Scheveningen setup: 4...Nc6 5.Nf3 d6 6.Bc4 e6 7.0-0 Nf6 (or Be7) 8.Qe2 a6 9.Rd1 Qc7 (probably inferior Qa5) 10.Bf4 (10.Bg5) Be7
- Siberian Variation: 4...Nc6 5.Nf3 e6 6.Bc4 Nf6 and 7...Qc7, with the idea being after 7.0-0 Qc7 8.Qe2 Ng4!, 9.h3?? loses to the famous "Siberian Trap" 9...Nd4!, winning the queen. If instead White plays 9.Rd1, preventing 9...Nd4, Black can continue with 9...Bc5 with a clearly better game.

==== Paulsen Formation ====
- 4...Nc6 (or 4...e6) 5.Nf3 e6 6.Bc4 a6 (Nge7) 7.0-0 Nge7 (d6 8.Qe2 Nge7 9.Bg5 h6) 8.Bg5 f6 9.Be3

==== Kan Formation ====
- 4...e6 5. Nf3 a6

==== Larsen Defense ====
- 4...Nc6 5. Nf3 e6 6. Bc4 Qc7 7. Qe2 a6 8. O-O Bd6

==== Morphy Defense ====
- 4...Nc6 5. Nf3 e6 6. Bc4 Bc5

==== Morphy Defense Deferred ====
- 4...Nc6 5.Nf3 e6 6.Bc4 a6 7.O-O b5 8.Bb3 Bc5

==== Pin Defense ====
- 4...Nc6 5.Nf3 e6 6.Bc4 Bb4

==== Sozin Formation ====
- 4...Nc6 5.Bc4 e6 6.Nf3 d6 7.O-O a6 8.Qe2 b5

==== Taimanov Formation ====
- 4...e6 5.Bc4 a6 6.Nf3 Ne7

==== Classical Formation ====
- 4...Nc6 5.Nf3 d6 6.Bc4 a6 eventually 7...Bg4

==== Fianchetto Formation ====
- Fianchetto: 4...g6 (4...Nc6 5.Nf3 g6 allows 6.h4!?) 5.Nf3 Bg7 6.Bc4 Nc6

==== Chicago Defense ====
- 4...d6 5. Nf3 e6 6. Bc4 Nf6 7. O-O a6
- 4...e6 5.Bc4 a6 6.Nf3 b5 7.Bb3 d6 8.0-0 and Black plays ...Ra7 at some stage
- Early queenside fianchetto: 4...e6 5.Bc4 a6 6.Nf3 b5 7.Bb3 Bb7
- 4...Nc6 5. Bc4 e6 6. Nf3 d6 7. O-O a6 8. Qe2 b5 9. Bb3 Ra7

==== Finegold Defense ====
- 4...d6 5. Nf3 e6 6. Bc4 Nf6 7. 0-0 Be7 8. Qe2 a6

=== 4.Bc4 or 4.Nf3 ===
This line is similar to the Danish Gambit: 4...cxb2 5.Bxb2

== Morra Gambit Declined ==
- Advance (or Push) Variation: 3...d3
  - Dubois Variation 4.c4
- Alapin Variation: 3...Nf6 4.e5 Nd5
- Scandinavian Formation: 3...d5 4.exd5 Qxd5 (Nf6) 5.cxd4
- Center Formation: 3...e5
- Wing Formation: 3...Qa5

== See also ==
- Another anti-Sicilian gambit is the Wing Gambit (1.e4 c5 2.b4).
- List of chess openings
- List of chess openings named after people
