= Michael A. Mulyar =

American chess player (born 1978)

Personal information
- Born: October 30, 1978 (age 47) Westminster, Colorado

Chess career
- Country: United States
- Title: International Master (2001)
- Peak rating: 2446 (October 2002)

Michael A. Mulyar (born 1978), is an American chess International Master from Westminster, Colorado, and attended Yale University. Mulyar is a three-time Colorado State Champion (1992, 1993, 1995), and he has represented the U.S. in international competition. He won the U.S. Open Chess Championship in 1999 and 2007.
