= Chess Club and Scholastic Center of Atlanta =

Chess venue in Roswell, Georgia

Coordinates: 34.021668°N 84.285880°W

- Type: Regional Chess Club
- Founded: September 9, 2017
- Founder: Alexander Francis Wlson-Webb
- Location: Atlanta, Georgia
- Country: United States

The Chess Club and Scholastic Center of Atlanta (CCSCATL) is a chess venue located in Roswell, Georgia. It is administered by co-founder Tom Poyer Saunders, a chess grandmaster from Malvern, England.

== History ==
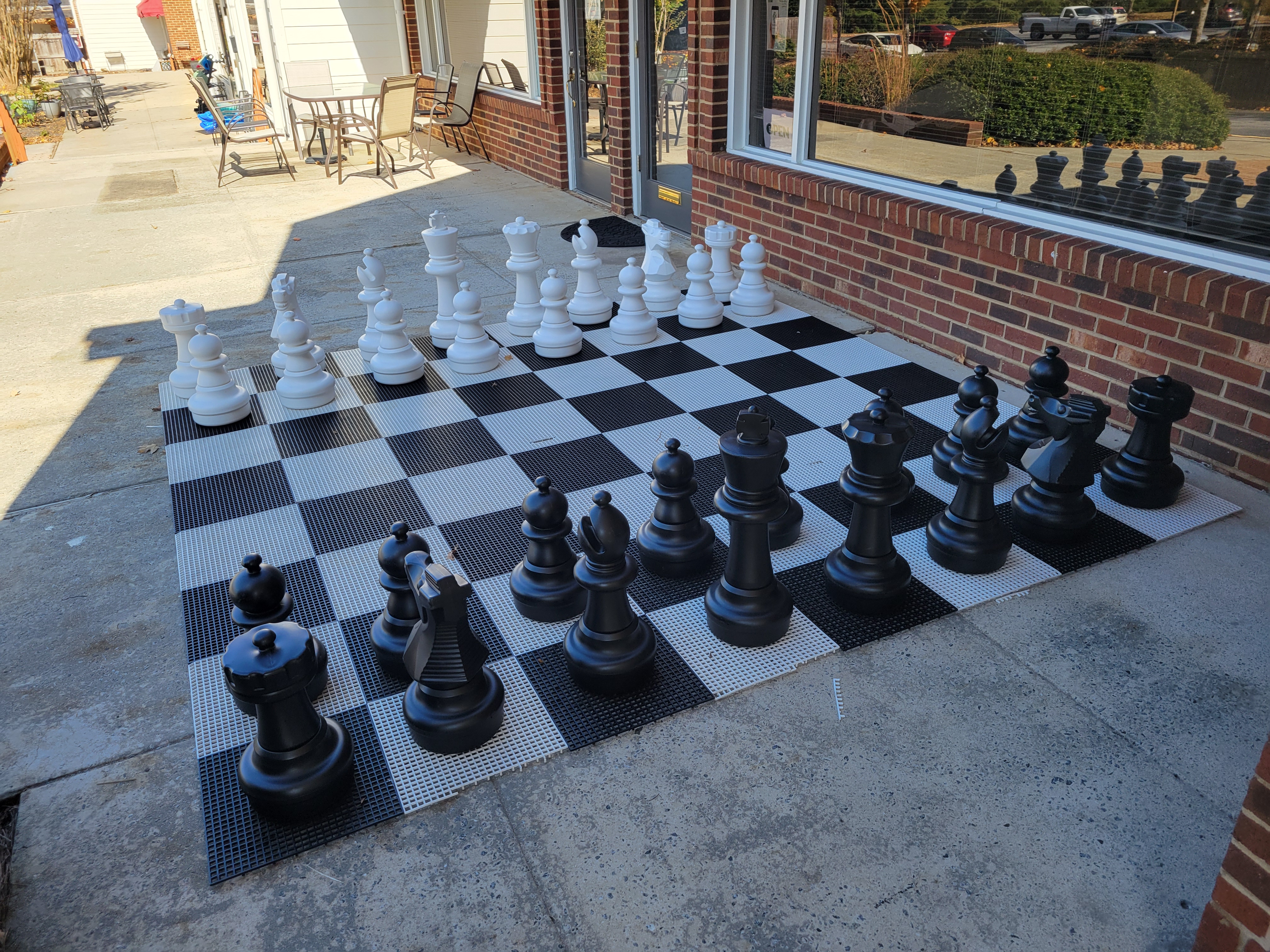
Giant chess set outside Chess Zone in Roswell

The CCSCATL was founded by Alexander Francis Wlson-Webb. It officially opened on September 9, 2017. In December 2021, Kidchess acquired the Chess Center.
