= U.S. Open Chess Championship =

Annual chess tournament in the US

The U.S. Open Championship is an open national chess championship that has been held in the United States annually since 1900. The top American player usually qualifies for the U.S. Chess Championship.

== History ==
The tournament was originally the championship of the Western Chess Association, and was called the Western Open. In 1934, the Western Chess Association became the American Chess Federation and the tournament became the American Chess Federation congress. In 1939, that organization merged into the United States Chess Federation (USCF) and the tournament became the U.S. Open.

In early years the tournament was usually small, and most years play was conducted as round robin. In some years it had to be divided into preliminary and final sections. It grew larger starting in 1934, necessitating use of different formats. In 1946, the Swiss System was used for preliminary rounds, and in 1947 and subsequent years the tournament was held as a single section paired by the Swiss System.

For many years, the tournament had 12 or 13 rounds and lasted two weeks. After experimentation with various less-demanding formats, in recent years it has usually been nine rounds; the 2015 tournament was nine rounds in nine days.

Tournament participation grew through the 1950s and 1960s. Milwaukee 1953 had 181 entrants, setting a new record for the tournament. Cleveland 1957 had 184 players, and San Francisco 1961 set another attendance record with 198 players. The 1963 Open at Chicago had 266 entries, making it the largest chess tournament held in the United States to that time. The tourney was slightly smaller at Boston in 1964, with a field of 229.

The 1983 Open at Pasadena was the largest ever, at 836 official entries; it also featured the participation of Viktor Korchnoi, who had played in the last two World Championship matches.

In the 2000s, the fields were over 400 to 500 entries. The tournament began in some editions to decline both in attendance and importance, and often many winners are involved in a tie for first, especially since the mid 1990s.

The cash prizes awarded were large for their time and added to the tournament's popularity. In 1962, the entry fee was $20, with a first prize of $1,000, second prize $500, third $300, fourth $200, fifth $100, sixth through tenth $50 and eleventh through fifteenth $25. The Women's Open Champion won $200, and the women's runner-up $100. Additional cash prizes were awarded to the top women, the top junior, and for the best scores in the Expert, A, B, and C classes. The 2024 guaranteed prize fund was $60,000, with $10,000 for first place.

== Winners ==
No.	Year	Location	Champions
1	1900	Excelsior, Minnesota	Louis Uedemann
2	1901	Excelsior, Minnesota	Nicholas MacLeod
3	1902	Excelsior, Minnesota	Louis Uedemann
4	1903	Chicago	Max Judd
5	1904	St. Louis, Missouri	Stasch Mlotkowski
6	1905	Excelsior, Minnesota	Edward F. Schrader
7	1906	Chicago	George H. Wolbrecht
8	1907	Excelsior, Minnesota	Einar Michelsen
9	1908	Excelsior, Minnesota	Edward P. Elliot
10	1909	Excelsior, Minnesota	Oscar Chajes
11	1910	Chicago	George. H. Wolbrecht
12	1911	Excelsior, Minnesota	Charles Blake
13	1912	Excelsior, Minnesota	Edward P. Elliot
14	1913	Chicago	Bradford B. Jefferson
15	1914	Memphis, Tennessee	Bradford B. Jefferson
16	1915	Excelsior, Minnesota	Jackson Showalter
17	1916	Chicago	Edward Lasker
18	1917	Lexington, Kentucky	Edward Lasker
19	1918	Chicago	Bora Kostić
20	1919	Cincinnati	Edward Lasker
21	1920	Memphis, Tennessee	Edward Lasker
22	1921	Cleveland, Ohio	Edward Lasker
23	1922	Louisville, Kentucky	Samuel Factor
24	1923	San Francisco	Stasch Mlotkowski, Norman Whitaker
25	1924	Detroit	Carlos Torre
26	1925	Cedar Point, Ohio	Abraham Kupchik
27	1926	Chicago	Leon Stolzenberg
28	1927	Kalamazoo, Michigan	Albert Charles Margolis
29	1928	South Bend, Indiana	Leon Stolzenberg
30	1929	St. Louis, Missouri	Herman H. Hahlbohm
31	1930	Chicago	Samuel Factor, Norman Whitaker
32	1931	Tulsa, Oklahoma	Samuel Reshevsky
33	1932	Minneapolis	Reuben Fine
34	1933	Detroit	Reuben Fine
35	1934	Chicago	Reuben Fine, Samuel Reshevsky
36	1935	Milwaukee	Reuben Fine
37	1936	Philadelphia	Israel A. Horowitz
38	1937	Chicago	David Polland
39	1938	Boston	Israel A. Horowitz, Isaac Kashdan
40	1939	New York City	Reuben Fine
41	1940	Dallas	Reuben Fine
42	1941	St. Louis, Missouri	Reuben Fine
43	1942	Dallas	Herman Steiner, Daniel Yanofsky
44	1943	Syracuse, New York	Israel A. Horowitz
45	1944	Boston	Samuel Reshevsky
46	1945	Peoria, Illinois	Anthony Santasiere
47	1946	Pittsburgh	Herman Steiner
48	1947	Corpus Christi, Texas	Isaac Kashdan
49	1948	Baltimore	Weaver W. Adams
50	1949	Omaha, Nebraska	Albert Sandrin Jr.
51	1950	Detroit	Arthur Bisguier
52	1951	Fort Worth, Texas	Larry Evans
53	1952	Tampa, Florida	Larry Evans
54	1953	Milwaukee	Donald Byrne
55	1954	New Orleans	Larry Evans, Arturo Pomar
56	1955	Long Beach, California	Nicolas Rossolimo, Samuel Reshevsky (Rossolimo awarded title on tie-break)
57	1956	Oklahoma City	Arthur Bisguier
58	1957	Cleveland, Ohio	Bobby Fischer, Arthur Bisguier (Fischer awarded title on tie-break)
59	1958	Rochester, Minnesota	Eldis Cobo Arteaga
60	1959	Omaha, Nebraska	Arthur Bisguier
61	1960	St. Louis, Missouri	Robert Byrne
62	1961	San Francisco	Pal Benko
63	1962	San Antonio, Texas	Antonio Medina Garcia
64	1963	Chicago	William Lombardy, Robert Byrne
65	1964	Boston	Pal Benko
66	1965	Río Piedras, Puerto Rico	Pal Benko, William Lombardy
67	1966	Seattle	Pal Benko, Robert Byrne
68	1967	Atlanta	Pal Benko
69	1968	Aspen, Colorado	Bent Larsen
70	1969	Lincoln, Nebraska	Pal Benko, Arthur Bisguier, Milan Vukcevich
71	1970	Boston	Bent Larsen
72	1971	Ventura, California	Walter Browne, Larry Evans
73	1972	Atlantic City, New Jersey	Walter Browne
74	1973	Chicago	Norman Weinstein, Duncan Suttles, Walter Browne, Greg DeFotis, Ruben Rodríguez (Weinstein awarded title on tie-break)
75	1974	New York City	Pal Benko, Vlastimil Hort
76	1975	Lincoln, Nebraska	Pal Benko, William Lombardy
77	1976	Fairfax, Virginia	Anatoly Lein, Leonid Shamkovich
78	1977	Columbus, Ohio	Leonid Shamkovich, Andy Soltis, Timothy Taylor
79	1978	Phoenix, Arizona	Joseph Bradford
80	1979	Chicago	Florin Gheorghiu
81	1980	Atlanta	John Fedorowicz, Florin Gheorghiu
82	1981	Palo Alto, California	Florin Gheorghiu, Larry Christiansen, Jeremy Silman, Nick de Firmian, John Meyer
83	1982	St. Paul, Minnesota	Andrew Soltis, William Martz
84	1983	Pasadena, California	Larry Christiansen, Viktor Korchnoi
85	1984	Ft. Worth, Texas	Roman Dzindzichashvili, Sergey Kudrin
86	1985	Hollywood, Florida	Yasser Seirawan, Boris Spassky, Joel Benjamin
87	1986	Somerset, New Jersey	Larry Christiansen
88	1987	Portland, Oregon	Lev Alburt
89	1988	Boston	Dmitry Gurevich
90	1989	Chicago	Lev Alburt
91	1990	Jacksonville, Florida	Yasser Seirawan
92	1991	Los Angeles	Michael Rohde, Vladimir Akopian
93	1992	Dearborn, Michigan	Gregory Kaidanov
94	1993	Philadelphia	Alexander Shabalov
95	1994	Chicago	Georgi Orlov, Dmitry Gurevich, Ben Finegold, Smbat Lputian, Leo Kaushansky, Albert Chow
96	1995	Concord, California	Alex Yermolinsky
97	1996	Alexandria, Virginia	Gabriel Schwartzman
98	1997	Kissimmee, Florida	Alex Yermolinsky
99	1998	Kailua-Kona, Hawaii	Judit Polgár, Boris Gulko
100	1999	Reno, Nevada	Alex Yermolinsky, Alexander Goldin, Eduardas Rozentalis, Alexander Shabalov, Gabriel Schwartzman, Michael Mulyar
101	2000	St. Paul, Minnesota	Alex Yermolinsky
102	2001	Framingham, Massachusetts	Aleksander Wojtkiewicz, Joel Benjamin, Alexander Stripunsky, Fabian Doettling
103	2002	Cherry Hill, New Jersey	Gennadi Zaichik, Evgeniy Najer
104	2003	Los Angeles	Alexander Shabalov
105	2004	Ft. Lauderdale, Florida	Alexander Onischuk, Rodrigo Vásquez, Aleksander Wojtkiewicz, Ildar Ibragimov, Andranik Matikozian, Renier González, Marcel Martinez
106	2005	Phoenix, Arizona	Vadim Milov, Joel Benjamin
107	2006	Oak Brook, Illinois	Yury Shulman
108	2007	Cherry Hill, New Jersey	Boris Gulko, Sergey Kudrin, Benjamin Finegold, Alexander Shabalov, Michael A. Rohde, Michael A. Mulyar, Anton Paolo Del Mundo
109	2008	Dallas	Alexander Shabalov, Rade Milovanović, Enrico Sevillano
110	2009	Indianapolis	Dmitry Gurevich, Sergey Kudrin, Alex Lenderman, Alex Yermolinsky, Jacek Stopa, Jesse Kraai
111	2010	Irvine, California	Alejandro Ramirez
112	2011	Orlando, Florida	Aleksandr Lenderman
113	2012	Vancouver, Washington	Manuel León Hoyos, Dmitry Gurevich, John Daniel Bryant
114	2013	Middleton, Wisconsin	Josh Friedel, Mackenzie Molner, Julio Sadorra
115	2014	Orlando, Florida	Conrad Holt
116	2015	Phoenix, Arizona	Alexander Shabalov
117	2016	Indianapolis, Indiana	Alexander Shabalov
118	2017	Norfolk, Virginia	Aleksandr Lenderman
119	2018	Middleton, Wisconsin	Timur Gareyev
120	2019	Orlando, Florida	Illia Nyzhnyk
121	2021	Cherry Hill, New Jersey	Aleksandr Lenderman
122	2022	Rancho Mirage, California	Aleksey Sorokin, Elshan Moradiabadi
123	2023	Grand Rapids, Michigan	Andrew Tang, Aleksey Sorokin
124	2024	Norfolk, Virginia	Semen Khanin, Jianchao Zhou
125	2025	Middleton, Wisconsin	Dariusz Świercz
126	2026	Grand Rapids, Michigan	Grigoriy Oparin, Jianchao Zhou, Christopher Yoo, Jason Liang, Rahul Srivatshav Peddi, Sebastian Kostolansky, Bohdan Bilovil, Julian Colville

== See also ==
- U.S. Women's Open Chess Championship
- U.S. Women's Chess Championship
- U.S. Chess Championship
- American Chess Congress
