= Michael Brown (chess player) =

American chess grandmaster (born 1997)

Personal information
- Born: August 24, 1997 (age 28) Irvine, California, U.S.

Chess career
- Country: United States
- Title: Grandmaster (2019)
- FIDE rating: 2509 (July 2026)
- Peak rating: 2529 (February 2019)

Michael William Brown (born August 24, 1997) is an American chess grandmaster.

== Chess career ==
Brown was introduced to chess in the second grade. In July 2015, he won the Southern California Chess Championship.

In May 2017, Brown achieved his first norm at the 26th Annual Chicago Open. He achieved his second norm later that year by defeating grandmaster Zoltán Almási at the Chess.com-hosted Isle of Man International. He achieved his third, and final norm in January 2019.

== Personal life ==
Brown studied applied mathematics at Brigham Young University from 2015 to 2018. He then studied law at the University of Pennsylvania Law School from 2021 to 2024.
