= Darwin Yang =

American chess grandmaster (born 1996)

Personal information
- Born: December 4, 1996 (age 29) Dallas, Texas

Chess career
- Country: United States
- Title: Grandmaster (2016)
- FIDE rating: 2482 (July 2026)
- Peak rating: 2498 (July 2012)

Darwin Yang is an American chess grandmaster.

== Chess career ==
In 2008, Yang finished third in a tie-breaker for the under-12 group in the World Youth Chess Championship. This, along with Sam Shankland's identical result for the under-18 group, were top performances for American players.

In April 2011, Yang earned the International Master title at the SPICE Spring Chess Invitational by defeating IM Marc Esserman. Yang had achieved all three IM norms in West Texas.

In 2014, Yang won the Texas State Championship, hosted by the Texas Chess Association.

== Personal life ==
From 2015 to 2019, Yang attended Harvard University for a bachelor's degree in economics and mathematical sciences. In 2021, he began pursuing a Ph.D. in economics at Princeton University.
