= Ken Smith (chess player) =

American chess player and author (1930–1999)

Kenneth Ray Smith (September 13, 1930 – February 4, 1999) was a chess player and author. He was a member of the Dallas Chess Club and reached the rank of FIDE Master.

Smith founded Chess Digest in 1962. The Smith–Morra Gambit is named after him.

Smith was also a notable poker player, and finished in fourth place out of 75 entries in the 1981 World Series of Poker Main Event.

== Books ==
- King's Indian Attack, co-author John Hall, 2nd Revised Edition, Chess Digest, ISBN 978-0875681740
- Modern Art of Attack, co-author John Hall, 1988, Chess Digest, ISBN 978-0875681764
- An Unbeatable White Repertoire After 1 e4 e5 2 Nf3, co-author Larry Evans, 1988, Chess Digest, ISBN 978-0875681719
- Winning with the Colle System, co-author John Hall, 1990, 2nd Revised Edition, Chess Digest, ISBN 978-0875681696
- Winning with the Center Counter 1 e4 d5!, co-author John Hall, 1991, Chess Digest, ISBN 978-0875681962
- 2 c3 vs. The Sicilian and The Smith–Morra Gambit Declined, 1992, Chess Digest, ISBN 978-0875681887
- Smith–Morra Accepted • A Game Collection, co-author Bill Wall, 1992, Chess Enterprises, ISBN 978-0945470229
- Essential Chess Endings Explained Move By Move • Volume Two, 1992, Chess Digest, ISBN 978-0875682105
- The Vienna Game and Gambit, co-author A. E. Santasiere, 1992, Revised 2nd Edition, ISBN 978-0875682044
- Test Your Opening, Middlegame and Endgame Play, co-author Roy DeVault, 1992, Chess Digest, ASIN B000W028W6
- Winning with the Pirc Defense, 1993, Chess Digest, ISBN 978-0875682266
- Winning with the Reti Opening, co-author John Hall, 1993, Chess Digest, ISBN 978-0875682372
- Winning with the Blackmar–Diemer Gambit, co-author John Hall, 1993, Chess Digest, ISBN 978-0875682341
- The Veresov Attack, co-author John Hall, 1994, Chess Digest, ISBN 978-0875682518
- The Göring Gambit • Accepted & Declined, co-author John Hall, 1994, Chess Digest, ISBN 978-0875682532
- Winning With The Benko Gambit • Accepted, Semi-Accepted, Declined, co-author John Hall, 1994, Chess Digest, ISBN 978-0875682419
- The Englund Gambit and The Blackburne–Hartlaub Gambit Complex, co-author John Hall, 1994, Chess Digest, ISBN 978-0875682426
- Test Your Opening, Middlegame and Endgame Play • Volume II, co-author Roy DeVault, 1994, Chess Digest, ASIN B0087T145G
- Queen's Gambit Accepted, co-author John Hall, 1995, Chess Digest, ISBN 978-0875682556
- The Catalan, co-author John Hall, 1995, Chess Digest, ISBN 978-0875682648
- The Henning–Schara Gambit, co-author John Hall, 1995, Chess Digest, ISBN 978-0875682686
- Grand Prix Attack • Attacking the Sicilian Defense with 2 f4, co-author John Hall, 1995, Revised 2nd Edition, Chess Digest, ISBN 978-0875682761
