= Ilya Gurevich =

American chess grandmaster (born 1972)

Personal information
- Born: Ilya Mark Gurevich; February 8, 1972 (age 54) Kyiv, Ukrainian SSR, Soviet Union

Chess career
- Country: United States
- Title: Grandmaster (1993)
- FIDE rating: 2586 (July 2026)
- Peak rating: 2586 (July 1999)

Ilya Mark Gurevich (born February 8, 1972) is a Soviet-born American chess player.

== Biography ==
Born in Kyiv, he emigrated to the U.S. in January 1980. He was a student at Yeshiva Academy in Worcester, Massachusetts.

In 1983, Gurevich won the U.S. National Scholastic Elementary School Chess Championship. He became a chess master at 12 years, 3 months. In 1985, at thirteen, he won the World Under 14 Championship in Lomas de Zamora, Argentina; as a result of this victory, he was awarded the title of FIDE Master.

Gurevich won the 1990 World Junior Championship as an 18-year-old. He tied for first place with Alexei Shirov and was awarded the win because of his superior tiebreak points; with this victory, Gurevich was awarded the title of International Master. In 1991 he played on the U.S. team which took the silver medal at the World Under 26 Team Chess Championship in Maringá, Brazil. In 1993, FIDE awarded him the title of Grandmaster.

He later cut down on his chess activities to become an options trader.

== See also ==
- List of Jewish chess players
