= Jesse Kraai =

American chess grandmaster (born 1972)

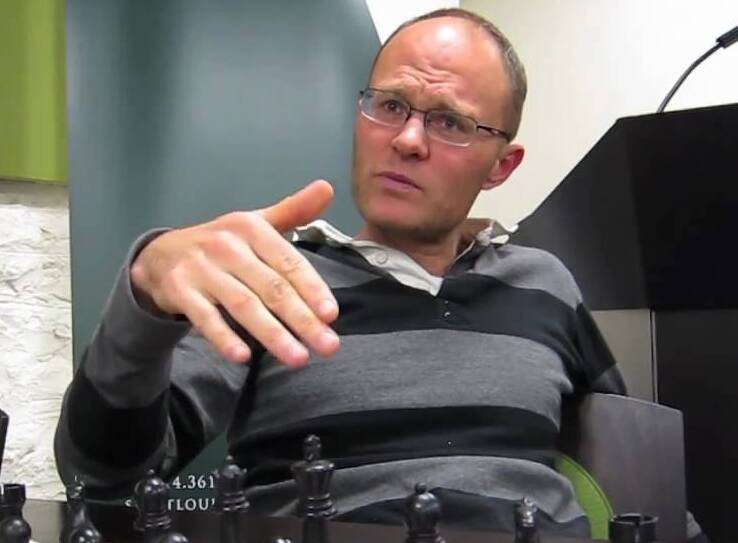
- Jesse Kraai, Saint Louis 2011

Personal information
- Born: May 6, 1972 (age 54) Santa Fe, New Mexico, U.S.

Chess career
- Country: United States
- Title: Grandmaster (2007)
- Peak rating: 2527 (September 2009)

Jesse Kraai (born May 6, 1972) is an American chess Grandmaster (GM). He reached GM status in 2007 making him the first American-born player to achieve the title since Tal Shaked in 1997.

He won the 1987 National Junior High School Championship, tied for first in the 1988 National High School Championship, and won the Denker Tournament of High School Champions in 1989 and 1990. In 2007, he won the New Mexico chess state championship for the fifth consecutive year.

Kraai was born in Santa Fe. He received his B.A. from Shimer College in 1994, his M.A. in philosophy from the University of Jena, Germany in 1996, and his Ph.D. in philosophy from the University of Heidelberg in 2001. His dissertation examined the influence of Georg Joachim Rheticus on the development of Copernican theory.

In 2013, he published Lisa: A Chess Novel (ISBN 0976848902). He withdrew from teaching chess for three years to write it.
