= Abby Marshall =

American chess player (born 1991)

Personal information
- Born: June 11, 1991 (age 35) Columbus, Ohio

Chess career
- Country: United States
- Title: Woman FIDE Master (2007)
- FIDE rating: 2116 (February 2014)
- Peak rating: 2208 (October 2007)

Abby Marshall (born June 11, 1991) is a chess player from Columbus, Ohio, United States, who has resided in Virginia, United States since late 2005. She is a Woman FIDE Master and in 2009 won the Denker Tournament of High School Champions, making her, at age 18, the first female player ever to have attained the title. Marshall was also the National 11th Grade Chess Co-champion in 2008, and is the only two-time winner of the Susan Polgar National Invitational for Girls (2005 and 2006). She played in the 2009 World Youth Chess Championship.

Marshall writes a column for ChessCafe.com, "The Openings Explained." She has also written for the online edition of Chess Life.

She graduated from Barnard College in May 2014 with highest honors.
