= 1925 USSR Chess Championship =

Soviet chess tournament

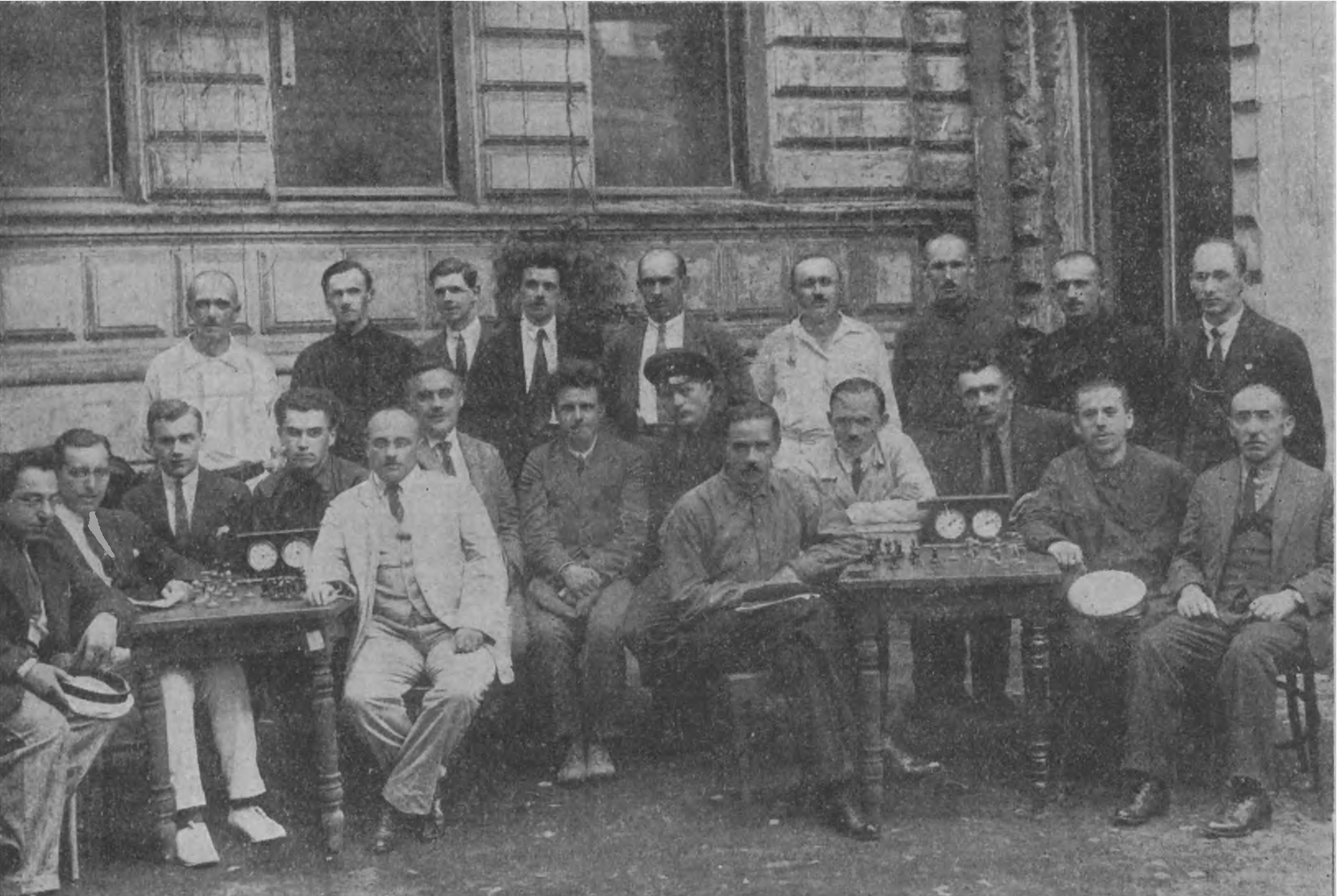
- The participants and organizers of the fourth USSR Chess Championship in 1925
- Location: Leningrad

Champion
- Efim Bogoljubow

The 1925 USSR Chess Championship was the fourth edition of USSR Chess Championship. Held from 11 August to 6 September in Leningrad. The tournament was won by Efim Bogoljubow.

== Table and results ==
1925 USSR Chess Championship
	Player	1	2	3	4	5	6	7	8	9	10	11	12	13	14	15	16	17	18	19	20	Total
1	(Soviet Union) Efim Bogoljubow	-	½	1	0	1	½	½	1	1	½	0	½	1	½	1	1	1	1	1	1	14
2	(Soviet Union) Grigory Levenfish	½	-	0	0	1	½	0	½	0	1	1	1	½	1	1	1	1	1	1	1	13
3	(Soviet Union) Ilya Rabinovich	0	1	-	0	0	0	½	1	1	½	½	0	1	1	1	1	1	1	1	1	12½
4	(Soviet Union) Boris Verlinsky	1	1	1	-	½	½	1	1	½	1	0	½	½	1	0	0	1	0	½	1	12
5	(Soviet Union) Fedor Duz-Khotimirsky	0	0	1	½	-	½	½	1	1	1	½	0	½	½	½	0	1	1	1	1	11½
6	(Soviet Union) Solomon Gotthilf	½	½	1	½	½	-	0	½	0	½	½	1	1	½	½	½	1	0	1	1	11
7	(Soviet Union) Alexander Ilyin-Genevsky	½	1	½	0	½	1	-	0	0	½	½	1	0	½	½	1	1	1	1	½	11
8	(Soviet Union) Peter Romanovsky	0	½	0	0	0	½	1	-	1	1	1	1	0	½	1	1	1	½	0	1	11
9	(Soviet Union) Abram Rabinovich	0	1	0	½	0	1	1	0	-	1	0	0	0	½	1	1	½	1	½	1	10
10	(Soviet Union) Aleksandr Sergeyev	½	0	½	0	0	½	½	0	0	-	1	½	½	½	1	½	1	1	1	1	10
11	(Soviet Union) Yakov Vilner	1	0	½	1	½	½	½	0	1	0	-	0	½	½	1	1	0	1	0	½	9½
12	(Soviet Union) Arvid Kubbel	½	0	1	½	1	0	0	0	1	½	1	-	1	½	0	½	½	½	½	½	9½
13	(Soviet Union) Nikolai Zubarev	0	½	0	½	½	0	1	1	1	½	½	0	-	½	0	½	½	1	½	1	9½
14	(Soviet Union) Alexey Selezniev	½	0	0	0	½	½	½	½	½	½	½	½	½	-	½	1	½	1	½	½	9
15	(Soviet Union) Nikolai Grigoriev	0	0	0	1	½	½	½	0	0	0	0	1	1	½	-	0	1	0	1	1	8
16	(Soviet Union) Anton Kaspersky	0	0	0	1	1	½	0	0	0	½	0	½	½	0	1	-	0	½	1	½	7
17	(Soviet Union) Veniamin Sozin	0	0	0	0	0	0	0	0	½	0	1	½	½	½	0	1	-	1	½	1	6½
18	(Soviet Union) Vladimir Nenarokov	0	0	0	1	0	1	0	½	0	0	0	½	0	0	1	½	0	-	1	½	6
19	(Soviet Union) Sergey von Freymann	0	0	0	½	0	0	0	1	½	0	1	½	½	½	0	0	½	0	-	0	5
20	(Soviet Union) Nikolai Kutuzov	0	0	0	0	0	0	½	0	0	0	½	½	0	½	0	½	0	½	1	-	4
