= 1929 USSR Chess Championship =

Soviet chess tournament

- Location: Odessa

Champion
- Boris Verlinsky

The 1929 USSR Chess Championship was the 6th edition of USSR Chess Championship. Held from 2–20 September in Odessa. The tournament was won by Boris Verlinsky. The event was held outside Moscow and Leningrad for the first time. 36 players competed in four quarterfinal sections, with the top three in each advancing into two six-player semifinals. The top two from each semifinals were then to play a double round final to determine the champion (but due to the withdrawal of one of the finalists, the final tournament had only three players).

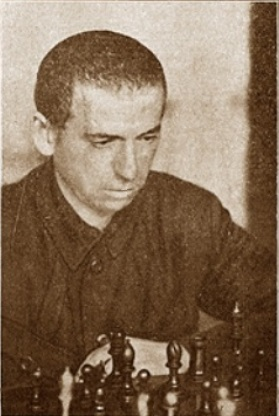
The champion Boris Verlinsky

== Tables and results ==
=== Quarterfinals ===
1929 USSR Chess Championship, Quarterfinal 1
	Player	1	2	3	4	5	6	7	8	9	Total
1	(Soviet Union) Yakov Rokhlin	-	1	½	½	½	½	0	1	1	5
2	(Soviet Union) Vladislav Silich	0	-	½	1	1	½	1	0	1	5
3	(Soviet Union) Konstantin Vigodchikov	½	½	-	½	½	½	1	1	0	4½
4	(Soviet Union) Alexander Ilyin-Genevsky	½	0	½	-	½	½	1	½	1	4½
5	(Soviet Union) Vasily Panov	½	0	½	½	-	0	½	1	1	4
6	(Soviet Union) Nikolai Sorokin	½	½	½	½	1	-	½	0	0	3½
7	(Soviet Union) Veniamin Sozin	1	0	0	0	½	½	-	½	1	3½
8	(Soviet Union) Yakov Vilner	0	1	0	½	0	1	½	-	0	3
9	(Soviet Union) A. Bernstein	0	0	1	0	0	1	0	1	-	3

1929 USSR Chess Championship, Quarterfinal 2
	Player	1	2	3	4	5	6	7	8	9	Total
1	(Soviet Union) Mikhail Botvinnik	-	1	½	1	1	½	1	1	1	7
2	(Soviet Union) Sergey von Freymann	0	-	½	1	1	1	1	1	1	6½
3	(Soviet Union) Vsevolod Rauzer	½	½	-	0	1	1	1	1	½	5½
4	(Soviet Union) Abram Poliak	0	0	1	-	1	1	1	1	½	5½
5	(Soviet Union) Nikolai Riumin	0	0	0	0	-	1	1	1	1	4
6	(Soviet Union) Vladimir Nenarokov	½	0	0	0	0	-	½	1	1	3
7	(Soviet Union) Viacheslav Ragozin	0	0	0	0	0	½	-	½	1	2
8	(Soviet Union) Sergey Mudrov	0	0	0	0	0	0	½	-	1	1½
9	(Soviet Union) Nikolay Pavlov-Pianov	0	0	½	½	0	0	0	0	*	1

1929 USSR Chess Championship, Quarterfinal 3
	Player	1	2	3	4	5	6	7	8	9	Total
1	(Soviet Union) Ilya Kan	-	1	½	½	1	1	½	1	1	6½
2	(Soviet Union) Boris Verlinsky	0	-	1	1	½	1	½	½	1	5½
3	(Soviet Union) Mikhail Makogonov	½	0	-	½	1	½	1	1	1	5½
4	(Soviet Union) Nikolai Zubarev	½	0	½	-	1	1	½	1	0	4½
5	(Soviet Union) Viktor Goglidze	0	½	0	0	-	½	½	1	1	3½
6	(Soviet Union) Nikolai Rudnev	0	0	½	0	½	-	1	0	1	3
7	(Soviet Union) Dmitry Grigorenko	½	½	0	½	½	0	-	½	0	2½
8	(Soviet Union) Abram Model	0	½	0	0	0	1	½	-	½	2½
9	(Soviet Union) Grigory Ravinsky	0	0	0	1	0	0	1	½	-	2½

1929 USSR Chess Championship, Quarterfinal 4
	Player	1	2	3	4	5	6	7	8	9	Total
1	(Soviet Union) Nikolai Grigoriev	-	½	1	0	1	½	½	1	1	5½
2	(Soviet Union) Vladimir Makogonov	½	-	0	1	0	1	1	1	1	5½
3	(Soviet Union) Peter Izmailov	0	1	-	1	½	0	1	½	1	5
4	(Soviet Union) Vladimir Kirillov	1	0	0	-	1	1	0	1	1	5
5	(Soviet Union) Solomon Rosenthal	0	1	½	0	-	½	1	1	½	4½
6	(Soviet Union) Solomon Gotthilf	½	0	1	0	½	-	½	0	½	3
7	(Soviet Union) Alexey Selezniev	½	0	0	1	0	½	-	½	½	3
8	(Soviet Union) Solomon Slonim	0	0	½	0	0	1	½	-	1	3
9	(Soviet Union) Vladimir Yuriev	0	0	0	0	½	½	½	0	-	1½

=== Semifinals ===
1929 USSR Chess Championship, Semifinal 1
	Player	1	2	3	4	5	6	Total
1	(Soviet Union) Peter Izmailov	-	½	½	1	1	½	3½
2	(Soviet Union) Ilya Kan	½	-	½	1	½	1	3½
3	(Soviet Union) Konstantin Vigodchikov	½	½	-	½	½	½	2½
4	(Soviet Union) Mikhail Botvinnik	0	0	½	-	1	1	2½
5	(Soviet Union) Vladimir Makogonov	0	½	½	0	-	½	1½
6	(Soviet Union) Vladislav Silich	½	0	½	0	½	-	1½

1929 USSR Chess Championship, Semifinal 2
	Player	1	2	3	4	5	6	Total
1	(Soviet Union) Sergey von Freymann	-	1	0	1	1	1	4
2	(Soviet Union) Boris Verlinsky	0	-	1	1	1	1	4
3	(Soviet Union) Vsevolod Rauzer	1	0	-	0	1	1	3
4	(Soviet Union) Mikhail Makogonov	0	0	1	-	0	½	1½
5	(Soviet Union) Nikolai Grigoriev	0	0	0	1	-	½	1½
6	(Soviet Union) Yakov Rokhlin	0	0	0	½	½	-	1

=== Final ===
1929 USSR Chess Championship, Final
	Player	1	2	3	Total
1	(Soviet Union) Boris Verlinsky	-	1 1	1 ½	3½
2	(Soviet Union) Sergey von Freymann	0 0	-	1 1	2
3	(Soviet Union) Ilya Kan	0 ½	0 0	-	½

Izmailov could not play at the end as he had to go off to take his final exams.
