= 1923 USSR Chess Championship =

Second USSR Chess Championship, held in July 1923 in Petrograd, Russia

- Location: Petrograd

Champion
- Peter Romanovsky

The 1923 USSR Chess Championship was the second edition of USSR Chess Championship. Held from 8 to 24 July in Petrograd. The tournament was won by Peter Romanovsky.

== Table and results ==
1923 USSR Chess Championship
		1	2	3	4	5	6	7	8	9	10	11	12	13	Total
1	(Soviet Union) Peter Romanovsky	-	0	1	1	½	1	½	1	1	1	1	1	1	10
2	(Soviet Union) Grigory Levenfish	1	-	½	1	0	1	1	1	1	½	½	½	1	9
3	(Soviet Union) Fedor Bogatyrchuk	0	½	-	½	1	0	1	0	½	1	1	1	1	7½
4	(Soviet Union) Fedor Duz-Khotimirsky	0	0	½	-	1	½	1	½	1	0	1	1	1	7½
5	(Soviet Union) Vladimir Nenarokov	½	1	0	0	-	0	½	1	1	1	1	½	1	7½
6	(Soviet Union) Arvid Kubbel	0	0	1	½	1	-	0	1	0	1	0	1	½	6
7	(Soviet Union) Alexander Ilyin-Genevsky	½	0	0	0	½	1	-	1	½	0	½	½	1	5½
8	(Soviet Union) Ilya Rabinovich	0	0	1	½	0	0	0	-	1	1	1	1	0	5½
9	(Soviet Union) Nikolai Grigoriev	0	0	½	0	0	1	½	0	-	1	1	½	½	5
10	(Soviet Union) Nikolai Zubarev	0	½	0	1	0	0	1	0	0	-	½	1	0	4
11	(Soviet Union) Yakov Vilner	0	½	0	0	0	1	½	0	0	½	-	0	1	3½
12	(Soviet Union) Konstantin Vygodchikov	0	½	0	0	½	0	½	0	½	0	1	-	½	3½
13	(Soviet Union) Sergey Lebedev	0	0	0	0	0	½	0	1	½	1	0	½	-	3½
