= 1924 USSR Chess Championship =

Soviet chess tournament

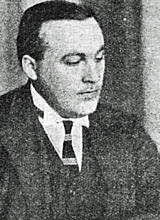
- USSR Chess Champion Efim Bogoljubow
- Location: Moscow

Champion
- Efim Bogoljubow

The 1924 USSR Chess Championship was the third edition of the USSR Chess Championship. It was held from 23 August to 15 September in Moscow. The tournament was won by Efim Bogoljubow.

== Table and results ==
1924 USSR Chess Championship
	Player	1	2	3	4	5	6	7	8	9	10	11	12	13	14	15	16	17	18	Total
1	(Soviet Union) Efim Bogoljubow	-	1	1	1	1	½	½	½	½	1	1	1	1	1	1	1	1	1	15
2	(Soviet Union) Peter Romanovsky	0	-	1	½	½	1	1	1	0	0	1	1	½	1	1	1	1	1	12½
3	(Soviet Union) Fedir Bohatyrchuk	0	0	-	½	1	1	½	1	1	½	0	½	1	1	½	1	1	1	11½
4	(Soviet Union) Grigory Levenfish	0	½	½	-	0	½	½	½	1	1	½	1	1	½	1	1	1	1	11½
5	(Soviet Union) Ilya Rabinovich	0	½	0	1	-	0	½	½	½	0	1	0	1	1	1	1	1	1	10
6	(Soviet Union) Vladimir Nenarokov	½	0	0	½	1	-	1	½	1	1	½	1	0	0	1	½	0	1	9½
7	(Soviet Union) Yakov Vilner	½	0	½	½	½	0	-	½	1	1	1	½	½	1	0	½	1	½	9½
8	(Soviet Union) Alexey Selezniev	½	0	0	½	½	½	½	-	½	1	0	½	1	½	1	½	1	1	9½
9	(Soviet Union) Veniamin Sozin	½	1	0	0	½	0	0	½	-	1	0	1	½	0	1	1	1	1	9
10	(Soviet Union) Boris Verlinsky	0	1	½	0	1	0	0	0	0	-	1	1	1	1	½	½	0	1	8½
11	(Soviet Union) Fedor Duz-Khotimirsky	0	0	1	½	0	½	0	1	1	0	-	0	½	1	1	1	1	0	8½
12	(Soviet Union) Abram Rabinovich	0	0	½	0	1	0	½	½	0	0	1	-	1	1	1	0	1	½	8
13	(Soviet Union) Alexander Ilyin-Genevsky	0	½	0	0	0	1	½	0	½	0	½	0	-	½	½	1	1	1	7
14	(Soviet Union) Nikolai Grigoriev	0	0	0	½	0	1	0	½	1	0	0	0	½	-	½	1	1	½	6½
15	(Soviet Union) Solomon Rosenthal	0	0	½	0	0	0	1	0	0	½	0	0	½	½	-	½	1	½	5
16	(Soviet Union) Aleksandr Sergeyev	0	0	0	0	0	½	½	½	0	½	0	1	0	0	½	-	0	½	4
17	(Soviet Union) Sergey von Freymann	0	0	0	0	0	1	0	0	0	1	0	0	0	0	0	1	-	1	4
18	(Soviet Union) Andrey Smorodsky	0	0	0	0	0	0	½	0	0	0	1	½	0	½	½	½	0	-	3½
