= 1927 USSR Chess Championship =

Chess Competition

- Location: Moscow

Champion
- Fedir Bohatyrchuk; Peter Romanovsky

The 1927 USSR Chess Championship was the fifth edition of USSR Chess Championship. Held from 26 September to 25 October in Moscow. Fedir Bohatyrchuk and Peter Romanovsky were declared champions, since a tie-break match could not be scheduled. An indication of the enhanced prestige of chess in the Soviet Union was the championship venue, the Hall of Columns of the House of Unions, one of the most eminent locations in the country. That edition also featured the debut of the future world chess champion, 16 year old talent Mikhail Botvinnik.

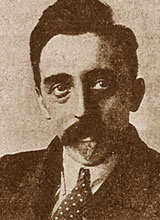
Fedir Bohatyrchuk

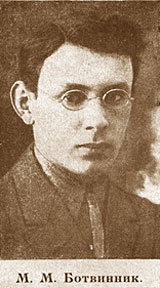
Mikhail Botvinnik in 1927

== Table and results ==
1927 USSR Chess Championship
	Player	1	2	3	4	5	6	7	8	9	10	11	12	13	14	15	16	17	18	19	20	21	Total
1	(Soviet Union) Fedir Bohatyrchuk	-	0	1	1	1	1	1	½	½	½	½	1	½	1	1	½	1	½	½	½	1	14½
2	(Soviet Union) Peter Romanovsky	1	-	0	½	½	½	1	0	1	0	1	½	1	1	1	1	1	½	1	1	1	14½
3	(Soviet Union) Fedor Duz-Khotimirsky	0	1	-	1	0	½	1	½	0	½	1	0	½	1	1	½	1	1	½	1	1	13
4	(Soviet Union) Abram Model	0	½	0	-	0	1	0	1	½	1	1	1	1	1	1	1	1	1	1	0	0	13
5	(Soviet Union) Vladimir Makogonov	0	½	1	1	-	0	½	1	1	½	0	½	½	0	½	½	1	1	1	1	1	12½
6	(Soviet Union) Mikhail Botvinnik	0	½	½	0	1	-	½	1	1	1	0	1	1	½	½	1	0	1	½	½	1	12½
7	(Soviet Union) Vladimir Nenarokov	0	0	0	1	½	½	-	1	1	½	½	½	1	1	0	1	0	½	½	½	1	11
8	(Soviet Union) Nikolai Grigoriev	½	1	½	0	0	0	0	-	½	½	0	½	1	1	1	½	1	1	½	0	1	10½
9	(Soviet Union) Alexander Ilyin-Genevsky	½	0	1	½	0	0	0	½	-	½	1	½	1	1	0	1	0	½	0	1	1	10
10	(Soviet Union) Ilya Rabinovich	½	1	½	0	½	0	½	½	½	-	1	½	½	0	1	½	0	0	1	½	½	9½
11	(Soviet Union) Sergey von Freymann	½	0	0	0	1	1	½	1	0	0	-	0	1	1	0	0	1	0	1	1	½	9½
12	(Soviet Union) Nikolay Pavlov-Pianov	0	½	1	0	½	0	½	½	½	½	1	-	0	0	1	1	1	0	½	½	½	9½
13	(Soviet Union) Aleksandr Sergeyev	½	0	½	0	½	0	0	0	0	½	0	1	-	1	½	1	½	1	1	½	½	9
14	(Soviet Union) Alexander Perfiliev	0	0	0	0	1	½	0	0	0	1	0	1	0	-	0	½	1	1	1	½	1	8½
15	(Soviet Union) Alexey Selezniev	0	0	0	0	½	½	1	0	1	0	1	0	½	1	-	½	½	½	½	½	0	8
16	(Soviet Union) Yakov Rokhlin	½	0	½	0	½	0	0	½	0	½	1	0	0	½	½	-	1	1	½	0	1	8
17	(Soviet Union) Yakov Vilner	0	0	0	0	0	1	1	0	1	1	0	0	½	0	½	0	-	1	0	1	1	8
18	(Soviet Union) Vsevolod Rauzer	½	½	0	0	0	0	½	0	½	1	1	1	0	0	½	0	0	-	1	1	0	7½
19	(Soviet Union) Anton Kaspersky	½	0	½	0	0	½	½	½	1	0	0	½	0	0	½	½	1	0	-	1	½	7½
20	(Soviet Union) Andrey Smorodsky	½	0	0	1	0	½	½	1	0	½	0	½	½	½	½	1	0	0	0	-	0	7
21	(Soviet Union) Khrisogon Kholodkevich	0	0	0	1	0	0	0	0	0	½	½	½	½	0	1	0	0	1	½	1	-	6½
