= 1948 USSR Chess Championship =

Soviet chess championship

16th Soviet Chess Championship (1948)
- Location: Moscow

Champion
- David Bronstein; Alexander Kotov

The 1948 Soviet Chess Championship was the 16th edition of USSR Chess Championship. Held from 10 November to 13 December 1948 in Moscow. The tournament was won by David Bronstein and Alexander Kotov. Mikhail Botvinnik did not participate in the championship again, as he had recently won the world title in the tournament at The Hague and Moscow. In fact he was to take a three-year break, to work on his doctorate. Quarterfinal tournaments were played in the cities of Tbilisi and Yaroslavl; and semifinals in Sverdlovsk, Leningrad and Moscow.

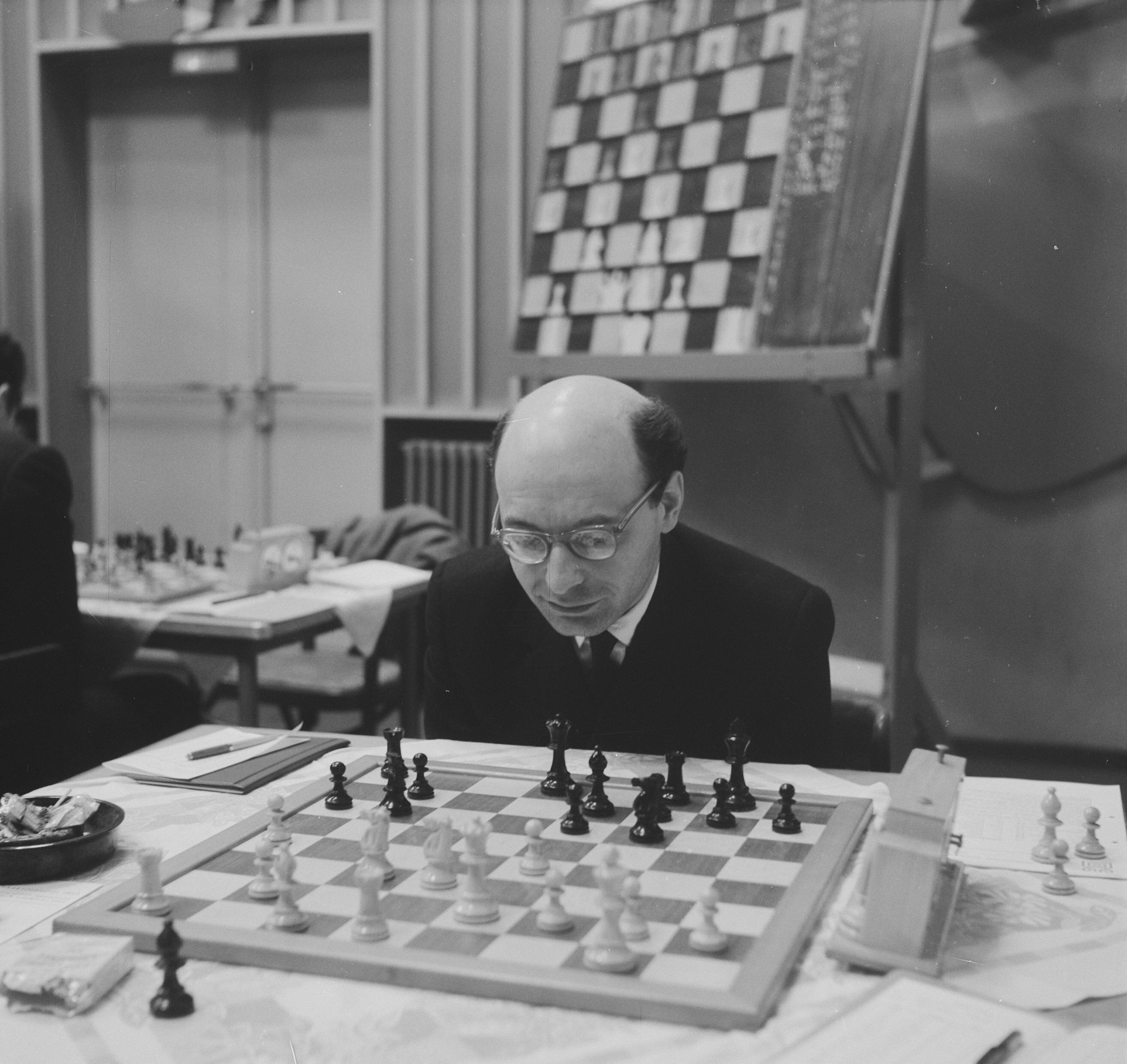
David Bronstein

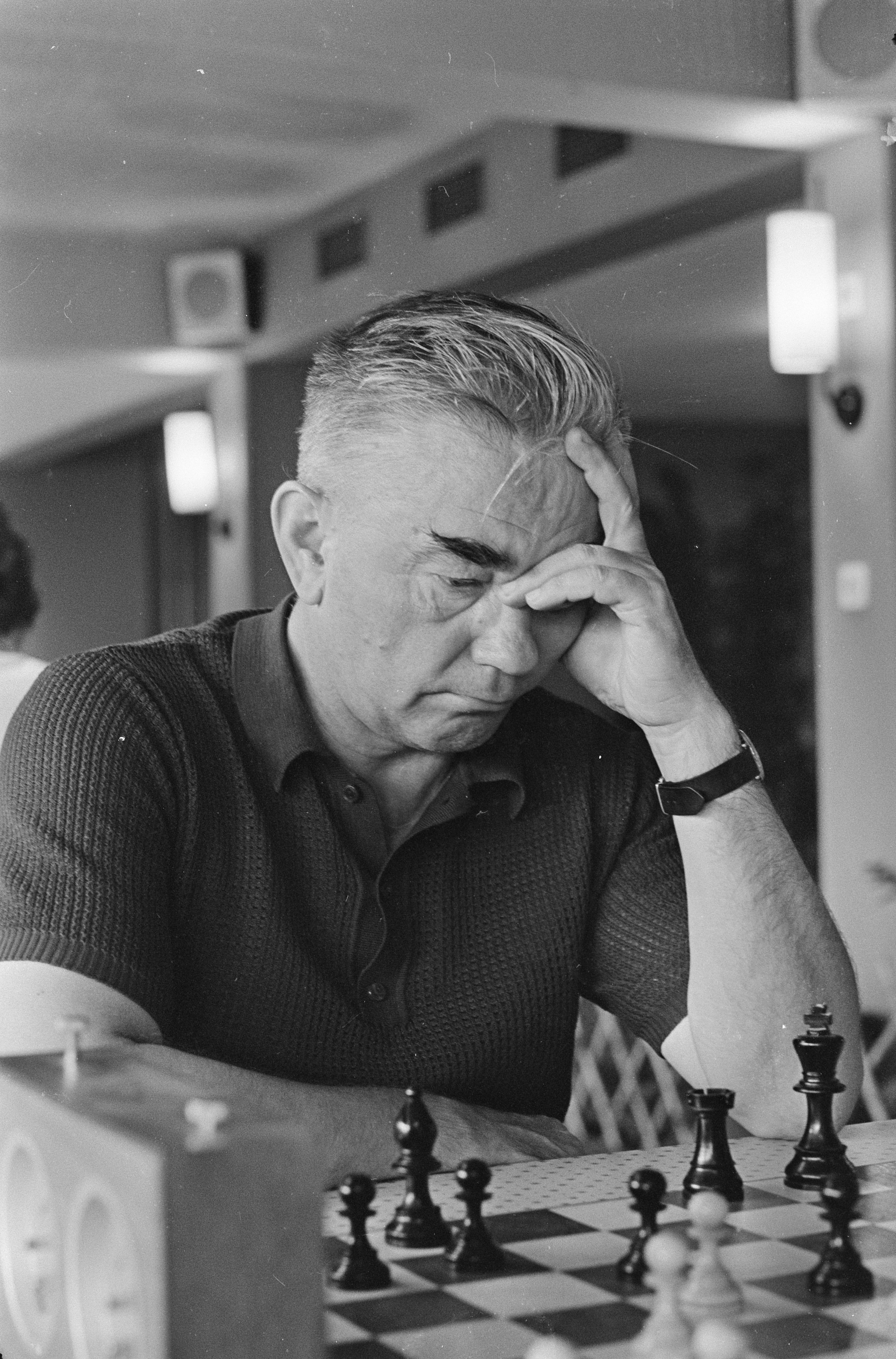
Alexander Kotov

== Table and results ==
16th Soviet Chess Championship (1948)
	Player	1	2	3	4	5	6	7	8	9	10	11	12	13	14	15	16	17	18	19	Total
1	(Soviet Union) David Bronstein	-	½	1	½	1	½	½	½	0	1	½	½	½	½	1	1	½	1	1	12
2	(Soviet Union) Alexander Kotov	½	-	½	½	0	0	1	1	1	½	1	1	0	1	0	1	1	1	1	12
3	(Soviet Union) Semyon Furman	0	½	-	0	0	1	0	½	1	0	1	1	1	½	1	1	1	1	½	11
4	(Soviet Union) Salo Flohr	½	½	1	-	½	½	1	½	½	½	½	1	1	0	½	½	½	½	½	10½
5	(Soviet Union) Alexander Tolush	0	1	1	½	-	1	0	½	½	1	½	0	0	½	1	0	1	½	1	10
6	(Soviet Union) Alexander Konstantinopolsky	½	1	0	½	0	-	½	½	1	0	1	1	1	½	½	½	0	½	½	9½
7	(Soviet Union) Georgy Lisitsin	½	0	1	0	1	½	-	½	0	0	1	0	½	1	1	½	1	½	½	9½
8	(Soviet Union) Igor Bondarevsky	½	0	½	½	½	½	½	-	½	1	½	½	0	1	½	0	1	½	1	9½
9	(Soviet Union) Paul Keres	1	0	0	½	½	0	1	½	-	½	½	½	1	0	½	1	½	½	1	9½
10	(Soviet Union) Georgy Ilivitsky	0	½	1	½	0	1	1	0	½	-	0	1	0	1	½	½	½	½	½	9
11	(Soviet Union) Andor Lilienthal	½	0	0	½	½	0	0	½	½	1	-	½	0	½	1	1	½	1	1	9
12	(Soviet Union) Ratmir Kholmov	½	0	0	0	1	0	1	½	½	0	½	-	1	1	0	½	½	½	1	8½
13	(Soviet Union) Grigory Levenfish	½	1	0	0	1	0	½	1	0	1	1	0	-	½	½	0	1	0	0	8
14	(Soviet Union) Viacheslav Ragozin	½	0	½	1	½	½	0	0	1	0	½	0	½	-	½	½	½	½	1	8
15	(Soviet Union) Yuri Averbakh	0	1	0	½	0	½	0	½	½	½	0	1	½	½	-	1	0	1	½	8
16	(Soviet Union) Vasily Panov	0	0	0	½	1	½	½	1	0	½	0	½	1	½	0	-	½	½	½	7½
17	(Soviet Union) Vladimir Alatortsev	½	0	0	½	0	1	0	0	½	½	½	½	0	½	1	½	-	1	½	7½
18	(Soviet Union) Mark Taimanov	0	0	0	½	½	½	½	½	½	½	0	½	1	½	0	½	0	-	0	6
19	(Soviet Union) Lev Aronin	0	0	½	½	0	½	½	0	0	½	0	0	1	0	½	½	½	1	-	6
