= 1933 USSR Chess Championship =

Soviet chess tournament

- Location: Leningrad

Champion
- Mikhail Botvinnik

The 1933 USSR Chess Championship was the 8th edition of USSR Chess Championship. Held from 16 August to 9 September in Leningrad. The tournament was won by Mikhail Botvinnik.

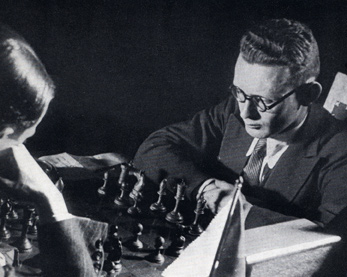
Mikhail Botvinnik in 1933

== Table and results ==
1934 USSR Chess Championship
	Player	1	2	3	4	5	6	7	8	9	10	11	12	13	14	15	16	17	18	19	20	Total
1	(Soviet Union) Mikhail Botvinnik	-	1	1	1	½	1	½	0	½	0	½	1	1	1	1	½	1	1	½	1	14
2	(Soviet Union) Vladimir Alatortsev	0	-	½	0	½	0	½	1	½	1	0	1	1	1	1	1	1	1	1	1	13
3	(Soviet Union) Grigory Levenfish	0	½	-	½	1	0	1	1	1	1	1	½	1	1	½	0	1	½	½	0	12
4	(Soviet Union) Georgy Lisitsin	0	1	½	-	½	1	1	1	0	0	0	1	½	0	1	1	½	1	1	1	12
5	(Soviet Union) Ilya Rabinovich	½	½	0	½	-	0	½	1	1	0	½	0	1	½	1	1	1	1	1	1	12
6	(Soviet Union) Vsevolod Rauzer	0	1	1	0	1	-	½	½	0	½	1	1	1	1	0	0	0	1	1	1	11½
7	(Soviet Union) Vitaly Chekhover	½	½	0	0	½	½	-	1	1	1	1	0	½	0	1	1	0	1	1	½	11
8	(Soviet Union) Fedir Bohatyrchuk	1	0	0	0	0	½	0	-	1	½	0	1	½	1	½	1	1	½	1	1	10½
9	(Soviet Union) Ilya Kan	½	½	0	1	0	1	0	0	-	1	1	0	½	½	0	1	0	1	1	1	10
10	(Soviet Union) Nikolai Riumin	1	0	0	1	1	½	0	½	0	-	½	1	½	½	½	½	0	1	½	½	9½
11	(Soviet Union) Peter Romanovsky	½	1	0	1	½	0	0	1	0	½	-	½	½	½	0	0	1	½	1	1	9½
12	(Soviet Union) Boris Verlinsky	0	0	½	0	1	0	1	0	1	0	½	-	1	0	½	1	0	½	1	1	9
13	(Soviet Union) Fyodor Yudovich	0	0	0	½	0	0	½	½	½	½	½	0	-	1	½	1	1	½	1	1	9
14	(Soviet Union) Leonid Savitsky	0	0	0	1	½	0	1	0	½	½	½	1	0	-	1	1	1	½	0	0	8½
15	(Soviet Union) Nikolai Sorokin	0	0	½	0	0	1	0	½	1	½	1	½	½	0	-	0	1	0	½	½	7½
16	(Soviet Union) Viktor Goglidze	½	0	1	0	0	1	0	0	0	½	1	0	0	0	1	-	1	½	½	0	7
17	(Soviet Union) Sergey von Freymann	0	0	0	½	0	1	1	0	1	1	0	1	0	0	0	0	-	0	½	1	7
18	(Soviet Union) Nikolai Zubarev	0	0	½	0	0	0	0	½	0	0	½	½	½	½	1	½	1	-	0	1	6½
19	(Soviet Union) Fedor Duz-Khotimirsky	½	0	½	0	0	0	0	0	0	½	0	0	0	1	½	½	½	1	-	½	5½
20	(Soviet Union) Vladimir Kirillov	0	0	1	0	0	0	½	0	0	½	0	0	0	1	½	1	0	0	½	-	5
