= 1939 USSR Chess Championship =

Soviet chess tournament

11th USSR Chess Championship (1939)
- Location: Leningrad

Champion
- Mikhail Botvinnik

The 1939 USSR Chess Championship was the 11th edition of USSR Chess Championship. Tha championship was held from 15 April to 16 May 1939 in Leningrad. The tournament was won by Mikhail Botvinnik. Semifinals took place in Moscow, Leningrad and Kiev. Alexander Kotov, later author of the classic book Think Like a Grandmaster, made his debut and finished as runner-up. Peter Romanovsky, a former champion of the 1920s, returned to compete but finishing in last place. Chess was rapidly growing in popularity in the Soviet Union, the final round, which featured the duel between Botvinnik and Kotov, sold out all available tickets.

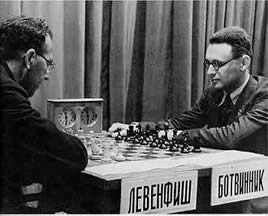
Grigory Levenfish and Mikhail Botvinnik in 1937

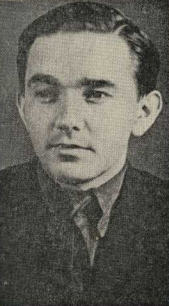
Alexander Kotov in 1939

== Table and results ==
11th USSR Chess Championship (1939)
	Player	1	2	3	4	5	6	7	8	9	10	11	12	13	14	15	16	17	18	Total
1	(Soviet Union) Mikhail Botvinnik	-	1	½	½	½	½	½	½	1	½	1	1	½	1	1	1	1	½	12½
2	(Soviet Union) Alexander Kotov	0	-	½	1	0	½	1	0	1	1	½	½	1	1	1	1	1	½	11½
3	(Soviet Union) Sergey Belavenets	½	½	-	½	1	½	1	1	½	1	0	½	½	½	½	1	½	1	11
4	(Soviet Union) Vladimir Makogonov	½	0	½	-	1	½	½	1	½	½	½	½	1	1	½	½	½	1	10½
5	(Soviet Union) Vitaly Chekhover	½	1	0	0	-	1	½	½	½	0	½	1	½	1	1	1	½	1	10½
6	(Soviet Union) Igor Bondarevsky	½	½	½	½	0	-	0	0	½	1	1	½	½	½	1	1	1	1	10
7	(Soviet Union) Georgy Lisitsin	½	0	0	½	½	1	-	1	½	0	½	½	½	1	½	½	1	½	9
8	(Soviet Union) Grigory Levenfish	½	1	0	0	½	1	0	-	½	1	½	1	0	½	0	0	1	1	8½
9	(Soviet Union) Peter Dubinin	0	0	½	½	½	½	½	½	-	½	½	1	0	½	½	1	1	½	8½
10	(Soviet Union) Viacheslav Ragozin	½	0	0	½	1	0	1	0	½	-	1	0	0	½	1	1	½	1	8½
11	(Soviet Union) Vasily Panov	0	½	1	½	½	0	½	½	½	0	-	½	½	0	½	½	1	1	8
12	(Soviet Union) Ilya Rabinovich	0	½	½	½	0	½	½	0	0	1	½	-	½	1	1	0	½	1	8
13	(Soviet Union) Mikhail Yudovich	½	0	½	0	½	½	½	1	1	1	½	½	-	½	0	0	0	½	7½
14	(Soviet Union) Ilya Kan	0	0	½	0	0	½	0	½	½	½	1	0	½	-	1	1	½	1	7½
15	(Soviet Union) Alexander Tolush	0	0	½	½	0	0	½	1	½	0	½	0	1	0	-	1	0	1	6½
16	(Soviet Union) Iosif Pogrebissky	0	0	0	½	0	0	½	1	0	0	½	1	1	0	0	-	1	1	6½
17	(Soviet Union) Alexander Chistiakov	0	0	½	½	½	0	0	0	0	½	0	½	1	½	1	0	-	0	5
18	(Soviet Union) Peter Romanovsky	½	½	0	0	0	0	½	0	½	0	0	0	½	0	0	0	1	-	3½
