= 1937 USSR Chess Championship =

Soviet chess tournament

- Location: Tbilisi

Champion
- Grigory Levenfish

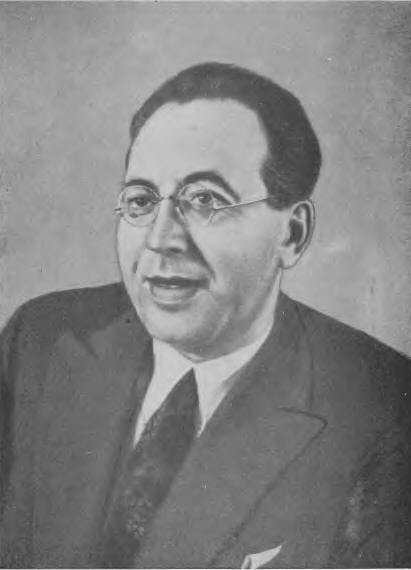
Grigory Levenfish

The 1937 USSR Chess Championship was the 10th edition of USSR Chess Championship. Held from 12 April to 14 May 1937 in Tbilisi. The tournament was won by Grigory Levenfish. Qualification was by way of the championships of Moscow, Leningrad, Kiev, as well as various other events. In October and November 1937, Botvnnik and Levenfish played a match for the Soviet title, which ended in a draw (+5 -5 =3). So Levenfish kept the title.

== Table and results ==
1937 USSR Chess Championship
	Player	1	2	3	4	5	6	7	8	9	10	11	12	13	14	15	16	17	18	19	20	Total
1	(Soviet Union) Grigory Levenfish	-	0	½	1	0	1	1	1	½	½	½	1	0	½	1	½	1	1	1	½	12½
2	(Soviet Union) Viacheslav Ragozin	1	-	½	½	½	½	1	½	½	½	1	½	½	1	0	0	½	1	1	1	12
3	(Soviet Union) Alexander Konstantinopolsky	½	½	-	½	½	½	½	0	½	½	1	1	1	½	1	1	½	½	1	½	12
4	(Soviet Union) Vladimir Makogonov	0	½	½	-	1	½	1	1	½	1	½	½	1	1	0	0	0	½	1	1	11½
5	(Soviet Union) Sergey Belavenets	1	½	½	0	-	½	1	½	½	½	1	½	0	½	½	½	1	1	0	1	11
6	(Soviet Union) Victor Goglidze	0	½	½	½	½	-	½	1	½	½	½	1	½	½	½	0	1	½	1	1	11
7	(Soviet Union) Georgy Lisitsin	0	0	½	0	0	½	-	½	1	1	½	1	1	½	1	½	½	1	½	1	11
8	(Soviet Union) Vsevolod Rauzer	0	½	1	0	½	0	½	-	½	0	½	1	½	1	1	1	1	0	1	½	10½
9	(Soviet Union) Mikhail Yudovich	½	½	½	½	½	½	0	½	-	1	½	0	1	½	1	1	½	½	0	½	10
10	(Soviet Union) Igor Bondarevsky	½	½	½	0	½	½	0	1	0	-	½	0	0	½	1	½	1	1	1	½	9½
11	(Soviet Union) Ilya Rabinovich	½	0	0	½	0	½	½	½	½	½	-	½	1	½	0	1	½	1	½	1	9½
12	(Soviet Union) Vladimir Alatortsev	0	½	0	½	½	0	0	0	1	1	½	-	½	½	0	1	1	½	1	1	9½
13	(Soviet Union) Ilya Kan	1	½	0	0	1	½	0	½	0	1	0	½	-	½	1	½	½	½	½	½	9
14	(Soviet Union) Andor Lilienthal	½	0	½	0	½	½	½	0	½	½	½	½	½	-	½	1	0	1	½	½	8½
15	(Soviet Union) Vasily Panov	0	1	0	1	½	½	0	0	0	0	1	1	0	½	-	1	0	½	0	1	8
16	(Soviet Union) Alexander Budo	½	1	0	1	½	1	½	0	0	½	0	0	½	0	0	-	1	0	½	½	7½
17	(Soviet Union) Vitaly Chekhover	0	½	½	1	0	0	½	0	½	0	½	0	½	1	1	0	-	0	½	1	7½
18	(Soviet Union) Alexander Ilyin-Genevsky	0	0	½	½	0	½	0	1	½	0	0	½	½	0	½	1	1	-	½	½	7½
19	(Soviet Union) Genrikh Kasparian	0	0	0	0	1	0	½	0	1	0	½	0	½	½	1	½	½	½	-	½	7
20	(Soviet Union) Archil Ebralidze	½	0	½	0	0	0	0	½	½	½	0	0	½	½	0	½	0	½	½	-	5
