= 1934/1935 USSR Chess Championship =

Soviet chess tournament

- Location: Leningrad

Champion
- Grigory Levenfish; Ilya Rabinovich

The 1934/1935 USSR Chess Championship was the 9th edition of USSR Chess Championship. Held from 7 December 1934 to 2 January 1935 in Leningrad. The tournament was won by Grigory Levenfish and Ilya Rabinovich. Mikhail Botvinnik did not participate because on the same date he was abroad playing the Hastings Tournament.

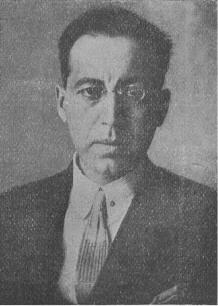
Grigory Levenfish

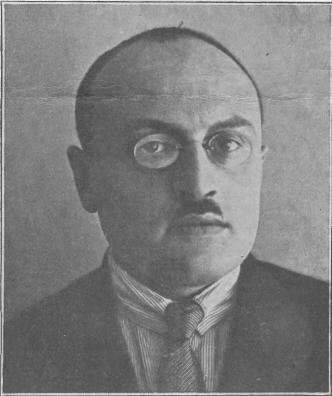
Ilya Rabinovitch

== Table and results ==
1934/1935 USSR Chess Championship
	Player	1	2	3	4	5	6	7	8	9	10	11	12	13	14	15	16	17	18	19	20	Total
1	(Soviet Union) Grigory Levenfish	-	½	½	½	0	½	1	½	0	½	1	1	½	0	1	1	½	1	1	1	12
2	(Soviet Union) Ilya Rabinovich	½	-	0	0	½	½	1	0	½	1	1	1	1	1	1	1	½	0	1	½	12
3	(Soviet Union) Fedor Bohatirchuk	½	1	-	1	½	0	0	1	½	½	0	½	½	1	0	1	1	½	1	1	11½
4	(Soviet Union) Nikolai Riumin	½	1	0	-	½	½	0	½	½	½	1	½	1	0	1	1	½	½	1	1	11½
5	(Soviet Union) Vitaly Chekhover	1	½	½	½	-	1	½	1	½	½	½	1	0	1	½	1	0	0	0	½	10½
6	(Soviet Union) Georgy Lisitsin	½	½	1	½	0	-	0	1	1	½	½	1	1	1	0	1	½	0	0	½	10½
7	(Soviet Union) Viacheslav Ragozin	0	0	1	1	½	1	-	½	1	0	1	½	½	0	½	½	½	0	1	1	10½
8	(Soviet Union) Vladimir Alatortsev	½	1	0	½	0	0	½	-	½	0	0	½	1	1	1	½	1	½	1	1	10½
9	(Soviet Union) Mikhail Yudovich	1	½	½	½	½	0	0	½	-	1	½	1	0	0	½	½	1	½	½	1	10
10	(Soviet Union) Sergey Belavenets	½	0	½	½	½	½	1	1	0	-	½	0	0	1	½	½	½	1	1	½	10
11	(Soviet Union) Vladimir Makogonov	0	0	1	0	½	½	0	1	½	½	-	0	1	1	½	1	0	1	1	½	10
12	(Soviet Union) Ilya Kan	0	0	½	½	0	0	½	½	0	1	1	-	½	1	1	½	1	1	0	1	10
13	(Soviet Union) Vasily Panov	½	0	½	0	1	0	½	0	1	1	0	½	-	0	0	0	1	1	1	1	9
14	(Soviet Union) Gavriil Veresov	1	0	0	1	0	0	1	0	1	0	0	0	1	-	1	0	1	1	0	1	9
15	(Soviet Union) Leonid Savitsky	0	0	1	0	½	1	½	0	½	½	½	0	1	0	-	0	1	1	0	1	8½
16	(Soviet Union) Isaak Mazel	0	0	0	0	0	0	½	½	½	½	0	½	1	1	1	-	½	1	1	½	8½
17	(Soviet Union) Vsevolod Rauzer	½	½	0	½	1	½	½	0	0	½	1	0	0	0	0	½	-	1	0	1	7½
18	(Soviet Union) Peter Dubinin	0	1	½	½	1	1	1	½	½	0	0	0	0	0	0	0	0	-	1	0	7
19	(Soviet Union) Alexander Ilyin-Genevsky	0	0	0	0	1	1	0	0	½	0	0	1	0	1	1	0	1	0	-	½	7
20	(Soviet Union) Sergey von Freymann	0	½	0	0	½	½	0	0	0	½	½	0	0	0	0	½	0	1	½	-	4½
