= 1931 USSR Chess Championship =

Soviet chess tournament

- Location: Moscow

Champion
- Mikhail Botvinnik

The 1931 USSR Chess Championship was the 7th edition of USSR Chess Championship. Held from 10 October to 11 November in Moscow. The tournament was won by the future world champion Mikhail Botvinnik. The competition had the largest number of players up to that edition and had an extensive set of preliminary qualifiers in which about 500 players took part.

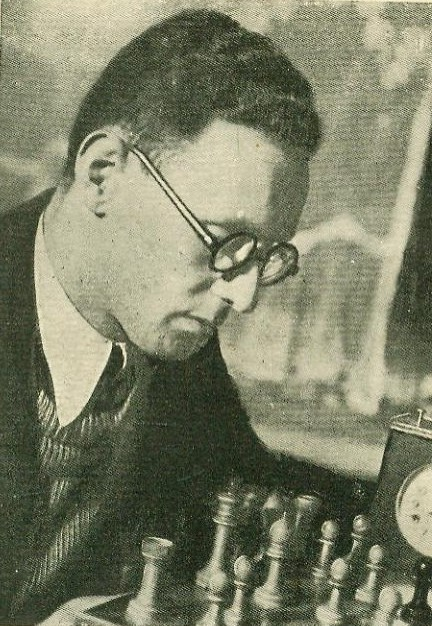
The young Mikhail Botvinnik

== Table and results ==
1931 USSR Chess Championship
	Player	1	2	3	4	5	6	7	8	9	10	11	12	13	14	15	16	17	18	Total
1	(Soviet Union) Mikhail Botvinnik	-	1	1	1	1	½	1	1	1	½	1	0	1	1	1	0	1	½	13½
2	(Soviet Union) Nikolai Riumin	0	-	1	½	½	1	½	0	½	1	0	1	1	1	½	1	1	1	11½
3	(Soviet Union) Boris Verlinsky	0	0	-	½	1	1	0	1	1	0	1	1	0	½	½	1	½	1	10
4	(Soviet Union) Vladimir Alatortsev	0	½	½	-	1	0	½	½	1	0	½	1	1	1	1	½	0	1	10
5	(Soviet Union) Mikhail Yudovich	0	½	0	0	-	1	1	0	1	½	½	1	½	1	1	½	½	1	10
6	(Soviet Union) Fedir Bohatyrchuk	½	0	0	1	0	-	½	½	0	½	1	½	½	1	1	1	1	1	10
7	(Soviet Union) Ilya Kan	0	½	1	½	0	½	-	½	0	0	1	1	½	½	1	1	1	½	9½
8	(Soviet Union) Vsevolod Rauzer	0	1	0	½	1	½	½	-	0	½	½	0	1	1	1	½	½	½	9
9	(Soviet Union) Isaak Mazel	0	½	0	0	0	1	1	1	-	½	1	1	0	0	½	1	1	½	9
10	(Soviet Union) Georgy Lisitsin	½	0	1	1	½	½	1	½	½	-	0	½	0	0	1	1	0	½	8½
11	(Soviet Union) Vladimir Kirillov	0	1	0	½	½	0	0	½	0	1	-	1	½	1	0	½	1	1	8½
12	(Soviet Union) Alexander Ilyin-Genevsky	1	0	0	0	0	½	0	1	0	½	0	-	1	1	½	1	1	1	8½
13	(Soviet Union) Nikolai Sorokin	0	0	1	0	½	½	½	0	1	1	½	0	-	1	½	0	½	0	7
14	(Soviet Union) Abram Zamikhovsky	0	0	½	0	0	0	½	0	1	1	0	0	0	-	½	1	1	1	6½
15	(Soviet Union) Victor Goglidze	0	½	½	0	0	0	0	0	½	0	1	½	½	½	-	0	1	1	6
16	(Soviet Union) Veniamin Sozin	1	0	0	½	½	0	0	½	0	0	½	0	1	0	1	-	½	0	5½
17	(Soviet Union) Genrikh Kasparian	0	0	½	1	½	0	0	½	0	1	0	0	½	0	0	½	-	½	5
18	(Soviet Union) Alexander Budo	½	0	0	0	0	0	½	½	½	½	0	0	1	0	0	1	½	-	5
