= 1976 USSR Chess Championship =

Soviet chess championship

44th USSR Chess Championship
- Location: Moscow

Champion
- Anatoly Karpov

The 1976 Soviet Chess Championship was the 44th edition of the USSR Chess Championship. Held from 26 November to 24 December 1976 in Moscow. The world champion Anatoly Karpov won his first USSR Chess Championship title. The qualifying tournaments took place in Minsk and Rostov-on-Don.

== Table and results ==
44th USSR Chess Championship
	Player	Rating	1	2	3	4	5	6	7	8	9	10	11	12	13	14	15	16	17	18	Total
1	(Soviet Union) Anatoly Karpov	2695	-	1	½	½	1	½	½	0	½	½	1	1	1	½	½	1	1	1	12
2	(Soviet Union) Yuri Balashov	2545	0	-	½	1	½	½	½	½	1	1	1	½	½	½	½	½	1	1	11
3	(Soviet Union) Tigran Petrosian	2635	½	½	-	½	½	0	½	½	1	1	1	0	½	½	1	½	1	1	10½
4	(Soviet Union) Lev Polugaevsky	2635	½	0	½	-	½	½	1	½	½	0	1	½	1	1	½	1	½	1	10½
5	(Soviet Union) Josif Dorfman	2405	0	½	½	½	-	½	½	0	0	1	1	1	½	1	1	½	0	1	9½
6	(Soviet Union) Mikhail Tal	2615	½	½	1	½	½	-	½	½	½	0	½	½	0	½	½	½	1	1	9
7	(Soviet Union) Vassily Smyslov	2580	½	½	½	0	½	½	-	½	½	1	½	0	1	½	1	½	1	0	9
8	(Soviet Union) Efim Geller	2620	1	½	½	½	1	½	½	-	0	0	½	1	1	0	½	½	½	0	8½
9	(Soviet Union) Evgeny Sveshnikov	2510	½	0	0	½	1	½	½	1	-	0	½	½	1	½	1	½	½	0	8½
10	(Soviet Union) Oleg Romanishin	2560	½	0	0	1	0	1	0	1	1	-	0	½	1	0	½	1	0	1	8½
11	(Soviet Union) Boris Gulko	2530	0	0	0	0	0	½	½	½	½	1	-	½	0	1	½	1	1	1	8
12	(Soviet Union) Rafael Vaganian	2550	0	½	1	½	0	½	1	0	½	½	½	-	½	1	0	0	½	½	7½
13	(Soviet Union) Karen Grigorian	2485	0	½	½	0	½	1	0	0	0	0	1	½	-	½	½	1	½	1	7½
14	(Soviet Union) Mark Taimanov	2540	½	½	½	0	0	½	½	1	½	1	0	0	½	-	0	1	½	0	7
15	(Soviet Union) Nukhim Rashkovsky	2485	½	½	0	½	0	½	0	½	0	½	½	1	½	1	-	0	½	½	7
16	(Soviet Union) Alexander Zakharov	2435	0	½	½	0	½	½	½	½	½	0	0	1	0	0	1	-	0	1	6½
17	(Soviet Union) Vitaly Tseshkovsky	2550	0	0	0	½	1	0	0	½	½	1	0	½	½	½	½	1	-	0	6½
18	(Soviet Union) Viktor Kupreichik	2490	0	0	0	0	0	0	1	1	1	0	0	½	0	1	½	0	1	-	6

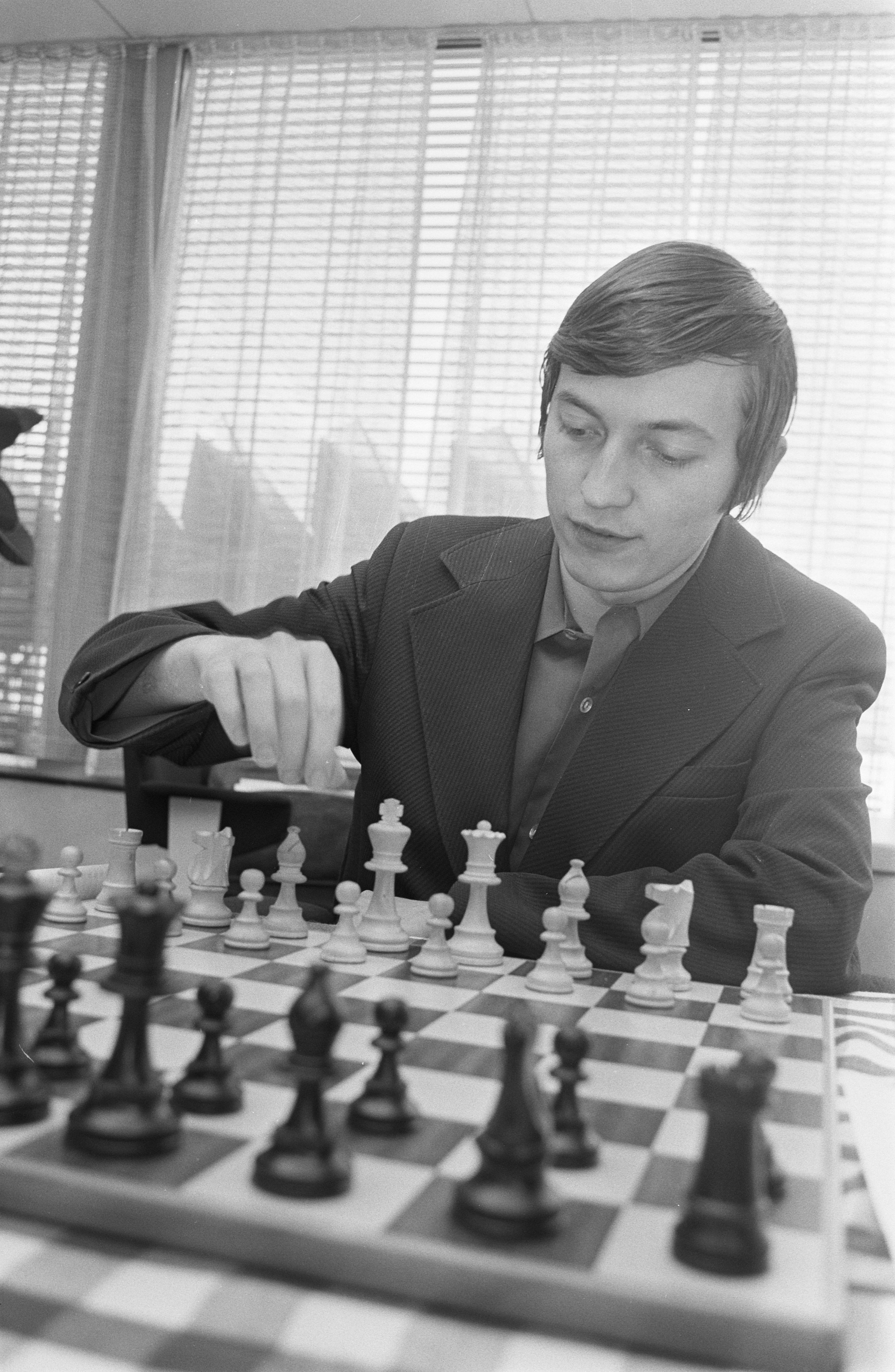
Anatoly Karpov playing in the championship
