= 1990 USSR Chess Championship =

Soviet chess tournament

57th USSR Chess Championship
- Location: Leningrad

Champion
- Alexander Beliavsky

The 1990 Soviet Chess Championship was the 57th edition of USSR Chess Championship. Held from 18 October to 5 November 1990 in Leningrad. The title was won by Alexander Beliavsky. Semifinals took place at Gorky, Daugavpils and Kherson.

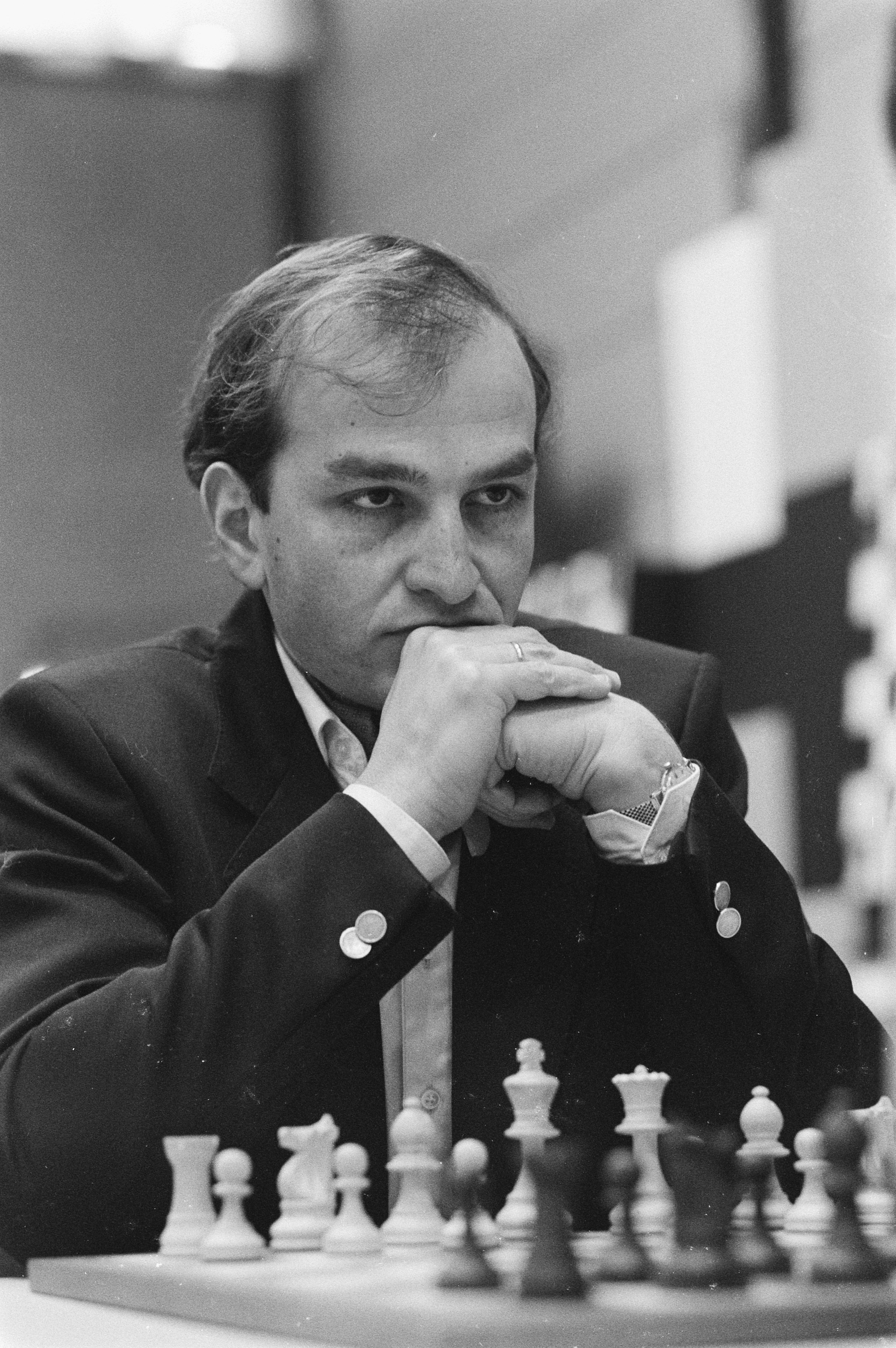
Alexander Beliavsky

== Semifinals ==
The semifinals were played late in 1989. At Gorky, Vyzhmanavin (10/13), Dvoiris 9 and Dreev 8½ classified. At the Latvian venue of Daugavpils, Smirin, Rozentalis and Aseev made 10/14; while Alexey Shirov finished with only 8. Kherson in Ukraine, Novikov and G.Kuzmin had 10½/15.

== Final ==
57th USSR Chess Championship
	Player	Rating	1	2	3	4	5	6	7	8	9	10	11	12	13	14	Total
1	(Soviet Union) Alexander Beliavsky	2605	-	½	1	1	½	½	½	1	½	0	½	1	½	1	8½
2	(Soviet Union) Leonid Yudasin	2615	½	-	½	½	½	½	½	½	½	1	1	½	1	1	8½
3	(Soviet Union) Evgeny Bareev	2590	0	½	-	½	0	1	1	½	1	1	½	1	1	½	8½
4	(Soviet Union) Alexey Vyzmanavin	2585	0	½	½	-	½	½	½	½	½	1	1	1	1	1	8½
5	(Soviet Union) Vladimir Epishin	2590	½	½	1	½	-	½	½	½	½	1	0	1	½	½	7½
6	(Soviet Union) Alexander Khalifman	2615	½	½	0	½	½	-	1	½	1	½	1	½	½	½	7½
7	(Soviet Union) Gennadi Kuzmin	2540	½	½	0	½	½	0	-	1	½	½	1	½	0	½	6
8	(Soviet Union) Eduardas Rozentalis	2565	0	½	½	½	½	½	0	-	½	½	½	½	1	½	6
9	(Soviet Union) Vereslav Eingorn	2550	½	½	0	½	½	0	½	½	-	½	½	½	½	1	6
10	(Soviet Union) Alexander Schneider	2560	1	0	0	0	0	½	½	½	½	-	1	½	½	½	5½
11	(Soviet Union) Semen Dvoirys	2555	½	0	½	0	1	0	0	½	½	0	-	½	1	1	5½
12	(Soviet Union) Igor Novikov	2575	0	½	0	0	0	½	½	½	½	½	½	-	½	1	5
13	(Soviet Union) Konstantin Aseev	2575	½	0	0	0	½	½	1	0	½	½	0	½	-	0	4
14	(Soviet Union) Ilia Smirin	2555	0	0	½	0	½	½	½	½	0	½	0	0	1	-	4
