= 1971 USSR Chess Championship =

Soviet chess tournament

39th Soviet Chess Championship
- Location: Leningrad

Champion
- Vladimir Savon

The 1971 Soviet Chess Championship was the 39th edition of USSR Chess Championship. Held from 15 September to 18 October 1971 in Leningrad. The tournament was won by Vladimir Savon. It was an amazing result, the title fell to the little-known international master Savon. He only learned the moves at the late age of 13, and lived in a small country settlement where he could find no strong opposition. The final were preceded by semifinals events at Daugavpils, Ivano Frankivsk, Novosibirsk and Perm.

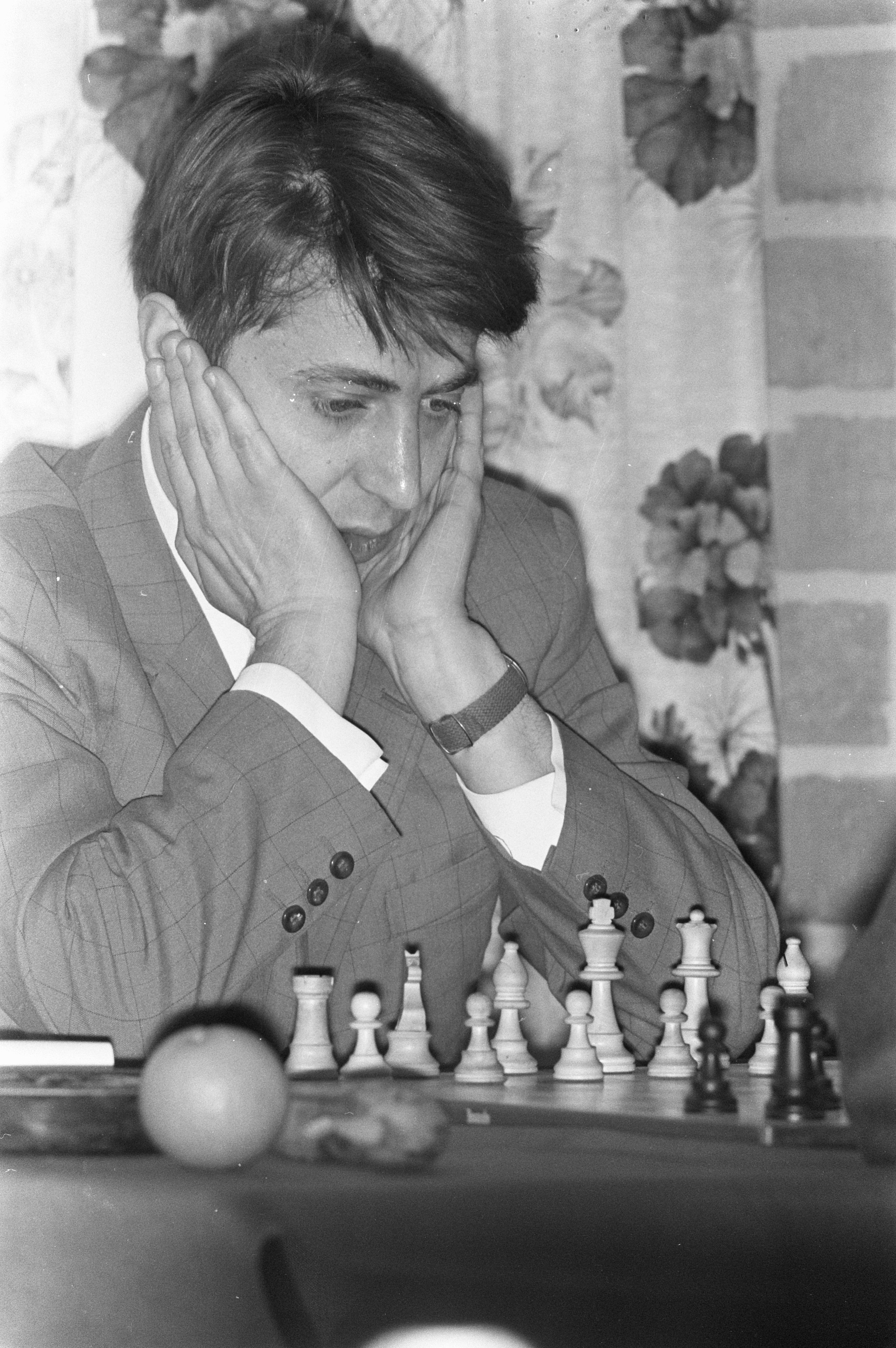
Vladimir Savon

== Table and results ==
39th Soviet Chess Championship
	Player	1	2	3	4	5	6	7	8	9	10	11	12	13	14	15	16	17	18	19	20	21	22	Total
1	(Soviet Union) Vladimir Savon	-	½	½	½	1	1	½	1	½	½	1	1	1	½	½	1	½	½	½	½	1	1	15
2	(Soviet Union) Vassily Smyslov	½	-	½	1	½	½	½	½	½	½	½	½	½	½	1	½	½	1	1	1	½	1	13½
3	(Soviet Union) Mikhail Tal	½	½	-	½	0	1	1	0	½	½	1	½	1	1	½	0	1	1	1	½	½	1	13½
4	(Soviet Union) Anatoly Karpov	½	0	½	-	1	½	½	½	1	½	½	½	½	½	½	1	0	1	1	1	½	1	13
5	(Soviet Union) Leonid Stein	0	½	1	0	-	0	½	1	1	0	1	½	½	½	½	1	½	½	1	0	1	1	12
6	(Soviet Union) Yuri Balashov	0	½	0	½	1	-	1	½	½	0	0	½	0	½	1	½	1	½	1	1	1	1	12
7	(Soviet Union) David Bronstein	½	½	0	½	½	0	-	1	½	1	½	½	1	1	0	1	1	0	½	0	½	1	11½
8	(Soviet Union) Lev Polugaevsky	0	½	1	½	0	½	0	-	1	1	½	½	1	½	½	½	½	1	½	1	½	0	11½
9	(Soviet Union) Mark Taimanov	½	½	½	0	0	½	½	0	-	1	1	½	0	1	½	½	1	½	0	1	½	1	11
10	(Soviet Union) Albert Kapengut	½	½	½	½	1	1	0	0	0	-	½	½	0	0	½	½	½	1	0	1	1	1	10½
11	(Soviet Union) Nikolai Krogius	0	½	0	½	0	1	½	½	0	½	-	0	½	1	1	½	1	½	1	½	½	½	10½
12	(Soviet Union) Igor Platonov	0	½	½	½	½	½	½	½	½	½	1	-	½	½	0	0	0	1	½	1	1	0	10
13	(Soviet Union) Anatoly Lein	0	½	0	½	½	1	0	0	1	1	½	½	-	0	1	0	½	0	1	½	½	1	10
14	(Soviet Union) Efim Geller	½	½	0	½	½	½	0	½	0	1	0	½	1	-	1	0	½	0	½	½	½	1	9½
15	(Soviet Union) Vladimir Karasev	½	0	½	½	½	0	1	½	½	½	0	1	0	0	-	1	½	½	½	0	1	0	9
16	(Soviet Union) Leonid Shamkovich	0	½	1	0	0	½	0	½	½	½	½	1	1	1	0	-	0	½	0	1	½	0	9
17	(Soviet Union) Rafael Vaganian	½	½	0	1	½	0	0	½	0	½	0	1	½	½	½	1	-	0	0	½	1	0	8½
18	(Soviet Union) Vladimir Tukmakov	½	0	0	0	½	½	1	0	½	0	½	0	1	1	½	½	1	-	0	½	0	½	8½
19	(Soviet Union) Yuri Nikolaevsky	½	0	0	0	0	0	½	½	1	1	0	½	0	½	½	1	1	1	-	0	½	0	8½
20	(Soviet Union) Karen Grigorian	½	0	½	0	1	0	1	0	0	0	½	0	½	½	1	0	½	½	1	-	0	½	8
21	(Soviet Union) Roman Dzindzichashvili	0	½	½	½	0	0	½	½	½	0	½	0	½	½	0	½	0	1	½	1	-	½	8
22	(Soviet Union) Mark Tseitlin	0	0	0	0	0	0	0	1	0	0	½	1	0	0	1	1	1	½	1	½	½	-	8
