= 1949 USSR Chess Championship =

Soviet chess tournament

17th Soviet Chess Championship (1949)
- Location: Moscow

Champion
- Vassily Smyslov; David Bronstein

The 1949 Soviet Chess Championship was the 17th edition of USSR Chess Championship. Held from 16 October to 20 November 1949 in Moscow. The tournament was won by Vassily Smyslov and David Bronstein. Mikhail Botvinnik did not participate in the championship again, he was to take a three-year break, to work on his doctorate. Semifinals tournaments were played in the cities of Moscow, Leningrad, Tbilisi and Vilnius.

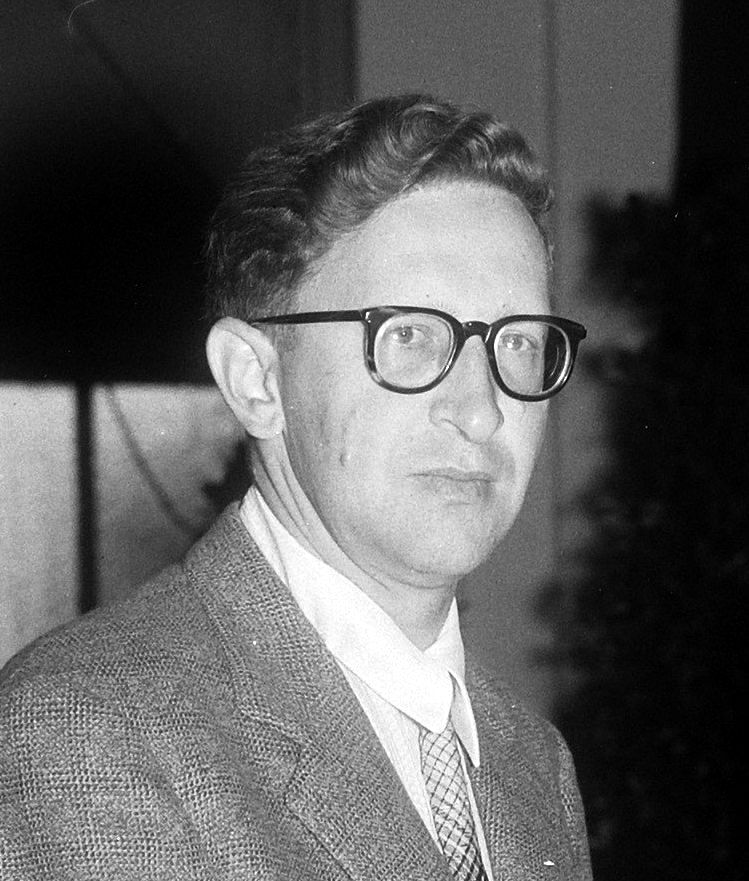
Vassily Smyslov

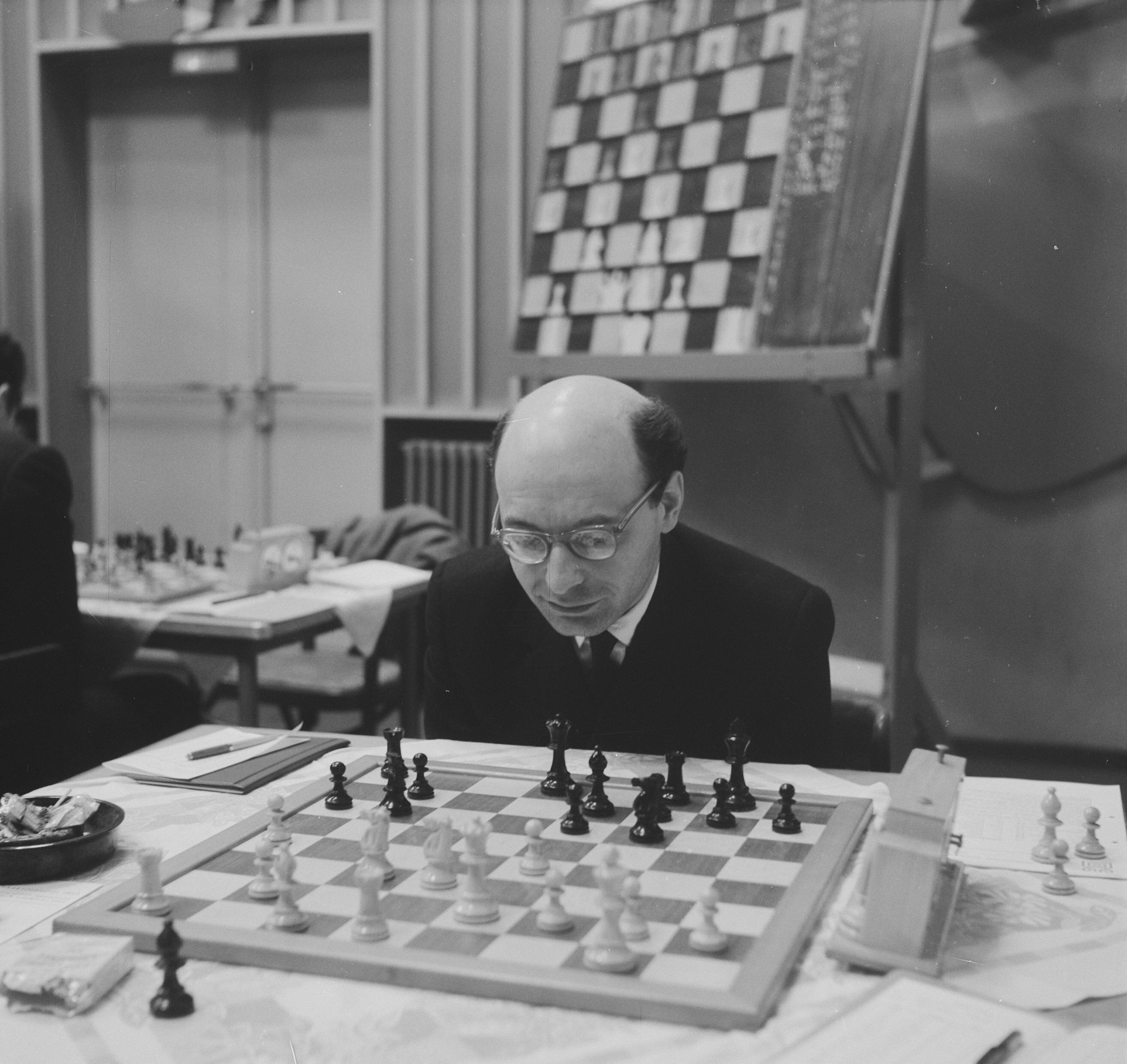
David Bronstein

== Table and results ==
17th Soviet Chess Championship (1949)
	Player	1	2	3	4	5	6	7	8	9	10	11	12	13	14	15	16	17	18	19	20	Total
1	(Soviet Union) Vassily Smyslov	-	1	½	½	0	½	½	½	1	1	1	½	1	½	½	1	1	0	1	1	13
2	(Soviet Union) David Bronstein	0	-	½	½	½	½	½	1	½	1	½	1	½	1	1	½	1	1	½	1	13
3	(Soviet Union) Efim Geller	½	½	-	½	1	1	1	0	½	0	1	0	0	½	1	1	1	1	1	1	12½
4	(Soviet Union) Mark Taimanov	½	½	½	-	0	½	½	1	1	½	½	1	½	1	1	½	½	½	1	1	12½
5	(Soviet Union) Semyon Furman	1	½	0	1	-	1	0	1	½	½	½	½	1	0	0	1	0	1	1	1	11½
6	(Soviet Union) Isaac Boleslavsky	½	½	0	½	0	-	½	½	1	1	½	½	½	1	1	½	1	½	1	½	11½
7	(Soviet Union) Alexander Kotov	½	½	0	½	1	½	-	½	0	½	1	0	½	0	1	1	1	1	1	1	11½
8	(Soviet Union) Paul Keres	½	0	1	0	0	½	½	-	½	½	½	1	1	1	½	1	1	1	0	½	11
9	(Soviet Union) Lev Aronin	0	½	½	0	½	0	1	½	-	½	½	½	½	1	1	½	½	1	½	½	10
10	(Soviet Union) Ratmir Kholmov	0	0	1	½	½	0	½	½	½	-	½	0	1	½	1	½	½	1	1	½	10
11	(Soviet Union) Salo Flohr	0	½	0	½	½	½	0	½	½	½	-	½	1	½	½	1	½	1	0	½	9
12	(Soviet Union) Alexey Sokolsky	½	0	1	0	½	½	1	0	½	1	½	-	½	½	0	½	½	0	½	½	8½
13	(Soviet Union) Andor Lilienthal	0	½	1	½	0	½	½	0	½	0	0	½	-	½	1	0	1	½	½	½	8
14	(Soviet Union) Vladas Mikenas	½	0	½	0	1	0	1	0	0	½	½	½	½	-	0	0	1	½	½	1	8
15	(Soviet Union) Nikolai Kopilov	½	0	0	0	1	0	0	½	0	0	½	1	0	1	-	½	1	½	½	1	8
16	(Soviet Union) Tigran Petrosian	0	½	0	½	0	½	0	0	½	½	0	½	1	1	½	-	0	1	1	0	7½
17	(Soviet Union) Viacheslav Ragozin	0	0	0	½	1	0	0	0	½	½	½	½	0	0	0	1	-	½	½	1	6½
18	(Soviet Union) Grigory Levenfish	1	0	0	½	0	½	0	0	0	0	0	1	½	½	½	0	½	-	1	0	6
19	(Soviet Union) Victor Liublinsky	0	½	0	0	0	0	0	1	½	0	1	½	½	½	½	0	½	0	-	½	6
20	(Soviet Union) Grigory Goldberg	0	0	0	0	0	½	0	½	½	½	½	½	½	0	0	1	0	1	½	-	6
