= 1944 USSR Chess Championship =

Soviet chess tournament

13th Soviet Chess Championship (1944)
- Location: Moscow
- Date: 21 May – 17 June 1944

Champion
- Mikhail Botvinnik

The 1944 Soviet Chess Championship was the 13th edition of USSR Chess Championship, and the first to be held since 1940. The tournament was won by Mikhail Botvinnik.

== Tables and results ==
13th Soviet Chess Championship (1944)
| | Player | 1 | 2 | 3 | 4 | 5 | 6 | 7 | 8 | 9 | 10 | 11 | 12 | 13 | 14 | 15 | 16 | 17 | Total |
|---|---|---|---|---|---|---|---|---|---|---|---|---|---|---|---|---|---|---|---|
| 1 | (Soviet Union) Mikhail Botvinnik | - | 1 | 1 | 1 | 1 | ½ | 0 | 1 | ½ | 1 | ½ | 1 | 1 | 1 | 0 | 1 | 1 | 12½ |
| 2 | (Soviet Union) Vassily Smyslov | 0 | - | 0 | ½ | 1 | 1 | 1 | 0 | ½ | 1 | 1 | 1 | ½ | 1 | ½ | ½ | 1 | 10½ |
| 3 | (Soviet Union) Isaac Boleslavsky | 0 | 1 | - | ½ | ½ | ½ | 1 | 1 | 0 | ½ | ½ | 1 | 1 | 1 | ½ | ½ | ½ | 10 |
| 4 | (Soviet Union) Salo Flohr | 0 | ½ | ½ | - | ½ | ½ | 1 | ½ | ½ | ½ | 0 | ½ | 1 | 1 | 1 | ½ | 1 | 9½ |
| 5 | (Soviet Union) Vladas Mikenas | 0 | 0 | ½ | ½ | - | ½ | 1 | 0 | 1 | ½ | 1 | 1 | 1 | 0 | 1 | 0 | 1 | 9 |
| 6 | (Soviet Union) Vladimir Makogonov | ½ | 0 | ½ | ½ | ½ | - | 0 | 0 | 1 | 0 | 1 | ½ | 1 | 1 | ½ | 1 | 1 | 9 |
| 7 | (Soviet Union) Alexander Tolush | 1 | 0 | 0 | 0 | 0 | 1 | - | ½ | 1 | 1 | 1 | 1 | 0 | 0 | 0 | 1 | 1 | 8½ |
| 8 | (Soviet Union) Andor Lilienthal | 0 | 1 | 0 | ½ | 1 | 1 | ½ | - | ½ | ½ | 0 | 0 | 1 | ½ | 0 | ½ | ½ | 7½ |
| 9 | (Soviet Union) Alexey Sokolsky | ½ | ½ | 1 | ½ | 0 | 0 | 0 | ½ | - | 0 | 0 | ½ | 1 | 1 | 1 | 1 | 0 | 7½ |
| 10 | (Soviet Union) Gavriil Veresov | 0 | 0 | ½ | ½ | ½ | 1 | 0 | ½ | 1 | - | 1 | 0 | 0 | 0 | 1 | 1 | ½ | 7½ |
| 11 | (Soviet Union) Viacheslav Ragozin | ½ | 0 | ½ | 1 | 0 | 0 | 0 | 1 | 1 | 0 | - | 0 | 1 | ½ | 0 | ½ | 1 | 7 |
| 12 | (Soviet Union) Alexander Kotov | 0 | 0 | 0 | ½ | 0 | ½ | 0 | 1 | ½ | 1 | 1 | - | 0 | ½ | 1 | 1 | 0 | 7 |
| 13 | (Soviet Union) Abram Khavin | 0 | ½ | 0 | 0 | 0 | 0 | 1 | 0 | 0 | 1 | 0 | 1 | - | 1 | 1 | 1 | ½ | 7 |
| 14 | (Soviet Union) Georgy Lisitsin | 0 | 0 | 0 | 0 | 1 | 0 | 1 | ½ | 0 | 1 | ½ | ½ | 0 | - | ½ | 1 | 1 | 7 |
| 15 | (Soviet Union) David Bronstein | 1 | ½ | ½ | 0 | 0 | ½ | 1 | 1 | 0 | 0 | 1 | 0 | 0 | ½ | - | 0 | ½ | 6½ |
| 16 | (Soviet Union) Vladimir Alatortsev | 0 | ½ | ½ | ½ | 1 | 0 | 0 | ½ | 0 | 0 | ½ | 0 | 0 | 0 | 1 | - | 1 | 5½ |
| 17 | (Soviet Union) Grigory Ravinsky | 0 | 0 | ½ | 0 | 0 | 0 | 0 | ½ | 1 | ½ | 0 | 1 | ½ | 0 | ½ | 0 | - | 4½ |
