= 1962 USSR Chess Championship =

Soviet chess tournament

30th Soviet Chess Championship (1962)
- Location: Yerevan

Champion
- Viktor Korchnoi

The 1962 Soviet Chess Championship was the 30th edition of USSR Chess Championship. Held from 21 November to 20 December 1962 in Yerevan. The tournament was won by Viktor Korchnoi. It was preceded by six semifinals events at Dnipropetrovsk, Novosibirsk, Riga and three of which were simultaneously the finals of the championships of the sports societies Spartak, Trud and Burevestnik.

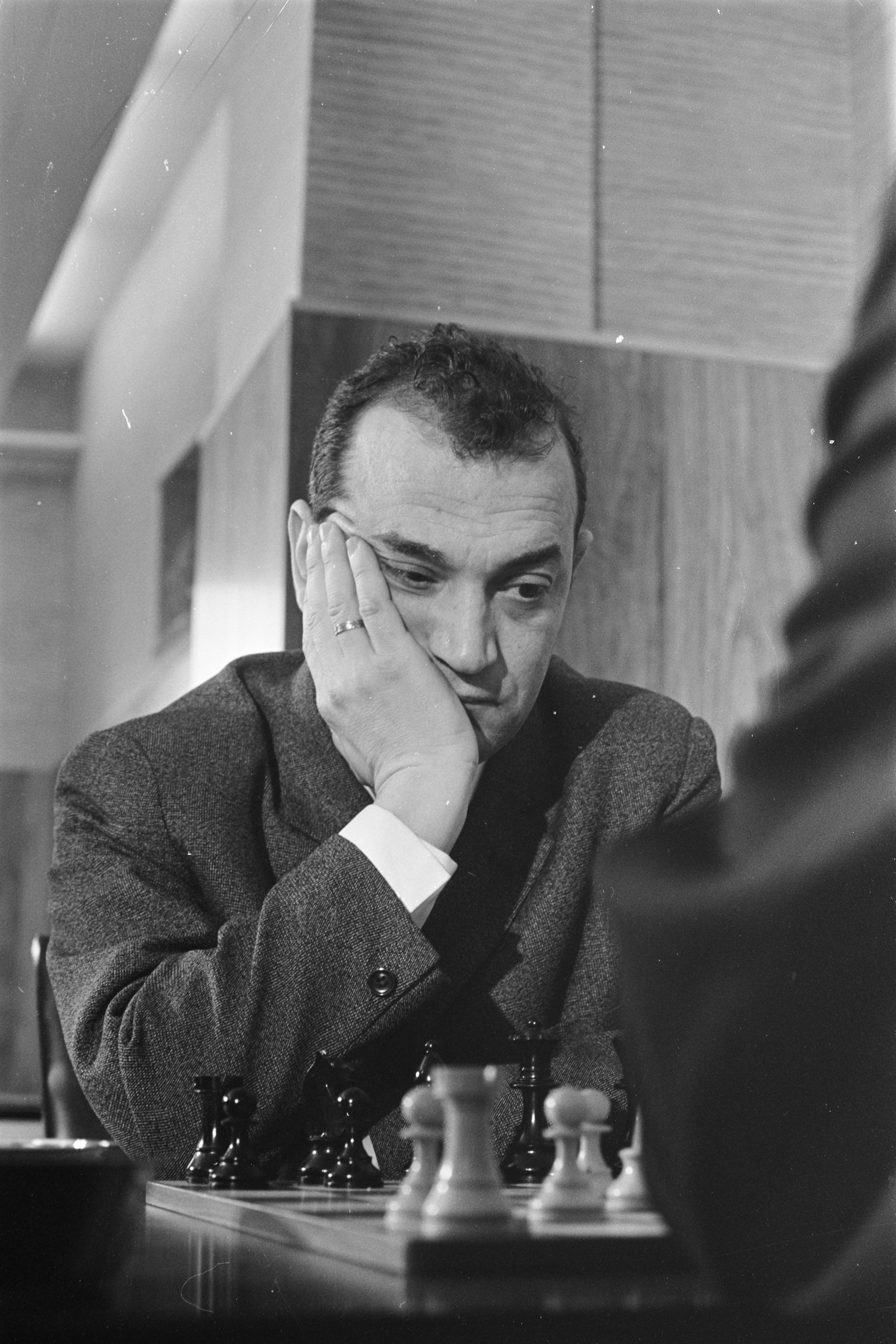
Viktor Korchnoi

== Table and results ==
30th Soviet Chess Championship (1962)
	Player	1	2	3	4	5	6	7	8	9	10	11	12	13	14	15	16	17	18	19	20	Total
1	(Soviet Union) Viktor Korchnoi	-	1	½	½	1	1	½	1	½	0	1	½	1	1	1	½	½	½	1	1	14
2	(Soviet Union) Mikhail Tal	0	-	1	1	½	½	0	1	1	0	1	½	½	1	1	1	1	1	½	1	13½
3	(Soviet Union) Mark Taimanov	½	0	-	½	0	½	1	½	1	1	1	1	1	1	1	½	½	1	1	½	13½
4	(Soviet Union) Ratmir Kholmov	½	0	½	-	0	1	1	1	½	½	½	1	½	1	½	1	½	1	1	1	13
5	(Soviet Union) Boris Spassky	0	½	1	1	-	0	1	0	½	1	½	1	½	½	½	½	1	1	1	1	12½
6	(Soviet Union) Leonid Stein	0	½	½	0	1	-	½	0	½	1	1	½	½	1	1	1	½	0	1	1	11½
7	(Soviet Union) Lev Aronin	½	1	0	0	0	½	-	½	1	½	1	0	1	0	1	1	1	½	½	½	10½
8	(Soviet Union) Anatoly Bannik	0	0	½	0	1	1	½	-	0	1	½	1	½	0	½	½	1	½	1	1	10½
9	(Soviet Union) Yury Kots	½	0	0	½	½	½	0	1	-	½	½	0	1	½	1	1	½	½	½	1	10
10	(Soviet Union) Vladas Mikenas	1	1	0	½	0	0	½	0	½	-	0	1	½	½	½	0	½	1	½	1	9
11	(Soviet Union) Nikolai Krogius	0	0	0	½	½	0	0	½	½	1	-	½	½	½	½	½	1	1	½	½	8½
12	(Soviet Union) Vladislav Shianovsky	½	½	0	0	0	½	1	0	1	0	½	-	0	1	½	½	0	1	½	½	8
13	(Soviet Union) Alexander Zaitsev	0	½	0	½	½	½	0	½	0	½	½	1	-	½	0	1	0	½	1	½	8
14	(Soviet Union) Alexey Suetin	0	0	0	0	½	0	1	1	½	½	½	0	½	-	0	1	½	½	½	1	8
15	(Soviet Union) Arkady Novopashin	0	0	0	½	½	0	0	½	0	½	½	½	1	1	-	½	½	1	½	½	8
16	(Soviet Union) German Khodos	½	0	½	0	½	0	0	½	0	1	½	½	0	0	½	-	1	0	½	1	7
17	(Soviet Union) Eduard Mnatsakanian	½	0	½	½	0	½	0	0	½	½	0	1	1	½	½	0	-	0	½	0	6½
18	(Soviet Union) Alexander Korelov	½	0	0	0	0	1	½	½	½	0	0	0	½	½	0	1	1	-	0	½	6½
19	(Soviet Union) Igor Zaitsev	0	½	0	0	0	0	½	0	½	½	½	½	0	½	½	½	½	1	-	0	6
20	(Soviet Union) Vladimir Savon	0	0	½	0	0	0	½	0	0	0	½	½	½	0	½	0	1	½	1	-	5½
