= 1966 USSR Chess Championship =

Soviet chess tournament

34th Soviet Chess Championship
- Location: Tbilisi

Champion
- Leonid Stein

The 1966 Soviet Chess Championship was the 34th edition of USSR Chess Championship. Held from 28 December 1966 to 2 February 1967 in Tbilisi. The tournament was won by Leonid Stein. The final were preceded by semifinals events at Irkutsk, Krasnodar and Oryol.

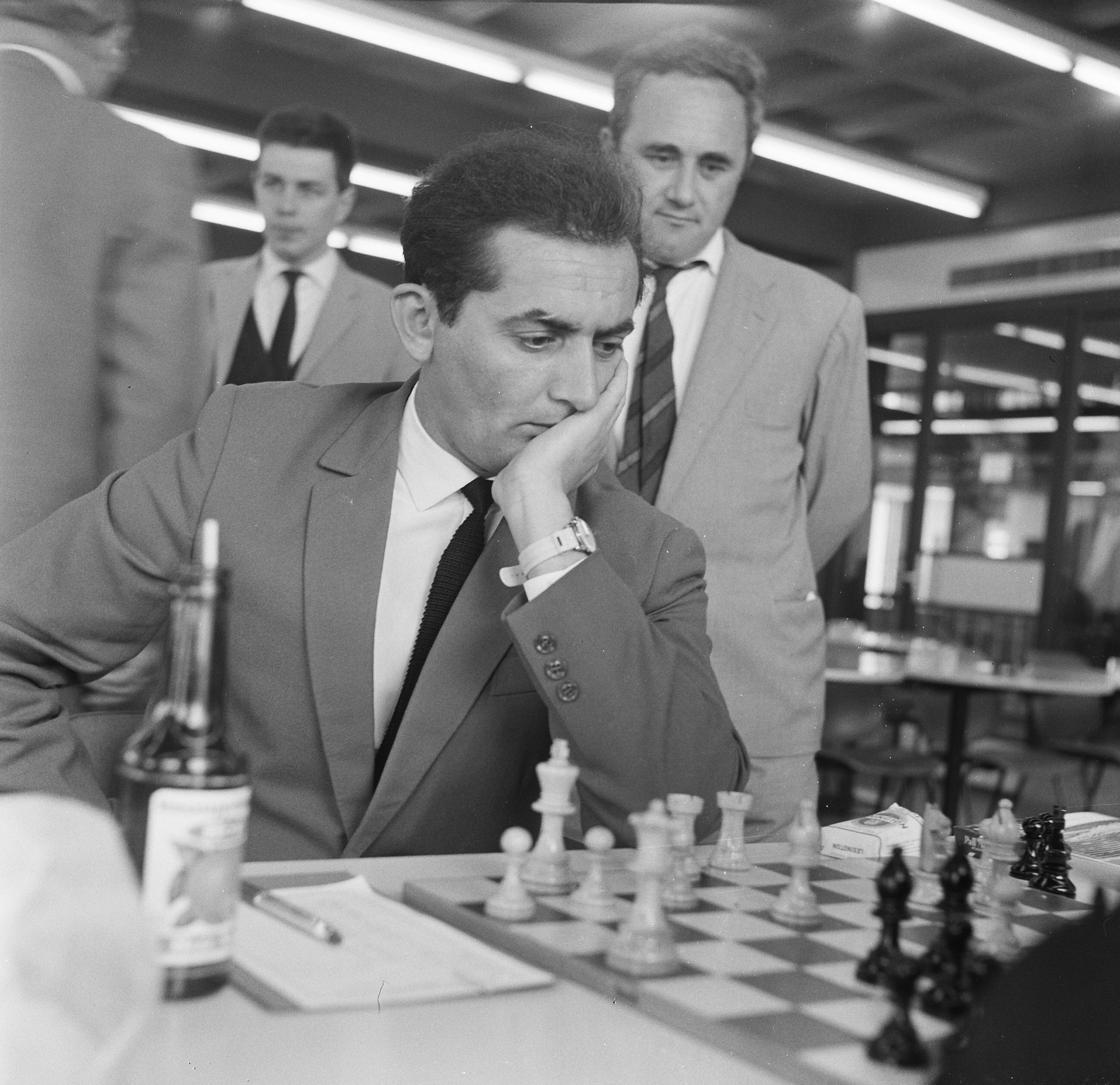
Leonid Stein

== Table and results ==
34th Soviet Chess Championship
	Player	1	2	3	4	5	6	7	8	9	10	11	12	13	14	15	16	17	18	19	20	21	Total
1	(Soviet Union) Leonid Stein	-	0	½	½	1	1	1	0	1	½	1	½	½	½	½	1	½	1	½	½	1	13
2	(Soviet Union) Efim Geller	1	-	½	½	½	1	½	½	1	½	½	½	½	0	1	½	½	½	½	1	1	12½
3	(Soviet Union) Aivars Gipslis	½	½	-	½	1	½	½	½	½	½	0	1	1	1	½	1	½	½	½	1	0	12
4	(Soviet Union) Viktor Korchnoi	½	½	½	-	½	½	½	½	½	½	½	½	½	1	½	½	1	½	1	½	1	12
5	(Soviet Union) Mark Taimanov	0	½	0	½	-	½	0	½	½	1	1	1	1	½	½	1	½	1	½	½	1	12
6	(Soviet Union) Anatoly Lein	0	0	½	½	½	-	½	1	½	1	½	1	1	1	½	0	1	½	1	0	½	11½
7	(Soviet Union) Nikolai Krogius	0	½	½	½	1	½	-	½	1	½	½	½	½	0	0	½	1	½	½	1	1	11
8	(Soviet Union) Lev Polugaevsky	1	½	½	½	½	0	½	-	0	½	½	½	0	0	1	½	0	1	1	1	1	10½
9	(Soviet Union) David Bronstein	0	0	½	½	½	½	0	1	-	½	½	½	1	0	½	1	½	½	1	1	½	10½
10	(Soviet Union) Vassily Smyslov	½	½	½	½	0	0	½	½	½	-	1	1	1	½	0	½	½	0	½	½	1	10
11	(Soviet Union) Ratmir Kholmov	0	½	1	½	0	½	½	½	½	0	-	½	½	½	½	½	½	1	½	½	1	10
12	(Soviet Union) Vladimir Savon	½	½	0	½	0	0	½	½	½	0	½	-	½	1	1	½	½	½	1	1	½	10
13	(Soviet Union) Eduard Gufeld	½	½	0	½	0	0	½	1	0	0	½	½	-	½	1	½	1	½	½	½	1	9½
14	(Soviet Union) Viatcheslav Osnos	½	1	0	0	½	0	1	1	1	½	½	0	½	-	½	0	½	½	½	0	½	9
15	(Soviet Union) Evgeni Vasiukov	½	0	½	½	½	½	1	0	½	1	½	0	0	½	-	1	0	1	½	0	½	9
16	(Soviet Union) Bukhuti Gurgenidze	0	½	0	½	0	1	½	½	0	½	½	½	½	1	0	-	½	½	0	1	1	9
17	(Soviet Union) Alexey Suetin	½	½	½	0	½	0	0	1	½	½	½	½	0	½	1	½	-	0	½	½	½	8½
18	(Soviet Union) Vladimir Liberzon	0	½	½	½	0	½	½	0	½	1	0	½	½	½	0	½	1	-	½	0	½	8
19	(Soviet Union) Iivo Nei	½	½	½	0	½	0	½	0	0	½	½	0	½	½	½	1	½	½	-	1	0	8
20	(Soviet Union) Yuri Nikolaevsky	½	0	0	½	½	1	0	0	0	½	½	0	½	1	1	0	½	1	0	-	0	7½
21	(Soviet Union) Vladimir Doroshkievich	0	0	1	0	0	½	0	0	½	0	0	½	0	½	½	0	½	½	1	1	-	6½
