= 1975 USSR Chess Championship =

Soviet chess tournament

43rd USSR Chess Championship
- Location: Yerevan

Champion
- Tigran Petrosian

The 1975 Soviet Chess Championship was the 43rd edition of USSR Chess Championship. Held from 28 November to 22 December 1975 in Yerevan. Former world champion Tigran Petrosian won his fourth title. The qualifying tournaments took place in Cheliabinsk and Kishinev.

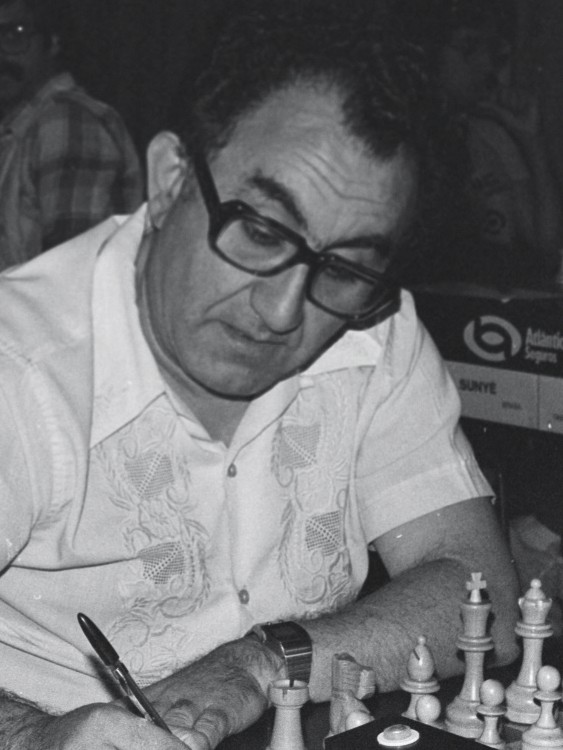
Tigran Petrosian

== Table and results ==
43rd USSR Chess Championship
	Player	Rating	1	2	3	4	5	6	7	8	9	10	11	12	13	14	15	16	Total
1	(Soviet Union) Tigran Petrosian	2645	-	0	1	½	1	½	½	½	½	1	½	½	1	½	1	1	10
2	(Soviet Union) Oleg Romanishin	2485	1	-	0	½	½	1	1	1	0	½	½	1	½	1	0	1	9½
3	(Soviet Union) Boris Gulko	2480	0	1	-	½	0	0	1	1	½	½	1	1	1	½	1	½	9½
4	(Soviet Union) Mikhail Tal	2645	½	½	½	-	½	½	½	½	0	1	1	½	½	1	1	1	9½
5	(Soviet Union) Rafael Vaganian	2530	0	½	1	½	-	0	0	½	1	1	1	½	1	½	1	1	9½
6	(Soviet Union) Lev Polugaevsky	2645	½	0	1	½	1	-	½	0	½	1	0	½	½	1	1	½	8½
7	(Soviet Union) Efim Geller	2600	½	0	0	½	1	½	-	1	½	½	½	1	½	1	½	½	8½
8	(Soviet Union) Yuri Balashov	2540	½	0	0	½	½	1	0	-	1	½	½	½	1	1	1	½	8½
9	(Soviet Union) David Bronstein	2590	½	1	½	1	0	½	½	0	-	1	½	½	0	0	½	1	7½
10	(Soviet Union) Alexander Beliavsky	2500	0	½	½	0	0	0	½	½	0	-	½	1	1	1	1	1	7½
11	(Soviet Union) Mark Dvoretsky	2495	½	½	0	0	0	1	½	½	½	½	-	½	0	½	½	1	6½
12	(Soviet Union) Lev Alburt	2420	½	0	0	½	½	½	0	½	½	0	½	-	1	½	½	½	6
13	(Soviet Union) Josif Dorfman	2380	0	½	0	½	0	½	½	0	1	0	1	0	-	1	0	½	5½
14	(Soviet Union) Semyon Furman	2560	½	0	½	0	½	0	0	0	1	0	½	½	0	-	½	1	5
15	(Soviet Union) Vladimir Doroshkievich	2425	0	1	0	0	0	0	½	0	½	0	½	½	1	½	-	0	4½
16	(Soviet Union) Janis Klovans	2500	0	0	½	0	0	½	½	½	0	0	0	½	½	0	1	-	4
