= 1970 USSR Chess Championship =

Soviet chess tournament

38th Soviet Chess Championship
- Location: Riga

Champion
- Victor Korchnoi

The 1970 Soviet Chess Championship was the 38th edition of USSR Chess Championship. Held from 25 November to 28 December 1970 in Riga. Viktor Korchnoi won his fourth title. The future world champion Anatoly Karpov had a quiet debut, beginning with a loss and 10 draws out of the first 11 rounds before beating Vladimir Bagirov in an Alekhine Defence in round 12. Mikhail Tal should have played in Riga, his home town, but he didn't. It looks as if the organizers doubted, on his recent illness history, whether he would last out the 21-rounder. It was a decision that was to rankle for years, especially since Tal was physically present, but had to confine himself to the press room.

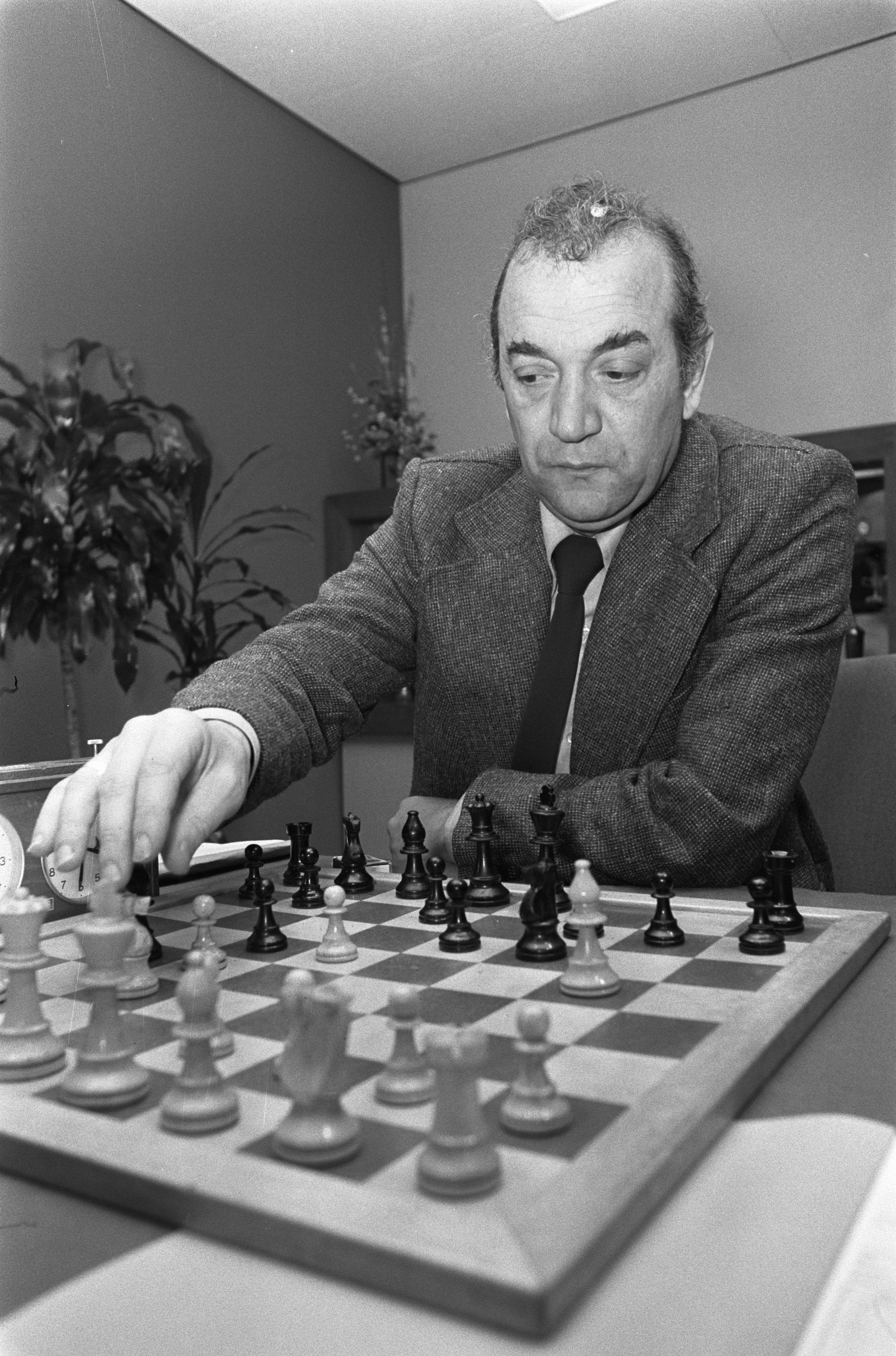
Viktor Korchnoi

== Table and results ==
38th Soviet Chess Championship
	Player	1	2	3	4	5	6	7	8	9	10	11	12	13	14	15	16	17	18	19	20	21	22	Total
1	(Soviet Union) Viktor Korchnoi	-	0	½	1	1	1	1	1	½	½	½	1	½	1	½	1	1	1	½	1	½	1	16
2	(Soviet Union) Vladimir Tukmakov	1	-	½	½	½	½	½	0	½	½	½	1	1	1	½	1	1	½	½	1	1	1	14½
3	(Soviet Union) Leonid Stein	½	½	-	½	½	½	½	½	1	½	1	1	½	1	½	½	1	1	1	0	½	1	14
4	(Soviet Union) Yuri Balashov	0	½	½	-	½	0	½	½	½	½	0	½	1	1	½	1	1	1	1	1	1	0	12½
5	(Soviet Union) Anatoly Karpov	0	½	½	½	-	½	½	½	½	0	1	½	½	1	½	1	1	1	½	½	½	½	12
6	(Soviet Union) Aivars Gipslis	0	½	½	1	½	-	½	½	½	½	½	½	½	1	½	1	½	½	0	1	½	1	12
7	(Soviet Union) Vladimir Savon	0	½	½	½	½	½	-	½	½	1	½	½	0	½	½	½	1	½	1	1	1	½	12
8	(Soviet Union) Mikhail Podgaets	0	1	½	½	½	½	½	-	½	½	½	0	1	1	½	½	½	½	½	½	0	1	11
9	(Soviet Union) Yuri Averbakh	½	½	0	½	½	½	½	½	-	0	½	½	0	1	½	½	½	1	½	1	1	½	11
10	(Soviet Union) Oleg Dementiev	½	½	½	½	1	½	0	½	1	-	0	½	1	½	0	0	0	½	1	1	½	½	10½
11	(Soviet Union) Vladimir Bagirov	½	½	0	1	0	½	½	½	½	1	-	½	1	0	½	1	0	0	0	1	1	½	10½
12	(Soviet Union) Vladimir Liberzon	0	0	0	½	½	½	½	1	½	½	½	-	½	0	1	0	½	1	1	½	1	½	10½
13	(Soviet Union) Ratmir Kholmov	½	0	½	0	½	½	1	0	1	0	0	½	-	½	½	½	½	½	½	½	1	1	10
14	(Soviet Union) Vladimir Doroshkievich	0	0	0	0	0	0	½	0	0	½	1	1	½	-	1	1	0	½	1	1	1	1	10
15	(Soviet Union) Vladimir Antoshin	½	½	½	½	½	½	½	½	½	1	½	0	½	0	-	0	½	0	1	½	½	½	9½
16	(Soviet Union) Igor Zaitsev	0	0	½	0	0	0	½	½	½	1	0	1	½	0	1	-	0	½	1	1	½	1	9½
17	(Soviet Union) Vladas Mikenas	0	0	0	0	0	½	0	½	½	1	1	½	½	1	½	1	-	0	1	0	0	1	9
18	(Soviet Union) Rafael Vaganian	0	½	0	0	0	½	½	½	0	½	1	0	½	½	1	½	1	-	0	½	½	1	9
19	(Soviet Union) Vladimir Karasev	½	½	0	0	½	1	0	½	½	0	1	0	½	0	0	0	0	1	-	½	1	1	8½
20	(Soviet Union) Igor Platonov	0	0	1	0	½	0	0	½	0	0	0	½	½	0	½	0	1	½	½	-	1	1	7½
21	(Soviet Union) Mark Tseitlin	½	0	½	0	½	½	0	1	0	½	0	0	0	0	½	½	1	½	0	0	-	0	6
22	(Soviet Union) Oleg Moiseev	0	0	0	1	½	0	½	0	½	½	½	½	0	0	½	0	0	0	0	0	1	-	5½
