= 1964 USSR Chess Championship =

Soviet chess tournament

32nd Soviet Chess Championship
- Location: Kiev

Champion
- Viktor Korchnoi

The 1964 Soviet Chess Championship was the 32nd edition of USSR Chess Championship. Held from 25 December 1964 to 27 January 1965 in Kiev. The tournament was won by Viktor Korchnoi. The final were preceded by semifinals events at Kishinev and Minsk.

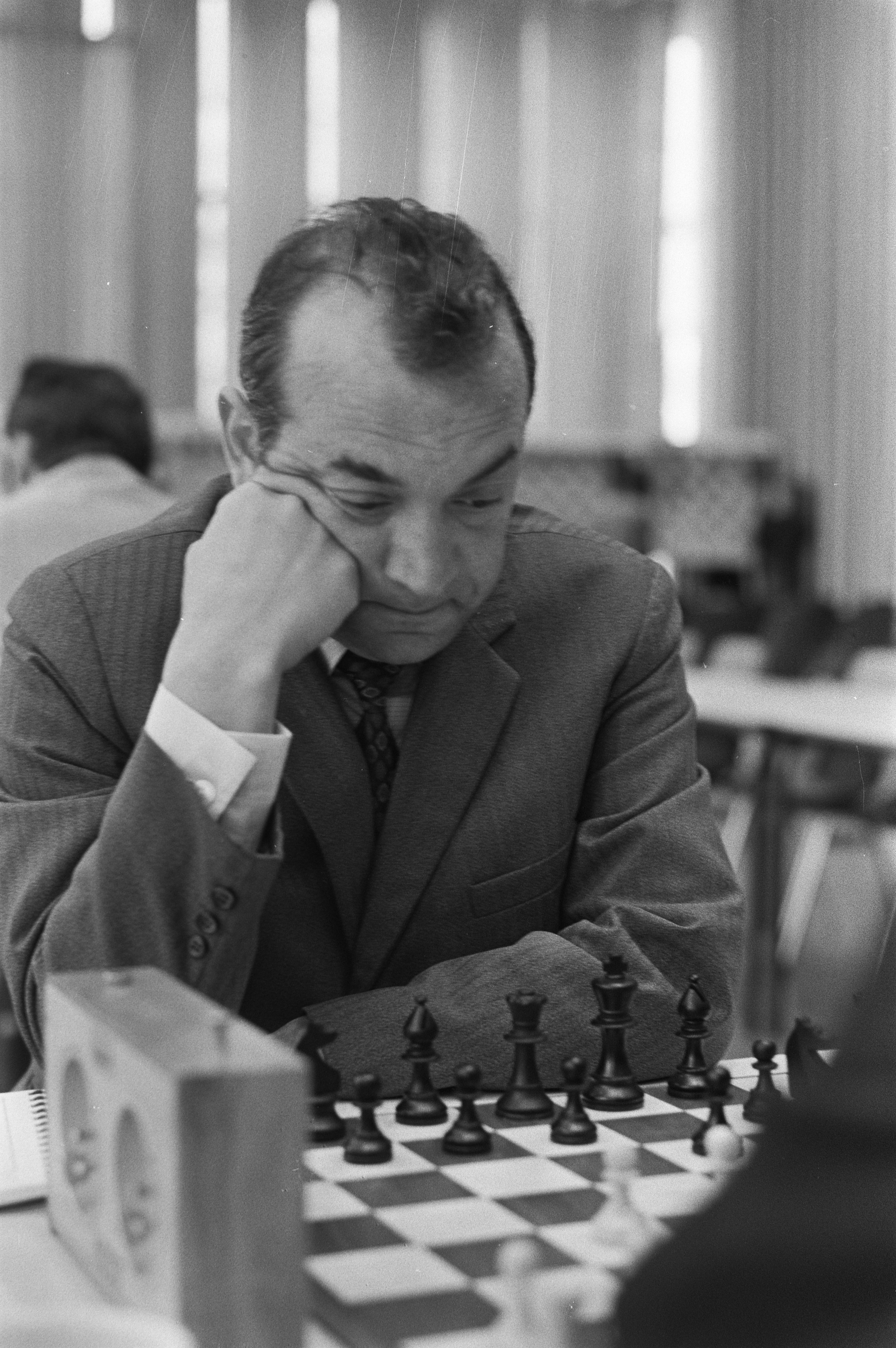
Viktor Korchnoi

== Table and results ==
32nd Soviet Chess Championship
	Player	1	2	3	4	5	6	7	8	9	10	11	12	13	14	15	16	17	18	19	20	Total
1	(Soviet Union) Viktor Korchnoi	-	1	1	½	1	1	1	½	1	1	½	½	½	1	½	1	1	1	½	½	15
2	(Soviet Union) David Bronstein	0	-	1	0	0	½	½	½	1	1	1	1	1	1	½	½	½	1	1	1	13
3	(Soviet Union) Mikhail Tal	0	0	-	½	½	1	½	1	0	1	1	½	1	1	½	½	1	½	1	1	12½
4	(Soviet Union) Leonid Stein	½	1	½	-	½	½	0	1	1	½	½	1	½	1	0	1	½	½	1	½	12
5	(Soviet Union) Ratmir Kholmov	0	1	½	½	-	½	1	½	½	½	½	½	½	½	½	1	1	1	½	½	11½
6	(Soviet Union) Leonid Shamkovich	0	½	0	½	½	-	1	½	½	½	½	1	0	1	1	½	1	1	1	½	11½
7	(Soviet Union) Anatoly Lein	0	½	½	1	0	0	-	½	½	½	½	½	1	1	1	½	½	½	1	1	11
8	(Soviet Union) Nikolai Krogius	½	½	0	0	½	½	½	-	½	½	½	1	½	½	½	1	½	1	½	1	10½
9	(Soviet Union) Anatoly Lutikov	0	0	1	0	½	½	½	½	-	½	1	1	½	½	½	½	½	1	½	1	10½
10	(Soviet Union) Yuri Averbakh	0	0	0	½	½	½	½	½	½	-	1	½	½	½	½	½	1	½	½	½	9
11	(Soviet Union) Viatcheslav Osnos	½	0	0	½	½	½	½	½	0	0	-	½	½	1	½	½	½	½	1	1	9
12	(Soviet Union) Georgy Borisenko	½	0	½	0	½	0	½	0	0	½	½	-	1	0	½	1	1	1	½	½	8½
13	(Soviet Union) Alexey Suetin	½	0	0	½	½	1	0	½	½	½	½	0	-	½	½	0	½	½	½	1	8
14	(Soviet Union) Evgeni Vasiukov	0	0	0	0	½	0	0	½	½	½	0	1	½	-	1	1	1	0	½	1	8
15	(Soviet Union) Anatoly Bannik	½	½	½	1	½	0	0	½	½	½	½	½	½	0	-	½	0	½	0	½	7½
16	(Soviet Union) Andrejs Petersons	0	½	½	0	0	½	½	0	½	½	½	0	1	0	½	-	½	½	1	½	7½
17	(Soviet Union) Yuri Sakharov	0	½	0	½	0	0	½	½	½	0	½	0	½	0	1	½	-	1	1	½	7½
18	(Soviet Union) Boris Goldenov	0	0	½	½	0	0	½	0	0	½	½	0	½	1	½	½	0	-	½	1	6½
19	(Soviet Union) Vladimir Liavdansky	½	0	0	0	½	0	0	½	½	½	0	½	½	½	1	0	0	½	-	0	5½
20	(Soviet Union) Nikolay Bakulin	½	0	0	½	½	½	0	0	0	½	0	½	0	0	½	½	½	0	1	-	5½
