= Arvid Kubbel =

Russian and Soviet chess player (1889–1938)

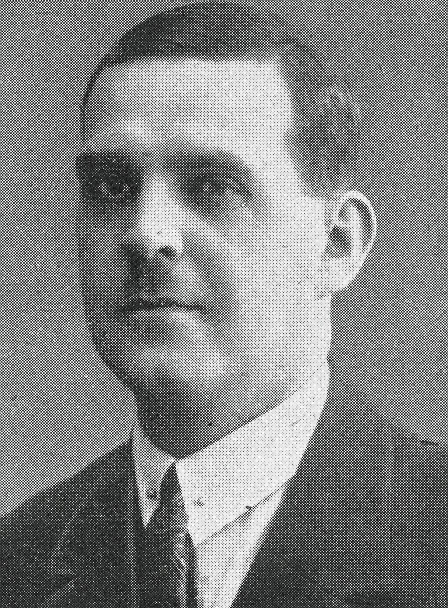

Personal information
- Native name: Арвид Куббель
- Born: Arvid Ivanovich Kubbel; 12 September 1889 Saint Petersburg, Russian Empire
- Died: 11 January 1938 (aged 48) Leningrad, Russian SFSR, Soviet Union

Chess career
- Country: Russian Empire; Soviet Union

Arvid Ivanovich Kubbel (Russian: Арвид Иванович Куббель; 12 September 1889 – 11 January 1938) was a Russian and Soviet chess player and composer of chess problems and endgame studies. He was a brother of Evgeny and Leonid Kubbel (one of the best-known chess composers); their father was born in Latvia, of Baltic German descent. He played in relatively few tournaments, but was among the stronger players of the early Soviet Union.

== Chess tournaments ==
In Moscow in 1920, he tied for fifth through seventh place at the first Soviet Chess Championship, won by Alexander Alekhine. At the second Soviet Championship in Petrograd 1923, he took sixth place behind Peter Romanovsky. He took fifth place at the Leningrad City Chess Championship in 1924 (won by Grigory Levenfish), tied for 11-13th at the fourth Soviet championship at Leningrad 1925 (won by Efim Bogoljubow), and tied for eighth and ninth place at the 1928 Leningrad City championship (won by Ilya Rabinovich).

== Arrest and execution ==
On 21 November 1937 he was arrested and charged under Article 58 1a (treason) of the RSFSR penal code. According to Huffington Post chess columnist Lubomir Kavalek, this was for sending his compositions to foreign newspapers. He was executed shortly afterwards.
