= USSR Chess Championship =

Chess competition in the Soviet Union

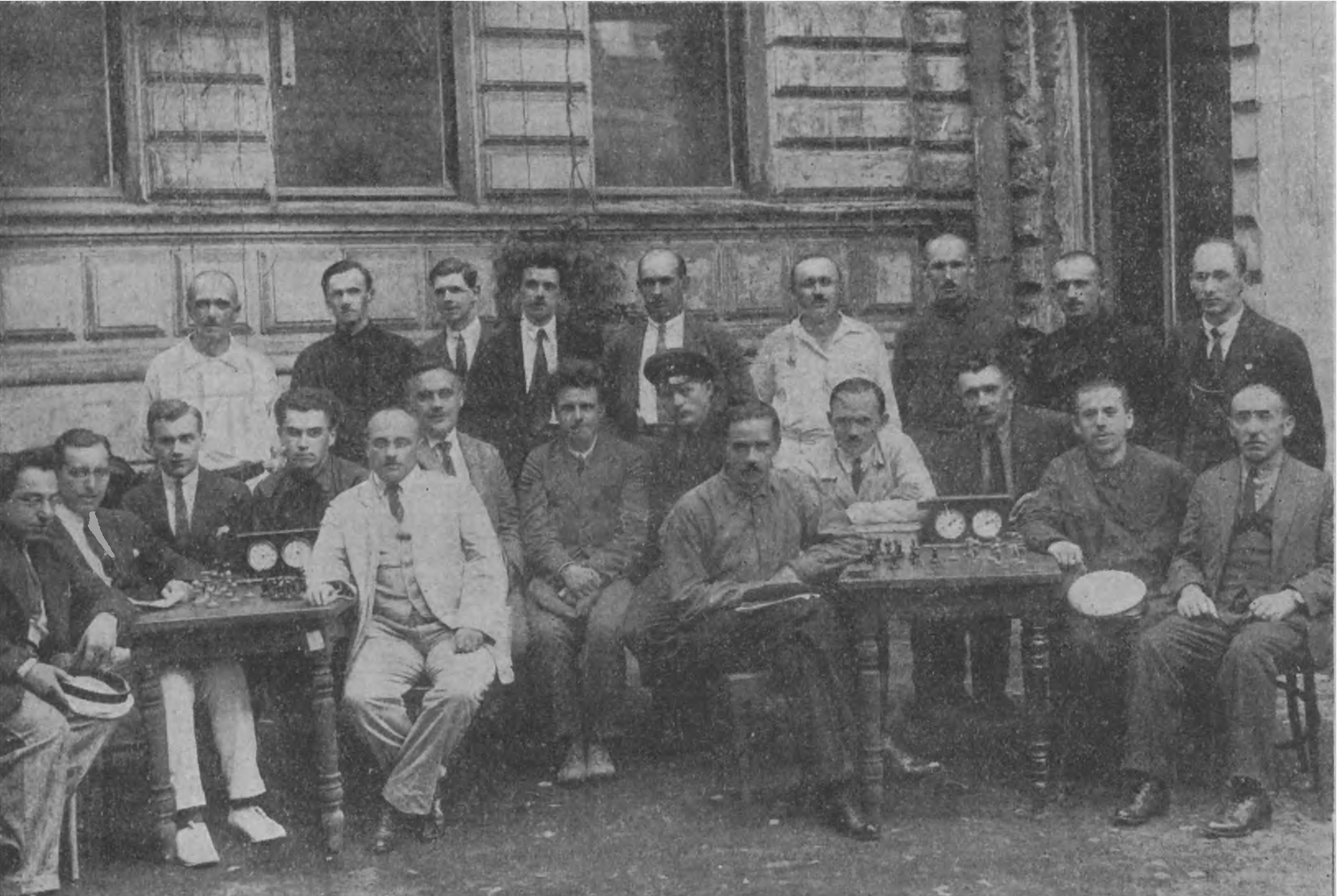
The participants of the fourth USSR Chess Championship in 1925. Sitting (left to right): Vilner, Levenfish, Rokhlin (organizer), Gotthilf, I. Rabinovich, Bogoljubow (winner), Ilyin-Genevsky, Duz-Khotimirsky, Romanovsky, Sergeyev, Nenarokov, Verlinsky, A. Rabinovich. Standing (left to right): von Freymann, Sozin, Eremeev (organizer), Grigoriev, Zubarev, Selezniev, Kaspersky, Kutuzov, Weinstein (organizer).

The USSR Chess Championship was played from 1920 to 1991. Organized by the USSR Chess Federation, it was the strongest national chess championship ever held, with eight world chess champions and four world championship finalists among its winners. It was held as a round-robin tournament with the exception of the 35th and 58th championships, which used the Swiss-system.

== Most wins ==
- Six titles: Mikhail Botvinnik, Mikhail Tal
- Four titles: Tigran Petrosian, Viktor Korchnoi, Alexander Beliavsky
- Three titles: Paul Keres, Leonid Stein, Anatoly Karpov

== List of winners ==
Edition	Date	Place	Winner	Score	Notes
1	4–24 Oct 1920	Moscow	Alexander Alekhine	12/15 (+9−0=6)	Known as the All-Russian Chess Olympiad at the time, this tournament was later recognized as the first USSR championship.
2	8–24 Jul 1923	Petrograd	Peter Romanovsky	10/12 (+9−1=2)	
3	23 Aug–15 Sep 1924	Moscow	Efim Bogoljubov	15/17 (+13−0=4)	
4	11 Aug–6 Sep 1925	Leningrad	Efim Bogoljubov	14/19 (+11−2=6)	
5	26 Sep–25 Oct 1927	Moscow	Fedor Bogatyrchuk; Peter Romanovsky	14½/20 (+10−1=9); 14½/20 (+12−3=5)	All of Bogatyrchuk's tournament results were erased from Soviet records after he emigrated to Canada and was declared a nonperson.
6	2–20 Sep 1929	Odessa	Boris Verlinsky	5½/8 (+4−1=3), 4/5 (+4−1=0), and 3½/4 (+3−0=1)	The tournament was conducted in three stages.
7	10 Oct–11 Nov 1931	Moscow	Mikhail Botvinnik	13½/17 (+12−2=3)	
8	16 Aug–9 Sep 1933	Leningrad	Mikhail Botvinnik	14/19 (+11−2=6)	
9	7 Dec 1934–2 Jan 1935	Leningrad	Grigory Levenfish; Ilya Rabinovich	12/19 (+8−3=8); 12/19 (+9−4=6)	
10	12 Apr–14 May 1937	Tbilisi	Grigory Levenfish	12½/19 (+9−3=7)	
11	15 Apr–16 May 1939	Leningrad	Mikhail Botvinnik	12½/17 (+8−0=9)	
12	5 Sep–3 Oct 1940	Moscow	Andor Lilienthal; Igor Bondarevsky	13½/19 (+8−0=11); 13½/19 (+10−2=7)	Mikhail Botvinnik won the Absolute Championship, 23 Mar–29 Apr 1941, Leningrad/Moscow, 13½/20 (+9−2=9)
13	21 May–17 Jun 1944	Moscow	Mikhail Botvinnik	12½/16 (+11−2=3)	
14	1 Jun–3 Jul 1945	Moscow	Mikhail Botvinnik	15/17 (+13−0=4)	
15	2 Feb–8 Mar 1947	Leningrad	Paul Keres	14/19 (+10−1=8)	
16	10 Nov–13 Dec 1948	Moscow	David Bronstein; Alexander Kotov	12/18 (+7−1=10); 12/18 (+10−4=4)	
17	16 Oct–20 Nov 1949	Moscow	Vasily Smyslov; David Bronstein	13/19 (+9−2=8); 13/19 (+8−1=10)	
18	10 Nov–12 Dec 1950	Moscow	Paul Keres	11½/17 (+8−2=7)	
19	11 Nov–14 Dec 1951	Moscow	Paul Keres	12/17 (+9−2=6)	
20	29 Nov–29 Dec 1952	Moscow	Mikhail Botvinnik	13½/19 (+9−1=9)	Botvinnik defeated Mark Taimanov in a playoff +2−1=3.
21	7 Jan–7 Feb 1954	Kiev	Yuri Averbakh	14½/19 (+10−0=9)	
22	11 Feb–15 Mar 1955	Moscow	Efim Geller	12/19 (+10−5=4)	Geller defeated Vasily Smyslov in a playoff +1=6.
23	10 Jan–15 Feb 1956	Leningrad	Mark Taimanov	11½/17 (+8−2=7)	Taimanov defeated Boris Spassky and Yuri Averbakh in a playoff.
24	20 Jan–22 Feb 1957	Moscow	Mikhail Tal	14/21 (+9−2=10)	
25	12 Jan–14 Feb 1958	Riga	Mikhail Tal	12½/18 (+10−3=5)	
26	9 Jan–11 Feb 1959	Tbilisi	Tigran Petrosian	13½/19 (+8−0=11)	
27	26 Jan–26 Feb 1960	Leningrad	Viktor Korchnoi	14/19 (+12−3=4)	
28	11 Jan–11 Feb 1961	Moscow	Tigran Petrosian	13½/19 (+9−1=9)	
29	16 Nov–12 Dec 1961	Baku	Boris Spassky	14½/20 (+10−1=9)	
30	21 Nov–20 Dec 1962	Yerevan	Viktor Korchnoi	14/19 (+10−1=8)	
31	23 Nov–27 Dec 1963	Leningrad	Leonid Stein	12/19 (+6−1=12)	Stein defeated Boris Spassky and Ratmir Kholmov in a playoff.
32	25 Dec 1964–27 Jan 1965	Kiev	Viktor Korchnoi	15/19 (+11−0=8)	
33	21 Nov–24 Dec 1965	Tallinn	Leonid Stein	14/19 (+10−1=8)	
34	28 Dec 1966 – 2 Feb 1967	Tbilisi	Leonid Stein	13/20 (+8−2=10)	
35	7–26 Dec 1967	Kharkiv	Lev Polugaevsky; Mikhail Tal	10/13; 10/13	The tournament was a 126-player Swiss.
36	30 Dec 1968–1 Feb 1969	Alma-Ata	Lev Polugaevsky; Alexander Zaitsev	12½/19 (+7−1=11); 12½/19 (+6=13)	Polugaevsky defeated Zaitsev in a playoff +2−1=3.
37	6 Sep–12 Oct 1969	Moscow	Tigran Petrosian	14/22 (+6−0=16)	Petrosian defeated Polugaevsky in a playoff held in Feb 1970 by +2=3.
38	25 Nov–28 Dec 1970	Riga	Viktor Korchnoi	16/21 (+12−1=8)	
39	15 Sep–17 Oct 1971	Leningrad	Vladimir Savon	15/21 (+9−0=12)	
40	16 Nov–19 Dec 1972	Baku	Mikhail Tal	15/21 (+9−0=12)	
41	1–27 Oct 1973	Moscow	Boris Spassky	11½/17 (+7−1=9)	
42	30 Nov–23 Dec 1974	Leningrad	Alexander Beliavsky; Mikhail Tal	9½/15 (+6−2=7); 9½/15 (+6−2=7)	
43	28 Nov–22 Dec 1975	Yerevan	Tigran Petrosian	10/15 (+6−1=8)	
44	26 Nov–24 Dec 1976	Moscow	Anatoly Karpov	12/17 (+8−1=8)	
45	28 Nov–22 Dec 1977	Leningrad	Boris Gulko; Iosif Dorfman	9½/15 (+4−0=11); 9½/15 (+4−0=11)	A playoff, held in 1978, was drawn +1−1=4.
46	1–28 Dec 1978	Tbilisi	Mikhail Tal; Vitaly Tseshkovsky	11/17 (+5−0=12); 11/17 (+6−1=10)	
47	29 Nov–27 Dec 1979	Minsk	Efim Geller	11½/17 (+6−0=11)	
48	25 Dec 1980–21 Jan 1981	Vilnius	Lev Psakhis; Alexander Beliavsky	10½/17 (+8−4=5); 10½/17 (+6−2=9)	
49	27 Nov–22 Dec 1981	Frunze	Garry Kasparov; Lev Psakhis	12½/17 (+10−2=5); 12½/17 (+9−1=7)	
50	2–28 Apr 1983	Moscow	Anatoly Karpov	9½/15 (+5−1=9)	
51	2–28 Apr 1984	Lviv	Andrei Sokolov	12½/17 (+8−0=9)	
52	22 Jan–19 Feb 1985	Riga	Viktor Gavrikov; Mikhail Gurevich; Alexander Chernin	11/19 (+4−1=14); 11/19 (+6−3=10); 11/19 (+5−2=12)	
53	4–28 Feb 1986	Kiev	Vitaly Tseshkovsky	11/17 (+6−1=10)	
54	4–29 Mar 1987	Minsk	Alexander Beliavsky	11/17 (+7−2=8)	Beliavsky defeated Valery Salov in a playoff +2=2.
55	25 Jul–19 Aug 1988	Moscow	Anatoly Karpov; Garry Kasparov	11½/17 (+6−0=11); 11½/17 (+6−0=11)	
56	22 Sep–16 Oct 1989	Odessa	Rafael Vaganian	9/15 (+5−2=8)	
57	18 Oct–3 Nov 1990	Leningrad	Alexander Beliavsky; Leonid Yudasin; Evgeny Bareev; Alexey Vyzmanavin	8½/13 (+5−1=7); 8½/13 (+4−0=9); 8½/13 (+6−2=5); 8½/13 (+5−1=7)	
58	1–13 Nov 1991	Moscow	Artashes Minasian	8½/11 (+7−1=3)	Minasian won this Swiss-style tournament on tiebreak over Elmar Magerramov.

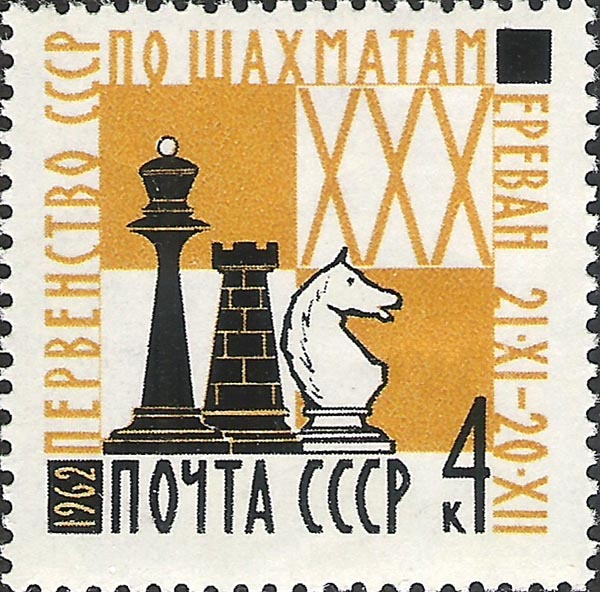
A Soviet stamp dedicated to the 1962 USSR Chess Championship

== See also ==
- Women's Soviet Chess Championship
- Russian Chess Championship

== Publications ==
- Mark Taimanov, Bernard Cafferty, Soviet Championships, London, Everyman Chess, 1998 (ISBN 978-1-85744-201-4)
