= Aleksandr Sergeyev (chess player) =

Russian chess player

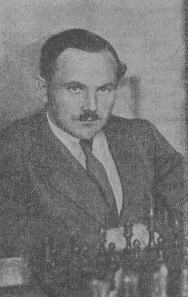
Aleksandr Sergeyev

Aleksandr Sergeyevich Sergeyev (Russian: Александр Сергеевич Сергеев; 28 August 1897, Serpukhov – 24 January 1970, Moscow) was a Russian chess master.

Originally an electrical engineer, he started competing in chess competitively by winning the Tournament of Cities championship in 1923, thus obtaining the provisional title of master. He won the Moscow City Chess Championship in 1925. In other editions of the same event, he tied for 3rd-5th in 1922/23 (Nikolai Grigoriev won), took 6th in 1924 (Grigoriev won), took 7th in 1926 (Abram Rabinovich won), tied for 5-6th in 1927 (Nikolai Zubarev, won), tied for 3rd-4th in 1928 (Boris Verlinsky won), took 17th in 1930 (Zubarev won), took 19th in 1933/34 (Nikolai Riumin won), and tied for 10-12th in 1935 (Riumin won).

Participating on three occasions at the USSR Chess Championship, he tied for 16-17th at Moscow 1924 (Efim Bogoljubow won), tied for 9-10th at Leningrad 1925 (Bogoljubow won), and took 13th at Moscow 1927 (Fedor Bogatyrchuk and Peter Romanovsky won).

He was married to fellow chess player and scientist Nina A. Bluket, who was one of the strongest female players in the Soviet Union during the 1920s.
