= Veniamin Sozin =

Veniamin Innokentevich Sozin (Russian: Вениамин Иннокентьевич Созин, 1896–1956) was a Soviet chess master, writer, and theoretician.

== Chess career ==
Sozin was an active player during the 1920s and 1930s, competing in four Soviet chess championships. Following the third Soviet Championship in 1924, in which he finished a creditable ninth with a score of 9/17, Sozin was awarded the title of Master of Sport; however, he was unable to maintain this level of performance, and was one of several players whose title was revoked in 1935.

Sozin was a noted chess theorist and writer, contributing many articles to the Moscow magazine Shakhmatny Vestnik and writing two books.

- Kombinatsii i Lovushki (Combinations and Traps), Leningrad 1929. English translation 1936 by Fred Reinfeld.
- Shto Kazhdy Dolzhen Znat ob Endshpile (What Everyone Should Know about the Endgame), Moscow 1931.

== Legacy ==
Among Sozin's contributions to opening theory, the Sicilian Sozin Attack and Semi-Slav Sozin Variation bear his name.

=== Sicilian, Sozin Attack ===
Sozin Attack

Position: a8 black rook, c8 black bishop, d8 black queen, e8 black king, f8 black bishop, h8 black rook, a7 black pawn, b7 black pawn, e7 black pawn, f7 black pawn, g7 black pawn, h7 black pawn, c6 black knight, d6 black pawn, f6 black knight, c4 white bishop, d4 white knight, e4 white pawn, c3 white knight, a2 white pawn, b2 white pawn, c2 white pawn, f2 white pawn, g2 white pawn, h2 white pawn, a1 white rook, c1 white bishop, d1 white queen, e1 white king, h1 white rook

1.e4 c5 2.Nf3 d6 3.d4 cxd4 4.Nxd4 Nf6 5.Nc3 Nc6 6.Bc4

The Sozin Attack (also known as the Sozin Variation or the Fischer–Sozin Attack) consists of the move 6.Bc4 against the Sicilian Defence, Classical Variation. Sozin was not the first to play this move – examples can be found dating back to the 19th century; however, he was one of the first to develop the plan of advancing the f-pawn to f5 to put pressure on Black's e6-square after the usual response 6...e6.

Sozin played this line during the 1930s, and it became popular from the 1950s, when it was frequently employed by Bobby Fischer. Fischer refined and advanced its theory, leading to the alternative name "Fischer–Sozin Attack". While the classic Sozin involves kingside castling, another important continuation called the Velimirovic Attack involves the setup 7.Be3, 8.Qe2, 9.0-0-0 with a view to initiating a sharp attack on Black's kingside.

A similar line may be played against the Sicilian Defence, Najdorf Variation, in which Black plays 5...a6 rather than 5...Nc6; in this case 6.Bc4 is sometimes referred to as the "Sozin–Najdorf". While this line may transpose into a classical Sozin Attack, Black has other options, for example he may choose to develop the queen's knight to d7. This line was also favoured by Fischer, who frequently followed it up with an immediate 7.Bb3.

=== Semi-Slav, Meran, Sozin Variation ===
Sozin Variation 11...Nxe5

Position: a8 black rook, c8 black bishop, d8 black queen, e8 black king, f8 black bishop, h8 black rook, f7 black pawn, g7 black pawn, h7 black pawn, a6 black pawn, e6 black pawn, f6 black knight, b5 white knight, e5 black knight, d4 black pawn, d3 white bishop, f3 white knight, a2 white pawn, b2 white pawn, f2 white pawn, g2 white pawn, h2 white pawn, a1 white rook, c1 white bishop, d1 white queen, e1 white king, h1 white rook

1.d4 d5 2.c4 e6 3.Nc3 Nf6 4.Nf3 c6 5.e3 Nbd7 6.Bd3 dxc4 7.Bxc4 b5 8.Bd3 a6 9.e4 c5 10.e5 cxd4 11.Nxb5 Nxe5

In 1925, Sozin published analysis of the move 11...Nxe5 (rather than the previously played 11...axb5) in the Semi-Slav Defense, Meran Variation (ECO D49) in the Queen's Gambit Declined. The move was introduced into play by Yakov Vilner, who defeated Efim Bogoljubow with it in the 1925 Soviet Championship. The move has since become standard. After 12.Nxe5 axb5, White has 13.Qf3 (Stahlberg), 13.0-0 (Rellstab), 13.Bxb5+, or 13.Qb3.
