= Nikolai Zubarev =

Russian chess player

Nikolai Zubarev (10 January 1894 – January 1951) was a Russian chess player. He won the championship of Moscow twice.

== Chess career ==
During World War I, Zubarev won ahead of Peter Yurdansky at Moscow 1915 and tied for 4–5th places the next year. After the war, he won the championship of Moscow in 1927 and 1930. He also took 5th place in 1919/20 (Alexander Alekhine won), took 3rd in 1920 (Josef Cukierman won), shared 6th in 1922/23 (Nikolai Grigoriev won), tied for 12–13th in 1925 (Aleksandr Sergeyev won), took 2nd behind Abram Rabinovich in 1926, tied for 5–6th in 1928 (Boris Verlinsky won), shared 6th in 1929 (Vasily Panov won), all in the Moscow Championship, and finished last in the 1925 Moscow international tournament, won by Efim Bogoljubov.

He participated several times in USSR Chess Championship; tied for 11–12th at Moscow 1920 (Alekhine won), took 10th at Petrograd 1923 (Peter Romanovsky won), tied for 11–13th at Leningrad 1925 (Bogoljubov won), took 4th at Odessa 1929 (quarter-final), and took 18th at Leningrad 1933 (Mikhail Botvinnik won).

Zubarev was awarded the International Arbiter title in 1951.
