= Vasily Panov =

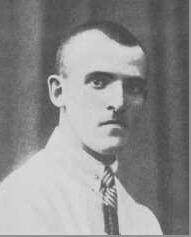
Vasily Panov

Vasily Nikolayevich Panov (Russian: Васи́лий Никола́евич Пано́в, November 1, 1906 – January 13, 1973) was a Soviet chess player, author, and journalist. Winner of the Moscow City Championship in 1929, he also played in five USSR Chess Championships from 1935 to 1948. His greatest tournament victory was Kiev, 1938. He was awarded the International Master title by FIDE in 1950. The website Chessmetrics.com, which assigns retroactive ratings to older players, ranks Panov as 21st in the world in 1948. This ranking was higher than that of many Grandmasters. In 1950s his chess results started to decline but his popularity as a chess writer kept on increasing. Panov is best known for his chess writings and theoretical work on the openings. He was chess correspondent for Izvestia from 1942 to 1965. His many books include a beginners' guide, biographies of Alekhine and Capablanca, and Kurs debyutov (1957), Russia's best-selling book on the chess openings. He has also written some non-chess poems, articles and plays.

== Contribution to openings ==
Panov contributed greatly to the theory of the Caro–Kann Defence and the Ruy Lopez. A variation of the Caro-Kann starting with the moves 1.e4 c6 2.d4 d5 3.exd5 cxd5 4.c4 is known as the Panov Attack (sometimes Panov–Botvinnik Attack). He is also credited with a sound variation of Alekhine's Defence for White, 1.e4 Nf6 2.e5 Nd5 3.d4 d6 4.Nf3 Bg4 5.h3, known as the Panov Variation.

== Books ==
- Comprehensive Chess Openings, by Yakov Estrin and Vasily Panov, in three volumes, Pergamon, 1980. ISBN 0-08-024113-1 (for set of three volumes in flexicover)
