= Yakov Vilner =

Ukrainian chess master

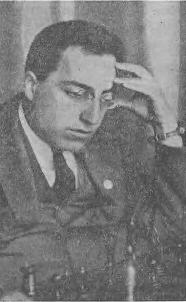
Yakov Vilner

Yakov Vilner (1899, Odesa – 29 June 1931, Leningrad) was a Ukrainian chess master.

== Biography ==
Vilner won the Odesa chess championships four times (1918, 1923, 1925, and 1928). He won the Ukrainian championships three times; at Kyiv 1924 (ahead of Fedor Bohatirchuk), at Kharkiv 1925 (ahead of Nikolai Sorokin), and at Odesa 1928 (with Vladimir Kirillov). He also won at Odesa 1926 (ahead of Russo), and at Kyiv 1929 (with Bohatirchuk).

He played in several Soviet chess championships. In July 1923, he tied for 11-13th in Petrograd (2nd URS-ch; Peter Romanovsky won). In September 1924, he tied for 6-8th in Moscow (3rd URS-ch; Efim Bogoljubow won). In 1925, he tied for 11-13th in Leningrad (4th URS-ch; Bogoljubow won). In October 1927, he tied for 15-17th in Moscow (5th URS-ch; Bohatirchuk and Romanovsky won). In September 1929, he tied for 8-9th in Odesa (6th URS-ch qual.; Boris Verlinsky won). Unfortunately, Vilner died young due to chronic asthma.

== Notable chess games ==
- Efim Bogoljubow vs Yakov Vilner, Leningrad 1925, 4th URS-ch, Semi-Slav Defense, Meran Variation, D49, 0-1
- Yakov Vilner vs Mikhail Botvinnik, Moscow 1927, 5th URS-ch, Amazon Attack, Siberian Attack, A45, 1-0
- Nikolai Sorokin vs Yakov Vilner, Odessa 1929, 6th URS-ch, Slav Defense, Schallopp Variation, D12, 0-1
