= 1986 USSR Chess Championship =

53rd edition of USSR Chess Championship

53rd USSR Chess Championship
- Location: Kiev

Champion
- Vitaly Tseshkovsky

The 1986 Soviet Chess Championship was the 53rd edition of USSR Chess Championship. Held from 2–28 April 1986 in Kiev. The title was won by Vitaly Tseshkovsky. Semifinals took place in Aktobe, Kostroma and Togliatti; two First League tournaments (also qualifying to the final) were held at Kharkov and Minsk.

== Qualifying ==
=== Semifinals ===
Semifinals took place at Aktobe, Kostroma and Togliatti in July 1985.

=== First League ===
Top three qualified for the final.

Kharkov, October 1985
	Player	Rating	1	2	3	4	5	6	7	8	9	10	11	12	13	14	15	16	17	18	Total
1	(Soviet Union) Evgeny Bareev	2310	-	½	1	½	1	0	½	½	½	1	½	1	0	1	0	½	1	1	10½
2	(Soviet Union) Sergey Dolmatov	2540	½	-	½	0	½	½	1	1	½	½	½	1	1	½	½	½	½	½	10
3	(Soviet Union) Smbat Lputian	2530	0	½	-	1	1	1	0	½	1	½	½	½	1	1	½	0	½	0	9½
4	(Soviet Union) Konstantin Lerner	2520	½	1	0	-	0	½	½	1	½	½	½	1	½	½	½	½	½	1	9½
5	(Soviet Union) Semen Dvoirys	2445	0	½	0	1	-	1	1	½	0	0	½	½	½	1	½	½	1	1	9½
6	(Soviet Union) Yuri Yakovich		1	½	0	½	0	-	½	½	½	½	½	½	½	1	0	1	½	1	9
7	(Soviet Union) Vereslav Eingorn	2525	½	0	1	½	0	½	-	½	½	½	0	1	1	½	½	½	½	1	9
8	(Soviet Union) Yury Dokhoian	2240	½	0	½	0	½	½	½	-	0	0	1	0	1	1	1	½	1	1	9
9	(Soviet Union) Evgeny Pigusov	2455	½	½	0	½	1	½	½	1	-	½	½	½	½	½	½	½	½	0	8½
10	(Soviet Union) Lev Psakhis	2555	0	½	½	½	1	½	½	1	½	-	1	½	0	½	½	1	0	0	8½
11	(Soviet Union) Eduardas Rozentalis		½	½	½	½	½	½	1	0	½	0	-	½	½	½	1	0	½	1	8½
12	(Soviet Union) Gennadi Zaichik		0	0	½	0	½	½	0	1	½	½	½	-	½	½	1	1	½	1	8½
13	(Soviet Union) Mikhail Podgaets	2450	1	0	0	½	½	½	0	0	½	1	½	½	-	½	1	½	½	½	8
14	(Soviet Union) Igor Novikov	2460	0	½	0	½	0	0	½	0	½	½	½	½	½	-	½	1	1	1	7½
15	(Soviet Union) Valery Chekhov	2495	1	½	½	½	½	1	½	0	½	½	0	0	0	½	-	½	½	0	7
16	(Soviet Union) Gennadi Kuzmin	2520	½	½	1	½	½	0	½	½	½	0	1	0	½	0	½	-	0	½	7
17	(Soviet Union) Elizbar Ubilava	2465	0	½	½	½	0	½	½	0	½	1	½	½	½	0	½	1	-	0	7
18	(Soviet Union) Bukhuti Gurgenidze	2445	0	½	1	0	0	0	0	0	1	1	0	0	½	0	1	½	1	-	6½

Minsk, October 1985
	Player	Rating	1	2	3	4	5	6	7	8	9	10	11	12	13	14	15	16	17	18	Total
1	(Soviet Union) Vladimir Malaniuk	2465	-	½	½	½	½	½	1	1	½	½	½	1	½	½	½	1	½	½	10½
2	(Soviet Union) Yuri Balashov	2495	½	-	½	½	1	½	1	½	½	½	½	½	½	1	½	½	½	½	10
3	(Soviet Union) Sergey Smagin	2405	½	½	-	½	½	½	½	½	1	0	1	½	1	½	½	½	1	½	10
4	(Soviet Union) Alexander Panchenko		½	½	½	-	½	½	1	½	½	½	1	½	½	½	½	½	½	½	9½
5	(Soviet Union) Leonid Yudasin	2475	½	0	½	½	-	1	½	½	1	1	½	½	½	½	½	0	½	1	9½
6	(Soviet Union) Vitaly Tseshkovsky	2505	½	½	½	½	0	-	½	½	1	½	½	½	½	½	1	½	1	½	9½
7	(Soviet Union) Alexander Khalifman	2485	0	0	½	0	½	½	-	½	1	½	½	½	½	1	1	1	½	1	9½
8	(Soviet Union) Nukhim Rashkovsky	2410	0	½	½	½	½	½	½	-	½	½	½	½	1	0	½	1	1	1	9½
9	(Soviet Union) Zurab Azmaiparashvili	2460	½	½	0	½	0	0	0	½	-	½	½	1	1	1	1	½	1	1	9½
10	(Soviet Union) Adrian Mikhalchishin	2505	½	½	1	½	0	½	½	½	½	-	0	1	½	½	½	½	1	½	9
11	(Soviet Union) Sergey Gorelov	2425	½	½	0	0	½	½	½	½	½	1	-	½	0	½	½	1	½	½	8
12	(Soviet Union) Ratmir Kholmov	2450	0	½	½	½	½	½	½	½	0	0	½	-	1	½	½	½	1	½	8
13	(Soviet Union) Boris Gulko	2475	½	½	0	½	½	½	½	0	0	½	1	0	-	1	½	½	½	1	8
14	(Soviet Union) Edvīns Ķeņģis	2430	½	0	½	½	½	½	0	1	0	½	½	½	0	-	½	½	1	1	8
15	(Soviet Union) Yuri Razuvaev	2520	½	½	½	½	½	0	0	½	0	½	½	½	½	½	-	1	½	1	8
16	(Soviet Union) Alexander Ivanov		0	½	½	½	1	½	0	0	½	½	0	½	½	½	0	-	0	½	6
17	(Soviet Union) Viktor Kupreichik	2470	½	½	0	½	½	0	½	0	0	0	½	0	½	0	½	1	-	1	6
18	(Soviet Union) Leonid Basin		½	½	½	½	0	½	0	0	0	½	½	½	0	0	0	½	0	-	4½

== Final ==
53rd USSR Chess Championship
	Player	Rating	1	2	3	4	5	6	7	8	9	10	11	12	13	14	15	16	17	18	Total
1	(Soviet Union) Vitaly Tseshkovsky	2455	-	½	½	1	½	½	1	½	½	½	½	1	½	0	1	½	1	1	11
2	(Soviet Union) Vladimir Malaniuk	2495	½	-	1	0	½	½	1	1	½	0	½	½	1	½	½	1	0	1	10
3	(Soviet Union) Vereslav Eingorn	2560	½	0	-	½	½	1	0	1	½	½	1	1	½	1	½	½	½	½	10
4	(Soviet Union) Konstantin Lerner	2530	0	1	½	-	½	½	½	½	1	½	½	½	1	½	1	½	1	0	10
5	(Soviet Union) Yuri Balashov	2515	½	½	½	½	-	1	½	½	0	½	½	½	½	1	½	1	1	½	10
6	(Soviet Union) Viktor Gavrikov	2550	½	½	0	½	0	-	1	½	1	1	½	½	1	½	0	1	½	1	10
7	(Soviet Union) Evgeny Bareev	2365	0	0	1	½	½	0	-	0	1	1	½	1	1	1	0	½	1	1	10
8	(Soviet Union) Nukhim Rashkovsky	2420	½	0	0	½	½	½	1	-	0	½	1	½	0	½	1	½	1	1	9
9	(Soviet Union) Leonid Yudasin	2485	½	½	½	0	1	0	0	1	-	½	½	½	1	½	0	½	1	½	8½
10	(Soviet Union) Mikhail Gurevich	2510	½	1	½	½	½	0	0	½	½	-	½	0	0	1	1	1	0	1	8½
11	(Soviet Union) Sergey Dolmatov	2515	½	½	0	½	½	½	½	0	½	½	-	½	½	1	½	½	½	½	8
12	(Soviet Union) Alexander Khalifman	2490	0	½	0	½	½	½	0	½	½	1	½	-	½	½	½	½	½	1	8
13	(Soviet Union) Smbat Lputian	2545	½	0	½	0	½	0	0	1	0	1	½	½	-	1	1	½	½	0	7½
14	(Soviet Union) Alexander Beliavsky	2625	1	½	0	½	0	½	0	½	½	0	0	½	0	-	½	1	1	1	7½
15	(Soviet Union) Zurab Azmaiparashvili	2465	0	½	½	0	½	1	1	0	1	0	½	½	0	½	-	½	½	0	7
16	(Soviet Union) Yuri Yakovich	2480	½	0	½	½	0	0	½	½	½	0	½	½	½	0	½	-	1	0	6
17	(Soviet Union) Sergey Smagin	2500	0	1	½	0	0	½	0	0	0	1	½	½	½	0	½	0	-	1	6
18	(Soviet Union) Semen Dvoirys	2470	0	0	½	1	½	0	0	0	½	0	½	0	1	0	1	1	0	-	6
