= 1987 USSR Chess Championship =

Soviet chess tournament

54th USSR Chess Championship
- Location: Minsk

Champion
- Alexander Beliavsky

The 1987 Soviet Chess Championship was the 54th edition of USSR Chess Championship. Held from 3–29 March 1987 in Minsk. The title was won by Alexander Beliavsky. Semifinals took place in Sevastopol and Pinsk; two First League tournaments (also qualifying to the final) was held at Kuibyshev and Irkutsk.

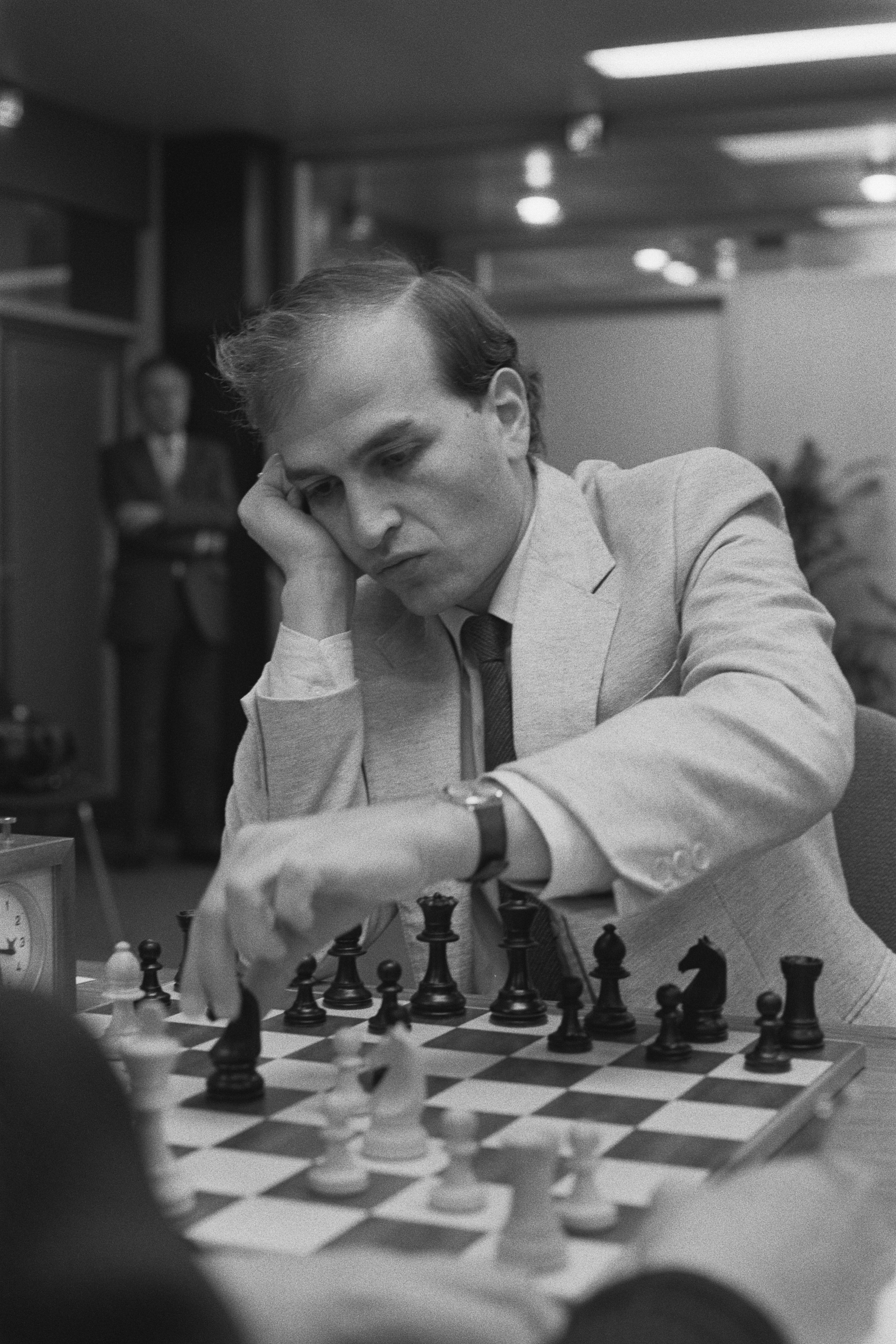
Alexander Beliavsky

== Qualifying ==
=== Semifinals ===
Semifinals took place at Sevastopol and Pinsk in August 1986.

=== First League ===
Top six qualified for the final.

Irkutsk, October-November 1986
	Player	Rating	1	2	3	4	5	6	7	8	9	10	11	12	13	14	15	16	17	18	Total
1	(Soviet Union) Smbat Lputian	2520	-	½	0	½	½	½	1	½	½	½	1	1	½	1	1	½	½	1	11
2	(Soviet Union) Valery Salov	2550	½	-	½	½	½	½	½	1	½	½	½	1	½	½	½	1	½	1	10½
3	(Soviet Union) Evgeny Bareev	2470	1	½	-	½	½	½	½	½	½	½	1	½	1	0	½	1	1	0	10
4	(Soviet Union) Lev Psakhis	2555	½	½	½	-	½	½	½	½	1	½	1	½	½	½	1	½	½	½	10
5	(Soviet Union) Viktor Gavrikov	2550	½	½	½	½	-	1	½	1	½	0	0	½	½	1	½	1	½	1	10
6	(Soviet Union) Sergey Dolmatov	2510	½	½	½	½	0	-	½	½	½	1	1	½	½	½	½	1	1	½	10
7	(Soviet Union) Evgeny Pigusov	2500	0	½	½	½	½	½	-	½	½	½	½	½	½	½	1	½	1	½	9
8	(Soviet Union) Konstantin Aseev	2440	½	0	½	½	0	½	½	-	0	½	1	1	1	½	½	1	0	1	9
9	(Soviet Union) Yuri Balashov	2530	½	½	½	0	½	½	½	1	-	½	0	½	½	½	0	½	1	½	8
10	(Soviet Union) Vassily Ivanchuk	2475	½	½	½	½	1	0	½	½	½	-	0	½	½	½	0	½	½	1	8
11	(Soviet Union) Yuri Kruppa	2445	0	½	0	0	1	0	½	0	1	1	-	½	½	½	1	1	0	½	8
12	(Soviet Union) Yury Dokhoian	2450	0	0	½	½	½	½	½	0	½	½	½	-	½	1	½	½	1	½	8
13	(Soviet Union) Gennadij Timoscenko	2475	½	½	0	½	½	½	½	0	½	½	½	½	-	½	½	1	0	½	7½
14	(Soviet Union) Yuri Razuvaev	2535	0	½	1	½	0	½	½	½	½	½	½	0	½	-	½	0	½	1	7½
15	(Soviet Union) Oleg Romanishin	2560	0	½	½	0	½	½	0	½	1	1	0	½	½	½	-	0	1	½	7½
16	(Soviet Union) Alexey Vyzmanavin	2480	½	0	0	½	0	0	½	0	½	½	0	½	0	1	1	-	1	1	7
17	(Soviet Union) Alexander Goldin	2390	½	½	0	½	½	0	0	1	0	½	1	0	1	½	0	0	-	½	6½
18	(Soviet Union) Grigory Serper	2200	0	0	1	½	0	½	½	0	½	0	½	½	½	0	½	0	½	-	5½

Kuibyshev, October-November 1986
	Player	Rating	1	2	3	4	5	6	7	8	9	10	11	12	13	14	15	16	17	18	Total
1	(Soviet Union) Vladimir Tukmakov	2575	-	0	½	1	½	½	½	½	1	½	1	½	½	1	1	½	1	1	11½
2	(Soviet Union) Alexander Khalifman	2500	1	-	½	½	½	½	½	½	½	1	½	1	½	1	½	1	½	½	11
3	(Soviet Union) Nukhim Rashkovsky	2445	½	½	-	½	0	1	½	½	½	1	0	1	1	1	½	½	½	1	10½
4	(Soviet Union) Jaan Ehlvest	2445	0	½	½	-	0	1	½	1	½	½	1	½	½	1	½	1	½	1	10½
5	(Soviet Union) Alexander Huzman	2390	½	½	1	1	-	½	0	½	½	½	½	½	½	½	½	1	½	1	10
6	(Soviet Union) Viktor Kupreichik	2490	½	½	0	0	½	-	1	½	½	0	1	0	1	1	½	1	1	1	10
7	(Soviet Union) Gregory Kaidanov	2415	½	½	½	½	1	0	-	½	½	0	½	½	1	½	1	½	1	½	9½
8	(Soviet Union) Yuri Yakovich	2440	½	½	½	0	½	½	½	-	0	½	½	½	½	1	½	1	1	1	9½
9	(Soviet Union) Alex Yermolinsky	2445	0	½	½	½	½	½	½	1	-	1	½	½	½	½	½	0	1	½	9
10	(Soviet Union) Zurab Azmaiparashvili	2470	½	0	0	½	½	1	1	½	0	-	½	½	½	½	½	½	½	1	8½
11	(Soviet Union) Evgeny Sveshnikov	2535	0	½	1	0	½	0	½	½	½	½	-	½	½	½	1	½	½	½	8
12	(Soviet Union) Adrian Mikhalchishin	2525	½	0	0	½	½	1	½	½	½	½	½	-	½	½	0	½	½	½	7½
13	(Soviet Union) Igor Novikov	2495	½	½	0	½	½	0	0	½	½	½	½	½	-	½	1	½	½	½	7½
14	(Soviet Union) Elizbar Ubilava	2515	0	0	0	0	½	0	½	0	½	½	½	½	½	-	1	½	1	½	6½
15	(Soviet Union) Lembit Oll	2430	0	½	½	½	½	½	0	½	½	½	0	1	0	0	-	½	½	0	6
16	(Soviet Union) Konstantin Lerner	2550	½	0	½	0	0	0	½	0	1	½	½	½	½	½	½	-	½	0	6
17	(Soviet Union) Leonid Yudasin	2495	0	½	½	½	½	0	0	0	0	½	½	½	½	0	½	½	-	1	6
18	(Soviet Union) Serikbay Temirbayev	2200	0	½	0	0	0	0	½	0	½	0	½	½	½	½	1	1	0	-	5½

== Final ==
54th USSR Chess Championship
	Player	Rating	1	2	3	4	5	6	7	8	9	10	11	12	13	14	15	16	17	18	Total
1	(Soviet Union) Alexander Beliavsky	2630	-	½	1	½	1	0	1	½	1	½	½	1	0	½	1	½	½	1	11
2	(Soviet Union) Valery Salov	2550	½	-	½	½	½	1	1	½	½	1	1	0	0	½	1	1	1	½	11
3	(Soviet Union) Vereslav Eingorn	2545	0	½	-	½	½	½	½	1	½	½	½	1	½	1	½	½	1	1	10½
4	(Soviet Union) Jaan Ehlvest	2445	½	½	½	-	0	0	0	1	½	1	1	1	½	½	1	1	½	1	10½
5	(Soviet Union) Alexander Chernin	2570	0	½	½	1	-	½	½	½	½	½	1	1	1	½	1	0	½	½	10
6	(Soviet Union) Artur Yusupov	2645	1	0	½	1	½	-	1	0	1	½	0	½	1	½	½	½	½	1	10
7	(Soviet Union) Sergey Dolmatov	2515	0	0	½	1	½	0	-	½	½	½	½	0	1	1	1	1	1	½	9½
8	(Soviet Union) Viktor Kupreichik	2475	½	½	0	0	½	1	½	-	0	1	1	0	½	1	0	½	1	1	9
9	(Soviet Union) Smbat Lputian	2500	0	½	½	½	½	0	½	1	-	0	½	1	1	½	½	1	½	½	9
10	(Soviet Union) Lev Psakhis	2575	½	0	½	0	½	½	½	0	1	-	½	1	½	½	1	½	½	1	9
11	(Soviet Union) Vladimir Tukmakov	2575	½	0	½	0	0	1	½	0	½	½	-	1	1	1	½	1	½	½	9
12	(Soviet Union) Evgeny Bareev	2535	0	1	0	0	0	½	1	1	0	0	0	-	1	1	½	1	½	½	8
13	(Soviet Union) Viktor Gavrikov	2550	1	1	½	½	0	0	0	½	0	½	0	0	-	½	½	½	½	½	6½
14	(Soviet Union) Nukhim Rashkovsky	2470	½	½	0	½	½	½	0	0	½	½	0	0	½	-	½	½	1	½	6½
15	(Soviet Union) Vladimir Malaniuk	2575	0	0	½	0	0	½	0	1	½	0	½	½	½	½	-	½	1	½	6½
16	(Soviet Union) Alexander Khalifman	2515	½	0	½	0	1	½	0	½	0	½	0	0	½	½	½	-	0	1	6
17	(Soviet Union) Mikhail Gurevich	2540	½	0	0	½	½	½	0	0	½	½	½	½	½	0	0	1	-	0	5½
18	(Soviet Union) Vitaly Tseshkovsky	2510	0	½	0	0	½	0	½	0	½	0	½	½	½	½	½	0	1	-	5½

=== Play-off ===
Vilnius, 29 April to 4 May 1987
	Player	Rating	1	2	3	4	Total
1	(Soviet Union) Alexander Beliavsky	2630	½	½	1	1	3
2	(Soviet Union) Valery Salov	2550	½	½	0	0	1
