= 1989 USSR Chess Championship =

Chess championship

56th USSR Chess Championship
- Location: Odesa

Champion
- Rafael Vaganian

The 1989 Soviet Chess Championship was the 56th edition of USSR Chess Championship. Held from 23 September 15 October 1989 in Odesa. The title was won by Rafael Vaganian. Semifinals took place at Barnaul, Blagoveshchensk and Uzhhorod; two First League tournaments (qualifying to the final) were held at Klaipėda and Simferopol.

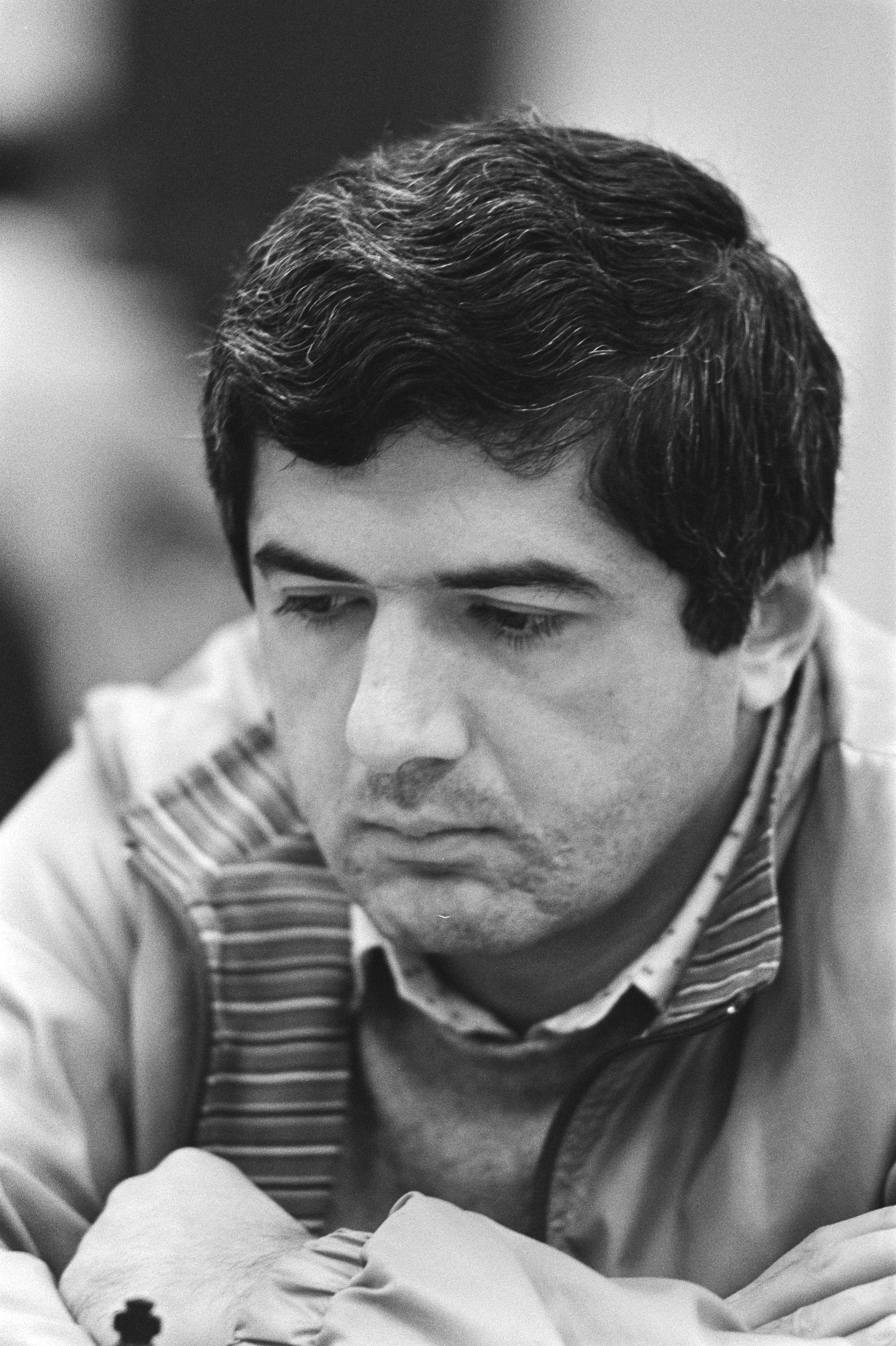
Rafael Vaganian

== Qualifying ==
=== Semifinals ===
Semifinals took place at Barnaul, Blagoveshchensk and Uzhhorod.

=== First League ===
Klaipėda, November 1988
	Player	Rating	1	2	3	4	5	6	7	8	9	10	11	12	13	14	15	16	17	Total
1	(Soviet Union) Sergey Dolmatov	2550	-	½	½	½	0	1	1	½	½	½	1	½	1	½	½	1	1	10½
2	(Soviet Union) Boris Gelfand	2585	½	-	½	½	½	½	0	½	½	1	1	1	½	1	1	1	½	10½
3	(Soviet Union) Lev Psakhis	2560	½	½	-	½	½	½	½	½	½	1	½	½	1	½	½	1	1	10
4	(Soviet Union) Yuri Balashov	2540	½	½	½	-	½	½	½	½	1	½	½	½	1	½	½	½	1	9½
5	(Soviet Union) Lembit Oll	2475	1	½	½	½	-	0	½	½	½	½	½	½	½	1	1	0	1	9
6	(Soviet Union) Ilia Smirin	2500	0	½	½	½	1	-	1	½	½	½	½	½	½	½	½	½	1	9
7	(Soviet Union) Konstantin Aseev	2445	0	1	½	½	½	0	-	1	0	½	½	½	½	½	1	1	1	9
8	(Soviet Union) Yury Dokhoian	2520	½	½	½	½	½	½	0	-	½	½	½	½	½	1	½	½	½	8
9	(Soviet Union) Eduardas Rozentalis	2490	½	½	½	0	½	½	1	½	-	½	½	½	1	0	½	½	0	7½
10	(Soviet Union) Adrian Mikhalchishin	2480	½	0	0	½	½	½	½	½	½	-	½	½	1	½	½	½	½	7½
11	(Soviet Union) Sergey Ionov	2360	0	0	½	½	½	½	½	½	½	½	-	½	½	½	½	½	1	7½
12	(Soviet Union) Ratmir Kholmov	2475	½	0	½	½	½	½	½	½	½	½	½	-	½	½	½	0	½	7
13	(Soviet Union) Alexei Shirov	2380	0	½	0	0	½	½	½	½	0	0	½	½	-	1	½	1	1	7
14	(Soviet Union) Alexander Goldin	2530	½	0	½	½	0	½	½	0	1	½	½	½	0	-	1	½	0	6½
15	(Soviet Union) Andrei Lukin	2430	½	0	½	½	0	½	0	½	½	½	½	½	½	0	-	½	1	6½
16	(Soviet Union) Elmar Magerramov	2430	0	0	0	½	1	½	0	½	½	½	½	1	0	½	½	-	½	6½
17	(Soviet Union) Aidyn Guseinov	2325	0	½	0	0	0	0	0	½	1	½	0	½	0	1	0	½	-	4½

Simferopol, November 1988
	Player	Rating	1	2	3	4	5	6	7	8	9	10	11	12	13	14	15	16	17	18	Total
1	(Soviet Union) Semen Dvoirys	2440	-	½	0	0	1	½	½	0	1	½	1	1	½	1	½	1	1	1	11
2	(Soviet Union) Vladimir Tukmakov	2590	½	-	½	½	½	½	1	0	½	1	½	½	½	1	1	½	½	1	10½
3	(Soviet Union) Vladimir Malaniuk	2520	1	½	-	½	½	1	½	1	1	½	½	½	½	½	½	½	½	½	10½
4	(Soviet Union) Konstantin Lerner	2530	1	½	½	-	½	0	½	1	1	½	½	½	½	½	½	0	1	1	10
5	(Soviet Union) Giorgi Giorgadze		0	½	½	½	-	1	0	½	½	½	½	½	½	1	1	½	1	1	10
6	(Soviet Union) Alexey Dreev	2495	½	½	0	1	0	-	½	½	1	½	½	½		1	1	1	½	½	9½
7	(Soviet Union) Mikhail Ulybin	2390	½	0	½	½	1	½	-	0	½	½	½	0	½	1	1	1	1	½	9½
8	(Soviet Union) Leonid Yudasin	2505	1	1	0	0	½	½	1	-	½	½	½	½	½	½	½	1	½	½	9½
9	(Soviet Union) Andrei Kovalev	2440	0	½	0	0	½	0	½	½	-	1	½	½	½	1	1	1	½	½	8½
10	(Soviet Union) Oleg Romanishin	2550	½	0	½	½	½	½	½	½	0	-	½	½	½	½	0	1	1	1	8½
11	(Soviet Union) Alexander Khalifman	2530	0	½	½	½	½	½	½	½	½	½	-	½	½	½	½	½	½	1	8½
12	(Soviet Union) Stanislav Savchenko	2480	0	½	½	½	½	½	1	½	½	½	½	-	½	0	½	½	½	½	8
13	(Soviet Union) Andrei Kharitonov	2550	½	½	½	½	½		½	½	½	½	½	½	-	½	½	½	½	½	8
14	(Soviet Union) Alex Yermolinsky	2460	0	0	½	½	0	0	0	½	0	½	½	1	½	-	½	1	½	1	7
15	(Soviet Union) Leonid Yurtaev	2485	½	0	½	½	0	0	0	½	0	1	½	½	½	½	-	½	1	½	7
16	(Soviet Union) Lasha Janjgava	2470	0	½	½	1	½	0	0	0	0	0	½	½	½	0	½	-	1	½	6
17	(Soviet Union) Smbat Lputian	2540	0	½	½	0	0	½	0	½	½	0	½	½	½	½	0	0	-	½	5
18	(Soviet Union) Leonid Basin	2350	0	0	½	0	0	½	½	½	½	0	0	½	½	0	½	½	½	-	5

== Final ==
56th USSR Chess Championship
	Player	Rating	1	2	3	4	5	6	7	8	9	10	11	12	13	14	15	16	Total
1	(Soviet Union) Rafael Vaganian	2585	-	0	0	½	½	½	1	½	1	½	½	½	1	1	½	1	9
2	(Soviet Union) Alexander Beliavsky	2620	1	-	½	0	1	1	½	½	1	½	0	1	0	½	0	1	8½
3	(Soviet Union) Boris Gelfand	2590	1	½	-	½	½	½	½	½	1	0	1	½	½	1	0	½	8½
4	(Soviet Union) Sergey Dolmatov	2615	½	1	½	-	½	1	½	0	1	0	½	0	1	0	1	1	8½
5	(Soviet Union) Vereslav Eingorn	2560	½	0	½	½	-	0	½	½	½	½	1	1	1	½	1	½	8½
6	(Soviet Union) Lembit Oll	2550	½	0	½	0	1	-	½	1	0	½	1	½	½	½	1	½	8
7	(Soviet Union) Konstantin Lerner	2530	0	½	½	½	½	½	-	1	½	1	0	½	½	½	½	1	8
8	(Soviet Union) Alexey Dreev	2570	½	½	½	1	½	0	0	-	½	½	½	½	1	½	½	½	7½
9	(Soviet Union) Konstantin Aseev	2485	0	0	0	0	½	1	½	½	-	½	½	½	½	1	1	1	7½
10	(Soviet Union) Andrei Sokolov	2595	½	½	1	1	½	½	0	½	½	-	½	0	½	½	½	0	7
11	(Soviet Union) Vladimir Tukmakov	2565	½	1	0	½	0	0	1	½	½	½	-	1	0	1	½	0	7
12	(Soviet Union) Giorgi Giorgadze	2470	½	0	½	1	0	½	½	½	½	1	0	-	½	1	0	½	7
13	(Soviet Union) Yuri Balashov	2535	0	1	½	0	0	½	½	0	½	½	1	½	-	½	½	½	6½
14	(Soviet Union) Semen Dvoirys	2520	0	½	0	1	½	½	½	½	0	½	0	0	½	-	1	1	6½
15	(Soviet Union) Vladimir Malaniuk	2560	½	1	1	0	0	0	½	½	0	½	½	1	½	0	-	0	6
16	(Soviet Union) Ilia Smirin	2530	0	0	½	0	½	½	0	½	0	1	1	½	½	0	1	-	6
