= 1983 USSR Chess Championship =

Soviet chess tournament

50th USSR Chess Championship
- Location: Moscow

Champion
- Anatoly Karpov

The 1983 Soviet Chess Championship was the 50th edition of USSR Chess Championship. Held from 2–28 April 1983 in Moscow. The title was won by Anatoly Karpov. Semifinals took place in Ivano-Frankivsk, Pavlodar, Sievierodonetsk and Yaroslavl; The First League (also qualifying to the final) was held at Telavi. There was no final in 1982, the year of the Soviet Zonal (Interzonal qualifying).

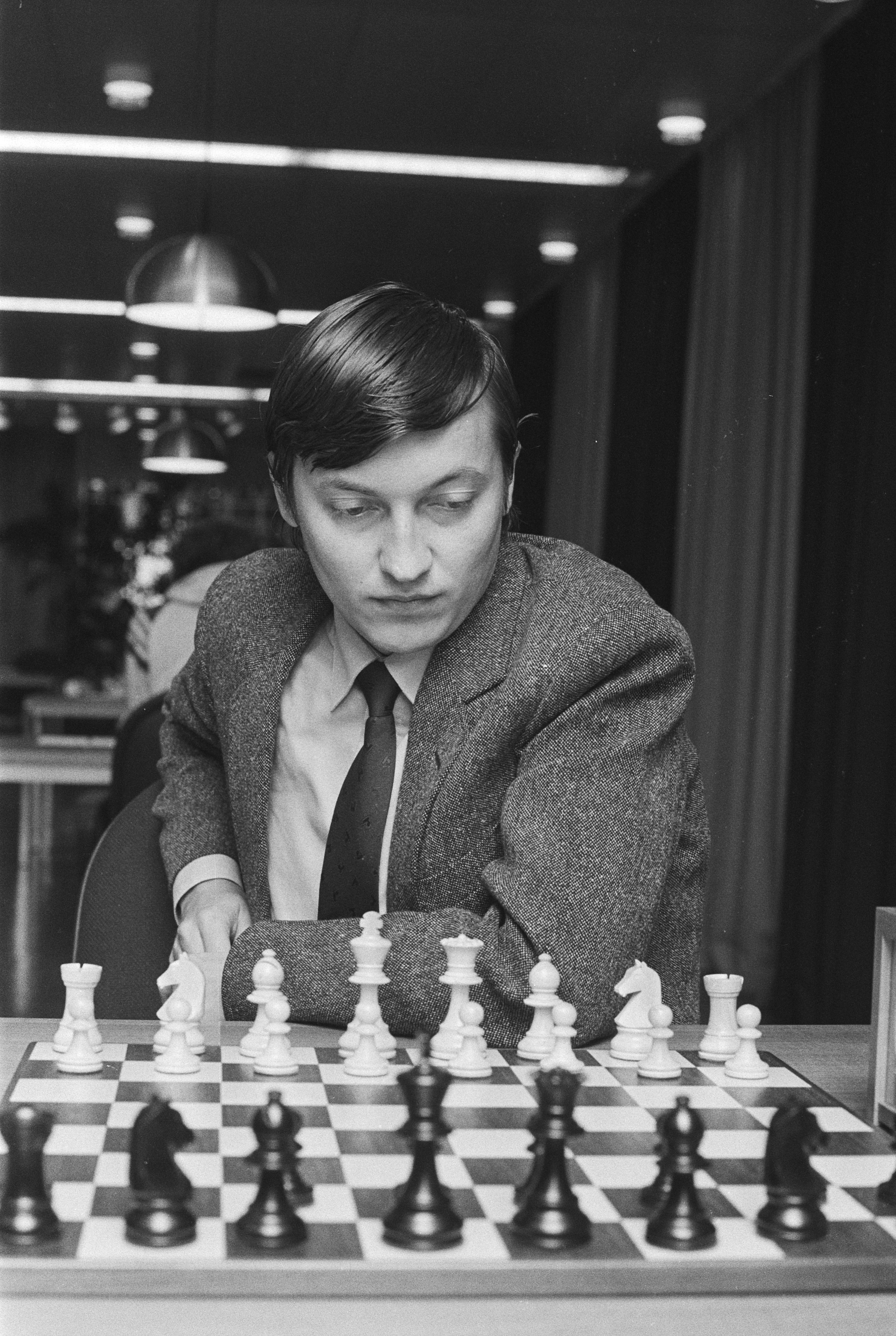
Anatoly Karpov

== Qualifying ==
=== Semifinals ===
Semifinals took place at Ivano-Frankivsk, Pavlodar, Sievierodonetsk and Yaroslavl in June–July 1982. The winners respectively were Konstantin Lerner, Zurab Azmaiparashvili, Vladimir Malaniuk and Yuri Razuvayev gaining a direct promotion to the final.

=== First League ===
The top two qualified for the final.

Telavi, December 1982
	Player	Rating	1	2	3	4	5	6	7	8	9	10	11	12	13	14	15	16	17	18	Total
1	(Soviet Union) Rafael Vaganian	2550	-	0	1	0	½	1	1	½	1	½	½	½	½	1	1	1	½	1	11½
2	(Soviet Union) Georgy Agzamov		1	-	½	½	½	1	0	1	1	½	0	½	½	1	1	½	½	1	11
3	(Soviet Union) Gennadi Zaichik		0	½	-	1	1	0	1	0	½	½	½	½	1	1	1	1	½	1	11
4	(Soviet Union) Valery Chekhov	2460	1	½	0	-	0	½	½	1	1	½	½	½	½	½	½	½	1	1	10
5	(Soviet Union) Smbat Lputian	2440	½	½	0	1	-	0	½	1	0	1	1	1	1	½	0	1	½	½	10
6	(Soviet Union) Leonid Yudasin	2405	0	0	1	½	1	-	½	½	½	0	½	1	1	0	½	1	1	1	10
7	(Soviet Union) Yuri Anikaev	2465	0	1	0	½	½	½	-	½	½	½	1	½	1	½	½	1	1	½	10
8	(Soviet Union) Elizbar Ubilava	2435	½	0	1	0	0	½	½	-	½	½	1	1	0	1	1	0	1	1	9½
9	(Soviet Union) Aleksandr Shneider		0	0	½	0	1	½	½	½	-	0	1	½	1	1	1	½	1	½	9½
10	(Soviet Union) Vladimir Bagirov	2495	½	½	½	½	0	1	½	½	1	-	1	0	½	0	½	½	0	0	7½
11	(Soviet Union) Vitaly Tseshkovsky	2595	½	1	½	½	0	½	0	0	0	0	-	1	0	½	½	1	1	½	7½
12	(Soviet Union) Andrei Lukin	2465	½	½	½	½	0	0	½	0	½	1	0	-	½	½	½	½	½	½	7
13	(Soviet Union) Evgeni Vasiukov	2495	½	½	0	½	0	0	0	1	0	½	1	½	-	0	0	½	1	1	7
14	(Soviet Union) Bukhuti Gurgenidze	2495	0	0	0	½	½	1	½	0	0	1	½	½	1	-	0	0	0	1	6½
15	(Soviet Union) Sergey Gorelov	2470	0	0	0	½	1	½	½	0	0	½	½	½	1	1	-	0	0	½	6½
16	(Soviet Union) Arshak Petrosian	2485	0	½	0	½	0	0	0	1	½	½	0	½	½	1	1	-	½	0	6½
17	(Soviet Union) Alex Yermolinsky	2450	½	½	½	0	½	0	0	0	0	1	0	½	0	1	1	½	-	½	6½
18	(Soviet Union) Michael Zeitlein	2490	0	0	0	0	½	0	½	0	½	1	½	½	0	0	½	1	½	-	5½

== Final ==
The final was held as late as April 1983 at Moscow with the unusual number of 17 players. Tal was soon ill and withdrew after round ten (after 2 loses, 3 draws and 4 adjourned games). The diagnosis this time was high blood pressure.

50th USSR Chess Championship
	Player	Rating	1	2	3	4	5	6	7	8	9	10	11	12	13	14	15	16	Total
1	(Soviet Union) Anatoly Karpov	2710	-	½	½	½	½	½	½	½	1	0	½	½	1	1	1	1	9½
2	(Soviet Union) Vladimir Tukmakov	2580	½	-	½	1	½	½	1	½	1	½	1	0	½	0	1	½	9
3	(Soviet Union) Lev Polugaevsky	2625	½	½	-	½	½	0	0	1	1	½	½	1	½	½	½	1	8½
4	(Soviet Union) Rafael Vaganian	2550	½	0	½	-	0	½	½	0	½	1	½	1	1	1	1	½	8½
5	(Soviet Union) Yuri Balashov	2540	½	½	½	1	-	½	0	½	0	0	½	1	½	1	1	½	8
6	(Soviet Union) Tigran Petrosian	2605	½	½	1	½	½	-	½	½	0	½	0	½	1	½	½	½	7½
7	(Soviet Union) Vladimir Malaniuk	2460	½	0	1	½	1	½	-	0	½	1	½	0	1	½	0	½	7½
8	(Soviet Union) Lev Psakhis	2580	½	½	0	1	½	½	1	-	0	½	½	0	½	½	½	1	7½
9	(Soviet Union) Oleg Romanishin	2585	0	0	0	½	1	1	½	1	-	½	0	1	½	½	0	1	7½
10	(Soviet Union) Zurab Azmaiparashvili		1	½	½	0	1	½	0	½	½	-	½	0	½	½	½	½	7
11	(Soviet Union) Yuri Razuvaev	2520	½	0	½	½	½	1	½	½	1	½	-	½	½	½	0	0	7
12	(Soviet Union) Georgy Agzamov		½	1	0	0	0	½	1	1	0	1	½	-	½	½	0	½	7
13	(Soviet Union) Alexander Beliavsky	2570	0	½	½	0	½	0	0	½	½	½	½	½	-	1	1	1	7
14	(Soviet Union) Efim Geller	2575	0	1	½	0	0	½	½	½	½	½	½	½	0	-	1	½	6½
15	(Soviet Union) Artur Yusupov	2565	0	0	½	0	0	½	1	½	1	½	1	1	0	0	-	½	6½
16	(Soviet Union) Konstantin Lerner	2525	0	½	0	½	½	½	½	0	0	½	1	½	0	½	½	-	5½
