= 1984 USSR Chess Championship =

Soviet chess tournament

51st USSR Chess Championship
- Location: Lviv

Champion
- Andrei Sokolov

The 1984 Soviet Chess Championship was the 51st edition of USSR Chess Championship. Held from 2–28 April 1984 in Lviv. The title was won by Andrei Sokolov. Semifinals took place in Volgodonsk, Irkutsk, Minsk, and Nikolayev. The First League (also qualifying to the final) was held at Tallinn.

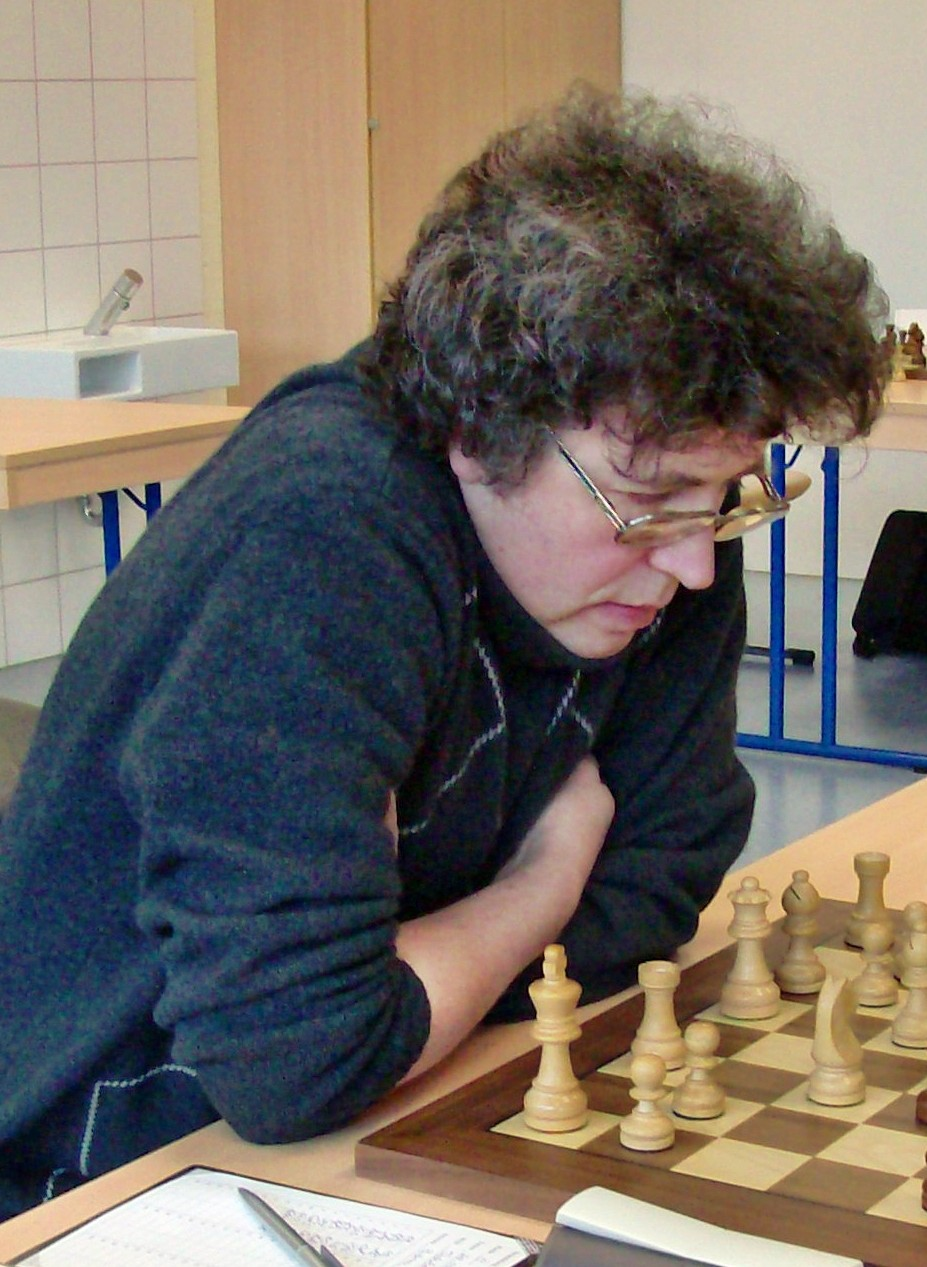
Andrei Sokolov in 2009

== Qualifying ==
=== Semifinals ===
Semifinals took place at (the first three gaining a direct promotion to the final): Volgodonsk (Novikov, Sveshnikov, Ehlvest); Irkutsk (Lputian, Chemin, Chekhov); Minsk (Belyavsky, Vyzhmanavin, Eingom); Nikolayev (Aseev, Mikhalchishin, A.Sokolov).

=== First League ===
The top five qualified for the final.

Tallinn, December 1983
	Player	Rating	1	2	3	4	5	6	7	8	9	10	11	12	13	14	15	16	17	18	Total
1	(Soviet Union) Josif Dorfman	2540	-	½	½	½	½	1	½	½	1	½	1	½	½	½	½	1	1	½	11
2	(Soviet Union) Lev Psakhis	2580	½	-	½	1	½	½	½	½	½	1	½	1	1	½	1	½	0	½	10½
3	(Soviet Union) Konstantin Lerner	2525	½	½	-	½	1	½	½	½	½	½	½	½	½	1	½	1	½	1	10½
4	(Soviet Union) Andrei Kharitonov		½	0	½	-	½	½	½	½	½	1	½	½	½	1	1	½	1	½	10
5	(Soviet Union) Boris Gulko	2490	½	½	0	½	-	1	½	½	½	½	½	1	0	½	1	½	1	1	10
6	(Soviet Union) Yuri Balashov	2540	0	½	½	½	0	-	½	½	½	½	½	1	1	½	1	1	1	0	9½
7	(Soviet Union) Vladimir Malaniuk	2460	½	½	½	½	½	½	-	1	½	½	½	½	1	½	½	½	0	½	9
8	(Soviet Union) Mikhail Podgaets	2450	½	½	½	½	½	½	0	-	1	½	½	1	½	½	½	½	½	½	9
9	(Soviet Union) Peter Korzubov	2450	0	½	½	½	½	½	½	0	-	1	½	½	½	½	½	½	1	1	9
10	(Soviet Union) Elizbar Ubilava	2445	½	0	½	0	½	½	½	½	0	-	½	½	1	½	1	½	1	1	9
11	(Soviet Union) Sergey Makarichev	2505	0	½	½	½	½	½	½	½	½	½	-	½	½	0	½	½	1	1	8½
12	(Soviet Union) Viktor Gavrikov	2470	½	0	½	½	0	0	½	0	½	½	½	-	1	1	½	½	1	1	8½
13	(Soviet Union) Leonid Yurtaev	2360	½	0	½	½	1	0	0	½	½	0	½	0	-	½	½	½	1	1	7½
14	(Soviet Union) Ratmir Kholmov	2480	½	½	0	0	½	½	½	½	½	½	1	0	½	-	½	½	0	½	7
15	(Soviet Union) Aidyn Guseinov	2200	½	0	½	0	0	0	½	½	½	0	½	½	½	½	-	½	1	1	7
16	(Soviet Union) Igor Polovodin	2435	0	½	0	½	½	0	½	½	½	½	½	½	½	½	½	-	0	½	6½
17	(Soviet Union) Alexander Petrushin	2415	0	1	½	0	0	0	1	½	0	0	0	0	0	1	0	1	-	1	6
18	(Soviet Union) Lembit Oll	2365	½	½	0	½	0	1	½	½	0	0	0	0	0	½	0	½	0	-	4½

Boris Gulko did not play the final for an unknown reason, and was replaced by Yuri Balashov.

== Final ==
51st USSR Chess Championship
	Player	Rating	1	2	3	4	5	6	7	8	9	10	11	12	13	14	15	16	17	18	Total
1	(Soviet Union) Andrei Sokolov	2495	-	½	½	1	½	1	1	1	1	½	1	½	½	½	½	1	½	1	12½
2	(Soviet Union) Konstantin Lerner	2485	½	-	½	½	½	½	0	1	1	1	1	½	½	½	1	1	½	1	11½
3	(Soviet Union) Vereslav Eingorn	2475	½	½	-	1	1	½	1	0	½	½	½	½	1	½	½	1	½	½	10½
4	(Soviet Union) Adrian Mikhalchishin	2480	0	½	0	-	1	½	½	½	½	½	½	1	½	1	1	½	½	½	9½
5	(Soviet Union) Smbat Lputian	2540	½	½	0	0	-	½	½	½	1	1	½	½	½	½	1	½	½	½	9
6	(Soviet Union) Igor Novikov	2420	0	½	½	½	½	-	1	½	1	½	½	½	0	½	1	0	½	1	9
7	(Soviet Union) Vladimir Tukmakov	2550	0	1	0	½	½	0	-	½	1	½	½	½	1	½	1	1	0	½	9
8	(Soviet Union) Alexander Beliavsky	2565	0	0	1	½	½	½	½	-	0	0	½	1	½	1	½	1	½	1	9
9	(Soviet Union) Alexey Vyzmanavin	2470	0	0	½	½	0	0	0	1	-	1	1	0	½	1	1	½	1	½	8½
10	(Soviet Union) Jaan Ehlvest	2485	½	0	½	½	0	½	½	1	0	-	½	0	1	1	0	1	½	½	8
11	(Soviet Union) Alexander Chernin	2475	0	0	½	½	½	½	½	½	0	½	-	½	½	½	1	½	½	1	8
12	(Soviet Union) Lev Psakhis	2535	½	½	½	0	½	½	½	0	1	1	½	-	½	½	0	0	½	½	7½
13	(Soviet Union) Josif Dorfman	2515	½	½	0	½	½	1	0	½	½	0	½	½	-	½	½	½	1	0	7½
14	(Soviet Union) Valery Salov		½	½	½	0	½	½	½	0	0	0	½	½	½	-	½	½	1	½	7
15	(Soviet Union) Konstantin Aseev	2390	½	0	½	0	0	0	0	½	0	1	0	1	½	½	-	½	1	1	7
16	(Soviet Union) Valery Chekhov	2535	0	0	0	½	½	1	0	0	½	0	½	1	½	½	½	-	1	½	7
17	(Soviet Union) Yuri Balashov	2535	½	½	½	½	½	½	1	½	0	½	½	½	0	0	0	0	-	½	6½
18	(Soviet Union) Andrei Kharitonov		0	0	½	½	½	0	½	0	½	½	0	½	1	½	0	½	½	-	6
