= 1985 USSR Chess Championship =

Soviet chess tournament

52nd USSR Chess Championship
- Location: Riga

Champion
- Mikhail Gurevich

The 1985 Soviet Chess Championship was the 52nd edition of USSR Chess Championship. Held from 22 January to 19 February 1985 in Lviv. The title was won by Mikhail Gurevich. Semifinals took place in Barnaul, Borjomi and Lviv; two First League tournaments (also qualifying to the final) was held at Sverdlovsk and Tashkent.

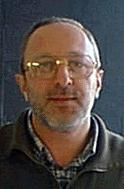
Mikhail Gurevich in 2000

== Qualifying ==
=== Semifinals ===
Semifinals took place at Barnaul, Borjomi, and Lviv in August 1984.

=== First League ===
Both top five qualified for the final.

Sverdlovsk, November 1984
	Player	Rating	1	2	3	4	5	6	7	8	9	10	11	12	13	14	15	16	Total
1	(Soviet Union) Viktor Gavrikov	2485	-	½	½	1	½	½	½	½	½	½	½	1	½	½	½	1	9
2	(Soviet Union) Viktor Kupreichik	2480	½	-	½	½	1	½	0	1	1	1	½	0	1	½	½	½	9
3	(Soviet Union) Lev Psakhis	2535	½	½	-	½	½	½	½	1	½	½	½	½	1	1	½	½	9
4	(Soviet Union) Mikhail Gurevich	2420	0	½	½	-	½	1	1	½	½	0	½	½	1	½	1	1	9
5	(Soviet Union) Alexander Chernin	2475	½	0	½	½	-	1	0	½	½	1	½	½	½	½	1	½	8
6	(Soviet Union) Bukhuti Gurgenidze	2470	½	½	½	0	0	-	½	½	½	½	1	1	1	½	½	½	8
7	(Soviet Union) Sergey Dolmatov	2525	½	1	½	0	1	½	-	½	1	½	½	½	0	½	½	0	7½
8	(Soviet Union) Andrei Kharitonov		½	0	0	½	½	½	½	-	1	½	½	½	0	½	1	1	7½
9	(Soviet Union) Anatoly Vaisser	2475	½	0	½	½	½	½	0	0	-	½	½	½	1	½	1	1	7½
10	(Soviet Union) Leonid Yudasin	2460	½	0	½	1	0	½	½	½	½	-	½	½	½	½	½	½	7
11	(Soviet Union) Mikhail Podgaets	2450	½	½	½	½	½	0	½	½	½	½	-	½	½	½	½	½	7
12	(Soviet Union) Sergey Gorelov	2445	0	1	½	½	½	0	½	½	½	½	½	-	½	½	½	½	7
13	(Soviet Union) Jaan Ehlvest	2485	½	0	0	0	½	0	1	1	0	½	½	½	-	1	0	1	6½
14	(Soviet Union) Ratmir Kholmov	2465	½	½	0	½	½	½	½	½	½	½	½	½	0	-	½	0	6
15	(Soviet Union) Nukhim Rashkovsky	2470	½	½	½	0	0	½	½	0	0	½	½	½	1	½	-	½	6
16	(Soviet Union) Eduardas Rozentalis		0	½	½	0	½	½	1	0	0	½	½	½	0	1	½	-	6

Tashkent, November 1984
	Player	Rating	1	2	3	4	5	6	7	8	9	10	11	12	13	14	15	16	Total
1	(Soviet Union) Georgy Agzamov	2590	-	0	½	1	½	½	½	1	½	½	½	½	½	½	1	1	9
2	(Soviet Union) Sergey Smagin	2355	1	-	½	0	½	½	1	½	0	½	½	½	½	1	1	1	9
3	(Soviet Union) Smbat Lputian	2540	½	½	-	½	0	½	½	½	1	1	½	½	1	½	½	1	9
4	(Soviet Union) Arshak Petrosian	2470	0	1	½	-	1	½	½	½	1	½	½	½	½	½	½	½	8½
5	(Soviet Union) Boris Gulko	2470	½	½	1	0	-	½	½	1	½	½	½	1	½	½	0	1	8½
6	(Soviet Union) Yuri Razuvaev	2500	½	½	½	½	½	-	½	½	½	½	½	½	½	1	½	1	8½
7	(Soviet Union) Elizbar Ubilava	2470	½	0	½	½	½	½	-	½	½	½	½	½	1	1	1	½	8½
8	(Soviet Union) Evgeny Sveshnikov	2515	0	½	½	½	0	½	½	-	1	½	1	½	1	½	1	½	8½
9	(Soviet Union) Tamaz Giorgadze	2495	½	1	0	0	½	½	½	0	-	½	½	½	½	1	1	½	7½
10	(Soviet Union) Josif Dorfman	2515	½	½	0	½	½	½	½	½	½	-	½	½	½	½	½	½	7
11	(Soviet Union) Vladimir Bagirov	2485	½	½	½	½	½	½	½	0	½	½	-	½	½	0	½	½	6½
12	(Soviet Union) Igor Novikov	2420	½	½	½	½	0	½	½	½	½	½	½	-	½	0	½	0	6
13	(Soviet Union) Konstantin Aseev	2390	½	½	0	½	½	½	0	0	½	½	½	½	-	1	0	½	6
14	(Soviet Union) Igor Glek	2395	½	0	½	½	½	0	0	½	0	½	1	1	0	-	½	½	6
15	(Soviet Union) Gennadi Kuzmin	2505	0	0	½	½	1	½	0	0	0	½	½	½	1	½	-	½	6
16	(Soviet Union) Alexey Vyzmanavin	2470	0	0	0	½	0	0	½	½	½	½	½	1	½	½	½	-	5½

== Final ==
52nd USSR Chess Championship
	Player	Rating	1	2	3	4	5	6	7	8	9	10	11	12	13	14	15	16	17	18	19	20	Total
1	(Soviet Union) Mikhail Gurevich	2435	-	½	½	½	½	½	1	½	0	1	1	½	1	1	½	½	½	0	1	0	11
2	(Soviet Union) Alexander Chernin	2495	½	-	½	1	0	½	½	½	1	½	½	½	0	½	½	½	½	1	1	1	11
3	(Soviet Union) Viktor Gavrikov	2550	½	½	-	½	1	½	½	½	½	½	½	1	1	½	½	½	1	½	0	½	11
4	(Soviet Union) Sergey Smagin	2405	½	0	½	-	½	½	0	½	1	½	0	½	½	1	1	½	1	½	1	½	10½
5	(Soviet Union) Andrei Sokolov	2550	½	1	0	½	-	½	1	1	½	1	½	½	0	½	½	½	½	½	½	½	10½
6	(Soviet Union) Yuri Balashov	2495	½	½	½	½	½	-	½	1	½	½	1	0	½	½	½	½	½	½	½	1	10½
7	(Soviet Union) Georgy Agzamov	2590	0	½	½	1	0	½	-	1	1	½	0	½	½	0	1	½	½	½	1	½	10
8	(Soviet Union) Lev Psakhis	2555	½	½	½	½	0	0	0	-	1	½	1	½	½	½	½	½	½	1	½	1	10
9	(Soviet Union) Konstantin Lerner	2520	1	0	½	0	½	½	0	0	-	1	½	½	½	½	1	½	0	1	½	1	9½
10	(Soviet Union) Evgeny Sveshnikov	2530	0	½	½	½	0	½	½	½	0	-	½	½	1	½	½	½	1	1	0	1	9½
11	(Soviet Union) Smbat Lputian	2530	0	½	½	1	½	0	1	0	½	½	-	½	½	0	½	½	1	½	1	½	9½
12	(Soviet Union) Vereslav Eingorn	2525	½	½	0	½	½	1	½	½	½	½	½	-	½	½	0	½	1	½	0	1	9½
13	(Soviet Union) Boris Gulko	2475	0	1	0	½	1	½	½	½	½	0	½	½	-	½	½	½	½	½	1	½	9½
14	(Soviet Union) Vladimir Tukmakov	2570	0	½	½	0	½	½	1	½	½	½	1	½	½	-	½	½	½	½	0	½	9
15	(Soviet Union) Adrian Mikhalchishin	2505	½	½	½	0	½	½	0	½	0	½	½	1	½	½	-	½	1	½	½	½	9
16	(Soviet Union) Yuri Razuvaev	2520	½	½	½	½	½	½	½	½	½	½	½	½	½	½	½	-	½	½	0	½	9
17	(Soviet Union) Efim Geller	2540	½	½	0	0	½	½	½	½	1	0	0	0	½	½	0	½	-	1	1	½	8
18	(Soviet Union) Arshak Petrosian	2510	1	0	½	½	½	½	½	0	0	0	½	½	½	½	½	½	0	-	1	½	8
19	(Soviet Union) Viktor Kupreichik	2470	0	0	1	0	½	½	0	½	½	1	0	1	0	1	½	1	0	0	-	0	7½
20	(Soviet Union) Bukhuti Gurgenidze	2445	1	0	½	½	½	0	½	0	0	0	½	0	½	½	½	½	½	½	1	-	7½

=== Play-off ===
First place was shared by Gavrikov, Gurevich and Chernin. The play-off saw all games end in draws. While the chess officials were pondering what to do next, a journalist announced that there would be no further play and Gurevich would be winner on tie-break from the final contest, what was accepted. So Mikhail Gurevich received the gold medal. Mark Taimanov notes that superior tie-break in the final had never been taken into account before.

Vilnius, December 1985
	Player	Rating	1	2	3	Total
1	(Soviet Union) Alexander Chernin	2560	--	½½	½½	2
2	(Soviet Union) Viktor Gavrikov	2550	½½	--	½½	2
3	(Soviet Union) Mikhail Gurevich	2435	½½	½½	--	2
