= 1988 USSR Chess Championship =

Soviet chess tournament

55th USSR Chess Championship
- Location: Moscow

Champion
- Garry Kasparov; Anatoly Karpov

The 1988 Soviet Chess Championship was the 55th edition of USSR Chess Championship. Held from 25 July 19 August 1988 in Moscow. The title was shared by the world champion Garry Kasparov and former world champion Anatoly Karpov. Semifinals took place at Norilsk and Pavlodar; two First League tournaments (qualifying to the final) were held at Lvov and Sverdlovsk.

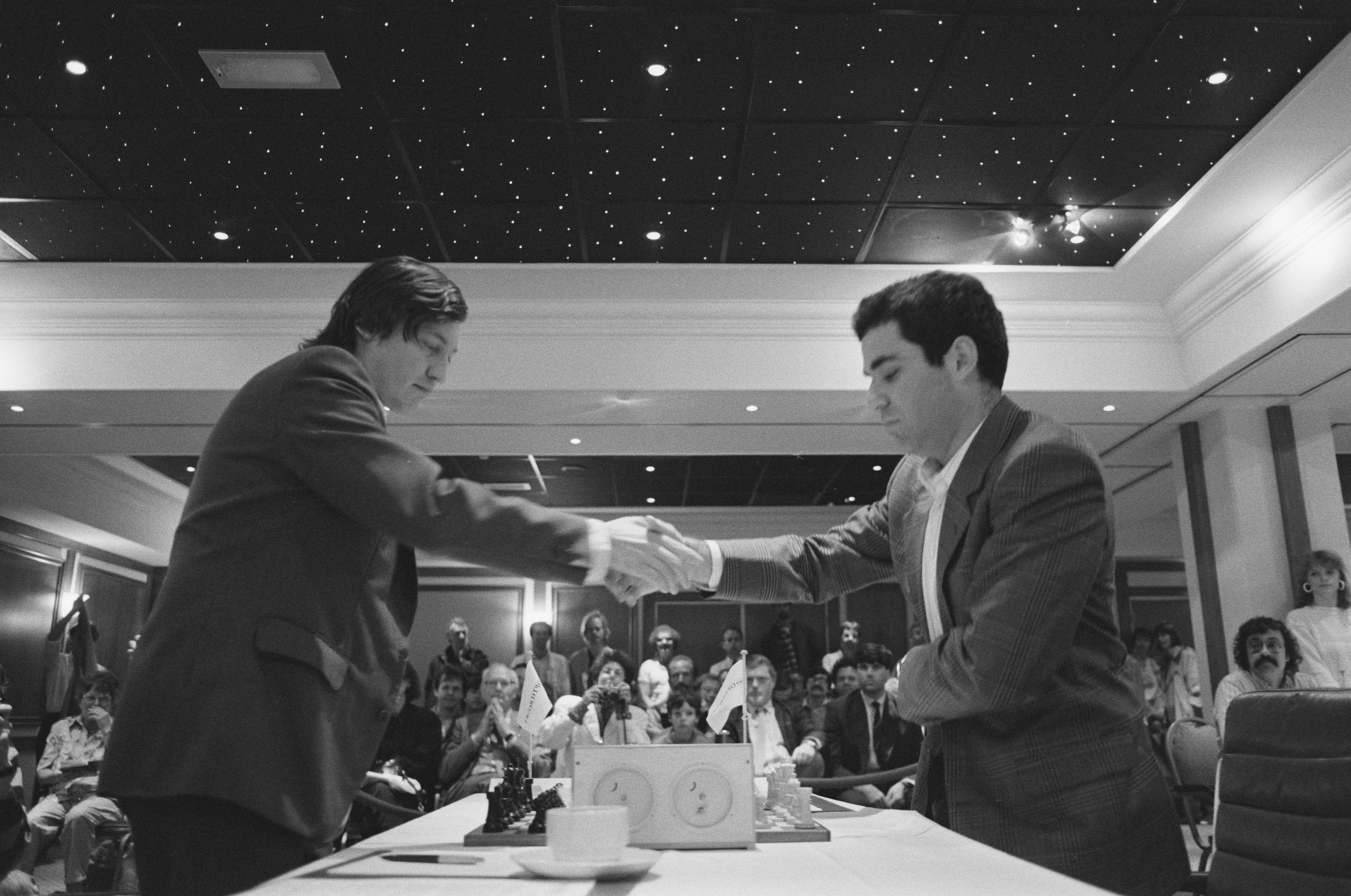
Karpov and Kasparov in 1988

== Qualifying ==
=== Semifinals ===
Semifinals, consisted of two Swiss tournaments, took place at Norilsk and Pavlodar in August 1987, from which eight each went on to the First League.

=== First League ===
Top four qualified for the final.

Lvov, November 1987
	Player	Rating	1	2	3	4	5	6	7	8	9	10	11	12	13	14	15	16	17	18	Total
1	(Soviet Union) Vassily Ivanchuk	2480	-	½	½	½	½	1	½	½	½	½	1	1	1	½	½	½	1	1	11½
2	(Soviet Union) Leonid Yudasin	2480	½	-	½	½	1	½	1	1	0	½	1	1	1	½	0	½	1	½	11
3	(Soviet Union) Viktor Gavrikov	2525	½	½	-	½	½	1	½	½	½	1	1	1	½	0	½	½	½	½	10
4	(Soviet Union) Mikhail Gurevich	2515	½	½	½	-	½	½	½	1	1	½	½	½	1	½	½	½	½	½	10
5	(Soviet Union) Alexander Chernin	2580	½	0	½	½	-	0	1	½	½	1	½	½	1	½	1	½	1	½	10
6	(Soviet Union) Igor Novikov	2455	0	½	0	½	1	-	½	½	½	½	1	0	½	1	1	½	½	½	9
7	(Soviet Union) Lasha Janjgava	2410	½	0	½	½	0	½	-	½	½	½	1	½	0	1	½	1	½	½	8½
8	(Soviet Union) Evgeny Bareev	2555	½	0	½	0	½	½	½	-	½	0	½	1	0	½	1	½	1	1	8½
9	(Soviet Union) Vidmantas Malisauskas	2325	½	1	½	0	½	½	½	½	-	½	½	½	0	½	½	½	0	1	8
10	(Soviet Union) Alexey Vyzmanavin	2480	½	½	0	½	0	½	½	1	½	-	0	½	1	0	½	1	0	1	8
11	(Soviet Union) Alexey Dreev	2475	0	0	0	½	½	0	0	½	½	1	-	1	1	1	1	½	0	½	8
12	(Soviet Union) Oleg Romanishin	2555	0	0	0	½	½	1	½	0	½	½	0	-	1	½	½	1	1	½	8
13	(Soviet Union) Gregory Kaidanov	2475	0	0	½	0	0	½	1	1	1	0	0	0	-	1	½	1	1	½	8
14	(Soviet Union) Eduardas Rozentalis	2505	½	½	1	½	½	0	0	½	½	1	0	½	0	-	1	0	1	0	7½
15	(Soviet Union) Adrian Mikhalchishin	2500	½	1	½	½	0	0	½	0	½	½	0	½	½	0	-	½	1	1	7½
16	(Soviet Union) Alexander Panchenko	2475	½	½	½	½	½	½	0	½	½	0	½	0	0	1	½	-	0	1	7
17	(Soviet Union) Gennadi Zaichik	2490	0	0	½	½	0	½	½	0	1	1	1	0	0	0	0	1	-	½	6½
18	(Soviet Union) Smbat Lputian	2540	0	½	½	½	½	½	½	0	0	0	½	½	½	1	0	0	½	-	6

Sverdlovsk, November 1987
	Player	Rating	1	2	3	4	5	6	7	8	9	10	11	12	13	14	15	16	17	18	Total
1	(Soviet Union) Ilia Smirin	2480	-	½	½	½	1	0	1	½	1	½	½	½	1	1	½	1	0	1	11
2	(Soviet Union) Alexander Khalifman	2515	½	-	½	½	½	1	½	½	½	1	½	½	½	1	1	½	½	½	10½
3	(Soviet Union) Vladimir Malaniuk	2545	½	½	-	½	1	½	½	0	½	½	½	1	1	½	½	½	1	½	10
4	(Soviet Union) Andrei Kharitonov	2450	½	½	½	-	½	½	½	½	½	½	½	1	½	½	1	½	1	1	10
5	(Soviet Union) Boris Gelfand	2510	0	½	0	½	-	½	½	½	½	½	½	½	½	1	1	1	1	1	10
6	(Soviet Union) Vitaly Tseshkovsky	2485	1	0	½	½	½	-	½	½	½	½	½	1	½	½	1	½	1	½	10
7	(Soviet Union) Yury Dokhoian	2525	0	½	½	½	½	½	-	½	½	½	0	1	½	½	½	1	1	1	9½
8	(Soviet Union) Vladimir Tukmakov	2580	½	½	1	½	½	½	½	-	½	½	1	½	½	0	½	½	1	0	9
9	(Soviet Union) Lev Psakhis	2575	0	½	½	½	½	½	½	½	-	½	½	½	½	½	½	½	1	1	9
10	(Soviet Union) Evgeny Pigusov	2520	½	0	½	½	½	½	½	½	½	-	½	½	½	½	½	½	1	1	9
11	(Soviet Union) Nukhim Rashkovsky	2495	½	½	½	½	½	½	1	0	½	½	-	½	½	½	½	½	0	1	8½
12	(Soviet Union) Lembit Oll	2465	½	½	0	0	½	0	0	½	½	½	½	-	1	1	½	1	1	½	7½
13	(Soviet Union) Alex Yermolinsky	2445	0	½	0	½	½	½	½	½	½	½	½	0	-	½	½	½	½	1	7
14	(Soviet Union) Yuri Balashov	2550	0	0	½	½	0	½	½	1	½	½	½	0	½	-	½	0	½	½	6½
15	(Soviet Union) Gennadij Timoscenko	2490	½	0	½	0	0	0	½	½	½	½	½	½	½	½	-	½	½	½	6½
16	(Soviet Union) Alexander Huzman	2500	0	½	½	½	0	½	0	½	½	½	½	0	½	1	½	-	0	½	6½
17	(Soviet Union) Viktor Kupreichik	2500	1	½	0	0	0	0	0	0	0	0	1	0	½	½	½	1	-	½	5½
18	(Soviet Union) Valery Loginov	2355	0	½	½	0	0	½	0	1	0	0	0	½	0	½	½	½	½	-	5

== Final ==
Mikhail Tal withdrew after one round (draw against Rafael Vaganian) due to illness and was replaced by Vereslav Eingorn. A play-off between the first two was planned, but it ended up not taking place, with the Soviet Federation declaring Kasparov and Karpov winners of the gold medal.

55th USSR Chess Championship
	Player	Rating	1	2	3	4	5	6	7	8	9	10	11	12	13	14	15	16	17	18	Total
1	(Soviet Union) Garry Kasparov	2760	-	½	½	1	½	1	1	½	½	½	½	½	½	½	1	1	½	1	11½
2	(Soviet Union) Anatoly Karpov	2725	½	-	1	½	½	½	½	½	½	½	1	½	½	½	1	1	1	1	11½
3	(Soviet Union) Artur Yusupov	2620	½	0	-	1	½	0	½	½	½	1	½	1	½	½	½	1	½	1	10
4	(Soviet Union) Valery Salov	2625	0	½	0	-	½	½	0	1	½	1	½	½	1	1	½	1	1	½	10
5	(Soviet Union) Vereslav Eingorn	2560	½	½	½	½	-	½	½	1	½	0	½	½	1	½	½	½	1	½	9½
6	(Soviet Union) Vassily Ivanchuk	2625	0	½	1	½	½	-	½	1	0	0	½	½	½	1	½	½	1	1	9½
7	(Soviet Union) Leonid Yudasin	2505	0	½	½	1	½	½	-	½	½	1	½	½	½	½	½	½	½	½	9
8	(Soviet Union) Alexander Beliavsky	2655	½	½	½	0	0	0	½	-	½	½	0	½	1	1	1	½	½	1	8½
9	(Soviet Union) Jaan Ehlvest	2580	½	½	½	½	½	1	½	½	-	0	½	½	0	0	1	½	½	½	8
10	(Soviet Union) Vassily Smyslov	2550	½	½	0	0	1	1	0	½	1	-	½	½	½	½	0	½	½	½	8
11	(Soviet Union) Viktor Gavrikov	2545	½	0	½	½	½	½	½	1	½	½	-	½	½	½	½	½	0	½	8
12	(Soviet Union) Andrei Sokolov	2600	½	½	0	½	½	½	½	½	½	½	½	-	½	½	½	0	1	½	8
13	(Soviet Union) Rafael Vaganian	2595	½	½	½	0	0	½	½	0	1	½	½	½	-	½	½	1	½	½	8
14	(Soviet Union) Alexander Khalifman	2530	½	½	½	0	½	0	½	0	1	½	½	½	½	-	½	½	½	½	7½
15	(Soviet Union) Ilia Smirin	2500	0	0	½	½	½	½	½	0	0	1	½	½	½	½	-	0	1	½	7
16	(Soviet Union) Mikhail Gurevich	2630	0	0	0	0	½	½	½	½	½	½	½	1	0	½	1	-	½	½	7
17	(Soviet Union) Vladimir Malaniuk	2520	½	0	½	0	0	0	½	½	½	½	1	0	½	½	0	½	-	½	6
18	(Soviet Union) Andrei Kharitonov	2550	0	0	0	½	½	0	½	0	½	½	½	½	½	½	½	½	½	-	6
