= Khvicha Supatashvili =

Georgian chess player (born 1969)

Personal information
- Born: 31 March 1969 (age 57) Kutaisi, Georgia
- Spouse: Maka Babunashvili (m. 1996)

Chess career
- Country: Soviet Union; Georgia
- Title: International Master (1993)
- FIDE rating: 2463 (October 2026)
- Peak rating: 2515 (October 2001)

Khvicha Supatashvili (Georgian: ხვიჩა სუპატაშვილი; born 31 March 1969) is a Georgian chess International Master (IM) (1993) and Georgian Chess Championship winner (1992).

== Career ==
=== As a chess player ===
In the 1990s, Khvicha Supatashvili was one of the leading Georgian chess players. In 1992, he won Georgian Chess Championship. In 2002, in Moscow he participated in FIDE World Chess Championship, in which he lost the first round against Alexey Dreev.

Khvicha Supatashvili played for Georgia in the Chess Olympiads:

- In 1994, at first reserve board in the 31st Chess Olympiad in Moscow (+1, =4, -0),
- In 1996, at second reserve board in the 32nd Chess Olympiad in Yerevan (+3, =3, -2),
- In 1998, at second reserve board in the 33rd Chess Olympiad in Elista (+1, =6, -1).

Khvicha Supatashvili played for Georgia in the European Team Chess Championships:

- In 1992, at fourth board in the 10th European Team Chess Championship in Debrecen (+2, =3, -2),
- In 2001, at third board in the 13th European Team Chess Championship in León (+1, =2, -2).

Khvicha Supatashvili played for Georgia in the World Youth U26 Team Chess Championship:

- In 1995, at first board in the 10th World Youth U26 Team Chess Championship in Parnaíba (+3, =2, -1) and won team gold medal.

In 1993, Khvicha Supatashvili was awarded the FIDE International Master (IM) title.

=== As a chess coach ===
In recent years, Khvicha Supatashvili has rarely participated in chess tournaments, because he has begun his coaching career.

From 1995 - 2011, he was a personal coach of Maia Chiburdanidze and during this period of time, Chiburdanidze became a semifinalist of the Women's World Chess Championship twice. As a result of being a head coach of the Georgian women's Olympic team, the team placed second in the 34th Chess Olympiad in Istanbul. Since 2004, he was also working with the Georgian men's team, concretely, with Zurab Azmaiparashvili, Baadur Jobava, Giorgi Kacheishvili, Zviad Izoria, Mikheil Mchedlishvili, Levan Pantsulaia, Tamaz Gelashvili, Konstantine Shanava, David Jojua, Tornike Sanikidze, Giorgi Margvelashvili, David Arutinian, Merab Gagunashvili, Dawit Schengelia, and Valeriane Gaprindashvili. As for the women's team, except Maia Chiburdanidze, Supatashvili trained grandmasters – Nino Khurtsidze, Salome Melia, Lela Javakhishvili, Maia Lomineishvili, Meri Arabidze, Sopiko Khukhashvili, Natalia Edzgveradze.

Since 2014, Supatashvili has been a personal trainer for Nana Dzagnidze. Under training with Supatashvili, Dzagnidze showed the best result - 8 (eight) point from 9 (nine) at The 41st Chess Olympiad in 2014, on the women's first board. Also, in 2017, as a result of being the winner of the European Individual Championship in Riga and the winner of the World Blitz Chess Championship in Riyadh, Dzagnidze was nominated as a world's best female chess player. In 2019, on the European Team Chess Championship in Batumi, Georgia, she was the best on the women's first board. In 2020, Dzagnidze won FIDE Women's Grand Prix in Lausanne, Switzerland.

Also, since 2014, Supatashvili has been a trainer of Nino Khomeriki, who won the European Youth Chess Championships in 2015 and 2016.

From 2014 - 2018 , Supatashvili was working with Irakli Beradze and Giorgi Sibashvili. In 2014, Sibashvili won the second prize in the European Youth Chess Championship.

In 2014, Supatashvili was the head coach of Batumi Chess Club "Nona" that became the winner of the European Chess Club Cup (2014).

== Recognition ==
Supatashvili is the owner of the Georgian state awards – Honor Medal (2000 year) and Order of Honor (2008 year) chevalier.

Achievements in the women's team:

- In 2000 – Women's 34th Chess Olympiad; Istanbul, Turkey; Second place;
- In 2008 - Women's 38th Chess Olympiad; Dresden, Germany; First place;
- In 2017 – European Team Chess Championship; Crete, Greece; Second place;
- In 2017 – World Team Chess Championship; Khanty-Mansiysk, Russia; Third place;
- In 2018 – Women's 43rd Chess Olympiad; Batumi, Georgia; Third Place;
- In 2019 – European Team Chess Championship; Batumi, Georgia; Second place.
