= Georgian Chess Championship =

Following are the official winners of the national Georgian Chess Championships from 1928 to date. Until 1990 the Georgian Soviet Socialist Republic was a republic within the Soviet Union.

== Winners ==
Nr	Year	Men's Winner
1	1928	Victor Goglidze
2	1938	Archil Ebralidze
3	1939	Archil Ebralidze
4	1941	Archil Ebralidze
5	1944	Vladas Mikėnas
6	1946	Paul Keres (off contest); Archil Ebralidze
7	1947	Nikolay Sorokin
8	1948	Mikhail Shishov
9	1949	Akaki Pirtskhalava
10	1950	Alexandre Blagidze
11	1951	Nikolay Sorokin
12	1952	Mikhail Shishov
13	1953	Alexandre Blagidze
14	1954	Alexandr Buslaev
15	1955	Bukhuti Gurgenidze
16	1956	Mikhail Shishov
17	1957	Alexandre Blagidze
18	1958	Bukhuti Gurgenidze
19	1959	Bukhuti Gurgenidze
20	1960	Bukhuti Gurgenidze
21	1961	Bukhuti Gurgenidze
22	1962	Bukhuti Gurgenidze
23	1963	Bukhuti Gurgenidze
24	1964	Bukhuti Gurgenidze
25	1965	Bukhuti Gurgenidze
26	1966	Roman Dzindzichashvili
27	1967	Roman Dzindzichashvili
28	1968	Bukhuti Gurgenidze
29	1969	Roman Dzindzichashvili
30	1970	Bukhuti Gurgenidze
31	1971	Zurab Mikadze; Alexandre Bokuchava
32	1972	Tamaz Giorgadze
33	1973	Bukhuti Gurgenidze
34	1974	Elizbar Ubilava
35	1975	Zurab Sturua
36	1976	Iuri Chikovani
37	1977	Zurab Sturua
38	1978	Gennadi Zaichik
39	1979	Gennadi Zaichik
40	1980	Zurab Azmaiparashvili
41	1981	Zurab Sturua
42	1982	Giorgi Giorgadze
43	1984	Zurab Sturua
44	1985	Zurab Sturua
45	1986	Elizbar Ubilava
46	1987	Mikhail Krasenkov
47	1988	Giorgi Giorgadze
48	1989	Giorgi Bagaturov
49	1990	Alexandre Dgebuadze
50	1991	Tamaz Tabatadze
51	1992	Khvicha Supatashvili
52	1993	Akaki Shalamberidze
53	1994	Lasha Janjgava
54	1995	Giorgi Bagaturov
55	1996	Lasha Janjgava
56	1997	Giorgi Kacheishvili
57	1998	Nino Khurtsidze
58	1999	Giorgi Bagaturov
59	2000	Tamaz Gelashvili
60	2001	Mikheil Mchedlishvili
61	2002	Mikheil Mchedlishvili
62	2003	Baadur Jobava
63	2004	Merab Gagunashvili
64	2005	Valeriane Gaprindashvili
65	2006	Giorgi Kacheishvili
66	2007	Baadur Jobava
67	2008	Levan Pantsulaia
68	2009	Tornike Sanikidze
69	2010	Merab Gagunashvili
70	2011	Davit Zarkua
71	2012	Baadur Jobava
72	2013	Gaioz Nigalidze
73	2014	Gaioz Nigalidze
74	2015	Levan Pantsulaia
75	2016	Davit Jojua
76	2017	Luka Paichadze
77	2018	Mikheil Mchedlishvili
78	2019	Giga Quparadze
79	2020	Luka Paichadze
80	2021	Levan Pantsulaia
81	2022	Levan Pantsulaia
82	2023	Mikheil Mchedlishvili
83	2024	Baadur Jobava
84	2025	Levan Pantsulaia
85	2026	Baadur Jobava

Nr	Year	Women's Winner
1	1935	Fani Kats
2	1936	Fani Kats
3	1937	Berta Krezberg
4	1938	Varvara Zargarian
5	1941	Varvara Zargarian
6	1941	Ksenia Gogiava
7	1945	Varvara Zargarian
8	1947	Ksenia Gogiava
9	1948	Lili Gelovani
10	1950	Ksenia Gogiava
11	1952	Ksenia Gogiava
12	1953	Eliso Kakabadze
13	1954	Eliso Kakabadze
14	1955	Eliso Kakabadze
15	1956	Nona Gaprindashvili
16	1957	Eliso Kakabadze
17	1958	Manana Togonidze
18	1959	Nona Gaprindashvili
19	1960	Nona Gaprindashvili
20	1961	Nona Gaprindashvili
21	1963	Alla Chaikovskaya
22	1964	Nana Alexandria
23	1965	Nana Alexandria
24	1966	Tsitsino Kakhabrishvili
25	1968	Nana Alexandria
26	1969	Tsiuri Kobaidze
27	1970	Tsitsino Kakhabrishvili
28	1971	Svetlana Kalandarishvili
29	1972	Tamar Khmiadashvili
30	1973	Tsitsino Kakhabrishvili
31	1974	Tsiuri Kobaidze
32	1975	Tamar Khmiadashvili
33	1976	Nino Gurieli
34	1977	Nino Melashvili
35	1978	Tamar Khmiadashvili
36	1979	Tamila Meskhi
37	1980	Tsiala Kasoshvili
38	1981	Tsiala Kasoshvili
39	1982	Tsitsino Kakhabrishvili
40	1983	Ketevan Arakhamia
41	1984	Ketevan Arakhamia
42	1985	Genrieta Lagvilava
43	1986	Sopiko Tereladze; Ketevan Melashvili
44	1987	Ketino Kachiani
45	1988	Tsiala Kasoshvili
46	1989	Nino Khurtsidze
47	1990	Ketevan Arakhamia
48	1991	Inga Khurtsilava
49	1992	Nino Gurieli
50	1993	Nino Khurtsidze
51	1994	Natia Janjgava
52	1995	Miranda Khorava
53	1996	Maia Lomineishvili
54	1997	Inga Khurtsilava
55	1998	Maia Lomineishvili
56	1999	Inga Charkhalashvili
57	2000	Sopiko Tereladze; Inga Khurtsilava
58	2001	Lela Javakhishvili
59	2002	Maia Lomineishvili, Ana Matnadze
60	2003	Nana Dzagnidze
61	2004	Nana Dzagnidze
62	2005	Nino Khurtsidze
63	2006	Nino Khurtsidze
64	2007	Lela Javakhishvili, Sopiko Khukhashvili
65	2008	Nana Dzagnidze, Salome Melia
66	2009	Maia Lomineishvili
67	2010	Salome Melia
68	2011	Maia Lomineishvili
69	2012	Bela Khotenashvili
70	2013	Nino Khurtsidze
71	2014	Lela Javakhishvili
72	2015	Nino Batsiashvili
73	2016	Lela Javakhishvili
74	2017	Bela Khotenashvili
75	2018	Nino Batsiashvili
76	2019	Meri Arabidze
77	2020	Nino Batsiashvili
78	2021	Bela Khotenashvili
79	2022	Nino Batsiashvili
80	2023	Bela Khotenashvili
81	2024	Lela Javakhishvili
82	2025	Nana Dzagnidze
83	2026	Nino Batsiashvili
