= Khvicha =

Khvicha (Georgian: ხვიჩა) is a masculine Georgian given name that may refer to:

- Khvicha Kvaratskhelia, Georgian footballer
- Khvicha Jakhaia, Georgian water polo player
- Khvicha Bichinashvili, Azerbaijani wrestler of Georgian origin
- Khvicha Supatashvili, Georgian chess player
