= Tsiala Kasoshvili =

Georgian chess player

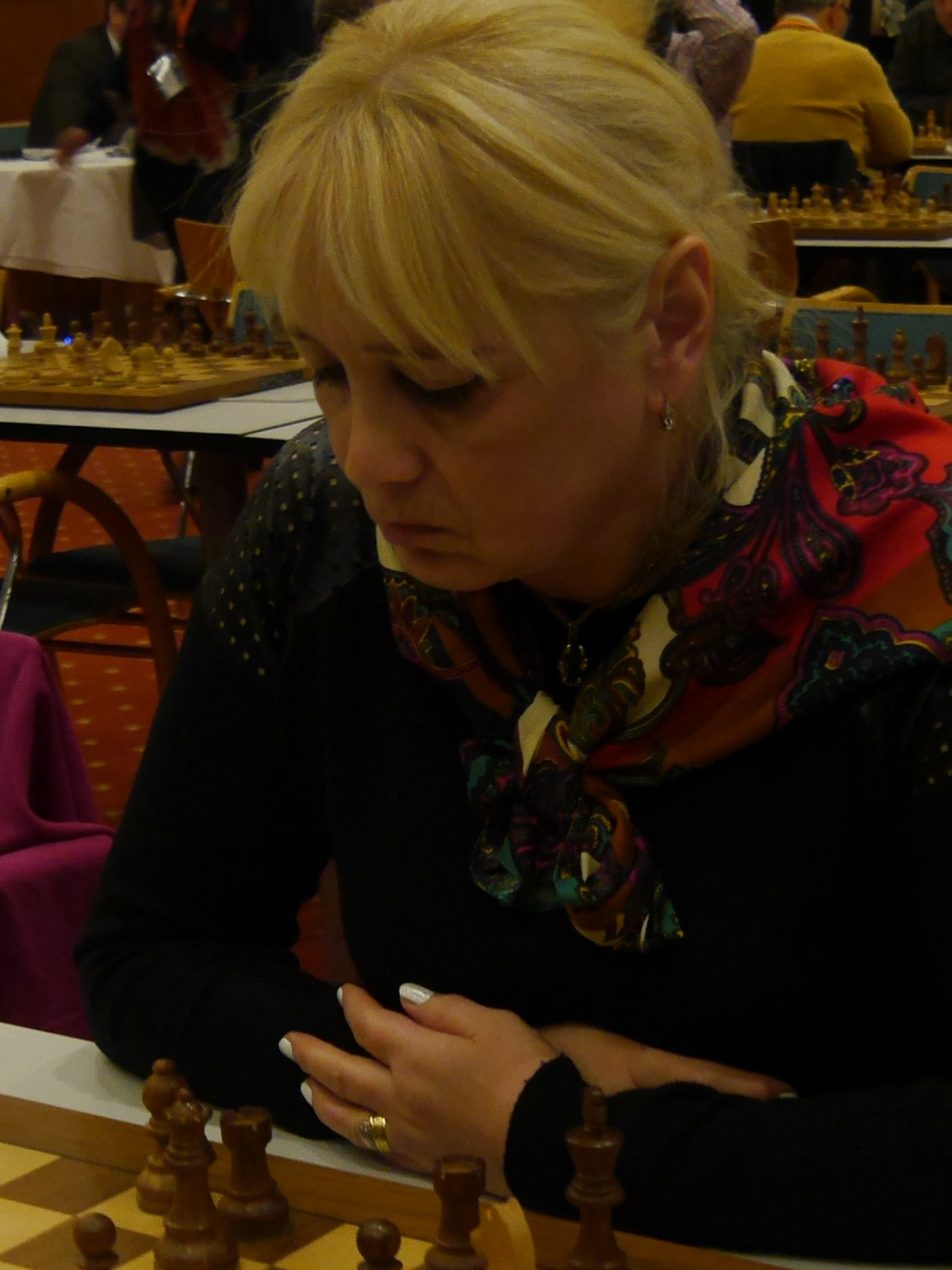

Personal information
- Born: September 1, 1963 (age 62) Gori, Georgia

Chess career
- Country: Georgia
- Title: Woman International Master (1988)
- Peak rating: 2265 (January 1989)

Tsiala Kasoshvili (born September 1, 1963 in Gori) is a Woman International chess Master (WIM) since 1988, her highest chess rating is 2265 (in Jan. 1989).

She is the National Georgian Woman Chess Champion in 1980, 1981 and 1988.
