= Berta Krezberg =

Soviet chess player

Personal information
- Born: 17 September 1911 Vologda, Russia
- Died: 22 August 1992 (aged 80) Moscow, Russia

Chess career
- Country: Soviet Union

Berta Krezberg (Russian: Берта Давыдовна Крезберг; 17 September 1911, Vologda — 22 August 1992, Moscow) was a Soviet chess player who won the Georgian Women Chess Championship (1937).

== Chess career ==
From 1935 to 1938 she lived in Tbilisi. Berta Krezberg took part in the Georgian Women Chess Championship, where she shared 1st—2nd place in 1936, but lost an additional match for the title of champion. In 1937 Berta Krezberg became the winner of Georgian Women Chess Championship. After returning from Georgia, she worked as a senior instructor at one of the Moscow factory. Since 1938, she headed the chess section in this factory. During the World War II Berta Krezberg took part in the patronage of hospital work. After the war, she successfully participated in the Moscow Women's Chess Championships, in which she took second place in 1945 (behind Elisaveta Bykova), in 1952 she shared 3rd—4th places, and in 1958 she shared 3rd—5th place. From 1937 to 1952 she six times participated in the USSR Women's Chess Championship. The best result was shown in 1951, when she divided the 5th—7th place. In 1958, she played for the Moscow city team in a traditional match against the Leningrad city team. In 1971, she took the fourth place at the sports society "Lokomotive" Women Chess Championship.

== Literature ==
- Игорь Бердичевский. Шахматная еврейская энциклопедия. Москва: Русский шахматный дом, 2016. ISBN 978-5-94693-503-6
