= Tsitsino Kakhabrishvili =

Georgian chess player

Tsitsino Kakhabrishvili (born 14 November 1946) is a Georgian chess player, her highest rating is 2185 (in Jan. 1987)

She is the National Georgian Woman Chess Champion 4 times in the years: 1966, 1970, 1973, and 1982.
