= Luka Paichadze =

Georgian chess grandmaster (born 1979)

Personal information
- Born: 6 March 1991 (age 35)

Chess career
- Country: Georgia
- Title: Grandmaster (2012)
- FIDE rating: 2465 (July 2026)
- Peak rating: 2588 (January 2018)

Luka Paichadze (born 6 March 1991) is a Georgian chess player who received the FIDE title of Grandmaster in September 2012.

== Chess career ==
Paichadze won the Nona Gaprindashvili Cup Open A in 2014, and has twice won the Georgian Chess Championship, in 2017 and 2020.

He qualified for the Chess World Cup 2021, where he was defeated by Shamsiddin Vokhidov in the first round.
