= Giorgi Bagaturov =

Georgian-Armenian chess grandmaster (born 1964)

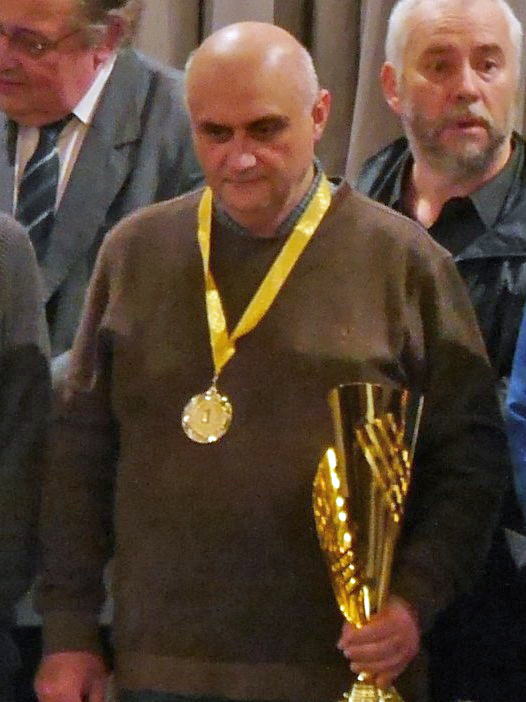
- World Senior Championship 2016

Personal information
- Born: November 28, 1964 (age 61)

Chess career
- Country: Georgia
- Title: Grandmaster (1999)
- Peak rating: 2543 (January 1999)

Giorgi Bagaturov (born November 28, 1964) is a Georgian-Armenian chess grandmaster. He is a three-time Georgian Chess Champion and won the World Senior Championship's over-50 section in 2016.

== Chess career ==
In 1997, Bagaturov tied for first through third place with Stanislav Savchenko and Alexander Moroz in the Danko Chess Tournament in Yenakiieve. He played for Georgia in the Chess Olympiad of 1998. In 1998 tied for 7th–11th with Zurab Sturua, Ioannis Nikolaidis, Angelos Vouldis and Ashot Nadanian in the Zonal tournament in Panormo, Crete, which was the qualifying tournament for the FIDE World Chess Championship 1999. In 2000 he tied for second through sixth place with Roman Slobodjan, Ventzislav Inkiov, Leonid Gofshtein and Stefan Đurić in the Arco Chess Festival. In 2008 he tied for second/third place with Tamaz Gelashvili in the Gyumri International tournament. In 2011, he won the Thessaloniki International Open "Alexander the Great".

On the May 2011 FIDE list, Bagaturov's Elo rating was 2459.
