= Mikheil Mchedlishvili =

Georgian chess grandmaster (born 1979)

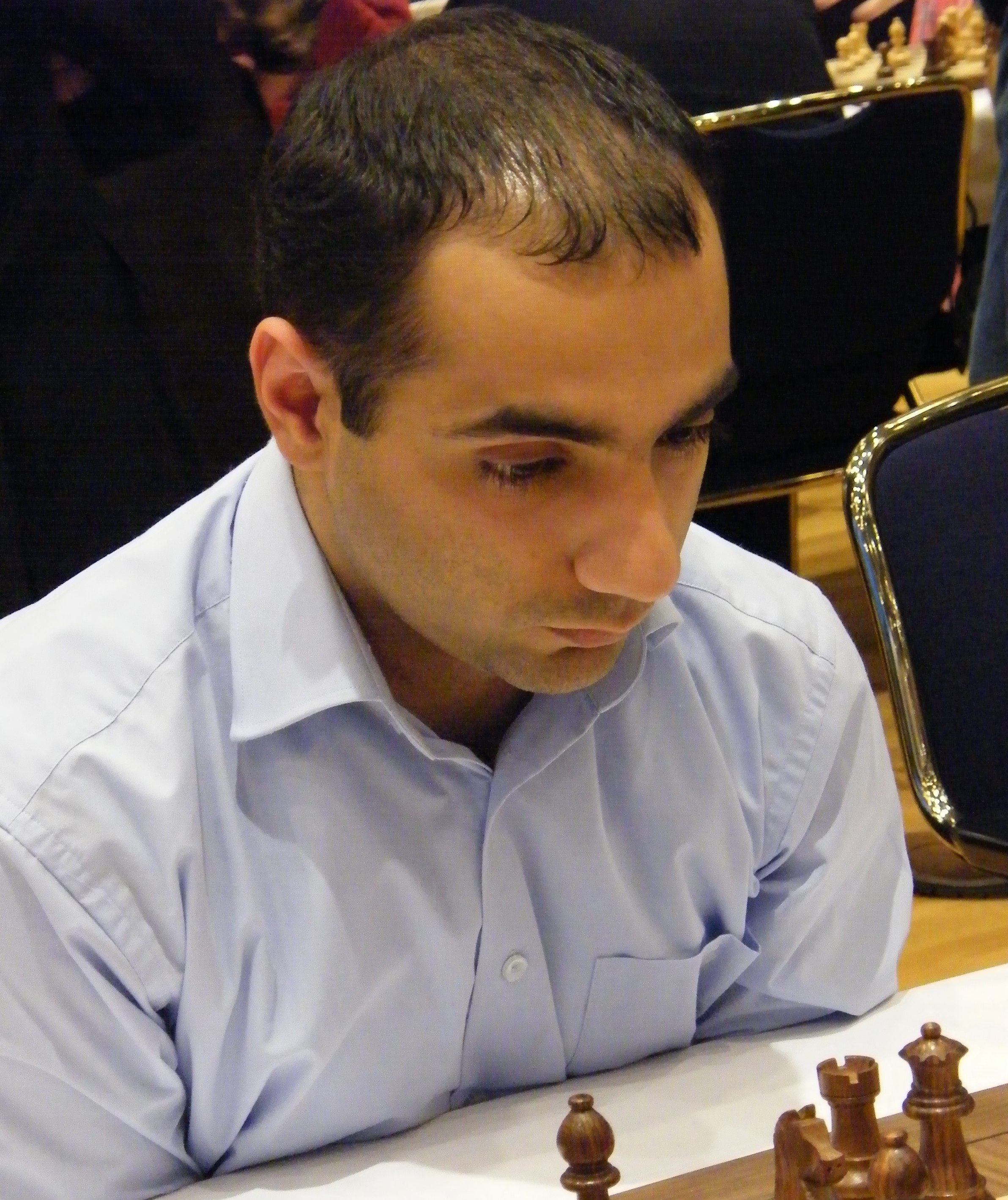
- Mchedlishvili at the 38th Chess Olympiad, 2008

Personal information
- Born: June 4, 1979 (age 47)

Chess career
- Country: Georgia
- Title: Grandmaster (2002)
- FIDE rating: 2550 (July 2026)
- Peak rating: 2659 (August 2012)
- Peak ranking: No. 84 (April 2008)

Mikheil Mchedlishvili (Georgian: მიხეილ მჭედლიშვილი; born 4 June 1979) is a Georgian chess grandmaster. He is a four-time Georgian Chess Champion.

== Chess career ==
Born in 1979, Mchedlishvili won the Georgian Chess Championship in 2001 and earned his grandmaster title in 2002. He has since won the Georgian Championship in 2002, 2018 and 2023.

He has competed in six Chess Olympiads, the 35th and the 38th to 42nd.

He played in the Chess World Cup 2017, where was knocked out in the first round by Ernesto Inarkiev.
