= Giorgi Kacheishvili =

Georgian chess grandmaster (born 1977)

Personal information
- Born: 10 February 1977 (age 49) Tbilisi, Georgia

Chess career
- Country: Georgia
- Title: Grandmaster (1997)
- FIDE rating: 2582 (July 2026)
- Peak rating: 2612 (April 2009)

Giorgi Kacheishvili (Georgian: გიორგი კაჭეიშვილი; born 10 February 1977) is a Georgian chess Grandmaster (GM) (1997), two-times Georgian Chess Championship winner (1997, 2006), European Team Chess Championship team and individual medalist (1997, 2003).

== Biography ==
Giorgi Kacheishvili has repeatedly represented Georgia at the European Youth Chess Championship and World Youth Chess Championships in various age groups. Giorgi Kacheishvili achieved his best result in 1994, in Szeged when he won bronze medal in European Youth Chess Championship in U18 age group.

In 1997, Giorgi Kacheishvili won the Georgian Chess Championship but in 2006 he repeated this success. In 2000, he won silver medal in Georgian Chess Championship.

In 2004, in Tripoli he participated in FIDE World Chess Championship and lose to Vasilios Kotronias in the first round.

Giorgi Kacheishvili is winner of many international chess tournaments, including Stockerau (1993), Wiesbaden (1996), New York City (1998, 2008), Trignac (2001), Senden (2001), Philadelphia (2006 (World Open chess tournament), 2009), Istanbul (2006), Berkeley (2008), Las Vegas (2008), St. Louis (2011).

Giorgi Kacheishvili played for Georgia in the Chess Olympiads:

- In 2000, at fourth board in the 34th Chess Olympiad in Istanbul (+3, =3, -4),
- In 2004, at second board in the 36th Chess Olympiad in Calvià (+1, =7, -1),
- In 2006, at third board in the 37th Chess Olympiad in Turin (+3, =4, -3).

Giorgi Kacheishvili played for Georgia in the European Team Chess Championships:

- In 1992, at reserve board in the 10th European Team Chess Championship in Debrecen (+2, =5, -0),
- In 1997, at reserve board in the 11th European Team Chess Championship in Pula (+4, =4, -1) and won individual silver medal,
- In 1999, at second board in the 12th European Team Chess Championship in Batumi (+3, =3, -2),
- In 2001, at second board in the 13th European Team Chess Championship in León (+1, =2, -4),
- In 2003, at fourth board in the 14th European Team Chess Championship in Plovdiv (+5, =3, -0) and won team and individual bronze medals.

Giorgi Kacheishvili played for Georgia in the World Youth U26 Team Chess Championship:

- In 1995, at second board in the 10th World Youth U26 Team Chess Championship in Parnaíba (+3, =4, -0) and won team gold medal,
- In 1997, at first board in the 11th World Youth U26 Team Chess Championship in Sáenz Peña (+2, =4, -2).

In 1994, he awarded the FIDE International Master (IM) title, and in 1997 he achieved the Grandmaster (GM) title.
