= Lasha Janjgava =

Georgian chess grandmaster (born 1970)

Personal information
- Born: 5 May 1970 (age 56)

Chess career
- Country: Soviet Union; Georgia
- Title: Grandmaster (1990)
- FIDE rating: 2470 (July 2026)
- Peak rating: 2510 (January 1993)

Lasha Janjgava (Georgian: ლაშა ჯანჯღავა; born 5 May 1970) is a Georgian chess Grandmaster (GM) (1990), two-times Georgian Chess Championship winner (1994, 1996).

== Biography ==
During the 1980s and 1990s Lasha Janjgava was one of the leading Georgian chess players. At the turn of 1989/90 he was very successful in Hastings, where in the Scheveningen system tournament he shared 1st place with Joseph Gallagher, Gregory Kaidanov and Sergey Smagin. In 1991, Lasha Janjgava shared the 3rd place with Maia Chiburdanidze (behind Zurab Sturua and Giorgi Giorgadze) in Tbilisi. In 1992, he won in Antwerp Academic World Chess Championship. He twice won Georgian Chess Championships: in 1994 and 1996.

Lasha Janjgava played for Georgia in the Chess Olympiads:

- In 1992, at second reserve board in the 30th Chess Olympiad in Manila (+0, =4, -0),
- In 1994, at first reserve board in the 31st Chess Olympiad in Moscow (+0, =2, -3),
- In 1996, at second board in the 32nd Chess Olympiad in Yerevan (+1, =0, -2),
- In 1998, at second reserve board in the 33rd Chess Olympiad in Elista (+1, =3, -1).

Lasha Janjgava played for Georgia in the European Team Chess Championships:

- In 1992, at third board in the 10th European Team Chess Championship in Debrecen (+1, =4, -1),
- In 2005, at first reserve board in the 15th European Team Chess Championship in Gothenburg (+1, =1, -0).

In 1989, Lasha Janjgava was awarded the FIDE International Master (IM) title and received the FIDE Grandmaster (GM) title year later. He is FIDE Trainer (2010).

In recent years Lasha Janjgava has rarely participated in chess tournaments.
