= Nino Khurtsidze =

Georgian chess player (1975–2018)

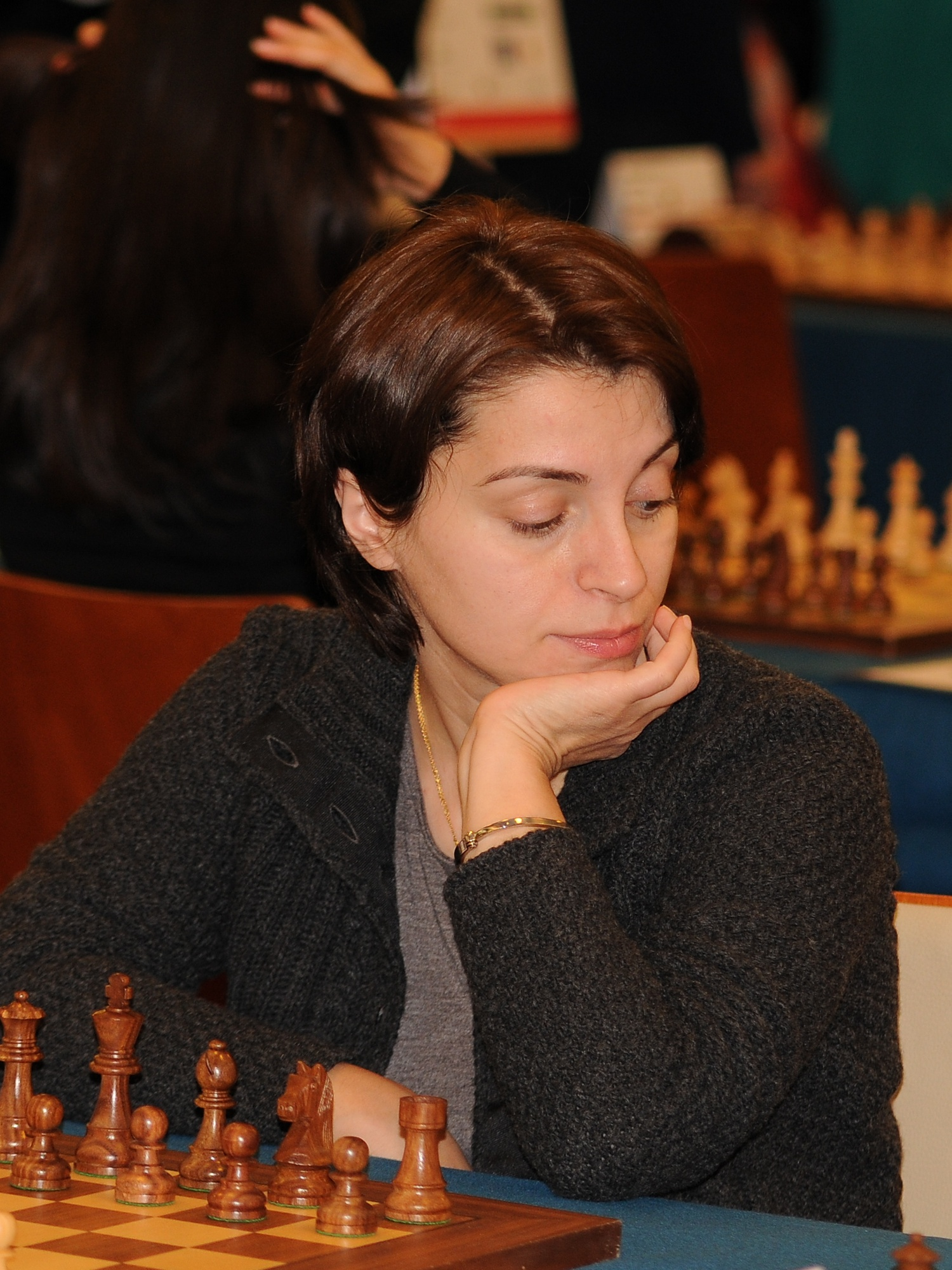
- Khurtsidze in 2013

Personal information
- Born: 28 August 1975 Soviet Union
- Died: 22 April 2018 (aged 42) Tbilisi, Georgia

Chess career
- Country: Georgia
- Title: International Master (1999); Woman Grandmaster (1993)
- Peak rating: 2472 (July 1999)

Nino Khurtsidze (Georgian: ნინო ხურციძე; 28 August 1975 – 22 April 2018) was a Georgian chess player. She was awarded the FIDE title of Woman Grandmaster (WGM) in 1993 and International Master (IM) in 1999. She won the World Girls U-20 Chess Championship in 1993 and 1995. Khurtsidze also won the World Girls U-16 Chess Championship of 1991 in Guarapuava, Brazil, the European U-20 Girls Championship in 1992, the Men's Georgian Chess Championship in 1998 (the only Georgian female player to do so) and the women's Georgian championship five times (in 1989, 1993, 2005, 2006 and 2013).

== Career ==
She took part in the Women's Interzonal Tournament in 1993 in Jakarta, Indonesia and 1995 in Chişinău, Moldova. These events were part of the Women's World Chess Championship cycle of 1996 and 1999 respectively.

In 1998 she won in Rotterdam the Women's championship for Universities, organised by the FISU.

Khurtsidze competed in the Women's World Championship held with the knockout format in 2000, 2001, 2004, 2006, 2008, 2012, 2015 and 2017. Her best results occurred at Moscow 2001 (reaching the final 8, where she was defeated by the eventual winner, Zhu Chen), at Yekaterinburg 2006 (final 8 - defeated by Alisa Galliamova), and at Tehran 2017 (final 16 - defeated by Antoaneta Stefanova).

In team events, Khurtsidze played for Georgia in the Women's Chess Olympiad in 1998, 2000, 2002, 2006 and 2012, the Women's World Team Chess Championship in 2007, 2011, the team winning the bronze medal, and 2013, and the Women's European Team Chess Championship in 1999, 2003, 2005, 2007, 2009, 2011 and 2013. She was on the Georgian women's team in the 4th World Team Chess Championship, held in Lucerne, Switzerland in 1997. Khurtsidze also competed in the European Club Cup for Women with five different teams in 1996, 1999, 2001, 2005, 2006, 2007, 2008, 2009 and 2010.

In 2004, she came second behind Yevgeny Shaposhnikov in the Essen Open tournament. In 2005, she was the number two rated female chess player in Georgia with a FIDE rating of 2420. In 2012 Khurtsidze took part in the FIDE Women's Grand Prix tournament in Jermuk, Armenia.

She resided in Tbilisi and was coached for many years by GM Konstantin Aseev.

Khurtsidze died of cancer in April 2018.
