= Nikolay Sorokin =

Russian handball player (born 1982)

Personal information
- Nationality: Russian
- Born: 23 July 1982 (age 44) Volgograd, Russia
- Height: 1.85 m (6 ft 1 in)

Sport
- Sport: Handball
- Position: Goalkeeper
- Current club: HC Kaustik Volgograd
- Number: 12
National team
Years	Team	Apps	(Gls)
–	Russia	5	(0)

Nikolay Sorokin (born 23 July 1982) is a Russian handball player for Russian club HC Kaustik Volgograd. He also played for the Russian national team.
