= Valeriane Gaprindashvili =

Georgian chess grandmaster (born 1982)

Personal information
- Born: January 16, 1982 (age 44) Georgian SSR, Soviet Union

Chess career
- Country: Georgia
- Title: Grandmaster (2002)
- Peak rating: 2491 (April 2003)

Valeriane Gaprindashvili (Georgian: ვალერიანე გაფრინდაშვილი; born January 16, 1982) is a Georgian chess grandmaster (2002) and Georgian Champion in 2005.

In 1993 and 1994, he won the European Youth Chess Championship U12. In 1995, he won the World Youth Chess Championship U14. He played for Georgia in the European Team Chess Championship of 1999.

On the May 2010 FIDE list his Elo rating is 2415.

He plays on the Internet Chess Club (ICC) under the pseudonym "PapaJB".
