= Leonid Yurtaev =

Kyrgyzstani chess grandmaster (1959–2011)

- Yurtaev in 2000

Personal information
- Born: Leonid Nikolayevich Yurtaev; 3 April 1959 Frunze, Kyrgyz Soviet Socialist Republic
- Died: 2 June 2011 (aged 52)

Chess career
- Country: Kyrgyzstan
- Title: Grandmaster (1996)
- Peak rating: 2552 (July 2000)

Leonid Nikolayevich Yurtaev (3 April 1959, Frunze – 2 June 2011) was a Kyrgyz chess player. In 1986 he was awarded the FIDE title of International Master (IM) and in 1996 he became the first Kyrgyz player to receive the Grandmaster (GM) title. He was noted as a tactician, and in particular as a specialist in the King's Indian Defence.

He defeated a number of strong grandmasters during his career, including Mikhail Tal, Vassily Ivanchuk and Garry Kasparov, but he was not particularly successful in tournaments. According to the Chessmetrics web site, his best tournament performance was at the 1987 Armed Forces championship in Sverdlovsk, which he won with Vladimir Tukmakov with a score of 7/8. He qualified for the final USSR Chess Championship in 1991, finishing in shared 23rd place.

In 2007 Yurtaev won the 1st Georgy Agzamov Memorial held in Tashkent on tiebreak over Marat Dzhumaev and Sergey Kayumov.

He represented Kyrgyzstan at seven Olympiads in 1992, 1994, 1996, 1998, 2000, 2006 and 2008. In 2008, he was a reserve player but didn't play a game.
