= Giorgi Giorgadze =

Georgian chess grandmaster (born 1964)

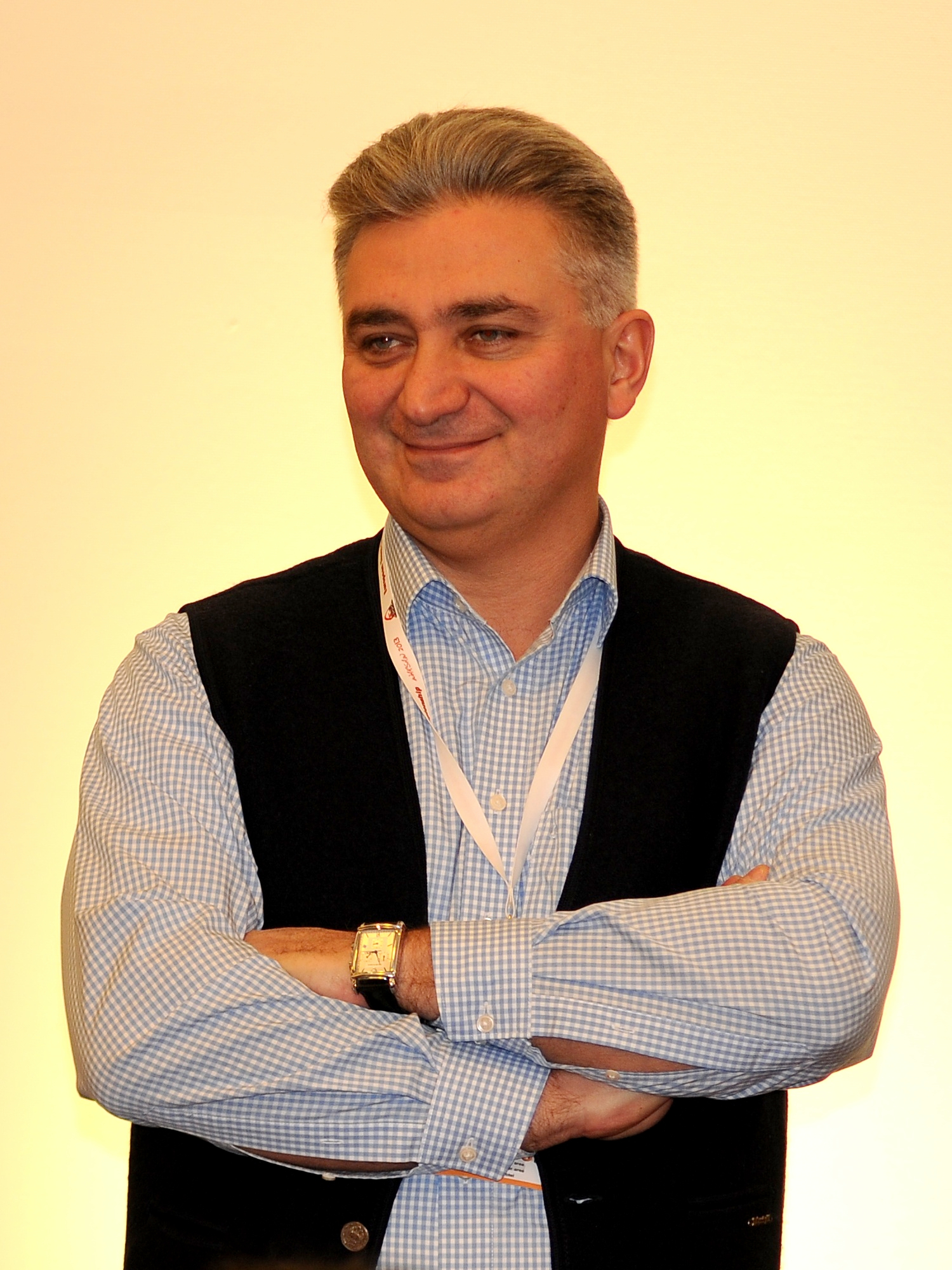
- Giorgi Giorgadze in 2013

Personal information
- Born: 10 October 1964 (age 61)

Chess career
- Country: Soviet Union; Georgia
- Title: Grandmaster (1993)
- FIDE rating: 2569 (July 2026)
- Peak rating: 2625 (July 1997)
- Peak ranking: No. 44 (July 1997)

Giorgi Giorgadze (Georgian: გიორგი გიორგაძე; born 10 October 1964) is a former Soviet, current Georgian chess Grandmaster (GM) (1993), two-times Georgian Chess Championship winner (1982, 1988), Chess Olympiad individual bronze medalist (1996).

== Biography ==
From the early 1980s, Giorgi Giorgadze was one of the leading Georgian chess players. In 1982 and 1988 he won Georgian Chess Championship. In 1989, Giorgi Giorgadze qualified to the Soviet Chess Championship final tournament, finishing in Odesa in 12th place. In 1997, in Groningen he participated in FIDE World Chess Championship, in which in first round he won Étienne Bacrot and in the second round he lost to Michael Adams. In 2007, in Tbilisi he won bronze medal in Georgian Chess Championship.

Giorgi Giorgadze has participated in international chess tournaments many times, winning or sharing the first places, including in:

- Nałęczów (1989);
- San Sebastián (1991);
- Mondariz – (three times: 1994, 1999, and 2001);
- Ankara (1995, FIDE Zonal tournament);
- A Coruña – (twice: 1995, and 1996);
- Bad Wörishofen (1998);
- Benasque (2002).

Giorgi Giorgadze played for Georgia in the Chess Olympiads:

- In 1992, at fourth board in the 30th Chess Olympiad in Manila (+6, =4, -3),
- In 1994, at fourth board in the 31st Chess Olympiad in Moscow (+5, =5, -2),
- In 1996, at second board in the 32nd Chess Olympiad in Yerevan (+6, =5, -1) and won individual bronze medal,
- In 1998, at second board in the 33rd Chess Olympiad in Elista (+2, =5, -3),
- In 2000, at second board in the 34th Chess Olympiad in Istanbul (+2, =7, -1).

Giorgi Giorgadze played for Georgia in the World Team Chess Championship:

- In 2005, at third board in the 6th World Team Chess Championship in Beer Sheva (+0, =3, -0).

Giorgi Giorgadze played for Georgia in the European Team Chess Championships:

- In 1992, at second board in the 10th European Team Chess Championship in Debrecen (+1, =5, -2),
- In 1997, at second board in the 11th European Team Chess Championship in Pula (+0, =8, -1),
- In 1999, at first board in the 12th European Team Chess Championship in Batumi (+1, =4, -3).

In 1993, he was awarded the FIDE Grandmaster (GM) title.
