= Gennadi Zaichik =

Georgian-American chess grandmaster (born 1957)

Personal information
- Born: 11 February 1957 (age 69) Tbilisi, Georgian SSR, Soviet Union

Chess career
- Country: Soviet Union (until 1991); Georgia (1992–2001); United States (since 2002)
- Title: Grandmaster (1984)
- FIDE rating: 2457 (July 2026)
- Peak rating: 2550 (July 1996)

Gennadi Lvovich Zaichik (Russian: Геннадий Львович Зайчик; born 11 February 1957) is a Georgian chess and American (from 2002) Grandmaster (GM) (1984) who twice won the Georgian Chess Championship (1977 and 1978).

== Biography ==
Gennadi Zaichik began to achieve his first significant successes in the early 1980s. In 1982 in Telavi he shared second place with Georgy Agzamov (behind Rafael Vaganian) in the Soviet Chess Championship First League. A year later, in Jūrmala, he finished third in the Soviet Junior Chess Championship in the U26 age group, while also winning the international tournament in Kecskemét. In 1984, Zaichik won the Rubinstein Memorial in Polanica-Zdrój. In 1984, Gennadi Zaichik was awarded the FIDE Grandmaster (GM) title.

In 1985, Zaichik finished second in the International chess tournament Bohemians in Prague. In 1987, he won the Capablanca Memorial B tournament in Camagüey and shared first place with Viswanathan Anand) in Coimbatore. In 1989, Zaichik shared second place in Berlin, and in 1991 he shared first place in the open chess tournament in San Sebastián.

Zaichik played for Georgia in three Chess Olympiads:

- In 1992, at first reserve board in the 30th Chess Olympiad in Manila (+4, =1, -1),
- In 1994, again as first reserve in the 31st Chess Olympiad in Moscow (+6, =3, -1),
- In 1996, at fourth board in the 32nd Chess Olympiad in Yerevan (+3, =5, -2).

Since 2002, Zaichik has lived in the United States. In 2002, he shared first place with Evgeniy Najer in the U.S. Open and won the Richard Aronow memorial in Philadelphia.
