= Valery Chekhov =

Russian chess grandmaster (born 1955)

Personal information
- Born: November 27, 1955 (age 70) Moscow, Russian SFSR, Soviet Union

Chess career
- Country: Soviet Union → Russia
- Title: Grandmaster (1984)
- FIDE rating: 2457 (October 2026)
- Peak rating: 2550 (January 1992)

Valery Alexandrovich Chekhov (Russian: Валерий Чехов; born 27 November 1955) is a Russian chess grandmaster and former World Junior Chess Champion (1975). In the mid-1980s, Chekhov and his wife (who is also a professional chess player/trainer) were living in DDR and delivering chess training to the DDR-based Soviet military personnel.

He was awarded the International Master title in 1975 and became a Grandmaster in 1984. He was first or tied for first at Lvov 1983, Irkutsk 1983, Barcelona 1984, Dresden 1985, and the Berlin Open 1986.

== Bibliography ==
- Chekhov, Valery (1994). Sizilianisch Sweschnikow-Variante – richtig gespielt (in German). Beyer. ISBN 3-89168-044-9.
