= Alexey Vyzmanavin =

Russian chess grandmaster (1960–2000)

Personal information
- Born: Alexey Borisovich Vyzmanavin; 4 December 1960 Moscow, Russian SFSR, Soviet Union
- Died: 6 January 2000 (aged 39) Moscow, Russia

Chess career
- Country: USSR; Russia
- Title: Grandmaster (1989)
- Peak rating: 2620 (January 1993)
- Peak ranking: No. 29 (January 1991)

Alexey Borisovich Vyzmanavin (sometimes written Vyzhmanavin; Алексе́й Бори́сович Выжмана́вин; 4 December 1960 – 6 January 2000) was a Russian chess Grandmaster.

== Biography ==
During the early part of his career, he regularly played in the Moscow Championships and in 1981, with an Elo rating of 2200, finished sixth, ahead of several strong grandmasters including David Bronstein, Yuri Razuvaev, Artur Yusupov, Alexey Suetin, Rafael Vaganian and Evgeny Vasiukov. He went on to win the event in 1984 and 1986.

Qualifying as a grandmaster in 1989, he went on to tie for first place at the 1990 USSR Championship in Leningrad (the title going to Alexander Beliavsky on tie-break). He placed 5th-9th the following year at the final (58th) Soviet Championship, held in Moscow. These championship successes contributed to his selection for the national team and this included participating at the 1992 Manila Olympiad. Playing reserve board 2, he scored +3 =6 −0, helping the Russian team to the gold medal.

Among his international tournament successes were wins at Nałęczów 1986 and Tashkent 1987. He shared first place at Moscow 1988 (with Razuvaev, Gregory Kaidanov and Lev Psakhis) and won at Sochi 1989 (ahead of Joël Lautier and Alexander Khalifman). There followed his victory at the 1990/91 edition of the Rilton Cup in Stockholm and further success at the Gelsenkirchen 1991 tournament, where he won ahead of Vasily Smyslov. He surprised the chess world at Leon in 1993, by placing second behind tournament victor Leonid Yudasin and thereby restricting Anatoly Karpov to a share of third prize (with Veselin Topalov and Peter Leko).

As a player of rapid and blitz chess, his reputation was that of a 'speed demon', competing at the PCA rapidplay events of the 1990s and frequently outplaying his more illustrious opponents. At the Moscow event in 1994, he reached the semi-final, narrowly losing out to Vladimir Kramnik, having already beaten Alexei Shirov and Viktor Korchnoi. Commentating at one such PCA event, Maurice Ashley described Vyzmanavin in predatory terms—"He's a dangerous one, the V-man, looking like a cat, ready to pounce."

Vyzmanavin's highest Elo rating was 2620 and he ceased playing circa 1997.

Vyzmanavin's early death, aged 40, was officially described as being caused by a heart attack. He lived alone, but had been out with friends in Moscow on 6 January 2000 (the Russian Christmas) and his body was discovered some six days later. There were also reports of poverty and depression. Grandmaster Alexander Baburin believes that there had been serious problems with drinking, which had worsened following the breakdown of his marriage.
