= Bukhuti Gurgenidze =

Georgian chess grandmaster (1933–2008)

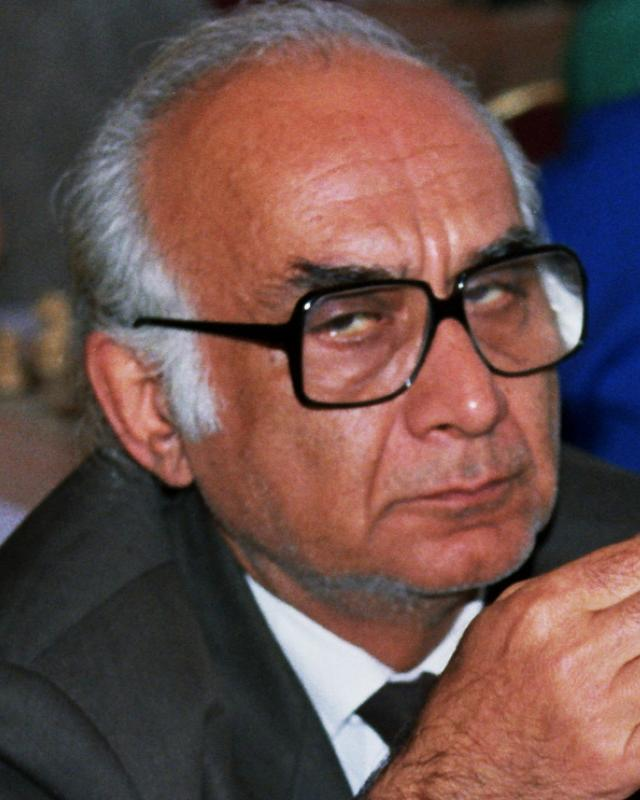
- Gurgenidze in 1995

Personal information
- Born: ბუხუტი გურგენიძე November 13, 1933 Surami, Georgian SSR, Soviet Union
- Died: May 24, 2008 (aged 74)

Chess career
- Country: Georgia
- Title: Grandmaster (1970)
- Peak rating: 2540 (July 1971)
- Peak ranking: No. 39 (July 1971)

Bukhuti (Buchuti) Ivanovich Gurgenidze (Georgian: ბუხუტი გურგენიძე; November 13, 1933 – May 24, 2008) was a Georgian chess Grandmaster, born in Surami, Georgia.

He was a multiple Georgian Champion, and played in eight USSR Chess Championships. He shared first place with Mikhail Tal at Tbilisi in 1969–70 and placed first at Olomouc in 1976. Gurgenidze was a trainer to several women grandmasters in the Soviet Union. He was a geologist by profession.

His name is attached to the Gurgenidze Variation in the Sicilian Defence (1.e4 c5 2.Nf3 Nc6 3. Bb5 g6 4.0-0 Bg7 5.Re1 e5 6.b4) and in the Caro–Kann Gurgenidze Variation: 1.e4 c6 2.d4 d5 3.Nc3 g6; it is because of this variation, originated by Bukhuti Gurgenidze, that 3.Nc3 fell from favour in the 1970s. 3.Nd2 has since been regarded as the accurate way to reach the positions arising from ... dxe4. After 3.Nd2, ... g6 is met by 4.c3, when the fianchettoed bishop has little to do. He also played the original 1.e4 c6 2.d4 d5 3.Nc3 b5!? at least once, in a game he lost against Mikhail Tal. 3...b5 against Caro-Kann is usually referred to as Gurgenidze Variation. Also bearing his name is the Gurgenidze Variation of the Modern Defense, 1.e4 g6 2.d4 Bg7 3.Nc3 c6 4.f4 d5 5.e5 h5.

Gurgenidze was awarded the International Master (IM) title in 1966 and the Grandmaster (GM) title in 1970.
