= Sergey Dolmatov =

Russian chess grandmaster (born 1959)

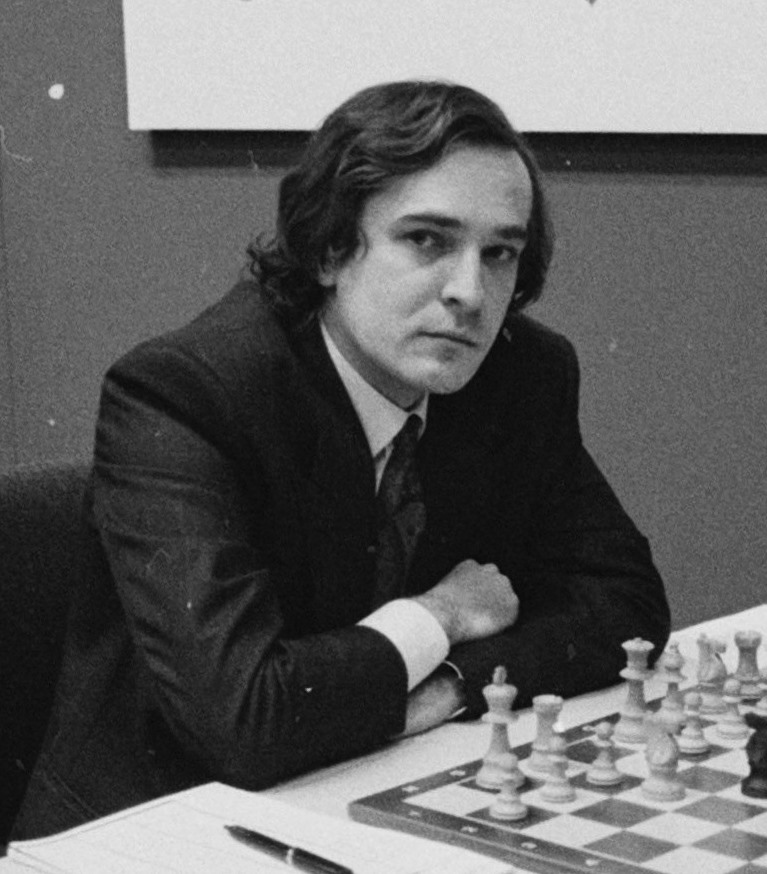
- Dolmatov (1991)

Personal information
- Born: Сергей Долматов; February 20, 1959 (age 67) Kiselyovsk, Soviet Union

Chess career
- Country: Soviet Union → Russia
- Title: Grandmaster (1982)
- FIDE rating: 2560 (October 2026)
- Peak rating: 2630 (July 1993)
- Peak ranking: No. 13 (January 1990)

Sergey Viktorovich Dolmatov (Russian: Сергей Викторович Долматов; born February 20, 1959) is a Russian Grandmaster of chess and former World Junior Chess Champion.

Born in Kiselevsk in the former Soviet Union, Dolmatov's solid yet enterprising style of play was soon to launch him to the forefront of youth chess, culminating in him winning the World Junior Chess Championship in 1978. He was awarded the title of International Master in the same year and became a Grandmaster in 1982.

Along with the titles, the early part of his chess career yielded many international tournament victories, including the Amsterdam Masters 1979, Bucharest 1981, Hradec Kralove 1981, Frunze 1983, Barcelona 1983, as well as the traditional closed Tallinn (Keres Memorial) 1985 and Sochi (Chigorin Memorial) 1988. Also notable was Dolmatov's second place (to Vitaly Tseshkovsky) at Minsk in 1982.

However, as is often the case, such rapid early progress can be difficult to sustain. Despite winning at Hastings (1989–90, then still a major round-robin tournament) as clear first and qualifying as a World Championship candidate from the strong Manila Interzonal of 1990, Dolmatov narrowly failed to convert his 'preliminary round' match against his friend Artur Yusupov the following year. Nevertheless, during this period his Elo rating exceeded 2600 and he managed to maintain this level for the next decade. As the new millennium approached, his frequency of play declined and since 2004, he has been more or less inactive.

There was some success in the latter part of his 'busy' period, notably the Linares Open of 2000, but at the Moscow Aeroflot Open of 2004, Dolmatov famously lost a game to 13-year-old Magnus Carlsen in just 19 moves. Sergey Dolmatov has also been a chess writer in the early part of the 2000s, contributing opening surveys and tournament reports to chess journals such as New In Chess.

As a player of the white pieces, he favours the King (or 'e') pawn openings and as black, shows a preference for the Dutch Defence, King's Indian Defence and French Defence.

In 2007, Dolmatov was awarded the title of FIDE Senior Trainer. Dolmatov currently lives in Moscow and work as a chess coach.
