= Lembit Oll =

Estonian chess player

Personal information
- Born: 23 April 1966 Kohtla-Järve, then part of Estonian SSR, Soviet Union
- Died: 16 May 1999 (aged 33) Tallinn, Estonia

Chess career
- Country: Estonia
- Title: Grandmaster (1990)
- Peak rating: 2650 (July 1998)
- Peak ranking: No. 25 (July 1998)

Lembit Oll (23 April 1966 – 16 May 1999) was an Estonian chess grandmaster.

== Chess career ==
Born in Kohtla-Järve on 23 April 1966, Oll became Estonian Chess Champion in 1982 and U20 Soviet Chess Champion in 1984. FIDE awarded him the international master title in 1983 and the grandmaster title in 1990. From then on, he regularly played for Estonia at the Chess Olympiads and European Team Chess Championships. In July 1998, he reached his highest rating and position on the FIDE world rankings: 2650 and No. 25, respectively. He played his last tournament in 1999 in Nova Gorica, sharing second place.

=== List of victories ===
- 1989: Espoo, Tallinn (zonal tournament), Helsinki.
- 1990: Terrassa.
- 1991: Sydney, Helsinki.
- 1992: Seville.
- 1993: Vilnius, The Hague, Antwerp.
- 1994: New York City Open (shared 1st with Jaan Ehlvest).
- 1995: Helsinki, Riga (zonal tournament).
- 1996: Saint Petersburg.
- 1997: Køge, Szeged (shared 1st), Hoogeveen (shared 1st).

=== Olympiads ===
Oll played for Estonia four times in Chess Olympiads.

- In 1992, at second board at the 30th Olympiad in Manila (+7 –1 =6);
- In 1994, at first board at the 31st Olympiad in Moscow (+3 –2 =8);
- In 1996, at second board at the 32nd Olympiad in Yerevan (+2 –1 =9);
- In 1998, at first board at the 33rd Olympiad in Elista (+1 –0 =7).

== Personal life ==
Oll, who was married and had two sons, fell into depression after his divorce and loss of child custody. He had received mental health treatment since 1996 and was prescribed anti-depressants. He died on 16 May 1999 by falling from a window of his fourth-floor apartment in Tallinn. Despite his personal problems, he was No. 42 on the FIDE world rankings at the time of his death. He was buried at Metsakalmistu cemetery in Tallinn, not far away from the most famous Estonian chess player Paul Keres.
