= Yury Dokhoian =

Russian chess player (1964–2021)

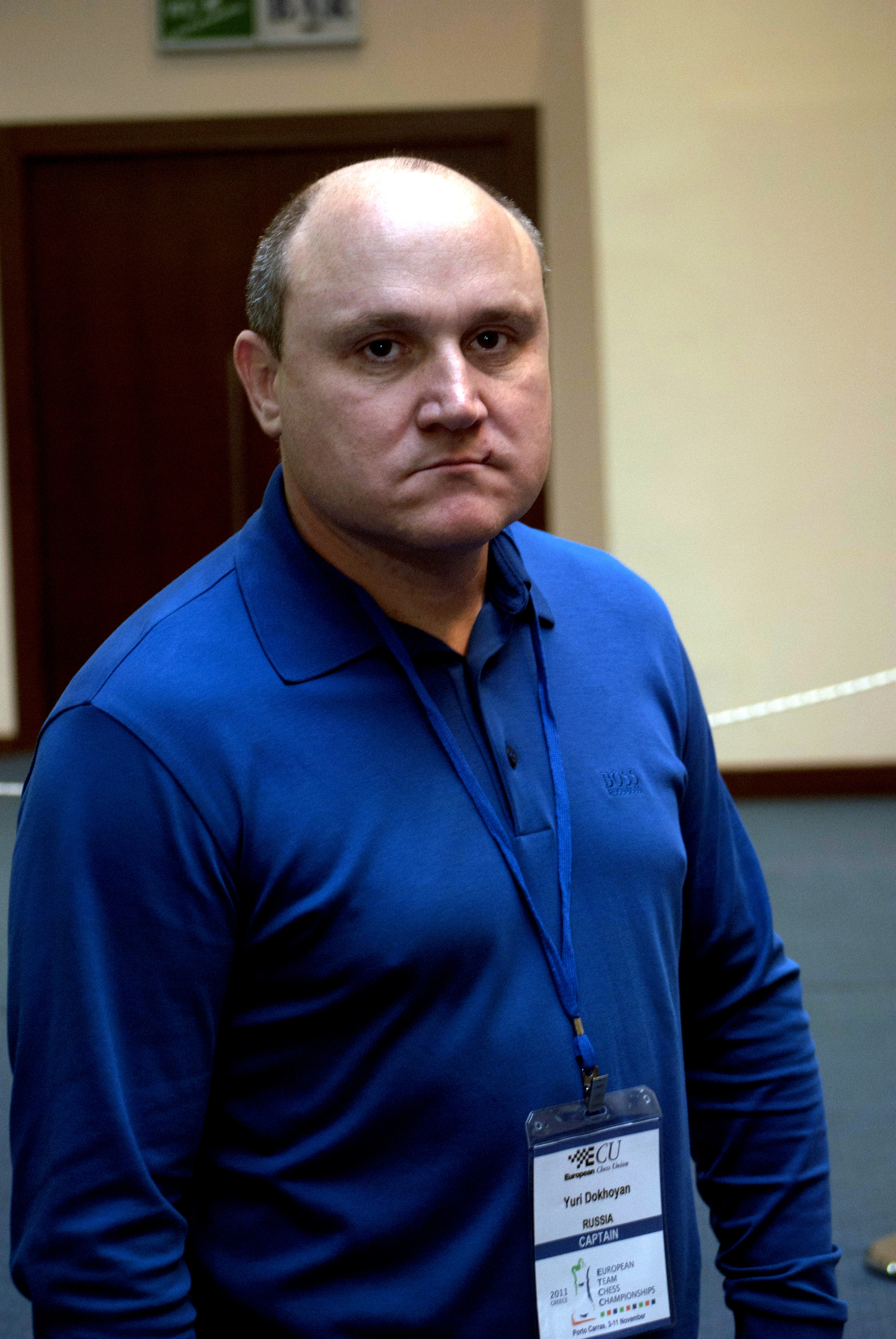
- Yury Dokhoian in Porto Carras in 2011

Personal information
- Born: Юрий Дохоян; 26 October 1964 Altai Krai, Russian SFSR, Soviet Union
- Died: 1 July 2021 (aged 56) Moscow, Russia

Chess career
- Country: Russia
- Title: Grandmaster (1988)
- Peak rating: 2580 (July 1994)
- Peak ranking: No. 83 (July 1994)

Yury Rafaelovich Dokhoian (Russian: Юрий Рафаэлович Дохоян; 26 October 1964 – 1 July 2021) was a Russian Grandmaster of chess (1988) of Armenian origin.

== Career ==
Dokhoian played several times in the first league of the USSR Chess Championship. In 1986, he tied for second place in the All-Union tournament of young masters. He came first in Bucharest 1986, first in Plovdiv 1988, tied for second in Budapest 1988, third behind Smbat Lputian and Lev Psakhis in Yerevan 1988, third in Sochi 1988, tied for first with Friso Nijboer in Wijk aan Zee 1989 and with Yury Piskov in Copenhagen 1991, first in Berlin 1992, first in Bad Godesberg 1993, first in Lublin 1993, first in Bonn 1993, tied for first with Tony Miles in Munster 1993.

According to Chessmetrics, at his peak in February 1989 Dokhoian's play was equivalent to a rating of 2687, and he was ranked number 33 in the world. His best single performance was at Yerevan 1988, where he scored 9 of 13 possible points (69%) against 2598-rated opposition, for a performance rating of 2703.

For many years, Dokhoian was Garry Kasparov's second. In 2009, he started cooperating with Sergey Karjakin, being at the same time the coach of the Russian women's team. He was also the coach of the female world class players, the sisters Tatiana and Nadezhda Kosintseva. In 2007, he was awarded the title of FIDE Senior Trainer.

== Death ==
On 1 July 2021, Dokhoian died in Moscow from COVID-19.
