= Elizbar Ubilava =

Georgian-Spanish chess grandmaster (born 1950)

Personal information
- Born: August 27, 1950 (age 76) Tbilisi, Georgia

Chess career
- Country: Georgia (until 2005); Spain (since 2005)
- Title: Grandmaster (1988)
- Peak rating: 2561 (January 1999)

Elizbar Ubilava (born August 27, 1950 in Tbilisi) is a Spanish chess Grandmaster (1988) of Georgian origin. He is FIDE Senior Trainer (2004) and worked with Viswanathan Anand for nine years between 1994 and 2005. He achieved his highest Elo rating of 2561 in January 1999.

== Chess career ==
Ubilava won the Georgian Chess Championship in 1974 and 1986 and played for Georgia in the 1992 Chess Olympiad. His other successful performances include 1st at Trencianske Teplice 1985, 1st at Eforie Nord 1988, =1st at Tbilisi 1988, 1st at Benasque 2001, 3rd at Elgoibar 2003, =2nd at La Roda 2005, =1st at Benasque 2005 and =1st at Almeria 2008.

He participated in the USSR Chess Championship of 1967 making him one of the youngest participants at the age of 17.

== Notable games ==
- Igor A. Zaitsev vs Elizbar Ubilava, USSR Championship (1967), Sicilian Defense: Smith–Morra Gambit (B21), 0–1
- Vladimir Kramnik vs Elizbar Ubilava, It (active) 1992, Queen's Gambit Declined: Harrwitz Attack (D37), 0–1
