= Yuri Razuvaev =

Russian chess grandmaster (1945–2012)

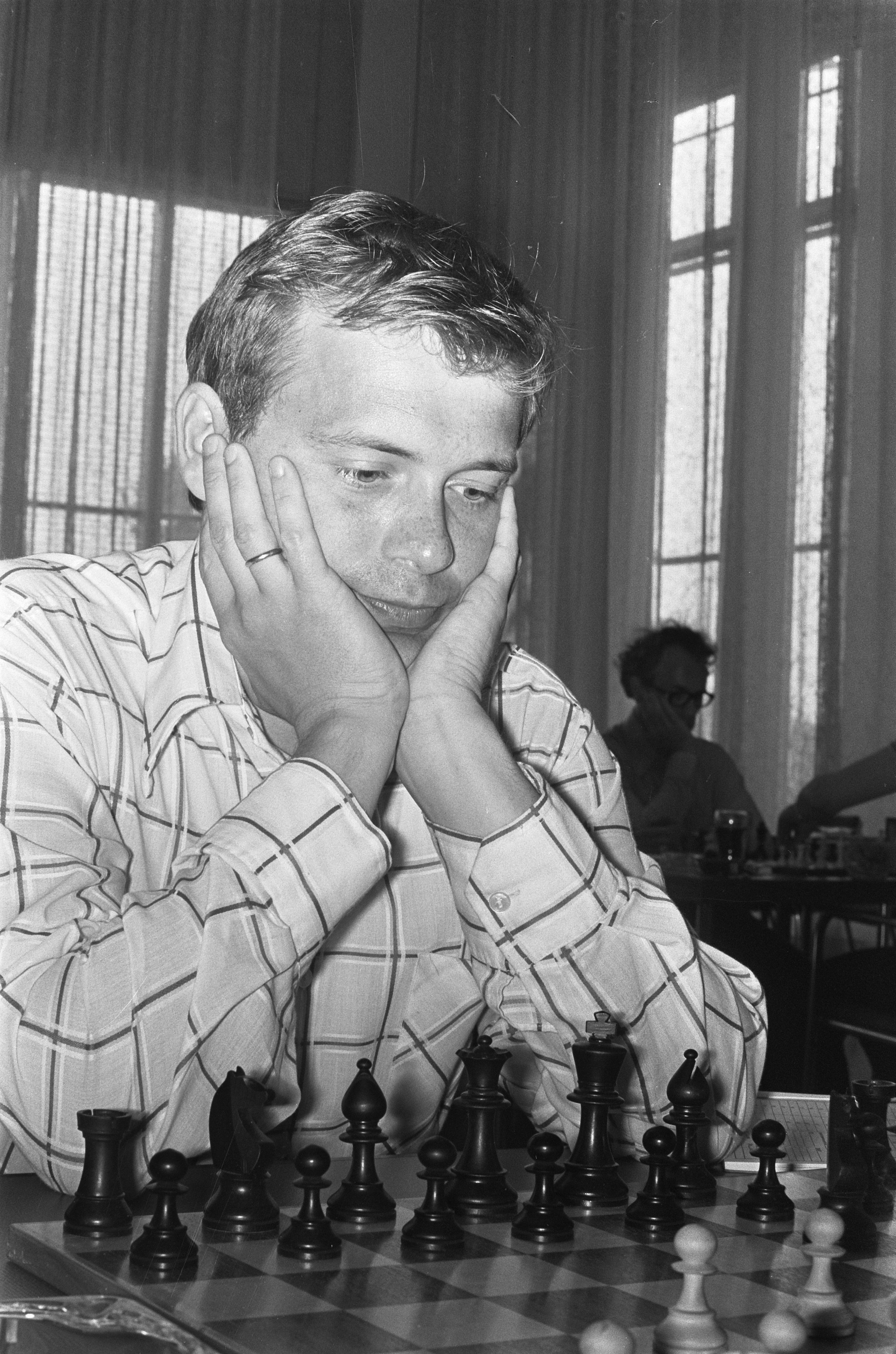
- Yuri Razuvaev in 1975

Personal information
- Born: Юрий Разуваев; 10 October 1945 Moscow, Soviet Union
- Died: 21 March 2012 (aged 66)

Chess career
- Country: Soviet Union → Russia
- Title: Grandmaster (1976)
- Peak rating: 2585 (January 1991)
- Peak ranking: No. 43 (January 1991)

Yuri Sergeyevich Razuvaev Russian: Ю́рий Серге́евич Разува́ев (also Razuvayev; 10 October 1945 – 21 March 2012) was a Russian chess player and trainer.

== Chess career ==
Razuvaev became an International Master in 1973, a Grandmaster in 1976 and an Honoured Coach of Russia in 1977.

Razuvaev's tournament wins included Dubna 1978, Polanica-Zdrój 1979, London 1983, Dortmund 1985, Jūrmala 1987, Pula 1988, Protvino 1988, Reykjavík 1990, Leningrad 1992, Tiraspol 1994, Reggio Emilia 1996 and San Sebastian 1996.

At the second USSR vs Rest of the World match in 1984, he substituted for Tigran Petrosian, who was absent because of illness. Razuvaev limited his opponent, the much higher rated Robert Hübner, to four straight draws.

Razuvaev was a respected trainer, becoming a second to Anatoly Karpov from 1971 until 1978, stepping down before the World Championship match against Viktor Korchnoi. They had first met at the Botvinnik School's first sessions in 1963 He coached Alexandra Kosteniuk, who won the Women's World Chess Championship in 2008, along with Evgeny Tomashevsky along with the Italian national team. In 2005 he was awarded the title of FIDE Senior Trainer.

== Chess strength ==
At his peak, in the July 1991 FIDE list, he had an Elo rating of 2590.

== Notable games ==
- Yuri Razuvaev vs Lev Gutman, URS-ch otbor 1976, Gruenfeld Defense: Exchange, Classical Variation (D86), 1-0
- Yuri Razuvaev vs Zvonimir Mestrovic, Keszthely 1981, Queen's Gambit Accepted: Janowski-Larsen Variation (D25), 1-0
- Yuri Razuvaev vs Efim Geller, USSR 1988, Catalan Opening: Open Defense (E04), 1-0
- Fernando Prada-Rubin vs Yuri Razuvaev, Las Palmas op 1996, Sicilian Defense: Nezhmetdinov-Rossolimo Attack (B31), 0-1

== Publications ==
- Devoted to chess. The creative heritage of Yuri Razuvaev. Compiled by Boris Postovsky. New in Chess, 2019. ISBN 978-90-5691-822-4
