= 1967 USSR Chess Championship =

Soviet chess tournament

35th Soviet Chess Championship
- Location: Kharkov

Champion
- Lev Polugaevsky; Mikhail Tal

The 1967 Soviet Chess Championship was the 35th edition of USSR Chess Championship. Held from 7 December to 26 December 1967 in Tbilisi. The tournament was won by Lev Polugaevsky and Mikhail Tal. For the first time the Soviet Chess Championship was played on a Swiss system organized as a 13 round tournament for 130 players.

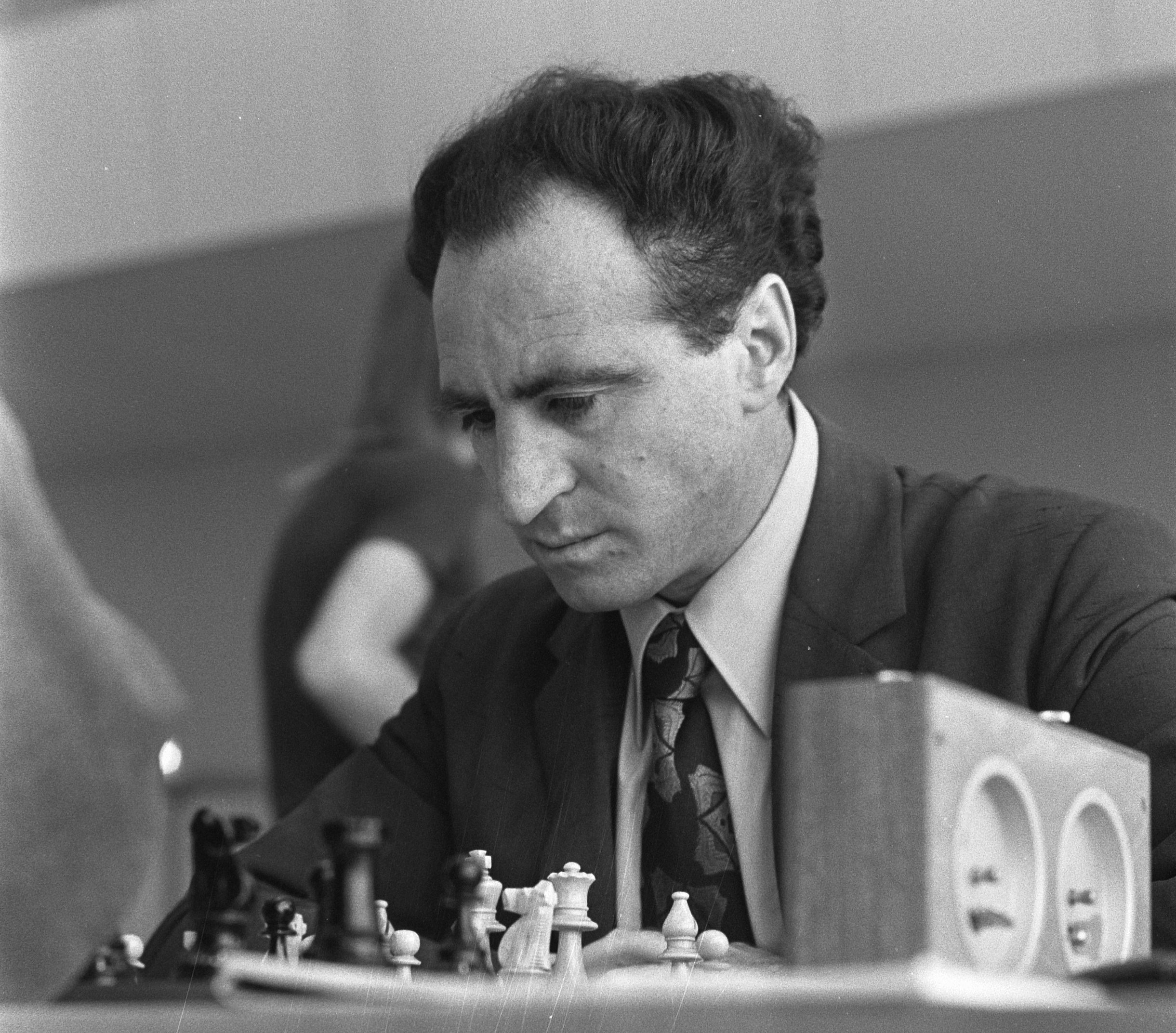
Lev Polugaevsky

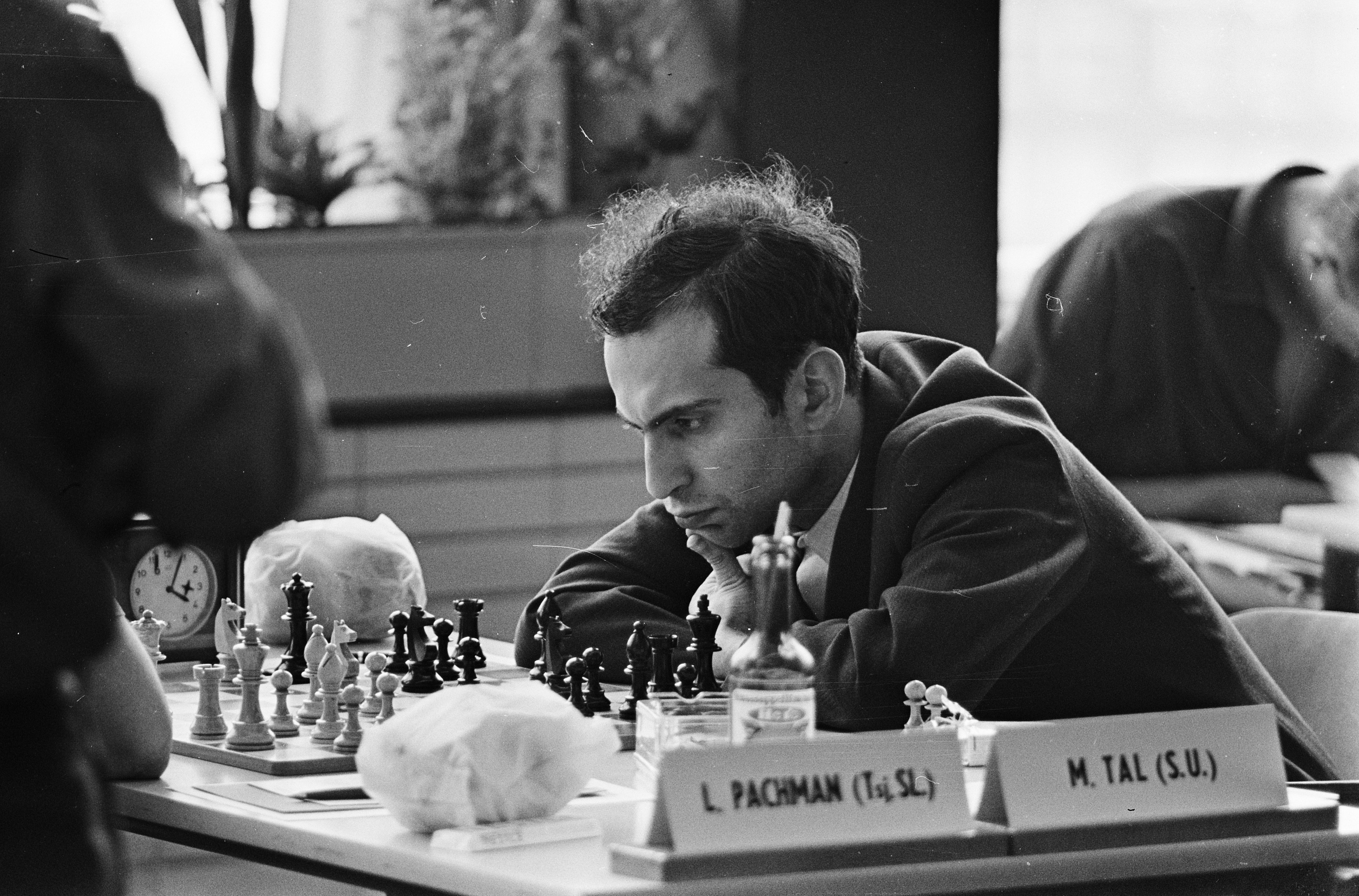
Mikhail Tal

== The Championship ==
The 35th edition was dedicated to the 50th anniversary of the October Revolution. It was decided that a return to mass activity was called for and the experiment of a Swiss system for 130 players over 13 rounds was tried. There were other reasons. 1967 had been a very busy year for the top Soviet players, with major international tournaments in Leningrad and Moscow. Many of them were expected to skip the Soviet Championship to rest, so it seemed a good idea to open things up and see what kind of talent was out there.

The Swiss system experiment, which attracted few of the stars, was not repeated until the dying days of the USSR in 1991. In fact, as early as the first round Lev Polugaevsky was incensed that he had to play such a strong opponent as Lutikov, whereas Mikhail Tal was paired with Hillar Kamer, to whom he had lost in a junior event a decade earlier.

Although 130 players started out in Kharkov, four of them did not finish: Vladimir Simagin withdrew after making 2½/4. Oleg Moiseev left after six rounds with the same score. Nikolai Kopylov went after making ½/5. Finally, Valery Zhidkov was expelled from the event, according to the Swiss Chess Agency report, after scoring 5 points out of nine rounds, for unclear reasons (the chief judge Salo Flohr claimed in his report that there had been no incidents).

Tal dominated from the creative point of view, but Polugaevsky hung on doggedly to share first place. His first-round experience was repeated in the last round when he had to play the strong grandmaster Ratmir Kholmov, whereas Tal had the easier task of meeting Valery Zhuravlyov. Both won, but Polugayevsky's task was clearly the harder. He only broke down Kholmov's resistance in an English Opening after 51 moves. In a sense Polugayevsky had declined a challenge since after the moves 1 d4 Nf6 2 c4 e6 in the penultimate round, Polugaevsky offered a draw to Tal, which was accepted. For the sake of decency, they played another dozen moves, but Tal, as Black, had better reasons to be satisfied with this grandmaster draw.

Flohr praised the creative level of Evgeni Vasiukov games, attributing this to his recent joint study with Korchnoi.

Some future chess stars did make their debuts, such as Lev Alburt, Mark Dvoretsky, Boris Gulko, Gennady Sosonko, Evgeny Sveshnikov and Rafael Vaganian.

== Table and results ==
This is all the information available. No complete crosstable of the event can be found.

35th Soviet Chess Championship
	Player	Rounds and results													Results in unknown rounds	Total
		1	2	3	4	5	6	7	8	9	10	11	12	13		
1	Lev Polugaevsky	+27	+59	=3	+74	=4	=5	+8	=16	+30	+13	=12	=2	+11		10.0
2	Mikhail Tal	+108	+18	+19	=78	=6	=12	=10	+7	+23	=4	+3	=1	+8		10.0
3	Evgeni Vasiukov	+43	+30	=1	=44	+31	+25	-4	+20	+9	+12	-2	=11	+17		9.5
4	Mark Taimanov	+80	+31	+52	=12	=1	+78	+3	=23	=11	=2	=40	=5	+13		9.5
5	Igor Platonov	+76	=93		+11	=78	=1	+45	=12	=40		+23	=4	+20	=33 =42	9.5
6	Yuri Sakharov			+112	+68	=2	=8	=58	-9	-20		+44	+40	+29	+53	9.0
7	Vladimir Antoshin	=107			=25		=11	+83	-2	+29	=34		=20	+26	+15 +30	9.0
8	Valery Zhuravliov		=11		=16	+77	=6	-1	-46				+33	-2	+35 +45 +48 +80 +88	8.5
9	Vladimir Bagirov							+44	+6	-3	+19	-11	=14		-31 +56	8.5
10	Semyon Furman	-44					+54	=2	-30	+58	=14		-13		+34 +37 +70	8.5
11	Ratmir Kholmov	+66	=8	+47	-5	=7	+74	+22	+58	=4	=17	+9	=3	-1		8.5
12	Viktor Zheliandinov	+105	+48	+116	=4	=58	=2	+28	=5	+49	-3	=1	-17	+40		8.5
13	Alexander Zaitsev								+45	+46	-1		+10	-4	=31 +33 +38 +42	8.5
14	Alexander Izvozchikov								+127	=16	=10		=9		+61	8.5
15	Mikhail Steinberg	=92							-33						-7 +24 =40 +56 =64 +78	8.5
16	Viacheslav Osnos	+64		=74	=8	85		+34	=1	=14	-20				+36 +102	8.5
17	Vladimir Tukmakov									+27	=11		+12	-3	+46 +65	8.5
18	Alexander Chistiakov		-2												-27 +49	8.0
19	Eduard Bukhman		+60	-2						+21	-9				-27	8.0
20	Lev Alburt							+78	-3	+6	+16		=7	-5	=33 =35 -115	8.0
21	Vladimir Savon									-19					-33 =37 -38 +52 +70 +75	8.0
22	Alexander Sinyavsky							-11		-44					+94	8.0
23	Anatoly Lein					+53	+58	=40	=4	-2	+44	-5	=36			8.0
24	Oleg Donchenko														-15 +39 +59	8.0
25	Eduard Mnatsakanian				=7		-3						-26		+42 +129	8.0
26	Anatoly Volovich												+25	-7	=126	8.0
27	Anatoly Lutikov	-1				-44				-17					+18 +19 +31 +103	7.5
28	Sergey Krasnov					+32	=44	-12	+92	-33					-46 +102	7.5
29	Vitaly Tseshkovsky									-7				-6	+37 +116	7.5
30	Bukhuti Gurgenidze		-3					+48	+10	-1	=40				-7 +53	7.5
31	Naum Levin		-4			-3									+9 =13 -27 -42 +65	7.5
32	Oleg Pavlenko				=53	-28									+122 -127	7.5
33	Yuri Shilov								+15	+28			-8		=5 -13 =20 +21 -50	7.5
34	Vitaly Tarasov							-16		+107	=7				-10	7.5
35	Gennadi Sosonko														-8 =20 +57 =94	7.5
36	Mark Tseitlin		-102										=23		-16 -54 =70 +78	7.5
37	Alexander Cherepkov														-10 =21 -29 =86	7.5
38	Rashid Nezhmetdinov	-116													-13 +21 +47	7.5
39	Elizbar Ubilava								-40						-24 +64 +93	7.5
40	Gennadi Kuzmin						+65	=23	+39	=5	=30	=4	-6	-12	=15 +41 +122	7.5
41	Vladimir Arseniev														-40	7.0
42	Viacheslav Dydyshko														=5 -13 -25 +31	7.0
43	Samuel Zhukhovitsky	-3													-86 -88 +122	7.0
44	Georgy Borisenko	+10			=3	+27	=28	-9		+22	-23	-6			=55 +127	7.0
45	Yuri Nikolaevsky						85	-5	-13						-8 +49 =70 +77	7.0
46	Vladimir Doroshkievich	=128							+8	-13					-17 +28 =49 -95	7.0
47	Vladas Mikenas			-11											-38 -78 +130	7.0
48	L. Gudim		-12					-30							-8	7.0
49	Janis Klovans								+64	-12					-18-45=46=51=54=67+73-83+84+109+117	7.0
50	Yacov Murey		-58												+33 =70 =78 -103	7.0
51	Oleg Privorotsky														=49	7.0
52	Ilya Mikliaev			-4											-21 +66	7.0
53	Iivo Nei				=32	-23									-6 -30 +93	7.0
54	Rudolf Kimmelfeld						-10								+36 =49 +60 =70	7.0
55	Oleg Chernikov														=44 =70 +71 +120	7.0
56	Evgeny Sveshnikov														-9 -15 =88	7.0
57	Yuri Gusev														-35 +77	7.0
58	Algimantas Butnorius		+50	+102	+65	=12	-23	=6	-11	-10						6.5
59	Yuri Nikitin		-1												-24 -64 =65	6.5
60	Leonid Slutzky		-19												-54 =65	6.5
61	Vanik Zakharian														-14 +88 -129	6.5
62	Roman Pelts														=70 -78	6.5
63	Nikolay Popov															6.5
64	Igor Zaitsev		-16						-49						=15 -39 +59 +72 +109	6.5
65	Mark Dvoretsky				-58		-40								-17 -31 =59 =60 +103	6.5
66	Vladlen Zurakhov	-11													-52 +96	6.5
67	Rafael Vaganian														=49 +94	6.5
68	Dzhemal Beradze				-6											6.5
69	Iosif Slepoy														=70 =88	6.5
70	Anatolijs Šmits														-10-21=36=45=50=54=55=62=69+101+107=109	6.5
71	Valery Zilberstein														-55	6.0
72	Igor Belov														-64 +88	6.0
73	I. Kagan														-49 +108 -128	6.0
74	Valery Korensky		+121	=16	-1		-11								+94	6.0
75	Boris Rumiantsev														-21 =94	6.0
76	Boris Sorokin	-5													=88	6.0
77	Genrikh Chepukaitis					-8									-45 -57	6.0
78	Alexander Shamis		+114	+129	=2	=5	-4	-20							-15 -36 +47 =50 +62	6.0
79	Mikhail Shereshevsky														+88 +111	6.0
80	Vladimir Bykov	-4													-8 =88	6.0
81	Alexander Kremenetsky															6.0
82	Alexander Tuzovsky															6.0
83	Vladimir Alterman							-7							+49 -100	6.0
84	Valery Voloshin														-49	6.0
85	Boris Kalinkin					16	45									6.0
86	V. Kozlov														=37 +43 +94	6.0
87	Khanan Muchnik														=88	6.0
88	Igor Sakovich														-8+43=56-61=69-72=76-79=80=87+106=119+126	6.0
89	Evgeny Gik														=98 -111	5.5
90	E. Karkmazov														-94	5.5
91	E. Belokurov															5.5
92	Boris Gulko	=15							-28							5.5
93	Igor Kalinski		=5												-39 -53 -94	5.5
94	Valentin Kirilov														-22=35-67-74=75-86+90+93+114=119=127	5.5
95	Yuri Kots		-116												+46	5.5
96	Vladimir Muratov														-66	5.5
97	Anton Polikarpov															5.5
98	V. Seleznev														=89	5.5
99	Alexander Vaisman														=128	5.5
100	Vladimir Zagorovsky														+83	5.5
101	N. Razvaliaev														-70	5.5
102	Evgeny Terpugov		+36	-58											-16 -28	5.0
103	Valery Bykov														-27 +50 -65	5.0
104	Roman Levit															5.0
105	Archil Tsereteli	-12														5.0
106	K. Cherskikh														-88	5.0
107	Vladimir Voronov	=7								-34					-70	5.0
108	Hillar Karner	-2													-73	5.0
109	A. Smetanin														-49 -64 =70	5.0
110	V. Sazonov															5.0
111	Tõnu Õim														-79 +89	5.0
112	Helmuth Luik			-6												5.0
113	Robert Seoev															5.0
114	Neron Valiev		-78												-94	4.5
115	Reinhardas Barstatis		-129												+20	4.5
116	Andrey Lukin	+38	+95	-12											-29	4.5
117	Anatoly Noskov														-49	4.5
118	Anatoly Anokhin															4.5
119	V. Vakulenko														=88 =94	4.5
120	Rein Etruk														-55	4.5
121	I. Evelnin		-74													4.0
122	Vladimir Karasev														-32 -40 -43	4.0
123	Valentin Sorokin															4.0
124	Y. Amakov															4.0
125	V. Gureev															3.0
126	M. Varzhapetian														=26 -88	1.5
127	Valery Zhidkov								-14		X	X	X	X	+32 -44 =94 (did not finish)	5/9
128	Vladimir Simagin	=46				X	X	X	X	X	X	X	X	X	+73 =99 (did not finish)	2.5/4
129	Oleg Moiseev	+115		-78				X	X	X	X	X	X	X	-25 +61 (did not finish)	2.5/6
130	Nikolai Kopilov						X	X	X	X	X	X	X	X	-47 (did not finish)	0.5/5
