= 1969 USSR Chess Championship =

Soviet chess tournament

37th Soviet Chess Championship
- Location: Moscow

Champion
- Tigran Petrosian

The 1969 Soviet Chess Championship was the 37th edition of USSR Chess Championship. Held from 7 September to 12 October 1969 in Moscow. The tournament was won by Tigran Petrosian who defeats Lev Polugaevsky in a play-off match. The final were preceded by semifinals events at Barnaul, Kiev, Rostov-on-Don and Voronezh. This Championship saw a return to a strong event with the unprecedented entry of 23 players. Petrosian made a come-back after having lost his world title to Spassky in June. A big surprise in the semifinals was the failure of David Bronstein to qualify from the Kiev event.

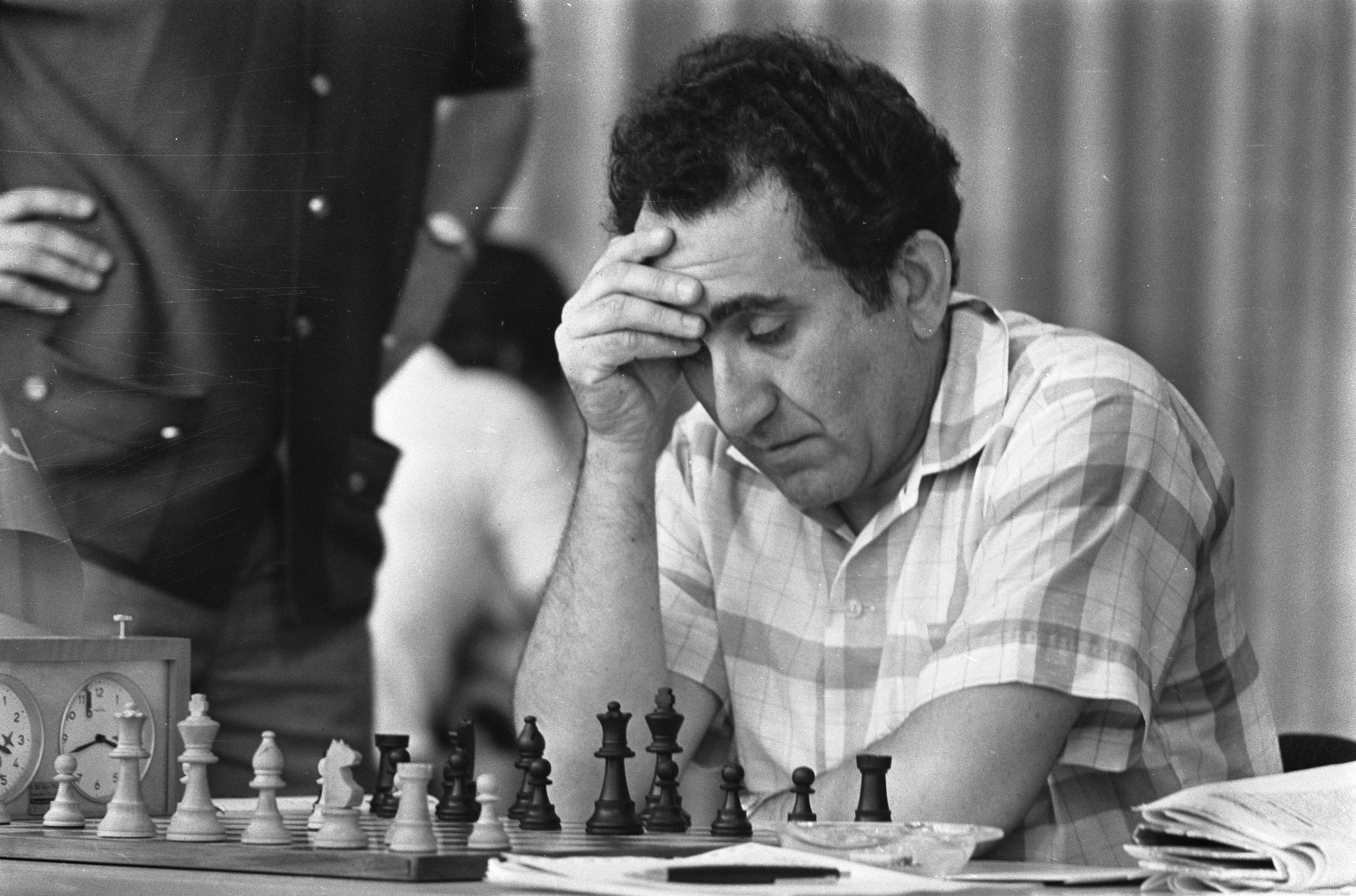
Tigran Petrosian

== Table and results ==
37th Soviet Chess Championship
| | Player | 1 | 2 | 3 | 4 | 5 | 6 | 7 | 8 | 9 | 10 | 11 | 12 | 13 | 14 | 15 | 16 | 17 | 18 | 19 | 20 | 21 | 22 | 23 | Total |
|---|---|---|---|---|---|---|---|---|---|---|---|---|---|---|---|---|---|---|---|---|---|---|---|---|---|
| 1 | (Soviet Union) Tigran Petrosian | - | ½ | ½ | ½ | ½ | ½ | ½ | ½ | ½ | 1 | ½ | ½ | ½ | ½ | ½ | 1 | 1 | ½ | 1 | 1 | ½ | 1 | ½ | 14 |
| 2 | (Soviet Union) Lev Polugaevsky | ½ | - | ½ | ½ | ½ | ½ | 1 | ½ | ½ | ½ | 1 | 1 | 1 | 1 | ½ | ½ | 1 | 1 | ½ | ½ | ½ | 0 | ½ | 14 |
| 3 | (Soviet Union) Efim Geller | ½ | ½ | - | ½ | 1 | ½ | 0 | ½ | ½ | 1 | 0 | 0 | 1 | ½ | ½ | ½ | 1 | 1 | 1 | 1 | ½ | ½ | 1 | 13½ |
| 4 | (Soviet Union) Vassily Smyslov | ½ | ½ | ½ | - | ½ | 1 | 0 | ½ | ½ | ½ | ½ | ½ | 1 | 1 | 1 | ½ | ½ | ½ | 1 | ½ | 1 | ½ | ½ | 13½ |
| 5 | (Soviet Union) Mark Taimanov | ½ | ½ | 0 | ½ | - | ½ | 1 | ½ | 1 | 1 | ½ | ½ | ½ | 1 | ½ | ½ | ½ | 1 | 1 | ½ | ½ | ½ | ½ | 13½ |
| 6 | (Soviet Union) Leonid Stein | ½ | ½ | ½ | 0 | ½ | - | ½ | ½ | ½ | ½ | ½ | 1 | 1 | ½ | ½ | 1 | ½ | ½ | ½ | ½ | ½ | 1 | 1 | 13 |
| 7 | (Soviet Union) Igor Platonov | ½ | 0 | 1 | 1 | 0 | ½ | - | 0 | ½ | 1 | ½ | 0 | 0 | 1 | 0 | ½ | 1 | 1 | ½ | 1 | 1 | ½ | 1 | 12½ |
| 8 | (Soviet Union) Yuri Balashov | ½ | ½ | ½ | ½ | ½ | ½ | 1 | - | ½ | ½ | ½ | ½ | ½ | 1 | ½ | ½ | 1 | 0 | 0 | ½ | 1 | 1 | ½ | 12½ |
| 9 | (Soviet Union) Ratmir Kholmov | ½ | ½ | ½ | ½ | 0 | ½ | ½ | ½ | - | ½ | ½ | ½ | 1 | 0 | ½ | ½ | 1 | ½ | ½ | 1 | 1 | 1 | ½ | 12½ |
| 10 | (Soviet Union) Vladimir Savon | 0 | ½ | 0 | ½ | 0 | ½ | 0 | ½ | ½ | - | ½ | ½ | ½ | 1 | 1 | 1 | 1 | ½ | ½ | 0 | 1 | 1 | 1 | 12 |
| 11 | (Soviet Union) Aivars Gipslis | ½ | 0 | 1 | ½ | ½ | ½ | ½ | ½ | ½ | ½ | - | 1 | ½ | ½ | ½ | ½ | 0 | 1 | 1 | ½ | ½ | ½ | ½ | 12 |
| 12 | (Soviet Union) Orest Averkin | ½ | 0 | 1 | ½ | ½ | 0 | 1 | ½ | ½ | ½ | 0 | - | ½ | ½ | ½ | 1 | ½ | 0 | ½ | ½ | ½ | 1 | 1 | 11½ |
| 13 | (Soviet Union) Samuel Zhukhovitsky | ½ | 0 | 0 | 0 | ½ | 0 | 1 | ½ | 0 | ½ | ½ | ½ | - | ½ | 1 | ½ | ½ | ½ | ½ | ½ | 1 | 1 | 1 | 11 |
| 14 | (Soviet Union) Mikhail Tal | ½ | 0 | ½ | 0 | 0 | ½ | 0 | 0 | 1 | 0 | ½ | ½ | ½ | - | ½ | 1 | ½ | 1 | 1 | ½ | 1 | 0 | 1 | 10½ |
| 15 | (Soviet Union) Vladimir Liberzon | ½ | ½ | ½ | 0 | ½ | ½ | 1 | ½ | ½ | 0 | ½ | ½ | 0 | ½ | - | ½ | ½ | 0 | 1 | ½ | ½ | ½ | 1 | 10½ |
| 16 | (Soviet Union) Evgeni Vasiukov | 0 | ½ | ½ | ½ | ½ | 0 | ½ | ½ | ½ | 0 | ½ | 0 | ½ | 0 | ½ | - | ½ | 1 | ½ | ½ | 1 | 0 | 1 | 9½ |
| 17 | (Soviet Union) Eduard Gufeld | 0 | 0 | 0 | ½ | ½ | ½ | 0 | 0 | 0 | 0 | 1 | ½ | ½ | ½ | ½ | ½ | - | 1 | ½ | ½ | ½ | ½ | 1 | 9 |
| 18 | (Soviet Union) Alexander Zaitsev | ½ | 0 | 0 | ½ | 0 | ½ | 0 | 1 | ½ | ½ | 0 | 1 | ½ | 0 | 1 | 0 | 0 | - | 1 | ½ | ½ | 1 | 0 | 9 |
| 19 | (Soviet Union) Anatoly Lutikov | 0 | ½ | 0 | 0 | 0 | ½ | ½ | 1 | ½ | ½ | 0 | ½ | ½ | 0 | 0 | ½ | ½ | 0 | - | 1 | ½ | 1 | 1 | 9 |
| 20 | (Soviet Union) Igor Zaitsev | 0 | ½ | 0 | ½ | ½ | ½ | 0 | ½ | 0 | 1 | ½ | ½ | ½ | ½ | ½ | ½ | ½ | ½ | 0 | - | ½ | 1 | 0 | 9 |
| 21 | (Soviet Union) Vladimir Tukmakov | ½ | ½ | ½ | 0 | ½ | ½ | 0 | 0 | 0 | 0 | ½ | ½ | 0 | 0 | ½ | 0 | ½ | ½ | ½ | ½ | - | ½ | 1 | 7½ |
| 22 | (Soviet Union) Semyon Furman | 0 | 1 | ½ | ½ | ½ | 0 | ½ | 0 | 0 | 0 | ½ | 0 | 0 | 1 | ½ | 1 | ½ | 0 | 0 | 0 | ½ | - | 0 | 7 |
| 23 | (Soviet Union) Viktor Kupreichik | ½ | ½ | 0 | ½ | ½ | 0 | 0 | ½ | ½ | 0 | ½ | 0 | 0 | 0 | 0 | 0 | 0 | 1 | 0 | 1 | 0 | 1 | - | 6½ |

=== Play-off ===
Moscow Central Chess Club, 19-29 January 1970
| Player | 1 | 2 | 3 | 4 | 5 | Total |
|---|---|---|---|---|---|---|
| (Soviet Union) Tigran Petrosian | 1 | ½ | ½ | 1 | ½ | 3½ |
| (Soviet Union) Lev Polugaevsky | 0 | ½ | ½ | 0 | ½ | 1½ |
