= Igor Platonov =

Soviet chess player (1934–1994)

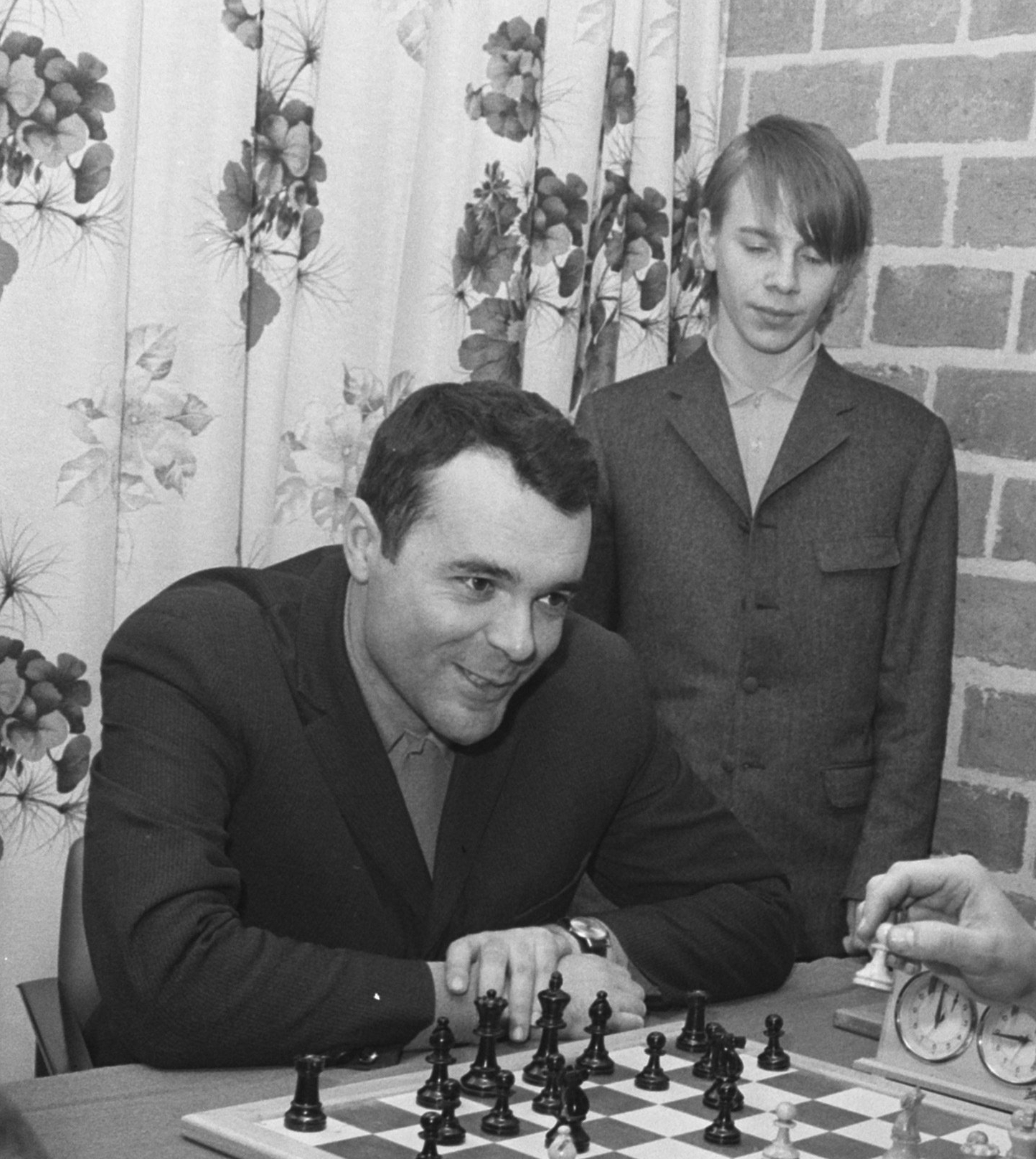
- Igor Platonov and Ulf Andersson, Wijk aan Zee 1970

Personal information
- Born: January 18, 1934 Odesa, Soviet Union
- Died: November 13, 1994 (aged 60) Kyiv, Ukraine

Chess career
- Country: Soviet Union (until 1991); Ukraine (after 1991)

Igor Platonov (January 18, 1934 – November 13, 1994) was a Soviet Ukrainian chess player. He was active between 1958 and 1984, with his best years from 1967 to 1972, when he earned the title of Grandmaster of the Soviet Union (Гроссмейстер СССР). He was the only player to obtain the Title of Soviet Grandmaster not to obtain the International Grandmaster title. Top tournament results included a tie for first in the Kiev Championship of 1963, a tied 3rd-4th place in the very strong 1964 Trade Union Championship, a tied 7th-9th place in the 1969 Soviet Zonal at Moscow, and 2nd place in the José Raúl Capablanca Memorial tournament, Cienfuegos 1972. He played in five straight Soviet finals from 1967 to 1971. After his active career, he became a chess trainer.

== Biography ==
Platonov was born in 1934 in Odessa, in the Ukrainian Soviet Socialist Republic of the USSR. Before he started to be interested in chess, he was an engineer. In 1958, at age 24, Platonov began tournament play. He was active from 1958 to 1984, when he became a chess trainer. Platonov is also said to be a philatelist; however, this is unclear. On November 13, 1994, he was murdered in his Kyiv apartment by two thieves. The identities of the killers remain unknown.

== Chess results ==
Platonov first made a significant mark in competitive chess in 1958, when at age 24 he posted an even score of 6½/13 in the Kiev Championship to tie 8th-9th places; the winner was Yuri Nikolaevsky. Later that same year, he scored 6.5/16 in the Ukrainian Championship at Kiev for 11th place; the winner was Efim Geller.

In the Spartak Club Championship, Minsk 1962, Platonov scored 8/17 for a tied 11th-13th place; the winner was Anatoly Bannik. He finished equal first at the 1963 Kiev Championship with Efrim Lazarev, on 9.5/14. In the Ukrainian Championship, Kiev 1963, he scored 8/17 for a tied 13th-14th place, as Nikolaevsky won again. At the 1964 Trade Union Championship in Moscow, there were nine players who eventually became grandmasters in the field, and Platonov scored 9/15 for a share of 3rd-4th place, as the winner was World Champion Tigran Petrosian.

Platonov qualified for his first Soviet final at Kharkov 1967 (35th Soviet championship), where the event was run on a Swiss format with more than 100 players. He finished well above the middle of the field; the winners were Mikhail Tal and Lev Polugaevsky. His performance was good enough to make the team for the USSR's match against Bulgaria, at Sofia 1967. Platonov also played for the USSR against Yugoslavia, Sochi 1968, scoring 1.5/4. In the 36th Soviet final at Alma Ata 1968, he scored 6.5/19 for 18th place, as Polugaevsky and Alexander Zaitsev won.

Platonov made his career best score in a Soviet final in the 1969 Zonal at Moscow (URS-ch37), where he finished with 12.5/22, to tie for 7th-9th places; the winners were Petrosian and Polugaevsky. He missed qualifying for the Interzonal by one point.

He got his first international tournament opportunity at Wijk aan Zee 1970, but finished 5.5/15 for a tied 12th-13th place, as Mark Taimanov won. He had to qualify for the next Soviet final, and was successful at Kiev 1970. In the final at Riga 1970 (URS-ch38), he finished 20th with 7.5/21, as Viktor Korchnoi won. Another successful qualification from Novosibirsk 1971 earned his place for the final at Leningrad 1971 (URS-ch39), where he finished with 10/21 for equal 12th-13th place, as Vladimir Savon won.

Platonov's next international chance was the José Raúl Capablanca Memorial at Cienfuegos 1972, where he had one of his best career results, placing second with 13/19, behind only Anatoly Lein. This finish, together with his 1969 Soviet Championship result, earned him the Soviet Union Grandmaster title.

After that, he appeared less frequently in top events, his results declined, and he did not manage to make another Soviet final, despite several attempts. His last high-class competitive games on file are from 1984.

Platonov broadened his opening repertoire in the late 1960s, and this led to greater success. He favoured the Sicilian Defence as Black against 1.e4. He opened mainly with 1.e4 early in his career, but added closed games such as the Reti Opening as he matured, with success. Platonov scored wins over top Soviet players such as Mikhail Tal, Vasily Smyslov, Efim Geller, Leonid Stein, Vladimir Savon, Ratmir Kholmov, and Evgeni Vasiukov.

There is a selection of 230 of his games at chessgames.com; chessbase.com has 325 of his games, while mychess.com has 373 Platonov games.

== See also ==
- List of unsolved murders (1980–1999)

== Notable chess games ==
- Igor Platonov vs Lev Alburt, USSR Championship, Kharkov 1967, Reti Opening (A04), 1-0 Platonov shows off his new positional style in his first Soviet final.
- Igor Platonov vs Ratmir Kholmov, USSR Championship, Kharkov 1967, Queen's Indian Defence (E14), 1-0 Platonov takes off one of the top Soviet defensive players.
- Mikhail Tal vs Igor Platonov, USSR Championship, Alma Ata 1968, Sicilian Defence, Najdorf Variation (B95), 0-1 Former World Champion Tal has to tip over his King.
- Igor Platonov vs Vladimir Savon, USSR 1968, Pirc Defence (B07), 1-0 A very attractive 24-move miniature.
- Igor Platonov vs Vasily Smyslov, USSR Championship, Moscow 1969, English Opening (A17), 1-0 A player knows he has arrived near the top when he can win in the strategic English against former World Champion Smyslov.
- Igor Platonov vs Efim Geller, USSR Championship, Moscow 1969, Two Knights' Defence (C59), 1-0 Fellow Ukrainian Geller, a strong tactician and many-time Candidate, gets outgunned in a sharp variation.
- Igor Platonov vs Leonid Stein, USSR Championship, Riga 1970, King's Indian Defence, Saemisch Variation (E80), 1-0 Stein was as dangerous an attacker as there was in the world during this era.
- Igor Platonov vs Jan Hein Donner, Cienfuegos 1972, Catalan Opening, Open Variation (E05), 1-0 One of his best games from his strongest international performance.
