= Abram Zamikhovsky =

Ukrainian chess player

Abram Davidovich Zamikhovsky
- Born: 5 January 1908
- Died: 1978 (aged 69–70)
- Known for: Chess master

Abram Davidovich Zamikhovsky (Zamikhovski) (Russian: Абрам Давидович Замиховский; 5 January 1908 – 1978) was a Ukrainian chess master and former national champion. Never a chess professional, he was also a well-known medical doctor.

In 1931, he won the 6th Ukrainian Championship in Kharkiv ahead of Vsevolod Rauzer and took 14th in the 7th USSR Championship in Moscow (Mikhail Botvinnik won). At that time, he was a student of medical faculty at the Kyiv University. In 1936, he took 8th in the 16th Championship of Moscow. In 1938, he took 2nd, behind Isaac Boleslavsky, in Kyiv (10th UKR-ch).

After World War II, Zamikhovsky took 10th at Kyiv 1946 (15th UKR-ch, Anatoly Bannik won); tied for 9–10th at Kyiv 1947 (16th UKR-ch, Alexey Sokolsky won); shared 1st at Kyiv 1951 (USSR-ch, qf); took 14th at Leningrad 1952 (USSR-ch, sf); won at Kyiv 1952 (USSR-ch, qf); tied for 8–10th at Vilnius 1953 (USSR-ch, sf); in 1955, he tied for in Kyiv (24th UKR-ch, Anatoly Bannik won). In 1956, he took 5th in Kyiv (25th UKR-ch, Isaac Lipnitsky won). In 1957, he took 8th in Kyiv (26th UKR-ch, Efim Geller won).
