= Yuri Nikolaevsky =

Russian chess player

Yuri V Nikolaevsky

Personal information
- Born: February 13, 1937
- Died: 2004 (aged 66–67)

Yuri V Nikolaevsky (Ukrainian: Юрій Васильович Ніколаєвський, romanized: Yurii Vasylovych Nikolaievskyi; 14 February 1937 – 2004) was a Ukrainian chess player. He won the Ukrainian Chess Championship three times (1963, 1967 (jointly), and 1977), and represented the Soviet Union three times in international student team competition, winning a total of four medals. He was of Grandmaster strength at his peak in the early 1960s, but never received an international chess title due to lack of opportunities to play internationally. He played in three Soviet finals (1966, 1967, 1971).

== Biography ==
Nikolaevsky made his first important chess result when he won the 1958 Kyiv Championship with 9.5/13 ahead of a strong field. This qualified him for the Ukrainian Chess Championship at Kyiv later that same year, where he scored 8/16 to finish 10th; the winner was Efim Geller. These two strong performances earned selection to the Soviet student team for the 1958 Student Olympiad at Varna, where he scored 1.5/3 on the second reserve board, and contributed to the team's gold medal win.

He placed second in the 1959 Ukrainian Chess Championship at Kyiv with 16/21, as Geller won again. Another appearance at the 1959 Student Olympiad at Budapest went exceptionally well as he scored 8/10 on board four, earning the board gold medal, and the Soviet team won silver. He scored 9.5/16 in the semi-final of the 1960 Ukrainian Chess Championship at Kyiv, as Anatoly Bannik won. He held down board four at the 1960 Student Olympiad at Leningrad, scoring 5.5/9, as the Soviets won team silver.

Nikolaevsky won his first Ukrainian Chess Championship in 1963 at Kyiv with 11/17. He repeated this success in 1967 at Kyiv, tied with Valery Zhidkov, and won this title for the third time in 1977 at Zhytomyr. He represented Ukraine in two team matches against Bulgaria, in 1962 at Kyiv where he scored 2/2, and again in 1968 at Odesa where he scored 1/1.

He qualified for his first Soviet final at Tbilisi 1966, where he struggled with only 7.5/20, as fellow Ukrainian Leonid Stein won. An excellent performance in the 1967 Soviet Team Championship at Moscow saw him post 7/9. He played in the Soviet final that year at Kharkiv, which had a Swiss format and over 100 players; the winners were Mikhail Tal and Lev Polugaevsky. His final Soviet final appearance was at Leningrad 1971, where he scored 8.5/21, as Vladimir Savon won.

Nikolaevsky got his sole chance at an individual international tournament at Varna 1968, where he tied 4th-5th places with 8/14, while Yuri Sakharov won. He retired from most high-level competitive play after 1978, but played in the Igor Platonov Memorial tournament at Kyiv 1995, an event won by Yuri Kruppa.

Chessmetrics.com, a site which ranks historical chess performances, ranks Nikolaevsky as high as 38th in the world, with a rating of 2634, in early 1960. This is Grandmaster territory. There is a selection of 105 of his games at ChessGames.com.
