= 1956 USSR Chess Championship =

Soviet chess tournament

23rd Soviet Chess Championship (1956)
- Location: Leningrad

Champion
- Mark Taimanov

The 1956 Soviet Chess Championship was the 23rd edition of the USSR Chess Championship, held from 10 January to 15 February 1956 in Leningrad. The tournament was won by Mark Taimanov, who defeated Boris Spassky and Yuri Averbakh in a play-off. The finals were preceded by semifinal events in Leningrad, Moscow and Riga. This edition marked the debut of future world champion Mikhail Tal, often described as "the Magician from Riga". Tal demonstrated his adventurous tactical style, notably in the third round against Vladimir Simagin, who lost a game to Tal and later wondered about the soundness of the piece sacrifice that had defeated him.

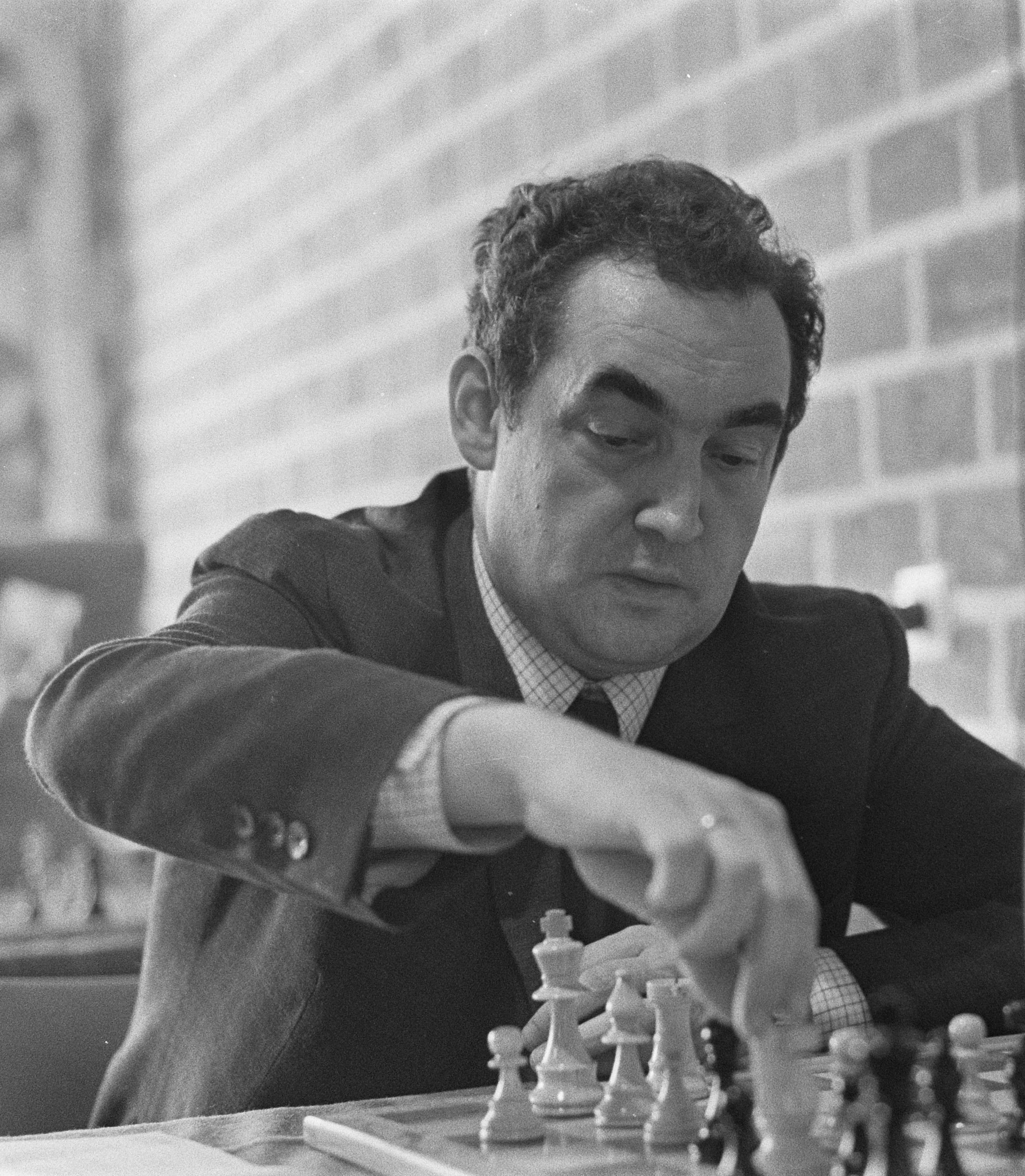
Mark Taimanov

== Table and results ==
23rd Soviet Chess Championship (1956)
	Player	1	2	3	4	5	6	7	8	9	10	11	12	13	14	15	16	17	18	Total
1	(Soviet Union) Mark Taimanov	-	0	½	½	1	½	½	1	1	1	½	0	1	1	½	1	1	½	11½
2	(Soviet Union) Boris Spassky	1	-	1	0	½	1	½	1	½	½	½	1	½	½	½	1	½	1	11½
3	(Soviet Union) Yuri Averbakh	½	0	-	½	1	½	½	½	½	1	½	½	½	1	1	1	1	1	11½
4	(Soviet Union) Viktor Korchnoi	½	1	½	-	1	½	½	½	1	½	1	0	1	1	½	½	½	½	11
5	(Soviet Union) Lev Polugaevsky	0	½	0	0	-	½	½	1	1	1	1	½	1	½	1	0	1	1	10½
6	(Soviet Union) Mikhail Tal	½	0	½	½	½	-	½	½	0	½	1	1	1	½	1	½	1	1	10½
7	(Soviet Union) Ratmir Kholmov	½	½	½	½	½	½	-	0	½	1	1	½	1	1	½	1	½	½	10½
8	(Soviet Union) Isaac Boleslavsky	0	0	½	½	0	½	1	-	½	½	½	1	½	0	½	1	1	1	9
9	(Soviet Union) Vladlen Zurakhov	0	½	½	0	0	1	½	½	-	½	½	0	1	½	1	1	½	½	8½
10	(Soviet Union) Vladimir Antoshin	0	½	0	½	0	½	0	½	½	-	½	0	1	½	1	1	1	½	8
11	(Soviet Union) Anatoly Bannik	½	½	½	0	0	0	0	½	½	½	-	1	0	½	1	½	½	1	7½
12	(Soviet Union) Viacheslav Ragozin	1	0	½	1	½	0	½	0	1	1	0	-	0	½	0	0	0	1	7
13	(Soviet Union) Vladimir Simagin	0	½	½	0	0	0	0	½	0	0	1	1	-	1	½	½	0	1	6½
14	(Soviet Union) Vasily Byvshev	0	½	0	0	½	½	0	1	½	½	½	½	0	-	0	1	1		6½
15	(Soviet Union) Alexander Tolush	½	½	0	½	0	0	½	½	0	0	0	1	½	1	-	0	1	½	6½
16	(Soviet Union) Georgy Borisenko	0	0	0	½	1	½	0	0	0	0	½	1	½	0	1	-	½	½	6
17	(Soviet Union) Abram Khasin	0	½	0	½	0	0	½	0	½	0	½	1	1	0	0	½	-	½	5½
18	(Soviet Union) Georgy Lisitsin	½	0	0	½	0	0	½	0	½	½	0	0	0		½	½	½	-	4

=== Play-off ===
Moscow, February 1956
	Player	1	2	3	Total
1	(Soviet Union) Mark Taimanov	--	½ ½	1 1	3
2	(Soviet Union) Yuri Averbakh	½ ½	--	½ 1	2½
3	(Soviet Union) Boris Spassky	0 0	½ 0	--	0½

Averbakh won the second game against Spassky by walkover since Spassky could not play due to illness.
