= Dimitri Komarov =

Ukrainian chess grandmaster (born 1968)

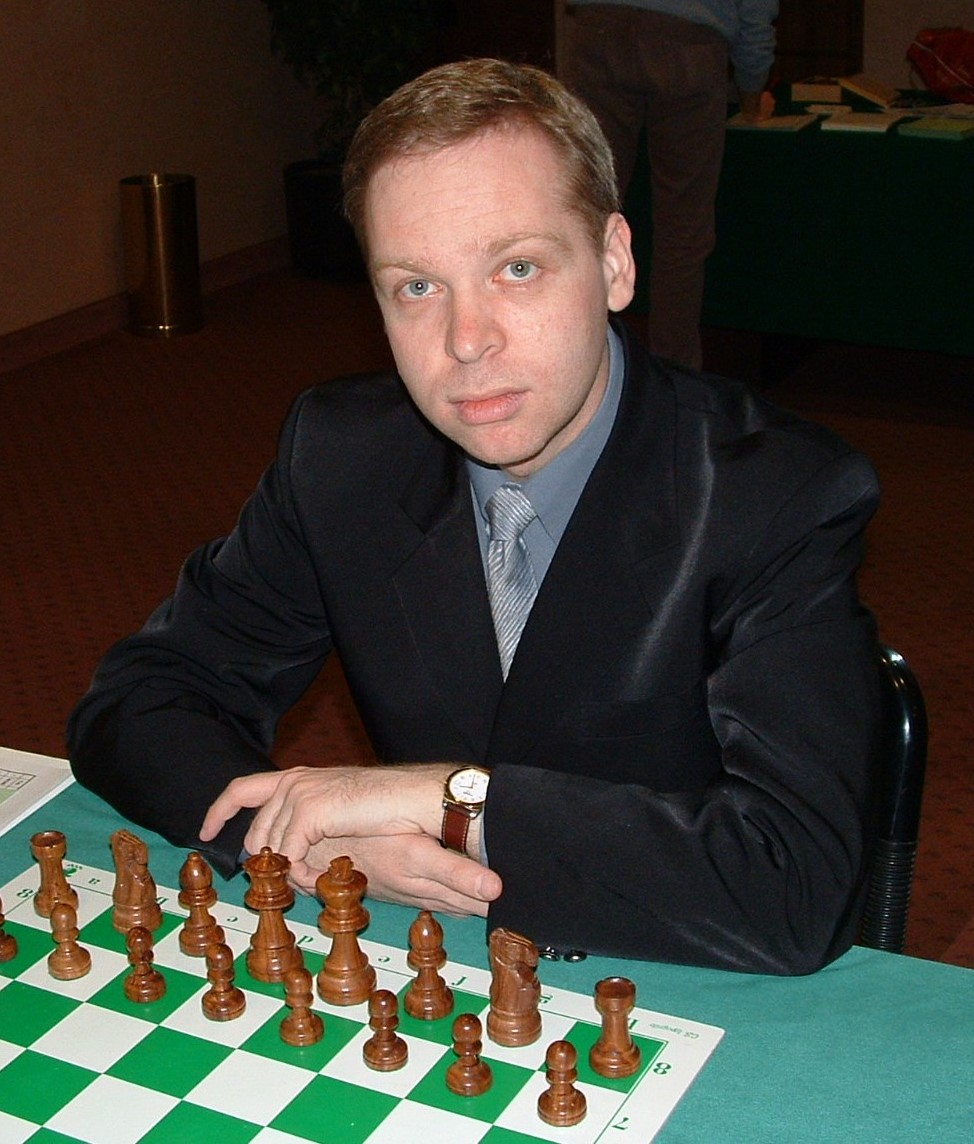
- Komarov at Reggio Emilia in 2003

Personal information
- Born: 1 December 1968 (age 57) Kyiv, Ukrainian SSR, Soviet Union

Chess career
- Country: Ukraine
- Title: Grandmaster (1994)
- Peak rating: 2615 (January 1997)
- Peak ranking: No. 45 (January 1997)

Dimitri Komarov (Ukrainian: Дмитро Комаров) born 1 December 1968) is a Ukrainian chess grandmaster (1994). He was the Ukrainian Chess Champion in 1983.

== Chess career ==
Born in 1968, he won the Ukrainian Chess Championship in 1983, sharing first with Valeriy Neverov. Komarov earned his international master title in 1990 and his grandmaster title in 1994. He won the Reggio Emilia chess tournament of 1997–98. He is the No. 46 ranked Ukrainian player as of June 2020. He coached Indian grandmaster Nihal Sarin from 2013 to 2019.
