= Yuri Sakharov =

Ukrainian Chess Master (1922–1981)

Yuri Nikolaevich Sakharov (Ukrainian: Ю́рій Микола́йович Са́харов)

Yuri Nikolaevich Sakharov (Ukrainian: Ю́рій Микола́йович Са́харов; 18 September 1922 – 26 September 1981) was a Ukrainian Chess Master (1958), International Correspondence Chess Master (1971), and Merited Coach of the Ukrainian SSR (1963).

== Biography ==
Yuri Sakharov was born on 18 September 1922 in Vlasovka of Shakhty district (rayon), Rostov region (oblast). His father was an official in the Donbas mining industry. In 1938 during the Great Purge he was arrested and executed. Yuri Sakharov became a "son of an enemy of the people." After the German invasion of the USSR during World War II Sakharov twice was mobilized for engineering work (digging trenches), but both times, under the pressure of the advance of the Nazi troops during the disorderly retreat of the Red Army, the civilian mobilized were left to their own devices, and Sakharov twice returned home to Stalino. After the second return, it turned out that the Soviet troops and the military registration and enlistment office had already left the city, and the Germans had not yet arrived. At the first months of German occupation Sakharov with their mother lived in Stalino. They were forced to gradually sell off their belongings for food. For a short time, Sakharov worked as a secretary at a school whose director was his chess teacher Apollinariy Gaevsky. In April 1942, when the financial situation became completely desperate, Sakharov, with one of the echelons, together with other Soviet citizens, went to work in Germany, where he was assigned to the Anna-3 mine near the city of Alsdorf. When his knowledge of German was discovered, Sakharov, in addition to his main job, was appointed translator for the camp commandant. Subsequently, this fact, along with going to work in Germany, served as a reason for accusing him of treason.

At the end of August 1944, as the front line approached, the Anna-3 mine camp was evacuated by the Germans, and the camp workers were sent to a new location on foot. But at the first overnight stay, Sakharov escaped (by stealing a bicycle from a policeman) and returned to the Anna-3 mine, where he waited for the arrival of American troops. After some time, the Americans, along with other Soviet citizens, transferred him to a camp in Belgium. Sakharov did not perform military service in the presence of American troops, being involved only in auxiliary (household) work and, accordingly, did not have any military awards. At the beginning of June 1945, Sakharov arrived in the Soviet zone of occupation, from where he returned to his homeland.

Back home in Ukraine, he got a job as an Inspector in Kyiv.

In 1951 he brilliantly won the Semi Final USSR Chess Championship in Lviv and was qualified together with Lev Aronin and Vladimir Simagin who tied up the second and third places to participate in the XIX USSR Chess Championship in Moscow. Also, he fulfilled the norm requirement of Chess Master. But very soon he was arrested by denunciation and his Chess Master He was awarded the title of Chess Master only in 1956. Lev Aronin, Vladimir Simagin, and Salomon Flohr were qualified from Lvov and went to Moscow. All mentions of Sakharov were removed from books and articles being prepared for publication, including a collection of selected games of Ukrainian chess players edited by Isaac Lipnitsky and Boris Ratner (1952).

Contrary to the version that has become widespread in a number of publications, Yuri Nikolaevich was not arrested due to a random denunciation. Documents from his case, stored in the archive of the SSU, indicate that immediately after returning from Germany he was under close surveillance by state security agencies. The first interrogation of a witness available in the mentioned case is dated December 2, 1946. On March 7, 1952, the Military Tribunal of the Kyiv Military District, on charges of treason, sentenced Yuri Sakharov to 25 years in prison, followed by loss of rights and confiscation of property. He served time in one of the Ozerlag camps.

In 1955, Sakharov was denied amnesty. But in 1956 he was released by independent decisions of two authorities. First, on June 25, 1956, the Plenum of the Supreme Court of the USSR ruled on his release with the removal of his criminal record. When this resolution reached the place of detention only in early October, it turned out that Yuri Nikolaevich had already been released (as “unreasonably convicted” with the note “considered not convicted”) by decision of August 10, 1956 of one of the many local commissions for the review of cases repressed, which were created by the Decree of the Presidium of the Supreme Soviet of the USSR of March 24, 1956.

Sakharov rebuilt his chess career. When he was 46, he became the 17th highest rated player in the world.

He died in 1981 in Bucha, Kyiv Oblast. The circumstances of his death remain unknown.

== Chess career ==
Sakharov was the champion of Kyiv in 1948 and in 1949, and shared 1-2 place with A. Kofman in 1947 (8.5/13) and with V.Shianovsky in 1961 (8/12).

Sakharov was twice the Ukrainian Champion in 1966 and 1968. He participated in 19 Ukrainian Championships, tying for 4-6th in 1946 (Anatoly Bannik won), tying for 3rd-4th in 1947 (Alexey Sokolsky won), tying for 6-9th in 1949 (Isaac Lipnitsky won), taking 5th in 1951 (Bannik won), taking 2nd, behind Efim Geller, in 1958, tying for 4-5th in 1959 (Geller won), sharing 1st with Leonid Stein but lost to him a match for the title (+1 −3 =2) in 1960, tying for 3rd-4th in 1961 (Yuri Kots won), taking 3rd in 1962 (Stein won), and tying for 2nd-3rd in 1964 (Bannik won).

Year	City	Name	Points	Place	Featured Game
1940	Kyiv	12 Championship of Ukraine	6.5/17	13-15	vs I. Boleslavsky (W)
1946	Kyiv	15 Championship of Ukraine	11.5/17	4-6	
1947	Kyiv	16 Championship of Ukraine	10.5/16	3-4	
1948	Kyiv	17 Championship of Ukraine	7.5/18	13-15	vs E. Geller(W)
1949	Odessa	18 Championship of Ukraine	11.5/19	6-9	vs E. Geller(W)
1950	Kyiv	19 Championship of Ukraine	8.5/17	9-11	vs I. Lipnitsky(D)
1951	Kyiv	20 Championship of Ukraine	10.5/17	5	
1957	Kyiv	26 Championship of Ukraine	11/17	3	vs Flohr (D)
1958	Kyiv	27 Championship of Ukraine	10.5/16	2-4	vs GM E. Geller(D)
1959	Kyiv	28 Championship of Ukraine	13/21	4-5	
1960	Kyiv	29 Championship of Ukraine	12/17	1-2	vs L. Stein(W)
1961	Kyiv	30 Championship of Ukraine	9/15	3-4	
1962	Kyiv	31 Championship of Ukraine	11.5/17	3	
1963	Kyiv	32 Championship of Ukraine	10/17	4-5	
1964	Kyiv	33 Championship of Ukraine	13/19	2-3	
1966	Kyiv	35 Championship of Ukraine	13/17	1	
1967	Kyiv	36 Championship of Ukraine	8/13	6-16	
1968	Kyiv	37 Championship of Ukraine	12.5/17	1	
1970	Kyiv	39 Championship of Ukraine	4.5/17	18	

Yuri Sakharov played in the Ukrainian team during Soviet Team Chess Championships.

Year	City	Name	Board	Result	Featured Game
1948	Leningrad	1st Soviet Team Chess Championship	9	3.5/6	
1958	Vilnius	5th Soviet Team Chess Championship	3	4.5/8	vs GM Averbakh (D)
1959	Moscow	6th Soviet Team Chess Championship	4	6/9	vs GM Tolush (W)
1960	Moscow	7th Soviet Team Chess Championship	3	4.5/8	vs IM Makogonov(W)
1967	Moscow	10th Soviet Team Chess Championship	4	4/8	vs GM Antoshin (D)
1968	Grozny	11th Soviet Team Chess Championship	Reserve	2.5/6	vs GM Furman (D)

Twice Sakharov became the Champion of the Ukrainian Voluntary Sports Society "Avangard" (Russian: ДСО "Авангард") in 1962 (11.5/15) and 1964 (8.5/13).

He played for the "Avangard" Team during Soviet Team Chess Cup Tournaments.

Year	City	Name	Board	Result	Featured Game
1961	Moscow	3rd Soviet Team Chess Cup	4	2.5/5	vs GM Boleslavsky (D)
1964	Moscow	4th Soviet Team Chess Cup	2	2/6	vs GM Averbakh (D)
1966	Moscow	5th Soviet Team Chess Cup	2	4/8	vs GM Korchnoi (D)
1968	Riga	6th Soviet Team Chess Cup	2	3.5/9	vs IM Osnos (D)
1971	Rostov-on-Don	7th Soviet Team Chess Cup	Reserve	.5/2	vs GM Krogius (D)

He participated in the USSR Chess Championships 5 times.

Year	City	Championship	Points	Place	Featured Game
1960	Leningrad	XXVII	6/19	18-20	vs Bronstein (D)
1964/65	Kyiv	XXXII	7.5/19	17	vs Bannik (W)
1965	Tallinn	XXXIII	10.5/19	7	vs Stein (W)
1967	Kharkov	XXXV	9/13	6	vs Polugaevsky (D)
1968/69	Alma-Ata	XXXVI	9/19	14	vs Tal (D)

He was a winner of International Chess Tournament in Varna in 1968 and made the first norm for a title of International Master.

Yuri Sakharov successfully played in friendly international matches both for the USSR and Ukraine.

Match	Year	Location	Score	Games
10 Match USSR-Yugoslavia	1966	Sukhumi	3 out 5	
USSR-Yugoslavia	1968	Sochi	3.5 out 4	
Ukraine-West Berlin	1970	Kiev	2 out 4	

Yuri Sakharov was part of the Soviet Team that won gold in Chess Correspondence Olympiad VI of 1968–1972 and VII of 1972–1976.

Year	Name	Board	Points	Team Place	Featured Game
1968-1972	6th Correspondence Chess Olympiad	4	7/8 (the best board)	1	
1972-1977	7th Correspondence Chess Olympiad	4	5/9	1	

He earned the title of International Correspondence Chess Master (IMC) in 1971.

Year	Name	Points	Place	Featured Game
1973-1977	1st CC World Cup Final	7/14	7	
1977-1983	9th Correspondence World Championship Final	7.5/16	10	vs Tonu Oim (L)

== Honors ==
As a chess player

- Winner of the 9th Championship of Trade Unions in Leningrad, now Saint Petersburg (1971)
- Winner of the International Tournament in Varna (1968)
- USSR Chess Championships Participant (5): 1960, 1964/65, 1965(7 place), 1967(6 place), 1968/69
- Ukrainian Chess Championship Winner(2): 1966, 1968
- Championship of Sports Society "Avangard" Winner(2): 1962, 1964
- Kiev Chess Championship Winner(4): 1947 (1-2), 1948, 1949, 1961 (1-2)
- Stalino (now Donetsk) Region Championship Winner(2): 1940, 1946
