= Igor Novikov (chess player) =

Ukrainian-American chess player (born 1962)

Personal information
- Born: May 23, 1962 (age 64)

Chess career
- Country: Soviet Union → Ukraine; United States
- Title: Grandmaster (1990)
- FIDE rating: 2466 (October 2026)
- Peak rating: 2614 (July 1999)
- Peak ranking: No. 50 (July 1990)

Igor Oleksandrovych Novikov (Ukrainian: Ігор Олександрович Новіков; born May 23, 1962) is a Ukrainian-American chess player. He was awarded the title of Grandmaster by FIDE in 1990. He has been listed seven times on the FIDE world top 100 players list.

In 1985, he won the team gold medal playing for the Soviet Union and also won an individual gold playing on board four at the World Youth U26 Team Championship. Novikov won the Ukrainian championship in 1989, jointly with Gennady Kuzmin.

While living in Brooklyn he won the Marshall Chess Club Championship in 2002. In the United States he has won first place in New York Smartchess International I and II, the 2003 20th Sands Regency Western States Open, the 2003 National Chess Congress, and the 2004 UTD Grand Master Invitational Chess Tournament, while he tied for first at the 1999 World Open, the Chicago Open (2005 and 1998), and at the Foxwoods Open (1999 and 2001).

Also a trainer, Novikov trained grandmasters Irina Krush and Alex Lenderman, among others. In Ukraine, during 1988, together with International Master Igor Foygel, he taught the under 21 team.

Novikov was a member of the victorious United States team at the World Senior Team Championship, in the 50+ section, in 2019 and in 2020.
