= Savon =

Savon or Savón is a surname. Notable people with the surname include:

- Amarilis Savón (born 1974), Cuban judoka, Olympic bronze medalist
- Erislandy Savón (born 1990), Cuban amateur boxer
- Félix Savón (born 1967), Cuban heavyweight boxer, winner of three Olympic gold medals
- Vladimir Savon (1940–2005), Ukrainian chess player
- SAVON (born October 31, 1997), born Savon Boone. American singer-songwriter. Born in Chicago, Illinois.

== See also ==
- Sav-on, Osco drugstore chain
- Sav-On gasoline stations, operated by the Oneida nation
- Soap
