= Konstantin Lerner =

Ukrainian chess grandmaster (1950–2011)

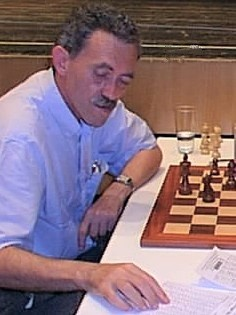
- Lerner in 1999

Personal information
- Born: 28 February 1950 Odesa, Ukrainian SSR, Soviet Union
- Died: 24 September 2011 (aged 61) Herzliya, Israel

Chess career
- Country: Soviet Union → Ukraine
- Title: Grandmaster (1986)
- Peak rating: 2605 (July 1995)
- Peak ranking: No. 41 (January 1987)

Konstantin Zaivelevich Lerner (Ukrainian: Костантин Зайвелевич Лернер; 28 February 1950 – 24 September 2011) was a Ukrainian chess grandmaster. In 1978 and 1982, he was Ukrainian Champion.

== Career ==
He played in several Soviet Union championships, and his best achievement was second place, behind Andrei Sokolov, at Lviv in 1984. In 1986, Lerner finished 2nd equal with 5 other players.

Lerner won or shared first place in many tournaments, among others at Polanica-Zdrój 1985 and 1986 (Rubinstein Memorial), Tallinn 1986, Moscow 1986, Genoa 1989, Copenhagen 1990, Gausdal 1992, Mykolaiv 1995 (zonal), Berlin 1997, Graz 1997, Recklinghausen 1999, Bad Wörishofen 2000, Tel Aviv 2001 and 2002, Rishon Le Zion 2004, Givatayim 2005 (Ettinger Memorial), and Herzliya 2005 (Arye Urieli Memorial).

In 2004, he tied for third-fourth at the Israeli open championships in Ramat Aviv. He won the bronze medal at the 2005 Maccabiah Games. He was awarded the GM title in 1986. The website Chessmtrics.com, which estimates the strength of older players, indicates that he was ranked 7th in the world in 1986.

He arrived in Israel in 2001 and lived there for 10 years, playing for Kfar Saba chess club, until his death in 2011. In his last days he suffered from several health problems due to being a life-long chain-smoker. He died in Herzliya, Israel in 2011, aged 61.

== See also ==
- List of Jewish chess players
