= Tatiana Melamed =

German chess player (born 1974)

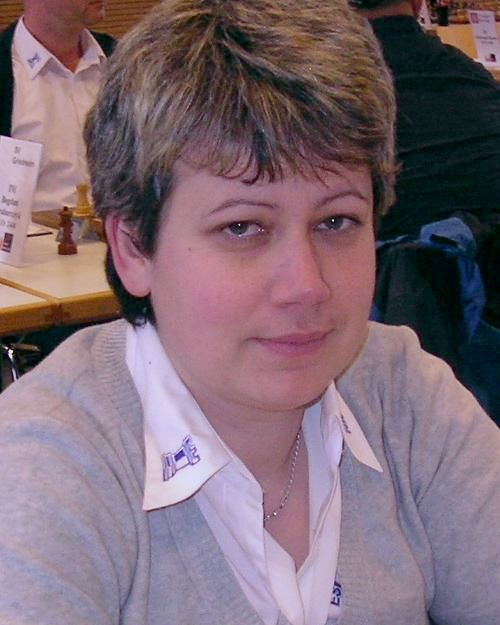
- Tatiana Melamed in 2011

Personal information
- Born: 3 February 1974 (age 52) Chernihiv, Ukraine

Chess career
- Country: Ukraine (until 2010); Germany (since 2010)
- Title: Woman Grandmaster (1999)
- Peak rating: 2387 (July 1999)

Tatiana Melamed (born 3 February 1974) is a Ukraine born German (since 2010) chess player who holds the title of Woman grandmaster (WGM, 1999), Ukrainian Women's Chess Championship winner (1996).

== Biography ==
In 1994, Tatiana Melamed represented Ukraine at the European Junior Chess Championship in U20 girl's age group and shared 6th to 9th place. In 1996, she won Ukrainian Women's Chess Championship and shared 3rd place in Lyudmila Rudenko Memorial Chess Tournament in Saint Petersburg. In 1998, Tatiana Melamed was 2nd in Saint Petersburg. In 2001, she won the International Chess Tournament in Saint Petersburg. Tatiana Melamed twice won silver medals in German Open Women's Chess Championships: in 2004 in Osterburg and in 2006 in Bad Königshofen.

Tatiana Melamed played for Germany in Women's Chess Olympiads:

- In 2012, at second board in the 40th Chess Olympiad (women) in Istanbul (+3, =5, -1),
- In 2014, at third board in the 41st Chess Olympiad (women) in Tromsø (+2, =4, -3).

Tatiana Melamed played for Germany in European Team Chess Championship:

- In 2013, at fourth board in the 10th European Team Chess Championship (women) in Warsaw (+2, =4, -1).

In 1999 she awarded the FIDE Woman grandmaster (WGM) title.
