= Lyubov Idelchyk =

Soviet chess player (1936–2006)

Personal information
- Born: 15 March 1936 Odesa, Ukrainian SSR
- Died: 13 November 2006 (aged 70) Philadelphia, United States

Chess career
- Country: Soviet Union; United States
- Peak rating: 2315 (January 1990)

Lyubov Idelchyk (Ukrainian: Любов Мойсеївна Ідельчик; 15 March 1936, Odesa — 13 November 2006, Philadelphia), née Nisenboim (Ukrainian: Нісенбойм), was a Soviet chess player who two times won the Ukrainian Women Chess Championship (1963, 1969). Master of Sport of the USSR in chess (1966).

== Chess career ==
In 1954 she won Odesa city Women Chess Championship. In the 1960s, Lyubov Idelchyk was one of the best female chess players in Ukraine. Twice she won in the Ukrainian Women's Chess Championships (1963, 1969). In 1968 Lyubov Idelchyk won Soviet Trade Unions Women's Chess Championship, but in 1971 in this competition she shared 3rd-4th places. From 1958 to 1972 Lyubov Idelchyk five times participated in the USSR Women's Chess Championship, where the best result was 8th place in 1966. Twice she played for the Ukrainian national team at the Soviet Team Chess Championship (1963, 1967). Three times she played for the Ukrainian sports society Avangard at the Soviet Chess Cup (1964-1968).

From the mid-1980s, she lived in United States.

== Literature ==
- Игорь Бердичевский. Шахматная еврейская энциклопедия. Москва: Русский шахматный дом, 2016. ISBN 978-5-94693-503-6
