= Elizaveta Malakhova =

Ukrainian chess player (born 1993)

Liza Malakhova
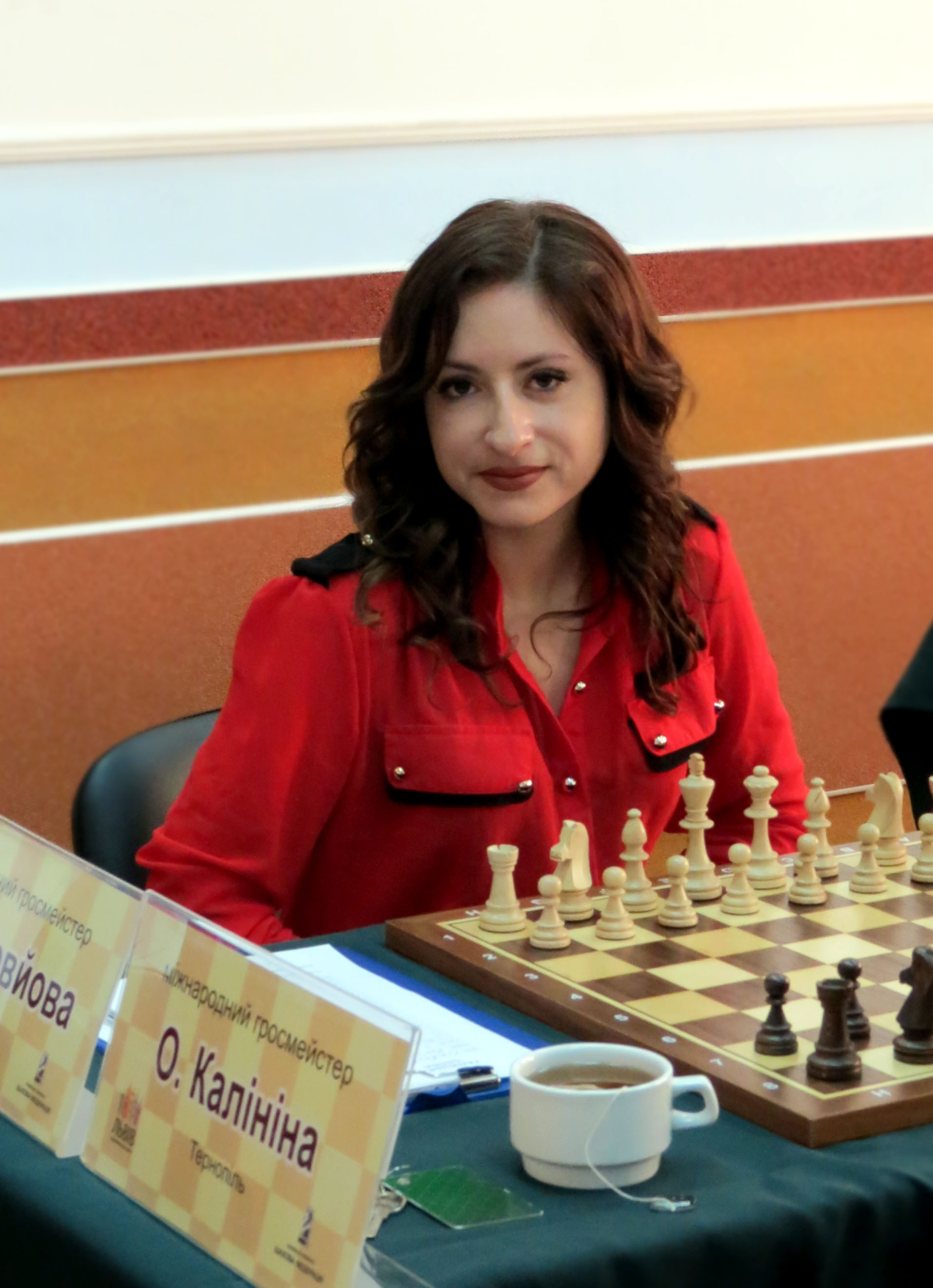
- Malakhova in 2015

Personal information
- Full name: Elizaveta Hikmativna Malakhova
- Born: 13 March 1993 (age 33) Lviv, Ukraine

Chess career
- Country: Ukraine
- Title: Woman Grandmaster (2010)
- FIDE rating: 2281 (January 2018)
- Peak rating: 2337 (May 2017)

Elizaveta "Liza" Hikmativna Malakhova (Ukrainian: Ліза Хікматівна Малахова; born 13 March 1993), née Soloviova (Ukrainian: Соловйова), is a Ukrainian chess player who holds the title of Woman grandmaster (WGM, 2010).

== Chess career ==
Multiple medal winner in Ukrainian girls' championships in the different age categories: two gold (U12 -2005, U14 - 2007) and three silver (U10 - 2003, U14 - 2006, U18 - 2008). In 2007, she won silver medal in European Youth Chess Championship in the age category U14. In 2014 she won third prize in Moscow chess festival Moscow Open student tournament. In 2016 in Rivne she won Ukrainian women's chess championship.

In 2009, she was awarded the FIDE Woman International Master (WIM) title and received the FIDE Woman Grandmaster (WGM) title year later.
