= Vladlen Zurakhov =

Ukrainian chess player

Personal information
- Born: Vladlen Yakovych Zurakhov; 19 May 1930
- Died: 1991

Chess career
- Country: Soviet Union → Ukraine
- Title: USSR Master of Sports

Vladlen Yakovlevich Zurakhov (Ukrainian: Владлен Якович Зурахов, romanized: Vladlen Yakovych Zurakhov, Russian: Владлен Якович Зурахов; 19 May 1930 – 1991) was one of the leading Ukrainian chess players of his time. He was Ukrainian champion in 1952 (at the age of 22) and finalist of USSR Chess Championship in 1956. Awarded USSR Master of Sports title in 1954. Kyiv champion in 1957 and 1959. He was a chemical engineer.

== Chess career ==
Participated ten times in the Ukrainian championship, champion in 1952.

Participant in the final tournament of the USSR Championship in 1956 (8½ points out of 17 possible - 9th place).

Champion of Kyiv in 1957 and 1959.

Silver medalist of the USSR team championship in 1961.
