= Naum Levin =

Ukrainian-Australian chess player

Personal information
- Born: 8 February 1933 Chernihiv, Ukraine
- Died: 23 February 2020 (aged 87) Sydney, Australia

Chess career
- Country: Australia
- Peak rating: 2420 (January 1984)

Naum L. Levin (8 February 1933 - 23 February 2020) was a Ukrainian–Australian chess master and trainer.

Levin was champion of the Kiev Avant-garde Club in 1963. He participated many times in the Ukrainian Chess Championship and took 18th in 1959, tied for 13–15th in 1960, tied for 3–4th in 1961, took 10th in 1962, tied for 4–5th in 1963, took 5th in 1964, tied for 7–8th in 1966, tied for 3–5th in 1967, tied for 6–9th in 1968, and shared 6th in 1970.

He tied for 27–40th at Kharkov 1967 (USSR Chess Championship, Swiss system), and took 11th at Poti 1970 (Georgian Chess Championship).

At the end of the 1970s, he emigrated to Australia. He tied for 1st–3rd with Fred Flatow and Maxwell Fuller in the City of Sydney Championship in 1981. Levin retired from Chess competition in early 1980's.
