= Kiev City Chess Championship =

Historical competition in Ukraine

Year	Winner
1900	Boris Nikolaev
1901	Moishe Lowtzky
1902	Fedor Duz-Khotimirsky
1903	Fedor Duz-Khotimirsky
1904	Fedor Duz-Khotimirsky
1905	P.P. Benko
1906	Fedor Duz-Khotimirsky
1908	Stefan Izbinsky
1909	Boris Nikolaev
1910	Stefan Izbinsky
1911	Fedor Bogatyrchuk
1913	Alexander Evenson
1914	Alexander Evenson

Year	Name	Winner	Featured Game
1947	Kiev Championship	A. Kofman and Yuri N. Sakharov	
1948	Kiev Championship	Yuri N. Sakharov	
January-March 1949	Kiev Championship	Yuri N. Sakharov	
1961	Kiev Championship	Yuri N. Sakharov and V. Shianovsky	
