= Vsevolod Rauzer =

Soviet Ukrainian chess player (1908–1941)

Personal information
- Born: Vsevolod Alfredovich Rauzer; October 16, 1908
- Died: December 29, 1941 Leningrad, USSR

Chess career
- Country: Soviet Union

Vsevolod Alfredovich Rauzer, also spelled Wsewolod Rauser (Russian: Всеволод Альфредович Раузер; 16 October 1908 — 29 December 1941) was a Soviet Ukrainian chess master known for his great contributions to chess opening theory, especially of the Sicilian Defence.

== Achievements ==
Vsevolod Rauzer tied for first in the 1927 Ukrainian Chess Championship with Alexey Selezniev, but lost the playoff to Selezniev (off contest). Eventually, he took the Ukrainian Champion title. He was the joint Ukrainian Champion in 1933. He took sixth at Leningrad 1933, the 8th USSR Chess Championship, won by future World Champion Mikhail Botvinnik. Rauzer finished fifth at Leningrad 1935, won by Vasily Panov, and shared first and second place with Vitaly Chekhover at Leningrad 1936 (All-Union Young Masters), which was an eight-man double Round-robin tournament. At another eight man double round-robin in Leningrad in 1936, he scored clear first, a half point ahead of Viacheslav Ragozin and a full two points ahead of Grigory Levenfish. (Levenfish would win the Soviet Championship the following year.) Rauzer's greatest tournament success came at the USSR Championship in Tbilisi in 1937, where he scored 12 out of 19, only half a point behind tournament winner Grigory Levenfish. Based on these latter two results, the website Chessmetrics.com estimates Rauzer's peak rating at 2627 and ranks him as 22nd in the world in mid-1937. Rauzer played very little or not at all after 1937 due to mental problems. He was confined to a psychiatric hospital at the end of 1940 and died the next year in the Siege of Leningrad.

== Opening Contributions ==
Position: a8 black rook, c8 black bishop, d8 black queen, e8 black king, f8 black bishop, h8 black rook, a7 black pawn, b7 black pawn, e7 black pawn, f7 black pawn, g7 black pawn, h7 black pawn, c6 black knight, d6 black pawn, f6 black knight, g5 white bishop, d4 white knight, e4 white pawn, c3 white knight, a2 white pawn, b2 white pawn, c2 white pawn, f2 white pawn, g2 white pawn, h2 white pawn, a1 white rook, d1 white queen, e1 white king, f1 white bishop, h1 white rook

The Richter–Rauzer Attack

Rauzer is probably best known for his extensive chess opening theory. The Richter–Rauzer Variation of the Sicilian Defence (also known as the Richter–Rauzer Attack), was named in honor of him and the German master Kurt Richter. The Encyclopaedia of Chess Openings code for the Richter–Rauzer Attack is B60.

Rauzer did pioneering work in methods of attacking the Sicilian Dragon by castling queenside. His efforts in this area predate the famed Yugoslav Attack in the Dragon by at least fifteen years. As late as the mid-1950s, Soviet chess literature frequently called the Yugoslav Attack the Rauzer Attack in honor of his pioneering efforts.

In the Ruy Lopez Chigorin Variation, the approach where White exchanges pawns at e5 or c5 and then directs a knight (supported by a pawn at e4) into d5 is also known as the Rauzer Attack. The knight typically travels on the circuit b1–d2–f1–e3–d5 and this attack can be powerful even if it results in a sacrifice of White's e-pawn. This plan has been successfully adopted over the years by many strong Grandmasters, including Bobby Fischer.
