= Ratmir Kholmov =

Russian chess grandmaster (1925–2006)

Personal information
- Born: Ratmir Dmitrievich Kholmov; 13 May 1925 Shenkursk, Russian SFSR, Soviet Union
- Died: 18 February 2006 (aged 80) Moscow, Russia

Chess career
- Country: Russia
- Title: Grandmaster (1960)
- Peak rating: 2555 (January 1977)
- Peak ranking: No. 28 (January 1976)

Ratmir Dmitrievich Kholmov (Russian: Ратмир Дмитриевич Холмов; 13 May 1925 – 18 February 2006) was a Russian chess grandmaster. He won many international tournaments in Eastern Europe during his career, and tied for the Soviet Championship title in 1963, but lost the playoff. Kholmov was not well known in the West, since he never competed there during his career peak, being confined to events in socialist countries. His chess results were impressive, so this may have been for security reasons, as Kholmov had been a wartime sailor. But he was one of the strongest Soviet players from the mid-1950s well into the 1970s, and was ranked as high as No. 8 in the world by Chessmetrics.com from August 1960 to March 1961. Kholmov stayed active in competitive chess right to the end of his life, and maintained a high standard of play past the age of 80.

== Early years ==
Kholmov learned chess at age 12, and was near Master strength within three years. He served as a sailor in the Soviet merchant marine during World War II, sailing mainly the Northern Arctic route. In 1945, he took 5th in Tula. In 1946, he won in Zhdanovichi (Belarus). In 1947, he took 4th in the 13th Belarusian championship. Later that year, he made his first high-level appearance at the Mikhail Chigorin Memorial, Moscow 1947, scoring 5½/15 against a powerful international field. In 1948, Kholmov won the next BLR-ch in 1948, unbeaten, with 11½/13.

Kholmov qualified for his first Soviet final in 1948, Moscow URS-ch16, scoring 8½/18 for 12th place, where the winners were David Bronstein and Alexander Kotov. He had to return to the Soviet semifinal level at Tbilisi 1949, where he placed 3rd with 10½/17 to advance. At Moscow URS-ch17, 1949, he showed solid improvement, finishing tied 9th–10th with 10/19, as Bronstein and Vasily Smyslov won.

In 1950, he took 3rd in Pärnu, 7th in Tbilisi, and tied 4th–5th in the Spartak Club Championship. He missed Finals qualifying at Tartu 1950 (URS-ch18sf) with 9½/15 for fifth place. In 1954, he took 2nd, behind Vladas Mikėnas in Vilnius (Quadrangular). Kholmov won, or tied for 1st, in the Lithuanian championships in 1949, 1950, 1951, 1952, 1953, 1955, 1957, 1958, 1959, and 1960, making a total of ten outright or shared Lithuanian titles. This consistent success meant that he could be a full-time chess professional.

== International debut ==
Kholmov made his international debut at Bucharest 1954 with a tied 3rd–4th place, on 11/17, as Viktor Korchnoi won. He placed 6th at Kiev 1954 in the URS-ch21 with 10½/19, with Yuri Averbakh winning; this heralded his arrival in the Soviet elite. FIDE awarded Kholmov the International Master (IM) title in 1954. He tied for 3rd–6th places at Leningrad 1955–56 with 10½/18, as Vladimir Antoshin won. Kholmov tied for 1st–2nd places at Dresden 1956 with Averbakh on 12/15. He earned the International Master title for this. A very solid tied 5th–7th place at URS-ch23 in Leningrad 1956, with 10½/17, reinforced his high-echelon status. He maintained this standard at the next Soviet final, URS-ch24 at Moscow 1957, with 6th place on 12½/21. He placed 2nd at Szczawno-Zdrój 1957 with 11/15 behind winner Efim Geller. Kholmov won the Soviet semifinal at Tashkent 1958 with 11½/15, ahead of Korchnoi and Geller. His first clear international title was at Balatonfüred 1959, where he scored 10/13 to edge Wolfgang Uhlmann. In the URS-ch26 at Tbilisi 1959, Kholmov continued his improvement at the top Soviet level with a tied 4th–5th place, with 12/19, as Tigran Petrosian won.

== Grandmaster ==
Kholmov scored one of the best results of his career with a tied 1st–2nd, along with Smyslov, at the Moscow International 1960 with 8½/11. The same year FIDE awarded him the Grandmaster (GM) title. He won the Soviet semifinal at Novgorod 1961 with 13/16. In Baku, at URS-ch29 (December 1961), he scored 11/20 to tie for 8th–11th places. He was clear first at Bucharest 1962 with 11½/15, ahead of Vladislav Shianovsky. He tied for 2nd–4th places in the Spartak Championship at Minsk 1962 with 11/17, behind Anatoly Bannik. Kholmov won at Kecskemét 1962 with 11/15, ahead of Lajos Portisch and László Szabó, who tied for 2nd–3rd places. He placed 4th in the URS-ch30 at Yerevan 1962 with 13/19, a point behind champion Korchnoi.

In 1963 he shared 1st–3rd, with Boris Spassky and Leonid Stein, at Leningrad at the 31st Soviet Chess Championships. Stein prevailed in the three man playoff. Consequently, Kholmov is arguably the strongest player of the era ranging from the 1940s through the 1960s to never hold the title of Soviet Champion. (Isaac Boleslavsky is the only other player of Kholmov's strength in that period to never hold the title.) At Sochi 1964, Kholmov tied 2nd–3rd places with 10/15, behind winner Nikolai Krogius. Then Kholmov suffered perhaps his greatest career disappointment in the Soviet Zonal tournament, Moscow 1964, where he scored 6/12 for 4th in a super-strong field, but fell one place short of advancing to the Interzonal stage. At Kiev in the URS-ch32 (1964/65), Kholmov tied 5th–6th places with 11½/19, as Korchnoi won. He made a notable result at Havana 1965 with 5th place on 14½/21, as Smyslov won, but Kholmov defeated Bobby Fischer and finished undefeated in the tournament. At Tbilisi 1966/67 for URS-ch34, he scored 10/20 to tie for 10th–12th places, as Stein won again.

Kholmov moved to Moscow in 1967 and lived there for the rest of his life. He won at Belgrade 1967 with 6½/9. One of his best career results was 2nd in a very strong field at Leningrad 1967 with 12/16, behind Korchnoi. He was 4th in an excellent field at Skopje 1967 with 11½/17, as Fischer won. Kholmov won at Havana 1968 with a powerful 12/14, ahead of Stein and Alexey Suetin.

His play in the next four Soviet finals continued to be strong. At Alma-Ata 1968/69 for URS-ch36, he placed 6th–9th with 10½/19, as Lev Polugaevsky and Alexander Zaitsev won. The next Interzonal qualifier was URS-ch37 at Moscow 1969, and he finished tied 7th–9th with 12½/22, with Polugaevsky and Petrosian winning; this was a point short of advancing to the Interzonal. At Riga 1970 for URS-ch38, he dropped a bit with just 10/21 for a tied 13th–14th, as Korchnoi won. Then in Baku 1972 for URS-ch40, he had 10½/21 for a tied 10th–11th place, with Tal winning. This was his last Soviet final. His form in his late 40s had substantially fallen from his best years, and a new generation of Soviet players would earn most of the top tournament places and international opportunities.

Kholmov got just one chance to represent the USSR in a team event at full international level when he played board ten at the European Team Championships, Kapfenberg 1970. He won the board gold medal with 4½/6 (+3−0=3), and helped his side to team gold. Kholmov did play in many national matches, such as against Hungary and Yugoslavia, generally scoring well.

The Chessmetrics website statistically estimates his retroactive ranking at a minimum of Top 25 in the world from 1956 to 1970, with his peak ranking being 8th in 1960–61. They further estimate that his peak rating was 2736, also in 1961.

== Later years ==
Kholmov continued to stay very active in competitive play, and he was generally quite successful. At Luhacovice 1973, he tied for 4th–5th places with 9/15, with Andras Adorjan and Jan Smejkal winning. At Sochi 1974, he scored 8½/15 for a tied 4th–6th place, with Polugaevsky winning. He placed 2nd at Kecskemét 1975 with 8½/13 behind winner Karolyi Honfi. One of Kholmov's best late-career results was his tied 3rd–5th place in a very strong Moscow 1975 tournament, with 9½/15, as Geller won. He tied for 1st–2nd at Budapest 1976 on 10½/15 with László Vadász. He placed 2nd at Zalaegerszeg 1977 with 7½/12 behind Evgeni Vasiukov. At age 63, Kholmov tied 3rd–6th at Sochi 1988 with 7/13, as Sergey Dolmatov won. At Voskresensk 1990, Kholmov tied 3rd–6th on 6½/11 behind winners Igor Naumkin and Valery Neverov. He had an excellent 2nd place at Moscow 1991 with 8½/11 behind winner Mikhail Ivanov. At age 72, Kholmov tied for 1st–3rd at Moscow 1997 on 7½/11 with Igor Zaitsev and Andrey Rychagov.

== World Senior Champion ==
Kholmov tied for the title in the 2000 World Senior Championship at Rowy in Poland, on 8/11 with Mark Taimanov, Jānis Klovāns, and Alexander Chernikov. Then he placed 2nd–4th in the same event the next year at Arco in Italy, again with 8/11, tied with Klovans and Vladimir Karasev, behind champion Vladimir Bukal, Sr.

Kholmov played competitive chess virtually right up until his death in early 2006 at age 80. He appeared in a Senior event in Dresden, 50 years after he won a tournament there.

== Legacy ==
Kholmov was known as "The Central Defender" in Soviet chess circles, because of his great skill at repulsing enemy aggression. But he was also a very dangerous attacker, as most of the leading Soviet players learned. During his peak years, Kholmov was difficult to defeat, even at the top levels. He qualified for 16 Soviet finals between 1949 and 1972, with an aggregate well over 50 per cent. He scored wins over World Champions Petrosian, Spassky, Fischer, and Garry Kasparov. Kholmov was comfortable as White with both 1.e4 and 1.d4, could play excellent classical chess with both colours, and had an occasional fondness for unusual openings, with which he had good success, as the game selection shows.

== Notable chess games ==
- Efim Geller vs. Ratmir Kholmov, USSR Championship, Moscow 1949, Ruy Lopez, Bird's Defence (C61), 0–1 Two rising stars battle for position late in the tournament, and Kholmov scores with an offbeat variation, unleashing a lovely rook sacrifice in the endgame.
- Tigran Petrosian vs. Ratmir Kholmov, USSR Championship, Moscow 1957, Blumenfeld Gambit (E10), 0–1 Another unusual defensive choice takes off the future World Champion.
- Viktor Korchnoi vs. Ratmir Kholmov, USSR Championship semifinal, Tashkent 1958, Modern Benoni Defence (A64), 0–1 The Modern Benoni was just coming into fashion around this time.
- Ratmir Kholmov vs. Paul Keres, USSR Championship, Tbilisi 1959, Sicilian Defence, Rossolimo Variation (B30), 1–0 It's highly unusual to see the powerful tactician Keres get knocked off so quickly.
- Ratmir Kholmov vs. Laszlo Szabo, Kecskemet 1962, Slav Defence, Czech Variation (D19), 1–0 Kholmov overcomes the nine-time Hungarian champion.
- Ratmir Kholmov vs. Leonid Stein, USSR Championship, Yerevan 1962, Sicilian Defence, Moscow Variation (B52), 1–0 Kholmov again scores with this unusual Sicilian line against one of his great rivals from this period.
- Mark Taimanov vs. Ratmir Kholmov, USSR Championship, Leningrad 1963, Nimzo-Indian Defence, Rubinstein / Gligoric Variation (E54), 0–1 Taimanov was a recognized expert on both sides of this defence.
- Ratmir Kholmov vs. Boris Spassky, USSR Zonal Tournament, Moscow 1964, Sicilian Defence, Scheveningen Variation (B84), 1–0 Spassky was the tournament winner and a future World Champion.
- Ratmir Kholmov vs. David Bronstein, USSR Championship, Kiev 1964–65, Sicilian Defence, Najdorf Variation (B99), 1–0 Kholmov outplays the creative attacker Bronstein for one of his most memorable victories.
- Robert Fischer vs. Ratmir Kholmov, Havana 1965, Ruy Lopez, Closed / Chigorin Variation (C98), 0–1 Fischer lost exceptionally rarely on the White side of the Ruy Lopez, so this win was quite an achievement.
- Ratmir Kholmov vs. Garry Kasparov, USSR Championship Qualifying Tournament, Daugavpils 1978, Caro–Kann Defence, Classical Variation (B18), 1–0 Kasparov, just 15 at the time, was the tournament winner and a future World Champion.

== Opening theory ==
A couple of opening variations have been named after Kholmov.

- ECO C92: Ruy Lopez, Closed, Kholmov Variation
  1.e4 e5 2.Nf3 Nc6 3.Bb5 a6 4.Ba4 Nf6 5.0-0 Be7 6.Re1 b5 7.Bb3 0-0 8.c3 d6 9.h3 Be6
- Russian Game, Damiano Variation, Kholmov Gambit (C42)
  1.e4 e5 2.Nf3 Nf6 3.Nxe5 Nxe4 4.Qe2 Qe7
