= Ukrainian Chess Championship =

Chess championship

This is a list of all the winners of the Ukrainian Chess Championship, including those held when Ukraine was a Soviet republic and those held after Ukraine became independent. Players' names listed in parentheses indicate that the player won the tournament but did not receive the title since he was an outside competitor. The title went instead to the top-scoring Ukrainian.

== By year ==
#	Year	City	Winner
1	1924	Kyiv	Yakiv Vilner (1)
2	1925	Kharkiv	Yakiv Vilner (2)
3	1926	Odesa	Borys Verlinsky (1) & Mykhailo Marski (1)
4	1927	Poltava	(Olexiy Selezniov), Vsevolod Rauzer (1)
5	1928	Odesa	Yakiv Vilner (3) & Volodymyr Kirillov (1)
6	1931	Kharkiv	Abram Zamikhovsky (1)
7	1933	Kharkiv	Vsevolod Rauzer (2) & Volodymyr Kirillov (2)
8	1936	Kyiv	Yosyp Pohrebyssky (1) & Petro Shumilin (1)
9	1937	Kyiv	Fedir Bohatyrchuk (1)
10	1938	Kyiv	Isaac Boleslavsky (1)
11	1939	Dnipropetrovsk (now renamed as Dnipro)	Isaac Boleslavsky (2)
12	1940	Kyiv	Isaac Boleslavsky (3)
13	1944	Kyiv	Borys Goldenov (1)
14	1945	Kyiv	Anatoly Bannik (1)
15	1946	Kyiv	Anatoly Bannik (2)
16	1947	Kyiv	Alexey Sokolsky (1)
17	1948	Kyiv	Alexey Sokolsky (2)
18	1949	Odesa	Isaac Lipnitsky (1)
19	1950	Kyiv	Yukhym Heller (1)
20	1951	Kyiv	Anatoly Bannik (3)
21	1952	Kyiv	Vladlen Zurakhov (1)
22	1953	Kyiv	Yakiv Yukhtman (1)
23	1954	Kyiv	Abram Khavin (1)
24	1955	Kyiv	Anatoly Bannik (4)
25	1956	Kyiv	Isaac Lipnitsky (2)
26	1957	Kyiv	(Salo Flohr) (1), Yukhym Heller (2)
27	1958	Kyiv	Yukhym Heller (3)
28	1959	Kyiv	Yukhym Heller (4)
29	1960	Kyiv	Leonid Stein (1)
30	1961	Kyiv	Yuri Kots (1)
31	1962	Kyiv	Leonid Stein (2)
32	1963	Kyiv	Yuri Nikolayevsky (1)
33	1964	Kyiv	Anatoly Bannik (5)
34	1965	Dnipropetrovsk	R. Goldstein (1)
35	1966	Kyiv	Yuri Sakharov (1)
36	1967	Kyiv	Valery Zhydkov (1) & Yuri Nikolayevsky (2)
37	1968	Kyiv	Yuri Sakharov (2)
38	1969	Ivano-Frankivsk	Hennady Kuzmin (1) & Volodymyr Savon (1)
39	1970	Kyiv	Volodymyr Tukmakov (1)
40	1971	Donetsk	Yuri Kots (2)
41	1972	Odesa	Lev Alburt (1)
42	1973	Dnipropetrovsk	Lev Alburt (2)
43	1974	Lviv	Lev Alburt (3)
44	1975	Dnipropetrovsk	Oleksandr Vaisman (1)
45	1976	Donetsk	Mykhailo Pidhayets (1)
46	1977	Zhytomyr	Yuri Nikolayevsky (3)
47	1978	Yalta	Kostiantyn Lerner (1)
48	1979	Dnipropetrovsk	Volodymyr Okhotnyk (1)
49	1980	Kharkiv	Volodymyr Malaniuk (1)
50	1981	Yalta	Volodymyr Malaniuk (2)
51	1982	Yalta	Kostiantyn Lerner (2)
52	1983	Melitopol	Dimitri Komarov (1) & Valery Neverov (1)
53	1984	Kyiv	Mykhailo Hurevych (1)
54	1985	Uzhhorod	Valery Neverov (2)
55	1986	Lviv	Volodymyr Malaniuk (3)
56	1987	Mykolaiv	Viktor Moskalenko (1)
57	1988	Kharkiv & Lviv	Valery Neverov (3)
58	1989	Kherson	Ihor Novikov (1) & Hennady Kuzmin (2)
59	1990	Simferopol	Michail Brodsky (1)
60	1991	Simferopol	Vitali Golod (1)
61	1992	Simferopol	Vladyslav Borovikov (1)
62	1993	Donetsk	Orest Grytsak (1)
63	1994	Alushta	Yuri Kruppa (1)
64	1995	?	Serhiy Kryvosheya (1)
65	1996	Yalta	Mykhailo Holubiev (1) & Valery Neverov (4)
66	1997	Alushta	Volodymyr Baklan (1)
67	1998	Alushta	Lubomyr Mykhailets (1), Volodymyr Baklan (2), Oleh Berezin (1)
68	1999	Alushta	Hennady Kuzmin (3), Alexei Bezgodov (1), Stanislav Savchenko (1), Oleksandr Moiseyenko (1), Andriy Rakhmangulov (1)
69	2000	Sevastopol	Volodymyr Rohovski (1)
70	2001	Ordzhonikidze (now renamed as Pokrov)	Oleksandr Berelovych (1)
71	2002	Alushta	Anton Korobov (1)
72	2003	Simferopol	Yevhen Miroshnychenko (1)
73	2004	Kharkiv	Andriy Volokitin (1)
74	2005	Rivne	Oleksandr Areschenko (1)
75	2006	Poltava	Zakhar Yefymenko (1)
76	2007	Kharkiv	Valeriy Aveskulov (1)
77	2008	Poltava	Yevhen Miroshnychenko (2)
78	2009	Alushta	Volodymyr Jakymov (1)
79	2010	Alushta	Sergey Pavlov (1)
80	2011	Kyiv	Ruslan Ponomariov (1)
81	2012	Kyiv	Anton Korobov (2)
82	2013	Kyiv	Yuriy Kryvoruchko (1)
83	2014	Lviv	Yuriy Kuzubov (1)
84	2015	Lviv	Andriy Volokitin (2)
85	2016	Rivne	Mikhailo Oleksienko (1)
86	2017	Zhytomyr	Petro Golubka (1)
87	2018	Kyiv	Anton Korobov (3)
88	2019	Lutsk	Evgeny Shtembuliak (1)
89	2020	Omelnyk	Anton Korobov (4)
90	2021	Kharkiv	Andriy Volokitin (3)
91	2023	Poltava	Dmitri Maksimov (1)
92	2024	Lviv	Roman Degtyarev (1)
93	2025	Lviv	Vladislav Bakhmatsky (1)

== Most championships ==
#	Name	Titles	Years	Status
1	Anatoly Bannik	5	1945, 1946, 1951, 1955, 1964	1921-2013
2	Yukhym Heller	4	1950, 1957, 1958, 1959	1925–1998
3	Valery Neverov	4	1983, 1985, 1988, 1996	1962-present
4	Anton Korobov	4	2002, 2012, 2018, 2020	1985–present
5	Yakiv Vilner	3	1924, 1925, 1928	1899–1931
6	Isaac Boleslavsky	3	1938, 1939, 1940	1919–1977
7	Lev Alburt	3	1972, 1973, 1974	1945–present
8	Yuri Nikolayevsky	3	1963, 1967, 1977	1937–present
9	Volodymyr Malaniuk	3	1980, 1981, 1986	1957–present
10	Hennady Kuzmin	3	1969, 1989, 1999	1946–present

== Women ==
#	Year	City	Winner
1	1935		Berta Vaisberg, Roza Kliherman
2	1936		Zinaida Artemieva, Berta Vaisberg, Roza Kliherman
3	1937		Tamara Dobrovolska
4	1938		Zinaida Artemieva, Berta Vaisberg, Sofiya Sokolyk
5	1939		Sara Slobodyanyk
6	1946		Berta Vaisberg
7	1947		Lyubov Kohan
8	1948		Lyubov Kohan
9	1949		Korsunska
10	1950		Berta Vaisberg, A. Rubinchyk
11	1951		Lyubov Kohan
12	1952		Lyubov Kohan
13	1953		Lyubov Kohan
14	1954		Lyubov Kohan
15	1955		Ester Goldberg
16	1956		Berta Vaisberg
17	1957		Olena Malynova
18	1958		Nina Rusinkevich
19	1959		Berta Vaisberg
20	1960		Olena Malynova
21	1961		Olga Andreieva
22	1962		Olena Malynova
23	1963		Lyubov Idelchyk
24	1964		Raisa Vapnychna
25	1965		Olga Andreieva
26	1966		Olga Andreieva
27	1967		Marta Shul
28	1968		Nina Rusinkevich
29	1969		Lyubov Idelchyk
30	1970		Tatiana Morozova
31	1971		Lidia Semenova
32	1972		Olga Andreieva
33	1973		Olena Yelina
34	1974		Lydia Mulenko
35	1975		Lyubov Shcherbyna
36	1976		Lydia Mulenko
37	1977		Marta Litinskaya
38	1978		Lyubov Lysenko
39	1979		Elena Titova
40	1980		Larisa Muchnik
41	1981	Odesa	Natalia Gasiunas
42	1982	Lviv	Irina Chelushkina
43	1983	Kyiv	Viktoria Artamonova
44	1984	Sevastopol	Natalia Ruchieva
45	1985	Mykolaiv	Larisa Muchnik
46	1986	Lviv	Zoya Lelchuk
47	1987	Lviv	Irina Chelushkina
48	1988	Kyiv	Elena Sedina
49	1989	Luhansk	Maria Nepeina
50	1990	Kyiv	Elena Sedina
51	1991	Luhansk	Maria Nepeina
52	1992	Luhansk	Maria Nepeina
53	1993	Kharkiv	Maria Dekusar
54	1994	Luhansk	Natalia Kiseleva
55	1995	Lviv	Marta Litinskaya
56	1996	Chernihiv	Tatiana Melamed
57	1997	Kyiv	Lidia Semenova
58	1998	Kalush	Galina Shliakhtich
59	1999	Kharkiv	Nadezhda Jadvizhena
60	2000	Mykolaiv	Katerina Rohonyan
61	2001	Kramatorsk	Anna Zatonskih
62	2002	Alushta	Tatjana Vasilevich
63	2003	Mykolaiv	Anna Muzychuk
64	2004	Alushta	Olga Alexandrova
65	2005	Kharkiv	Anna Ushenina
66	2006	Odesa	Oksana Vozovic
67	2007	Poltava	Tatjana Vasilevich
68	2008	Mykolaiv	Inna Gaponenko
69	2009	Evpatoria	Evgeniya Doluhanova
70	2010	Poltava	Tatjana Vasilevich
71	2011	Poltava	Kateryna Dolzhykova
72	2012	Kharkiv	Mariya Muzychuk
73	2013	Kyiv	Mariya Muzychuk
74	2014	Lviv	Anna Muzychuk
75	2015	Lviv	Anastasiya Rakhmangulova
76	2016	Rivne	Elizaveta Malakhova
77	2017	Zhytomyr	Iulija Osmak
78	2018	Kyiv	Nataliya Buksa
79	2019	Lutsk	Natalia Zhukova
80	2020	Kherson	Nataliya Buksa
81	2021	Kharkiv	Kateryna Dolzhykova
82	2023	Poltava	Maritsa Tsirulnik
83	2024	Lviv	Evgenia Toroptseva
84	2025	Lviv	Tetyana Skarbarchuk
