= Gennady Kuzmin =

Ukrainian chess grandmaster and trainer (1946–2020)

Gennady Kuzmin Геннадий Кузьмин
Personal information
- Born: Gennady Pavlovich Kuzmin; January 19, 1946 Mariinsk, Kemerovo Oblast, Russian SFSR, Soviet Union
- Died: February 28, 2020 (aged 74) Luhansk, Ukraine

Chess career
- Country: Soviet Union → Ukraine
- Title: Grandmaster (1973)
- Peak rating: 2600 (May 1974)
- Peak ranking: No. 14 (January 1975)

Gennady Pavlovich Kuzmin (Russian: Геннадий Павлович Кузьмин, Ukrainian: Геннадій Павлович Кузьмін, romanized: Hennadiy Pavlovych Kuzmin; January 19, 1946 – February 28, 2020) was a Ukrainian chess player and trainer. He reached his peak strength in the early to mid-1970s and in 1973, was awarded the title of International Grandmaster by FIDE, the governing body.

== Career ==
Kuzmin competed in the Soviet Chess Championship eleven times between 1965 and 1991. His best results occurred in 1972 in Baku (3rd= behind Mikhail Tal and Vladimir Tukmakov) and 1973 in Moscow (2nd= behind Boris Spassky). The Baku final was also a qualifier for the 1973 Leningrad Interzonal, in which he placed seventh of eighteen players.

He was invited to compete at the Biel Interzonal in 1976, but ex-World Champion Vassily Smyslov played in his place. Kuzmin later expressed disquiet regarding that. A second Interzonal appearance occurred at Riga 1979, when he again finished in the top half of the table.

In other competition, he achieved outright or shared first place at Hastings 1973/74 (with László Szabó, Tal and Jan Timman), Baku 1977, Tallinn 1979, Kladovo 1980, Dortmund 1981 (with Jon Speelman and Ľubomír Ftáčnik) and Bangalore 1981. Other notable results included Lvov 1978 (third equal after Yuri Balashov and Rafael Vaganian) and Tallinn 1985 (second after Sergey Dolmatov). In 1990, he was the Moscow Blitz Champion.

He had three times been the Ukraine national champion in a period spanning thirty years; 1969 at Ivano-Frankivsk (shared with Vladimir Savon), 1989 at Kherson (shared with Igor Novikov) and 1999, when the title was shared several ways at Alushta.

In team chess, representing the USSR, he was awarded a team gold and individual bronze medal at the 21st Chess Olympiad, held 1974 in Nice, with a performance of +10 =5 -0, despite being selected only as a reserve.

Gennady Kuzmin was a chess trainer in Ukraine and along with Yuri Kruppa, had helped rising star Kateryna Lahno become the world's youngest Woman Grandmaster. He was also a trainer to Ruslan Ponomariov when he became the youngest (FIDE) world champion in history, at 18 years and 104 days. He ran a chess school on the official website of the Ukraine Chess Federation, where players are invited to join group and individual study sessions.

Kuzmin died on 28 February 2020.

== Notable games ==
- Kuzmin - Sveshnikov, Moscow Ch. 1973, Sicilian Kan, 1-0 Echoes of the famous Lasker - Bauer double bishop sacrifice, performed against a strong grandmaster, with a deadly outcome.
- Kuzmin - Alburt, USSR 1971, Benko Gambit, 1-0 White bravely crashes on with his kingside pawnstorm while his Queenside crumbles.
