= Igor Zaitsev =

Russian chess grandmaster (born 1938)

Personal information
- Born: Igor Arkadyevich Zaitsev; 27 May 1938 (age 88) Ramenskoye, Moscow Oblast, Russian SFSR, Soviet Union

Chess career
- Country: Soviet Union; Russia
- Title: Grandmaster (1976)
- Peak rating: 2520 (July 1971)
- Peak ranking: No. 55 (July 1971)

Igor Arkadyevich Zaitsev (Russian: Игорь Аркадьевич Зайцев; born 27 May 1938) is a Russian grandmaster of chess.

== Early life and family ==
Zaitsev was born in Ramenskoye, a town outside Moscow. His Armenian father, Arkady Gevorgovich Aghaian, was a deputy commander of a warship; his mother, Anna Fyodorovna Zaitseva, was a worker at the Red Banner Textile Factory.

== Chess career ==
In 1969, Zaitsev attained the title of Moscow Champion by defeating Yakov Estrin using the Giuoco Piano opening. The next year, Zaitsev was given the title of International Master and in 1976 he became a Grandmaster.

Zaitsev played in six USSR Chess Championships (1962, 1967, 1968–69, 1969, 1970, 1991), his best finish being joint 1st (coming 2nd after a play-off) in 1968–69.

His results in international tournaments include 2nd at Polanica-Zdrój 1970; 2nd at Dubna 1976; 1st at Quito 1976.

== Contribution to theory ==
Position: a8 black rook, d8 black queen, f8 black rook, g8 black king, b7 black bishop, c7 black pawn, e7 black bishop, f7 black pawn, g7 black pawn, h7 black pawn, a6 black pawn, c6 black knight, d6 black pawn, f6 black knight, b5 black pawn, e5 black pawn, e4 white pawn, b3 white bishop, c3 white pawn, f3 white knight, h3 white pawn, a2 white pawn, b2 white pawn, d2 white pawn, f2 white pawn, g2 white pawn, a1 white rook, b1 white knight, c1 white bishop, d1 white queen, e1 white rook, g1 white king

Ruy Lopez, Flohr–Zaitsev Variation: 9...Bb7

Zaitsev is best known for his contribution to opening theory. His variation of the Ruy Lopez opening (known as the Flohr–Zaitsev Variation, jointly named for Grandmaster Salo Flohr) follows one of the main lines of the Ruy Lopez and remains in wide use today. In the Flohr–Zaitsev Variation, Black plays 9...Bb7 after the moves: 1.e4 e5 2.Nf3 Nc6 3.Bb5 a6 4.Ba4 Nf6 5.0-0 Be7 6.Re1 b5 7.Bb3 d6 8.c3 0-0 9.h3. The move fianchettoes the light-squared bishop, putting pressure on White's pawn on e4.

== Coach ==
Zaitsev became one of the trainers of World Champion Anatoly Karpov in the late 1970s, following the death of Karpov's coach Semyon Furman in March, 1978. Zaitsev was one of Karpov's seconds in a number of his World Championship matches, including the matches against Garry Kasparov in 1984 to 1990.

Karpov popularized Zaitsev's line at the top level, playing it with success for many years.

Zaitsev is Honoured Coach of USSR and Russia. In 2006 he was awarded the title of FIDE Senior Trainer.

== Books ==
- Зайцев, Игорь (2004). Атака в сильном пункте. Советский спорт. ISBN 5-85009-897-6 (in Russian)

== Notable games ==
- Igor Arkadievich Zaitsev vs Anatoli Karpov, Leningrad 1966, Russian Game, Center Variation (C43), ½–½
- Yakov Estrin vs Igor Arkadievich Zaitsev, Moscow 1969, Italian Game: Two Knights Defense, Traxler Counterattack (C57), 0–1
- Igor Arkadievich Zaitsev vs Oleg Dementiev, USSR Championship 1970, Sicilian Defense: Najdorf Variation (B90), 1–0
- Apartsev vs Igor Arkadievich Zaitsev, Moscow 1963, Italian Game: Two Knights Defense. Traxler Counterattack (C57), 0–1
