= Anatoly Bannik =

Ukrainian chess player

Anatoly Alexandrovich Bannik (Ukrainian: Анатолій Олександрович Ба́нник; December 1921, in Kyiv – 19 January 2013 in Straubing) was a Ukrainian chess Master. He was a five-time Ukrainian champion, and qualified for the Soviet Chess Championship final seven times. He was among the top half-dozen Ukrainian players from 1944 to 1966. Bannik spent the last years of his life in Germany, and was active in competitive chess as recently as 2000.

== Biography ==
Anatoly Bannik grew up in Kyiv, and was a childhood friend and chess rival of David Bronstein, later a world challenger. Bannik made his high-level debut at age 18 in the 1940 Ukrainian Chess Championship in Kyiv, placing last in the field of 18 with 5.5/17. The Second World War then cancelled most chess activity in the Soviet Union for the next several years.

Bannik returned to chess with the 1944 Ukrainian Championship in Kyiv, where he scored 7.5/11 to finish in a tie for 3rd–6th places.

Bannik won the Ukrainian Chess Championship five times (1945, 1946, 1951, 1955, and 1964), being the only player who achieved this. He also placed in the top six on another six occasions (1944, 1947, 1948, 1950, 1956, and 1966).

Bannik qualified for the USSR Championship final seven times (1954, 1956, 1957, 1958, 1961, 1962, and 1964), with his best result being 10.5/19 at Yerevan 1962.

Bannik's peak chessmetrics.com rating was 2640 in 1950, #33 in the world.

In the 1947 Championship of the Nauka Club, Bannik scored 6/11 to tie for 4th–5th places. At Moscow 1948, Bannik won the classification tournament 'Candidates to Masters', Group I, with 11.5/15, becoming a Soviet Master. At Vilnius 1949, he placed a fine fourth, with 11/17, behind joint winners Vladas Mikėnas, Semyon Furman, and Alexei Sokolsky. At Riga 1952, he could only make 7.5/17 for a tied 12th–13th place. At Yerevan 1955, he tied 4th–7th with 8/15; the winner was Alexander Kotov. At Kharkov 1956, he scored 11/18 to tie for 4th–5th places; the joint winners were Isaac Boleslavsky and Rashid Nezhmetdinov. At Kyiv 1957, he tied for 2nd–5th places, with 11.5/19; the winner was Tigran Petrosian. He won the USSR Championship semi-final at Kyiv 1960 with 11.5/16; second was Leonid Stein. He also won the Championship of the Spartak Club at Minsk 1962 with 12/17, ahead of Ratmir Kholmov, Alexander Zaitsev, and Alexei Suetin, who all scored 11/17. In the 1963 Championship of the Kyiv Avangard Club, he scored 8/13 to tie for 4th–5th places; the winner was Naum Levin.

Bannik never got the opportunity to compete outside the Soviet Union in an individual tournament. He did play in two team matches for the Soviet Union: he scored 0.5/1 against Bulgaria at Kyiv 1962, and 2/4 against Yugoslavia at Rijeka 1963.

Bannik moved to Germany later in his life, and was active in chess as late as in the year 2000, at age 79, in German team events. In the Niederbayern Team Championship 1999–2000 at Landshut, Bannik scored 7/9.

== Notable chess games ==
- Semyon Furman vs Anatoly Bannik, USSR Championship semi-final, Vilnius 1949, Nimzo-Indian Defence, Rubinstein Variation (E54), 0-1 A very hard endgame grind over the player who would become Karpov's coach.
- Anatoly Bannik vs Vladimir Simagin, USSR Championship semi-final, Vilnius 1949, Ruy Lopez, Marshall Attack (C89), 1-0 Black sacrifices material but his attack slowly grinds to a halt in the face of Bannik's excellent defence.
- Salo Flohr vs Anatoly Bannik, USSR Championship semi-final, Tartu 1950, Catalan System, Open Variation (E02), 0-1 Flohr was a wonder of precise positional play, and a world title Candidate that year, but he meets his match here.
- Anatoly Bannik vs Tigran V. Petrosian, USSR Team Championship, Tbilisi 1951, Nimzo-Indian Defence, Rubinstein Variation (E56), 1-0 Petrosian, who was making his move into the world's elite group of players, simply gets decisively outplayed.
- Alexei Suetin vs Anatoly Bannik, USSR Championship semi-final, Erevan 1954, Ruy Lopez, Closed Variation (C97), 0-1 Lovely precise endgame.
- Anatoly Bannik vs Viktor Korchnoi, USSR Championship, Kyiv 1954, Alekhine's Defence (B02), 1-0 White plays very sharply, with success.
