= Valeriy Neverov =

Ukrainian chess grandmaster (born 1964)

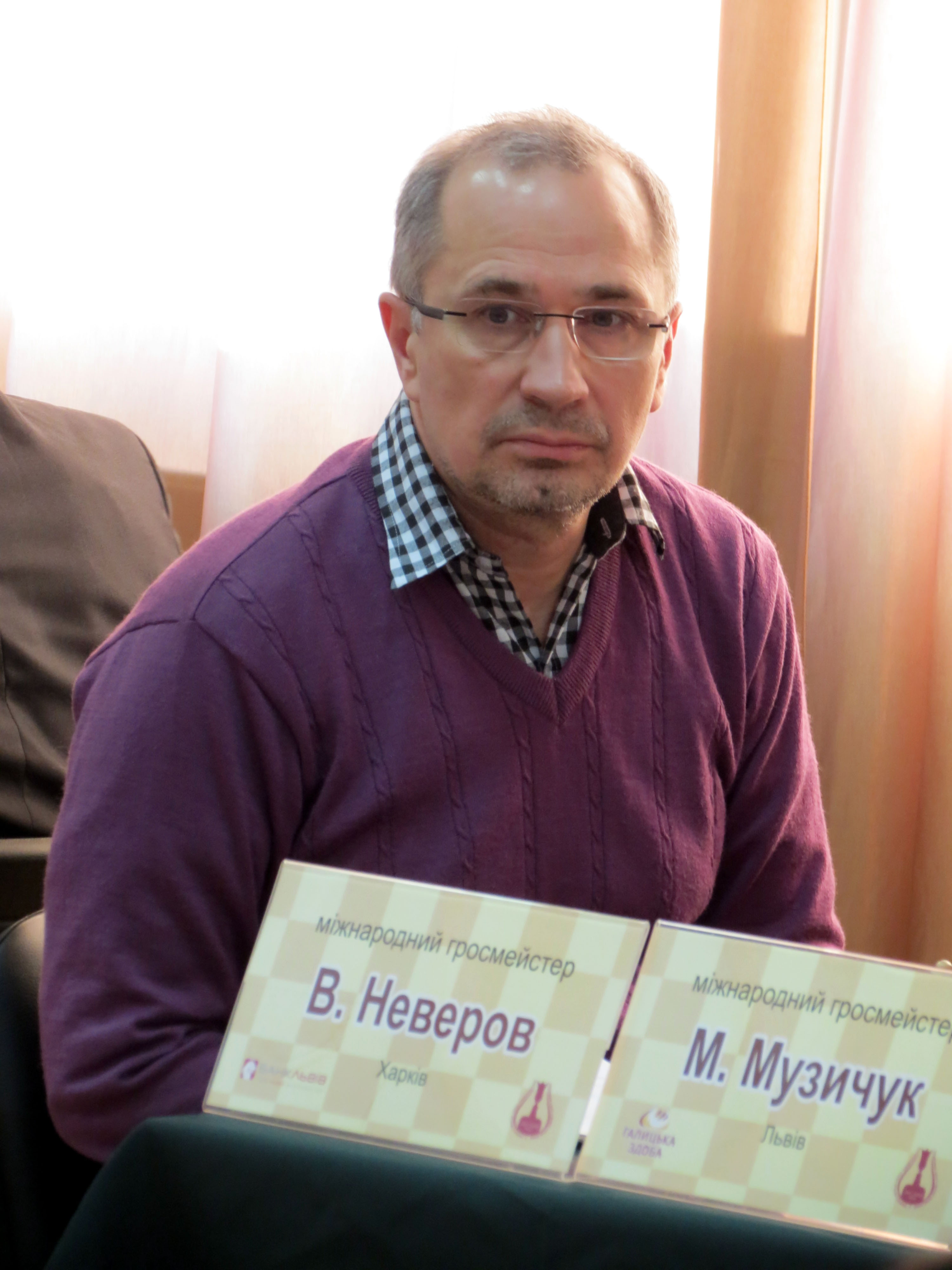
- Neverov at the 2015 Ukrainian Ch., Lviv

Personal information
- Born: 21 June 1964 (age 62) Kharkiv, Ukrainian SSR, Soviet Union

Chess career
- Country: Ukraine
- Title: Grandmaster (1991)
- Peak rating: 2601 (October 2002)
- Peak ranking: No. 98 (October 2002)

Valeriy Neverov (Russian: Валерий Неверов; Ukrainian: Валерій Невєров; born 21 June 1964 in Kharkiv) is a Ukrainian chess grandmaster (1991) and four-time Ukrainian Chess Champion (1983, 1985, 1988 and 1996).

== Chess career ==
In 1991 Neverov won the Capablanca Memorial in Havana, and was a winner of the Politiken Cup in 1994. He played for Ukraine in the 35th Chess Olympiad at Bled 2002. He took part in the FIDE World Chess Championship 2004 but was eliminated in the first round by Shakhriyar Mamedyarov. Neverov won the 2005/06 Hastings International Chess Congress. He tied for first with Merab Gagunashvili in the 2006/07 edition of the same event, and with Nidjat Mamedov and Vadim Malakhatko in 2007/08.
