= Alexey Sokolsky =

Soviet chess player

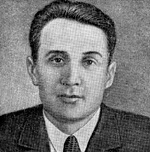
Alexey Sokolsky

Alexey Pavlovich Sokolsky (3 November 1908 Penza Governorate, Russian Empire – 27 December 1969 Minsk, USSR) was a Russian chess player of International Master strength in over-the-board chess, a noted correspondence chess player, and an opening theoretician.

== Chess career ==
In 1935, he took second in the RSFSR Championship. He won the Ukrainian Chess Championship twice, in 1947 and 1948, and was the runner-up in the 1958 Belarusian Chess Championship. He also played in the 13th Soviet Championship in 1944, finishing with 7½/16 (tie for 8th–10th place); the 17th Championship in 1949, finishing with 8½/19 (12th place); and the 21st Championship in 1954, finishing last with 5/19.

He was the first Soviet Correspondence Chess Champion (1948–1951).

== Legacy ==
The name of Sokolsky is known now mostly for his opening research and development of the chess opening 1.b4 which became known as the Sokolsky Opening. It is also known as the Polish Opening or the Orangutan.

Sokolsky Memorial master-norm tournaments have been held regularly in Minsk since 1970.

Sokolsky wrote over a dozen books. The most famous of these are The Modern Openings in Theory and Practice (1962) and Debyut 1.b2-b4 (1963), a book about his eponymous opening.
