= Semyon Furman =

Soviet chess grandmaster (1920–1978)

Personal information
- Born: December 1, 1920 Pinsk, Poland
- Died: March 17, 1978 (aged 57) Leningrad, Soviet Union

Chess career
- Country: Soviet Union
- Title: Grandmaster (1966)
- Peak rating: 2560 (May 1974)
- Peak ranking: No. 26 (January 1976)

Semyon Abramovich Furman (December 1, 1920 – March 17, 1978) was a Soviet chess player and trainer of Belarusian Jewish origin. He was awarded the title of Grandmaster by FIDE in 1966. Furman is best known for developing Anatoly Karpov into a World Chess Champion, but was a formidable player himself, as well as a successful coach for several other world-class players. His name is sometimes written as Semen or Semion Furman.

== Early life ==
Born in Pinsk, Furman was a factory worker in Leningrad, who developed his chess skills in his spare time, and was a late bloomer by chess standards, not reaching even National Master strength until he was well into adulthood. For example, he made only an even score of 6½/13 in the All-Union Candidates-to-Masters tournament, Group 1, at Rostov-on-Don 1939. In the same event at Kalinin 1940, group 3, he was only able to score 5/11, and in the Leningrad Championship of 1940, he scored just 6½/16. His chess development was on hold during the next few years of World War II, as Leningrad was placed under siege by the Nazis, beginning in 1941.

Organized chess started up again as the Second World War ended. In an All-Union Tournament of First Category players at Gorky 1945, Furman posted his first noteworthy result when he tied for first with Konstantin Klaman, at 11/15. At Tula 1945, Furman placed second with 10½/14, behind only V. Lyublinsky. In the Leningrad Championship of 1946, Furman tied for 8th-9th places, with 8½/17. In the USSR Championship semi-final (URS-ch15 sf), Leningrad 1946, Furman was unsuccessful in advancing, but made a highly respectable score of 9/18, to tie for 9th-10th places. He was moving up slowly through the incredibly deep Soviet vanguard.

The year 1947 brought some rewards for Furman. He tied for first place in the All-Union Championship of the Spartak Club, with Vladimir Simagin, at 15/19, but lost the playoff match. Then, in the Leningrad Championship, he tied for 3rd-4th places, with 11/17. At the Saratov 1947 National Tournament, he scored 7/11 for a tied 2nd-3rd place.

== Qualifies for Soviet Championships ==
Furman qualified from the semi-final at Sverdlovsk 1947, for his first Soviet Chess Championship at age 27. In the final, he performed exceptionally well, placing third, only half a point behind joint winners David Bronstein and Alexander Kotov, with a fine score of 11/18 (URS-ch16, Moscow 1948). In the Leningrad Championship of 1948, he tied for 7th-10th places, with 9½/17. He tied for first-third places at Vilnius 1949, the semi-final for URS-ch17, with 11½/17, qualifying again for the Soviet final. In the Leningrad Championship of 1949, he was off form with 8½/18 to tie for 11th-13th places. Then, in the Soviet final later in 1949, again in Moscow (URS-ch17), he tied for 5th-7th places with 11½/19. In the 1950 Championship of the Spartak Club, he tied for 4th-5th places, with 6/11. Then at Gorky 1950, he was unsuccessful in qualifying for the next Soviet Championship final, as he could only score 9½/15, for fourth place.

In the URS-ch21 at Kiev 1954, Furman scored 10/19 to tie for 7th-9th places. He earned his first international tournament opportunity for Bucharest 1954, where he tied for 6th-7th places with a fine 10/17. He was in the middle of the field in URS-ch22 at Moscow 1955, with 10/19, in a tie for 10th-11th places. It was a similar story for URS-ch24, Moscow 1957, where he scored 10/21 for 12th place. He had a good tournament at Kiev 1957, scoring 11½/19 to tie for 2nd-5th places, behind only Tigran Petrosian. His form dropped for URS-ch25, Riga 1958, as he could only make 6/18 for 17th place. At URS-ch26, Tbilisi 1959, he was again below 50 per cent with 8/19 for 15th place.

Furman gradually proved he belonged in the upper echelon of the extraordinarily deep Soviet chess elite, with many victories over top players. He placed equal fourth in the 1965 Soviet Championship. Furman was awarded the International Master (IM) title in 1954. He won the Leningrad Championship in 1953, 1954, and 1957 (jointly).

== Grandmaster, and coach to the stars ==
Furman did not become a Grandmaster until 1966, at age 46, after his fine first-place result at Harrachov. It was difficult in those years for all but the very top Soviet players to travel abroad to international tournaments, where titles could be earned, and Furman had few opportunities. He did play for the USSR in the 1961 European Team Championship at Oberhausen on board ten, scoring 4/7, and contributing to the overall gold medal team victory.

Bronstein faced Furman in the 1948 Soviet Championship, won the game, but was impressed with Furman's skill. Bronstein wrote, in his acclaimed book The Sorcerer's Apprentice (page 102): "Later, when I recognised the logical play of Furman, I invited him to be my assistant during preparation for the match [against World Champion Mikhail Botvinnik] in 1951. Also, I took him abroad as my second to the Interzonal Tournament in Gothenburg in 1955 and the Candidates' Tournament in Amsterdam 1956."

Furman had been one of the assistants to Botvinnik in his 1963 world title match against Tigran Petrosian, according to Anatoly Karpov, writing in his autobiography Karpov on Karpov. Botvinnik played many training games with Furman, to prepare for Botvinnik's 1960 and 1961 World Championship matches; these matches only became public many years afterwards, when Botvinnik published the games, which are now available on various databases. Furman and Botvinnik at that time were both members of the Trud (Trade Unions) Club. Later Furman switched to the Army Sports Club. Furman also assisted world-class players such as Viktor Korchnoi (according to both Bronstein and Karpov) and Efim Geller (according to Karpov).

The site Chessmetrics.com, which endeavors to provide historical ratings for players while correcting for different methods of calculation, puts Furman's peak rating at 2708 in April, 1948, #11 in the world at that time. That is certain Grandmaster level, but, because of lack of international opportunities, Furman did not formally receive the title until eighteen years later. According to chessmetrics, his best tournament from a performance rating standpoint was Gorky 1954 (5½/6, for a 2755 performance).

== Trains the world champion ==
It was in a training role that Furman first met the young Anatoly Karpov, who at age seventeen was representing the Army Sports club on the junior board at the 1968 Soviet Team Championships, held in Riga. In training, the two got along well, and Karpov made the outstanding score of 10/11. Furman was assigned to prepare Karpov (who gave his whole-hearted approval) for further competitions, such as the Soviet Junior qualifying match-tournament, Leningrad 1969, which Karpov won. This win earned Karpov the Soviet berth in the 1969 World Junior Chess Championship, held in Stockholm. Karpov also won this tournament with a dominating performance; it was the first Soviet win at that level since Boris Spassky in 1955.

From this stage on, Furman worked ever more closely with Karpov, who moved from Moscow to Leningrad, switching universities as well, from Moscow State University to Leningrad State University, to be nearer to Furman. The two also became close friends, with Karpov actually assisting Furman, upon his request, for the 1969 Soviet Chess Championship, held in Moscow; Karpov had not qualified to play in it. Karpov earned the Grandmaster title at Caracas 1970. He qualified for the Soviet Championship for the first time in 1970, scoring well. Karpov drew a 1971 secret training match with Korchnoi, a world title Candidate. His rise continued, with wins at the very strong Moscow 1971, Hastings 1971-72, and San Antonio 1972 tournaments. Karpov made the Soviet national team for the 1972 Skopje Chess Olympiad as first reserve, and scored 13½/16, winning gold on his board, and helping the USSR to win the team gold.

Because Furman had earlier worked with Korchnoi, Karpov was able to utilize this situation to good effect to win his vital 1974 World Chess Championship Candidates final match against Korchnoi, who had earlier fallen out with Furman over a dispute around a 1971 match against Geller. Korchnoi had wanted Furman to assist him against Geller, but Furman and Geller were teammates at the Army Club, so Furman withdrew his training services on principle, as Furman had also helped to train Geller. This made Korchnoi bitter towards Furman, and their connection ended, even though Korchnoi went on to defeat Geller. So, a full-time training spot opened up with Furman, which Karpov took. Karpov wrote that Korchnoi did not realize at the time the strength of Karpov's potential challenge to him.

As Karpov built further successes, and was earning favour in the Soviet sports bureaucracy, he was able to arrange for Furman to compete with him sometimes in the same international tournaments, such as Madrid 1973, Ljubljana/Portorož 1975, and Bad Lauterberg 1977, all of which Karpov won. Furman also performed well, taking or tying for third place at all three of Madrid, Ljubljana / Portoroz, and Bad Lauterberg.

Furman was awarded the Honoured Trainer of the USSR in 1973 for his work with young players. He served as trainer to the combined Soviet teams to the 1974 Nice Olympiad and the 1977 European Team Championship in Moscow.

In his autobiographical book, Karpov on Karpov, published in 1991, Karpov credits Furman extensively with helping him scale the heights of grandmaster chess, culminating in his World Championship in 1975 and superb play for the next decade, as he dominated the game. This book is perhaps the most detailed work ever published on the relationship between a top chess player and his coach. The two also played a great deal of bridge together; this game became for a time something of an obsession with Furman.

Bronstein, who had worked with Furman earlier, wrote "When Furman started to work with Anatoly Karpov, I was not surprised by the young grandmaster's success, showing a brilliant understanding of grandmaster strategy. It was obvious that Furman had passed on to him a lot of the knowledge acquired during his earlier years. It should also be said that Furman had very good analytical powers and was able to look deeply into the games of other grandmasters, disclosing the secrets of their success."

Furman's health had not been good since the mid-1960s, however. He had survived one operation for stomach cancer, but the cancer returned, and he died at Leningrad in 1978, just before Karpov's match with Korchnoi for the World Championship. Karpov wrote that he missed Furman's help greatly during that match, which he won only narrowly (+6−5=21).

== Success as coach ==
Furman may have been the most successful coach in the history of chess, although some would give that title to Mark Dvoretsky. Chess culture has traditionally and typically credited the player for chess success, with the coach recognized in a much lesser fashion, or not at all. Chess coaches were not commonly seen for top players until the post-World War II period, when competition became much stiffer. They were first developed in the Soviet Union and in other Eastern European countries; it is no coincidence that top players from these nations have dominated chess for the past sixty years. Furman, with a very significant role in Karpov's development from his late teens, building upon earlier roles with World Champion Botvinnik and world-class players such as Bronstein, Korchnoi, and Geller, may have done more than any other coach, from the early 1950s until the late 1970s, to help ensure Soviet dominance.

== Legacy ==
Furman was an exceptional openings specialist, and was respected as being of virtually world-class strength with the White pieces, with which he scored most of his wins over the top players, as the game selection shows. He was sometimes referred to as "the world champion when playing White." He could not score anywhere near as well as Black, and this held back his success. While best remembered today as Karpov's trainer, Furman also made many important contributions to the success of other top players, such as Bronstein, Botvinnik, Korchnoi, and Geller. He developed several significant improvements to opening theory. He favoured the closed openings (1.d4, 1.c4, 1.Nf3) as White, and in many of his wins over top-class rivals, his opponents were simply unable to generate counterplay, and were slowly strangled by Furman's precise, yet amorphous strategy. Karpov noted that a book on Furman's career and best games would be well received and valuable; Karpov wrote such a book in 1988, Semyon Furman, in Russian. as part of the Small Black series. The book consisted of a Biography, 115 mostly annotated games, indexes of players and openings.

== Notable chess games ==
- Semyon Furman vs Efim Geller, Leningrad 1947, Queen's Gambit, Semi-Slav Defence (D46), 1-0 Furman shows the rising star Geller a few things about precise positional play, and catches him in a nifty tactic to win a piece.
- Semyon Furman vs Paul Keres, USSR Championship, Moscow 1948, Queen's Indian Defence (E15), 1-0 Keres was one of the world's top three players, and for Furman, the humble factory worker, wins like these meant that he had arrived near the top.
- Semyon Furman vs Vasily Smyslov, USSR Championship, Moscow 1949, Grunfeld Defence, Exchange Variation (D88), 1-0 Smyslov had finished second in the World Championship the year before, and would become the joint Soviet champion for 1949.
- Semyon Furman vs Tigran Petrosian, USSR Championship, Moscow 1949, King's Indian Defence, Fianchetto Variation (E68), 1-0 Petrosian was just making his debut at top level; he would go on to become world champion.
- Semyon Furman vs Viktor Korchnoi, Leningrad 1953, English Opening (A16), 1-0 Furman would later become a coach for Korchnoi.
- Semyon Furman vs Ratmir Kholmov, USSR Championship, Kiev 1954, Queen's Gambit, Tarrasch Defence (D30), 1-0 Rising star Kholmov became almost unbeatable a few years later.
- Semyon Furman vs Boris Spassky, USSR Championship, Moscow 1955, Nimzo-Indian Defence, Rubinstein Variation (E59), 1-0 Another future World Champion learns to respect Furman's talent.
- Duncan Suttles vs Semyon Furman, Polanica Zdroj 1967, Van Geet Opening (A00), 0-1 Suttles was known for his unconventional opening play, but he can't disorient the veteran Furman.
- Semyon Furman vs David Bronstein, Leningrad vs Moscow match 1967, Queen's Gambit Declined (D50), 1-0 Furman takes care of business against one of his former charges.
- Semyon Furman vs Mikhail Tal, USSR Championship, Moscow 1969, Queen's Pawn Game (A40), 1-0 Former World Champion Tal sacrifices the exchange, but doesn't get enough for it.
- Semyon Furman vs Lev Polugaevsky, Moscow 1969, Queen's Indian Defence (E14), 1-0 The reigning Soviet champion takes one on the chin.
- Semyon Furman vs Leonid Stein, USSR 1971, English Opening, Symmetrical (A39), 1-0 Stein was a three-time Soviet champion, but couldn't handle Furman in this game.
- Ulf Andersson vs Semyon Furman, Madrid 1973, English Opening (A15), 0-1 One of the new generation of young stars gets taken care of quite expeditiously.
- Semyon Furman vs Svetozar Gligoric, Bad Lauterberg 1977, King's Indian Defence, Saemisch Variation (E88), 1-0 Gligoric is a world authority on the King's Indian, but his learning process is extended a bit further by Furman.
- Anthony Miles vs Semyon Furman, Bad Lauterberg 1977, English Opening (A16), 0-1 Furman was ill and spotting Miles 35 years, but wins anyway as Miles gets simply outclassed.
