= Vladimir Savon =

Ukrainian chess grandmaster (1940–2005)

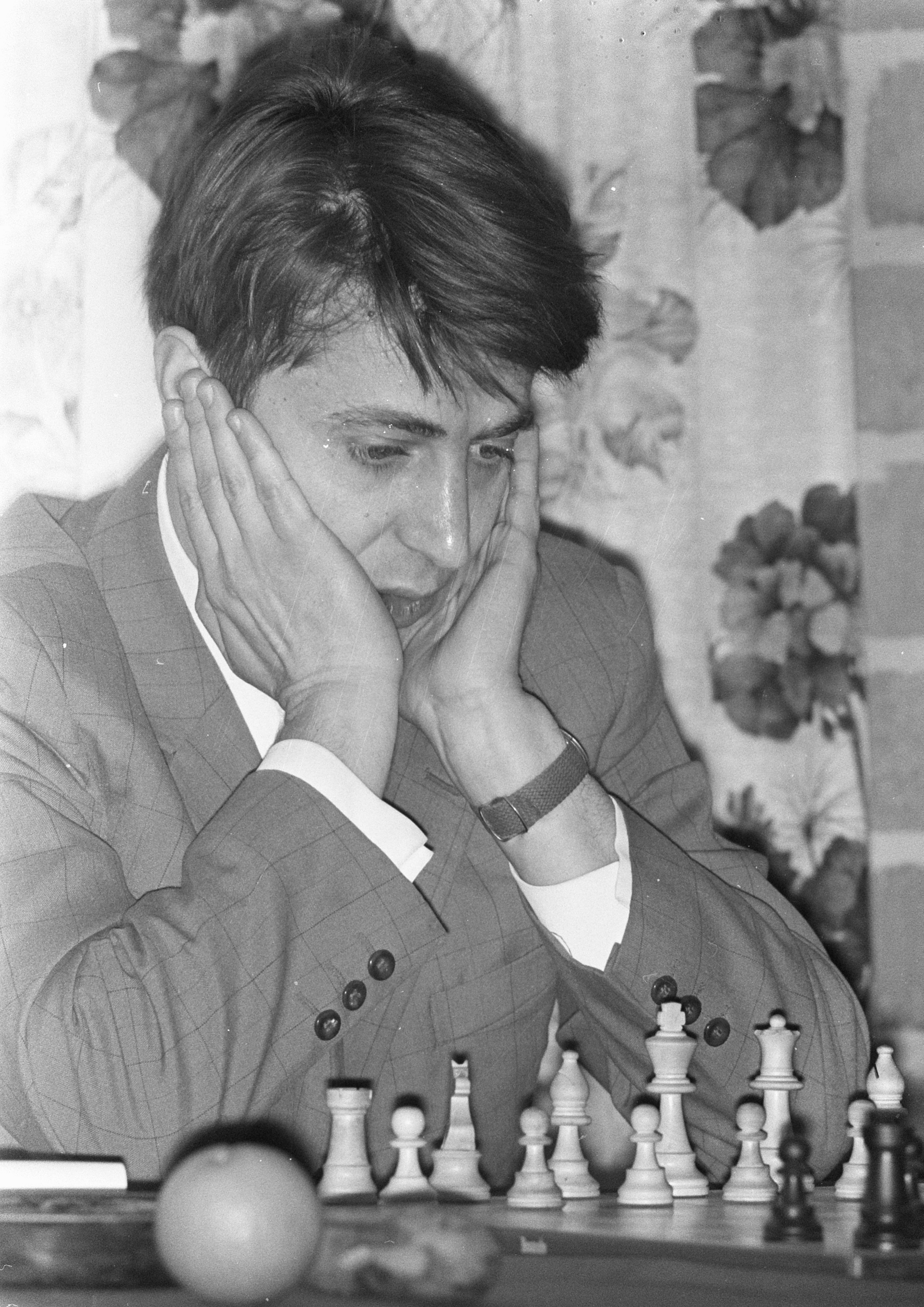
- Savon in 1972

Personal information
- Born: 26 September 1940 Chernihiv, Ukrainian SSR, Soviet Union
- Died: 1 June 2005 (aged 64) Kharkiv, Ukraine

Chess career
- Country: Ukraine
- Title: Grandmaster (1973)
- Peak rating: 2590 (July 1972)
- Peak ranking: No. 15 (July 1972)

Vladimir Andreyevich Savon (Ukrainian: Володи́мир Андрійович Саво́н; 26 September 1940 – 1 June 2005) was a Ukrainian chess player. He was awarded the title of Grandmaster by FIDE in 1973.

Savon shared the Ukrainian Chess Championship in 1969 and won the USSR Championship in 1971. He competed in the 1972 Chess Olympiad.

== Biography ==
Born in Chernihiv, he learned how to play at the age of 13.

Savon competed in the Soviet championship eleven times, from 1961 (at age 21) to the last championship in 1991. His best result was his first place in the 1971 championship with an undefeated 15/21. Only an international master, he finished 1.5 points ahead of former world champions Mikhail Tal and Vasily Smyslov. Future world champion Anatoly Karpov finished another half point back. Taimanov and Bernard Cafferty, in their book on the Soviet championships, described Savon's win "the least plausible result for decades".

One possible factor was the distraction of Fischer's Candidates matches. It was claimed that Fischer's 6–0 wins against Larsen and Taimanov had hypnotised the top Soviet players, who were now following Petrosian's similar demise in the Candidates match that was to finish only days after this tournament.

Savon's next-best result in the Soviet championship came the following year, when he tied for 3rd–5th and qualified for the Interzonal.

He did, however, achieve other good results in international competition; at Debrecen in 1970 (1st= with Bilek), at Sukhumi 1972 (2nd after Tal), at Vilnius 1975 (1st=), at Portorož 1977 (2nd= with Hort, after Larsen) and at Kyiv 1978 (2nd=).

FIDE awarded Savon the International Master title in 1967, and the International Grandmaster title in 1973. In the latter year, he finished eighth out of 18 at the Petropolis Interzonal. He shared the title of Ukrainian Champion with Gennady Kuzmin in 1969. In 1980 while at a chess tournament at Dnepropetrovsk, Savon suffered a serious head injury. It has led to a significant decline in his playing strength.

He died in Kharkiv at the age of 65.

== Notable games ==
From the 39th USSR Championship 1971, rd. 13, Savon-Roman Dzindzichashvili 1.e4 c5 2.Nf3 e6 3.d4 cxd4 4.Nxd4 Nf6 5.Nc3 d6 6.g4 h6 7. Rg1 Nc6 8. Be3 a6 9.h3 Bd7 10.f4 Qc7 11.Qd2 b5 12.Bd3 Nxd4 13.Bxd4 Bc6 14.Qe2 e5 15.Nd5 Nxd5 16.exd5 Bxd5 17.fxe5 0-0-0 18.0-0-0 Qc6 19.Rgf1 dxe5 20.Bxe5 f6 21.Bf5+ Kb7 22.Rxd5 Rxd5 23.Be4 Bc5 24.Rd1 Ka7 25.Bxd5 Qe8 26.Be6 fxe5 27. Qxe5 1-0

From Leningrad 1971, Yuri Balashov-Savon 1.d4 Nf6 2.c4 c5 3.d5 e6 4.Nc3 exd5 5.cxd5 d6 6.Nf3 g6 7.e4 Bg7 8.Be2 0-0 9.0-0 Bg4 10.Bf4 Re8 11.Qc2 Na6 12.h3 Bxf3 13.Bxf3 Qb6 14.b3 Nd7 15.a3 Bd4 16.Rad1 Ne5 17.Be2 Rac8 18.Na4 Qd8 19.Bb5 Rf8 20.Bh6 Nc7 21.Bxf8 Nxb5 22.Bh6 Nxa3 23.Qc1 Nb5 24.Be3 Nd7 25.Rde1 Qe7 26.Bxd4 Nxd4 27.Re3 b5 28.Nc3 Nxb3 29.Qa3 Nd4 30.Qxa7 b4 31.Qa6 Rb8 32.Na4 Nc2 33.Re2 b3 34.Rb1 Kg7 35.Nc3 Nd4 36.Re3 Nc2 37.Re2 Nd4 38.Re3 Rb6 39.Qf1 Nc2 40.Rg3 Nf6 41.Qd3 Rb4 42.f4 Rd4 43.Qe2 c4 44.e5 dxe5 45.fxe5 Ne4 46.Nxe4 Qxe5 47.Rf1 Rxe4 48.Qf3 f5 0-1
