= 1991 USSR Chess Championship =

Last edition of USSR Chess Championship

58th USSR Chess Championship
- Location: Moscow

Champion
- Artashes Minasian

The 1991 Soviet Chess Championship was the 58th and last edition of USSR Chess Championship. It was held from 1–13 November 1991 in Moscow. The title was won by the Armenian Artashes Minasian.

== Crosstable ==
The 58th and final Championship produced perhaps the greatest surprise of the whole series. There were a few big names in the field at Moscow, which was run as an 11-round Swiss system with 64 players. For example, there was Mikhail Tal, but he was seriously ill and finished only 39th-46th on 5 points. Leonid Yudasin, soon to emigrate to Israel, also finished with 5. Alexey Shirov got only 6½. Two little-known players shared the top with 8½, but the title went to the 24-year-old Armenian Artashes Minasian who had met much the stronger opposition and so having a better tiebreak, while Elmar Magerramov from Baku was second.

58th USSR Chess Championship
| | Player | Rating | 1 | 2 | 3 | 4 | 5 | 6 | 7 | 8 | 9 | 10 | 11 | Total |
|---|---|---|---|---|---|---|---|---|---|---|---|---|---|---|
| 1 | (Soviet Union) Artashes Minasian | 2510 | +12 | =4 | +40 | +6 | =7 | +24 | +26 | -2 | =3 | +23 | +10 | 8½ |
| 2 | (Soviet Union) Elmar Magerramov | 2560 | =31 | =32 | =45 | +58 | =5 | +21 | +29 | +1 | +25 | +4 | =3 | 8½ |
| 3 | (Soviet Union) Vladimir Epishin | 2615 | =42 | =15 | +50 | =29 | =4 | =30 | +51 | +28 | =1 | +25 | =2 | 7½ |
| 4 | (Soviet Union) Viktor Bologan | 2535 | +39 | =1 | +27 | =5 | =3 | =28 | +11 | =7 | +6 | -2 | =13 | 7 |
| 5 | (Soviet Union) Sergei Rublevsky | 2420 | =22 | =14 | +59 | =4 | =2 | +41 | =19 | -6 | +35 | =9 | +18 | 7 |
| 6 | (Soviet Union) Sergey Kiselev | 2510 | +38 | +26 | =24 | -1 | =23 | +46 | =25 | +5 | -4 | +15 | =7 | 7 |
| 7 | (Soviet Union) Vadim Ruban | 2575 | +57 | -24 | +16 | +34 | =1 | =29 | =28 | =4 | =23 | +17 | =6 | 7 |
| 8 | (Soviet Union) Alexander Nenashev | 2475 | =30 | =20 | =51 | +12 | =21 | -26 | +50 | =36 | =28 | +27 | +19 | 7 |
| 9 | (Soviet Union) Alexey Vyzmanavin | 2590 | -27 | +54 | =42 | =15 | =57 | +34 | =24 | +29 | =17 | =5 | +22 | 7 |
| 10 | (Soviet Union) Andrei Kharlov | 2515 | +41 | =23 | =25 | =30 | =18 | -19 | =13 | +40 | +44 | +11 | -1 | 6½ |
| 11 | (Soviet Union) Artur Frolov | 2470 | +49 | +50 | =23 | =26 | =24 | =25 | -4 | =16 | +30 | -10 | +37 | 6½ |
| 12 | (Soviet Union) Rafael Vaganian | 2585 | -1 | +48 | =22 | -8 | =58 | -39 | +53 | +63 | +43 | =14 | +25 | 6½ |
| 13 | (Soviet Union) Alexei Shirov | 2610 | =15 | =42 | -34 | -33 | +59 | +58 | =10 | +24 | =27 | +28 | =4 | 6½ |
| 14 | (Soviet Union) Sergei Tiviakov | 2535 | =62 | =5 | =60 | +47 | -29 | =16 | =20 | =32 | +39 | =12 | +23 | 6½ |
| 15 | (Soviet Union) Alexey Kuzmin | 2520 | =13 | =3 | =18 | =9 | =43 | +40 | +52 | =23 | =36 | -6 | =20 | 6 |
| 16 | (Soviet Union) Vladimir Kramnik | 2490 | =44 | =18 | -7 | +59 | =35 | =14 | +37 | =11 | =19 | =20 | =29 | 6 |
| 17 | (Soviet Union) Vladimir Malaniuk | 2510 | -23 | =41 | +36 | =20 | =46 | +45 | =30 | +26 | =9 | -7 | =21 | 6 |
| 18 | (Soviet Union) Vladimir Akopian | 2590 | =34 | =16 | =15 | +42 | =10 | =51 | =27 | =30 | =33 | +26 | -5 | 6 |
| 19 | (Soviet Union) Michal Krasenkow | 2550 | =32 | =31 | =58 | =45 | +60 | +10 | =5 | -25 | =16 | +33 | -8 | 6 |
| 20 | (Soviet Union) Igor Novikov | 2550 | =63 | =8 | =43 | =17 | =33 | =57 | =14 | =22 | +32 | =16 | =15 | 6 |
| 21 | (Soviet Union) Sergey Makarichev | 2535 | =56 | =43 | +53 | =52 | =8 | -2 | =32 | =39 | =24 | +44 | =17 | 6 |
| 22 | (Soviet Union) Valery Chekhov | 2525 | =5 | =60 | =12 | =41 | =63 | +31 | -23 | =20 | +46 | +36 | -9 | 6 |
| 23 | (Soviet Union) Alexey Dreev | 2610 | +17 | =10 | =11 | =27 | =6 | =52 | +22 | =15 | =7 | -1 | -14 | 5½ |
| 24 | (Soviet Union) Oleg Nikolenko | 2450 | +59 | +7 | =6 | =28 | =11 | -1 | =9 | -13 | =21 | =35 | =30 | 5½ |
| 25 | (Soviet Union) Alexander Shabalov | 2535 | =47 | +61 | =10 | +32 | =28 | =11 | =6 | +19 | -2 | -3 | -12 | 5½ |
| 26 | (Soviet Union) Yuri Yakovich | 2560 | +48 | -6 | +33 | =11 | =27 | +8 | -1 | -17 | +29 | -18 | =31 | 5½ |
| 27 | (Soviet Union) Sergey Ionov | 2510 | +9 | =40 | -4 | =23 | =26 | +44 | =18 | =35 | =13 | -8 | =36 | 5½ |
| 28 | (Soviet Union) Leonid Yurtaev | 2525 | =60 | +62 | +47 | =24 | =25 | =4 | =7 | -3 | =8 | -13 | =32 | 5½ |
| 29 | (Soviet Union) Konstantin Aseev | 2525 | =61 | +64 | =52 | =3 | +14 | =7 | -2 | -9 | -26 | +42 | =16 | 5½ |
| 30 | (Soviet Union) Yury Dokhoian | 2545 | =8 | =63 | +56 | =10 | =52 | =3 | =17 | =18 | -11 | =43 | =24 | 5½ |
| 31 | (Soviet Union) Vladimir Bagirov | 2485 | =2 | =19 | =35 | =44 | =40 | -22 | =41 | =37 | =50 | +51 | =26 | 5½ |
| 32 | (Soviet Union) Ildar Ibragimov | 2485 | =19 | =2 | +37 | -25 | -51 | +64 | =21 | =14 | -20 | +59 | =28 | 5½ |
| 33 | (Soviet Union) Grigory Serper | 2490 | =36 | =46 | -26 | +13 | =20 | =50 | =39 | +51 | =18 | -19 | =35 | 5½ |
| 34 | (Soviet Union) Maxim Sorokin | 2510 | =18 | =44 | +13 | -7 | =41 | -9 | -47 | +64 | =38 | =40 | +50 | 5½ |
| 35 | (Soviet Union) Evgeny Sveshnikov | 2540 | =45 | =58 | =31 | =60 | =16 | +55 | =36 | =27 | -5 | =24 | =33 | 5½ |
| 36 | (Soviet Union) Smbat Lputian | 2570 | =33 | -52 | -17 | +61 | +53 | +63 | =35 | =8 | =15 | -22 | =27 | 5½ |
| 37 | (Soviet Union) Nukhim Rashkovsky | 2540 | =58 | =45 | -32 | =39 | =54 | +60 | -16 | =31 | +57 | +47 | -11 | 5½ |
| 38 | (Soviet Union) Yuri Balashov | 2590 | -6 | -57 | -39 | =48 | +61 | =53 | +58 | =42 | =34 | =41 | +43 | 5½ |
| 39 | (Soviet Union) Boris Kantsler | 2430 | -4 | -59 | +38 | =37 | =49 | +12 | =33 | =21 | -14 | =50 | =46 | 5 |
| 40 | (Soviet Union) Vereslav Eingorn | 2585 | +54 | =27 | -1 | =57 | =31 | -15 | +45 | -10 | =52 | =34 | =48 | 5 |
| 41 | (Soviet Union) Leonid Yudasin | 2595 | -10 | =17 | +62 | =22 | =34 | -5 | =31 | =50 | =42 | =38 | =44 | 5 |
| 42 | (Soviet Union) Alexandar Budnikov | 2525 | =3 | =13 | =9 | -18 | =64 | =43 | =63 | =38 | =41 | -29 | +57 | 5 |
| 43 | (Soviet Union) Peter Korzubov | 2455 | =51 | =21 | =20 | -46 | =15 | =42 | +55 | +57 | -12 | =30 | -38 | 5 |
| 44 | (Soviet Union) Mikhail Ulybin | 2565 | =16 | =34 | =57 | =31 | =45 | -27 | +54 | +52 | -10 | -21 | =41 | 5 |
| 45 | (Soviet Union) Marat Makarov | 2475 | =35 | =37 | =2 | =19 | =44 | -17 | -40 | =61 | =55 | =57 | +59 | 5 |
| 46 | (Soviet Union) Mikhail Tal | 2575 | =52 | =33 | =63 | +43 | =17 | -6 | =57 | =47 | -22 | =48 | =39 | 5 |
| 47 | (Soviet Union) Evgeni Maljutin | 2435 | =25 | +55 | -28 | -14 | =50 | =54 | +34 | =46 | =51 | -37 | =49 | 5 |
| 48 | (Soviet Union) Alexandar Panchenko | 2490 | -26 | -12 | -54 | =38 | +62 | =49 | =60 | =55 | +61 | =46 | =40 | 5 |
| 49 | (Soviet Union) Konstantin Lerner | 2540 | -11 | -53 | =64 | =62 | =39 | =48 | =61 | =59 | =63 | +52 | =47 | 5 |
| 50 | (Soviet Union) Semen Dvoirys | 2525 | +53 | -11 | -3 | +56 | =47 | =33 | -8 | =41 | =31 | =39 | -34 | 4½ |
| 51 | (Soviet Union) Alexander Schneider | 2540 | =43 | =56 | =8 | =63 | +32 | =18 | -3 | -33 | =47 | -31 | =54 | 4½ |
| 52 | (Soviet Union) Konstantin Sakaev | 2495 | =46 | +36 | =29 | =21 | =30 | =23 | -15 | -44 | =40 | -49 | =55 | 4½ |
| 53 | (Soviet Union) Jakob Meister | 2430 | -50 | +49 | -21 | =55 | -36 | =38 | -12 | -56 | =62 | +64 | +63 | 4½ |
| 54 | (Soviet Union) German Titov | 2505 | -40 | -9 | +48 | =64 | =37 | =47 | -44 | -60 | =58 | +63 | =51 | 4½ |
| 55 | (Soviet Union) Ruslan Shcherbakov | 2525 | =64 | -47 | =61 | =53 | +56 | -35 | -43 | =48 | =45 | =60 | =52 | 4½ |
| 56 | (Soviet Union) Aleksej Aleksandrov | 2450 | =21 | =51 | -30 | -50 | -55 | -61 | -59 | +53 | +64 | =62 | +60 | 4½ |
| 57 | (Soviet Union) Igor Naumkin | 2490 | -7 | +38 | =44 | =40 | =9 | =20 | =46 | -43 | -37 | =45 | -42 | 4 |
| 58 | (Soviet Union) Vladimir Savon | 2460 | =37 | =35 | =19 | -2 | =12 | -13 | -38 | =62 | =54 | =61 | =64 | 4 |
| 59 | (Soviet Union) Valeriy Neverov | 2540 | -24 | +39 | -5 | -16 | -13 | =62 | +56 | =49 | +60 | -32 | -45 | 4 |
| 60 | (Soviet Union) Igor Zaitsev | 2405 | =28 | =22 | =14 | =35 | -19 | -37 | =48 | +54 | -59 | =55 | -56 | 4 |
| 61 | (Soviet Union) Michail Brodsky | 2415 | =29 | -25 | =55 | -36 | -38 | +56 | =49 | =45 | -48 | =58 | =62 | 4 |
| 62 | (Soviet Union) Andrei Lukin | 2445 | =14 | -28 | -41 | =49 | -48 | =59 | =64 | =58 | =53 | =56 | =61 | 4 |
| 63 | (Soviet Union) Yuri Kruppa | 2485 | =20 | =30 | =46 | =51 | =22 | -36 | =42 | -12 | =49 | -54 | -53 | 3½ |
| 64 | (Soviet Union) Maxim Novik | 2405 | =55 | -29 | =49 | =54 | =42 | -32 | =62 | -34 | -56 | -53 | =58 | 3 |
