= 1957 USSR Chess Championship =

Soviet chess tournament

24th Soviet Chess Championship (1957)
- Location: Moscow

Champion
- Mikhail Tal

The 1957 Soviet Chess Championship was the 24th edition of USSR Chess Championship. Held from 20 January to 22 February 1957 in Moscow. The tournament was won by Mikhail Tal. The final were preceded by quarterfinals events at Frunze (won by Viktor Korchnoi, 17 points in 18 games), Tallinn (Iivo Nei/Alexey Suetin, 14/19), Yerevan (Alexander Tolush, 15½/19); semifinals at Leningrad (Abram Khasin, 11½/19), Kharkov (Vitaly Tarasov, 11½/18) and Tbilisi (Tigran Petrosian, 14½/19).

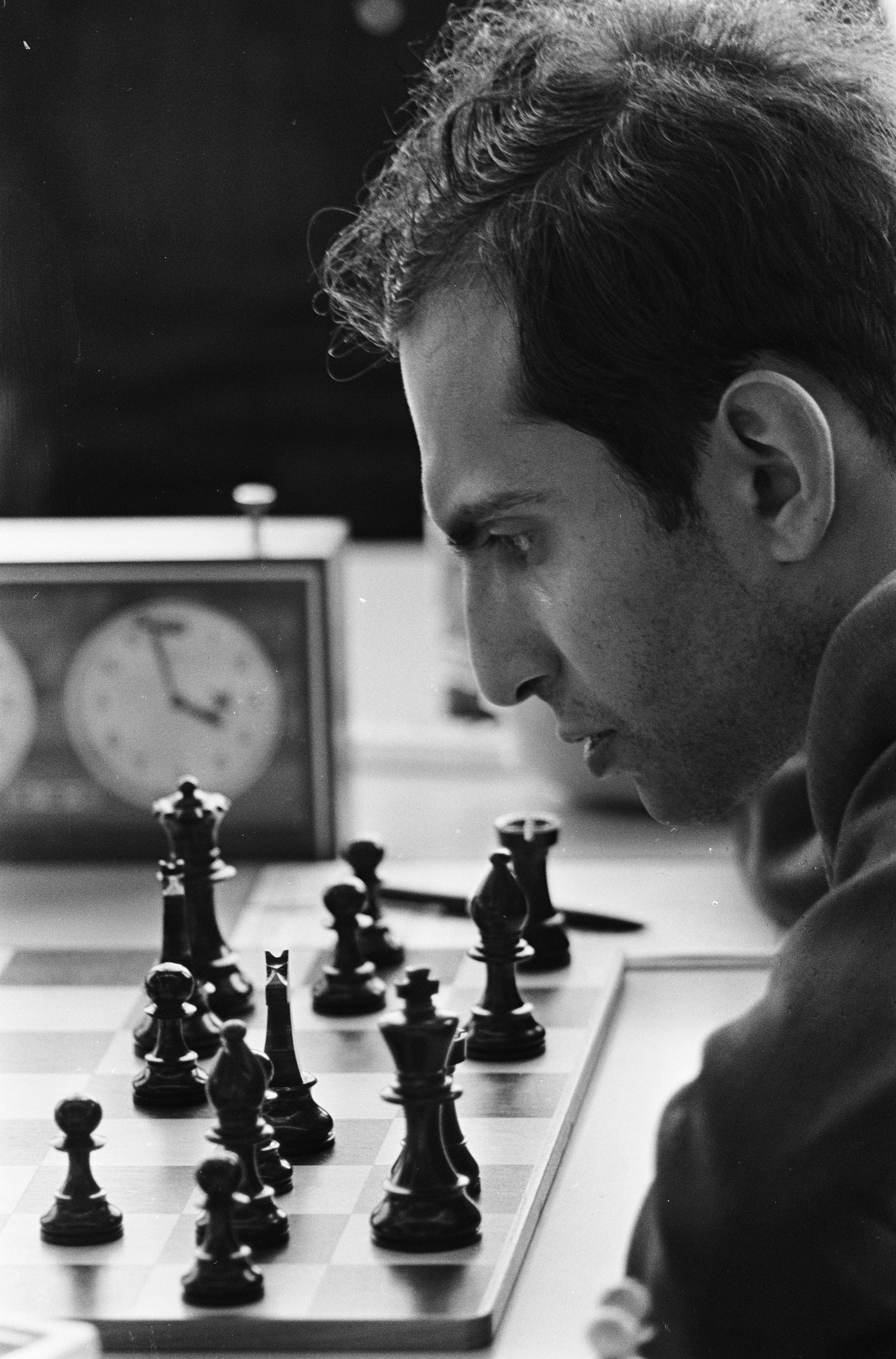
Mikhail Tal

== Table and results ==
=== Semifinals ===
Tbilisi semifinal, 24th Soviet Chess Championship
	Player	1	2	3	4	5	6	7	8	9	10	11	12	13	14	15	16	17	18	19	20	Total
1	(Soviet Union) Tigran Petrosian	-	½	½	½	½	1	1	½	1	½	½	1	½	½	1	1	1	1	1	1	14½
2	(Soviet Union) Semyon Furman	½	-	½	½	½	½	½	½	½	½	½	½	1	½	1	1	½	1	1	1	12½
3	(Soviet Union) Vladimir Antoshin	½	½	-	1	½	½	½	1	½	0	1	½	1	1	0	½	½	1	½	1	12
4	(Soviet Union) Viktor Korchnoi	½	½	0	-	½	½	0	1	1	½	½	½	½	½	1	1	1	½	1	1	12
5	(Soviet Union) Mikhail Tal	½	½	½	½	-	½	1	1	½	0	½	0	1	½	½	½	1	½	1	1	11½
6	(Soviet Union) Bukhuti Gurgenidze	0	½	½	½	½	-	½	0	1	½	0	1	½	1	1	1	1	½	½	1	11½
7	(Soviet Union) Nikolai Krogius	0	½	½	1	0	½	-	0	1	1	½	½	½	½	1	½	½	½	1	1	11
8	(Soviet Union) Jacob Yuchtman	½	½	0	0	0	1	1	-	½	½	1	½	½	1	1	½	0	½	½	1	10½
9	(Soviet Union) Lev Polugaevsky	0	½	½	0	½	0	0	½	-	1	½	½	½	½	½	1	1	1	1	1	10½
10	(Soviet Union) Alexander Buslaev	½	½	1	½	1	½	0	½	0	-	½	½	0	½	0	1	1	½	1	½	10
11	(Soviet Union) Yuri Kotkov	½	½	0	½	½	1	½	0	½	½	-	½	½	½	½	½	1	1	½	½	10
12	(Soviet Union) Vladlen Zurakhov	0	½	½	½	1	0	½	½	½	½	½	-	½	1	0	½	½	1	1	½	10
13	(Soviet Union) Sultan Khalilbeili	½	0	0	½	0	½	½	½	½	1	½	½	-	½	½	1	1	½	½	1	10
14	(Soviet Union) Alexander Koblencs	½	½	0	½	½	0	½	0	½	½	½	0	½	-	½	½	1	1	1	1	9½
15	(Soviet Union) Yuri Sakharov	0	0	1	0	½	0	0	0	½	1	½	1	½	½	-	0	½	1	0	½	7½
16	(Soviet Union) Eduard Gufeld	0	0	½	0	½	0	½	½	0	0	½	½	0	½	1	-	½	1	1	½	7½
17	(Soviet Union) Egor Chukaev	0	½	½	0	0	0	½	1	0	0	0	½	0	0	½	½	-	1	1	0	6
18	(Soviet Union) Boris Voronkov	0	0	0	½	½	½	½	½	0	½	0	0	½	0	0	0	0	-		1	4½
19	(Soviet Union) Genrikh Kasparian	0	0	½	0	0	½	0	½	0	0	½	0	½	0	1	0	0		-	1	4½
20	(Soviet Union) Tengiz Giorgadze	0	0	0	0	0	0	0	0	0	½	½	½	0	0	½	½	1	0	0	-	3½

Leningrad semifinal, 24th Soviet Chess Championship
	Player	1	2	3	4	5	6	7	8	9	10	11	12	13	14	15	16	17	18	19	20	Total
1	(Soviet Union) Abram Khasin	-	1	1	½	½	½	1	1	1	0	½	0	½	½	½	0	½	1	1	½	11½
2	(Soviet Union) Konstantin Klaman	0	-	½	0	1	½	1	½	½	1	1	1	1	½	½	½	0	½	1	½	11½
3	(Soviet Union) Alexander Tolush	0	½	-	½	½	1	1	1	0	0	1	½	½	1	1	½	½	½	½	1	11½
4	(Soviet Union) Lev Aronin	½	1	½	-	½	½	½	0	½	½	0	½	1	1	½	½	1	½	1	1	11½
5	(Soviet Union) Boris Spassky	½	0	½	½	-	½	½	½	½	0	0	1	½	1	½	1	1	1	1	1	11½
6	(Soviet Union) Efim Stoliar	½	½	0	½	½	-	0	½	½	1	½	1	1	½	1	0	1	0	1	1	11
7	(Soviet Union) Vladas Mikenas	0	0	0	½	½	1	-	1	½	1	½	0	½	½	½	1	1	1	1	½	11
8	(Soviet Union) Vasily Byvshev	0	½	0	1	½	½	0	-	1	½	½	0	½	½	1	½	1	½	1	1	10½
9	(Soviet Union) Pavel Kondratyev	0	½	1	½	½	½	½	0	-	½	½	1	½	0	1	½	1	½	0	1	10
10	(Soviet Union) Nikolay Novotelnov	1	0	1	½	1	0	0	½	½	-	½	½	0	1	½	1	0	½	½	1	10
11	(Soviet Union) Viatcheslav Osnos	½	0	0	1	1	½	½	½	½	½	-	½	½	1	0	½	0	1	½	1	10
12	(Soviet Union) Grigory Goldberg	1	0	½	½	0	0	1	1	0	½	½	-	0	0	½	1	1	½	1	½	9½
13	(Soviet Union) Georgy Lisitsin	½	0	½	0	½	0	½	½	½	1	½	1	-	0	½	½	½	½	1	1	9½
14	(Soviet Union) Dmitry Rovner	½	½	0	0	0	½	½	½	1	0	0	1	1	-	½	½	0	1	1	1	9½
15	(Soviet Union) Alexander Kotov	½	½	0	½	½	0	½	0	0	½	1	½	½	½	-	1	½	1	0	1	9
16	(Soviet Union) Alexander Geller	1	½	½	½	0	1	0	½	½	0	½	0	½	½	0	-	½	1	½	½	8½
17	(Soviet Union) Israel Zilber	½	1	½	0	0	0	0	0	0	1	1	0	½	1	½	½	-	½	½	1	8½
18	(Soviet Union) Viacheslav Ragozin	0	½	½	½	0	1	0	½	½	½	0	½	½	0	0	0	½	-	½	1	7
19	(Soviet Union) Iosef Slepoy	0	0	½	0	0	0	0	0	1	½	½	0	0	0	1	½	½	½	-	½	5½
20	(Soviet Union) Yakov Neishtadt	½	½	0	0	0	0	½	0	0	0	0	½	0	0	0	½	0	0	½	-	3

Kharkov semifinal, 24th Soviet Chess Championship
	Player	1	2	3	4	5	6	7	8	9	10	11	12	13	14	15	16	17	18	19	Total
1	(Soviet Union) Vitaly Tarasov	-	½	½	½	½	½	½	½	½	½	1	½	½	½	½	1	1	1	1	11½
2	(Soviet Union) Rashid Nezhmetdinov	½	-	½	½	½	0	½	0	0	1	1	1	1	1	½	1	½	1	1	11½
3	(Soviet Union) Ratmir Kholmov	½	½	-	½	1	½	½	0	1	1	0	0	1	1	½	½	1	1	½	11
4	(Soviet Union) Isaac Boleslavsky	½	½	½	-	½	½		½	½	1	½	½	½	1	1	½	½	1	1	11
5	(Soviet Union) Lev Aronson	½	½	0	½	-	½	½	1	½	½	1	1	½	½	1	0	1	1	0	10½
6	(Soviet Union) Georgy Borisenko	½	1	½	½	½	-	0	½	1	½	0	0	1	½	1	1	½	1	½	10½
7	(Soviet Union) Anatoly Bannik	½	½	½		½	1	-	1	0	0	1	½	½	½	0	1	1	1	1	10½
8	(Soviet Union) Janis Klavins	½	1	1	½	0	½	0	-	½	1	1	0	0	0	½	1	½	1	1	10
9	(Soviet Union) Iivo Nei	½	1	0	½	½	0	1	½	-	0	½	½	½	½	1	1	0	1	1	10
10	(Soviet Union) Evgeni Vasiukov	½	0	0	0	½	½	1	0	1	-	0	1	½	1	1	½	½	1	1	10
11	(Soviet Union) Alexey Suetin	0	0	1	½	0	1	0	0	½	1	-	1	1	0	½	1	1	0	1	9½
12	(Soviet Union) Peter Romanovsky	½	0	1	½	0	1	½	1	½	0	0	-	0	1	1	0	½	0	1	8½
13	(Soviet Union) Alexander Chistiakov	½	0	0	½	½	0	½	1	½	½	0	1	-	1	½	0	1	0	½	8
14	(Soviet Union) Yury Vasilchuk	½	0	0	0	½	½	½	1	½	0	1	0	0	-	½	1	½	0	1	7½
15	(Soviet Union) Leonid Shamkovich	½	½	½	0	0	0	1	½	0	0	½	0	½	½	-	1	½	½	1	7½
16	(Soviet Union) Arkady Makarov	0	0	½	½	1	0	0	0	0	½	0	1	1	0	0	-	1	½	1	7
17	(Soviet Union) Abram Zamikhovsky	0	½	0	½	0	½	0	½	1	½	0	½	0	½	½	0	-	½	0	5½
18	(Soviet Union) Iosif Livshin	0	0	0	0	0	0	0	0	0	0	1	1	1	1	½	½	½	-	0	5½
19	(Soviet Union) Avshalom Matskevich	0	0	½	0	1	½	0	0	0	0	0	0	½	0	0	0	1	1	-	4½

Bannik and Aroson beat Borisenko in a sixth place tiebreaker tournament.

=== Final ===
The semi-final qualifiers joined Taimanov, Keres and Bronstein (who entered the final directly by ranking criteria of the Soviet Federation) to play the final in Moscow. Mikhail Botvinnik and Vasily Smyslov did not participate because they were preparing for the match for the World Championship.

Moscow Final, 24th Soviet Chess Championship
	Player	1	2	3	4	5	6	7	8	9	10	11	12	13	14	15	16	17	18	19	20	21	22	Total
1	(Soviet Union) Mikhail Tal	-	1	1	½	1	½	½	1	0	½	1	½	0	1	1	½	½	½	1	½	½	1	14
2	(Soviet Union) Paul Keres	0	-	½	0	1	½	½	½	1	½	½	1	½	1	½	1	½	½	1	½	1	1	13½
3	(Soviet Union) David Bronstein	0	½	-	½	0	½	½	½	½	1	½	½	1	½	1	1	1	1	0	1	1	1	13½
4	(Soviet Union) Boris Spassky	½	1	½	-	½	½	½	½	½	½	½	1	0	½	0	½	1	1	1	½	1	1	13
5	(Soviet Union) Alexander Tolush	0	0	1	½	-	0	½	0	½	1	1	1	½	½	1	1	0	1	½	1	1	1	13
6	(Soviet Union) Ratmir Kholmov	½	½	½	½	1	-	½	1	½	0	0	½	½	½	1	½	1	½	½	1	½	1	12½
7	(Soviet Union) Viktor Korchnoi	½	½	½	½	½	½	-	½	1	0	½	½	1	½	½	0	1	0	1	1	1	½	12
8	(Soviet Union) Tigran Petrosian	0	½	½	½	1	0	½	-	½	½	1	0	½	0	1	1	1	½	½	½	1	1	12
9	(Soviet Union) Isaac Boleslavsky	1	0	½	½	½	½	0	½	-	½	½	½	1	½	½	½	½	1	½	½	1	½	11½
10	(Soviet Union) Lev Aronin	½	½	0	½	0	1	1	½	½	-	½	1	½	0	0	½	½	1	1	½	0	1	11
11	(Soviet Union) Mark Taimanov	0	½	½	½	0	1	½	0	½	½	-	½	½	½	1	1	½	½	1	1	0	½	11
12	(Soviet Union) Semyon Furman	½	0	½	0	0	½	½	1	½	0	½	-	½	1	½	1	1	0	0	1	½	½	10
13	(Soviet Union) Rashid Nezhmetdinov	1	½	0	1	½	½	0	½	0	½	½	½	-	½	0	1	1	0	1	0	½	0	9½
14	(Soviet Union) Anatoly Bannik	0	0	½	½	½	½	½	1	½	1	½	0	½	-	1	½	½	0	0	½	½	½	9½
15	(Soviet Union) Konstantin Klaman	0	½	0	1	0	0	½	0	½	1	0	½	1	0	-	0	½	1	1	½	½	1	9½
16	(Soviet Union) Vladimir Antoshin	½	0	0	½	0	½	1	0	½	½	0	0	0	½	1	-	0	1	1	½	½	1	9
17	(Soviet Union) Efim Stoliar	½	½	0	0	1	0	0	0	½	½	½	0	0	½	½	1	-	½	½	1	½	½	8½
18	(Soviet Union) Vladas Mikenas	½	½	0	0	0	½	1	½	0	0	½	1	1	1	0	0	½	-	1	0	0	0	8
19	(Soviet Union) Bukhuti Gurgenidze	0	0	1	0	½	½	0	½	½	0	0	1	0	1	0	0	½	0	-	1	1	0	7½
20	(Soviet Union) Abram Khasin	½	½	0	½	0	0	0	½	½	½	0	0	1	½	½	½	0	1	0	-	1	0	7½
21	(Soviet Union) Vitaly Tarasov	½	0	0	0	0	½	0	0	0	1	1	½	½	½	½	½	½	1	0	0	-	½	7½
22	(Soviet Union) Lev Aronson	0	0	0	0	0	0	½	0	½	0	½	½	1	½	0	0	½	1	1	1	½	-	7½
