= Denis Yevseev =

Russian chess grandmaster (born 1973)

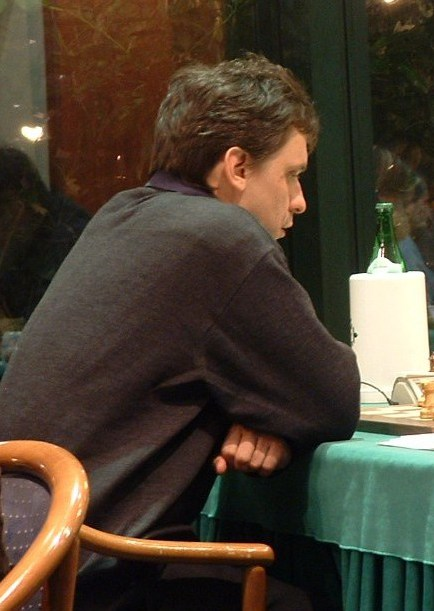

Personal information
- Born: July 3, 1973 (age 53) Murmansk, Soviet Union

Chess career
- Country: Soviet Union (until 1991); Russia (since 1991)
- Title: Grandmaster (2003)
- FIDE rating: 2474 (July 2026)
- Peak rating: 2592 (October 2003)

Denis Sergeevich Yevseev is a Russian chess grandmaster.

== Chess career ==
In April 2008, he tied for 3rd–7th with Rauf Mamedov, Dmitry Andreikin, Vasily Yemelin and Eltaj Safarli in the Chigorin Memorial.

He won the Leningrad City Chess Championship in 2013 and 2014; he won outright in 2013 and defeated Valerij Popov in tiebreak scores in 2014.

In 2015, he began coaching Kirill Shubin, who later won the European Youth Chess Championship.

In May 2016, he played for the Peter's Boat club (alongside Alexander Khalifman, Maksim Chigaev, Ivan Rozum, Marat Askarov and Kirill Shubin) in the higher league division of the Russian Club Championship. The team finished in third place.
