= 1965 USSR Chess Championship =

Soviet chess tournament

33rd Soviet Chess Championship
- Location: Tallinn

Champion
- Leonid Stein

The 1965 Soviet Chess Championship was the 33rd edition of USSR Chess Championship, held from 24 November 1965 to 24 December 1965 in Tallinn. The tournament was won by Leonid Stein. The finals were preceded by semifinals events at Leningrad and Omsk.

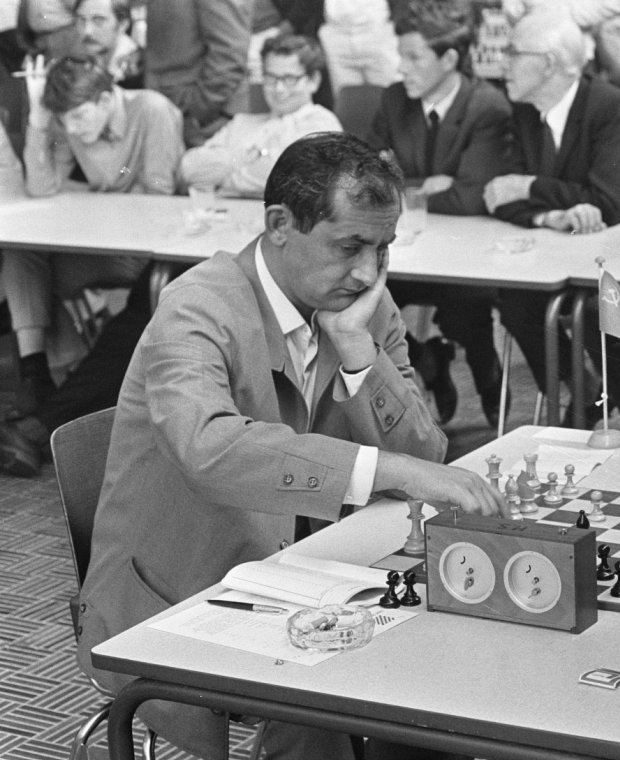
Leonid Stein

== Table and results ==
33rd Soviet Chess Championship
N°	Player	1	2	3	4	5	6	7	8	9	10	11	12	13	14	15	16	17	18	19	20	Total
1	(Soviet Union) Leonid Stein	-	1	½	½	½	½	0	1	½	½	½	1	1	1	1	1	1	1	½	1	14
2	(Soviet Union) Lev Polugaevsky	0	-	½	1	½	½	½	½	1	½	1	1	1	1	½	½	½	1	1	1	13½
3	(Soviet Union) Mark Taimanov	½	½	-	0	½	1	1	½	1	1	½	1	1	0	1	½	½	½	1	1	13
4	(Soviet Union) Semyon Furman	½	0	1	-	0	½	0	½	½	1	½	1	1	1	1	1	½	½	1	0	11½
5	(Soviet Union) Alexey Suetin	½	½	½	1	-	0	½	½	½	½	1	½	½	½	0	1	1	1	½	1	11½
6	(Soviet Union) Paul Keres	½	½	0	½	1	-	½	½	½	½	½	1	½	½	½	½	1	1	½	½	11
7	(Soviet Union) Yuri Sakharov	1	½	0	1	½	½	-	½	1	0	1	0	1	½	0	½	½	1	0	1	10½
8	(Soviet Union) Viatcheslav Osnos	0	½	½	½	½	½	½	-	½	½	0	0	1	½	1	½	½	1	½	1	10
9	(Soviet Union) David Bronstein	½	0	0	½	½	½	0	½	-	½	1	½	½	½	½	½	½	½	1	1	9½
10	(Soviet Union) Vladimir Simagin	½	½	0	0	½	½	1	½	½	-	0	0	0	1	½	½	½	1	1	½	9
11	(Soviet Union) Anatoly Bykhovsky	½	0	½	½	0	½	0	1	0	1	-	½	0	1	½	½	½	1	0	1	9
12	(Soviet Union) Viktor Korchnoi	0	0	0	0	½	0	1	1	½	1	½	-	½	½	0	1	0	½	1	1	9
13	(Soviet Union) Abram Khasin	0	0	0	0	½	½	0	0	½	1	1	½	-	0	1	½	½	½	1	1	8½
14	(Soviet Union) Evgeni Vasiukov	0	0	1	0	½	½	½	½	½	0	0	½	1	-	1	½	½	½	½	0	8
15	(Soviet Union) Eduard Bukhman	0	½	0	0	1	½	1	0	½	½	½	1	0	0	-	0	1	½	0	1	8
16	(Soviet Union) Eduard Gufeld	0	½	½	0	0	½	½	½	½	½	½	0	½	½	1	-	1	0	½	½	8
17	(Soviet Union) Vladimir Liavdansky	0	½	½	½	0	0	½	½	½	½	½	1	½	½	0	0	-	½	1	½	8
18	(Soviet Union) Gennadi Kuzmin	0	0	½	½	0	0	0	0	½	0	0	½	½	½	½	1	½	-	1	1	7
19	(Soviet Union) Vladas Mikenas	½	0	0	0	½	½	1	½	0	0	1	0	0	½	1	½	0	0	-	½	6½
20	(Soviet Union) Vladimir Lepeshkin	0	0	0	1	0	½	0	0	0	½	0	0	0	1	0	½	½	0	½	-	4½
