= 1961 USSR Chess Championship (28th) =

Soviet chess tournament

28th Soviet Chess Championship
- Location: Moscow

Champion
- Tigran Petrosian

The 1961 Soviet Chess Championship - 28th edition was held from 11 January to 11 February 1961 in Moscow. The tournament was won by Tigran Petrosian. The final were preceded by semifinals events at Odessa, Rostov and Vilnius. This was also a Zonal tournament with four Interzonal places on offer. 1961 was the year of two Soviet Chess Championships, the 28th and the 29th editions.

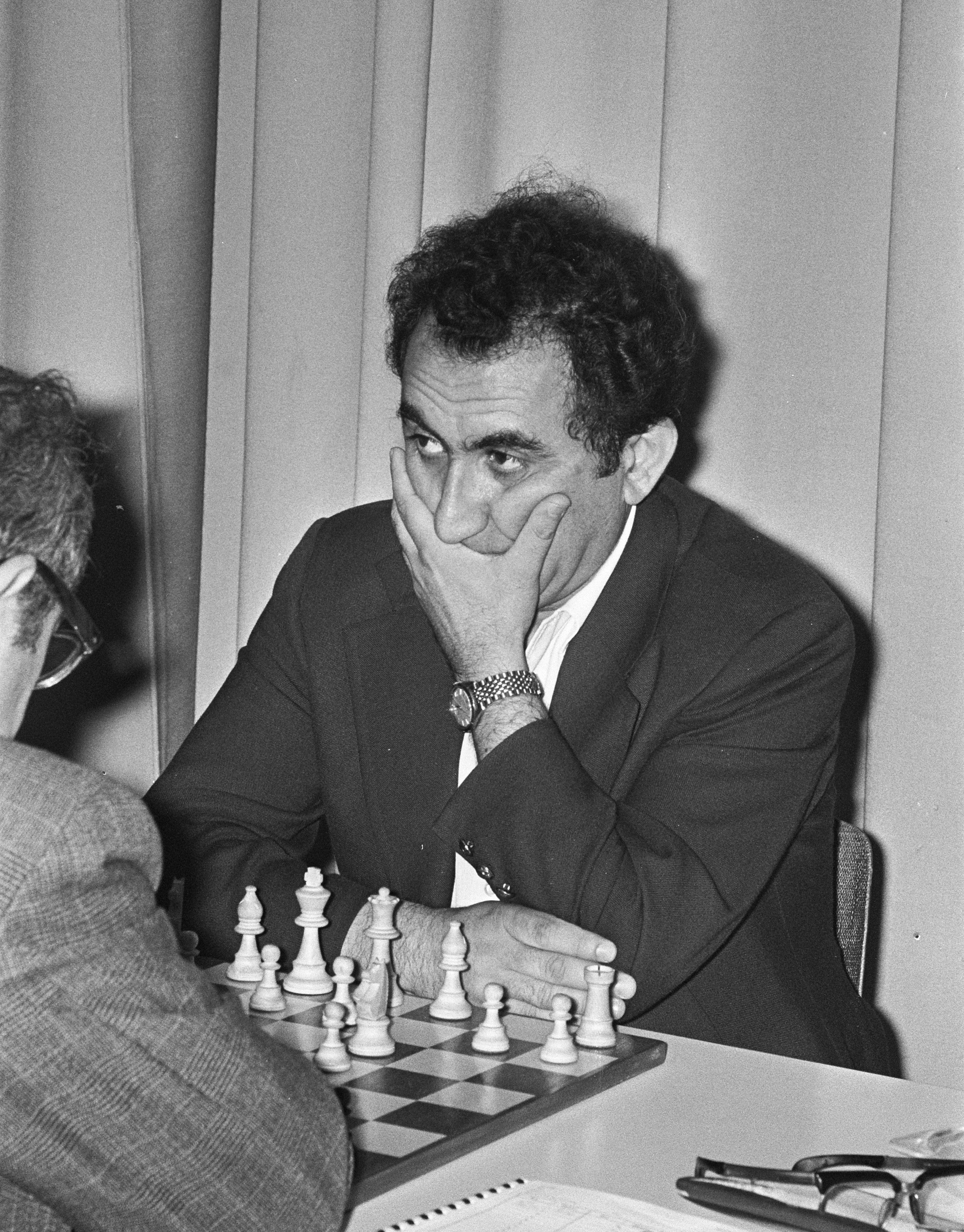
Tigran Petrosian

== Table and results ==
28th Soviet Chess Championship
	Player	1	2	3	4	5	6	7	8	9	10	11	12	13	14	15	16	17	18	19	20	Total
1	(Soviet Union) Tigran Petrosian	-	1	0	½	1	½	½	1	½	1	1	½	½	1	1	1	½	½	1	½	13½
2	(Soviet Union) Viktor Korchnoi	0	-	½	½	0	1	½	1	½	1	1	1	½	1	½	½	½	1	1	1	13
3	(Soviet Union) Leonid Stein	1	½	-	1	½	1	½	0	0	½	0	1	½	½	1	1	1	½	½	1	12
4	(Soviet Union) Efim Geller	½	½	0	-	1	½	½	1	1	1	0	0	½	1	½	1	1	½	½	1	12
5	(Soviet Union) Vassily Smyslov	0	1	½	0	-	½	½	½	1	1	½	½	½	½	1	½	½	1	½	½	11
6	(Soviet Union) Boris Spassky	½	0	0	½	½	-	1	0	0	½	1	1	½	1	½	1	½	1	½	1	11
7	(Soviet Union) Yuri Averbakh	½	½	½	½	½	0	-	½	0	1	1	½	½	½	½	½	½	½	1	1	10½
8	(Soviet Union) Lev Polugaevsky	0	0	1	0	½	1	½	-	0	½	½	½	½	1	½	1	½	1	1	½	10½
9	(Soviet Union) Vladimir Simagin	½	½	1	0	0	1	1	1	-	½	½	0	½	½	1	0	0	1	½	½	10
10	(Soviet Union) Mark Taimanov	0	0	½	0	0	½	0	½	½	-	1	1	1	0	½	1	1	1	1	½	10
11	(Soviet Union) Semyon Furman	0	0	1	1	½	0	0	½	½	0	-	½	1	1	½	½	1	0	½	1	9½
12	(Soviet Union) David Bronstein	½	0	0	1	½	0	½	½	1	0	½	-	1	0	1	½	½	0	1	½	9
13	(Soviet Union) Isaac Boleslavsky	½	½	½	½	½	½	½	½	½	0	0	0	-	½	½	½	½	1	½	1	9
14	(Soviet Union) Eduard Gufeld	0	0	½	0	½	0	½	0	½	1	0	1	½	-	1	½	0	½	1	½	8
15	(Soviet Union) Alexander Cherepkov	0	½	0	½	0	½	½	½	0	½	½	0	½	0	-	1	1	1	0	½	7½
16	(Soviet Union) Anatoly Lutikov	0	½	0	0	½	0	½	0	1	0	½	½	½	½	0	-	½	½	1	1	7½
17	(Soviet Union) Vitaly Tarasov	½	½	0	0	½	½	½	½	1	0	0	½	½	1	0	½	-	0	0	½	7
18	(Soviet Union) Georgy Borisenko	½	0	½	½	0	0	½	0	0	0	1	1	0	½	0	½	1	-	½	0	6½
19	(Soviet Union) Abram Khasin	0	0	½	½	½	½	0	0	½	0	½	0	½	0	1	0	1	½	-	½	6½
20	(Soviet Union) Anatoly Bannik	½	0	0	0	½	0	0	½	½	½	0	½	0	½	½	0	½	1	½	-	6
