= 1968 USSR Chess Championship =

Soviet chess tournament

36th Soviet Chess Championship
- Location: Alma-Ata

Champion
- Lev Polugaevsky

The 1968 Soviet Chess Championship was the 36th edition of USSR Chess Championship. Held from 30 December 1968 to 1 February 1969 in Alma-Ata. The tournament was won by Lev Polugaevsky who defeated Alexander Zaitsev in a play-off match. The non-attendance of stars such as David Bronstein, Tigran Petrosian, Boris Spassky, all away at foreign tournaments made it not too strong an event, especially in conjunction with the absence of Paul Keres. Mikhail Tal was ill again, after a year in which he spent a lot of time in hospital under observation.

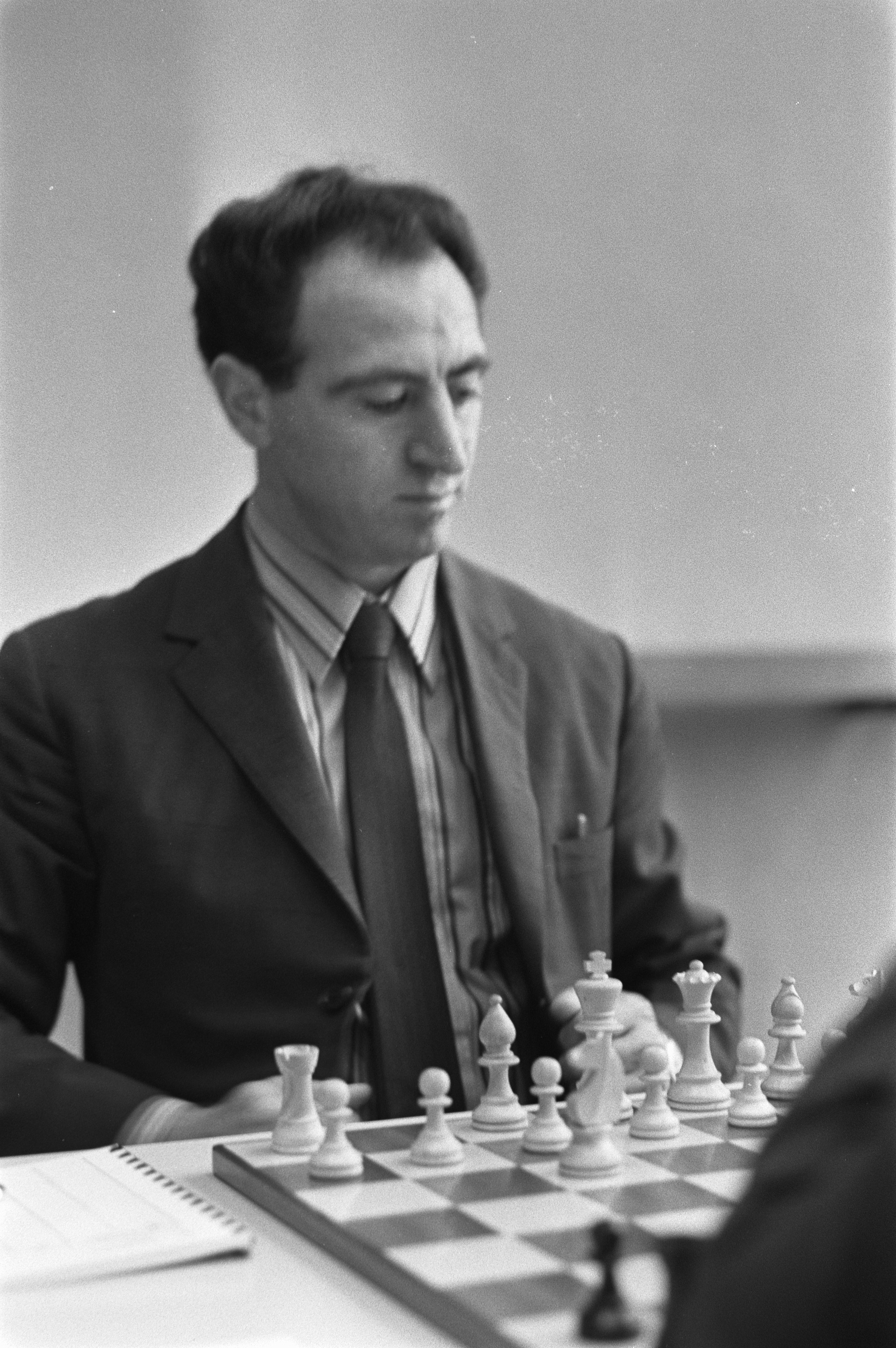
Lev Polugaevsky

== Table and results ==
36th Soviet Chess Championship
	Player	1	2	3	4	5	6	7	8	9	10	11	12	13	14	15	16	17	18	19	20	Total
1	(Soviet Union) Alexander Zaitsev	-	½	1	½	1	½	½	½	1	½	½	1	½	½	½	½	½	1	½	1	12½
2	(Soviet Union) Lev Polugaevsky	½	-	1	1	½	½	1	½	½	½	½	0	1	½	½	½	1	½	1	1	12½
3	(Soviet Union) Anatoly Lutikov	0	0	-	0	0	½	½	1	1	0	1	½	1	1	1	½	½	1	1	1	11½
4	(Soviet Union) Vladimir Liberzon	½	0	1	-	0	½	½	½	½	1	1	0	½	1	½	1	½	1	½	½	11
5	(Soviet Union) Vitaly Tseshkovsky	0	½	1	1	-	½	½	0	½	1	0	½	½	1	1	0	1	0	1	1	11
6	(Soviet Union) Ratmir Kholmov	½	½	½	½	½	-	½	½	0	1	½	½	1	½	½	½	½	1	½	½	10½
7	(Soviet Union) Mikhail Podgaets	½	0	½	½	½	½	-	½	1	½	0	½	½	½	½	1	1	½	½	1	10½
8	(Soviet Union) Mikhail Tal	½	½	0	½	1	½	½	-	0	0	½	½	1	½	½	1	1	0	1	1	10½
9	(Soviet Union) Janis Klovans	0	½	0	½	½	1	0	1	-	1	½	½	½	0	½	1	0	1	1	1	10½
10	(Soviet Union) Evgeni Vasiukov	½	½	1	0	0	0	½	1	0	-	½	½	0	½	½	1	1	1	1	1	10½
11	(Soviet Union) Anatoly Lein	½	½	0	0	1	½	1	½	½	½	-	1	0	1	0	½	½	1	½	½	10
12	(Soviet Union) Yuri Averbakh	0	1	½	1	½	½	½	½	½	½	0	-	½	0	½	½	½	1	1	½	10
13	(Soviet Union) Viatcheslav Osnos	½	0	0	½	½	0	½	0	½	1	1	½	-	1	½	½	1	½	½	1	10
14	(Soviet Union) Yuri Sakharov	½	½	0	0	0	½	½	½	1	½	0	1	0	-	1	½	0	½	1	1	9
15	(Soviet Union) Vladimir Bagirov	½	½	0	½	0	½	½	½	½	½	1	½	½	0	-	0	½	½	½	1	8½
16	(Soviet Union) Bukhuti Gurgenidze	½	½	½	0	1	½	0	0	0	0	½	½	½	½	1	-	½	½	1	½	8½
17	(Soviet Union) Igor Zaitsev	½	0	½	½	0	½	0	0	1	0	½	½	0	1	½	½	-	1	½	1	8½
18	(Soviet Union) Igor Platonov	0	½	0	0	1	0	½	1	0	0	0	0	½	½	½	½	0	-	½	1	6½
19	(Soviet Union) Alexander Cherepkov	½	0	0	½	0	½	½	0	0	0	½	0	½	0	½	0	½	½	-	0	4½
20	(Soviet Union) Yury Nikitin	0	0	0	½	0	½	0	0	0	0	½	½	0	0	0	½	0	0	1	-	3½

=== Play-off ===
March 1969
Player	1	2	3	4	5	6	Total
(Soviet Union) Lev Polugaevsky	½	0	½	1	½	1	3½
(Soviet Union) Alexander Zaitsev	½	1	½	0	½	0	2½
