= Sergey Ivanov (chess player) =

Russian chess grandmaster (born 1961)

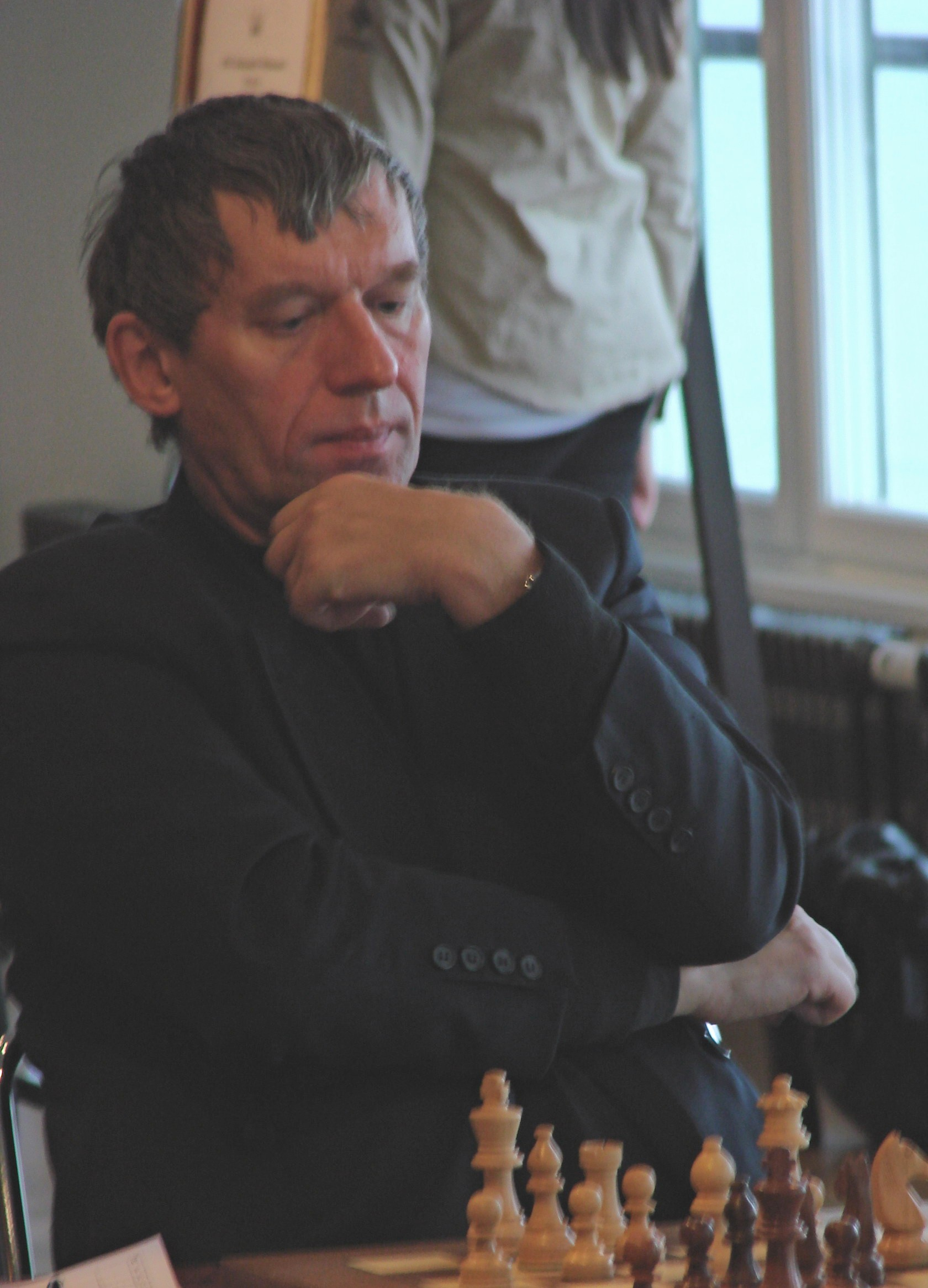

Personal information
- Born: September 29, 1961 (age 64) Leningrad, Soviet Union

Chess career
- Country: Soviet Union (until 1991); Russia (since 1991)
- Title: Grandmaster (1995)
- FIDE rating: 2474 (July 2026)
- Peak rating: 2574 (July 2000)

Sergey Vladimirovich Ivanov is a Russian chess grandmaster.

== Chess career ==
He won the Leningrad City Chess Championship in 1991, 1992, and 1994.

In August 2015, he tied for first place with Robert Zelcic and Mladen Palac at the Schwarzacher Open, ultimately placing in third after tiebreaks.

In April 2017, he played on the Russian 50+ team alongside Alexander Khalifman, Sergey Ionov, and Evgeniy Solozhenkin in the World Senior Team Championship.
