= Sergey Ionov =

Russian chess grandmaster (born 1962)

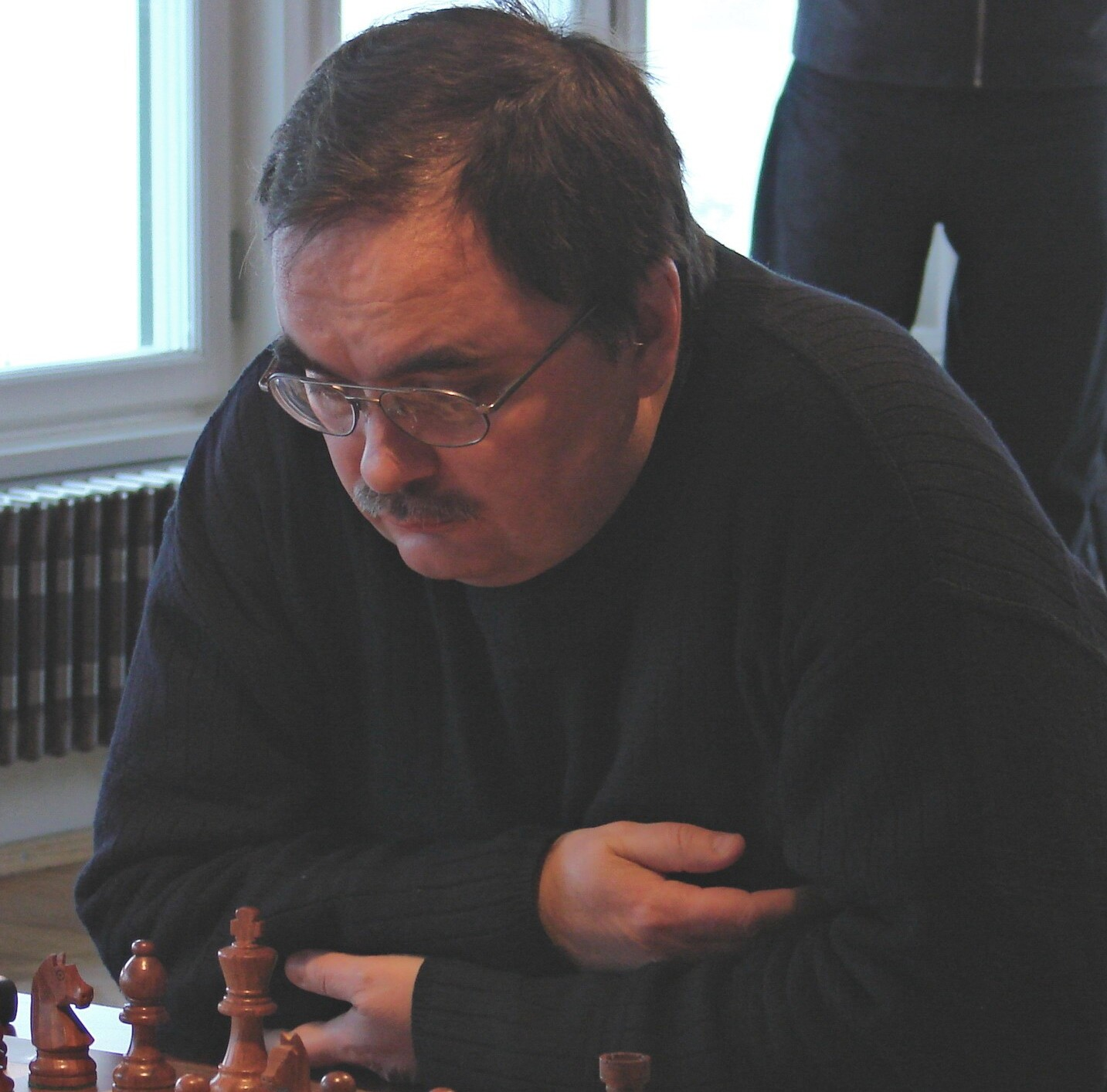
- Ionov in 2009

Personal information
- Born: January 7, 1962 (age 64) Veliky Novgorod, Russian SFSR, Soviet Union

Chess career
- Country: Soviet Union (until 1991); Russia (since 1991)
- Title: Grandmaster (1996)
- FIDE rating: 2502 (July 2026)
- Peak rating: 2559 (May 2011)

Sergey Dmitrievich Ionov is a Russian chess grandmaster.

== Chess career ==
In April 1998, he finished fourth in the St. Petersburg Championship, and was one of a few players to end the tournament with a plus score.

In January 1999, he played in Group B of the Hoogovens Wijk aan Zee Chess Tournament 1999. He went undefeated in the tournament and finished tied for third place. During the tournament, he defeated Friso Nijboer and held top seeds Smbat Lputian and Igor Glek to draws.

In April 2017, he played on the Russian 50+ team alongside Alexander Khalifman, Sergey Ivanov, and Evgeniy Solozhenkin in the World Senior Team Championship.

In October 2022, he won the Russian Senior Rapid Championship with a score of 8/10, finishing ahead of Yuri Balashov and Evgenij Kalegin.
