= Leningrad City Chess Championship =

Chess competition in Russia

The Leningrad City Chess Championship is a chess tournament held officially in the city of Leningrad, Russia starting from 1920. The city was called Petrograd from 1914 to 1924, then Leningrad until 1991, and Saint Petersburg afterwards. Only players born or living in or around the city were allowed to participate in this event.

The championship continued to be played, in spite of tremendous difficulties, also during the siege of Leningrad in the Second World War, though the tournament of 1941 could not be finished and that of 1942, the most difficult year of the blockade, could not be organized.

The winners include World champions Mikhail Botvinnik (1931 and 1932), Boris Spassky (1959 and 1961) and FIDE World Champion Alexander Khalifman (1996 and 1997).

== List of winners ==
#	Year	Winner
1	1920	Ilya Rabinovich
2	1922	Grigory Levenfish
3	1924	Grigory Levenfish
4	1925	Ilya Rabinovich; Peter Romanovsky; Alexander Ilyin-Genevsky; Grigory Levenfish
5	1926	Alexander Ilyin-Genevsky
6	1928	Ilya Rabinovich
7	1929	Alexander Ilyin-Genevsky
8	1931	Mikhail Botvinnik
9	1932	Mikhail Botvinnik
10	1933-4	Vladimir Alatortsev; Georgy Lisitsin
11	1936	Viacheslav Ragozin
12	1937	Dmitry Ossipovich Rovner; Alexander Tolush; Vitaly Chekhover
13	1938	Alexander Tolush
14	1939	Georgy Lisitsin
15	1940	Ilya Rabinovich
16	1941	unfinished
17	1943	Fedor Sklyarov
18	1944	Abram Model
19	1945	Viacheslav Ragozin
20	1946	Alexander Tolush
21	1947	Georgy Lisitsin; Alexander Tolush
22	1948	Mark Taimanov
23	1949	Vitaly Chekhover
24	1950	Mark Taimanov
25	1952	Mark Taimanov
26	1953	Semyon Furman
27	1954	Nikolai Georgiyevich Kopilov
28	1955	Viktor Korchnoi
29	1956	Pavel Yevseyevich Kondratiev
30	1957	Viktor Korchnoi; Semyon Furman
31	1958	Igor Georgyevich Rubel
32	1959	Boris Spassky
33	1960	Vladimir Vasilyevich Shishkin
34	1961	Boris Spassky; Mark Taimanov
35	1962	Konstatin Mikhailovich Klaman
36	1963	Boris Timofeyevich Vladimirov
37	1964	Viktor Korchnoi
38	1965	Vadim Zelmanovich Faibisovich
39	1966	Evgeny Ruban
40	1967	Alexander Cherepkov
41	1968	Alexander Cherepkov
42	1969	Vadim Zelmanovich Faibisovich
43	1970	Vladimir Ivanovich Karasev
44	1971	Viacheslav Osnos
45	1972	Andrey Lukin
46	1973	Mark Taimanov
47	1974	Vladimir Ivanovich Karasev
48	1975	Mark Tseitlin
49	1976	Mark Tseitlin
50	1977	Vadim Zelmanovich Faibisovich
51	1978	Mark Tseitlin; Andrey Lukin
52	1979	Igor Alexeyevich Polovodin
53	1980	Viacheslav Osnos
54	1981	Andrey Lukin
55	1982	Alexander Cherepkov
56	1983	Andrey Lukin
57	1984	Leonid Yudasin
58	1985	Alex Yermolinsky; Vladislav Vorotnikov
59	1986	Evgeniy Solozhenkin
60	1987	Vladimir Epishin
61	1988	Andrey Lukin
62	1989	Alexey Yuneev
63	1990	Konstantin Sakaev; A. Ivanov
64	1991	Sergey Ivanov
65	1992	Sergey Ivanov
66	1993	Vasily Yemelin
67	1994	Sergey Ivanov
68	1995	Peter Svidler
69	1996	Alexander Khalifman
70	1997	Alexander Khalifman
71	1998	Evgeniy Solozhenkin
72	1999	Evgeny Shaposhnikov
73	2000	Valery Loginov
74	2001	Valerij Popov
75	2002	Vasily Yemelin
76	2003	Denis Yevseev
77	2004	Valery Loginov
78	2005	Valery Loginov
79	2006	Valerij Popov
80	2007	Marat Makarov
81	2008	Alexey Goganov
82	2009	Maxim Matlakov
83	2010	Ildar Khairullin
84	2011	Vasily Yemelin
85	2012	Aleksandr Shimanov
86	2013	Denis Yevseev
87	2014	Denis Yevseev on tiebreak over Valerij Popov
88	2015	Alexey Zenzera
89	2016	Alexey Goganov
90	2017	Evgeny Alekseev
91	2018	Sergei Lobanov
92	2019	Evgeny A. Levin
