= Bykhovsky =

Bykhovsky, feminine: Bykhovskaya is a Russian toponymic surname associated with the placename Bykhov. Notable people with the surname include:

- Anatoly Bykhovsky (born 1988), Russia-born Israeli chess player
- Elisheva Bikhovski (1888–1949), Russian and Israeli poet, writer, literary critic and translator

== See also ==
- Bykhovsky Uyezd, subdivision in Russian Empire
