= Osnos =

Osnos is a surname. Notable people with the surname include:

- Evan Osnos (born 1976), American journalist and author
- Peter Osnos (born 1943), American journalist and publisher, father of Evan
- Vyacheslav Osnos (1935–2009), Russian chess player
