= Mircea-Sergiu Lupu =

French chess grandmaster (born 1962)

Personal information
- Born: August 28, 1962 (age 63) Negrești, Romania

Chess career
- Country: Romania (until 2015); France (since 2015)
- Title: Grandmaster (1995)
- Peak rating: 2520 (July 1998)

Mircea-Sergiu Lupu is a Romanian-French chess grandmaster.

== Chess career ==
In 1989, he played for Romania in the European Team Chess Championships, where he won the individual gold medal on board 6.

He played for Romania in the 1990 and 1994 Chess Olympiads.

In 1995, he won the Bethune Open. In 1999, he won the Montpellier Op-A tournament alongside Elmar Magerramov.
