= Konstantin Kudryavtsev =

Konstantin Kudryavtsev may refer to:

- Konstantin Borisovich Kudryavtsev, Russian FSB agent involved in the poisoning of Alexei Navalny, a Russian opposition leader
- Konstantin Kudryavtsev, former name of Konstantin Sokolsky, Latvian-Russian singer
