= Elizaveta Solozhenkina =

Russian chess player (born 2003)

Personal information
- Born: Elizaveta Evgenievna Solozhenkina; 10 September 2003 (age 23) Saint Petersburg, Russia

Chess career
- Country: Russia
- Title: Woman Grandmaster (2021)
- Peak rating: 2330 (April 2019)

Elizaveta Evgenievna Solozhenkina (Russian: Елизавета Евгеньевна Соложенкина; born 10 September 2003) is a Russian chess player. She received the FIDE title of Woman Grandmaster (WGM) in 2021.

== Biography ==
Elizaveta Solozhenkina is the daughter of GM Evgeniy Solozhenkin. She attended a Saint Petersburg chess school as a schoolgirl. She started playing chess from the age of five. In 2015, Elizaveta Solozhenkina won the Russian Youth Chess Championship in the U13 girls age group.

Solozhenkina repeatedly represented Russia at the European Youth Chess Championships and World Youth Chess Championships in different age groups, where she won five medals: gold (in 2015, at the European Youth Chess Championship in the U12 girls age group), three silver (in 2012 and 2013, at the European Youth Chess Championship in the U10 girls age group, and in 2014, at the World Youth Chess Championship in the U12 girls age group) and bronze (in 2017, at the World Youth Chess Championship in the U14 girls age group).

She was awarded the FIDE Woman International Master (WIM) title in 2016 and the FIDE Woman Grandmaster (WGM) title in 2021.
