= Alexander Zaitsev (chess player) =

Soviet chess grandmaster

Alexander Zaitsev in 1957

Alexander Nikolayevich Zaitsev (June 15, 1935 – October 31, 1971) was a Soviet chess grandmaster. He was born in Vladivostok, Russia and was also an electrical engineer.

== Chess career ==
Zaitsev shared first place at the 1968 USSR Chess Championship in Alma Ata. He eventually took the silver medal after losing the play-off to co-winner Lev Polugaevsky.

The website Chessmetrics lists his highest ELO rating as 2661 (January 1969) and his highest world ranking as 21 (achieved in April 1969 and May 1969).

== Death ==
Zaitsev died at the age of 36. The cause of his death was not announced.

== Legacy ==
His name is attached to the "Zaitsev Gambit" (1.d4 Nf6 2.c4 g6 3.Nc3 d5 4.h4) of the Grünfeld Defence.
