= Lev Aronson =

Latvian musician

- Genre: classical
- Instrument: cello

Lev Zacharovitch Aronson (Lew Aronson, Lev Aronoff, Lev Aronov, Lev Arnoff, Lew Arnow, Lew Arnoff-Aramon, Lew Arnoff-Aronson; February 7, 1912 – November 12, 1988) was an Eastern European-American cellist and cello teacher.

== Early life ==
Lev Aronson was born February 7, 1912, in Mönchengladbach, Germany. Aronson's parents, Zorach and Pessa, along with their first infant son, had moved to Germany in 1911 so Zorach could study tailoring at the Fachhochschule (School of Fashion) in Berlin. Zorach and Pessa's infant son died in 1911. Lev was born a few weeks before his father graduated from the Fachhochschule. About three weeks after Lev's birth, the family returned to their home in Mitava in the Courland region of the Russian Empire (presently Jelgava, Latvia).

Aronson's sister, Gerda, was born in 1914, the same year Archduke Franz Ferdinand was assassinated and World War I began. The Russian government, fearing that German and Yiddish-speaking Jews might be or become German spies, took action quickly. On April 18, 1915, the Decree of Expulsion was issued by Czarist Russia, and many Jews were forcibly moved to the interior of Russia. The Aronsons and many other Jews were deported on cattle cars to Voronezh, southeast of Moscow.

Aronson first heard the cello played by a child of a non-Jewish neighbor in Voronezh. Soon after this, a relative on his mother's side, Nikolai Arnoff, who was a professional cellist, came to Voronezh to give a concert and stayed with the Aronson family. He taught Lev how to hold the instrument and the bow. Lev's father bought him a small cello and arranged with a fellow immigrant, Aron Rafaelovitsch Rubinstein, to teach the child his first cello lessons. Lev was seven.

In 1920, the family was allowed to leave Voronezh, and they chose to move to Riga, Latvia. Lev attended school in Riga and continued to study cello. As a youth, he performed occasionally with the orchestra at silent movies. Aronson studied cello with Paul Berkowitz, a well-known physician and cellist in Riga.

== Between the World Wars ==
Upon his graduation from high school at 16, Aronson moved to Berlin to study law. During his first semester he met a doctor who was an amateur cellist. The doctor, after hearing Aronson play, introduced him to Julius Klengel in Leipzig. Aronson began studying cello with Klengel and soon gave up law to focus on music. After a year with Klengel, Lev began his studies with Alfred von Glehn at the Klindworth-Scharwenka Conservatory in Berlin. When von Glehn died, Gregor Piatigorsky took over his class. Piatigorsky was to become Aronson's life-long mentor and friend. Aronson began performing locally with three German friends in the Peters String Quartet in 1931.

In 1933, Adolf Hitler became chancellor of Germany. Anti-Jewish violence in Germany and throughout Europe was on the rise. Aronson decided to change his name to Lev Arnoff, which sounded more Russian than Jewish in an attempt to escape attention and continue performing. Aronson found a patroness, Mrs. Daliba Jones, whom he met in Florence through American conductor Vladimir Shavitch, and began to build a successful performing career throughout Europe as a soloist. He won a competition in Russia. He made several recordings for the Bellacord Electro label. In 1937, he became principal cellist for the Philharmonic Orchestra of Libau. During the late 1930s, Aronson also began teaching cello in Riga, awakening a passion for education that would stay with him for the rest of his life.

== The Holocaust and its aftermath ==
German forces invaded and occupied Riga in June 1941. Aronson's cellos were confiscated. Aronson began work as a slave laborer for the Gestapo. The Jews were moved to a ghetto in the so-called Moscow suburb of Riga. Between November 29 and December 8, 1941, thousands of Jews living in the Riga Ghetto were taken to the Rumbula forest, shot, and buried in mass graves. Among them were Aronson's parents.

Aronson worked at the clothing depot, Ausekla, for much of the period between the German invasion and 1943. In 1943, the Riga-Kaiserwald concentration camp system was formally established. Many Jews already lived and worked at satellite work camps in the region, which were now considered to be part of the Kaiserwald system. The Riga Ghetto was liquidated, moving the Jews from one horrible situation to another. Most Jews from the ghetto or satellite camps passed through Kaiserwald briefly on their way to work assignments within the system. Aronson worked at the Lenta subcamp, and outgrowth of Ausekla.

In the fall of 1944, the Germans fled Latvia ahead of the Russian advance. Aronson and a number of other Jews from Kaiserwald and its subcamps, including his sister, were deported to the Stutthof concentration camp. Aronson's sister died at Stutthof.

From Stutthof, Aronson was transferred to Burggraben and worked in the Danzig shipyards. In 1945, the Germans again moved their Jewish prisoners ahead of the Allied advance. Aronson was in one of the many groups of Jews sent on death marches in the early months of 1945. His group made it to Gotentov (near Lauenberg), where they were liberated on March 10, 1945, by the Russians.

Aronson, along with many other survivors, was sent to a Soviet repatriation camp in Torun, Poland. Aronson managed to escape and made his way with the help of the Jewish underground through Poland and Germany to the American militarized zone, where he spent nearly two years waiting to be allowed to immigrate to the United States. During his flight, Aronson met dancer Nina Bukowska, and the two fell in love and were married in 1947.

Some of the musicians from the Riga ghetto survived the war in the same camps as Aronson; the tenor Gregor Shelkan was one of them. After the war, Aronson and Shelkan, memorializing those who died in the war, composed several original pieces. A few of these compositions were published in the displaced persons camp Schlachtensee in the American zone of Berlin. On February 17, 1954, the fellow survivors met again, but this time on TV, when Aronson appeared on NBC's This Is Your Life to surprise Gregor Shelkan who was being honored on the show.

== United States ==
Aronson and Bukowska immigrated to the United States in 1948. He accepted a contract with the Dallas Symphony Orchestra and moved to Texas. Aronson served as assistant principal cellist in the Dallas Symphony for the 1948–1949 season and then as principal until 1967. Aronson taught cello at Baylor University in Waco, Texas, from 1967 until 1980. In 1980, Aronson began teaching at Southern Methodist University. In the 1970s, Aronson collaborated with Croatian cellist and composer Rudolf Matz, producing the two-volume work The Complete Cellist.

Bukowska and Aronson moved to Dallas together but later divorced. Aronson married Deane Wright in 1959 and was subsequently divorced. He married Harriet Snodgrass, a fellow cellist and former pupil, in 1979.

Lev Aronson died in Dallas on November 12, 1988. In 1990, he was posthumously awarded the Chevalier du violoncello by the Janzer Foundation.

== Impact as a cello teacher ==
Though a talented performer, Lev Aronson is perhaps best-known as an influential teacher of the cello. During his tenure in the Dallas Symphony, he taught several private cello students. After his retirement from the orchestra, he dedicated more time to teaching, privately and at his university appointments. He founded and conducted the Dal-Hi Chamber Players, a group of young musicians who performed in the United States and abroad in the 1970s. He taught and judged at numerous music festivals, workshops, and competitions. He also taught a course for the Southern Methodist University Continuing Education program, which introduced adults to western art music.

Aronson's students include Lynn Harrell and Ralph Kirshbaum. and Richard Popeand John Sharp.
