= Abram Model =

Soviet chess player (1896–1976)

Abram Yakovlevich Model (Russian: Абрам Яковлевич Моде́ль; 23 October 1896, Daugavpils – 16 February 1976, Leningrad) was a Soviet chess master, although he had his master title taken away by the Soviet chess authorities due to lack of results.

Abram Yakovlevich Model was born in Daugavpils, Latvia. Then he lived in St. Petersburg (Petrograd, Leningrad). During World War II, he won the 18th Championship of Leningrad in 1944. He shared third place in the 1927 USSR Chess Championship.

He was an early coach of Mikhail Botvinnik. His greatest achievement was probably in 1929. He anonymously challenged Leningrad's top players, including Ilyin-Genevsky, Botvinnik, Ragozin, Rokhlin and Leonid Kubbel, to a telephone simultaneous exhibition as "Master X", quickly gaining the upper hand in most games, and scoring seven wins and three draws.
