= 1961 USSR Chess Championship (29th) =

Soviet chess tournament

29th Soviet Chess Championship
- Location: Baku

Champion
- Boris Spassky

The 1961 Soviet Chess Championship - 29th edition was held from 16 November to 20 December 1961 in Baku. The tournament was won by Boris Spassky. The final were preceded by semifinals events at Batumi, Novgorod and Kiev. 1961 was the year of two Soviet Chess Championships, the 28th and the 29th editions.

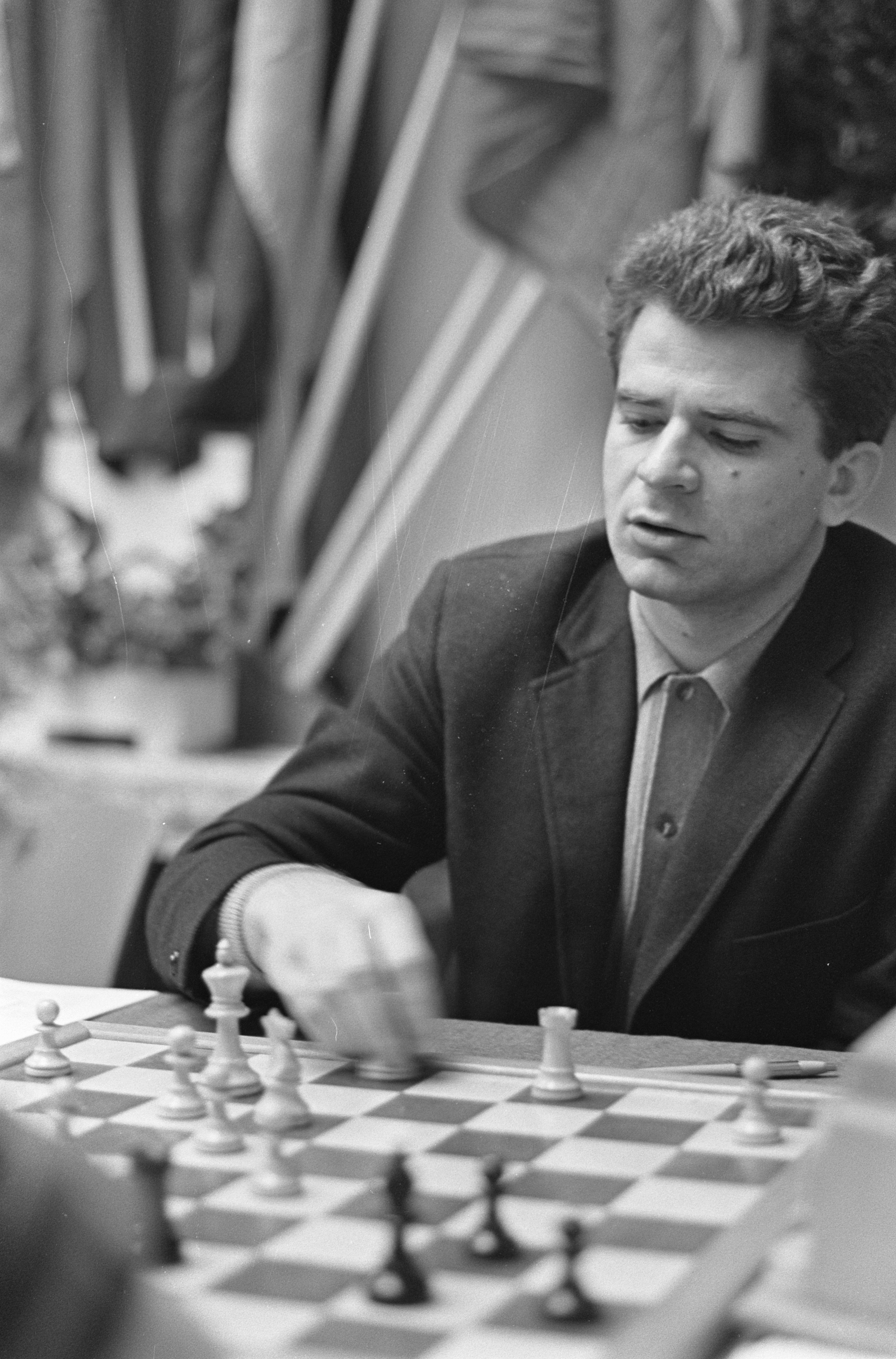
Boris Spassky

== Table and results ==
29th Soviet Chess Championship
	Player	1	2	3	4	5	6	7	8	9	10	11	12	13	14	15	16	17	18	19	20	21	Total
1	(Soviet Union) Boris Spassky	-	1	½	1	½	½	½	1	½	½	1	0	½	1	1	1	½	1	½	1	1	14½
2	(Soviet Union) Lev Polugaevsky	0	-	½	½	1	½	1	0	½	½	½	1	1	½	1	1	½	1	1	1	1	14
3	(Soviet Union) David Bronstein	½	½	-	1	0	1	½	½	½	½	1	½	½	1	½	½	½	1	½	1	½	12½
4	(Soviet Union) Mikhail Tal	0	½	0	-	½	1	½	½	½	½	½	1	1	½	1	1	½	1	0	½	1	12
5	(Soviet Union) Evgeni Vasiukov	½	0	1	½	-	½	0	½	1	0	½	½	½	1	½	1	1	½	1	½	1	12
6	(Soviet Union) Mark Taimanov	½	½	0	0	½	-	½	1	½	1	½	1	1	0	½	1	½	0	1	½	1	11½
7	(Soviet Union) Yuri Averbakh	½	0	½	½	1	½	-	½	½	½	0	½	0	½	1	1	1	1	1	1	0	11½
8	(Soviet Union) Vassily Smyslov	0	1	½	½	½	0	½	-	½	1	0	1	½	½	½	0	1	1	1	½	½	11
9	(Soviet Union) Paul Keres	½	½	½	½	0	½	½	½	-	½	½	½	0	1	1	1	½	1	½	½	½	11
10	(Soviet Union) Ratmir Kholmov	½	½	½	½	1	0	½	0	½	-	½	0	1	0	0	1	1	½	1	1	1	11
11	(Soviet Union) Aivars Gipslis	0	½	0	½	½	½	1	1	½	½	-	0	½	½	½	½	1	1	½	½	1	11
12	(Soviet Union) Leonid Shamkovich	1	0	½	0	½	0	½	0	½	1	1	-	0	1	½	1	½	½	0	1	1	10½
13	(Soviet Union) Abram Khasin	½	0	½	0	½	0	1	½	1	0	½	1	-	1	½	0	½	0	½	½	1	9½
14	(Soviet Union) Yury Kots	0	½	0	½	0	1	½	½	0	1	½	0	0	-	1	½	0	0	0	1	1	8
15	(Soviet Union) Vladislav Shianovsky	0	0	½	0	½	½	0	½	0	1	½	½	½	0	-	½	½	½	1	1	0	8
16	(Soviet Union) Boris Vladimirov	0	0	½	0	0	0	0	1	0	0	½	0	1	½	½	-	1	1	1	0	1	8
17	(Soviet Union) Anatoly Lein	½	½	½	½	0	½	0	0	½	0	0	½	½	1	½	0	-	0	1	½	½	7½
18	(Soviet Union) Vladimir Savon	0	0	0	0	½	1	0	0	0	½	0	½	1	1	½	0	1	-	½	½	½	7½
19	(Soviet Union) Rashid Nezhmetdinov	½	0	½	1	0	0	0	0	½	0	½	1	½	1	0	0	0	½	-	1	0	7
20	(Soviet Union) Vladimir Bagirov	0	0	0	½	½	½	0	½	½	0	½	0	½	0	0	1	½	½	0	-	½	6
21	(Soviet Union) Bukhuti Gurgenidze	0	0	½	0	0	0	1	½	½	0	0	0	0	0	1	0	½	½	1	½	-	6
