= Konstantin Sokolsky =

Latvian singer (1904–1991

Konstantin Sokolsky (also spelled: Sokolski, Russian: Константин Сокольский, original name Konstantin Kudryavtsev (Константин Кудрявцев)) (7 December 1904 – 12 May 1991) was a Latvian singer. Sokolsky was born in Saint-Petersburg, Russian Empire, but for most of his life lived in Riga, Latvia (his father came from Ludzas County, which is where the family moved to after the revolutionary turmoil of 1917 began in Saint-Petersburg).

There he worked as a woodcutter and loader, until in 1928 at Riga's 'Mars' cinema he first appeared on stage as a singer. Initially, he tried to imitate Alexander Vertinsky (for example, he too sang in a Pierrot costume), but later found his own style. He got acquainted with popular composer Oscar Strok, author of tango music, and became the first to sing all his new songs. In the same time, he himself wrote lyrics and music for several songs.

In the 1930-1940s, first with the Riga Bonzo Theatre and later individually, he went on tours of Romania, Czechoslovakia and Yugoslavia, where he became very popular among different audiences, including many Russian émigrés. Sokolsky's stage image was refined, but could still be interpreted as acting the 'Russian bear', with a sense of self-parody. Very tall, joyous, with self-respect — he reminded many Russian émigrés of their Mother Russia, which they had had to leave, sooner or later after the Bolshevik revolution.

In Russia, his songs also became popular, released on L.P.'s with the Bonophon and Bellaccord labels.

During World War II, he stayed in Latvia. In 1944 he was arrested by the Germans, but escaped.
