= Ildar Khairullin =

Russian chess grandmaster (born 1990)

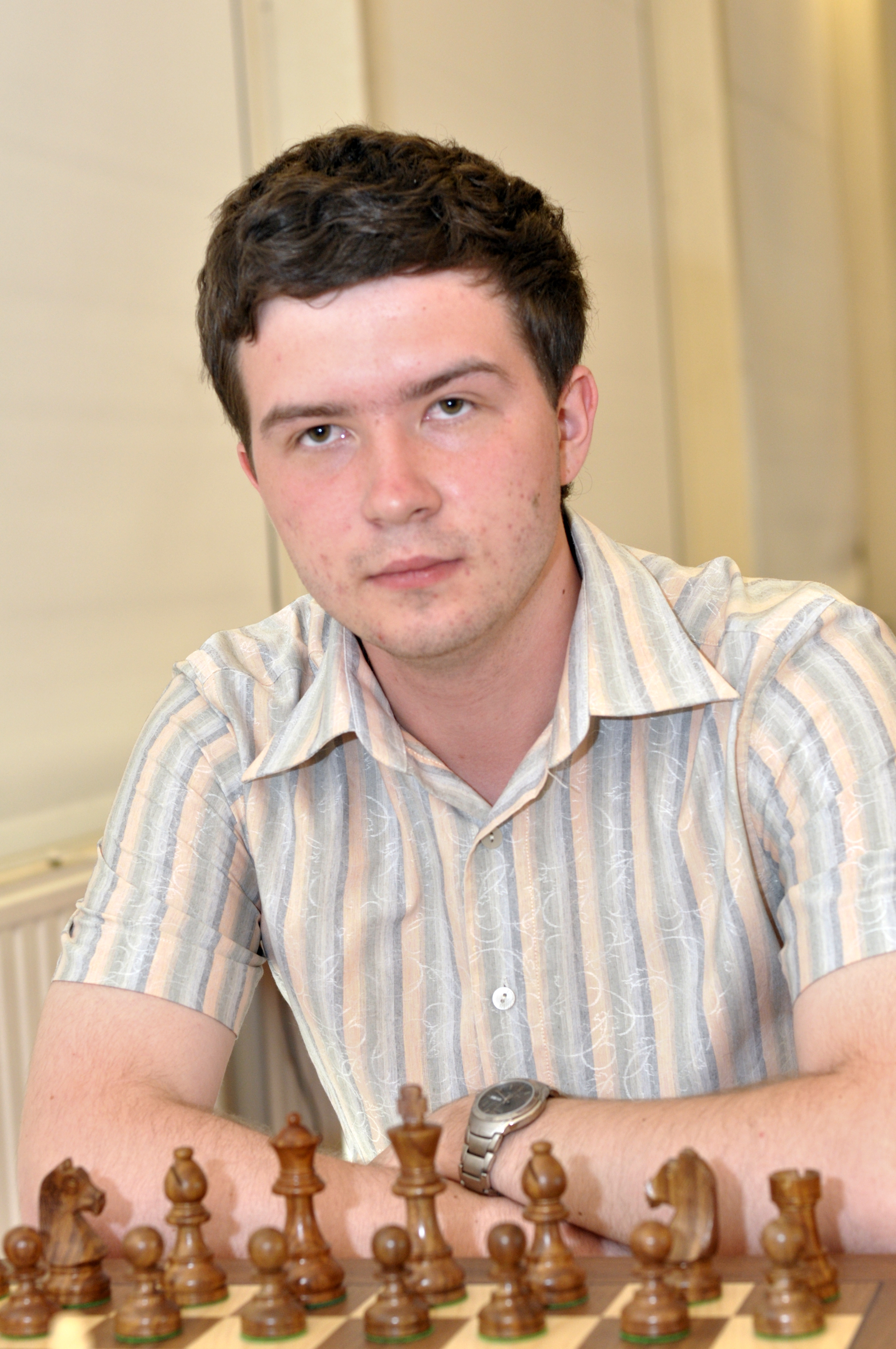
- Ildar Khairullin, 2009

Personal information
- Born: August 22, 1990 (age 35) Perm, Russia

Chess career
- Country: Russia
- Title: Grandmaster (2007)
- FIDE rating: 2615 (July 2026)
- Peak rating: 2662 (August 2015)
- Peak ranking: No. 77 (August 2015)

Ildar Khairullin (born 22 August 1990) is a Russian chess grandmaster. He learned to play chess when 6 years old. His first coach was Valeriy Pugachevsky. At eight years old, he became a Candidate Master and at 14 an International Master. After school, he began studying at the Saratov State Social-Economic University, but later transferred to the State University of Economics and Finance in Saint Petersburg.

Together with 43 other Russian chess players, Khairullin signed an open letter to Russian president Vladimir Putin, protesting against the Russian invasion of Ukraine and expressing solidarity with the Ukrainian people.

== Chess career ==
He has won the Russian Junior Championships at U-10 (Serpukhov, 2000), U-12 (Dagomys, 2002) and U-14 (Dagomys, 2003). In 2004 Khairullin won the U-14 World Youth Championship in Heraklion, going on to win the U-18 section in Belfort, France in 2005. That year, he finished second to Sergey Karjakin in the "Young Stars of the World" tournament held in Kirishi, Russia, narrowly missing a GM norm.

In 2003 and 2009 he won Volga Federal District Championship. In 2006 he shared 5th place at the Russian Chess Championship with Sergei Rublevsky and Evgeny Tomashevsky. He also won the 2010 St. Petersburg City Championship.

In 2007 he was awarded the FIDE Grandmaster title. At the International level Khairullin shared 11th–21st place at the Moscow Open 2008, 3rd–7th Place at the Hogeschool Zeeland Open in 2009 and 2nd–4th place at the Capablanca Memorial Tournament (Premier) in Havana in 2010.

In the 2011 European Individual Chess Championships (which provided 23 qualifiers for the Chess World Cup 2011), Khairullin finished in 17th place. He was knocked out in the first round of the Chess World Cup 2011 by Ni Hua 3.5-2.5 after rapid tiebreaks.

In 2012, he tied for 1st–8th with Vadim Zvjaginsev, Alexander Areshchenko, Valerij Popov, Boris Kharchenko, Evgeny Romanov, Maxim Matlakov and Ernesto Inarkiev in the Botvinnik Memorial in St. Petersburg.

In 2013, he tied for 1st–11h with Pavel Eljanov, Dmitry Kokarev, Vadim Zvjaginsev, Alexander Areshchenko, Maxim Matlakov, Denis Khismatullin, Oleg Korneev, Dragan Solak, Sanan Sjugirov and Ivan Bukavshin in the Chigorin Memorial in St. Petersburg.

Khairullin shared 5th-20th place in the Moscow Open in 2014 with 6.5/9 and shared 12th–21st in the Russian Championship (Higher League) with 5/9.

Khairullin has played for a number of clubs, namely Russia's Economist SGSEU-1 (Saratov), Chigorin Chess Club and FINEC (both from St. Petersburg) and SV Wiesbaden in Germany. With the Saint Petersberg Chess Federation team, he won the European Club Cup 2011 in Rogaska Slatina, scoring 4.5/6.
