= Oleh Nikolenko =

Ukrainian diplomat (born 1986)

- Олег Ніколенко
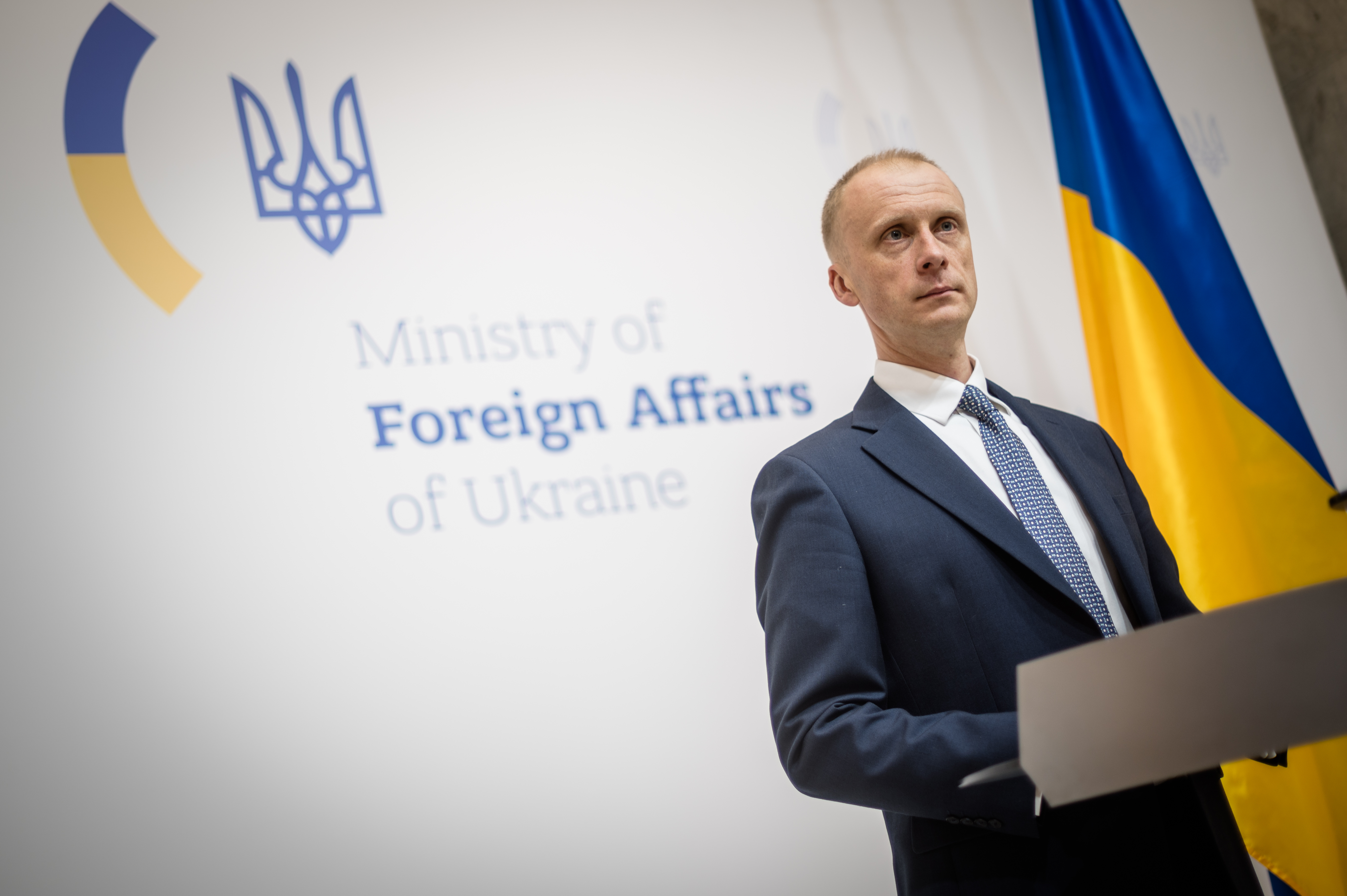

Consul General of Ukraine
- Incumbent
- Assumed office 14 March 2024
- President: Volodymyr Zelenskyy
- Preceded by: Oleksandr Shevchenko

Personal details
- Born: 19 August 1986 (age 40) Kherson, Ukraine
- Education: Kyiv University
- Occupation: Diplomat
- Profession: Consul General

Oleh Ihorovych Nikolenko (Ukrainian: Олег Ігорович Ніколенко; born 19 August 1986) is a Ukrainian diplomat. He was the spokesman of the Ministry of Foreign Affairs (2020-2024). On March 11, 2024, he was appointed Consul General of Ukraine in Toronto.

== Biography ==
Oleh Nikolenko was born in Kherson in a family of farmers.

In 2008, he graduated from the Institute of Philology at Taras Shevchenko National University of Kyiv with a master's degree in English and Arabic translation with honors.

In 2011, he graduated from the Institute of International Relations of Taras Shevchenko National University of Kyiv and became an international lawyer.

== Professional activity ==
In 2008, Oleh Nikolenko passed a competition for the position of attaché at the Ukrainian Embassy in Libya, where he worked in extreme conditions and was involved in the evacuation of Ukrainian citizens since 2011, when the civil war began in Libya.

After returning from Libya, he worked at the Ministry of Foreign Affairs of Ukraine in charge of the North Africa and Middle East region, and was an assistant to the Special Representative of Ukraine for the Middle East and Africa.

In 2015-2020, he was the spokesperson for the Permanent Mission of Ukraine to the United Nations in New York.

In 2016-2017, he served as a member of the Ukrainian delegation to the UN Security Council during Ukraine's non-permanent membership, where he dealt with North and West Africa, the settlement of the Western Sahara issue, and was the coordinator of the UN Security Council Sanctions Committee on Sudan 1591 (2005).

In 2019-2020, he acted as the Vice-Chairman of the UN Committee on Information[4], participated in the reform of the UN information policy in the context of countering the COVID-19 pandemic.

Since 22 November 2020, he has been the spokesperson of the Ministry of Foreign Affairs of Ukraine.

On March 11, 2024, he was appointed Consul General of Ukraine in Toronto.
