= Igor Naumkin =

Russian chess Grandmaster (1965–2022)

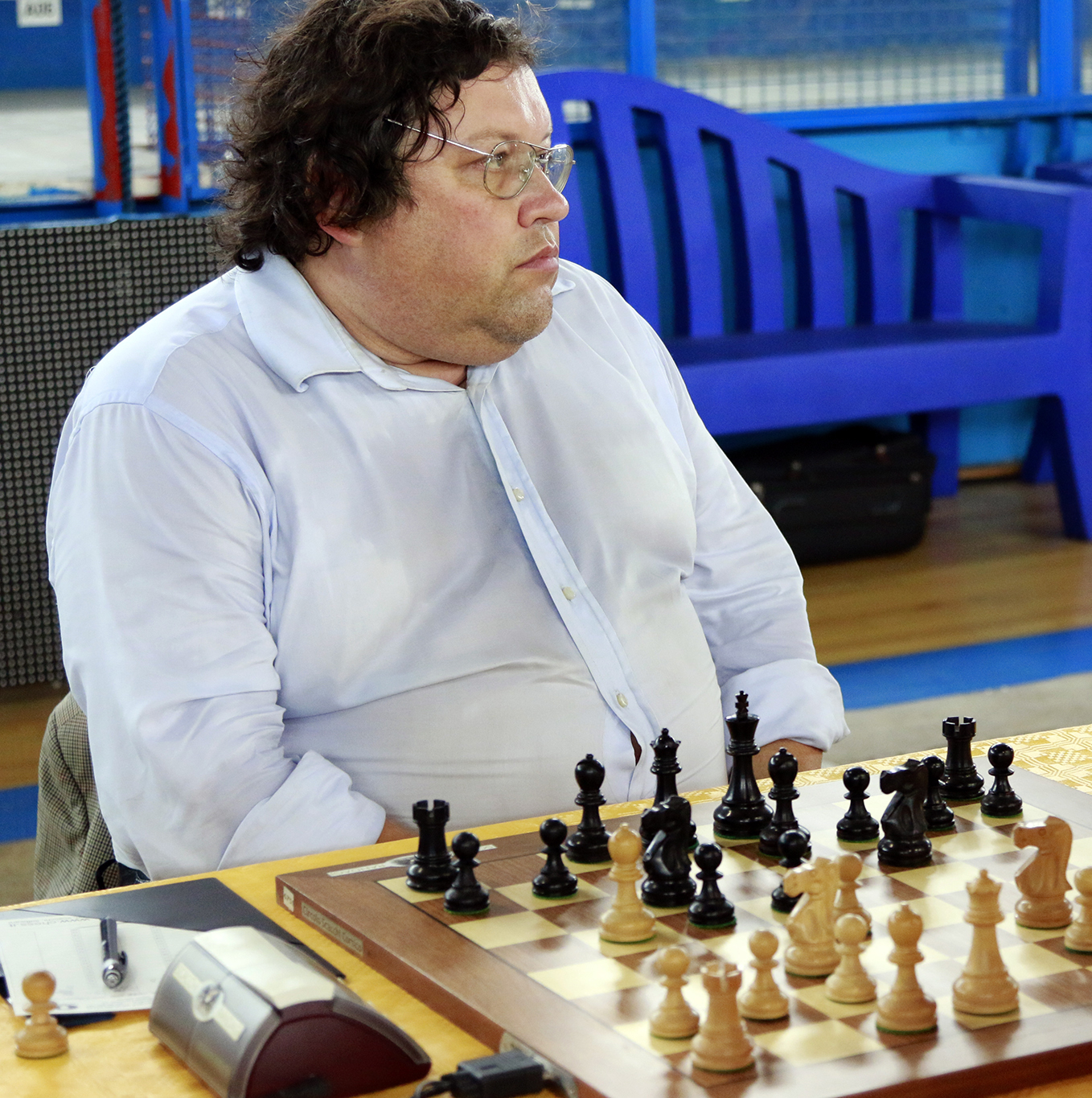
- Naumkin in Porto San Giorgio, Italy, in 2014

Personal information
- Born: 10 August 1965 Saratov, Russian SFSR, USSR
- Died: 13 July 2022 (aged 56) Asti, Italy

Chess career
- Country: Russia
- Title: Grandmaster (1990)
- Peak rating: 2510 (January 2007)

Igor Naumkin (10 August 1965 – 13 July 2022) was a Russian chess Grandmaster.

== Career ==
He earned his International Master title in 1988 and his Grandmaster title in 1990. Notable victories included over ex-world champion Mikhail Tal, and David Bronstein.

After the collapse of the Soviet Union, he left for Europe to find better chess opportunities, eventually settling in Italy and becoming fluent in the language. Naumkin traveled in Europe from tournament to tournament and was known for being a highly active player. In 2019, he was the #1 most active grandmaster with 258 games in 41 tournaments.

== Suspension ==
Naumkin was suspended for six months in 2017 for trying to manipulate a game by offering an opponent a victory in exchange for 200 euros. His opponent refused, and after an investigation Naumkin, along with two other players, were suspended.

== Death ==
He died in Asti, Italy on 13 July 2022. On 3 July he had won a weekend tournament in Pegli, finishing on 4½/5 points. He had remained in the area in order to go to the Russian consulate about his lost passport.
