= Andrey Lukin =

Russian chess player (born 1948)

Personal information
- Born: August 28, 1948 (age 77) Leningrad, Soviet Union

Chess career
- Country: Soviet Union; Russia
- Title: International Master (1982)
- FIDE rating: 2407 (July 2026)
- Peak rating: 2485 (January 1983)

Andrei Lukin (Russian: Андрей Лукин, born August 28, 1948) is a chess International Master and a chess coach.

== Chess career ==
He was one of the strongest junior chess players in the Soviet Union in the late 60s, qualified for the World Juniors in 1967 ahead of Karpov, Balashov and other very strong players, and was subsequently denied his shot at the title by the fact that the event was held in Israel, which at the time was a no-fly zone for Soviet sportsmen.

Since then his career failed to live up to the earlier promise, but he still became an International Master and won five Leningrad (Saint Petersburg) championships, which at the time were equal in strength to a national championship of an average European country, with many titled players taking part. Unlike majority of the other players of his level, he managed to combine his chess playing with a nine-to-five job as an engineer.

Andrei went into coaching in the late 1980s and since then helped many young chess players in Saint Petersburg, leading Konstantin Sakaev to a World Junior title. In 1993 he started to work with Peter Svidler, who credits him as the biggest influence in his career.
