= Abram Khasin =

Russian chess player (1923–2022)

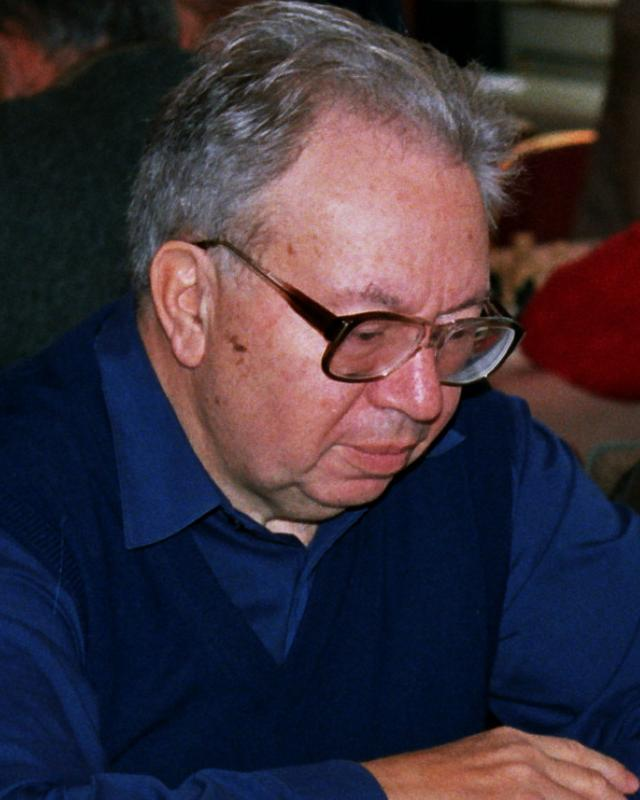
- Khasin in 1995

Personal information
- Full name: Abram Iosifovich Khasin
- Born: 15 February 1923 Zaporizhia, Ukrainian SSR, USSR
- Died: 6 February 2022 (aged 98) Essen, Germany

Chess career
- Country: Soviet Union → Russia
- Title: USSR Master of Sports (1950) International Master (1964) Correspondence Grandmaster (1972)
- Peak rating: 2480 (July 1971)

Abram Iosifovich Khasin (Russian: Абрам Иосифович Хасин; 15 February 1923 – 6 February 2022) was a Russian chess international master and correspondence grandmaster.

== Biography ==
Khasin was born in Zaporizhia, and grew up in Ukraine during the 1930s. During World War II, he became a soldier in the Red Army and had both legs amputated after being wounded in the Battle of Stalingrad. After World War II he worked as an English teacher and chess coach.

Among his students are grandmasters, coaches, journalists, commentators: Boris Gulko, Evgeny Bareev, Leonid Yurtaev, Yacov Murey, Natalia Konopleva, Elena Fatalibekova, Tamara Minogina, Aleksandr Kalinin.

From 2002 until his death, he lived in Essen, Germany with his family. His daughter, Anna Dergacheva, is also an international chess master.

He died in Essen on 6 February 2022, at the age of 98.

== Chess career ==
- Winner of the semi-final of the 1956 USSR Championship, ahead of Averbakh, Simagin, Polugayevsky and Ragozin, 17th place in the final held in Leningrad.
- 1st-5th in the semi-final of the 1957 USSR Championship in Leningrad; he scored 7.5 points out of 21 in the final in Moscow (22nd place).
- He also qualified for the final of the 1961 USSR Championship (13th, 8/17) and 1965 USSR Championship (13h, 8.5/17).
- Moscow Championship: 2nd (1963); 3rd (1955), (1957), (1958) and (1961).
- Third tied in the 1963-1964 Hastings tournament won by Mikhaïl Tal ahead of Gligoric;
- Tied for fourth in the Kislovodsk tournament in 1964 (victory for Tal ahead of Stein and Averbakh);
- 1st-4th in the Moscow international tournament in 1967;
- Tied for third in the Belgrade tournament in 1968;
- Tied for fifth in the Kislovodsk tournament in 1968, won by Geller8;
- Fourth in the RSFSR (Russia) championship in 1987;
- Sixth at the 1993 Senior World Championship;
- Fourth at the 1995 Senior World Championship.
- Khasin represented the USSR at the International Correspondence Chess Olympics from 1968 to 1987. The USSR won the competition at the 6th, 7th and 8th Correspondence Olympics (1968-1972, 1972-1976 and 1976–1982).
- He finished fourth in the 1975-1980 World Correspondence Championship and sixth in the 1983-1989 World Correspondence Championship.
