= Artashes Minasian =

Armenian chess grandmaster (born 1967)

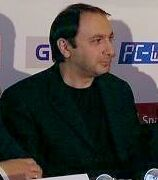
- Minasian at the 2008 Chess Olympiad

Personal information
- Born: 21 January 1967 (age 59) Armenian Soviet Socialist Republic, Soviet Union

Chess career
- Country: Soviet Union → Armenia
- Title: Grandmaster (1992)
- FIDE rating: 2460 (September 2026)
- Peak rating: 2620 (July 1998)
- Peak ranking: No. 52 (July 1998)

Artashes Minasian (also transliterated as Minasyan; Armenian: Արտաշես Մինասյան; born 21 January 1967) is an Armenian chess grandmaster. He tied for first in the 1991 USSR Chess Championship and is a six-time Armenian Chess Champion.

== Chess career ==
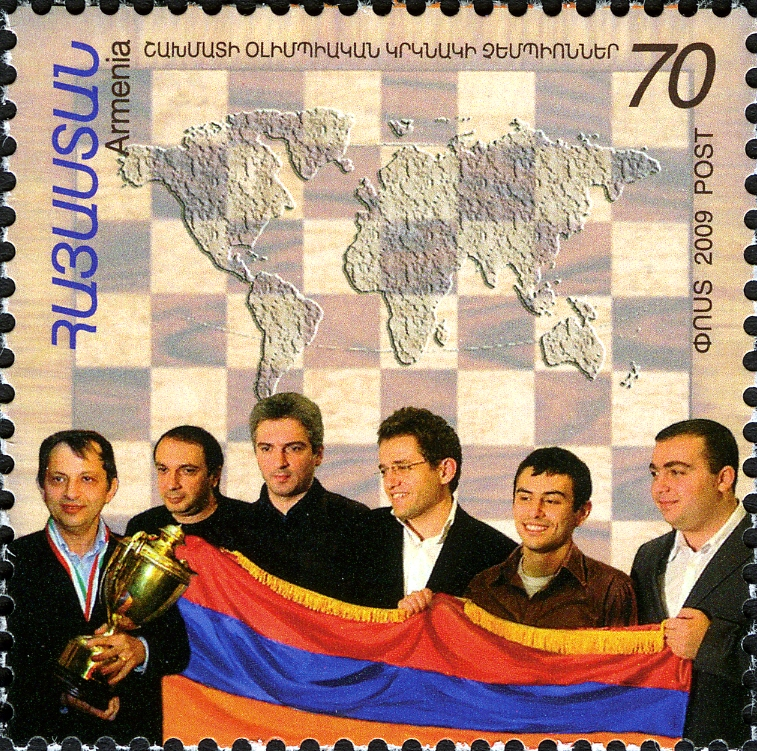
Minasian (2nd left) with his 2008 Olympiad teammates on a 2009 stamp of Armenia

He participated in eight Chess Olympiads with a record of +23 −12 =28. In 2006 the Armenian team took the first place at the 37th Chess Olympiad. Along with himself, the team consisted of Levon Aronian, Vladimir Akopian, Karen Asrian, Smbat Lputian, Gabriel Sargissian). Minasian won the Armenian Chess Championship six times, in 1990, 1992, 1993, 1995, 2004 and 2006. He also won the final USSR Chess Championship in 1991 and New York open championship in 1998.

He achieved a peak rating of 2620 in July 1998.

In December 2009, he was awarded the title of Honoured Master of Sport of the Republic of Armenia.

== Notable chess games ==
- Kateryna Lahno vs Artashes Minasian, 6th Aeroflot Festival 2007, Caro-Kann Defense: Classical Variation (B18), 0-1
- Artashes Minasian vs Tigran Nalbandian, Armenian Championship 2008, Nimzo-Larsen Attack: Modern Variation (A01), 1–0
- Artashes Minasian vs Loek Van Wely, Philadelphia 1994, Pirc Defense: Byrne Variation (B07), 1-0
