= Marat Askarov =

Chess grandmaster

Personal information
- Born: June 29, 1987 (age 39) Kazan, Russia

Chess career
- Country: Russia
- Title: Grandmaster (2008)
- FIDE rating: 2467 (July 2026)
- Peak rating: 2561 (April 2007)

Marat Askarov is a Russian chess grandmaster. He was awarded the titles of International Master in 2005 and Grandmaster in 2008.
