= Egor Chukaev =

Lithuanian chess player (1917–1978)

Personal information
- Born: 6 May 1917
- Died: 1978
- Spouse: Klavdiya Chukaeva

Chess career
- Country: Soviet Union

Egor Chukaev (Russian: Егор Сергеевич Чукаев; Lithuanian: Jegoras Čiukajevas; 6 May 1917 – 1978) was a Lithuanian chess player who won Lithuanian Chess Championship (1971).

== Biography ==
Chukaev emigrated to Lithuania after World War II. He lived in Kaunas.

Chukaev was awarded the Master of Sports of the USSR in Chess (1961). He won the Lithuanian Chess Championship in 1971 and also shared 1st—2nd place three times: in 1953 and 1955 (with Ratmir Kholmov), and 1973 (with Algimantas Butnorius). Also he was silver medalist of the Lithuanian Chess Championship: 1948, 1952, 1956, 1958, and 1974, and bronze medalist in 1954, 1963.

Chukaev was a multiple participant in the USSR Team Chess Championships (1955, 1958) and the Spartakiad of the Peoples of the USSR Team Chess Tournaments (1959, 1963, 1975).

His wife, Klavdiya Chukaeva (1925 — ?), was also a chess player who won the Lithuanian Women's Chess Championships four times.
