= Elmar Magerramov =

Azerbaijani chess grandmaster (born 1958)

Personal information
- Born: April 10, 1958 (age 68) Baku, Azerbaijan SSR, Soviet Union

Chess career
- Country: Azerbaijan
- Title: Grandmaster (1992)
- FIDE rating: 2515 (July 2026)
- Peak rating: 2580 (July 1994)
- Peak ranking: No. 76 (July 1991)

Elmar Magerramov (Azerbaijani: Elmar Məhərrəmov; Russian: Эльмар Магеррамов; born April 10, 1958, in Baku, Azerbaijan SSR, Soviet Union) is an Azerbaijani chess grandmaster.

== Career ==
In 1991, he shared first place in the last USSR Chess Championship, with Artashes Minasian, losing the title on tiebreaks. In 1992, Magerramov became the first chess Grandmaster in the history of Azerbaijan.

He has played with Kasparov several training matches and tournament games, with an overall score of + 4–8 = 7.

Along with his playing career, Elmar had an extensive coaching career as well. He has been National Team Coach of Tunis, coached Garry Kasparov during 1984 World Chess Championship and Maia Chiburdanidze during 1991 Women's Chess World Championship.

Magerramov is currently living in UAE. He is married and has two sons. His main hobbies apart from chess are mathematics and music. He plays on the Internet Chess Club (ICC) under the pseudonym "El-Marmalade".

The ninth chapter of Tibor Karolyi's 2009 book Genius in the Background is devoted to him.
