= Jakob Meister =

Russian-German chess grandmaster (born 1955)

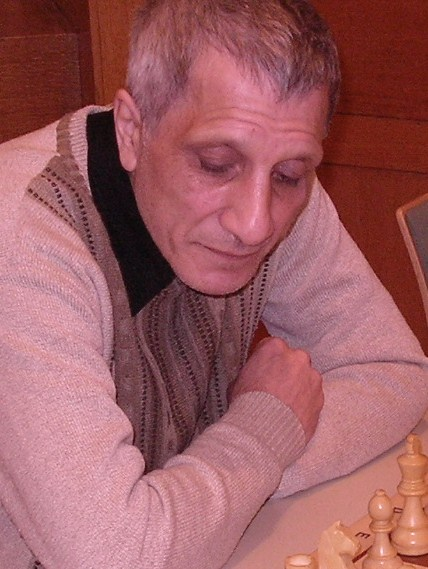

Personal information
- Born: September 11, 1955 (age 71) Kopeysk, Russian SFSR, Soviet Union

Chess career
- Country: Soviet Union (until 1992); Russia (1992–2004); Germany (since 2004)
- Title: Grandmaster (2008)
- Peak rating: 2519 (October 2004)

Jakob Gotlibovich Meister is a Russian-German chess grandmaster.

== Chess career ==
He was awarded the Grandmaster title in 2008, after achieving his norms at the:

- Aeroflot Open A in February 2002
- Aeroflot Festival Tournament A in February 2004
- Marianske Lazne GM tournament A2 in January 2008

In May 2014, he won the Königsjäger Spring tournament, defeating Robert Rabiega on tiebreak scores.

In December 2014, he won the International Winter Open in Berlin.

In August 2017, he won the German Senior Blitz Chess Championship, half a point ahead of runner-up Bodo Schmidt.
