= Valerij Popov =

Russian chess grandmaster (born 1974)

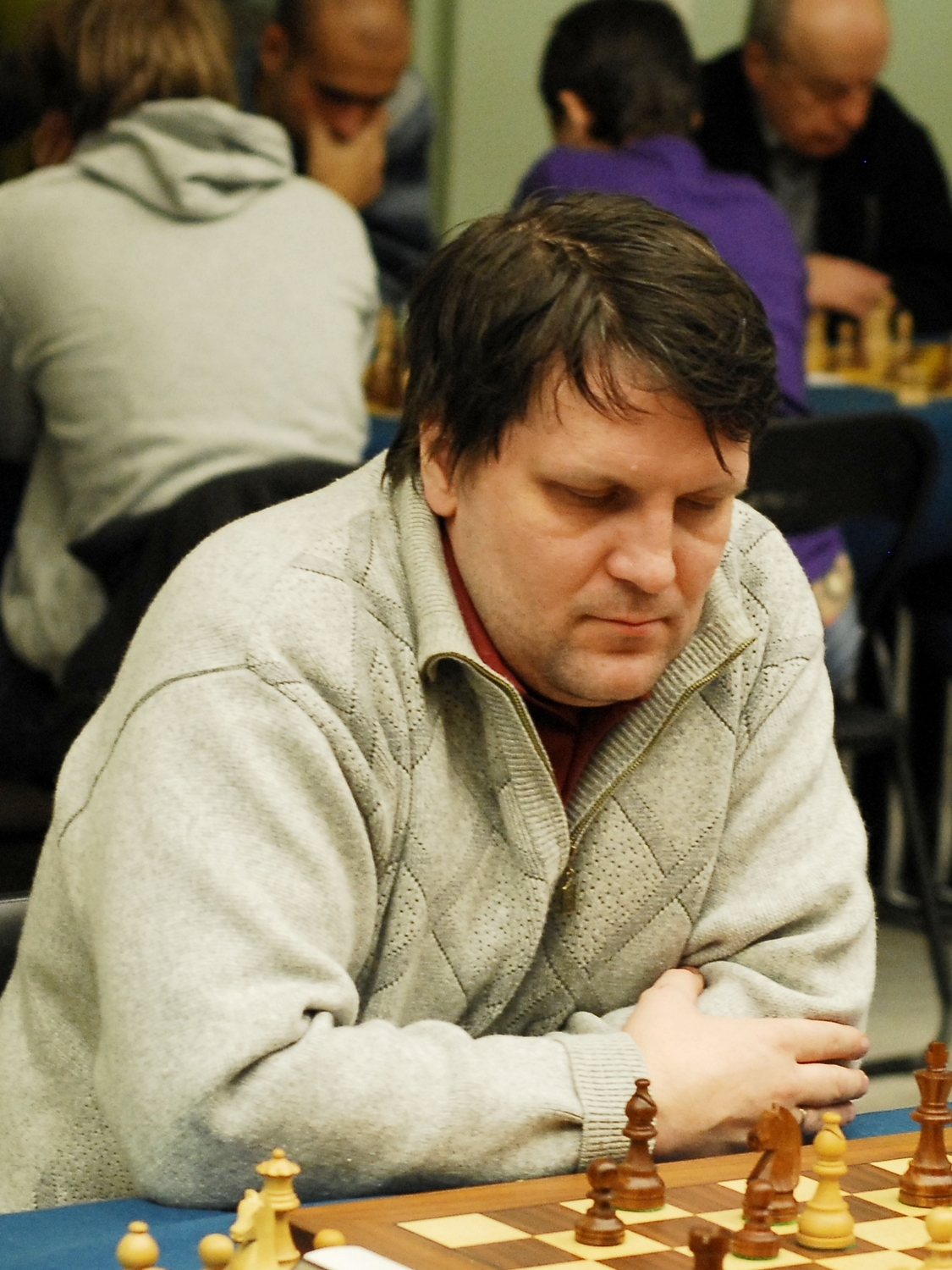
- Popov at the European Rapid Championship 2012

Personal information
- Born: September 10, 1974 (age 51) Saint Petersburg, Russia

Chess career
- Country: Russia
- Title: Grandmaster (1999)
- FIDE rating: 2521 (July 2026)
- Peak rating: 2595 (September 2009)

Valerij Sergeyevich Popov (born 10 September 1974) is a Russian chess player. He was awarded the title Grandmaster by FIDE in 1999.

Popov won the championship of Saint Petersburg, his native city, in 2001 and 2006. In 2014 he shared first place with Denis Yevseev, who took the title on tiebreak score. Popov competed in the inaugural FIDE World Cup in 2005. Here he was knocked out by Alexander Onischuk in the first round by a score of ½–1½.

In 2008, Popov finished second in the European Rapid Chess Championship in Warsaw, Poland with a score of 10½/13 points. Ten years later, he took the gold medal in this championship in Skopje, Macedonia with the same score.
