= Bellaccord Electro =

Latvian record label

Bellaccord Electro, generally known as Bellaccord, was the largest record label in Latvia.

== History ==
The label was founded in 1931 by Helmars Rudzitis, owner of the publishing house Grāmatu Draugs (friend of the book), who organized recording and pressing facilities in Riga at Kalnciema ielā, 40 (the building still exists). A subsidiary pressing facility was organized in Estonia.

The company was nationalized in October 1940, after the annexation of Latvia by the Soviet Union. However the new director, Jēkabs Riekstiņš, soon hired the former owner to manage the factory. Records pressed during that period were marked by letters "N. U." (nationalized enterprise) in the upper part of the labels.

Since May 21, 1941, it has been planned for the factory to be renamed to Latvijas skaņuplašu fabrika (Latvian factory of gramophone records). However, there is no evidence that a decision had been implemented before Riga was occupied by German troops in July 1941. Under German administration, the factory was re-privatized on March 1, 1942, and returned to Helmars Rudzitis. It operated until 1944. After the return of Soviet authorities, the factory was re-opened in April 1945 and used the original Bellaccord name until 1949. From 1948, it operated without the word Electro on its labels. In 1950 it was renamed Rīgas skaņuplašu fabrika / Рижский завод грампластинок (i.e. Riga's gramophone records factory), then Baltija (1957), Līgo (1958–61) and finally Melodija (1961–64).

In 1964, almost all Soviet recording and pressing facilities were united under the umbrella label Мелодия (Melodiya), however the names of certain factories (including the one in Riga) remained on the labels, although in small print. After the break-up of the USSR, the Riga's factory was owned by Alexander Kutikov's company Sintez Records and renamed RiTonis (1992). The last record was issued in 1993 and the label was bankrupted in 1999.

== Indirect descendants ==
In mid-1950s, a series of 100 Bellaccord Electro records was reissued under the original label in the U.S. and Australia. As a commemoration to the pre-WWII Estonian branch of the Bellaccord Electro, in 1958–1972 in Stockholm there was a label Bellacord (spelled with one "c") specializing in ethnic Estonian music.
