= Evgeniy Solozhenkin =

Russian chess grandmaster (born 1966)

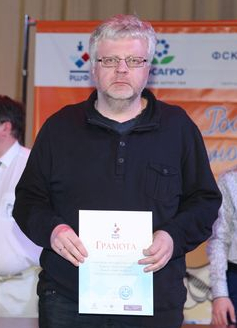
- Solozhenkin in 2016

Personal information
- Native name: Евгений Соложенкин
- Born: 31 July 1966 (age 59) Saint Petersburg, Russian SFSR, Soviet Union

Chess career
- Country: Russia
- Title: Grandmaster (1993)
- Peak rating: 2565 (July 1996)

Evgeniy Aleksandrovich Solozhenkin (Russian: Евгений Александрович Соложенкин; born 31 July 1966) is a Russian chess grandmaster.

== Tournament results ==
- 1986: wins, at age 20, the 59th Leningrad championship
- 1993: wins the Cappelle-la-Grande Open in France (416 players), above 19 GMs and 61 IMs
- 1998: wins for the second time the championship of his hometown (now called Saint Petersburg); wins the "Heart of Finland" tournament in Jyväskylä
- 1999: wins the 41st Reggio Emilia chess tournament; 5th at the Paris championship (won by Ashot Anastasian, 225 players)
- 2000: 3rd at the Padua Open, after Gennadi Timoshenko and Erald Dervishi.

For ChessBase he published the CD, Opposite-Coloured Bishop Endgames.

His daughter (and chess student) Elizaveta Solozhenkina (born 2003) is also a chess master.

== Controversies ==
Solozhenkin accused Bibisara Assaubayeva in several Internet articles of cheating during the World Youth U14 Championship in Uruguay in September 2017. The FIDE Ethics Commission suspended Solozhenkin for making unsubstantiated allegations of cheating. A group of grandmasters wrote an open letter in support of Solozhenkin. Assaubayeva's family sued Solozhenkin for defamatory allegations made in public and in the media that offended Assaubayeva's honor and dignity. The Moscow Appellate Court ordered Solozhenkin to apologize, disavow his allegations to the media, delete the defamatory articles, and pay a compensatory sum of 100,000 rubles.
