= Anatoly Bykhovsky =

Israeli chess grandmaster (born 1988)

Personal information
- Native name: אנטולי ביחובסקי
- Born: November 19, 1988 (age 37) Samara, Russia

Chess career
- Country: Israel
- Title: Grandmaster (2010)
- FIDE rating: 2499 (July 2026)
- Peak rating: 2536 (November 2011)

Anatoly Bykhovsky (Hebrew: אנטולי ביחובסקי, Russian: Анатолий Быховский; born November 19, 1988) is an Israeli chess grandmaster since 2010 and an International Master since 2008. He is the 23rd best player in Israel and 995th player in the world. His highest rating was 2536 (in November 2011).

In 2012, Bykhovsky participated in the National Open. He ended the tournament with a 4.5 score and 5th in rankings. He also competed in the Pro Chess League on Chess.com in 2018.
