= Vyacheslav Osnos =

Russian chess player (1935–2009)

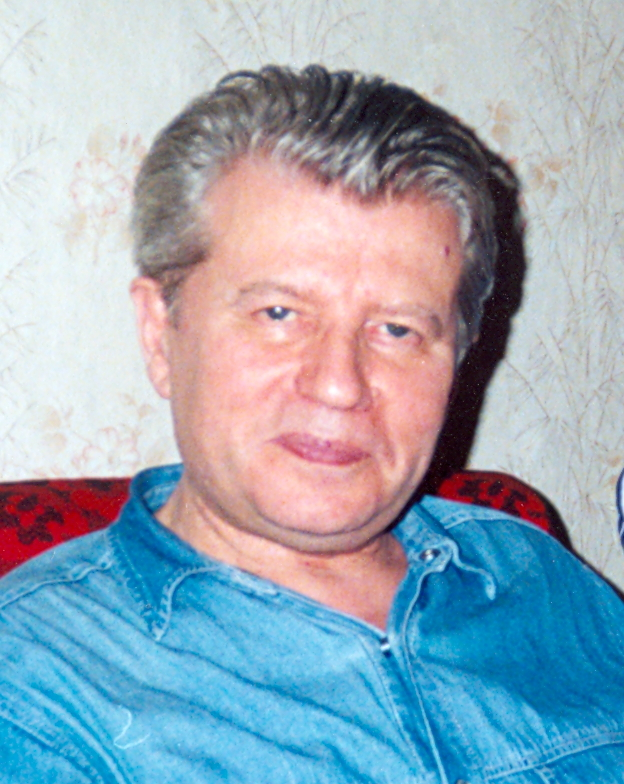
- Osnos in 2006

Personal information
- Born: Vyacheslav Vulfovich Osnos; 24 July 1935 Luga, Soviet Union
- Died: 27 August 2009 (aged 74) Saint Petersburg, Russia

Chess career
- Country: Soviet Union (until 1991); Russia (since 1991)
- Title: International Master (1965); Honoured Trainer of the Russian SFSR (1974)
- Peak rating: 2540 (July 1971)
- Peak ranking: No. 39 (July 1971)

Vyacheslav Vulfovich Osnos (Russian: Вячеслав Вульфович Оснос; 24 July 1935, Luga – 27 August 2009, Saint Petersburg) was a Russian chess player, trainer and author. He was awarded the International Master title in 1965, and was champion of Leningrad in 1971 and 1980.

== Chess career ==
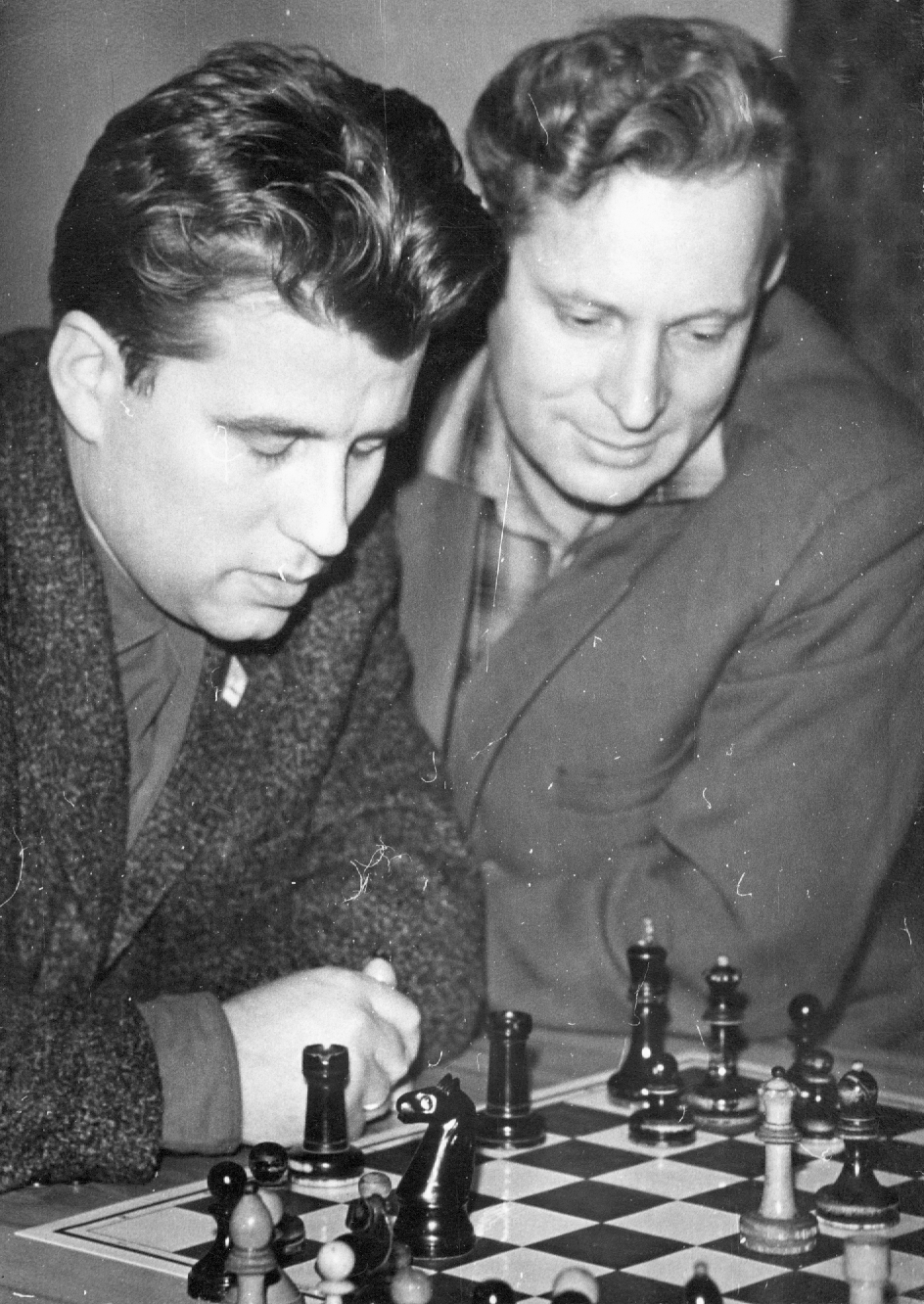
Vyacheslave Osnos (left) and Pavel Kondratyev, c. 1965

Osnos competed in six Soviet championship finals from 1963 to 1968. In 1963, he won the semifinal of the Soviet championship ahead of Boris Spassky, Alexei Suetin, Igor Bondarevsky and Yuri Averbakh, but finished last of 20 in the final. In 1964, he finished second behind Viktor Korchnoi in the Leningrad City Chess Championship, which doubled as a semi-final for the Soviet championship, and finished equal tenth in the final, also won by Korchnoi. In 1965, he came third in the semifinal, and achieved his best result in a Soviet championship final, finishing in eighth place behind Leonid Stein, but ahead of David Bronstein and Korchnoi. In 1966 he finished in equal fourteenth place; in 1967, in the first Soviet championship to be run under the Swiss system, he finished in a 10-way tie for eighth place out of 126 competitors. In his final Soviet championship in late 1968/early 1969, he finished in equal eleventh place.

In 1968, Osnos finished =1st in the Leningrad City Chess Championship, but lost the playoff against Valery Bykov and Alexander Cherepkov. The following year, he won an international tournament in Debrecen. In 1970, he finished third in the Leningrad championship, won by Vladimir Karasev. He won the Leningrad championship in 1971 and in 1980.

Between 1968 and 1974 he was one of Viktor Korchnoi's seconds, and in 1974 he was awarded the title of Honoured Trainer of the Russian SFSR. Osnos assisted Korchnoi during his narrowly lost World Championship Candidate's final match against Anatoly Karpov in Moscow 1974.

Osnos co-authored with Peter Wells The Complete Richter-Rauzer, published by Batsford in 1998.
