= Alexander Khalifman =

Russian chess grandmaster (born 1966)

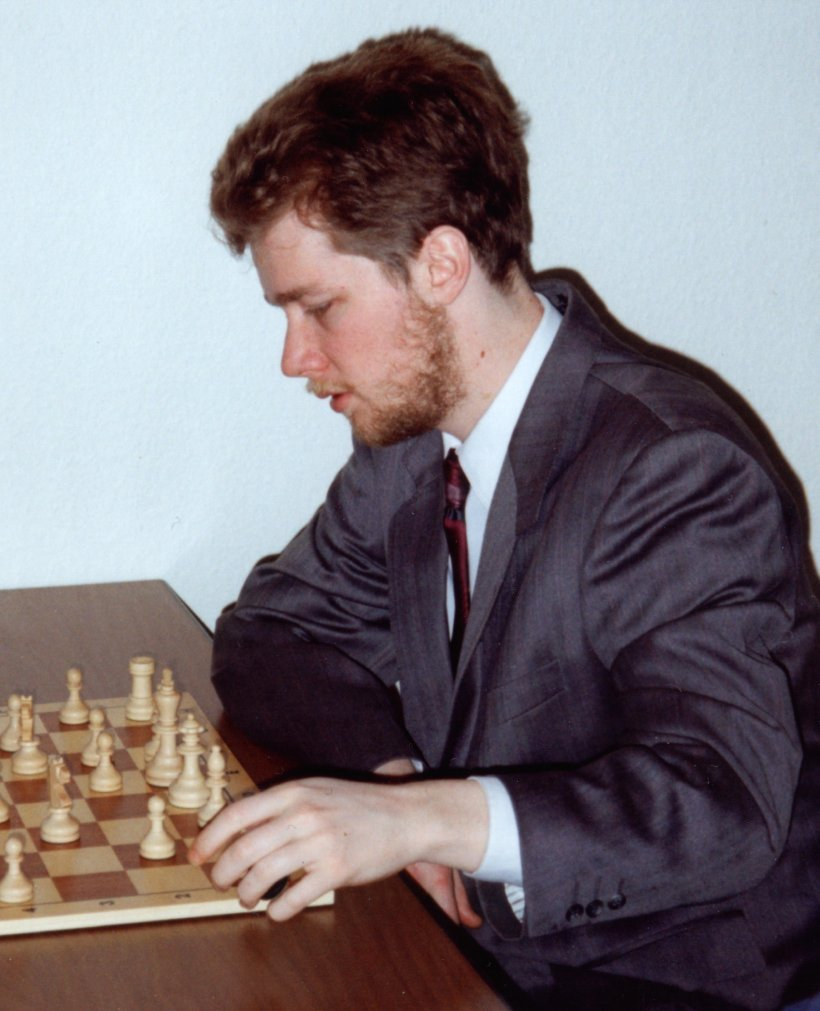

Personal information
- Born: Alexander Valeryevich Khalifman; 18 January 1966 (age 60) Leningrad, Russian SFSR, Soviet Union

Chess career
- Country: Soviet Union (until 1991); Germany (1991–1992); Russia (since 1992)
- Title: Grandmaster (1990)
- World Champion: 1999–2000 (FIDE)
- FIDE rating: 2597 (September 2026)
- Peak rating: 2702 (October 2001)
- Peak ranking: No. 10 (July 1991)

Alexander Valeryevich Khalifman (Russian: Алекса́ндр Вале́рьевич Халифма́н; born 18 January 1966) is a Russian chess player and writer. Awarded the title of Grandmaster by FIDE in 1990, he was FIDE World Chess Champion in 1999.

== Early life ==
Alexander Khalifman was born in St Petersburg into a Jewish family of engineers. Khalifman's grandfather was the director of the Chaliapin Museum; the other half of the family came from the Baltics. According to family legend, Khalifman's ancestor was one of the commanders of Russian monitor Rusalka.

== Tournament career ==
Khalifman won the 1982 Soviet Union Youth Championship, the 1984 Soviet Union Youth Championship, the 1985 European Under-20 Championship in Groningen, the 1985 and 1987 Moscow championships, 1990 Groningen, 1993 Ter Apel, 1994 Chess Open of Eupen, 1995 Chess Open St. Petersburg, the Russian Championship in 1996, the Saint Petersburg Championship in 1996 and 1997, 1997 Chess Grand Master Tournament St. Petersburg, 1997 Aarhus, 1997 and 1998 Bad Wiessee, 2000 Hoogeveen.

He was a member of the gold medal-winning Russian team at the Chess Olympiads in 1992, 2000 and 2002, and at the 1997 World Team Chess Championship.

Khalifman gained the Grandmaster title in 1990 with one particularly good early result being his first place in the 1990 New York City Open ahead of a host of strong players. His most notable achievement was winning the FIDE World Championship in 1999, a title he held until the following year. He was rated 44th in the world at the time, while "Classical" World Champion Garry Kasparov was rated No. 1. Khalifman said after the tournament, "Rating systems work perfectly for players who play only in round robin closed events. I think most of them are overrated. Organizers invite same people over and over because they have the same rating and their rating stays high." Khalifman played in the Linares chess tournament next year, and performed credibly (though placing below joint winner Kasparov).

== Coaching ==
With his trainer Gennady Nesis (de) he runs a chess academy in St. Petersburg, called "The Grandmaster Chess School", since November 1998. Khalifman has been coaching Vladimir Fedoseev since 2011.

Khalifman has been coaching the Azerbaijani national team since 2013 and is its captain. He acted as a second to Alisa Galliamova in the Women's World Chess Championship 1999 and to Anna Ushenina in the Women's World Chess Championship 2013.

In March 2022, he signed an open letter of Russian GMs to Vladimir Putin urging him to stop the Russian invasion of Ukraine.

== Books ==
- Alexander Khalifman; Sergei Soloviev; Olga Krylova (1994). Mikhail Tal Games 1949–1962. Chess Stars. ISBN 978-1-199-58317-8.
- Alexander Khalifman; Sergei Soloviev; Olga Krylova (1995). Mikhail Tal Games 1963–1972. Chess Stars. ISBN 954-8782-02-2.
- Alexander Khalifman; Sergei Soloviev; Olga Krylova (1996). Mikhail Tal Games 1973–1981. Chess Stars. ISBN 978-954-8782-03-6.
- Alexander Khalifman; Sergei Soloviev; Olga Krylova (1996). Mikhail Tal Games 1982–1992. Chess Stars. ISBN 954-8782-04-9.
- Alexander Khalifman; Leonid Yudasin (1997). Jose Raul Capablanca – Games 1901–1926. Chess Stars. ISBN 9548782065.
- Alexander Khalifman; Leonid Yudasin (1997). Jose Raul Capablanca – Games 1927–1942. Chess Stars. ISBN 9548782065.
- Sergei Soloviev; Alexander Khalifman (1998). Emanuel Lasker 1 – Games 1889–1903. Chess Stars. ISBN 9548782073.
- Sergei Soloviev; Alexander Khalifman (1999). Emanuel Lasker 2 – Games 1904–1940. Chess Stars. ISBN 9548782103.
- Alexander Khalifman; Sergei Soloviov (1999). Mikhail Chigorin – The First Russian Grandmaster. Chess Stars. ISBN 9548782111.
- Alexander Khalifman; Sergei Soloviov (2000). Mikhail Botvinnik – Games 1924–1948. Chess Stars. ISBN 9548782138.
- Alexander Khalifman; Sergei Soloviov (2001). Mikhail Botvinnik – Games 1951–1970. Chess Stars. ISBN 9548782170.
- Alexander Khalifman; Sergei Soloviov (2002). Alexander Alekhine – Games 1902–1923. Chess Stars. ISBN 954-8782-21-9.
- Alexander Khalifman; Sergei Soloviov (2002). Alexander Alekhine – Games 1923–1934. Chess Stars. ISBN 954-8782-23-5.
- Alexander Khalifman (2002). Opening for Black according to Karpov. Chess Stars. ISBN 978-9548782166.
- Alexander Khalifman (2000–2002). Opening for White according to Kramnik 1.♘f3 (5 volumes). Chess Stars
- Alexander Khalifman (2003–2012). Opening for White according to Anand 1. e4 (14 volumes). Chess Stars
- Alexander Khalifman (2006–2011). Opening for White according to Kramnik 1.♘f3 (revised edition, 5 volumes). Chess Stars
- Alexander Khalifman; Sergei Soloviov (2019). The Modern Scotch. Chess Stars. ISBN 978-6197188240.
- Alexander Khalifman; Sergei Soloviov (2019). Squeezing 1.e4 e5: A Solid Strategic Approach. Chess Stars. ISBN 9786197188264.
- Alexander Khalifman; Sergei Soloviev (2020). Squeezing the Sicilian Alapin Variation. Chess Stars. ISBN 9786197188288.

== See also ==
- List of Jewish chess players

Sporting positions
| Preceded by Anatoly Karpov | FIDE World Chess Champion; 1999–2000 | Succeeded by Viswanathan Anand |
| Preceded by Peter Svidler | Russian Chess Champion; 1996 | Succeeded by Peter Svidler |
