= Alexander Cherepkov =

Personal information
- Born: October 30, 1920 Petrograd, RSFSR
- Died: July 12, 2009 (aged 88) Saint Petersburg, Russia

Chess career
- Country: Russia
- Title: International Master (1984)
- Peak rating: 2475 (May 1974)

Alexander Vasilyevich Cherepkov (Russian: Александр Васильевич Черепков, 30 October 1920 – 12 July 2009) was a Soviet and Russian International Master of chess. He was champion of Leningrad three times: 1967, 1968 (after a playoff), and 1982 (after a playoff). He played in three Soviet finals (1961, 1967, and 1968), and was awarded his IM title at the age of 64 in 1984, one of the oldest players to have reached this standard.

== Biography ==
Alexander Vasilyevich Cherepkov was born in Leningrad. He served in the Soviet Red Army during World War II, and was decorated four times. He was a Soviet Master from the late 1940s, but took some time to climb through the deep hierarchy of talent. His first important result was clear 1st at Yaroslavl 1948 with 12.5/17 (this was likely a Soviet Championship quarter-final). His first attempt to qualify for the Soviet final saw him score 6.5/16 in the semi-final at Moscow, 1949. In the Leningrad Championship of 1950 he scored 7/13 for 6th place, but he fell short again at the Soviet semi-final level (Tartu 1950) with 5.5/15.

Improving gradually, he made 50 per cent in two Master tournaments in Leningrad. In 1955 he scored 9/18, with the winner Vladimir Antoshin, and in 1957, he scored 9.5/19, with the winners Boris Spassky and Alexander Tolush. At Vilnius 1960, he made 11.5/17 in the Soviet semi-final to advance to his first final at Moscow 1961 (URS-ch28), and scored a respectable 7.5/19; the winner was Tigran Petrosian. A good result followed, 9.5/17 in the Spartak Club Championship at Minsk 1962, won by Anatoly Bannik. Chessmetrics.com, which rates historical chess performances, ranks Cherepkov as 34th in the world in May 1961 with a 2630 rating.

Cherepkov kept his strength and improved gradually as he got older. He won the first of his three Leningrad Championships in 1967 at age 47, and repeated the next year following a playoff. He qualified for the Soviet final in 1967 at Kharkov (URS-ch35); this was a Swiss format event with more than 100 players. He made his third and last appearance in the Soviet final at Alma Ata 1968 (URS-ch36), but could manage just 4.5/19. The next decade was filled with appearances in minor events and team championships, with mixed results.

He had a very good tournament at the Sokolsky Memorial, Minsk 1981, scoring 8.5/15 to tie for 5th–7th places; the winner was Valery Chekhov. Cherepkov won his third Leningrad title in 1982 after a playoff. He then put together the best result of his career, winning the 1984 Leningrad White Knights tournament with 8/13, ahead of several Grandmasters. This was a sensational achievement at age 64. He earned the International Master title. Another superb showing at age 70 came in the 1990 Leningrad International, where he finished clear 2nd with 9.5/13, behind Konstantin Sakaev.
