= List of chess books (A–F) =

This is a list of chess books that are used as references in articles related to chess. The list is organized by alphabetical order of the author's surname, then the author's first name, then the year of publication, then the alphabetical order of title.

As a general rule, only the original edition should be listed except when different editions bring additional encyclopedic value. Examples of exceptions include:

- When various editions are different enough to be considered as nearly a different book, for example for opening encyclopedias when each edition is completely revised and has even different authors (example: Modern Chess Openings).
- When the book is too old to have an ID (ISBN, OCLC number, ...) that makes it easy for the reader to find it. In that case, both the first and the last edition can be indicated (example: My 60 Memorable Games).

Authors with five books or more have a sub-section title on their own, to increase the usability of the table of contents (see at right). When a book was written by several authors, it is listed once under the name of each author.

== A ==
=== Aagaard, Jacob ===
- Aagaard, Jacob (1998). Easy Guide to the Panov-Botvinnik Attack. Everyman Chess. ISBN 978-1-85744-563-3.
- Aagaard, Jacob (2000). Easy Guide to the Sveshnikov Sicilian. Everyman Chess. ISBN 978-1-85744-280-9.
- Aagaard, Jacob (2001). Dutch Stonewall. Everyman Chess. ISBN 978-1-85744-252-6.
- Aagaard, Jacob (2002). Queen's Indian Defence. Everyman Chess. ISBN 1-85744-300-4.
- Aagaard, Jacob (2004). Excelling at Chess Calculation. Everyman Chess. ISBN 978-1-85744-360-8.
- Aagaard, Jacob (2004). Excelling at Combinational Play. Everyman Chess. ISBN 978-1-85744-345-5.
- Aagaard, Jacob (2004). Excelling at Technical Chess. Everyman Chess. ISBN 978-1-85744-364-6.
- Aagaard, Jacob (2004). Starting Out: The Grunfeld. Everyman Chess. ISBN 978-1-85744-350-9.
- Aagaard, Jacob (2006). Practical Chess Defence. Quality Chess. ISBN 978-91-975244-4-5.
- Aagaard, Jacob (2008). The Attacking Manual: Basic Principles. Quality Chess. ISBN 978-91-976004-0-8.
- Aagaard, Jacob (2008). The Attacking Manual 2: Technique and Praxis. Quality Chess. ISBN 978-91-976004-1-5.

- Abrahams, Gerald (1950). Chess (Teach Yourself S). English Universities Press. ISBN 0-340-26417-9.
- Abrahams, Gerald (1960). The chess mind. Penguin.
- Abrahams, Gerald (1973). Technique in chess. Dover Publications. OCLC 703340.
- Acers, Jude; Laven, George (2003). The Italian Gambit (and) A Guiding Repertoire for White–1.e4!. Trafford Publishing. ISBN 1-55369-604-2.
- Adams, Jimmy (1977). Main Line Najdorf. The Chess Player. ISBN 0-900928-90-5.
- Adams, Jimmy (1977). Najdorf Poisoned Pawn. The Chess Player. ISBN 0-906042-07-0.
- Adams, Jimmy (1978). Sicilian Najdorf Polugaevsky Variation. The Chess Player. ISBN 0-906042-09-7.
- Adams, Weaver W. (1939). White to Play and Win. Ishi Press (2007 ed.). ISBN 978-0-923891-83-1. (2007 ed.).
- Adams, Weaver W. (1946). Simple Chess. OCLC 8157445.
- Adams, Weaver W. (1959). Absolute Chess. OCLC 20876567.
- Adams, Weaver W. (1959). "How to Play Chess". OCLC 22300203.
- Addison, Stephen (1990). Book of Extraordinary Chess Problems. Crowood. ISBN 978-1-85223-240-5.

=== Adorján, András ===
- Adorján, András; Dory, Jeno (1987). Winning With the Grunfeld. Macmillan. ISBN 0-02-016080-1.
- Adorján, András (1989). Black is OK!. Batsford. ISBN 978-0-7134-5790-2.
- Adorján, András (1998). Black is O.K. in Rare Openings. Caissa Books.
- Adorján, András (2004). Black is Still OK!. Batsford. ISBN 978-0-7134-8870-8.
- Adorján, András (2005). Black is OK Forever!. Batsford. ISBN 978-0-7134-8942-2.
- Adorján, András (2016). Black is Back!. New in Chess. ISBN 978-9-0569-1661-9.

=== Alburt, Lev ===
- Alburt, Lev; Schiller, Eric (1985). The Alekhine for the Tournament Player. American Chess Promotions. ISBN 0-7134-1596-7.
- Alburt, Lev; Krogius, Nikolai (1999). Just the Facts!: Winning Endgame Knowledge in One Volume. Newmarket Press. ISBN 978-1-889323-06-0.
- Alburt, Lev; Chernin, Alexander (2001). Pirc Alert!. W W Norton & Co Inc. ISBN 978-1-889323-07-7.
- Alburt, Lev (2002). Building Up Your Chess: The Art of Accurate Evaluation and Other Winning Techniques. Newmarket Press. ISBN 978-1-889323-08-4.
- Alburt, Lev; Dzindzichashvili, Roman; Perelshteyn, Eugene (2006). Chess Openings for White, Explained: Winning with 1. e4. Chess Information And Research Center. ISBN 978-1-889323-11-4.

=== Alekhine, Alexander ===
- Alekhine, Alexander (1921). Das Schachleben in Sowiet-Russland (in German). Kagan.
- Alekhine, Alexander (1924). Book of the Hastings International Masters Chess Tournament 1922.
- Alekhine, Alexander (1924). Mis mejores partidas 1908–1923 (in Spanish). Afrodisio Aguado (1924 ed.); David McKay (1972 ed.).
- Alekhine, Alexander (1925). Das Grossmeister turnier New York 1924 (in German). De Gruyter (1925 ed.); Dover (1984 ed.). ISBN 978-0486207520. (1984 ed.).
- Alekhine, Alexander (1926). La valeur theoretique du tournoi de Baden-Baden (in French).
- Alekhine, Alexander; Euwe, Max (1927). De Schaakwedstijd Aljechin-Euwe 1926 (in Dutch).
- Alekhine, Alexander; Kmoch, Hans; Maróczy, Géza; Nimzowitsch, Aron (1928). Das erste International Schachturnier in Kecskemet 1927 (in German).
- Alekhine, Alexander (1928). Das New Yorker Schach-Turnier 1927 (in German).
- Alekhine, Alexander (1932). Auf dem Wege zur Weltmeisterschaft 1923–1927 (in German).
- Alekhine, Alexander; Hatton-Ward (1932). Sixty-Six Master Games played in the London International Chess Tournament 1932.
- Alekhine, Alexander (1935). International und 37 Schweizerisches Schachturnier in Zuerich 1934 (in German).
- Alekhine, Alexander (1936). Deux cents parties d'échecs, 1908–1927 (in French).
- Alekhine, Alexander; Euwe, Max (1936). Aljechin-Euwe Weltkampfbuch 1935 (in German).
- Alekhine, Alexander (1937). The Book of the Nottingham International Chess Tournament.
- Alekhine, Alexander; Euwe, Max (1938). The World Chess Championship 1937.
- Alekhine, Alexander (1939). My Best Games of Chess 1924–1937. Harcourt (1939 ed.); David McKay (2000 ed.). ISBN 978-0679140245. (2000 ed.).
- Alekhine, Alexander (1944). Curso a Arturo Pomar (in Spanish).
- Alekhine, Alexander (1944). Grau Torneo International de ajedrez Madrid Oktobre 1943 (in Spanish).
- Alekhine, Alexander; Peres, Aguilera (1945). Ajedrez Hupermoderno: estudio de las escuelas ajedrecistas a traves de una selection de partidas de grandes maestros de todas las epocas (in Spanish). Castilla.
- Alekhine, Alexander (1946). Legado! El campeonato mundial, Match Reshewsky-Kashdan, El campeonato de E.E.U.U. 1943, Curso de ajedrez a Arturo Pomar (in Spanish).
- Alekhine, Alexander (1980). 107 Great Chess Battles. Oxford University Press. ISBN 978-0-19-217590-8.

- Alexander, Conel H. O'D. (1972). Fischer v. Spassky. Vintage. ISBN 0-394-71830-5.
- Alföldy, Laszló; Barcza, Gedeon; Kapu, Jenö (1975). Die Weltmeister des Schachspiels (in German). Corvina Verlag. ISBN 978-3-88086-049-0.
- Alfonso X of Castile (1283). Libro de los juegos.
- Angos, Alex (2005). You Move ... I Win!: A Lesson in Zugzwang. Thinkers' Press, Inc. ISBN 978-1-888710-18-2.

=== Aplin, Nick ===
- Aplin, Nick; Karolyi, Tibor (2007). Kasparov's Fighting Chess 1993–1998. Batsford. ISBN 978-0-7134-8994-1.
- Aplin, Nick; Karolyi, Tibor (2007). Kasparov's Fighting Chess 1999–2005. Batsford. ISBN 978-0-7134-8984-2.
- Aplin, Nick; Karolyi, Tibor (2007). Endgame Virtuoso Anatoly Karpov. New In Chess. ISBN 978-90-5691-202-4.
- Aplin, Nick; Karolyi, Tibor (2009). Kasparov: How His Predecessors Misled Him About Chess. Batsford. ISBN 978-1-906388-26-3.
- Aplin, Nick; Karolyi, Tibor (2009). Genius in the Background. Quality Chess. ISBN 978-1-906552-37-4.

- Ashley, Maurice (2009). The Most Valuable Skills in Chess. Gambit. ISBN 978-1-904600-87-9.
- Atkinson, George (1998). Chess and Machine Intuition. Intellect. ISBN 1-871516-44-7.

=== Averbakh, Yuri ===
- Averbakh, Yuri (1966). Chess Endings: Essential Knowledge. Pergamon (1966 ed.); Macmillan Publishing Company (1993 ed.). ISBN 978-1857440225. (1993 ed.).
- Averbakh, Yuri; Maizelis, I. (1974). Comprehensive Chess Endings: Pawn Endings. Chess Digest (1974 ed.); Elsevier Science & Technology (1987 ed.). ISBN 978-0080320434. (1987 ed.).
- Averbakh, Yuri (1975). Comprehensive Chess Endings: Queen and Pawn Endings. Chess Digest (1975 ed.); Macmillan Publishing Company (1989 ed.). ISBN 978-0080269030. (1989 ed.).
- Averbakh, Yuri (1976). Comprehensive Chess Endings: Bishop v. Knight Endings. Batsford. ISBN 978-0-7134-3179-7.
- Averbakh, Yuri; Chekhover, Vitaly (1977). Comprehensive Chess Endings: Knight Endings. Batsford. ISBN 978-0-7134-0552-1.
- Averbakh, Yuri (1977). Comprehensive Chess Endings: Bishop Endings. Batsford. ISBN 978-0-7134-0096-0.
- Averbakh, Yuri; Chekhover, Vitaly; Henkin, V. (1978). Comprehensive Chess Endings: Queen v. Rook/Minor Piece Endings. Batsford. ISBN 978-0-7134-0866-9.
- Averbakh, Yuri (1978). Comprehensive Chess Endings: Rook v. Minor Piece Endings. David & Charles. ISBN 978-0-7134-0868-3.
- Averbakh, Yuri (1984). Comprehensive Chess Endings:Rook endings. Pergammon. ISBN 0-08-026902-8.
- Averbakh, Yuri (1997). Chess Middlegames: Essential Knowledge. Cadogan. ISBN 978-1-85744-125-3.

- Avrukh, Boris (2008). Grandmaster Repertoire: 1.d4. Quality Chess. ISBN 978-1-906552-05-3.
- Avrukh, Boris (2010). Grandmaster Repertoire: 1.d4 Volume 2. Quality Chess. ISBN 978-1-906552-33-6.

== B ==
- Balashov, Yuri; Prandstetter, Eduard (1992). Basic Endgames. Prague Chess Agency. ISBN 80-901056-0-2.
- Bangiev, Alexander (1988). Developments in the Sicilian 2.f4 1980-88. Quadrant Marketing.
- Barcza, Gedeon; Alföldy, Laszló; Kapu, Jenö (1975). Die Weltmeister des Schachspiels (in German). Corvina Verlag. ISBN 978-3-88086-049-0.
- Barden, Leonard (1980). Play better chess with Leonard Barden. Octopus Books. ISBN 0-7064-0967-1.
- Bardwick, Todd (2004). Teaching Chess in the 21st Century. Chess Detective Press. ISBN 0-9761962-0-4.
- Bardwick, Todd (2006). Chess Workbook for Children. Chess Detective Press. ISBN 978-0976196211.
- Bardwick, Todd (2010). Chess Strategy Workbook. Chess Detective Press. ISBN 978-0976196228.
- Barsky, Vladimir (2009). The Scotch Game for White. Chess Stars. ISBN 978-954-8782-73-9.
- Barsky, Vladimir (2010). The Modern Philidor Defence. Chess Stars. ISBN 978-954-8782-77-7.
- Basman, Michael (1982). Play the St. George. Pergamon chess openings. ISBN 0-08-029718-8.
- Basman, Michael (1991). Killer Grob. Cadogan Books. ISBN 978-0-08-037131-3.
- Bauer, Christian (2005). Play 1...b6: A Dynamic and Hypermodern Opening System for Black. Everyman Chess. ISBN 1-85744-410-8.
- Bauer, Christian (2006). The Philidor Files. Everyman Chess. ISBN 1-85744-436-1.
- Bauer, Christian (2010). Play the Scandinavian. Quality Chess. ISBN 978-1-906552-55-8.
- Beasley, John D.; Whitworth, Timothy G. (1996). Endgame Magic. Batsford. ISBN 978-0-7134-7971-3.

=== Beliavsky, Alexander ===
- Beliavsky, Alexander; Mikhalchishin, Adrian (1995). Winning Endgame Technique. Batsford. ISBN 0-7134-7512-9.
- Beliavsky, Alexander; Mikhalchishin, Adrian (1999). The Two Knights Defense. Batsford. ISBN 978-0-7134-8441-0.
- Beliavsky, Alexander; Mikhalchishin, Adrian (2000). Winning Endgame Strategy. Batsford. ISBN 0-7134-8446-2.
- Beliavsky, Alexander; Mikhalchishin, Adrian (2002). Secrets of Chess Intuition. Gambit Publications. ISBN 1-901983-52-8.
- Beliavsky, Alexander; Mikhalchishin, Adrian (2003). Modern Endgame Practice. Batsford. ISBN 0-7134-8740-2.

- Bell, Robert Charles (1960). Board and Table Games from Many Civilizations. Oxford (1960 ed.); Dover (1980 ed.). ISBN 978-0486238555. (1980 ed.).
- Benjamin, Joel (2007). American Grandmaster: Four Decades of Chess Adventures. Gloucester Publishers. ISBN 978-1-85744-552-7.
- Benko, Pal; Fine, Reuben (1941). Basic Chess Endings. David McKay. ISBN 0-8129-3493-8.
- Benko, Pal (1974). The Benko Gambit. Batsford.
- Benko, Pal (1989). Chess Endgame Lessons. Library of Congress.
- Berliner, Hans (1999). The System: A World Champion's Approach to Chess. Gambit Publications. ISBN 978-1-901983-10-4.
- von Bilguer, Paul Rudolf; von Heydebrand und der Lasa, Tassilo; Schlechter, Carl (1916). Handbuch des Schachspiels (in German). Walter de Gruyter.
- Blackburne, Joseph Henry (1979). Blackburne's Chess Games. Dover. ISBN 978-0-486-23857-9.
- Bogdanov, Valentin (2009). Play the Alekhine. Gambit Publications. ISBN 978-1-906454-15-9.
- Bologan, Viktor (2008). The Chebanenko Slav According to Bologan. New In Chess. ISBN 978-90-5691-246-8.
- Borik, Otto (1986). Budapest Gambit. The Macmillan Chess Library. ISBN 978-0-02-017500-1.
- Borik, Otto (1991). Kasparov's Chess Openings: A World Champion's Repertoire. Trafalgar Square Pub. ISBN 0-943955-39-4.
- Bott, Raymond; Morrison, Stanley (1966). The Chess Player's Bedside Book. Faber & Faber.
- Botterill, George; Harding, Tim (1977). The Italian Game. Batsford. ISBN 0-7134-3261-6.
- Botvinnik, Mikhail M. (1951). One hundred selected games. Bell (1951 ed.); Dover (2003 ed.). ISBN 978-0486206202. (2003 ed.).
- Bouwmans, Erik (1992). Melody Amber Rapid Chess Tournament. Schaaknieuws. ISBN 90-73216-08-7.
- Boyer, Joseph (1951). Les Jeux d'échecs non orthodoxes.
- Brace, Edward R. (1978). Illustrated Dictionary of Chess. Fodor's Travel Publications. ISBN 978-0-679-50814-4.
- Brady, Frank (1965). Profile of a Prodigy: The Life and Games of Bobby Fischer. Nicholas Kaye (1965 ed.); Dover (1989 ed.). ISBN 978-0486259253. (1989 ed.).
- Bronstein, David (1973). 200 Open Games.
- Bronstein, David (1979). Zurich International Chess Tournament 1953. Dover Publications.
- Bronstein, David; Fürstenberg, Tom (2009). The Sorcerer's Apprentice. New In Chess (Revised and Expanded Edition). ISBN 978-90-5691-272-7.
- Brownson Jr., Orestes Augustus (1872). Book of the Second American Chess Congress, Cleveland 1871.
- Broznik, Valeri (2001). Die Tschigorin-Verteidigung (in German). Schachverlag Kania. ISBN 3-931192-21-0.
- Broznik, Valeri (2003). The Colle-Koltanowski System. Kania. ISBN 3-931192-25-3.
- Broznik, Valeri (2004). Die Sizilianisch für Mussiggänger (in German). Schachverlag Kania. ISBN 3-931192-26-1.
- Buck, C.A. (1902). Paul Morphy: his later life. Will. H. Lyons.
- Burg, Daniel B.; Just, Tim (2003). U.S. Chess Federation's Official Rules of Chess (5th ed.). McKay. ISBN 0-8129-3559-4.

=== Burgess, Graham ===
- Burgess, Graham (1993). The King's Indian for the Attacking Player. Batsford. ISBN 0-8050-2936-2.
- Burgess, Graham (1994). Winning with the Smith-Morra Gambit. Batsford. ISBN 0-8050-3574-5.
- Burgess, Graham (1995). Gambits. Batsford. ISBN 978-0-8050-3898-9.
- Burgess, Graham (1997). The Mammoth Book of Chess. Carroll & Graf (1997 ed.); Robinson Publishing (2000 ed.). ISBN 978-1841191263. (2000 ed.). Also published in hardback as Chess:Tactics and Strategy, Castle Books, 2002, ISBN 978-0-7858-1516-7
- Burgess, Graham (1998). The Quickest Chess Victories of All Time. Everyman Chess. ISBN 978-1-85744-538-1.
- Burgess, Graham; Emms, John; Nunn, John (1998). The Mammoth Book of the World's Greatest Chess Games. Carroll & Graf. ISBN 978-0-7867-0587-0.
- Burgess, Graham; Gallagher, Joe; Emms, John; Nunn, John (1999). Nunn's Chess Openings. Everyman Chess. ISBN 1-85744-221-0.
- Burgess, Graham (2000). Chess Highlights of the 20th Century. Gambit Publications. ISBN 978-1-901983-21-0.
- Burgess, Graham (2001). The Slav. Gambit. ISBN 1-901983-44-7.

== C ==
- Cafferty, Bernard; Harding, Tim (1997). Play the Evans Gambit. Cadogan. ISBN 1-85744-119-2.
- Cafferty, Bernard; Taimanov, Mark (1998). The Soviet Championships. Everyman Chess. ISBN 978-1-85744-201-4.
- Cafferty, Bernard (2002). Spassky's 100 Best Games. Hardinge Simpole Limited. ISBN 978-1-84382-000-0.
- Capablanca, José Raúl (1921). Chess Fundamentals. Kessinger Publishing (2007 ed.). ISBN 978-1432568641. (2007 ed.).
- Carter, Stephen L. (2002). The Emperor of Ocean Park. Knopf. ISBN 978-0-375-41363-6.
- Cartier, Jan R.; Hall, John (1996). Modern King's Indian Attack – A Complete System for White. Hays. ISBN 1-880673-11-8.
- Casey, Kevin (2009). Australian Chess Brilliancies. Kimberley Publications. ISBN 978-0-9806340-0-6.

=== Chandler, Murray ===
- Chandler, Murray; Barden, Leonard; Keene, Raymond (1981). The English Chess Explosion: From Miles to Short. Batsford. ISBN 0-7134-4009-0.
- Chandler, Murray (1997). The Complete c3 Sicilian. Intl Chess Enterprises. ISBN 1-879479-50-8.
- Chandler, Murray (1998). How to Beat Your Dad at Chess. Gambit. ISBN 1-901983-05-6.
- Chandler, Murray (2003). Chess Tactics for Kids. Gambit. ISBN 1-901983-99-4.
- Chandler, Murray; Milligan, Helen; McCluskey, Cindy (2004). Chess for Children. Gambit. ISBN 1-904600-06-9.

- Chekhover, Vitaly; Averbakh, Yuri (1977). Comprehensive Chess Endings: Knight Endings. Batsford. ISBN 978-0-7134-0552-1.
- Chekhover, Vitaly; Averbakh, Yuri; Henkin, V. (1978). Comprehensive Chess Endings: Queen v. Rook/Minor Piece Endings. Batsford. ISBN 978-0-7134-0866-9.

=== Chernev, Irving ===
- Chernev, Irving (1955). 1000 Best Short Games of Chess. Fireside. ISBN 978-0-671-53801-9.
- Chernev, Irving (1961). Practical Chess Endings. Simon & Schuster (1961 ed.); Dover (1969 ed.). ISBN 978-0486222080. (1969 ed.).
- Chernev, Irving (1965). The Most Instructive Games of Chess Ever Played: 62 Masterpieces of Chess Strategy. Dover. ISBN 0-486-27302-4.
- Chernev, Irving (1968). The Chess Companion. Fireside (1968 ed.); Faber & Faber (1975 ed.). ISBN 978-0571093151. (1975 ed.).
- Chernev, Irving (1976). Twelve Great Chess Players and Their Best Games. Dover (1995 ed.). ISBN 978-0486286747. (1995 ed.).
- Chernev, Irving (1978). Capablanca's Best Chess Endings: 60 Complete Games. Dover. ISBN 0-486-24249-8.
- Chernev, Irving (1989). 200 Brilliant Endgames. Dover (2003 ed.). ISBN 978-0486432113. (2003 ed.).

- Cherniaev, Alexander; Meynell, Alexander (2005). David Janowski: Artist of the Chess Board. Hardinge Simpole. ISBN 978-1-84382-168-7.
- Cherniaev, Alexander (2006). Harry Nelson Pillsbury: A Genius Ahead of His Time. Books from Europe. ISBN 5-903229-03-4.
- Cherniaev, Alexander (2008). The Samisch King's Indian Uncovered. Everyman Chess. ISBN 978-1-85744-540-4.
- Chernin, Alexander; Alburt, Lev (2001). Pirc Alert!.
- Chetverik, Maxim; Raetsky, Alexander (2005). Petroff Defence. Everyman Chess. ISBN 1-85744-378-0.
- Chetverik, Maxim; Raetsky, Alexander (2006). Queen's Gambit Accepted. Everyman Chess. ISBN 1-85744-415-9.
- Chetverik, Maxim; Raetsky, Alexander (2006). Boris Spassky: Master of Initiative. Everyman Chess. ISBN 1-85744-425-6.
- Chicco, Adriano; Rosino, Antonio (1990). Storia degli scacchi in Italia (in Italian). Marsilio. ISBN 88-317-5383-5.
- Christiansen, Larry (2000). Storming the Barricades. Gambit Publications. ISBN 978-1-901983-25-8.
- Christiansen, Larry (2004). Rocking the Ramparts. Batsford. ISBN 0-7134-8776-3.
- Collins, John W.; Korn, Walter (1957). Modern Chess Openings (9th ed.). Sir Isaac Pitman & Sons.
- Collins, Sam (2005). Understanding the Chess Openings. Gambit Publications. ISBN 978-1-904600-28-2.
- Collins, Sam (2007). Chess Explained: The c3 Sicilian. Gambit Publications. ISBN 978-1-904600-71-8.
- O'Connell, Kevin J.; Wade, Robert (1972). Bobby Fischer's Chess Games. ISBN 0-385-08627-X.
- Cook, William (1910). The Chess Players' Compendium. David McKay.
- Coudari, Camille (1999). L'Ouverture aux Échecs pour tous. Les Éditions de L'Homme. ISBN 2-7619-1508-9.
- Cox, John (2005). Starting out: Alekhine's Defence. Everyman Chess. ISBN 978-1-85744-370-7.
- Cox, John (2007). Starting Out: Sicilian Sveshnikov. Gloucester Publishers. ISBN 978-1-85744-431-5.
- Cox, John (2008). The Berlin Wall. Quality Chess. ISBN 978-91-85779-02-4.
- Crouch, Colin (1992). Trends in the King's Indian Four Pawns Attack. Trends.
- Crouch, Colin; Franco, Zenon (2007). How to Defend in Chess. Gambit. ISBN 978-1-904600-83-1.
- Crouch, Colin (2007). Chess Secrets: The Giants of Strategy. Everyman Chess. ISBN 978-1-85744-541-1.
- Crouch, Colin (2009). Chess Secrets: Great Attackers. Everyman Chess. ISBN 978-1-85744-579-4.
- Cunnington, E.E. (1933). The Modern Chess Primer. David McKay.

== D ==
- Damsky, Yakov; Polugaevsky, Lev (1988). The Art of Defence in Chess. Pergamon Press. ISBN 4871875199.
- Damsky, Yakov (2005). The Batsford Book of Chess Records. Batsford. ISBN 978-0-7134-8946-0.
- Daniels, David; Lombardy, William (1975). U.S. Championship Chess. David McKay. ISBN 0-679-13042-X.
- Davidson, Henry (1949). A Short History of Chess. David McKay (1949 ed.); Kessinger Publishing (2007 ed.). ISBN 978-1432585617. (2007 ed.).

=== Davies, Nigel ===
- Davies, Nigel (2002). The Grünfeld Defence. Everyman Chess. ISBN 1-85744-239-3.
- Davies, Nigel (2003). The Veresov. Everyman Chess. ISBN 978-1-85744-335-6.
- Davies, Nigel (2004). The Dynamic Reti. Everyman Chess. ISBN 978-1-85744-352-3.
- Davies, Nigel (2005). The Trompowsky. Everyman Chess. ISBN 1-85744-376-4.
- Davies, Nigel (2008). King's Indian Attack. Hamburg: ChessBase. ISBN 978-3-86681-071-6.
- Davies, Nigel (2008). Starting Out: The Modern. Everyman Chess. ISBN 978-1-85744-566-4.

=== De Firmian, Nick ===
- de Firmian, Nick; Korn, Walter (1990). Modern Chess Openings (13th ed.). A. & C. Black.
- de Firmian, Nick (1999). Modern Chess Openings (14th ed.). David Mc Kay.
- de Firmian, Nick; Fedorowicz, John (2004). The English Attack. Sterling. ISBN 978-0-945806-14-1.
- de Firmian, Nick (2008). Modern Chess Openings (15th ed.). McKay Chess Library. ISBN 978-0-8129-3682-7.

- Dearing, Edward (2005). Play the Nimzo-Indian. Everyman Chess. ISBN 1-85744-403-5.
- Dearing, Edward (2005). Play The Sicilian Dragon. Gambit. ISBN 1-904600-17-4.
- Dearing, Edward (2005). Challenging the Grunfeld. Quality Chess. ISBN 978-91-975243-4-6.
- Delchev, Aleksander; Agrest, Evgenij (2011). The Safest Grünfeld. Chess Stars. ISBN 978-954-8782-81-4.
- van Delft, Karel; van Delft, Merijn (2010). Developing Chess Talent. KVDC. ISBN 978-90-79760-02-2.
- DeLucia, Alessandra; DeLucia, David (2009). Bobby Fischer Uncensored.
- DeLucia, David (2007). David DeLucia's Chess Library: A Few Old Friends (Second ed.).
- DeLucia, David; DeLucia, Alessandra (2009). Bobby Fischer Uncensored.
- Dembo, Yelena (2007). Play the Grünfeld. Everyman Chess. ISBN 978-1-85744-521-3.
- Dembo, Yelena (2008). Fighting the Anti-King's Indians: How to Handle White's Tricky Ways of Avoiding the Main Lines. Everyman Chess. ISBN 978-1-85744-575-6.
- Denker, Arnold; Parr, Larry (1995). The Bobby Fischer I Knew And Other Stories. Hypermodern Press. ISBN 978-1-886040-18-2.
- Denker, Arnold (1995). My Best Games 1929–1976. Dover Publications. ISBN 0-486-24035-5. ISBN.
- Divinsky, Nathan; Keene, Raymond (1989). Warriors of the Mind. Batsford. ISBN 978-0-9513757-0-9.
- Dizon, Rommel; Penn, David A. (1998). Comprehensive Bughouse Chess. Graham Cracker Studios. ISBN 0-9669806-0-3.

=== Donaldson, John W. ===
- Donaldson, John W.; Minev, Nikolay (1992). Alekhine in the Americas. International Chess Enterprises. ISBN 978-1-879479-06-7.
- Donaldson, John W.; Minev, Nikolay (1994). Akiba Rubinstein: Uncrowned King. International Chess Enterprises. ISBN 1-879479-19-2.
- Donaldson, John W. (1995). Essential Chess Endings for Advanced Players. Chess Digest. ISBN 0-87568-263-4.
- Donaldson, John W.; Silman, Jeremy (1998). Accelerated Dragons. Everyman Chess. ISBN 1-85744-208-3.
- Donaldson, John W.; Tangborn, Eric (1999). The Unknown Bobby Fischer. International Chess Enterprises. ISBN 978-1-879479-85-2.
- Donaldson, John W. (2005). A Legend on the Road: Bobby Fischer's 1964 Simultaneous Exhibition Tour. Russell Enterprises. ISBN 978-1-888690-25-5.
- Donaldson, John W.; Hansen, Carsten (2008). A Strategic Opening Repertoire. Russell Enterprises. ISBN 978-1-888690-41-5.
- Donaldson, John W. (2009). The Life and Games of Frank Anderson. Moravian Chess. ISBN 978-80-7189-608-1.

- Donner, Jan Hein (2006). The King: Chess Pieces. New in Chess. ISBN 90-5691-171-6.
- Dorfman, Iossif (2001). The Method in Chess. Sarl Game Mind. ISBN 978-2-9572890-2-8.
- Dorfman, Iossif (2002). The Critical Moment. Sarl Game Mind. ISBN 978-2-84735-002-9.
- Dreev, Alexey (2007). My One Hundred Best Games. Chess Stars. ISBN 978-954-8782-55-5.
- Duchamp, Marcel; Shahade, Jennifer (2009). Marcel Duchamp: The Art of Chess. Readymade Press. ISBN 978-0-9800556-2-7.

=== Dunnington, Angus ===
- Dunnington, Angus (1993). How to Play - The King's Indian Attack. Batsford. ISBN 0-8050-2933-8.
- Dunnington, Angus (1998). Easy Guide to the Reti Opening. Cadogan. ISBN 978-1-85744-518-3.
- Dunnington, Angus (1998). Winning With the Catalan. International Chess Enterprises. ISBN 978-1-879479-69-2.
- Dunnington, Angus (2000). Winning Unorthodox Openings. Everyman Chess. ISBN 978-1-85744-285-4.
- Dunnington, Angus (2001). Attacking with 1.d4. Everyman Chess. ISBN 978-1-85744-258-8.
- Dunnington, Angus (2003). Chess Psyschology: Approaching the Psychological Battle Both on and Off the Board. Everyman Chess. ISBN 978-1-85744-326-4.
- Dunnington, Angus (2004). Blunders and How to Avoid Them. Everyman Chess. ISBN 978-1-85744-344-8.

- Dydyshko, Viacheslav (1989). Logic of modern chess (in Russian). Minsk.

=== Dvoretsky, Mark ===
- Dvoretsky, Mark (2003). Dvoretsky's Endgame Manual. Russell Enterprises. ISBN 978-1888690286. (2006 ed.).
- Dvoretsky, Mark (2001). Endgame Analysis. Olms. ISBN 978-3-283-00416-3.
- Dvoretsky, Mark (2002). Tactical Play. Olms. ISBN 978-3-283-00417-0.
- Dvoretsky, Mark (2002). Strategic Play. Olms. ISBN 978-3-283-00418-7.
- Dvoretsky, Mark (2003). Opening Developments. Olms. ISBN 978-3-283-00419-4.
- Dvoretsky, Mark; Yusupov, Artur (2006). Secrets of Chess Training. Olms. ISBN 978-3-283-00515-3.
- Dvoretsky, Mark; Yusupov, Artur (2007). Secrets of Opening Preparation. Olms. ISBN 978-3-283-00516-0.
- Dvoretsky, Mark; Yusupov, Artur (2008). Secrets of Endgame Technique. Olms. ISBN 978-3-283-00517-7.
- Dvoretsky, Mark; Yusupov, Artur (2008). Secrets of Positional Play. Olms. ISBN 978-3-283-00518-4.
- Dvoretsky, Mark; Yusupov, Artur (2009). Secrets of Creative Thinking. Olms. ISBN 978-3-283-00519-1.
- Dvoretsky, Mark (2008). Dvoretsky's Analytical Manual. Russell Enterprises. ISBN 978-1-888690-47-7.
- Dvoretsky, Mark; Pervakov, Oleg (2009). Studies for Practical Players. Russell Enterprises. ISBN 978-1-888690-64-4.

== E ==
- Eade, James (1996). Chess for Dummies. IDG Books. ISBN 0-7645-5003-9.
- Eales, Richard Geoffrey (1978). Cambridge Chess. Chess (1978 ed.); Hardinge Simpole (2003 ed.). ISBN 978-1843820666. (2003 ed.).
- Eales, Richard Geoffrey (1980). Chess: The History of a Game. Hardinge Simpole (2002 ed.). ISBN 978-0951375730. (2002 ed.).
- Edge, Frederick Milne (1859). The Exploits and Triumphs, in Europe, of Paul Morphy. D. Appleton & Company (1859 ed.); Dover (1973 ed.). ISBN 978-0486228822. (1973 ed.).
- Edmonds, David; Eidinow, John (2004). Bobby Fischer Goes to War. Faber & Faber. ISBN 0-571-21411-8.
- Eggers, Heiko (2005). Die Theorie der Eröffnung - Königsindischer Angriff - Das Spielsystem mit dem Aufbau Sf3/g3/d3/Lg2/0-0/Sbd2 (in German). Norderstedt: Books on Demand. ISBN 978-3-8334-3194-4.
- Eidinow, John; Edmonds, David (2004). Bobby Fischer Goes to War. Faber & Faber. ISBN 0-571-21411-8.
- Eingorn, Viacheslav (2003). Decision-Making at the Chessboard. Gambit Publications. ISBN 1-901983-87-0.
- Eingorn, Viacheslav (2006). Creative Chess Opening Preparation. Gambit Publications. ISBN 1-904600-58-1.
- Eingorn, Viacheslav (2008). Chess Explained: The French. Gambit Publications. ISBN 978-1-904600-95-4.
- Elo, Arpad E. (1978). The Rating of Chessplayers, Past and Present. Batsford. ISBN 978-0-7134-1860-6.

=== Emms, John ===
- Emms, John (1998). Easy Guide to the Nimzo-Indian. Everyman Chess. ISBN 1-85744-513-9.
- Emms, John (1998). The French Tarrasch. Batsford. ISBN 0-7134-8461-6.
- Emms, John (1999). Easy Guide to the Ruy Lopez. Everyman Chess. ISBN 1-85744-220-2.
- Emms, John; Burgess, Graham; Gallagher, Joe; Nunn, John (1999). Nunn's Chess Openings. Everyman Chess. ISBN 1-85744-221-0.
- Emms, John (1999). The Survival Guide to Rook Endings. Everyman Chess. ISBN 1-85744-235-0.
- Emms, John (2000). Most Amazing Chess Moves of All Time. Gambit. ISBN 1-901983-29-3.
- Emms, John (2000). Play The Open Games As Black. Gambit. ISBN 1-901983-27-7.
- Emms, John (2000). The Ultimate Chess Puzzle Book. Gambit. ISBN 1-901983-34-X.
- Emms, John (2001). Simple Chess. Everyman Chess. ISBN 1-85744-238-5.
- Emms, John (2002). Sicilian Kan. Everyman Chess. ISBN 1-85744-302-0.
- Emms, John (2002). Starting Out: The Sicilian. Everyman Chess. ISBN 1-85744-249-0.
- Emms, John (2003). Concise Chess. Everyman Chess. ISBN 1-85744-327-6.
- Emms, John (2003). Play the Najdorf: Scheveningen Style. Everyman Chess. ISBN 1-85744-323-3.
- Emms, John (2004). Attacking with 1e4. Everyman Chess. ISBN 1-85744-267-9.
- Emms, John (2004). More Simple Chess: Moving on from the Basic Principles. Everyman Chess. ISBN 1-85744-343-8.
- Emms, John (2004). Starting Out: Minor Piece Endgames. Everyman Chess. ISBN 1-85744-359-4.
- Emms, John (2004). Starting Out: The Queen's Indian. Everyman Chess. ISBN 1-85744-363-2.
- Emms, John; Burgess, Graham; Nunn, John (2004). The Mammoth Book of the World's Greatest Chess Games. Carroll & Graf. ISBN 0-7867-1411-5.
- Emms, John (2004). The Scandinavian. Everyman Chess. ISBN 1-85744-375-6.
- Emms, John (2005). Starting Out: King's Indian Attack. Everyman Chess. ISBN 1-85744-394-2.
- Emms, John (2005). Starting Out: The Scotch Game. Everyman Chess. ISBN 1-85744-387-X.
- Emms, John (2006). Dangerous Weapons: The Nimzo-Indian. Everyman Chess. ISBN 1-85744-424-8.
- Emms, John (2006). Dangerous Weapons: The Sicilian. Everyman Chess. ISBN 1-85744-423-X.
- Emms, John (2006). Discovering Chess Openings: Building a repertoire from basic principles. Everyman Chess. ISBN 1-85744-419-1.
- Emms, John (2006). The Survival Guide to Competitive Chess. Everyman Chess. ISBN 1-85744-412-4.
- Emms, John (2007). Eröffnungsreihe STARTING OUT Geheimnisse des königsindischen Angriffs (in German). Everyman Chess.
- Emms, John (2007). Eröffnungsreihe STARTING OUT Sizilianische Geheimnisse (in German). Everyman Chess.
- Emms, John (2007). The Survival Guide to Competitive Chess: Improve Your Results Now!. Everyman Chess. ISBN 978-1-85744-412-4.
- Emms, John (2008). Starting Out: The c3 Sicilian. Everyman Chess. ISBN 978-1-85744-570-1.
- Emms, John; Peter Wells; Richard Palliser (2009). Dangerous Weapons: Anti-Sicilians. Everyman Chess. ISBN 978-1-85744-585-5.

- Enevoldsen, Jens (1966). Verdens bedste Skak. Politikens Forlag.
- Estrin, Yakov; Glazkov, I. B. (1982). Play the King's Gambit. Pergamon Press. ISBN 978-0-08-026873-6.
- Estrin, Yakov (1983). The Two Knights Defence. Batsford. ISBN 0-7134-3991-2.
- Estrin, Yakov (1983). Gambits. Chess Enterprises. ISBN 0-931462-20-7.

=== Euwe, Max ===
- Euwe, Max; Alekhine, Alexander (1927). De Schaakwedstijd Aljechin-Euwe 1926 (in Dutch).
- Euwe, Max; Alekhine, Alexander (1936). Aljechin-Euwe Weltkampfbuch 1935 (in German).
- Euwe, Max; Alekhine, Alexander (1938). The World Chess Championship 1937.
- Euwe, Max; Kramer, Hans (1957). Middle Game: Chess. G. Bell. ISBN 978-0-7135-0431-6.
- Euwe, Max (1959). A Guide to Chess Endings. Routledge & Kegan (1959 ed.); Dover (1976 ed.). ISBN 978-0486233321. (1976 ed.).
- Euwe, Max; Kramer, Hans (1964). The Middle Game, Book One: Static Features. David Mc Kay (1964 ed.); Hays Publishing (1994 ed.). ISBN 978-1880673959. (1994 ed.).
- Euwe, Max; Kramer, Hans (1965). The Middle Game, Book Two: Dynamic and Subjective Features. G. Bell (1965 ed.); Hays Publishing (1994 ed.). ISBN 978-1880673966. (1994 ed.).
- Euwe, Max; Walter Meiden (1966). The Road to Chess Mastery: A Sure Way to Improve Your Game. David McKay. ISBN 0-679-14525-7.
- Euwe, Max (1968). The Development of Chess Style. David McKay. ISBN 0-679-14045-X.
- Euwe, Max (1973). Judgment and Planning In Chess. Bell & Sons.
- Euwe, Max; Timman, Jan (2002). Fischer World Champion!. ISBN 978-90-5691-095-2.

=== Evans, Larry ===
- Evans, Larry (1958). New Ideas in Chess. Pitman (1958 ed.); Dover (1994 ed.). ISBN 978-0486283050. (1994 ed.).
- Evans, Larry; Korn, Walter (1965). Modern Chess Openings (10th ed.). Sir Isaac Pitman & Sons.
- Evans, Larry (1970). Chess Catechism. Simon & Schuster. ISBN 978-0-671-20491-4.
- Evans, Larry (1970). Modern Chess Brilliancies. Simon & Schuster (1970 ed.); Hardinge Simpole (2002 ed.). ISBN 978-0951375747. (2002 ed.).
- Evans, Larry; Smith, Ken (1973). Chess World Championship 1972: Fischer vs. Spassky. Simon & Schuster. ISBN 0-671-21546-9.
- Evans, Larry (1974). Evans on Chess. Drake Publishers. ISBN 978-0-87749-699-1.
- Evans, Larry (2007). This Crazy World of Chess. Cardoza. ISBN 978-1-58042-218-5.

- Ewart, Bradley (1980). Chess: Man vs. Machine. Tantivy. ISBN 0-498-02167-X.

== F ==
- Falkener, Edward (1892). Games Ancient and Oriental and How to Play Them. Dover Publications. ISBN 0-486-20739-0.
- Fedorowicz, John (1990). The Complete Benko Gambit. Summit. ISBN 978-0-945806-14-1.
- Fedorowicz, John; de Firmian, Nick (2004). The English Attack. Sterling. ISBN 978-0-945806-14-1.
- Fiala, Vlastimil; Kalendovský, Jan (1992). Complete Games of Alekhine: Volume I, 1892–1921. Moravian Chess. ISBN 80-85476-10-X.

=== Fine, Reuben ===
- Fine, Reuben; Griffith, Richard; Sergeant, Philip Walsingham; White, John Herbert (1939). Modern Chess Openings (6th ed.). Whitehead & Miller.
- Fine, Reuben; Benko, Pal (1941). Basic Chess Endings. David McKay. ISBN 0-8129-3493-8.
- Fine, Reuben (1943). Ideas Behind the Chess Openings. Random House. ISBN 0-8129-1756-1.
- Fine, Reuben (1948). Practical Chess Openings. David McKay.
- Fine, Reuben (1948). The World's a Chessboard. David McKay.
- Fine, Reuben (1951). The World's Great Chess Games. Bonanza (1951 ed.); Dover (1983 ed.). ISBN 978-0486245126. (1983 ed.).
- Fine, Reuben (1952). The Middle Game in Chess. David McKay.
- Fine, Reuben (1958). A Passion for Chess. David McKay.
- Fine, Reuben (1971). The Final Candidates Match Buenos Aires, 1971: Fischer vs Petrosian. Hostel Chess Association.

- Fishbein, Alex (1993). King and Pawn Endings. American Chess Promotions. ISBN 0-939298-39-2.
- Fiske, Willard (1859). The book of the first American chess congress. Rudd & Carlton. OCLC 3734014.

=== Fischer, Bobby ===
- Fischer, Bobby (1959). Bobby Fischer's Games of Chess. Simon & Schuster.
- Fischer, Bobby (1969). My 60 Memorable Games. Simon & Schuster.
- Fischer, Bobby (1972). Bobby Fischer Teaches Chess. Bantam Books.

=== Flear, Glenn ===
- Flear, Glenn (1994). New Ideas in the Queen's Gambit Accepted. Henry Holt. ISBN 978-0-8050-3577-3.
- Flear, Glenn (2000). Improve Your Endgame Play. Everyman Chess. ISBN 1-85744-246-6.
- Flear, Glenn (2000). Open Ruy Lopez. Everyman Chess. ISBN 978-1-85744-261-8.
- Flear, Glenn (2001). Mastering the Endgame. Everyman Chess. ISBN 1-85744-233-4.
- Flear, Glenn (2004). Starting Out: Pawn Endings. Everyman Chess. ISBN 1-85744-362-4.
- Flear, Glenn (2005). Starting Out: Slav & Semi-Slav. Everyman Chess. ISBN 1-85744-393-4.
- Flear, Glenn (2007). Practical Endgame Play - beyond the basics. Everyman Chess. ISBN 978-1-85744-555-8.
- Flear, Glenn (2010). Starting Out: Open Games. Everyman Chess. ISBN 978-1-85744-630-2.

- Flesch, János (1981). The Morra (Smith) Gambit. Batsford. ISBN 0-7134-2188-6.
- Foldeak, Arpad (1966). Chess Olympiads. Corvina Press.
- Fox, Mike; James, Richard (1993). The Even More Complete Chess Addict. Faber & Faber.

=== Franco, Zenon ===
- Franco, Zenon (2005). Chess self-improvement. Gambit Publications. ISBN 1-904600-29-8.
- Franco, Zenon (2006). Winning Chess Explained. Gambit Publications. ISBN 1-904600-46-8.
- Franco, Zenon; Crouch, Colin (2007). How to Defend in Chess. Gambit. ISBN 978-1-904600-83-1.
- Franco, Zenon (2007). Chess Explained: The Modern Benoni. Gambit. ISBN 978-1-904600-77-0.
- Franco, Zenon (2008). The Art of Attacking Chess. Gambit Publications. ISBN 978-1-904600-97-8.
- Franco, Zenon (2009). Grandmaster Secrets: Counter-Attack!. Gambit Publications. ISBN 978-1-906454-09-8.

- Freeborough, E.; Ranken, C.E. (1896). Chess Openings, Ancient and Modern.
- Frolkin, Andrei; Wilts, Gerd (1991). Shortest Proof Games.
- Ftáčnik, Ľubomír; Kopec, Danny (2004). Winning the Won Game. Batsford. ISBN 0-7134-8900-6.

== See also ==
- List of chess books (G–L)
- List of chess books (M–S)
- List of chess books (T–Z)
- Chess endgame literature
