= Alekhine's Defence =

Position: a8 black rook, b8 black knight, c8 black bishop, d8 black queen, e8 black king, f8 black bishop, h8 black rook, a7 black pawn, b7 black pawn, c7 black pawn, d7 black pawn, e7 black pawn, f7 black pawn, g7 black pawn, h7 black pawn, f6 black knight, e4 white pawn, a2 white pawn, b2 white pawn, c2 white pawn, d2 white pawn, f2 white pawn, g2 white pawn, h2 white pawn, a1 white rook, b1 white knight, c1 white bishop, d1 white queen, e1 white king, f1 white bishop, g1 white knight, h1 white rook
- Moves: 1.e4 Nf6
- ECO: B02–B05
- Origin: Alexander Alekhine, Budapest 1921
- Named after: Alexander Alekhine
- Parent: King's Pawn Game

Alekhine's Defence (or the Alekhine Defence) is a chess opening that begins with the moves:

1. e4 Nf6

Black tempts White's pawns forward to form a broad pawn centre, with plans to undermine and attack the white structure later in the spirit of hypermodern defence theory. Grandmaster Nick de Firmian observes of Alekhine's Defence in MCO-15 (2008), "The game immediately loses any sense of symmetry or balance, which makes the opening a good choice for aggressive fighting players."

== History ==
The opening is named after Alexander Alekhine, who introduced it in the 1921 Budapest tournament in games against Endre Steiner and Fritz Sämisch. Four years later, the editors of the Fourth Edition of Modern Chess Openings (MCO-4) wrote:

Nothing is more indicative of the iconoclastic conceptions of the 'hypermodern school' than the bizarre defence introduced by Alekhine ... . Although opposing to all tenets of the classical school, Black allows his King's Knight to be driven about the board in the early stages of the game, in the expectation of provoking a weakness in White's centre pawns.

Alekhine did not consider himself part of a hypermodern revolution, however, and was quoted as referring to the hypermodern school of thought as "this cheap bluff, this shameless self-publicity", preferring to view such moves as adjustments or exceptions to the standard chess theory of central placement and control.

In addition to Alekhine, another early exponent of the defence was Ernst Grünfeld.

== Use ==
Alekhine's Defence was more popular in the past. For instance, Bobby Fischer used it in two games against Boris Spassky in the World Chess Championship 1972, and Viktor Korchnoi also included the defence in his repertoire, leading to its respectable reputation. Nowadays, Alekhine's Defence is not so common at the top level. De Firmian observes, "The fashion could quickly change if some champion of the opening takes up the cause, as the results Black has obtained in practice are good." The opening's current highest-rated proponent is Grandmaster (GM) Vassily Ivanchuk, although Lev Alburt played it at grandmaster level almost exclusively during his career and was responsible for many contributions in both theory and practice. Currently, GMs Alexander Shabalov and Artashes Minasian use the opening with regularity, while Levon Aronian, Michael Adams, and Hikaru Nakamura will use it on occasion. Magnus Carlsen does not employ the opening frequently but he has used it occasionally in competitive games, most notably to defeat the former world chess champion Veselin Topalov at Linares 2008.

A game by Napoléon Bonaparte from the 19th century shows one of the oldest-known examples of Alekhine's Defence being employed in a game. Napoléon won the game.

== Main line: 2.e5 Nd5 ==
After the usual 2.e5 Nd5, three main variations of Alekhine's Defence use 3.d4, but there are other options for White at this point. Two of the main lines are the Exchange Variation and the Four Pawns Attack. The Exchange Variation continues 3.d4 d6 4.c4 Nb6 5.exd6. White has some space advantage. Black can capitalise on the half-open centre with ...g6, ...Bg7 with ...Bg4 eventually being played. The Four Pawns Attack continues 3.d4 d6 4.c4 Nb6 5.f4. White has a somewhat larger space advantage though the centre is not fixed. Black has a number of options. Black can play ...Qd7 with ...0-0-0 and ...f6 putting pressure on White's d-pawn. Black can play ...Nb4 with ...c5 with idea to exchange the d-pawn. Finally, Black can play ...Be7 with ...0-0 and ...f6 attacking the centre. Minor variations include O'Sullivan's Gambit, 3.d4 b5 (intending 4.Bxb5 c5 5.dxc5?? Qa5+), and 3.d4 d6 4.Bc4, the Balogh Variation.

=== Four Pawns Attack: 3.d4 d6 4.c4 Nb6 5.f4 ===
Position: a8 black rook, b8 black knight, c8 black bishop, d8 black queen, e8 black king, f8 black bishop, h8 black rook, a7 black pawn, b7 black pawn, c7 black pawn, e7 black pawn, f7 black pawn, g7 black pawn, h7 black pawn, b6 black knight, d6 black pawn, e5 white pawn, c4 white pawn, d4 white pawn, f4 white pawn, a2 white pawn, b2 white pawn, g2 white pawn, h2 white pawn, a1 white rook, b1 white knight, c1 white bishop, d1 white queen, e1 white king, f1 white bishop, g1 white knight, h1 white rook

Four Pawns Attack: 3.d4 d6 4.c4 Nb6 5.f4

The Four Pawns Attack is White's most ambitious line against the Alekhine's, and the variation which perhaps best illustrates the basic idea behind the defence: Black allows White to make several tempo-gaining attacks on the knight and to erect an apparently imposing pawn centre in the belief that it can later be destroyed. The game can become very sharp since White must either secure an advantage in space or make use of it before Black succeeds in making a successful strike at it. Black must also play vigorously because passive play will be crushed by the white centre. In addition, while White has built a crushing centre, it also becomes undesirable to advance further – c5 can give the Black knight the d5-outpost, while d5 is usually undesirable due to it critically weakening e5. While the main target of Black is d4, the pawn on c4 also can be pressurized considerably via ...Na5. The Four Pawns Attack is not particularly popular because many White players are wary of entering a sharp tactical line that Black may have prepared. The main line continues 5...dxe5 6.fxe5 Nc6 (attacking d4) 7.Be3 (7.Nf3 allows 7...Bg4! when the pressure on d4 is very tough) Bf5 (first developing before ...e6) 8.Nc3 e6. White now usually plays 9.Nf3 to protect e5, thus preparing a potential d5 advance, and since 9...Bg4!? would cost Black a tempo, though it is still an option for Black, as it adds pressure against d4, though after an exchange with ...Bxf3 gxf3 White would get the bishop pair and an even stronger centre with the f-pawn. The main line is 9...Be7, preparing ...f6 to break apart White's centre. White used to automatically play 10.d5 in response to counter this, which can lead to complex and sharp play. However, a recent development has been 10.Be2 0-0 11.0-0 f6 12.exf6 Bxf6 13.Qd2 (preparing Rad1 and also connecting rooks) Qe7 (Black in turn connecting rooks and also preparing ...Rad8) 14.Rad1 Rad8 15.Kh1! which in Robson–Naroditsky, US Championship 2021, led to a win for White in 48 moves. The point of this move is that it prevents the ...e5 push, with the extra point of moving the king out of the a7–g1 diagonal. Black also has a weakness in the form of the isolated e6-pawn, while White still has a space advantage. An alternative move is 9...Qd7, which has become popular recently aiming to castle queenside and attack White's kingside, while 9...Bb4 is another line that tries to be more active than ...Be7, but the c3-knight has little role in the defence and thus the line is less popular than the others.

An alternative is 5...g5!?, the sharp Planinc Variation (also known as the Cambridge Gambit). If White slips up with 6.fxg5?, then 6...dxe5 wrecks White's centre and pawn structure. The line is named after GM Albin Planinc, who championed it in the 1970s. It was then taken up in the 1990s by correspondence player Michael Schirmer, whose games were noted in a recent book on Alekhine's Defence by British GM and Alekhine exponent Nigel Davies.

Alternative moves for Black after 5.f4 are 5...g6, the Fianchetto Variation, and 5...Bf5, the Trifunovic Variation.

=== Exchange Variation: 3.d4 d6 4.c4 Nb6 5.exd6 ===
Position: a8 black rook, b8 black knight, c8 black bishop, d8 black queen, e8 black king, f8 black bishop, h8 black rook, a7 black pawn, b7 black pawn, c7 black pawn, e7 black pawn, f7 black pawn, g7 black pawn, h7 black pawn, b6 black knight, d6 white pawn, c4 white pawn, d4 white pawn, a2 white pawn, b2 white pawn, f2 white pawn, g2 white pawn, h2 white pawn, a1 white rook, b1 white knight, c1 white bishop, d1 white queen, e1 white king, f1 white bishop, g1 white knight, h1 white rook

Exchange Variation: 3.d4 d6 4.c4 Nb6 5.exd6

The Exchange Variation is less ambitious than the Four Pawns Attack. White trades pawns, accepting a more modest spatial advantage. Black's main decision is whether to recapture with the solid 5...exd6, which will lead to a fairly strategic position, or the more ambitious 5...cxd6 when Black has a preponderance of pawns in the centre. The third recapture 5...Qxd6 is also possible since the fork 6.c5 can be answered by 6...Qe6+, but the line is considered inferior since Black will sooner or later need to deal with this threat.

In the sharper 5...cxd6 line, Black usually aims to attack and undermine the white pawn on d4, and possibly c4 as well. To do this, a usual plan involves a fianchetto of the king bishop to g7, playing the other bishop to g4 to remove a knight on f3 which is a key defender of d4, while black knights on b6 and c6 bear down on the white pawns on c4 and d4. Cox gave the game Jainy Gomes–Guillermo Soppe, São Paulo 2001 to illustrate Black's intentions.

==== Voronezh Variation: 5...cxd6 6.Nc3 g6 7.Be3 Bg7 8.Rc1 0-0 9.b3 ====
Position: a8 black rook, b8 black knight, c8 black bishop, d8 black queen, f8 black rook, g8 black king, a7 black pawn, b7 black pawn, e7 black pawn, f7 black pawn, g7 black bishop, h7 black pawn, b6 black knight, d6 black pawn, g6 black pawn, c4 white pawn, d4 white pawn, b3 white pawn, c3 white knight, e3 white bishop, a2 white pawn, f2 white pawn, g2 white pawn, h2 white pawn, c1 white rook, d1 white queen, e1 white king, f1 white bishop, g1 white knight, h1 white rook

Voronezh Variation: 5...cxd6 6.Nc3 g6 7.Be3 Bg7 8.Rc1 0-0 9.b3

A popular continuation of the Exchange Variation 5...cxd6 line leads to the Voronezh Variation (named after the Russian city Voronezh, where the line was pioneered by players such as Grigory Sanakoev). The Voronezh Variation is defined by the sequence 5...cxd6 6.Nc3 g6 7.Be3 Bg7 8.Rc1 0-0 9.b3 (diagram). White delays development on the kingside so that Black has trouble further developing in a such a way as to harass White's pieces and assail the centre pawns. For instance, White has yet to develop the knight to f3 which denys Black a target for the common developing idea of ...Bg4. White has also yet to develop the light-square bishop, which after 9...Nc6 (Black's most common reply according to the ChessBase Master database) White's usual response of d5 forces Black's c6-knight to either the e5 or b4 square, where it lacks a possible d3-bishop target.

The main line in the Voronezh, and the second most common reply, is 9...e5 10.dxe5 dxe5 11.Qxd8 Rxd8 12.c5 N6d7 (this retreat is forced since 12...Nd5?? loses the knight due to the 13.Rd1 pin) when Black must play carefully to unentangle and challenge the white pawn on c5. Other lines against the Voronezh include 9...f5 leading to sharp play. Other solid moves such as 9...e6, ...Bd7, ...Bf5, and ...a5 are possible as well. According to John Cox, the 9...e5 line is adequate, but Black needs to know the line well.

The Voronezh was recommended by John Emms and noted as a big problem by Nigel Davies, leading many players to opt for the more solid 5...exd6 line. However, the line offers Black less opportunity for counterplay. In this line Black usually develops the king bishop via ...Be7 and ...Bf6, because Bg5 can be bothersome against a fianchetto setup with ...g6 and ...Bg7, e.g. 6.Nc3 g6 7.Nf3 Bg7 8.Bg5.

Although the 5...exd6 structure resembles the drawish Exchange French, Black can make several attempts to unbalance the position. First, Black should play 6...Nc6 against almost any White move to prevent White from establishing an ideal Nc3, Bd3, Nge2 setup. If White attempts this, Black can strike the d3-bishop with ...Nb4. Second, Black should castle and manoeuvre ...Be7–f6. After sufficient preparation, a common Black plan is to push ...d5. If White replies with c5, Black can respond with the unusual-looking ...Nc8 with the idea to manoeuvre the knight ...Nc8–e7–f5 to strike at the weak d4-pawn.

=== Modern Variation: 3.d4 d6 4.Nf3 ===
Position: a8 black rook, b8 black knight, c8 black bishop, d8 black queen, e8 black king, f8 black bishop, h8 black rook, a7 black pawn, b7 black pawn, c7 black pawn, e7 black pawn, f7 black pawn, g7 black pawn, h7 black pawn, d6 black pawn, d5 black knight, e5 white pawn, d4 white pawn, f3 white knight, a2 white pawn, b2 white pawn, c2 white pawn, f2 white pawn, g2 white pawn, h2 white pawn, a1 white rook, b1 white knight, c1 white bishop, d1 white queen, e1 white king, f1 white bishop, h1 white rook

Modern Variation: 3.d4 d6 4.Nf3

The Modern Variation is the most common variation of the Alekhine Defence. As in the Exchange Variation, White accepts a more modest spatial advantage with the expectation of maintaining it. There are a number of possible Black responses:

- 4...Bg4, pinning the knight is the most common response, which White usually parries with 5.Be2. Black will often voluntarily surrender the bishop pair by ...Bxf3 because the white knight is a fairly strong piece, and capturing it undermines the white centre pawns. Champions of this line include Lev Alburt, Vlatko Kovačević and the late Vladimir Bagirov.
- 4...g6, preparing to fianchetto a bishop to oppose White's central pawn mass, is also often seen. This variation was played in the thirteenth game of the Match of the Century between Boris Spassky and Bobby Fischer. (The nineteenth game of the same match featured the more common 4...Bg4.) Alburt has also played this line frequently. White usually replies with 5.Bc4, the Keres Variation.
- 4...dxe5 (the Larsen Variation) eliminates the advanced pawn, but brings forward the white knight after 5.Nxe5. Challenging this knight immediately with 5...Nd7 can lead to the sharp sacrificial line 6.Nxf7!? Kxf7 7.Qh5+ Ke6. The sacrifice is, at the very least, good enough to draw after 8.Qg4+; Larsen tried the suicidal 8...Kd6? against Fischer during the Santa Monica Blitz tournament in 1966, and lost quickly after 9.c4. Black should therefore acquiesce to the perpetual check with 8...Kf7 9.Qh5+ Ke6 etc. Instead, 8.c4 can be played if White is aiming to win. White can also simply retreat the knight with 6.Nf3. If Black does not want to allow the sacrifice, other options after 5.Nxe5 are 5...g6 (the Kengis Variation) and 5...c6 (the Miles Variation). The idea behind both moves is to challenge the e5-knight with ...Nd7 only after the sacrifice on f7 has become unsound. The Kengis Variation looks more natural but White has several sharp ideas such as 6.c4 and the wild 6.Qf3!?. Therefore, 5...c6 has become more common; despite the passive look this waiting move discourages White's most ambitious continuations. Now 6.c4 can be met with the very interesting 6...Nb4!? while 6.Bc4 can either transpose to quieter lines of the Kengis or give rise to independent variations in which Black avoids the king's bishop fianchetto. White's most popular move is 6.Be2 (6.Bd3!?) when Black continues with either the immediate 6...Nd7 or 6...Bf5. Against the latter an aggressive possibility (introduced by Kasparov against Short and then improved by Judit Polgar) is 7.g4!?. In top-level chess, the line with 5...c6 has largely displaced 4...Bg4 as the main line.
- 4...c6 is passive but solid, creating a position that is difficult to attack.

In most variations, Black can play ...Bg4 to transpose into the 4...Bg4 line.

=== Balogh Variation: 3.d4 d6 4.Bc4 ===
Position: a8 black rook, b8 black knight, c8 black bishop, d8 black queen, e8 black king, f8 black bishop, h8 black rook, a7 black pawn, b7 black pawn, c7 black pawn, e7 black pawn, f7 black pawn, g7 black pawn, h7 black pawn, d6 black pawn, d5 black knight, e5 white pawn, c4 white bishop, d4 white pawn, a2 white pawn, b2 white pawn, c2 white pawn, f2 white pawn, g2 white pawn, h2 white pawn, a1 white rook, b1 white knight, c1 white bishop, d1 white queen, e1 white king, g1 white knight, h1 white rook

Balogh Variation: 3.d4 d6 4.Bc4

The first recorded use of this variation was Canal–Colle, Karlovy Vary 1929. White resigned after Black's 40th move.

Unlike several other sidelines, 4.Bc4 is fairly popular. The line contains some traps that can snare the unwary. For example, 4...dxe5 5.dxe5 Nb6?? loses the queen to 6.Bxf7+! Instead, the main line is 4...Nb6 5.Bb3, when Black has usually played 5...dxe5 6.Qh5 e6 7.dxe5 (the "old main line" according to Cox) or 5...Bf5 when White can among other things try the obstructive pawn sacrifice 6.e6. In either case, White obtains attacking chances, and so Taylor recommends 5...d5 followed by 6...e6 to reach a position akin to the French Defence.

=== Two Pawns Attack: 3.c4 Nb6 4.c5 ===
Position: a8 black rook, b8 black knight, c8 black bishop, d8 black queen, e8 black king, f8 black bishop, h8 black rook, a7 black pawn, b7 black pawn, c7 black pawn, d7 black pawn, e7 black pawn, f7 black pawn, g7 black pawn, h7 black pawn, b6 black knight, c5 white pawn, e5 white pawn, a2 white pawn, b2 white pawn, d2 white pawn, f2 white pawn, g2 white pawn, h2 white pawn, a1 white rook, b1 white knight, c1 white bishop, d1 white queen, e1 white king, f1 white bishop, g1 white knight, h1 white rook

Two Pawns Attack: 3.c4 Nb6 4.c5

The Two Pawns Attack (also known as the Lasker Attack or the Chase Variation) is also an ambitious try. White may gain attacking prospects, but it might cost a pawn to do so. White's pawns on c5 and e5 secure a spatial advantage, but the d5-square has been weakened. Unlike the Four Pawns Attack, the white centre is not as fluid and the game takes on a more strategic character.

Aesthetically, 4.c5 looks positionally suspect, since White's pawn advances have severely weakened the d5-square. White's intention is to grab space and mobility so that those strategic deficiencies are of little consequence.

Black must play 4...Nd5, whereupon White will usually challenge the knight with moves like Bc4 and Nc3. Black can defend the knight with ...c6 or ...e6, sometimes playing both. Typically, Black then challenges White's pawns on e5 and c5 with moves like ...d6 and ...b6.

The statistics presented by Cox show this variation scoring poorly for White, with all of Black's main defences scoring at least 50%.

=== Two Knights Variation: 3.Nc3 ===
Position: a8 black rook, b8 black knight, c8 black bishop, d8 black queen, e8 black king, f8 black bishop, h8 black rook, a7 black pawn, b7 black pawn, c7 black pawn, d7 black pawn, e7 black pawn, f7 black pawn, g7 black pawn, h7 black pawn, d5 black knight, e5 white pawn, c3 white knight, a2 white pawn, b2 white pawn, c2 white pawn, d2 white pawn, f2 white pawn, g2 white pawn, h2 white pawn, a1 white rook, c1 white bishop, d1 white queen, e1 white king, f1 white bishop, g1 white knight, h1 white rook

Two Knights Variation: 3.Nc3

In the Two Knights Variation, White immediately accepts doubled pawns after 3...Nxc3 for some compensation. After 4.dxc3 this compensation is rapid piece development. Although the line after 4...d6, challenging the e-pawn often can lead to fairly dull positions, the position remains open and Black can quickly succumb with poor defence (for example 5.Bc4 dxe5?? loses the queen to 6.Bxf7+!). After 4.bxc3 White's compensation for the doubled pawns is a big centre that can be used as a basis for a kingside attack. The resulting pawn structure leads to a position similar to that of the Winawer Variation of the French Defence.

If Black does not want to defend against White's attacking opportunities against 3...Nxc3 4.dxc3, then 3...e6 is a reasonable alternative that was Alekhine's choice when meeting the Two Knights, and this defence has been advocated by Taylor. If White plays 4.d4, then 4...Nxc3 forces White into the bxc3 line reminiscent of the French. If 4.Nxd5 exd5, Black will quickly dissolve the doubled pawns with ...d6, and the resulting position will tend to be drawish.

=== Minor sidelines after 2.e5 Nd5 ===
Steiner vs. Alekhine, 1921

Position: a8 black rook, b8 black knight, c8 black bishop, d8 black queen, e8 black king, f8 black bishop, h8 black rook, a7 black pawn, b7 black pawn, c7 black pawn, e7 black pawn, f7 black pawn, g7 black pawn, h7 black pawn, d6 black pawn, d5 black knight, e5 white pawn, g5 white bishop, d4 white pawn, a2 white pawn, b2 white pawn, c2 white pawn, f2 white pawn, g2 white pawn, h2 white pawn, a1 white rook, b1 white knight, d1 white queen, e1 white king, f1 white bishop, g1 white knight, h1 white rook

4.Bg5

In Steiner–Alekhine, Budapest 1921, the first high-level game with the Alekhine Defence, White played 3.d4 d6 4.Bg5. Cox recommends 4...h6 5.Bh4 dxe5 6.dxe5 Bf5, followed by ...Nc6 and ...Ndb4, targeting c2.

Another rare line, but one that scores well in practice is 3.d4 d6 4.Be2, preventing Black from playing 4...Bg4 while retaining the option of making the pawn advance f2–f4.

Position: a8 black rook, b8 black knight, c8 black bishop, d8 black queen, e8 black king, f8 black bishop, h8 black rook, a7 black pawn, b7 black pawn, c7 black pawn, d7 black pawn, e7 black pawn, f7 black pawn, g7 black pawn, h7 black pawn, b6 black knight, e5 white pawn, a4 white pawn, c4 white pawn, b2 white pawn, d2 white pawn, f2 white pawn, g2 white pawn, h2 white pawn, a1 white rook, b1 white knight, c1 white bishop, d1 white queen, e1 white king, f1 white bishop, g1 white knight, h1 white rook

3.c4 Nb6 4.a4

After 3.c4 Nb6 4.a4 (the Emory Tate line), White can aim at chasing the black knight away followed by a pawn sacrifice that impairs Black's development, for example by 4...d6 5.a5 N6d7 6.e6, but this leaves Black with a strong centre and an almost-winning position, though the threat of a5 still looms. Black can prevent this with 4...a5. White's main continuation is to deploy the queen rook for duties on the kingside with 5.Ra3, followed by Rg3 at some point when the attack on g7 is supposed to inhibit the development of Black's bishop to e7. However, after 5...d6 6.exd6 exd6 7.Rg3 Bf5, Black can carry through with 8...Be7 anyway, since after 9.Rxg7 the rook would be trapped and lost to 9...Bg6 and 10...Bf6. The idea for this unusual early "rook lift" probably originated with the American International Master Emory Tate. Women's World Champion GM Mariya Muzychuk, World Junior Champion GM Lu Shanglei and GM Nazar Firman have experimented with this line and achieved some success with it.

=== Alternatives to 2...Nd5 ===
After 2.e5, 2...Nd5 is almost universally played. The two other knight moves that do not hang it to the queen on d1 are 2...Ng8 and 2...Ne4.

- 2...Ng8, undeveloping the knight, was named the "Brooklyn Defence" in honour of his hometown by GM Joel Benjamin, who calls this his "pet line". Although Black might be said to be giving odds of three moves, White only has a small advantage according to theory. The first recorded use of this line was in 1905 in Vienna where Aron Nimzowitsch with white checkmated Adolf Albin on the 34th move.
- Very dubious is 2...Ne4?, which John L. Watson and Eric Schiller dub the "Mokele Mbembe". They analyse 3.d4 f6 4.Bd3 d5 5.f3 Ng5 6.Bxg5 fxg5 7.f4! g6! 8.Nf3! g4 (they also analyse 8...gxf4 9.Ng5! e6 10.Qg4! Qe7 11.0-0 and 8...Bg4 9.h3, both leading to a large advantage for White) 9.Ng5 Bh6 10.Nxh7 Rxh7 11.Bxg6+ Rf7 12.Qd3 Bf8 13.f5 e6 14.f6 Qd7 15.h3! g3 16.Qxg3, with a winning advantage for White. Nunn's Chess Openings concludes that White gets a large advantage with 3.d4 f6 (or 3...e6 4.Nh3 h6 5.Qg4 d5 6.f3 h5 7.Qf4 g5 8.Nxg5 Nxg5 9.Qxg5 Be7 10.Qg7) 4.Qh5+ g6 5.Qh4 d5 6.Bd3.

== 2.Nc3 ==
Instead of chasing Black's knight, White may defend the e4-pawn, either directly or through tactical means.

2.Nc3 is by far White's most common alternative to 2.e5; in fact Cox noted that he saw this move in over half his games with the Alekhine. It is often played by amateurs and those wishing to avoid a theoretical battle on territory more familiar to their opponents. Cox wrote that many White players are bluffing, however, and in fact know nothing about either the Vienna Game or the Four Knights Game, to which the game can easily transpose if Black plays 2...e5, citing one book which recommended 2.Nc3 while assuring readers that 2...e5 is uncommon. Another transposition Black may enter is 2...d6, which usually leads to the Pirc Defence.

The independent Alekhine line is 2...d5, known as the Scandinavian Variation. After 2...d5, 3.exd5 Nxd5 4.Bc4, 4...Nb6 or 4...Nxc3 is considered roughly equal, while 4...e6 is solid but blocks in the light-squared bishop. 4.g3 has been played by the Danish correspondence player Ove Ekebjaerg, when Harald Keilhack recommends 4...Nxc3 5.bxc3 Qd5! 6.Qf3! (6.Nf3 Qe4+ is awkward in light of 7.Be2 Bh3 or 7.Qe2 Qxc2) Qe6+! 7.Qe2 ("on 7.Be2 or 7.Ne2, 7...Bd7 is unpleasant") Qxe2+ 8.Nxe2 Bd7! 9.Bg2 Bc6 10.0-0 Bxg2 11.Kxg2 Nc6 12.d3 g6 13.Rb1 0-0-0 14.c4 Bg7, when "Black has a rather comfortable position", as in Ekebjaerg–Alcantara Soares, corr. 1989.

More combative after 2...d5 is 3.e5, when Black can choose among 3...d4, 3...Nfd7 (transposing to the Steinitz Variation of the French Defence after 4.d4 e6, but 4.e6!? is a sharp alternative), 3...Ne4!?, and even 3...Ng8. After 3...d4 can follow 4.Nce2 Ng4, or 4.exf6 dxc3 5.fxg7 cxd2+ leading to quick castling for White.

While most grandmasters play the mainline 2.e5, Jonny Hector regularly plays 2.Nc3 against the Alekhine, and has scored well against the 2...d5 variation. His ideas have left White with a theoretical edge. Textbook authors of the Alekhine Defence, including Davies, Cox, and Taylor, have therefore encouraged 2...e5 over 2...d5.

== Other 2nd moves for White ==
- 2.d3, the Maroczy Variation, is less common. Although playable, 2.d3 blocks in White's light-squared bishop, so the variation is considered somewhat passive. If White fianchettoes that bishop, transposition to a King's Indian Attack is likely. Lev Alburt and Eric Schiller call 2.d3 "insipid" and recommend 2...d5 (or 3.Nd2 e5 with a reversed Philidor's Defence) 3.e5 Nfd7 4.f4 (4.d4 c5 5.c3 Nc6 leaves Black a tempo up on the French Defence) c5 5.Nf3 e6 6.g3!? Nc6 7.Bg2 Be7 8.0-0 b5 with equality.
- 2.Qe2 e5 with an equal game.
- 2.Bc4, the Krejczik Variation, is rarely seen, since it allows Black to gain the bishop pair and seize space in the centre. Alburt and Schiller write that after 2...Nxe4 3.Bxf7+ (the Krejcik Gambit) Kxf7 4.Qh5+ Kg8 or 4...g6 5.Qd5+ e6 6.Qxe4 Bg7 7.Qf4+ Ke8! "Black has nothing to worry about." Playable alternatives include 2...e5 (transposing to the Bishop's Opening), 2...d5, and 2...e6.
- 2.Bd3 aims to transpose into a Kopec System.
- 2.c4 gambits the e4-pawn in favour of superior development after 2...Nxe4 3.Nf3. While very rare, the line has been played a few times in grandmaster play, including a transposition to the King's Indian Defence after 2...g6 3.Nc3.
- 2.f3 is also rare, but players who like to play the Black side of the Latvian Gambit can in effect wind up playing it after 1.e4 Nf6 2.f3 e5 3.f4!?.
- 2.Nf3, the John Tracy Gambit, is a poor choice, leading to the loss of the king pawn for doubtful compensation.

== ECO ==
The Encyclopaedia of Chess Openings has four codes for Alekhine's Defence, B02 through B05:

- B02: 1.e4 Nf6
- B03: 1.e4 Nf6 2.e5 Nd5 3.d4 (including the Exchange Variation and Four Pawns Attack)
- B04: 1.e4 Nf6 2.e5 Nd5 3.d4 d6 4.Nf3 (Modern Variation without 4...Bg4)
- B05: 1.e4 Nf6 2.e5 Nd5 3.d4 d6 4.Nf3 Bg4 (Modern Variation with 4...Bg4)

== See also ==
- List of chess openings
- List of chess openings named after people
