= Graham Burgess =

English chess player (born 1968)

Personal information
- Born: Graham K. Burgess; 24 February 1968 (age 58) Liverpool, England

Chess career
- Country: England
- Title: FIDE Master (1989)
- Peak rating: 2350 (January 1989)

Graham K. Burgess (born 24 February 1968 in Liverpool, England) is an English FIDE Master of chess and a noted writer and trainer. He became a FIDE Master at the age of twenty. He attended Birkdale High School in Southport, Merseyside. In 1989 he graduated from the University of Cambridge with a degree in mathematics. In 1994 he set a world record by playing 510 games of blitz chess (five minutes for each player) in three days, winning 431 games and drawing 25 (Burgess 2000:448–52).

Burgess has written more than twenty books and edited more than 250. His book The Mammoth Book of Chess won the British Chess Federation Book of the Year Award in 1997. He is the editorial director of Gambit Publications. (Burgess 2000:title page).

He is also a Doom (1993) speedrunner.

== Books ==
- Burgess, Graham (1993). The King's Indian for the Attacking Player. Batsford. ISBN 0-8050-2936-2.
- Burgess, Graham (1994). Winning with the Smith-Morra Gambit. Batsford. ISBN 0-8050-3574-5.
- Burgess, Graham (1995). Gambits. Batsford. ISBN 978-0-8050-3898-9.
- Burgess, Graham (1998). The Quickest Chess Victories of All Time. Everyman Chess. ISBN 978-1-85744-538-1.
- Burgess, Graham (1998). The Complete Alekhine. B. T. Batsford Ltd. ISBN 0-8050-2425-5.
- Nunn, John; Gallagher, Joe; Emms, John; Burgess, Graham (1999). Nunn's Chess Openings. Everyman Chess. ISBN 978-1-85744-221-2.
- Burgess, Graham (2000). The Taimanov Sicilian. Gambit Publications. ISBN 978-1901983333.
- Burgess, Graham (2000). Chess Highlights of the 20th Century. Gambit Publications. ISBN 978-1-901983-21-0.
- Burgess, Graham (2001). The Slav. Gambit. ISBN 1-901983-44-7.
- Burgess, Graham; Nunn, John; Emms, John (2004). The Mammoth Book of the World's Greatest Chess Games (2nd ed.). Carroll & Graf. ISBN 978-0-7867-1411-7.
- Burgess, Graham (2022). The Mammoth Book of Chess (4th ed.). Running Press Book Publishers. ISBN 978-1472146205. First edition (1997) also published in hardback as Chess: Tactics and Strategy, Castle Books, 2002, ISBN 978-0-7858-1516-7
