= John Cox (chess player) =

British chess player

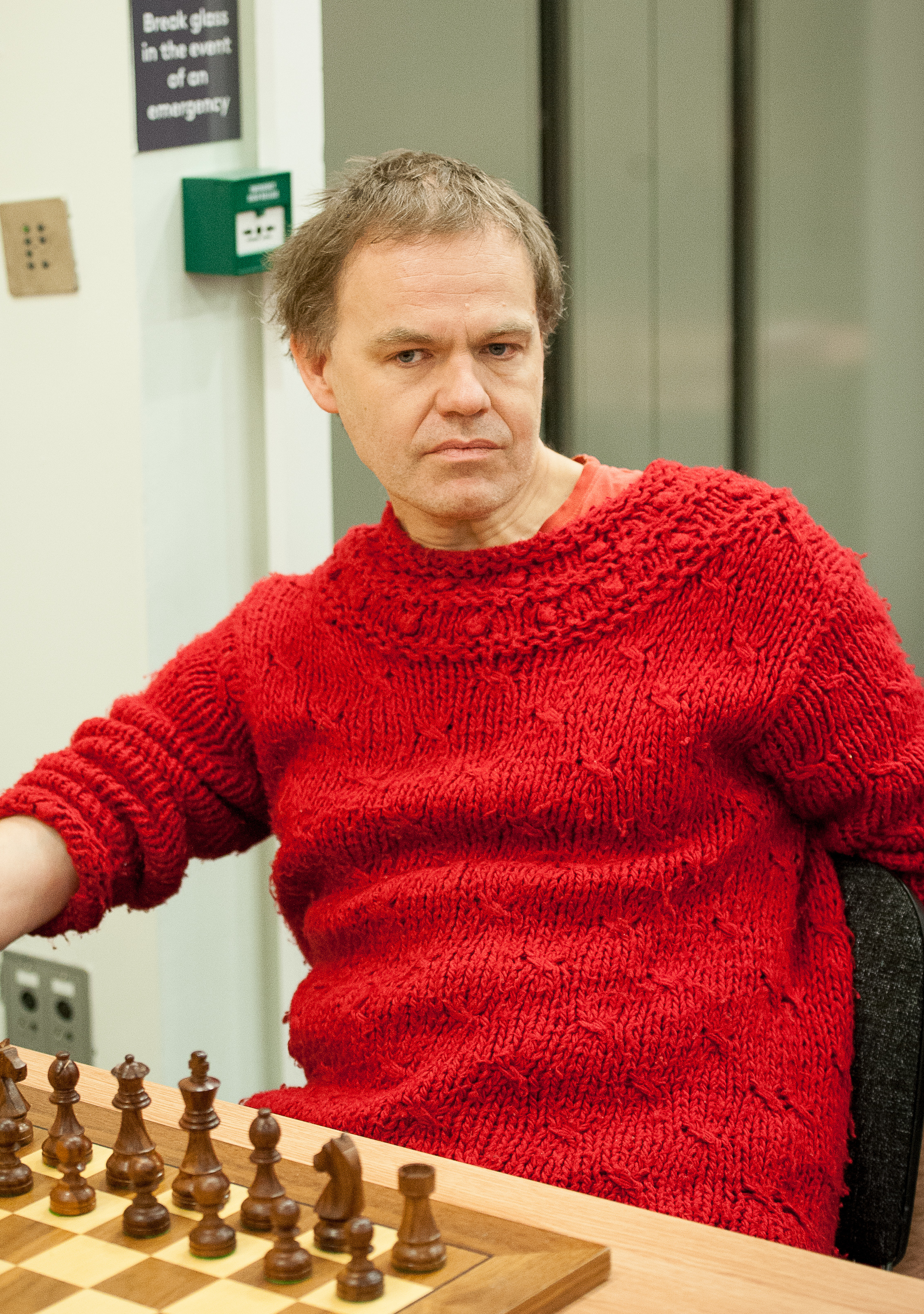
- Cox in 2016

Personal information
- Full name: John J. Cox
- Born: 22 May 1962 (age 64)

Chess career
- Country: England
- Title: International Master (2005)
- FIDE rating: 2319 (December 2021)
- Peak rating: 2423 (January 2006)

John J. Cox (born 22 May 1962) is a British chess player who holds the title of International Master which he earned in 2005. His peak Elo rating of 2423 was achieved in January 2006.

Cox was among the strong juniors in the 1970s and 1980s and finished tied for first in a British U18 championship. The need to earn a living made Cox leave the chess scene for several years. During this time he also played bridge. He eventually returned to chess after the hiatus.

== Books ==
Cox has written a number of well-received chess books, and he has contributed to the New in Chess yearbooks.

Four of his books were published by Everyman Chess, three of them introductory level books in the Starting Out series. His 2004 book on the Alekhine's Defence, Starting Out: Alekhine's Defence was credited by Watson as his main source on the Alekhine, and Carsten Hansen's review for the Chess Cafe credited the book for readability, an easy-going tone, and excellent annotations. Since the book was written, Cox has largely abandoned the Alekhine because of perceived trouble for Black in the Four Pawns Attack variation. Cox has since taken up 1.e4 e5.

A manual for Black on Queen's Pawn Game sidelines such as the Colle System and Trompowsky Attack was published in 2005 under the title Dealing with 1 d4 deviations. The idea of this book was proposed by Cox who believed there was a niche for a book on how to deal with these openings which are common at the club level.

The 2006 White opening repertoire book Starting Out: 1 d4! also received high marks in reviews by Hansen and Watson, despite some skepticism of Cox's opening selections which included highly theoretical and complex variations. Cox recommended playing main line openings and to avoid deliberately playing inferior sidelines. Watson also remarked the recommendation of such difficult lines for an amateur audience, but Cox notes that the complex main lines may well appeal to players of club level strength.

The 2007 book Starting Out: Sicilian Sveshnikov also received top marks from Hansen, who praised Cox's communication of the difficult lines which are a feature of the Sveshnikov line.

Cox's book for Quality Chess, The Berlin Wall which is about the solid Berlin Variation of the Ruy Lopez, received top marks for its writing and thoroughness.
