= Zenón Franco Ocampos =

Paraguayan chess grandmaster (1956–2024)

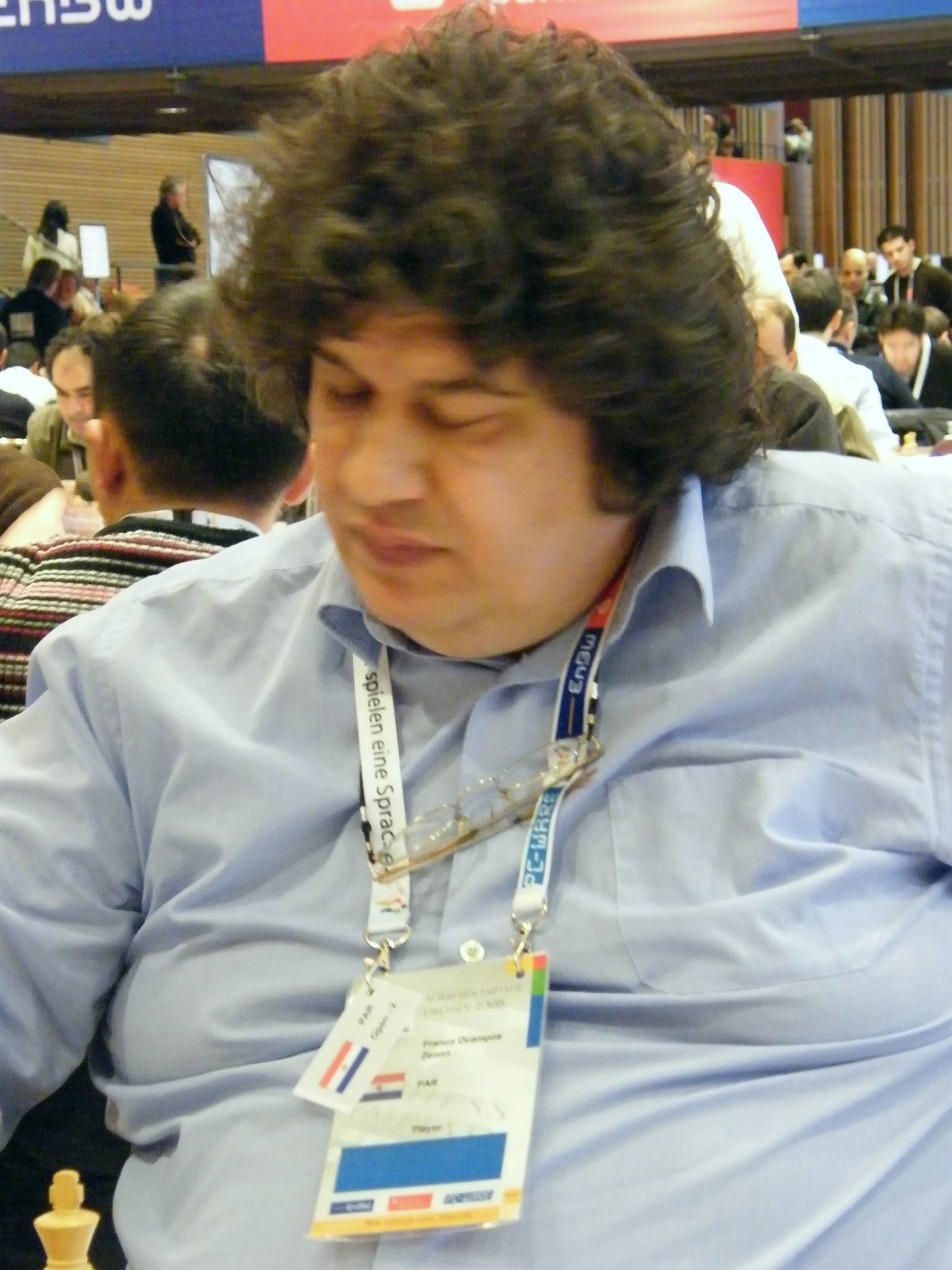
- Franco in 2008

Personal information
- Born: 12 May 1956 Asunción, Paraguay
- Died: 1 October 2024 (aged 68) Santiago de Compostela, Spain

Chess career
- Country: Paraguay
- Title: Grandmaster (1990)
- Peak rating: 2542 (July 2004)
- Peak ranking: No. 66 (January 1982)

Zenón Franco Ocampos (Latin American Spanish: [seˈnoɱ ˈfɾaŋko oˈkampos]; (Note: In isolation, Zenón is pronounced [seˈnon].) 12 May 1956 – 1 October 2024) was a Paraguayan chess grandmaster (GM). In the 1982 Chess Olympiad at Lucerne, he won the gold medal at board one by scoring 11 of 13. In the 1990 Chess Olympiad at Novi Sad, he shared first place at board one with 9 points in 12 games. As of 2007, Franco was the top-ranked player and only GM in Paraguay. He wrote several books on chess for Gambit Publications under the name Zenón Franco.

Franco died in Vigo on 1 October 2024, at the age of 68.

== Books ==
- Franco, Zenon (2005). Chess Self-Improvement. Gambit Publications. ISBN 1-904600-29-8.
- Franco, Zenon (2006). Winning Chess Explained. Gambit Publications. ISBN 1-904600-46-8.
- Franco, Zenon; Crouch, Colin (2007). How to Defend in Chess. Gambit. ISBN 978-1-904600-83-1.
- Franco, Zenon (2007). Chess Explained: The Modern Benoni. Gambit. ISBN 978-1-904600-77-0.
- Franco, Zenon (2008). The Art of Attacking Chess. Gambit Publications. ISBN 978-1-904600-97-8.
- Franco, Zenon (2009). Grandmaster Secrets: Counter-Attack!. Gambit Publications. ISBN 978-1906454098.
- Franco, Zenon (2014). Anand: Move by Move. Everyman Chess. ISBN 978-1781941867.
