= Mark Dvoretsky =

Russian chess player (1947–2016)

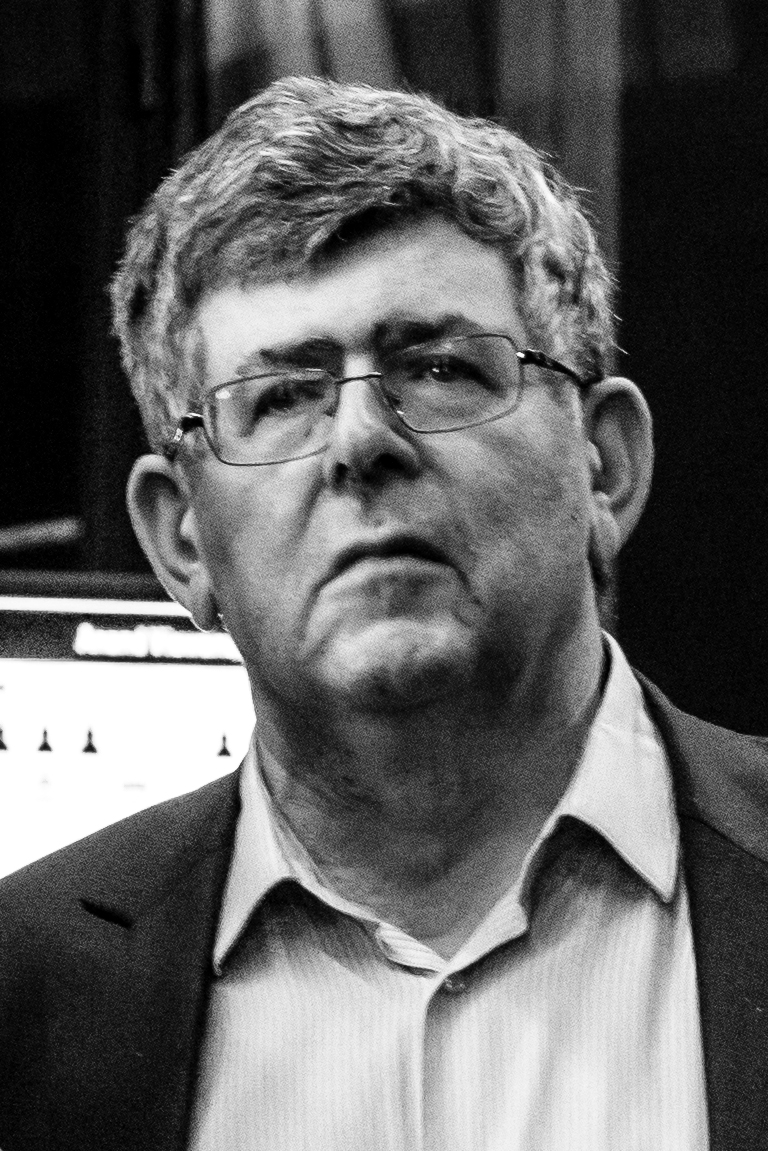

Personal information
- Born: December 9, 1947 Moscow, Soviet Union
- Died: September 26, 2016 (aged 68) Moscow, Russia

Chess career
- Country: Russia
- Title: International Master (1975)
- Years active: 1966–1997
- Peak rating: 2540 (January 1976)
- Peak ranking: No. 37 (January 1976)

Mark Izrailevich Dvoretsky (Russian: Марк Изра́илевич Дворе́цкий; December 9, 1947 – September 26, 2016) was a Russian chess trainer, writer, and International Master.

== Biography ==
Dvoretsky was born in Moscow in 1947. He learnt chess when he was around 5 or 6 years old. However, he started to study chess seriously and participate in tournaments only when he was in the fifth grade. Before that he had a different interest – mathematics. One day his math teacher was changed, and he found the new teacher boring. He subsequently lost his interest in math and moved towards chess. He was 11–12 years old when he enrolled in a chess club in Moscow. He was awarded the International Master title in 1975, and for a time he was widely regarded as the strongest IM in the world. This was due to a number of excellent results: he was Moscow Champion in 1973, finished equal fifth in a strong Soviet Championship in 1974, and won the Wijk aan Zee B group tournament of 1975 by a clear point and a half. Along with another creditable finish at the USSR Championship of 1975, the results were an indication that he was already of grandmaster strength.

However, for personal reasons he opted not to remain an active player and instead followed his urge to become a chess trainer. This was something he had tried out and enjoyed while studying at Moscow University, and he quickly gained a reputation for transforming serious, hard-working 2200 rated players into grandmasters. Similarly, it was said that established grandmasters could become champions under his tutelage, and his student register soon incorporated many of the chess greats. Garry Kasparov, Viswanathan Anand, Veselin Topalov, Evgeny Bareev, Joël Lautier and Loek van Wely are among the players who benefited from his coaching. Aleksey Dreev, Nana Alexandria, Viorel Bologan, Ernesto Inarkiev, Alexander Motylev were some of his other great students. Valery Chekhov, Artur Yusupov, Sergei Dolmatov and Maxim Dlugy went on to become Junior World Champions after receiving training from him.

Equally noteworthy has been his long-time collaboration with fellow Muscovite Artur Yusupov. Yusupov attributes much of his chess success to Dvoretsky's training methods and at his peak became number three in the world (behind Kasparov and Karpov) and reached the semi-final of the World Championship Candidates Tournament on no fewer than three occasions. They have published books together and even established a chess school in the 1990s, turning out many of today's top-flight grandmasters. Dvoretsky and Yusupov's students have included Peter Svidler, Sergei Movsesian, Alexey Alexandrov, Vasily Yemelin, Inna Gaponenko, Ilakha Kadymova, Ela Pitem, Vadim Zviagintsev, Vladimir Baklan, and Peter Kiriakov.

Dvoretsky wrote a series of chess training books. The series commenced with Secrets of Chess Training which won the BCF book of the year award in 1991. Secrets of Chess Tactics, Opening Preparation, Technique for the Tournament Player, Positional Play and Attack and Defence followed (the latter four co-authored with Artur Yusupov). These were reissued by Edition Olms, a Swiss publishing house as the 'School of Future Champions' series. His 'School of Chess Excellence' books, Endgame Analysis, Tactical Play, Strategic Play and Opening Developments, followed and in 2003 Dvoretsky's Endgame Manual was released, which is highly regarded by leading professional players. He died on September 26, 2016, at the age of 68. He said in an interview in March 2016 he had been battling cancer for several years.

== Books ==
=== Original series ===
The Dvoretsky School series was first published in English in these editions:

- Mark Dvoretsky (1991). Secrets of Chess Training. B T Batsford Ltd, London. ISBN 0-7134-6287-6.
- Mark Dvoretsky (1992). Secrets of Chess Tactics. B T Batsford Ltd, London.
- Mark Dvoretsky and Artur Yusupov (1993). Training for the Tournament Player. B T Batsford Ltd, London. ISBN 0-7134-7238-3.
- Mark Dvoretsky and Artur Yusupov (1994). Opening Preparation. B T Batsford Ltd, London. ISBN 0-7134-7509-9.
- Mark Dvoretsky and Artur Yusupov (c. 1995). Technique for the Tournament Player. B T Batsford Ltd, London. ISBN 0-7134-7722-9.
- Mark Dvoretsky and Artur Yusupov (1996). Positional Play. B T Batsford Ltd, London. ISBN 0-7134-7879-9.
- Mark Dvoretsky and Artur Yusupov (1998). Attack and Defence: how creative thought develops in a chessplayer. B T Batsford Ltd, London. ISBN 0-7134-8214-1.

=== Reprints and further works ===
- Mark Dvoretsky. School of Chess Excellence 1: Endgame Analysis. Olms. ISBN 978-3-283-00416-3.
- Mark Dvoretsky. School of Chess Excellence 2: Tactical Play. Olms. ISBN 978-3-283-00417-0.
- Mark Dvoretsky. School of Chess Excellence 3: Strategic Play. Olms. ISBN 978-3-283-00418-7.
- Mark Dvoretsky. School of Chess Excellence 4: Opening Developments. Olms. ISBN 978-3-283-00419-4.
- Mark Dvoretsky; Artur Yusupov. Secrets of Chess Training: School of Future Champions 1. Olms. ISBN 978-3-283-00515-3.
- Mark Dvoretsky; Artur Yusupov. Secrets of Opening Preparation: School of Future Champions 2. Olms. ISBN 978-3-283-00516-0.
- Mark Dvoretsky; Artur Yusupov. Secrets of Endgame Technique: School of Future Champions 3. Olms. ISBN 978-3-283-00517-7.
- Mark Dvoretsky; Artur Yusupov. Secrets of Positional Play: School of Future Champions 4. Olms. ISBN 978-3-283-00518-4.
- Mark Dvoretsky; Artur Yusupov. Secrets of Creative Thinking: School of Future Champions 5. Olms. ISBN 978-3-283-00519-1.
- Mark Dvoretsky (2003). Dvoretsky's Endgame Manual (2020 ed.). Russell Enterprises. ISBN 978-1-949859188.
- Mark Dvoretsky (2008). Dvoretsky's Analytical Manual. Russell Enterprises. ISBN 9781888690477.
- Mark Dvoretsky; Pervakov, Oleg (2009). Studies for Practical Players. Russell Enterprises. ISBN 978-1-888690-64-4.
- Mark Dvoretsky (2011). Tragicomedy in the Endgame. Russell Enterprises. ISBN 978-1936490042.
- Mark Dvoretsky (2014). For Friends and Colleagues Volume I - Profession: Chess Coach. Russell Enterprises. ISBN 978-1941270028.
- Mark Dvoretsky (2015). For Friends and Colleagues Volume II - Reflections on My Profession. Russell Enterprises. ISBN 978-1941270035.
- Mark Dvoretsky (2015). Recognizing your Opponents Resources. Russell Enterprises. ISBN 978-1941270004.
- Mark Dvoretsky (2016). Maneuvering: The Art of Piece Play. Russell Enterprises. ISBN 978-1941270370.
- Mark Dvoretsky (2018). Chess Lessons: Solving Problems & Avoiding Mistakes. Russell Enterprises. ISBN 978-1941270707.
- Mark Dvoretsky (2019). Chess Tests. Russell Enterprises. ISBN 978-1949859065.

== Notable games ==
- Mark Izrailovich Dvoretsky vs Boris Gulko, Leningrad URS ch 1974, English Opening: Anglo-Indian Defense, Anglo-Grünfeld Variation (A16), 1-0
- David Bronstein vs Mark Izrailovich Dvoretsky, Ch URS ( 1 liga ) 1974, French Defense: Steinitz Variation (C11), 0-1
- Attila Schneider vs Mark Izrailovich Dvoretsky, Frunze 1983, Semi-Slav Defense: Botvinnik System (D44), 0-1
- Mark Izrailovich Dvoretsky vs Vasily Smyslov, Odessa 1974, Spanish Game: Exchange (C69), 1-0

== Sources ==
- Hooper, David; Whyld, Kenneth (1984). The Oxford Companion To Chess. Oxford University. ISBN 0-19-217540-8.
- Cafferty, Bernard; Taimanov, Mark (1998). The Soviet Championships. Cadogan Chess. ISBN 1-85744-201-6.
- Chess Magazine - May 2006.
