= James Eade =

American chess player (born 1957)

Personal information
- Born: March 23, 1957 (age 69)

Chess career
- Country: United States
- Title: FIDE Master (1993)
- Peak rating: 2340 (January 1995)

James V. Eade (born March 23, 1957) is an American chess master, chess administrator, chess tournament organizer, and chess book publisher. He holds the title of FIDE Master. He is best known for the books Chess for Dummies (1996) and The Chess Player's Bible (2004), both of which have been through multiple editions and been translated into seven languages.

He became involved in organizing chess tournaments in the 1990s. He organized the 1995 Pan Pacific International Chess Tournament, the strongest chess tournament ever held in San Francisco, won by Viktor Korchnoi, and the 1996 Hall of Fame tournament, won by Lubomir Kavalek. He also founded Hypermodern Press, a chess publishing company which produced a handful of well-received titles before ceasing operations in 1999.

He was a member of the Policy Board of the United States Chess Federation (USCF) from 1996 to 1999. He has served as American Zone President of FIDE, the World Chess Federation, from 2000 to 2002, and was a Trustee of the U. S. Chess Trust from 2000 to 2019, as well as a past President. He is also a past President of CalChess (the Northern California Chess Association), The Kolty Chess for Youth Foundation (a 501(c)-3 charity), and the Chess Journalists of America, as well as a former chairman of the chess advisory board for UT-Dallas. He is a former editor and publisher of both the CalChess Journal and the Golden Gate Chess News, and was awarded chess educator of the year for 2016 by UT-Dallas. In 2018, the USCF recognized Eade with the award for Outstanding Career Achievement. In 2019, he started the Eade Foundation (a 501(c)-3 foundation), where he is chairman and CEO. Its web site won Best Chess Website award for 2021 from the Chess Journalists of America. In 2022, he was awarded the Marquis Who's Who Humanitarian Award and was also recognized by Marquis Who's Who Top Executives for dedication, achievements, and leadership in promoting the game of chess. Marquis Who's Who also named Eade a Distinguished Leader for 2023. Eade won the 2023 Chess Journalists Award for "Best Online Interview", and was named "2025 Top Author of the Year" by the IAOTP. He also hosts the show "Change Your Mind" on Podcast TV.

He lives in Menlo Park, California, where he continues to teach and write about chess.

== Books ==
=== Books written by James Eade ===
- James Eade (1991). Remember the MacCutcheon!. Chess Enterprises. ISBN 978-0-945470-10-6.
- James Eade; Nick de Firmian (1996). San Francisco 1995. Hypermodern Press. ISBN 978-1-886040-19-9.
- James Eade (1996). Chess for Dummies. Wiley. ISBN 978-0-7645-5003-4.
- James Eade (2004). The Chess Player's Bible : Illustrated Strategies for Staying Ahead of the Game. Barron's Educational Series. ISBN 978-0-7641-5787-5.
- James Eade (2010). Chess Openings for Dummies. Wiley. ISBN 978-0-470-60364-2.
- James Eade (2023). Freedom. Wiley. ISBN 978-1-958211-32-8.
- James Eade (2025). No Blame No Shame.

=== Books published by James Eade and his Hypermodern Press ===
- Modern Chess Brilliancies (Great Literature Series) by Larry Evans ISBN 1-886040-11-7
- The Chess of Bobby Fischer (Great Literature Series) by Robert E. Burger ISBN 1-886040-12-5
- The Bobby Fischer I Knew & Other Stories by Arnold Denker and Larry Parr ISBN 1-886040-18-4
- The Unconventional King's Indian defense (Competitive Chess Series) by John L. Watson ISBN 1-886040-10-9
- The Big Book of Combinations Eric Schiller 1995 ISBN 1-886040-14-1
- The Big Book of Busts John Watson & Eric Schiller 1995 ISBN 1-886040-13-3
