= Vereslav Eingorn =

Ukrainian chess grandmaster (1956–2026)

Personal information
- Born: 23 November 1956 Odesa, Ukrainian SSR, Soviet Union
- Died: 18 August 2026 (aged 69)

Chess career
- Country: Ukraine
- Title: Grandmaster (1986)
- Peak rating: 2611 (July 2003)
- Peak ranking: No. 26 (July 1986)

Viacheslav (Vereslav) Semenovych Eingorn (Ukrainian: В'ячеслав (Вереслав) Семенович Ейнгорн; 23 November 1956 – 18 August 2026) was a Ukrainian chess grandmaster, coach and author. He was a member of the gold medal-winning Ukrainian team at the 2001 World Team Chess Championship.

== Chess career ==
Born into a Jewish family in Odesa, he twice won the city championship (1977 and 1979). Eingorn played in several USSR Chess Championships, with his best result third place, behind Andrei Sokolov and Konstantin Lerner at Lviv in 1984. In 1986, he placed equal first with Sergey Smagin and Joseph Gallagher in the 2nd Cappelle-la-Grande open. He played for Ukraine in the Chess Olympiads of 1992, 2000 (bronze medal) and 2002. In 1987 he played in the Interzonal tournament at Zagreb, though failed to qualify for the Candidates Matches. He took part in the FIDE World Chess Championship 2002, but was knocked out in the first round by Krishnan Sasikiran.

His other tournament results include wins at Minsk 1983, Bor 1986 and Moscow 1986.

== Chess strength ==
According to Chessmetrics, at his peak in May 1986 Eingorn's play was equivalent to a rating of 2713, and he was ranked number 12 in the world. His best single performance was at Minsk (URS Championship), 1987, where he scored 10.5 of 17 possible points (62%) against 2679-rated opposition, for a performance rating of 2745.

In the July 2009 FIDE list, he has an Elo rating of 2560, making him Ukraine's number 29.

== Coach ==
Eingorn coached the Ukrainian Women's team to a gold medal in the 37th Chess Olympiad.

In 2007 he was awarded the title of FIDE Senior Trainer.

== Death ==
Eingorn died on 18 August 2026, at the age of 69.

== Notable games ==
- Vereslav Eingorn vs Yaacov Zilberman, Oberwart op 1994, Wade Defense: General (A41), 1-0
- Vereslav Eingorn vs Anatoli Karpov, URS-ch 1988, Queen's Gambit Declined: Three Knights Variation (D37), 1/2-1/2
- Efim Geller vs Vereslav Eingorn, Riga ch-SU 1985, Spanish Game: Closed Variations (C92), 0-1
- Vereslav Eingorn vs Viktor Kupreichik, Minsk 1987, Queen's Gambit Declined: Ragozin Defense (D38), 1-0
- Vereslav Eingorn vs David Bronstein, Ch URS (select) 1978, Tarrasch Defense: Swedish Variation (D33), 1-0

== Books ==
- Eingorn, Viacheslav (2003). Decision-Making at the Chessboard. Gambit Publications. ISBN 1-901983-87-0.
- Eingorn, Viacheslav (2006). Creative Chess Opening Preparation. Gambit Publications. ISBN 1-904600-58-1.
- Eingorn, Viacheslav (2008). Chess Explained: The French. Gambit Publications. ISBN 978-1-904600-95-4.
