= John Emms (chess player) =

English chess grandmaster (born 1967)

- John Emms (2001)

Personal information
- Born: John Michael Emms; 14 March 1967 (age 59)

Chess career
- Country: England
- Title: Grandmaster (1995)
- FIDE rating: 2428 (October 2026)
- Peak rating: 2586 (July 1999)

John Michael Emms (born 14 March 1967) is an English chess Grandmaster and chess author. He tied for first in the 1997 British Championship.

== Chess career ==
Born in 1967, Emms learned to play chess at the age of five or six. He finished joint first in the Politiken Cup in 1992 and 1993, and was awarded his grandmaster title in 1995. He tied for first place in the 1997 British Chess Championship, but lost out on the title in the play-off round.

He was the 2002 captain of the English Olympiad team. In October 2004, he also coached a woman's team in the 36th Chess Olympiad in Calvià, Mallorca.

== Books ==
- Emms, John (1998), Easy Guide to the Nimzo-Indian, Everyman Chess, ISBN 1-85744-513-9
- Emms, John (1998), The French Tarrasch, Batsford, ISBN 0-7134-8461-6
- Emms, John (1999), Easy Guide to the Ruy Lopez, Everyman Chess, ISBN 1-85744-220-2
- Nunn, John; Gallagher, Joe; Emms, John; Burgess, Graham (1999), Nunn's Chess Openings, Everyman Chess, ISBN 1-85744-221-0
- Emms, John (1999), The Survival Guide to Rook Endings, Everyman Chess, ISBN 1-85744-235-0 Reissued by Gambit in 2008, ISBN 978-1-904600-94-7
- Emms, John (2000), The Ultimate Chess Puzzle Book, Gambit Publications, ISBN 1-901983-34-X
- Emms, John (2000), Most Amazing Chess Moves of All Time, Gambit Publications, ISBN 1-901983-29-3
- Emms, John (2000), Play The Open Games As Black, Gambit Publications, ISBN 1-901983-27-7
- Emms, John (2001), Simple Chess, Everyman Chess, ISBN 1-85744-238-5
- Emms, John (2002), Sicilian Kan, Everyman Chess, ISBN 1-85744-302-0
- Emms, John (2002), Starting Out: The Sicilian, Everyman Chess, ISBN 1-85744-249-0
- Emms, John (2003), Play the Najdorf: Scheveningen Style, Everyman Chess, ISBN 1-85744-323-3
- Emms, John (2003), Concise Chess, Everyman Chess, ISBN 1-85744-327-6
- Burgess, Graham; Nunn, John; Emms, John (2004), The Mammoth Book of the World's Greatest Chess Games (second ed.), Carroll & Graf, ISBN 0-7867-1411-5
- Emms, John (2004), More Simple Chess: Moving on from the Basic Principles, Everyman Chess, ISBN 1-85744-343-8
- Emms, John (2004), Attacking with 1e4, Everyman Chess, ISBN 1-85744-267-9
- Emms, John (2004), Starting Out: The Queen's Indian, Everyman Chess, ISBN 1-85744-363-2
- Emms, John (2004), The Scandinavian (2nd edition), Everyman Chess, ISBN 1-85744-375-6
- Emms, John (2004), Starting Out: Minor Piece Endgames, Everyman Chess, ISBN 1-85744-359-4
- Emms, John (2005), Starting Out: King's Indian Attack, Everyman Chess, ISBN 1-85744-394-2
- Emms, John (2005), Starting Out: The Scotch Game, Everyman Chess, ISBN 1-85744-387-X
- Emms, John (2006), The Survival Guide to Competitive Chess, Everyman Chess, ISBN 1-85744-412-4
- Emms, John (2006), Discovering Chess Openings : Building a repertoire from basic principles, Everyman Chess, ISBN 1-85744-419-1
- Emms, John (2006), Dangerous Weapons: The Sicilian, Everyman Chess, ISBN 1-85744-423-X
- Emms, John (2006), Dangerous Weapons: The Nimzo-Indian, Everyman Chess, ISBN 1-85744-424-8
- Emms, John (2007), Eröffnungsreihe STARTING OUT Sizilianische Geheimnisse, Everyman Chess
- Emms, John (2007), The Survival Guide to Competitive Chess : Improve Your Results Now!, Everyman Chess, ISBN 978-1-85744-412-4
- Emms, John (2007), Eröffnungsreihe STARTING OUT Geheimnisse des königsindischen Angriffs, Everyman Chess
- Wells, Peter; Emms, John; Palliser, Richard (2009). Dangerous Weapons: Anti-Sicilians. Everyman. ISBN 978-1857445855.
- Emms, John (2011). the Nimzo-Indian move by move. Everyman Chess. ISBN 978-1-85744-666-1.
- Emms, John (2018). First Steps: 1e4e5. Everyman Chess. ISBN 978-1781944134.
