= John W. Donaldson =

United States Army general (1924–2008)

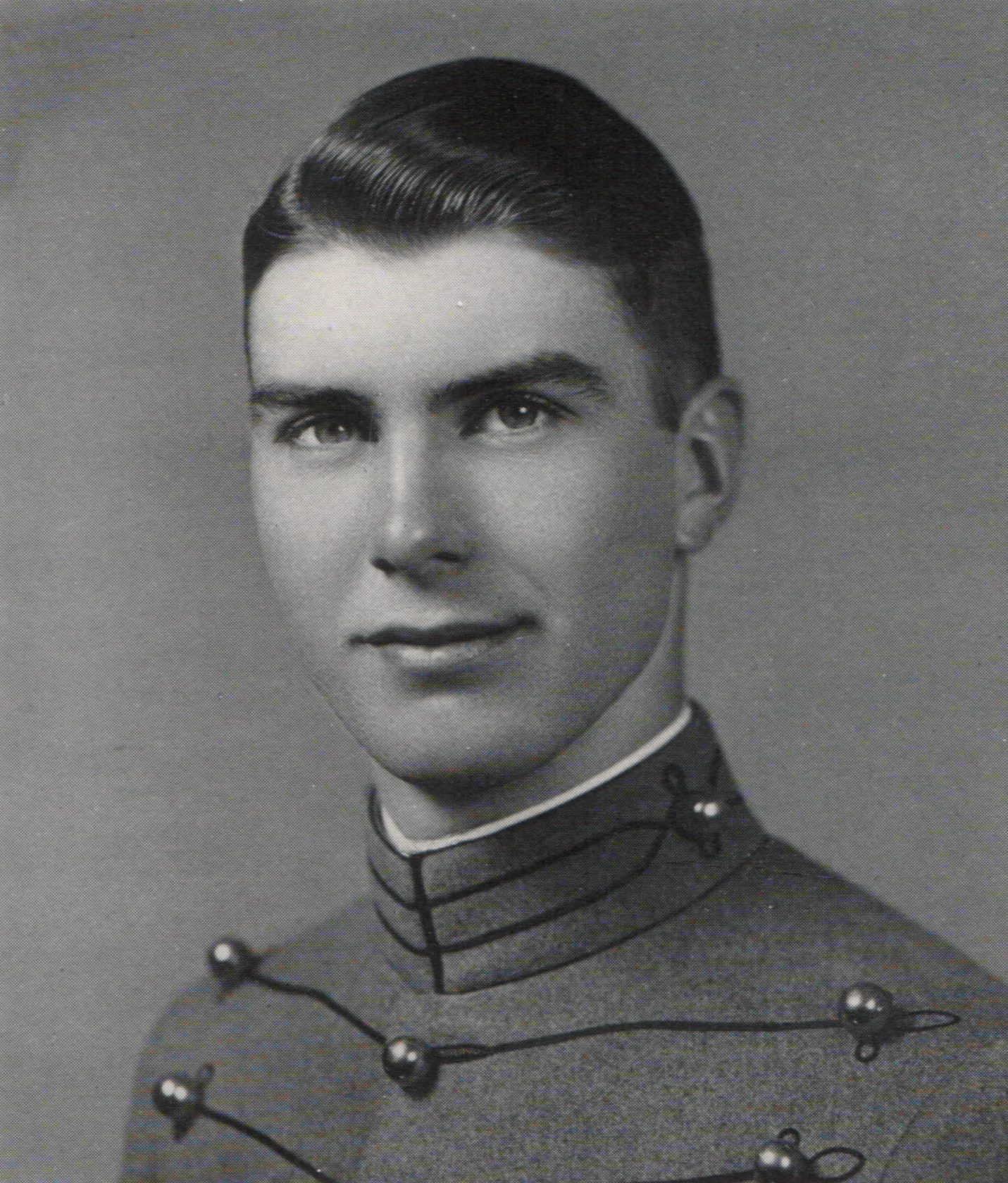
- Donaldson as a United States Military Academy cadet c. 1944
- Born: February 7, 1924
- Died: August 13, 2008 (aged 84)
- Relatives: John Owen Donaldson (uncle)
- Military career
- Allegiance: United States of America
- Branch: United States Army
- Rank: Brigadier General
- Commands: 11th Infantry Brigade, 23rd Infantry Division
- Conflicts: World War II; Korean War; Vietnam War

John Willson Donaldson (1924–2008) was a brigadier general in the United States Army. A West Point graduate, he served in World War II, the Korean War and the Vietnam War.

In the wake of the My Lai massacre conducted by units under the 11th Infantry Brigade that he commanded, Donaldson was criticized by several subordinates privately, including a letter sent by a Specialist Tom Glenn in November 1968 to William Westmoreland alleging that routine war crimes were standard operating procedures under Donaldson.

On 2 June 1971, Donaldson was charged with the murder of six South Vietnamese civilians during operations in November 1968-January 1969 while conducting aerial reconnaissance in Quảng Ngãi Province. A colonel at the time of the alleged crimes, he was the first U.S. general charged with war crimes since General Jacob H. Smith in 1902 and the highest ranking American to be accused of war crimes during the Vietnam War. Helicopter pilots had alleged that Donaldson routinely fired upon civilians. According to a senior Army investigator for the Donaldson case, "they [Colonel Donaldson] used to bet in the morning how many people they could kill – old people, civilians, it didn’t matter," the investigator said. "Some of the stuff would curl your hair." The charges against Donaldson were dropped for lack of evidence.

Donaldson later retired from the Army in good standing and died on August 13, 2008, at the age of 84.
