= Angus Dunnington =

British chess player (born 1967)

Personal information
- Born: 9 August 1967 (age 59)

Chess career
- Country: England (until 2022); Scotland (since 2022)
- Title: International Master (1989)
- Peak rating: 2450 (January 1996)

Angus J. Dunnington (born 9 August 1967) is an English poker and online gambling specialist and chess player with the title of International Master (IM). Dunnington is most known for his extensive work in chess opening theory, as well as the psychological aspects of both chess and poker. He stopped playing competitive chess in 2003 in order to spend more time writing, has been a recipient of a Chess Journalists of America award, penned over 1,000 articles and is the author of over 20 books, subjects including chess psychology, unorthodox chess openings and online gambling.

== Notable games ==
- This game was played in Scarborough, England in 1999 between Charles Storey and Angus Dunnington. Dunnington played Black in a Caro-Kann Defense, Advance Variation:

1.e4 c6 2.d4 d5 3.e5 c5 4.c3 Nc6 5.Be3 Bf5 6.Nf3 Qb6 7.Qd2 e6 8.dxc5 Bxc5 9.Bxc5 Qxc5 10.b4 Qb6 11.Na3 Nge7 12.Nb5 0-0 13.Nbd4 Be4 14.b5 Nxd4 15.Nxd4 f6 16.exf6 Rxf6 17.f3 Bg6 18.a4 e5 19.a5 Qd6 20.Nb3 e4 21.Be2 exf3 22.Bxf3 Qe5+ 23.Kf2 Be4 24.Qd4 Qf4 25.Ra4 Qh4+ 26.Ke2 Rf4 27.Kd2 Nf5 28.Qg1 Qh6 29.Ke1 Bxf3 30.Rxf4 Re8+ 31.Kf2 Qxf4 32.gxf3 Qh4+ 0–1

- This game, between Nielsen J Fischer and Angus Dunnington, was played at the 1990 Groningen Open. Dunnington played Black:

1.d4 d6 2.c4 e5 3.Nf3 e4 4.Nfd2 f5 5.Nc3 Nf6 6.e3 c6 7.d5 c5 8.b3 g6 9.Bb2 Bg7 10.Ne2 0-0 11.h4 Nxd5 12.Bxg7 Nb4 13.Nf4 Kxg7 14.Qc1 Qf6 15.a3 Nc2+ 16.Qxc2 Qxa1+ 17.Nb1 Nc6 18.Be2 Qe5 19.Nc3 Be6 20.0-0 Bf7 21.Rd1 Nd4 22.exd4 cxd4 23.Ncd5 Bxd5 24.Nxd5 d3 25.Bxd3 exd3 26.Qxd3 Rae8 27.f4 Qe2 28.Qc3+ Kh6 29.Rf1 Re4 30.Qb4 Rf7 31.Qxd6 Rd4 32.Qd8 Rd1 33.Rxd1 Qxd1+ 34.Kh2 Qxb3 35.h5 Qxa3 36.hxg6 hxg6 37.Qh8+ Rh7 38.Qe5 Qc5 39.Qc3 Qd6 40.g3 Rf7 41.Qh8+ Rh7 42.Qc3 b5 43.Nf6 Rf7 44.Nd5 bxc4 45.Qxc4 Rh7 46.Kg2 Rd7 47.Ne3 Qd2+ 48.Kf3 Rd3 49.Qc5 Qd1+ 0–1

== Publications ==
Dunnington is most recognized for his many publications on chess opening theory.

- Winning Unorthodox Openings, Everyman Chess, 2000, ISBN 978-1-85744-285-4
- Chess Psychology, Everyman Chess, 2003, ISBN 978-1-85744-326-4
- Blunders and how to avoid them, Everyman Chess, 2004, ISBN 978-1-85744-344-8
- Pawn Power, Batsford Chess Library, 1994

== See also ==
- Durkin Opening
