= Todd Bardwick =

American author, chess teacher, and US National Chess Master

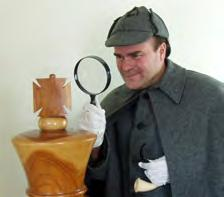

Personal information
- Born: 1963 (age 61–62)

Todd Bardwick (born 1963) is an American author, chess teacher, US National Chess Master and US National Tournament Director from Denver, Colorado. He was recognized by the United States Chess Federation with the highest lifetime title for a chess teacher, Professional Chess Coach (Level V), for his lifetime work running the Rocky Mountain Chess Camp through the Denver Chess Academy continuously since 1995.

Bardwick won the 2023 Dan Heisman Award for Excellence in Chess Instruction from the United States Chess Federation and is a member of the Colorado Chess Hall of Fame.

Bardwick played in the longest continuous chess game(a 12 hour, 143 move draw) between masters in the history of the United States against FIDE Master David Lucky in the 4th Round of the 1995 Colorado Open on September 3-4.

== Publications ==
- From 2002 to 2017, Bardwick wrote “The Chess Detective” column in Chess Life for Kids, the national chess magazine for children published by the United States Chess Federation.
- From 1993 until the newspaper's closing in 2009, Bardwick wrote the monthly chess column for the Rocky Mountain News featuring interviews with famous sports stars, chess in the movies, and local, national, and world chess news.

== Books ==
- Teaching Chess in the 21st Century. A training guide for school teachers and chess club sponsors, incorporating standards developed by the National Council of Teachers of Mathematics. Chess Detective Press, 2004. ISBN 978-0-9761962-0-4
- Chess Workbook for Children (2006). A children's introduction to chess which parallels the chapters of Teaching Chess in the 21st Century. The workbook has been translated and sold in Russia, Korea, and the Czech Republic. Chess Detective Press, 2006. ISBN 978-0-9761962-1-1
- Chess Strategy Workbook (2010). It was also translated and sold in Russia. Chess Detective Press, 2010. ISBN 978-0-9761962-2-8
- Chess Tactics and Combinations Workbook. Chess Detective Press, 2019. ISBN 978-0-9761962-3-5
- Attacking the Chess King Workbook. Chess Detective Press, 2019. ISBN 978-0-9761962-4-2
- Chess Concepts and Coloring Book for Kids. Chess Detective Press, 2019. ISBN 978-0-9761962-5-9
- Chess Handbook. Chess Detective Press, 2020. ISBN 978-0-9761962-6-6
- Chess Endgame Workbook. Chess Detective Press, 2021. ISBN 978-0-9761962-7-3
- Chess Openings. Chess Detective Press, 2022. ISBN 978-0-9761962-8-0
