= Nigel Davies (chess player) =

British chess grandmaster (born 1960)

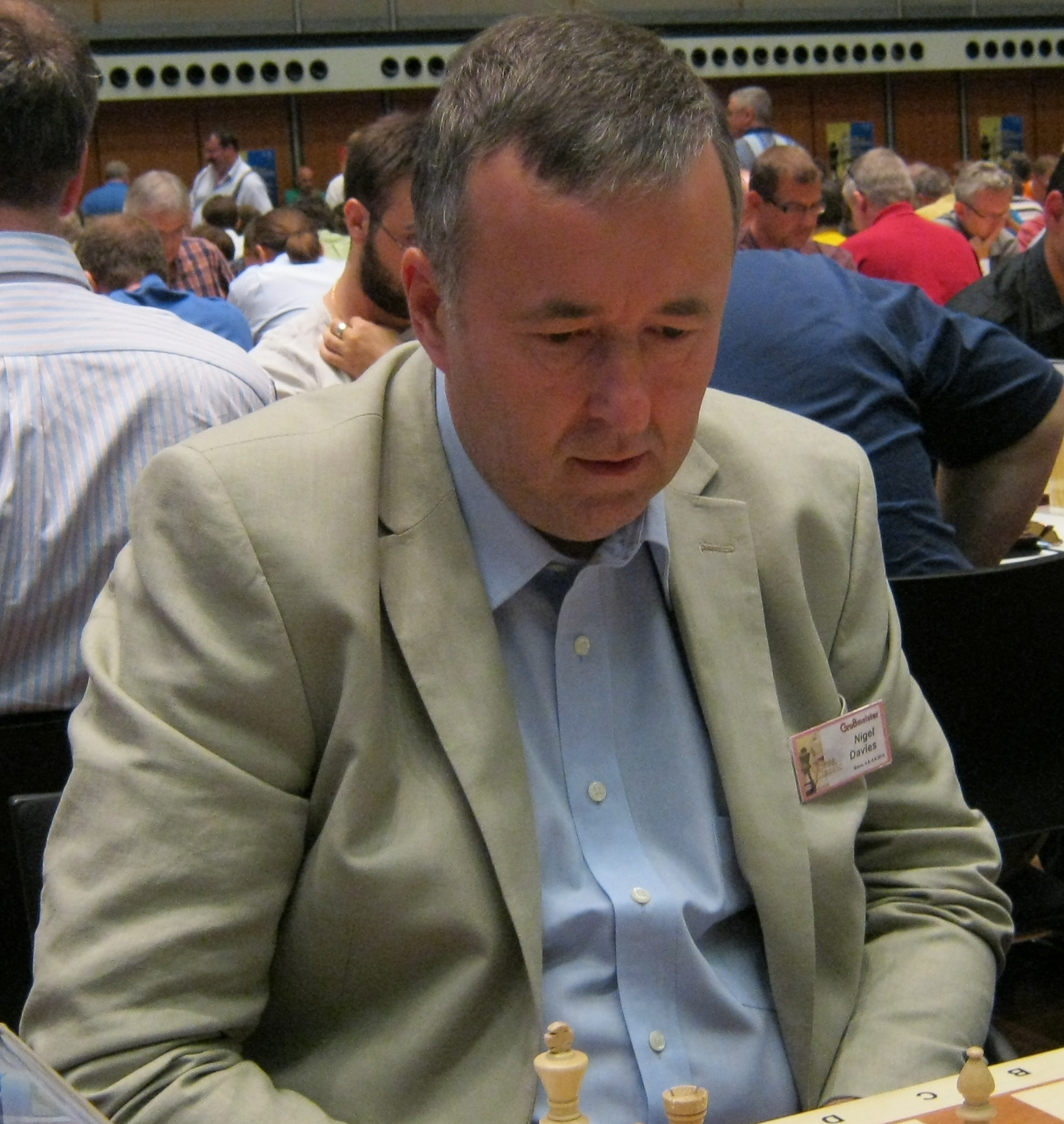

Personal information
- Born: Nigel Rodney Davies; 31 July 1960 (age 66) Southport, England

Chess career
- Country: England (until 2015; since 2022); Wales (2015–2022)
- Title: Grandmaster (1993)
- Peak rating: 2530 (January 1995)

Nigel Davies (born 31 July 1960) is an English chess Grandmaster, chess coach and writer.

Davies won the British (Under-21) Boys Championship in 1979 and the British Rapidplay Chess Championship in 1987.

In July 2015 Davies transferred his FIDE registration from England to Wales and became eligible to represent them internationally, he transferred back to England in 2022.

== Books ==
- Davies, Nigel (1998). The Chess Player's Battle Manual. Batsford. ISBN 0-7134-7043-7.
- Davies, Nigel (1998). The Power Chess Program. Batsford. ISBN 0-7134-8415-2.
- Davies, Nigel (2002). The Grünfeld Defence. Everyman Chess. ISBN 1-85744-239-3.
- Davies, Nigel (2003). The Veresov. Everyman Chess. ISBN 9781857443356.
- Davies, Nigel (2004). The Dynamic Reti. Everyman Chess. ISBN 9781857443523.
- Davies, Nigel (2005). The Trompowsky. Everyman Chess. ISBN 1857443764.
- Davies, Nigel (2008). King's Indian Attack. Hamburg: ChessBase. ISBN 978-3-86681-071-6.
- Davies, Nigel (2008). Starting Out: The Modern. Everyman Chess. ISBN 9781857445664.
- Davies, Nigel (2009). Play the Catalan. Gloucester Publishers plc (formerly Everyman Publishers plc). ISBN 9781857445916.
