= András Adorján =

Hungarian chess grandmaster (1950–2023)

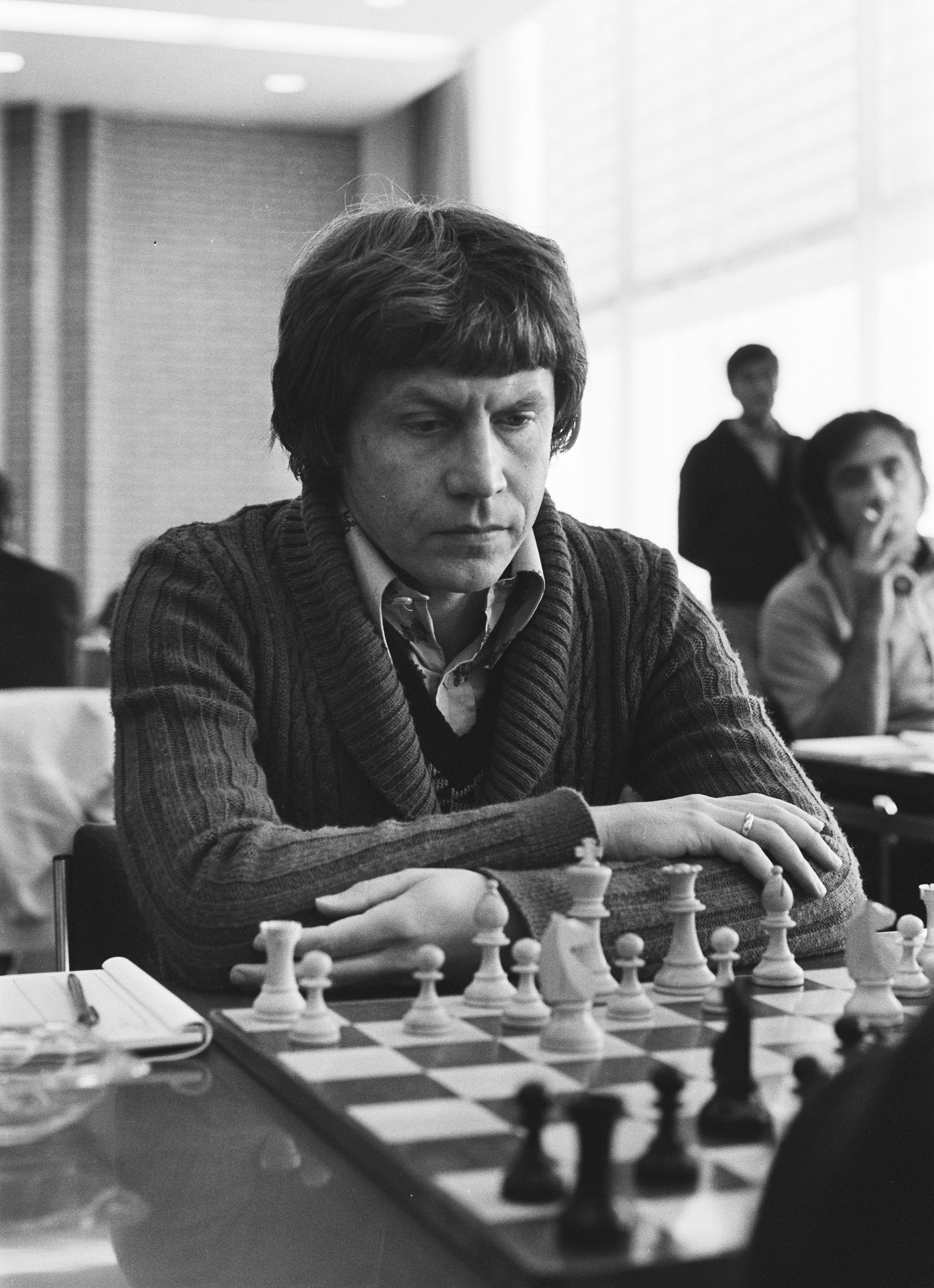
- Adorján in 1978

Personal information
- Born: 31 March 1950 Budapest, Hungary
- Died: 11 May 2023 (aged 73)

Chess career
- Country: Hungary
- Title: Grandmaster (1973)
- Peak rating: 2570 (January 1984)
- Peak ranking: No. 20 (July 1984)

András Adorján (born András Jocha; 31 March 1950 – 11 May 2023) was a Hungarian Chess Grandmaster (1973) and author. He adopted his mother's maiden name, Adorján, in 1968.

== Chess career ==
In 1969–1970, Adorján secured the title of European Junior Champion at the 'Niemeyer Tournament' in Groningen, and in 1969 at Stockholm, he finished runner-up in the World Junior Chess Championship to Anatoly Karpov. His qualification as an International Master came in 1970 and as a Grandmaster in 1973. The latter was also the year that he won (jointly) his first Hungarian Championship, going on to a further (this time outright) victory in 1984.

Other tournament successes (finishing either first or joint first) included Varna 1972, Osijek 1978, Budapest 1982, Gjovik 1983, Esbjerg 1985 and New York Open 1987. In an interview, he recounts the story of his telephoned invitation to Luhacovice in 1973; he enquired—"Is there a GM norm on offer?", to which came the answer "Yes". His next question—"When does it start?" was met with the reply "Half an hour ago". He also went on to win that tournament. At the Riga Interzonal of 1979, he finished joint third and qualified for the World Championship Candidates Tournament via tiebreaks, after drawing a match (+1 −1 =2) with fellow Hungarian Zoltán Ribli. At the Candidates he lost his quarter-final match to Robert Hübner.

In team chess, Adorján had an excellent record. Competing at the Chess Olympiad of 1978, he helped Hungary to capture the gold medal from the Soviet team, who had convincingly won the event twelve consecutive times from 1952 through 1974. His further participation in 1984, 1986 and 1988 contributed to a top five finish on each occasion. Compatriots Lajos Portisch, Ribli and Gyula Sax were also at the peak of their playing strength during this period.

Adorján also worked over the years, sometimes secretly, as a second to Garry Kasparov and to Peter Leko, helping them to prepare for important World Championship matches. He was known as a leading expert on the Grünfeld Defence, which was favored by both Kasparov and Leko.

== Author ==
In later years, Adorján played less and concentrated more on writing, becoming renowned for his series of books championing the cause of the player of the black pieces—Black is OK, Black is Still OK and Black is OK Forever. The books challenge the popular perceptions of Black's chances and diagrammed positions are even presented with the black pieces playing up the board. For their creativity with the black pieces, Adorján cited the games of Tony Miles and Alexander Morozevich as a source of inspiration.

In one review, it was suggested that Adorján's books could have been co-authored by Botvinnik and Monty Python.

In the field of chess opening theory, Adorján's passions in many ways mirrored the theme of his books. Typical is his handling of the 'Hedgehog System' versus the English Opening. The system seeks to neutralise white's first move advantage by engineering rapid piece development on the queenside, behind flexible, low-key pawn moves (such as d6, a6 and b6). The formation is said to resemble the prickly spines of the hedgehog, repelling premature attacks and offering no soft targets.

== Death ==
Adorján died on 11 May 2023, at the age of 73.

== Books ==
- Adorján, András; Dory, Jeno (1987). Winning With the Grunfeld. Macmillan. ISBN 0-02-016080-1.
- Adorján, András (1989). Black is OK!. Batsford. ISBN 978-0-7134-5790-2.
- Adorján, András (1998). Black is O.K. in Rare Openings. Caissa Books.
- Adorján, András (2004). Black is Still OK!. Batsford. ISBN 978-0-7134-8870-8.
- Adorján, András (2005). Black is OK Forever!. Batsford. ISBN 978-0-7134-8942-2.
- Adorján, András (2016). Black is Back! What's White's Advantage Anyway?. New in Chess. ISBN 978-9056916619.
