= Gambit Publications =

- Founder: John Nunn, Murray Chandler, and Graham Burgess
- Country of origin: United Kingdom
- Headquarters location: London
- Distribution: Central Books (UK); Two Rivers Distribution (US)
- Publication types: Books
- Nonfiction topics: Chess
- Official website: www.gambitbooks.com

Gambit Publications is a major publisher of chess books. The company's headquarters is in London. It has published more than 200 chess books.

The company was founded by three chess players. Grandmaster (GM) John Nunn is the chess director, GM Murray Chandler is the managing director, and FIDE Master Graham Burgess is the editorial director.

Some of the major books published by Gambit are Mastering the Chess Openings (four volumes) by John Watson, Secrets of Modern Chess Strategy also by Watson, Fundamental Chess Endings by Karsten Müller and Frank Lamprecht, Understanding the Chess Openings by Sam Collins, and the new Chess Explained series by various authors.

== See also ==
- List of chess books
