= John L. Watson =

American chess player (born 1951)

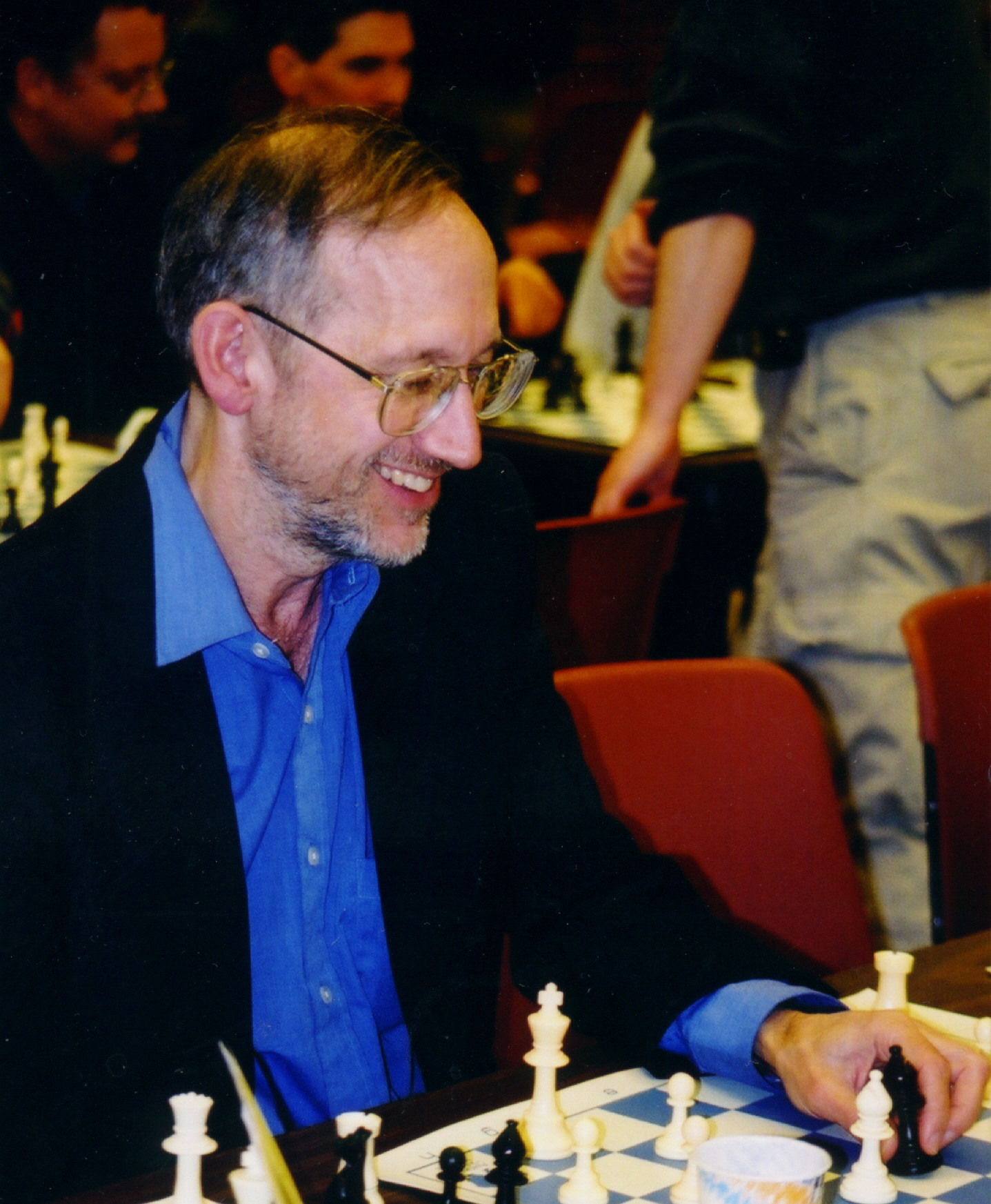
- Watson in 2003

Personal information
- Born: John Leonard Watson; 1951 (age 74–75) Milwaukee, Wisconsin, U.S.

Chess career
- Country: United States
- Title: International Master (1979)
- Peak rating: 2430 (January 1981)

John Leonard Watson (born 1951) is an American chess player and author who was awarded the title of International Master in 1979.

In 2022, he was inducted into the U.S. Chess Hall of Fame along with GM James Tarjan and the late Daniel Willard Fiske. He is also a recipient of the US Chess Federation's Frank J. Marshall Award, and a 2015 inductee into the Colorado Chess Hall of Fame.

== Life ==
Watson was born in Milwaukee and grew up in Omaha, Nebraska. He was educated at Brownell-Talbot, Harvard, and the University of California, San Diego, where he took his degree in engineering. He has won many chess tournaments including the first US National High School Chess Championship and the American Open.

Watson is a renowned chess theorist and author, having published more than thirty books on many aspects of chess. His 1999 book Secrets of Modern Chess Strategy won the British Chess Federation's Book of the Year award as well as the United States Chess Federation Book of the Year. The successor volume Chess Strategy in Action was the Chesscafe Book of the Year. These two books explore and theorize how radically chess has changed since the early 20th century, and how old and supposedly 'time-tested' rules for the conduct of play have been replaced by broader and revolutionary practice over the board. These books have been translated into several languages. In a lighter vein, Watson wrote the Chessman comic book series, illustrated by Chris Hendrickson and Svein Myreng. Chessman comics are now out-of-print collector's items. Watson has a regular book review columns at The Week in Chess, the publication of the London Chess Centre (available online), and in Chess Life. His weekly Internet radio show 'Chess Talk with John Watson' was hosted by on Chess.FM, the radio arm of the Internet Chess Club (ICC).

Watson is much in demand as a chess coach; his students have included Tal Shaked, the 1997 World Junior Champion, Senior Master Patrick Hummel, Abby Marshall, and other US scholastic champions.

Watson is married to drama scholar Maura Giles-Watson, who teaches at the University of San Diego; they live in San Diego, California.

== Selected books ==
- Play the French, third edition, (Cadogan Chess Books) ISBN 1-85744-337-3
- The Unconventional King's Indian ISBN 1-84382-150-8
- The Gambit Guide to the Modern Benoni ISBN 1-901983-23-4
- Secrets of Modern Chess Strategy: Advances since Nimzowitsch, Gambit Publications, 1999, ISBN 1-901983-07-2
- Chess Strategy in Action, Gambit, 2003, ISBN 1-901983-69-2
- English 1...P-K4 ISBN 1-84382-144-3
- Dangerous Weapons: The French, Everyman Chess (2007): ISBN 978-1-85744-435-3
- Mastering the Chess Openings, Gambit Publications (in four volumes)
  - Volume 1 (1. e4): ISBN 1-904600-60-3 (2006)
  - Volume 2 (1. d4): ISBN 1-904600-69-7 (2007)
  - Volume 3 (1. c4): ISBN 1-904600-98-0 (2009)
  - Volume 4: ISBN 978-1-906454-19-7 (2010)
