= Joseph Gallagher =

English-Swiss chess grandmaster (born 1964)

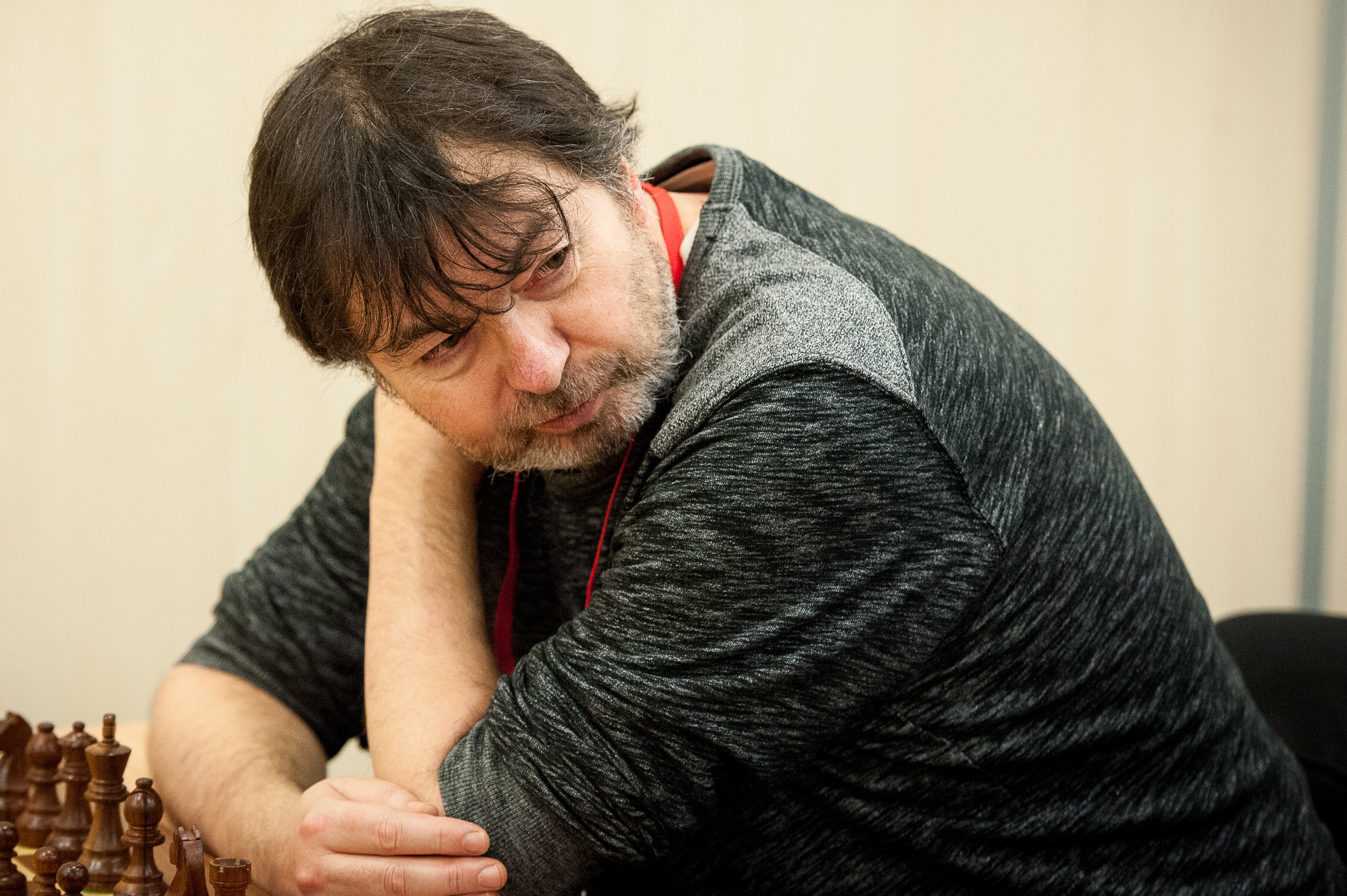
- Gallagher in 2016

Personal information
- Born: Joseph Gerald Gallagher; 4 May 1964 (age 62) London, England

Chess career
- Country: England (until 1997); Switzerland (since 1997)
- Title: Grandmaster (1990)
- Peak rating: 2558 (January 2000)

Joseph Gerald Gallagher (born 4 May 1964) is an English-Swiss chess player and writer. He was awarded the title of Grandmaster by FIDE in 1990 and has been the national champion of both Britain and Switzerland.

== Career ==
Born to Irish parents Norah and Patrick, Gallagher was the eldest child (his sisters Catherine, Noreen, Pauline and Marie, and brother Stephen also played chess). He played for many years on the European chess circuit, before marrying and moving to Neuchâtel in Switzerland, taking Swiss nationality, being awarded the title of Grandmaster in 1990, and then winning the British Chess Championship in 2001 and the Swiss Chess Championship in 1997, 1998, 2004, 2005, 2007, 2012 and 2021.

He has represented his adopted country Switzerland regularly at the Chess Olympiad and at the European Team Chess Championship since 1997, his best result occurring at the 2006 Chess Olympiad, when he scored 6 1/2/10.

Gallagher is a noted author on various aspects of chess opening theory, being an expert on the King's Indian Defence as Black and the King's Gambit as White. Gallagher was one of four writers of the popular volume Nunn's Chess Openings (Everyman Chess, 1999).

== Books ==
- Gallagher, Joe (1992), Winning With the King's Gambit, Batsford, ISBN 0-7134-6944-7
- Gallagher, Joe (1994), Beating the Anti-Sicilians, Batsford/Henry Holt and Company, ISBN 0-8050-3575-3
- Gallagher, Joe (1995), The Samisch King's Indian, Batsford, ISBN 0-8050-3902-3
- Nunn, John; Gallagher, Joe (1995), Beating the Sicilian 3, Batsford/Henry Holt and Company, ISBN 0-8050-4227-X
- Gallagher, Joe (1996), Beating the Anti-King's Indians, Batsford/International Chess Enterprises, ISBN 1-879479-36-2
- Gallagher, Joe (1998), The Trompovsky, Chess Press, ISBN 1-901259-09-9
- Gallagher, Joe (1999), c3 Sicilian, Gloucester Publishers, ISBN 1-857442-90-3
- Gallagher, Joe (2000), 101 Attacking Ideas in Chess, Gambit Publications, ISBN 1-901983-20-X
- Gallagher, Joe (2001), The Magic of Mikhail Tal, Everyman Chess, ISBN 1-85744-266-0
- Gallagher, Joe (2002), Starting Out: the Caro-Kann, Everyman Chess, ISBN 1-85744-303-9
- Gallagher, Joe (2002), Starting Out: King's Indian, Everyman Chess, ISBN 1-85744-234-2
- Gallagher, Joe (2003), Starting Out: The Pirc/Modern, Everyman Chess, ISBN 1-85744-336-5
- Gallagher, Joe (2004), Play the King's Indian, Everyman Chess, ISBN 1-85744-324-1
