= Popular Chess =

Major publisher of books and CDs about chess

- Country of origin: United Kingdom
- Headquarters location: London
- Distribution: Central Books (UK) Simon & Schuster (USA)
- Publication types: books and CDs
- Nonfiction topics: Chess
- Official website: popularchess.com

Popular Chess, formerly known as Everyman Chess and Cadogan Chess, is a major publisher of books and CDs about chess. "Everyman" is a registered trademark of Random House and the company headquarters is in London. Former world chess champion Garry Kasparov is their chief advisor and John Emms is the general editor, assisted by Richard Palliser. The company is now known as "Gloucester Publishers".

In 2024 it was announced that Popular Chess was sold to Quality Chess. Due to a rights issue, Everyman had to continue under the name Popular Chess.

In addition to individual books, the company publishes some series of books. Some of their most famous series of books are:

- Winning Chess series by Grandmaster Yasser Seirawan
- Starting Out series by various writers, including John Emms, Chris Ward, Glenn Flear, Joe Gallagher, Richard Palliser, and John Shaw
- Move by Move series by various writers, including John Emms, Steve Giddins, Adam Hunt, Colin Crouch, and Cyrus Lakdawala
- My Great Predecessors series of five volumes by Garry Kasparov
- Modern Chess series by Garry Kasparov
- Dangerous Weapons series of books on openings

The Starting Out-series are introductory level books for average players, who have advanced beyond beginner level. These books generally contain a general strategic overview, along with notes on whether the lines are theoretical or not. John Watson has pointed out that the series' main weakness is a lack of in-depth theoretical coverage. Features of the Starting Out series are bolded and graphically labeled notices with tips, warnings and notes. The wide target readership has made the Starting Out series popular. One reviewer expressed concern that many titles are pushed into the Starting Out series as a way of increasing sales, when they would be better suited as a more theoretical work.

== See also ==
- List of chess books
