= List of chess books (G–L) =

This is a list of chess books that are used as references in articles related to chess. The list is organized by alphabetical order of the author's surname, then the author's first name, then the year of publication, then the alphabetical order of title.

As a general rule, only the original edition should be listed except when different editions bring additional encyclopedic value. Examples of exceptions include:

- When various editions are different enough to be considered as nearly a different book, for example for opening encyclopedias when each edition is completely revised and has even different authors (example: Modern Chess Openings).
- When the book is too old to have an ID (ISBN, OCLC number, ...) that makes it easy for the reader to find it. In that case, both the first and the last edition can be indicated (example: My 60 Memorable Games).

Authors with five books or more have a sub-section title on their own, to increase the usability of the table of contents (see at right). When a book was written by several authors, it is listed once under the name of each author.

== G ==
- Gaige, Jeremy (1987). Chess Personalia, A Biobibliography. McFarland. ISBN 0-7864-2353-6.

=== Gallagher, Joe ===
- Gallagher, Joe (1993). Winning With the King's Gambit. Henry Holt. ISBN 978-0-8050-2631-3.
- Gallagher, Joe (1994). Beating the anti-Sicilians. Henry Holt. ISBN 0-8050-3575-3.
- Gallagher, Joe; Nunn, John (1995). Beating the Sicilian 3. Henry Holt. ISBN 0-8050-4227-X.
- Gallagher, Joe (1995). The Samisch King's Indian. Henry Holt. ISBN 0-8050-3902-3.
- Gallagher, Joe (1996). Beating the Anti-King's Indians. Batsford.
- Gallagher, Joe (1998). The Trompovsky. Chess Press. ISBN 1-901259-09-9.
- Gallagher, Joe; Burgess, Graham; Emms, John; Nunn, John (1999). Nunn's Chess Openings. Everyman Chess. ISBN 1-85744-221-0.
- Gallagher, Joe (2002). Starting Out: the Caro-Kann. Everyman Chess. ISBN 1-85744-303-9.
- Gallagher, Joe (2003). Starting Out: The Pirc/Modern. Everyman Chess. ISBN 1-85744-336-5.
- Gallagher, Joe (2004). Play the King's Indian. Everyman Chess. ISBN 978-1-85744-324-0.
- Gallagher, Joe (2006). Starting Out: Sicilian Najdorf. Everyman Chess. ISBN 978-1-85744-392-9.

- Gaprindashvili, Paata (2004). Imagination in Chess. Batsford. ISBN 0-7134-8891-3.
- Gelfand, Boris; Kapengut, Albert (1996). A65 Benoni. Belgrade: Chess Informant.
- Gelfand, Boris (2005). My Most Memorable Games. Olms. ISBN 978-3-283-00453-8.
- Gelfer, Israel (1991). Positional Chess Handbook. Batsford. ISBN 0-7134-6395-3.
- Geller, Efim; Gligorić, Svetozar; Kavalek, Lubomir; Spassky, Boris (1976). The Najdorf Variation of the Sicilian Defense. RHM Press. ISBN 0-89058-025-1.
- Geller, Efim (1995). The Application of Chess Theory. Everyman Chess. ISBN 978-1-85744-067-6.
- Gelo, James H. (2006). Chess World Championships: All the Games, All with Diagrams, 1834–2004. McFarland. ISBN 978-0-7864-2568-6.
- Georgiev, Kiril; Kolev, Atanas (2007). The Sharpest Sicilian. Simolini 94. ISBN 978-954-8782-56-2.
- Gershon, Alik; Nor, Igor (2006). San Luis 2005: How Chess Found Its Champion. Quality Chess. ISBN 91-976005-2-0.

=== Giddins, Stephen ===
- Giddins, Stephen (1998). 101 Chess Opening Traps.
- Giddins, Stephen (2003). How to build your chess opening repertoire.
- Giddins, Stephen (2006). 50 Essential Chess Lessons. Gambit Publications, Limited. ISBN 9781904600411.
- Giddins, Stephen (2007). 101 Chess Endgame Tips: Golden nuggets of endgame wisdom. Gambit Publications. ISBN 978-1-904600-66-4.
- Giddins, Stephen (2008). 50 Ways to Win at Chess.
- Giddins, Stephen (2012). The Greatest Ever Chess Endgames. Everyman Chess. ISBN 978-1-85744-694-4.

- Gilberg, Charles A. (1881). The Fifth American Chess Congress.
- Gillam, Anthony J.; Swift, A.J. (2001). 1st European championship Munich 1942. The Chess Player. ISBN 1-901034-46-1.
- Glaskov, Igor; Tseitlin, Mikhail (1992). The Budapest for the Tournament Player. Batsford. ISBN 978-0-8050-2431-9.

=== Gligorić, Svetozar ===
- Gligorić, Svetozar (1970). Selected Chess Masterpieces. Pitman. ISBN 978-0-273-40414-9.
- Gligorić, Svetozar (1988). Šahovski vodič. T. 1, Suština šaha. Belgrade. ISBN 86-80001-02-3.
- Gligorić, Svetozar (1989). Igram protiv figura. Belgrade. ISBN 86-80001-04-X.
- Gligorić, Svetozar (1991). Peti meč Kasparov–Karpov za titulu svetskog prvaka. Belgrade. ISBN 86-80001-07-4.
- Gligorić, Svetozar (2000). Gligina varijanta. Belgrade.
- Gligorić, Svetozar; Uhlmann, Wolfgang; Karpov, Anatoly (1975). The French Defence. RHM Press. ISBN 978-089-05820-84.
- Evans, Larry; Gligorić, Svetozar; Hort, Vlastimil; Keres, Paul; Larsen, Bent; Petrosian, Tigran; Portisch, Lajos (1974). How to Open a Chess game. RHM Press. ISBN 978-0-890-58203-9.
- Gligorić, Svetozar (1972). Fischer vs. Spassky - The Chess Match of the Century. Simon & Schuster. ISBN 978-0-671-21397-8.
- Gligorić, Svetozar (2003). King's Indian Defence - Mar del Plata Variation. Batsford. ISBN 978-0-7134-8767-1.
- Gligorić, Svetozar (2005). I Play Against Pieces. Rain Tree Publishing. ISBN 978-0-7134-8770-1.

- Gobet, Fernand (1993). Les mémoires d'un joueur d'échecs (in French). Editions Universitaires. ISBN 2-8271-0610-8.
- Gobet, Fernand; de Groot, Adriaan D. (1996). Perception and memory in chess. Studies in the heuristics of the professional eye. Van Gorcum. ISBN 1-84169-336-7.
- Gobet, Fernand; Retschitzki, Jean; de Voogt, Alex (2004). Moves in mind: The psychology of board games. Psychology Press. ISBN 1-84169-336-7.
- Goldstein, Maurice Edward; Griffith, Richard; Sergeant, Philip Walsingham; White, John Herbert (1925). Modern Chess Openings (4th ed.). Whitehead & Miller.
- Goldstein, Maurice Edward; Griffith, Richard; Sergeant, Philip Walsingham; White, John Herbert (1932). Modern Chess Openings (5th ed.). Whitehead & Miller.
- Golombek, Harry (1955). The Game of Chess. Penguin. ISBN 978-0-14-046024-7.
- Golombek, Harry (1976). Chess: A History. G.P. Putnam's Sons. ISBN 0-399-11575-7.
- Golombek, Harry (1977). Golombek's Encyclopedia of Chess. Crown Publishing. ISBN 0-517-53146-1.
- Golubev, Mikhail (1999). Easy Guide to the Dragon. Everyman Chess. ISBN 978-1-85744-275-5.
- Golubev, Mikhail (2000). The Sicilian Sozin. Gambit Publications. ISBN 978-1-901983-38-8.
- Golubev, Mikhail (2006). Understanding the King's Indian. Gambit Publications. ISBN 1-904600-31-X.
- Golubev, Mikhail (2017). Understanding the Sicilian. Gambit Publications. ISBN 978-1911465-10-2.
- Goodman, David; Keene, Raymond (1986). The Centenary Match - Kasparov-Karpov III. Batsford. ISBN 0-7134-5343-5.
- Gordon, Stephen W. (2011). Samuel Reshevsky. McFarland. ISBN 978-0-7864-6093-9.
- Gormally, Danny; Kosten, Tony (1999). Easy Guide to the Najdorf. Everyman Chess. ISBN 1-85744-529-5.
- Gossip, G.H.D.; Lipschütz, Samuel (1902). The Chess Player's Manual. David McKay.
- Grabinsky, Vladimir; Volokitin, Andrei (2007). Perfect Your Chess. Gambit Publications. ISBN 978-1-904600-82-4.
- Greet, Andrew (2008). Starting Out: The Accelerated Dragon. Everyman Chess. ISBN 978-1-85744-530-5.
- Grefe, John; Waterman, Dennis (1981). The Best of Lone Pine. Great Neck, New York: R.H.M. Press. ISBN 0-89058-049-9.

=== Griffith, Richard ===
- Griffith, Richard; White, John Herbert (1911). Modern Chess Openings (1st ed.).
- Griffith, Richard; White, John Herbert (1913). Modern Chess Openings (2nd ed.). Longmans & Green.
- Griffith, Richard; White, John Herbert (1916). Modern Chess Openings (3rd ed.). Longmans & Green.
- Griffith, Richard; Goldstein, Maurice Edward; Sergeant, Philip Walsingham; White, John Herbert (1925). Modern Chess Openings (4th ed.). Whitehead & Miller.
- Griffith, Richard; Goldstein, Maurice Edward; Sergeant, Philip Walsingham; White, John Herbert (1932). Modern Chess Openings (5th ed.). Whitehead & Miller.
- Griffith, Richard; Fine, Reuben; Sergeant, Philip Walsingham; White, John Herbert (1939). Modern Chess Openings (6th ed.). Whitehead & Miller.
- Griffith, Richard; Korn, Walter; Sergeant, Philip Walsingham; White, John Herbert (1946). Modern Chess Openings (7th ed.). Sir Isaac Pitman & Sons.

- Griffiths, Peter (1992). Exploring the Endgame. American Chess Promotions. ISBN 0-939298-83-X.

=== Grivas, Efstratios ===
- Grivas, Efstratios (2005). A Complete Guide to the Grivas Sicilian. Gambit Publications. ISBN 1-904600-36-0.
- Grivas, Efstratios (2006). Beating the Fianchetto Defences. Gambit Publications. ISBN 978-1-904600-48-0.
- Grivas, Efstratios (2006). Chess College 1: Strategy. Gambit Publications. ISBN 978-1-904600-45-9.
- Grivas, Efstratios (2006). Chess College 2: Pawn Play. Gambit Publications. ISBN 978-1-904600-47-3.
- Grivas, Efstratios (2006). Chess College 3: Technique. Gambit Publications. ISBN 978-1-904600-57-2.
- Grivas, Efstratios (2007). Modern Chess Planning. Gambit Publications. ISBN 978-1-904600-68-8.
- Grivas, Efstratios (2008). Practical Endgame Play - mastering the basics. Hull, Québec: Everyman Chess. ISBN 978-1-85744-556-5.

- de Groot, Adriaan (1965). Thought and choice in chess. Mouton Publishers. ISBN 90-279-7914-6.
- de Groot, Adriaan; Gobet, Fernand (1996). Perception and memory in chess. Studies in the heuristics of the professional eye. Van Gorcum. ISBN 1-84169-336-7.
- Guéneau, Christophe; Piket, Jeroen; Polugaevsky, Lev (1995). Sicilian Love: Lev Polugaevsky Chess Tournament, Bueno Aires 1994. New in Chess. ISBN 90-71689-99-9.

=== Gufeld, Eduard ===
- Gufeld, Eduard (1986). Queen's Gambit Accepted. Simon & Schuster. ISBN 978-0-02-020760-3.
- Gufeld, Eduard (1988). Benko Gambit Accepted. Simon & Schuster. ISBN 978-0-02-043281-4.
- Gufeld, Eduard; Stetsko, Oleg (1994). Winning With the Torre Attack. Henry Holt & Co. ISBN 0-8050-3280-0.
- Gufeld, Eduard (1998). Secrets of the Sicilian Dragon. Cardoza. ISBN 0-940685-92-2.
- Gufeld, Eduard; Stetsko, Oleg (2000). Richter-Veresov System: The Chameleon Chess Repertoire. Thinkers Pr Inc / Chessco. ISBN 978-0-938650-97-3.

- Gulko, Boris; Sneed, Joel R. (2011). Lessons with a Grandmaster. Everyman Chess. ISBN 978-1-85744-668-5.
- Gurevich, Mikhail (1992). Queen's Indian Defence: Kasparov System. Batsford. ISBN 0-8050-2315-1.
- Gutman, Lev (2001). 4... Qh4 in the Scotch Game. Batsford. ISBN 0-7134-8607-4.
- Gutman, Lev (2004). Budapest Fajarowicz: The Fajarowicz-Richter Gambit in Action. Batsford. ISBN 0-7134-8708-9.
- Gvozdják, Peter (2001). Cyclone: a Study of the Cyclic Chess Problem. Éditions de L'Apprenti Sorcier. ISBN 0-9688828-5-4.

== H ==
- Hale, Benjamin (2008). Philosophy Looks at Chess. Open Court Publishing Company. ISBN 978-0-8126-9633-2.
- Hall, John; Cartier, Jan R. (1996). Modern King's Indian Attack – A Complete System for White. Hays. ISBN 1-880673-11-8.
- Hankins, Thomas Leroy; Silverman, Robert J. (1995). Instruments and the Imagination. Princeton University Press. ISBN 0-691-02997-0.

=== Hansen, Carsten ===
- Hansen, Carsten (2000). The Symmetrical English. Gambit. ISBN 978-1-901983-40-1.
- Hansen, Carsten (2002). The Nimzo-Indian: 4 e3. Gambit. ISBN 1-901983-58-7.
- Hansen, Carsten (2005). Improve Your Positional Chess. Gambit. ISBN 978-1-904600-00-8.
- Hansen, Carsten; Nielsen, Peter Heine (2006). Sicilian Accelerated Dragon. Sterling Pub. ISBN 978-0-7134-8947-7.
- Hansen, Carsten; Donaldson, John W. (2008). A Strategic Opening Repertoire. Russell Enterprises. ISBN 978-1-888690-41-5.

- Hansen, Lars Bo (2006). Secrets of Chess Endgame Strategy. Gambit. ISBN 1-904600-44-1.

=== Harding, Tim ===
- Harding, Tim; Botterill, George (1977). The Italian Game. Batsford. ISBN 0-7134-3261-6.
- Harding, Tim (1996). The fighting Fajarowicz. Chess Digest. ISBN 978-0-87568-281-5.
- Harding, Tim; Cafferty, Bernard (1997). Play the Evans Gambit. Cadogan. ISBN 1-85744-119-2.
- Harding, Tim (2002). 64 Great Chess Games. Chess Mail. ISBN 0-9538536-4-0.
- Harding, Tim (2003). Better Chess for Average Players. Courier Dover Publications. ISBN 0-486-29029-8.

- Harley, Andrew; Rozentalis, Eduardas (2002). Play the 2.c3 Sicilian. Gambit. ISBN 1-901983-56-0.
- Harman, Ron; Taulbut, Shaun (1993). Winning with the Scandinavian. Henry Holt. ISBN 0-8050-2935-4.
- Harkness, Kenneth (1956). The Official Blue Book and Encyclopedia of Chess. David McKay. LCCN 56014153.
- Harkness, Kenneth (1967). Official Chess Handbook. David McKay. LCCN 66013085.
- Harkness, Kenneth (1970). Official Chess Rulebook. McKay. ISBN 0-679-13028-4.
- Harper, Bruce; Nakamura, Hikaru (2009). Bullet Chess: One Minute to Mate. Russell Enterprises. ISBN 978-1-888690-67-5.
- Hartleb, Glenn; Whitaker, Norman T. (1960). 365 Selected Endings.

=== Hartston, William ===
- Hartston, William (1971). The Grunfeld Defence. Chess Digest. ISBN 0-7134-0355-1.
- Hartston, William (1973). The Benoni (2nd ed.). London: B. T. Batsford Ltd. ISBN 978-0-7134-0372-5.
- Hartston, William; Reuben, Stewart (1981). London 1980. Pergamon Press. ISBN 0-08-024140-9.
- Hartston, William (1985). The Kings of Chess. Harper & Row. ISBN 0-06-015358-X.
- Hartston, William (1996). Teach Yourself Chess. Hodder & Stoughton. ISBN 0-340-67039-8.

- Hatton-Ward; Alekhine, Alexander (1932). Sixty-Six Master Games played in the London International Chess Tournament 1932.
- Hearst, Eliot; Knott, John (2008). Blindfold Chess: History, Psychology, Techniques, Champions, World Records, and Important Games. McFarland & Co Inc Pub. ISBN 978-0-7864-3444-2.
- Heisman, Dan; Knott, John (2010). Elements of Positional Evaluation. Russell Enterprises. ISBN 978-1-888690-58-3.
- Heisman, Dan (2010). A Guide To Chess Improvement. Everyman Chess. ISBN 978-1-85744-649-4.
- Hellsten, Johan (2008). Play the Sicilian Kan. Everyman Chess. ISBN 978-1-85744-581-7.
- Hellsten, Johan (2010). Mastering Chess Strategy. Everyman Chess. ISBN 978-1-85744-648-7.
- Henkin, V.; Averbakh, Yuri; Chekhover, Vitaly (1978). Comprehensive Chess Endings: Queen v. Rook/Minor Piece Endings. Batsford. ISBN 978-0-7134-0866-9.
- Henley, Ron; Hodges, Paul (1993). Power Play - The King's Indian Attack. R&D Publishing. ISBN 1-883358-02-7.
- von Heydebrand und der Lasa, Tassilo; von Bilguer, Paul Rudolf; Schlechter, Carl (1916). Handbuch des Schachspiels (in German). Walter de Gruyter.
- Hodges, Paul; Henley, Ron (1993). Power Play - The King's Indian Attack. R&D Publishing. ISBN 1-883358-02-7.
- Hodgson, Julian (1992). Bird's Opening. Trends Publications.
- Hoffmann, Professor (1900). The Chess Games of Greco. George Routledge & Sons.
- Hooper, David (1970). A Pocket Guide to Chess Endgames. Bell & Hyman. ISBN 0-7135-1761-1.
- Hooper, David; Whyld, Kenneth (1984). The Oxford Companion to Chess. Oxford University Press. ISBN 0-19-217540-8.
- Hooper, David; Brandreth, Dale (1994). The Unknown Capablanca. Dover Publications. ISBN 978-0-486-27614-4.
- Hoover, Todd; Manson, John F. (1992). Siamese Chess. How To Play ... How to Win!. Farnsworth.

=== Horowitz, Israel Albert ===
- Horowitz, Israel A. (1951). "How to Win in the Chess Openings". Cornerstone Library.
- Horowitz, Israel A.; Reinfeld, Fred (1951). How to Think Ahead in Chess. Simon and Schuster. ISBN 978-0-671-21138-7.
- Horowitz, Israel A.; Reinfeld, Fred (1954). Chess Traps, Pitfalls, and Swindles. Simon and Schuster. ISBN 0-671-21041-6.
- Horowitz, Israel A. (1964). Chess Openings: Theory and Practice. Simon and Schuster.
- Horowitz, Israel A. (1971). All About Chess. Collier Books.
- Horowitz, Israel A. (1973). World Chess Championship, A History. Macmillan. OCLC 604994.

- Horton, Byrne Joseph (1959). Dictionary of Modern Chess. Owen. ISBN 0-8022-0746-4.
- Houska, Jovanka (2007). Play the Caro-Kann: A Complete Chess Opening Repertoire Against 1 e4. Everyman Chess. ISBN 978-1-85744-434-6.
- Howard, Kenneth S. (1961). How To Solve Chess Problems. Dover Publications. ISBN 0-486-20748-X.
- Howell, James (1997). Essential Chess Endings: the Tournament Player's Guide. Batsford. ISBN 0-7134-8189-7.
- Hsu, Feng-Hsiung (2002). Behind Deep Blue: Building the Computer that Defeated the World Chess Champion. Princeton University Press. ISBN 0-691-09065-3.

== J ==
- James, Richard; Fox, Mike (1993). The Even More Complete Chess Addict. Faber & Faber.
- Jansa, Vlastimil (2003). Dynamics of Chess Strategy. Batsford. ISBN 0-7134-8608-2.
- Johansson, Thomas (2005). The Fascinating King's Gambit. Wallin, Maria (Illustrator). Trafford on Demand. ISBN 978-1-4120-4647-3.
- Johansson, Thomas (2005). The King's Gambit for the Creative Aggressor. Schachverlag Kania. ISBN 978-3-9311-9209-9.
- Johnsen, Sverre; Kovacevic, Vlatko (2005). Win with the London System. Gambit. ISBN 1-904600-35-2.
- Johnsen, Sverre; Bern, Ivar; Agdestein, Simen (2009). Win With the Stonewall Dutch. Gambit. ISBN 978-1-906454-07-4.
- Jones, Gawain (2005). Starting Out: The Grand Prix Attack. Everyman Chess. ISBN 978-1-85744-547-3.
- Just, Tim; Burg, Daniel B. (2003). U.S. Chess Federation's Official Rules of Chess (5th ed.). McKay. ISBN 0-8129-3559-4.

== K ==
- Kahn, Victor; Renaud, Georges (1962). The Art of the Checkmate. Dover Publications. ISBN 0-486-20106-6.
- Kalendovský, Jan; Fiala, Vlastimil (1992). Complete Games of Alekhine: Volume I, 1892–1921. Moravian Chess. ISBN 80-85476-10-X.
- Kallai, Gabor; Ribli, Zoltán (1987). Winning With the Queen's Indian. Simon & Schuster. ISBN 978-0-02-029801-4.
- Kallai, Gabor; Ribli, Zoltán (1993). Winning With the English. Henry Holt. ISBN 978-0-8050-2642-9.
- Kallai, Gabor (1997). Basic Chess Openings. Everyman Chess. ISBN 978-1-85744-113-0.
- Kallai, Gabor (1997). More Basic Chess Openings. Everyman Chess. ISBN 978-1-85744-206-9.
- Kapu, Jenö; Alföldy, Laszló; Barcza, Gedeon (1975). Die Weltmeister des Schachspiels (in German). Corvina Verlag. ISBN 978-3-88086-049-0.

=== Karolyi, Tibor ===
- Karolyi, Tibor (2004). Judit Polgar: The Princess of Chess. Batsford. ISBN 0-7134-8890-5.
- Karolyi, Tibor; Aplin, Nick (2007). Kasparov's Fighting Chess 1993–1998. Batsford. ISBN 978-0-7134-8994-1.
- Karolyi, Tibor; Aplin, Nick (2007). Kasparov's Fighting Chess 1999–2005. Batsford. ISBN 978-0-7134-8984-2.
- Karolyi, Tibor; Aplin, Nick (2007). Endgame Virtuoso Anatoly Karpov. New In Chess. ISBN 978-90-5691-202-4.
- Karolyi, Tibor; Aplin, Nick (2009). Kasparov: How His Predecessors Misled Him About Chess. Batsford. ISBN 978-1-906388-26-3.
- Karolyi, Tibor; Aplin, Nick (2009). Genius in the Background. Quality Chess. ISBN 978-1-906552-37-4.
- Karolyi, Tibor (2011). Karpov's Strategic Wins 1: The Making of a Champion 1961–1985. Quality Chess. ISBN 978-1-906552-41-1.
- Karolyi, Tibor (2011). Karpov's Strategic Wins 2: The Prime Years 1986–2009. Quality Chess. ISBN 978-1-906552-42-8.

- Karpov, Anatoly (1990). Karpov on Karpov: Memoirs of a chess world champion. Liberty Publishing. ISBN 0-689-12060-5.
- Karpov, Anatoly (1992). Beating the Grünfeld. Batsford.
- Karpov, Anatoly (2006). Caro-Kann Defence: Advance Variation and Gambit System. Batsford. ISBN 0-7134-9010-1.
- Kashdan, Isaac (1968). Second Piatigorsky Cup. Dover (1977 ed.). ISBN 0-486-23572-6.

=== Kasparov, Garry ===
- Kasparov, Garry; Shakarov, Aleksander (1984). Caro-Kann : Classical 4.Bf5. Batsford. ISBN 0-7134-4237-9.
- Kasparov, Garry; Keene, Raymond (1989). Batsford Chess Openings 2. Henry Holt. ISBN 0-8050-3409-9.
- Kasparov, Garry (1986). Kasparov Teaches Chess. Londres: Batsford. ISBN 0-7134-5526-8.
- Kasparov, Garry (2003). My Great Predecessors, Part I. Everyman Chess. ISBN 1-85744-330-6.
- Kasparov, Garry (2003). My Great Predecessors, Part II. Everyman Chess. ISBN 1-85744-342-X.
- Kasparov, Garry (2004). My Great Predecessors, Part III. Everyman Chess. ISBN 1-85744-371-3.
- Kasparov, Garry (2004). My Great Predecessors, Part IV. Everyman Chess. ISBN 1-85744-395-0.
- Kasparov, Garry (2006). My Great Predecessors, Part V. Everyman Chess. ISBN 1-85744-404-3.
- Kasparov, Garry (2007). Modern Chess, Part 1: Revolution in the 1970s. Everyman Chess. ISBN 978-1-85744-422-3.
- Kasparov, Garry (2008). Modern Chess, Part 2: Kasparov vs Karpov 1975–1985. Everyman Chess. ISBN 978-1-85744-433-9.
- Kasparov, Garry (2009). Modern Chess: Part 3, Kasparov vs Karpov 1986–1987. Everyman Chess. ISBN 978-1-85744-625-8.
- Kasparov, Garry (2010). Modern Chess: Part 4, Kasparov vs Karpov 1988–2009. Everyman Chess. ISBN 978-1-85744-652-4.
- Kasparov, Garry (2011). Garry Kasparov on Garry Kasparov, Part One: 1973–1985. Translated by Ken Neat. London: Everyman Chess. ISBN 978-1-85744-672-2.

- Kaufeld, Jurgen; Kern, Guido (2011). Grandmaster Chess Strategy: What Amateurs Can Learn from Ulf Andersson's Positional Masterpieces. New in Chess. ISBN 978-90-5691-346-5.
- Kaufman, Larry (2004). The Chess Advantage in Black and White. David McKay. ISBN 0-8129-3571-3.
- Kaufman, Larry (2012). The Kaufman Repertoire for Black and White. Alkmaar: New In Chess. ISBN 978-90-5691-371-7.
- Kazić, Bozidar M. (1974). International Championship Chess. Batsford. ISBN 0-7134-2795-7.

=== Keene, Raymond ===
- Keene, Raymond (1974). Aron Nimzowitsch: A Reappraisal. David McKay. ISBN 0-679-13040-3.
- Keene, Raymond (1977). Nimzowitsch/Larsen Attack. Batsford.
- Keene, Raymond (1984). An Opening Repertoire for White. London: B. T. Batsford. ISBN 0-7134-4238-7.
- Keene, Raymond (1984). French Defence: Tarrasch Variation. Batsford. ISBN 0-7134-4577-7.
- Keene, Raymond (1985). The Evolution of Chess Opening Theory. London: Pergamon Press. ISBN 0-08-024127-1.
- Keene, Raymond; Goodman, David (1986). The Centenary Match - Kasparov-Karpov III. Batsford. ISBN 0-7134-5343-5.
- Keene, Raymond; Kasparov, Garry (1989). Batsford Chess Openings 2. Henry Holt. ISBN 0-8050-3409-9.
- Keene, Raymond; Divinsky, Nathan (1989). Warriors of the Mind. Batsford. ISBN 978-0-9513757-0-9.
- Keene, Raymond; Levy, David (1993). How to Play the Opening in Chess. ISBN 0-8050-2937-0.
- Keene, Raymond (2004). World Chess Championship: Kramnik Vs Leko 2004. Hardinge Simpole Limited. ISBN 1-84382-160-5.
- Keene, Raymond; Mednis, Edmar; Soltis, Andy (2004). Understanding The Caro-Kann Defense. Hardinge Simpole Limited. ISBN 978-1-84382-134-2.

- Keilhack, Harald (2005). Knight on the Left: 1.Nc3. Russell Enterprises. ISBN 1-888690-19-4.
- Keres, Paul (1973). Practical Chess Endings. R.H.M. Press. ISBN 0-89058-028-6.
- Keres, Paul; Kotov, Alexander (1964). The Art of the Middle Game. Penguin Books.
- Keres, Paul (1960). Keres' Best Games of Chess. Ishi Press. ISBN 4-87187-548-2.
- Khalifman, Alexander (2002). Alexander Alekhine: Games 1902–1922. Chess Direct. ISBN 978-954-8782-21-0.
- Khalifman, Alexander (2002). Alexander Alekhine: Games 1923–1934. Chess Direct. ISBN 954-8782-23-5.
- Khalifman, Alexander (2002). Alexander Alekhine: Games 1935–1946. Chess Stars. ISBN 978-954-8782-25-8.
- Khodarkovsky, Michael (2003). The Grünfeld Defence Revealed. Batsford. ISBN 0-7134-8827-1.
- Kidder, Harvey (1960). Illustrated Chess for Children. Doubleday. ISBN 0-385-05764-4.

=== King, Daniel ===
- King, Daniel (1995). How to Win at Chess. Everyman Chess. ISBN 9781857440720.
- King, Daniel (1997). Closed Sicilian. Everyman Chess. ISBN 9781901259063.
- King, Daniel (1997). Kasparov v. Deeper Blue: The Ultimate Man v. Machine Challenge. Batsford. ISBN 0-7134-8322-9.
- King, Daniel (1999). English Defence. Everyman Chess. ISBN 9781857442953.
- King, Daniel (2002). Winning With the Najdorf. Sterling Pub Co Inc. ISBN 0-7134-7037-2.
- King, Daniel (2003). How Good is Your Chess. Dover Publications. ISBN 9780486446769.
- King, Daniel (2004). Chess (From First Moves to Checkmate). Kingfisher. ISBN 9780753458204.
- King, Daniel (2005). Test Your Chess with Daniel King. Batsford. ISBN 9780713489330.

- Kinlay, Jon (1981). Sicilian: Keres Attack. Batsford. ISBN 0-7134-2139-8.
- Kinsman, Andrew (1998). The Spanish Exchange. Batsford. ISBN 0-7134-8471-3.
- Kinsman, Andrew (2001). Modern Benoni. Everyman Chess. ISBN 1-85744-222-9.
- Kitsis, Aleksandr (2009). Step by Step:From Beginner to Champion. Lulu.com. ISBN 978-0-557-13168-6.
- Kmoch, Hans; Alekhine, Alexander; Maróczy, Géza; Nimzowitsch, Aron (1928). Das erste International Schachturnier in Kecskemet 1927 (in German).
- Kmoch, Hans (1990) [1959]. Pawn Power in Chess. Dover. ISBN 0-486-26486-6.
- Knaak, Rainer; Müller, Karsten (2008). 222 Opening Traps - after 1.d4. Edition Olms. ISBN 978-3-283-01004-1.
- Knott, John; Hearst, Eliot (2008). Blindfold Chess: History, Psychology, Techniques, Champions, World Records, and Important Games. McFarland & Co Inc Pub. ISBN 978-0-7864-3444-2.
- Kolev, Atanas; Georgiev, Kiril (2007). The Sharpest Sicilian. Simolini 94. ISBN 978-954-8782-56-2.
- Komarov, Dmitry; Djuric, Stefan; Pantaleoni, Claudio (2007). Chess Opening Essentials, Vol. 1: The Complete 1.e4. New In Chess. ISBN 978-90-5691-203-1.
- Komarov, Dmitry; Djuric, Stefan; Pantaleoni, Claudio (2009). Chess Opening Essentials, Vol. 2: 1.d4 d5 / 1.d4 various / Queen's Gambits. New In Chess. ISBN 978-90-5691-269-7.
- Komarov, Dmitry; Djuric, Stefan; Pantaleoni, Claudio (2009). Chess Opening Essentials, Vol. 3: Indian Defences. New In Chess. ISBN 978-90-5691-270-3.
- Kongsted, Christian (2003). How to Use Computers to Improve Your Chess. Gambit Publications.
- Kopec, Danny; Ftáčnik, Ľubomír (2004). Winning the Won Game. Batsford. ISBN 0-7134-8900-6.
- Kislik, Erik (2018). Applying Logic in Chess. Gambit Publications. ISBN 978-1-9114-6524-9.
- Kislik, Erik (2019). Chess Logic in Practice. Gambit Publications. ISBN 978-1-9114-6530-0.

=== Korchnoi, Victor ===
- Korchnoi, Victor; Zak, Vladimir Grigor'evich (1974). King's Gambit. Batsford. ISBN 978-0-7134-2914-5.
- Korchnoi, Victor (2001). My Best Games, Vol 1: Games with White. Trafalgar Square. ISBN 978-3-283-00404-0.
- Korchnoi, Victor (2002). My Best Games, Vol 2: Games with Black. Trafalgar Square. ISBN 978-3-283-00405-7.
- Korchnoi, Victor (2002). Practical Rook Endings. Olms. ISBN 3-283-00401-3.
- Korchnoi, Victor (2005). My Best Games, Vol 3: Biography. Trafalgar Square. ISBN 978-3-283-00406-4.

=== Korn, Walter ===
- Korn, Walter; Griffith, Richard; Sergeant, Philip Walsingham; White, John Herbert (1946). Modern Chess Openings (7th ed.). Sir Isaac Pitman & Sons.
- Korn, Walter (1952). Modern Chess Openings (8th ed.). Sir Isaac Pitman & Sons.
- Korn, Walter; Collins, John W. (1957). Modern Chess Openings (9th ed.). Sir Isaac Pitman & Sons.
- Korn, Walter; Evans, Larry (1965). Modern Chess Openings (10th ed.). Sir Isaac Pitman & Sons.
- Walter Korn (1972). Modern Chess Openings (11th ed.). Sir Isaac Pitman & Sons.
- Korn, Walter (1978). America's Chess Heritage. David McKay. ISBN 0-679-13200-7.
- Korn, Walter (1982). Modern Chess Openings (12th ed.). A. & C. Black.
- Korn, Walter; de Firmian, Nick (1990). Modern Chess Openings (13th ed.). A. & C. Black.

=== Kosten, Tony ===
- Kosten, Tony (1989). Winning Endgames. Trafalgar Square. ISBN 978-0-946284-69-6.
- Kosten, Tony (1992). Winning with the Philidor. Batsford.
- Kosten, Tony (1995). Latvian Gambit. Henry Holt. ISBN 0-8050-3903-1.
- Kosten, Tony (1998). Mastering the Nimzo-Indian. Batsford. ISBN 0-7134-8383-0.
- Kosten, Tony (1999). The Dynamic English. Gambit Publications. ISBN 978-1-901983-14-2.
- Kosten, Tony; Gormally, Danny (1999). Easy Guide to the Najdorf. Everyman Chess. ISBN 1-85744-529-5.
- Kosten, Tony; Palliser, Richard; Vigus, James (2008). Dangerous Weapons: Flank Openings. Everyman Chess. ISBN 978-1-85744-583-1.

- Kosteniuk, Alexandra (2001). How I became a grandmaster at age 14. Moscow. ISBN 5-8293-0043-5.
- Kosteniuk, Alexandra (2009). Diary of a Chess Queen. Mongoose Press. ISBN 978-0-9791482-7-9.
- Kotov, Alexander; Yudovich, Mikhail (1958). The Soviet School of Chess. Hardinge Simpole (2002 ed.). ISBN 978-1-84382-007-9. (2002 ed.).
- Kotov, Alexander; Keres, Paul (1964). The Art of the Middle Game. Penguin Books.
- Kotov, Alexander (1975). Alexander Alekhine. R.H.M. Press. ISBN 0-89058-007-3.
- Kotronias, Vassilios; Tzermiadianos, Andreas (2005). Beating The Petroff. Batsford. ISBN 978-0-7134-8919-4.
- Kotronias, Vassilios (2011). The Grandmaster Battle Manual. Quality Chess. ISBN 978-1-906552-52-7.
- Kovacevic, Vlatko; Johnsen, Sverre (2005). Win with the London System. Gambit. ISBN 1-904600-35-2.
- Krabbé, Tim (1985). Chess Curiosities. Allen & Unwin. ISBN 0-04-794021-2.
- Kramer, Hans; Euwe, Max (1964). The Middle Game, Book One: Static Features. David Mc Kay (1964 ed.); Hays Publishing (1994 ed.). ISBN 978-1-880673-95-9. (1994 ed.).
- Kramer, Hans; Euwe, Max (1965). The Middle Game, Book Two: Dynamic and Subjective Features. G. Bell (1965 ed.); Hays Publishing (1994 ed.). ISBN 978-1-880673-96-6. (1994 ed.).
- Krogius, Nikolai; Alburt, Lev (1999). Just the Facts!: Winning Endgame Knowledge in One Volume. Newmarket Press. ISBN 978-1-889323-06-0.
- Kuijf, Marinus (1995). Slav: Botvinnik Variation. New In Chess. ISBN 90-71689-80-8.

== L ==
- Cyrus, Lakdawala (2010). Play the London System. Everyman Chess. ISBN 978-1-85744-639-5.
- Cyrus, Lakdawala (2010). A ferocious opening repertoire. Everyman Chess. ISBN 978-1-85744-6616.

=== Lalic, Bogdan ===
- Lalic, Bogdan (1997). The Queen's Indian Defence. Everyman Chess. ISBN 978-1-85744-157-4.
- Lalic, Bogdan (1998). The Budapest Gambit. Batsford. ISBN 978-0-7134-8456-4.
- Lalic, Bogdan (2000). Queen's Gambit Declined: Bg5 Systems. Everyman Chess. ISBN 978-1-85744-240-3.
- Lalic, Bogdan (2002). The Grunfeld for the Attacking Player. Batsford. ISBN 978-0-7134-8166-2.
- Lalic, Bogdan (2003). The Marshall Attack. Everyman Chess. ISBN 978-1-85744-244-1.

- Lamprecht, Franck; Müller, Karsten (2000). Secrets of Pawn Endings. Everyman Chess. ISBN 978-1-85744-255-7.
- Lamprecht, Franck; Müller, Karsten (2001). Fundamental Chess Endings. Gambit Publications. ISBN 1-901983-53-6.

=== Lane, Gary ===
- Lane, Gary (1993). Winning with the Scotch. Henry Holt. ISBN 0-8050-2940-0.
- Lane, Gary (1999). Victory in the Opening. Sterling Pub Co Inc. ISBN 978-0-7134-8427-4.
- Lane, Gary (2001). The Ultimate Colle. Sterling Pub Co Inc. ISBN 978-0-7134-8686-5.
- Lane, Gary (2003). Ideas Behind the Modern Chess Openings: Attacking With White. Batsford. ISBN 978-0-7134-8712-1.
- Lane, Gary (2004). The Bishop's Opening Explained. Batsford. ISBN 0-7134-8917-0.
- Lane, Gary (2005). Ideas Behind Modern Chess Openings: Black. Batsford. ISBN 978-0-7134-8950-7.
- Lane, Gary (2005). The Scotch Game Explained. Batsford. ISBN 0-7134-8940-5.
- Lane, Gary (2006). The Ruy Lopez Explained. Batsford. ISBN 0-7134-8978-2.
- Lane, Gary (2008). The Greatest Ever Chess Tricks and Traps. Everyman Chess. ISBN 978-1-85744-577-0.
- Lane, Gary (2009). Sharpen Your Chess Tactics in 7 Days. Batsford. ISBN 978-1-906388-28-7.
- Lane, Gary (2011). Prepare to Attack. Everyman Chess. ISBN 978-1-85744-650-0.

- Langrock, Hannes (2006). The Modern Morra Gambit. Russell Enterprises. ISBN 1-888690-32-1.
- Larsen, Bent; Levy, David (1972). San Antonio, 1972 : Church's Fried Chicken, Inc. First International Chess Tournament. R.H.M.
- Larsen, Bent (1977). Lærebok i sjakk (in Danish). Dreyer. ISBN 82-09-01480-3.
- Lasker, Edward (1915). Chess Strategy.
- Lasker, Edward (1959). The Adventure of Chess. ISBN 0-486-20510-X.
- Lasker, Emanuel (1896). Common Sense in Chess. Russell Enterprises (2007 ed.). ISBN 978-1-888690-40-8.
- Lasker, Emanuel (1925). Lasker's Manual of Chess. Dover (1960 ed.). ISBN 0-486-20640-8.
- Lasker, Emanuel (1934). Lasker's Chess Primer. Billings (1988 ed.). ISBN 0-7134-6241-8.
- Laven, George; Acers, Jude (2003). The Italian Gambit (and) A Guiding Repertoire for White–1.e4!. Trafford Publishing. ISBN 1-55369-604-2.
- Lawson, David (1976). Paul Morphy: The Pride and Sorrow of Chess. David McKay. ISBN 0-679-13044-6.
- Lawton, Geoff (2003). Tony Miles:It's Only Me. Batsford. ISBN 0-7134-8809-3.
- Lessing, Norman; Saidy, Anthony (1974). The World of Chess. Random House. ISBN 0-394-48777-X.
- Levenfish, Grigory; Smyslov, Vasily (1971). Rook Endings. Chess Digest. ISBN 0-7134-0354-3.
- Levitt, Gerald M. (2000). The Turk, Chess Automaton. McFarland. ISBN 0-7864-0778-6.

=== Levy, David ===
- Levy, David; Larsen, Bent (1972). San Antonio, 1972 : Church's Fried Chicken, Inc. First International Chess Tournament. R.H.M.
- Levy, David (1976). The Sicilian Dragon. Batsford. ISBN 0-19-217571-8.
- Levy, David; O'Connell, Kevin (1981). Oxford Encyclopedia of Chess Games, Volume 1 (1485–1866). Oxford University Press. ISBN 0-19-217571-8.
- Levy, David; O'Connell, Kevin (1987). How to Play the Sicilian Defense. Macmillan Publishers. ISBN 0-02-029191-4.
- Levy, David; Newborn, Monty (1991). How Computers Play Chess. Computer Science Press. ISBN 0-7167-8121-2.
- Levy, David; Keene, Raymond (1993). How to Play the Opening in Chess. ISBN 0-8050-2937-0.

- Li, David H. (1998). The Genealogy of Chess. Premier Publications. ISBN 0-9637852-2-2.
- Lipnitsky, Isaac (2008). Questions of Modern Chess Theory. Quality Chess. ISBN 978-1-906552-03-9.
- Lipschütz, Samuel; Gossip, G.H.D. (1902). The Chess Player's Manual. David McKay.
- Lipton, Michael; Matthews, Robert Charles Oliver; Rice, John (1963). Chess Problems: Introduction to an Art. Faber & Faber.
- Liskov, Barbara (1968). A program to play chess end games. Stanford University Department of Computer Science.
- Liu, Wenzhe (2003). The Chinese School of Chess. Batsford. ISBN 0-7134-8773-9.
- Löhr, Robert (2007). The Chess Machine. Penguin Press. ISBN 978-1-59420-126-4.
- Lombardy, William; Daniels, David (1975). U.S. Championship Chess. David McKay. ISBN 0-679-13042-X.
- Lutes, W. John (1992). Danish Gambit. Chess Enterprises. ISBN 0-945470-19-3.
- Lutz, Christopher (1999). Endgame Secrets: How to plan in the endgame in chess. Batsford. ISBN 0-7134-8165-X.

== See also ==
- List of chess books (A–F)
- List of chess books (M–S)
- List of chess books (T–Z)
- Chess endgame literature
