= Philip Walsingham Sergeant =

British professional writer

Philip W. Sergeant
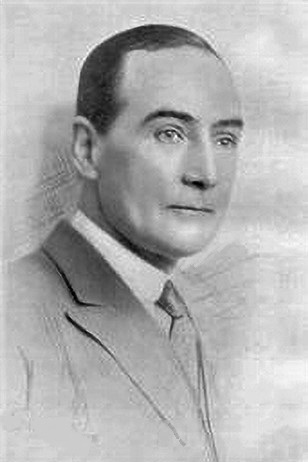

Personal information
- Born: Philip Walsingham Sergeant; 27 January 1872 Notting Hill, London, England
- Died: 20 October 1952 (aged 80) Guildford, England

Chess career
- Country: England

Philip Walsingham Sergeant (27 January 1872, Notting Hill, London – 20 October 1952) was a British professional writer on chess and popular historical subjects. He collaborated on the fifth (1933), sixth (1939), and seventh (1946) editions of Modern Chess Openings, an important reference work on the chess openings. He also wrote biographical game collections of Paul Morphy (Morphy's Games of Chess (1916) and Morphy Gleanings (1932)), Rudolf Charousek (Charousek's Games of Chess (1919)), and Harry Nelson Pillsbury (Pillsbury's Chess Career, with W. H. Watts, 1922), and other important books such as A Century of British Chess (1934) and Championship Chess (1938).

Harry Golombek writes that, "Without any pretensions to mastership, he represented Oxford University in the years 1892-5". Golombek considers A Century of British Chess probably Sergeant's best chess book, but opines that although Sergeant's chess books are lucidly written, they suffer from the defect that, as a non-master, he was not competent to deal with the annotational aspect of his work.

He was a second cousin of Edward Guthlac Sergeant.

== Chess books ==
Sergeant wrote or co-wrote the following chess books. The ISBN, where given, refers to that assigned to a later republication of the book by Dover Publications.

- The Art of Chess Combination: A Guide for All Players of the Game, by Eugene Znosko-Borovsky and Sergeant (translator), David McKay, 1936. OCLC 6068811.
- A Century of British Chess, Hutchinson & Co., London, and David McKay, Philadelphia, 1934. OCLC 1835573, 5785804.
- Championship Chess, 1938. ISBN 0-486-21012-X.
- Charousek's Games of Chess, G. Bell and Sons, 1919. ISBN 0-486-25832-7.
- An Introduction to the Endgame at Chess, Chatto and Windus, London, and David McKay, Philadelphia, 1939. OCLC 3354712.
- Modern Chess Openings (5th ed.), R. C. Griffith and J. H. White, Completely Revised by Sergeant, Griffith, and M. E. Goldstein, published by Whitehead & Miller, 1933.
- Modern Chess Openings (6th ed.), R. C. Griffith and J. H. White, Completely Revised by Reuben Fine, Griffith, and Sergeant, published by Whitehead & Miller, 1939.
- Modern Chess Openings (7th ed.), R. C. Griffith and Sergeant, Completely Revised by W. Korn, published by Sir Isaac Pitman & Sons, 1946.
- Morphy Gleanings, David McKay, 1932. Reprinted by Dover in 1973 as The Unknown Morphy. ISBN 0-486-22952-1.
- Morphy's Games of Chess, G. Bell and Sons. ISBN 0-486-20386-7.
- Pillsbury's Chess Career (with W. H. Watts), American Chess Bulletin, 1922. ISBN 0-486-21543-1.
- The Rice Memorial Chess Tournament, New York, 1916, British Chess Magazine, Leeds, American Chess Bulletin, 1916. OCLC 5634454. OCLC 42985251 (2d ed., British Chess Magazine, 1968).

== Other books ==
Sergeant wrote or co-wrote the following books on subjects other than chess. As in the previous section, the date of earliest known publication is given. The ISBN, where available, refers to that assigned to a later republication of the book.

- Anne Boleyn: A Study, Hutchinson & Co., London, 1923. OCLC 59642584.
- Behind the Scenes at the Court of Vienna : the Private Life of the Emperor of Austria from Information by a Distinguished Personage at Court, by Henri de Weindel and Sergeant, John Long, London, and Musson Book Co., Toronto, 1914. ISBN 978-0-665-98808-0.
- The Burlesque Napoleon; Being the Story of the Life and the Kingship of Jerome Napoleon Bonaparte, Youngest Brother of Napoleon the Great, T.W. Laurie, London, 1905. OCLC 2580051.
- The Cathedral Church of Winchester; a Description of its Fabric and a Brief History of the Episcopal See, G. Bell & Sons, London, 1899. OCLC 228662417.
- Cleopatra of Egypt, Antiquity's Queen of Romance, Hutchinson & Co., London, 1909. OCLC 5659331.
- The Courtships of Catherine the Great, T. Werner Laurie, London, 1905. OCLC 7222919.
- Dominant Women, Hutchinson & Co., London, 1929. ISBN 978-0-8369-1155-8.
- The Empress Josephine, Napoleon's Enchantress, Hutchinson & Co., London 1908. OCLC 5785897.
- Gamblers All, Hutchinson & Co., London, 1931. OCLC 221288958.
- George, Prince and Regent, Hutchinson & Co., London, 1935. OCLC 185186351.
- The Great Empress Dowager of China, Hutchinson & Co., London, 1910. OCLC 2067404.
- Historic British Ghosts, Hutchinson & Co., London, 1936. ISBN 978-0-85409-996-2.
- The Last Empress of the French Being the Life of the Empress Eugenie, Wife of Napoleon III, T.W. Laurie, London; J.B. Lippincott Co., Philadelphia, c. 1907 OCLC 271179572.
- Liars and Fakers, Hutchinson & Co., 1925. OCLC 34331916.
- The Life of Ann Boleyn, Hutchinson & Co., London, 1923. OCLC 9346521.
- Little Jennings and Fighting Dick Talbot: a Life of the Duke and Duchess of Tyrconnel, Hutchinson & Co., London, 1913. OCLC 223214364.
- Mrs. Jordan: Child of Nature, Hutchinson & Co., London, 1913. OCLC 2699596.
- My Lady Castlemaine, Being a Life of Barbara Villiers, Countess of Castlemaine, Afterwards Duchess of Cleveland, D. Estes, Boston, 1911. OCLC 14029496.
- The Princess Mathilde Bonaparte, S. Paul and Co., London, 1915. OCLC 1907037.
- The Real Francis-Joseph, the Private Life of the Emperor of Austria, by Henri de Weindel and Sergeant, J. Long, London, and D. Appleton & Co., New York, 1909. OCLC 3990561.
- Rogues and Scoundrels, Hutchinson & Co., London, 1924. OCLC 2737428.
- The Ruler of Baroda: An Account of the Life and Work of the Maharaja Gaekwar, John Murray, London, 1928. OCLC 228676095.
- Witches and Warlocks, Hutchinson & Co., London, 1936. ISBN 978-0-7158-1028-6.
