= British Chess Magazine =

World's oldest chess journal in continuous publication

- Cover of the September 2022 issue
- Editors: Milan Dinic and Shaun Taulbut
- Staff writers: Luke McShane, David Howell, Nick Pert, Andrew Martin, Yang-Fan Zhou, and Gary Lane
- Photographer: David Llada
- Frequency: Monthly
- Circulation: 1,200+
- Publisher: British Chess Magazine Ltd.
- Founder: John Watkinson
- Founded: 1881
- First issue: January 1881
- Company: British Chess Magazine Ltd.
- Country: United Kingdom
- Based in: Wokingham, Berkshire, England
- Language: English
- Website: www.britishchessmagazine.co.uk
- ISSN: 0007-0440

British Chess Magazine (BCM) is the world's oldest chess journal in continuous publication. First published in January 1881, it has appeared at monthly intervals ever since. While Le Palamède was the world's first chess periodical, it ceased publication in 1847.

The founder and first general editor of the magazine was John Watkinson (1833–1923). He had previously edited the Huddersfield College Magazine, which was the British Chess Magazine's forerunner. From its inception, the magazine was devoted to the coverage of chess worldwide, and not just in Great Britain.

BCM is an independent and privately owned magazine; it is not owned or run by the former British Chess Federation (now the English Chess Federation), with which its name was occasionally confused, apart from the period August 1981 – July 1992.

In January 2016, the publication underwent an editorial and visual redesign and entered into a content collaboration with Chess Informant.

== General editors ==
Editor	Tenure	Notes / credentials
John Watkinson (1833–1923)	1881–1887	Founding editor
Robert Frederick Green (1856–1925)	1888–1893	
Isaac McIntyre Brown (1858–1934)	1894–1920	
Richard Clewin Griffith (1872–1955)	1920–1937, 1940	Returned for several months in 1940
Harry Golombek (1911–1995)	1938–1940	International Master (IM)
Julius du Mont (1881–1956)	1940–1949	
Brian Patrick Reilly (1901–1991)	1949–1981	
Bernard Cafferty (1934-2026)	1981–1991	FIDE Master (FM)
Murray Chandler (born 1960)	1991–1999	International Grandmaster (GM)
John Saunders (born 1953)	1999 – August 2010	
Steve Giddins (born 1961)	September 2010 – April 2011	FIDE Master (FM)
James Pratt (born 1959), John Upham (born 1960), and Shaun Taulbut (born 1958)	May 2011 – December 2015	Co-editors; Taulbut is an International Master (IM)
Jimmy Adams (born 1947) and Josip Asik (born 1969)	January 2016 – October 2016	Co-editors; both FIDE Masters (FM)
Milan Dinic (born 1986)	November 2016 – present	

== Notable columnists and contributors ==
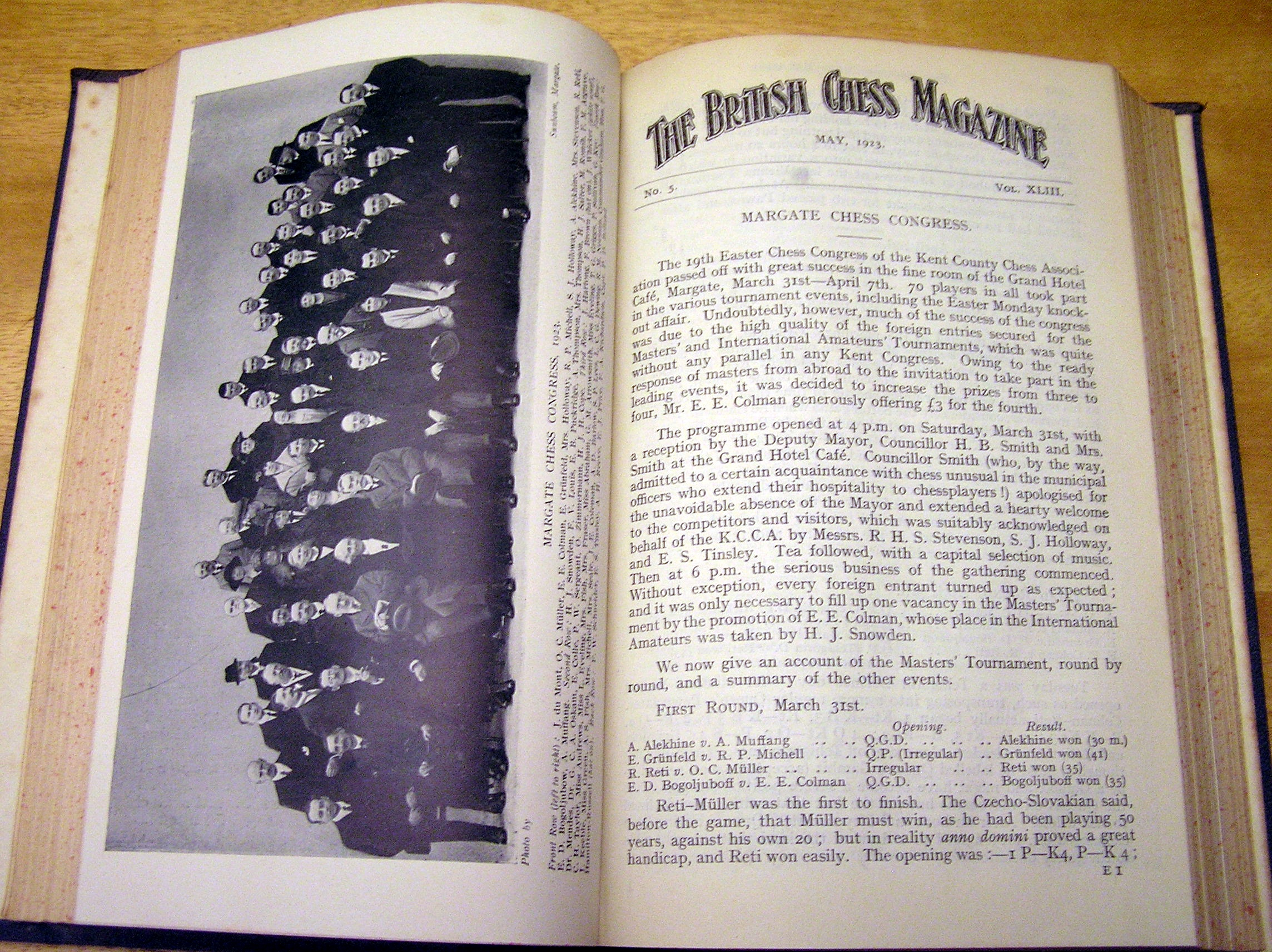
British Chess Magazine, 1923

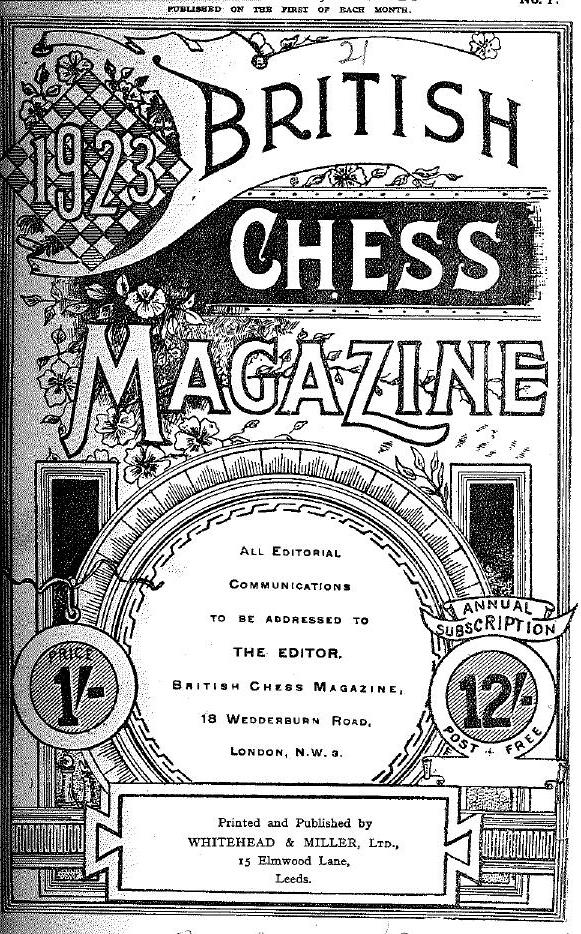
Cover of a 1923 issue

Throughout its history, BCM has featured numerous regular columnists and analysts:

=== History and trivia ===
- D. J. Morgan: Wrote the "Quotes and Queries" column from 1953 to 1978.
- Kenneth Whyld: Wrote the "Quotes and Queries" column from 1978 until his death in 2003; a memorial association was founded in his honour.
- Christopher Ravilious: Wrote the "Quotes and Queries" column from 2003 until autumn 2009.
- Phil Hughes: Wrote the "Quotes and Queries" column until 2010; subsequently a regular contributor specializing in Nimzowitsch.
- Alan A. Smith: From January 2011, writes the "Quotes and Queries" column.
- Richard Nevil Coles: Wrote the "One Hundred Years Ago" column, examining Victorian chess history.
- John S. Hilbert: In 2011, wrote the "Past Practices" historical column.
- Chris Fordham-Hall: From May 2013, writes the "All Our Yesterdays" historical column.
- Dan Scoones: From May 2014, writes the "Forgotten Master" historical profile series.

=== Endgame studies and compositions ===
- A. John Roycroft: Wrote the "Studies" column.
- Charles Michael Bent: Wrote the "Studies" column from January 1975 until 1985.
- John Beasley: Wrote the "Endgame Studies" column for approximately twenty years until 2010.
- Ian R. Watson: From 2010 onwards, writes the "Endgame Studies" column and reviews new books.
- Christopher John Feather: Wrote the "Problem World" column.
- David Friedgood: FIDE Master Friedgood wrote the "Problem World" column from 1992 until his retirement in 2011.
- Christopher Jones: From November 2011, Composition GM Jones writes the "Problems" column and contributes book reviews.

=== Game analysis and instruction ===
- William Hartston: English International Master; former games editor.
- Sam Collins: Irish International Master; former games editor.
- Jonathan Speelman: English Grandmaster; wrote the advanced technical column "Speelman on the Endgame".
- Andrew Martin: International Master; from September 2011, writes the "Games Department" column and presents the magazine's video channel.
- David Howell: Grandmaster; from June 2012, writes the "Game of the Month" column.
- Nick Pert: Grandmaster; from October 2011, writes the "Endgames for Experts" column.
- Gary Lane: International Master; from August 2012, writes the "Chess Questions Answered" column.
- Shaun Taulbut: International Master and magazine co-editor; writes the "Test Your Chess" column.
- Edward J. Dearing: International Master; from summer 2011, writes "Dearing's Discoveries", focusing on opening theory.
- Pete Tamburro: From June 2014, writes the "Openings for Amateurs" column.
- Alan Dommett: From 2011, writes the "Practical Play" column, featuring openings such as the Blackmar–Diemer Gambit.
- Carl Gorka: From 2011, wrote the "Endgames for Learners" column from Australia.
- William Ritson-Morry: Wrote the "Posers in Play" instructional column.
- Peter C. Griffiths: Wrote the "Practical Chess Endings" column.
- John E. Upham: Co-editor; writes the "Spot the Continuation" column and serves as a photographer.

=== General contributors, reviews, and reporting ===
- Lubos Kavalek: US Grandmaster; authored the commentary column "Kavalek File".
- Ian Rogers: Australian Grandmaster; active on-the-spot tournament reporter during Murray Chandler's and John Saunders' tenure, with photography by Cathy Rogers.
- Yang-Fan Zhou: International Master; featured as a guest columnist from September 2013.
- Samuel Gideon Franklin: FIDE Master; from 2011, writes the "Sam at the Back" commentary column.
- Kenneth Brian Harman: Correspondence IM; wrote the "Correspondence Chess" column from 2011 to spring 2012.
- Alex McFarlane: International Arbiter; from November 2011, writes the "Ask the Arbiter" column; he has officiated at the Candidates level.
- Adam Raoof: From October 2011, wrote the "Brits Abroad" tournament reporting column.
- Peter Arthur Williams: From autumn 2011, writes the "Peter Principle" column on the website as one of the UK's youngest chess journalists.
- Adam Hunt: International Master and chess coach; reviews chess media and software.
- Tom Rendle: International Master; from 2012, contributes regular reports on the 4NCL and domestic tournaments.
- John Cox: International Master; from 2012, contributes detailed literature reviews.
- Julian M. Way: FIDE Master; occasional contributor writing on opening theory and pitfalls in lines such as the Queen's Gambit Declined.
- Andrew P. Smith: FIDE Master; from July 2012, writes the "Offbeat Chess" column.
- Julian (Gyula) Meszaros: From July 2013, authored the series "Analogy on the Chessboard".
- Theo Slade: From August 2013, wrote "The Shock of the New" column starting at age twelve.
- Carl Portman: From October 2013, conducts the interview series "In the Spotlight".
- A. Tyson Mordue: FIDE Master; from November 2014, writes the commentary column "Club Knight".
- Davide Nastasio: From February 2015, regular DVD and media reviewer.
- Noam Manella: From March 2015, writes the "Hacktive Chess" column.
- Tamas Fodor: Hungarian Grandmaster; from April 2015, writes the "Fodor at the Front" commentary column.
- Mark A. Jordan: From June 2015, writes the tournament coverage column "Congress Diary".

=== Historical contributors and feature writers ===
- Jacques Mieses: Contributed regularly during his English exile (1939–1953), including annotated tournament reports from Hastings and Margate, and an obituary for Emanuel Lasker in March 1941.
- Geoffrey Harber Diggle: Prolific historical feature writer.
- Harry Golombek: International Master and prominent feature writer.
- Edward G. Winter: Chess historian and analytical article contributor.
- Nigel Short: Grandmaster; contributes analytical theoretical articles.
- James Plaskett: Grandmaster; contributes analytical articles and commentary from Spain.

== Regular content ==
The magazine typically includes:

- Editorial
- Media news
- News from the British Isles
- News from abroad
- Local (UK) news
- Game of the Month
- Spot the Continuation
- Test Your Chess with IM Shaun Taulbut
- Problem World
- Studies
- New books and DVDs reviewed
- Correspondence chess

== Associated publications ==
BCM has published two extensive series of supplementary volumes and monographs alongside the main periodical.

=== B.C.M. Quarterly ===
1. The 24th U.S.S.R. Chess Championship, Peter Hugh Clarke
2. 1958 Interzonal Tournament, Portorož, August–September, 1958 (1958). OCLC 43893823
3. 4th Candidates' Tournament 1959, Harold Golombek
4. Hastings 1960–1961 International Tournament
5. Around the Chess World in 80 Years—Volume 1, Nathan Divinsky
6. 1930 Scarborough International Tournament, Harold Golombek (1962)
7. 31st U.S.S.R. Chess Championships, 1963 (1963)
8. Around the Chess World in 80 Years—Volume 2, Nathan Divinsky (1965)
9. Bognor Regis International Congress 1965, J. N. Fishlock-Lomax (1968)
10. Mir Sultan Khan: All-India Champion 1928, British Champion 1929–1932–1933, Richard Nevil Coles (1968)
11. Boris Spassky's Road to the Summit, William Harold Cozens (1968)
12. The Ben-Oni Defence, Emil Gelenczei (1966)
13. Flank Openings, Raymond Keene (1970). ISBN 978-0-900846-03-8
14. 5th World Correspondence Chess Championships, Hans Berliner and Ken Messere (1971). ISBN 978-0-900846-05-2
15. Counter Gambits, Black to Play and Win, Timothy D. Harding (1974). ISBN 978-0-900846-13-7
16. Tal Since 1960, William Harold Cozens (1974). ISBN 978-0-900846-18-2
17. Staunton, the English World Champion, Raymond Keene and Richard Nevil Coles (1976). ISBN 978-0-900846-19-9
18. The Book of the Havana International Masters' Tournament 1913, José Raúl Capablanca (1976)
19. Mir Sultan Khan, Richard Nevil Coles (1977). ISBN 978-0-900846-25-0
20. London 1982: The Phillips and Drew Kings Tournament, Raymond Keene (1982). ISBN 978-0-900846-38-0
21. London 1927: The "British Empire Club" International Tournament, Raymond Keene (1983). ISBN 978-0-900846-40-3
22. The Lost Olympiad: Stockholm 1937, William Harold Cozens (1985). ISBN 978-0-900846-43-4

=== B.C.M. Classic Reprints ===
1. The Grand International Masters' Chess Tournament at St. Petersburg, 1914 (c. 1960s; reprint of 1914 edition)
2. London 1899 International Tournament (c. 1960s; reprint of 1900 edition)
3. Der Internationale Kongress Paris 1878 (c. 1960s; reprint of 1879 edition)
4. London 1862 (c. 1960s; reprint of 1864 edition)
5. Leipzig 1877 Schachkongress, Emil Schallopp (c. 1960s; reprint of 1878 edition)
6. The Game and Playe of the Chesse 1474, William Caxton (1968). ISBN 978-0-900846-00-7
7. Wien 1873: Der Erste Wiener Internationale Schachkongress 1873, Lehner and Schwede (c. 1960s; reprint of 1874 edition)
8. New York 1916 Rice Memorial Tournament, Philip Walsingham Sergeant (c. 1960s; reprint of 1916 edition)
9. Karlsbad 1911, Milan Vidmar (1970; reprint of 1911 edition)
10. Coburg 1904 Kongress, Schellenberg, Schlechter and Marco (1972). ISBN 978-0-900846-06-9
11. The Games Played in the London International Chess Tournament 1883, James Innes Minchin (1973). ISBN 978-0-900846-08-3
12. A.V.R.O. 1938 Chess Tournament (1973). ISBN 978-0-900846-10-6
13. Deux Cents Parties d'Échecs, Alexander Alekhine: volume one (1973), ISBN 978-0-900846-11-3; volume two (1979), ISBN 978-0-900846-29-8
14. Die Schacholympiade von Hamburg 1930, F. Chalupetzky and L. Tóth (1973). ISBN 978-0-900846-12-0
15. Das Internationale Schachturnier Nürnberg 1896, Siegbert Tarrasch and Chr. Schröder (1974). ISBN 978-0-900846-15-1
16. Das Internationale Schachturnier Baden-Baden 1925, Siegbert Tarrasch (1975). ISBN 978-0-900846-16-8
17. Das Champion-Turnier zu Ostende 1907, Siegbert Tarrasch (1975). ISBN 0-900846-21-6
18. Das Internationale Schachturnier Karlsbad 1923, Bernhard Kagan (1977). ISBN 978-0-900846-26-7
19. Mährisch-Ostrau 1923 Internationales Schachmeister-Turnier, Bernhard Kagan (1978). ISBN 978-0-900846-27-4
20. World Chess Championship 1948, Harold Golombek (1982). ISBN 978-0-900846-35-9
21. Bad Kissingen 1928, Savielly Tartakower (c. 1970s; reprint of 1928 edition). ISBN 978-0-900846-37-3
22. 1923–1932 An Anthology, Bernard Cafferty (1986). ISBN 978-0-900846-45-8

=== Other publications ===
- Capablanca's Hundred Best Games of Chess, Harold Golombek (1995; reprint of 1947 edition). ISBN 978-0-900846-50-2
- B.C.M. Guide to the Openings in 178 Games, Francis Joseph Young ("Hobart") (1898)
- Selection of Chess Problems by Philipp Klett, Philipp Klett; J. D. Beasley (ed.) (1978). ISBN 978-0-900846-30-4
- Mattison's Chess Endgame Studies, T. G. Whitworth (1987). ISBN 978-0-900846-47-2

== See also ==
- List of chess periodicals

== Bibliography ==
- Giddins, Steve (December 2010). "Bernard Cafferty – 30 years at his post!". British Chess Magazine: 622–625. ISSN 0007-0440.
- Diggle, Geoffrey Harber (January 1955). "The BCM – A Reader's Retrospect". British Chess Magazine: 34–36. ISSN 0007-0440.
- Reilly, Freddy (December 1980). "Our First Hundred Years 1881–1980". British Chess Magazine: 593–626. ISSN 0007-0440.
- Saunders, John (April 2005). "[Editorial]". British Chess Magazine: 204–205. ISSN 0007-0440.
- Golombek, Harry (1977). The Encyclopedia of Chess. Batsford. ISBN 0-7134-0878-2.
- Hooper, David; Whyld, Kenneth (1984). The Oxford Companion to Chess. Oxford University Press. ISBN 0-19-217540-8.
