= Modern Chess Openings =

Reference book first published in 1911

Fifteenth edition (2008)

Modern Chess Openings (usually called MCO) is a reference book on chess openings, first published in 1911 by the British players Richard Clewin Griffith (1872–1955) and John Herbert White (1880–1920). The fifteenth edition was published in 2008. Harry Golombek called it "the first scientific study of the openings in the twentieth century".

== History ==
Although Bilguer's Handbuch des Schachspiels was more authoritative at the time MCO was first published, it was last published between 1912 and 1916, and was becoming outdated by the 1930s. MCO was popular with English-speaking players and has continued to be updated throughout the 20th century and into the 21st, with fifteen editions from 1911 through 2008. Early editions were small enough to fit in a pocket (the first edition was 190 pages), but later editions grew and the fifteenth and most recent version is 768 pages. In 1977, Harry Golombek said "The work became popular at once and for over forty years was regarded as the main book on the openings throughout the world."

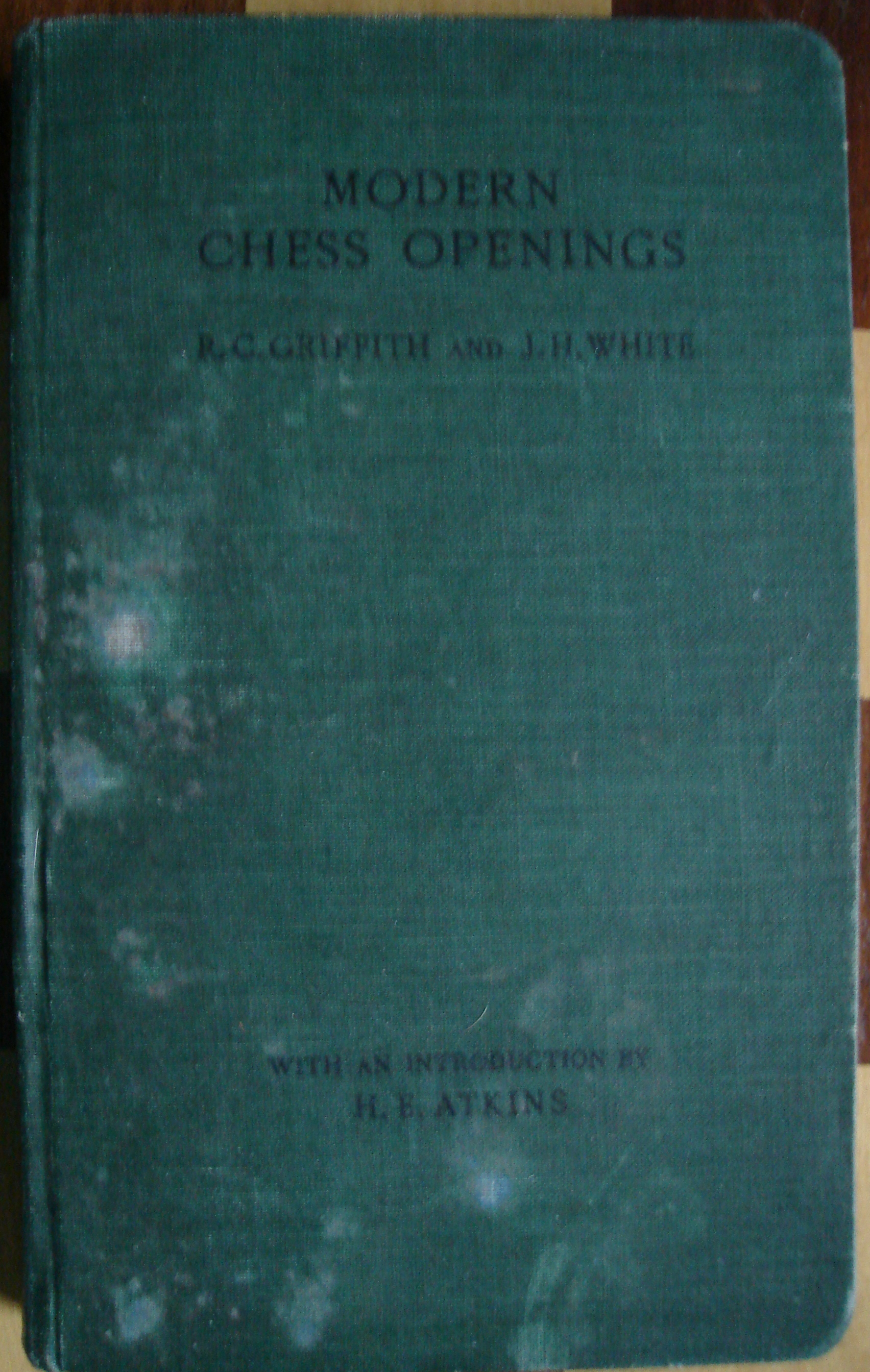
Worn copy of second edition (1913)

The first three editions (1911, 1913, and 1916) were the work of Griffith (who won the 1912 British Championship) and White, with an introduction by Henry Ernest Atkins. Editions through at least 1946 continued to be attributed to Griffith and White, with P. W. Sergeant and Maurice Edward Goldstein providing revisions starting with the fourth edition in 1925. In 1939, Reuben Fine, who had won the AVRO tournament the year before, edited MCO. Fine was not able to work on subsequent editions of MCO, so in 1948 he wrote Practical Chess Openings. As Practical Chess Openings was not revised in any further editions, MCO remained the most popular English language opening reference.

American Walter Korn worked on the seventh through thirteenth editions, assuming editorship starting with MCO-8 in 1952. Korn was assisted on certain editions by Jack Collins, Larry Evans, and Nick de Firmian; Evans and de Firmian have held the U.S. Championship. The first twelve editions used descriptive notation to record the moves, and only with MCO-13 in 1990 did the series begin to use the now-standard algebraic notation. The most recent edition, MCO-15 in 2008, was written and edited by de Firmian.

A worn copy of the tenth edition (1965)

Since 1980, there have been other one-volume opening encyclopedias to rival MCO: Batsford Chess Openings (BCO) in 1982 and 1989, and Nunn's Chess Openings (NCO) in 1999. John Watson wrote that MCO-13 "really isn't up to modern expectations", but called MCO-14 "a vast improvement over its predecessor No. 13 in almost every respect" and comparable in quality to NCO.

== Editions ==
Edition	Year	Authors	Publisher
1	1911	R. C. Griffith and J. H. White, with an introduction by H. E. Atkins	British Chess Magazine
2	1913	R. C. Griffith and J. H. White, with an introduction by H. E. Atkins	Longmans, Green & Co.
3	1916	R. C. Griffith and J. H. White	Longmans, Green & Co.
4	1925	R. C. Griffith and J. H. White, completely revised by R. C. Griffith, M. E. Goldstein, and P. W. Sergeant	Whitehead & Miller
5	1932	R. C. Griffith and J. H. White, completely revised by P. W. Sergeant, R. C. Griffith, and M. E. Goldstein	Whitehead & Miller
6	1939	R. C. Griffith and J. H. White, completely revised by Reuben Fine, R. C. Griffith, and P. W. Sergeant	Whitehead & Miller
7	1946	R. C. Griffith and J. H. White, completely revised by Walter Korn under the editorship of R. C. Griffith and P. W. Sergeant	Sir Isaac Pitman & Sons
8	1952	edited and completely revised by Walter Korn	Sir Isaac Pitman & Sons
9	1957	completely revised by Walter Korn and John W. Collins	Sir Isaac Pitman & Sons
10	1965	completely revised by Larry Evans under the editorship of Walter Korn	Sir Isaac Pitman & Sons
11	1972	Walter Korn	Sir Isaac Pitman & Sons
12	1982	Walter Korn	A. & C. Black
13	1990	Walter Korn, revised by Nick de Firmian	A. & C. Black
14	1999	completely revised by Nick de Firmian	David McKay
15	2008	completely revised by Nick de Firmian	Random House

== Quotations ==
- "... the most important single book in world chess literature". – American Chess Correspondent, writing about the tenth edition.

== See also ==
- Opening book
- List of chess openings
