= Adriaan de Groot =

Dutch chess player and psychologist

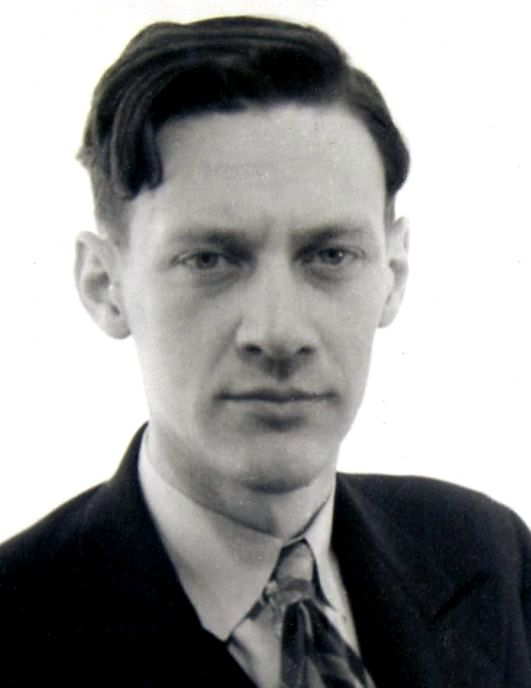
Adrianus Dingeman de Groot

Adrianus Dingeman (Adriaan) de Groot (Santpoort, 26 October 1914 – Schiermonnikoog, 14 August 2006) was a Dutch chess master and psychologist, who conducted some of the most famous chess experiments of all time in the 1940s-60. In 1946 he wrote his thesis Het denken van den schaker, which in 1965 was translated into English and published as Thought and choice in chess. De Groot played for the Netherlands in the Chess Olympiads of 1937 and 1939. In 1973 he became member of the Royal Netherlands Academy of Arts and Sciences.

== Study of chess players ==
The studies involve participants of all chess backgrounds, from amateurs to masters. They investigate the cognitive requirements and the thought processes involved in moving a chess piece. The participants were usually required to solve a given chess problem correctly under the supervision of an experimenter and represent their thought-processes vocally so that they could be recorded.

De Groot found that much of what is important in choosing a move occurs during the first few seconds of exposure to a new position. Four stages in the task of choosing the next move were noted. The first stage was the 'orientation phase', in which the subject assessed the situation and determined a very general idea of what to do next. The second stage, the 'exploration phase' was manifested by looking at some branches of the game tree. The third stage, or 'investigation phase' resulted in the subject choosing a probable best move. Finally, in the fourth stage, the 'proof phase', saw the subject confirming with him/herself that the results of the investigation were valid.

De Groot concurred with Alfred Binet that visual memory and visual perception are important attributors and that problem-solving ability is of paramount importance. Memory is particularly important, according to de Groot (1965), in that there are no ‘new’ moves in chess, so those from personal experience (or from the experience of others) can be committed to memory.

== Publications ==
- Thought and choice in chess (1965).
- Saint Nicholas, A psychoanalytic study of his history and myth (1965).
- Methodology. Foundations of inference and research in the behavioral sciences (1969).
- Perception and memory in chess: Heuristics of the professional eye (1996; with Fernand Gobet and Riekent Jongman).
