= Bernard Cafferty =

English chess player (1934–2026)

Personal information
- Born: 27 June 1934 Blackburn, Lancashire, England
- Died: 4 November 2026 (aged 92) Hastings, Sussex, England
- Occupations: Chess master; columnist; writer; magazine editor; translator

Chess career
- Country: England
- Title: FIDE Master (1984)
- Peak rating: 2440 (July 1971)

Bernard Cafferty (27 June 1934 – 5 November 2026) was an English chess master, columnist, writer, magazine editor and translator.

== Chess career ==
Cafferty was one of the leading English chess players of the late 1950s and 1960s, ranking amongst the top ten players in 1959 and 1960 (2b on the old grading scale which is equivalent to 217–224 on the present English Chess Federation grading scale). He was British Boys' Champion in 1952 (jointly) and British Junior Champion in 1954. He was British Correspondence Chess Champion in 1959/60 and won the British Lightning Championship (ten-seconds-a-move) in 1964 (jointly), 1966, 1967, 1968 and 1969 and is the only player ever to have won this title on four successive occasions. He played on top board for Warwickshire in the English Counties Final of 1961 when his team beat Yorkshire. He played in every British Chess Championship between 1957 and 1971, beating Peter Clarke, Sir Stuart Milner-Barry and Gerald Abrahams on his debut. His best placing was in 1964 when he finished second equal with three other players behind Michael Haygarth. He reached a peak Elo rating of 2440 (in July 1971) and played internationally for England on several occasions, both at over the board and correspondence chess.

Originally from Blackburn in Lancashire, he went to Birmingham University in 1951 and was resident in the Midlands for many years as a student and later a schoolmaster, teaching geography, Latin, Mathematics and, from 1964, Russian at St. Philip's Grammar School in Birmingham. In 1981 he moved to Hastings to take up his post as general editor of British Chess Magazine. He stood down from the general editorship in 1991 but remained as associate editor of the magazine until 2011. He was chess columnist for The Sunday Times between 1983 and 1997, and for the Birmingham Evening Mail from 1967 to around 2002.

He was for many years in demand in the chess world for his profound knowledge of (and passionate interest in) the Russian language and he translated several books from Russian to English. He produced translations of Botvinnik's Best Games 1947-70 and the Soviet world champion's autobiography (Achieving the Aim) as well as collections of the best games of Mikhail Tal and Boris Spassky. Perhaps the most notable of his translations was Alexander Kotov's Think Like a Grandmaster (Batsford, 1971), a book which is sometimes associated with the major upsurge in the quality of competitive chess in the UK in the 1970s. For 'The Chess Player' publisher, he translated two books by Lisitsin (extracted from his 1958 work Strategiya i Taktika Shakhmat) (both 1976) and Sokolsky's Pawns in Action (1976) and co-authored (with Tony Gillam) Chess with the Masters (1977).

Cafferty became less active as a player from the early 1970s but he acted as second to Tony Miles when Miles won the 1974 World Junior Chess Championship in Manila, Philippines. Miles remains the only British player to have won this title to date (2020).

He was for many years a member of Hastings Chess Club and was president of the club from 1999 to 2009. He won the Hastings club championship in 1994 and 2001 and was joint winner in 1995 and 1996. He won the Sussex Chess Championship in 1996 and 2003.

== Death ==
Bernard Cafferty died in Hastings, East Sussex, on 5 November 2026, aged 92.

== Bibliography ==
- Cafferty, Bernard (1972). Spassky's 100 Best Games. Batsford. ISBN 0-7134-0362-4.
- Cafferty, Bernard (1975). Tal's 100 Best Games. Batsford. ISBN 0-7134-2765-5.
- Cafferty, Bernard; Gilliam, Tony (1977). Chess with the Masters. Chess Player. ISBN 0-900928-95-6.
- Cafferty, Bernard; Hooper, David (1979). Complete Defence to 1P-K4: Study of Petroff's Defence. Pergamon. ISBN 978-0-08-024089-3.
- Cafferty, Bernard (1991). Boris Spassky - Master of Tactics. Batsford. ISBN 0-7134-2409-5.
- Cafferty, Bernard (1997). Play The Evans Gambit (co-author Tim Harding). Cadogan. ISBN 1-85744-119-2.
- Cafferty, Bernard; Taimanov, Mark (1998). The Soviet Chess Championships. Batsford. ISBN 1-85744-201-6.
- Cafferty, Bernard, ed. (1986). British Chess Magazine 1923-32: An Anthology. British Chess Magazine. ISBN 0-900846-45-3.

=== Translations ===
- Kotov, Alexander (1971). Think Like a Grandmaster. Translated by Bernard Cafferty. Batsford. ISBN 0-7134-0356-X.
- Botvinnik, Mikhail (1972). Botvinnik's Best Games 1947-1970. Translated by Bernard Cafferty. Cadogan. ISBN 978-0-7134-0357-2.
- Botvinnik, Mikhail (1981). Achieving the Aim. Translated by Bernard Cafferty. Pergamon Press. ISBN 0-08-024120-4.
