= Johan Hellsten =

Swedish chess grandmaster (born 1975)

Personal information
- Born: 25 December 1975 (age 50) Malmö, Sweden

Chess career
- Country: Sweden
- Title: Grandmaster (2004)
- FIDE rating: 2550 (July 2026)
- Peak rating: 2592 (October 2006)

Johan Hellsten (born 25 December 1975) is a Swedish chess grandmaster. He was Swedish Chess Champion in 2006.

== Chess career ==
Born in 1975, Hellsten earned his international master title in 1995 and his grandmaster title in 2004. In 2006, he won the Swedish Chess Championship. He played for Sweden in the Chess Olympiads of 1996, 2004 and 2006 and in the European Team Chess Championships of 1997, 2003 and 2005. He tied for second–sixth with Laurent Fressinet, Vladimir Baklan, Robert Fontaine and Erik van den Doel in the Abihome Open 2000 and tied for first with Dmitry Svetushkin and Marcin Szymański in the Ikaros Chess Festival 2003. As of the July 2020 rating FIDE list, he has an Elo rating of 2550, making him the No. 4 ranked Swedish player, though he is inactive. Hellsten was champion in the chess tournament "Semana Valdiviana", Chile, 2002.

== Bibliography ==
- Hellsten, Johan (2008). Play the Sicilian Kan. Everyman Chess. ISBN 9781857445817.
- Hellsten, Johan (2010). Mastering Chess Strategy. Everyman Chess. ISBN 9781857446487.
- Hellsten, Johan (2012). Mastering Opening Strategy. Everyman Chess. ISBN 9781857446920.
- Hellsten, Johan (2013). Mastering Endgame Strategy. Everyman Chess. ISBN 9781781940181.
- Hellsten, Johan (2025). Mastering Chess Defence. New in Chess. ISBN 9789083483429.
