= Steve Giddins =

English chess player and writer (born 1961)

Personal information
- Born: Stephen William Giddins; 29 January 1961 (age 65)

Chess career
- Country: England
- Title: FIDE Master (1990)
- Peak rating: 2376 (January 1999)

Stephen Giddins (born 29 January 1961) is an English chess player and writer. He graduated from Keble College, Oxford, in Philosophy, Politics and Economics in 1982. He went on to become a FIDE Master and wrote a number of chess books, some of which have also been translated into German and Spanish.

He was the editor of British Chess Magazine from September 2010 to April 2011.

== Books ==
- 101 Chess Opening Traps, 1998
- How to Build Your Chess Opening Repertoire, 2003
- 50 Essential Chess Lessons, 2006
- 101 Chess Endgame Tips: golden nuggets of endgame wisdom, 2007
- 50 Ways to Win at Chess, 2008
- The Greatest Ever Chess Endgames. Everyman Chess. 2012. ISBN 978-1-85744-694-4.
