= Raymond Keene =

English chess grandmaster (born 1948)

Raymond Keene OBE
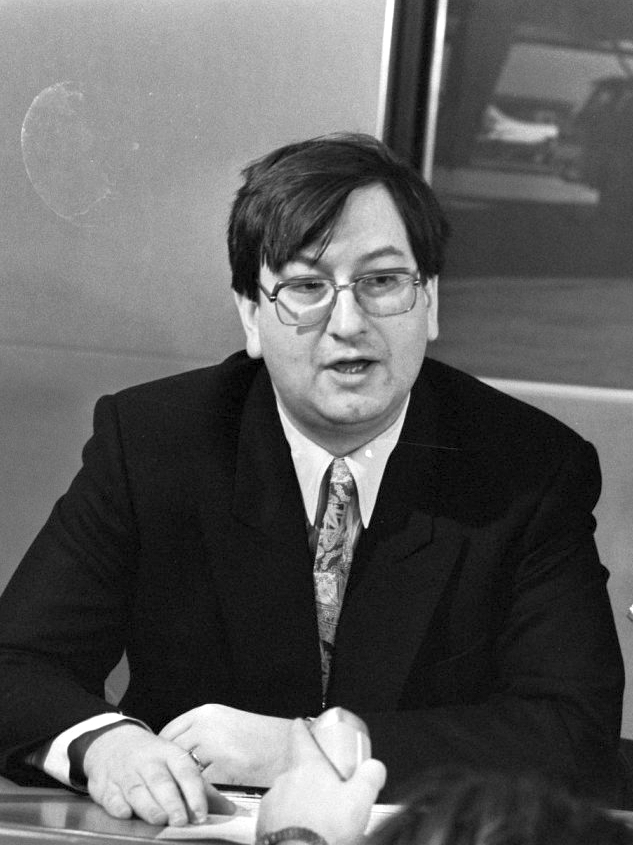
- Keene in 1985

Personal information
- Born: Raymond Dennis Keene; 29 January 1948 (age 78) London, England

Chess career
- Country: England
- Title: Grandmaster (1976)
- Peak rating: 2510 (January 1977)
- Peak ranking: No. 66 (January 1982)

Raymond Dennis Keene (born 29 January 1948) is an English chess grandmaster, FIDE administrator, journalist and author. He won the British Chess Championship in 1971 and was the first player from England to earn a Grandmaster norm, in 1974, at the Nice Olympiad. In 1976, he became the second Englishman to be awarded the Grandmaster title and the second British chess player to beat an incumbent World Chess Champion. He represented England in eight Chess Olympiads.

Keene retired from competitive play in 1986 at the age of 38 and is now better known as an administrator, columnist and author. He was involved in organising the 1986, 1993 and 2000 World Chess Championships; and the 1997, 1998 and 1999 Mind Sports Olympiads, all held in London. Keene was the chess correspondent of The Times from 1985 to November 2019 and is a prolific author, having written over 200 books on chess and mind games. He was appointed an Officer of the Order of the British Empire (OBE) for services to chess in the 1985 Birthday Honours.

== Chess career ==
Keene won the London and British Under 18 Championships (shared with Brian Denman) in 1964, and represented England at the 1965 and 1967 World Junior Chess Championships, held in Barcelona and Jerusalem respectively. At the latter event he took the silver medal, finishing behind Julio Kaplan. He was educated at Dulwich College and Trinity College, Cambridge (where he studied modern languages and graduated with an MA). Keene wrote his first chess book whilst studying at Cambridge, and won the British Chess Championship at Blackpool 1971. As a result, he was awarded the International Master title in 1972, the first English player to achieve this since Jonathan Penrose in 1961. In 1974, Keene married Annette, the sister of International Master David S. Goodman. They have one son, Alexander, born in 1991.

Keene was the second British player to meet the necessary requirements to become a Grandmaster. He earned his second GM norm (thus becoming qualified for the title) at the 1976 Haifa Olympiad; but Tony Miles had scored his own second norm a few months earlier in 1976, thus becoming the first British Grandmaster. Both Keene and Miles won financial prizes for this feat.

Miles and Keene were at the forefront of the English chess explosion of the next 20 years, and they were followed by other British Grandmasters such as Michael Stean, John Nunn, Jon Speelman and Jonathan Mestel.

Keene represented England for nearly two decades in international team events, beginning with the 1966 Chess Olympiad in Havana when he was 18. He followed with the next seven straight Olympiads: Lugano 1968, Siegen 1970, Skopje 1972, Nice 1974, Haifa 1976, Buenos Aires 1978, and La Valletta 1980. His individual performances at Lugano and Haifa merited bronze medals (although individual medals were not, in fact, awarded at Haifa) and he was undefeated in three Olympiads – these two and Siegen. His later performances, though, were less impressive, with just two draws from four games at Buenos Aires and losses in both his games at La Valletta.

He represented England four times at the Students' Olympiad (Örebro 1966, Harrachov 1967, Ybbs 1968 and Dresden 1969) and four times at the European Team Championships (Bath 1973, Moscow 1977, Skara 1980 and Plovdiv 1983). At Skara he won both a bronze medal with the team and the individual gold medal for the best score on his board.

Keene won the 1971 British championship and shared second place on three occasions, in 1968, 1970 and 1972. His tournament victories include Hastings Challengers 1966, Slater Challenge Southend 1968, Johannesburg 1973, Woolacombe 1973, Capablanca Memorial (Master Group) 1974, Alicante 1977, Sydney 1979, Dortmund 1980, Barcelona 1980, Lloyds Bank Masters 1981, Adelaide 1983 and La Valletta 1985.

=== Playing style ===
Keene's playing style tended toward the strategically original and positional. Strongly influenced by Aron Nimzowitsch and Richard Réti, he accordingly preferred hypermodern openings such as the Modern Defence, Nimzo-Indian Defence and King's Indian Defence.

== Chess-related work ==
=== Organiser ===
Keene worked as a chess event organiser. He was the originator and organiser of the annual Staunton memorial chess tournaments, one of the few regular events for masters held in London. The Oxford Companion comments: "By a combination of ability and shrewdness, Keene has attracted considerable sponsorship and has proved himself capable of efficient and rapid organisation of chess events".^{p196}

Keene brought Victor Korchnoi and Garry Kasparov together for their 1983 Candidates' semi-final match in London as part of the 1984 World Championship cycle; the semi-final match between Vasily Smyslov and Zoltán Ribli was also played at the same site. He organised the 1984 Russia (USSR) vs Rest of the World match in London within two weeks, enabling the event to go ahead on time after the previous plans had fallen through, described by John Nunn as "a magnificent organisational achievement at such short notice."

Keene has also been involved in organising several World Championship finals matches. He arranged for the first half of the World Chess Championship 1986 return match between Kasparov and Karpov in London. The match, however, made a loss for the British Chess Federation (BCF) and, for reasons never clarified, he resigned from his position in the BCF shortly afterwards. He organised the 1993 PCA World Championship match between Kasparov and Nigel Short in London, for which he was one of the official commentators along with Grandmasters Jonathan Speelman and Daniel King. He was the instrumental force behind 'Brain Games', which organized the World Championship match in 2000 between Kasparov and Vladimir Kramnik. Following the match, however, he retained the trophy in lieu of money he believed he was owed by the collapse of Brain Games: Kramnik did not receive it until 2008. Brain Games later collapsed in controversial circumstances.

=== Columnist ===
Keene became the chess columnist of The Spectator in March 1977. His column was terminated in September 2019, when he was replaced by Luke McShane. Following the retirement of Harry Golombek, Keene was appointed the chess correspondent of The Times in 1985. In November 2019 he was replaced by David Howell. In December 1996 he became the chess columnist of the Sunday Times. In August 2017 he was replaced by David Howell.

=== Television personality ===
Keene has appeared on television. He covered the world championships of 1981, 1985, 1986, 1990, 1993, and 1995 for BBC 2, Channel 4, and Thames TV. In the Duels of the Mind series which aired on the UK ITV network, Keene, along with South African author and civil rights campaigner Donald Woods, discussed and analysed what Keene regarded as the twelve best chess games ever played.

=== Magazine editor ===
From 1978 to 1982, Keene was the editor of Modern Chess Theory, a magazine on openings which included contributions from the Soviet world champions Mikhail Botvinnik, Vasily Smyslov, and Mikhail Tal.

=== Author ===
Keene has written over 200 books on chess and mind games. He was for many years the Chess Advisor to Batsford Books. His early books such as Howard Staunton (1975, with R. N. Coles) often dealt with players with styles similar to his own. Aron Nimzowitsch: a Reappraisal (1974) is much admired and was revised and translated into Russian in 1986, with an algebraic edition published in English in 1999. In 1989, he and Nathan Divinsky wrote Warriors of the Mind, an attempt to determine the 64 best chess players of all time. The statistical methods used have not met with wide approval, but the player biographies and games were regarded by one book as providing a good overview.

=== Working for Korchnoi ===
In 1978, along with Michael Stean and Jacob Murey, Keene helped Viktor Korchnoi during the 1978 World Chess Championship Karpov–Korchnoi match.

=== Working for Karpov ===
In 1981, Keene came to the USSR and helped Anatoly Karpov prepare for the 1981 World Chess Championship Karpov–Korchnoi match.

== Other issues ==
=== Allegations of plagiarism ===
Keene has on several occasions been accused of plagiarism. In 1993 John Donaldson accused Keene of committing plagiarism in The Complete Book of Gambits (Batsford, 1992). Donaldson wrote "Just how blatant was the plagiarism? Virtually every word and variation in the four and a half pages devoted to Lisitsin's Gambit in Keene's book was stolen."

In 2013, Edward Winter reflected on plagiarism in chess: "a particularly sordid corner of the chess world which will never be eradicated without maximum public exposure". He went on: "The latest instance is the discovery by Justin Horton that material from the first volume of Kasparov’s My Great Predecessors series has been misappropriated by Raymond Keene in The Spectator."

Private Eye describes the plagiarism as involving "substantial amounts of text lifted from chess books, mainly Kasparov's but also other authors". One case involves Keene's notes to a game between Garry Kasparov and Anatoly Karpov, which he annotated for The Times on 8 December 2011 and The Spectator on 5 January 2013.

These alleged plagiarisms, which Winter calls "eye-popping" are catalogued at "a convenient 'plagiarism index' which is being kept updated".

=== Tony Miles ===
In 1985, Keene received £1,178 from the BCF for being Tony Miles' second at the Interzonal in Tunis; however, he had not actually been Miles' second but accepted the money and shared it with Miles. Miles never banked the cheque and told the BCF about the scam in 1987. Two months later, Keene resigned his posts as BCF Publicity Director and FIDE delegate. Keene said that his resignation was for different reasons, and that he was "furious" at his treatment after organising numerous events from 1983 to 1987.

=== Brain Games Network ===
In 2000, Keene's former brother-in-law David Levy accused him of deceiving the directors of their company Mind Sports Olympiad Ltd (MSO) by setting up a rival company, Brain Games Network plc (BGN), without their knowledge and using £50,000 of MSO Ltd money to do so. Levy further alleged that Keene changed his story several times as to the purpose of the payment and the reasons why the new company had been set up. He complained that shares in the new company were held by Keene and an associate (Don Morris) but not by the company for which they had been supposed to be working, nor any of its directors other than themselves. Levy wrote:

As one would expect, our original investors were equally astounded at the news and extremely angry at Keene. They had by now invested £1.5 million (approximately $2.25 million at that time) partly or largely on the basis of their faith in Keene and myself. Now they had learned that one of their two key consultants, the one with money-raising skills, had been working to set up a rival company.

Nothing, however, was proven against Keene (who had swiftly paid an identical sum, i.e. £50,000 to MSO, making the subsequent explanation that this constituted a personal loan from himself) and his new company went on to organise the world championship match later that same year. (It was at this time that Private Eye started referring to him as "The Penguin", a nickname he had first acquired in 1966.)

Levy further criticised Keene for selling three of his own companies to BGN for £220,000 despite their being "virtually worthless". The three companies had between them "a total capital and reserves of only £2,300". At much the same time, according to Levy, BGN purchased a web site and two domain names from Chess and Bridge Limited. However, they made the purchase in two stages. The first of these stages was its sale to Giloberg Finance Limited, owned by Keene's associate Alan Lubin: the second was the immediate sale of the same items, by Giloberg, to BGN. The first sale was for approximately £60,000 (in fact $100,000) and the second was for £290,000, hence making Giloberg "an instant profit of approximately £230,000" and raising the question of why BGN should have paid a sum much greater than the original vendors considered the items were worth.

BGN collapsed in controversial circumstances. Shareholders were unhappy that sums amounting to at least £675,000 had been paid to directors in "fees and payments" despite the company swiftly becoming insolvent. Investors were also unhappy that Keene and Lubin had acquired 88% of the company "for a song" even though the remaining 12% had been sold for around £3 million.

During the course of the 2000 Braingames World Championship Keene was accused of heavy-handed behaviour in having journalist John Henderson removed from the press room with the assistance of bouncers.

=== Korchnoi ===
Viktor Korchnoi alleged that when acting as his second in the 1978 World Championship match, Keene broke his contract by writing a book about the match (which appeared three days after the match finished) having specifically signed an agreement "not to write, compile or help to write or compile any book during the course of the match". Korchnoi commented: "Mr Keene betrayed me. He violated the contract. It was clear that while Mr Keene was writing one book and then another, Mr Stean was doing his work for him."

Attempts to defend Keene were rebutted by Michael Stean's mother, who stated that she was in a position to know what was in Keene's contract since she herself had typed it. Keene, she claimed, had signed this despite having already negotiated a contract with Batsford to write a book about the match. She described "a premeditated and deliberate plan to deceive" and noted that Keene's conduct had come under suspicion during the match.
