= Gábor Kállai =

Hungarian chess grandmaster (1959–2021)

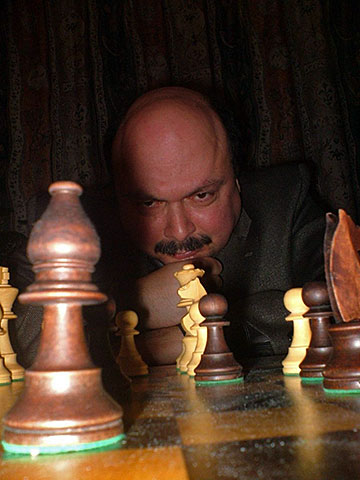

Personal information
- Born: February 21, 1959 Budapest, Hungary
- Died: December 31, 2021 (aged 62) Budapest, Hungary

Chess career
- Country: Hungary
- Title: Grandmaster (1995)
- Peak rating: 2555 (July 2001)

Gábor Kállai (21 February 1959 – 31 December 2021) was a Hungarian chess Grandmaster.

== Life and career ==
In team championships he has won several gold medals; in Hungary with MTK-VM and with Miskolci SSC, in Switzerland with the team of Bern, and in France with the team of Strasbourg.

He has written nine books, published in multiple languages. Basic Chess Openings is his most popular work, published in Hungarian, Italian, English and French. Since 2005 he has written a chess column in the Hungarian daily newspaper Népszabadság and from 2006 has presented a TV-program on Hungarian SPORT1 TV (SAKKK!). In 2014, he was named chair of MTK's chess section.

As a chess trainer, he worked between 1983–1986 as a second of GM Zoltán Ribli, between 1980–1994 as one of the coaches of Zsuzsa Polgár and in 2005, was appointed a FIDE Senior Trainer (the highest trainer licence of FIDE). From 2012 to 2013 he coached Kayden Troff and between 2012 and 2015 Jeffery Xiong. In 2015, he was appointed a master instructor at the Hungarian Physical Education University.

From 2001 to 2005 he was the Professional Director of the Hungarian Chess Federation (HCF). He coached the Hungarian Men's Team for the 2002 Bled Chess Olympiad, guiding the team to the silver medal position. From 2005 to 2010 he was the Public Relations Director of the HCF. In 2006, he was a founding member of the Hungarian Association of Talent Support Organizations. From 2014, he was member of the board of directors at Bay Area Chess. Kállai died on 31 December 2021, at the age of 62.
