= Tibor Károlyi (chess player) =

Hungarian chess player (born 1961)

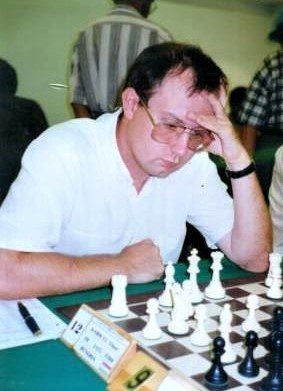

Personal information
- Born: 15 November 1961 (age 64) Budapest, Hungary

Chess career
- Country: Hungary
- Title: International Master (1983)
- FIDE rating: 2324 (January 2016)
- Peak rating: 2475 (January 1988)

Tibor Károlyi (born 15 November 1961) is a Hungarian chess International Master, International Arbiter (1997), coach, theoretician, and author.

== Career ==
Károlyi won the open Hungarian Chess Championship in 1984 (the closed championship was won by Andras Adorjan). In 1989 he started his coaching career. Among his students were Peter Leko, Judit Polgár, Ildikó Mádl and Jason Goh Koon-Jong.

Károlyi has written numerous theoretical articles for New in Chess, but he is probably best known as author of popular chess books. His book Endgame Virtuoso Anatoly Karpov (co-authored with Nick Aplin) won The Guardian 2007 Chess Book of the Year award.

His handle on Playchess is "tkarolyi".

== Notable games ==
- Garry Kasparov vs. Tibor Karolyi Jr., Dortmund 1980, Queen's Indian Defense: Kasparov–Petrosian Variation (E12), ½–½
- Mikhail Tal vs. Tibor Karolyi Jr., Tallinn 1985, Queen's Gambit Declined: Semi-Tarrasch Defense, Main Line (D42), ½–½
- Jaan Ehlvest vs. Tibor Karolyi Jr., Tallinn 1985, Spanish Game: Morphy Defense, Fianchetto Defense Deferred (C76), 0–1
- Andras Adorjan vs. Tibor Karolyi Jr., Ch Hungary (team) 1993, Zukertort Opening: Sicilian Invitation (A04), 0–1

== Bibliography ==
- Karolyi, Tibor (2004). Judit Polgar – The Princess of Chess. Batsford. ISBN 0713488905.
- Karolyi, Tibor; Aplin, Nick (2007). Kasparov's Fighting Chess 1993-1998. Batsford. ISBN 978-0713489941.
- Karolyi, Tibor; Aplin, Nick (2007). Kasparov's Fighting Chess 1999-2005. Batsford. ISBN 9780-7134-8984-2.
- Karolyi, Tibor; Aplin, Nick (2007). Endgame Virtuoso Anatoly Karpov. New In Chess. ISBN 978-90-5691-202-4.
- Karolyi, Tibor; Aplin, Nick (2009). Kasparov: How His Predecessors Misled Him About Chess. Batsford. ISBN 9781906388263.
- Karolyi, Tibor; Aplin, Nick (2009). Genius in the Background. Quality Chess. ISBN 978-1906552-37-4.
- Karolyi, Tibor (2011). Karpov's Strategic Wins 1 - The Making of a Champion 1961-1985. Quality Chess. ISBN 978-1906552-41-1.
- Karolyi, Tibor (2011). Karpov's Strategic Wins 2 - The Prime Years 1986-2010. Quality Chess. ISBN 978-1906552-42-8.
- Karolyi, Tibor (2014). Mikhail Tal's Best Games 1 - The Magic of Youth 1949-1959. Quality Chess. ISBN 978-1-907982-77-4.
- Karolyi, Tibor (2015). Mikhail Tal's Best Games 2 - The World Champion 1960-1971. Quality Chess. ISBN 978-1-907982-79-8.
- Karolyi, Tibor (2016). Legendary Chess Careers - Yasser Seirawan. Niepolomice, Poland: Chess Evolution. ISBN 978-83-944290-4-1.
- Karolyi, Tibor (2018). Endgame Virtuoso Magnus Carlsen. New In Chess. ISBN 978-9056917760.
