= Erik Kislik =

American chess player

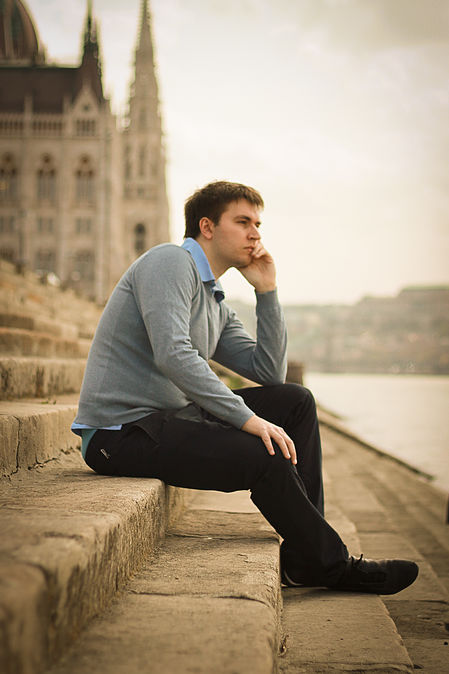
- Erik Kislik, 2012

Personal information
- Born: Erik Andrew Kislik; November 14, 1987 (age 38) Hillsborough, California, U.S.

Chess career
- Country: United States
- Title: International Master (2012)
- FIDE rating: 2331 (December 2019)
- Peak rating: 2415 (May 2012)

Erik Andrew Kislik (/ˈkɪzlɪk/ KIZ-lik; born November 14, 1987) is an American chess International Master from Hillsborough, California. He achieved his first FIDE chess rating at age 20 and the International Master title at age 24. His peak FIDE rating is 2415 (May 2012).

Kislik has won a number of notable tournaments, including the First Saturday IM tournament in October 2008 and April 2009. He also won the Caissa GM tournament in February 2012 and was the joint winner of the Caissa 2012 New Year GM tournament.

In 2018, Kislik made a "Beginner DVD" for manoshpere influencer and prominent misogynist Andrew Tate, which was included in Tate's subscription website "Hustler's University". The course remains for sale as a "pick-up artist's tool" and contains classy chapter titles such as "Trapping your B**".

== Bibliography ==
Kislik is the author of the book Applying Logic in Chess, published by Gambit, May 2018. This book won second place for FIDE Book of the Year award, 2018.

Kislik wrote a book successor to Applying Logic in Chess called Chess Logic in Practice, published by Gambit, July 2019.

== Contributions to opening theory ==
In a Chess.com article, International Master Bryan Smith wrote that Kislik "had 2700 level preparation" but later edited his wording to "is very strong in opening theory."
