= Daniel King (chess player) =

English chess grandmaster (born 1963)

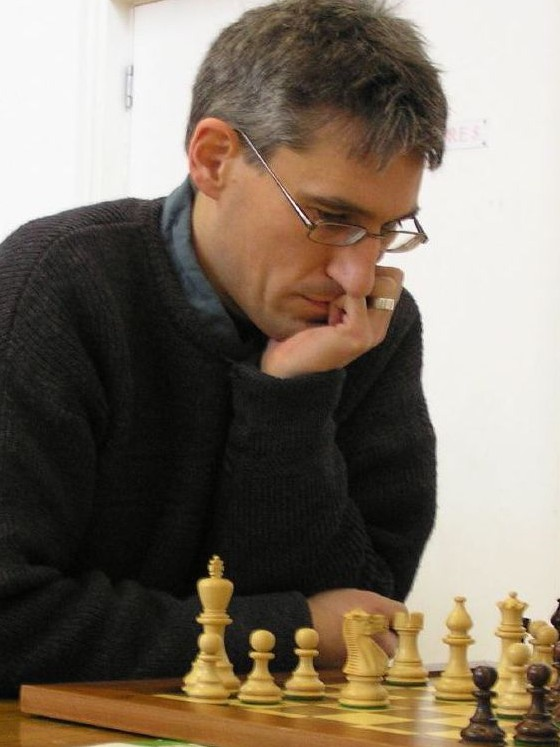
- King in 2006

Personal information
- Born: Daniel John King; 28 August 1963 (age 63) Beckenham, England

Chess career
- Country: England
- Title: Grandmaster (1989)
- FIDE rating: 2466 (November 2026)
- Peak rating: 2560 (July 1990)
- Peak ranking: No. 65 (July 1990)

Daniel John King (born 28 August 1963) is an English chess grandmaster, writer, coach, journalist, and broadcaster.

== Chess career ==
King achieved the International Master title in 1982 and the Grandmaster title in 1989. He won minor tournaments around the world and recorded promising results at some prestigious events; for example, 4th= at Bern 1987, 4th= British Championship 1987, 1st= (with Boris Gelfand) at the Sydney Open 1988, 5th= London 1988, 2nd= Dortmund 1988 and 2nd (after Bent Larsen) London 1989. At the Geneva Young Masters in 1990, he shared first place with the Australian Ian Rogers.

King later pursued a media career as presenter, commentator, reporter and analyst, and this likely affected his playing career by limiting the opportunity for dedicated research and study. Nevertheless, he has played professionally for more than 20 years at a high level, including the top leagues of the Bundesliga and 4NCL. In 1996, he won the Bunratty Masters, an Irish tournament with an impressive list of previous winners, including John Nunn, Sergei Tiviakov and Peter Svidler.

King represented England at the European Team Chess Championship (Haifa 1989) and at the Reykjavik Visa Chess Summit of 1990, the latter being the scene of a victory over the strong Soviet team and a team silver medal.

King is usually known as 'Dan' or 'Danny'. He has coached some of the UK's brightest chess prospects and has written more than 15 chess books on topics ranging from the preparatory Winning with the Najdorf to the self-tutoring How Good is your Chess? and Test Your Chess.

== Media interests ==
He became well known nationally for his coverage of the World Chess Championship 1993, live from the Savoy in London, on Channel 4 television. The programme, hosted by Carol Vorderman, contained expert commentary and analysis from King, Ray Keene, Jon Speelman and Fritz, the chess-playing computer program. The show was popular, showing King to be a likeable, media-friendly personality. It was reported that he had become the choice of 'thinking women' across the UK, as they watched in large numbers, whether chess-literate or not. Television work continued to come his way and he contributed to three further world championships broadcast by the BBC, ESPN, Eurosport, STAR TV (Asia) and other networks. He covered the controversial Kasparov versus Deep Blue match in 1997 and, for four months in 1999, provided daily MSN commentary on the high-profile Kasparov versus The World game. In October 2002, he was a key member of the elite analytical team engaged in the prominent 'man versus machine' contest, Brains in Bahrain.

King was a games consultant for the Cilla Black (ITV) show Moment of Truth. He scripted and presented two half-hour chess documentaries on radio and has, over many years, produced instructional chess videos and DVDs for GM Video and ChessBase, among others. In the mid-1990s he appeared in the UK advertising campaign for Audi/Volkswagen cars.

King writes regular columns in CHESS magazine ("How Good Is Your Chess?") and Schach 64, the leading journals of the UK and Germany (he speaks German fluently). From 2006 to 2012, he co-hosted a regular Monday chess column with Ronan Bennett in The Guardian, which sought to be instructive, rather than topical. Through test positions taken from actual games, their amateur and expert assessments of the possible continuations were discussed and compared. Nigel Short's column was axed to make way for the style-shift, and this change was debated in chess circles. Since 2010, King has served as a main commentator/presenter at ChessBase and has hosted the commentary at the London Chess Classic tournament. He runs the PowerPlayChess Youtube Channel which is regularly updated with new chess-related content including chess puzzles and analysis of high-level games. In 2016, chess historian Edward Winter ranked him as one of the top six English-language internet chess commentators on major matches and tournaments. He lives in Teddington, in the London Borough of Richmond upon Thames.

== Selected bibliography ==
- King, Daniel (1997). Kasparov v. Deeper Blue: The Ultimate Man v. Machine Challenge. Batsford. ISBN 0-7134-8322-9.
- Kasparov, Garry; King, Daniel (2000). Kasparov Against the World: The Story of the Greatest Online Challenge. KasparovChess Online. ISBN 0970481306.
- King, Daniel (2002). Winning With the Najdorf. Sterling Pub Co Inc. ISBN 0713470372.
- King, Daniel (2003). How Good Is Your Chess?. Dover. ISBN 048644676X.
- King, Daniel (2009). How To Play Chess. Kingfisher. ISBN 978-0753419182.
- King, Daniel (2020). Sultan Khan. New In Chess. ISBN 978-9056918743.
- King, Daniel (2022). King's Kalashnikov Sicilian. New In Chess. ISBN 978-9493257313.
