= Efstratios Grivas =

Greek chess grandmaster (born 1966)

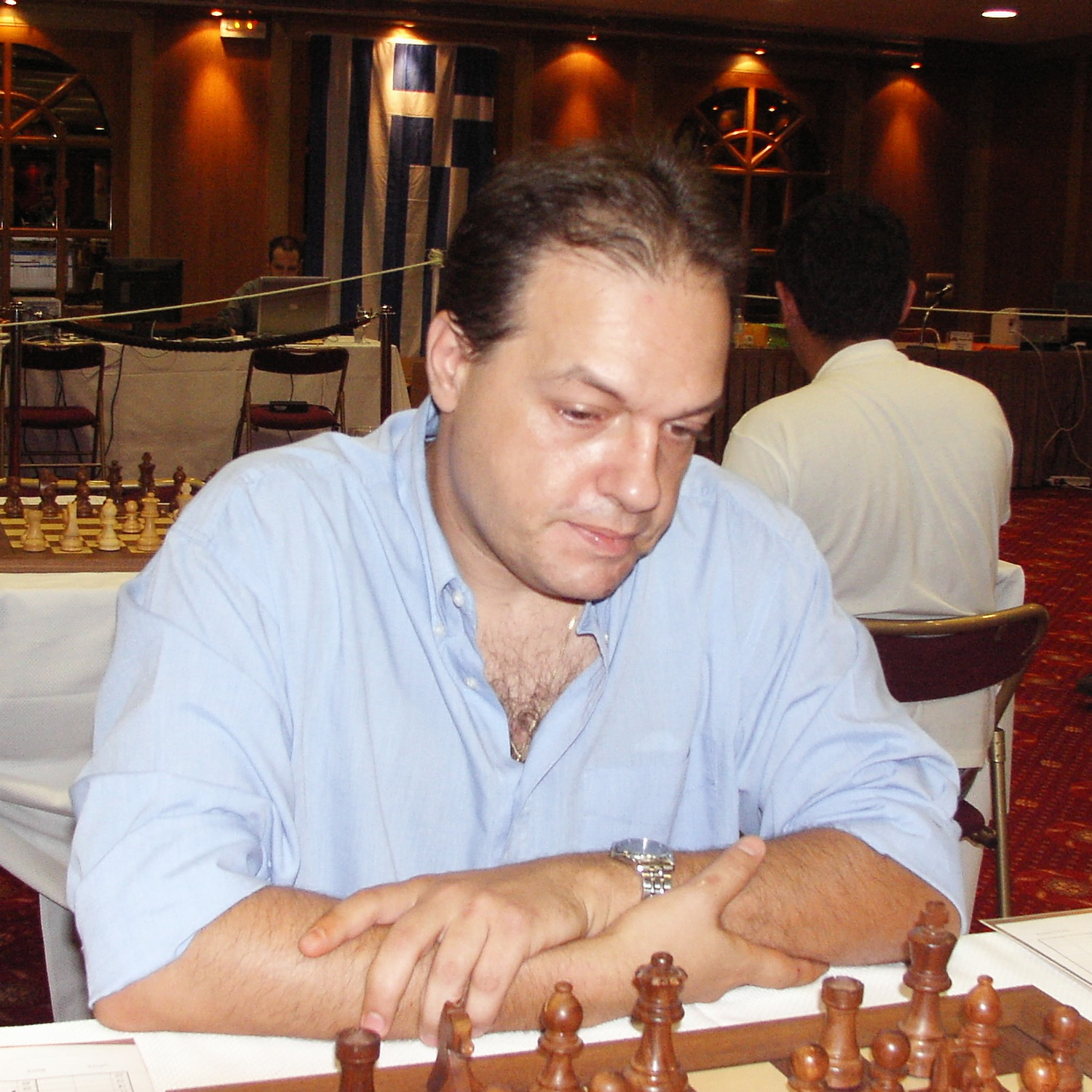

Personal information
- Born: March 30, 1966 (age 60) Egio, Greece

Chess career
- Country: Greece
- Title: Grandmaster (1993)
- Peak rating: 2528 (January 1999)

Efstratios Grivas (born March 30, 1966) is a Greek chess player who holds the titles of Grandmaster, FIDE Senior Trainer, International Arbiter, and FIDE International Organizer.

== Early years ==
He was born in Egio, Achaia and grew up in Athens, in the neighbourhood of Kallithea, as his family moved to the Greek capital in 1970. His registration at the Kallithea Chess Club in 1979 was his first contact with chess. Two years later he won the Greek Cadet Championship, under the guidance of FM Panagiotis Drepaniotis (1979–1981).

He wrote the book "The Grivas Sicilian".

== Chess career ==
A relatively late starter, Grivas was taught how to play at a chess club when he was 13 years old. He was later trained by IM Dr. Nikolai Minev (1981–1982), FM Michalis Kaloskambis (1984–1986), GM Efim Geller (1987–1988) and IM Nikolai Andrianov (1990–1996). He took part in a FIDE training camp in Moscow in 1984.

Grivas has played in Greece for the following clubs: Kallithea Chess Club (1979–1994), OAA “Iraklion” (1995–1998), Kavala Chess Club (1999), AO “Kydon” Khania (2000–2005) and A.E.K. (2006-).

From 1982 until 1999 he represented Greece 186 times (12 in the National Junior Team and 174 in the National Men's Team), having participated in eight Olympiads (1984, 1986, 1988, 1990, 1992, 1994, 1996, 1998), three European Team Chess Championships (1989, 1992, 1997), and twelve Balkaniads (1982, 1983, 1984, 1985, 1986, 1987, 1988, 1989, 1990, 1992, 1993, 1994).

His greatest success was winning the Silver Individual Medal (on 3rd board) at the 33rd Chess Olympiad in 1998. Other important successes were the Gold Individual Medal (on the 3rd board) at the European Team Championship in 1989, 4th place at the World Junior Chess Championship in 1985, 1st place at the 1987 Munich international tournament (320 participants), 11th individual place (on the 4th board) at the 32nd Chess Olympiad in 1996, qualification of his club (OAA “Iraklion”) to Europe's best 16 clubs in 1997 (European Club Cup)

He scored the following at international tournaments: 3rd in Paris 1982, 1st in Cap d'Agde 1983, 2nd in Karditsa 1984, 3rd in Bucharest 1984, 2nd in Strasbourg 1985, 2nd in Munich 1986, 3rd in Xanthi 1991, 2nd in Gausdal 1993, 3rd in Reykjavík 1994, 2nd in Limassol 1997, 1st in Hellexpo-Sportexpo 2001.

His handles on the Internet Chess Club are "E-Grivas" and "Gref".

== Author ==
From 1982 on he successfully worked as a journalist in newspapers and magazines (in Greek and in English). Between January 1992 and September 1999 he was editor-in-chief and main contributor of the monthly magazine of the Greek Chess Federation, Greek Chess.

In 2010 he was awarded the Boleslavsky Medal (best author) for 2009.

His latest books (2024) is a series called The Chess Instructor. They are a series of 18 books and are published in English.

== Administrator and organizer ==
He was a founding member of the Association of Top Greek Chessplayers (1995) and has since been a member of its Policy Board (Executive Secretary 1996-1997 and vice-president since 1998). From 1996 until 1999 he held the position of Greek Chess Federation Technical Advisor. Finally, he served as a member of FIDE's Players’ Council (1998–2002). He holds the titles of FIDE International Organizer (was a co-organizer of the 1999 European Youth Chess Championships in Litochoro Pierias with more than 1000 participants) and FIDE International Arbiter, titles that are awarded according to specific requirements and are not honorary.

== Trainer ==
His work in this field includes more than 12000 hours of training in many clubs, especially with younger players. From 1986 to 1991 he was the Federal Trainer of the National Juniors Team. During the period 1989–1990 he was the Trainer of the DEI Macedonia-Thrace Chess Academy, while during 1996–1998 and 2002–2004 he held the same position in Pnevmatiki Stegi Peristeriou Chess Club and finally during 2002–2005 he worked with Koropi Sports & Chess Club as well. In 2001–2002 he worked as a professor at the Institute of Professional Education in Peristeri and as External Contributor with O.E.E.K. (Sports Department - Chess Trainer Faculty) while from 2001 to 2004 he also offered his chess services to the Military Officers’ Academy.

In 2004 Grivas was awarded the title of FIDE Senior Trainer.

== Notable games ==
- Efstratios Grivas vs Nigel Short, Ol. 1986, Queen's Gambit Declined: Tartakower Defense (D58), 1-0
- Efstratios Grivas vs Vladimir Tukmakov, Kavala op 1991, Queen's Indian Defense: Classical Variation (E17), 1-0
- Efstratios Grivas vs Zhaoqin Peng, Corus (Group C) 2008, Zukertort Opening: Queen Pawn Defense (A06), 1-0
- Efstratios Grivas vs Arik Braun, Corus (Group C) 2008, Slav Defense: Breyer Variation (D11), 1-0

== Books ==
- A Complete Guide to the Grivas Sicilian (2005, Gambit Publications; ISBN 978-1-904600-36-7)
- Beating the Fianchetto Defences (2006, Gambit; ISBN 978-1-904600-48-0)
- Chess College 1: Strategy (2006, Gambit; ISBN 978-1-904600-45-9)
- Chess College 2: Pawn Play (2006, Gambit; ISBN 978-1-904600-47-3)
- Chess College 3: Technique (2006, Gambit; ISBN 978-1-904600-57-2)
- Modern Chess Planning (2007, Gambit; ISBN 978-1-904600-68-8)
- Practical Endgame Play - mastering the basics (2008, Everyman Chess; ISBN 978-1-85744-556-5)
- The Chess Instructor – The Isolated Pawn by E. Grivas (2024, Chess-shop.gr, ISBN 9786188710719)
- The Chess Instructor – Majority & Minority by E. Grivas (2024, Chess-shop.gr, ISBN 9786188710726)

=== Openings ===
- Ispaniki Partida (in Greek, 1987, Kaissa Chess Center)
- A Complete Guide to the Grivas Sicilian (2005, Gambit; ISBN 978-190-460-036-7)
- Beating the Fianchetto Defences (2006, Gambit; ISBN 978-1-904600-48-0)
- SOS - Secrets of Opening Surprises 13 (2011, Interchess BV (New In Chess; ISBN 978-90-5691-341-0)
- Grivas Opening Laboratory - Volume 1 (2019, Chess Evolution Kft; ISBN 978-615-5793-19-6)
- Grivas Opening Laboratory - Volume 2 (2020, Chess Evolution; ISBN 978-615-5793-22-6)
- Grivas Opening Laboratory - Volume 3 (2020, Chess Evolution; ISBN 978-615-5793-24-0)
- Grivas Opening Laboratory - Volume 4 (2020, Chess Evolution; ISBN 978-615-5793-25-7)
- Grivas Opening Laboratory - Volume 5 (2020, Chess Evolution; ISBN 978-615-5793-26-4)
- Grivas Opening Laboratory - Volume 6 (2021, Chess Evolution; ISBN 978-615-5793-28-8)
- Grivas Opening Laboratory - Volume 7 (2021, Chess Evolution; ISBN 978-615-5793-30-1)
- The Modernized Grivas Sicilian (2022, Thinkers Publishing; ISBN 978-94-6420-139-0)
- The Grivas Anti-Sicilian Bible (2022, Thinkers; ISBN 978-94-6420-161-1)
