= Nick Aplin =

Singaporean lecturer (born 1952)

Nick Aplin (born 7 March 1952) was a Senior Lecturer at the Physical Education and Sports Science Academic Group (PESS) at the National Institute of Education (NIE). From January 2020 he became the Deputy Director, Sport Heritage at Sport Singapore.

In 1972 he studied at Loughborough College for his degree in physical education (PE). He graduated in 1976.

In 1984 Nick Aplin studied a master's degree at Loughborough. In late 1985 he became a lecturer at the College of Physical Education in Singapore. He completed a PhD in 1999.

Nick Aplin's first book, To the Finishing Line, was published in 2002. It was a set of biographical impressions of the first three Singaporean women Olympians: Tang Pui Wah, Mary Klass and Janet Jesudason. In 2009 he published Perspectives on Physical Education and Sports Science in Singapore. Alongside Tibor Károlyi, Aplin wrote a series of chess books. Endgame Virtuoso Anatoly Karpov was Guardian's Chess Book of the Year in 2007.

== Bibliography ==
- Aplin, Nick (2002). To The Finishing Line. Singapore National Printers. ISBN 981-248-000-5.
- Aplin, Nick; Waters, David; Wee-Leong May Lai (2005). Singapore Olympians: The Complete Who's Who 1936–2004. Singapore National Olympic Council. ISBN 978-981-248-072-9.
- Károlyi, Tibor; Aplin, Nick (2007). Kasparov's Fighting Chess 1993–1998. Batsford. ISBN 978-0-7134-8994-1.
- Károlyi, Tibor; Aplin, Nick (2007). Kasparov's Fighting Chess 1999–2005. Batsford. ISBN 978-0-7134-8984-2.
- Károlyi, Tibor; Aplin, Nick (2007). Endgame Virtuoso Anatoly Karpov. New In Chess. ISBN 978-90-5691-202-4.
- Károlyi, Tibor; Aplin, Nick (2009). Kasparov: How His Predecessors Misled Him About Chess. Batsford. ISBN 978-1-906388-26-3.
- Aplin, Nick, ed. (2009). Perspectives on Physical Education and Sports Science in Singapore: an Eye on the Youth Olympics 2010. McGraw-Hill Education. ISBN 978-007-128164-5.
- Károlyi, Tibor; Aplin, Nick (2009). Genius in the Background. Quality Chess. ISBN 978-1-906552-37-4.
- Aplin, Nick (2019). Sport in Singapore: The Colonial Legacy. Straits Times Press. ISBN 978-981-48-2765-2.
- Aplin, Nick (2023). Sport in Singapore: The Rocky Road to Kallang Park. Sport Singapore. ISBN 978-981-18-7085-9.
- Aplin, Nick (2024). Sport in Singapore: Visions for Change. Sport Singapore. Sport Singapore. ISBN 978-981-18-8377-4.
- Aplin, Nick (2025). Tapestry and the Golden Thread. Singapore Spot Heritage (1819 - 1941). ISBN 978-981-94-2887-8.
- Aplin, Nick & Leong Mang Teng (2026). Barbara Kerr: Guns and Guides. Sport Singapore. ISBN 978-981-94-6151-6
