= Richard Griffith (chess player) =

English chess player, author and editor (1872–1955)

Richard Clewin Griffith (22 July 1872 in London – 11 December 1955 in Hendon, London) was an English chess player, author and editor. He was educated at Charterhouse School.

He won the British Chess Championship in 1912 at Richmond, at his only appearance in the event. Also in 1912, he was the original co-author with John Herbert White of the famous chess book, Modern Chess Openings, which has gone into many editions up to the present day.

He was the editor of the British Chess Magazine from 1920 to 1937, and again for some months in 1940.

During World War II Griffith was the honorary treasurer of the British Chess Federation, and a member of its council and executive.

By profession, he was a metallurgist for an assaying company.
