= John Herbert White =

British chess writer (1880–1920)

John Herbert White (22 February 1880 – 18 November 1920, London, England) was co-author with Richard Clewin Griffith of the first three editions of the famous chess opening treatise Modern Chess Openings. It was first published in 1911 and is still in print. Griffith and White explained in the preface to the first edition that "the many recent master tournaments have rendered necessary an up-to-date book on the Openings" and that "the book is intended to be a guide for match and tournament players". The fifteenth edition, by American grandmaster Nick de Firmian, was published in 2008. The book is commonly referred to as MCO today.

White was the Secretary of the Hampstead Chess Club. He died in 1920 in a bicycle accident.
