= Walter Korn =

American chess book author (1908–1997)

Walter Korn (May 22, 1908 in Prague, Bohemia, Austria-Hungary (now Czech Republic) – July 9, 1997 in San Mateo, California, United States) was an Austro-Hungarian writer of books and magazine articles about chess. Despite his status as a writer, there is no known record of him playing tournament chess, and few chess players ever met him. One of his few known games is a draw against a 13-year-old Gordon Crown, published in the April 1943 issue of Chess. Korn was a FIDE International Judge for chess compositions and contributed the entire topic of chess for the Encyclopædia Britannica (1972).

Korn was the writer of Modern Chess Openings (MCO) (revised editions 7 through 12, 13th revised by Nick de Firmian), which was considered an authoritative work on the openings of chess. A new edition of MCO would come out every five years or so, and it was essential reading for tournament chess players.

In later years, Korn enlisted the help of top players, such as grandmasters Larry Evans and Nick de Firmian, while continuing as a co-author.

Korn fled his homeland for London in 1939. Several years later, in Germany, he directed the U.N. Relief and Rehabilitation Administration, helping to relocate concentration camp survivors. In 1948, he served as national director of World ORT in Geneva. He immigrated to the United States in 1950, and lived in Detroit, where he worked as a business manager of the Jewish Community Center. From 1960 to 1964, he lived in Israel, working for both the Joint Distribution Committee and the United Jewish Appeal.

== Books ==
- Modern Chess Openings (11th ed.). ISBN 0-273-41845-9.
- Modern Chess Openings (12th ed.). David McKay Company, Inc. 1982. ISBN 0-679-13500-6.
- Modern Chess Openings (13th ed.). ISBN 0-8129-1785-5.
- American Chess Art: 250 Portraits of Endgame Study. ISBN 0-273-07215-3.
- The Brilliant Touch in Chess. London: Sir Isaac Pitman and Sons Ltd, 1950

== Sources ==
- Modern Chess Openings (11th ed.). ISBN 0-273-41845-9. – sleeve notes for biography and photo
