= Nathan Divinsky =

Canadian mathematician, university professor, chess master, writer and politician

Nathan Joseph Harry Divinsky

Personal details
- Born: October 29, 1925 Winnipeg, Manitoba, Canada
- Died: June 17, 2012 (aged 86)
- Party: Non-Partisan Association

Nathan Joseph Harry Divinsky (October 29, 1925 – June 17, 2012) was a Canadian mathematician, university professor, chess master, writer, and politician. Divinsky was also known for being the former husband of the 19th Prime minister of Canada, Kim Campbell. Divinsky and Campbell were married from 1972 to 1983.

== Early life, education, and academic career ==
He was born in Winnipeg, Manitoba, in 1925, and was a contemporary and friend of Canadian Grandmaster and lawyer Daniel Yanofsky. Divinsky received a Bachelor of Science from the University of Manitoba in 1946. He received a Master of Science in 1947, and a PhD in Mathematics under A. A. Albert in 1950 from the University of Chicago after which he returned to Winnipeg and was on the staff of the Mathematics Department of the University of Manitoba for most of the 1950s. Divinsky then moved to Vancouver where he served as a mathematics professor, and also as an assistant dean of science, at the University of British Columbia in Vancouver, where he spent the remainder of his professional career.

He was featured in many segments relating to mathematics and chess on the Discovery Channel Canada program @discovery.ca, later called Daily Planet. During the first two seasons of the show, he presented a weekly contest segment emphasizing math puzzles.

== Political career ==
Divinsky was a Vancouver School Board trustee from 1974 to 1980, and was the chair from 1978 to 1980. He served as an alderman on Vancouver's city council from 1981 to 1982.

== Chess life ==
Divinsky learned his early chess as a teenager at the Winnipeg Jewish Chess Club, along with Yanofsky. He tied for 3rd–4th places in the Closed Canadian Chess Championship, held at Saskatoon 1945, with 9.5/12, along with John Belson; the joint winners were Yanofsky and Frank Yerhoff at 10.5/12. In the 1951 Closed Canadian Chess Championship, held at Vancouver, Divinsky scored 6/12 to tie for 5th–7th places. He won the Manitoba Championship in both 1946 and 1952, and finished runner-up in 1945. He tied for first place in the 1959 Manitoba Open. Divinsky scored 7.5/11 at Bognor Regis 1966, finishing in a tie for 7–13th places.

He represented Canada twice at the Chess Olympiads, in 1954 at Amsterdam (second reserve board, 0.5/1), and in 1966 at Havana (second reserve board, 4.5/8). Divinsky served as playing captain for both teams, and was the non-playing captain for the 1988 Canadian Olympiad team. Divinsky attained the playing level of National Master in Canada, and received through the Commonwealth Chess Association (founded by English Grandmaster Raymond Keene) the honorary title of International Master (although he did not receive this title officially from FIDE, the World Chess Federation).

Divinsky was also a Life Master at Bridge from 1972.

Divinsky served for 15 years, from 1959 to 1974, as editor of the magazine Canadian Chess Chat, and contributed occasionally to other Canadian chess magazines. He played an important role in chess organization in Canada from the 1950s. He first served as Canada's representative to FIDE (the World Chess Federation), from 1987 to 1994, and served again in this post in 2007. During both terms, he served as a member of the FIDE General Assembly, since Canada is a zone of FIDE. He is a member of the Canadian Chess Hall of Fame, served as President of the Chess Federation of Canada in 1954, and was a Life Governor of the CFC.

He wrote several books on chess (see bibliography below). Chess historian Edward Winter in a 1992 review was very critical of Divinsky's The Batsford Chess Encyclopedia, calling it "A Catastrophic Encyclopedia". Winter in 2008 selected it as one of the five worst chess books in English from the past two decades. Winter's 1989 review of Divinsky and Raymond Keene's book Warriors of the Mind was also negative. In this book, the authors compared great chess champions throughout history using an advanced mathematical treatment; while necessarily imperfect due to generational evolution in chess, it was in fact the pioneering work in this field.

== Family, and marriage to Kim Campbell ==
Divinsky was married three times. He had three daughters from his first marriage: Judy, Pamela, and Mimi. Divinsky met Kim Campbell, 22 years younger, while she was an undergraduate student at the University of British Columbia in the late 1960s. Their relationship continued while Campbell did graduate work at the London School of Economics, and the two were married in 1972. It was his second marriage and her first. Divinsky was a strong influence in interesting Campbell in political activity. The two divorced in 1983, but they remained on good terms. Their marriage produced no children. He died, aged 86, in Vancouver, survived by his third wife Marilyn Goldstone.

== Selected bibliography ==
- Rings and Radicals, University of Toronto Press, 1965.
- Around the Chess World in 80 Years, 1965.
- Linear Algebra, 1975.
- Warriors of the Mind: A Quest for the Supreme Genius of the Chess Board (with Raymond Keene), 1989, 2002. ISBN 0-9513757-2-5
- The Batsford Encyclopedia of Chess, 1990. ISBN 0-7134-6214-0
- Life Maps of the Great Chess Masters, 1994, Seattle, International Chess Enterprises.
