= Fernand Gobet =

Swiss chess player and psychologist (born 1962)

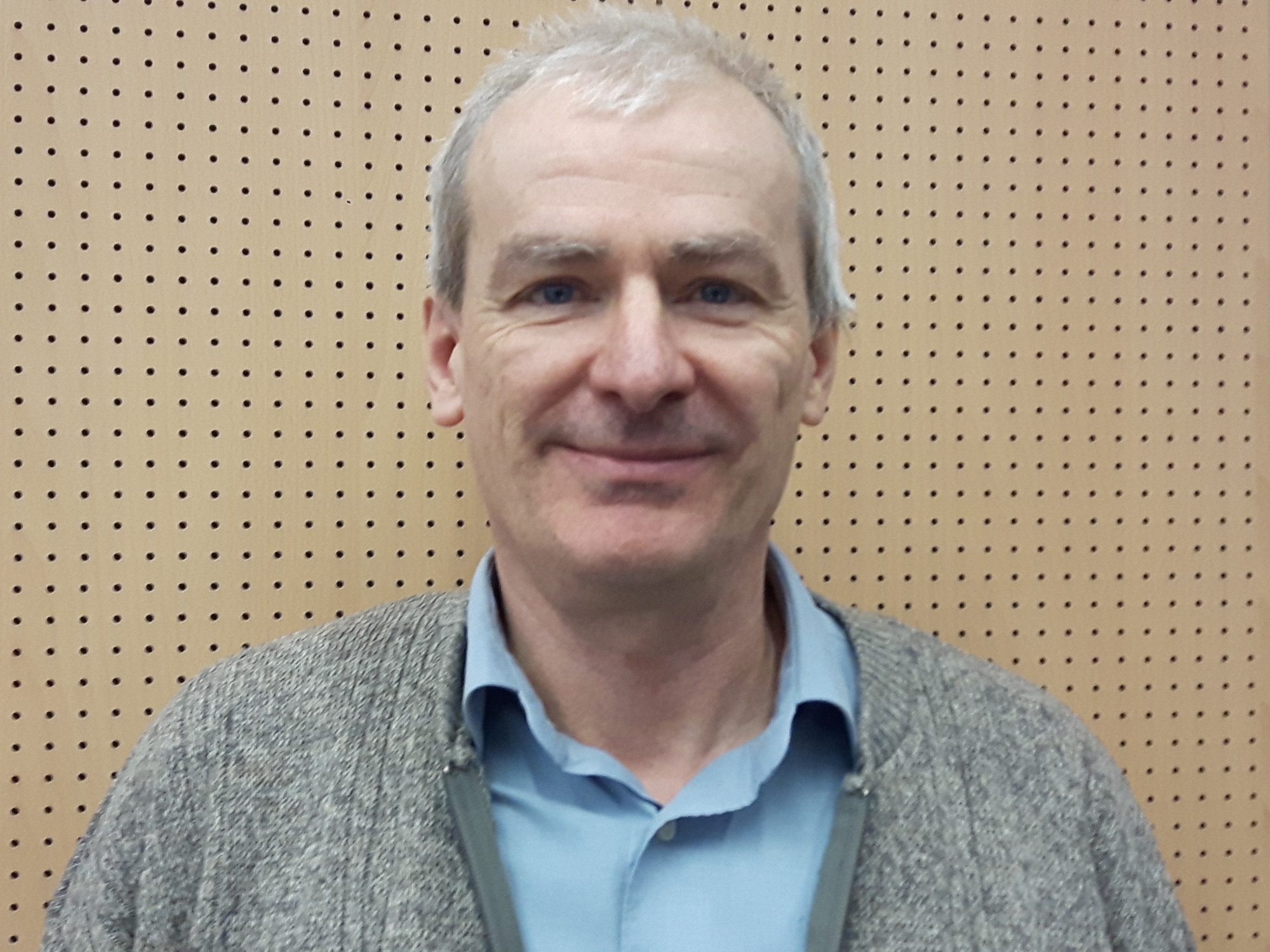
- Born: February 12, 1962 (age 64); Switzerland
- Known for: CHREST cognitive architecture
- Awards: FIDE International Master
- Scientific career
- Fields: Cognitive psychology, Cognitive science
- Workplaces: London School of Economics, University of Roehampton

Fernand Gobet (born February 12, 1962, in Switzerland) is a cognitive scientist and a cognitive psychologist, currently Professorial Research Fellow at the London School of Economics and Professor of Cognitive Psychology at the University of Roehampton. His research interests focus on the study of cognition, especially in the areas of cognitive architectures, perception, intuition, problem solving, learning and decision making. He has developed the CHREST cognitive architecture, an acronym for Chunk Hierarchy and REtrieval STructures, which is a complete architecture for the processes of learning and perception used by humans.

Gobet is also a chess International Master, and played numerous times for the Swiss national team. He was co-editor of the Swiss Chess Review from 1981 to 1989. His Elo rating reached a high of 2401, but he has been inactive in competitive chess since 2012.

== Books ==
- Connolly, C., & Gobet, F. (2024). Transition expertise and identity: A study of individuals who succeeded repeatedly in life and career transitions. Cambridge, UK: Cambridge University Press.
- Addis, M., Lane, P., Sozou, P., & Gobet, F. (Eds.) (2019). Scientific discovery in the social sciences. New York: Springer.
- Gobet, F. (2018). The psychology of chess. London: Routledge.
- Gobet, F. (2015). Understanding expertise: A multidisciplinary approach. London: Palgrave.
- Gobet, F. & Schiller, M. (Eds.) (2014). Problem gambling: Cognition, prevention and treatment. London: Palgrave Macmillan.
- Gobet, F. (2011). Psychologie du talent et de l’expertise. Paris: De Boeck.
- Gobet, F., Chassy, P., & Bilalić, M. (2011). Foundations of cognitive psychology. New York, NY: McGraw Hill.
- Gobet, F., de Voogt, A., & Retschitzki, J. (2004). Moves in mind - The psychology of board games. Hove, UK: Psychology Press.
- de Groot, A. & Gobet, F. (1996). Perception and memory in chess. Heuristics of the professional eye. Assen: Van Gorcum.
- Gobet, F. (1993). Les mémoires d'un joueur d'échecs. Fribourg (Switzerland): Editions Universitaires
