= Harry Golombek =

British chess player

Harold Golombek OBE

Personal information
- Born: 1 March 1911 Lambeth, London, England
- Died: 7 January 1995 (aged 83) Lambeth, London, England

Chess career
- Country: England
- Title: International Master (1950); Grandmaster (1985, honorary)

Harold Golombek OBE (1 March 1911 – 7 January 1995) was a British chess player, chess author, and wartime codebreaker. He was three times British chess champion, in 1947, 1949, and 1955 and finished second in 1948.

== Biography ==
He was born in Lambeth to Polish-Jewish parents. He was the chess correspondent of the newspaper The Times from 1945 to 1985, after Stuart Milner-Barry. He was a FIDE official, and served as arbiter for several important events, including the Candidates' Tournament of 1959 in Yugoslavia, and the 1963 World Chess Championship match between Mikhail Botvinnik and Tigran Petrosian. He also edited the game collections of Capablanca and Réti, and was a respected author. He was editor of British Chess Magazine from 1938 to 1940, and its overseas editor in the 1960s and 1970s. Golombek also translated several chess books from Russian into English.

On the outbreak of World War II in September 1939, Golombek was in Buenos Aires, Argentina, competing in the Chess Olympiad for Britain alongside C. H. O'D. Alexander and Stuart Milner-Barry. They immediately returned to the UK, and were soon recruited into Bletchley Park, the wartime codebreaking centre. Golombek worked in Hut 8, the section responsible for solving German Naval Enigma, moving to another section in October/November 1942. After the war he lived at 35 Albion Crescent, Chalfont St Giles. He was unusual among public figures in replying with care to letters from unknown people, such as young schoolboys, from this address.

Golombek represented England nine times in the Chess Olympiad. He earned the title of International Master in 1950 and was awarded that of Honorary Grandmaster in 1985. He was the first British player to qualify for an Interzonal tournament.

Golombek studied philology at King's College London, having been a pupil at Wilson's Grammar School, Camberwell. He was appointed OBE in 1966, the first to be so honoured for services to chess.

Golombek died 7 January 1995.

== Books ==
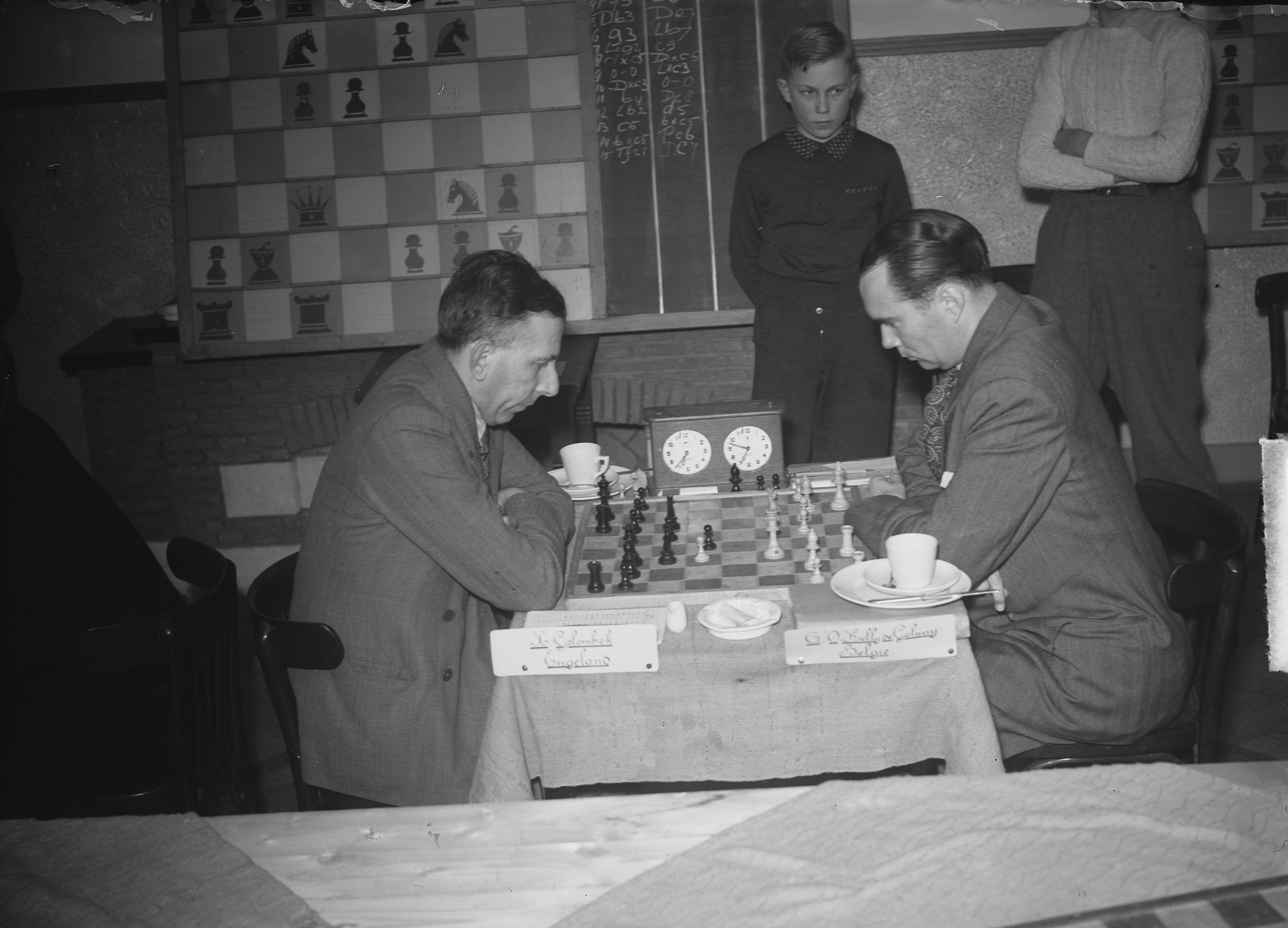
Hoogovens 1949: Golombek vs. Alberic O'Kelly de Galway

- The World Chess Championship 1948, 1948, David McKay
- World Chess Championship 1954, 1954, MacGibbon and Kee
- Reti's Best Games of Chess, 1954, G. Bell & Sons, republished 1974, Dover
- The Game of Chess, 3rd edition,1980, Penguin
- The World Chess Championship 1957, 1957, MacGibbon and Kee
- Instructions to Young Chess Players, 1958, Pitman ISBN 0-273-48550-4
- Modern Opening Chess Strategy, 1959, Pitman
- 4th Candidates Tournament 1959: Bled, Zagreb, Belgrade (originally BCM Quarterly No.3), 1960, BCM
- Capablanca's Hundred Best Games of Chess, 1947, G. Bell and Sons
- Fischer v Spassky: The World Chess Championship 1972, 1973, Barrie & Jenkins
- Chess: A History, 1976, Putnam
- Improve Your Chess, 1976, Pitman
- The Best Games of C.H.O'D. Alexander (co-authored with William Hartston), 1976, Oxford University Press
- Golombek's Encyclopedia of Chess (Golombek as editor-in-chief), 1977, Crown
- Beginning Chess, 1981, Penguin ISBN 978-0140464122
