= Chess endgame literature =

Reading material about chess endgame

Much literature about chess endgames has been produced in the form of books and magazines. A bibliography of endgame books is below.

Many chess masters have contributed to the theory of endgames over the centuries, including Ruy López de Segura, François-André Philidor, Josef Kling and Bernhard Horwitz, Johann Berger, Alexey Troitsky, Yuri Averbakh, and Reuben Fine. Ken Thompson, Eugene Nalimov, and other computer scientists have contributed by constructing endgame tablebases.

Some endgame books are general works about many different kinds of endgames whereas others are limited to specific endgames such as rook endgames or pawnless endgames. Most books are one volume (of varying size), but there are large multi-volume works. Most books cover endgames in which the proper course of action (see optimal play) has been analyzed in detail. However, an increasing number of books are about endgame strategy, where exact analysis is not currently possible, due to the presence of more pieces. These endgame strategy books fill the gap from the end of the middlegame to where the other type of books takes over.

== History of endgame literature ==
The study of a few practical endgames are found in Arabic manuscripts from the twelfth and thirteenth centuries. However, these are from before the rule of pawn promotion, so most are of little value today. A thirteenth-century Latin book by an unknown author examined the endgame of a knight versus a pawn, and formed the basis of later work by Alexey Troitsky in the twentieth century. In the fifteenth and sixteenth centuries a few types of endgames were studied, and opposition was known.

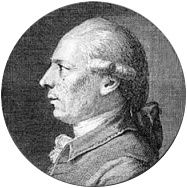
Philidor (1726–1795)

Ruy López de Segura's 1561 book contained eight paragraphs on endgames. It used the Spanish rules in effect at the time, so a stalemate and baring the opponent's king were half-wins. In 1617 Pietro Carrera published knowledge of several types of endgames, including queen versus two bishops, two rooks versus a rook and a knight, and two rooks versus a rook and a bishop. Several writers published books developing endgame theory: Gioachino Greco in 1624, Philipp Stamma in 1737, and François-André Philidor in 1749. In 1634 Alessandro Salvio analyzed endgames, including a key position in rook endgames. Philidor's book contained much more endgame analysis than earlier books. The first edition analyzed the rook and bishop versus rook endgame. Later editions covered the bishop and knight checkmate, rook and pawn versus bishop, queen versus rook and pawn, queen versus rook, rook and pawn versus rook (including the Philidor position), queen and pawn versus queen, queen versus pawn on the seventh rank, knight versus pawn, two pawns versus one pawn, and two isolated pawns versus two connected pawns.

Lolli 1763

Position: d8 white king, b7 black king, c6 black bishop, d6 black bishop, a5 white queen

The only mutual zugzwang position with this material. White to move draws; Black to move loses.

In the eighteenth century important books were written by Italians (the "Modenese Masters") Domenico Lorenzo Ponziani, Ercole del Rio (1750), and Giambattista Lolli (1763). Lolli's book was based on del Rio's work and was one of the most important for the next 90 years. He studied the endgame of a queen versus two bishops and agreed with the earlier opinion of Salvio that it was generally a draw. Later this was overturned by computer endgame tablebases, when Ken Thompson found a 71-move solution. However, Lolli did find the unique position of mutual zugzwang in this endgame (see diagram). Lolli's 315-page book was the first giving practical research. His material came from several sources, including analysis by Philidor.

In 1766 Carlo Cozio published analysis of 127 endgame positions, but it was not a practical handbook. In 1851 Bernhard Horwitz and Josef Kling published Chess Studies, or endings of games, which contained 427 positions. In 1884 Horwitz added more than fifty positions to the book, retitled it Chess Studies and End-Games, and completely omitted Kling's name. Other important books were Fins de parties d'echecs by Phillipe Ambroise Durand and Jean-Louis Preti in 1871, and Teoria e pratica del giuoco degli scacchi by Signor Salvioli in 1877. Horwitz and Kling's analysis of the endgame of two bishops versus a knight had been questioned, and was eventually overturned by computer databases (see pawnless chess endgame). In 1864 Alfred Crosskill published analysis of the endgame of rook and bishop versus rook, an endgame that has been studied at least as far back as Philidor in 1749.

Howard Staunton in The Chess-Player's Handbook, originally published in 1847, included almost 100 pages of analysis of endgames. His analysis of the very rare rook versus three minor pieces endgame is surprisingly sophisticated. Staunton wrote, "Three minor Pieces are much stronger than a Rook, and in cases where two of them are Bishops will usually win without much difficulty, because the player of the Rook is certain to be compelled to lose him for one of his adversary's Pieces. If, however, there are two Knights and one Bishop opposed to a Rook, the latter may generally be exchanged for the Bishop, and as two Knights are insufficient of themselves to force checkmate, the game will be drawn." Writing shortly before Staunton, George Walker reached the same conclusions. Modern-day endgame tablebases confirm Walker and Staunton's assessments of both endings. Yet Reuben Fine, 94 years after Staunton, erroneously wrote in Basic Chess Endings that both types of rook versus three minor piece endings "are theoretically drawn". Grandmaster Pal Benko, an endgame authority and like Fine a world-class player at his peak, perpetuated Fine's error in his 2003 revision of Basic Chess Endings. Grandmaster Andrew Soltis in a 2004 book expressly disagreed with Staunton, claiming that rook versus two bishops and knight is drawn with correct play. Endgame tablebases had already proven that Staunton was correct, and Soltis wrong, although it can take up to 68 moves to win.

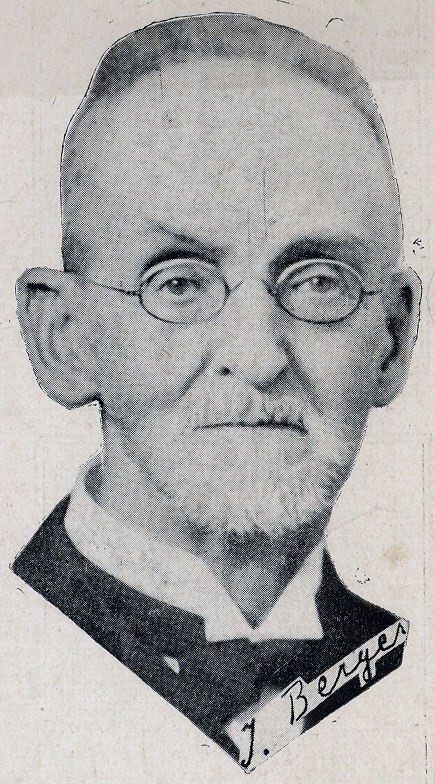
Johann Berger (1845–1933)

The modern period of chess endgame books begins with Theorie und Praxis der Endspiele (Theory and practice of the Endgame) by Johann Berger. This was published in 1891, revised in 1922, and supplemented in 1933. This was the standard work on practical endgames for decades. Many later books were based on Berger's book. Edward Freeborough wrote a 130-page book of analysis of the queen versus rook endgame, The Chess Ending, King & Queen against King & Rook, which was published in 1895. Henri Rinck (1870–1952) was a specialist in pawnless endgames and A. A. Troitsky (1866–1942) is famous for his analysis of two knights versus a pawn. In 1927 Ilya Rabinovich published a comprehensive book in Russian titled The Endgame, which was designed for teaching. An updated version appeared in 1938. (An English version of the second edition was published in 2012 as The Russian Endgame Handbook.) Eugene Znosko-Borovsky published How to Play Chess Endings in 1940.

In 1941, Reuben Fine published Basic Chess Endings, an attempt to collect all practical endgame knowledge into one volume. It is still useful today and has been revised by Pal Benko. Half of André Chéron's (1895–1980) book Traite Complet d'Echecs was about the endgame, and later he wrote Nouveau Traite Complet d'Echecs, which was a large book about the endgame. He later expanded that into the four-volume Lehr- und Handbuch der Endspiele in German, which was translated from the 1952 version in French. This was a major work for endgame studies but was not designed for the practical player.

Yuri Averbakh published a monumental set of books in Russian in 1956. The works were first published in English as several individual books (Pawn Endings, Bishop Endings, Knight Endings, Bishop v. Knight Endings, Rook Endings, Queen and Pawn Endings, Queen v. Rook/Minor Piece Endings, Rook v. Minor Piece Endings) and later collected into the five-volume Comprehensive Chess Endings. It was also published in other languages. Bobby Fischer had these books sent to him during his World Championship match. World Champion Max Euwe published the comprehensive eight-volume Das Endspiel in 1957.

Some other major endgame books are Rook Endings by Grigory Levenfish and Vasily Smyslov (1971), Practical Chess Endings by Paul Keres (1973), Fundamental Chess Endings by Karsten Müller and Frank Lamprecht (2001), Dvoretsky's Endgame Manual by Mark Dvoretsky (2003), and Silman's Complete Endgame Course by Jeremy Silman (2007).

== Annotated bibliography ==
Here are some books on chess endgames in English.

=== Small, general one-volume books ===
Practical Chess Endings by Paul Keres, 1981 paperback edition

- Winning Chess Endings, by Yasser Seirawan, 2003, Everyman Chess. ISBN 1-85744-348-9. A good introductory book.
- Improve Your Endgame Play, by Glenn Flear, 2000, Everyman Chess. ISBN 1-85744-246-6. A good introductory book.
- Just the Facts!: Winning Endgame Knowledge in One Volume, Lev Alburt and Nikolai Krogius, 2000, Newmarket Press. ISBN 1-889323-15-2. A good introductory book.
- Essential Chess Endings: the Tournament Player's Guide, by James Howell, 1997, Batsford. ISBN 0-7134-8189-7. A small but comprehensive book.
- Grandmaster Secrets: Endings, by Andrew Soltis, 1997, 2003, Thinker's Press, ISBN 0-938650-66-1. An elementary book.
- Pandolfini's Endgame Course, by Bruce Pandolfini, 1988, Fireside, ISBN 0-671-65688-0. Many short elementary endgame lessons.
- Chess Endings Made Simple: How to Approach the Endgame with Confidence, by Ian Snape, 2003, Gambit Publications, ISBN 1-901983-97-8
- Chess Endings: Essential Knowledge, by Yuri Averbakh, 1966, 1993, Everyman Chess. ISBN 1-85744-022-6. Contains some elementary material and a few more advanced topics, but is not comprehensive.
- Practical Chess Endings, by Paul Keres, 1973, R.H.M. Press. ISBN 0-89058-028-6. Reprinted by Batsford in 2018 ISBN 978-1-84994-495-3 (now using algebraic notation).
- A Pocket Guide to Chess Endgames, by David Hooper, 1970, Bell & Hyman. ISBN 0-7135-1761-1. Small yet relatively comprehensive book.
- A Guide to Chess Endings, by Dr. Max Euwe and David Hooper, 1959, 1976, Dover. ISBN 0-486-23332-4. Analysis of positions of many types, but little overall discussion of principles.
- Practical Chess Endings, by Irving Chernev, 1961, Dover. ISBN 0-486-22208-X. A collection of 300 endgame studies, but little overall discussion of principles.
- Concise Chess Endings, by Neil McDonald, 2002, Everyman Chess. ISBN 978-1-85744-313-4. Basic material in a physically small book.
- The Endgame, by Marat Makarov, 2007, Chess Stars, ISBN 978-954-8782-63-0. The basic material.
- How to Win in the Chess Endings, by I. A. Horowitz, 1957, David McKay.
- Chess Endgames for Kids, by Karsten Müller 2015, Gambit Publications. A good introductory book (and not just for kids).

=== Large, more comprehensive one-volume books ===
Basic Chess Endings has appeared hardbound and softbound with several covers. This one is from 1971.

- Basic Chess Endings, by Reuben Fine and Pal Benko, 1941, 2003, McKay. ISBN 0-8129-3493-8. The first modern endgame book in English. A classic book by Fine in 1941 – revised by Benko in 2003.
- Fundamental Chess Endings, by Karsten Müller and Frank Lamprecht, 2001, Gambit Publications. ISBN 1-901983-53-6. Comprehensive and modern.
- Dvoretsky's Endgame Manual, second edition, by Mark Dvoretsky, 2006, Russel Enterprises. ISBN 1-888690-28-3. A modern manual book by a noted chess teacher.
- Silman's Complete Endgame Course: From Beginner To Master, Jeremy Silman, 2007, Siles Press, ISBN 1-890085-10-3. Has a unique approach, presenting material in order of difficulty and the need to know of various classes of players. It starts with material for the absolute beginner and progresses up to master-level material.
- Practical Endgame Play - mastering the basics, Efstratios Grivas, 2008, Everyman Chess, ISBN 978-1-85744-556-5.
- Batsford Chess Endings, by Jon Speelman, Jon Tisdall, and Bob Wade, 1993, Batsford. ISBN 0-7134-4420-7. More of a catalog of positions and analysis with little discussion (probably out of print).
- The Russian Endgame Handbook, by Ilya Rabinovich. This is the 2012 English translation of the 1938 Russian book. ISBN 978-1-936277-41-4.

=== Multi-volume works ===
Works by Averbakh, individual books and Comprehensive Chess Endings

- Comprehensive Chess Endings, by Yuri Averbakh, et al., 1983. In five volumes. A detailed, advanced, and comprehensive look at various endings. Intended for players with a rating of roughly 1800 or higher. Published by Pergamon Press. The work originally appeared as a series of smaller books (e.g. Bishop Endings, Knight Endings, etc.). Out of print in book form, but available on computer CD-ROM.
  - Volume 1: Bishop endings/Knight endings, Yuri Averbakh and Vitaly Chekhover, ISBN 0-08-026900-1, 553 diagrams, 209 pages.
  - Volume 2: Bishop against knight, rook against minor piece, Yuri Averbakh, ISBN 0-08-026902-8, 631 diagrams, 245 pages.
  - Volume 3: Queen and pawn endings, queen versus rook, queen versus minor piece, Yuri Averbakh, Vitaly Chekhover, and V. Henkin, ISBN 0-08-026904-4, 734 diagrams, 306 pages.
  - Volume 4: Pawn endings, Yuri Averbakh and Ilya Maizelis, ISBN 0-08-026906-0, 768 diagrams, 291 pages.
  - Volume 5: Rook endings, Yuri Averbakh and Nikolai Kopayev, ISBN 0-08-026908-7, 808 diagrams, 322 pages.
- Encyclopedia of Chess Endings, Šahovski informator (Chess Informant), edited by Aleksandar Matanović. It contains no text (only moves with a few codes) and is aimed at experts and masters. It was published in five volumes:
1. pawn endgames, 1610 diagrammed positions
2. rook and pawn, 1727 positions
3. rook and minor pieces, 1746 positions
4. queen (including endings with rooks and minor pieces). 1800 positions
5. minor pieces, 2017 positions.
- Theory and Practice of Chess Endings, by Alexander Panchenko. Two small volumes (318 positions/160 pages and 356 positions/176 pages).
- Nunn's Chess Endings, by John Nunn, 2010, two volumes. More in-depth companion to his Understanding Chess Endgames and covers positions from games.
  - Volume 1: pawn endings, knight endings, bishop endings, knight vs. bishop endings, queen endings, 319 pages.
  - Volume 2: rook endings, rook and minor piece endings, 351 pages.

=== Books on specific endings ===
==== Pawn endings ====
- Starting Out: Pawn Endings, by Glenn Flear, 2004, Everyman Chess. ISBN 1-85744-362-4. A good book for advancing and intermediate players.
- Secrets of Pawn Endings, by Karsten Müller and Frank Lamprecht, 2007, Gambit. (Reissue of 2000 book by Everyman Chess, with corrections.) ISBN 978-1-904600-88-6. An in-depth book for king and pawn endgames.
- Comprehensive Chess Endings: Pawn Endings, volume 4, by Yuri Averbakh and Ilya Maizelis, see above.
- 1000 Pawn Endings, by József Pintér, 2006, ISBN 963-87170-0-9. Positions (mostly from games but some studies) and moves, no text.
- One Pawn Saves the Day: A World Champion's Favorite Studies, by Sergei Tkachenko, 2017, Limited Liability Company Elk and Ruby Publishing House ISBN 5-950-04334-0. 100 studies whose common theme is that white ends up with just one pawn in the finale, yet manages to win or draw.
- Fishbein, Alexander (1993), King and Pawn Endings, American Chess Promotions, ISBN 0-939298-39-2

==== Rook endings ====
Cover of the 1975 hardback printing of Rook Endings.

- Starting Out: Rook Endgames (2004). Chris Ward, Everyman Chess. ISBN 1-85744-374-8. A good book for advancing and intermediate players.
- The Survival Guide to Rook Endings, John Emms, 2008. Gambit. ISBN 978-1-904600-94-7. (Reissue of 1999 book by Everyman Chess, with corrections.) An in-depth book for rook and pawn endgames.
- Practical Rook Endings, by Victor Korchnoi, 1999, 2002, Olms. ISBN 3-283-00401-3. An introductory chapter on fundamental positions followed by detailed analysis of fourteen rook endgames from his actual games.
- Rook Endings, by Grigory Levenfish and Vasily Smyslov, 1971, Batsford. ISBN 0-7134-0449-3. Considered a classic study of rook and pawn endings, is out of print.
- Secrets of Rook Endings, by John Nunn, 1992, 1999, Gambit Publications. ISBN 1-901983-18-8. Goes deeply into the intricate details of the ending of a king, one rook, and one pawn versus a king and one rook – culled from a computer endgame tablebase. Considers positions based on every starting position of the pawn.
- Practical Rook Endings, by Edmar Mednis, 1982, Chess Enterprises. ISBN 0-931462-16-9. A small book on rook and pawn endgames.
- One Rook Saves the Day: A World Champion's Favorite Studies, by Sergei Tkachenko, 2017, Limited Liability Company Elk and Ruby Publishing House ISBN 5-950-04337-5. 100 studies whose common theme is that white ends up with just one rook in the finale, yet manages to win or draw.
- Minev, Nikolay (2004), A Practical Guide to Rook Endgames, Russell Enterprises, ISBN 1-888690-22-4
- Comprehensive Chess Endings: Rook Endings, volume 5, by Yuri Averbakh and Nikolai Kopayev, see above.
- 1000 Rook Endings, by József Pintér, 2007, ISBN 978-963-9750-00-5. Positions (mostly from games but some studies) and moves, no text.

==== Minor piece endings ====
- Starting Out: Minor Piece Endgames, by John Emms, 2004, Everyman Chess, ISBN 1-85744-359-4. A good book for advancing and intermediate players.
- Comprehensive Chess Endings: Bishop Endings/Knight Endings, volume 1, by Yuri Averbakh and Vitaly Chekhover, see above.
- Secrets of Minor-Piece Endings, by John Nunn, Batsford. A very detailed look at the endgames of one minor piece and a pawn versus one minor piece, plus two bishops versus one knight (with no pawns), based on computer tablebase, ISBN 0-8050-4228-8.
- One Knight Saves the Day: A World Champion's Favorite Studies, by Sergei Tkachenko, 2017, Limited Liability Company Elk and Ruby Publishing House ISBN 5-950-04335-9. 100 studies whose common theme is that white ends up with just one knight in the finale, yet manages to win or draw.
- One Bishop Saves the Day: A World Champion's Favorite Studies, by Sergei Tkachenko, 2017, Limited Liability Company Elk and Ruby Publishing House ISBN 5-950-04336-7. 100 studies whose common theme is that white ends up with just one bishop in the finale, yet manages to win or draw.
- 1000 Minor Piece Endings, by József Pintér, 2007. Positions (mostly from games but some studies) and moves, no text.
- Mednis, Edmar (1990), Practical Bishop Endings, Chess Enterprises, ISBN 0-945470-04-5
- Mednis, Edmar (1993), Practical Knight Endings, Chess Enterprises, ISBN 0-945470-35-5

==== Other endings ====
- Secrets of Pawnless Endings, by John Nunn, 1994, 2002, Gambit Publications. ISBN 1-901983-65-X. A very detailed look at relatively rare critical endings without pawns, based on computer tablebase.
- Polak, Tomas (2008), Rook Against Two Pieces, Sachy

=== Endgame strategy ===
Strategic endgames are endgames that begin at the end of the middlegame. Usually each player has several pieces, making the position too difficult to analyze in detail. Therefore, it is usually not certain what the outcome should be or what is the best line of play.

- Hansen, Lars Bo (2006), Secrets of Chess Endgame Strategy, Gambit, ISBN 1-904600-44-1
- Shereshevsky, Mikhail (1994), Endgame Strategy
- Flear, Glenn (2007), Practical Endgame Play - beyond the basics: the definitive guide to the endgames that really matter, Everyman Chess, ISBN 978-1-85744-555-8 A follow-up companion to Practical Endgame Play by Grivas.
- Müller, Karsten; Pajeken, Wolfgang (2008), How to Play Chess Endgames, Gambit Publications, ISBN 978-1-904600-86-2 A follow-up companion to Fundamental Chess Endings by Müller and Lamprecht.

=== Endgames by specific players ===
- Capablanca's Best Chess Endings: 60 Complete Games, by Irving Chernev, 1978, Dover. ISBN 0-486-24249-8. Complete games with good endgame lessons.
- Vasily Smyslov: Endgame Virtuoso, by Vasily Smyslov, 1997, Everyman Chess. ISBN 1-85744-198-2. Endings plus some complete games that illustrate endgames.
- Károlyi, Tibor; Aplin, Nick (2007), Endgame Virtuoso Anatoly Karpov, New In Chess, ISBN 978-90-5691-202-4. Contains 105 of his best games, with annotations of the endgames.
- Kaufeld, Jurgen; Kern, Guido (2011), Grandmaster Chess Strategy: What amateurs can learn from Ulf Andersson's positional masterpieces, New in Chess, ISBN 978-90-5691-346-5 Has four chapters of endgames by Ulf Andersson.

=== Miscellaneous endgame books ===
- Mastering the Endgame, by Glenn Flear, 2001, Everyman Chess. ISBN 1-85744-233-4. A good follow-up to the elementary books.
- Six Hundred Endings, by Lajos Portisch and Balázs Sárközy, 1981, Pergamon Press. ISBN 0-08-024137-9. Examines specific endgames from actual games and studies, categorized by the basic type of ending.
- Winning Endgame Technique, by Alexander Beliavsky and Adrian Mikhalchishin, 1995, Batsford, ISBN 0-7134-7512-9. Explores several key types of endgames.
- Winning Endgame Strategy, by Alexander Beliavsky and Adrian Mikhalchishin, 2000, Batsford, ISBN 0-7134-8446-2.
- Modern Endgame Practice, by Alexander Beliavsky and Adrian Mikhalchishin, 2003, Batsford, ISBN 0-7134-8740-2.
- Endgame Secrets: How to plan in the endgame in chess, by Christopher Lutz, 1999, Batsford. ISBN 0-7134-8165-X. Examines forty-five endgames from actual play.
- Analysing the Endgame, by Jonathan Speelman, 1981, Arco Chess Library. ISBN 0-668-05242-2. Analysis of some basic endgames and some more complex ones. Can be difficult going.
- Endgame Preparation, by Jon Speelman, 1981, Batsford. ISBN 0-7134-4000-7 (limp) ISBN 0-7134-3999-8 (cased). Covers some selected endgame topics. Can be difficult going.
- C.J.S. Purdy On the Endgame, by Cecil Purdy, 2003, Thinker's Press, ISBN 1-888710-03-9 - collection of various articles, not a full encyclopedia.
- 101 Chess Endgame Tips: Golden nuggets of endgame wisdom, by Stephen Giddins, 2007, Gambit, ISBN 978-1-904600-66-4
- Giddins, Steve (2012), The Greatest Ever Chess Endgames, Everyman Chess, ISBN 978-1-85744-694-4
- Van Perlo's Endgame Tactics, by Gerardus C. van Perlo, 2006, New In Chess, ISBN 978-90-5691-168-3
- Practical Endgame Play, by Neil McDonald, 1996, Cadogan. ISBN 978-1-85744-176-5.
- Practical Endgame Lessons, by Edmar Mednis, McKay.
- Mednis, Edmar (1987), Questions and Answers on Practical Endgame Play, Chess Enterprises, ISBN 0-931462-69-X
- Griffiths, Peter (1992), Exploring the Endgame, American Chess Promotions, ISBN 0-939298-83-X Fifty-four annotated endgames from games, most give the complete game.
- Griffiths, P.C. (1976), The Endgame: in modern theory and practice, G. Bell & Sons, ISBN 0-7135-1953-3 Not comprehensive but mostly practical endgames from tournament games
- de la Villa, Jesús (2008), 100 Endgames You Must Know, New in Chess, ISBN 978-90-5691-244-4 Subtitle: "Vital Lessons for Every Chess Player"
- de la Villa, Jesús (2019), The 100 Endgames You Must Know Workbook, New in Chess, ISBN 978-90-5691-817-0
- de la Villa, Jesús (2021), 100 Endgame Patterns You Must Know, New in Chess, ISBN 978-90-5691-972-6
- How to Play Chess Endings, Eugene Znosko-Borovsky, 1940
- Dvoretsky, Mark; Yusupov, Artur (2008), Secrets of Endgame Technique, Olms, ISBN 978-3-283-00517-7
- Silman, Jeremy (1992), Essential Chess Endings Explained Move by Move. Volume one: Novice through Intermediate (2nd ed.), Chess Digest, ISBN 0-87568-172-7
- Smith, Ken (1992), Essential Chess Endings Explained Move by Move. Volume two: Intermediate through Master, Chess Digest, ISBN 0-87568-210-3
- Donaldson, John (1995), Essential Chess Endings for Advanced Players, Chess Digest, ISBN 0-87568-263-4
- Angos, Alex (2005), You Move ... I Win!: A Lesson in Zugzwang, Thinkers' Press, Inc., ISBN 978-1-888710-18-2 About zugzwang positions, almost entirely in the endgame.
- Prandstetter, Eduard; Balashov, Yuri (1992), Basic Endgames, Prague Chess Agency, ISBN 80-901056-0-2
- Benko, Pal (2007), Pal Benko's Endgame Laboratory, Ishi Press, ISBN 978-0-923891-88-6 A collection of Benko's Chess Life articles 1981-86
- Pandolfini, Bruce (2009), Endgame Workshop: Principles for the Practical Player, Russell Enterprises, ISBN 978-1-888690-53-8
- Nunn, John (2009), Understanding Chess Endgames, Gambit Publications, ISBN 978-1-906454-11-1
- Mednis, Edmar; Crouch, Colin (1992), Rate Your Endgame, Cadogan, ISBN 978-1-85744-174-1 Based on Practical Endgame Lessons by Mednis, it is expanded and includes exercises
- Dvoretsky, Mark (2003), School of Chess Excellence 1: Endgame Analysis, Olms, ISBN 978-3-283-00416-3 Deep analysis of some endgames. Is in three parts: analysis of adjourned positions, endgame knowledge, and endgame studies.

=== Magazines ===
- EG magazine

=== Computer ===
- Huberman (Liskov), Barbara Jane (1968), A program to play chess end games, Stanford University Department of Computer Science, Technical Report CS 106, Stanford Artificial Intelligence Project Memo AI-65
- Stiller, Lewis (1996), Multilinear Algebra and Chess Endgames (PDF), Berkeley, California: Mathematical Sciences Research Institute, Games of No Chance, MSRI Publications, Volume 29

== See also ==
- Chess theory
- Chess endgame
- List of chess books
- Chess opening books
