= Queen and pawn =

Queen and pawn may refer to:

- Queen versus pawn endgame
- Queen and pawn versus queen endgame
