= Paul Keres Memorial Tournament =

Chess tournament in Estonia and Canada

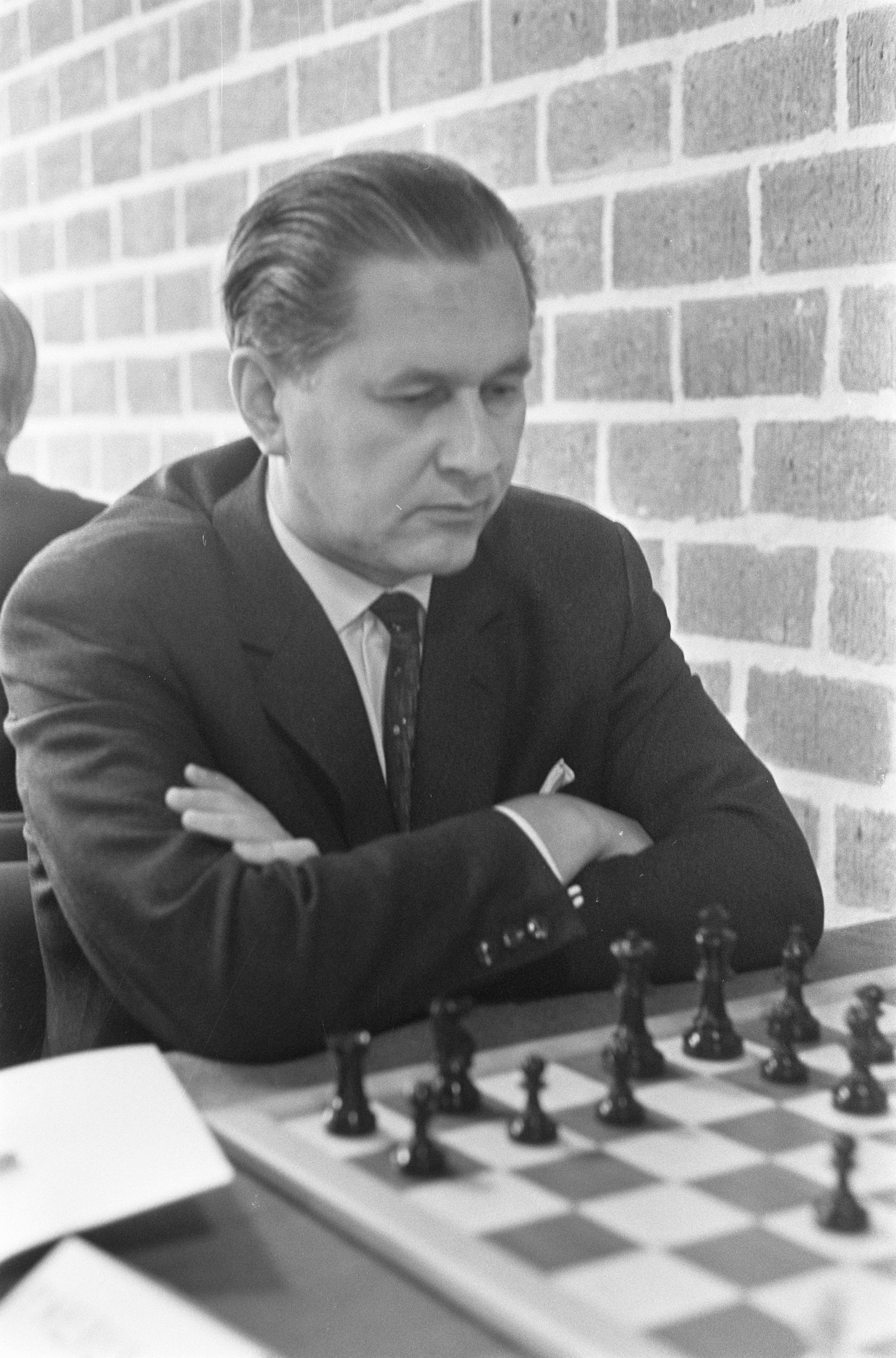
Paul Keres

The Paul Keres Memorial Tournament is a chess tournament played in honour of chess grandmaster Paul Keres (1916–1975). It usually takes place in Vancouver, Canada and Tallinn, Estonia.

An annual international chess tournament has been held in Tallinn every other year since 1969. Keres won this tournament in 1971 and 1975. Starting in 1977 after Keres' death, it has been called the Paul Keres Memorial Tournament. From 1991, the tournament has been held yearly and changed into a rapid event. From 1999 this tournament also had a women's section. In the past twenty years, apart from this rapid tournament, several other memorial tournaments have been played in honour of Keres.

In 1975, Keres won a tournament in Vancouver. It was his last tournament he would ever play in, as on his way back to his native Estonia, he died from a heart attack. There has been an annual memorial tournament in Vancouver ever since.

== Tallinn ==
=== Tallinn International ===
The Tallinn International has been held every other year from 1969 to 1989. It was named after Keres from 1977.

#	Year	Winner
1	1969	Leonid Stein
2	1971	Mikhail Tal; Paul Keres
3	1973	Mikhail Tal
4	1975	Paul Keres
5	1977	Mikhail Tal
6	1979	Tigran Petrosian
7	1981	Mikhail Tal
8	1983	Mikhail Tal; Rafael Vaganian
9	1985	Sergey Dolmatov
10	1987	Mikhail Gurevich
11	1989	Georgy Timoshenko; Lembit Oll; Jaan Ehlvest

=== Tallinn Rapid ===
From 1991 the Tallinn international has been replaced by an annual rapid tournament. From 1999, the tournament has had a separate women's section.

#	Year	Winner	Women's section
1	1991	Anto Remmel	
2	1992	Leonid Yudasin	
3	1993	Jaan Ehlvest	
4	1994	Viktor Korchnoi	
5	1995	Lembit Oll	
6	1996	Vassily Ivanchuk	
7	1997	Viktor Gavrikov	
8	1998	Suat Atalık; Lembit Oll	
9	1999	Viktor Gavrikov	Tatiana Stepovaia
10	2000	Vassily Ivanchuk	Tatiana Stepovaia
11	2001	Jan Timman	Viktorija Čmilytė
12	2002	Viktor Gavrikov	Dana Reizniece
13	2003	Alexander Morozevich	Pia Cramling
14	2004	Alexei Shirov	Maia Chiburdanidze
15	2005	Alexei Shirov	Ekaterina Kovalevskaya
16	2006	Vassily Ivanchuk; Anatoly Karpov; Rustam Kasimdzhanov	Ilze Bērziņa
18	2008	Vladimir Malakhov	Ilze Bērziņa; Viktorija Čmilytė
19	2009	Alexey Dreev; Vasily Yemelin	Elisabeth Pähtz
20	2011	Alexei Shirov	
21	2012	Alexei Shirov	
22	2013	Alexei Shirov	
23	2014	Igor Kovalenko	
24	2015	Sergei Tiviakov	
25	2016	Igor Kovalenko	

=== Keres Memorial Festival ===
In the 1990s there have been several Keres memorials in Tallinn which were played at regular time control. These tournaments seem to have been held irregularly. At present there is an annual Keres Memorial Festival which started in 2004 with a special rapid tournament, where Viswanathan Anand emerged as a winner, followed by a regular tournament. The winners of the regular tournament for 2004 and subsequent years are listed below. The field of these tournaments has been notably weaker than that of the rapid tournaments.

Year	Winner
2004	Kaido Külaots; Artem Smirnov
2005	Meelis Kanep
2006	Mikhail Rytshagov
2007	Georgy Timoshenko
2008	Vasily Yemelin
2010	Olav Sepp
2014	Alexandre Danin

== Vancouver ==
The tournament in Vancouver has been played ever since Keres won it in 1975. It was Keres' final tournament, as he died shortly thereafter.

#	Year	Winner
	1975	Paul Keres
1	1976	James Tarjan
2	1977	John Watson
3	1978	Robert Zuk
4	1979	Peter Biyiasas; John Grefe; James McCormick
5	1980	Viktors Pupols
6	1981	John Donaldson; Ray Fasano
7	1982	John Donaldson; Eric Tangborn
8	1983	John Donaldson
9	1984	Leon Piasetski; Gordon Taylor; Jeremy Silman; Robert Zuk
10	1985	John Donaldson; Lionel Joyner; John Braley
11	1986	Kevin Spraggett
12	1987	Tom O'Donnell
13	1988	Alex Kuznecov; Kevin Spraggett
14	1989	Jüri Vetemaa
15	1990	Jonathan Berry; John Donaldson
16	1991	Ľubomír Ftáčnik
17	1992	Ľubomír Ftáčnik
18	1993	Igor Štohl
19	1994	Jonathan Berry; Jüri Vetemaa; Gary Basanta
20	1995	John Hallam; Jüri Vetemaa; Yan Teplitsky
21	1996	Georgi Orlov
22	1997	Yan Teplitsky
23	1998	Kevin Spraggett
24	1999	Yan Teplitsky; Georgi Orlov; Jack Yoos
25	2000	Vladimir Epishin
26	2001	Georgi Orlov
27	2002	Fanhao Meng; Georgi Orlov; Jack Yoos; Besnik Beqo
28	2003	Georgi Orlov
29	2004	Georgi Orlov
30	2005	Jack Yoos
31	2006	Alfred Pechisker
32	2007	Georgi Orlov
33	2008	Georgi Orlov; Bindi Cheng
34	2009	Jack Yoos
35	2010	Jack Yoos; Georgi Orlov; Katerina Rohonyan; Manuel Rivas Pastor; Roman Jiganchine
36	2011	Georgi Orlov; Maxim Doroshenko
37	2012	Jack Yoos
38	2013	Georgi Orlov
39	2014	Georgi Orlov
40	2015	Jason Cao
41	2016	Tanraj Sohal
42	2017	Tanraj Sohal
43	2018	Tanraj Sohal, Stanislav Kriventsov
44	2019	Georgi Orlov, Raymond Kaufman
45	2021	Peter Yong Qiu
46	2022	Dietmar Kolbus; Georgi Orlov; Jorge Nunez Asencio; Raymond Kaufman; Keith MacKinnon
47	2023	Georgi Orlov, Neil Doknjas
48	2024	Neil Doknjas; Gergely-Andras-Gyula Szabo
49	2025	Neil Doknjas, Yidong Chen
50	2026	Vladimir Belous, Megan Lee
