= Vetemaa =

Vetemaa is an Estonian surname. Notable people with the surname include:

- Enn Vetemaa (1936–2017), Estonian writer
- Jüri Vetemaa (1956–2003), Estonian chess player and chess journalist
