= Queen and pawn versus queen endgame =

Chess endgame where both sides have a queen and one side has an extra pawn

Müller & Lamprecht, diagram 9.12A

Position: f7 white queen, g7 white king, c6 black king, h5 white pawn, e2 black queen

White to play wins; Black to play draws

The queen and pawn versus queen endgame is a chess endgame in which both sides have a queen and one side has a pawn, which one tries to promote. It is very complicated and difficult to play. Cross-checks are often used as a device to win the game by forcing the exchange of queens. It is almost always a draw if the defending king is in front of the pawn.

Karsten Müller and Frank Lamprecht say that this endgame occurs quite frequently but Mark Dvoretsky says that it occurs quite seldom. This is the second most common "piece and pawn versus piece" endgame, next to the rook and pawn versus rook endgame.

== History ==
Before about 1940, all that was known about this endgame was based on analysis of a few positions from the time of Philidor (1726–95). Theorists and players gradually started to analyze the endgame.

The endgame occurred in a 1944 game between Botvinnik and Ravinsky (moves given below) and much analysis followed. Paul Keres published an extensive analysis in 1947–49, which was put to the test in the 1954 game between Botvinnik and Minev (below). Minev followed the suggestions of Keres and lost – revealing major flaws in the analysis. In 1955, Shakhmaty v SSSR launched a competition for the best analysis of this endgame. Several theorists had contributed useful analysis by the time the competition ended four years later, in 1959. Early analysts believed that the ending was almost always drawn with a knight pawn, but Yuri Averbakh questioned that in the 1950s. Averbakh, working with previous analysis, published his extensive analysis in 1962.

A complete analysis was not done until the advent of endgame tablebases, which showed that more positions can be won than was previously thought. Before tablebases, Averbakh provided the best coverage, but the 70 pages of analysis in Comprehensive Chess Endgames mainly covered only simple positions with the pawn already on the seventh rank. John Nunn wrote three books based on the most important endgames in the five-piece endgame tablebases but omitted this endgame because "... it proved too hard to understand". He also commented "This is the trickiest of all five-man endings, which is unfortunate as it is one of the most common to arise in practice."

== General considerations ==
According to Reuben Fine and Pal Benko, this ending is a draw unless the pawn is a bishop pawn or a central pawn (i.e. king pawn or queen pawn) and the pawn is in the seventh rank and is supported by its king. If the defending king can get in front of the pawn, the game is a draw; otherwise it is best for the defender to keep their king far away from the pawn. The defender should keep checking until they run out of checks, and then, if possible, pin the pawn. Based on computer analysis, Müller and Lamprecht give a different description. According to them, normally the defending king needs to be in front of the pawn. A rook pawn or knight pawn is a theoretical draw if the defending king is in front or near the pawn or if the king is in the corner opposite the pawn's promotion square. A knight pawn has more practical winning chances than a rook pawn. A bishop pawn or central pawn is a win if the defending king is not in front of the pawn. A bishop pawn has better winning chances than a central pawn. The position of the defending king is especially important. John Nunn states that analysis since Fine's initial work, published in his 1941 tome Basic Chess Endings, has shown that there are many more winning positions than were known at that time (ignoring the fifty-move rule in some cases). Wins by the side with the pawn take up to 59 moves. A cross-check may be necessary to win.

Edmar Mednis gave this breakdown when the defending king is not able to help:

- A bishop pawn is the best pawn to have. It is relatively easy to advance and is a win once it reaches the seventh rank.
- A central pawn wins if it reaches the seventh rank, but it is difficult to get it there. Even if the pawn reaches the sixth rank, the position is usually a draw.
- A knight pawn is relatively easy to get to the seventh rank, but the position may be a theoretical draw.
- Positions with rook pawns are theoretical draws, but in practice it may be difficult to draw.

John Nunn gives this summary for the defense:

- with a central pawn, the defense has two possibilities: get the king in front of the pawn or get the king to corner nearest to the pawn's promotion square
- with a bishop pawn, the defender's only chance is to get the king in front of the pawn
- with a knight pawn, the defender must get the king in front of the pawn or in the corner furthest from the promotion square
- a rook pawn is generally a draw and the defensive guidelines are the same as for a knight pawn.

Naturally, the less advanced the pawn is, the better the defensive chances.

=== Rook pawn ===
Nunn, 2007, p. 150

Position: f8 white circle, g8 black circle, h8 black circle, g7 white circle, h7 black circle, a6 white circle, f6 white circle, g6 white circle, h6 white circle, a5 white pawn, a4 white king, b3 white queen, a2 black circle, b2 black circle, a1 white circle, b1 black circle, c1 black queen

Black king on white dots: win with White to move, draw with Black to move; on black dots – win with either to move; other squares – draw

In 1985 the chess computer Belle completed the endgame tablebase for this ending. The rook pawn is the most important for actual games since it arises the most frequently, since it is the least likely pawn to have been exchanged. A rook pawn needs to be on at least the sixth rank to have decent winning chances.

Mednis gave the following guidelines, based on his analysis of the tablebase. Assume that White has a pawn on the h-file.

To draw:

- The best area for the king is in the corner opposite the pawn's promotion square. This keeps it from blocking checks by its queen.
- When the white queen is centralized, the safest place for the black king is probably b3.
- Once the king is in the far corner it should stay there.
- At certain points the king can be on other squares and still draw, but it is much more difficult to play correctly.
- The queen should be centralized.
- The queen checks on the central squares for more flexibility on future moves.
- The queen checks in ways so that the white queen cannot be centralized.
- The queen is used to keep the king in front of its pawn.
- The queen is used to prevent the white queen from becoming active.
- If the queen is on e5 it will draw against a pawn on h7 and queen on g6 or f7 if the black king is in the far corner.
- The queen is kept active and in a flexible place. It will be more active on c2 than h7.
- The queen on h7 is often good enough to draw.

To win:

- The worst place for the king is in front of the pawn.
- There are two good places for the king:
  - to the side of the pawn, e.g. f7, f8, or e8.
  - close to the black king, which allows for counterchecks.
- The pawn is advanced to the seventh rank only if the queen is in place to prevent perpetual check.
- If the pawn is on h7, the best square for the queen is e4. In favorable circumstances, other squares (e.g. f5, d7) will also win.
Example of a long theoretical win involving a rook pawn.

Position: a7 black queen, a6 white pawn, h6 black king, a5 white queen, g1 white king

Position after ...Qa7+. Mate can be forced in 235 plies, but under the fifty-move rule the position is a draw.

=== Knight pawn ===
Nunn, 2007, p. 151

Position: d8 white circle, e8 black circle, f8 black circle, g8 black circle, h8 black circle, d7 white circle, e7 black circle, f7 black circle, g7 black circle, h7 black circle, d6 white circle, e6 black circle, f6 black circle, g6 black circle, h6 black circle, b5 white pawn, d5 black circle, e5 black circle, f5 black circle, g5 black circle, h5 white circle, b4 white king, d4 black circle, e4 black circle, f4 white circle, g4 white circle, h4 white circle, c3 white queen, d3 black circle, a2 white circle, b2 black circle, c2 black circle, d2 black circle, e2 white circle, a1 black circle, b1 black circle, c1 black circle, d1 black queen

A knight pawn should be on at least the fifth rank to have good winning chances. A knight pawn on the fifth rank has better winning chances than a rook pawn on the sixth rank. There are two reasons for this:

- the king has squares on the adjacent rook file to try to avoid perpetual check
- the exchange of queens is less likely to lead to a drawn king and pawn versus king endgame.

The best place for the defending king is in front of the pawn and the second-best place is in the corner opposite its promotion square.

=== Bishop pawn ===
Nunn, 2007, p. 152

Position: e8 white circle, f8 black circle, g8 black circle, h8 black circle, e7 white circle, f7 black circle, g7 black circle, h7 black circle, e6 black circle, f6 black circle, g6 black circle, h6 black circle, a5 white circle, c5 white pawn, e5 black circle, f5 black circle, g5 black circle, h5 black circle, a4 white circle, c4 white king, e4 black circle, f4 black circle, g4 black circle, h4 black circle, a3 black circle, d3 white queen, e3 black circle, f3 black circle, g3 black circle, h3 black circle, a2 black circle, b2 black circle, c2 black circle, d2 black circle, e2 black circle, f2 black circle, g2 black circle, h2 black circle, a1 black circle, b1 black circle, c1 black circle, d1 black circle, e1 black queen, f1 black circle, g1 black circle, h1 black circle

A bishop pawn offers the best winning chances. One reason is that there is no drawing zone in the opposite corner for the black king if the pawn is on at least the fourth rank. If the pawn is on the fifth rank the defender's chances are small unless the king is in front of the pawn. A pawn on the sixth rank wins unless the defending king is in front of the pawn.

=== Central pawn ===
Nunn, 2007, p. 152

Position: g8 white circle, h8 black circle, f7 white circle, g7 white circle, h7 black circle, f6 white circle, g6 white circle, h6 black circle, d5 white pawn, f5 white circle, g5 black circle, h5 black circle, a4 white circle, d4 white king, f4 black circle, g4 black circle, h4 black circle, e3 white queen, f3 black circle, g3 black circle, h3 black circle, a2 black circle, b2 black circle, c2 black circle, d2 black circle, e2 black circle, f2 black circle, g2 black queen, h2 black circle, a1 black circle, b1 black circle, c1 black circle, d1 black circle, e1 black circle, f1 black circle, g1 black circle, h1 black circle

A central pawn has better chances to win than a rook pawn or knight pawn, but not as good as a bishop pawn. As with the bishop pawn, there is no drawing zone for the defending king in the opposite corner. It is better for the defending king to be on the "short side" of the pawn rather than the "long side".

Example of a long theoretical win involving a central pawn.

Position: e8 white queen, h6 black queen, a2 black king, e2 white pawn, c1 white king

Position after ...Qh6+. Mate can be forced in 247 plies.

== Examples from games ==
=== Botvinnik vs. Ravinsky, Moscow (ch-USSR) 1944 ===
Botvinnik vs. Ravinsky, 1944

Position: a8 white queen, g7 black king, g6 white pawn, h5 white king, b1 black queen

After 86...b1=Q

Position: c8 black queen, g7 white pawn, g6 white king, a4 black king, f4 white queen

After 126.Qf4+

In 1944, Botvinnik played a perfect endgame against Grigory Ravinsky. The starting position, after 86...b1=Q, is winning.

87.Qa7+! [The only move that wins!] 87...Kf6 88.Qf7+ Ke5 89.Kh6 Qh1+ 90.Kg7 Kd4 91.Qf6+ Kc5 92.Kg8 Kb5 93.g7 Ka4 94.Kf7 Qh5+ 95.Ke7 Qc5+ 96.Qd6 Qg5+ 97.Kf8 Qf5+ 98.Ke8 Qh5+ 99.Kf8 Qf5+ 100.Ke7 Qg5+ 101.Qf6 Qc5+ 102.Kd7 Qd5+ 103.Kc7 Qa5+ 104.Kb7 Qb5+ 105.Qb6 Qd7+ 106.Qc7! Qb5+ 107.Ka7 Qd5 108.Kb8 Qg8+ 109.Ka7 Qd5 110.Qf4+ Ka5 111.Qf6 Qc5+ 112.Kb7 Qb5+ 113.Kc7 Qc5+ 114.Kd7 Qd5+ 115.Ke7 Qc5+ 116.Kf7 Qc4+ 117.Ke7 Qc5+ 118.Ke6 Qc8+ 119.Ke5 Qc3+ 120.Kf5 Qd3+ 121.Kg5 Qe3+ 122.Kg6 Qe8+ 123.Kh6 Qg8 124.Qe5+ Ka4 125.Kg6 Qc8 126.Qf4+ 1–0

A possible continuation, by endgame tablebases, could have been:

126...Kb3 127.Qf7+ Ka4 128.g8=Q Qg4+ 129.Kh6 Qh4+ 130.Kg7 Qg3+ 131.Kf8 Qd6+ 132.Qe7 Qh6+ 133.Qgg7 Qf4+ 134.Qgf7 Qb8+ 135.Qfe8++-[Exchanging queens.]

Position: b8 black queen, e8 white queen, f8 white king, e7 white queen, a4 black king

After 135.Qfe8+

=== Botvinnik vs. Minev, Amsterdam (ol) 1954 ===
Botvinnik vs. Minev, 1954

Position: g8 white queen, e6 black pawn, h5 white king, b4 black king, g3 white pawn, a1 black queen

After 55...a1=Q

Position: g7 white pawn, c5 white king, d5 white queen, a4 black king, h2 black queen

After 91.Kc5

Ten years later, analyzing his adjourned game against Nikolay Minev, Botvinnik improved the winning method. But even then he erred two times (at moves 61 and 77). The position after 55...a1=Q is a theoretical draw. The game continued:

56.Qg4+ Ka5 57.Qxe6 Qh8+ 58.Kg6 Qc3 59.g4 Qd2 60.g5 Qd4? [60...Ka4=] 61.Qf5+? [61.Kh7!+-] 61...Ka4= 62.Kh5 Qh8+ 63.Kg4 Qh1? [63...Ka3=] 64.Qf4++- Ka5 65.Qe5+ Ka4 66.g6 Qd1+ 67.Kg5 Qd8+ 68.Kf5 Qc8+ 69.Kf4 Qc1+ 70.Qe3 Qc7+ 71.Qe5 Qc1+ 72.Kf5 Qc8+ 73.Kg5 Qd8+ 74.Qf6 Qd5+ 75.Qf5! Qd8+ 76.Kh5 Qe8 77.Qf4+? [77.Kg4+-] 77...Ka5? [77...Ka3!=] 78.Qd2++- Ka4 79.Qd4+ Ka5 80.Kg5 Qe7+ 81.Kf5 Qf8+ 82.Ke4 Qh6 83.Qe5+ Ka4 84.g7 Qh1+ 85.Kd4 Qd1+ 86.Kc5 Qc1+ 87.Kd6 Qd2+ 88.Ke6 Qa2+ 89.Qd5 Qe2+ 90.Kd6 Qh2+ 91.Kc5 1–0

Now either a cross-check will force the exchange of queens, or else the pawn will promote.

== Queen and two pawns versus a queen ==
This is usually a win for the two pawns, but victory can be difficult to achieve even in winning positions, as even the slightest inaccuracy may lead to perpetual check. Positions in which one of the pawns is vulnerable to attack may be drawn, but they are unusual.

There are a number of other drawing exceptions, most notably with connected rook and knight pawns (a- & b-pawns, or g- & h-pawns) in which the defending king is ahead of the pawns.

Lputian vs. Haroutjunian, 2001

Position: g8 black king, e6 black queen, h6 white pawn, g5 white pawn, d4 white queen, g2 white king

This position, after 86.h6, is a draw.

Position: h8 black king, c7 black queen, f7 black circle, f6 white circle, h6 white pawn, g5 white pawn, f4 white queen, g3 white king

In this drawn position after White's 141.Qf4 (which intercepts check and counterthreatens the Black queen), Black blundered with ...Qf7, hoping for 142.Qxf7 stalemate. White instead played Qf6+, forcing an exchange of queens leading to a winning king and pawn endgame, and Black resigned.

An example is Smbat Lputian vs. Gevorg Harutjunyan, 2001. The position after 86.h6 (the last pawn move of the game) is a draw. Play continued until move 142, with inaccuracies on both sides swinging the position from a draw to a forced win, and back again. Interestingly, Black could have claimed a draw by the fifty-move rule for the last several moves, including the final position in which he resigned, but he did not.

== Queen and two pawns versus a queen and pawn ==
Lomonosov tablebases

Position: f7 black pawn, g7 black king, h7 black queen, a5 white pawn, b4 white king, g4 white queen, a2 white pawn

White mates in 297.
Kasparov vs. the World

Position: d6 black pawn, f6 white king, b5 black pawn, g5 white pawn, f4 white queen, a1 black king, d1 black queen

Position after 54.Qf4.

Normally this is a win for the two pawns, but a surprising result of seven-piece Lomonosov tablebases is that the longest possible win requires 594 plies. In Kasparov versus the World, however, Kasparov was the side with a single pawn, but won because his pawn was far more advanced than the world team's pawns, which also hindered perpetual checks by them.

== See also ==
- Chess endgame
- Endgame tablebase
- Queen versus pawn endgame
