= Philippe Ambroise Durand =

French abbé and chess writer

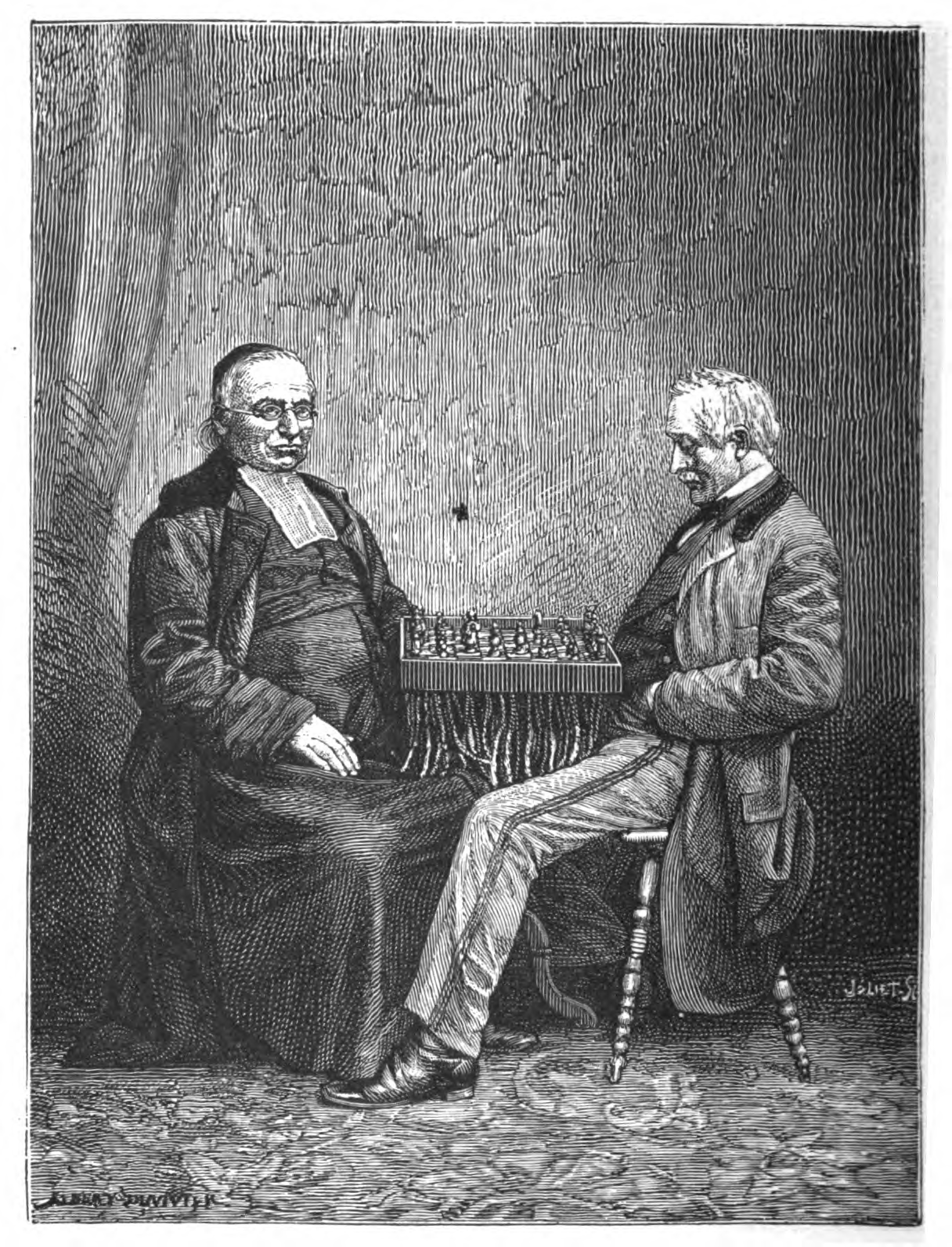
Durand and Jean-Louis Preti

Philippe Ambroise Durand (1799 – 11 February 1880) was a French abbé and chess writer.

Born in Fresné-la-Mère, Calvados, he was professor of rhetoric at Falaise and later taught philosophy at Lisieux before retiring in 1860. Durand collaborated with Jean-Louis Preti to write three books on chess, including the two-volume Stratégie raisonnée des fins de partie (1871–73). These were the first books devoted to the practical endgame, and included concepts such as conjugate squares and the opposition. He is also said to have coined the chess term trébuchet. Durand died in Lisieux in 1880.

== Publications ==
- Durand, L'Abbé; Metton, Louis; Preti, Jean (1862), Stratégie raisonnée des ouvertures de jeu d'échecs (in French), Paris
- Durand, L'Abbé; Preti, Jean (1871–1873), Stratégie raisonnée des fins de partie du jeu d'échecs (in French), vol. Premier Fascicule et Livre II, Paris

== See also ==
- Chess endgame literature
