= Jean-Louis Preti =

French chess player

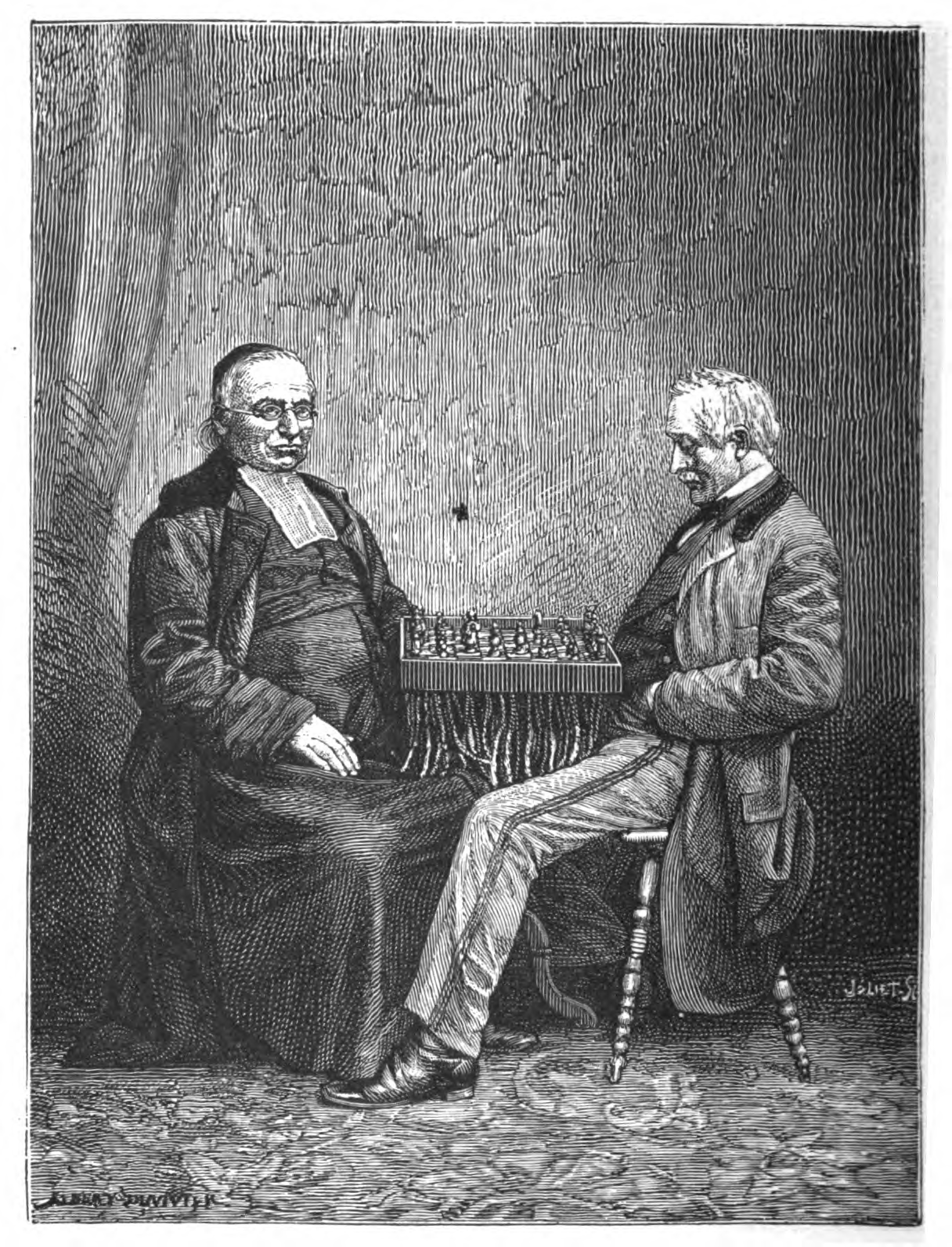
Philippe Ambroise Durand playing chess with Jean-Louis Preti

Jean-Louis Preti (1798 – 27 January 1881) was a musician and chess writer, specializing in the chess endgame.

Born in Mantua, Italy, Preti studied music and became a flutist. Involvement in a political conspiracy against Austria caused him to flee Italy in 1826. Settling in Bordeaux, France, he was appointed first flutist at the city theater and developed an interest in chess. After eighteen years in Bordeaux he moved to Paris and ran an export business.

In Paris in 1867 Preti founded the famous monthly chess magazine La Stratégie, which he edited until 1875. His son Numa Preti (27 February 1841, Bordeaux – 28 January 1908, Argentuil) succeeded him as editor from 1875 to 1907. Henri Delaire (16 August 1860, Paris – 27 October 1941) edited the magazine from 1907 until it stopped publishing in 1940.

Preti's primary work in the endgame was Traité complet, théorique et pratique sur les fins de parties au jeu des échecs (Paris 1858). He also coauthored three books with Philippe Ambroise Durand, including the two-volume Stratégie raisonné des fins de partie (1871–1873). These were the first books devoted to the practical endgame, and included concepts such as conjugate squares and the opposition.

== Publications ==
- Preti, Jean (1856), Recueil d'études progressives sur les fins de parties au jeu des échecs (In French), Paris
- Preti, Jean (1858), Traité complet, théorique et pratique sur les fins de parties au jeu des échecs (in French), Paris
- Preti, Jean (1859), Choix des parties les plus remarquables jouées par Paul Morphy en Amérique, en Angleterre et en France (in French), Paris
- Durand, L'Abbé; Metton, Louis; Preti, Jean (1862–1863), Stratégie raisonnée des ouvertures de jeu d'échecs (in French), vol. Premier Fascicule et Livre II, Paris
- Preti, Jean (1868), ABC des échecs (in French), Paris
- Durand, L'Abbé; Preti, Jean (1871–1873), Stratégie raisonnée des fins de partie du jeu d'échecs (in French), vol. Premier Fascicule et Livre II, Paris

== See also ==
- Chess endgame literature
