= Lionel Joyner =

Canadian chess player (1932–2001)

Personal information
- Born: March 28, 1932 Montreal, Quebec
- Died: June 28, 2001 (aged 69) Port Coquitlam, British Columbia

Chess career
- Country: Canada

Lionel Berry Joyner (1932-2001) was a Canadian chess master. He won the 1961 Canadian Chess Championship and was a Canadian Open Chess Championship medalist (1964). He also represented Canada at the 1951 World Junior Chess Championship and at the 1958 Chess Olympiad.

== Chess career ==
From the late 1950s to the mid-1960s, Lionel Joyner was one of Canada's leading chess players. In 1951, he represented Canada at the first World Junior Chess Championship. He also lived briefly in California, where he won the Los Angeles County Championship in 1952. In 1956, he became chess champion of Montreal, having won all 17 games in the tournament. In 1958, Joyner played the first reserve board on the Canadian team at the 13th Chess Olympiad in Munich, scoring +4, =6, -3.

Joyner was first in 1961, +8 =2 -1, and second in 1965, +8 =2 -1, at the Canadian Chess Championship. He also won the bronze medal at the Canadian Open Chess Championship in 1964.

In 1985, he shared first place at the Paul Keres Memorial Tournament in Vancouver.

Joyner also played correspondence chess and won the US Chess Federation's Golden Knights Championship (1961–62).

After leaving Montreal, he lived in Edmonton and later in Port Coquitlam, British Columbia.

An accountant by profession, he worked at the Vancouver Stock Exchange and was an active member of the Port Coquitlam Chess Club in his later years.
