= Georgi Orlov (chess player) =

American chess player (born 1964)

Personal information
- Born: November 1964 (age 61–62)
- Spouse: Elena Donaldson-Akhmilovskaya (m. 1995; died 2012)

Chess career
- Country: Soviet Union (until 1991); Russia (1991–1995); United States (since 1995)
- Title: International Master (1990)
- FIDE rating: 2419 (November 2026)
- Peak rating: 2530 (July 2004)

Georgi Orlov is an American chess player and writer.

== Chess career ==
He won the Moldovan Chess Championship in 1986 and 1989.

In 1992, he published a book on the Black Knights' Tango.

In 1994, he won the U.S. Open Chess Championship.

He is a 15-time winner of the Paul Keres Memorial Tournament, first winning in 1996 and most recently in 2023. In 2003, he won with a perfect score.

In 1999, he won the Canadian Open Chess Championship with a score of 9.5/11, beating Kevin Spraggett on tiebreaks.

== Personal life ==
He was married to Elena Donaldson-Akhmilovskaya from 1995 until her death in 2012.
