= Ilya Maizelis =

Russian historian and chess player

Ilya Lvovich Maizelis (Russian: Илья Львович Майзелис; 28 December, 1894 in Uman, Cherkasy Oblast, today in Ukraine – 23 December, 1978 in Moscow) was a Soviet chess player, writer, and theoretician.

Maizelis was better known as a writer than as a player. He played in several Moscow city championships during the 1920s and 1930s, his best result being 4th place in 1932. Under the Soviet system he was ranked as a "first category" player, the next rank below Master. In modern terms, this is equivalent to an Elo rating in the 2200s.

He was on the editorial board of 64 from 1925 to 1930, and was executive secretary of the English-language Soviet Chess Chronicle from 1943 to 1946. He was the author of a number of instructional works on chess, including Shakhmat (1949, English version: "Soviet Chess Primer"), and theoretical works on the endgame. Pawn Endings was published by Batsford in English in 1974. He also translated a number of German language chess books into Russian, including Aron Nimzowitsch's My System and Emanuel Lasker's Manual of Chess.
