= Jason Cao =

Canadian chess player (born 2000)

Personal information
- Born: December 17, 2000 (age 25) Victoria, British Columbia

Chess career
- Country: Canada
- Title: FIDE Master (2010)
- Peak rating: 2368 (August 2015)

Jason Cao (born December 17, 2000) is a Canadian chess player.

== Chess career ==
Cao began playing chess at age 8.

In 2010, Cao won the U10 World Youth Chess Championship ahead of Jeffery Xiong, Abhimanyu Puranik, and Bhaskar Gupta. He is a three-time British Columbia chess champion.

In 2015, Cao won the Paul Keres Memorial Tournament in Vancouver.

In 2016, Cao competed in the Grand Pacific Open chess tournament held in Victoria.

In August 2018, Cao won the Cowichan Rapid Open Chess Championship, defeating NM Roger Patterson on tiebreaks.

== Personal life ==
From 2018 to 2023, Cao attended the University of British Columbia for a bachelor of applied science in computer engineering.
