= Cross-check (chess) =

Type of move in chess

In chess, a cross-check (or counter-check) is a tactic in which a check is played in response to a check, especially when the original check is blocked by a piece that itself either delivers check or reveals a discovered check from another piece. Sometimes the term is extended to cover cases in which the king moves out of check and reveals a discovered check from another piece (this is also known as a royal check); it does not generally apply to cases where the original checking piece is captured.

The cross-check is an essential tactic in winning some endgames such as those with two queens versus one, or a queen and pawn versus a queen. In these cases, the defense usually tries for a perpetual check and sometimes the stronger side can stop it only by a cross-check.

== Examples ==
A cross-check occurs from time to time in games. It is an essential tactic in winning endgames such as two queens versus one queen, or queen and pawn versus queen, where it is used to stop a series of checks from the opponent and force the exchange of queens. It is also used in some chess problems.

=== Botvinnik vs. Minev game ===
Botvinnik vs. Minev, 1954

Position: c7 black circle, g7 white pawn, c6 white circle, c5 white king, d5 white queen, a4 black king, c4 white circle, d4 white circle, c2 black circle, f2 black circle, h2 black queen, g1 black circle

Black, to move, resigned. Black dots are where the black queen can check; white dots are where the white queen can cross-check in reply.

Cross-checks are rare in actual play, though they do occur, and in some endgames, particularly queen endgames, they are very important. The position shown to the right is the final position in the famous queen endgame from the game between Mikhail Botvinnik and Nikolay Minev, Amsterdam Olympiad, 1954. In the position shown, after 91. Kc5!!, Black resigned because the promising looking checks 91...Qc7+, 91...Qg1+, 91...Qf2+ and 91...Qc2+ are answered by the cross-checks 92.Qc6+, 92.Qd4+, 92.Qd4+ and 92.Qc4+ respectively, forcing an exchange of queens in all cases, which will result in the promotion of the pawn and winning the game by a basic checkmate. This is an important theme in queen endgames: the weaker side often gives a series of checks, and it is frequently important for them to avoid simplifying cross-checks such as these in reply (Burgess 2000:102–3, 458–59), (Golombek 1977). If the black queen attacks the pawn instead of checking it does no good since the promotion square of the pawn is protected by its queen. Note too that if Black instead merely allows the pawn's promotion, another cross-check may be necessary to win, as in the next section.

=== Two queens versus one ===
Botvinnik vs. Ravinsky, 1944

Position: c8 black queen, g7 white pawn, g6 white king, a4 black king, f4 white queen

Black resigned after 126.Qf4+.
Possible continuation

Position: b8 black queen, e8 white circle, f8 white king, e7 white queen, f7 white queen, a4 black king

Cross-check with 135.Qee8+ wins.

In the position on the left from Botvinnik–Ravinsky, Black resigned. With best play according to the endgame tablebase, 126...Kb3 127.Qf7+ Ka4 128.g8=Q Qg4+ 129.Kh6 Qh4+ 130.Kg7 Qg3+ 131.Kf8 Qd6+ 132.Qe7 Qh6+ 133.Qgg7 Qf4+ 134.Qgf7 Qb8+ and the position on the right is reached. Then the cross-check 135.Qee8+ (or Qfe8+) forks the king and queen, forces an exchange, and wins the game.

=== Anderson problem, 1919 ===
G.F. Anderson, 1919

Position: c7 white king, e7 white queen, f7 black pawn, h7 black bishop, c6 black pawn, b5 black king, a3 white rook, b3 white bishop, c3 black pawn, g3 black rook, b1 white rook

Cross-checks are relatively infrequent in actual play, but are popular in chess problems since they make for a relatively unobvious solution. In the problem shown to the right, White is to move and mate in two moves against any defence. It is by G.F. Anderson and was first published in Il Secolo in 1919. The key 1.Kd6, threatening 2.Qb7#, gives the black king two flight squares, and two of the variations exploit these: 1...Kb6 2.Bc2# and 1...Kb4 2.Kxc6#. The other two defences exploit the fact that the key exposes the white king to checks, and are answered by cross-checks: 1...Rg6+ 2.Be6# and 1...Rd3+ 2.Bd5#.

=== Anderson problem, 1961 ===
G. F. Anderson, The Observer, 1961

Position: d8 white queen, f8 black bishop, h8 black knight, a7 black rook, e7 black pawn, h7 white king, a6 black pawn, c6 white pawn, d6 white pawn, e6 white pawn, f6 white pawn, h6 black pawn, a5 white rook, c5 white knight, e5 black king, f5 black knight, h5 black rook, c4 white bishop, f4 white rook, g4 white pawn, e3 black pawn, g3 white bishop, h3 white knight, f2 black pawn, h2 black queen, b1 black bishop

The problem to the right, also by G. F. Anderson (first published in The Observer in 1961) and also a mate in two, features no fewer than five cross-checks. The key is 1.Qb6 (threat: 2.Ne4#), with the following variations:

1...exf6+ 2.Nb7#
1...exd6+ 2.Nd7#
1...Nd4+ 2.Rf5#
1...Nxd6+ 2.Nd3#
1...Nf-other+ 2.Ne4#
1...Kxf6 2.Qb2#
1...Kxd6 2.Rd4#

== See also ==
- Pawnless chess endgame
