= Georgy Timoshenko =

Ukrainian chess grandmaster (born 1966)

Personal information
- Born: June 1, 1966 (age 60) Kyiv, Ukrainian SSR, Soviet Union

Chess career
- Country: Ukraine
- Title: Grandmaster (1994)
- FIDE rating: 2472 (July 2026)
- Peak rating: 2595 (July 1998)

Georgy Timoshenko (born 1 June 1966) is a Ukrainian chess grandmaster. He became an International Master in 1989 and a Grandmaster in 1994. He won the Moscow City Chess Championship in 1988, and the Paul Keres Memorial Tournament in 2007.

As of 2025, he has been inactive since mid-2015.
