= La Stratégie =

Chess Magazine

La Stratégie: Journal d'Échecs was a French monthly chess magazine published from 1867 to 1940. One of the more famous chess serials, it was established in Paris by Jean-Louis Preti. La Stratégie had only three editors during its entire run: Preti 1867–1875, his son Numa Preti 1875–1907, and Henri Delaire 1907–1940.
