= Jüri Vetemaa =

Estonian chess player

Jüri Vetemaa (26 August 1956 – 16 July 2003) was an Estonian chess player and chess journalist.

He was born in Tallinn. In 1979 he graduated from Tallinn State Conservatory in piano speciality.

His chess career in 1972 when he won Kaarel Hermlin's memorial tournament in Jõgeva. He has won medals at Estonian Chess Championships. In 1989, 1994 and 1995 he won Paul Keres Memorial Tournament. Since 1992 competed for Belgium. In 1997 he won Belgian Chess Championships.

1983–1984 he edited the chess section at the newspaper Noorte Hääl.
