= Basic Chess Endings =

1941 book by Reuben Fine

- The 2003 edition of Basic Chess Endings
- Author: Reuben Fine
- Language: English
- Publisher: McKay
- Publication date: 1941, 2003
- Publication place: United States
- Media type: Print
- Pages: 587
- ISBN: 978-0-8129-3493-9
- OCLC: 53482237
- Dewey Decimal: 794.1/24 22
- LC Class: GV1451 .F5 2003

Basic Chess Endings (abbreviated BCE) is a book on chess endgames which was written by Grandmaster Reuben Fine and originally published on October 27, 1941. It is considered the first systematic book in English on the endgame phase of the game of chess. It is the best-known endgame book in English and is a classic piece of chess endgame literature. The book is dedicated to World Champion Emanuel Lasker, who died in 1941 (the year the book was published). It was revised in 2003 by Pal Benko.

Cecil Purdy said "... Basic Chess Endings is a monumental work, one of the most complete and authoritative on endgames in any language".

== History ==
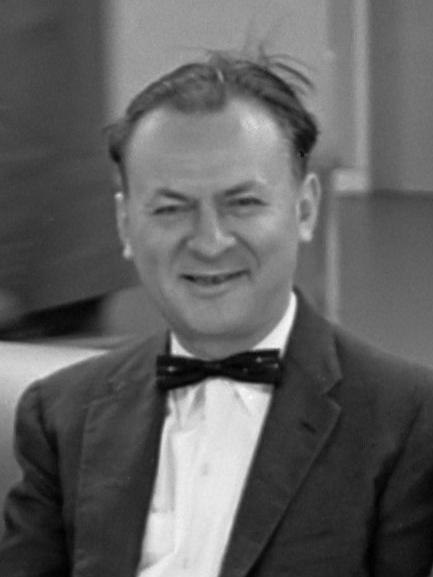
Author Reuben Fine

Basic Chess Endings was written by Reuben Fine in only four months and was published in 1941 by McKay (a division of Random House) in hardback. The book used the now obsolete descriptive chess notation and used the old system of using the abbreviation "Kt" to stand for knight instead of the more modern "N". In 1944 Chess Review received many letters debating the change from Kt to N.

In a 1984 interview, Fine said that it took him three months to write the book. He said that organizing the material gave him no trouble, but it was hard work coming up with example positions. He created many of the examples. There was a Hardback Limited Edition of 500 signed By Reuben Fine sold by USCF in the 1940s. The hardback edition was reprinted at least as late as 1960. The copyright was renewed in 1969 as the book went through many paperback impressions. The cover of the 1971 paperback printing is shown at the right. It went through ten printings in paperback by 1981.

BCE has appeared hardbound and softbound with several covers. This one is from 1971.

Over the years, many errors were found, and many of them were published in Chess Life in the column by Larry Evans. Over one hundred such errors were found and a mimeographed list of them was printed and circulated by Paul L. Crane and Rev. David Chew. An 18-page booklet containing over 200 corrections was published by Samuel Louie in 1990 and 1993. Despite these errors, the book remained in print in its original form. After many years, editor Burt Hochberg finally convinced the publisher to create a new edition. Endgame expert Pal Benko, whose own copy of the book contained hand-written notes of almost all of the errors, did the revision. The revised edition was published in 2003, but only in paperback. Benko converted it to the now universally-accepted algebraic chess notation. He also added some new material based on more recent analysis and added many new examples. He made many corrections, but a few errors remain. For example, Benko repeats Fine's claim that the endgame of two bishops and a knight against a rook is drawn with correct play. In fact, endgame tablebases show that the three minor pieces win. Howard Staunton, without the aid of computer analysis, had recognized this over 150 years earlier. Bernhard Horwitz and Josef Kling gave the same appraisal in 1851.

The original book contains 573 pages and 607 diagrams of positions. Many other positions were given by listing the location of the pieces rather than showing a diagram. The 2003 revision contains 587 pages with 1330 positions, most with diagrams.

== Impact ==
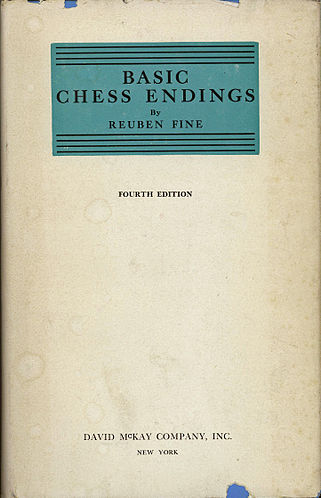
Dust jacket of the 1958 printing

Larry Evans listed it in his "basic chess library" and said that it was "distinguished by lucidity and keen organization". Copies of the book are owned by many generations of chess players around the world. World Champion Mikhail Botvinnik considered it the best book on the endgame. Yuri Averbakh (who wrote the five-volume Comprehensive Chess Endings and Chess Endings: Essential Knowledge) based his research on this book.

Many other books have listed BCE as a reference, including Mastering the Endgame, Practical Endgame Play, and Starting Out: Pawn Endings by Glenn Flear; Fundamental Chess Endings and Secrets of Pawn Endings by Karsten Müller and Frank Lamprecht; How to Play Chess Endgames by Karsten Müller and Wolfgang Pajeken; Winning Chess Endings by Yasser Seirawan; Silman's Complete Endgame Course by Jeremy Silman; 101 Chess Endgame Tips by Stephen Giddins; Rook Endings by Grigory Levenfish and Vasily Smyslov; Tactical Chess Endings by John Nunn, On the Endgame by Cecil Purdy; and Essential Chess Endings by James Howell.

== Chapters ==
1. The Elementary Mates
2. King and Pawn Endings
3. Knight and Pawn Endings
4. Bishop and Pawn Endings
5. Minor Piece Endings
6. Rook and Pawn Endings
7. Rook and Minor Pieces
8. Queen Endings
9. Conclusion and Summary
10. Twenty Rules for the Endgame

Except for the last two chapters, all of the other chapters have sub-chapters based on pawn distribution or positional factors. Many of those sub-chapters have sections and subsections.

== Review by John Nunn ==
Grandmaster John Nunn wrote a review of Basic Chess Endings, both the original version and the revised edition. A paraphrasing of his review follows.

"This is a classic book... The quality of the general explanations is excellent and probably has never been surpassed. ... Fine is at his best when he gives general descriptions and the book has been rightly praised for its instructional value. ... However, there are many errors in the concrete analysis of positions. ... The quality of the general explanations compensates for the errors and makes it well worth reading. ... The only exception is the chapter on queen endings, which has advanced greatly since 1941, and much of the material is seriously misleading."

On Benko's revision, "A chance to bring this classic up to date was squandered. ... The layout has been improved, but still many positions are without diagrams and some positions have been removed. ... There is a small amount of new material, but it is mostly from Benko's games and studies, and some of the new material has been added clumsily. ... The chapter on queen endings has not been changed to reflect the discoveries since 1941. ... The greatest disappointment is the failure to correct many of the errors in the original book, some of which are well-known. ... No systematic computer-checking of the analysis was done. ... Some (out of around 900 mistakes) errors have been corrected but many remain. ... Despite this, the book is recommended for Fine's groundbreaking general explanations, but it is not completely accurate or up-to-date".

== See also ==
- Chess endgame
- Chess endgame literature
