= Edward Freeborough =

Personal information
- Born: Edward Freeborough; 18 August 1830 Hull, England
- Died: 14 September 1896 (aged 66) Hull, England

Chess career
- Country: England

Edward Freeborough (18 August 1830 – 14 September 1896) was the co-author, with Charles Ranken, of Chess Openings Ancient and Modern (1889), one of the first important opening treatises in the English language and a precursor of Modern Chess Openings. He was a member of the editorial staff of the British Chess Magazine from 1883 until his death in 1896. He also wrote the books Chess Endings (1891, 1896) and Select Chess End-Games from Actual Play (1895, 1899), and edited the book Analysis of the Chess Ending, King and Queen Against King and Rook by "Euclid" (a pseudonym for A. Crosskill) (1895).

Freeborough had just completed the third edition of Chess Openings Ancient and Modern and transmitted the final version to the publisher "when he was struck down by a sudden and mortal illness".

== Legacy book ==
Chess Openings Ancient and Modern, first (1889) and third (1896) editions

The first edition of the book was published in 1889. Later editions were published in 1893, 1896, and 1910. It was one of the first opening books written in columnar form: columns of move-sequences thought to constitute best play, presented in chess notation and concluding with a symbol indicating the analyst's assessment of the final position (such as "equal", "White wins", or "advantage to Black"). The book also set forth a number of general principles, many of which are still valid today.

Even 20th-century grandmasters studied the book. Frank Brady wrote in his biography of World Champion Bobby Fischer that Chess Openings Ancient and Modern was one of the most heavily annotated books in Fischer's personal library. Fischer had pencilled in his own analyses of the Scotch Game, Giuoco Piano, Evans Gambit, Bishop's Gambit, Danish Gambit, and other openings. Referring specifically to the analysis in Chess Openings Ancient and Modern, Grandmaster Robert Byrne wrote in a 1991 chess column in The New York Times, "Ingenious strategies and tactics were tried out in the old days, and if your opponent knows them and you don't, you are in for a pounding." Likewise Fischer, in his famous book My 60 Memorable Games, annotating an Evans Gambit that he had won against Reuben Fine, cited analysis from the 1893 edition of Chess Openings Ancient and Modern as an improvement on Fine's ninth move.

== A rare game ==
Freeborough was not distinguished as a player, and few of his games survive. Amos Burn, one of the world's strongest players, easily beat him in the following game.

Burn–Freeborough, Lancashire vs. Yorkshire match, 1887:
1. e4 e5 2. Nc3 Bc5 3. f4 Bxg1? 4. Rxg1 Nc6? 5. fxe5 Nxe5 6. d4 Ng6 7. Qf3 c6? 8. Bc4 Qf6 9. Qxf6 Nxf6 10. e5 Nh5?? Losing a piece. 11. g3 Ne7 12. g4 b5 13. Bd3 Bb7 14. gxh5 Kf8 15. Ne4 Nc8? Losing another piece. 16. Nc5 Rb8? 17. Nxd7+ 1–0 Burn commented, "Mr. Freeborough is so constant a writer on the theory of the game that this example of his practice is somewhat remarkable."
