= Jeremy Silman =

American chess player and writer (1954–2023)

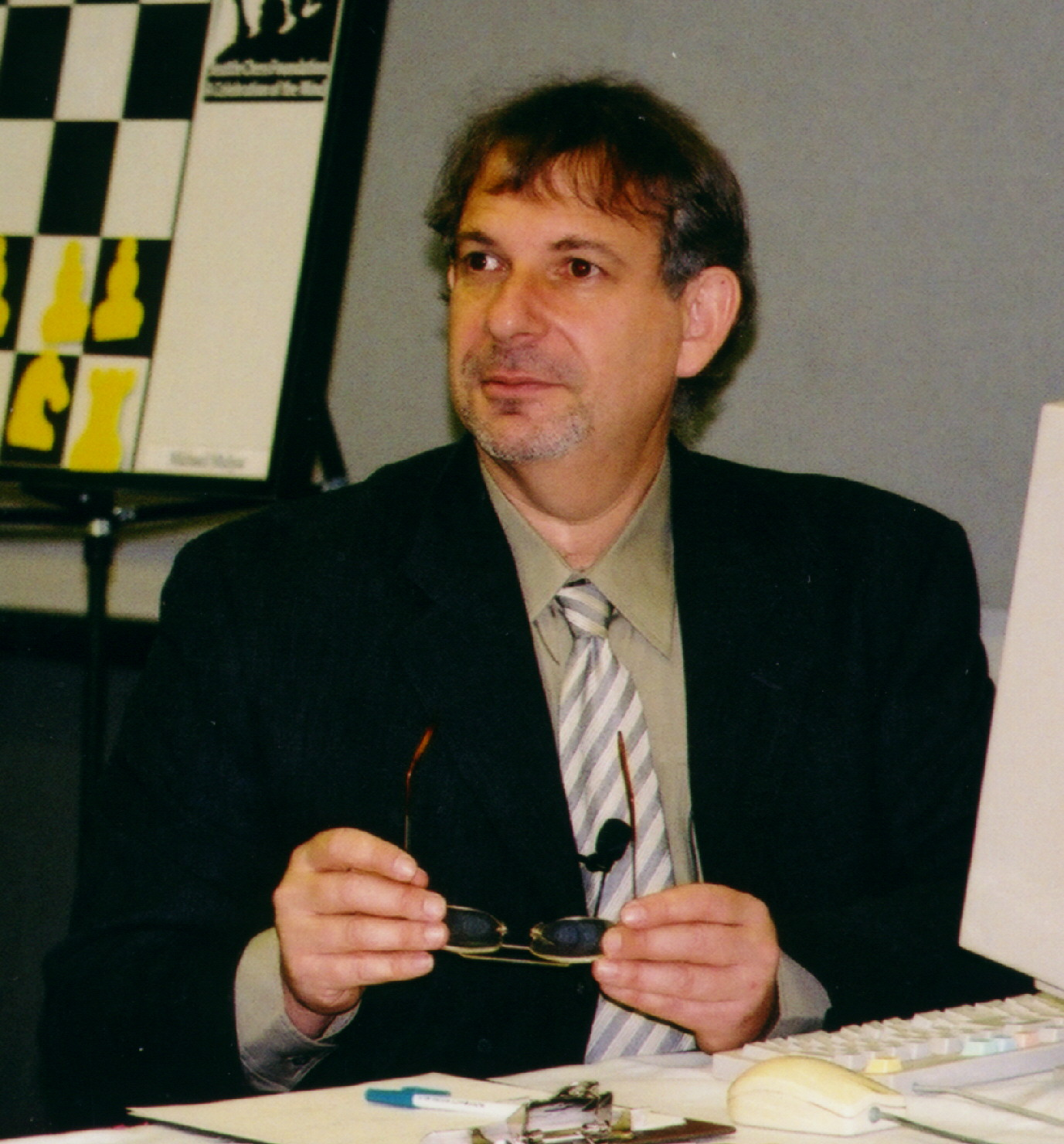
- Silman in 2002

Personal information
- Born: August 28, 1954 Del Rio, Texas, U.S.
- Died: September 21, 2023 (aged 69) West Hollywood, California, U.S.

Chess career
- Country: United States
- Title: International Master (1988)
- Peak rating: 2420 (January 1995)

Jeremy Silman (August 28, 1954 – September 21, 2023) was an American chess player and writer. He obtained the title of International Master (IM).

== Early life ==
Silman was born in Del Rio, Texas, on August 28, 1954. His father was in the military and the family moved frequently before settling in San Diego by the early 1960s. Silman began playing chess at the age of 12. In high school, he wanted to move to the Soviet Union and study chess, due to the game's popularity and the number of skilled players he knew there. This was infeasible, so he instead served briefly in the U.S. Army before moving in San Francisco to continue playing chess. His family was not understanding of his passion for chess, and he grew apart from them over the years.

In San Francisco, Silman was involved in the Haight-Ashbury scene in the 1970s. The preface to his Endgame Course mentions this, and fellow chess players Daniel King and Ronan Bennett allude to this in a newspaper column from 2007. His years in San Francisco inspired Autobiography of a Goat (2013), a semi-autobiographical novel. He lived in London, Chicago, and Seattle for brief stretches before moving to Los Angeles, where he was based for the rest of his life.

== Chess ==
Silman won the American Open, the National Open, and the U.S. Open, and was the coach of the US junior national chess team. He attained the IM title in 1988. He wrote over 35 books, mostly on chess but also on casino gambling, as well as articles for chess magazines such as Chess Life and New in Chess. He also wrote many articles and puzzles for the Chess.com.

Silman was the professor in a video chess course produced by The Teaching Company as part of its Great Courses series.

Silman served as a chess consultant on the 2001 Harry Potter film Harry Potter and the Philosopher's Stone, Monk, and Malcolm in the Middle. However, Silman was uncredited for his work on Harry Potter and the Philosopher's Stone.

=== Strategy of imbalances ===
In his books, Silman evaluates positions according to the "imbalances", or differences, which exist in every position, and advocates that players plan their play according to these. A good plan, according to Silman, is one which highlights the positive imbalances in the position. According to Dana Mackenzie, the imbalances are, in roughly descending order of importance:

- Superior minor piece, which refers to the relative strength of the knights and bishops
- Pawn structure
- Spatial control
- Material; in his Chess Life series The Art of Planning, Silman called this the most important imbalance because it affected every phase of the game;
- Control of open files, diagonals, and squares
- Development
- Initiative; Silman notes that this (along with superior development) is a dynamic imbalance that must be used quickly if the advantage is not to fade away

=== Silman's thinking technique ===
Silman proposes in How to Reassess Your Chess a five-fold procedure that he recommends that players use. This procedure is to be followed after checking for tactical threats for both sides.

1. Figure out the positive and negative imbalances for both sides.
2. Figure out the side of the board you wish to play on. You can only play when a favourable imbalance or the possibility of creating a favourable imbalance exists.
3. Don't calculate! Instead, dream up various fantasy positions, i.e., the positions you would most like to achieve.
4. Once you find a fantasy position that makes you happy, you must figure out if you can reach it. If you find that your choice was not possible to implement, you must create another dream position that is easier to achieve.
5. Only now do you look at the moves you wish to calculate (called candidate moves). The candidate moves are all the moves that lead to our dream position.

== Personal life and death ==
Silman was married to Gwen Feldman. He died from primary progressive aphasia, a form of dementia, on September 21, 2023, at his home in West Hollywood, California; he was 69 years old.

== Books ==
- Silman's Chess Odyssey: Cracked Grandmaster Tales, Legendary Players, and Instruction and Musings, 2022, Siles Press, ISBN 978-1890085247.
- Autobiography of a Goat, 2013, 252 pages, Maelstrom Press, ISBN 978-0989928908.
- How to Reassess your Chess (4th edition): Chess Mastery through Chess Imbalances, 2010, 658 pages, Siles Press, ISBN 978-1890085131.
- Silman's Complete Endgame Course: From Beginner To Master, 2007, 530 pages, Siles Press, ISBN 978-1890085100.
- Pal Benko: My Life, Games and Compositions, with Pal Benko and John L. Watson, 2004, 520 pages, Siles Press, ISBN 978-1890085087.
- Gambits in the Slav with William John Donaldson, 2003, 160 pages, Chess Enterprises, ISBN 978-0945470397.
- The Reassess your Chess Workbook: How to Master Chess Imbalances, 2001, 400 pages, Siles Press, ISBN 978-1890085056.
- The Amateur's Mind (2nd edition): Turning Chess Misconceptions into Chess Mastery, 1999, 443 pages, Siles Press, ISBN 978-1890085025.
- Accelerated Dragons (2nd edition) with William John Donaldson, 1998, 320 pages, Everyman Chess, ISBN 978-1857442083.
- The Complete Book of Chess Strategy: Grandmaster Techniques from A to Z, 1998, 360 pages, Siles Press, ISBN 978-1890085018.
- Winning with the Sicilian Defense (2nd edition): A Complete Repertoire against 1.e4, 1998, 353 pages, Chess Digest, ISBN 978-0875681986.
- Essential Chess Endings Explained Move by Move Volume One: Novice thru Intermediate, 1992, 223 pages, Chess Digest, ISBN 978-0875681726.
- The Dynamic Caro-Kann: The Bronstein Larsen and the Original Caro System, 1990, 182 pages, Summit Publishing, ISBN 978-0945806028.
- A Complete Black Repertoire, 1986, 126 pages, Chess Digest, ISBN 978-0875681634.
