= William John Donaldson =

American chess player (born 1958)

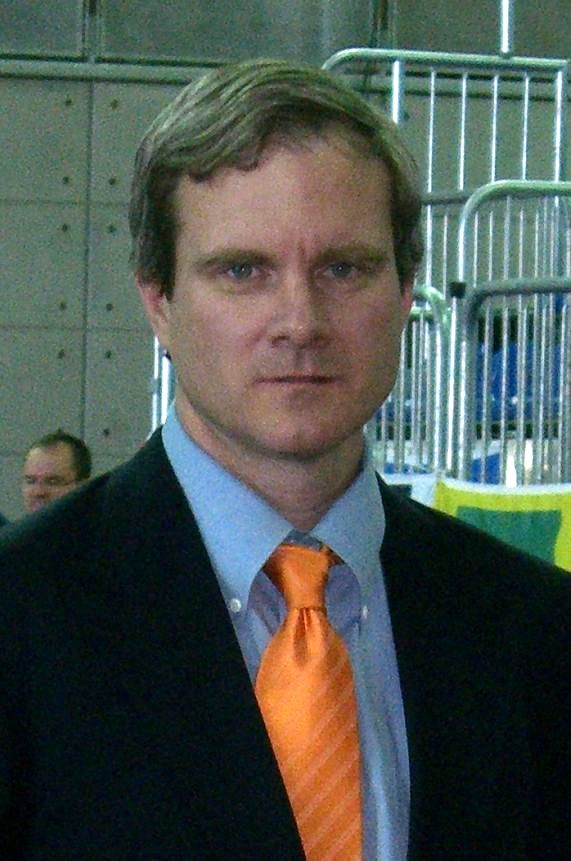
- Donaldson in Turin, 2006

Personal information
- Born: September 24, 1958 (age 67) Los Angeles, California, U.S.
- Spouse: Elena Akhmilovskaya (m. 1988; div. 1989)

Chess career
- Country: United States
- Title: International Master (1983)
- FIDE rating: 2416 (September 2026)
- Peak rating: 2460 (January 2004)

William John Donaldson (born September 24, 1958), known as John Donaldson, is an American chess player, author, journalist and chess official. Like many of his contemporaries, he began playing in the aftermath of the World Chess Championship 1972 between Fischer and Spassky. He joined the Tacoma Chess Club in September 1972, and is still involved with the game almost 50 years later.

FIDE awarded Donaldson the title of International Master (IM) in 1983. He has two grandmaster (GM) norms and missed a third, at the 2000 Paul Keres Memorial in Vancouver, by half a point. Among the international tournaments in which Donaldson has finished first or tied for first are Hamar (Norway) 1986; Philadelphia 1987; Bermuda 1995, 1996, and 1997 (=1st with GM Sergey Kudrin; Lindsborg (Kansas) 2002 (=1st with GM Alexander Onischuk; and Calgary 2007. He also won the 2001 Lindsborg Rotary Open, a three-day event, ahead of three GMs and three IMs.

Donaldson has captained the U.S. national team on 25 occasions, including six Chess Olympiads from 1986 to 1996. He has written almost 40 books on different aspects of the game. His book Bobby Fischer and His World was selected as the 2020 Chess Book Collectors Most Popular Book of the Year.

In 1990, Donaldson was elected to the Policy Board of the United States Chess Federation. He also became an editor of the magazine Inside Chess, published by Yasser Seirawan. After the magazine folded, he moved to San Francisco, where he became chess director of the San Francisco Mechanics Institute. He qualified to play in the 2002 and the 2003 U.S. Chess Championship. He has achieved two norms for the title of grandmaster, at Lindsborg 2002 and at Stratton Mountain 2003.

On December 9, 2006, Donaldson was named US zone president in FIDE, replacing Robert Tanner, who resigned on December 4, 2006.

== Playing ==
The United States Chess Federation awarded Donaldson the title of National Master in 1977, and Senior Master in 1979. FIDE awarded him the title of International Master in 1983. He was Washington State Champion in 1978 and 1979. He received Grandmaster Norms at Lindsborg 2002 and Stratton Mountain 2003. His peak USCF rating was 2601 in the May 1990 United States Chess Federation rating supplement. His peak FIDE rating was 2467 after the Millennium Chess Festival in April 2004.

== Captaining ==
Donaldson is a 15-time captain of the U.S. Chess Olympiad team (1986-1996, 2006-2026 (gold 2016, silver 1990, 2018, 2024, bronze 1986, 1996, 2006, 2008). He is an eight-time captain of the U.S. entry in the World Team Championship (1993, 1997, 2009, 2011, 2013, 2015, 2017 and 2019 (gold 1993, silver 1997 and 2009)). He captained the gold medal U.S. Pan-American Team in 2013. He is a two-time captain of the U.S. Online Olympiad team (bronze 2020, silver 2021). He is the captain of the U.S. entry in the Online Nations Cup (silver 2020). He won the Mikhail Botvinnik Award in 2018.

== Personal ==
Donaldson received a BA in history from the University of Washington. He married Elena Akhmilovskaya, a member of the Soviet women's team, during the 28th Chess Olympiad (Thessaloniki 1988). Later, while the tournament was still going on, the couple traveled to the United States. They divorced about a year later.

== Books ==
- The Life and Games of Frank Anderson. Moravian Chess, 2009. ISBN 978-80-7189-608-1
- The Unknown Bobby Fischer. ISBN 1-879479-85-0
- Alekhine in Europe and Asia. ISBN 1-879479-12-5
- Elmars Zemgalis: Grandmaster without the Title. Pomeranian Press, 2001. ASIN B0006RZ3N6
- Olaf Ulvestad: An American Original. ISBN 1-888710-11-X
- Legend on the Road (about Bobby Fischer's 1964 simul tour). ISBN 1-879479-15-X
- Essential Chess Endings for Advanced Players, Chess Digest, 1995. ISBN 0-87568-263-4
- A Strategic Opening Repertoire. International Chess Enterprises, 1998.
- The Meran Defense. Chess Enterprises, 1987.
- How to Win Quickly at Chess. Summit Publishing, 1991.
- Legend on the Road. International Chess Enterprises, 1994.
- ICON (Inside Chess Opening Novelties: Sicilian Alapin). International Chess Enterprises, 1994.
- ICON (Inside Chess Opening Novelties: Sicilian Accelerated Dragon. International Chess Enterprises, 1995.
- Essential Chess Endings for Advanced Players. Chess Digest, 1995.
- ICON (Inside Chess Opening Novelties: KID Bayonet Attack. International Chess Enterprises, 1996.
- A Strategic Opening Repertoire. International Chess Enterprises, 1998.
- Two Masters from Seattle. ChessBase, 2002.
- Milan Vukcevich: A Gentleman of Chess. 2003.
- Olaf Ulvestad: An American Original. Thinkers Press, 2002.
- Imre Konig. The Chess Player, 2005.
- The Life and Games of Frank Ross Anderson. Moravian Chess, 2009.
- Second US Junior Championship-Cleveland 1947. 2011.
- A Legend on the Road: Bobby Fischer's 1964 Simultaneous Tour (3rd edition revised and enlarged). Kindle, 2015.
- Bobby Fischer and His World. Silman-James Press, 2020.
- A History of the Mechanics' Institute Chess Club: volume 1: The First 100 years (1854-1953). Edited by John Donaldson; researched by Steve Brandwein and John Donaldson. 2002.
- A History of the Mechanics' Institute Chess Room, volume 2: 1954-2002. Edited by John Donaldson; researched by Steve Brandwein and John Donaldson. 2003.
- A Strategic Opening Repertoire (2nd edition, revised and enlarged) (with Carsten Hansen). Russell Enterprises, 2007.
- Akiba Rubinstein: Uncrowned King (with Nikolay Minev). International Chess Enterprises, 1994.
- Akiba Rubinstein: The Later Years. International Chess Enterprises, 1995.
- Dutch Defense: New and Forgotten Ideas. Thinkers' Press, 2003.
- Akiva Rubinstein: The Later Years (2nd edition, revised and enlarged). Russell Enterprises, 2005.
- Akiva Rubinstein: Uncrowned King (2nd edition, revised and enlarged). Russell Enterprises, 2006.
- Alekhine in the Americas (with Nikolay Minev and Yasser Seirawan). International Chess Enterprises, 1992.
- Alekhine in Europe and Asia (with Nikolay Minev and Yasser Seirawan). International Chess Enterprises, 1992.
- Semi-Slav: Non Meran Variations (with Jeremy Silman). Summit Publishing, 1988.
- The Classical Dragon (with Jeremy Silman). Chess Enterprises, 1991.
- Accelerated Dragons (with Jeremy Silman). Cadogan Chess, 1993.
- The Exchange Variation of the Slav (with Jeremy Silman). Chess Enterprises, 1994.
- Gambits in the Slav (with Jeremy Silman). Chess Enterprises, 1993.
- The Slav versus 1.d4 (with Jeremy Silman). Chess Enterprises, 1996.
- Accelerated Dragons (2nd edition, revised and enlarged) (with Jeremy Silman). Everyman Chess, 1998.
- Inside the Mind of Bobby Fischer: Revisiting His Writings and Annotations, Silman-James Press, 2026.
