= Queen versus pawn endgame =

Chess endgame

The chess endgame of a queen versus pawn (with both sides having no other pieces except the kings) is usually an easy win for the side with the queen. However, if the pawn has advanced to its seventh rank it has possibilities of reaching a draw, and there are some drawn positions with the pawn on the sixth rank. This endgame arises most often from a race of pawns to promote.

The side with the queen is the attacker and the side with the pawn the defender. Assume that the attacker has the move. If the pawn is not beyond its sixth rank, the attacker (to move) usually wins easily, but there are a few exceptions. The winning process is to either get the queen on a square in front of the pawn and moving the king over to help win the pawn or to check the defending king until it is forced in front of the pawn and using that tempo to bring the attacking king closer, until it can assist in winning the pawn. After the pawn is won, the attacker has an elementary checkmate.

== Queen versus a pawn on the sixth rank ==
Position: a8 white king, c8 white queen, f3 black pawn, f2 black king

Black to move, White wins

The queen usually wins easily if the pawn is on the sixth rank. In the first position, Black is to move, but White wins.

1... Kg2
2. Qg4+ Kf2
3. Kb7 Ke3

If Black plays 3...Ke2, White replies 4.Qe4+, forcing Black's king back in front of the pawn, and then advances his own king.

4. Kc6 f2
5. Qd1 Kf4
6. Qf1 and White wins.

=== Exceptions ===
Position: b7 white queen, g7 white king, c3 black pawn, c1 black king

White to move, draw (a rare exception because the white king blocks the queen)

Exceptions can occur when the king blocks the queen on a file or diagonal, as in this position.

1. Qh1+ Kb2!

White needs to pin the pawn by 2. Qh8, but the king blocks the pin.

2. Qb7+

This was White's only check which prevents the pawn from advancing, and Black responds

2... Kc1!

repeating the position. If the white king is anywhere else (other than g7 and h8), the queen can pin the pawn and allow for the queen and then the king to approach.

If White tries to approach the king with 3. Kf6! (its best chance)

3... c2
4. Ke5 Kd2
5. Qd5+!

Black has five replies. Four of them lose, but

5... Ke1! draws.
6. Qa5+ Kd1 (6...Ke2 loses to 7.Qa2.)
7. Qa4 Kd2 (7...Kc1 loses to 8.Qa2.)
8. Qa2 Kc3!!

and White can make no progress.

=== Example ===
Horowitz, 1957

Position: g7 white king, h7 white queen, c3 black pawn, a1 black king

If White is to move, 1.Qh6 wins. If Black is to move, 1... Kb2 draws.

The biggest problem for a queen versus a pawn on the sixth rank is when its own king gets in the way. In this position, the white king prevents the queen from getting on the a1 to h8 diagonal, to pin the pawn to prevent it from advancing.

In this position, Black to move draws. White to move actually wins by:

1. Qh6!!

Now if

1... c2

then

2. Qc1+

wins. If Black does not advance the pawn then the white queen can maneuver to pin the pawn along the diagonal, and wins easily.

If instead, White tries what may seem to be correct:

1. Qh1+? (hoping for 1...Ka2, which loses quickly to Qc1.)

1... Kb2! transposes to the main line of the diagram in the "exceptions" section, which is a draw.

=== Example from game ===
Alatortsev vs. Chekhover

Position: a8 white queen, c8 white king, f3 black pawn, f2 black king

Position after 71.a8=Q

In this 1937 game between Vladimir Alatortsev and Vitaly Chekhover, White wins:

71... Ke3
72. Qd5 Kf2

If 72...Ke2 then 73.Qe4+ Kf2 forces the Black king in front of the pawn.

73. Kd7 Kg3
74. Ke6 f2
75. Qh1! 1–0

== Queen versus a pawn on the seventh rank ==
Position: g8 white queen, h5 white king, d3 black king, c2 black pawn

White wins by 1.Qg5!, followed by 2.Qc1.

In order for the defending side to have a chance at a draw (with the other side to move), the pawn must be on its seventh rank and the king must be nearby (plus a few drawing positions with the pawn on the sixth rank, as above). Except for unusual cases, the attacking side wins if the pawn is a knight pawn (b- or g-files) or a central pawn (d- or e-files). For bishop pawns and rook pawns, the result also depends on the location of the attacking king. If the attacking king is close enough to the pawn, it wins; otherwise a draw results.

First note that the attacker may win easily, depending on the location of the kings. In this position, White wins by 1. Qg5! followed by 2. Qc1, and then the white king is brought nearer to win the pawn. If the black king is on any other square around the pawn, the position is a draw, see below (position modified slightly).

=== Central pawn or knight pawn ===
Position: d8 white queen, b7 white king, d2 black king, e2 black pawn

Black to move, White wins. White also wins against a knight pawn.

If the pawn is a central pawn or knight pawn (i.e. on the b, d, e, or g-file), the queen wins easily, except for a few unusual positions. In the position on the right, White wins. It takes several moves, but it is not difficult.

1... Ke3

Black threatens to queen the pawn. White prevents this by forcing the black king in front of the pawn.

2. Qh4 Kd2 3. Qd4+ Kc2 4. Qe3 Kd1 5. Qd3+ Ke1

Without the immediate threat of promotion, White has gained a tempo that can be used to bring his king closer. This process is repeated.

6. Kc6 Kf2 7. Qd2 Kf1 8. Qf4+ Kg1 9. Qe3+ Kf1 10. Qf3+ Ke1

And now White can again bring his king closer.

11. Kd5 Kd2 12. Qf2 Kd1 13. Qd4+ Kc2 14. Qe3 Kd1 15. Qd3+ Ke1 16. Ke4! Kf2 17. Qf3+ Ke1 18. Kd3

and White wins the pawn and then checkmates. The winning process with a knight pawn is the same.

Position: c8 white queen, d7 black circle, d6 black circle, d5 white king, d2 black king, e2 black pawn

White to move. If the White king is on d5 (or the marked squares d6 or d7), the game is drawn as the king interferes with the queen's ability to check.

In some cases, the attacking king can block its own queen, as in the second diagram. If the white king is on d5, d6 or d7, the queen cannot approach the pawn, and the result is a draw.

=== Rook pawn ===
Position: d8 white queen, b7 white king, a2 black pawn, b2 black king

White to move, draw

The process above does not work against a rook pawn. The reason is that when the king was forced in front of his pawn in other locations, he could move out the other side on the next move. With a rook pawn, this file is not available, and there can be a stalemate.

In the first position, if the procedure above is tried,

1. Qd4+ Kb1
2. Qb4+ Kc2
3. Qa3 Kb1
4. Qb3+ Ka1!

and now the position is a stalemate unless White lets the black king back to the b-file. White can make no progress.

Position: d8 white queen, a6 black cross, b6 black cross, c6 black cross, d6 black cross, e6 black cross, d5 white king, e5 black cross, f4 black cross, b3 black circle, f3 black cross, a2 black pawn, b2 black king, c2 black circle, f2 black cross, f1 black cross

White to move, White wins if his king is inside the region marked with "X"s.

White can win similar positions if his king is close enough to the pawn. In the second position, White's king is close enough to win – by allowing the pawn to promote but then checkmating the king. White wins if the king is close enough to move to one of the squares marked with dots in two moves.

1. Qf6+ Kb1 (if 1...Kc2 then 2.Qa1 wins)
2. Qf1+ Kb2
3. Qe2+ Kb1 (3...Kb3 allows 4.Qe5 followed by 5.Qa1)
4. Kc4! a1=Q
5. Kb3

and White checkmates.

If the white king was on e3, the win is simple:

1. Qd2+ Kb1
2. Kd3 a1=Q
3. Qc2#

=== Bishop pawn ===
Position: d8 white queen, a5 black cross, b5 black cross, c5 black cross, d5 black cross, d4 black cross, e4 white king, f4 black cross, b3 black circle, f3 black cross, b2 black king, c2 black pawn, d2 black circle, f2 black cross, f1 black cross

White to move, draw; win if the king is inside the area

A bishop pawn may also draw, but for a different reason (a different stalemate position).

1. Qb6+ Ka1!
2. Qd4+ Kb1
3. Qb4+ Ka1
4. Qc3+ Kb1
5. Qb3+ Ka1!

and White cannot capture the pawn because stalemate would result. The rule is that White wins if their king is close enough to reach b3 or d2 in one move, because it can assist in checkmate.

If the defending king is not on the side of the pawn near the corner and the attacking king is close enough, the game can still be won – often by letting the pawn promote and then checkmating.

Lolli, 1763

Position: g4 white king, g3 white queen, c2 black pawn, d1 black king

White to move, White wins

The second position is a 1763 endgame study by Giambattista Lolli. The black king must be prevented from getting to the other side of his pawn, otherwise he can employ the stalemate defense.

1. Qb3! Kd2
2. Qb2 Kd1
3. Kf3! Kd2 (3...c1=Q 4.Qe2#, or 3...c1=N and White checkmates in three moves: 4.Ke3 Nb3 5.Qc3, and checkmate on the next move.)
4. Kf2 Kd1
5. Qd4+ Kc1
6. Qb4! Black is in zugzwang
6... Kd1
7. Qe1#

Position: g8 white queen, e6 black cross, f6 black cross, g6 black cross, h6 black cross, b5 black cross, c5 black cross, d5 black cross, e5 white king, a4 black cross, a3 black cross, g3 black circle, a2 black cross, d2 black circle, e2 black king, f2 black pawn, a1 black cross

White to move wins since the king is inside the area

The third position shows another win for the attacker, since their king is close and the defending king is not (yet) near the corner.

1. Qc4+ Ke1
2. Qe4+ Kf1
3. Kf4 Kg1 (the black king gets to the corner, but White has moved their king close enough to checkmate.)
4. Qd4 Kh1
5. Kg3 (of course not 5. Qxf2 stalemate)
5... f1=Q
6. Qh8+

and White checkmates in two more moves. Note that it is possible to win against a bishop pawn on the seventh rank and the king in the corner if the attacking king and queen are in the proper position. White wins if the king is close enough to move to one of the squares marked with dots in two moves.

==== Example from game ====
van Wely vs. Leko, 1996

Position: g8 white queen, h7 white king, c2 black pawn, a1 black king

Position after 60...c2, draw

This position from a 1996 game between Loek van Wely and Peter Leko was drawn because of the bishop pawn.

==== Petrosian versus Fischer ====
Petrosian vs. Fischer, 1958

Position: g8 black rook, f7 white pawn, g6 white pawn, g5 white king, c3 black pawn, c2 black king

Final position after 67.f7

Position: f8 white queen, g6 white king, c2 black pawn, b1 black king

Analysis position after 69...c2

The first position is from the end of a 1958 game between future World Champions Tigran Petrosian and Bobby Fischer. The players agreed to a draw because of the stalemate defense (above). The game could continue 67...Rxg6+ 68.Kxg6 Kb1 69.f8=Q c2 to the second position, which is a draw.

==== Traps ====
de la Villa, position 4.10

Position: d5 white king, e3 white queen, c2 black pawn, b1 black king

A trap for Black

There are some traps arising in the endgame with the bishop pawn when the attacking king is not quite close enough to force a win. In this position play could go:

1. Qb3+ Ka1! 2. Qe3 Kb1 3. Qe4 Kb2

3...Ka1 also draws.

4. Qe2

Setting the trap, and now

4... Ka1!

is the only move to draw. The alternative move 4...Kb1?? is a typical mistake, allowing 5.Kc4!! c1=Q+ 6.Kb3, winning. If instead 4...Kc3??, then 5.Qe5+!, forcing the black king to the wrong side of the pawn and then the white king will be close enough to assist.

de la Villa, position 4.12

Position: e5 white king, b3 white queen, c2 black pawn, d2 black king

Trap on the other side of the pawn

The same trick can be tried with the king on the other side of the pawn. The white king is not close enough to force a win in this position, but the defense is difficult.

1. Qb2 Kd1 2. Qb3 Kd2 3. Qa2!?

Setting the trap.

3... Kc3!

The only move to draw.

4. Qa1+ Kd2, draw

If instead 3...Kd1??, then 4.Kd4! c1=Q 5.Kd3 wins. If 3...Kd3??, then 4.Qb2 and Black has to allow a pin to avoid 5.Qc1. After 4...Kd2 the white king gets close enough to win with 5.Ke4.

=== Extra pawn for the defense ===
Müller & Lamprecht

Position: c8 white queen, h7 black pawn, b5 white king, f2 black pawn, g1 black king

White to move wins – the extra pawn deprives Black of the stalemate defense.

An extra pawn for the defense may be a disadvantage because it deprives the defender of the stalemate defense. In this position, White wins:

1. Qg4+ Kh2
2. Qf3! Kg1
3. Qg3+! Kf1

3...Kh1 loses after 4.Qxf2. If black did not have the extra pawn, this would be stalemate instead.

4. Kc4

and White wins.

== See also ==
- Chess endgame
