= Pal Benko =

Hungarian-American chess grandmaster (1928–2019)

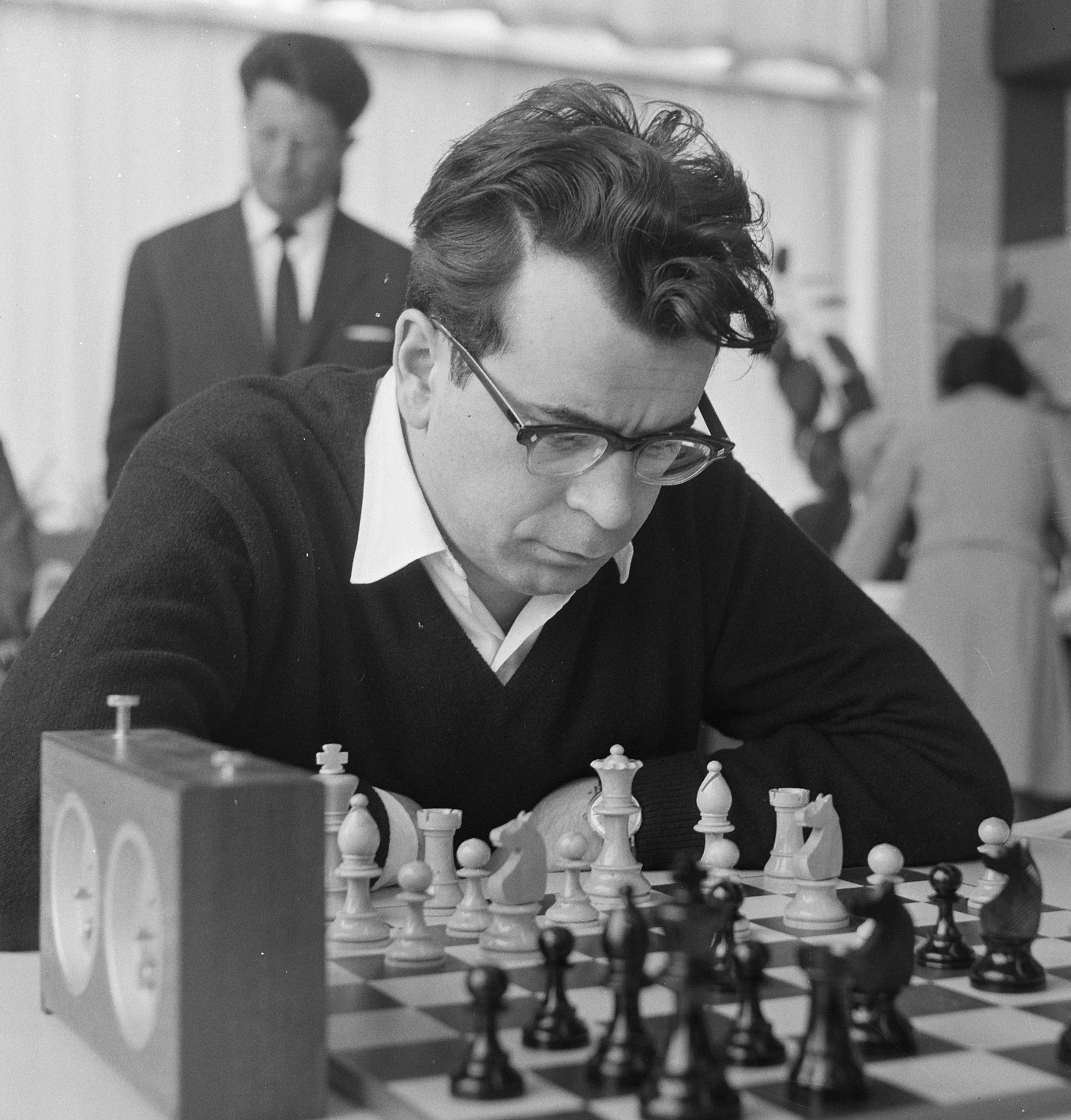
- Benko in 1964

Personal information
- Born: Pal Charles Benko; July 15, 1928 Amiens, France
- Died: August 25, 2019 (aged 91) (Note: The New York Times states that Benko died "on Monday" (in other words, August 26). However, according to ChessBase, Benko's wife wrote to Frederic Friedel: "Dear Frederic, sorry, my husband could not write to you, because he died on 25 of August.") Budapest, Hungary

Chess career
- Country: Hungary (before 1962); United States (after 1962)
- Title: Grandmaster (1958)
- Peak rating: 2530 (July 1973)

Pal Charles Benko (Hungarian: Benkő Pál; July 15, 1928 – August 25, 2019) was a Hungarian and American chess grandmaster, author, and composer of endgame studies and chess problems.

== Early life ==
Benko was born on July 15, 1928, in Amiens, France, where his Hungarian parents were on vacation. He was raised in Hungary. Benko learned to play chess aged eight from his father, but he did not compete in tournaments until age 17 due to World War II. During the war, he dug ditches for the Hungarian army before being captured by the Soviet army, which forced him to be a laborer. He eventually escaped to his home, only to find that his brother and father had been sent to Russia as laborers, and his mother died as the war neared its conclusion.

Benko made rapid progress once he began tournament play and became Hungarian champion by age 20. He was awarded the title of International Master in 1950. He qualified for the 1952 Interzonal tournament but was unable to compete as he was sent to a concentration camp in March 1952 for attempting to defect to the American embassy in West Berlin during a chess tournament in East Berlin. He starved and saw others around him die. He remained imprisoned for 16 months, attaining release after Stalin's death. He emigrated to the United States in 1958 after defecting following the World Student Team Championship in Reykjavík, Iceland, in 1957. FIDE awarded him the title of Grandmaster in 1958.

== World title candidate ==
Benko's highest achievement was qualifying and competing in the Candidates Tournament—the tournament to decide the challenger for the World Championship—in 1959 and 1962. Both tournaments had eight of the world's top players. He finished eighth in 1959 and sixth in 1962. In the next world championship cycle, he qualified for the 1964 Interzonal but failed to progress to the Candidates.

Benko also qualified for the 1970 Interzonal tournament, but gave up his spot to Bobby Fischer, who went on to win the World Championship in 1972.

== Other achievements ==
Benko finished in first place (or tied for first place) in eight U.S. Open Chess Championships, a record. His titles were: 1961, 1964, 1965, 1966, 1967, 1969, 1974, and 1975. He won the 1964 Canadian Open Chess Championship. He represented Hungary at the 1957 Student Olympiad in Reykjavík on board one, scoring 7½/12, and Hungary was fourth as a team. He had earlier played for the Hungarian national team at the Moscow 1956 Olympiad, on board three, scoring 10/15, and helping Hungary to team bronze. He moved to the United States, but it was not until 1962 that he appeared on the U.S. team. He would wind up on six teams in a row. At Varna 1962, Benko played board two, scored 8/12 for the silver medal on his board, and the U.S. finished fourth. At Tel Aviv 1964, he was again on board two, scored 9½/14, and the U.S. ended up sixth. At Havana 1966, Benko was on board three, scored 8/12, and the Americans won team silver. At Lugano 1968, he made 6/12 on board three, and the U.S. finished fourth. At Siegen 1970, Benko was on board four, scoring 8½/12, and the Americans again finished fourth. His last Olympiad was Skopje 1972, where he played on board three, made 9½/16, and the U.S. ended up ninth.

Benko defeated four players who held the World Champion title at some point. They are Bobby Fischer, Mikhail Tal, Tigran Petrosian, and Vassily Smyslov. His career score against Fischer was three wins, eight losses and seven draws. After Fischer retired, Benko was one of the few players with whom he maintained contact; reportedly, the two corresponded every week. According to Chessmetrics, at his best, Benko was ranked 17th in the world, with a peak rating of 2687.

== Later life and death ==
In later life, Benko was a tutor to many up-and-coming players from his native Hungary; his students included the Polgár sisters (Susan, Sofia, Judit Polgár) and Peter Leko. Benko had a column on chess endgames in Chess Life magazine, which is published by the United States Chess Federation, for decades: "In the Arena" (1972–1981), "Endgame Lab" (1981–2013), and chess problem column "Benko's Bafflers". In 2003 he revised Reuben Fine's book Basic Chess Endings. Benko died in Budapest on August 25, 2019, at the age of 91.

== Legacy ==
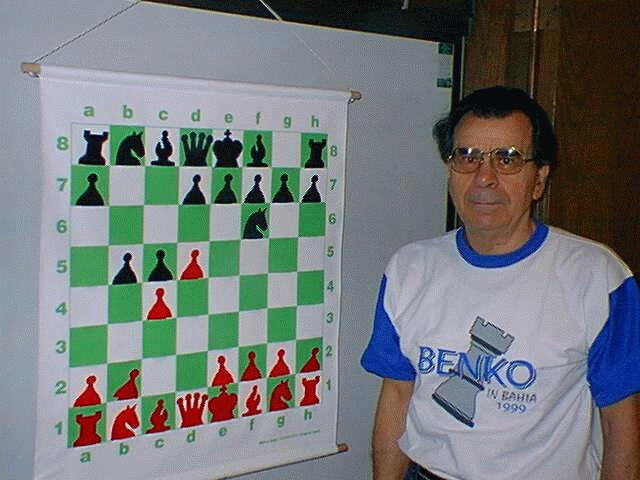
Benko in 2005 with the Benko Gambit position

Some chess openings Benko pioneered are named for him:

- The Benko Gambit (1.d4 Nf6 2.c4 c5 3.d5 b5), which he popularised and played with great success from the mid-1960s.
- Benko's Opening (1.g3), which he introduced at the 1962 Candidates Tournament, defeating Bobby Fischer and Mikhail Tal with it.

He was awarded the title of International Master of Chess Composition by FIDE, and was inducted into the U.S. Chess Hall of Fame in 1993.

== Books ==
- The Benko Gambit. 1974. RHM Press. ISBN 0-713-42912-7
- Winning with Chess Psychology by Pal Benko and Burt Hochberg. 1991. Random House Puzzles & Games ISBN 0-8129-1866-5
- Basic Chess Endings by Reuben Fine, revised by Pal Benko. 2003. Random House Puzzles & Games ISBN 0-8129-3493-8
- Pal Benko: My Life, Games and Compositions by Pal Benko, Jeremy Silman, and John L. Watson. 2004. Siles Press. ISBN 1-890085-08-1
- Pal Benko's Endgame Laboratory. 2007. Ishi Press. ISBN 978-0-923891-88-6

== Notable games ==
- Pal Benko vs. Viacheslav Ragozin, Budapest 1949, Budapest Gambit (A52), 1–0
- Laszlo Szabo vs. Pal Benko, Hungarian Championship 1951, Sicilian Defence, Sozin–Fischer Variation (B88), 0–1
- Pal Benko vs. Robert Fischer, Portoroz Interzonal 1958, King's Indian Defence, Saemisch Variation (E80), 1–0 The young Fischer would later qualify, but he loses in this game.
- Pal Benko vs. Fridrik Olafsson, Yugoslavia Candidates' tournament 1959, Sicilian Defence, Najdorf Variation (B99), 1–0
- Pal Benko vs. Robert Fischer, Buenos Aires 1960, King's Indian Defence, Fianchetto Variation (E62), 1–0
- Pal Benko vs. Samuel Reshevsky, New York match 1960, Grunfeld Defence (D76), 1–0 Benko lost the match, but he scores a win here.
- Pal Benko vs. Robert Fischer, Curacao Candidates' tournament 1962, Benko's Opening (A00), 1–0 Benko introduces an original opening scheme (1.g3), and defeats Bobby Fischer.
- Pal Benko vs. Mikhail Tal, Curacao Candidates' tournament 1962, Benko's Opening (A00), 1–0
- Pal Benko vs. Paul Keres, Curacao Candidates' tournament 1962, King's Indian Attack, Keres Variation (A07), 1–0 A loss for Keres, who had beaten Benko in the three previous cycles of the tournament; it costs him a chance to qualify for the world championship match.
- Milan Vukic vs. Pal Benko, Sarajevo 1967, Benko Gambit (A58), 0–1 Benko plays the Benko Gambit for the first time.
- Igor Zaitsev vs. Pal Benko, Solnak 1974, Benko Gambit (A57), 0–1
- Pal Benko vs. Yasser Seirawan, Lone Pine 1978, English Opening, Symmetrical Variation (A34), 1–0
