= List of chess books (M–S) =

This is a list of chess books that are used as references in articles related to chess. The list is organized by alphabetical order of the author's surname, then the author's first name, then the year of publication, then the alphabetical order of title.

As a general rule, only the original edition should be listed except when different editions bring additional encyclopedic value. Examples of exceptions include:

- When various editions are different enough to be considered as nearly a different book, for example for opening encyclopedias when each edition is completely revised and has even different authors (example: Modern Chess Openings).
- When the book is too old to have an ID (ISBN, OCLC number, ...) that makes it easy for the reader to find it. In that case, both the first and the last edition can be indicated (example: My 60 Memorable Games).

Authors with five books or more have a sub-section title on their own, to increase the usability of the table of contents (see at right). When a book was written by several authors, it is listed once under the name of each author.

== M ==
- Maddox, Don (2002). Königsindischer Angriff - Schach Training (in German). Hamburg: ChessBase. ISBN 3-935602-51-0.
- Maizelis, I.; Averbakh, Yuri (1974). Comprehensive Chess Endings: Pawn Endings. Chess Digest (1974 ed.); Elsevier Science & Technology (1987 ed.). ISBN 978-0-08-032043-4.
- Maizelis, Ilya (1960). The Soviet Chess Primer. Quality Chess (2014 ed.). ISBN 978-1-907982-99-6.
- Manson, John F.; Hoover, Todd (1992). Siamese Chess. How To Play...How to Win!. Farnsworth. ASIN B0006PFGZS.
- Marache, Napoleon (1866). Marache's Manual of Chess. Dick & Fitzgerald.
- Margulies, Stuart; Fischer, R.J.; Mosenfelder, Donn (1972). Bobby Fischer Teaches Chess. Bantam Books. ISBN 0-553-26315-3.

=== Marin, Mihail ===
- Marin, Mihail (2003). Secrets of Chess Defence. Gambit Publications. ISBN 1-901983-91-9.
- Marin, Mihail (2004). Learn from the Legends: Chess Champions at Their Best. Quality Chess. ISBN 91-975243-2-8.
- Marin, Mihail (2005). Secrets of Attacking Chess. Gambit Publications. ISBN 1-904600-30-1.
- Marin, Mihail (2007). Beating the Open Games. Quality Chess. ISBN 978-91-976004-3-9.
- Marin, Mihail (2007). A Spanish Opening Repertoire for Black. Quality Chess. ISBN 978-91-976005-0-7.
- Marin, Mihail; Garrett, Yuri (2009). Reggio Emilia 2007/2008. Quality Chess. ISBN 978-1-906552-32-9.

- Markoš, Ján (2008). Beat the KID. Quality Chess. ISBN 978-1-906552-15-2.

=== Marović, Dražen ===
- Marović, Dražen (1992). Play the Queen's Gambit. Cadogan Books. ISBN 1-85744-016-1.
- Marović, Dražen (2000). Understanding Pawn Play In Chess. Gambit. ISBN 1-901983-31-5.
- Marović, Dražen (2001). Dynamic Pawn Play in Chess. Gambit. ISBN 1-85744-016-1.
- Marović, Dražen (2003). Secrets of Positional Chess. Gambit. ISBN 1-901983-73-0.
- Marović, Dražen (2004). Secrets of Chess Transformations. Gambit. ISBN 1-904600-14-X.

- Maróczy, Géza; Alekhine, Alexander; Kmoch, Hans; Nimzowitsch, Aron (1928). Das erste International Schachturnier in Kecskemet 1927 (in German).
- Martin, Andrew (2001). Alekhine's Defence. Everyman Chess. ISBN 1-85744-253-9.
- Martin, Andrew (2005). The Hippopotamus Rises: The Re-emergence of a Chess Opening. Batsford. ISBN 0-7134-8989-8.
- Martin, Andrew (2005). Starting Out: The Sicilian Dragon. Everyman Chess. ISBN 1-85744-398-5.
- Mason, James (1947). The Art of Chess. Dover. ISBN 0-486-20463-4.

=== Matanović, Aleksandar ===
- Matanović, Aleksandar; Barcza, Gedeon (1974). Encyclopedia of Chess Openings, volume C (1st ed.). Belgrade: Chess Informant. ISBN 0-7134-2775-2.
- Matanović, Aleksandar; Botvinnik, Mikhail (1975). Encyclopedia of Chess Openings, volume B (1st ed.). Belgrade: Chess Informant. ISBN 0-7134-3013-3.
- Matanović, Aleksandar; Abramov, Lev (1977). Encyclopedia of Chess Openings, volume D (1st ed.). Belgrade: Chess Informant. ISBN 0-7134-3210-1.
- Matanović, Aleksandar; Abramov, Lev (1978). Encyclopedia of Chess Openings, volume E (1st ed.). Belgrade: Chess Informant. ISBN 0-7134-1044-2.
- Matanović, Aleksandar; Abramov, Lev (1979). Encyclopedia of Chess Openings, volume A (1st ed.). Belgrade: Chess Informant. ISBN 0-7134-1912-1.
- Matanović, Aleksandar; Barcza, Gedeon (1981). Encyclopedia of Chess Openings, volume C (2nd ed.). Belgrade: Chess Informant. ISBN 0-7134-2697-7.
- Matanović, Aleksandar (1982). Encyclopedia of Chess Endings. Chess Informant.
- Matanović, Aleksandar; Abramov, Lev; Bagirov, Vladimir; Botvinnik, Mikhail; Cvetkovic, Srdan; Filip, Miroslav; Geller, Efim; Gipslis, Aivars; Gufeld, Eduard; Hort, Vlastimil; Kasparov, Garry; Korchnoi, Viktor; Krnic, Zdenko; Larsen, Bent; Minev, Nikolay; Nunn, John; Parma, Bruno; Polugaevsky, Lev; Suetin, Alexey; Sveshnikov, Evgeny; Taimanov, Mark; Ugrinovic, Dragan; Uhlmann, Wolfgang (1984). Encyclopedia of Chess Openings, volume B (2nd ed.). Belgrade: Chess Informant. ISBN 0-7134-3716-2.
- Matanović, Aleksandar; Bagirov, Vladimir (1987). Encyclopedia of Chess Openings, volume D (2nd ed.). Belgrade: Chess Informant. ISBN 86-7297-008-X.
- Matanović, Aleksandar (1991). Encyclopedia of Chess Openings, volume E. Belgrade: Chess Informant.
- Matanović, Aleksandar; Krnić, Zdenko (1996). Encyclopedia of Chess Openings, volume A (2nd ed.). Belgrade: Chess Informant.
- Matanović, Aleksandar; Bjelacec, Milan (1997). Encyclopedia of Chess Openings, volume B (3rd ed.). Belgrade: Chess Informant. ISBN 86-7297-032-2.
- Matanović, Aleksandar; Krnić, Zdenko (1997). Encyclopedia of Chess Openings, volume C (3rd ed.). Belgrade: Chess Informant. ISBN 86-7297-035-7.
- Matanović, Aleksandar; Krnić, Zdenko (1998). Encyclopedia of Chess Openings, volume D (3rd ed.). Belgrade: Chess Informant. ISBN 86-7297-040-3.
- Matanović, Aleksandar; Krnić, Zdenko (1998). Encyclopedia of Chess Openings, volume E. Belgrade: Chess Informant. ISBN 86-7297-041-1.
- Matanović, Aleksandar; Krnić, Zdenko (2004). Encyclopedia of Chess Openings, volume D. Belgrade: Chess Informant. ISBN 86-7297-052-7.
- Matanović, Aleksandar; Krnić, Zdenko (2006). Encyclopedia of Chess Openings, volume C (5th ed.). Belgrade: Chess Informant. ISBN 86-7297-054-3.

- Matthews, Robert Charles Oliver; Lipton, Michael; Rice, John (1963). Chess Problems: Introduction to an Art. Faber & Faber.
- Maxwell, Jonathan (1999). Blitz Theory: How to Win at Blitz Chess. Silent Lyric Productions, Inc. ISBN 0-9677752-0-5.
- Mayer, Steve (1997). Bishop versus Knight: The Verdict. Batsford. ISBN 1-879479-73-7.
- McCormick, Gene; Soltis, Andrew (1986). The U.S. Chess Championship, 1845–1985. McFarland. ISBN 0-89950-056-0.

=== McDonald, Neil ===
- McDonald, Neil (1996). Practical Endgame Play. Everyman Chess. ISBN 978-1-85744-176-5.
- McDonald, Neil (2002). Concise Chess Endings. Everyman Chess. ISBN 978-1-85744-313-4.
- McDonald, Neil (2004). Benko Gambit Revealed. Batsford. ISBN 978-0-7134-8868-5.
- McDonald, Neil (2004). Starting out: The Dutch Defence. Everyman Chess. ISBN 1-85744-377-2.
- McDonald, Neil (2006). Starting Out: Queen's Gambit Declined. Everyman Chess. ISBN 978-1-85744-426-1.
- McDonald, Neil (2006). Rudolph Spielmann Master Of Invention. Everyman Chess. ISBN 978-1-85744-406-3.
- McDonald, Neil (2007). Chess Secrets: The Giants of Strategy. Everyman Chess. ISBN 978-1-85744-541-1.
- McDonald, Neil (2008). Chess Success: Planning After the Opening. Batsford. ISBN 978-0-7134-9071-8.
- McDonald, Neil (2009). Chess Secrets: The Giants of Power Play. Everyman Chess. ISBN 978-1-85744-597-8.

- McNab, Colin; Nunn, John (1998). The Ultimate Pirc. Batsford.

=== Mednis, Edmar ===
- Mednis, Edmar (1975). How Karpov Wins. David Mc Kay. ISBN 978-0-679-13045-1.
- Mednis, Edmar (1978). Practical Endgame Lessons. David Mc Kay. ASIN B000PKWK2Q.
- Mednis, Edmar (1982). Practical Rook Endings. Chess Enterprises. ISBN 0-931462-16-9.
- Mednis, Edmar (1987). Questions and Answers on Practical Endgame Play. Chess Enterprises. ISBN 0-931462-69-X.
- Mednis, Edmar (1990). Practical Bishop Endings. Chess Enterprises. ISBN 0-945470-04-5.
- Mednis, Edmar (1993). Practical Knight Endings. Chess Enterprises. ISBN 0-945470-35-5.
- Mednis, Edmar (1998). How to Beat Bobby Fischer. Dover. ISBN 0-486-29844-2.
- Mednis, Edmar (1998). Practical Endgame Tips. Cadogan Chess. ISBN 1-85744-213-X.

- Meiden, Walter; Euwe, Max (1966). The Road to Chess Mastery: A Sure Way to Improve Your Game. David McKay. ISBN 0-679-14525-7.
- Melts, Michael (2002). Scandinavian Defense: The Dynamic 3...Qd6. Russell Enterprises. ISBN 978-1-888690-11-8.

=== Mikhalchishin, Adrian ===
- Mikhalchishin, Adrian; Beliavsky, Alexander (1995). Winning Endgame Technique. Batsford. ISBN 0-7134-7512-9.
- Mikhalchishin, Adrian; Beliavsky, Alexander (1998). Fianchetto Grunfeld. Everyman Chess. ISBN 978-1-85744-204-5.
- Mikhalchishin, Adrian; Beliavsky, Alexander (1999). The Two Knights Defense. Batsford. ISBN 978-0-7134-8441-0.
- Mikhalchishin, Adrian; Beliavsky, Alexander (2000). Winning Endgame Strategy. Batsford. ISBN 0-7134-8446-2.
- Mikhalchishin, Adrian; Beliavsky, Alexander (2002). Secrets of Chess Intuition. Gambit Publications. ISBN 1-901983-52-8.
- Mikhalchishin, Adrian; Beliavsky, Alexander (2003). Modern Endgame Practice. Batsford. ISBN 0-7134-8740-2.

- Miles, Tony; Moskow, Eric (1979). Sicilian Dragon: Yugoslav Attack. Batsford. ISBN 0-7134-2029-4.
- Minev, Nikolay; Seirawan, Yasser (1991). Take My Rooks. International Chess Enterprises. ISBN 1-879479-01-X.
- Minev, Nikolay; Donaldson, John W. (1992). Alekhine in the Americas. International Chess Enterprises. ISBN 978-1-879479-06-7.
- Minev, Nikolay (2004). A Practical Guide to Rook Endgames. Russell. ISBN 1-888690-22-4.
- Missiaen, Roger; Vandecasteele, Ignace; Vandiest, Julien (1998). Flemish miniatures. 123 chess endgame studies. J. Vandiest, R. Missiaen, I. Vandecasteele. ISBN 90-90-11612-5.
- Modr, Břetislav; Veselý, Jiří (2005). 100 let organizovaného šachu v českých zemích. Příbram. ISBN 80-86595-14-5.
- du Mont, Julius; Tartakower, Savielly (1975). 100 Master Games of Modern Chess. Dover Publications.
- du Mont, Julius (1978). The Basis of Combination in Chess. Dover. ISBN 0-486-23644-7.
- Moran, Pablo (1989). A. ALEKHINE Agony of a Chess Genius. McFarland. ISBN 0-89950-440-X.
- Morrison, Stanley; Bott, Raymond (1966). The Chess Player's Bedside Book. Faber & Faber.
- Morse, Jeremy (1995). Chess Problems Tasks and Records. Faber & Faber. ISBN 0-571-15363-1.
- Mortazavi, Ali (1996). The Fine Art of Swindling. Cadogan Books. ISBN 1-85744-105-2.
- Mosenfelder, Donn; Fischer, R.J.; Margulies, Stuart (1972). Bobby Fischer Teaches Chess. Bantam Books. ISBN 0-553-26315-3.
- Moskalenko, Viktor (2007). The Fabulous Budapest Gambit. New In Chess. ISBN 978-90-5691-224-6.
- Moskalenko, Viktor (2008). The Flexible French. New In Chess. ISBN 978-90-5691-245-1.
- Moskalenko, Viktor (2009). Revolutionize Your Chess. New In Chess. ISBN 978-90-5691-295-6.
- Moskalenko, Viktor (2010). The Wonderful Winawer. New In Chess. ISBN 978-90-5691-327-4.
- Morley, Frank Vigor (1946) My One Contribution to Chess via HathiTrust

=== Motwani, Paul ===
- Motwani, Paul (1997). H.O.T. Chess. Intl Chess Enterprises. ISBN 1-879479-43-5.
- Motwani, Paul (1997). C.O.O.L. Chess. Intl Chess Enterprises. ISBN 1-879479-51-6.
- Motwani, Paul (1998). S.T.A.R. Chess. Gambit. ISBN 1-901983-03-X.
- Motwani, Paul (1999). The Most Instructive Games of the Young Grandmasters. Everyman Chess. ISBN 1-85744-534-1.
- Motwani, Paul (1999). Chess Under the Microscope. Sterling Pub Co Inc. ISBN 0-7134-8390-3.

- Movsesian, Sergei; Klima, Lukas (2009). Czech Open: Pardubice Phenomenon. Caissa Hungary. ISBN 978-80-86725-08-6.

=== Müller, Karsten ===
- Müller, Karsten; Lamprecht, Franck (2000). Secrets of Pawn Endings. Everyman Chess. ISBN 978-1-85744-255-7.
- Müller, Karsten; Lamprecht, Franck (2001). Fundamental Chess Endings. Gambit Publications. ISBN 1-901983-53-6.
- Müller, Karsten; Meyer, Claus Dieter (2002). The Magic of Chess Tactics. Russell Enterprises. ISBN 1-888690-14-3.
- Müller, Karsten (2004). The ChessCafe Puzzle Book: Test and Improve Your Tactical Vision. Russell Enterprises. ISBN 978-1-888690-21-7.
- Müller, Karsten (2008). The ChessCafe Puzzle Book 2: Test and Improve Your Positional Intuition. Russell Enterprises. ISBN 978-1-888690-43-9.
- Müller, Karsten; Pajeken, Wolfgang (2008). How to Play Chess Endgames. Gambit Publications. ISBN 978-1-904600-86-2.
- Müller, Karsten; Knaak, Rainer (2008). 222 Opening Traps - after 1.d4. Edition Olms. ISBN 978-3-283-01004-1.

- Münninghoff, Alexander (2001). Max Euwe: The Biography. New in Chess. ISBN 978-1-58863-002-5.
- Murray, H. J. R. (1913). A History of Chess. Benjamin Press. ISBN 0-936317-01-9.

== N ==
- Nakamura, Hikaru; Harper, Bruce (2009). Bullet Chess: One Minute to Mate. Russell Enterprises. ISBN 978-1-888690-67-5.
- Naroditsky, Daniel (2010). Mastering Positional Chess. New In Chess. ISBN 978-90-5691-310-6.
- Neishtadt, Yakov (1987). Play the Catalan: Open Variation. Pergamon. ISBN 0-08-029741-2.
- Neishtadt, Yakov (2002). Win In The Opening!: Opening Mistakes And How To Punish Them. Edition Olms. ISBN 978-3-283-00402-6.
- Nesis, Gennady; Shulman, Leonid (1993). Tactics in the King's Indian. Translated by Gesthuysen, Malcolm. Henry Holt & Co. ISBN 978-0-8050-2639-9.
- Newborn, Monty (1997). Kasparov versus Deep Blue: Computer Chess Comes of Age. Springer. ISBN 0-387-94820-1.
- Newborn, Monty; Levy, David (1991). How Computers Play Chess. Computer Science Press. ISBN 0-7167-8121-2.
- Nielsen, Peter Heine; Hansen, Carsten (2006). Sicilian Accelerated Dragon. Sterling Pub. ISBN 978-0-7134-8947-7.
- Nimzowitsch, Aron (1925). Blockade. Chess Enterprises (1980 ed.). ISBN 978-0-931462-07-8.
- Nimzowitsch, Aron (1925). My System. Schachverlag Bernhard Kagan (1925 ed.), Hays Publishing (1991 ed.). ISBN 1-880673-85-1. (1991 ed.).
- Nimzowitsch, Aron; Alekhine, Alexander; Kmoch, Hans; Maróczy, Géza (1928). Das erste International Schachturnier in Kecskemet 1927 (in German).
- Nimzowitsch, Aron (1936). Chess Praxis. Hays Publishing (1993 ed.). ISBN 1-880673-91-6. (1993 ed.).
- Nor, Igor; Gershon, Alik (2006). San Luis 2005: How Chess Found Its Champion. Quality Chess. ISBN 91-976005-2-0.
- Norwood, David (1991). King's Indian Attack. Trends Publications.
- Norwood, David (1994). The Modern Benoni. London: Cadogan Books. ISBN 1-85744-037-4.

=== Nunn, John ===
- Nunn, John (1981). Tactical Chess Endings. Batsford. ISBN 0-7134-5937-9.
- Nunn, John (1982). The Benoni for the Tournament Player. London: B. T. Batsford Ltd. ISBN 0-7134-3528-3.
- Nunn, John (1985). Solving in Style. Gambit Publications. ISBN 1-901983-66-8.
- Nunn, John (1993). Secrets of Rook Endings. Henry Holt. ISBN 0-8050-2640-1.
- Nunn, John (1994). Secrets of Pawnless Endings. Henry Holt. ISBN 0-8050-3285-1.
- Nunn, John; Gallagher, Joe (1995). Beating the Sicilian 3. Henry Holt. ISBN 0-8050-4227-X.
- Nunn, John (1995). Secrets of Minor-Piece Endings. Batsford. ISBN 0-8050-4228-8.
- Nunn, John; Burgess, Graham; Emms, John (1998). The Mammoth Book of the World's Greatest Chess Games. Carroll & Graf. ISBN 978-0-7867-0587-0.
- Nunn, John; McNab, Colin (1998). The Ultimate Pirc. Batsford. ISBN 0-7134-8221-4.
- Nunn, John (1999). Nunn's Chess Openings. Everyman Chess. ISBN 1-85744-221-0.
- Nunn, John (1999). Complete Najdorf: Modern Lines. Sterling Pub Co Inc. ISBN 0-7134-8218-4.
- Nunn, John (2001). Understanding Chess Move by Move. Gambit. ISBN 978-1-901983-41-8.
- Nunn, John (2007). Secrets of Practical Chess. Gambit Publications. ISBN 978-1-904600-70-1.
- Nunn, John (2009). Understanding Chess Endgames. Gambit Publications. ISBN 978-1-906454-11-1.
- Nunn, John (2010). Nunn's Chess Endings, Volume 1. Gambit Publications. ISBN 978-1-906454-21-0.

== O ==
- O'Connell, Kevin; Levy, David (1981). Oxford Encyclopedia of Chess Games, Volume 1 (1485–1866). Oxford University Press. ISBN 0-19-217571-8.
- O'Connell, Kevin; Levy, David (1987). How to Play the Sicilian Defense. Macmillan Publishers. ISBN 0-02-029191-4.
- O'Kelly de Galway, Albéric (1969). The Sicilian Flank Game (Najdorf Variation). Batsford. ISBN 978-0-7134-0351-0.
- O'Kelly de Galway, Albéric (1976). Assess Your Chess Fast: From Expert to Master. Batsford. ISBN 978-0-7134-1055-6.
- Obodchuk, Andrey (2011). The Four Knights Game. New in Chess. ISBN 978-90-5691-372-4.
- Odessky, Ilya (2008). Play 1.b3!. New In Chess. ISBN 978-90-5691-256-7.
- Olson, Calvin (2006). The Chess Kings Volume One. Trafford. ISBN 1-4120-3907-X.
- Orlov, Georgi (1992). Black Knights' Tango. Batsford. ISBN 1-879479-03-6.

== P ==
=== Pachman, Luděk ===
- Pachman, Luděk (1971). Modern Chess Strategy. Dover Publications. ISBN 0-486-20290-9.
- Pachman, Luděk (1972). Modern Chess Tactics. Routledge & Kegan Paul Ltd. ISBN 0-7100-7098-5.
- Pachman, Luděk (1973). Attack and Defense in Modern Chess Tactics. David McKay.
- Pachman, Luděk (1975). Complete Chess Strategy, Volume 1: First Principles of the Middle Game. Cornerstone Library.
- Pachman, Luděk (1975). Decisive Games in Chess History (originally published as Pachman's Decisive Games). Dover. ISBN 0-486-25323-6.
- Pachman, Luděk (1976). Complete Chess Strategy, Volume 2: Principles of Pawn Play and the Center. Cornerstone Library.
- Pachman, Luděk (1978). Complete Chess Strategy: Play on the Wings. David McKay. ISBN 0-679-13252-X.
- Pachman, Luděk (1983). Opening game in chess. Routledge. ISBN 978-0-7100-9222-9.

- Pacioli, Luca (1500). De ludo scacchorum.
- Pajeken, Wolfgang; Müller, Karsten (2008). How to Play Chess Endings. Gambit Publications. ISBN 978-1-904600-86-2.

=== Palliser, Richard ===
- Palliser, Richard (2003). Play 1 d4 !. London: B. T. Batsford Ltd. ISBN 0-7134-8809-3.
- Palliser, Richard (2005). Tango! A Dynamic Answer to 1 d4. Everyman Chess. ISBN 1-85744-388-8.
- Palliser, Richard (2005). The Modern Benoni Revealed. London: B. T. Batsford Ltd. ISBN 0-7134-8982-0.
- Palliser, Richard (2006). Beating Unusual Chess Openings. Everyman Chess. ISBN 1-85744-429-9.
- Palliser, Richard (2006). Starting Out: Closed Sicilian. Everyman Chess. ISBN 978-1-85744-414-8.
- Palliser, Richard (2007). Starting Out: Scilian Najdorf. Everyman Chess. ISBN 978-1-85744-601-2.
- Palliser, Richard (2007). Starting out: the Colle. Everyman Chess. ISBN 978-1-85744-527-5.
- Palliser, Richard (2008). Starting out: d-pawn attacks. The Colle-Zukertort, Barry and 150 Attacks. Everyman Chess. ISBN 978-1-85744-578-7.
- Palliser, Richard; Kosten, Tony; Vigus, James (2008). Dangerous Weapons: Flank Openings. Everyman Chess. ISBN 978-1-85744-583-1.
- Palliser, Richard (2009). Starting Out: the Trompowsky Attack. Everyman Chess. ISBN 978-1-85744-562-6.
- Palliser, Richard (2011). Chess Developments: The Modern Benoni. London: Everyman Chess. ISBN 978-1-857446-81-4.

- Panczyk, Krzysztof; Ilczuk, Jacek (2002). The Cambridge Springs. Gambit Publications. ISBN 1-901983-68-4.
- Panczyk, Krzysztof; Ilczuk, Jacek (2004). Offbeat King's Indian. Everyman Chess. ISBN 978-1-85744-361-5.
- Panczyk, Krzysztof; Ilczuk, Jacek (2009). The Classical King's Indian Uncovered. Everyman Chess. ISBN 978-1-85744-517-6.
- Pandolfini, Bruce, ed. (1988). The Best of Chess Life and Review Volume 1. Simon & Schuster. ISBN 0-671-61986-1.
- Pandolfini, Bruce (1988). Pandolfini's Endgame Course. Fireside, Simon & Schuster. ISBN 978-0-671-65688-1.
- Pandolfini, Bruce (1995). The Chess Doctor: Surefire Cures for What Ails Your Game. Fireside, Simon & Schuster. ISBN 0-684-80121-3.
- Pandolfini, Bruce (1996). Chess Thinking: The Visual Dictionary of Chess Moves, Rules, Strategies and Concepts. Everyman Chess. ISBN 1-85744-480-9.
- Parlett, David (1999). The Oxford History of Board Games. Oxford University Press. ISBN 0-19-212998-8.
- Parr, Larry; Denker, Arnold (1995). The Bobby Fischer I Knew And Other Stories. Hypermodern Press. ISBN 978-1-886040-18-2.
- Pavlovic, Milos (2009). Fighting The Ruy Lopez. Globe Pequot. ISBN 978-1-85744-590-9.
- Pedersen, Steffen (1999). Gambit Guide to the Bogo Indian. Gambit. ISBN 1-901983-04-8.
- Penn, David A.; Dizon, Rommel (1998). Comprehensive Bughouse Chess. Graham Cracker Studios. ISBN 0-9669806-0-3.
- Peres, Aguilera; Alekhine, Alexander (1945). Ajedrez Hupermoderno: estudio de las escuelas ajedrecistas a traves de una selection de partidas de grandes maestros de todas las epocas (in Spanish). Castilla.
- van Perlo; Gerardus C. (2006). van Perlo's Endgame Tactics. New In Chess. ISBN 978-90-5691-168-3.
- Pervakov, Oleg; Dvoretsky, Mark (2009). Studies for Practical Players. Russell Enterprises. ISBN 978-1-888690-64-4.
- Petrov, Marian (2013). Grandmaster Repertoire 12–The Modern Benoni. Glasgow: Quality Chess UK. ISBN 978-1-907982-59-0.
- Petursson, Margeir (1996). King's Indian Defense: Averbakh Variation. Cadogan Books. ISBN 978-1-85744-118-5.

=== Pfleger, Helmut ===
- Pfleger, Helmut; Kurz, Eugen (1982). Schach: TV-Worldcup '82 Turnier Der Schachgrossmeister Karpow, Spasski, Timman, Seirawan, Torre, Nunn, Bouaziz, Lobron (in German). Falken-Verlag. ISBN 3-8068-4133-0.
- Pfleger, Helmut; Darga, Klaus (1983). Die Besten Partien Deutscher Schachgrossmeister: Klaus Darga, Hans-J. Hecht, Robert Hübner, Barbara Hund, Erik Lobron, Helmut Pfleger, Lothar Schmid, Wolfgang Unzicker (in German). Falken. ISBN 3-8068-4121-7.
- Pfleger, Helmut; Metzing, Horst (1984). Schach: Spiel, Sport, Wissenschaft, Kunst (in German). Hoffmann und Campe. ISBN 3-455-08228-9.
- Pfleger, Helmut; Kishon, Ephraim; Weiner, Ossi (1986). Der Schachcomputer: Gegner Und Freund (in German). Nymphenburger. ISBN 3-485-01696-9.
- Pfleger, Helmut; Treppner, Gerd (1989). Chess: The Mechanics of the Mind. Trafalgar Square. ISBN 1-85223-127-0.

- Philidor, François-André Danican (1749). Analyse du jeu des échecs (in French). London: P. Elmsley (1777 ed.).
- Pickard, Sid (1995). Hastings 1895: The Centennial Edition. Pickard & Son. ISBN 1-886846-01-4.
- Pickett (1984). The Old Indian Renewed. Nottingham: The Chess Player. ISBN 0-906042-53-4.
- Piket, Jeroen; Guéneau, Christophe; Polugaevsky, Lev (1995). Sicilian Love: Lev Polugaevsky Chess Tournament, Bueno Aires 1994. New in Chess. ISBN 90-71689-99-9.
- Pinski, Jan (2002). Classical Dutch. Everyman Chess. ISBN 1-85744-307-1.
- Pinski, Jan (2003). The Two Knights Defence. Everyman Chess. ISBN 1-85744-283-0.
- Pinski, Jan (2005). The Benko Gambit. Quality Chess. ISBN 978-91-975243-8-4.
- Pinski, Jan (2009). The King's Gambit. Quality Chess. ISBN 978-91-976004-9-1.
- Pintér, József (2006). 1000 Pawn Endings. Magyar Sakkvilág. ISBN 963-87170-0-9.
- Pintér, József (2007). 1000 Minor Piece Endings. Caissa Hungary. ISBN 978-9-639-7500-8-1. OCLC 778025736. The ISBN in the book may be misprinted as 978-978-9-639-7500-8-1, additional OCLC 271533364 ASIN B00IA1EGMY.
- Pintér, József (2007). 1000 Rook Endings. Magyar Sakkvilág. ISBN 978-963-9750-00-5.

=== Plaskett, James ===
- Plaskett, James; Keene, Raymond; Tisdall, Jon (1987). The English Defence. Batsford. ISBN 978-0-7134-1322-9.
- Plaskett, James (1988). Playing to Win. Rowman Littlefield. ISBN 978-0-7134-5844-2.
- Plaskett, James (1997). The Sicilian Taimanov. Everyman Chess. ISBN 978-1-901259-01-8.
- Plaskett, James (2000). Sicilian Grand Prix Attack. Everyman Chess. ISBN 978-1-85744-291-5.
- Plaskett, James (2000). Coincidences. Tamworth Press. ISBN 978-0-9509441-6-6.
- Plaskett, James (2002). Can You Be a Tactical Chess Genius?. Everyman Chess. ISBN 978-1-85744-259-5.
- Plaskett, James (2004). The Scandinavian Defence. Batsford. ISBN 0-7134-8911-1.
- Plaskett, James (2004). Starting Out: Attacking Play. Everyman Chess. ISBN 978-1-85744-367-7.
- Plaskett, James (2005). Catastrophe In The Opening. Everyman Chess. ISBN 978-1-85744-390-5.
- Plaskett, James (2005). Queen's Bishop Attack Revealed. Batsford. ISBN 978-0-7134-8970-5.

- Plisetsky, Dimitry; Voronkov, Sergey (2005). Russians versus Fischer. Everyman Chess. ISBN 1-85744-380-2.
- Polak, Tomas (2008). Rook Against Two Pieces. Sachy.
- Polgar, Susan (2006). Chess Tactics for Champions. Random House Puzzles & Games. ISBN 978-0-8129-3671-1.
- Polugaevsky, Lev (1981). Grandmaster Preparation. Pergamon Press. ISBN 0-08-024098-4.
- Polugaevsky, Lev (1984). Damengambit, Tschigorin System bis Tarrasch-Verteidigung (in German). Sportverlag Berlin.
- Polugaevsky, Lev; Damsky, Yakov (1988). The Art of Defence in Chess. Pergamon Press. ISBN 0-08-032058-9.
- Polugaevsky, Lev; Guéneau, Christophe; Piket, Jeroen (1995). Sicilian Love: Lev Polugaevsky Chess Tournament, Bueno Aires 1994. New in Chess. ISBN 90-71689-99-9.
- Portisch, Lajos; Sárközy, Balázs (1981). Six Hundred Endings. Pergamon Press. ISBN 0-08-024137-9.
- Prandstetter, Eduard; Balashov, Yuri (1992). Basic Endgames. Prague Chess Agency. ISBN 80-901056-0-2.
- Pritchard, David (1994). The Encyclopedia of Chess Variants. Games & Puzzles Publications. ISBN 0-9524142-0-1.
- Pritchard, David (2000). Popular Chess Variants. Bastford Chess Books. ISBN 0-7134-8578-7.
- Pritchard, David (2007). The Classified Encyclopedia of Chess Variants. John Beasley. ISBN 978-0-9555168-0-1.
- Pritchard, David (1970). Begin Chess. Constable & Robinson. ISBN 978-0-7160-2100-1.
- Pritchett, Craig; Kopec, Danny (2002). Chess World Title Contenders and Their Styles. Dover. ISBN 978-0-486-42233-6.
- Pritchett, Craig (2006). Sicilian Scheveningen. Everyman Chess. ISBN 978-1-85744-413-1.
- Pritchett, Craig (2008). Play the English. Everyman Chess. ISBN 978-1-85744-545-9.
- Przewoznik, Jan; Pein, Malcolm (1991). The Blumenfeld Gambit. Pergamon Chess. ISBN 0-08-037132-9.
- Przewoznik, Jan; Soszynski, Marek (2001). How to Think in Chess. Russell Enterprises. ISBN 978-1-888690-10-1.
- Psakhis, Lev (2003). The Complete Benoni. Sterling Pub. ISBN 0-7134-7765-2.
- Psakhis, Lev (2003). Advance and Other Anti-French Variations. Batsford. ISBN 978-0-7134-8843-2.
- Psakhis, Lev (2003). French Defence 3 Nd2. Sterling Pub. ISBN 978-0-7134-8825-8.
- Purdy, Cecil (2003). C.J.S. Purdy on the Endgame. Thinker's Press. ISBN 1-888710-03-9.

== R ==
- Raetsky, Alexander; Chetverik, Maxim (2005). Petroff Defence. Everyman Chess. ISBN 1-85744-378-0.
- Raetsky, Alexander; Chetverik, Maxim (2006). Queen's Gambit Accepted. Everyman Chess. ISBN 1-85744-415-9.
- Raetsky, Alexander; Chetverik, Maxim (2006). Boris Spassky: Master of Initiative. Everyman Chess. ISBN 1-85744-425-6.
- Raetsky, Alexander; Chetverik, Maxim (2007). Classical Sicilian. Everyman Chess. ISBN 978-1-85744-537-4.
- Ranken, C.E.; Freeborough, E. (1896). Chess Openings, Ancient and Modern.
- Ravikumar, V (1992). Play the Benko Gambit. Cadogan. ISBN 978-1-85744-014-0.
- Ree, Hans (2000). The Human Comedy of Chess. Access Publishers Network.
- Raphael, Michael W. (2010). ReViewing Chess.

=== Reinfeld, Fred ===
- Reinfeld, Fred (1936). Colle's Chess Masterpieces. Black Knight Press. ISBN 0-486-24757-0. (1984 Dover Publications edition).
- Reinfeld, Fred (1941). Keres' Best Games of Chess 1931–1940.
- Reinfeld, Fred (1947). Reinfeld on the End-game in Chess. Dover Publications.
- Reinfeld, Fred (1948). Hypermodern Chess: As Developed in the Games of its Greatest Exponent Aron Nimzovich. Dover Publications. ISBN 0-486-20448-0.
- Reinfeld, Fred (1953). The Complete Chess Course. Doubleday.
- Reinfeld, Fred; Horowitz, Israel A. (1954). Chess Traps, Pitfalls, and Swindles. Simon and Schuster. ISBN 0-671-21041-6.
- Reinfeld, Fred (1954). How To Be A Winner At Chess. Fawcett. ISBN 0-449-91206-X.
- Reinfeld, Fred; Soltis, Andrew (1974). Morphy Chess Masterpieces. Collier Books.
- Reinfeld, Fred (1974). The Immortal Capablanca. Dover. ISBN 0-02-029690-8.

- Reitstein, Leonard R. (2003). A History of Chess in Southern Africa. Thorold's Africana Books. ISBN 978-0-620-29829-2.
- Renaud, Georges; Kahn, Victor (1962). The Art of the Checkmate. Dover Publications. ISBN 0-486-20106-6.
- Reshevsky, Samuel (1976). Great Chess Upsets. Arco. ISBN 978-0-668-03493-7.
- Reshevsky, Samuel (2002) [1976]. The Art of Positional Play. McKay. ISBN 978-0-8129-3475-5.
- Réti, Richard (1923). Modern Ideas in Chess. Hardinge Simpole. ISBN 1-84382-015-3.
- Réti, Richard (1976). Masters of the Chessboard. Dover Publications. ISBN 0-486-23384-7.
- Retschitzki, Jean; Gobet, Fernand; de Voogt, Alex (2004). Moves in mind: The psychology of board games. Psychology Press. ISBN 1-84169-336-7.
- Reuben, Stewart (1992). Chess Openings — Your Choice!. Cadogan Chess. ISBN 1-85744-070-6.
- Ribli, Zoltan; Kallai, Gabor (1987). Winning With the Queen's Indian. Simon & Schuster. ISBN 978-0-02-029801-4.
- Ribli, Zoltan; Kallai, Gabor (1993). Winning With the English. Henry Holt. ISBN 978-0-8050-2642-9.
- Rice, John; Lipton, Michael; Matthews, Robert Charles Oliver (1963). Chess Problems: Introduction to an Art. Faber & Faber.
- Rice, John (1996). Chess Wizardry: The New ABC of Chess Problems. Batsford / International Chess Enterprises. ISBN 1-879479-33-8.
- Ristoja, Aulikki; Ristoja, Thomas (1995). Perusteet. Shakki (in Finnish). WSOY. ISBN 951-0-20505-2.
- Ristoja, Thomas; Ristoja, Aulikki (1995). Perusteet. Shakki (in Finnish). WSOY. ISBN 951-0-20505-2.

=== Rizzitano, James ===
- Rizzitano, James (2004). Understanding Your Chess. Gambit Publications. ISBN 978-1-904600-07-7.
- Rizzitano, James (2005). How to Beat 1.d4. Gambit Publications. ISBN 978-1-904600-33-6.
- Rizzitano, James (2006). Chess Explained: The Taimanov Sicilian. Gambit Publications. ISBN 978-1-904600-62-6.
- Rizzitano, James (2007). La Sicilienne Taimanov Expliquée (in French). Olibris. ISBN 978-1-904600-62-6.
- Rizzitano, James (2007). Chess Explained: The Queen's Gambit Declined. Gambit Publications. ISBN 978-2-916340-15-9.
- Rizzitano, James (2008). Le Gambit Dame Refusé Expliqué (in French). Olibris. ISBN 978-2-916340-29-6.
- Rizzitano, James (2010). Play the Najdorf Sicilian. Gambit Publications. ISBN 978-1-906454-16-6.
- Rizzitano, James (2010). La Sicilienne Najdorf Expliquée (in French). Olibris. ISBN 978-2-916340-49-4.
- Rizzitano, James (2021). Modern Chess Opening Repertoire for White. Gambit Publications. ISBN 978-1-911465-74-4.
- Rizzitano, James (2023). Un répertoire d'ouvertures moderne pour les Blancs (in French). Olibris. ISBN 979-10-97140-35-9.
- Rizzitano, James (2024). 1001 Deadly Chess Puzzles. Gambit Publications. ISBN 978-1-80504-057-6.

- Rogers, Ian (1981). Australian Chess - Into the Eighties. Sun Books. ISBN 0-7251-0384-1.
- Rogers, Ian; Rogers, Cathy (Photographer) (1996). Australia at the Yerevan Chess Olympiad. Australian Chess Enterprises.
- Rogozenko, Dorian (2003). Anti-Sicilians A Guide for Black. Gambit Publications. ISBN 1-901983-84-6.
- Rogozenko, Dorian (2005). Sveshnikov Reloaded. Quality Chess. ISBN 91-975243-5-2.
- Rohde, Michael (1997). The Great Evans Gambit Debate. Thinkers' Press. ISBN 0-938650-75-0.
- Romero, Alfonso (2003). Creative Chess Strategy. Gambit. ISBN 1-901983-92-7.
- Rosen, Bernd (2003). Chess Endgame Training. Gambit Publications. ISBN 978-1-904600-01-5.
- Rosino, Antonio; Chicco, Adriano (1990). Storia degli scacchi in Italia (in Italian). Marsilio. ISBN 88-317-5383-5.
- Rotella, Tony (2014). The Killer Sicilian. Everyman Chess. ISBN 978-1-85744-665-4.
- Rowson, Jonathan (1999). Understanding the Grünfeld. Gambit Publications. ISBN 1-901983-09-9.
- Rowson, Jonathan (2000). The Seven Deadly Chess Sins. Gambit Publications. ISBN 1-901983-36-6.
- Rowson, Jonathan (2005). Chess for Zebras: Thinking Differently About Black and White. Gambit Publications. ISBN 1-901983-85-4.
- Roycroft, John (1972). Test Tube Chess. Faber and Faber. ISBN 0-571-09573-9.
- Rozentalis, Eduardas; Harley, Andrew (2002). Play the 2.c3 Sicilian. Gambit. ISBN 1-901983-56-0.
- Rozman, Levy (2023). How to Win at Chess: The Ultimate Guide for Beginners and Beyond. Ten Speed Press. ISBN 978-1984862075.

== S ==
- Saidy, Anthony (1975). The Battle of Chess Ideas. RHM Press. ISBN 0-89058-018-9.
- Saidy, Anthony; Lessing, Norman (1974). The World of Chess. Random House. ISBN 0-394-48777-X.
- Sakaev, Konstantin; Semkov, Semko (2005). The Queen's Gambit Accepted. Chess Stars. ISBN 954-8782-33-2.
- Sakaev, Konstantin (2006). An Expert's Guide to the 7.Bc4 Gruenfeld. Chess Stars. ISBN 978-954-8782-48-7.
- Sammalvuo, Tapani (2004). The English Attack. Gambit Publications. ISBN 1-901983-57-9.
- Sanakoev, Grigory (1998). World Champion at the Third Attempt. Gambit Publications. ISBN 1-901983-11-0.
- Sárközy, Balázs; Portisch, Lajos (1981). Six Hundred Endings. Pergamon Press. ISBN 0-08-024137-9.
- Sawyer, Tim (1992). Blackmar-Diemer Gambit Keybook. Thinkers' Press.
- Sayen, Henry W. (1876). The Grand International Centennial Chess Congress, held in Philadelphia in August, 1876.
- Schafroth, Colleen (2002). The Art of Chess. Harry N. Abrams. ISBN 0-8109-1001-2.
- Schandorff, Lars (2009). Playing the Queen's Gambit: A Grandmaster Guide. Quality Chess. ISBN 978-1-906552-18-3.
- Schandorff, Lars (2012). Playing 1.d4–The Indian Defences. Glasgow: Quality Chess. ISBN 978-1-907982-17-0.
- Scheerer, Christoph (2008). The Greatest Ever Chess Opening Ideas. Everyman Chess. ISBN 978-1-85744-561-9.
- Scheerer, Christoph (2011). The Blackmar-Diemer Gambit. Everyman Chess. ISBN 978-1-85744-598-5.

=== Schiller, Eric ===
- Schiller, Eric (1984). Cambridge Springs Defense. Thinkers Pr Inc / Chessco. ISBN 0-931462-32-0.
- Schiller, Eric; Alburt, Lev (1985). The Alekhine for the Tournament Player. American Chess Promotions. ISBN 0-7134-1596-7.
- Schiller, Eric (1986). Blackmar Diemer Gambit. Thinkers Pr Inc / Chessco. ISBN 0-931462-52-5.
- Schiller, Eric; Shamkovich, Leonid (1988). Saving Lost Positions. Macmillan Chess Library. ISBN 0-02-053770-0.
- Schiller, Eric (1989). How To Play The Kings Indian Attack. Chess Enterprises. ISBN 0-931462-95-9.
- Schiller, Eric (1989). Who's Afraid of the King's Gambit Accepted?. Thinkers Pr Inc / Chessco. ISBN 978-0-931462-90-0.
- Schiller, Eric; Watson, John (1995). The Big Book of Busts. Hypermodern Press. ISBN 1-886040-13-3.
- Schiller, Eric (1998). Standard Chess Openings. Cardoza. ISBN 0-940685-72-8.
- Schiller, Eric (1999). Encyclopedia of Chess Wisdom. Cardoza. ISBN 0-940685-93-0.
- Schiller, Eric (2002). Unorthodox Chess Openings. Cardoza. ISBN 1-58042-072-9.
- Schiller, Eric (2002). Gambit Chess Openings. Simon & Schuster. ISBN 978-1-58042-038-9.
- Schiller, Eric (2003). Official Rules of Chess (2nd ed.). Cardoza Publishing. ISBN 978-1-58042-092-1.

- Schlechter, Carl; von Bilguer, Paul Rudolf; von Heydebrand und der Lasa, Tassilo (1916). Handbuch des Schachspiels (in German). Walter de Gruyter.
- Schonberg, Harold C. (1973). Grandmasters of Chess. Lippincott. ISBN 978-0-397-01004-2.
- Sénéchaud, Dany (1997). Emil Diemer (1908–1990), missionnaire des échecs acrobatiques (in French). ASIN B000X715FY.

=== Seirawan, Yasser ===
- Seirawan, Yasser; Minev, Nikolay (1991). Take My Rooks. International Chess Enterprises. ISBN 1-879479-01-X.
- Seirawan, Yasser; Stefanovic, George (1992). No Regrets:Fischer-Spassky 1992. International Chess Enterprises. ISBN 1-879479-09-5.
- Seirawan, Yasser (2003). Play Winning Chess. Everyman Chess. ISBN 1-85744-331-4.
- Seirawan, Yasser (2003). Winning Chess Endings. Everyman Chess. ISBN 1-85744-348-9.
- Seirawan, Yasser (2003). Winning Chess Openings. Everyman Chess. ISBN 1-85744-349-7.
- Seirawan, Yasser (2005). Winning Chess Strategies. Everyman Chess. ISBN 1-85744-385-3.
- Seirawan, Yasser (2005). Winning Chess Tactics. Everyman Chess. ISBN 1-85744-385-3.
- Seirawan, Yasser (2010). Chess Duels: My Games with the World Champions. Everyman Chess. ISBN 978-1-85744-587-9.

=== Sergeant, Philip Walsingham ===
- Sergeant, Philip Walsingham (1934). A Century of British Chess.
- Sergeant, Philip Walsingham (1938). Championship Chess. Dover Publications. ISBN 0-486-21012-X.
- Sergeant, Philip Walsingham (1919). Charousek's Games of Chess. G. Bell and Sons. ISBN 0-486-25832-7.
- Sergeant, Philip Walsingham; Goldstein, Maurice Edward; Griffith, Richard; White, John Herbert (1925). Modern Chess Openings (4th ed.). Whitehead & Miller.
- Sergeant, Philip Walsingham; Goldstein, Maurice Edward; Griffith, Richard; White, John Herbert (1932). Modern Chess Openings (5th ed.). Whitehead & Miller.
- Sergeant, Philip Walsingham; Fine, Reuben; Griffith, Richard; White, John Herbert (1939). Modern Chess Openings (6th ed.). Whitehead & Miller.
- Sergeant, Philip Walsingham; Griffith, Richard; Korn, Walter; White, John Herbert (1946). Modern Chess Openings (7th ed.). Sir Isaac Pitman & Sons.
- Sergeant, Philip Walsingham (1932). Morphy Gleanings. David McKay. ISBN 0-486-22952-1. (The Unknown Morphy, Dover, 1973).
- Sergeant, Philip Walsingham (1916). Morphy's Games of Chess. G. Bell and Sons. ISBN 0-486-20386-7.
- Sergeant, Philip Walsingham; W. H. Watts (1922). Pillsbury's Chess Career. American Chess Bulletin. ISBN 0-486-21543-1.

- Shahade, Jennifer (2005). Chess Bitch: Women in the Ultimate Intellectual Sport. Siles Press. ISBN 1-890085-09-X.
- Shahade, Jennifer (2011). Play Like a Girl!. Mongoose Press. ISBN 978-1-936277-03-2.
- Shakarov, Aleksander; Kasparov, Garry (1984). Caro-Kann : Classical 4.Bf5. Batsford. ISBN 0-7134-4237-9.
- Shamkovich, Leonid (1978). The Modern Chess Sacrifice. Tartan Books. ISBN 0-679-14103-0.
- Shamkovich, Leonid; Schiller, Eric (1988). Saving Lost Positions. Macmillan Chess Library. ISBN 0-02-053770-0.
- Shaw, John (2002). Starting out: the Queens Gambit. Everyman Chess. ISBN 1-85744-304-7.
- Shaw, John (2003). Starting Out: The Ruy Lopez. Everyman Chess. ISBN 1-85744-321-7.
- Shenk, David (2006). The Immortal Game: A History of Chess. Doubleday. ISBN 0-385-51010-1.
- Shereshevsky, Mikhail (1994). Endgame Strategy. Everyman Chess. ISBN 1-85744-063-3.
- Shereshevsky, Mikhail (2002). The Soviet Chess Conveyor. CyberRead. ISBN 978-1-931921-22-0.
- Sherman, Laura; Kilpatrick, Bill (2012). Chess Is Child's Play: Teaching Techniques That Work. Mongoose Press. ISBN 978-1-936277-31-5.
- Shibut, Macon (2004). Paul Morphy and the Evolution of Chess Theory. Dover. ISBN 0-486-43574-1.
- Shipov, Sergey (2009). The Complete Hedgehog, Vol. 1. Mongoose Press. ISBN 978-0-9791482-1-7.
- Shirov, Alexei (1995). Fire on Board: Shirov's Best Games. Everyman Chess. ISBN 1-85744-150-8.
- Shirov, Alexei (2005). Fire on Board, Part 2: 1997-2004. Everyman Chess. ISBN 1-85744-382-9.

=== Silman, Jeremy ===
- Silman, Jeremy (1990). Dynamic Karo Kann. Summit Pub. ISBN 978-0-945806-02-8.
- Silman, Jeremy; Donaldson, John W. (1993). Accelerated Dragons. Everyman Chess. ISBN 1-85744-208-3.
- Silman, Jeremy (1998). The Complete Book of Chess Strategy. Silman-James Press. ISBN 1-890085-01-4.
- Silman, Jeremy (1999). The Amateur's Mind: Turning Chess Misconceptions into Chess Mastery. Siles Press. ISBN 9781890085025.
- Silman, Jeremy (2007). Silman's Complete Endgame Course: From Beginner to Master. Siles Press. ISBN 978-1-890085-10-0.
- Silman, Jeremy (2010). How to Reassess Your Chess (4th ed.). Siles Press. ISBN 978-1-890085-13-1.

- Silverman, Robert J.; Hankins, Thomas Leroy (1995). Instruments and the Imagination. Princeton University Press. ISBN 0-691-02997-0.
- Smith, Ken; Evans, Larry (1973). Chess World Championship 1972: Fischer vs. Spassky. Simon & Schuster. ISBN 0-671-21546-9.
- Smith, Robin (2004). Modern Chess Analysis. Gambit Publications. ISBN 1-904600-08-5.
- Smullyan, Raymond M. (1985). The Chess Mysteries of Sherlock Holmes. Alfred A. Knopf (1985 ed.); Random House Puzzles & Games (1994 ed.). ISBN 978-0-8129-2389-6.
- Smullyan, Raymond M. (1981). The Chess Mysteries of the Arabian Knights. Alfred A. Knopf. ISBN 978-0-394-74869-6.
- Smyslov, Vasily; Levenfish, Grigory (1971). Rook endings. Batsford. ISBN 0-7134-0449-3.
- Smyslov, Vasily (1997). Vasily Smyslov: Endgame Virtuoso. Everyman Chess. ISBN 1-85744-198-2.
- Snape, Ian (2003). Chess Endings Made Simple: How to Approach the Endgame with Confidence. Gambit Publications. ISBN 1-901983-97-8.
- Sokolov, Ivan (2009). Winning Chess Middlegames. New In Chess. ISBN 978-90-5691-264-2.
- Sokolov, Ivan (2009). The Ruy Lopez Revisited. New In Chess. ISBN 978-90-5691-297-0.
- Soloviov, Sergei (2004). Bogoljubow, the Fate of a Chess Player. Chess Stars. ISBN 978-954-8782-38-8.

=== Soltis, Andrew ===
- Soltis, Andrew; Reinfeld, Fred (1974). Morphy Chess Masterpieces. Collier Books.
- Soltis, Andrew (1975). The Art of Defense in Chess. David McKay. ISBN 0-679-13043-8.
- Soltis, Andrew (1975). The Great Chess Tournaments and Their Stories. Chilton Book. ISBN 0-8019-6138-6.
- Soltis, Andrew (1979). Catalog of Chess Mistakes. McKay. ISBN 978-0-679-14151-8.
- Soltis, Andrew (1981). Queen's Indian Defense. R.H.M. Press. ISBN 978-0-89058-051-6.
- Soltis, Andrew; McCormick, Gene (1986). The U.S. Chess Championship, 1845–1985. McFarland. ISBN 0-89950-056-0.
- Soltis, Andrew (1993). Baltic Defense to the Queens Gambit. Chess Digest. ISBN 978-0-87568-228-0.
- Soltis, Andrew (1993). Beating the Pirc/Modern with the Fianchetto Variation. Chess Digest. ISBN 978-0-87568-220-4.
- Soltis, Andrew (1994). Frank Marshall, United States Chess Champion. McFarland. ISBN 978-0-89950-887-0.
- Soltis, Andrew (1995). Pawn Structure Chess. McKay. ISBN 0-8129-2529-7.
- Soltis, Andrew (1997). Grandmaster Secrets: Endings. Thinker's Press. ISBN 0-938650-66-1.
- Soltis, Andrew; McCormick, Gene (1997). The U.S. Chess Championship, 1845–1996. McFarland. ISBN 0-7864-0248-2.
- Soltis, Andrew (1998). Colle System, Koltanowski Variation 5.c3. Chess Digest. ISBN 978-0-87568-286-0.
- Soltis, Andrew (1999). Soviet Chess 1917–1991. McFarland. ISBN 0-7864-0676-3.
- Soltis, Andrew (2000). Grandmaster Secrets: Openings. Thinker's Press. ISBN 0-938650-68-8.
- Soltis, Andrew (2002). Chess Lists. McFarland. ISBN 978-0-7864-1296-9.
- Soltis, Andrew (2003). Bobby Fischer Rediscovered. Batsford. ISBN 0-7134-8846-8.
- Soltis, Andrew (2004). Rethinking the Chess Pieces. Batsford. ISBN 0-7134-8904-9.
- Soltis, Andrew (2007). Transpo Tricks in Chess. Batsford. ISBN 978-0-7134-9051-0.
- Soltis, Andrew (2008). The Wisest Things Ever Said About Chess. Batsford. ISBN 978-1-906388-00-3.
- Soltis, Andrew (2010). Studying Chess Made Easy. Batsford. ISBN 978-1-906388-67-6.

- Sosonko, Genna (2003). Russian Silhouettes. New in Chess. ISBN 90-5691-078-7.
- Sosonko, Genna (2003). The Reliable Past. New in Chess. ISBN 90-5691-114-7.
- Sosonko, Genna (2006). Smart Chip from St. Petersburg: And Other Tales of a Bygone Chess Era. New in Chess. ISBN 90-5691-169-4.
- Speelman, Jon (1981). Analysing the Endgame. Arco Chess Library. ISBN 0-668-05242-2.
- Speelman, Jon (1981). Endgame Preparation. Batsford. ISBN 0-7134-4000-7.
- Speelman, Jon; Tisdall, Jonathan; Wade, Robert (1993). Batsford Chess Endings. Batsford. ISBN 0-7134-4420-7.
- Spielmann, Rudolf (1951). The Art of the Sacrifice in Chess. David McKay.
- Spracklen, Dan; Spracklen, Kathe (1978). Sargon: A Computer Chess Program. Hayden Book Company. ISBN 0-8104-5155-7.
- Spracklen, Kathe; Spracklen, Dan (1978). Sargon: A Computer Chess Program. Hayden Book Company. ISBN 0-8104-5155-7.
- Staker, Josef (1982). The Budapest Defence. Chess Digest. ASIN B000KXI9BY.
- Standage, Tom (2002). The Turk: The Life and Times of the Famous Eighteenth-Century Chess-Playing Machine. Walker. ISBN 0-8027-1391-2.
- Staunton, Howard (1849). The Chess-Player's Companion. Henry G. Bohn.
- Staunton, Howard (1847). The Chess-Player's Handbook.
- Staunton, Howard (1870). The Blue Book of Chess Teaching the Rudiments of the Game, and Giving an Analysis of All the Recognized Openings. Porter & Coates.
- Stean, Michael (1976). Sicilian, Najdorf. Batsford. ISBN 0-7134-0098-6.
- Stean, Michael (2003). Simple Chess. Dover Publications. ISBN 978-0-486-42420-0.
- Stefanovic, George; Seirawan, Yasser (1992). No Regrets:Fischer-Spassky 1992. International Chess Enterprises. ISBN 1-879479-09-5.
- Steiner, George (1973). The Sporting Scene: White Knights of Reykjavik. Faber & Faber. ISBN 0-571-10362-6.
- Steinitz, Wilhelm (1889). The Modern Chess Instructor. G.P. Putnam's Sons.
- Steinitz, Wilhelm (1891). The book of the Sixth American Chess Congress.
- Stevens, Arthur M. (1969). The Blue Book of Charts to Winning Chess. A. S. Barnes and Co.
- Stormson, Markus (2014). Curried Chess. Troubadour Publishing. ISBN 978-1783065-974.
- Suba, Mihai (1991). Dynamic Chess Strategy. Pergamon Chess. ISBN 0-08-037141-8.

=== Suetin, Alexey ===
- Suetin, Alexey (1976). A Contemporary Approach to the Middle Game. Hippocrene Books. ISBN 978-0-7134-3123-0.
- Suetin, Alexey; Neat, Ken (1988). Plan Like a Grandmaster. Batsford. ISBN 978-0-7134-5830-5.
- Suetin, Alexey (1991). The Complete Grünfeld. Batsford.
- Suetin, Alexey (1992). The Complete Grunfeld. Henry Holt. ISBN 978-0-8050-2318-3.
- Suetin, Alexey (1997). Three Steps to Chess Mastery. Cadogan Books. ISBN 978-1-85744-109-3.
- Suetin, Alexey (2010). Soviet Chess Strategy. Quality Chess. ISBN 978-1-906552-20-6.

- Summerscale, Aaron (1999). A Killer Chess Opening Repertoire. Globe Pequot. ISBN 978-1-85744-519-0.
- Summerscale, Aaron; Summerscale, Claire (2002). Interview With a Grandmaster. Everyman Chess. ISBN 978-1-85744-243-4.
- Sunnucks, Anne (1970). The Encyclopaedia of Chess. St. Martin's Press. LCCN 78106371.
- Swift, A.J.; Gillam, Anthony J. (2001). 1st European championship Munich 1942. The Chess Player. ISBN 1-901034-46-1.

== See also ==
- List of chess books (A–F)
- List of chess books (G–L)
- List of chess books (T–Z)
- Chess endgame literature
