= 1970 in chess =

Events in chess in 1970;

== Top players ==
FIDE top 10 by Elo rating - 1970

1. Bobby Fischer United States 2720
2. Boris Spassky Soviet Union 2670
3. Viktor Korchnoi Soviet Union 2670
4. Efim Geller Soviet Union 2660
5. Bent Larsen Denmark 2650
6. Tigran Petrosian Soviet Union 2650
7. Mikhail Botvinnik Soviet Union 2640
8. Lev Polugaevsky Soviet Union 2640
9. Lajos Portisch Hungary 2630
10. Vasily Smyslov Soviet Union 2620

== Chess news in brief ==
- A much publicised team event, described as 'The Match of the Century', comprises a four-round, ten-board contest played between teams of the USSR and the Rest of the World. The encounter, held at the Trades Union House in Belgrade, is the brainchild of Max Euwe and captures the interest of the world media, due to the attendance of the world's elite grandmasters and because of the symbolism with Cold War politics. Two thousand spectators make up the audience. Bobby Fischer is chosen (by virtue of his Elo rating) to play board one for the Rest of the World team, but surprisingly agrees to step down to board two when Bent Larsen argues that recent performances should put him first and refuses to give way. The match is won by the USSR, by the narrowest of margins (20½-19½) and many commentators are surprised that the USSR's remarkable strength in depth (four of the five last boards are ex-world champions) does not lead to a more comprehensive victory. Larsen scores a creditable 2½-1½ win against Boris Spassky, while Fischer comfortably defeats Tigran Petrosian 3-1.
- Fischer is triumphant at the Palma de Mallorca Interzonal, scoring 18½/23, well ahead of Larsen, Efim Geller, Robert Hübner (all 15/23), Mark Taimanov and Wolfgang Uhlmann (both 14/23).
- Fischer enjoys another 3½ point winning margin at Buenos Aires, where he scores 15/17, ahead of Vladimir Tukmakov (11½/17) and Oscar Panno (11/17).
- Larsen wins the Lugano tournament, with 9½/14, ahead of Fridrik Olafsson (8½/14), Wolfgang Unzicker and Svetozar Gligorić (both 7½/14).
- Fischer wins at Rovinj/Zagreb with 13/17, ahead of Vlastimil Hort, Vasily Smyslov, Svetozar Gligorić and Viktor Korchnoi, each with 11/17. Former World Champion, Tigran Petrosian scores 10½/17.
- Spassky is the winner of Leiden's four-player event. Jan Hein Donner, Mikhail Botvinnik and Bent Larsen also compete.
- The Siegen Olympiad plays host to sixty teams and three hundred and sixty players. The USSR are overall gold medal winners with 27½/44, making it their tenth successive win, ahead of Hungary (26½/44) and Yugoslavia (26/44). Spassky makes the top board best score (individual gold, 79.2%), ahead of Fischer (silver, 76.9%) and then Larsen (bronze, 76.5% - from the B Final). There are record numbers of spectators, especially on the day of the Fischer - Spassky encounter, which is won by Spassky. Following a poor performance in the preliminaries, England are surprisingly relegated to the C Final, which they win and from where William Hartston takes the board three gold medal (78.1%). Other individual gold medals include those awarded to Borislav Ivkov (board two) and Aleksandar Matanovic (board four). Harry de Graaf officiates.
- FIDE formally adopts the Elo rating system and publishes its first official list, a revised version of the provisional 1969 list, taking more recent game result data into account. The top 10 is as listed above.
- Kapfenberg hosts the final stage of the European Team Chess Championship. From the eight qualifiers, USSR take gold with 52½/70, from Hungary (41/70) and East Germany (39½/70). Played over ten boards (with reserves), the Soviet Union's result is emphatic, even though they leave out Spassky and Botvinnik. Paul Keres scores 5/5 on board eight. Prizes are awarded to players scoring the best result on each board. Harry Golombek is the controller.
- Taimanov is a comfortable winner in Beverwijk, at the annual Hoogoven tournament, with 12/15. He finishes ahead of Hort (10½/15) and Ivkov (10/15).
- Korchnoi wins the 38th Soviet Championship with 16/21, ahead of Tukmakov (14½/21) and Leonid Stein (14/21). Solid progress continues to be made by last year's World Junior Champion, Anatoly Karpov, as he scores 12/21.
- Larsen wins the US Open Chess Championship in Boston. Over three hundred players compete.
- Yugoslavia's bright new prospect Ljubomir Ljubojević, shares first place at Sarajevo with Bruno Parma (both 10/15), ahead of Vladimir Antoshin and Georgi Tringov (both 9½/15).
- Keres wins at Budapest with 10/15, ahead of László Szabó (9/15) and Borislav Ivkov (8½/15).
- Evgeny Vasiukov and Mark Taimanov share victory at Skopje with 11/15. Following are Florin Gheorghiu (10/15) and Dražen Marović (9/15).
- Mikhail Botvinnik announces his retirement from competitive chess, in order to devote more time to his chess school activities and a developing interest in chess-playing computer programs.
- FIDE President Folke Rogard retires and is replaced by former World Champion, Max Euwe. His appointment appears to be a universally popular choice.
- The Soviet spacestation Soyuz 9 hosts the first game of chess in space, when the Cosmonauts play against the ground support staff. The game takes six hours to complete (as communication is only possible for a short time during each orbit) and is drawn after 35 moves of a Queen's Gambit Accepted.

== Births ==
- Xie Jun, Chinese GM and former Women's World Champion - October 30
- Boris Alterman, Soviet-Israeli GM, a highly rated tournament player of the 1990s - May 4
- Rune Djurhuus, Norwegian GM and former European Junior Champion - January 25
- Zbyněk Hráček, Czechoslovak GM, a former winner of the national championship - September 9
- Alisa Marić, Serbian WGM and IM, former Women's World Championship Candidate - January 10
- Mirjana Marić, Serbian WGM, former women's national and World Youth Champion - January 10
- Gilberto Hernández Guerrero, Mexican GM, for many years the country's strongest player - February 4
- Tiger Hillarp Persson, Swedish GM and former national champion - October 28
- Manuel Apicella, French GM and former national champion - April 19
- Zoltán Varga, Hungarian GM and former national champion - July 12
- Karsten Muller, German GM, a writer for Chessbase and noted expert on endgames - November 23
- Alberto David, Luxembourg GM, for many years the country's strongest player - March 26
- Yona Kosashvili, Georgian born GM who has also lived in Israel and Canada - July 3
- Lin Weiguo, Chinese IM and 3 times the national champion - July 25

== Deaths ==
- Vincenzo Castaldi, Italian IM, many times the national champion - January 6
- Mariano Castillo, Chilean Master and multiple winner of the national championship - September 23
- Abraham Kupchik, U.S. Master and Olympiad medal winner - November 26
- Ludwig Rodl, German Master and Olympiad medal winner - March 23
- Adolf Seitz, German-Argentine Master mostly active in the 1920s and 1930s - April 6
- Alois Wotawa, Austrian composer of chess problems and endgame studies - April 12
- Wilhelm Schönmann, German Master, active in the early part of the 20th century - May 15

== Miscellaneous ==
- 1970 Dubrovnik chess set was created for the 19th Chess Olympiad.
