= Neil McDonald =

Neil McDonald may refer to:

- Neil McDonald (chess player) (born 1967), English chess grandmaster
- Neil McDonald (footballer) (born 1965), English association footballer
- Neil McDonald (born 1922), Australian rear admiral, Deputy Chief of Navy 1978–1979

== See also ==
- Neil Macdonald (born 1957), Canadian journalist
- Neil C. Macdonald, American educator
- Neal McDonald (born 1963), British sailor
