= Philidor position (disambiguation) =

The Philidor position is an endgame position in chess where one side with only a rook defends against an opponent with a rook and a pawn.

Philidor position may also refer to:

- a rook and bishop versus rook endgame position
- a queen versus rook endgame position
- Philidor's mate, a checkmating pattern that ends in smothered mate

== See also ==
- François-André Danican Philidor
