= Hanon Russell =

Hanon W. Russell is a lawyer, chess expert, chess book author, translator, online chess magazine publisher and chess book store operator. He maintains his office in Milford, Connecticut.

Mr. Russell has been translating Russian chess literature for four decades, has had in the past a master's rating, collects chess memorabilia, and practiced law in Connecticut. Russell first became known during the Soviet era for translating Russian-language documents into English. He enjoyed exceptional access to Soviet materials.

Hanon Russell has been involved for many years with the United States Chess Federation. He is the former publisher ChessCafe.com, a weekly chess publication online.

== Books ==
- Russian for Chess Players ISBN 0-938650-44-0
- A Chessplayer's Guide to Russian
- Correspondence Chess by Hanon W. Russell, Thinker's Press, 1980
