= Dan Heisman =

American chess player (born 1950)

Personal information
- Born: July 8, 1950 (age 76)

Chess career
- Country: United States
- Title: National Master
- Peak rating: 2285 (July 1990)

Dan Heisman (born July 8, 1950) is a United States Chess Federation National Master, author and instructor.

== Education ==
Heisman graduated from Hatboro-Horsham High School in Pennsylvania as the co-valedictorian in 1968, and was elected to the school's hall of fame in 2007. He attended Caltech and transferred to Penn State in 1969. In 1971 Heisman graduated at the top of his class earning a B.S. in mathematics, and in 1983, again at the top of his class with a 4.0 G.P.A., received his master's degree in engineering, both from the Pennsylvania State University.

== Early career ==
Heisman began his career as an engineer and worked in that capacity with several organizations, including the Naval Air Development Center and Intermetrics, Inc. Later, Heisman became a Registered Investment Adviser in Pennsylvania. He has been a full-time chess instructor and author since 1996.

== Chess career ==
Heisman is the two-time open chess champion of Philadelphia (1973 and 1976), and the Philadelphia Invitational Chess Champion (1973). His Penn State team won the U.S. Amateur Team Championship in 1972. He is rated over 2200 by both the United States Chess Federation and FIDE, but is currently inactive as a tournament player. Heisman is a member of the International Computer Games Association and worked at both Deep Blue versus Garry Kasparov matches (1996 and 1997).

Heisman authors the award-winning Novice Nook column, aimed at improving adults, for the popular Chess Cafe Web site. He has also written ten books on chess, including Elements of Positional Chess Evaluation, Everyone's 2nd Chess Book, and Looking for Trouble. His most recent book, Is Your Move Safe, won the Chess Journalists of America's 2016 Best Instructional Book.

Heisman is well known throughout the Philadelphia chess scene. His chess activities include promoting local chess, hosting a chess radio show "Ask the Renaissance Man" on ICC Webcast, and organizing events like the Philadelphia Championship and Philadelphia Junior Championship. He is currently a member of the Main Line Chess Club and the SE Scholastic Coordinator for the Pennsylvania State Chess Federation. He maintains an extensive web page which provides information on Philadelphia area chess and many articles on chess improvement. Heisman is a chess tutor and has taught radio DJ Howard Stern. He helped mentor the 2007-08 National High School champion Dan Yeager, who attended his old high school (Hatboro-Horsham High School).

== Personal life ==
Heisman is related to John Heisman, the football coach who left the endowment for the Heisman Trophy. Dan Heisman's paternal great-grandfather, Aaron, was John Heisman's first cousin.

Heisman is married to Shelly Hahn. His first wife, Susan "Holly" Hollis Bloom Heisman, died of breast cancer in 1994; they had one son, Delen, a graduate of Carnegie Mellon University. Heisman was born in Willow Grove, Pennsylvania in 1950 and currently lives in Wynnewood, Pennsylvania.

He is a member of the Society for American Baseball Research and had a baseball newsletter, "Baseball's Active Leaders". His hobbies include backgammon, science fiction, collecting comic books, and following the Philadelphia sports teams.

== Books ==
- Heisman, Dan (2016). Is Your Move Safe?. Mongoose Press. ISBN 978-1936277711.
- Heisman, Dan (2013). Looking for Trouble (2nd ed.). Russell Enterprises. ISBN 978-1-936490-85-1.
- Heisman, Dan (2012). The World's Most Instructive Amateur Game Book. Mongoose Press. ISBN 978-1-9362774-38.
- Heisman, Dan (2011). Back to Basics: Tactics. Russell Enterprises. ISBN 978-1-888690-34-7.
- Heisman, Dan (2010). Elements of Positional Evaluation (4th ed.). Russell Enterprises. ISBN 978-1-888690-58-3.
- Heisman, Dan (2010). A Guide To Chess Improvement: The Best of Novice Nook. Everyman Chess. ISBN 978-1-85744-649-4.
- Heisman, Dan (2010). The Improving Annotator. Mongoose Press. ISBN 978-1-9362770-4-9.
- Heisman, Dan (2009). The Improving Chess Thinker. Mongoose Press. ISBN 978-0-9791482-4-8.
- Heisman, Dan (2005). Everyone's 2nd Chess Book (2nd ed.). Thinkers' Press. ISBN 978-1-888710-26-7.
- Heisman, Dan (2002). A Parent's Guide to Chess (2nd ed.). Russell Enterprises. ISBN 978-1888690125.
