= ChessCafe.com =

Chess website

ChessCafe.com is a website that publishes endgame studies, book reviews and other articles related to chess on a weekly basis. It was founded in 1996 by Hanon Russell, and is well known as a repository of articles about chess and its history.

It contains about twenty columns, each of which appears monthly. They are staggered so that about five new columns appear each Wednesday. The authors include some well-known chess players and instructors, such as Yasser Seirawan, Dan Heisman, Mark Dvoretsky, Susan Polgar, Karsten Müller, and Tim Harding. Previous notable contributors include Tony Miles, Tim Krabbe, Hans Ree, and Lev Alburt.

Harding's column, "The Kibitzer", often reviews games from the 19th and early 20th centuries, and produces original analysis based on his experience playing and annotating correspondence chess. "The Kibitzer" is also the oldest running column on Chesscafe.com, having started in June 1996.

ChessCafe.com was previously linked with the United States Chess Federation and operated USCF Sales until April 2009. The website also maintains archives in PDF format of all its articles from 2000 and later, and text archives of articles from previous issues. It suspended publication of new columns in May 2015. In June 2015 The site announced that the number of subscribers was too low to sustain the site and that they would go on a three-month hiatus. The last puzzle was published in 2016 and the site is now dormant.

Old articles are behind a paywall.

== Publishing ==
A number of books have been published under the ChessCafe brand by Russell Enterprises:

- Müller, Karsten (2004), ChessCafe Puzzle Book, Russell Enterprises, ISBN 1-88869-021-6
- Müller, Karsten (2010), ChessCafe Puzzle Book 3, Russell Enterprises, ISBN 978-1-88869-066-8
- Heisman, Dan (2007), Back to Basics: Tactics (ChessCafe Back to Basics Chess), Russell Enterprises, ISBN 978-1-88869-034-7
- Francuski, Branislav (2008), Back to Basics: Fundamentals (ChessCafe Back to Basics Chess), Russell Enterprises, ISBN 978-1-88869-042-2
- Hansen, Carsten (2009), Back to Basics: Openings (ChessCafe Back to Basics Chess), Russell Enterprises, ISBN 978-1-88869-044-6
