= Richard Palliser =

English chess player (born 1981)

Personal information
- Born: Richard David Palliser; 18 September 1981 (age 45) Beverley, England

Chess career
- Country: England
- Title: International Master (2001)
- Peak rating: 2482 (July 2012)

Richard David Palliser (born 18 September 1981) is an English chess player and chess writer who holds the title International Master.

Palliser was joint British Rapidplay Chess Champion in 2006. He writes regularly for Everyman Chess who also employ him as an editor and advisor.

His handle on the Internet Chess Club is "worcester".

== Bibliography ==
- Palliser, Richard (2005). Tango! A Dynamic Answer to 1 d4. Everyman Chess. ISBN 1-85744-388-8.
- Palliser, Richard (2006). Beating Unusual Chess Openings. Everyman Chess. ISBN 1-85744-429-9.
- Palliser, Richard (2006). Starting Out: Closed Sicilian. Everyman Chess. ISBN 978-1-85744-414-8.
- Palliser, Richard (2007). Starting Out: Sicilian Najdorf. Everyman Chess. ISBN 978-1-85744-601-2.
- Palliser, Richard (2007). Starting out: the Colle. Everyman Chess. ISBN 978-1-85744-527-5.
- Palliser, Richard; Kosten, Tony; Vigus, James (2008). Dangerous Weapons: Flank Openings. Everyman Chess. ISBN 978-1-85744-583-1.
- Palliser, Richard (2008). Starting out: d-pawn attacks. The Colle-Zukertort, Barry and 150 Attacks. Everyman Chess. ISBN 978-1-85744-578-7.
- Palliser, Richard (2009). Starting Out: the Trompowsky Attack. Everyman Chess. ISBN 978-1-85744-562-6.
- Palliser, Richard; Williams, Simon; Vigus, James (2010). Dangerous Weapons: The Dutch. Everyman Chess. ISBN 978-1-85744-624-1.
