= Alois Wotawa =

Austrian chess composer

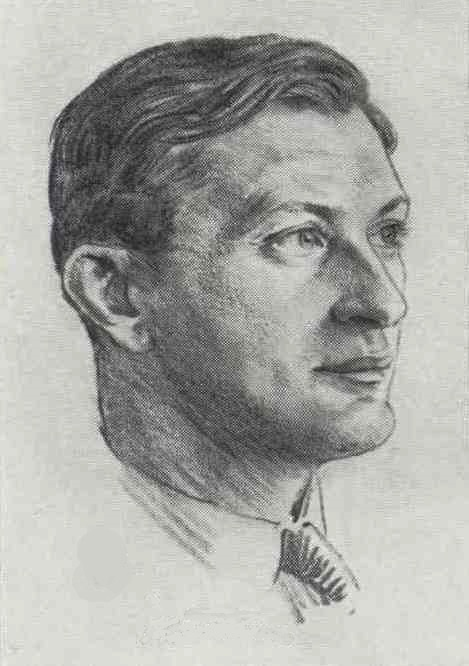
Sketch of Alois Wotawa

Alois Wotawa (11 June 1896 – 12 April 1970) was an Austrian composer of chess problems and endgame studies. He was born and died in Vienna. He was a prosecutor and a member of the Nazi Party.

== Composition career ==
Wotawa composed more than 350 endgame studies, which were published particularly in German-speaking countries. Wotawa also composed some problems that he called "botched endgames".

In 1966, FIDE honored Wotawa as an International Master of Chess Composition.

== Example endgame study ==
In the following study, White finds an amazing move to force a draw.

Alois Wotawa
Österreichische Schachzeitung, 1952

Position: d7 black rook, f7 white knight, g7 black pawn, a6 black bishop, b2 black king, f2 white king, f1 white rook

White to move and draw

Solution:
1. Ne5 Rd2+
2. Ke3 Re2+
3. Kd4 Rxe5
4. Rf6!! Forks the bishop and rook. If Black protects both with 4...Ra5, 5.Rg6 wins the pawn and draws. There remains only 4...g7xf6 stalemate.

== Works ==
- Alois Wotawa: Auf Spurensuche mit Schachfiguren - 150 Endspielstudien [German language]. Vienna, 1965
