= Yakov Neishtadt =

Soviet and Israeli chess author (1923–2023)

Personal information
- Native name: Яков Нейштадт
- Born: 6 October 1923 Moscow, Soviet Union
- Died: 23 March 2023 (aged 99) Beersheba, Israel

Yakov Isaevich Neishtadt (Russian: Яков Исаевич Нейштадт, also transliterated Jakov Isajevich Nejstadt; 6 October 1923 – 23 March 2023) was a Soviet and Israeli chess player and author.

== Biography ==
Yakov Neishtadt was born in Moscow on 6 October 1923. During the Second World War he was a lieutenant commander of a rifle platoon. He participated in the battles of Kharkov, Krivoy Rog, Kirovograd, and Moldova, and was wounded twice, in 1942 and 1944. He received a number of military awards for his outstanding service during the war.

Neishtadt played chess at master level during the 1950s and 1960s, and was awarded the Soviet Master of Sport title in 1961. He was also awarded the title of Judge of the All-Union Category for Chess in 1975. He was executive secretary of the magazine Shakhmaty v SSSR from 1955 to 1973 and deputy editor, then editor in chief of 64 magazine from 1974 to 1979. He wrote books on a variety of chess-related topics, including openings, combinations and chess history. He also served as general editor for Sportverlag publishers of Berlin, collaborating with Mark Taimanov among others, producing a series of German-language opening theory books in the 1970s and 1980s.

Neishtadt was also a strong correspondence chess player, heading the USSR 'B' team in the 7th and 8th correspondence chess olympiads. Between 1984 and 1991 he played in the 12th World Correspondence Chess Championship finals, finishing in 7th place behind Grigory Sanakoev. Following this he was awarded the ICCF International Master title; in 2003 this title was upgraded to that of Senior International Master.

In the early 1990s Yakov Neishtadt settled in Beersheba, Israel. He continued to write books and stayed in active touch with the chess community well into his nineties. He died on 23 March 2023, at the age of 99.

== Books ==
- Shakhmaty do Steinitsa (Chess before Steinitz) (1961)
- Prinyati Ferzevy Gambit (Queen's Gambit Accepted) (1965); English edition 1997, Cadogan
- Otkazanny Ferzevy Gambit : Klassicheskaya Zashchita 2 ... e7-e6 (Queen's Gambit Declined : Classical Defence 2...e6) (1967)
- Katalanskoye Nachalo (Play the Catalan) (1969); English edition 1987, Pergamon
- Pervya Champion Mira (The First World Champion) (1971)
- 250 Lovushek i Kombinatsii (250 Traps and Combinations) (1973)
- Nekorovannye Championy (Uncrowned Champions) (1975)
- Po Sledam Debyutnykh Katastrof (Catastrophe in the Opening) (1979); English edition 1980, Pergamon
- Shakmatny Praktikum (Practical Chess) (1980)
- Test Your Tactical Ability (1981), Batsford
- Shakhmatny Universitet Paulya Keresa (Paul Keres, Chess Master Class) (1982); English edition 1983, Pergamon
- Siegbert Tarrasch (1983)
- Zhertva Ferzya (Queen Sacrifices) (1989); English edition 1991, Pergamon
- Your Move! (1990), Batsford (UK) and Collier (USA)
- Attacking the King (1991), Collier
- Winning Quickly with White (1996), Cadogan
- Winning Quickly with Black (1996), Cadogan
- Win in the Opening! Opening Mistakes and How to Punish Them (1997), Cadogan
- Improve Your Chess Tactics (2012), New in Chess
