= Adrian Mikhalchishin =

Slovenian chess grandmaster (born 1954)

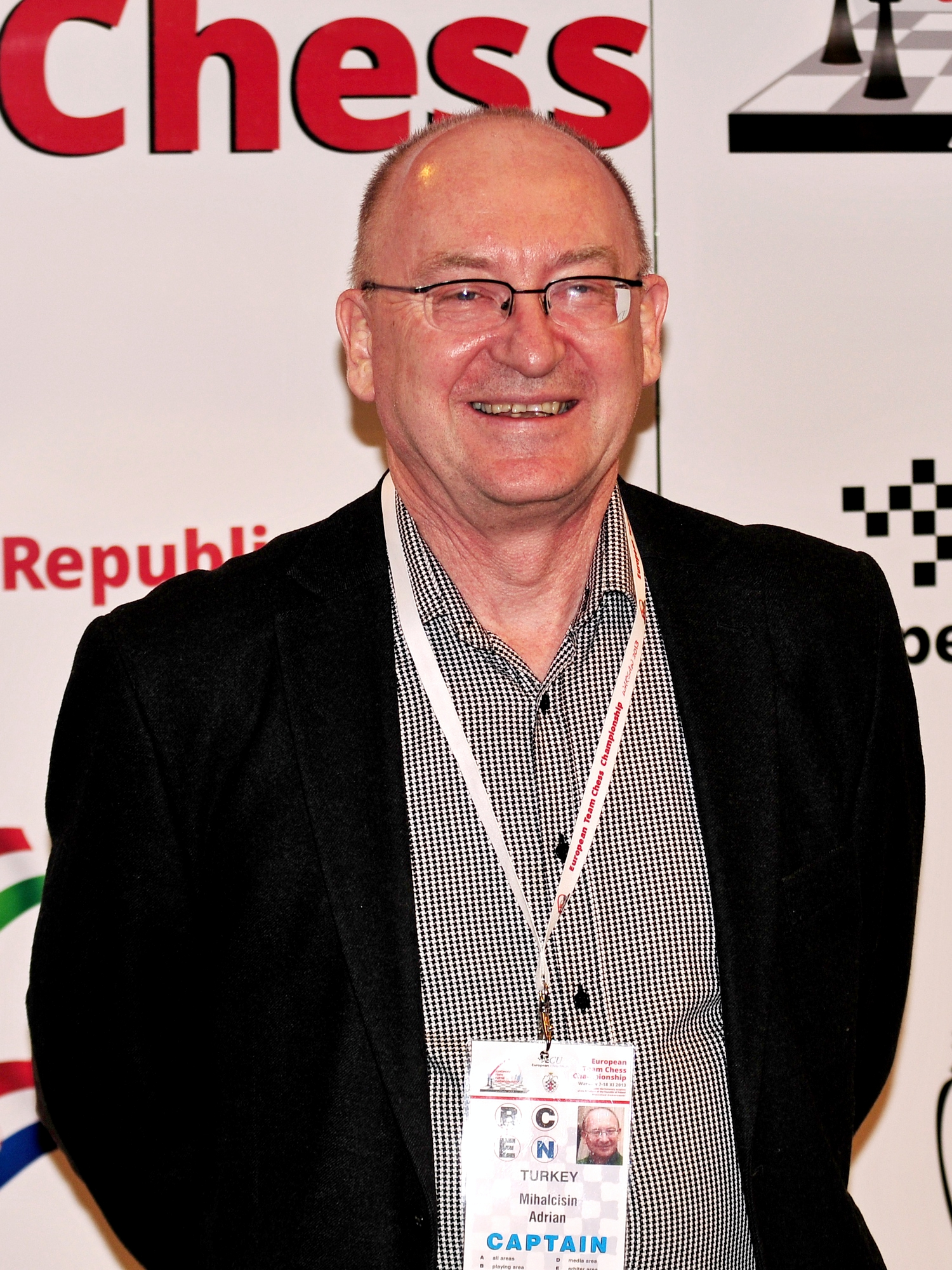
- Mikhalchishin in 2013

Personal information
- Born: November 18, 1954 (age 72) Lviv, Ukrainian SSR, Soviet Union

Chess career
- Country: Soviet Union → Ukraine (before 1996); Slovenia (after 1996)
- Title: Grandmaster (1977)
- FIDE rating: 2409 (November 2026)
- Peak rating: 2552 (July 1999)

Adrian Bohdanovych Mikhalchishin (also Mihalcisin, Mihalčišin or Mykhalchyshyn, Ukrainian: Адріян Богданович Михальчишин, born November 18, 1954) is a Ukrainian and Slovenian chess grandmaster. Education: Lviv University, faculty of physics 1976. Mikhalchishin is married, with two children.

== Biography ==
He became a Grandmaster in 1978, shared first place at the Nikolaev tournament (today in Mykolaiv) in 1983, and was second at Hastings in 1985–86. Vice President of Ukrainian Chess Federation 1998–2001. Speaks Ukrainian, Russian, Polish, Serbo-Croatian, Slovenian, English and German languages.

As a player best result 4th place in Soviet Championship 1984, Soviet Youth champion 1977. During the 1979 Soviet Spartakiad (Spartakiad of Peoples of the USSR), Mikhalchishin represented the chess team of Ukraine (Ukrainian SSR). World Youth Champion in team 1977, 1980, winner of European Cup 1984, winner of international tournaments Banco do Roma 1977, Copenhagen 1980, Leipzig 1979, Brno 1990, Eeklo 1991, Dortmund 1999, Warsaw 2002.

Slovenian Champion 2002. In Ukrainian Championships best result was 2-3 places in 1977 and Rapid chess Ukrainian Champion in 1993, many times junior Champion of the country.

In 1992 he represented Ukraine at the Chess Olympiads 1992, in 2000–2006 – Slovenia.

Winner of team Championships and National Cups of USSR, Ukraine, Slovenia, Yugoslavia, Croatia, Hungary.

== Coach ==
FIDE Senior Trainer from 2002, FIDE TRAINERS COMMISSION Chairman from 2009. Conducted 12 Seminars for FIDE trainers in Germany, UAE, Greece, Spain, Netherlands, Poland, Turkey, Croatia and Austria.

Trainer of Soviet National team 1989–90 World and European Champions.

Trainer of National team Slovenia 1998–2003, National team of Netherlands 2003–2007, National Team of Turkey 2007–08. Conducted training camps with National teams of Poland and Switzerland. Individual training with Maya Tchiburdanidze 1978, Nana Aleksandria -1983, Anatoly Karpov 1980–1986, Aleksandr Beliavsky 1986–1995, Vasyl Ivanchuk 1990, Polgar sisters 1992–1994, Alisa Marić 1994–2000, Zhaoqin Peng 2002–2007, Mateusz Bartel 2000–2009, Ilya Nyzhnyk 2009, Richard Rapport 2010, Arkady Naidich -2005–2006.

Trainer of club AGROUNIVERZAL Belgrade, three times winner of European Women Cup 1993, 1997, 1999.

He is currently coaching the Women's Team in Turkey.

== Books ==
Author of 21 chess books published in Germany, England, France, Spain, Italy, Russia, Ukraine, Poland, Turkey, Yugoslavia, USA.

- Beliavsky, Alexander; Mikhalchishin, Adrian (1995), Winning Endgame Technique, Batsford, ISBN 0-7134-7512-9
- Beliavsky, Alexander; Mikhalchishin, Adrian (1998). Fianchetto Grunfeld. Everyman Chess. ISBN 978-1-85744-204-5.
- Beliavsky, Alexander; Mikhalchishin, Adrian (2000), Winning Endgame Strategy, Batsford, ISBN 0-7134-8446-2
- Beliavsky, Alexander; Mikhalchishin, Adrian (2003), Modern Endgame Practice, Batsford, ISBN 0-7134-8740-2

== Chessbase Discs ==
- The Secret Weapons of the Champions
- Decision Making in Chess
- Power of Planning
- Arkhangelsk
- Power of Exchange
- Winning Structures
- Strategy University Vol 1: The Central Approach
- Strategy University Vol 2: Prevention and Preparation in Chess
- Strategy University Vol 3: Positional Pawn Sacrifice
- The King in the Center
- 1.e4 e5 – An Active Repertoire for Black
- Pattern Recognition and Typical Plans
- Pawn Structures you Should Know

== Family ==
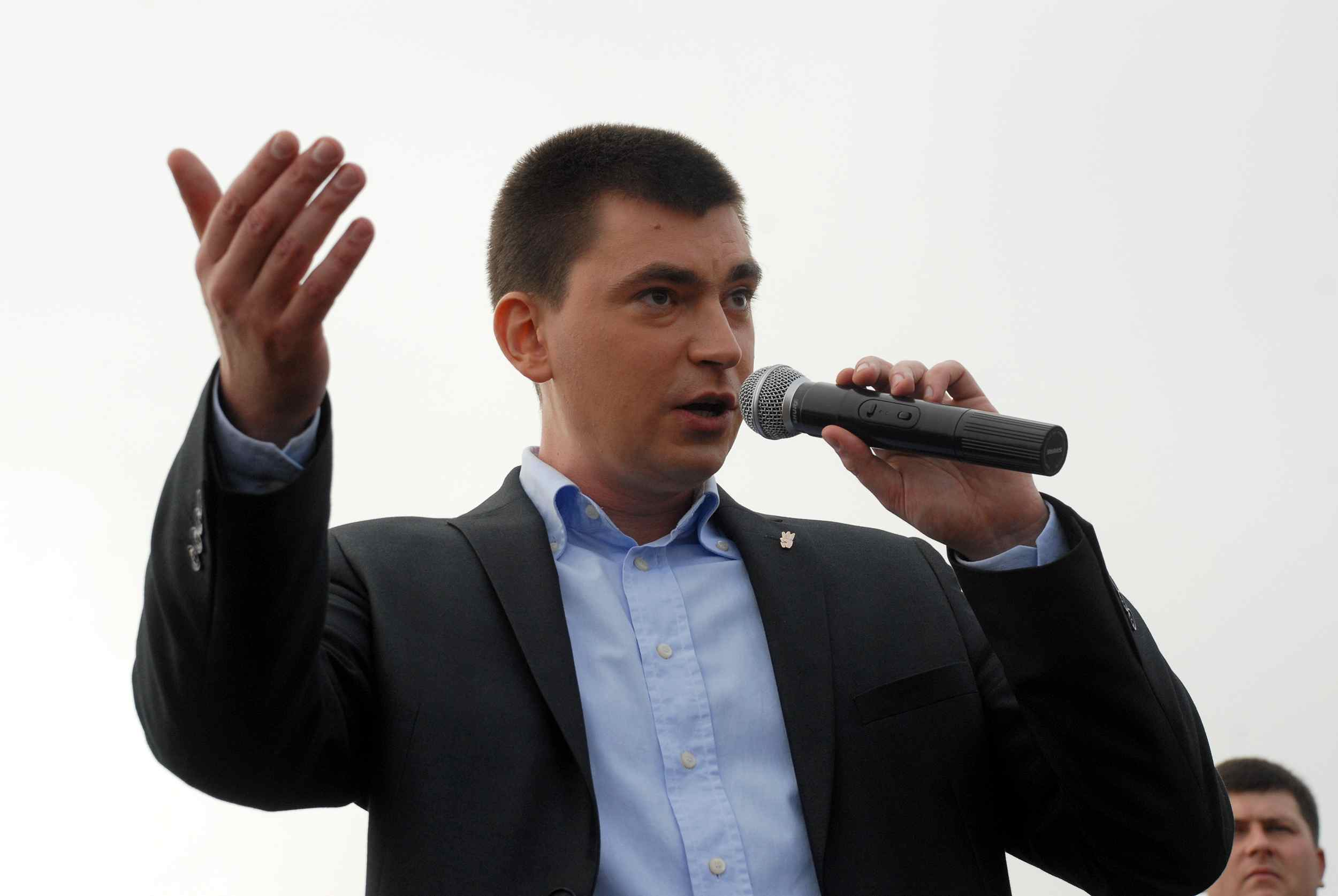
Yuriy Mykhalchyshyn

His son Yuriy Mykhalchyshyn is a Ukrainian politician, a member of the Ukrainian political party Svoboda.
