= Priyome =

Typical maneuver or technique in chess

Priyome (Russian: приём, IPA: [prʲɪˈjɵm]) is a Russian noun that is used directly and generically in English to represent some sort of typical maneuver or technique in chess. For example, a typical defensive technique in rook endings is to use the king to attack the opponent's pawns.

In Russian, приём is a common word with various meanings including "reception", "acceptance" and "gimmick", and is used in contexts as diverse as music, literature, computer science, and martial arts. It is also very common in Russian chess literature to refer to typical maneuvers used in positions with certain pawn structures or other defining characteristics. Because the word does not have an exact equivalent in English—with "device", "technique", or "method" the closest translations—it has appeared untranslated in English-language chess literature, although this usage is not yet widespread.

== Examples ==
A Russian movie, Buket Na Priyome, is a crime drama highlighting the technique as a theme and tactic. A famous game by Garry Kasparov in Nicaragua has been used by training academies to illustrate the technique. After e4–e5 in the first diagram below, the d-file is potentially open, and thus a candidate to be controlled by White's rooks:

Position: e8 black knight, e7 black king, f7 black pawn, a6 black pawn, d6 black pawn, e6 black rook, h6 black pawn, a5 white pawn, b5 black rook, c5 black pawn, e5 white pawn, g5 black pawn, b4 black pawn, c4 white knight, b3 white pawn, f3 white pawn, h3 white pawn, c2 white pawn, d2 white rook, f2 white king, g2 white pawn, d1 white rook

Moving the rook to the d-file is a priyome, or recommended response. In annotations, moves with exclamation points suggest priyomes.

Example of Black vs. White priyomes
Black to move

Position: a8 black rook, c8 black bishop, d8 black queen, f8 black rook, g8 black king, a7 black pawn, g7 black pawn, h7 black pawn, b6 black pawn, f6 black knight, g6 black pawn, c5 black pawn, d5 white pawn, e5 black pawn, a4 white pawn, c4 white pawn, e4 white pawn, c3 white pawn, d3 white bishop, e3 white bishop, g2 white pawn, h2 white pawn, a1 white rook, d1 white queen, f1 white rook, g1 white king

In this game from the 1972 Spassky–Fischer World Championship, Spassky played 16.a4, and Fischer answered with 16...a5!. This is a typical defensive technique (priyome) in similar positions, to fix the weakness of the a4-pawn.
White to move

Position: c8 black rook, e8 black king, g8 black rook, b7 black pawn, c7 black queen, e7 black bishop, f7 black pawn, g7 black pawn, h7 black pawn, a6 black pawn, c6 black bishop, d6 black pawn, f6 black knight, e5 black pawn, f5 white pawn, e4 white pawn, b3 white bishop, c3 white knight, e3 white bishop, g3 white queen, a2 white pawn, b2 white pawn, c2 white pawn, g2 white pawn, h2 white pawn, a1 white rook, f1 white rook, g1 white king

In this Zsofia Polgar–Apol game from 1988, Polgar played the priyome with 16.Bg5! – again a typical maneuver in this pawn structure, to exchange the bishop for the f6-knight and gain control of the d5-square.
