= Frank Lamprecht =

German chess player and trainer (born 1968)

Personal information
- Born: June 21, 1968 (age 58)

Chess career
- Country: Germany
- Title: International Master (1999)
- Peak rating: 2419 (July 2000)

Frank Lamprecht (born 21 June 1968) is a German chess International Master and chess trainer. He is a co-author of Fundamental Chess Endings (2001) and Secrets of Pawn Endings (2000), both with Karsten Müller.

He has been a chess trainer since 1983.

He gained the title of International Master in 1999. He has played in the Oberliga Nord for the Hamburg club Königsspringer SC since the 1984–85 season.

Lamprecht is known for his books on chess endgames, which he wrote together with Hamburg's Bundesliga player and Grandmaster Karsten Müller. Their book Fundamental Chess Endings won the Book of the Year award of the British Chess Federation.

== Work ==
- Karsten Müller and Frank Lamprecht: Secrets of Pawn Endings. Everyman Chess, London, 2000, ISBN 1-85744-255-5. (Reprinted with corrections: Gambit, London 2008, ISBN 1-904600-88-3)
- Karsten Müller and Frank Lamprecht: Fundamental Chess Endings. Gambit, London 2001, ISBN 1-901983-53-6.
- Karsten Müller and Frank Lamprecht: Grundlagen der Schachendspiele. Gambit, London 2003 (German language edition of Fundamental chess endings), ISBN 1-901983-96-X.
