= Dražen Marović =

Croatian chess grandmaster (born 1938)

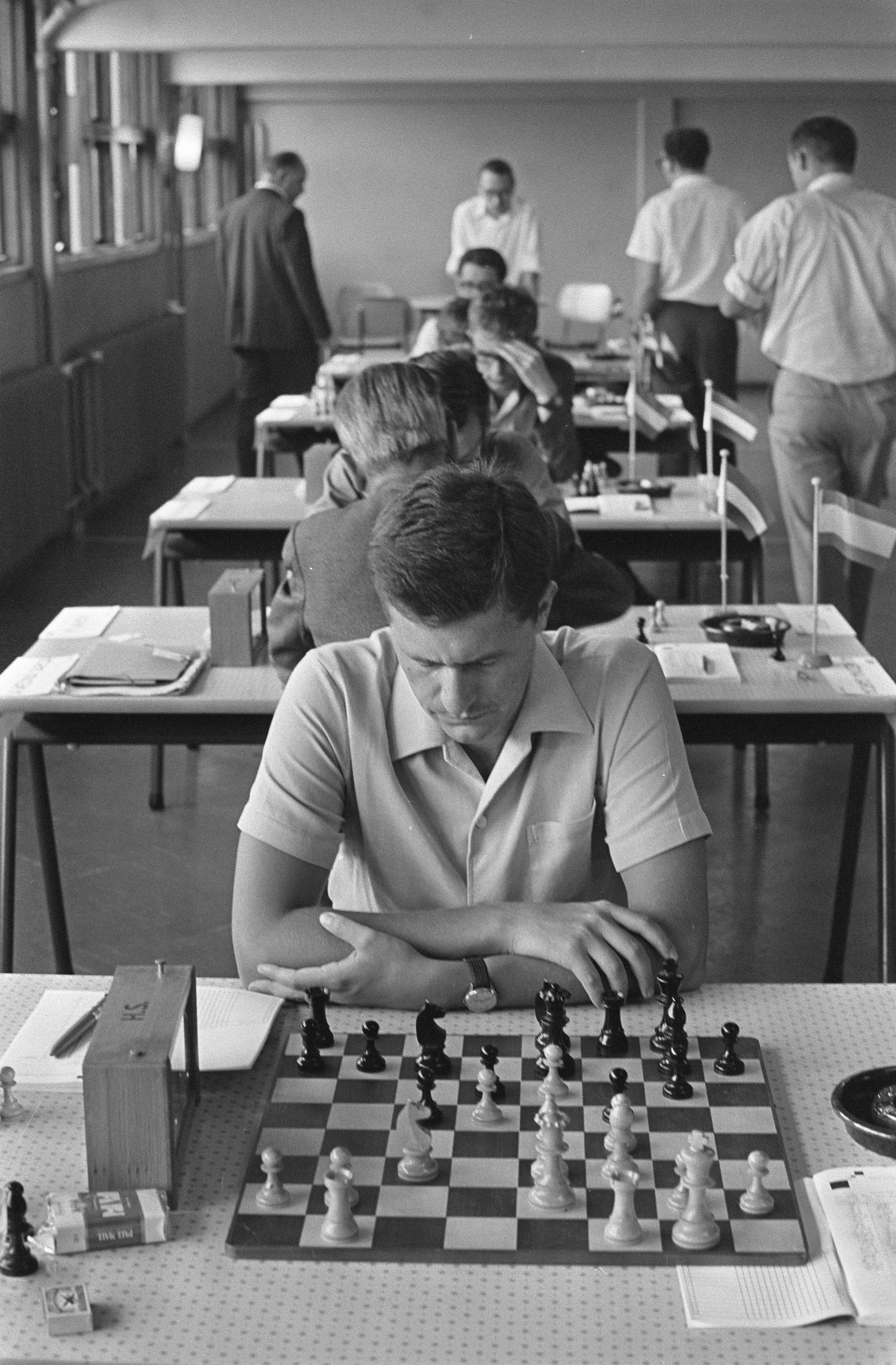
- Dražen Marović, Amsterdam 1967

Personal information
- Born: January 14, 1938 (age 88) Split, Croatia

Chess career
- Country: Croatia
- Title: Grandmaster (1975)
- FIDE rating: 2445 (July 2026)
- Peak rating: 2490 (May 1974)
- Peak ranking: No. 92 (January 1975)

Dražen Marović (born January 14, 1938, in Split) is a Croatian chess grandmaster who was active in former Yugoslavia, later a trainer, journalist, writer and broadcaster.

== Biography ==
Marović started learning chess at the relatively late age of sixteen. Despite this, he made remarkable progress in the game, finishing second in the Yugoslav Junior Championship only two years later. In pursuit of a profession, he obtained a degree in Literature which, when coupled with his gift for languages, provided him with a lifetime career teaching Italian, Spanish and English.

Marović's international tournament results showed a steadily progressing talent for chess, with strong results during his participation in tournaments in Zagreb in 1964 (2nd= with Bruno Parma after László Szabó), Málaga in 1968 (1st= with Borislav Ivkov), Zagreb in 1971 (1st), Zagreb in 1972 (2nd= with Mato Damjanovic and Vlastimil Hort after Leonid Stein), Virovitica in 1978 (1st) and Sainte-Maxime in 1982 (1st).

Equally impressive was his fourth-place finish in a strong field competing at Skopje in 1970, where he outscored, among others, Yugoslavia's then number one Svetozar Gligorić and Yuri Balashov.

With these international successes came the award of International Master and International Grandmaster titles in 1965 and 1975 respectively.

Marović first represented Yugoslavia in team competition at the European Team Chess Championship of 1961 at Oberhausen, an effort that contributed to a silver team medal. Further selection for the Hamburg 1965 event brought about the same outcome, while he also notched up an impressive 70% individual score. In between times he was a member of Yugoslavia's team at the World Student Team Championships in 1962, 1963 and 1964, his participation helping to secure team silver medals on two more occasions.

He became inactive as a chess player in the early 1990s, choosing to devote much more of his time to training, journalism and authoring chess books. He has coached individuals and national teams, including his own nation (Croatia).

Among Marović's students who have made notable achievements are Bojan Kurajica, the 1965 World Junior Chess Champion and Mohammed Al-Modiahki, the first Grandmaster from an Arab country.

Marović has provided expert commentary on televised chess events, and was for a time the editor of a prominent chess magazine in his home country, Sahovski Glasnik.

Book writing may however be the area in which Marović has really excelled. During the 1970s, 80s and 90s he followed the boom in chess opening theory, authoring popular texts on mainstream openings, such as the King's Indian Defence and the Queen's Gambit. He also penned some chess opening repertoire books, including Opening Repertoire for Black (co-authored with Bruno Parma) and An Active Repertoire For Black (Batsford, 1991).

Since 2000, he has been writing for Gambit Publications, and his work has focused more on his experiences as a player and trainer, discussing elements of strategy and dynamics in chess. His books have been well received by chess players and reviewers alike.

Outside of chess, Marović has listed football, cinema and reading among his favorite interests and hobbies.

== Recent bibliography ==
- Understanding Pawn Play in Chess (Gambit, 2000)
- Dynamic Pawn Play in Chess (Gambit, 2001)
- Secrets of Positional Chess (Gambit, 2003)
- Secrets of Chess Transformations (Gambit, 2004)
