= Neil McDonald (chess player) =

English chess grandmaster (born 1967)

Personal information
- Born: 21 January 1967 (age 59) Gravesend, Kent, England

Chess career
- Country: England
- Title: Grandmaster (1996)
- Peak rating: 2500 (July 1996)

Neil McDonald (born 21 January 1967) is an English chess grandmaster and chess writer.

== Chess career ==
As an English Chess Federation coach he has trained many of the country's strongest junior players and was Head Coach of the English Chess Federation team at the Greece World Schools Championship in 2013. He regularly escorts blind and partially sighted chess players to international World Championship events.

McDonald authored the French Defence monthly updates on chesspublishing.com from October 1999 until March 2009, 1 e4 ... updates from November 2009 until January 2010, 1 e4 ... from June 2014 until February 2015 and returned to 1 e4 ... in March 2017 until January 2018.

He became an International Master in 1986 and was awarded the Grandmaster title in 1996.

McDonald obtained his FIDE Trainer qualification in 2016.

== Bibliography ==
The Chess Press	Year	ISBN
Opening Guides: Dutch Leningrad	1997	ISBN 978-1-901259-03-2

Batsford Books	Year	ISBN
Planning (Think Like a Chess Master)	1995	ISBN 978-0-7134-7573-9
Winning With the Kalashnikov	1995	ISBN 978-0-7134-7576-0
Mastering the French (with Andrew Harley)	1997	ISBN 978-0-7134-5716-2
The King's Gambit: A Modern View	1998	ISBN 978-0-7134-8451-9
Mastering Chess Tactics	2002	ISBN 978-0-7134-8772-5
The Sveshnikov Sicilian	2003	ISBN 978-0-7134-8581-3
Mastering Checkmates	2003	ISBN 978-0-7134-8774-9
The Benko Gambit Revealed	2004	ISBN 978-0-7134-8868-5
Chess: The Art of Logical Thinking	2004	ISBN 978-0-7134-8894-4
The Sicilian Bb5 Revealed	2005	ISBN 978-0-7134-8980-4
The Art of Planning in Chess: Move By Move	2006	ISBN 978-0-7134-9025-1
Chess Success: Planning After the Opening	2007	ISBN 978-0-7134-9071-8

Everyman Chess	Year	ISBN
Positional Sacrifices	1995	ISBN 978-1-85744-110-9
Modern Chess Miniatures	1995	ISBN 978-1-85744-166-6
Practical Endgame Play	1996	ISBN 978-1-85744-176-5
French Winawer	2000	ISBN 978-1-85744-276-2
Modern Defence (with Jon Speelman)	2000	ISBN 978-1-85744-281-6
Main Line Caro-Kann	2001	ISBN 978-1-85744-227-4
Concise Chess Openings	2001	ISBN 978-1-85744-297-7
Concise Chess Endings	2002	ISBN 978-1-85744-313-4
Starting Out: The English	2003	ISBN 978-1-85744-322-6
Concise Chess Middlegames	2004	ISBN 978-1-85744-356-1
Starting Out: The Dutch Defence	2005	ISBN 978-1-85744-377-6
The Masters: Rudolf Spielmann Master of Invention	2006	ISBN 978-1-85744-406-3
Starting Out: 1 e4: A reliable repertoire for the improving player	2006	ISBN 978-1-85744-416-2
Starting Out: Queen's Gambit Declined	2006	ISBN 978-1-85744-426-1
Chess Secrets: The Giants of Strategy: Learn from Kramnik, Karpov, Petrosian, Capablanca and Nimzowitsch	2007	ISBN 978-1-85744-541-1
How to Play against 1 e4	2009	ISBN 978-1-85744-586-2
Chess Secrets: The Giants of Power Play: Learn from Topalov, Geller, Bronstein, Alekhine and Morphy	2009	ISBN 978-1-85744-597-8
Starting Out: The Réti	2010	ISBN 978-1-85744-622-7
Play the Dutch: An Opening Repertoire for Black based on the Leningrad Variation	2010	ISBN 978-1-85744-641-8
The Ruy Lopez: Move by Move	2011	ISBN 978-1-85744-669-2
Break the Rules! A Modern Look at Chess Strategy	2012	ISBN 978-1-85744-673-9
King's Indian Attack: Move by Move	2014	ISBN 978-1-85744-988-4
The Catalan: Move by Move	2017	ISBN 978-1-78194-263-5
Coach Yourself	2019	ISBN 978-1-78194-512-4
Your Chess Battle Plan	2020	ISBN 978-1-78194-528-5
