= Karsten Müller =

German chess grandmaster and author (born 1970)

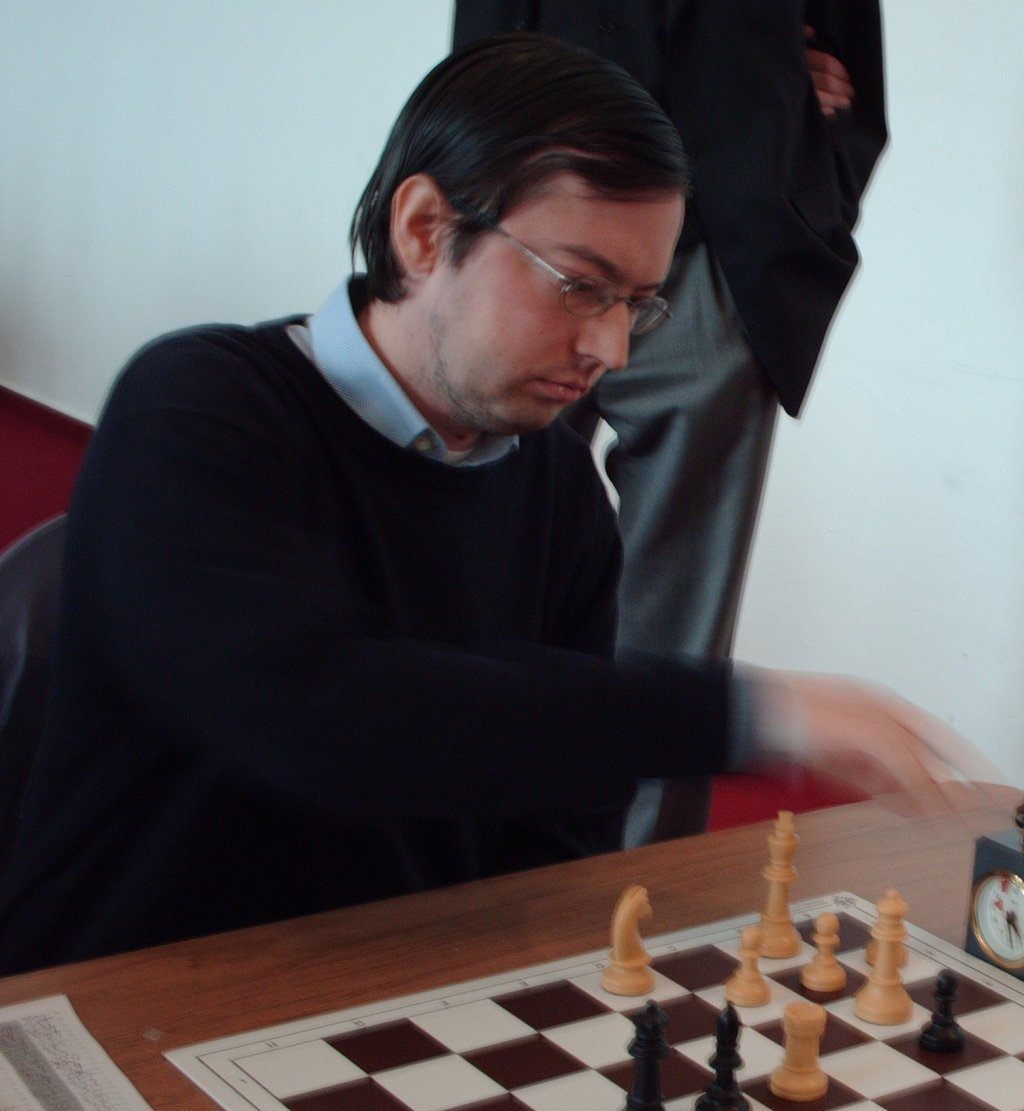
- Müller in 2006

Personal information
- Born: November 23, 1970 (age 55) Hamburg, West Germany

Chess career
- Country: Germany
- Title: Grandmaster (1998)
- FIDE rating: 2532 (July 2026)
- Peak rating: 2536 (December 2013)

Dr. Karsten Müller (born November 23, 1970, in Hamburg, West Germany) is a German chess Grandmaster and author. He earned the Grandmaster title in 1998 and a PhD in mathematics in 2002 at the University of Hamburg. He had placed third in the 1996 German championship and second in the 1997 German championship.

He has written about endgames, including in Fundamental Chess Endings (Gambit Publications, 2001) and Secrets of Pawn Endings (Everyman Chess, 2000), both with Frank Lamprecht. He also wrote How to Play Chess Endgames, with Wolfgang Pajeken (Gambit, 2008) and Magic of Chess Tactics (Russell Enterprises 2003) with FIDE Master Claus Dieter Meyer. His column "Endgame Corner" has appeared at ChessCafe.com since January 2001 and he has been a regular contributor to ChessBase Magazine since 1997. He also contributed material to some of the early issues of the online daily chess newspaper Chess Today.

The seventh chapter of Tibor Karolyi's 2009 book Genius in the Background is devoted to him. His main interest apart from chess are football and mathematical games.

== Books ==
- Müller, Karsten; Lamprecht, Frank (2000), Secrets of Pawn Endings, Everyman Chess, ISBN 978-1-85744-255-7 Corrected edition by Gambit in 2007, ISBN 978-1-904600-88-6.
- Müller, Karsten; Lamprecht, Frank (2001), Fundamental Chess Endings, Gambit Publications, ISBN 1-901983-53-6
- Müller, Karsten; Meyer, Claus Dieter (2002), The Magic of Chess Tactics, Russell Enterprises, ISBN 1-888690-14-3
- Müller, Karsten (2004), The ChessCafe Puzzle Book, Russell Enterprises, ISBN 1888690216
- Müller, Karsten (2008), The ChessCafe Puzzle Book 2: Test and Improve Your Positional Intuition, Russell Enterprises, ISBN 9781888690439
- Müller, Karsten; Pajeken, Wolfgang (2008), How to Play Chess Endings, Gambit Publications, ISBN 978-1-904600-86-2
- Müller, Karsten (2009), Bobby Fischer (The Career and Complete Games of the American World Chess Champion), Russell Enterprises, ISBN 978-1-888690-59-0
- Müller, Karsten; Van Delft, Merijn (2010), ChessCafe Puzzle Book, No. 3: Test and Improve Your Defensive Skill!, Russell Enterprises, ISBN 9781888690668
- Müller, Karsten (2013), Gelfand-Anand 2012: Match for the World Chess Championship, Russell Enterprises, ASIN B00GI0R28O

== ChessBase Products ==
Karsten has authored a large number of ChessBase products. These can be found online here
