= Hagen Poetsch =

German chess grandmaster (born 1991)

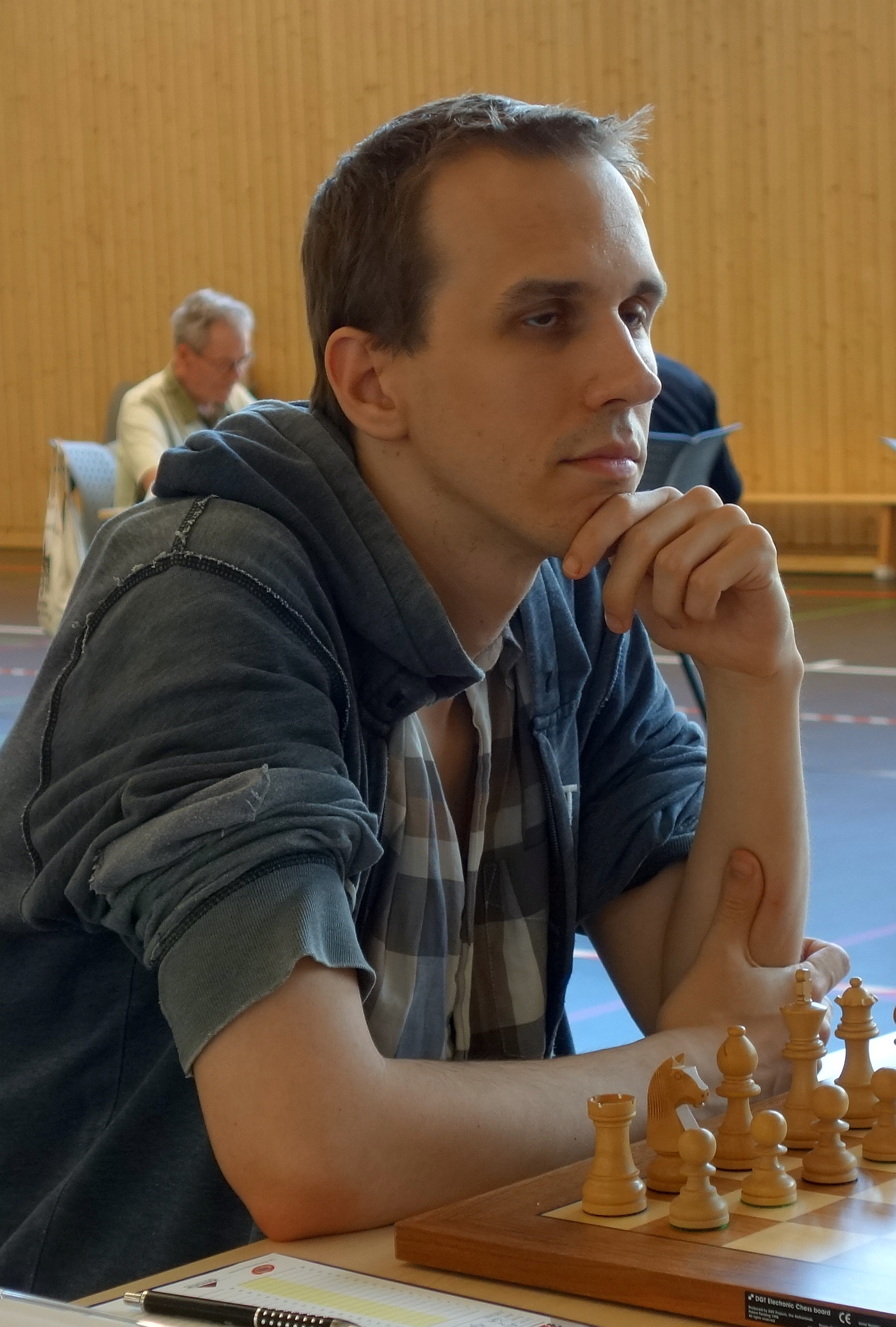
- Poetsch in 2024

Personal information
- Born: August 27, 1991 (age 34) Berlin, Germany

Chess career
- Country: Germany
- Title: Grandmaster (2018)
- FIDE rating: 2444 (July 2026)
- Peak rating: 2531 (February 2020)

Hagen Poetsch is a German chess grandmaster.

== Chess career ==
In 2013, he shared first place with Alexey Kim, Batuhan Daştan, Stanislav Novikov, Ralf Åkesson, Jonathan Hawkins and Kacper Drozdowski in the 18th Vienna Chess Open.

In April 2018, he won the Capablanca Memorial tournament in Crete with a score of 6.5/10, half a point ahead of runner-up Daniel Fernandez.

In October 2025, he tied for first place with Nico Stelmaszyk, Soham Datar, Martin Heider, and Daniel Kurpriyanov in the Worms Nibelungen Open. He was ranked in fifth place after tiebreak scores.

In November 2025, he tied for first place with Alexander Bagrationi, Anwesh Upadhyaya, Liu Yi, and Lennart Schröder in the Muensterland Open. He was ranked in third place after tiebreak scores.
