= Spartak Vysochin =

Ukrainian chess grandmaster (born 1975)

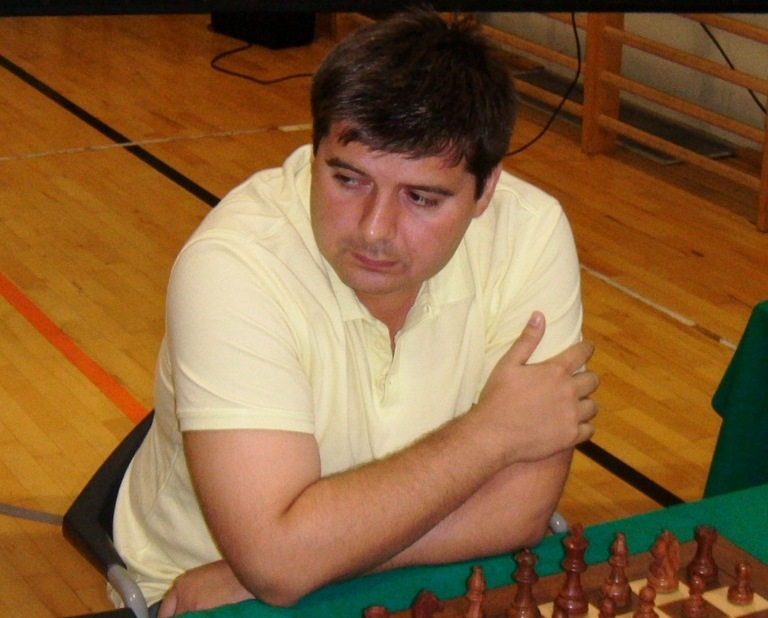

Personal information
- Born: April 30, 1975 (age 51) Kyiv, Ukrainian SSR, Soviet Union

Chess career
- Country: Ukraine
- Title: Grandmaster (2001)
- FIDE rating: 2512 (July 2026)
- Peak rating: 2599 (July 2004)

Spartak Leonidovich Vysochin is a Ukrainian chess grandmaster.

== Chess career ==
In 2003, he tied for 3rd–10th with Vladimir Belov, Andrey Shariyazdanov, Farrukh Amonatov, Alexey Kim, Alexander Areshchenko, Mikhail Ulibin and Alexei Kornev in the St.Petersburg 300 Open tournament.

In December 2019, he tied for 5th place with Pavel Eljanov and Yuriy Kuzubov in the Ukrainian Chess Championship.

In August 2022, he tied for first place with six other players in the rapid portion of the Ukrainian Independence Cup, ultimately being ranked in second place after tiebreak scores.
