= Andrey Shariyazdanov =

Russian chess grandmaster (born 1976)

Personal information
- Born: July 12, 1976 (age 49)

Chess career
- Country: Russia (until 2025); Serbia (since 2025)
- Title: Grandmaster (1998)
- FIDE rating: 2475 (July 2026)
- Peak rating: 2605 (January 2000)

Andrey Shariyazdanov (Russian: Андрей Шариязданов; born July 12, 1976) is a Russian chess Grandmaster and European Junior Champion in 1996. He played for Russia B team at the 33rd Chess Olympiad in Elista

== Chess career ==
In 1998 he took first place in the 5th World University Chess Championship in Rotterdam, helping Russia to win the team gold.

In 2003 he tied for 3rd–10th with Vladimir Belov, Alexei Kornev, Farrukh Amonatov, Alexey Kim, Alexander Areshchenko, Mikhail Ulibin and Spartak Vysochin in the St.Petersburg 300 Open tournament. In 2004 he tied for 1st–5th with Christian Bauer, Boris Avrukh, Alexander Rustemov and Pavel Eljanov in the Masters Section of the Biel Chess Festival.
