= Stanislav Novikov =

Russian chess grandmaster (born 1985)

Personal information
- Born: July 6, 1985 (age 41) Moscow, Soviet Union

Chess career
- Country: Russia
- Title: Grandmaster (2004)
- FIDE rating: 2518 (July 2026)
- Peak rating: 2569 (September 2010)

Stanislav Yurievich Novikov is a Russian chess grandmaster.

== Chess career ==
In 2004, he was awarded the Grandmaster title, after having achieved his norms at the:

- International Chess Tour in Moscow in September 2001
- International Chess Tour in Moscow in May 2004
- E. Afromeev Memorial in July 2004

In 2013, he shared first place with Alexey Kim, Batuhan Daştan, Hagen Poetsch, Ralf Åkesson, Jonathan Hawkins and Kacper Drozdowski in the 18th Vienna Chess Open.

In July 2016, he finished in second place at the Czech Rapid Open with 7.5/9, half a point behind winner Kacper Piorun.
