= Alexei Kornev =

Russian chess grandmaster (born 1976)

Personal information
- Born: December 20, 1976 (age 49) Vyazniki, Vladimir Oblast, Soviet Union

Chess career
- Country: Russia
- Title: Grandmaster (2004)
- FIDE rating: 2500 (July 2026)
- Peak rating: 2582 (January 2004)

Alexei Nikolaevich Kornev is a Russian chess grandmaster.

== Chess career ==
In 2003, he tied for 3rd–10th with Vladimir Belov, Andrey Shariyazdanov, Farrukh Amonatov, Alexey Kim, Alexander Areshchenko, Mikhail Ulibin and Spartak Vysochin in the St.Petersburg 300 Open tournament.

He tied for 1st–3rd places with Konstantin Chernyshov and Dmitry Andreikin at Lipetsk 2006.

In 2013, he wrote a book on the King's Indian Attack called A Practical White Repertoire with 1 d4 and 2 c4, Volume 2.
