= Mikhail Ulibin =

Russian chess grandmaster (born 1971)

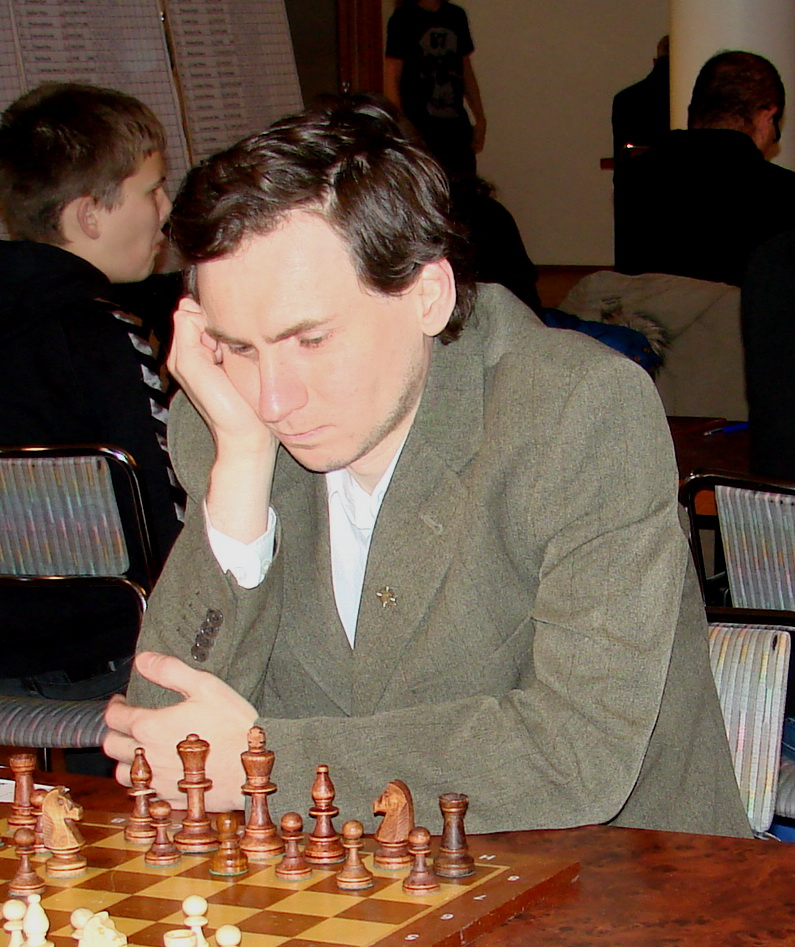
- Ulibin, Rilton Cup 2009

Personal information
- Born: Mikhail Vitalyevich Ulibin; 31 May 1971 (age 55)

Chess career
- Country: Soviet Union → Russia
- Title: Grandmaster (1991)
- Peak rating: 2589 (July 2002)

Mikhail Vitalyevich Ulibin (Russian: Михаил Витальевич Улыбин; born 31 May 1971) is a Russian chess player, who was awarded the title of grandmaster by FIDE in 1991.

== Chess career ==
He played in the Soviet junior championships from 1984 to 1988. Ulibin took the silver medal in the World Junior Chess Championship of 1991.

Soviet Junior Championships
Year	Placement	Points	Reference
1984	Tied 14th-17th	6.5	
1985	3rd place	8.0	
1986	Tied 2nd-5th	7.5	
1987	Tied 5th-9th	7.0	
1988	Tied 1st-2nd	8.5	

In 1994, he finished second behind Peter Svidler in the Russian championship at Elista and played for Russia's second team in the Moscow Chess Olympiad. His team took he bronze medal.

He won the 1998/1999 Rilton Cup in Stockholm. In 2001, Ulibin won the Monarch Assurance International tournament at Port Erin, Isle of Man. In 2002, he won the Masters' tournament of the 12th Abu Dhabi Chess Festival edging out Evgeny Gleizerov and Shukhrat Safin on tiebreak, after all finished on 6½/9 points. In 2003, he tied for 3rd–10th with Vladimir Belov, Alexei Kornev, Farrukh Amonatov, Alexey Kim, Alexander Areshchenko, Andrey Shariyazdanov, and Spartak Vysochin in the St. Petersburg 300 Open tournament. Ulibin came first in the Master Open Tournament in Biel 2007 and in the Zagreb Open in 2010. In 2011, he won the Central Serbia Championship in Paraćin; tied for 2nd–6th with Konstantine Shanava, Maxim Turov, Robert Hovhannisyan, and Levon Babujian in the 4th Karen Asrian Memorial tournament in Jermuk; and came first at Winterthur.
