= Jonathan Hawkins =

English chess grandmaster (1983–2025)

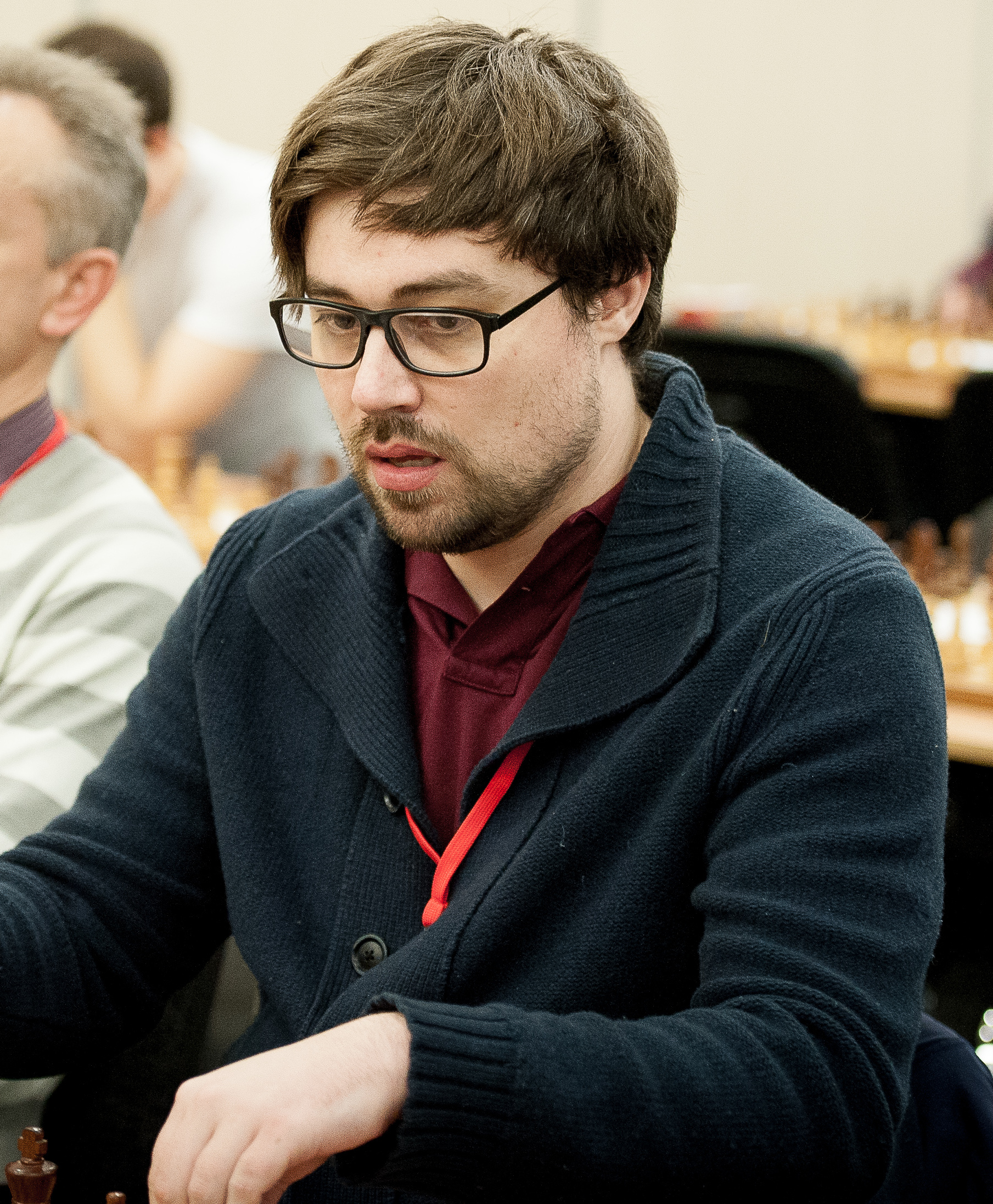
- Hawkins in 2016

Personal information
- Born: 1 May 1983 Consett, County Durham, England
- Died: 22 December 2025 (aged 42) Torbay, Devon, England

Chess career
- Country: England
- Title: Grandmaster (2014)
- FIDE rating: 2570 (September 2026)
- Peak rating: 2592 (February 2018)

Jonathan Hawkins (1 May 1983 – 22 December 2025) was an English chess grandmaster. He was the British Chess Champion in 2015, having outscored David Howell with whom he shared the title in 2014.

== Chess career ==
Hawkins's chess career was unusual for the modern era in that he showed only modest ability as a child; his improvement from club player to International Master took place after he left full-time education, and while living in County Durham, far from traditional centres of chess activity. About this sudden rise through the rankings, in his 2012 endgame book Amateur to IM, he notes that "a careful study of the endgame sparked the biggest leap forward in my own game".

As well as his double British championship titles, tournament wins by Hawkins include the British Rapidplay Chess Championships in 2012 and 2014, making him the British champion at both standard and rapid time limits. In 2013 he tied for first place in the 18th Vienna Open with Stanislav Novikov, Batuhan Daştan, Hagen Poetsch, Alexey Kim, Ralf Åkesson and Kacper Drozdowski. Hawkins was part of the English contingent at the rapidplay tournament of the 2014 London Chess Classic. His game against the former world champion Vladimir Kramnik at that event was notable for its simultaneous attacks against both castled kings and the "exquisite zugzwang" to which Hawkins succumbed.

Hawkins attained the FIDE titles of FIDE Master (FM) in 2008, International Master (IM) in 2010 and Grandmaster (GM) in 2014. His ascent from IM to GM was delayed two years by a lack of results against non-English players. This meant he became one of the highest-rated IMs in the world, outranking the majority of English GMs, and was the first winner of the British Championship since Michael Hennigan in 1993 who had not earned the GM title by the end of the tournament.

Hawkins was a full-time chess player and coach based in London and Devon.

== Death ==
He died from neuroendocrine cancer in Torbay, Devon on 22 December 2025, at the age of 42.

== Publications ==
- From Amateur to IM (2012)
