= Dávid Bérczes =

Hungarian chess grandmaster (born 1990)

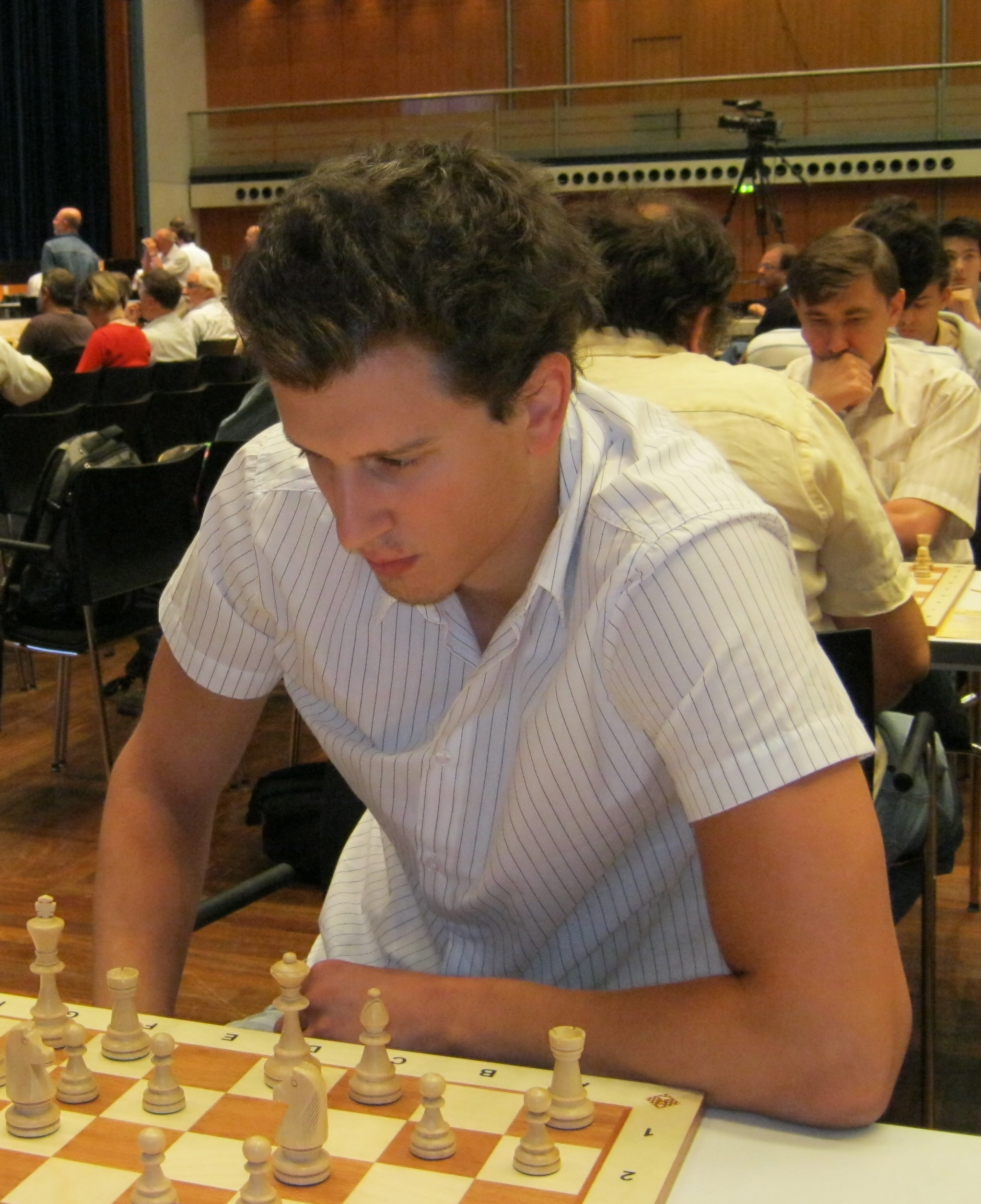

Personal information
- Born: 14 January 1990 (age 36) Borås, Sweden

Chess career
- Country: Hungary
- Title: Grandmaster (2008)
- Peak rating: 2560 (January 2012)

Dávid Bérczes (born 14 January 1990) is a Hungarian chess Grandmaster. FIDE awarded him the International Master title in 2005 and the Grandmaster title in 2008.

== Chess career ==
He tied for 3rd–6th with Evgeny Gleizerov, Yuriy Kuzubov and Pia Cramling in the Rilton Cup 2008/2009. In 2011, he tied for 2nd–7th with Deep Sengupta, Viacheslav Zakhartsov, Krisztián Szabó, Lev Gutman, Samuel Shankland and Maxim Turov in the ZMDI Schachfestival in Dresden. In 2014, Bérczes tied for 1st–5th with Timur Gareev, Sergei Azarov, Daniel Naroditsky and Sam Shankland in the Millionaire Chess Open in Las Vegas, Nevada.

His elder brother Csaba Bérczes is also a chess player, an International Master.

In the Andorran Open of 2012 he scored 6,5 points in 9 rounds, achieving 13th place.

In March 2019, Berczes earned clear first place in the Charlotte Chess Center's Spring 2019 GM Norm Invitational held in Charlotte, North Carolina with an undefeated score of 6.5/9.
