= Evgeny Gleizerov =

Russian chess grandmaster (born 1963)

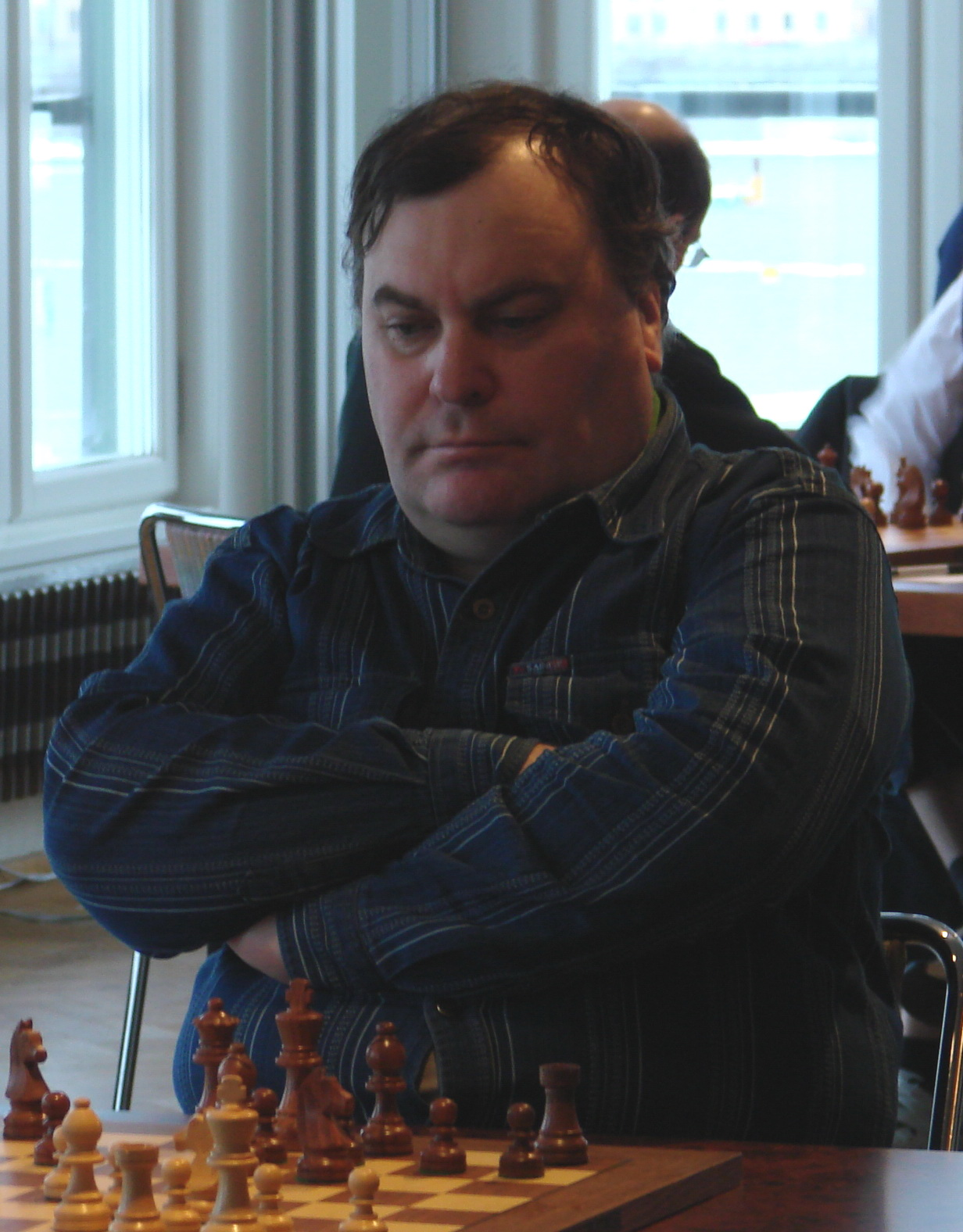
- Gleizerov in 2009

Personal information
- Born: 20 March 1963 (age 63) Bryansk, Russian SFSR, Soviet Union

Chess career
- Country: Soviet Union (until 1991); Russia (since 1991)
- Title: Grandmaster (1993)
- Peak rating: 2600 (May 2011)

Evgeny Emmanuilovich Gleizerov (Russian: Евгений Эммануилович Глейзеров; born 20 March 1963) is a Russian chess player. He was awarded the title of Grandmaster by FIDE in 1993.

Together with 43 other Russian chess players, Gleizerov signed an open letter to Russian president Vladimir Putin, protesting against the 2022 Russian invasion of Ukraine and expressing solidarity with the Ukrainian people.

== Chess career ==
In 2001 Gleizerov tied for 1st–3rd places with Stanislav Voitsekhovsky and Michał Krasenkow at Barlinek. The next year he tied for 1st–3rd in the Masters tournament of the 12th Abu Dhabi Chess Festival with Mikhail Ulibin, who won on tiebreak score, and Shukhrat Safin. He tied for 3rd–6th with Dávid Bérczes, Yuriy Kuzubov and Pia Cramling in the Rilton Cup 2008/2009. He came first at Parla 2009. In 2010 he tied for 1st–6th with Kamil Mitoń, Bojan Kurajica, Yuri Gonzalez Vidal, Lázaro Bruzón and Bartłomiej Heberla in the 4th Torneo Internacional de Ajedrez Ciudad de La Laguna. In 2011 he tied for 1st–4th with Gadir Guseinov, Merab Gagunashvili and Sergei Tiviakov in the 19th Fajr Open Chess Tournament and won the International Championship of Slovakia in Banská Štiavnica. Gleizerov was part of the Russian team that won the gold medal at the European Senior Team Championship 2019 in the 50+ category.

== Notable games ==
- Iivo Nei vs Evgeny Gleizerov, Osterskars op 1995, French Defense: Advance Variation (C02), 0-1
