= Deep Sengupta =

Indian chess grandmaster (born 1988)

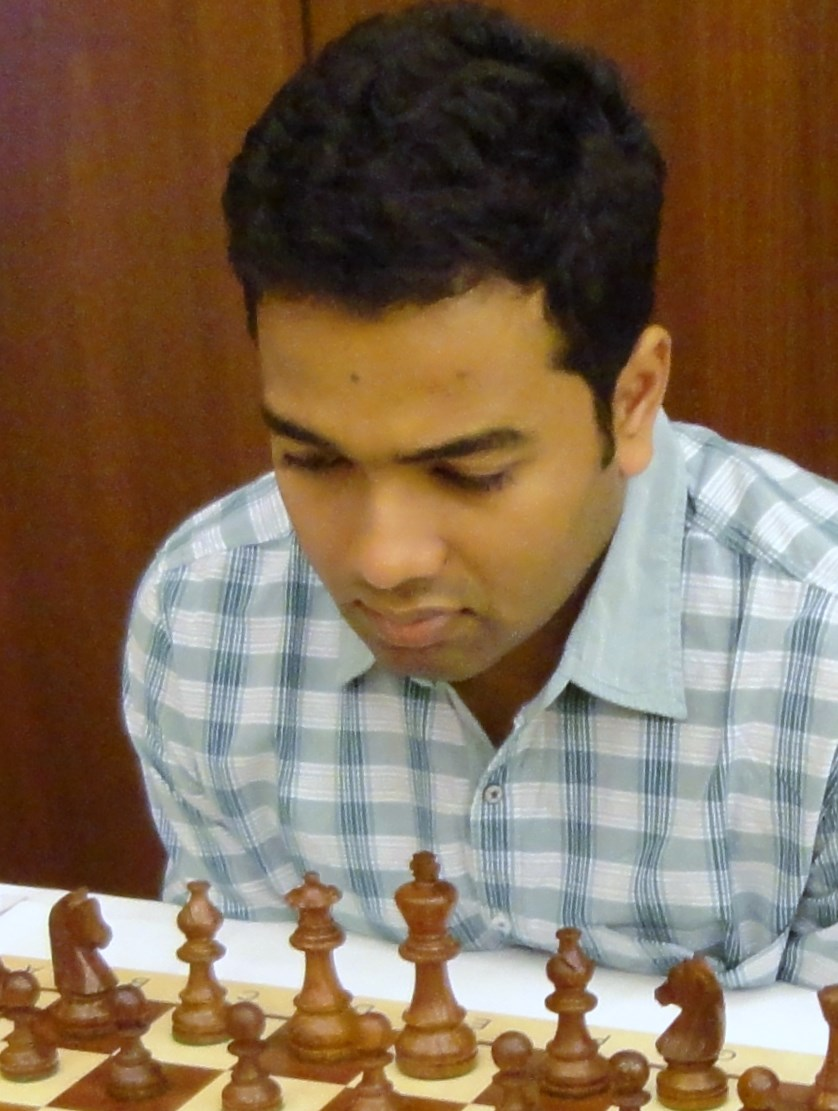
- Deep Sengupta (2014)

Personal information
- Born: 30 June 1988 (age 38) Chakradharpur, Jharkhand, India

Chess career
- Country: India
- Title: Grandmaster (2010)
- FIDE rating: 2473 (July 2026)
- Peak rating: 2596 (July 2017)

Deep Sengupta (born 30 June 1988) is an Indian chess player. He is India's 22nd player to be awarded the title Grandmaster by FIDE. Sengupta competed in the FIDE World Cup in 2017.

== Career ==
Born in Chakradharpur, Sengupta started chess with the Chakradharpur Chess Academy. He won the World Youth Chess Championships in the Under 12 category in 2000.

Sengupta achieved his first norm for the title Grandmaster (GM) in the World Junior Chess Championship in Kochi, India in December 2004 and won the Indian juniors title in 2005.

In April 2009, he won the Doeberl Cup, earning his second GM norm. In 2010, he tied for the top position with Tigran Gharamian and Vadim Malakhatko at the 24th Open "Pierre and Vacances" in Cannes, thereby completing the requirements for the Grandmaster title. He tied for first with Arghyadip Das in the 2010/11 Hastings Masters tournament and won the event on tiebreak. In 2011 he tied for 2nd–7th with Maxim Turov, Viacheslav Zakhartsov, Krisztián Szabó, Lev Gutman, Dávid Bérczes and Samuel Shankland in the ZMDI Open in Dresden. He was placed 4th in the Indian Chess Championship 2012. Sengupta won the 2014 Commonwealth Chess Championship, held in Glasgow, edging out Aravindh Chithambaram on tiebreak score. Both players concluded the event with 7½/9 points each. Sengupta won the 2016/2017 Hastings tournament, being a clear winner with 7/9 points. This led to his name being embedded in the Golombek Trophy once again. Sengputa also tied for first at the 2017/2018 Hastings Congress. In 2019 he tied with Jan Gustafsson for first in the Bangkok Open.

== Personal life ==
Sengupta resides in Kasba. He works for the Oil and Natural Gas Corporation of India. He has an elder brother, Pratik Sengupta, who plays chess as well.
