= Konstantin Tarlev =

Ukrainian chess grandmaster (born 1987)

Personal information
- Born: February 9, 1987 (age 39)

Chess career
- Country: Ukraine
- Title: Grandmaster (2013)
- FIDE rating: 2537 (September 2026)
- Peak rating: 2598 (June 2016)

Konstantin Sergeevich Tarlev is a Ukrainian chess grandmaster.

== Chess career ==
He was awarded the Grandmaster title in 2013, achieving his norms at the:

- Romanian Team Championship in September 2012
- International Chess Festival PRO-LOGOS A tournament in August 2012
- Victor Ciolcitea Memorial in March 2013

In April 2018, he tied for 2nd place in the Kathmandu Open with six other players, finishing in third place after tiebreaks.

In August 2018, he tied 2nd - 9th place in the 11th Arad International chess festival along with Dimitrios Mastrovasilis, Imre Balog, J. Deepan Chakkravarthy, Mihnea Costachi, Tiberiu Georgescu, Vlad-Cristian Jianu, and Daniel Baratosi.

In October 2022, he played for Schachclub Viernheim 1934e.V. in the European Club Cup, where he also won the bronze medal on the board 6-8 open section.
