= Vlad-Cristian Jianu =

Romanian chess grandmaster (born 1984)

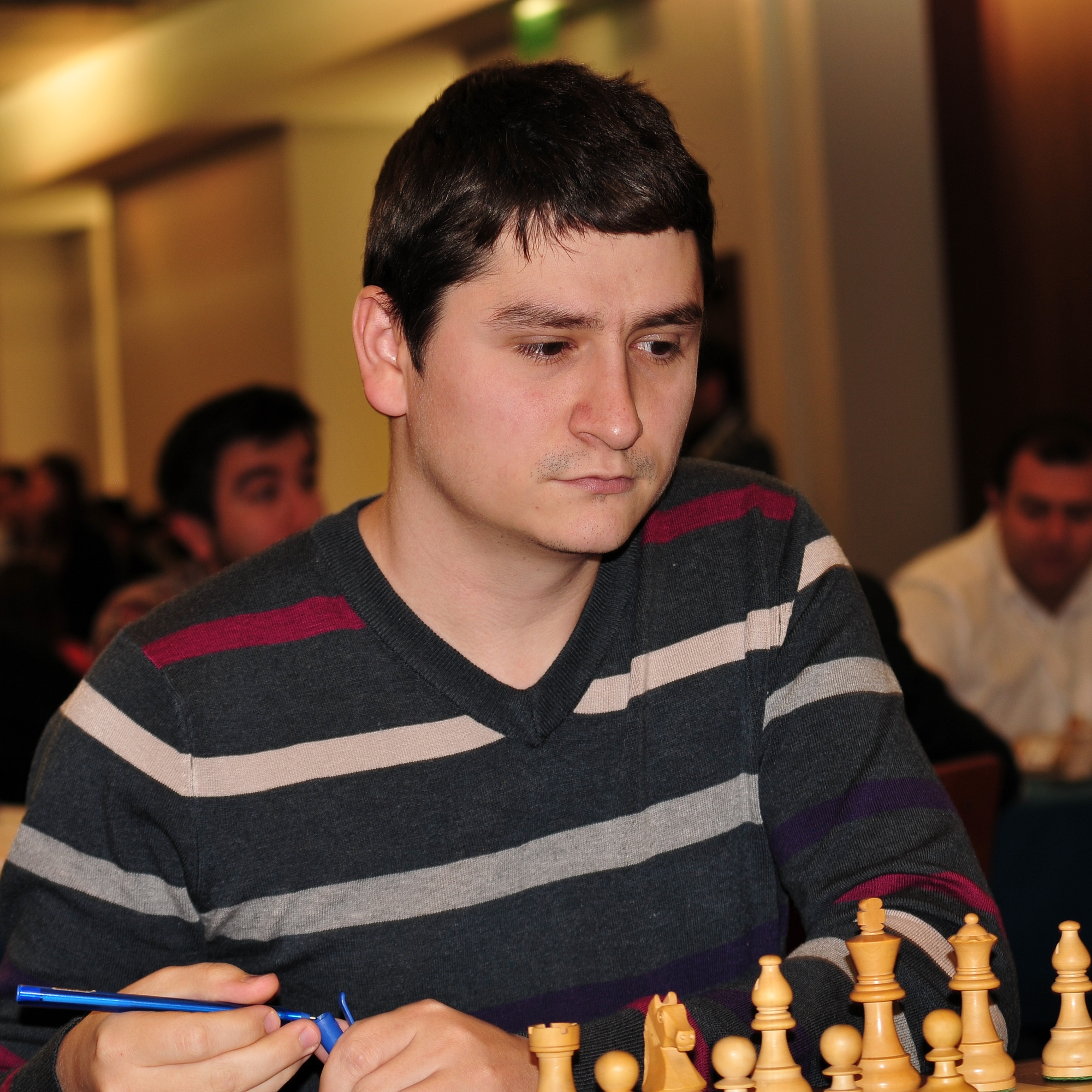

Personal information
- Born: September 27, 1984 (age 41) Bucharest, Romania

Chess career
- Country: Romania
- Title: Grandmaster (2007)
- FIDE rating: 2435 (July 2026)
- Peak rating: 2588 (September 2014)

Vlad-Cristian Jianu (born September 27, 1984 in Bucharest) is a Romanian chess grandmaster (2007).

== Career ==
Jianu won the Romanian champion in 2006, and national champion in problem solving (Predeal 2006, Bucharest 2012). He won the Romanian National Championship in Blitz and Rapid in 2012.

He played for Romania at two chess olympiads: 2014 and 2016. He also participated in two European team championships (2007 and 2013)

He won three silver medals: in Szeged (1994, World Championships under 10), Baile Herculane (1994, European Championships under 10) and in Rimavska Sobota (1996, European Championships up to 12 years old)

In addition, he has been a three-time medalist of the European Under-18 junior team championships (all tournaments were played in Balatonlelle): gold (2002), silver (2001) and bronze (2000).

In 2010, he won the 2nd Limpedea Cup.

In 2013, he won the Open d'Avoine, and the 10th Open International d’échecs de Plancoët. Additionally, he tied 1st - 8th in the Capelle-la-Grande in France along with Sanan Sjugirov, Parimarjan Negi, Maxim Rodshtein, Sergey Fedorchuk, Eric Hansen, Alexei Fedorov, and Yuri Vovk. (before tiebreaks)

In 2016, he won the fast chess competitions within the 10th Tournament of Kings in Medias.

In 2018, he tied 2nd - 9th place in the 11th Arad International chess festival along with Dimitrios Mastrovasilis, Imre Balog, J. Deepan Chakkravarthy, Mihnea Costachi, Tiberiu Georgescu, Konstantin Tarlev, and Daniel Baratosi.

In 2019, he tied 1st - 3rd in the Targu Mures Open with GM Marius Manolache, and IM Anton Teodor. (2nd place after tiebreaks)

As of January 2022, Jianu is ranked the 6th best chess player in Romania. His highest chess rating was 2588 in September 2014.
