= Kamil Mitoń =

Polish chess grandmaster (born 1984)

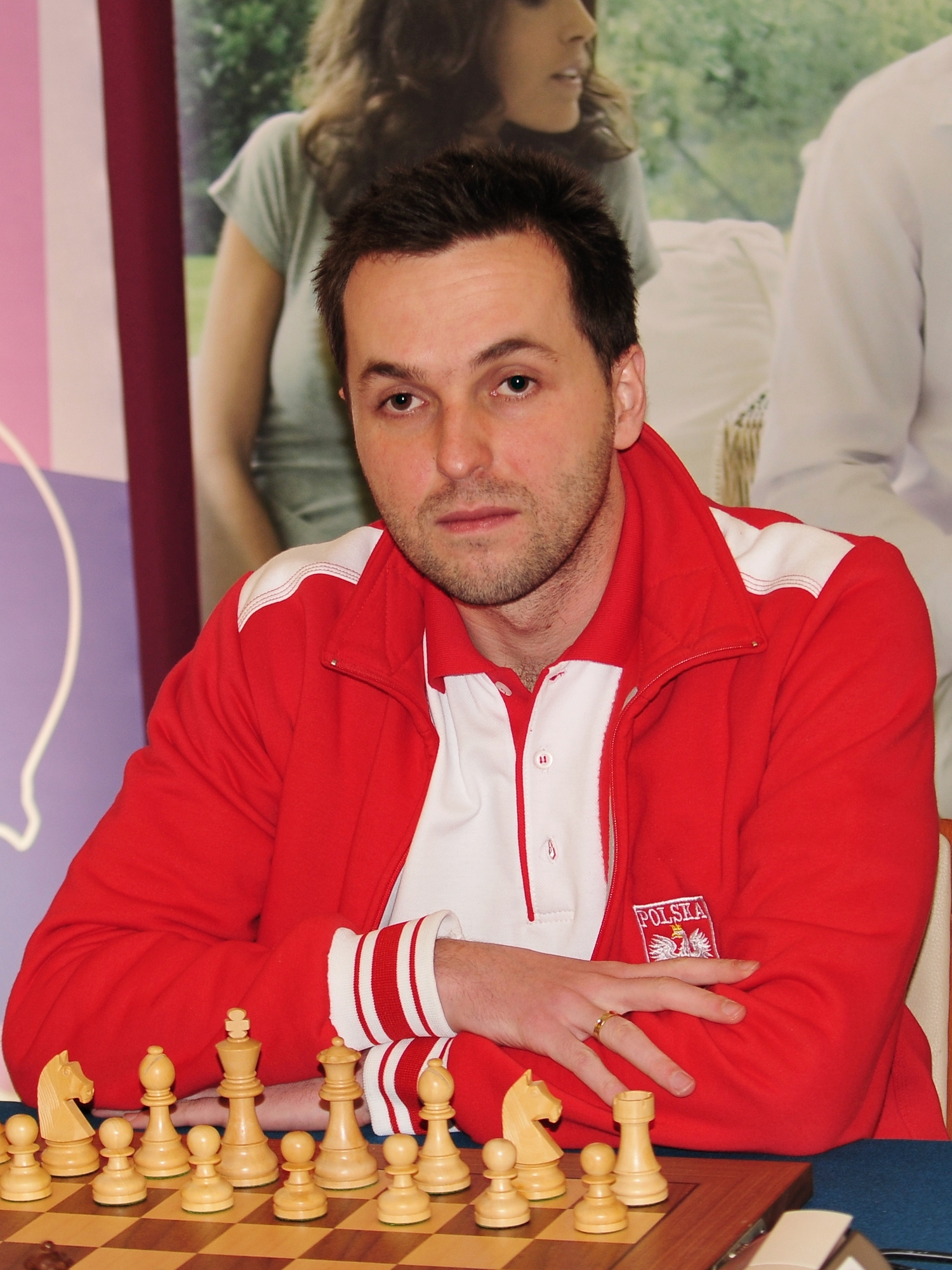
- Kamil Mitoń (2013)

Personal information
- Born: 12 April 1984 (age 42) Kraków, Poland

Chess career
- Country: Poland
- Title: Grandmaster (2002)
- FIDE rating: 2568 (November 2026)
- Peak rating: 2655 (January 2007)
- Peak ranking: No. 50 (January 2007)

Kamil Mitoń (born 12 April 1984) is a Polish chess Grandmaster (2002).

== Career ==
In 1996, he won the World Chess U12 Championship, in Menorca.

He won the tournaments 2000 in Cannes/France and 2005 in Bajade de la Virgen (ahead of Kolev, Damljanovic, Fridman, Krivoshey, Spassov, Avrukh and others). In 2005 he tied for first with Magesh Chandran Panchanathan in the 33rd World Open, played in Philadelphia over the Independence Day weekend. In the same year he tied for 2nd–5th with Lazaro Bruzon, Zhang Pengxiang and Artyom Timofeev in the Samba Cup in Skanderborg. In December 2007, he came first in the 17th Magistral de Elgoibar tournament. In 2010 he tied for 1st–6th with Lázaro Bruzón, Bojan Kurajica, Yuri Gonzalez Vidal, Evgeny Gleizerov and Bartłomiej Heberla in the 4th Torneo Internacional de Ajedrez Ciudad de La Laguna and won the event on tie-break. In 2011, he tied for 1st–6th with Ivan Sokolov, Vladimir Baklan, Yuriy Kuzubov, Jon Ludvig Hammer and Illia Nyzhnyk in the MP Reykjavík Open.

In 2008 he played in the chess Olympiad in Dresden scoring 4 points in 8 games on the second board. In September 2010 he played for the Polish team at the Olympiad in Khanty-Mansiysk scoring 7.5 points out of 10 games.
