= Jianu =

Jianu is a Romanian surname. It may refer to:

- Iancu Jianu (b. 1797), Wallachian Romanian hajduk
- Vlad-Cristian Jianu (b. 1984), Romanian chess grandmaster
- Filip Cristian Jianu (b. 2001), Romanian tennis player
