= Krisztián Szabó (chess player) =

Hungarian chess grandmaster (born 1989)

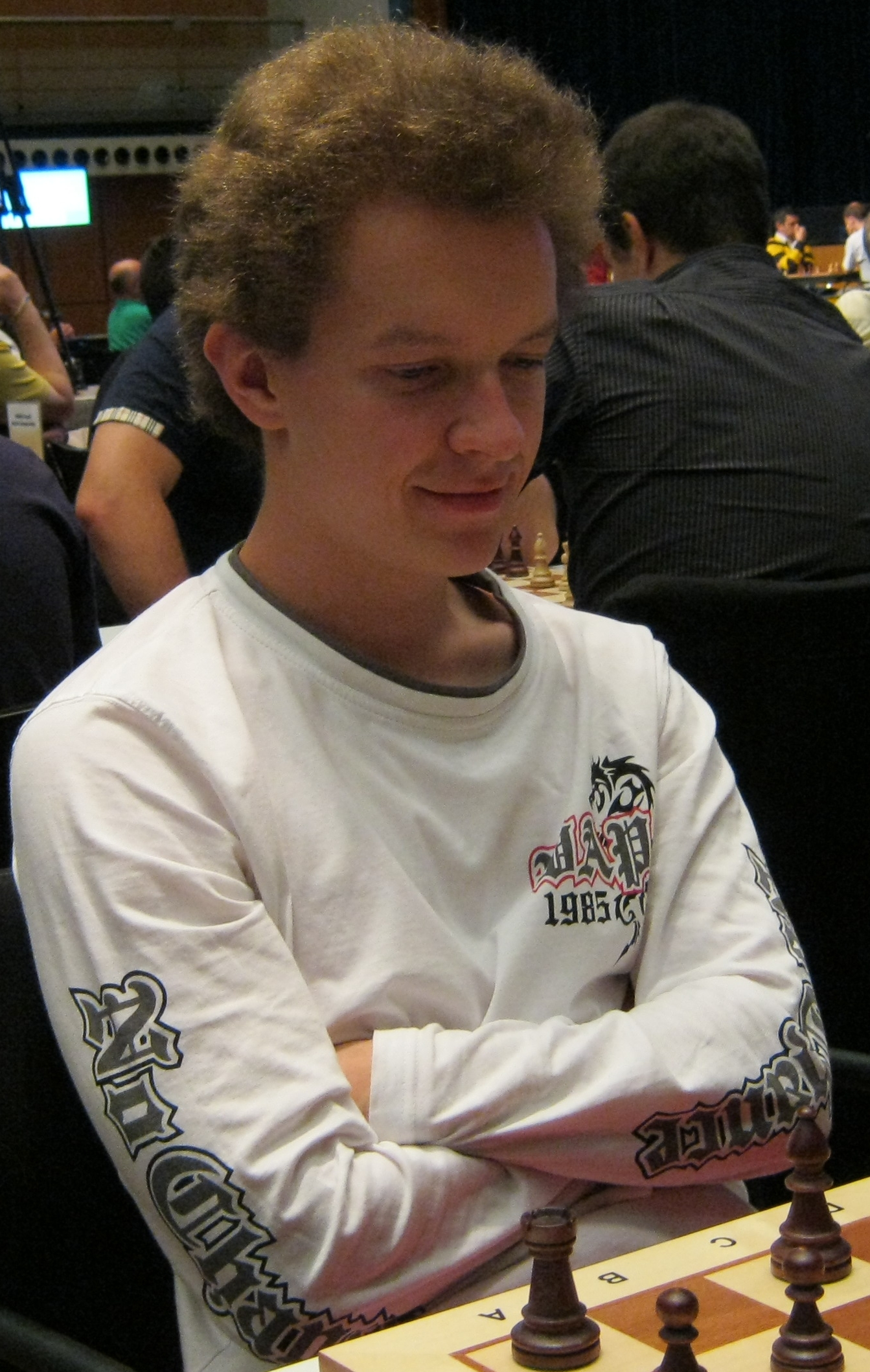

Personal information
- Born: June 21, 1989 (age 37) Székesfehérvár, Hungary

Chess career
- Country: Hungary
- Title: Grandmaster (2010)
- FIDE rating: 2480 (July 2026)
- Peak rating: 2564 (November 2013)

Krisztián Szabó is a Hungarian chess grandmaster.

== Chess career ==
He achieved the Grandmaster title in 2010, earning his norms at the:

- First Saturday GM tournament in June 2009
- 26th Cappelle-la-Grande International Open in February 2010
- Hungarian Team Championship Final in May 2010

In 2011 he tied for 2nd–7th with Maxim Turov, Viacheslav Zakhartsov, Deep Sengupta, Lev Gutman, Dávid Bérczes and Sam Shankland in the ZMDI Open in Dresden.

He has been a second or analysis partner for top Hungarian grandmasters Richard Rapport, Judit Polgar, and Peter Leko. He runs a chess academy.
