= Julian Kramer =

German chess grandmaster (born 1997)

Personal information
- Born: June 12, 1997 (age 29)

Chess career
- Country: Germany
- Title: Grandmaster (2025)
- FIDE rating: 2483 (September 2026)
- Peak rating: 2503 (November 2024)

Julian Kramer is a German chess grandmaster.

== Chess career ==
In October 2024, he played for the Hamburger SK team in the Bundesliga tournament, during which he defeated grandmaster Konstantin Tarlev from the Viernheim team. The game allowed him to cross 2500 in rating and was featured as Game of the Week by ChessBase writer Merijn van Delft.

He was awarded the Grandmaster title in 2025, after achieving his norms at the:

- European Individual Chess Championship in April 2022
- 16th BPB Limburg Open 2024 Tienkamp in May 2024
- Schachbundesliga 2024–2025 in April 2025
