= Bartłomiej Heberla =

Polish chess grandmaster (born 1985)

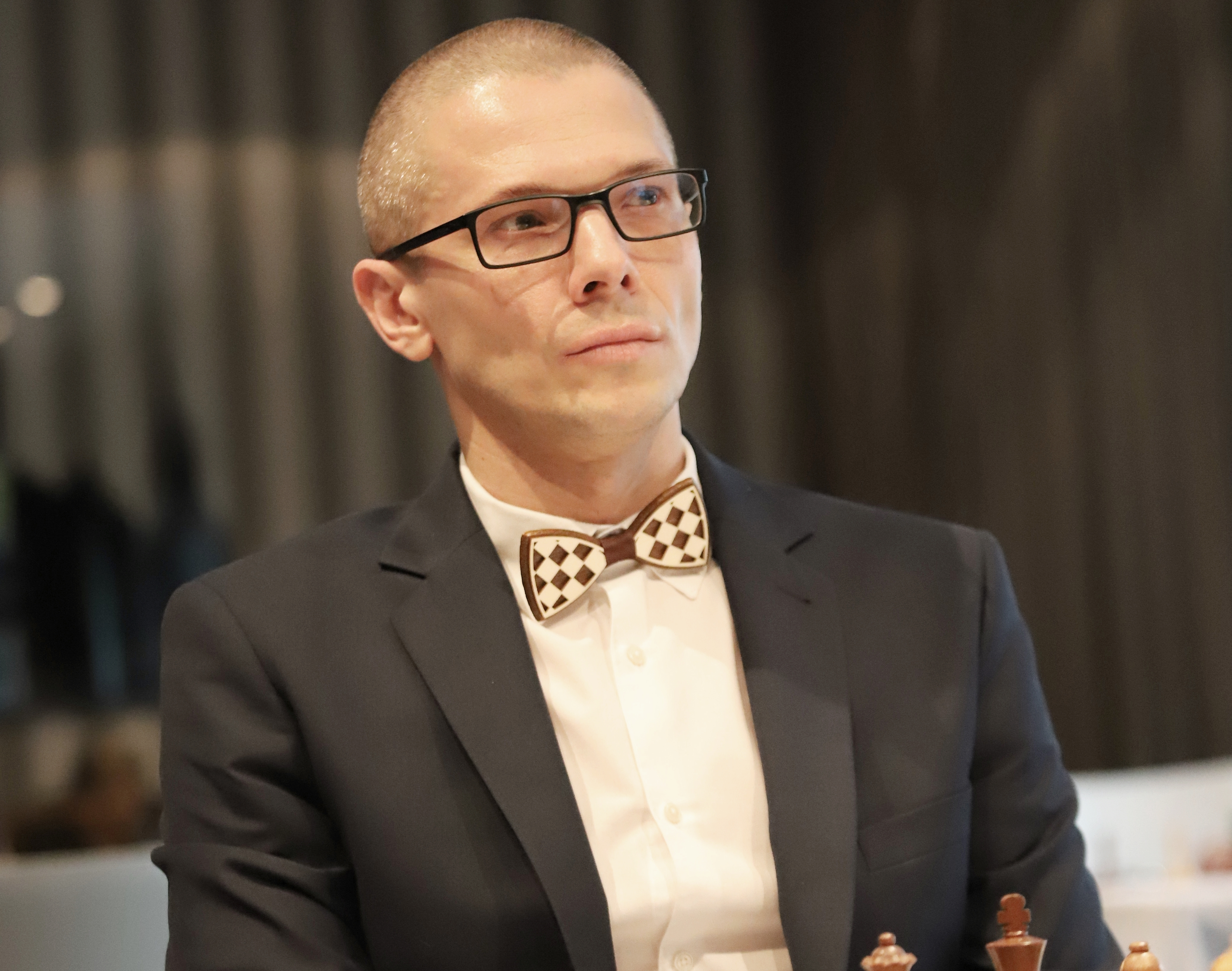
- Heberla in 2021

Personal information
- Born: 19 June 1985 (age 41) Rybnik, Poland

Chess career
- Country: Poland
- Title: Grandmaster (2006)
- FIDE rating: 2499 (July 2026)
- Peak rating: 2580 (April 2017)

Bartłomiej Heberla (born 19 June 1985) is a Polish chess player who holds the FIDE title of Grandmaster. As of January 2021, he was ranked 15th among all Polish players.

== Chess career ==
Bartłomiej Heberla was the Polish U16 champion in 2001. He is a multiple medalist of the Polish Junior Chess Championship: apart from this gold medal in 2001 (U16), he captured 1999 (U14), 2000 (U16), 2005 (U20) – three silver, and 2003 (U20) – bronze. In the 1999 and 2001 he twice won the Polish Junior Rapid Chess Championship.

In 2006, he made his debut in Polish Chess Championship final in Kraków where he took 7th place. Bartłomiej Heberla has also competed successfully in several Polish Team Chess Championships (3 team gold in 2007, 2008, 2010). In 2010, he won Polish Blitz Chess Championship in Myślibórz.

In 2008, Heberla won the traditional tournament at Banja Luka (9th edition, the last to-date) as clear first ahead of Viktor Korchnoi (previous winner in 2007), Sergey Volkov and Geetha Narayanan Gopal (ten players).

In 2010, Heberla tied for 1st–6th with Kamil Mitoń, Bojan Kurajica, Yuri Gonzalez Vidal, Lázaro Bruzón and Evgeny Gleizerov in the 4th Torneo Internacional de Ajedrez Ciudad de La Laguna.

In 2020, Heberla tied for 2nd-5th place in the Panevezys International Chess Festival with Aleksandrs Jazdanovs, Tomas Laurusas, and Karolis Juksta.

Heberla is also a FIDE Trainer (2012). In 2014 he was the Malta men's national team coach at 41st Chess Olympiad in Tromsø.

Heberla played for Poland in European Boys' U18 Team Chess Championship:

- In 2002, at fourth board in the 3rd European U18 Team Chess Championship (boys) in Balatonlelle (+3, =3, -1).
- In 2003, won team silver at fourth board in the 4th European U18 Team Chess Championship (boys) in Balatonlelle (+3, =3, -1).

Heberla played for Poland in European Team Chess Championship:

- In 2013, at second board (Poland 3) in the 19th European Team Chess Championship in Warsaw (+2, =4, -2).
