= Maxim Turov =

Russian chess grandmaster (born 1979)

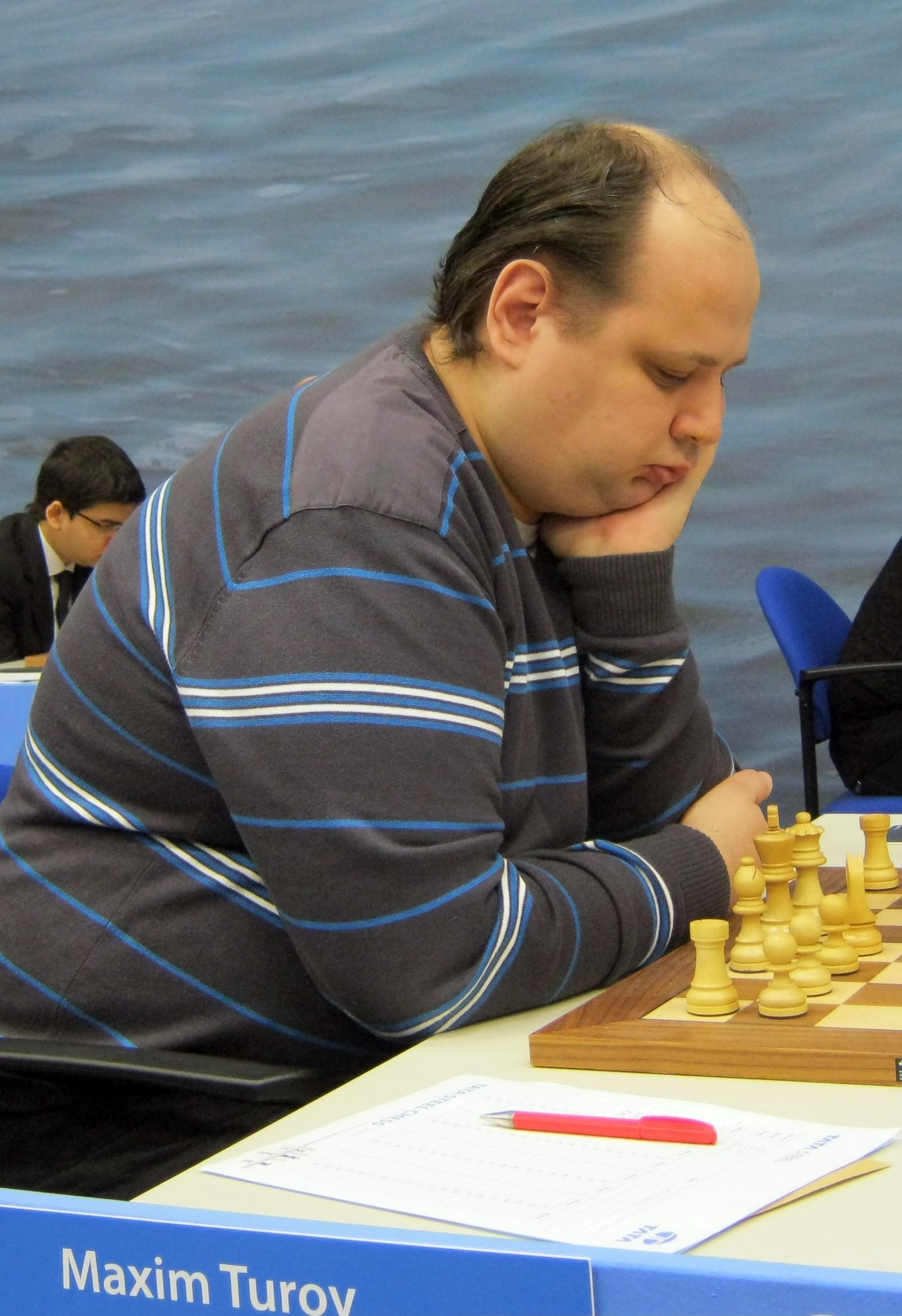

Personal information
- Born: 7 December 1979 (age 46) Gukovo, Russian SFSR, Soviet Union

Chess career
- Country: Russia
- Title: Grandmaster (1999)
- FIDE rating: 2484 (July 2026)
- Peak rating: 2667 (May 2012)
- Peak ranking: No. 86 (May 2012)

Maxim Turov (Максим Туров; born 7 December 1979) is a Russian chess player. He was awarded the title of Grandmaster by FIDE in 1999.

== Biography ==
Turov participated in the 1st Children's Chess Olympiad, held in Linares in 1993, as part of Russia "A" team, which won the gold medal. In 2005 and 2011 he won the Open Dutch Championship in Dieren.

In 2009, he tied for 1st–2nd with Alexander Lastin in the Doroshkevich Memorial, shared first with Marius Manolache in the International Chess Festival Eforie Nord, won the 9th Nordhausen Open and the 25th Faaker See Open.

In 2010, he won the Chennai Open, tied for 1st–4th with Sergei Zhigalko, Rinat Jumabayev and Vitali Golod in the 4th Georgy Agzamov Memorial in Tashkent, winning the tournament on tiebreak, tied for 1st–6th with Dmitry Kokarev, Alexey Dreev, Martyn Kravtsiv, Baskaran Adhiban and Aleksej Aleksandrov in the 2nd Orissa Open tournament in Bhubaneshwar.

In 2011 he tied for 2nd–6th with Konstantine Shanava, Mikhail Ulibin, Robert Hovhannisyan and Levon Babujian in the 4th Karen Asrian Memorial in Jermuk, tied for 2nd–7th with Julio Granda, Aleksander Delchev, Ivan Šarić, Pablo Almagro Llamas and Mihail Marin the 31st Villa de Benasque Open and tied for 2nd–7th with Deep Sengupta, Viacheslav Zakhartsov, Krisztian Szabo, Lev Gutman, Dávid Bérczes and Samuel Shankland in the ZMDI Schachfestival in Dresden.

In January 2012 Turov won the Group C of the Tata Steel Chess Tournament in Wijk aan Zee. Later that year, he won again the Agzamov Memorial, on tiebreak over Mikheil Mchedlishvili and Anton Filippov.

In 2014, he tied for 1st–3rd with Jan Werle and Yuri Solodovnichenko in the Oslo Chess International GM Tournament.

He is married to Irina Slavina Turova, also a chess player.
