= Viacheslav Zakhartsov =

Russian chess grandmaster (born 1968)

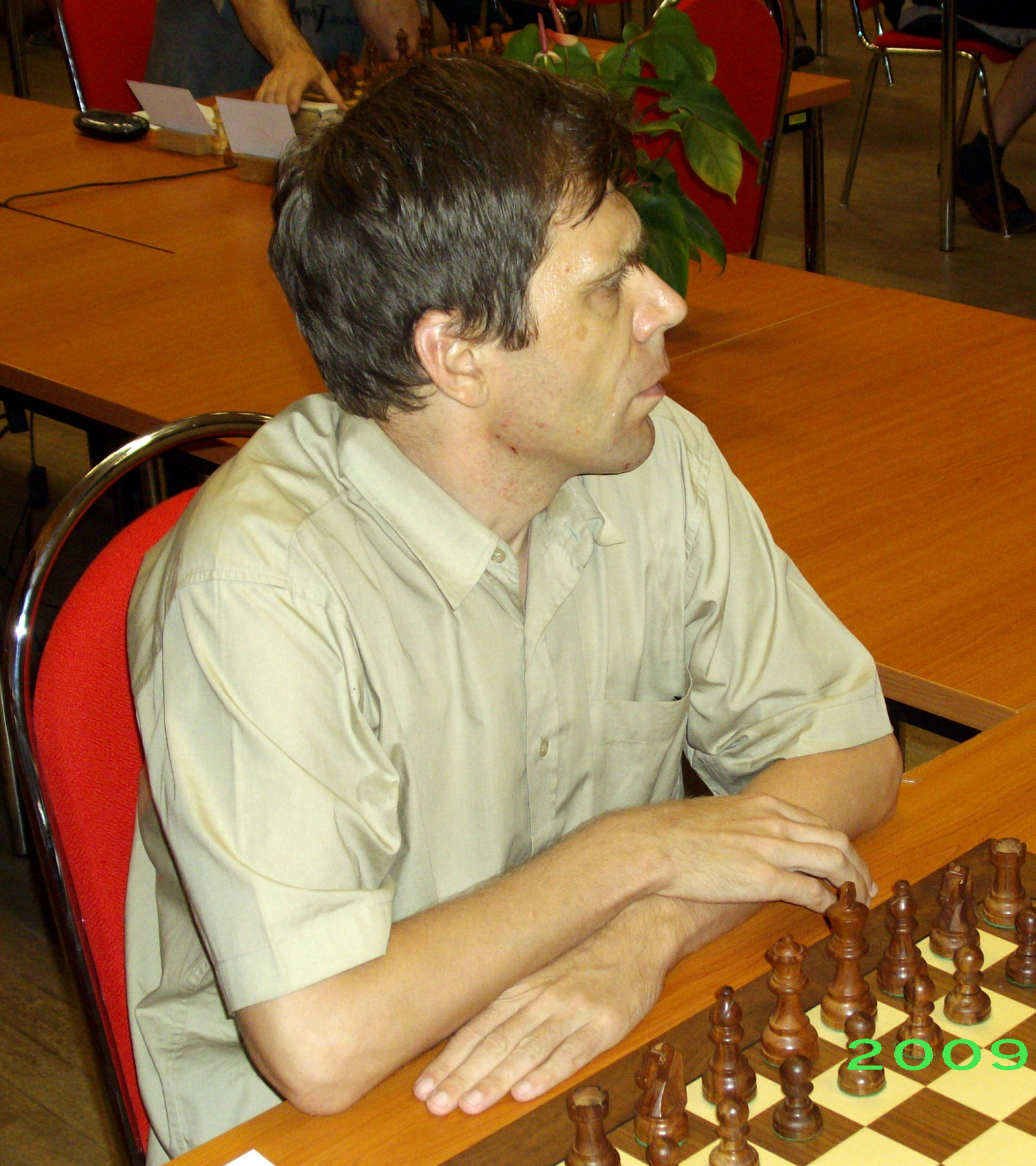

Personal information
- Born: Вячеслав Захарцов; March 30, 1968 (age 58) Omsk, Soviet Union

Chess career
- Country: Russia
- Title: Grandmaster (2007)
- FIDE rating: 2467 (July 2026)
- Peak rating: 2610 (September 2010)

Viacheslav Vladimirovich Zakhartsov (Вячеслав Владимирович Захарцов; born March 30, 1968, in Omsk) is a Russian chess Grandmaster (2007).

== Chess career ==
In 2007 he tied for 1st–9th with Alexei Fedorov, Vladimir Potkin, Aleksej Aleksandrov, Andrei Deviatkin, Alexander Evdokimov, Denis Khismatullin, Evgeny Tomashevsky and Sergei Azarov in the Aratovsky Memorial in Saratov. In 2009, tied for 1st–2nd with Marat Dzhumaev in the Cappelle-la-Grande Open. In 2011, tied for 2nd–7th with Deep Sengupta, Maxim Turov, Krisztián Szabó, Lev Gutman, Dávid Bérczes and Samuel Shankland in the ZMDI Schachfestival in Dresden. In 2014, he tied for 1st–4th in the ZMDI Open tournament in Dresden.
