= Vintilă Mihăilescu =

Romanian anthropologist (1951–2020)

Vintilă Mihăilescu (23 May 1951 – 22 March 2020) was a leading Romanian cultural anthropologist, and a professor at the National University of Political Studies and Public Administration. He was the brother of mathematician Preda Mihăilescu.

== Biography ==
He was born and grew up in the Buzești neighborhood of Bucharest. He attended School no. 11 on Șoseaua Kiseleff, and then graduated from the nearby Petru Groza High School. In 1974, he graduated from the University of Bucharest with a master's degree in psychology. Between 1974 and 1978 he worked as a researcher at the National Institute of Gerontology. Between 1979 and 1991 he was a researcher at the Center for Anthropological Researches of the Romanian Academy, where he eventually headed the department of cultural anthropology. In 1991 he became a lecturer at the Faculty of Sociology, Psychology and Pedagogy of the University of Bucharest. He obtained a six-month grant from the "Mission du Patrimoine Ethnologique de France", and he was the founding director of the Social Observatory at the University of Bucharest. In 1993, he earned a Ph.D. in psychology from that university.

Starting in 1995, Mihăilescu held a chair as a professor in the department of sociology. In 1997 he became head of the master program in anthropology at the University of Bucharest, Director of the Bucharest Rural Observatory, PHARE Rural Development Project, and director of a World Bank/CNCSU project on community development. From 1998 he regularly wrote for the cultural weekly magazine Dilema, and in 2000 he became full professor at the National University of Political Studies and Public Administration, and head of the master program in anthropology. From 2005 to 2010, he served as the Director of the Museum of the Romanian Peasant.

Mihăilescu was considered a leading cultural anthropologist in Romania. His major anthropological work was presented in Fascinația Diferenței (The Fascination of Difference), which is a synthesis of more than 20 years of practical research in a Romanian village.

In September 2018 he was diagnosed with acute myeloid leukemia. He underwent stem cell transplant at the Jean Minjoz Hospital in Besançon, France, but died there in March 2020. He was buried at the Sfântă Vineri Cemetery in Bucharest.
