= Arian González Pérez =

Cuban-Spanish chess grandmaster (born 1988)

Personal information
- Born: August 17, 1988 (age 38) Santa Clara, Cuba

Chess career
- Country: Cuba (until 2013); FIDE (2013–2021); Spain (since 2021)
- Title: Grandmaster (2018)
- Peak rating: 2500 (October 2012)

Arian González Pérez (born 1988) is a Cuban-Spanish chess player. He was awarded the title of Grandmaster (GM) by FIDE in 2018.

== Arrest and hunger-strike ==
González Pérez was born in Santa Clara, Cuba on 17 August 1988. Beside playing chess, he is also a practicing lawyer. He moved to Barcelona, Spain in 2010 and has lived in Spain since. He later moved to Burgos. In 2013, González was expelled from the Cuban chess federation for leaving the country without permission. In 2015, Cuban authorities denied him permission to visit his sick grandmother in Cuba. In 2018, González Pérez was awarded the grandmaster title by FIDE as a "player under FIDE flag", as he did not belong to any national chess federation at the time.

In July 2021, González traveled to Cuba to take care of his sick mother. While there, he took part in the 2021 Cuban protests and was arrested on 12 July in Villa Clara for "public disorder" and "incitement to the masses". On 21 July, after a week's imprisonment, he began a hunger strike aimed at the indifference of the Spanish government. Top Cuban-born grandmasters Lázaro Bruzón and Leinier Domínguez, as well as previous world champion Garry Kasparov, spoke out in support. After three days of hunger strike, González was eventually fined and released without charges. He returned to Spain where he continued to play chess.
