= Konstantine Shanava =

Georgian chess grandmaster (born 1985)

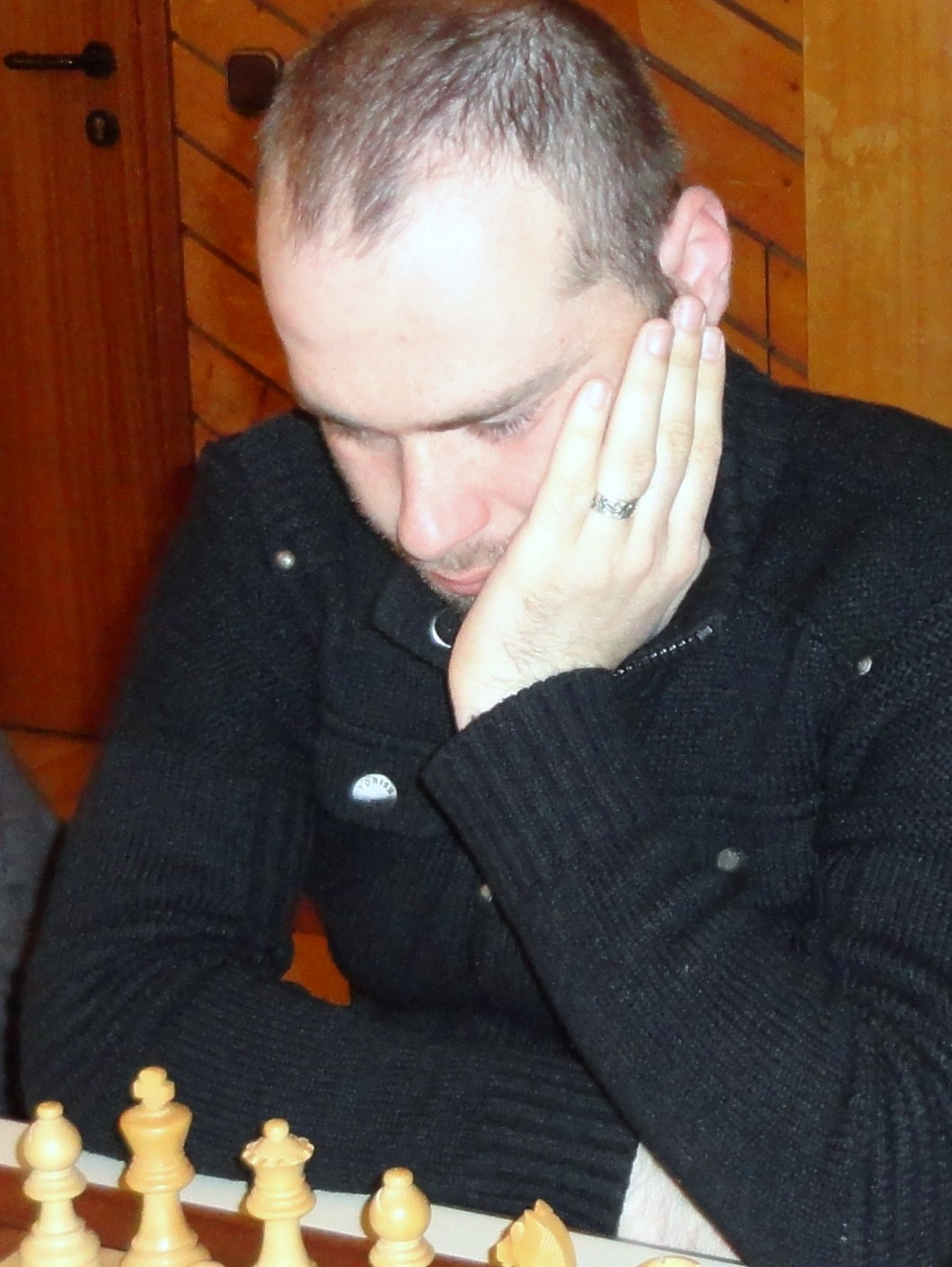
- Shanava in 2012

Personal information
- Born: May 5, 1985 (age 41)

Chess career
- Country: Georgia
- Title: Grandmaster (2006)
- FIDE rating: 2434 (September 2026)
- Peak rating: 2589 (May 2012)

Konstantine Shanava is a Georgian chess grandmaster.

== Chess career ==
He achieved the Grandmaster title in 2006, earning his norms at the:

- Summer GM A Valoz Cup in August 2005
- International Istanbul Festival in August 2005
- International Chess Festival A2 at Baku in November 2005

In March 2011, he scored 8/11 in the Fajr Open, tying for 9th place with 9 other players.

In June 2011 he tied for 2nd–6th with Maxim Turov, Mikhail Ulibin, Robert Hovhannisyan and Levon Babujian in the 4th Karen Asrian Memorial in Jermuk,
