= Tudor Vianu National College of Computer Science =

Tudor Vianu National High School of Computer Science
- Colegiul Național de Informatică Tudor Vianu
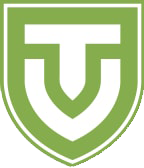

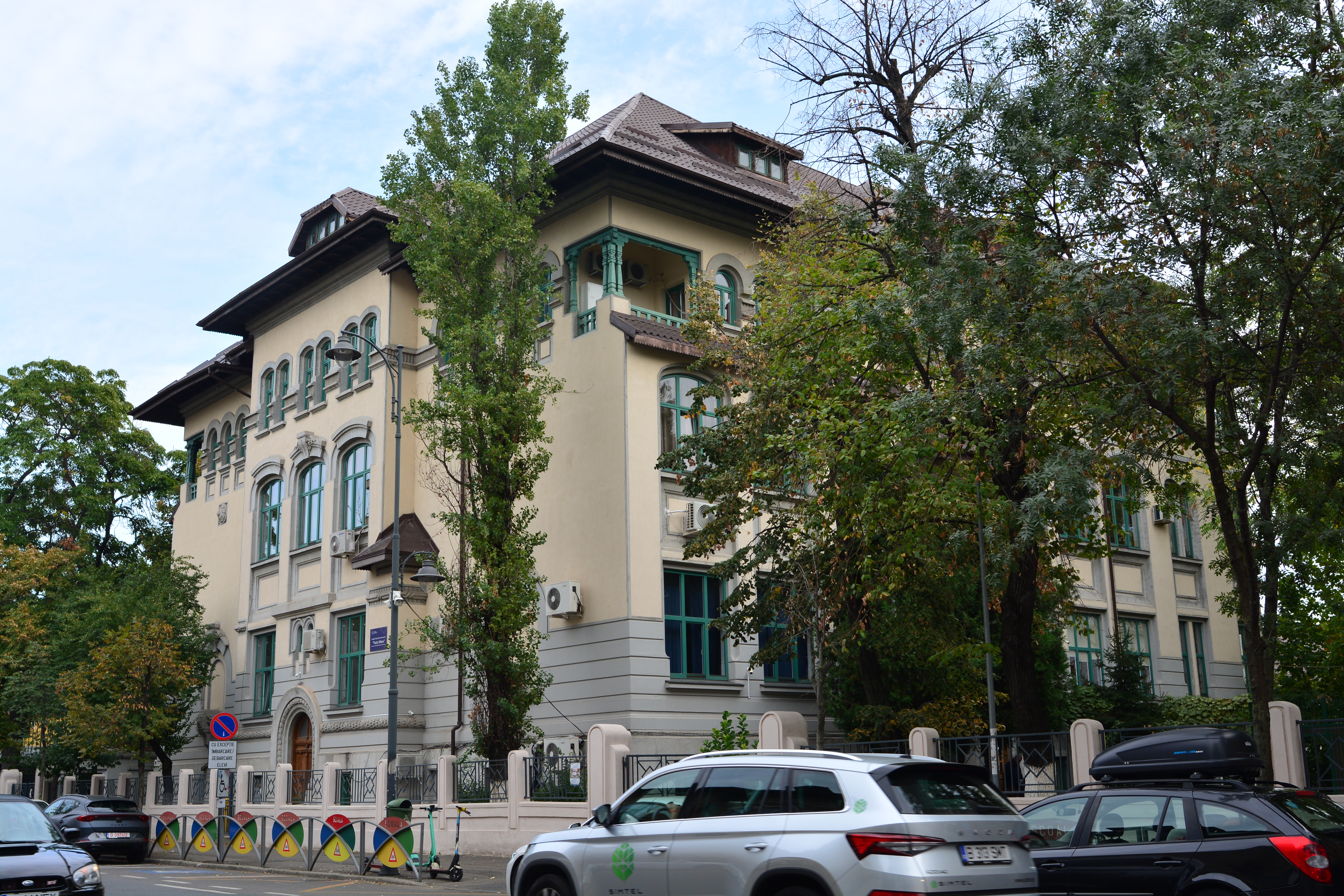
- Tudor Vianu National College of Computer Science, 2024

Location
- Strada Arhitect Ion Mincu, Nr. 10; Bucharest, 011358; Romania; 44°27′29″N 26°04′47″E

Information
- Type: Public
- Motto: "Tradiție, Competiție, Performanță" (Tradition, Competition, Performance)
- Established: 1928
- Local authority: City of Bucharest
- Principal: Claudia-Emilia Anghel
- Staff
- Gender: Mixed
- Age: 11 to 19
- Colours: Blue, Green, and Orange
- Website: portal.lbi.ro

The Tudor Vianu National High School of Computer Science (Romanian: Colegiul Național de Informatică Tudor Vianu) is a public secondary and high-school located at Arhitect Ion Mincu Street No.10, Bucharest, Romania.

The college specialises in mathematics-intensive informatics and exact sciences, preparing each year a significant number of graduates who continue their studies at prestigious universities in Romania and abroad. Its curriculum emphasizes strong foundations in mathematics, computer science, and scientific disciplines, fostering a learning environment suited especially for students with high aptitude in analytical thinking and technology.

== History ==
The history of the Tudor Vianu National College of Computer Science begins with its building situated at 10, Architect Ion Mincu Street in Bucharest. During World War II, the building was the International Red Cross and Red Crescent Movement headquarters. In 1928, the building began to be used as a high school and was first known as the "Academical High School for Girls". Due to the changes that followed after World War II, the institution decided to focus on a prospective domain: computer science. Founded in 1928, the institution received the name of "Theoretical High School for Girls".

Being placed in a high-end residential area, many nomenklatura children attended its classes, especially at the "Dr. Petru Groza", theoretical high school among others.

In September 1970, by the decision of the council of ministers, the "High School of Informatics" was established, also known as Industrial High-School for Systems of Automatic Data processing "SPAD". It started with 4 classes, 109 students, 27 per class, in parallel with the "Peter Groza High School", which continued until the termination in 1974 of the theoretical section under the name of the "High School Informatics Dr. Petru Groza" ("Liceul pentru Informatica Dr. Petru Groza").

The computer science classes were completed after September 15, based on the transfer from other high schools in Bucharest, provided that the average admission to that high school is over 9.00. Starting from 1971 the High School organized its own admission exams, where the minimum grade was usually above 9.00, due to high demand as being among the best High schools in the Country. The first promotion from the High School of Informatics graduated in 1975, bringing to the high school the first prizes at the Physics and Mathematics Olympiads by municipality and country (Valeriu Beiu, Andrei Cioara, and Liviu Popa-Simil in Physics; Daniel Mihalcea and Constantin Manoil in Mathematics). The admission rate in higher education was over 90%, qualifying the high school as one of the first high schools in Bucharest at that time. Students' life was good, learning program was intensive but relaxed, students having enough time to do extra-curriculum activities and do good with home-works. Teachers were special, well prepared, nice with students, objective with grading. The purpose of the founding was to produce the mid-level staff specialized in informatics necessary for the development of the Bucharest Computer Factory, which produced the French IRIS-50 license, the CDC-3700 computer, and the implementation of computing techniques in the country. The first generation graduated in 1975, obtaining a Baccalaureate Diploma and a Certificate of Specialist, in Computer Main frame Operation, Programmer and aid analyst, good for hiring in the computing industry.

== Period 1970–1975 ==
The 1970 series of the high school included 4 classes of 25 students each, with a program of 4 hours a day in the morning from 8:30 to 12:30. The first 2 years included an intensive specialized program, studying the internal structure of the computer, representation, organization and management of data, algorithms and logic schemes, computers, assembly languages (Asembler; Asiris), programming in Cobol, Fortran and a laboratory of digital electronics and programming of Fc15 Accounting Billing machines, etc. Starting in 1972, elements of general culture and economic and organizational sciences were introduced.

In the basement, the computer technology laboratory was developed, including terminals, card punches, accounting billing machines, office computers, which was permanently adapted by ICI care.

== Academics ==
The first promotion post-high school specialization range was the following: Economist 30%; Engineers (computer, Electronics, Mechanics) 30%; Engineer-Physicist 1%; Mathematics 6%; Physics 2%; Romanian Army Superior Officer 2%(Economics; Communication-Engineering); Representing 74% of graduates, with higher education, and Athletics Trainer 1%; Technicians in computer related activities 7%, Programmers 16%. This made about one quarter (24%) of the students fulfilled the immediate need for qualified personnel in computing activities, as initially desired by the founders, that triggered the founding for more specialization sections in many other high-schools, and continuum education after hours schools.

== Period 1975–1980 ==
In 1977, its name was changed again to "High School of Mathematics and Physics No. 1", then, in 1991 "High School of Informatics", so that in 1997 it became "Tudor Vianu National College of Informatics".

Just four years later, the institution changed its name once more and became known as the Mathematics-Physics High School no. 1 (Romanian: Liceul de matematică-fizică, nr. 1). The development of microprocessors as Intel 8080 or Zilog Z80 made possible the appearance of micro-computers as M118, HC-85, Tim-S, Cobra etc., operating inside 64 k of memory with external cassette data support or flexible disks, that came to replace the previous multi-head cartridges as ISOT 1370, etc.

== Period 1980–1990 ==
At the end of 1989, the Romanian Revolution took place, being a time of changes in computer science too. The era of Zilog Z80 or Intel 8080 was reaching its end, and a new liberalization in the computer market was predictable.

== Period 1990–2000 ==
In 1991, just two years after the Romanian Revolution, the school was renamed "High School of Computer Science" ("Liceul de Informatica"). Since 1997, the institution uses the name of a famous Romanian art critic, poet, philosopher and translator: Tudor Vianu. It is believed Vianu was chosen, even though he excelled in a different domain, due to pressures from the Romanian Communist Party, an executive of whom wanted to honour Vianu. By 1992 the PC286 diagrams were published by IBM and the era of personal/professional computers started.

== Period 2000–2024 ==
The evolution of Internet and of computers led to new changes in the high school. In 2007, due to its admission rating of 9.51, CNITV was ranked first in Bucharest. One year later, its admission rating suffered a significant drop to 9.17, and was ranked in 5th place. This drop was believed to have been caused by the Romanian Government's decision to change the entrance examination methodology. In 2009, the high school was ranked 2nd after Saint Sava National College, in 2010 it was ranked 4th, due to its 9.32 last admission rating, and in 2011 was also 4th, with 9.42 last admission rating. And after 9 years, in 2018, the high school was ranked once again the 2nd high school in the country, after Saint Sava National College. At the 2024 evaluation of all Romanian secondary schools, CNITV came in 4th place, with a score of 9.55/10.

== Recent period (2025-2026) ==
Starting with the 2026-2027 promotion, the class specializing in natural sciences has been created.

== International contests ==
The Tudor Vianu National High School of Computer Science has a long list of students that have participated in many International Science Olympiads and other contests. In the last decade only, the students won 30 gold medals, 53 silver medals and 36 bronze medals in different kind of competitions.

=== Comenius projects ===
The Tudor Vianu National High School of Computer Science has been participating in two 2 different projects in recent years. The projects were coordinated by Iulia Manicea.

=== NASA Great Moonbuggy Race ===
CNITV also took part in other Academic Competitions. In 2009 and 2010, two teams participated in the NASA Great Moonbuggy Race, a competition held in Huntsville, Alabama since 1994. The students had to build a vehicle resembling the Lunar Rover used on the Moon during the last three missions of the American Apollo program and then race it to the finish line.

Year	Team	Members	Coordinating teacher	Award
2009	Team Romaniacs	Ioana Ferariu, Anda Vlădoiu, Cătălin Munteanu-Ene, Cosmin Ion, Victor Luca Ilieșiu, Radu Iordache	Ioana Stoica	Spirit Team Award
2009	Team Moonwalker	Mădălina Alecu, Gabriela Bombărăscu, Sorina Lupu, Ramona Dorobanțu, Patricia Vîlceanu, Alexandru Fărcășanu	Ioana Stoica	Best Design Award
2010	Team Moonwalker	Mădălina Alecu, Gabriela Bombărăscu, Sorina Lupu, Ramona Dorobanțu, Patricia Vîlceanu, Cosmin Iorga	Ioana Stoica	
2010	Team Vlaicu	Ana Borlovan, Andra Filimon, Costin Muraru, Andrei Ion, Iulian Ionașcu, Liviu Felix Milorad	Ioana Stoica	Safety System Award

=== Romanian Masters of Sciences ===
The Romanian Master of Mathematics and Sciences (formerly known as the Romanian Masters in Mathematics), also referred to as RMMS is an annual international competition dedicated to students at preuniversitary level. It is organised by the Tudor Vianu National High School of Computer Science in collaboration with the Sector 1 town council.

The first Romanian Master of Mathematics took place in 2008. At the 2012 RMMS, there were 14 participating countries: Romania, Russia, Brazil, United Kingdom, United States, Serbia, Bulgaria, Italy, China, Kazakhstan, Republic of Moldova, Ukraine, Poland, and Hungary. There was no RMMS competition in 2014.

== Publications ==
The official school magazine was Fișierele Tinerilor ("Youth Files"). The articles in the magazine were mainly educational, as they covered subjects as physics, mathematics, chemistry, geography, history and economics. It also enabled pupils to showcase their artistic and literary talents through various contests or activities. Sometimes, it featured articles relating school theatre plays or interviews with pupils that had performed well in various competitions. The journal was produced by an editorial committee of student volunteers, usually with the assistance of some teachers. It was partly financed by commercial advertising and was published every four or five months. The magazine was closed in July 2009.

== Principals ==
- 1954 Anton Minciuna
- 1956 Bention Wallensten
- 1959 Teodor Burcescu
- 1960 Mihail Mihalcea
- 1962 Teodor Burcescu
- 1977 Grigore Ilie
- 1999 Silvia Moraru
- 2011 Severius Moldoveanu
- 2013 Cristinel Păun
- 2014 Corina Vinț
- 2019 Claudia Anghel

== Student body structure ==
- 5th–8th grade: 2 classes
- 9th–12th grade: 9 classes

== Notable alumni ==
=== "Dr. Petru Groza" up to 1974 ===
- Valentin Ceaușescu – Physicist
- Sergiu Klainerman – Mathematician
- Vintilă Mihăilescu – Cultural anthropologist
- Miron Mitrea – Politician and engineer
- Petre Roman – Politician and engineer
- Vladimir Socor – Political analyst

=== "Informatics" graduating since 1975 ===
- Mircea Badea – Political analyst
- Cătălin Drulă – Politician and computer engineer
- Tiberiu Georgescu – Chess master, statistician
- Cătălin Tolontan – Journalist
