= Arghyadip Das =

Indian chess player (born 1985)

Personal information
- Born: July 8, 1985 (age 41)

Chess career
- Country: India
- Title: International Master (2008)
- Peak rating: 2493 (May 2013)

Arghyadip Das is an Indian chess player.

== Chess career ==
He tied for first with Deep Sengupta in the 2010/11 Hastings Masters tournament, though was ranked as the runner-up after tiebreaks.

In March 2022, he won the BRDCA All India Rapid Rating Open with an undefeated score of 8.5/9.

In January 2024, he won the Sri Narayana Guru Trophy Rapid Rating Open with an undefeated score of 8.5/9, half a point ahead of runners-up Isha Sharma and Raghav Srivathsav Varayogi.
