= Marius Manolache =

Romanian chess grandmaster (born 1973)

Personal information
- Born: April 22, 1973 (age 53) Galați, Romania

Chess career
- Country: Romania
- Title: Grandmaster (2007)
- FIDE rating: 2421 (September 2026)
- Peak rating: 2561 (March 2012)

Marius Manolache is a Romanian chess grandmaster.

== Chess career ==
He was awarded the Grandmaster title in 2007, achieving his norms at the:

- XX Open Cidade de Ferrol in July 2005
- Romanian Chess Championship in December 2006
- European Individual Chess Championship in April 2007

In 2009, he shared first with Maxim Turov in the International Chess Festival Eforie Nord.

In April 2017, he won the bronze medal in the Romanian Chess Championship, finishing behind champion Andrei Istratescu and runner-up Constantin Lupulescu.

In 2019, he tied for 1st-3rd in the Targu Mures Open with Vlad-Cristian Jianu and Anton Teodor, getting 2nd place after tiebreaks.
