= Yge Visser =

Dutch chess grandmaster (born 1963)

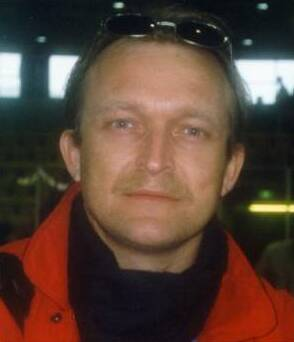

Personal information
- Born: 29 July 1963 (age 62) The Hague, Netherlands

Chess career
- Country: Netherlands
- Title: Grandmaster (2006)
- FIDE rating: 2465 (July 2026)
- Peak rating: 2533 (July 2006)

Yge Visser (born 29 July 1963, The Hague, Netherlands) is a Dutch chess Grandmaster (2006).

In 2004 he tied for 1st–4th with Yuriy Kuzubov, Friso Nijboer and John van der Wiel in the Harmonie Invitational in Groningen.
