= Illia Nyzhnyk =

Ukrainian chess grandmaster (born 1996)

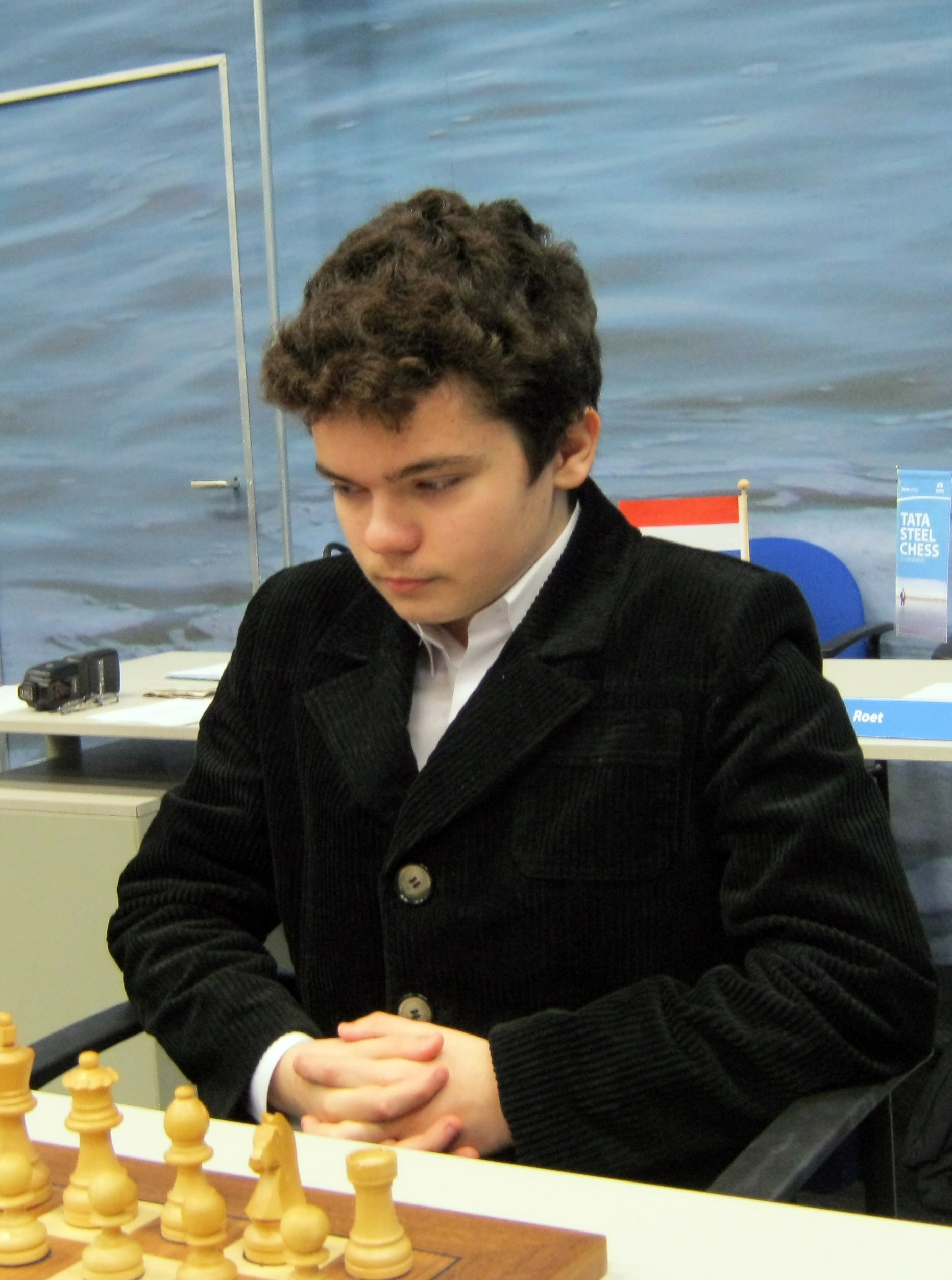
- Illia Nyzhnyk, Wijk aan Zee 2012

Personal information
- Born: Illia Ihorovych Nyzhnyk; September 27, 1996 (age 29) Vinnytsia, Ukraine

Chess career
- Country: Ukraine
- Title: Grandmaster (2011)
- FIDE rating: 2527 (July 2026)
- Peak rating: 2692 (May 2022)
- Peak ranking: No. 43 (June 2022)

Illia Ihorovych Nyzhnyk (Ukrainian: Ілля Ігорович Нижник; born September 27, 1996) is a Ukrainian chess grandmaster (2011).

== Chess career ==
He was born in Vinnytsia, Ukraine, and gained worldwide attention when he won Group B of the 2007 Moscow Open at the age of 10. He attained a nearly flawless score of 8½/9 and his performance rating was 2633, that of a Grandmaster. In January 2009, his FIDE rating was 2504, the highest rating in the world in the under-12 age group. In 2007 he won the European Youth Chess Championship for under-12. In the 2007 World Youth Chess Championship he tied for first in the under-12 age group, placing second on tie-breaks.

In April 2008, Nyzhnyk won the Nabokov Memorial in Kyiv, Ukraine, with 8½/11, and scored his first GM norm. In September 2008 he won, at the age of 12, the European Youth Chess Championship for under 16. Soon after, in December 2008, he placed 12th in the Ukrainian championship, with a performance rating of 2594, barely under the 2600 performance required for another GM norm. In December 2009, he won the Schaakfestival Groningen tournament in the Netherlands with a performance rating of 2741.

In December 2010, he was equal first (GM Dejan Bojkov won on Buchholz tie-break) at the Schaakfestival Groningen tournament, securing his final GM norm and making him, at 14 years and three months, the youngest Grandmaster in the world.

In January 2011, Nyzhnyk played in the Grandmaster Group C of the prestigious Tata Steel Chess Tournament in Wijk aan Zee, finishing in second place with 8½/13. In 2011, he tied for 1st-6th with Ivan Sokolov, Vladimir Baklan, Kamil Miton, Jon Ludvig Hammer and Yuriy Kuzubov in the MP Reykjavík Open.

In August 2019, Nyzhnyk won the U.S. Open Championship in Orlando, Florida, scoring 8/9 to finish in clear first. This triumph was capped by his last round victory over the previous year's champion, Timur Gareyev.

In 2019, Nyzhnyk won the US Thanksgiving Open tied with Peter Prohaszka and Cemil Can Ali Marandi.

In May and June 2022, Nyzhnyk was the highest-rated Ukrainian chess player.

== Personal life ==
He studied computer science at Webster University.
