= Vladimir Baklan =

Ukrainian chess grandmaster (born 1978)

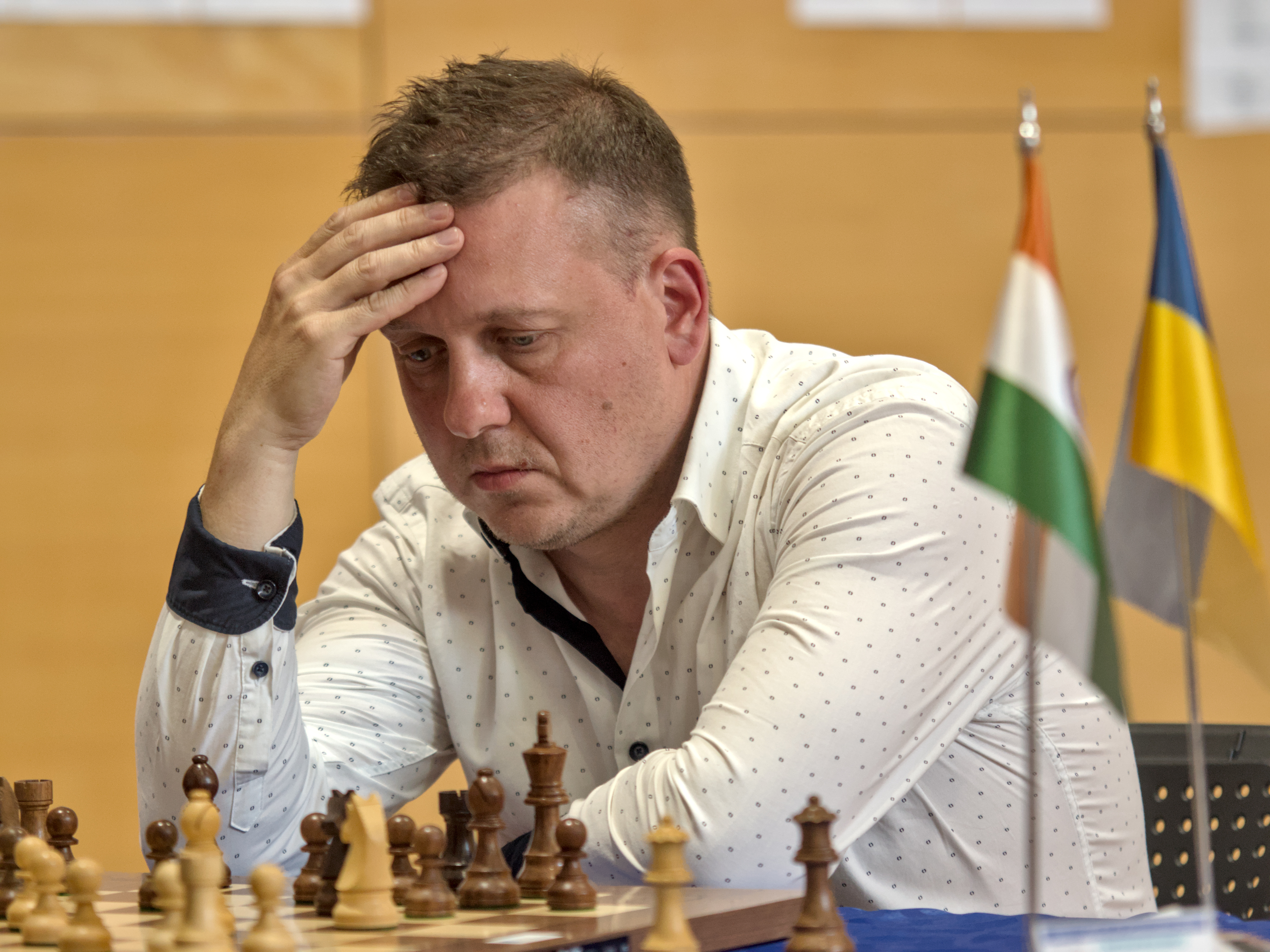

Personal information
- Born: 25 February 1978 (age 48) Kyiv, Ukrainian SSR, Soviet Union

Chess career
- Country: Ukraine
- Title: Grandmaster (1998)
- FIDE rating: 2525 (July 2026)
- Peak rating: 2656 (October 2014)
- Peak ranking: No. 65 (January 2008)

Vladimir Baklan (Ukrainian: Володимир Баклан; 25 February 1978, Soviet Union) is a Ukrainian chess grandmaster.

== Career ==
In 2000 he won with the Ukrainian team a gold medal in the 34th Chess Olympiad in Istanbul. He was a member of the gold medal-winning Ukrainian team at the 2001 World Team Chess Championship.

He won the Ukrainian Chess Championship twice, in 1997 and 1998. Among other victories, he won the Dutch Open Blitz chess Championship (2005), the Essent Open (2005) and the 7th Memorial Narciso Yepes (2006). He tied for first with Sergey Zagrebelny, Aleksander Delchev and Adam Horvath in Balaguer 2005. In 2011, he tied for 1st-6th with Ivan Sokolov, Yuriy Kuzubov, Kamil Miton, Jon Ludvig Hammer and Illia Nyzhnyk in the MP Reykjavik Open.

== Notable games ==
- Joel Benjamin vs Vladimir Baklan, FIDE WCh KO 2001, Sicilian Defense: Modern Variations (B50), 1/2-1/2
- Vladimir Baklan vs Angelos Vouldis, EuTCh 2003, Sicilian Defense: Canal Attack, Haag Gambit (B52), 1-0
- Vladimir Baklan vs Vesko Spasov, Eu Ind. Ch. 2008, Sicilian Defense: Nyezhmetdinov-Rossolimo Attack (B30), 1-0
