= Magaram Magomedov =

Russian chess grandmaster (born 1966)

Personal information
- Born: May 20, 1966 (age 60) Khuri, Republic of Dagestan

Chess career
- Country: Soviet Union (until 1991); Russia (since 1991)
- Title: Grandmaster (1998)
- FIDE rating: 2503 (October 2026)
- Peak rating: 2608 (July 2000)
- Peak ranking: No. 74 (July 2001)

Magaram Israpilovich Magomedov (born May 20, 1966) is a Russian chess grandmaster.

He played for Tajikistan at the 1994, 1996 and 1998 Olympiads and was the first player from Tajikistan to obtain the Grandmaster title.

He wrote a book called 4.Nc3 a6 - A Strange-looking Move.
