= Alexander Bagrationi (chess player) =

Ukrainian-Israeli chess grandmaster (born 1990)

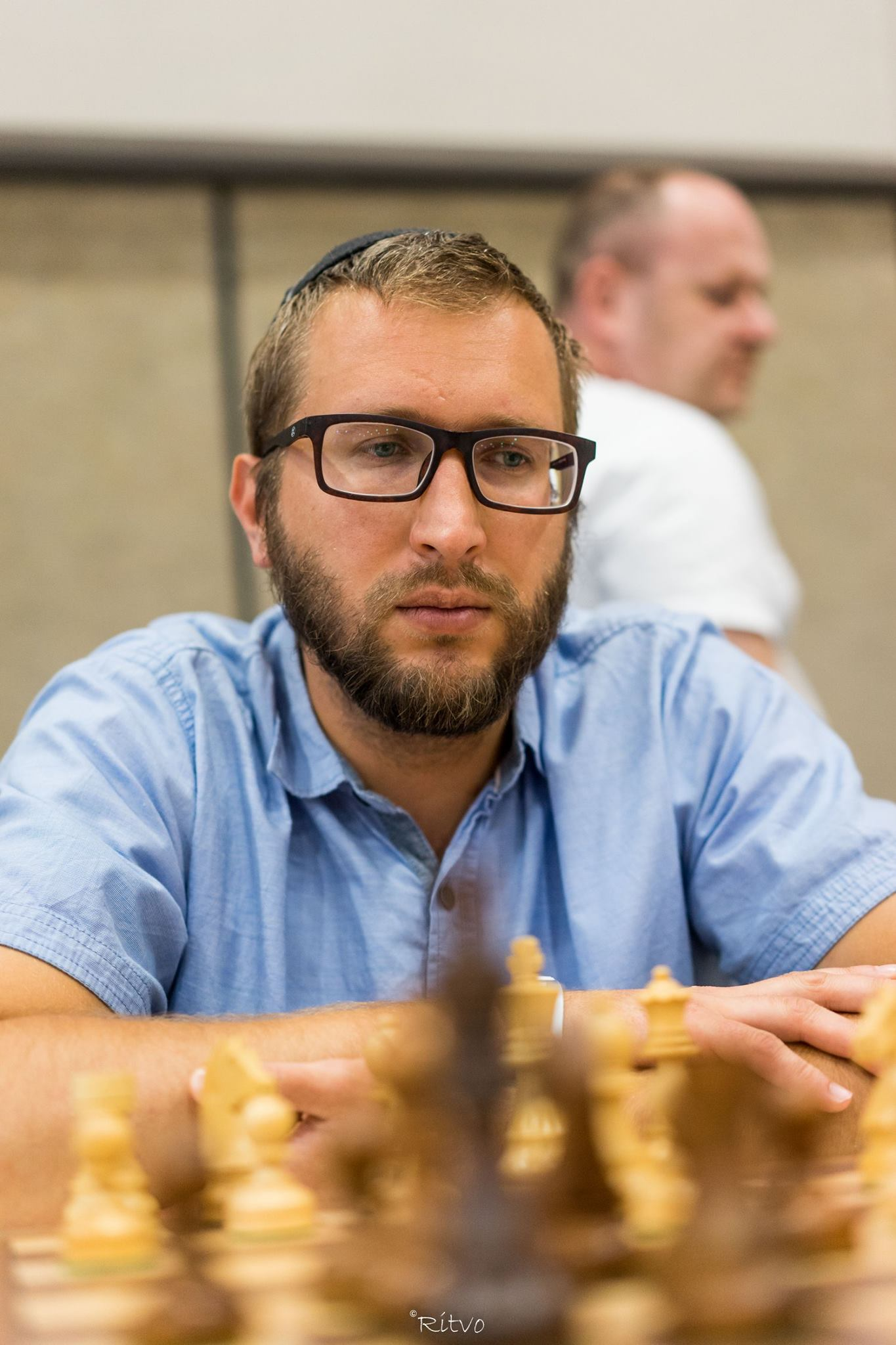

Personal information
- Native name: אלכסנדר בגרטיאוני
- Born: July 13, 1990 (age 35) Ternopil, Ukraine

Chess career
- Country: Ukraine (until 2020); Israel (since 2020)
- Title: Grandmaster (2014)
- FIDE rating: 2446 (July 2026)
- Peak rating: 2543 (March 2018)

Alexander Bagrationi (also Aaron Bagrationi; Hebrew: אלכסנדר בגרטיאוני; born 13 July 1990, in Ternopil, Ukraine) is a Ukrainian chess grandmaster who has represented Israel since 2020.

Bagrationi was born to Yakov Weizman and Nataliya (Taliya) Bagrationi, at 7.15am on 13 July 1990 in Ternopil and graduated from Ternopil National Economic University. He was awarded the International Master title in 2009. He moved to Israel in 2011, and achieved the Grandmaster title in 2014. He won the Jerusalem chess championship in 2018. He has lived in Germany since 2019.

== Notable tournaments ==
Tournament Name	Year	ELO	Points
IM Tespo Engineering(Brno CZE)	2009	2370	7.0
