= Ralf Åkesson =

Swedish chess grandmaster (born 1961)

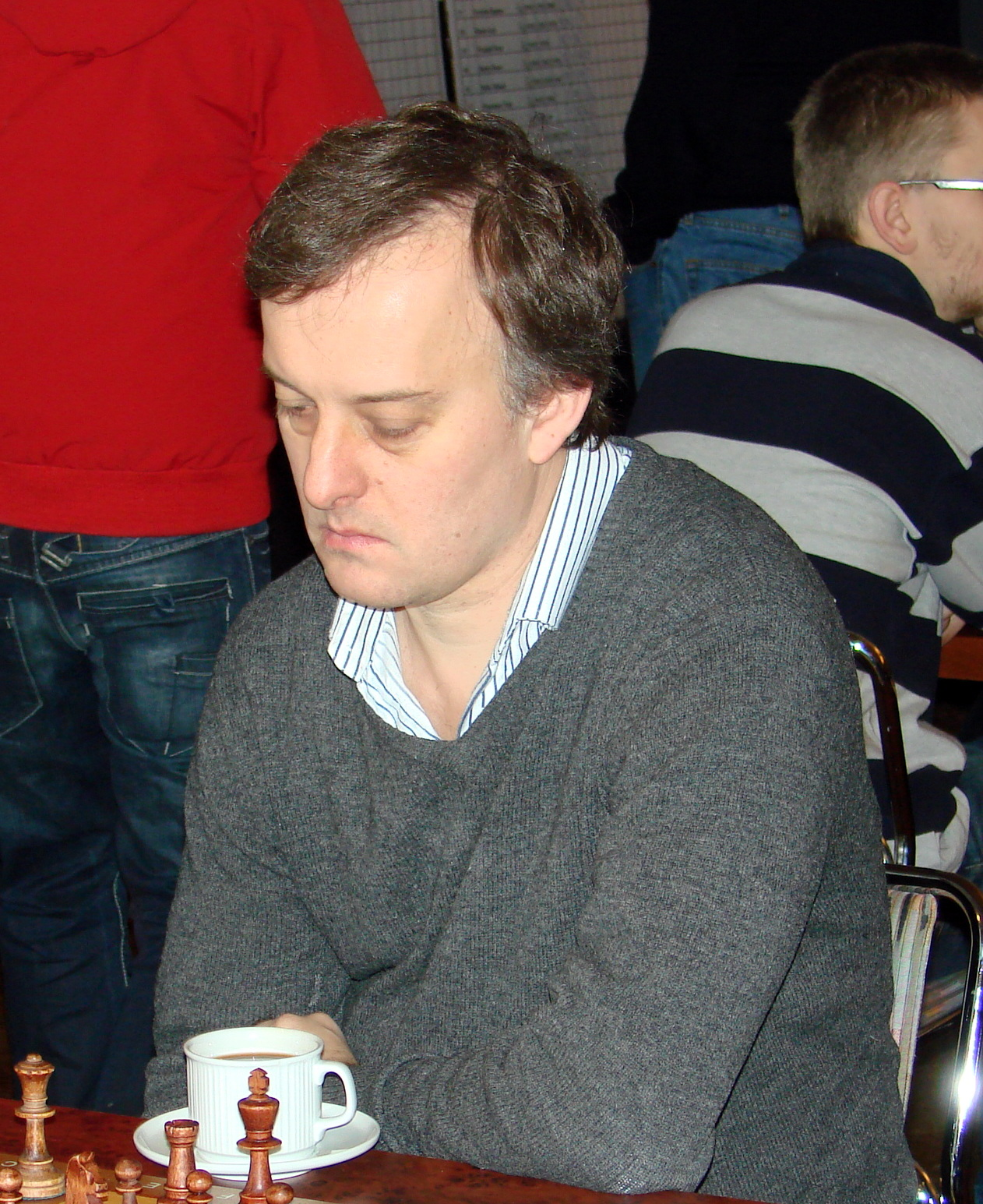
- Åkesson in Stockholm, 2009

Personal information
- Born: 8 February 1961 (age 65) Oxelösund, Sweden

Chess career
- Country: Sweden
- Title: Grandmaster (1985); Senior International Master (2004)
- FIDE rating: 2369 (March 2024)
- Peak rating: 2535 (July 1999)

Ralf Åkesson (born 8 February 1961) is a Swedish chess player. He was awarded by FIDE the titles of International Master (IM) in 1981 and Grandmaster (GM) in 1995, and by ICCF the title of Senior International Correspondence Master (SIM) in 2004.

== Biography ==
Åkesson was born in Oxelösund. He won the 1980/1981 European Junior Chess Championship (U20) in Groningen. In 1985 and 1999 he won the Swedish Chess Championship. Tournament victories include the Grandmaster Group in Gausdal in 2001, 2003/04 Rilton Cup in Stockholm, GM B Group of the Gausdal Classics tournament and the Open of the Marx György Memorial in Paks in 2005. He tied for first place with Stanislav Novikov, Batuhan Dastan, Hagen Poetsch, Alexey Kim, Jonathan Hawkins and Kacper Drozdowski in the 18th Vienna Open in 2013. In 2015, Åkesson won the Malmö Open, which consists of four rounds of rapid chess and three of standard chess, with a score of 6.5/7. In 2015, he tied 2nd-5th place with Drazen Dragicevic, Yuri Solodovnichenko, and Erik Blomqvist in the Elite Hotels Open.

He took part in three Chess Olympiads for the Swedish national team (1996, 1998 and 2000) with altogether 15 points in 28 games (+9, =12, −7). He achieved his highest rating, 2535, in July 1999.

In Sweden, he plays for the club Västerås SK and for the club Södra SS, and in Belgium for Leuven Centraal.
