= Imre Balog =

Hungarian chess grandmaster (born 1991)

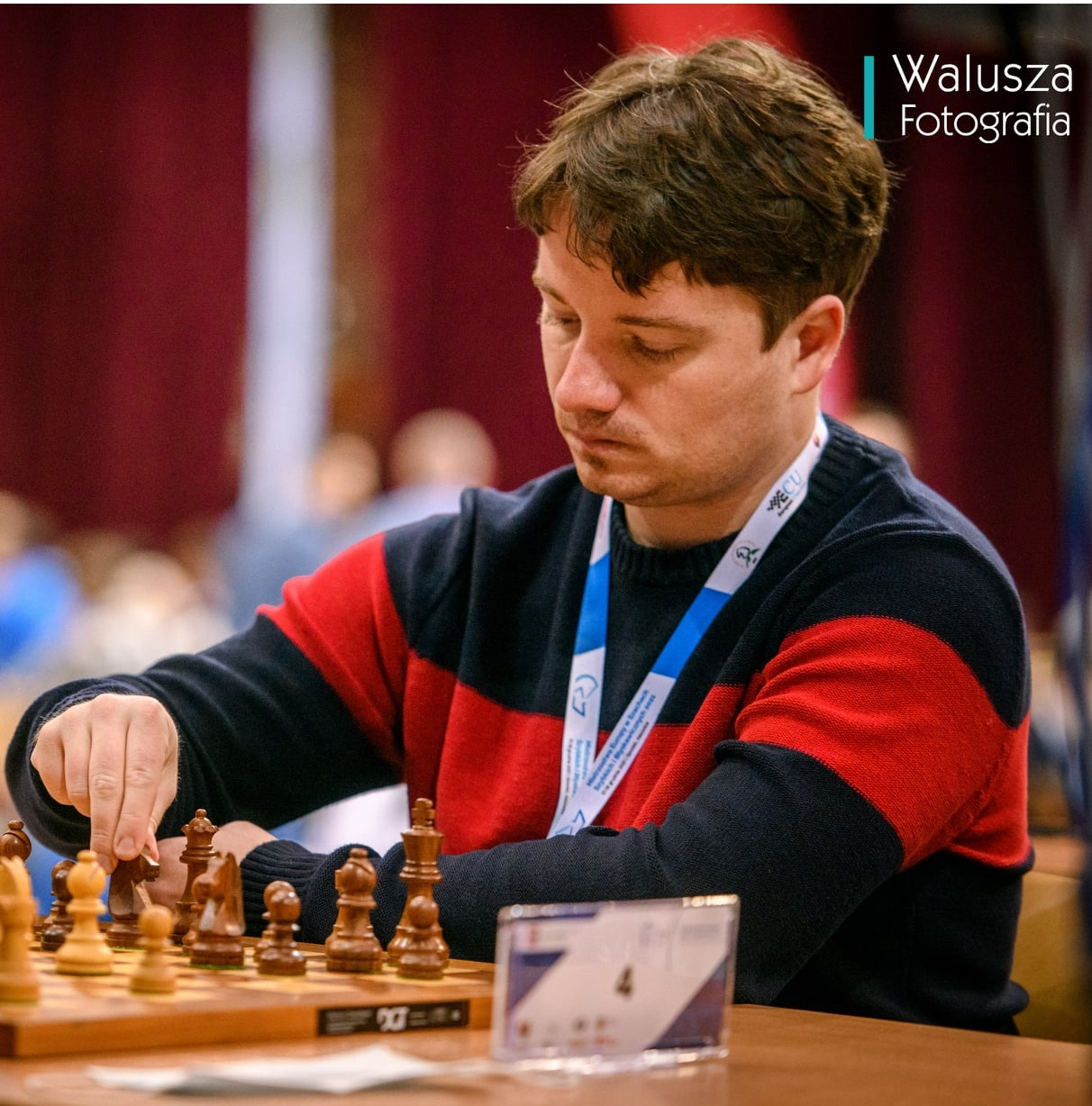
- Balog in 2021

Personal information
- Born: October 28, 1991 (age 34) Békéscsaba, Hungary

Chess career
- Country: Hungary
- Title: Grandmaster (2011)
- FIDE rating: 2575 (October 2026)
- Peak rating: 2627 (June 2024)

Imre Balog (born October 28, 1991) is a Hungarian chess grandmaster. Balog won the Arad Open in 2011, and won it for a second time in 2012. He earned his International Master title in 2007 and gained his grandmaster norms in 2010 and was awarded the grandmaster title in early 2011.
