= Alexey Kim =

South Korean chess grandmaster (born 1986)

Personal information
- Born: Alexey Eduardovich Kim; April 5, 1986 (age 40) Tashkent, Uzbek SSR, USSR

Chess career
- Country: Russia (until 2006); South Korea (since 2006)
- Title: Grandmaster (2004)
- FIDE rating: 2465 (July 2026)
- Peak rating: 2488 (September 2013)

Alexey Eduardovich Kim (born April 5, 1986) is a Soviet-born South Korean chess player. He is the only South Korean to hold the FIDE title of Grandmaster.

== Biography ==
A third-generation ethnic Korean, Kim was born on April 5, 1986, in Tashkent, Uzbekistan, in the Soviet Union. He learned chess from his grandfather, Nikolay Vladimirovich Kim, at four years old. When he was eleven, he won the Moscow Junior Championship. Kim became a FIDE master in 2000, an international master in 2001, and a grandmaster in 2004. In 2006, he paid the required fee to FIDE (chess's international governing body) to switch his national federation to South Korea, in keeping with his grandfather's wishes. Kim played on the South Korean team in the 2008 Chess Olympiad. In 2013, he shared first place with Stanislav Novikov, Batuhan Daştan, Hagen Poetsch, Ralf Åkesson, Jonathan Hawkins and Kacper Drozdowski in the 18th Vienna Chess Open.
