= Tiberiu Georgescu =

Romanian chess grandmaster (born 1991)

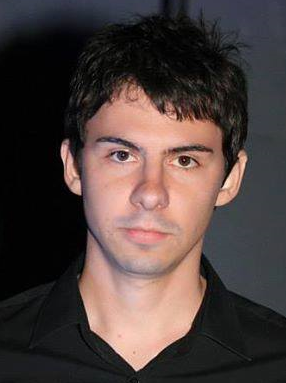
- Georgescu in 2016

Personal information
- Born: February 8, 1991 (age 35)

Chess career
- Country: Romania
- Title: Grandmaster (2015)
- FIDE rating: 2457 (July 2026)
- Peak rating: 2510 (January 2019)

Tiberiu-Marian Georgescu (born 8 February 1991) is a Romanian chess grandmaster. He is playing for Vados Arad Chess Club and he is a member of Romanian National Team. Besides chess, he is active in IT field.

Georgescu studied at the Tudor Vianu National College of Computer Science in Bucharest. He has a PhD in Economic Informatics and is one of the founders of Chess Coders company.

He has won numerous national and international tournaments. His most important achievements are:

- Silver medal at the 2019 Romanian National Championships
- Romanian National Chess Champion in 2018
- Bronze Medal at the 2016 Romanian National Championship
