= Yuriy Kuzubov =

Ukrainian chess grandmaster (born 1990)

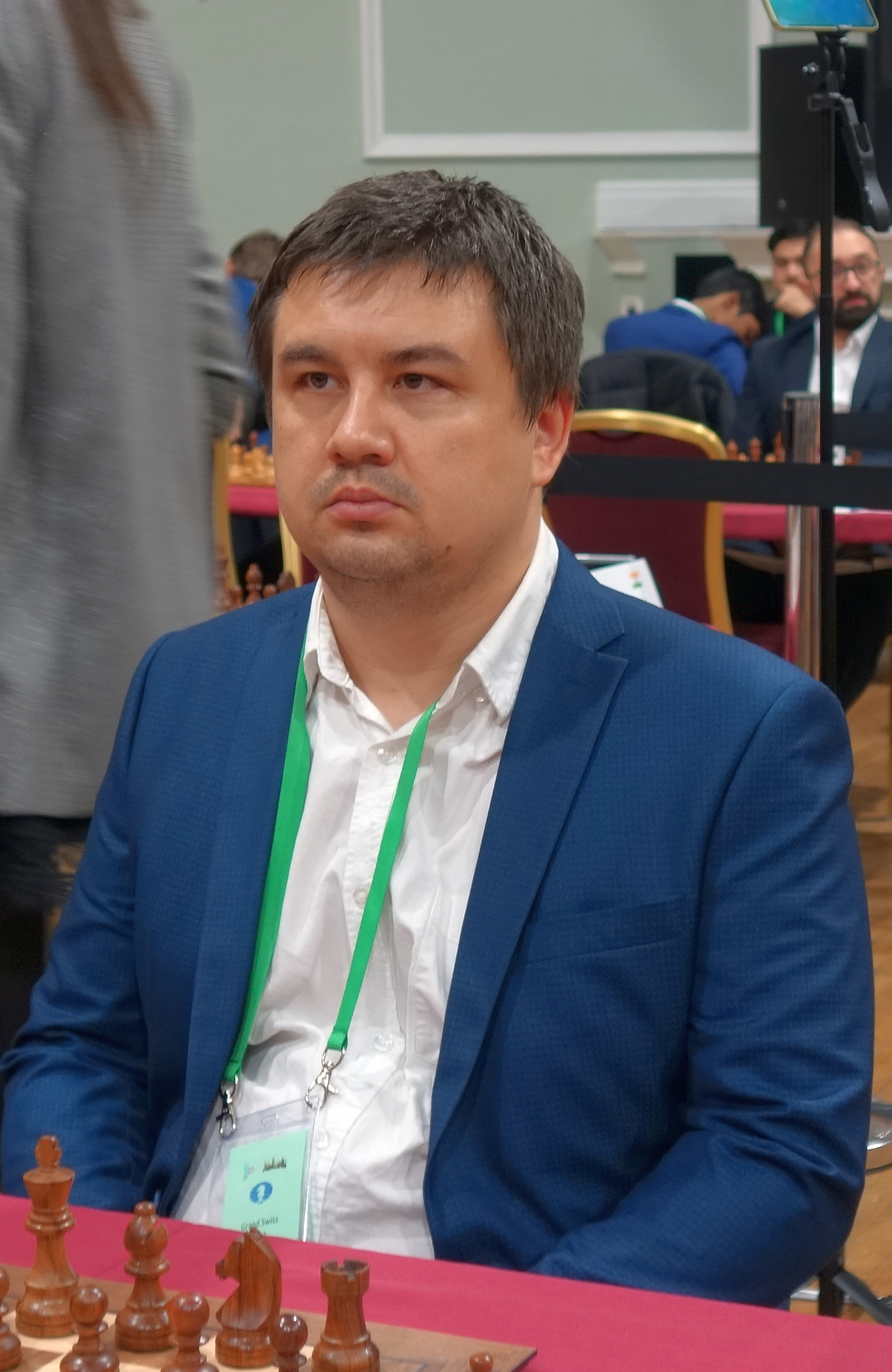
- Kuzubov in 2023

Personal information
- Born: January 26, 1990 (age 36) Sychyovka, Smolensk Oblast, Russian SFSR, Soviet Union

Chess career
- Country: Ukraine
- Title: Grandmaster (2005)
- FIDE rating: 2603 (July 2026)
- Peak rating: 2699 (December 2017)
- Peak ranking: No. 44 (December 2017)

Yuriy Alexandrovich Kuzubov (Ukrainian: Юрій Кузубов; his first name is sometimes spelled "Yuri" or "Yury"; born 26 January 1990 in Sychyovka, Smolensk Oblast) is a Ukrainian chess grandmaster and Ukrainian champion of 2014. He completed his final grandmaster norm at the age of 14 years, 7 months, 12 days in 2004.

== Career ==
Kuzubov won the Ukrainian Under-12 championship in 2001 and in the same year he finished equal first in the European Under-12 championship in Heraklion, placing fourth on additional criteria. In 2002 he won again the Ukrainian Under-12 championship and won the Chigorin Memorial B tournament in Saint Petersburg. Kuzubov was a member of the Ukrainian team that won the silver medal in the Under-16 Chess Olympiads of 2002 and 2003.

In 2004 he won the Harmonie Invitational round-robin tournament in Groningen on tiebreak over Yge Visser, Friso Nijboer and John van der Wiel. In the same year he also won the Ukrainian U14 championship, came second in the World U14 championship in Heraklion, and tied for first with Ildar Khairullin and Sergei Zhigalko, placing third on tiebreak, in the World's Youth Stars tournament in Kirishi. Kuzubov played for the Ukrainian team on the reserve board in the 2005 European Team Chess Championship.

In 2009, he won the SPICE Cup A Group, a category 16 round-robin tournament held in Lubbock, Texas, after a blitz playoff with Dmitry Andreikin and Rauf Mamedov.

In 2010 Kuzubov tied for first, finishing second on tiebreak, at the Reykjavik Open. In 2011, tied for 1st–5th with Alexander Areshchenko, Parimarjan Negi, Markus Ragger and Ni Hua in the 9th Parsvnath Open Tournament and won the MP Reykjavik Open on tiebreak over Ivan Sokolov, Vladimir Baklan, Kamil Miton, Jon Ludvig Hammer and Illia Nyzhnyk, after all players finished on 7/9. In August 2014 he won the Abu Dhabi Masters tournament on tiebreak over Tigran L. Petrosian.

Kuzubov won the Ukrainian Chess Championship of 2014 in Lviv.

== Notable game ==
In the game below, played at the 73rd Ukrainian Chess Championship in 2004, Kuzubov, playing black, defeats fellow Ukrainian Grandmaster Sergey Karjakin.

Karjakin vs. Kuzubov, Kharkiv 2004

Position: g1 white king, e1 white rook, h2 white pawn, g3 white pawn, d3 black knight, f4 white queen, c4 white pawn, a4 white pawn, d5 white knight, b5 white bishop, g6 black bishop, e6 black pawn, h7 black pawn, g7 black bishop, h8 black king, d8 black queen, c8 black rook

Final position

1. e4 c5 2. Nf3 Nc6 3. d4 cxd4 4. Nxd4 Nf6 5. Nc3 e5 6. Ndb5 d6 7. Bg5 a6 8. Na3 b5 9. Bxf6 gxf6 10. Nd5 f5 11. Bd3 Be6 12. c3 Bg7 13. Nxb5 axb5 14. Bxb5 Bd7 15. exf5 O-O 16. O-O Rb8 17. a4 Re8 18. Qf3 e4 19. Qg3 Kh8 20. Qxd6 Be5 21. Qc5 Rc8 22. Qe3 Bxf5 23. Rad1 Re6 24. g3 Rd6 25. c4 Bxb2 26. Rd2 Bg7 27. f3 exf3 28. Qxf3 Bg6 29. Qf4 Ne5 30. Re2 Re6 31. Rfe1 Nd3 32. Rxe6 fxe6 0-1

== See also ==
- Chess prodigy
