= Bojan Kurajica =

Croatian-Bosnian chess grandmaster (born 1947)

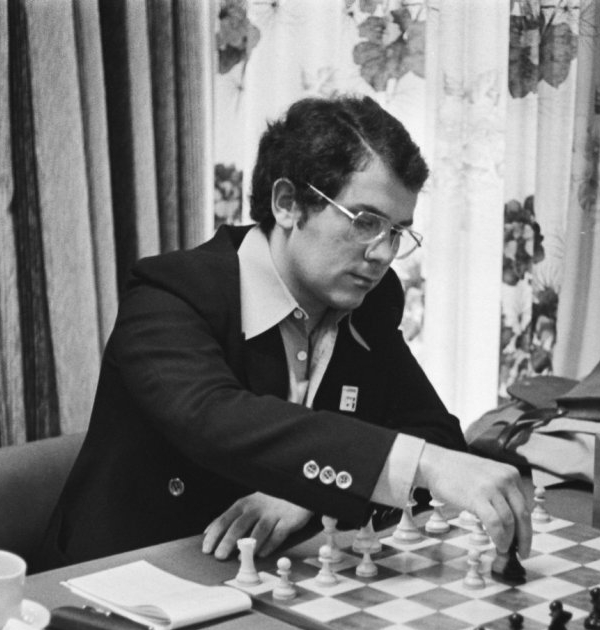
- Kurajica (Hoogovens, 1977)

Personal information
- Born: 15 November 1947 (age 78) Ljubljana, PR Slovenia, Yugoslavia

Chess career
- Country: Yugoslavia → Bosnia and Herzegovina
- Title: Grandmaster (1974)
- Peak rating: 2595 (July 1995)
- Peak ranking: No. 41 (July 1982)

Bojan Kurajica (born 15 November 1947) is a Croatian-Bosnian chess grandmaster (GM).

== Biography ==
Kurajica grew up in Split. He earned the International Master (IM) title in 1965 by winning the World Junior Championship. He moved to Zagreb in 1966 to study Italian and English at the Faculty of Philosophy, graduating in 1972.

Kurajica was awarded the GM title in 1974. He played chess in Zagreb until 1979, when he relocated to Sarajevo in order to play for ŠK Bosna. He played for Yugoslavia in Chess Olympiads at Valletta 1980 (won team bronze medal) and Thessaloniki 1984. One of his notable tournament successes was joint 3rd/4th place (together with Mikhail Tal whom he beat in their individual game) at the 1976 Wijk aan Zee (Fridrik Olafsson and Ljubomir Ljubojević won). In 1979, Kurajica shared the win at the traditional Bosna tournament in Sarajevo. In 1981, he won the strong Lugano Open (first with best tie-break score). In 1991, Kurajica broke the Guinness World record for playing a simultaneous game on the largest numbers of boards up until that moment. After the collapse of Yugoslavia, he represented Bosnia and Herzegovina ten times between 1992 and 2012 (won team silver medal at Moscow 1994), in total 12 Olympiad appearances.

In December 2005, Kurajica won the 13th Salona GM Invitation Tournament in Solin as clear first. In the same year Kurajica was awarded the title of FIDE Trainer. As of 2006, he shared his residence between Sarajevo and Santa Cruz de Tenerife.
