= Farrukh Amonatov =

Tajikistani chess grandmaster (born 1978)

Personal information
- Born: 13 April 1978 (age 48) Dushanbe, Tajik SSR, Soviet Union

Chess career
- Country: Tajikistan
- Title: Grandmaster (2002)
- FIDE rating: 2598 (July 2026)
- Peak rating: 2650 (July 2008)
- Peak ranking: No. 64 (January 2008)

Farrukh Amonatov (Tajik: Фаррух Амонатов; born 13 April 1978) is a Tajikistani chess grandmaster. Along with Magaram Magomedov, he is one of only two Grandmasters of Tajikistan. Amonatov is also the winner of many international tournaments and recently won the Mumbai Mayors Cup 2019. Despite living and training in Moscow, he represents Tajikistan in international tournaments. Amonatov is the official coach of the Russian Juniors chess team and conducts chess camps with talented juniors from all over the world.

== Career ==
Amonatov was the Asian under-16 champion in 1992. He won the inaugural Moscow Open in 2005. Later that year Amonatov competed in the FIDE World Cup, where he knocked out Michał Krasenkow in the first round and was then eliminated in the second by Magnus Carlsen. In 2007, he qualified for the Superfinal of the Russian Chess Championship and finished 10th. In 2008 Amonatov tied for first place with Anton Filippov and Vitaly Tseshkovsky in the 2nd Georgy Agzamov Memorial in Tashkent, winning the tournament on tiebreak. He took part in the 2009 FIDE World Cup, where he reached the second round, in which he lost to the eventual winner, Boris Gelfand. In 2015 Amonatov tied for 1st–3rd with Rinat Jumabayev and Petr Kostenko at the 4th Central Asia Chess Cup in Almaty, finishing second on a tiebreak. The following year, Amonatov won for the second time the Agzamov Memorial (on tiebreak from Rauf Mamedov), and also won the Eurasian Blitz Cup of the President of Kazakhstan, held in Almaty, edging out on tiebreak (number of wins) Ian Nepomniachtchi.
