= Batuhan Daştan =

Turkish chess grandmaster (born 1997)

Personal information
- Born: Muhammed Batuhan Daştan; 7 August 1997 (age 29) Bursa, Turkey

Chess career
- Country: Turkey
- Title: Grandmaster (2016)
- FIDE rating: 2533 (October 2026)
- Peak rating: 2582 (August 2019)

Muhammed Batuhan Daştan (born 7 August 1997, Bursa) is a Turkish chess grandmaster.

Daştan earned FIDE titles as FIDE Master (FM) in 2012, International Master (IM) in 2013 and Grandmaster (GM) in 2016. He is the tenth player to become a grandmaster in Turkish chess history.
