= Vladimir Belov (chess player) =

Russian chess grandmaster and coach (born 1984)

Personal information
- Born: August 6, 1984 (age 41) Kirzhach, Vladimir Oblast, Russian SFSR, Soviet Union

Chess career
- Country: Russia
- Title: Grandmaster (2003)
- Peak rating: 2641 (November 2010)
- Peak ranking: No. 69 (October 2008)

Vladimir Sergeevich Belov (born 6 August 1984 in Kirzhach, Vladimir Oblast, Russian SFSR, Soviet Union) is a Russian chess grandmaster, coach, and author. He currently resides in Novi Sad, Serbia.

== Chess career ==
Belov began studying chess under coach Yuri Golub and later trained with grandmaster Sergey Shipov. He became an International Master in 2000 and was awarded the title of Grandmaster in 2003.

In 2004–2005, he achieved strong results at international tournaments in Kavala, Thessaloniki, and Hastings. In 2005, he won the North Sea Cup in Esbjerg. In 2007, Belov became the Moscow Chess Champion. He won the Master Open at the Biel Chess Festival in 2008 and also claimed first place at the Chigorin Memorial in Saint Petersburg the same year.

He represented the Cheboksary-based team Elara, which won the bronze medal at the 2007 Russian Team Championship. He worked as a second for Dmitry Jakovenko at the Nanjing Super GM tournament in 2009 and for Ruslan Ponomariov at a tournament in Saratov in 2011. In 2006, he served as an official commentator for the World Chess Championship match between Vladimir Kramnik and Veselin Topalov in Elista.

== Coaching career ==
Belov graduated in 2005 from the Russian State University of Physical Education, Sports, and Tourism with a degree in chess coaching. In 2006, he began working professionally as a coach and joined the training staff of the Russian women's national team.

He has coached numerous accomplished players, including:

- Aleksandra Goryachkina: Multiple-time Russian women's champion and two-time challenger for the Women's World Championship (2020, 2023), as well as medalist at Chess Olympiads and European Team Championships.
- Alexey Sarana: Became a grandmaster in 2016, won the 2019 Russian Higher League, and became European Champion in 2023. That year, he played top board for the Serbian national team.
- Nazi Paikidze: Winner of the Moscow Women's Championship and Russian Higher League, and medalist at the Russian Superfinal and World Junior Championship. Later, she became a two-time U.S. Women's Champion.
- David Paravyan, Anton Smirnov, Maxim Lugovskoy: Grandmasters with significant international achievements.

He has also worked with Polina Shuvalova, Bibisara Assaubayeva, Dinara Saduakassova, Olga Girya, Anastasia Bodnaruk, as well as youth players such as Ilya Makoveev and Ivan Yeletsky.

== Online presence ==
Since 2020, Belov has run the "Study Chess" YouTube channel, where he publishes instructional videos, game analysis, and commentary for players of all levels. The channel is popular among Russian-speaking chess audiences.

He also maintains his official website study-chess.ru, which offers courses, articles, and training materials.
