= Lev Gutman =

Chess player

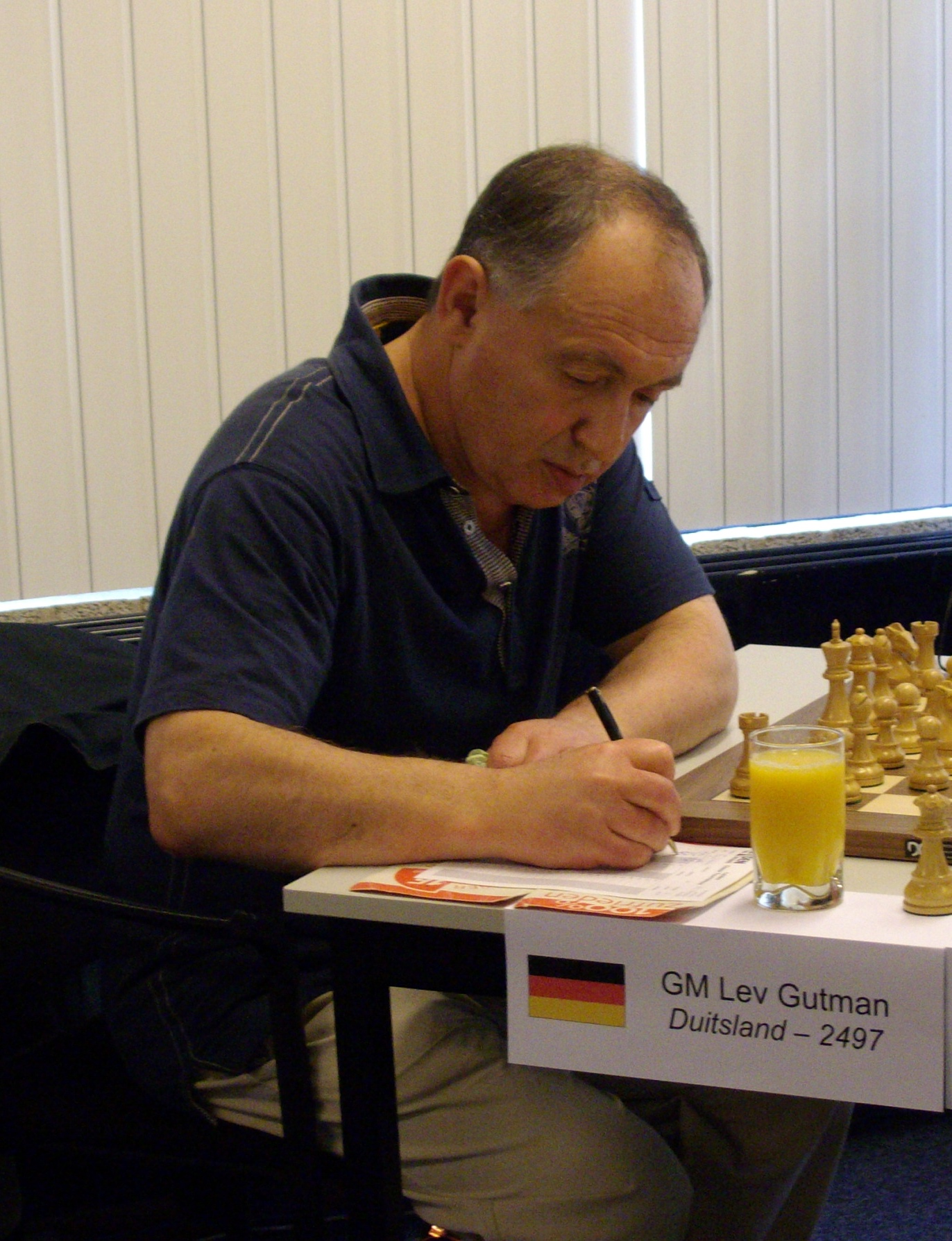
- Leiden 2008

Personal information
- Born: 26 September 1945 (age 80) Riga, Latvian SSR, Soviet Union

Chess career
- Country: Germany
- Title: Grandmaster (1986)
- Peak rating: 2547 (October 2000)

Lev Gutman (Hebrew: לב גוטמן, Latvian: Ļevs Gutmans; born 26 September 1945) is a Latvian, Israeli and German chess grandmaster.

== Chess career ==
At the beginning of his career, Gutman tied for 11–12th at Riga 1967 (LAT-ch; Jānis Klovāns won), which was the first of many appearances in the Latvian championship; he tied for 5–7th place in 1969, tied for 4–5th in 1971, won in 1972, tied for 7–8th in 1973, took 3rd in 1974, took 4th in 1975, took 2nd in 1976, tied for 2nd–3rd in 1977, tied for 7–9th in 1978, tied for 4–5th in 1979.

In 1972 he won, equal with Alvis Vītoliņš and Šmits, the Riga Chess Championship. In 1974, he tied for 6–7th in Pärnu. In 1975, he tied for 6–8th in Riga. In 1976, he tied for 7–9th in Riga. In 1977, he tied for 6–7th in Homel. In 1978, he tied for 4–7th in Vladivostok. In 1978, he won in Haapsalu.

Gutman emigrated from the Soviet Union to Israel in 1980, later moving to Germany.

A former second to Viktor Korchnoi, he is known as an expert on opening theory.

He played for Israel in two Chess Olympiads.

- In 1982, at third board in the 25th Chess Olympiad in Lucerne (+4 –4 =2);
- In 1984, at third board in the 26th Chess Olympiad in Thessaloniki (+4 –3 =3).

In 1984, he won in Grindavík. In 1985, he won in Beersheba. In 1986, he won in Wuppertal. In 1986, he tied for 1st–4th with Viktor Korchnoi (winner on tie-break), Nigel Short, and James Plaskett in the strong Lugano Open. In 1987, Gutman was clear first at the traditional Biel Open. He also lost to Judit Polgar in Brussels in that year, making him the first GM she beat.

He was awarded the Grandmaster title in 1986.

In September 2015, on the occasion of the 70th birthday of Lev Gutman, the chessclub Schachverein Lingen 1959 organised a tournament, the Lev Gutman 70 GM-Turnier in Lingen. The winner was GM Stelios Halkias (6 pt./9). Gutman himself became 8th with 3.5 pt./9.

== Books ==
- Gutman, Lev (2001). 4... Qh4 in the Scotch Game. Batsford. ISBN 0-7134-8607-4.
- Gutman, Lev (2004). Budapest Fajarowicz: The Fajarowicz-Richter Gambit in Action. Batsford. ISBN 0-7134-8708-9.

== See also ==
- List of Jewish chess players
