= Kacper Drozdowski =

Polish chess player (born 1996)

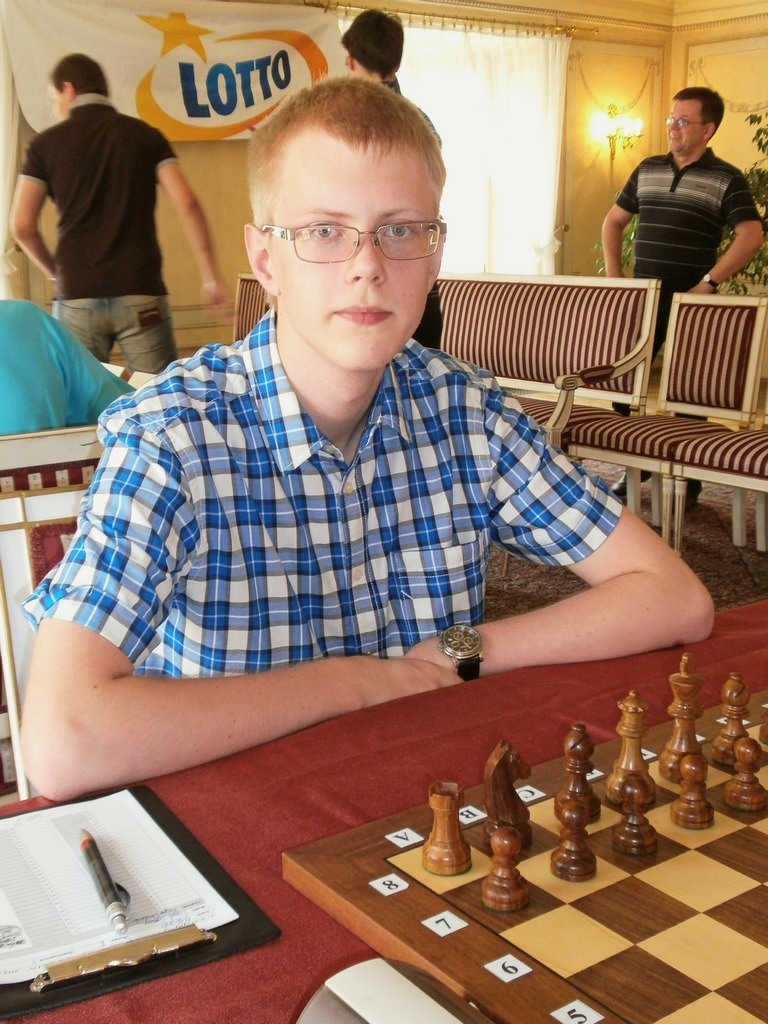
- Kacper Drozdowski in 2013

Personal information
- Born: 14 May 1996 (age 30) Toruń, Poland

Chess career
- Country: Poland
- Title: International Master (2013)
- FIDE rating: 2461 (July 2026)
- Peak rating: 2511 (January 2017)

Kacper Drozdowski (born 14 May 1996) is a Polish chess player who holds the title of International Master.

== Biography ==
Kacper Drozdowski learned to play chess at the age of five. He participated in the Polish Youth Chess Championships in different age groups, which have won five medals: three gold (in 2006 in U10 age group, in 2010 in U14 age group, in 2011 in U16 age group), silver (in 2012 in U18 age group) and bronze (in 2009 in U14 age group). In 2010, he won bronze medal with Jaworzno chess club JKSz MCKiS in Polish Youth Team Chess Championship. Kacper Drozdowski has successfully participated in Polish Youth Championships in blitz and fast chess. He is four-time Polish Youth Fast Chess Champion (in 2008 in U12 age group with time control 15 and 30 minutes for game, in 2011 in U16 age group, in 2014 in U18 age group). In 2007, Kacper Drozdowski won Netherlands Open Youth Chess Championship. In 2012, in Prague he won European Youth Chess Championship in U16 age group. In 2013, he debuted in the final of the Polish Chess Championship. In February 2014, in Budapest Kacper Drozdowski shared 1st place in International Chess Tournament First Saturday.

Kacper Drozdowski three times played for Poland in European Boys' U18 Team Chess Championship (2012-2014), where he won 2 gold (2012, 2013) and silver (2014) medals in team competition, and won silver (2012) and bronze (2014) medals in individual competition.

In 2013, he was awarded the FIDE International Master (IM) title.

In May 2018, Kacper Drozdowski graduated with bachelor's degree in Information Technology and System at the University of Texas at Dallas. In 2018-2019 he was president of the Chess Club at The University of Texas at Dallas.
