= Cappelle-la-Grande Open =

Chess tournament held in France

The Cappelle-la-Grande Open is a chess tournament held every year in Cappelle-la-Grande, France, since 1985. It is usually played in the second half of February with an accelerated Swiss-system format in nine rounds. It is organized by the chess club L'Echiquier Cappellois and is played in the Palais des Arts of Cappelle-la-Grande.

It has become over the years one of the largest opens in the world, but in terms of average player strength slightly behind the Gibraltar Chess Festival or the Aeroflot Open of Moscow.

== List of winners ==
- Note: with multiple first-place finishers, the winner on the Buchholz tie-break is listed first.

#	Year	Winner(s)	Points	Players
1	1985	Waldemar Hanasz (Poland)	6½	68
2	1986	Sergey Smagin (Soviet Union); Viacheslav Eingorn (Soviet Union); Joseph Gallagher (England)	6	106
3	1987	Anthony Kosten (England); Anatoly Vaisser (Soviet Union); Jonny Hector (Sweden)	7	115
4	1988	Vladimir Okhotnik (Soviet Union)	7½	138
5	1989	Nukhim Rashkovsky (Soviet Union); Mark Hebden (England)	7	137
6	1990	Nukhim Rashkovsky (Soviet Union); Mark Hebden (England)	7½	201
7	1991	Anatoly Vaisser (Soviet Union); Matthew Sadler (England)	8	289
8	1992	Julian Hodgson (England)	8	308
9	1993	Evgeniy Solozhenkin (Russia)	7½	416
10	1994	Vladimir Chuchelov (Russia); Tony Miles (England); Gennadi Kuzmin (Ukraine); Mark Hebden (England)	7	401
11	1995	Tony Miles (England); Mark Hebden (England); Evgeny Sveshnikov (Russia)	7	572
12	1996	Alexander Nenashev (Uzbekistan)	7½	509
13	1997	Vladimir Burmakin (Russia); Vladimir Baklan (Ukraine); Ľubomír Ftáčnik (Slovakia); Jean-Marc Degraeve (France); Alexey Vyzmanavin (Russia); Tony Miles (England); Rustam Kasimdzhanov (Uzbekistan); Yuri Kruppa (Ukraine); Mark Hebden (England); Darius Ruželė (Lithuania)	7	504
14	1998	Igor Glek (Russia)	7½	637
15	1999	Simen Agdestein (Norway); Mikhail Gurevich (Belgium); Pavel Tregubov (Russia)	7½	615
16	2000	Yuri Kruppa (Ukraine); Gilberto Milos (Brazil)	7½	643
17	2001	Vladimir Chuchelov (Belgium); Einar Gausel (Norway)	7½	702
18	2002	Eduardas Rozentalis (Lithuania)	7½	677
19	2003	Vladimir Burmakin (Russia); Eduardas Rozentalis (Lithuania); Philipp Schlosser (Germany); Alexander Areshchenko (Ukraine); Jakov Geller (Russia); Dmitry Bocharov (Russia); Evgeny Miroshnichenko (Ukraine)	7	606
20	2004	Evgeny Najer (Russia); Kaido Külaots (Estonia); Artyom Timofeev (Russia); Zoltan Gyimesi (Hungary); Sergey Grigoriants (Russia); Oleg Korneev (Russia)	7	576
21	2005	David Shengelia (Georgia); Michail Brodsky (Ukraine)	7½	589
22	2006	Alexander Moiseenko (Ukraine)	7½	624
23	2007	Wang Yue (China); Vugar Gashimov (Azerbaijan); David Arutinian (Georgia); Yuri Drozdovskij (Ukraine); Vasily Yemelin (Russia)	7	608
24	2008	Vugar Gashimov (Azerbaijan); David Arutinian (Georgia); Sergey Fedorchuk (Ukraine); Yuriy Kryvoruchko (Ukraine); Konstantin Chernyshov (Russia); Andrei Deviatkin (Russia); Vasilios Kotronias (Greece); Erwin L'Ami (Netherlands)	7	612
25	2009	Yuri Vovk (Ukraine)	7½	610
26	2010	Yaroslav Zherebukh (Ukraine)	7½	652
27	2011	Grzegorz Gajewski (Poland)	7½	573
28	2012	Pentala Harikrishna (India); Parimarjan Negi (India); Tornike Sanikidze (Georgia); Tigran Gharamian (France); Martyn Kravtsiv (Ukraine)	7	497
29	2013	Sanan Sjugirov (Russia); Parimarjan Negi (India); Maxim Rodshtein (Israel); Sergey Fedorchuk (Ukraine); Eric Hansen (Canada); Vlad-Cristian Jianu (Romania); Alexei Fedorov (Belarus); Yuri Vovk (Ukraine)	7	564
30	2014	Axel Bachmann (Paraguay); Sergei Azarov (Belarus)	7½	604
31	2015	Li Chao (China); Vladimir Onischuk (Ukraine)	7½	555
32	2016	Gata Kamsky (United States)	7½	538
33	2017	Jean-Marc Degraeve (France)	8	216
34	2018	Christian Bauer (France); Momchil Nikolov (Bulgaria)	8	360
35	2019	Miguoel Admiraal (Netherlands); Sergey Fedorchuk (Ukraine); Namig Guliyev (Azerbaijan); Maxime Lagarde (France); Jules Moussard (France)	7½	332
36	2020	Jules Moussard (France)	8	332
37	2021	Cancelled		
38	2022	Vladislav Bakhmatsky (Ukraine); Nihal Sarin (India); Martin Petrov (Bulgaria); Sergey Fedorchuk (Ukraine); Jesper Søndergaard Thybo (Denmark); Momchil Nikolov (Bulgaria); Nico Zwirs (Netherlands); Julien Song (France)	7	341
39	2023	S. P. Sethuraman (India); Harsha Bharathakoti (India)	7½	382
40	2024	Abhimanyu Puranik (India); Lorenzo Lodici (Italy)	7½	519
41	2025	Mahel Boyer (France); P. Iniyan (India)	7½	533
42	2026	Pranav Anand (India)	7½	566
