= Viorel Iordachescu =

Moldovan chess grandmaster (born 1977)

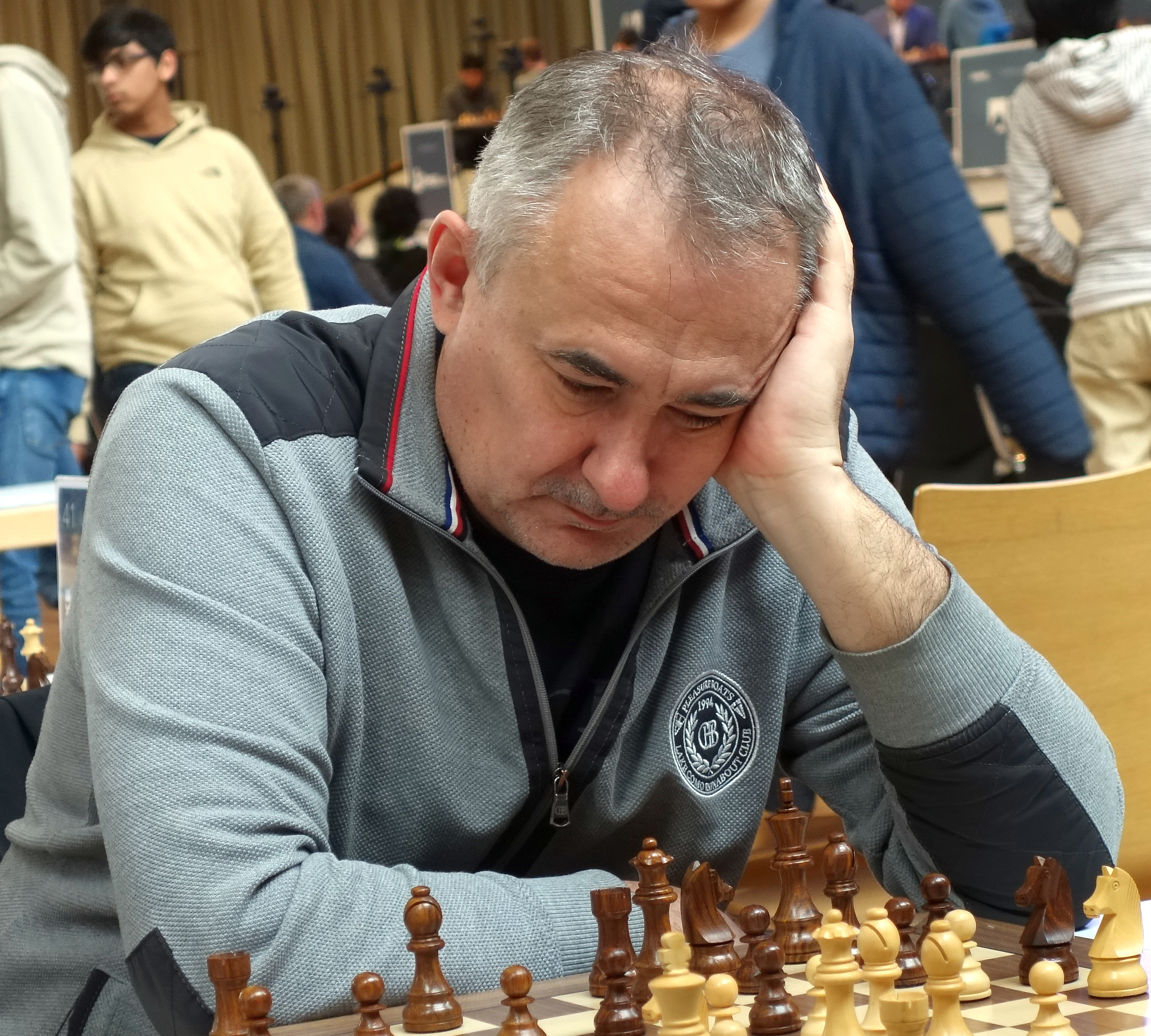
- Iordachescu in 2024

Personal information
- Born: 20 April 1977 (age 49) Chișinău, Moldavian SSR, Soviet Union

Chess career
- Country: Moldova
- Title: Grandmaster (1999)
- FIDE rating: 2558 (October 2026)
- Peak rating: 2651 (January 2012)
- Peak ranking: No. 57 (January 2004)

Viorel Iordachescu (born 20 April 1977) is a Moldovan chess grandmaster. He is a member of the Olympic Team of the Republic of Moldova, FIDE senior trainer, commentator, the president of the National Chess Academy of Moldova, and politician. He was awarded the title of grandmaster by FIDE in 1999.

Iordachescu competed in the FIDE World Championship in 2000 and 2004. In 2002, he finished third in the Corus Tournament C group in Wijk aan Zee. He tied for 1st–6th places with Reiner Odendahl, Erwin l'Ami, Daniël Stellwagen, Susanto Megaranto and Friso Nijboer at HZ Open in 2005. Iordăchescu won the 2006/07 Reggio Emilia tournament.

In 2009 he tied for 2nd–4th with Alexey Korotylev and Sergei Tiviakov at the Moscow Open and won the 13th Open International Bavarian Championship in Bad Wiessee on tiebreak over Vitaly Kunin, Abhijeet Gupta and Gerald Hertneck. In 2010, Iordachescu tied for 1st–8th with Sergey Volkov, Hrant Melkumyan, Eduardo Iturrizaga, Gadir Guseinov, David Arutinian, Aleksej Aleksandrov and Tornike Sanikidze in the 12th Dubai Open. The next year, he took part in the FIDE World Cup, where he was eliminated in the first round by Sébastien Feller. In 2012 Iordachescu won the Nakhchivan Open edging out Sergei Zhigalko and Eltaj Safarli on tiebreak score. Iordachescu competed in the FIDE World Cup 2015, losing in round one to Yu Yangyi. In the same year, he was awarded the title of FIDE Senior Trainer. In 2016 he won the Moldovan Chess Championship.

Iordachescu played for the Moldovan team in the 1994, 1996, 1998, 2000, 2002, 2004, 2006, 2008, 2010, 2012, 2016, and 2018 Chess Olympiads.

== Early life ==
Viorel Iordachescu was born on April 20, 1977, in Chisinau. His father, Ilie Iordăchescu, was an engineer and his mother, Elena Iordăchescu, was an accountant.

At the age of 6, his neighbor Alexandr Șoșev taught him the rules of the game of chess, which eventually became his career. The young player's mother noticed her son's interest in chess and enrolled him in Chisinau's Chess School No. 57, where Iordachescu met his first coach Valerian Vasiloi. With the support of his mother and guided by Vasiloi, the young Iordachescu took part in his first tournaments at the age of 7. At the age of 12, he became a Candidate Master.

From the ages of 12 to 14, Iordachescu was trained by IM Stefan Solonar, and FM Bogdan Pavlenco.

At the age of 15, Iordachescu began training under renowned coach, theoretician, and pedagogue Veaceslav Cebanenco, known as "the Patriarch of Moldovan chess".

Between the ages of 7 and 18, Iordachescu won multiple Moldova Junior Championships.

== Education ==
Iordachescu began his studies at Chisinau's School No. 57, currently the "Traian" Theoretical High School. He continued his studies at Chisinau's "Mihai Eminescu" Theoretical High School. In 2002, he graduated from the State University of Moldova, the Faculty of Journalism and Communication Sciences, and in 2014 he graduated from the State University of Physical Education and Sports.

== Personal life ==
On August 5, 2000, Iordachescu married Svetlana Zubac, a collegemate and a teacher. They have two daughters together, Julietta and Angelina.

== Career ==
During his chess career, Iordachescu represented the Republic of Moldova in numerous tournaments, Olympics, European and World Championships. After the successes achieved in Dresden 1996, Șeki 1998 and Călimănești 1999, he was awarded the title of Chess Grandmaster.

In 2000 he participated in the Minsk Zonal tournament with other strong players from Moldova, Belarus, and Azerbaijan, ranking second and qualifying for the World Championship. It was there that he met young Azerbaijani player Vugar Gashimov. This meeting laid the foundations for a fruitful and lasting collaboration between the two chess players. Iordachescu trained Gashimov from 2008-2012. During this period, Gashimov won several elite tournaments, ranking in the top 10 of the world. However, in 2014, Gashimov died after suffering from brain cancer. The annual Gashimov Memorial tournament in his honor was subsequently organized, with Iordachescu invited as a guest of honor and commentator.

At the knockout World Championship in New Delhi 2000, Iordachescu defeated Italian Michele Godena, but lost in tiebreaks in the second round to Sergei Movsesian.

In 2005, he won the Vlissingen tournament.

In 2006, he won the Reggio Emilia tournament.

In 2009, he ranked 2nd at the Moscow Open. In the same year, he won the Bavarian Championship.

In 2010, he shared 1st place at the Dubai Open.

In 2012, he won the Nakhchivan Open.

Iordachescu is a multiple-time Champion of the Republic of Moldova and an active member of their Olympic team. The best result of their men's team was recorded at the Chess Olympiad in Turin in 2006.

== Important tournaments ==
Reggio Emilia (2007)

Dubai Open (2010)

London Chess Classic Open (2013)

European Championship (2003)

Isle of Man Masters (2007)

Goodricke Open (2000)

Khanty-Mansiysk Olympiad (2010)

Gibraltar Masters (2011)

European Championship (2014)

European Championship (2011)

European Championship (2001)

European Championship (2007)

European Championship (2013)

Baku Olympiad (2016)

Istanbul Olympiad (2012)

== Olympiads ==
Iordachescu represented the Republic of Moldova at the Chess Olympiads in 1994, 1996, 1998, 2002, 2004, 2006, 2008, 2010, 2012, 2016, and 2018.

== National Chess Academy of Moldova ==
Iordachescu is known for his considerable contribution in promoting chess in the Republic of Moldova and beyond. In 2010 he became the president of the National Chess Academy of Moldova. Together with his partner, Ion Gîrneț, he implemented the “Chess Unites” project, launched an interactive chess teaching platform developed by the Kasparov Foundation, participates in the elaboration of Moldova's chess curriculum under the auspices of the Ministry of Education, and organizes tournaments and training courses for chess teachers. After years of hard work and dedication from Iordachescu, chess has become a subject taught in schools in Chisinau and the National Chess Academy of Moldova actively promotes it.

In 2021 Iordachescu was decorated with the "Order of the Republic" for civic initiative, remarkable success, and the promotion of the image of the Republic of Moldova in the world.

== Coaching ==
Throughout his career, Iordachescu has managed to successfully combine activity as a player with that of a coach. In 2015, he obtained the title of FIDE Senior Trainer. Since 2016, he has been working as a coach in chess clubs in the United Arab Emirates. In 2017, Iordachescu's student Rouda Al Serkal won the Girls Under 8 World Champion title, the first such champion from the United Arab Emirates. Al Serkal obtained her second title for girls under 9 a year later.

Iordachescu’s students. Results and achievements during the collaboration period.

· Salem Al Saleh, Grandmaster, UAE

- ranks in the top 50 in the world

- Arab Chess Champion

· Rouda Al Serkal, UAE

- World Champion 2017, girls under 8

- World School Chess Champion 2018, girls under 9

- 3rd place at the World School Chess Championship in 2016, girls under 7.

· Omran Al Hosani, UAE

- Arab Champion, boys under 20

- UAE Men Classical and Rapid Chess Champion

· Sultan Al Zaabi, UAE

- Arab Champion, boys under 18

- UAE Champion, boys under 18

· Bogdan-Daniel Deac, Grandmaster, Romania

- In 2016, at the age of 15, is awarded the title of Grandmaster

· Cristina Moșin, the Republic of Moldova

- Double European Champion, girls under 14

- World Vice Champion, girls under 16

· Vugar Gashimov, Grandmaster, Azerbaijan

- From 2008 to 2011, ranks in the top 10 in the world (number 6 in 2009).

· Axel Rombaldoni, Grandmaster, Italy

- Italian Champion

· Denis Rombaldoni, International Master, Italy

- Italian Champion

· Yuriy Kuzubov, Grandmaster, Ukraine

- Ukrainian Champion, 2014

· Liviu-Dieter Nisipeanu, Grandmaster, Romania

- European Champion, 2005

· Alexander Motylev', Grandmaster, Russia'

- European Champion, 2014

== Politics ==
From 2019 to 2021, Iordachescu was the First Vice President of the Moldovan National Unity Party.

== Other activities and major events ==
Iordachescu knows several European languages (Romanian, Russian, English, French and Italian) and practices sports journalism. He is often invited as a commentator to chess tournaments and publishes articles in specialized sources.

=== Commentator ===
· Shamkir Gashimov Memorial 2014 (English)

· Khanty–Mansiysk Grand Prix 2014 (English)

· Cap Aurora Open 2014 (Romanian)

· Shamkir Gashimov Memorial 2015 (Russian)

· Abu Dhabi Festival 2016, 2017, 2018, 2019 (English)

· AIMAG, Turkmenistan, 2017 (English and Russian)

· Sharjah Masters 2018, 2019 (English)

=== Publications ===
· New in Chess (Netherlands, 2000)

· Chess Informant (Serbia, 1995- 2012)

== Honors ==
According to the decree of October 15, 2021, signed by the president of the Republic of Moldova Maia Sandu, Iordachescu was decorated with the "Order of the Republic" "As a sign of high appreciation of special merits to the state, for substantial contribution in the world, for remarkable professional successes, for civic initiative and active participation in advancing reforms, as well as on the occasion of the XXXth anniversary of the proclamation of the independence of the Republic of Moldova ... ”

In 2019, Iordachescu was named "The Chess Player of the Year" by Moldova.
