= Yuri Kruppa =

Ukrainian chess grandmaster (born 1964)

Personal information
- Born: June 21, 1964 (age 62) Lviv, Ukrainian SSR, Soviet Union

Chess career
- Country: Ukraine
- Title: Grandmaster (1995)
- FIDE rating: 2572 (July 2026)
- Peak rating: 2603 (July 1999)

Yuri Nikolaevich Kruppa is a Ukrainian chess grandmaster.

== Chess career ==
He won the Ukrainian Chess Championship in 1994 and earned the Grandmaster title in 1995.

In 1997, he tied for first place with Vladimir Burmakin, Vladimir Baklan, Ľubomír Ftáčnik, Jean-Marc Degraeve, Alexey Vyzmanavin, Tony Miles, Rustam Kasimdzhanov, Mark Hebden, and Darius Ruželė in the Cappelle-la-Grande Open tournament.

He served as a coach in the A.V.Momot Chess Club, which opened in 1999. He also served as a trainer of the Ukrainian team.

In 2000, he won the Cappelle-la-Grande Open tournament, beating Gilberto Milos on tiebreak scores.

In August 2011, he finished as the runner-up in the Nabokov Memorial.

== Personal life ==
He graduated from the Lviv State University of Physical Culture.
