= Miguoel Admiraal =

Dutch chess player (born 1994)

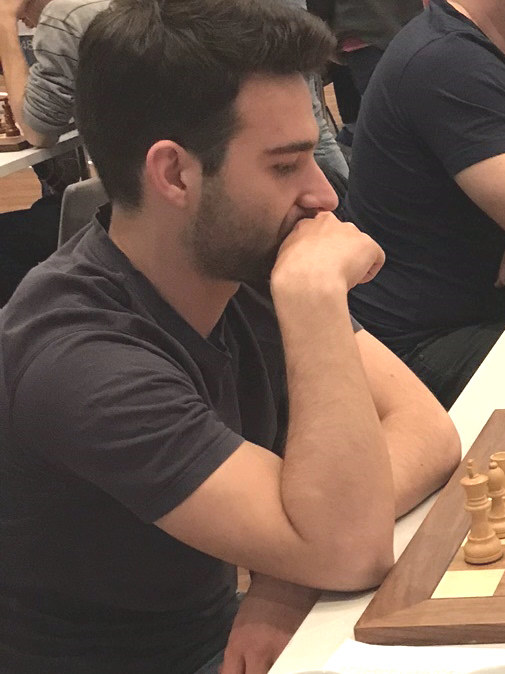
- Admiraal in 2019

Personal information
- Born: November 18, 1994 (age 31) Amsterdam, Netherlands

Chess career
- Country: Netherlands
- Title: International Master (2015)
- FIDE rating: 2470 (July 2026)
- Peak rating: 2516 (April 2019)

Miguoel Admiraal is a Dutch chess player.

== Chess career ==
In January 2016, Admiraal competed in the Challengers section of the Tata Steel Chess Tournament. He managed to hold draws against a number of significantly higher-rated players: Eltaj Safarli, Alexey Dreev, and Liviu-Dieter Nisipeanu.

In July 2018, Admiraal achieved his first GM norm by winning the Andorra Open, where he defeated a number of grandmasters: Alexander Shabalov, Vitaly Kunin, and Christopher Repka.

In February 2019, Admiraal achieved his second GM norm by winning the Cappelle-la-Grande Open tournament with a score of 7.5/9 ahead of grandmasters Sergey Fedorchuk, Namig Guliyev, Maxime Lagarde, and Jules Moussard due to better tiebreak results.
