= Martyn Kravtsiv =

Ukrainian chess grandmaster (born 1990)

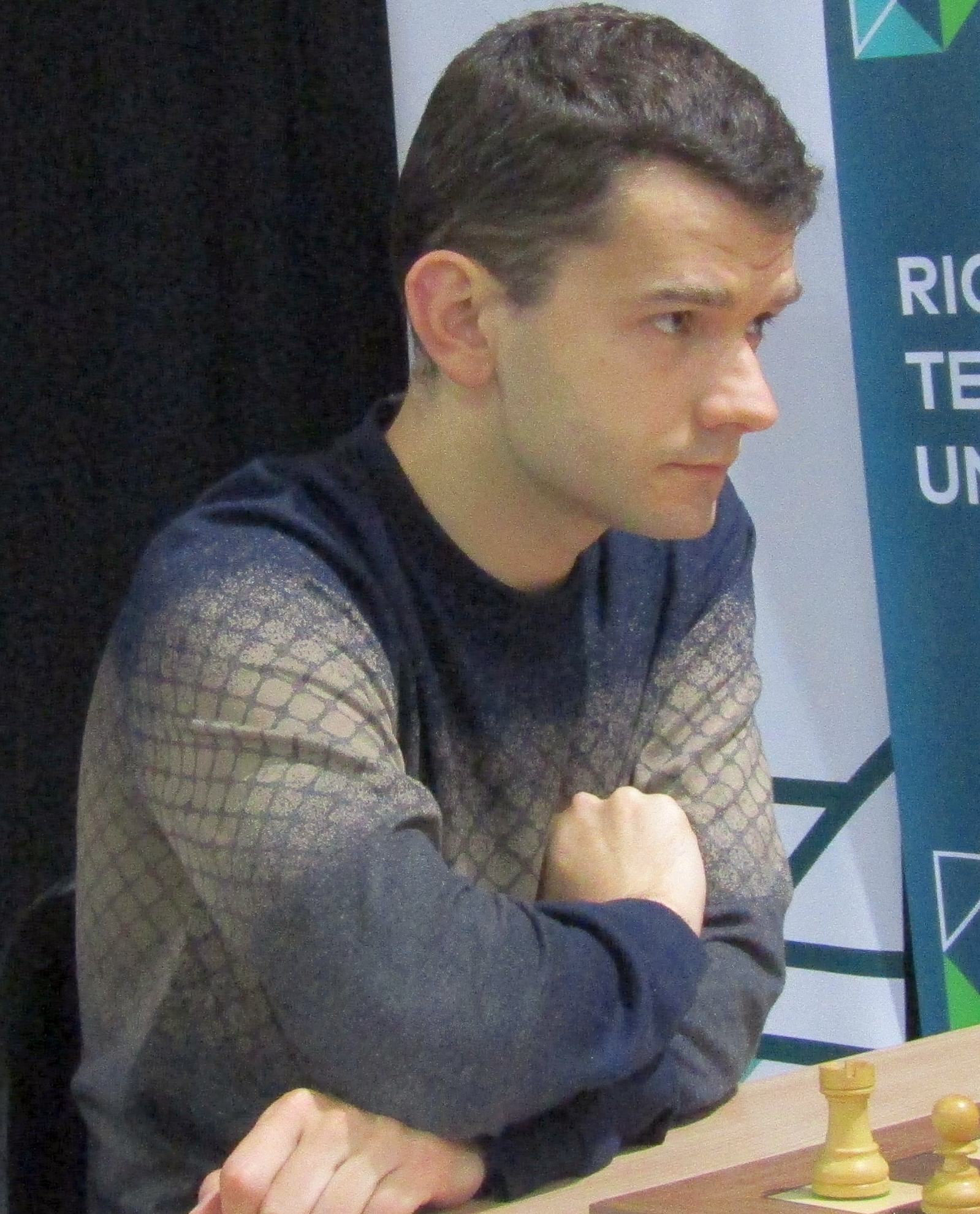

Personal information
- Born: 26 November 1990 (age 35) Lviv, Ukrainian SSR, Soviet Union

Chess career
- Country: Ukraine
- Title: Grandmaster (2009)
- FIDE rating: 2598 (July 2026)
- Peak rating: 2685 (March 2018)
- Peak ranking: No. 59 (March 2018)

Martyn Romanovich Kravtsiv (Ukrainian: Мартин Кравців; born 26 November 1990) is a Ukrainian chess grandmaster. He competed in the FIDE World Cup in 2013.

== Career ==
Kravtsiv was taught how to play chess on his sixth birthday by his father. Later, he trained at the Lviv Chess Club. In the 2008 World Mind Sports Games in Beijing, Kravtsiv won the gold medal in the men's individual blitz event. In 2010, he tied for first place with Dmitry Kokarev, Alexey Dreev, Maxim Turov, Baskaran Adhiban and Aleksej Aleksandrov in the 2nd Orissa Open tournament in Bhubaneshwar. In 2011, Kravtsiv won the 3rd Chennai Open. In 2011, he tied for first place with Pentala Harikrishna, Parimarjan Negi, Tornike Sanikidze and Tigran Gharamian in the Cappelle-la-Grande Open. He tied for first with Andrei Volokitin and Zahar Efimenko in the 2015 Ukrainian Championship, held in his native city of Lviv, finishing second on tiebreak. In 2016, Kravtsiv won the Riga Technical University Open edging out Hrant Melkumyan, Arturs Neikšāns, Aleksey Goganov and Jiří Štoček on tiebreak score.

In team events, Kravtsiv played for Ukraine in the 2006 World Youth U16 Olympiad, which was won by his team, and the World Team Chess Championship in 2017. He won the 2018 Gujarat Open GM tournament.

Best tournament results: Andranik Margaryan Memorial 2013 – 1st place, Al Ain Chess Classic 2013 – 1–3, Lviv Vasylyshyn Memorial (2014) – 1st place, 8th OGD Prinsenstad 2015 – 1st place, 22nd Abu Dhabi Int. Chess Festival (2015) – 2nd place, Ukraine Men's Final – 2015 – 2nd place, Al Ain Classic 2015 – 2–10, Riga Technical University Open 2016 – 1st place, 1st Sharjah Chess Masters 2017 – 1–5, Lake Sevan 2017 – 2nd place, 1st Gujarat international open (2018) – 1st place, Cap d'Agde chess (2018) – 3rd place.

He was a coach of the Ukrainian National chess team during 42nd Chess Olympiad in Baku 2016 (silver medal) and 23rd European Team Chess Championship 2021 (gold medal).

Kravtsiv has written 5 chess books.
