= David Arutinian =

Georgian chess grandmaster (born 1984)

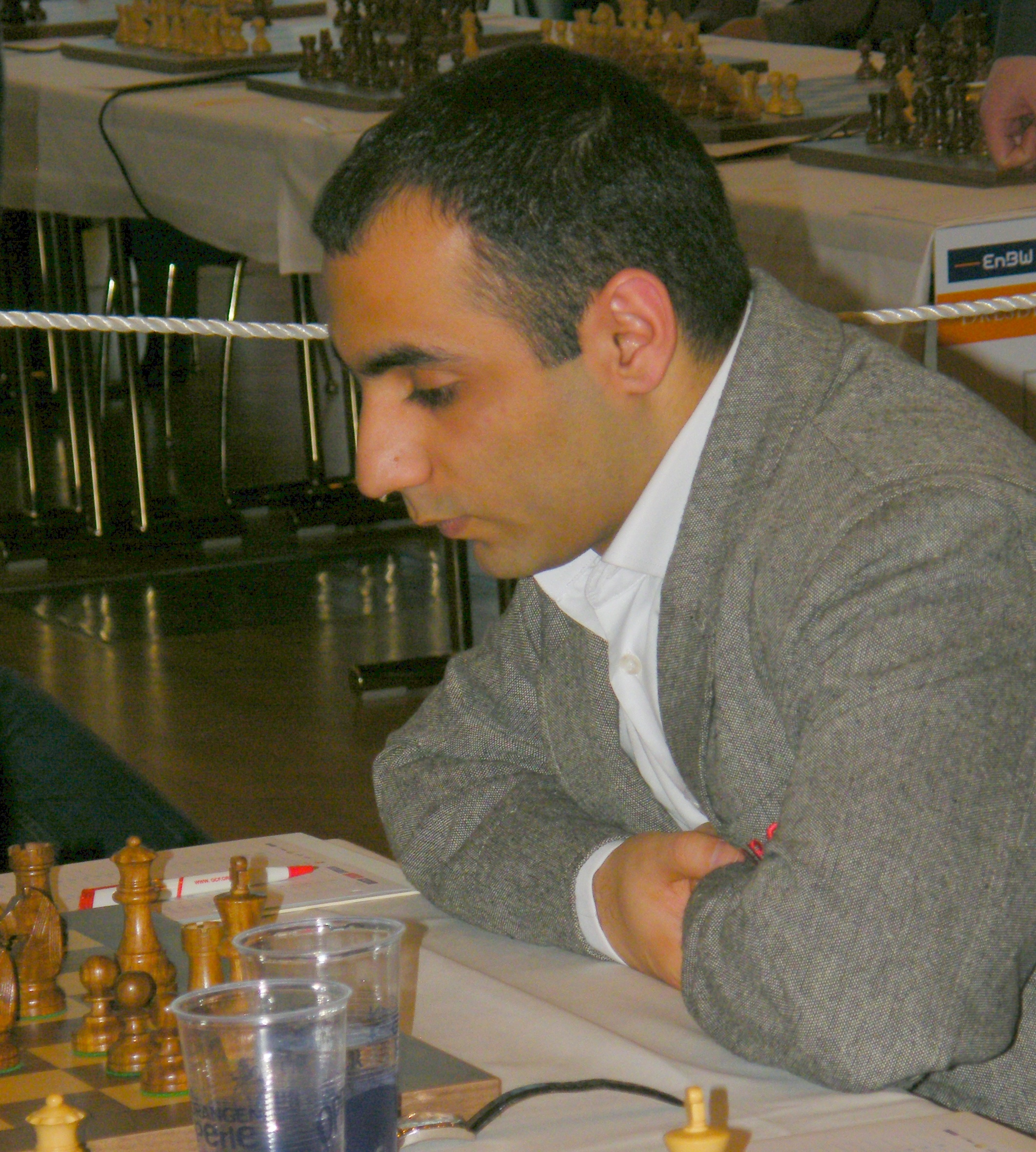
- David Arutinian in Dresden 2008

Personal information
- Born: May 31, 1984 (age 42)

Chess career
- Country: Georgia
- Title: Grandmaster (2006)
- FIDE rating: 2549 (July 2026)
- Peak rating: 2593 (April 2008)

David Gareginovich Arutinian (born May 31, 1984) is a Georgian chess grandmaster since 2006, and an international master since 2002. He is ranked 9th in Georgia and 453rd in the world. His highest rating was 2593 (in April 2008).

== Chess career ==
Arutinian's main results are:

- Strasbourg Prestige open — 1st place
- Aeroflot open A2 — 1st place.
- In 2007, tied for first place with Wang Yue, Vugar Gashimov, Vasily Yemelin and Yuri Drozdovskij in the Cappelle-la-Grande Open.
- In 2008 he tied for 1st–8th with Vugar Gashimov, Sergey Fedorchuk, Yuriy Kryvoruchko, Konstantin Chernyshov, Andrei Deviatkin, Vasilios Kotronias and Erwin L'Ami in the Cappelle-la-Grande Open.
- 2009: 2nd place in 16th Vienna Open
- 2010: he tied for 1st–8th with Sergey Volkov, Viorel Iordăchescu, Eduardo Iturrizaga, Gadir Guseinov, Hrant Melkumyan, Aleksej Aleksandrov and Tornike Sanikidze in the 12th Dubai Open.
- 2011: Sydney International Open — tied for 2nd–8th place, 2nd place using Buchholz
- In 2012, Warsaw chess festival group A — 2nd place.
- 2012: 1st place in rapid chess event at the 11th Open International de Rochefort
- In 2012, 11th Rochefort Open tournament — tied 1st place with Bassem Amin.
- He won the Karen Asrian Memorial in 2012.

Arutinian is the Georgian runner-up in 2006 and 2007. He represented Georgia in 2 Olympics: 2006 and 2008.

In 2007, he was also a participant in the European Team Championships.

Arutinian is a FIDE Senior Trainer (2016). He coaches the men and women Georgian Olympic team.

Some of his successful students are:

- Sopiko Guramishvili — World champion under 16, 2006
- Keti Tsatsalashvili — World champion under 16, 2007
- Bobby Cheng — World champion under 12, 2009
- Anna Maja Kazarian — European Silver medal under 12, 2012
- Sayin Zhanat — World School Champion under 16, 2015
- Zhansaya Abdumalik — Silver medal in World chess championship under 12, Silver medal in World Junior chess championship under 20

Georgian Women Olympic team: 2nd place in European team chess championship in 2009, 3rd place in World chess Olympiad in 2010
