= Dmitry Bocharov (chess player) =

Russian chess grandmaster (born 1982)

Personal information
- Born: October 20, 1982 (age 43) Novosibirsk, Russian SFSR, Soviet Union

Chess career
- Country: Russia
- Title: Grandmaster (2003)
- FIDE rating: 2534 (July 2026)
- Peak rating: 2647 (January 2009)
- Peak ranking: No. 77 (January 2009)

Dmitry Sergeevich Bocharov (Russian: Дмитрий Бочаров; born October 20, 1982) is a Russian chess grandmaster.

In 2003, he tied for first with Vladimir Burmakin, Eduardas Rozentalis, Philipp Schlosser, Alexander Areshchenko, Jakov Geller and Evgeny Miroshnichenko in the Cappelle-la-Grande Open, finishing sixth on tiebreak. In 2004, Bocharov took clear first place at the Masters tournament of the 14th Abu Dhabi Chess Festival.

He competed in the Chess World Cup 2005, where he was knocked out in the second round by Gata Kamsky. In 2006 he won the 14th Chigorin Memorial in Saint Petersburg. In 2008 Bocharov won the 10th World University Chess Championship in Novokuznetsk.

At the 2009 Voronezh Open he tied for first with Sergey Volkov, Igor Lysyj, Aleksandr Rakhmanov, Valerij Popov, Denis Khismatullin, Dmitry Andreikin and Dmitry Kokarev, placing eighth on countback. In the same year he tied for first in the 11th Dubai Open, finishing second on tiebreak. In 2011 he came first in the Chigorin Memorial for the second time.

He played for Novosibirsk's team "Siberia" (alongside Vladimir Kramnik and Levon Aronian among others) that won both the Russian Team Chess Championship Premiere League and the European Chess Club Cup in 2015. Bocharov won the 2015 Russian Blitz Chess Championship.

In 2020, Bocharov placed 2nd-6th in the 1st Mukhtar Ismagambetov Memorial along with Shakhriyar Mamedyarov, Nodirbek Abdusattorov, Kazybek Nogerbek, and Davit Maghalashvili, with a score of 8.5/11.
