= Konstantin Chernyshov =

Russian chess grandmaster (born 1967)

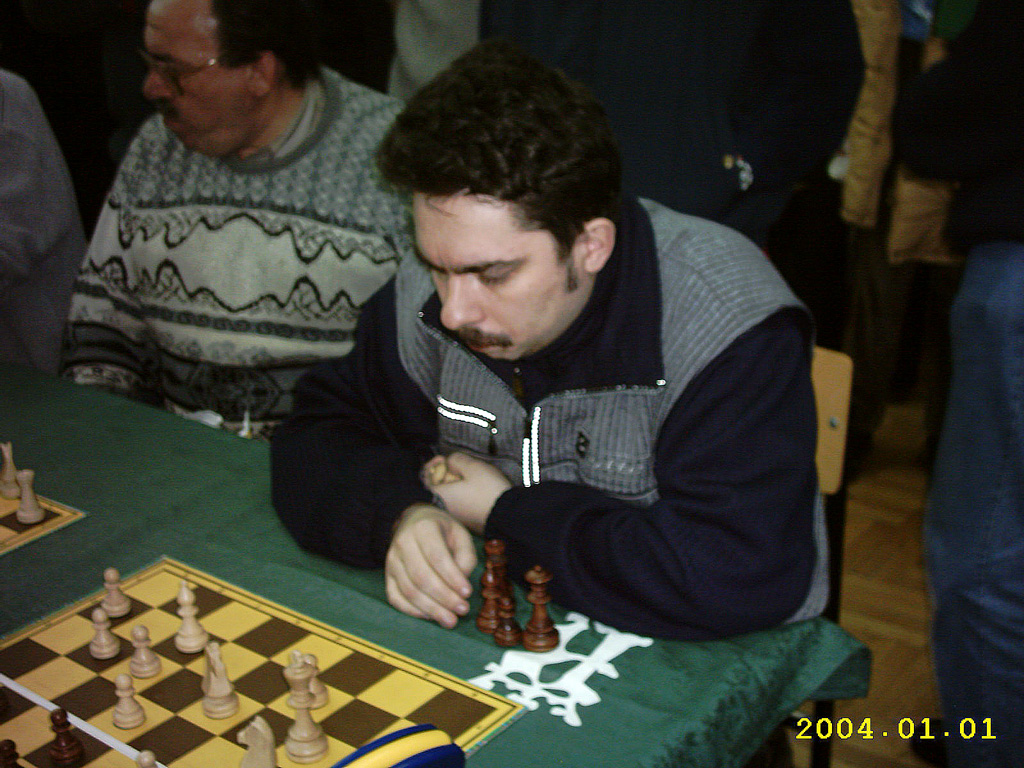
- Konstantin Chernyshov, Kraków 2004

Personal information
- Born: Константин Чернышов; June 11, 1967 (age 59) Voronezh, Soviet Union

Chess career
- Country: Russia
- Title: Grandmaster (2000)
- Peak rating: 2597 (January 2011)

Konstantin Valeryevich Chernyshov (Russian: Константин Валерьевич Чернышов, born June 11, 1967) is a Russian chess grandmaster (2000) and a chess coach.

In 2008 he tied for 1st–8th with Vugar Gashimov, David Arutinian, Yuriy Kryvoruchko, Sergey Fedorchuk, Andrei Deviatkin, Vasilios Kotronias and Erwin L'Ami in the Cappelle-la-Grande Open Tournament. In 2010 he tied for 1st–4th with Evgeny Bareev, Lê Quang Liêm and Ernesto Inarkiev in the Moscow Open and won the event on tie-break.

Chernyshov is the author of Cognitive Chess: Improving Your Visualization and Calculation Skills. The book was published by Russell Enterprises in 2021 and contains hundreds of exercises that are intended to be worked through in the reader's mind, without looking at a chess board.
