= Tigran Gharamian =

Armenian-French chess grandmaster (born 1984)

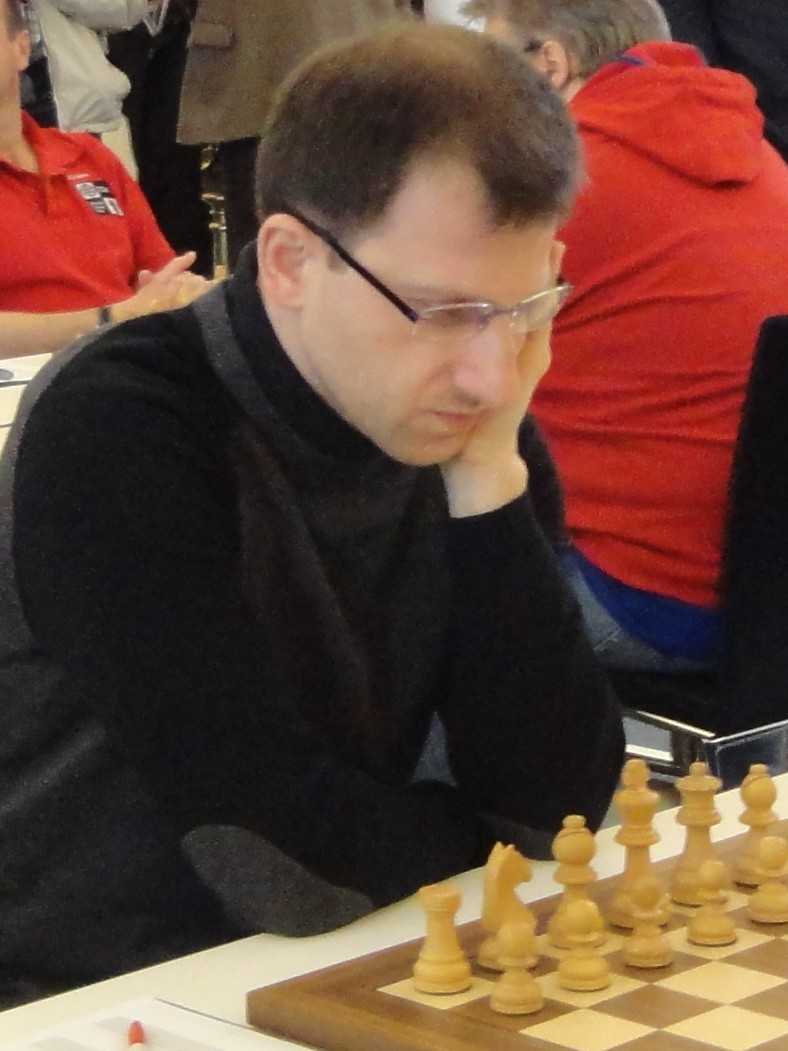
- Tigran Gharamian, 2016 Baden-Baden

Personal information
- Born: 24 July 1984 (age 41) Yerevan, Armenian SSR, Soviet Union

Chess career
- Country: Armenia (until 2004); France (since 2004)
- Title: Grandmaster (2009)
- FIDE rating: 2572 (July 2026)
- Peak rating: 2676 (September 2011)
- Peak ranking: No. 67 (September 2011)

Tigran Gharamian (Armenian: Տիգրան Ղարամյան, born 24 July 1984) is an Armenian-French chess grandmaster. He won the French Chess Championship in 2018.

== Chess career ==
Gharamian played for Armenia in the Children's Chess Olympiads of 1999 and 2000.

He came first at Fourmies 2007 and Charleroi 2007. In 2010 he tied for 1st–3rd with Vadim Malakhatko and Deep Sengupta in the 24th Open Pierre and Vacances. In 2011 he won the Vandœuvre-lès-Nancy Open and tied for 2nd–4th with Alexander Kovchan, Boris Grachev and Ante Brkić in the Open Master Tournament in Biel. Gharamian tied for 1st–5th with Pentala Harikrishna, Parimarjan Negi, Tornike Sanikidze and Martyn Kravtsiv in the Cappelle-la-Grande Open 2012. He won the French Chess Championship in 2018.
