= Tata Steel Chess Tournament 2012 =

Chess tournament 2012

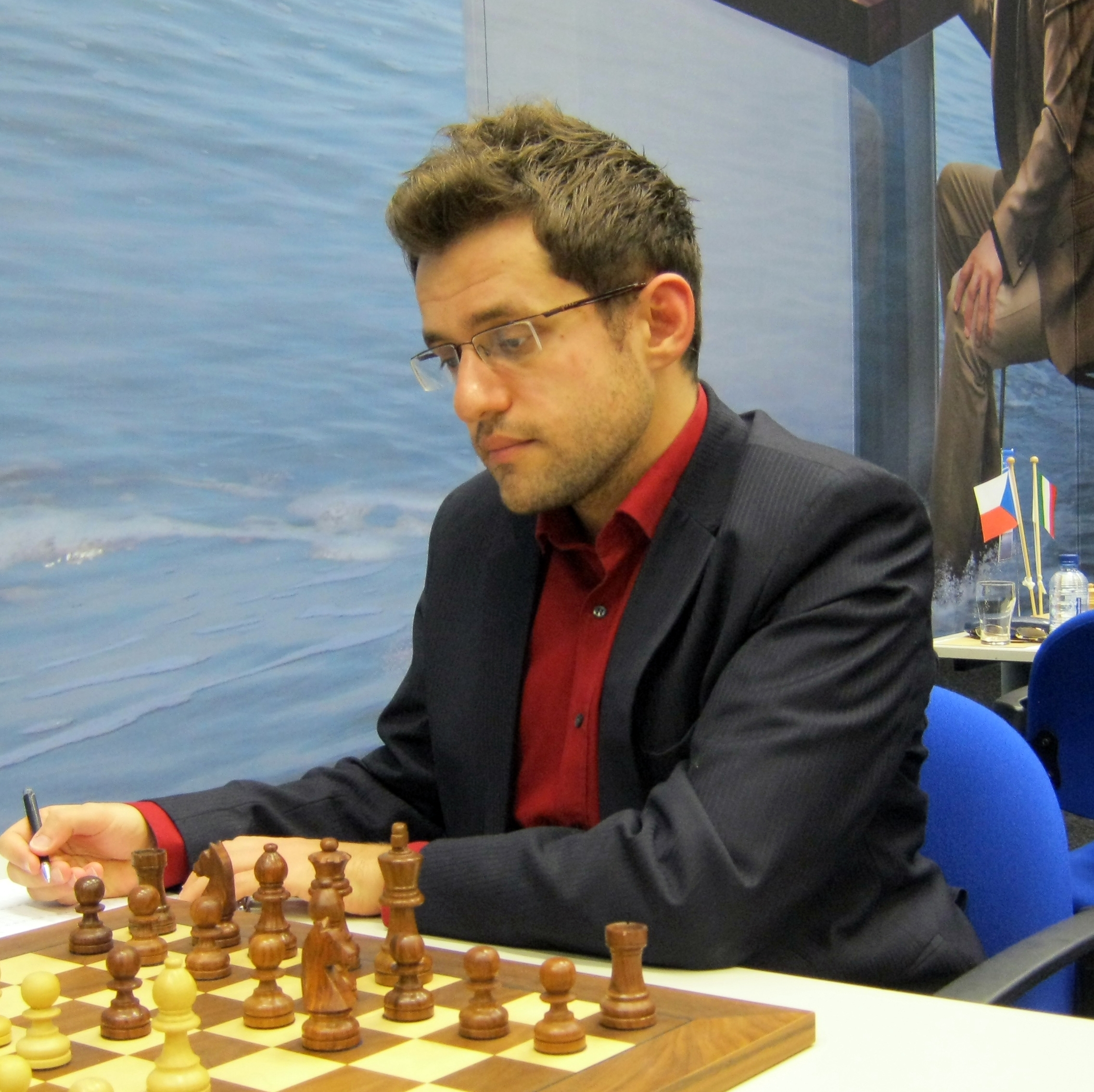
- Levon Aronian pictured at Tata Steel 2012.
- Location: Wijk aan Zee, Netherlands
- Dates: 14–29 January 2012
- Competitors: 42
- Winning score: 9 points of 13

Champion
- (Armenia) Levon Aronian

The Tata Steel Chess Tournament 2012 was the 74th edition of the Tata Steel Chess Tournament. Previously known as the Corus Chess Tournament, it was renamed after Tata Steel, which purchased the Corus Group. It was held in Wijk aan Zee from 14 to 29 January 2012.

The tournament was won by Levon Aronian for the third time. Aronian finished on 9/13.

74th Tata Steel Chess, grandmaster group A, 14–29 January 2012, Wijk aan Zee, Cat. XXI (2755)
	Player	Rating	1	2	3	4	5	6	7	8	9	10	11	12	13	14	Total	SB	TPR
1	Levon Aronian (Armenia)	2805		0	½	1	½	1	1	1	½	1	½	1	0	1	9		2892
2	Magnus Carlsen (Norway)	2835	1		½	½	½	½	½	0	½	1	1	1	½	½	8	50.25	2835
3	Teimour Radjabov (Azerbaijan)	2773	½	½		½	½	½	½	1	½	½	½	1	1	½	8	49.50	2840
4	Fabiano Caruana (Italy)	2732	0	½	½		½	½	½	1	½	1	1	½	½	1	8	47.50	2843
5	Vasyl Ivanchuk (Ukraine)	2763	½	½	½	½		½	½	½	½	0	½	1	1	1	7½	46.25	2811
6	Hikaru Nakamura (United States)	2759	0	½	½	½	½		½	½	1	1	½	½	1	½	7½	44.75	2811
7	Gata Kamsky (United States)	2732	0	½	½	½	½	½		1	½	½	1	½	1	0	7		2785
8	Sergey Karjakin (Russia)	2766	0	1	0	0	½	½	0		1	0	1	½	1	1	6½		2753
9	Loek van Wely (Netherlands)	2692	½	½	½	½	½	0	½	0		½	½	½	½	½	5½		2702
10	Boris Gelfand (Israel)	2739	0	0	½	0	1	0	½	1	½		½	½	½	0	5	31.50	2669
11	Veselin Topalov (Bulgaria)	2770	½	0	½	0	½	½	0	0	½	½		½	½	1	5	30.50	2666
12	Vugar Gashimov (Azerbaijan)	2761	0	0	0	½	0	½	½	½	½	½	½		½	1	5	29.00	2667
13	David Navara (Czech Republic)	2712	1	½	0	½	0	0	0	0	½	½	½	½		½	4½	29.50	2648
14	Anish Giri (Netherlands)	2714	0	½	½	0	0	½	1	0	½	1	0	0	½		4½	28.75	2648

74th Tata Steel Chess, grandmaster group B, 14–29 January 2012, Wijk aan Zee, Cat. XV (2603)
	Player	Rating	1	2	3	4	5	6	7	8	9	10	11	12	13	14	Total	SB	TPR
1	GM Pentala Harikrishna (India)	2665		½	1	½	½	½	1	½	1	0	1	1	½	1	9		2739
2	GM Alexander Motylev (Russia)	2677	½		½	½	1	½	½	½	½	1	1	1	½	½	8½	52.25	2707
3	GM Lázaro Bruzón (Cuba)	2691	0	½		½	½	½	0	1	1	1	½	1	1	1	8½	47.75	2706
4	GM Erwin l'Ami (Netherlands)	2596	½	½	½		1	½	½	0	½	0	1	1	1	1	8	48.00	2690
5	GM Sergei Tiviakov (Netherlands)	2677	½	0	½	0		1	½	1	1	0	1	½	1	1	8	46.75	2684
6	GM Dimitri Reinderman (Netherlands)	2581	½	½	½	½	0		1	0	1	1	½	1	½	½	7½	46.00	2661
7	GM Illia Nyzhnyk (Ukraine)	2568	0	½	1	½	½	0		½	0	½	1	1	1	1	7½	43.00	2662
8	GM Vladimir Potkin (Russia)	2684	½	½	0	1	0	1	½		½	0	½	½	½	1	6½		2596
9	GM Jan Timman (Netherlands)	2571	0	½	0	½	0	0	1	½		1	½	½	1	½	6		2576
10	GM Sipke Ernst (Netherlands)	2606	1	0	0	1	1	0	½	1	0		0	0	0	½	5		2515
11	GM Kateryna Lagno (Ukraine)	2557	0	0	½	0	0	½	0	½	½	1		½	½	½	4½	25.25	2496
12	GM Daniele Vocaturo (Italy)	2545	0	0	0	0	½	0	0	½	½	1	½		1	½	4½	23.25	2497
13	GM Viktorija Čmilytė (Lithuania)	2503	½	½	0	0	0	½	0	½	0	1	½	0		½	4		2469
14	GM Harika Dronavalli (India)	2516	0	½	0	0	0	½	0	0	½	½	½	½	½		3½		2434

74th Tata Steel Chess, grandmaster group C, 14–29 January 2012, Wijk aan Zee, Cat. IX (2454)
	Player	Rating	1	2	3	4	5	6	7	8	9	10	11	12	13	14	Total	SB	TPR
1	GM Maxim Turov (Russia)	2645		½	½	1	½	½	½	1	1	1	1	1	1	1	10½		2690
2	GM Hans Tikkanen (Sweden)	2549	½		½	½	1	1	1	½	1	1	1	0	1	1	10		2658
3	GM Daan Brandenburg (Netherlands)	2527	½	½		½	½	½	½	½	1	½	½	1	1	1	8½	49.75	2558
4	GM Adhiban Baskaran (India)	2561	0	½	½		1	½	1	½	½	½	½	1	1	1	8½	48.75	2556
5	IM Sahaj Grover (India)	2532	½	0	½	0		½	1	½	½	1	1	½	1	0	7	41.25	2477
6	GM Matthew Sadler (England)	2660	½	0	½	½	½		½	½	½	½	½	1	½	1	7	40.75	2467
7	IM Elisabeth Pähtz (Germany)	2454	½	0	½	0	0	½		1	½	1	1	½	1	½	7	39.00	2483
8	IM Tania Sachdev (India)	2411	0	½	½	½	½	½	0		½	½	0	½	1	1	6		2428
9	GM Elina Danielian (Armenia)	2490	0	0	0	½	½	½	½	½		1	0	1	½	½	5½		2394
10	FM Etienne Goudriaan (Netherlands)	2279	0	0	½	½	0	½	0	½	0		1	½	1	½	5		2380
11	Lars Ootes (Netherlands)	2326	0	0	½	½	0	½	0	1	1	0		1	0	0	4½		2354
12	Pieter Hopman (Netherlands)	2342	0	1	0	0	½	0	½	½	0	½	0		0	1	4	26.00	2322
13	WIM Lisa Schut (Netherlands)	2290	0	0	0	0	0	½	0	0	½	0	1	1		1	4	18.25	2326
14	WIM Anne Haast (Netherlands)	2290	0	0	0	0	1	0	½	0	½	½	1	0	0		3½		2292
