= Mayorov =

Mayorov (Russian: Майоров), or Mayorova (feminine; Майорова), is a common Russian surname. It is derived from the sobriquet "майор" (literally means "major"), which may refer to:

- Alexander Mayorov (born 1957), Soviet Nordic combined skier
- Boris Mayorov (born 1938), Soviet hockey player
- Henrich Mayorov (1936-2022), Russian-Ukrainian ballet dancer
- Lev Mayorov (1969-2020), Azerbaijani football player
- Maxim Mayorov (born 1989), Russian born professional ice hockey player
- Yevgeni Mayorov (1938–1997), Soviet hockey player
- Vitaly Maiorov (1961–1997), Lithuanian chess master
- Albina Mayorova (born 1977), Russian long-distance runner
- Elena Mayorova (1958–1997), Soviet film and stage actress

== See also ==
- Mayor
