= Gadir Guseinov =

Azerbaijani chess grandmaster (born 1986)

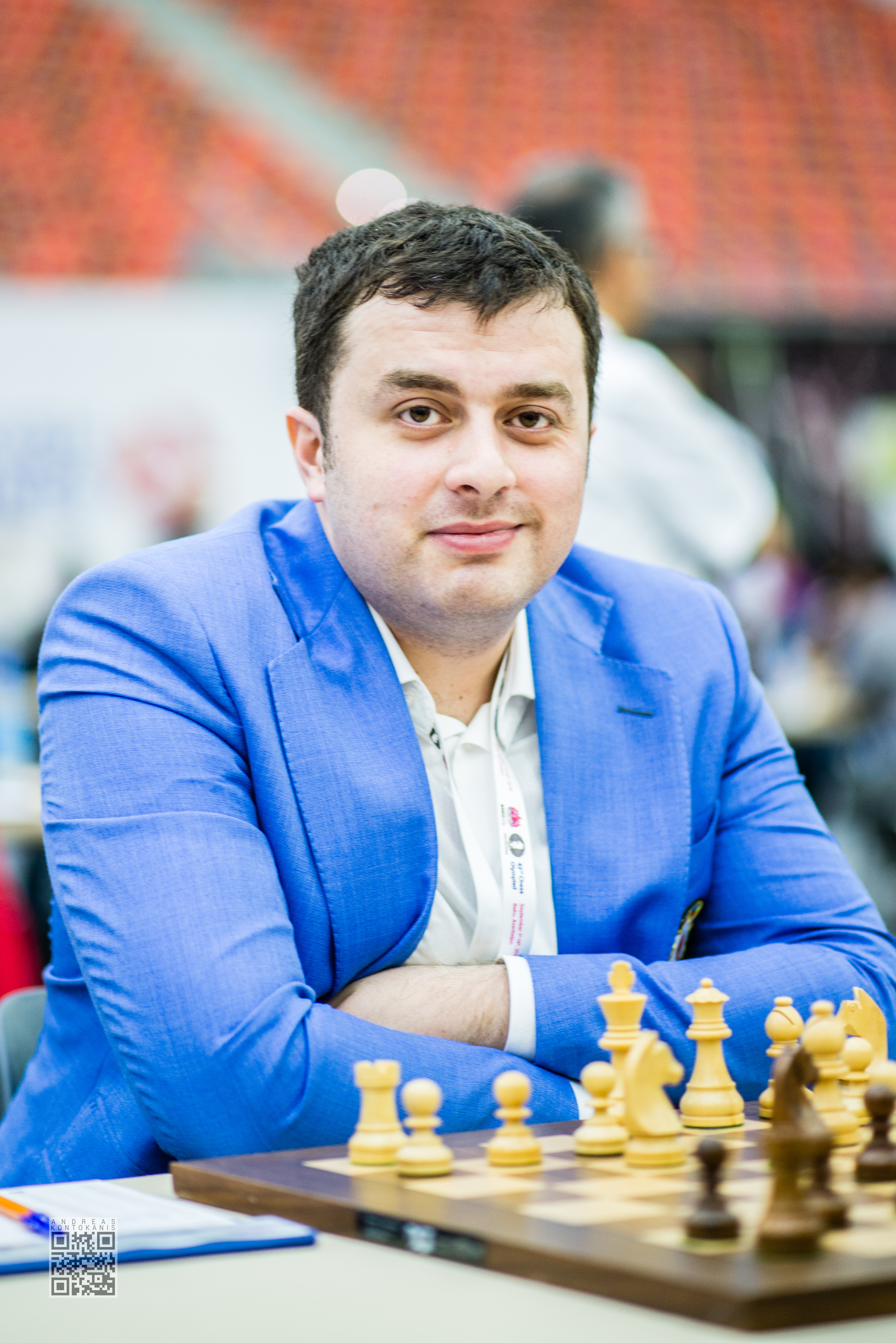
- Guseinov in 2016 Chess Olympiad

Personal information
- Born: Qədir Hüseynov; 21 May 1986 (age 40) Moscow, Russian SFSR, USSR

Chess career
- Country: Russia (until 1998); Azerbaijan (since 1998)
- Title: Grandmaster (2002)
- FIDE rating: 2636 (July 2026)
- Peak rating: 2668 (May 2022)
- Peak ranking: No. 62 (January 2009)

Gadir Guseinov (Azerbaijani: Qədir Hüseynov; born 21 May 1986) is an Azerbaijani chess grandmaster. As of September 2023, he is ranked as No. 6 in Azerbaijan.

== Career ==
Born in Moscow, Guseinov started playing chess under the guidance of Shahin Hajiev. He lived in his native city and played for Russia from 1994 to 1998.

In 1994, he won the European under-10 championship in Băile Herculane.

In 2008 tied for 1st–8th with Nigel Short, Vadim Milov, Aleksej Aleksandrov, Baadur Jobava, Alexander Lastin, Tamaz Gelashvili and Farid Abbasov in the President's Cup in Baku. In April 2010, Guseinov tied for 1st-8th place in the 12th Dubai Open Chess Championship with Viorel Iordachescu, Hrant Melkumyan, Sergey Volkov, Eduardo Iturrizaga, David Arutinian, Aleksej Aleksandrov and Tornike Sanikidze. Guseinov won the Ugra Governor's Chess Blitz Cup in 2011. In 2013 he tied for 1st–3rd with Igor Kurnosov and Aleksandr Shimanov in the Nakhchivan Open.

Guseinov was nominated by FIDE president to compete in the Chess World Cup 2015 in Baku. He knocked out Maxim Matlakov and David Navara in the first two rounds before losing to Ding Liren in round 3.

Guseinov won the Sitges Open in 2018 by scoring 7.5/9 points.

== Team competitions ==
He played in the gold medal-winning Azerbaijani team at the European Team Chess Championships in Novi Sad in 2009 and in Warsaw in 2013, alongside Shahriyar Mammadyarov, Teimour Radjabov, Vugar Gashimov (in 2009), Eltaj Safarli (in 2013) and Rauf Mammadov, previously winning bronze medal in 2007 and silver in 2011.
