= Sergey Fedorchuk =

Ukrainian chess grandmaster (born 1981)

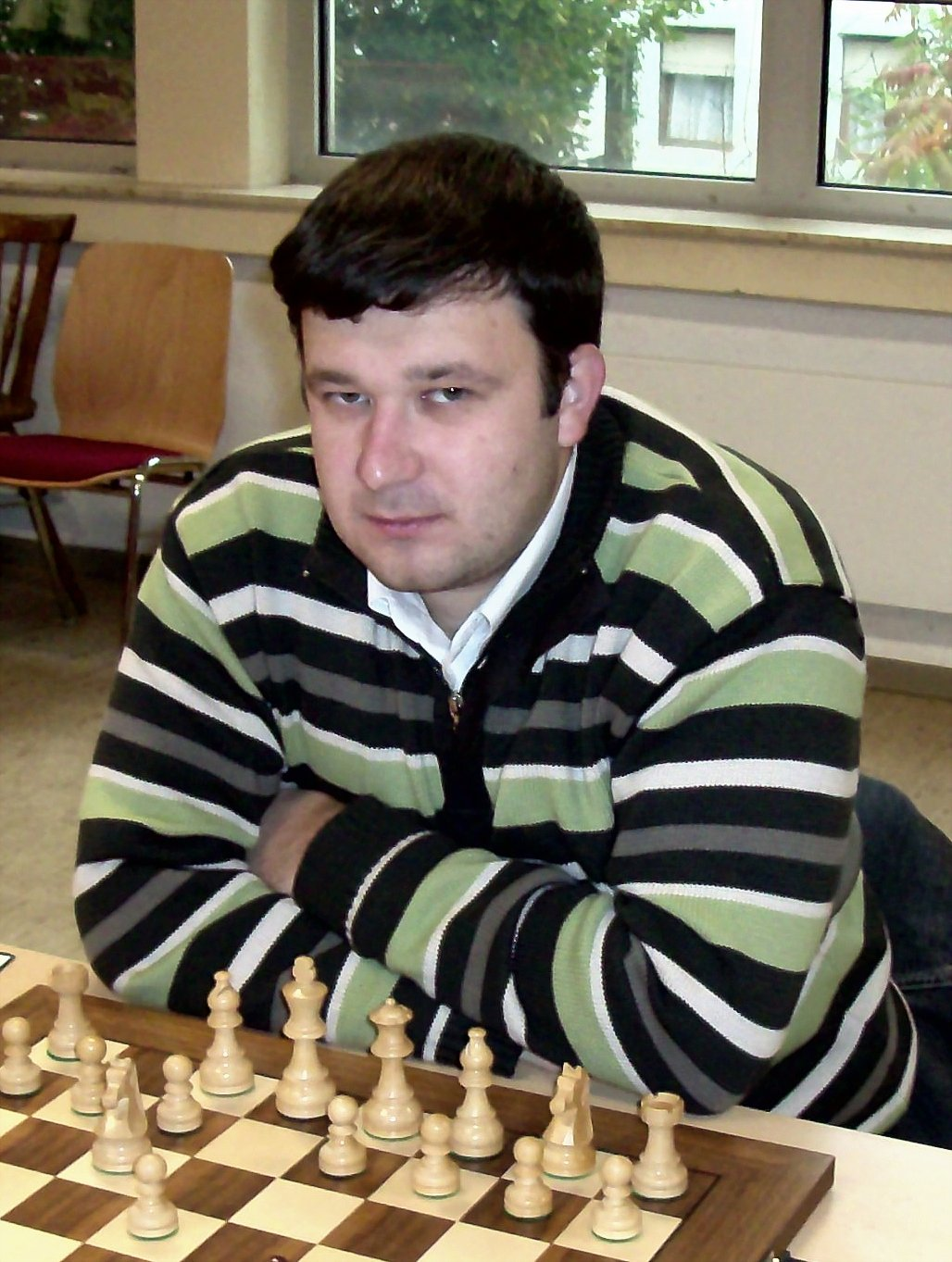

Personal information
- Born: 14 March 1981 (age 45) Vinnytsia, Ukrainian SSR, Soviet Union

Chess career
- Country: Ukraine
- Title: Grandmaster (2002)
- FIDE rating: 2593 (July 2026)
- Peak rating: 2674 (November 2010)
- Peak ranking: No. 51 (April 2008)

Sergey Anatoliyovych Fedorchuk (Ukrainian: Сергій Федорчук, romanized: Serhiy Fedorchuk; born 14 March 1981) is a Ukrainian chess player. He was awarded the title of Grandmaster by FIDE in 2002.

== Career ==
In 1995 Fedorchuk won the European Youth Chess Championship in the Under 14 category. In 2006 he won a rapid tournament held in Banyoles and shared first place with Gabriel Sargissian and Tigran L. Petrosian in the 8th Dubai Open. In 2008 he tied for 1st–8th with Vugar Gashimov, David Arutinian, Yuriy Kryvoruchko, Konstantin Chernyshov, Andrei Deviatkin, Vasilios Kotronias and Erwin L'Ami in the Cappelle-la-Grande Open tournament. In 2009 he tied for 1st–2nd with Murtas Kazhgaleyev in the Paris City Chess Championship and came first at Nantes.

He won the Paris Championship of 2012 and 2014. Fedorchuk tied for 1st–8th with Sanan Sjugirov, Parimarjan Negi, Maxim Rodshtein, Eric Hansen, Vlad-Cristian Jianu, Alexei Fedorov and Yuri Vovk in the 2013 Cappelle-la-Grande Open. In February 2014, Fedorchuk tied for first with Baadur Jobava and Mikhailo Oleksienko, placing second on tiebreak, in the David Bronstein Memorial in Minsk. Soon afterwards he won the 2014 Vladimir Petrov Memorial, a rapid tournament held in Jūrmala, Latvia.

In 2019, Fedorchuk won the 1st Barreau de Paris GM with a score of 7/9 points.

Fedorchuk played for the Ukrainian team on the reserve board in the 2013 European Team Chess Championship.

== Notable games ==
- Sergey A Fedorchuk vs Rainer Buhmann, WCh U18 Boys 1999, French Defense: Tarrasch Variation. (C09), 1-0
- Sergey A Fedorchuk vs Ivan Sokolov, World Cup 2009, Sicilian Defense: Nimzowitsch. Closed Variation (B29), 1-0
