= Vitali Koziak =

Ukrainian chess grandmaster (born 1975)

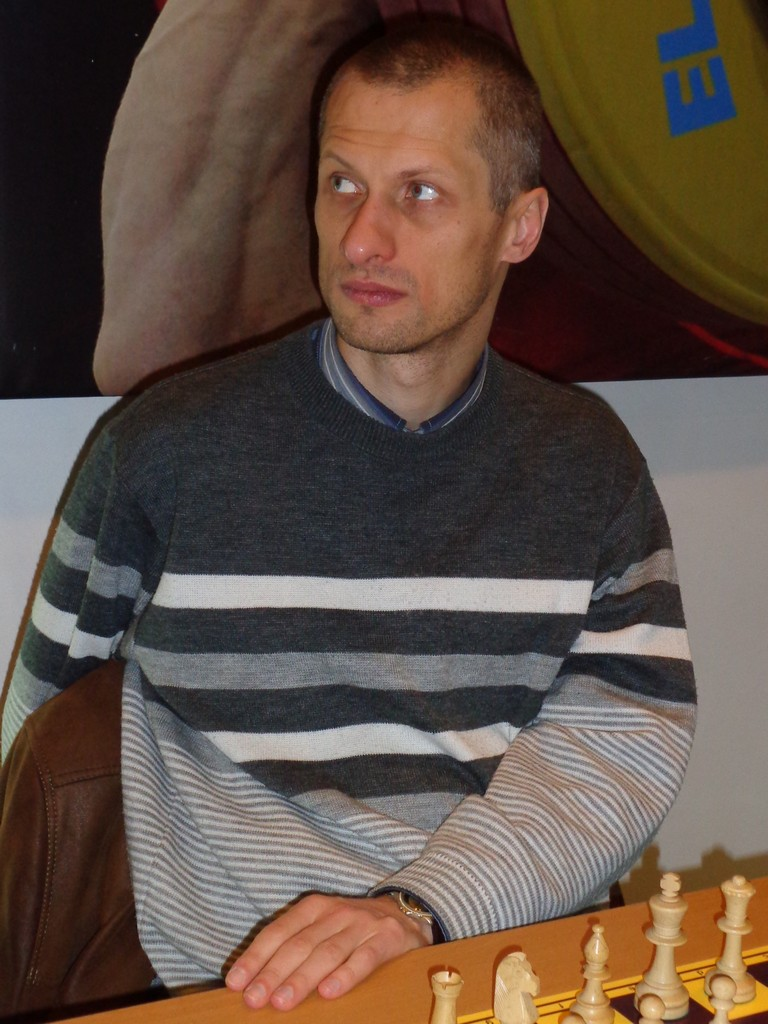
- Koziak in 2013

Personal information
- Born: January 11, 1975 (age 51)

Chess career
- Country: Ukraine
- Title: Grandmaster (2025)
- Peak rating: 2516 (August 2013)

Vitali Yaroslavovych Koziak is a Ukrainian chess grandmaster.

== Chess career ==
He has won a number of tournaments, including:

- 1998 Kedziezyn, Poland, and Uszczyki Dolne, Poland
- 2004 Rewal, Poland
- 2009 Kyiv, Ukraine
- 2010 Nachod, Czech Republic
- 2011 Ciammanace, France
- 2013 Guingamp, France
- 2014 Guingamp, France

In December 2013, he tied for first place with Namig Guliyev in the Villa de Navalmoral International Open, but was ranked in second place after tiebreak scores.

He was awarded the Grandmaster title in 2025, after achieving his norms at the:

- Druzynowe Mistrzostwa Polski - I Liga Seniorów in September 2007
- OP 1 Roma citta' aperta in December 2016
- Oskemen Open Masters in October 2024
