= Philipp Schlosser =

German chess grandmaster (born 1968)

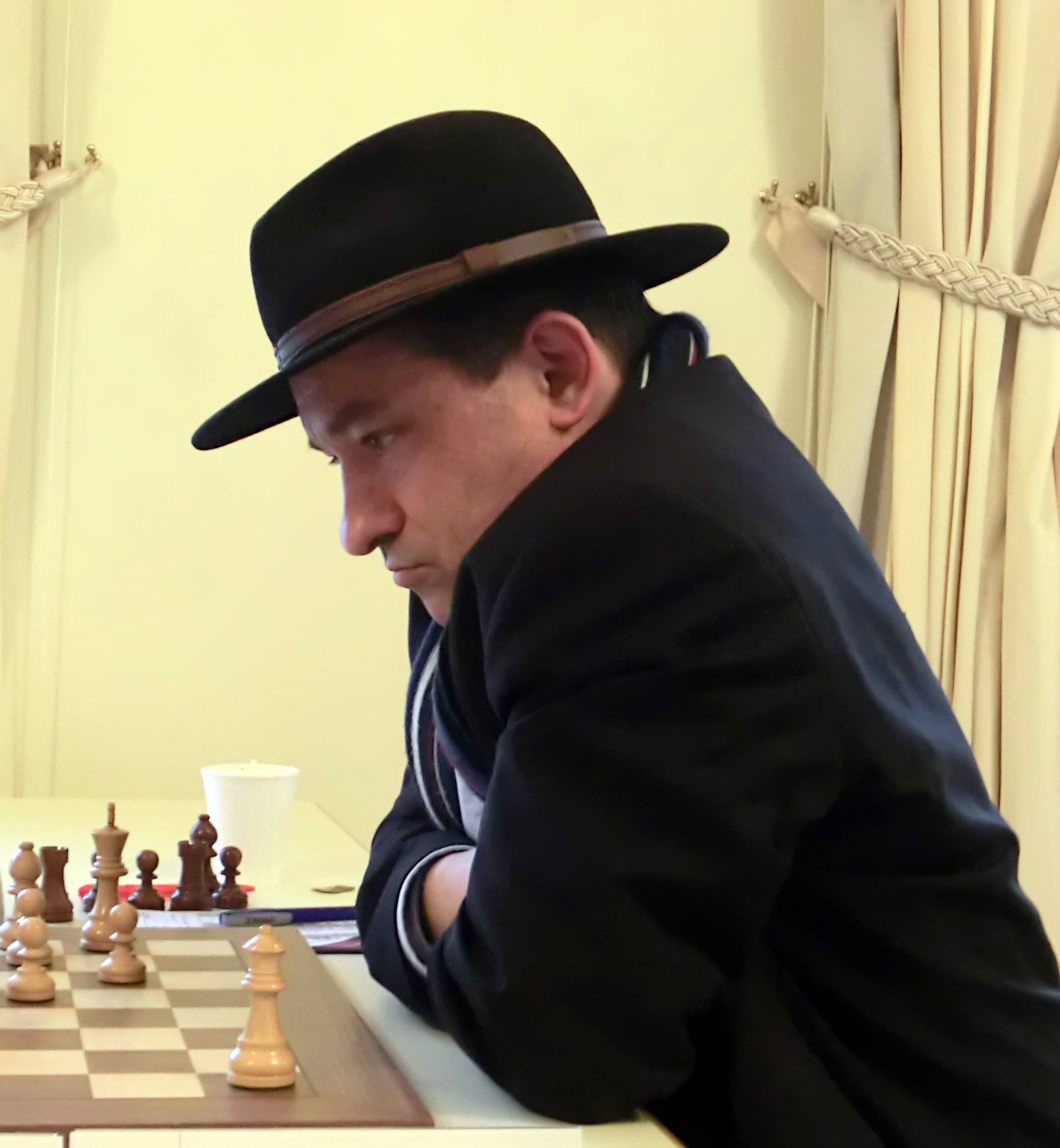
- Schlosser in 2013

Personal information
- Born: August 19, 1968 (age 57) Munich, Germany

Chess career
- Country: Germany
- Title: Grandmaster (1992)
- FIDE rating: 2445 (July 2026)
- Peak rating: 2613 (January 2014)

Philipp Schlosser is a German chess grandmaster.

== Chess career ==
In March 2003, he tied for first with Vladimir Burmakin, Eduardas Rozentalis, Dmitry Bocharov, Alexander Areshchenko, Jakov Geller, and Evgeny Miroshnichenko in the Cappelle-la-Grande Open, finishing third on tiebreak.

In September 2014, he played in the Grenke Chess Festival, where he achieved draws against higher-rated grandmasters David Baramidze, Daniel Fridman, Liviu-Dieter Nisipeanu, and Georg Meier.

In July 2018, he finished in third place at the Czech Open Rapid tournament, behind winner Vitaliy Bernadskiy and runner-up Sergei Movsesian.

In August 2025, he tied for first place with five other players at the Open Wasselonne A tournament, where he was ultimately ranked in third place. He had won the tournament in the previous year.
