= Hrant Melkumyan =

Armenian chess grandmaster (born 1989)

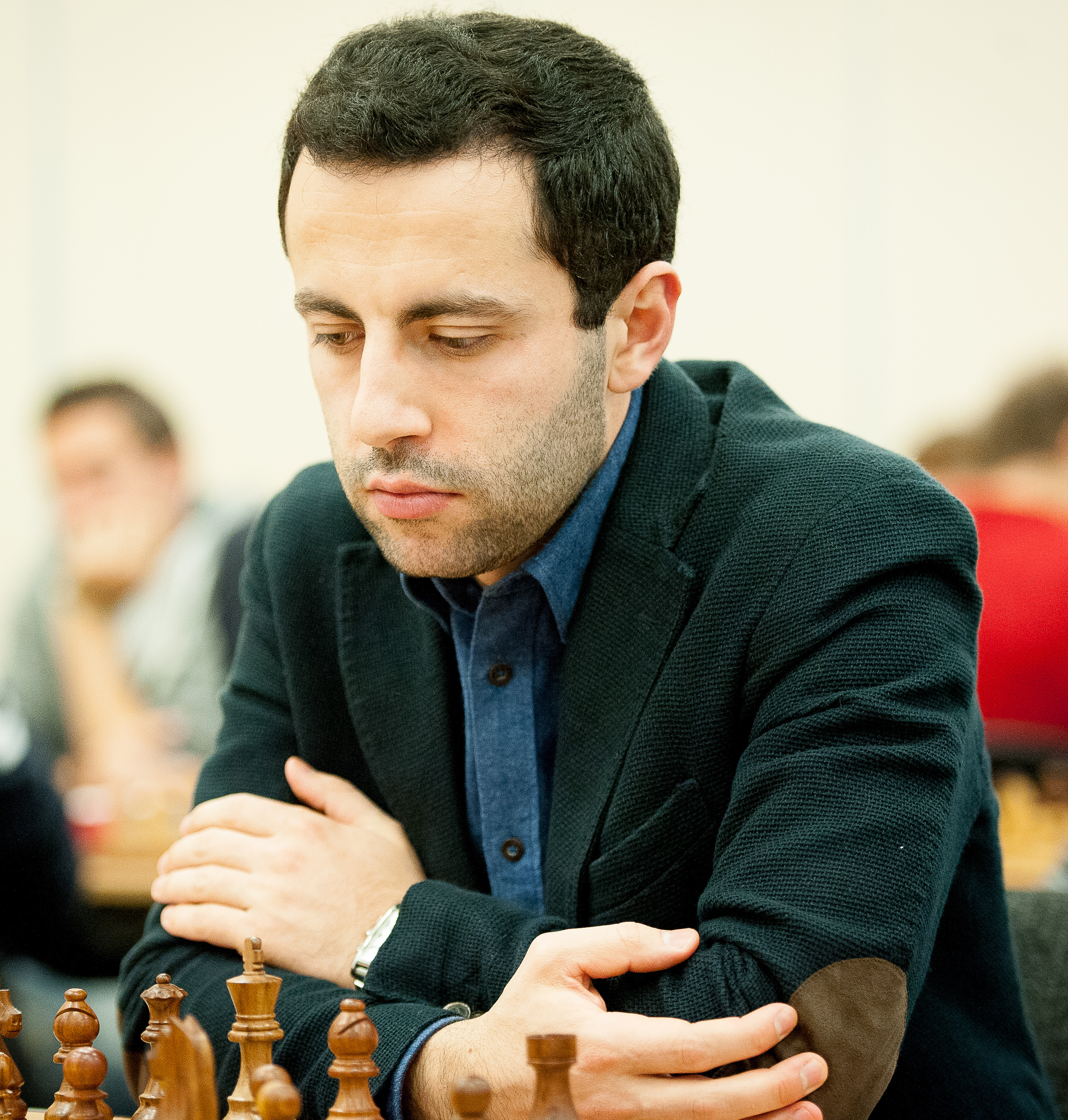
- Hrant Melkumyan in 2016

Personal information
- Born: Հրանտ Մելքումյան; April 30, 1989 (age 37) Yerevan, Armenia

Chess career
- Country: Armenia
- Title: Grandmaster (2008)
- FIDE rating: 2636 (July 2026)
- Peak rating: 2678 (September 2014)
- Peak ranking: No. 61 (September 2014)

Hrant Slavayi Melkumyan (Armenian: Հրանտ Սլավայի Մելքումյան; born April 30, 1989, in Yerevan) is an Armenian chess Grandmaster and European Blitz Champion in 2011.

== Chess career ==
He won the international Internet championship organized by the ICC chess Internet portal. In 2006, he won the U18 silver medal at the World Youth Chess Championship. In 2009, he tied for 1st–5th with Sergey Volkov, Andrey Rychagov, Andrei Deviatkin, and Zhou Weiqi in the Chigorin Memorial. In 2010, tied for 1st–8th with Sergey Volkov, Viorel Iordăchescu, Eduardo Iturrizaga, Gadir Guseinov, David Arutinian, Aleksej Aleksandrov, and Tornike Sanikidze in the 12th Dubai Open. In 2011, he tied for 2nd–4th with Borki Predojević and Mircea Pârligras in 41st International Bosna Tournament in Sarajevo; tied for 1st–2nd with Baadur Jobava in the Lake Sevan tournament in Martuni and finished second on tie-break; tied for 3rd–15th in the open section of the 15th Corsican Circuit. In December 2011 Melkumyan tied for 1st–3rd with Alexey Dreev and Radosław Wojtaszek in the European Blitz Chess Championship and won the event on tie-break. In January 2012 he won the 2nd Armenian Chess960 Championship and in February 2012 tied for 4th–8th with Alexander Khalifman, Maxim Rodshtein, Fabiano Caruana, and Dmitry Andreikin in the 11th Aeroflot Open. In 2013 he tied for 1st–8th with Alexander Moiseenko, Evgeny Romanov, Alexander G Beliavsky, Constantin Lupulescu, Francisco Vallejo Pons, Sergei Movsesian, Ian Nepomniachtchi, Alexey Dreev, and Evgeny Alekseev in the European Individual Chess Championship. On February 21, 2014, Melkumyan won the Casino Graz International held in Graz, Austria. In June 2014, he won International Chess Tournament Teplice Open in Czech Republic. On July 12, 2014, Melkumyan won the XXXIV Open International Villa de Benasque held in Benasque, Spain. In August 2014, he won the Riga Technical University Open with a score of 7,5/9. In 2017, he shared 1st–3rd places with Gabriel Sargissian and Sebastien Maze in 9th CSC London Chess Classic FIDE Open.

His handle on the Internet Chess Club is "Pchyolka". and he currently resides in Canberra, Australia.
