= Vasily Yemelin =

Russian chess grandmaster (born 1976)

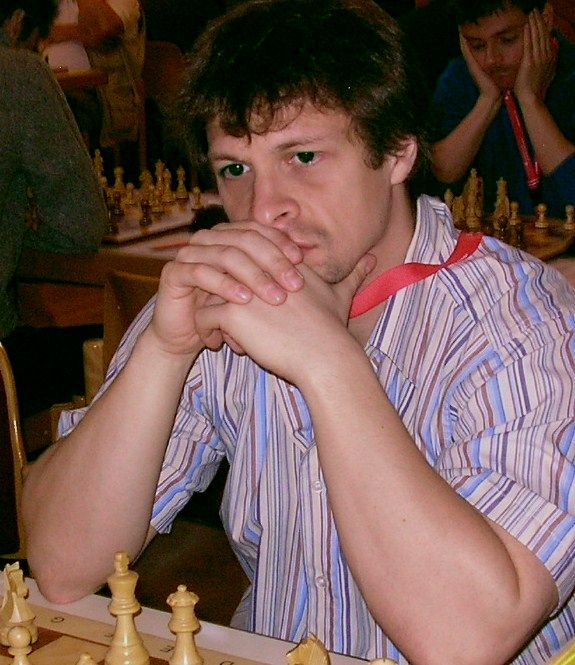
- Yemelin in Deizisau, 2011

Personal information
- Born: February 1, 1976 (age 50) Leningrad, Soviet Union

Chess career
- Country: Russia
- Title: Grandmaster (1994)
- FIDE rating: 2526 (October 2026)
- Peak rating: 2592 (July 2011)

Vasily Vladimirovich Yemelin (Russian: Василий Владимирович Емелин; born 1 February 1976) is a Russian chess player. He was awarded the title Grandmaster by FIDE in 1994. Yemelin won the championship of Saint Petersburg three times, in 1993, 2002 and 2011. He participated in two Chess Olympiads, in 1994 and 1996, playing for Russia B team on both occasions. In 1994 he won the team bronze medal.

== Chess career ==
Yemelin won the Wichern Open in 1999. He won the Rijeka Open in 2001. In February 2007, he shared first place with Evgeny Najer in the Moscow Open scoring 7½/9 points. He finished second on tiebreak score. One month later, Yemelin finished tied for first place with Wang Yue, Vugar Gashimov, David Arutinian and Yuri Drozdovskij in the Cappelle-la-Grande Open scoring 7/9 points. He ended in sixth place on tiebreak. In 2009, Yemelin shared first place with Alexey Dreev in the Paul Keres Memorial Tournament in Tallinn, Estonia, held with the rapidplay time control.
