= Namig Guliyev =

Azerbaijani chess grandmaster (born 1974)

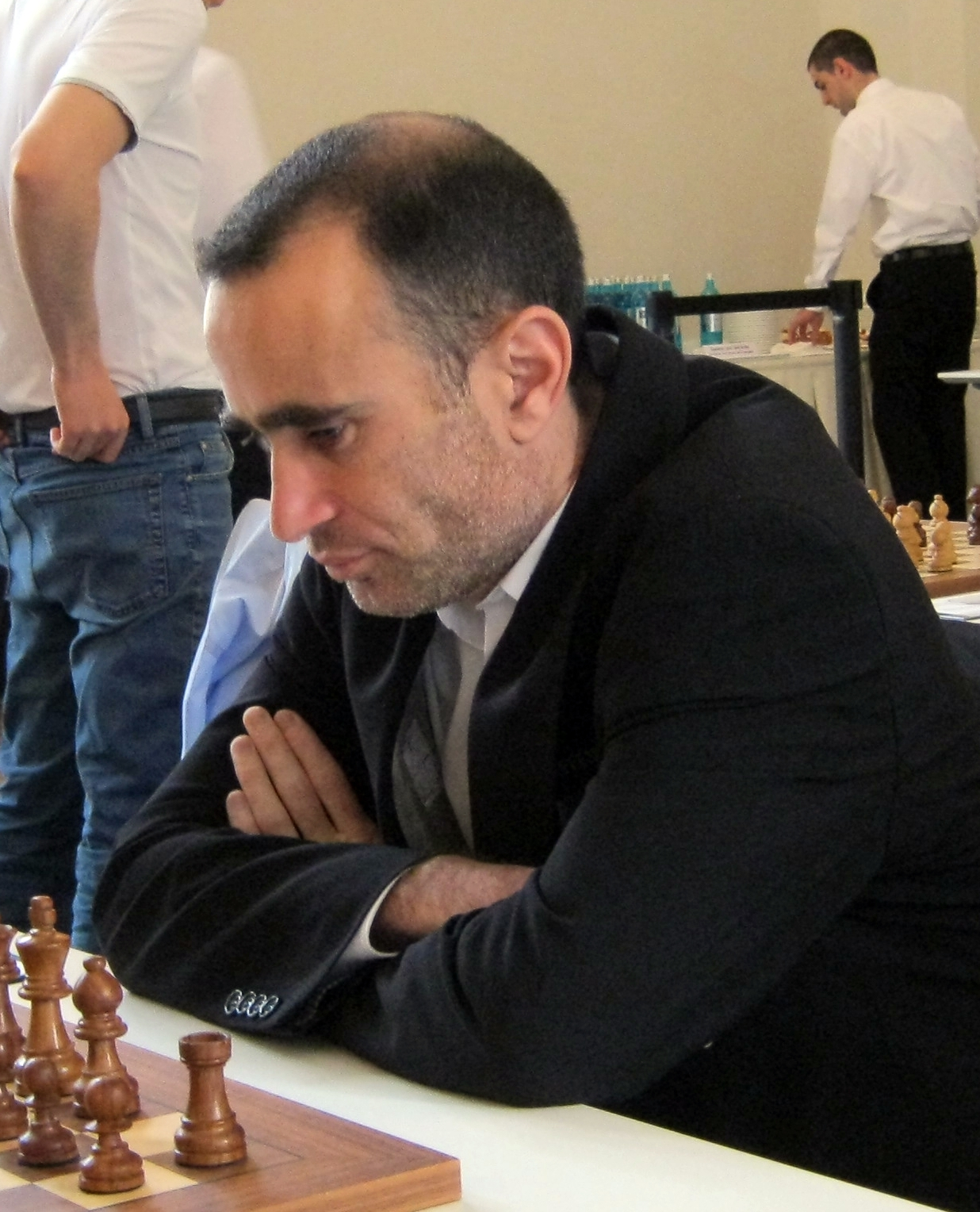

Personal information
- Born: Namiq Quliyev; 13 February 1974 (age 52) Beylagan, Azerbaijan SSR, Soviet Union

Chess career
- Country: Azerbaijan
- Title: Grandmaster (2005)
- FIDE rating: 2444 (July 2026)
- Peak rating: 2590 (April 2007)

Namig Guliyev (Azerbaijani: Namiq Quliyev; born 13 February 1974) is an Azerbaijani chess player. He holds the title of Grandmaster, which FIDE awarded him in 2005.

== Career ==
In 2003 Guliyev came in first at Bischwiller. In 2005, he tied for 1st–4th places with Oleg Korneev, Andrei Sokolov and Azer Mirzoev at Béthune. In 2009, Guliyev tied for 1st–3rd with Friso Nijboer and Adam Horvath at Metz. In 2010, tied for 1st–3rd with Valentin Panbukchian and Vladimir Malaniuk at Malakoff. In 2012, he won the Open of Plancoët. Guliyev tied for first place with Miguoel Admiraal, Sergey Fedorchuk, Maxime Lagarde and Jules Moussard in the Cappelle-la-Grande Open in 2019.

He played for team Azerbaijan in the Chess Olympiads of 1994, 2006 and 2016.

He has been an active Twitch streamer since 2020, streaming online chess games.
