= Darius Ruželė =

Lithuanian chess grandmaster (born 1968)

Personal information
- Born: 27 April 1968 (age 58)

Chess career
- Country: Soviet Union; Lithuania
- Title: Grandmaster (1996)
- FIDE rating: 2531 (July 2026)
- Peak rating: 2550 (January 2001)

Darius Ruželė (born 27 April 1968) is a Lithuanian chess player who holds the title of Grandmaster (GM, 1996). He is Lithuanian Chess Championship silver (1992, 2000) and bronze (1988, 1993, 1998, 2001) medalist.

== Biography ==
The first significant success was in 1986, when Darius Ruželė won the Soviet Union Junior Chess Championship. From early 1990s to 2002 he was one of the top Lithuanian chess players.

From 1987 to 2002, Darius Ruželė regularly participated in the Lithuanian Chess Championships. In 1988, he shared 1st place in this tournament with Vitalijus Majorovas and Gintautas Piešina but remained in 3rd place according to additional indicators. In 1992 Darius Ruželė won silver medal in the Lithuanian Chess Championship. After one year he repeated this success. In 1998 Darius Ruželė won bronze medal in the Lithuanian Chess Championship. In 2000 he shared 1st–6th place in the Lithuanian Chess Championship but remained in 2nd place according to additional indicators. In 2001 Darius Ruželė won bronze medal in the Lithuanian Chess Championship.

In 1993 in Vilnius Darius Ruželė ranked in 3rd place in FIDE World Chess Championship Baltic Zonal tournament.

In 1994 he shared the 1st place in Open Chess tournament in Münster. In 1996 Darius Ruželė achieved great success, winning (before Mikhail Gurevich) in Bonn. In 2000 Darius Ruželė won Open Chess tournament in Gelsenkirchen. In 2007 he shared the first place (together with Tony Miles and Vladimir Burmakin among others) in Cappelle-la-Grande Open.

Darius Ruželė played for Lithuania in the Chess Olympiads:

- In 1992, at second reserve board in the 30th Chess Olympiad in Manila (+4, =6, −1),
- In 1994, at second reserve board in the 31st Chess Olympiad in Moscow (+5, =3, −3),
- In 1996, at reserve board in the 32nd Chess Olympiad in Yerevan (+3, =5, −2),
- In 1998, at reserve board in the 33rd Chess Olympiad in Elista (+3, =4, −1),
- In 2000, at second board in the 34th Chess Olympiad in Istanbul (+5, =4, −1).

Darius Ruželė played for Lithuania in the European Team Chess Championship:

- In 1992, at fourth board in the 10th European Team Chess Championship in Debrecen (+2, =3, −3).

Darius Ruželė also four times played for Lithuanian chess clubs in European Chess Club Cups (1994–1996, 1998).

In 1988 Darius Ruželė awarded Master of Sports of the USSR in chess title. In 1993, he was awarded the FIDE International Master (IM) title and received the FIDE Grandmaster (GM) title three years later.

After 2002, he no longer participates in chess tournaments.
