= Evgeniy Najer =

Russian chess grandmaster (born 1977)

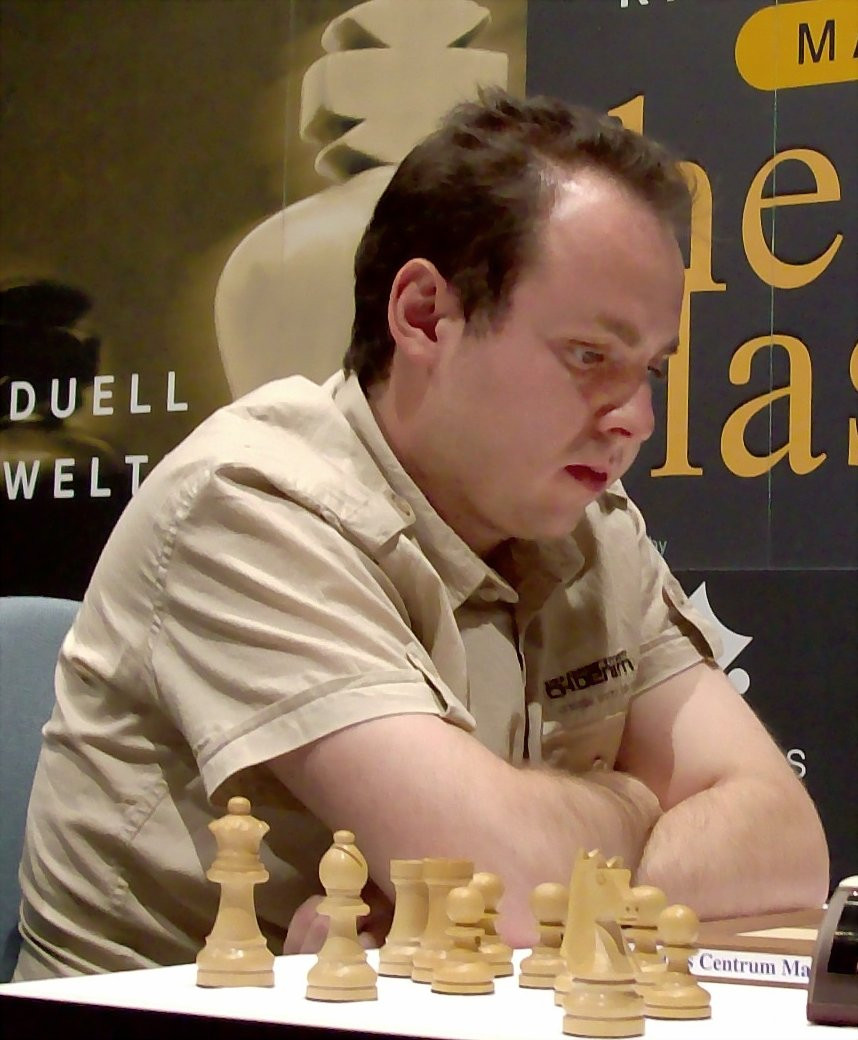
- Najer in 2008

Personal information
- Born: Evgeniy Yuryevich Najer; 22 June 1977 (age 49) Moscow, Russian SFSR, Soviet Union

Chess career
- Country: Russia (until 2022); FIDE (since 2022)
- Title: Grandmaster (1999)
- FIDE rating: 2580 (July 2026)
- Peak rating: 2707 (August 2017)
- Peak ranking: No. 27 (July 2006)

Evgeniy Yuryevich Najer (Russian: Евгений Юревич Наер; born 22 June 1977) is a Russian chess grandmaster and the European champion of 2015. He is also one of the coaches of the Russian women's national team.

== Career ==
He won the Moscow City Chess Championship in 1998 and 2003. In 2002 he shared the victory of the U.S. Open Chess Championship with Gennadi Zaichik.

Najer won the Cappelle-la-Grande Open of 2004 on tiebreak over Kaido Külaots, Artyom Timofeev, Zoltan Gyimesi, Sergey Grigoriants and Oleg Korneev. In the same year he tied for 1st–3rd with Michael Roiz and Leonid Gofshtein in the Ashdod Chess Festival.

He won a gold medal at the 2005 Maccabiah Games in Israel. In 2007 he won the 3rd Moscow Open edging out on tiebreak Vasily Yemelin.

Najer won the World Open in Philadelphia consecutively in 2008 and 2009. He was one of the seconds of Gata Kamsky in his 2009 match against Veselin Topalov ("Challenger Match"). In July 2009, Najer won the strong rapid round-robin tournament, whose field included Boris Gelfand and Judit Polgar among others, of the Richard Riordan Chess Festival at the 2009 Maccabiah Games. Soon afterwards, in the same month, he tied for first with Robert Fontaine in the Paleochora Open Tournament. In 2010, he tied for 2nd–5th with Michael Adams, Victor Mikhalevski and Jiří Štoček the 14th Chicago Open.

In 2015 he won the European Individual Chess Championship in Jerusalem with 8½/11. This victory qualified him for the Chess World Cup 2015, where he was eliminated in the first round by Rauf Mamedov. Najer won the 2016 Aeroflot Open edging out Boris Gelfand on tiebreak, after both scored 6½/9 points; this achievement earned him a spot in the 2016 Dortmund Sparkassen Chess Meeting. In 2017, he tied for first place with Emil Sutovsky in the 18th Karpov Chess Tournament in Poikovsky, Russia. In 2019, whilst competing at the FIDE Grand Swiss Tournament 2019, Najer created a first round upset defeating Viswanathan Anand in 30 moves, the fourth seeded player in the tournament and former world chess champion.

== Personal life ==
Najer is Jewish.

Together with 43 other Russian elite chess players, Najer signed an open letter to Russian president Vladimir Putin, protesting against the 2022 Russian invasion of Ukraine and expressing solidarity with the Ukrainian people.
