= Vladislav Bakhmatsky =

Ukrainian chess player (born 1998)

- Bakhmatsky in 2025

Personal information
- Born: August 1, 1998 (age 28) Luhansk, Ukraine

Chess career
- Country: Ukraine
- Title: International Master (2019)
- FIDE rating: 2451 (November 2026)
- Peak rating: 2477 (January 2023)

Vladislav Serhiyovych Bakhmatsky is a Ukrainian chess player.

== Chess career ==
In March 2016, he won the U18 Ukrainian Championship.

In February 2022, he won the Cappelle-la-Grande Open after having a better tiebreak score than the other seven players with whom he had tied for first place.

In October 2022, he won the Anfield Cup, defeating grandmaster Alexey Kislinsky in the final round to finish half a point ahead of the field.

In December 2025, he won the Ukrainian Chess Championship held in Lviv, with a score of 7½/9.
