= Sergey Volkov (chess player) =

Russian chess grandmaster (born 1974)

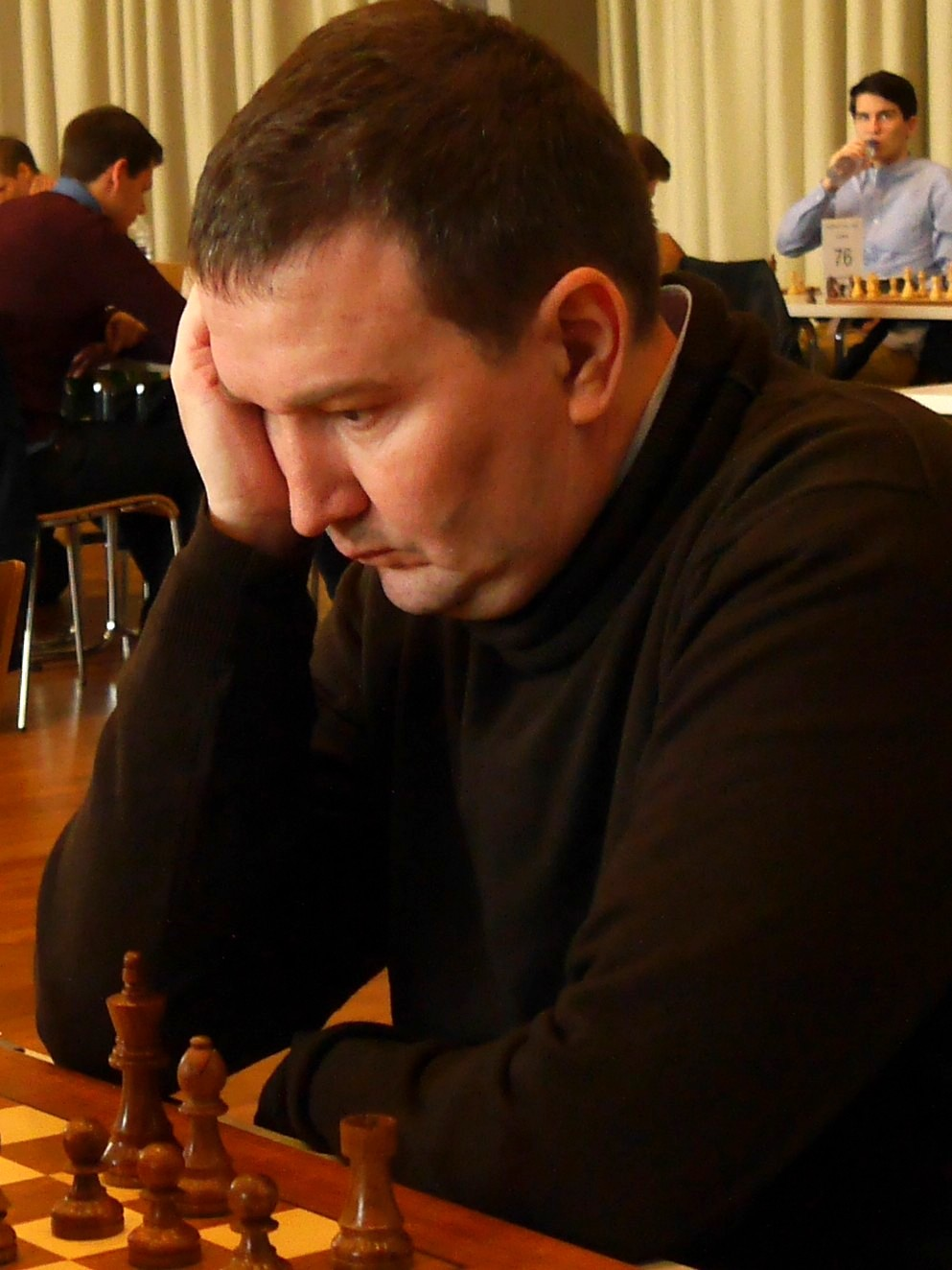

Personal information
- Born: Sergey Viktorovich Volkov; 7 February 1974 (age 52) Saransk, Russian SFSR, Soviet Union

Chess career
- Country: Russia
- Title: Grandmaster (1998)
- Peak rating: 2659 (July 2007)
- Peak ranking: No. 47 (October 2002)

Sergey Viktorovich Volkov (Russian: Серге́й Ви́кторович Во́лков; born 7 February 1974) is a Russian chess grandmaster. He was Russian champion in 2000. Volkov competed in the FIDE World Championship in 2000, 2002, and 2004, and in the FIDE World Cup in 2007.

== Career ==
Volkov won the Chigorin Memorial in 1998 and in the following year, he was joint winner with Alexander Grischuk. He won it again in 2009.

In 2000, Volkov won the Russian Chess Championship in Samara. He tied for second place at the 2002 European Individual Chess Championship in Batumi, eventually placing third behind Bartłomiej Macieja and Mikhail Gurevich on a tie-break. He shared victory at the 2005 Rilton Cup with Evgeny Gleizerov and Emanuel Berg. In 2010/11, Volkov took a clear first place with 8/9 in the 40th Rilton Cup.

In 2008 he won the bronze medal at the European Individual Championship for the second time in his career. In 2010, Volkov tied for 1st–8th with Viorel Iordachescu, Hrant Melkumyan, Eduardo Iturrizaga, Gadir Guseinov, David Arutinian, Aleksej Aleksandrov and Tornike Sanikidze in the 12th Dubai Open. Volkov came second in the 15th Dubai Open in 2013.

=== Team events ===
In team events he has twice represented Russia in major tournaments. At the 1998 Chess Olympiad, while still an International Master, he played for Russia 2 team that finished eighth. At the 1999 European Team Chess Championship, he was played board 2 for the first team, which placed fifth.

For his then club side Mikhail Chigorin of Saint Petersburg he contributed to a second-place finish at the European Club Cup, held in Neum in 2000. In the process, he earned himself an individual silver medal and an Elo rating performance of 2743. He has also played in the French Nationale first league.

Sergey Volkov became a grandmaster in 1998, following on from his Olympiad appearance in the same year.

Preceded by Konstantin Sakaev	Russian Chess Champion; 2000	Succeeded by Alexander Motylev
