= Waldemar Hanasz =

Polish chess player (born 1958)

Personal information
- Born: August 1, 1958 (age 68)

Chess career
- Country: Poland
- Peak rating: 2315 (July 1987)

Waldemar Hanasz is a Polish chess player.

== Chess career ==
Hanasz won the inaugural edition of the Cappelle-la-Grande Open tournament in 1985.

In 1991, he played for Pembroke College's chess team on the top board, helping them to win their division and get promoted to the next division.

In June 2022, he won a statuette for distinguished players in the BKS Chemik Bydgoszcz tournament.
