= Jakov Geller =

Russian chess grandmaster (born 1986)

Personal information
- Born: August 11, 1986 (age 39) Moscow, Russian SFSR, Soviet Union

Chess career
- Country: Russia
- Title: Grandmaster (2011)
- FIDE rating: 2521 (July 2026)
- Peak rating: 2569 (January 2013)

Jakov Vladimirovich Geller is a Russian chess grandmaster.

== Chess career ==
In 2003, he tied for first place in the Cappelle-la-Grande Open.

In August 2011, he tied for first place in the 100 Years of Mikhail Botvinnik chess festival in St. Petersburg.

In 2019, he won the Mark Dvoretsky coaching prize.

He won the 2020-21 Samuel Reshevsky Award for the best achievement by a junior prodigy. He is one of Russia's top modern coaches, and his students have included grandmasters Ivan Bukavshin and Alexandr Predke.

In 2021, he wrote a book titled 1,500 Forced Mates, published by Elk and Ruby.
