= Momchil Nikolov =

Bulgarian chess grandmaster

Personal information
- Born: March 3, 1985 (age 41)

Chess career
- Country: Bulgaria
- Title: Grandmaster (2010)
- FIDE rating: 2421 (July 2026)
- Peak rating: 2589 (July 2011)

Momchil Nikolov (born 1985) is a Bulgarian chess grandmaster.

He earned his International Master title in 2007, and grandmaster title in 2010.

He won the Bulgarian Chess Championship in 2016, and has also won a number of strong open tournaments including Glasgow 2012, Monthey 2012, Apokoronas 2015, Albena Vivacom 2015, Guingamp 2016, Albena 2016, Primorsko 2016, Lille 2017, Athens 2017, Primorsko 2017, Noisiel 2018, Capelle-la-Grande 2018 (joint winner), Athens 2018, Heusenstamm 2018 and Guingamp 2019 .
