= Jean-Marc Degraeve =

French chess grandmaster (born 1971)

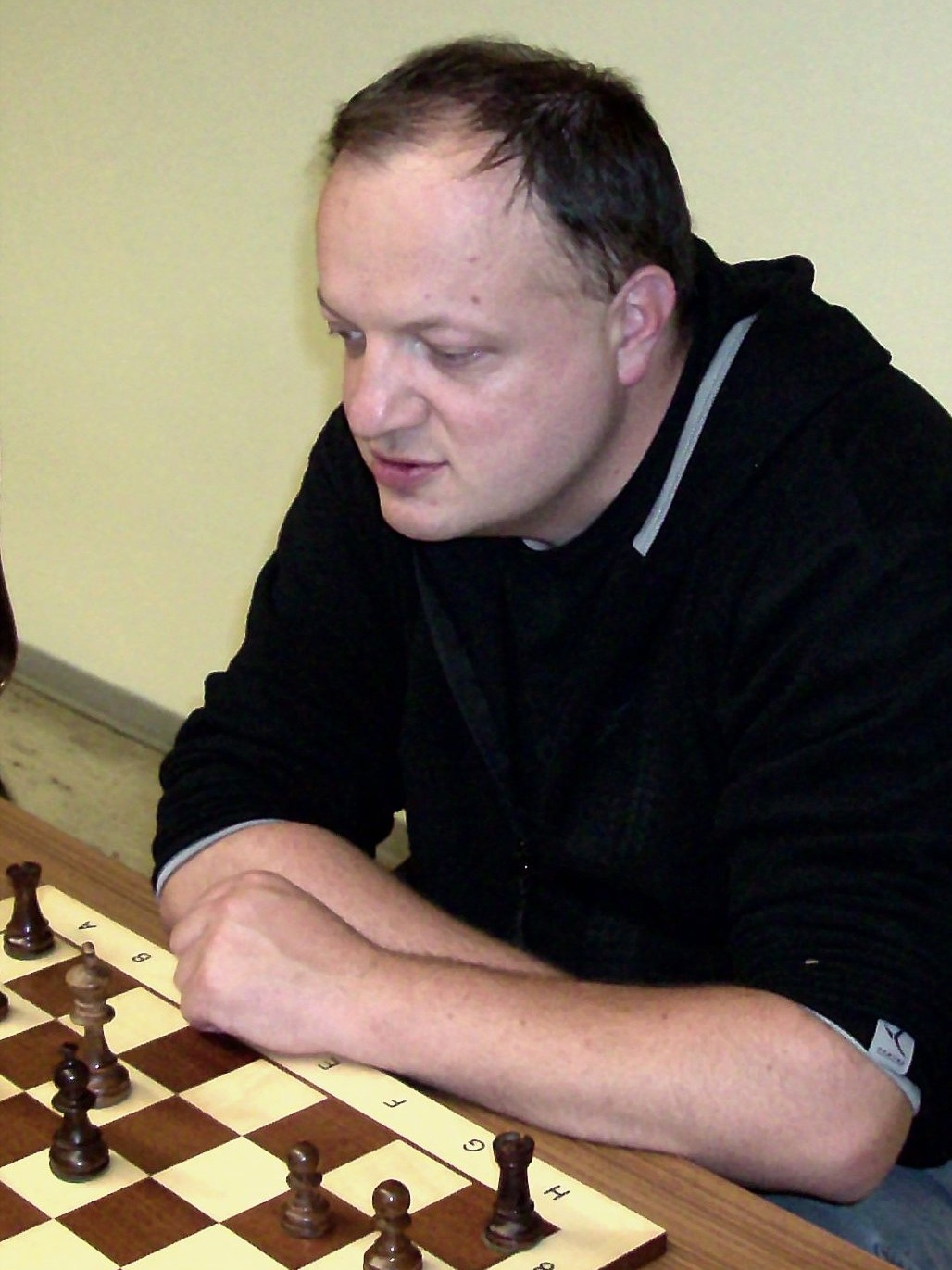

Personal information
- Born: 26 January 1971 (age 55) Tourcoing, France

Chess career
- Country: France
- Title: Grandmaster (1998)
- FIDE rating: 2500 (July 2026)
- Peak rating: 2602 (July 2001)
- Peak ranking: No. 85 (July 2001)

Jean-Marc Degraeve (born 26 January 1971) is a French chess player. He was awarded the title of Grandmaster by FIDE in 1998.

== Career ==
Degraeve won the French junior championship in 1987, and had attained the title of International Master in 1991, followed by that of Grandmaster in 1998. In 2017 he won the Cappelle-la-Grande Open with a score of 8 points out of 9.

In team competitions, Degraeve played for France at Chess Olympiad, European Team Chess Championship and Mitropa Cup. At the 2004 Olympiad, held in Calvià, he won an individual bronze medal playing on the first reserve board.
