= Vitaly Maiorov =

Lithuanian chess player (1961–1997)

Personal information
- Born: 6 April 1961 Plungė, Lithuania
- Died: 1997 Vilnius, Lithuania

Chess career
- Country: Soviet Union; Lithuania
- Title: International Master (1987)
- Peak rating: 2450 (July 1978)

Vitaly Maiorov (Russian: Виталий Иванович Майоров; Lithuanian: Vitalijus Majorovas; 6 April 1961 – 1997) was a Lithuanian chess player with Russian origin who holds the title of International Master (IM, 1987). He was Lithuanian Chess Championship silver (1982, 1988, 1989, 1990) and bronze (1977, 1979, 1985) medalist.

== Biography ==
From 1977 to 1991, Vitaly Maiorov regularly participated in the Lithuanian Chess Championships. In 1988, he shared 1st place in this tournament with Gintautas Piešina and Darius Ruželė but remained in 2nd place according to additional indicators. Also he won three silver (1982, 1989, 1990) and three bronze (1977, 1979, 1985) medals in this championships. Vitaly Maiorov played for Lithuania in Soviet Team Chess Championships (1979, 1983–1986), and in 1979 he won individual gold medal. In 1986, he won International Chess Tournament Kaunas Cup.

In 1979 Vitaly Maiorov awarded Master of Sports of the USSR in chess title. In 1987, he was awarded the FIDE International Master (IM) title.

In 1984 Vitaly Maiorov graduated from Vilnius University with a degree in economic cybernetics. He worked in the Ministry of Economy of the Lithuania.

From 1992 to 1995 Vitaly Maiorov worked as a trainer in the United Arab Emirates. As the head coach of the United Arab Emirates national team, he participated in the World Junior Team Chess Championship.
