= Vladimir Chuchelov =

Belgian chess grandmaster (born 1969)

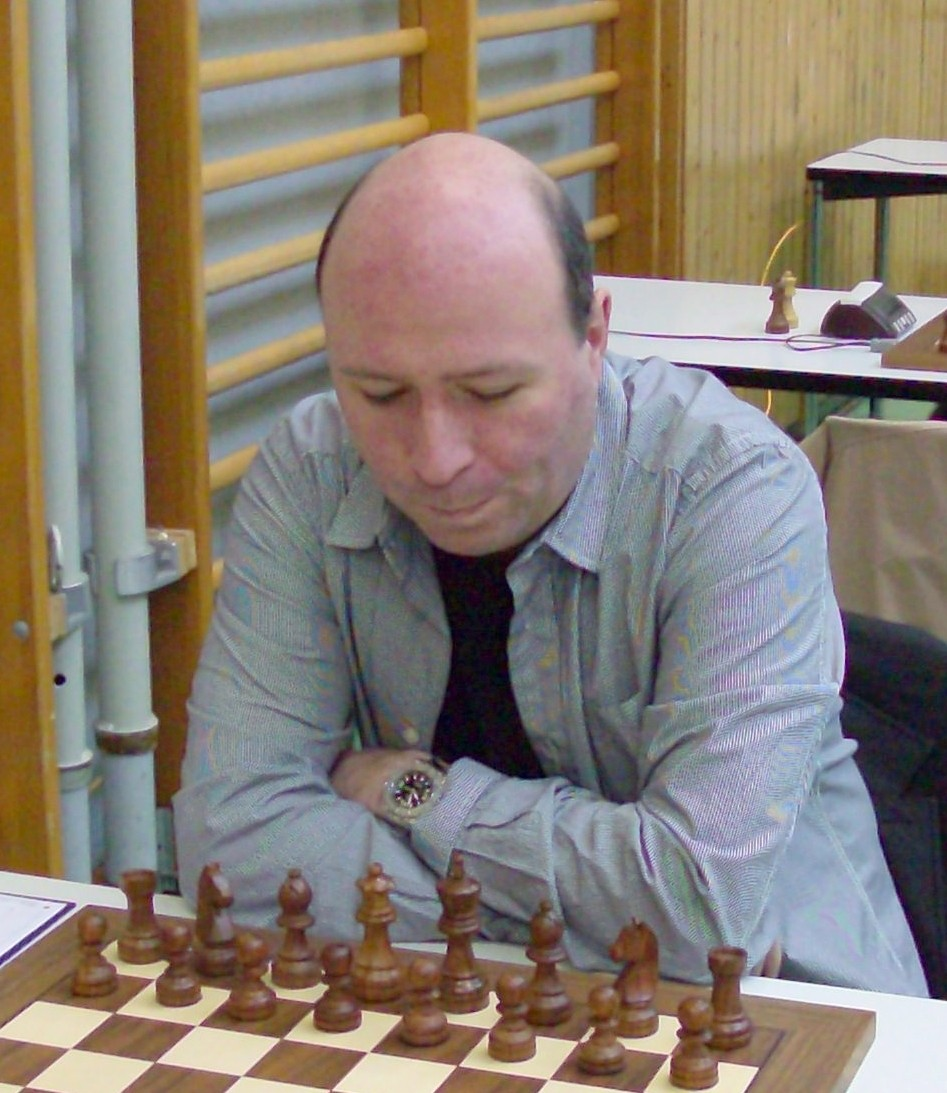
- Chuchelov in 2008

Personal information
- Born: 28 September 1969 (age 56) Moscow, Russian SFSR, Soviet Union

Chess career
- Country: Soviet Union (until 1991); Belgium (since 1991)
- Title: Grandmaster (1995)
- FIDE rating: 2554 (July 2026)
- Peak rating: 2608 (July 2003)
- Peak ranking: No. 75 (July 2001)

Vladimir Chuchelov (Russian: Владимир Чучелов; born 28 September 1969 in Moscow) is a Belgian chess grandmaster and professional trainer.

== Biography ==
He won the Belgian Chess Championship in 2000. He appeared four times in the FIDE top 100, with a peak rating of 2608. Tournament victories include number of international tournaments, among them the Hamburg HSK (1991), Gifhorn international (1992), Cappelle-la-Grande Open (1994 and 2001). He made his 1st appearance as a coach in the famous international Wijk aan Zee tournament 2002, helping Dutch grandmaster Jeroen Piket. One year later he started his collaboration with another Dutch grandmaster, Loek van Wely. From 2009 he worked for four years as the head coach of the Royal Dutch Federation. In 2010 he was awarded the title of FIDE Senior Trainer. In 2013 received the Botvinnik Medal as best man's trainer 2013. He has coached international stars including Fabiano Caruana for five years (2011-2015) and Anish Giri for four years (2010-2013). He has also trained former women's world champion and grandmaster Hou Yifan. Chuchelov was Hou's second in the Women's World Chess Championship 2016.
