= Jules Moussard =

French chess grandmaster (born 1995)

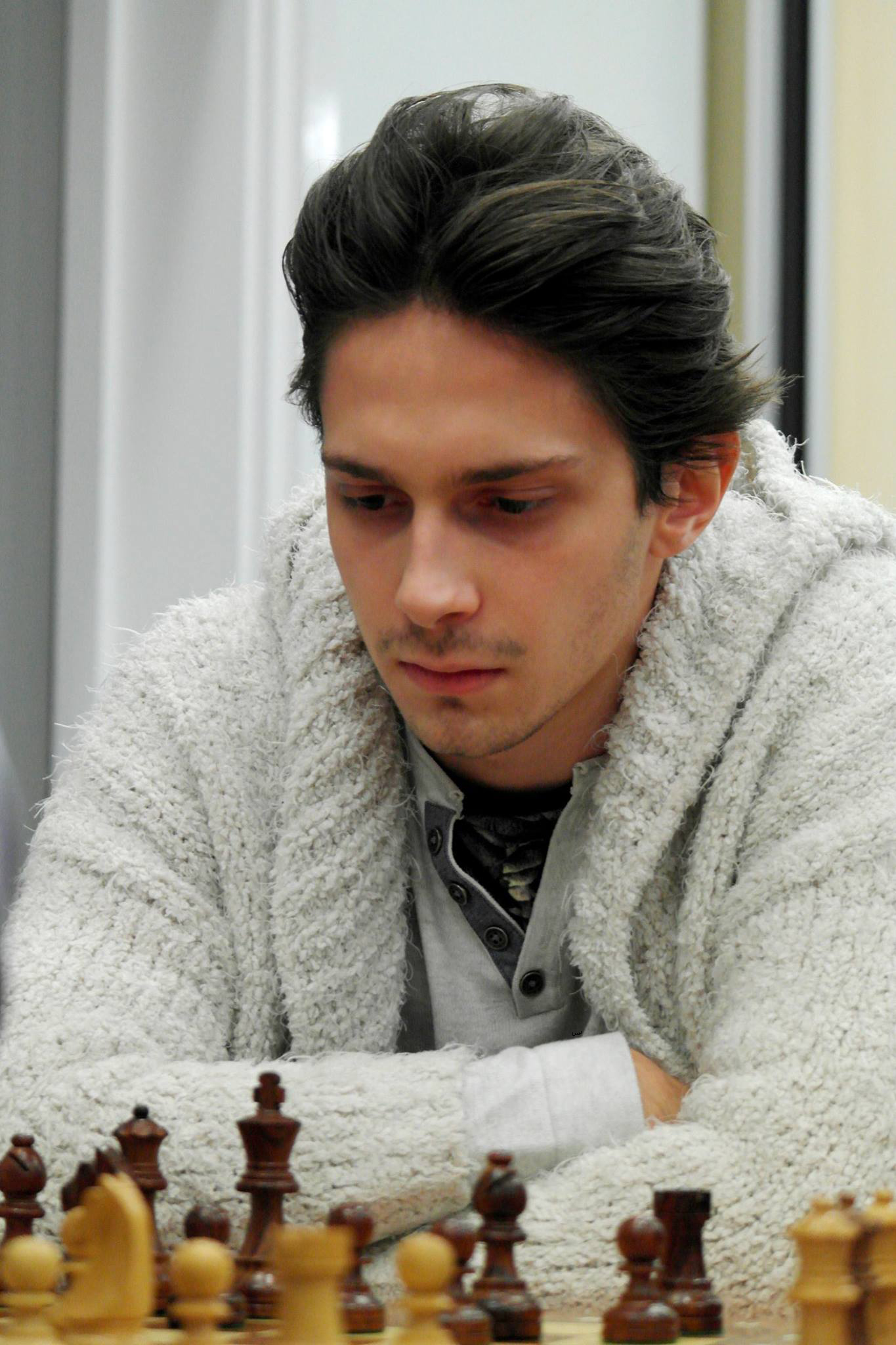
- Jules Moussard in 2016

Personal information
- Born: 16 January 1995 (age 31) Paris, France

Chess career
- Country: France
- Title: Grandmaster (2016)
- FIDE rating: 2606 (July 2026)
- Peak rating: 2686 (September 2022)
- Peak ranking: No. 51 (September 2022)

Jules Moussard (French pronunciation: [ʒyl musaʁ]; born 16 January 1995) is a French chess player. He holds the title of Grandmaster, which FIDE awarded him in 2016.

== Career ==
Born in Paris, Moussard won seven titles at the French youth championships. He is the only player to have won a title in every age category, including the adult championship since his 2022 victory in finals against Étienne Bacrot. In 2002, he won his first title in the French under-8 championship in Hyères, in front of Jacques Netzer. At the under-10 championship in Reims in 2004 he finished behind Stéphane Staatdjian, but won in the same age category the next year in Calvi. In 2006 in Aix-les-Bains, he won the under-12 title. He returned to this city in 2009 to win his fourth title, this time in the under-14 category. Two years later, he won the under-16 championship. Then in Nîmes in 2012, he won the under-18 championship ahead of Christophe Soshacki and Quentin Loiseau. In 2015 in Pau he won his seventh and last French youth championship in the under-20 division, ahead of Pierre Barbot and Raphaël Dutreuil.

Moussard won the silver medal at the World Youth Championships in the Under-10 category in 2004, tied with Yu Yangyi (gold medallist), Hou Yifan (bronze medallist) and Raymond Song (fourth). He received the title FIDE Master for this result.

He was awarded the title of International Master in 2011. FIDE awarded him the title of Grandmaster in 2016. Moussard won the Paris championship in 2016 and 2018. Also in 2018, he won the London Chess Classic FIDE Open on tiebreak score over Nicholas Pert, after both players scored 7½ points out of 9.
