= Parimarjan Negi =

Indian chess grandmaster (born 1993)

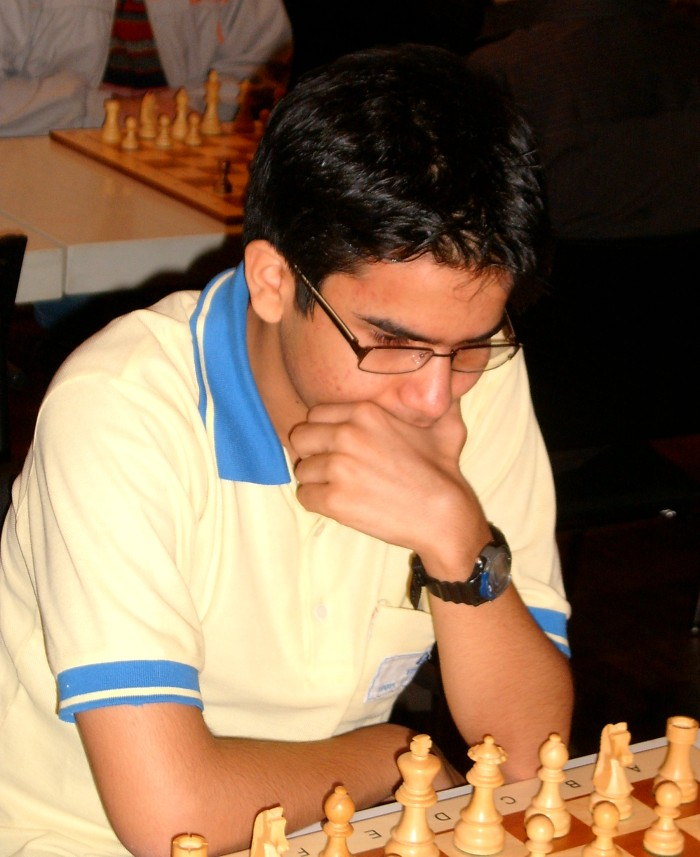

Personal information
- Born: 9 February 1993 (age 33) New Delhi, India

Chess career
- Country: India
- Title: Grandmaster (2006)
- FIDE rating: 2612 (November 2026)
- Peak rating: 2671 (October 2013)
- Peak ranking: No. 73 (June 2015)

Parimarjan Negi (born 9 February 1993) is an Indian chess grandmaster. He achieved the grandmaster title at the age of 13 years, 4 months, and 20 days, which made him the second youngest grandmaster in history at the time. As of June 2025, he is the ninth youngest player to achieve this feat.

Negi is an Indian and Asian champion. He played on the top board for the bronze medal-winning Indian team in the 2014 Chess Olympiad in Tromsø, Norway.

He was granted the Arjuna Award in 2010 by the Government of India.

== Chess career ==
Parimarjan Negi won the under 10 division at the Asian Youth Chess Championship in 2002 in Tehran. He achieved his first grandmaster norm at the 2005/06 Hastings International Chess Congress. Soon after he earned his second GM norm at the 4th Parsvnath International Open Chess Tournament in Delhi. Negi earned his third and final GM norm on 1 July 2006 by drawing with Russian Grandmaster Ruslan Shcherbakov at the Chelyabinsk Region Superfinal Championship in Satka, Russia, where he finished with six points from nine rounds. Negi thus became the youngest chess grandmaster ever in India, breaking Pentala Harikrishna's record, and the second youngest ever in the world.

Negi won the strong Philadelphia International Open Tournament in June 2008 with a score of 7/9, and was undefeated. In August 2008, he finished second, behind Abhijeet Gupta, at the World Junior Chess Championship in Gaziantep. In 2009 he won the Politiken Cup in Copenhagen with 8.5/10, on tiebreaks over Boris Avrukh, and the 6th IGB Dato' Arthur Tan Malaysia Open in Kuala Lumpur.

Parimarjan Negi won the 48th National Premier Chess Championship on 22 December 2010 in New Delhi.

In 2012 Negi won the 11th Asian Chess Championship held in Ho Chi Minh City. He tied for first place in the Cappelle-la-Grande Open in 2012 and 2013. In 2013, he also won the Politiken Cup for the second time.

By 2017 he had retired from chess.

== Books ==
- Parimarjan Negi (2014). 1.e4 vs The French, Caro-Kann and Philidor. Quality Chess. ISBN 978-1906552060.
- Parimarjan Negi (2015). 1.e4 vs The Sicilian I. Quality Chess. ISBN 978-1-906552-39-8.
- Parimarjan Negi (2015). 1.e4 vs The Sicilian II. Quality Chess. ISBN 978-1-907982-57-6.
- Parimarjan Negi (2016). 1.e4 vs The Sicilian III. Quality Chess. ISBN 978-1-78483-023-6.

== Personal life ==
Parimarjan Negi attended school at Amity International School in New Delhi. He then graduated from Stanford University as a Mathematics major in 2018. As of July 2021, he is a PhD student at the Computer Science and Artificial Intelligence Laboratory at the Massachusetts Institute of Technology (MIT).
