= Vladimir Burmakin =

Russian chess grandmaster (born 1967)

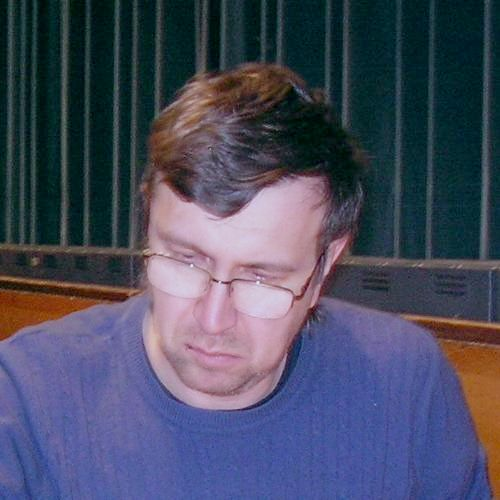
- Burmakin in 2010

Personal information
- Born: 6 June 1967 (age 59) Murmansk, Soviet Union

Chess career
- Country: Soviet Union → Russia
- Title: Grandmaster (1994)
- Peak rating: 2627 (July 2009)

Vladimir Anatolyevich Burmakin (born 6 June 1967) is a Russian chess player. He was awarded the title of Grandmaster by FIDE in 1994.

== Chess career ==
In 1994 he tied for 3rd-5th places in the Russian championship at Elista, with Sergei Rublevsky and Vasily Yemelin (Peter Svidler won, Mikhail Ulibin was second).

Burmakin won or shared first place in several tournaments:

- 1993 – Szeged – Balatonberény – Werfen (repeated in 1996)
- 1994 – Moscow – Graz (repeated in 1997 and 2001)
- 1995 – Chigorin Memorial in Saint Petersburg
- 1997 – Cappelle-la-Grande open (repeated in 2003)
- 1999 – Pula
- 2000 – Seefeld
- 2002 – Geneva – Pardubice – Zurich
- 2003 – Porto San Giorgio (repeated in 2006)
- 2004 – Schwäbisch Gmünd (repeated in 2005, 2006, and 2007) – Bad Wörishofen (repeated in 2006 and 2008) – Benasque
- 2005 – Schwarzach – Dordrecht, "Daniël Noteboom Memorial"
- 2006 – Le Touquet – Béthune (repeated in 2007) – Dos Hermanas
- 2007 – Bratto (repeated in 2008) – Albacete – Salou – Sitges
- 2008 – Benidorm – "BDO Premier" in Haarlem

Burmakin played for Russia in the European Senior Team Chess Championship 2019 in the 50+ division. His team won the gold medal.

Burmakin is an expert of the Caro-Kann defence, playing it almost invariably in his games against 1. e4; against 1. d4 he usually adopts the Chebanenko Variation of the Slav defence.
