= Vugar Gashimov =

Azerbaijani chess grandmaster (1986–2014)

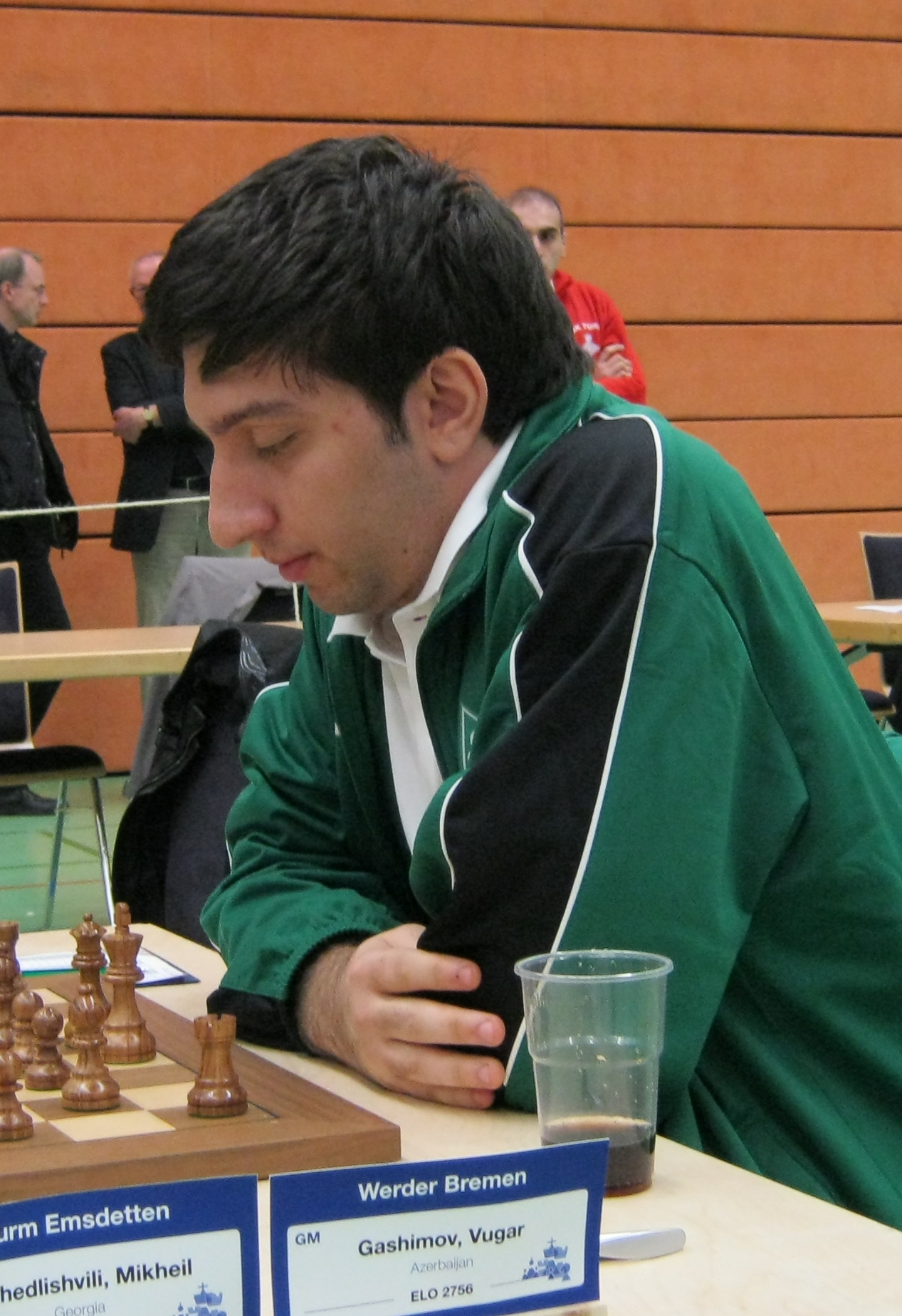
- Gashimov in 2011

Personal information
- Born: Vüqar Qasım oğlu Həşimov; 24 July 1986 Baku, Azerbaijan SSR, Soviet Union
- Died: 11 January 2014 (aged 27) Heidelberg, Germany

Chess career
- Country: Azerbaijan
- Title: Grandmaster (2002)
- Peak rating: 2761 (January 2012)
- Peak ranking: No. 6 (November 2009)

Vugar Gasim oghlu Hashimov (Azerbaijani: Vüqar Qasım oğlu Həşimov; 24 July 1986 – 11 January 2014), known internationally as Vugar Gashimov, (Note: Based on the translation of his name into Russian: Вугар Гасым оглы Гашимов, romanized: Vugar Gasym ogly Gashimov) was an Azerbaijani chess grandmaster. He was a noted player of blitz chess. At his peak ranking, he was No. 6 in the world, achieved in November 2009.

He won the Athens 2005 (Acropolis International), and tied for first at the Cappelle-la-Grande open in 2007, he again tied for first and was winning it on tie-break in 2008. He won the strong and traditional invitation tournament at Reggio Emilia in 2010–11 on tie-break above Francisco Vallejo Pons.

== Early life ==
Gashimov was born on 24 July 1986 in Baku. He was the son of a retired army colonel who served at the Defense Ministry of Azerbaijan.

== Chess career ==
In 2010, Gashimov won the Reggio Emilia chess tournament.

=== Team competitions ===
Gashimov played for Azerbaijan in the Chess Olympiads of 2002, 2004, 2006 and 2008. He played in the gold medal-winning Azerbaijani team at the European Team Chess Championship in Novi Sad in 2009, alongside Shakhriyar Mamedyarov, Teimour Radjabov, Rauf Mammadov and Gadir Guseinov, previously winning bronze medal in 2007. In 2010, however, he did not represent his country at the Chess Olympiad in Khanty-Mansiysk due to a conflict with the national chess federation and former team coach Zurab Azmaiparashvili.

=== Playing style ===
Gashimov was known as a particularly strong blitz chess player.

At the peak of his playing career, he revived the fortunes of the Modern Benoni, an opening that had become unpopular at the top level of chess, and used it to get good results against strong grandmasters, including even the leading players of the time, such as Alexander Grischuk (see § Notable games).

== Personal life ==
Gashimov enjoyed football, table tennis and pool. He was also a fan of Jackie Chan movies. He was managed by his older brother Sarkhan, an IT manager who is also a master-level chess player.

== Death and aftermath ==
=== Death ===
Doctors diagnosed Gashimov with epilepsy when he fell ill in February 2000, and shortly afterwards, discovered a brain tumor. While receiving treatment for the brain tumor in a hospital in Heidelberg, Germany, Gashimov died in the early hours of 11 January 2014. He had been inactive from chess since playing in the Tata Steel Chess Tournament in January 2012. He was buried at the Alley of Honor in Baku.

=== Reaction ===
Chess grandmasters and sports professionals around the world reacted to Gashimov's death. Teimour Radjabov, one of Gashimov's closest teammates, said that he could not find "words to explain the deepest sorrow".

Nigel Short described Gashimov as "a brilliant player and great guy." Former world champion Garry Kasparov said he was "deeply saddened", and found it "remarkable considering the medical obstacles he faced" that he made it to the top ten in the FIDE rating list. Magnus Carlsen described Gashimov as "one of the most talented and original players I've met. He was always friendly with everyone and always smiling. I have many good memories with him from tournaments, especially in the Amber tournaments."

Tributes also came from famous chess players such as Shakhriyar Mamedyarov, Hikaru Nakamura, Levon Aronian, Alexandra Kosteniuk, Judit Polgár, Sergey Karjakin and many others. One minute of silence was held at the 76th Tata Steel Chess Tournament and during all tournaments held in Baku in January 2014.

Azerbaijani President Ilham Aliyev said, "Vugar Gashimov's services to the Azerbaijani sports are unmatched. Vugar Gashimov made an incomparable contribution to development of Azerbaijan's chess school, and glorified the country with his brilliant victories."

== Legacy ==
The first Gashimov Memorial took place in Şəmkir in April 2014, with participants Magnus Carlsen, Fabiano Caruana, Shakhriyar Mamedyarov, Teimour Radjabov, Sergey Karjakin, Hikaru Nakamura, Étienne Bacrot, Wang Hao, Rauf Mamedov, Qadir Huseynov, Pavel Eljanov, Radosław Wojtaszek, Alexander Motylev, Eltaj Safarli, Nijat Abasov, and Vasif Durarbayli.

On 24 July 2014, a monument was unveiled on his grave in Baku.

== Notable tournament victories ==
- Reggio Emilia chess tournament 2010, 1st
- Cappelle la Grande, tied for 1st in 2007 and 2008 (winning as first on tie-break)

== Notable games ==
- Vugar Gashimov vs Gata Kamsky, Baku Grand Prix 2008, Spanish Game: Closed Variations (ECO C84), 1–0
- Vugar Gashimov vs Andrei Volokitin, Poikovsky Tournament 2008, Sicilian Defense: Najdorf Variation (ECO B96), 1–0
- Vugar Gashimov vs Alexander Grischuk, Elista Grand Prix 2008, Sicilian Defense: Najdorf, Poisoned Pawn Variation (ECO B97), 1–0
- Vugar Gashimov vs Alexander Beliavsky, Gibtelecom 2009, Spanish Game: Closed Variations (ECO C84), 1–0
- Alexander Grischuk vs Vugar Gashimov, Amber Tournament (Rapid) 2010, Modern Benoni: Fianchetto Variation (ECO A62), 0–1
