= Erwin l'Ami =

Dutch chess grandmaster (born 1985)

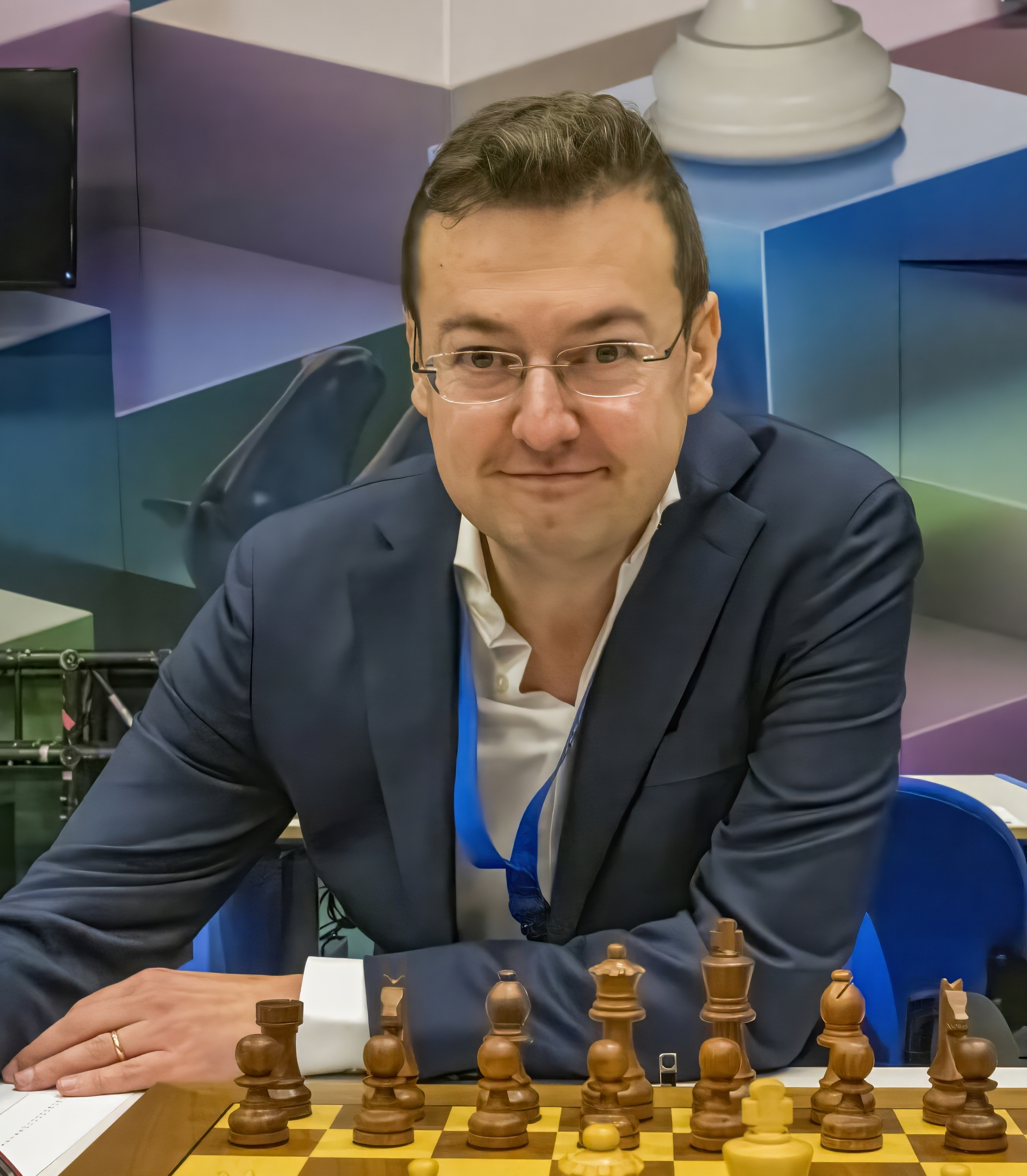
- l'Ami in 2024

Personal information
- Born: 5 April 1985 (age 41) Woerden, Netherlands
- Spouse: Alina Moţoc

Chess career
- Country: Netherlands
- Title: Grandmaster (2005)
- FIDE rating: 2592 (July 2026)
- Peak rating: 2651 (May 2014)
- Peak ranking: No. 88 (February 2026)

Erwin l'Ami (born 5 April 1985) is a Dutch chess grandmaster. He attained the title of grandmaster in 2005, and has reached a peak rating of 2651. l'Ami has represented the Netherlands at seven Chess Olympiads (2006, 2008, 2010, 2014, 2016, 2018, 2022) and won the 2015 Reykjavik Open.

== Early years ==
l'Ami learned to play chess at the age of five, when his father introduced him to the moves and then took him to the local chess club.

== Chess career ==
At Gausdal in 2004, he won the tournament, ahead of Magnus Carlsen and despite being expected to finish no higher than mid-table. He soon fulfilled the requirements for an International Master (IM) title, awarded the same year. Becoming a full-time professional, the opportunities for travel continued to suit his lifestyle and in 2005, he complemented his training and dedication with a few good wins, gaining the necessary norms to be awarded the Grandmaster title. During this period, he finished second equal at the Essent tournament, was co-winner of the strong Karabakh 'B' tournament and scored well at the Wijk aan Zee Corus 'C' tourney, earning an upgrade to the 'B' tournament in 2006.

At the Turin 2006 Olympiad, he played a small but helpful role in the national team with a very respectable score of 3.5/5. By then, his Elo rating was reflecting the consistency in his performances and he passed the 2600 mark by the early part of 2007. Working with a new coach (GM Vladimir Chuchelov) was perhaps another reason for his continued progress. At the European Team Chess Championship at Heraklion in 2007, he contributed another plus score (4.5/8) to the Netherlands team total.

2008 was a rewarding year for l'Ami. He finished with a share of second place at the European Individual Championship in Plovdiv, missing out on the medals after an eight-way play-off. More recently, he took part in the EU Individual Open Chess Championship at Liverpool, maintaining touch with the leading group throughout and finishing with a share of fifth place, alongside compatriots Sergei Tiviakov and Jan Smeets.

He took part in the Chess World Cup 2009 and was knocked out by Krishnan Sasikiran in the first round.

In 2010, L'Ami helped Veselin Topalov in his World Championship match against Viswanathan Anand.

In 2014, L'Ami participated in a chess.com death match against Jan Smeets, which he won.

In 2015, he won the Reykjavik Open scoring 8.5/10.

In 2022 he won the Dutch Chess Championship.

== Chess second ==
In 2008 l'Ami began working as a second to Ivan Cheparinov after the two had met at a tournament and became friends. Principally, he was engaged to assist Cheparinov at the elite Sofia M-Tel Masters event and benefited not only from the theoretical work they undertook together, but also from the insight he gained into chess at that level. In an interview given after the event, he considered the experience to be "inspirational". Along with Cheparinov and Francisco Vallejo Pons, he served as a second for Veselin Topalov in the February 2009 Challengers Match against Gata Kamsky. He has since served as second of Anish Giri.

== Personal life ==
He is married to Romanian IM and Woman Grandmaster (WGM) Alina l'Ami.
