= Tornike Sanikidze =

Georgian chess grandmaster (born 1989)

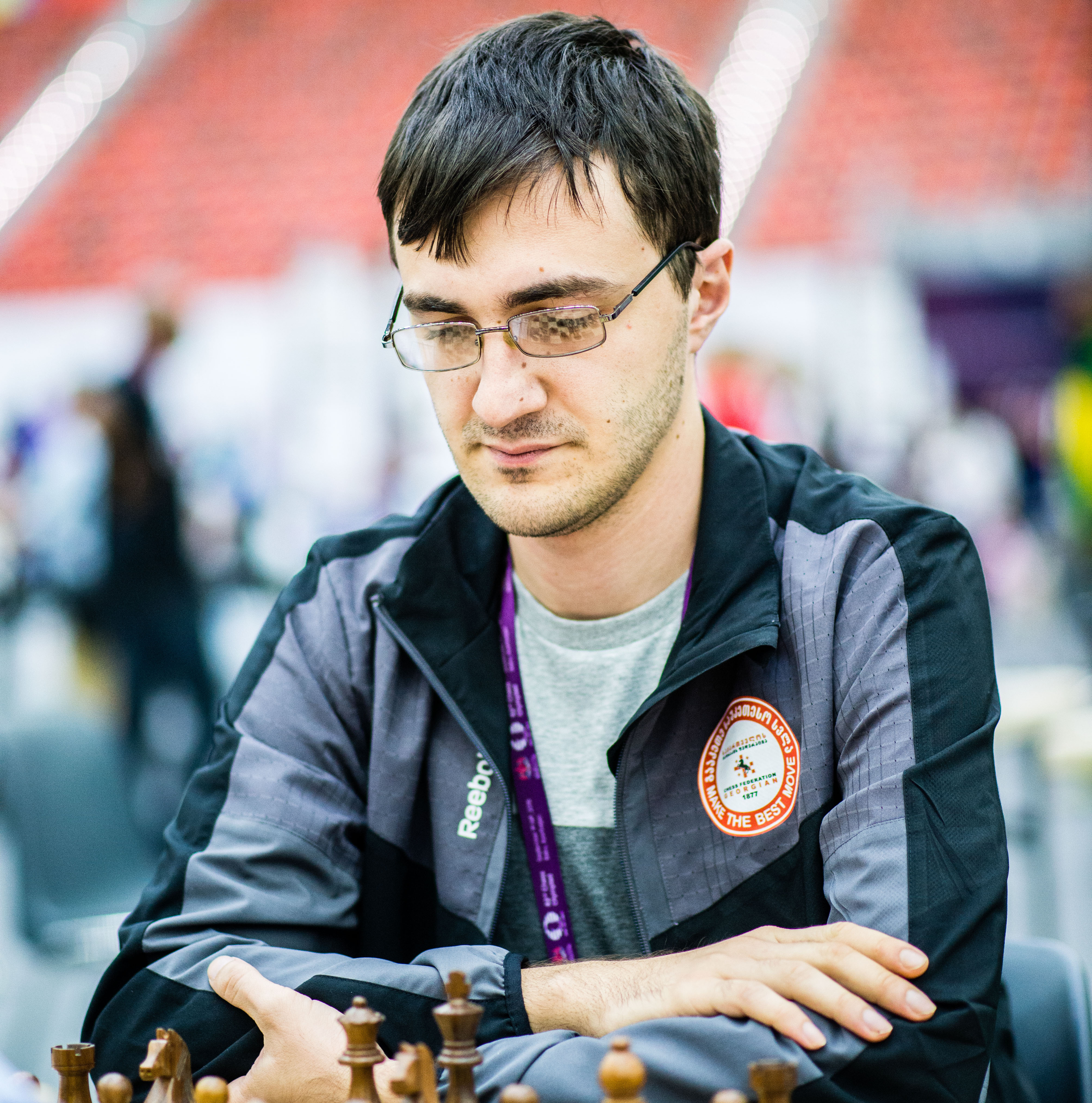

Personal information
- Born: January 1, 1989 (age 37)

Chess career
- Country: Georgia
- Title: Grandmaster (2008)
- FIDE rating: 2432 (July 2026)
- Peak rating: 2616 (May 2012)

Tornike Sanikidze (born 1989) is a Georgian chess grandmaster. He was awarded the titles of International Master in 2005 and Grandmaster in 2008. He won the Georgian championship in 2009.

He has represented Georgia at the Chess Olympiad, including:

- 2012, where he scored 4/7 on board three.
- 2016, scoring 3½/6 on first reserve.
