= List of world records in chess =

The world records in chess listed here are achieved in organized tournament, match, or simultaneous exhibition play.

== Game length records ==
=== Longest game ===
The longest decisive FIDE-rated game is Billy Fellowes vs Peter Lalić, London 2024, which lasted for 272 moves, at the Third Kingston Invitational.

The longest game played in a world championship is the 6th game of the 2021 World Chess Championship between Magnus Carlsen and Ian Nepomniachtchi, which Carlsen won in 136 moves by resignation. The game lasted nearly 8 hours.

=== Shortest game ===
==== Shortest decisive game ====
The fewest moves required to deliver checkmate in chess is two, in what is known as the fool's mate (1.g4 e5 2.f3?? Qh4# and variants thereof).

In a tournament game at odds of pawn and move, White delivered checkmate on move 2: W. Cooke–"R____g", Cape Town Chess Club handicap tournament 1908 (remove Black's f-pawn) 1.e4 g5?? 2.Qh5#. The same game had previously been played in Leeky–Mason, Dublin 1867.

If one counts forfeited games as a loss in zero moves, then there have been many such forfeits, with some notable examples being Game 2 of the 1972 world championship match between Boris Spassky and Bobby Fischer, which Fischer defaulted, and Game 5 of the 2006 world championship match between Vladimir Kramnik and Veselin Topalov, which Kramnik defaulted.

Under FIDE rules instituted around 2008, a player who is late for the beginning of a round loses the game, as does a player who has a forbidden electronic device (by default any device). The former rule was used at the 2009 Chinese Championship to forfeit Hou Yifan for arriving five seconds late for the beginning of a round. The latter rule was used to forfeit Aleksander Delchev against Stuart Conquest after the move 1.d4 in the 2009 European Team Championship.

Position: a8 black rook, c8 black bishop, f8 black rook, g8 black king, h8 white bishop, b7 black pawn, c7 black pawn, e7 black pawn, f7 black pawn, g7 black bishop, h7 black pawn, c6 black knight, g6 black pawn, a4 white pawn, b4 black pawn, c4 white pawn, g4 black knight, h4 white pawn, d2 white king, e2 white pawn, f2 white pawn, b1 white knight, f1 white bishop, g1 white knight, h1 white rook

Hübner–Rogoff 1972, situation after 12...axb4; draw agreed

The German grandmaster Robert Hübner also lost a game without playing any moves. In a World Student Team Championship game played in Graz in 1972, Hübner played one move and offered a draw to Kenneth Rogoff, who accepted. However, the arbiters insisted that some moves be played, so the players played the following ridiculous game: 1.c4 Nf6 2.Nf3 g6 3.Ng1 Bg7 4.Qa4 0-0 5.Qxd7 Qxd7 6.g4 Qxd2+ 7.Kxd2 Nxg4 8.b4 a5 9.a4 Bxa1 10.Bb2 Nc6 11.Bh8 Bg7 12.h4 axb4 (draw agreed). The arbiters ruled that both players must apologize and play an actual game at 7 p.m. Rogoff appeared and apologized; Hübner did neither. Hübner's clock was started, and after an hour Rogoff was declared the winner. Wang Chen and Lu Shanglei both lost a game in which they had played no moves. They agreed to a draw without play at the 2009 Zhejiang Lishui Xingqiu Cup International Open Chess Tournament held in Lishui, Zhejiang Province, China. The chief arbiter declared both players to have lost the game.

More rarely, a player might decide to protest by resigning a game rather than forfeiting. A game between Fischer and Oscar Panno, played at the Palma de Mallorca Interzonal 1970, went: 1.c4 Black resigns. Panno refused to play to protest the organizers' rescheduling of the game to accommodate Fischer's desire not to play on his religion's Sabbath. Panno was not present when the game was to begin. Fischer waited ten minutes before making his move and went to get Panno to convince him to play. Fifty-two minutes had elapsed on Panno's clock before he came to the board and resigned. (At the time, an absence of sixty minutes resulted in a forfeit.)

The shortest decisive tournament game between masters that was decided because of the position on the board (i.e. not because of a forfeit or protest) is Z. Đorđević–M. Kovačević, Bela Crkva 1984. It lasted only three moves (1.d4 Nf6 2.Bg5 c6 3.e3?? Qa5+ winning the bishop), and White resigned. This was repeated in Vassallo–Gamundi, Salamanca 1998. (In a number of other games, White has played on after 3...Qa5+, occasionally drawing or even winning in this line.)

The shortest game ever lost by a grandmaster because of the position on the board was by GM Yair Kraidman, who lost in four moves against IM Hagen Poetsch at the 2013 Vienna Open (1.e4 c5 2.Nf3 g6 3.d4 cxd4 4.Qxd4 Nc6?? apparently thinking that White captured with the Knight instead of the Queen). Future world champion Viswanathan Anand resigned on move 6 against Alonso Zapata in 1988 after 1.e4 e5 2.Nf3 Nf6 3.Nxe5 d6 4.Nf3 Nxe4 5.Nc3 Bf5?? 6.Qe2 winning a piece, since 6...Qe7 is answered by 7.Nd5 Qe6? 8.Nxc7+.

==== Shortest draw ====
A game may be drawn by mutual agreement in any number of moves. Traditionally, it has been common for players to agree to a "grandmaster draw" after playing about 10–15 moves of known opening theory and making no serious effort to win. This is usually done to preserve energy in a tournament, after a devastating loss in the previous round of the tournament, or in the final round when no prize money is at stake. There has been some debate over the ethics of the practice, and recently there has been a trend away from such games, with many tournaments adopting measures to discourage short draws. If the tournament officials (unlike those at Graz and Lishui) do not object, a game may even be agreed drawn without a single move being played. Tony Miles and Stewart Reuben did the same thing in the last round of the Luton 1975 tournament, "with the blessing of the controller", in order to assure themselves of first and second places respectively.

==== Shortest stalemate ====
Position: f8 black bishop, g8 black knight, h8 black rook, e7 black pawn, g7 black pawn, h7 black queen, e6 white queen, f6 black pawn, g6 black king, h6 black rook, h5 black pawn, h4 white pawn, e3 white pawn, a2 white pawn, b2 white pawn, c2 white pawn, d2 white pawn, f2 white pawn, g2 white pawn, a1 white rook, b1 white knight, c1 white bishop, e1 white king, f1 white bishop, g1 white knight, h1 white rook

Shortest possible stalemate after 10.Qe6

The shortest known stalemate, composed by Sam Loyd, involves the sequence 1.e3 a5 2.Qh5 Ra6 3.Qxa5 h5 4.Qxc7 Rah6 5.h4 f6 6.Qxd7+ Kf7 7.Qxb7 Qd3 8.Qxb8 Qh7 9.Qxc8 Kg6 10.Qe6 (diagram). The shortest stalemate with all of the pieces on the board, composed by Charles H Wheeler, occurs after 1.d4 d6 2.Qd2 e5 3.a4 e4 4.Qf4 f5 5.h3 Be7 6.Qh2 Be6 7.Ra3 c5 8.Rg3 Qa5+ 9.Nd2 Bh4 10.f3 Bb3 11.d5 e3 12.c4 f4 (minor variations are possible). The shortest known route to a position where both players are stalemated, discovered by Enzo Minerva and published in the Italian newspaper l'Unità on August 14, 2007, is 1.c4 d5 2.Qb3 Bh3 3.gxh3 f5 4.Qxb7 Kf7 5.Qxa7 Kg6 6.f3 c5 7.Qxe7 Rxa2 8.Kf2 Rxb2 9.Qxg7+ Kh5 10.Qxg8 Rxb1 11.Rxb1 Kh4 12.Qxh8 h5 13.Qh6 Bxh6 14.Rxb8 Be3+ 15.dxe3 Qxb8 16.Kg2 Qf4 17.exf4 d4 18.Be3 dxe3.

=== Fewest moves played in a tournament ===
In the Premier I group at the 2003 Capablanca Memorial tournament, Péter Székely took just 130 moves (an average of 10 moves per game) to draw all 13 of his games.

== Game play records ==
=== Latest first capture ===
In Rogoff–Williams, World Junior Chess Championship, Stockholm 1969, the first capture (94.bxc5) occurred on White's 94th move. Filipowicz–Smederevac, Polanica-Zdrój 1966, was drawn in 70 moves under the fifty-move rule, without any piece or pawn having been captured.

==== Latest first capture in a decisive game ====
Position: e8 black knight, f8 black bishop, g8 black rook, h8 black knight, d7 black bishop, e7 black queen, f7 black rook, h7 black king, d6 black pawn, f6 black pawn, g6 black pawn, h6 black pawn, c5 black pawn, d5 white pawn, e5 black pawn, g5 white pawn, a4 black pawn, b4 black pawn, c4 white pawn, e4 white pawn, f4 white pawn, h4 white pawn, d3 white bishop, f3 white queen, g3 white knight, h3 white knight, a2 white pawn, b2 white pawn, h2 white rook, c1 white bishop, g1 white rook, h1 white king

Yates–Znosko-Borovsky, 1927, after White's 40th move

In the decisive game Yates–Znosko-Borovsky, Tunbridge Wells 1927, the first capture occurred on Black's 40th move.

1.e4 e5 2.Nf3 Nc6 3.Bb5 a6 4.Ba4 Nf6 5.0-0 Be7 6.Re1 b5 7.Bb3 d6 8.c3 Na5 9.Bc2 c5 10.d4 Qc7 11.h3 0-0 12.Nbd2 Bd7 13.Nf1 Nc6 14.d5 Nd8 15.g4 Ne8 16.Ng3 g6 17.Kh2 Ng7 18.Rg1 f6 19.Be3 Nf7 20.Rg2 Kh8 21.Qd2 Qc8 22.Rh1 Rg8 23.Rhg1 a5 24.Kh1 b4 25.c4 a4 26.Bd3 Qa6 27.Qe2 Raf8 28.Nd2 Qc8 29.f3 Ne8 30.Ndf1 Kg7 31.Bc1 h6 32.Ne3 Kh7 33.Rh2 Nh8 34.h4 Rf7 35.Nd1 Bf8 36.Nf2 Bg7 37.f4 Bf8 38.Qf3 Qd8 39.Nh3 Qe7 40.g5 (diagram) Bxh3 41.f5 hxg5 42.hxg5 Rgg7 43.Rxh3+ Kg8 44.fxg6 Rxg6 45.Nf5 Qd7 46.Rg2 fxg5 47.Rgh2 Bg7 48.Rxh8+ Bxh8 49.Qh5 Rff6 50.Qxh8+ Kf7 51.Rh7+ Ng7 52.Rxg7+ Rxg7 53.Qxg7+ 1–0

=== Latest castling ===
The latest castling occurred on Black's 48th move in Neshewat-Garrison, Michigan 1994 and Somogyi-Black, New York 2002.

=== Theoretical novelties ===
The book 1000 TN!! The Best Theoretical Novelties contains the games with the ten highest-ranked theoretical novelties (TNs) that appeared in each of Volumes 11 through 110 of Chess Informant. The earliest such novelty occurred on White's fourth move in Karpov–Miles, Bugojno 1978, namely 1.c4 b6 2.d4 e6 3.d5 Qh4 4.Nc3! The latest occurred on Black's 34th move (34...Kd5!) in Shulman–Marin, Reykjavík Open 2009. The only game to receive a perfect rating from Chess Informant's panel of judges was Miles–Beliavsky, Tilburg 1986, which featured the novelty 18.f4!! It received 90 points, 10 out of a possible 10 from each of the 9 judges.

=== Longest consideration for a move ===
Position: a8 black rook, c8 black bishop, d8 black queen, e8 black king, h8 black rook, a7 black pawn, b7 black pawn, c7 black pawn, d7 black pawn, f7 black pawn, g7 black pawn, h7 black pawn, f6 black knight, e5 black knight, c4 white pawn, d4 white pawn, e4 white pawn, c3 white knight, a2 white pawn, b2 white pawn, f2 white king, g2 white pawn, h2 white pawn, a1 white rook, c1 white bishop, d1 white queen, f1 white bishop, h1 white rook

Trois thought for 2 hours 20 minutes deciding between 7...Neg4+ and 7...Ng6.

Before the introduction of chess clocks, it was common for players to take more than an hour to decide on a move. Among the players who had a reputation for playing particularly slowly (taking over 2 hours for a move) are Alexander McDonnell and Elijah Williams, however, it was not normal practice to time a player's moves so claims about the slowness of a player in an untimed game must be considered unverified.

In Vigo, Spain in 1980, the Brazilian International Master Francisco Trois spent 2 hours and 20 minutes over his 7th move, deciding which of two viable moves to make. After blitzing out another 21 moves in serious time trouble, he resigned. His opponent, Luis Santos, asked him after the game, "How can you think for over two hours when there are only two possible moves? I don't understand." Trois replied, "Neither do I."

== National records ==
=== Most grandmasters ===
Following the breakup of the Soviet Union, Russia holds the record for greatest number of grandmasters. In the November 2018 rating list, 229 of the 1645 grandmasters were from Russia.

=== Greatest concentration of resident grandmasters ===
In 2005, Reykjavík, Iceland, with eight grandmasters (Jón L. Árnason, Jóhann Hjartarson, Margeir Pétursson, Friðrik Ólafsson, Thröstur Thórhallsson, Helgi Grétarsson, Hannes Stefánsson, and Bobby Fischer) had a higher percentage of resident grandmasters per capita than any other city worldwide; the city of 114,000 had, therefore, one grandmaster per 14,000 residents.

=== Strongest team ===
The USSR team that participated in the 13th Olympiad (Munich 1958) had been claimed as the strongest team ever. It was composed of four world champions (Mikhail Botvinnik, Vasily Smyslov, Mikhail Tal and Tigran Petrosian), one world championship challenger (David Bronstein) and Paul Keres, four times runner-up in the Candidates Tournament.

== Tournament records ==
=== Perfect tournament scores ===
In top-class chess it is rare for a player to complete a tournament or match with a 100 percent score. Some examples are:

- Gustav Neumann at Berlin 1865 (34/34)
- William Pollock at Belfast 1886 (8/8)
- Emanuel Lasker at New York 1893 (13/13)
- Henry Atkins at Amsterdam 1899 (15/15)
- José Raúl Capablanca at New York 1913 (13/13, including one default)
- Dawid Janowski at Paris 1914 (9/9)
- Alexander Alekhine at Moscow 1919–20 (11/11)
- Boris Kostić at Hastings 1921–22 (7/7)
- William Lombardy is the only player ever to achieve a perfect score in the World Junior Chess Championship, open to players under the age of 20 as of January 1 in the year of competition. He scored 11–0 at Toronto 1957.
- Bobby Fischer in New York at the US Championship of 1963/64 (11/11)
- Alexander Beliavsky at Alicante 1978 (13/13)
- Wesley So scored 9/9 in the 2011 Inter-Provincial Chess Team Championship, with a performance rating of 3037.
- Sandro Mareco at Montevideo 2017 (9/9)
- Karen H. Grigoryan at Famalicão 2019 (9/9)

Vera Menchik won four consecutive Women's World Chess Championship tournaments with perfect scores, a total of 45 games (8–0 at Prague 1931, 14–0 at Folkestone 1933, 9–0 at Warsaw 1935, and 14–0 at Stockholm 1937).

A number of players have made perfect scores at Chess Olympiads: Alekhine scored 9–0 on first board for France at the 3rd Chess Olympiad (Hamburg, 1930), and Dragoljub Čirić scored 8–0 as second reserve (the sixth player on his team) for Yugoslavia at the 17th Olympiad (Havana, 1966), but each played only about half of the possible games. Robert Gwaze scored 9–0 on first board for Zimbabwe at the 35th Olympiad (Bled, 2002).

=== Most tournament victories ===
As of December 2011, John Curdo had won 865 tournaments. When he died in 2022, he was credited with winning 1,009 tournaments.

=== Most wins in a national championship ===
As of 2017, Carlos Juárez has won the Guatemalan Chess Championship 27 times.

=== Most games won ===
Gustav Neumann won 34 of his games, also a perfect score, at the aforementioned Berlin 1865 tournament.

=== Most games lost ===
Nicholas MacLeod holds the record for the most games lost in a single tournament: he lost 31 games at the Sixth American Chess Congress at New York 1889, while winning six and drawing one. MacLeod was only 19, and the tournament, a 20-player double-round robin, was one of the longest tournaments in chess history. The most games lost by a player who lost all of his games in a tournament was by Colonel Moreau. At Monte Carlo 1903, Moreau lost all 26 of his games.

=== Lost all games on time ===
At the Büsum 1969 tournament, Friedrich Sämisch lost all 15 games by exceeding the time control. He lost all 13 of his games at the Linköping 1969 tournament the same way.

=== Most world champions in a tournament ===
Nottingham 1936 included five past, current, and future world champions: reigning champion Max Euwe; Alexander Alekhine, who had lost the title to Euwe the prior year, and would regain it the following year; former champions Emanuel Lasker and José Raúl Capablanca; and Mikhail Botvinnik, who would win the championship in 1948. This record was equaled by Moscow 1971 and the 1973 Soviet Chess Championship, each of which included former champions Vasily Smyslov, Mikhail Tal, and Tigran Petrosian; Boris Spassky, who was champion from 1969 to 1972; and future champion Anatoly Karpov.

=== Largest tie for first ===
Thirteen players tied for first with 5–1 scores at the National Open held on March 17–19, 2000 in Las Vegas: grandmasters Jaan Ehlvest, Alexander Goldin, Alexander Baburin, Pavel Blatny, Eduard Gufeld, Yuri Shulman, Alex Yermolinsky, Gregory Kaidanov, Dmitry Gurevich, Alexander Stripunsky, and Gregory Serper, and International Masters Rade Milovanovic and Levon Altounian.

=== Highest performance rating in a classical tournament ===
The highest performance rating in history is 3103, achieved by Karen H. Grigoryan when he scored a perfect 9/9 at the 2019 Cidade de Famalicão tournament. At top level, Fabiano Caruana achieved a 3098 performance rating at the 2014 Sinquefield Cup.

== Match records ==
=== Perfect scores ===
Perfect scores were achieved in matches by:

- Howard Staunton over Daniel Harrwitz in 1846 (7/7)
- Wilhelm Steinitz over Joseph Henry Blackburne in 1876 (7/7)
- Capablanca over Kostić in 1919 (5/5)
- Fischer over Mark Taimanov in 1971 (6/6) (quarter-final Candidates Match)
- Fischer over Bent Larsen in 1971 (6/6) (semi-final Candidates Match)

=== Highest percentage of draws in matches ===
At the World Chess Championship 2018 between Magnus Carlsen and Fabiano Caruana, all 12 classical games ended in draws (100%). Only in the tiebreaks, there were three decisive rapid games.

== Playing records ==
=== Consecutive wins against masters ===
Bobby Fischer won 20 consecutive games, all in competitions at late stages of the world championship cycle. (Some commentators give this as 19, discounting Fischer's game against Oscar Panno, who resigned after Fischer's first move as a protest.) Fischer won his last seven games at the 1970 Palma de Mallorca Interzonal (including the one-move game against Panno), then swept Mark Taimanov 6–0 in the quarterfinals followed by Bent Larsen by the same score in the semifinals. In the Candidates Match final, Fischer beat former World Champion Tigran Petrosian in the first game before Petrosian snapped the streak by winning the second match game.

Wilhelm Steinitz won his last 16 games at Vienna 1873, including a two-game playoff against Joseph Henry Blackburne at the end. He played no more serious chess until an 1876 match against Blackburne that Steinitz swept 7–0. After a long period of inactivity, Steinitz played at Vienna 1882, where he won his first two games before finally ending his winning streak with a draw. Steinitz's 25-game winning streak over nine years has never been equaled.

Vera Menchik won 59 consecutive games at the Women's World Championships tournaments over nine years, However she lost many games to the top male players during the streak, as well as a few games in matches against Sonja Graf.

=== Longest unbeaten streak ===
The longest confirmed unbeaten streak at an elite level belongs to Magnus Carlsen, who achieved an unbeaten streak of 125 games in the classical time format. His streak started after a loss on July 31, 2018, in the Biel tournament against Shakhriyar Mamedyarov, and ended on October 10, 2020, when he lost to Jan-Krzysztof Duda in a game at the Altibox Norway Chess Tournament. The streak consists of 42 wins and 83 draws. It includes three wins in the Norwegian Chess League against opponents rated more than 500 Elo points lower, which Carlsen prefers not to count. Carlsen's streak broke the previous record of 100 games by Ding Liren, who went unbeaten from August 2017 to November 2018. Ding in turn had taken the record from Mikhail Tal, who managed 95 games unbeaten in 1973–74.

Bogdan Lalić's unbeaten streak of 155 games (against less elite players than those Carlsen faced) is confirmed to have taken place between 2010 and 2011, according to the FIDE ratings website.

In correspondence chess, Denny Marbourg achieved an unbeaten streak of 169 games, according to the ICCF U.S.A. website.

=== Most world champions defeated ===
In 2012, Garry Kasparov posed the question of who had defeated the most world champions. The question as posed only includes undisputed world champions, includes games against players who were not yet or were no longer world champion at the time of the game, but only includes games at classical time controls.

At the time of the puzzle, the answer was Paul Keres, who had defeated 9. When Magnus Carlsen became world champion in 2013, Viktor Korchnoi and Alexander Beliavsky joined him, also with 9:

- Keres defeated every world champion from Capablanca (3rd) to Fischer (11th): José Raúl Capablanca, Alexander Alekhine, Max Euwe, Mikhail Botvinnik, Vasily Smyslov, Mikhail Tal, Tigran Petrosian, Boris Spassky, Bobby Fischer.
- Korchnoi defeated every world champion from Botvinnik (6th) to Kasparov (13th), and also Carlsen (16th): Botvinnik, Smyslov, Tal, Petrosian, Spassky, Fischer, Anatoly Karpov, Garry Kasparov, Carlsen.
- Beliavsky has defeated every world champion from Smyslov (7th) to Carlsen (16th), except for Fischer: Smyslov, Tal, Petrosian, Spassky, Karpov, Kasparov, Vladimir Kramnik, Viswanathan Anand, Carlsen.

== Rating records ==
FIDE (chess's international governing body) adopted Elo ratings in 1970. Players who peaked before this year therefore do not feature in rating records.

=== Highest rating ===
The highest rating ever achieved is 2882, by Magnus Carlsen on the May 2014 list and once again on the August 2019 list.

Progression of highest rating record
Player	Rating	Year-month first achieved
Bobby Fischer	2760	1971-01
Bobby Fischer	2785	1972-01
Garry Kasparov	2800	1990-01
Garry Kasparov	2805	1993-01
Garry Kasparov	2815	1993-07
Garry Kasparov	2820	1997-07
Garry Kasparov	2825	1998-01
Garry Kasparov	2851	1999-07
Magnus Carlsen	2861	2013-01
Magnus Carlsen	2872	2013-02
Magnus Carlsen	2881	2014-03
Magnus Carlsen	2882	2014-05

Carlsen also holds the highest unofficial "live rating" of 2889.2, achieved on April 21, 2014.

=== Largest rating lead ===
On the July 1972 FIDE rating list, Bobby Fischer's rating of 2785 was 125 points ahead of the second-highest rated player, then-reigning World Champion Boris Spassky (2660). Kasparov's biggest lead at his peak was 82 points in January 2000. In both the January and July 1990 rating lists, Kasparov was rated 2800 while Karpov was the only player rated 2700+, with third place being at 2680 although the identity of the third-place player changed. Magnus Carlsen's biggest lead was 74 points in October 2013.

Jeff Sonas of Chessmetrics calculates that in April 1876 Wilhelm Steinitz was the top-ranked player in the world, with a rating record 199 points above that of Henry Bird, the second-ranked player.

=== Longest duration as number one ===
Garry Kasparov was the world's highest-rated player on FIDE's rating list for a record 255 months, a number that is well ahead of all other world number ones since the inception of the list. Before the list, Emanuel Lasker was the world's highest-rated player for 292 months between June 1890 and December 1926 according to Chessmetrics.

== Age-related records ==
=== Youngest world champion ===
- Youngest undisputed world champion: D Gukesh; 18 years 6 months 14 days, title won 2024
- Youngest disputed FIDE world champion: Ruslan Ponomariov; 18 years, 3 months and 13 days, title won 2002
- Youngest Women's World Chess Champion: Hou Yifan; 16 years, 9 months and 27 days, title won 2010

=== Youngest grandmaster ===
The youngest player to be awarded the grandmaster title by FIDE is Abhimanyu Mishra. In 2021, he qualified for the title at the age of 12 years, 4 months, and 25 days. See List of youngest grandmasters for the history of this record.

=== Youngest to rating ===
Youngest player to rating
Rating	Year-month achieved	Player
2500	2025-10	Faustino Oro
2600	2024-10	Yağız Kaan Erdoğmuş
2700	2026-05	Yağız Kaan Erdoğmuş
2750	2023-08	Gukesh D
2800	2021-12	Alireza Firouzja
2850	2013-01	Magnus Carlsen

=== Oldest grandmaster ===
Several players have been awarded honorary or retrospective grandmaster titles based on their past achievements. The oldest of these who was still living at the time was Andreas Dückstein, who was awarded the title in 2024 at the age of 96. FIDE awarded Sultan Khan the Honorary Grandmaster title on February 2, 2024, almost 58 years after his death and over 120 years after his birth in 1903.

Apart from retrospective awards, a number of players have achieved the title by winning the World Senior Championship. The oldest player to gain the title in this way was Yuri Shabanov, who won the 2003 event and was awarded the title at the age of 66.

=== Oldest combined age of players in a match ===
In 2014, GM Viktor Korchnoi (1931–2016) played a two-game match against GM Wolfgang Uhlmann (1935–2020). Korchnoi won both games. The combined age of the two players was 162 years, which is almost certainly a record for a standard time control match between Grandmasters. At a rapid time control, Korchnoi played a four-game match against GM Mark Taimanov (1926–2016) in November 2015. Korchnoi won the match 2–1 with one draw. The combined ages of the players was 174. This was the first time since 1980 that Korchnoi had played in an official or friendly match with an opponent older than himself.

=== Youngest player to defeat a grandmaster ===
On February 18, 2024, Ashwath Kaushik, aged 8 years, 6 months, and 11 days, beat Grandmaster Jacek Stopa at the 22nd Burgdorfer Stadthaus Open in Switzerland.

=== Oldest player to defeat a grandmaster ===
In the aforementioned rapid match in November 2015 between Mark Taimanov and Viktor Korchnoi, Taimanov was approximately 89 years and 9 months old when he won one of the match games against Korchnoi. The oldest known player to beat a grandmaster in a tournament game at standard time controls is Anthony Saidy. In Round 3 of the National Open Chess Championship in Las Vegas, played sometime between June 17 and 19, 2019, Saidy, aged 82 years and 1 month, beat grandmaster Vladimir Belous (age 25).

== Simultaneous and blindfold records ==
=== Best and worst results in simultaneous exhibitions ===
In 1922, José Raúl Capablanca, the recently crowned World Champion, played 103 opponents simultaneously in Cleveland. He completed the exhibition in seven hours, scoring 102 wins and one draw (99.5%), the best result ever in a simultaneous exhibition on over 75 boards.

The best result in a simultaneous exhibition solely against grandmasters is former World Champion Garry Kasparov's performance against an Israeli team consisting of Boris Alterman, Alexander Huzman, Ilya Smirin, and Emil Sutovsky at Tel Aviv in 1998. Adding to the difficulty Kasparov played Black in half the games; usually in exhibitions the exhibitor plays White on all boards. A second round was played 2 days later with colors reversed. Kasparov scored 7–1 against an all 2600+ rated team and considers it one of the peak performances of his career.

Paul Morphy also gave an impressive exhibition. On April 26, 1859, at London's St. James Chess Club, Morphy played "five games simultaneously against a group of masters who could be described as among the top ten players of the day", scoring 3–2. He defeated Jules Arnous de Rivière and Henry Bird, drew with Samuel Boden and Johann Löwenthal, and lost only to Thomas Wilson Barnes.

The worst result in a simultaneous exhibition given by a master occurred in 1951, when International Master Robert Wade gave a simultaneous exhibition against 30 Russian schoolboys, aged 14 and under. After 7 hours of play, Wade had lost 20 games and drawn the remaining 10.

The absolute worst result in a simultaneous exhibition was two wins and 18 losses (10%) by Joe Hayden, aged 17, in August 1977. Hayden wanted to set an American record by playing 180 people simultaneously at a shopping center in Cardiff, New Jersey, but only 20 showed up to play. Hayden lost 18 of the games (including one to a seven-year-old). His two wins were scored against his mother and a player who got tired of waiting and left mid-game, thus forfeiting the game.

=== Most games in blindfold exhibitions ===
The record for the most games played in a blindfold simultaneous exhibition is 48, set by Timur Gareyev in December 2016, when he played 48 opponents over 20 hours, scoring 35 wins, 7 draws and 6 losses.

=== Most players taking part in a multi-simul ===
20,500 players played simultaneously on December 24, 2010, in Ahmadabad, India. Then-World Champion Viswanathan Anand was a guest of honor for this event and participated in the simul.

=== Most simultaneous games ===
On February 8–9, 2011, Iranian grandmaster Ehsan Ghaem-Maghami played for 25 hours against 604 players, winning 580 (97.35%) of the games, drawing 16, and losing 8.

=== Most simultaneous games with clock ===
On June 9, 2025, Belgian grandmaster Daniel Dardha played a timed simultaneous exhibition against 50 players. On every board, Dardha and each of his opponents started the game with a time of 2 hours on the clock. Dardha won 40 games, drew 7 games and lost 3 games (87%).

== Writing-related records ==
=== Longest-running chess column ===
Leonard Barden's daily chess column for the London Evening Standard began in June 1956, and was published daily in the printed newspaper until July 30, 2010, a total run of 54 years and 1 month. It then continued online until January 31, 2020, for a total of 63 years, 7 months and 27 days without missing a day.

== Bibliography ==
- Alexander, C.H.O'D. (1973), A Book of Chess, New York: Harper & Row, ISBN 0-06-010048-6
- Brady, Frank (1973), Profile of a Prodigy: The Life and Games of Bobby Fischer (2nd ed.), New York: David McKay, ISBN 978-0-679-50075-9
- Chernev, Irving (1974), Wonders and Curiosities of Chess, New York: Dover Publications, ISBN 978-0-486-23007-8
- Cload, Reg; Keene, Raymond (1991), Battles of Hastings, Oxford and New York: Pergamon Chess, ISBN 0-08-037791-2
- Damsky, Yakov (2005), The Batsford Book of Chess Records, London: Batsford, ISBN 0-7134-8946-4
- Di Felice, Gino (2004), Chess Results, 1747–1900, Jefferson, North Carolina and London: McFarland & Company, ISBN 0-7864-2041-3
- Fox, Mike; James, Richard (1993), The Even More Complete Chess Addict, London, Boston: Faber and Faber, ISBN 0-571-17040-4
- Friedel, Frederic (2009). "Linares: The Anibal Hall of Fame". chessbase.com.
- Harding, Tim (1999). "Is Khalifman the real World Champion?". chesscafe.com.
- Hearst, Eliot; Knott, John (2009), Blindfold Chess: History, Psychology, Techniques, Champions, World Records, and Important Games, Jefferson, North Carolina and London: McFarland & Company, Inc., ISBN 978-0-7864-3444-2
- Hook, Bill (2008), Hooked on Chess: A Memoir, Alkmaar: New in Chess, ISBN 978-90-5691-220-8
- Hooper, David; Whyld, Kenneth (1992), The Oxford Companion to Chess, London, New York: Oxford University Press, ISBN 0-19-866164-9
- Kažić, B.M. (1974), International Championship Chess: A Complete Record of FIDE Events, New York: Pitman, ISBN 0-273-07078-9
- Kotov, Alexander (January–February 1964), "Why the Russians?", Chessworld: 62–69
- Lombardy, William (2011), Understanding Chess: My System, My Games, My Life, New York: Russell Enterprises, ISBN 978-1-93649-022-6
- Morse, Jeremy (1995), Chess Problems: Tasks and Records, Faber and Faber, ISBN 0-571-15363-1. Concentrates on maximum tasks and records.
- Sergeant, Philip (1934), A Century of British Chess, Philadelphia: David McKay
- Soltis, Andy (2002), Chess Lists Second Edition, Jefferson, North Carolina and London: McFarland and Company, ISBN 0-7864-1296-8
- Sunnucks, Anne (1970), The Encyclopaedia of Chess, New York: St. Martin's Press
- Tal, Mikhail (1976), The Life and Games of Mikhail Tal, New York: RHM Press, ISBN 0-89058-027-8
- Wade, Robert; O'Connell, Kevin (1973), Bobby Fischer's Chess Games (2nd ed.), Garden City, New York: Doubleday, ISBN 0-385-08627-X
- Whyld, Ken (1986), Chess: The Records, Enfield, Middlesex: Guinness Books, ISBN 0-85112-455-0
- Winter, Edward (1996), Chess Explorations, London: Cadogan Books, ISBN 978-1-85744-171-0
- Winter, Edward (1998). "A Chess Idealist". chesshistory.com.
- Winter, Edward (2003), A Chess Omnibus, Milford, Connecticut: Russell Enterprises, Inc., ISBN 1-888690-17-8
- Winter, Edward (2008). "Chess Records". chesshistory.com.
