= Reykjavik Open =

Chess tournament

Tournament information
- Location: Reykjavík, Iceland
- Dates: 9–15 April 2025
- Format: 9-round Swiss tournament
- Purse: €17,350 (2025)

Current champion
- Parham Maghsoodloo

The Reykjavik Open is an annual chess tournament that takes place in the capital city of Iceland. It was held every two years up to 2008; currently, it runs annually. The first edition was held in 1964 and was won by Mikhail Tal with a score of 12.5 points out of 13. The tournament is currently played with the Swiss system, while from 1964 to 1980 and in 1992 it was a round-robin tournament.

The 2013 edition was voted the second best open tournament of the year in the world by the Association of Chess Professionals, behind Gibraltar Chess Festival.

The 2025 edition of this tournament was held from 9 April - 15 April 2025, at Harpa Concert Hall and Conference Center in Reykjavík, Iceland. It was won by Parham Maghsoodloo.

== Winners ==
All players finishing equal first are listed; the winner after tiebreaks is listed first. As of 2024, there have been 11 Icelandic winners of the tournament.

blue	: Round-robin tournament

#	Year	Winner(s)
1	1964	Mikhail Tal (Soviet Union)
2	1966	Friðrik Ólafsson (Iceland)
3	1968	Evgeny Vasiukov (Soviet Union), Mark Taimanov (Soviet Union)
4	1970	Guðmundur Sigurjónsson (Iceland)
5	1972	Friðrik Ólafsson (Iceland), Florin Gheorghiu (Romania), Vlastimil Hort (Czechoslovakia)
6	1974	Vassily Smyslov (Soviet Union)
7	1976	Friðrik Ólafsson (Iceland), Jan Timman (Netherlands)
8	1978	Walter Browne (United States)
9	1980	Viktor Kupreichik (Soviet Union)
10	1982	Lev Alburt (United States)
11	1984	Jóhann Hjartarson (Iceland), Helgi Ólafsson (Iceland), Samuel Reshevsky (United States)
12	1986	Predrag Nikolić (Yugoslavia)
13	1988	Jón Árnason (Iceland)
14	1990	Helgi Ólafsson (Iceland), Jón Árnason (Iceland), Sergey Dolmatov (Soviet Union), Lev Polugaevsky (Soviet Union), Rafael Vaganian (Soviet Union), Yasser Seirawan (United States), Nick de Firmian (United States), Yuri Razuvaev (Soviet Union), Erling Mortensen (Norway)
15	1992	Jóhann Hjartarson (Iceland), Alexei Shirov (Latvia)
16	1994	Hannes Stefánsson (Iceland), Vadim Zvjaginsev (Russia), Evgeny Pigusov (Russia)
17	1996	Simen Agdestein (Norway), Predrag Nikolić (Bosnia and Herzegovina), Jonathan Tisdall (Norway)
18	1998	Larry Christiansen (United States)
19	2000	Hannes Stefánsson (Iceland)
20	2002	Jaan Ehlvest (Estonia), Oleg Korneev (Russia)
21	2004	Alexei Dreev (Russia), Vladimir Epishin (Russia), Emil Sutovsky (Israel) , Jan Timman (Netherlands), Levon Aronian (Germany), Igor-Alexandre Nataf (France), Jaan Ehlvest (Estonia), Robert Markuš (Serbia and Montenegro)
22	2006	Gabriel Sargissian (Armenia), Ahmed Adly (Egypt), Shakhriyar Mamedyarov (Azerbaijan), Igor-Alexandre Nataf (France), Pentala Harikrishna (India)
23	2008	Wang Hao (China), Hannes Stefánsson (Iceland), Wang Yue (China)
24	2009	Héðinn Steingrímsson (Iceland), Yuriy Kryvoruchko (Ukraine), Hannes Stefánsson (Iceland), Mihail Marin (Romania)
25	2010	Ivan Sokolov (Bosnia and Herzegovina), Yuri Kuzubov (Ukraine), Abhijeet Gupta (India), Hannes Stefánsson (Iceland)
26	2011	Yuri Kuzubov (Ukraine), Ivan Sokolov (Netherlands), Vladimir Baklan (Ukraine), Kamil Miton (Poland), Jon Ludvig Hammer (Norway), Illia Nyzhnyk (Ukraine)
27	2012	Fabiano Caruana (Italy)
28	2013	Pavel Eljanov (Ukraine), Wesley So (Philippines), Bassem Amin (Egypt)
29	2014	Li Chao (China)
30	2015	Erwin l'Ami (Netherlands)
31	2016	Abhijeet Gupta (India)
32	2017	Anish Giri (Netherlands)
33	2018	Baskaran Adhiban (India)
34	2019	Constantin Lupulescu (Romania)
35	2020	The 2020 event was cancelled due to the coronavirus epidemic.
37	2022	Rameshbabu Praggnanandhaa (India)
38	2023	Nils Grandelius (Sweden)
39	2024	Bogdan-Daniel Deac (Romania)
40	2025	Parham Maghsoodloo (Iran)
41	2026	Amin Tabatabaei (Iran)
