= Norðdahl =

Norðdahl is an Icelandic surname. Notable people with the surname include:

- Birna Norðdahl (1920-2004), Icelandic chess master
- Eiríkur Örn Norðdahl (born 1978), Icelandic writer
- Magnús Norðdahl, Icelandic lawyer

== See also ==
- Nordahl
- Norddal (village)
- Norddal Municipality
