= Guðmundur Kjartansson =

Icelandic chess grandmaster (born 1988)

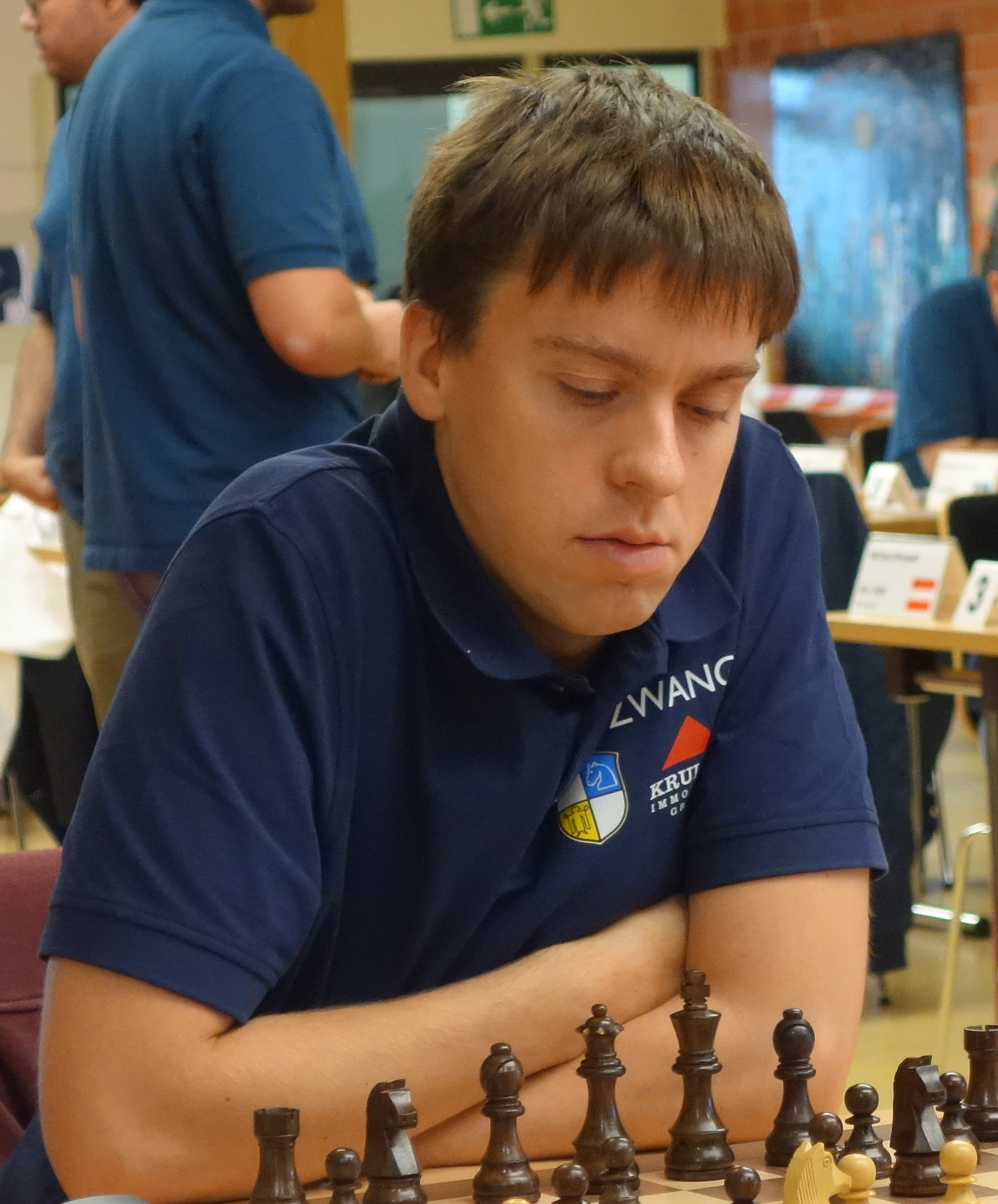

Personal information
- Born: March 6, 1988 (age 38) Reykjavík, Iceland

Chess career
- Country: Iceland
- Title: Grandmaster (2021)
- Peak rating: 2503 (April 2021)

Guðmundur Kjartansson is an Icelandic chess grandmaster.

== Chess career ==
In August 2020, he won the Icelandic Chess Championship for the third time after managing to hold Hjörvar Steinn Grétarsson to a draw in the final round (whereas the other tournament leader Helgi Grétarsson lost his game).

In May 2021, he finished third in the national championship, behind winner Hjörvar Steinn Grétarsson and runner-up Jóhann Hjartarson.

In May 2023, Guðmundur, Vignir Vatnar Stefansson and Hannes Stefánsson scored 8.5/11 and tied for first place in the national championship. The trio played against each other in blitz tiebreaks, and Guðmundur ultimately lost to Vignir Vatnar Stefánsson.
