= Icelandic Chess Championship =

Annual chess tournament in Iceland

The Icelandic Chess Championship is usually held in Reykjavík, the capital of Iceland. It is organised by the Icelandic Chess Federation (ICF), the body responsible for holding national chess events and for representing Icelandic chess at the World Chess Federation (FIDE). The ICF was founded in 1925 and its main activities include the national chess championship and the annual 'Reykjavik Open' tournament.

The tournament has always been organized as a round robin with the exception of the 100th anniversary tournament in 2013, which was held as a Swiss-style open tournament.

The current Icelandic chess champion is Hilmir Freyr Heimisson (2026).

== National championship winners ==
The list of Icelandic champions before 2013 is taken from the Icelandic Chess Federation website.

Year	Winner
1913	Pétur Zóphóniasson
1914	Pétur Zóphóniasson (2)
1915	Pétur Zóphóniasson (3)
1916	Pétur Zóphóniasson (4)
1917	Pétur Zóphóniasson (5)
1918	Eggert Gilfer
1919	Stefán Olafsson
1920	Eggert Gilfer (2)
1921	Stefán Olafsson (2)
1922	Stefán Olafsson (3)
1923	Friman Olafsson
1924	Sigurdur Jónsson
1925	Eggert Gilfer (3)
1926	Sigurdur Jónsson (2)
1927	Eggert Gilfer (4)
1928	Einar Thorvaldsson
1929	Eggert Gilfer (5)
1930	Hannes Hafstein
1931	Ásmundur Ásgeirsson
1932	Jón Guðmundsson
1933	Ásmundur Ásgeirsson (2)
1934	Ásmundur Ásgeirsson (3)
1935	Eggert Gilfer (6)
1936	Jón Gudmundsson (2)
1937	Jón Gudmundsson (3)
1938	Baldur Möller
1939*	(no championship held)
1940	Einar Thorvaldsson
1941	Baldur Möller (2)
1942	Eggert Gilfer (7)
1943	Baldur Möller (3)
1944	Ásmundur Ásgeirsson
1945	Ásmundur Ásgeirsson (2)
1946	Ásmundur Ásgeirsson (3)
1947	Baldur Möller (4)
1948	Baldur Möller (5)
1949	Guðmundur Arnlaugsson
1950	Baldur Möller (6)
1951	Lárus Johnsen
1952	Friðrik Ólafsson
1953	Friðrik Ólafsson (2)
1954	Gudmundur S Gudmundsson
1955*	(no championship held)
1956	Ingi Randver Jóhannsson
1957	Friðrik Ólafsson (3)
1958	Ingi Randver Jóhannsson (2)
1959	Ingi Randver Jóhannsson (3)
1960	Freysteinn Thorbergsson
1961	Friðrik Ólafsson (4)
1962	Friðrik Ólafsson (5)
1963	Ingi Randver Jóhannsson (4)
1964	Helgi Ólafsson
1965	Guðmundur Sigurjónsson
1966	Gunnar Kristinn Gunnarsson
1967	Björn Thorsteinsson
1968	Guðmundur Sigurjónsson (2)
1969	Friðrik Ólafsson (6)
1970	Olafur Magnússon
1971	Jón Kristinsson
1972	Guðmundur Sigurjónsson (3)
1973	Olafur Magnússon (2)
1974	Jón Kristinsson (2)
1975	Björn Thorsteinsson (2)
1976	Haukur Angantýsson
1977	Jón Arnason
1978	Helgi Ólafsson (2)
1979	Ingvar Ásmundsson
1980	Jóhann Hjartarson
1981	Helgi Ólafsson (3)
1982	Jón Arnason (2)
1983	Hilmar Karlsson
1984	Jóhann Hjartarson (2)
1985	Karl Thorsteins
1986	Margeir Pétursson
1987	Margeir Pétursson (2)
1988	Jón Arnason (3)
1989	Karl Thorsteins (2)
1990	Héðinn Steingrímsson
1991	Helgi Ólafsson (4)
1992	Helgi Ólafsson (5)
1993	Helgi Ólafsson (6)
1994	Jóhann Hjartarson
1995	Jóhann Hjartarson (2)
1996	Helgi Ólafsson (7)
1997	Jóhann Hjartarson (3)
1998	Hannes Stefánsson
1999	Hannes Stefánsson (2)
2000	Jón Viktor Gunnarsson
2001	Hannes Stefánsson (3)
2002	Hannes Stefánsson (4)
2003	Hannes Stefánsson (5)
2004	Hannes Stefánsson (6)
2005	Hannes Stefánsson (7)
2006	Hannes Stefánsson (8)
2007	Hannes Stefánsson (9)
2008	Hannes Stefánsson (10)
2009	Henrik Danielsen
2010	Hannes Stefánsson (11)
2011	Héðinn Steingrímsson
2012	Thröstur Thórhallsson
2013	Hannes Stefánsson (12)
2014	Guðmundur Kjartansson
2015	Héðinn Steingrímsson (2)
2016	Jóhann Hjartarson
2017	Guðmundur Kjartansson (2)
2018	Helgi Áss Grétarsson
2019	Hannes Stefánsson (13)
2020	Guðmundur Kjartansson (3)
2021	Hjörvar Steinn Grétarsson
2022	Hjörvar Steinn Grétarsson (2)
2023	Vignir Vatnar Stefánsson
2024	Helgi Áss Grétarsson (2)
2025	Vignir Vatnar Stefánsson (2)
2026	Hilmir Freyr Heimisson

Note – no contest was held on the years denoted *. The incumbent champion therefore retained his title.

== Women's championship winners ==
The list of women's champions before 2013 is taken from the Icelandic Chess Federation website.

Year	Winner
1975	Guðlaug Torsteinsdóttir
1976	Birna Norðdahl
1977	Ólöf Tráinsdóttir
1978	Ólöf Tráinsdóttir (2)
1979	Áslaug Kristinsdóttir
1980	Birna Norðdahl (2)
1981	Sigurlaug Friðþjófsdóttir
1982	Guðlaug Torsteinsdóttir
1983	Áslaug Kristinsdóttir (2)
1984	Ólöf Tráinsdóttir (3)
1985	Guðfríður Lilja Grétarsdóttir
1986	Guðfrídur Lilja Gretarsdóttir (2)
1987	Guðfrídur Lilja Gretarsdóttir (3)
1988	Guðfrídur Lilja Gretarsdóttir (4)
1989	Guðlaug Torsteinsdóttir (2)
1990	Guðfrídur Lilja Gretarsdóttir (5)
1991	Guðfrídur Lilja Gretarsdóttir (6)
1992	Guðfrídur Lilja Gretarsdóttir (7)
1993	Guðfrídur Lilja Gretarsdóttir (8)
1994	Áslaug Kristinsdóttir (3)
1995	Ína Björg Árnadóttir
1996	Anna Björg Þorgrímsdóttir
1997	Guðfrídur Lilja Gretarsdóttir (9)
1998	Ingibjörg Edda Birgisdóttir
1999	Ingibjörg Edda Birgisdóttir (2)
2000	Harpa Ingólfsdóttir
2001	Guðfrídur Lilja Gretarsdóttir (10)
2002	Guðlaug Torsteinsdóttir (3)
2003	Guðfrídur Lilja Gretarsdóttir (11)
2004	Harpa Ingólfsdóttir (2)
2005	Guðlaug Torsteinsdóttir (4)
2006	Lenka Ptáčníková
2007	Guðlaug Torsteinsdóttir (5)
2008	Hallgerður Helga Þorsteinsdóttir
2009	Lenka Ptáčníková (2)
2010	Lenka Ptáčníková (3)
2011	Elsa María Kristínardóttir
2012	Lenka Ptáčníková (4)
2013	Lenka Ptáčníková (5)
2014	Lenka Ptáčníková (6)
2015	Lenka Ptáčníková (7)
2016	Lenka Ptáčníková (8)
2017	Lenka Ptáčníková (9)
2018	Lenka Ptáčníková (10)
2019	Lenka Ptáčníková (11)
2020	Lenka Ptáčníková (12)
2021	Lenka Ptáčníková (13)
2022	Lenka Ptáčníková (14)
2023	Olga Prudnykova
2024	Olga Prudnykova (2)
2025	Lenka Ptáčníková (15)
2026	Lenka Ptáčníková (16)
