= Guðlaug =

Old Norse name

Guðlaug is a feminine given name of Old Norse origin meaning “good wife.”

== Women ==
- Guðlaug Edda Hannesdóttir (born 1994), Icelandic Olympic triathlete
- Guðlaug Torsteinsdóttir (born 1961), Icelandic chess master
