= Þorvaldsson =

Þorvaldsson is a surname of Icelandic origin, meaning son of Þorvaldur. In Icelandic names, the name is not strictly a surname, but a patronymic. The name refers to:

- Einar Thorvaldsson (1902–1967), Icelandic chess master
- Gissur Þorvaldsson (1208–1268), Icelandic chieftain, goði of the Haukdælir family clan
- Gudmundur Thorvaldsson, Icelandic actor
- Gunnar Heiðar Þorvaldsson (b. 1982), Icelandic professional football player
- Sigurður Þorvaldsson (b. 1980), Icelandic professional basketball player
