= Eggert Gilfer =

Icelandic chess player (1892–1960)

Personal information
- Born: 12 February 1892 Njarðvík, Danish Iceland
- Died: 24 March 1960 (aged 68)

Chess career
- Country: Iceland

Eggert Gilfer (12 February 1892 – 24 March 1960) was an Icelandic chess player and seven-time winner of the Icelandic Chess Championship (1918, 1920, 1925, 1927, 1929, 1935, 1942). Prior to the emergence of Fridrik Olafsson, he was the most decorated Icelandic chess player.

== Biography ==
From the late 1910s to mid-1950s, Eggert Gilfer was one of the leading Icelandic chess players. He won the Icelandic Chess Championship seven times from 1918 to 1942.

Eggert Gilfer played for Iceland in the Chess Olympiads:

- In 1930, at first board in the 3rd Chess Olympiad in Hamburg (+5, =2, -10),
- In 1933, at second board in the 5th Chess Olympiad in Folkestone (+4, =3, -7),
- In 1937, at first board in the 7th Chess Olympiad in Stockholm (+1, =4, -10),
- In 1952, at first board in the 10th Chess Olympiad in Helsinki (+1, =2, -5).

Eggert Gilfer played for Iceland in the unofficial Chess Olympiad:

- In 1936, at first board in the 3rd unofficial Chess Olympiad in Munich (+4, =6, -9).
