= Vignir Vatnar Stefansson =

Icelandic chess grandmaster (born 2003)

Personal information
- Born: February 7, 2003 (age 23)

Chess career
- Country: Iceland
- Title: Grandmaster (2023)
- FIDE rating: 2510 (November 2026)
- Peak rating: 2551 (March 2025)

Vignir Vatnar Stefansson is an Icelandic chess grandmaster.

== Chess career ==
In May 2023, he tied for the first place with Guðmundur Kjartansson and Hannes Stefánsson in the Icelandic Chess Championship. The trio played against each other in blitz tiebreaks, and Vignir ultimately defeated Guðmundur to become the national champion.

In July 2023, he finished in second place in the České Budějovice Chess Festival Rating Open A 2023, losing to Ameya Audi.
