= Kristinsdóttir =

Kristinsdóttir is an Icelandic surname. Notable people with the surname include:

- Elfa Rún Kristinsdóttir (born 1985), Icelandic violinist
- Elsa María Kristínardóttir (born 1989), Icelandic chess player
- María Rut Kristinsdóttir (fl. 2024), Icelandic politician
- Ólafía Þórunn Kristinsdóttir (born 1992), Icelandic golfer
