= Karl Thorsteins =

Icelandic chess player (born 1964)

Personal information
- Born: October 13, 1964 (age 61)

Chess career
- Country: Iceland
- Title: International Master (1985)
- FIDE rating: 2407 (July 2026)
- Peak rating: 2510 (January 1994)

Karl Thorsteins (born October 13, 1964) is an Icelandic chess player who has been an International Master since 1985. He won the Icelandic Chess Championship twice: in 1985 and 1989. In 1988, he played in the Reykjavík Invitational Tournament, finishing in tenth place with a total of 5 points. A game he lost to Jóhann Hjartarson in this tournament was highlighted by Robert Byrne in the New York Times.
