= Thórhallsson =

Thórhallsson or Þórhallsson is a surname. Notable people with the surname include:

- Baldur Thorhallsson (born 1968), Professor at the University of Iceland
- Dagur Dan Þórhallsson (born 2000), Icelandic football midfielder
- Höskuldur Þórhallsson (born 1973), Icelandic politician, former member of the Althing
- Magnús Þórhallsson, Icelandic priest and scribe
- Ragnar Þórhallsson (born 1987), Icelandic musician
- Thorlac Thorhallsson (Saint Thorlak) (1133–1193), the patron saint of Iceland
- Throstur Thorhallsson (born 1969), Icelandic chess grandmaster
- Tryggvi Þórhallsson (1889–1935), prime minister of Iceland 1927–1932
