= Guðmundur Sigurjónsson =

Icelandic chess grandmaster (born 1947)

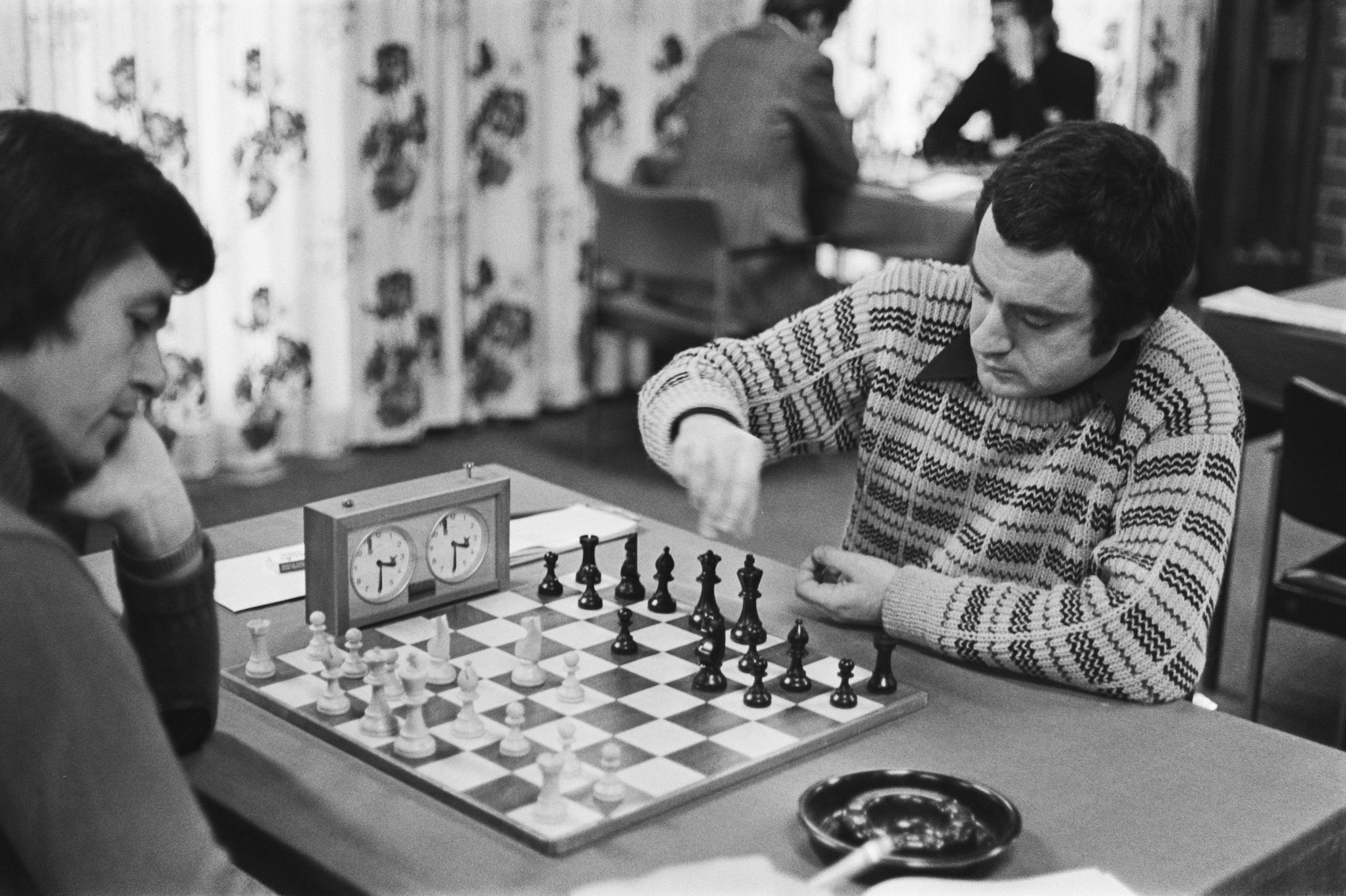
- Guðmundur (left) vs. Gennadi Sosonko (Hoogovens, 1977)

Personal information
- Born: 25 September 1947 (age 78) Reykjavík, Iceland

Chess career
- Country: Iceland
- Title: Grandmaster (1975)
- FIDE rating: 2463 (July 2026) [inactive]
- Peak rating: 2530 (January 1976)

Guðmundur Sigurjónsson (born 25 September 1947) is an Icelandic chess grandmaster. He is a three-time Icelandic Chess Champion.

== Chess career ==
Born in 1947, Guðmundur earned his international master title in 1970 and his grandmaster title in 1975. He was the 2nd Icelandic player to get the grandmaster title after Friðrik Ólafsson. He won the Icelandic Chess Championship three times (1965, 1968 and 1972). He played for Iceland in the Chess Olympiads of 1966, 1968, 1970, 1972, 1974, 1978, 1980, 1982, 1984 and 1986. His tournament successes included 1st at Reykjavík 1970, =1st at Sant Feliu de Guíxols 1974, =2nd at Hastings 1974–75, =1st at Ourense 1976, =2nd at Cienfuegos 1976 and =1st at Brighton 1982. He has a FIDE rating of 2463 as of October 2017, though he is no longer active.

== Notable games ==
- Laszlo Szabo vs Gudmundur Sigurjonsson, Reykjavík 1968, Semi-Slav Defense: Meran Variation (D47), 0–1
- Gudmundur Sigurjonsson vs Alexandru Sorin Segal, Ybbs 1968, Budapest Defense: Adler Variation (A52), 1–0
- Gudmundur Sigurjonsson vs Leif Ogaard, Esbjerg 1978, Sicilian Defense: Paulsen Variation (B46), 1–0
