= Lárus Johnsen =

Icelandic chess player (1923–2006)

Personal information
- Born: 12 September 1923
- Died: 26 August 2006 (aged 82)

Chess career
- Country: Iceland

Lárus Johnsen (12 September 1923 – 26 August 2006) was an Icelandic chess player, and Icelandic Chess Championship winner (1951).

== Biography ==
From the early 1950s to mid-1960s, Lárus Johnsen was one of the leading Icelandic chess players. He played mainly in domestic chess tournaments and Icelandic Chess Championships. In 1951, Lárus Johnsen won the Icelandic Chess Championship. In 1963, he participated in Nordic Chess Championship.

Lárus Johnsen played for Iceland in the Chess Olympiad:

- In 1952, at third board in the 10th Chess Olympiad in Helsinki (+2, =4, -5).
