= Guðmundur Guðmundsson (chess player) =

Icelandic chess player (1918–1974)

Personal information
- Born: 11 May 1918
- Died: 20 April 1974 (aged 55)

Chess career
- Country: Iceland

Guðmundur Guðmundsson (11 May 1918 – 20 April 1974) was an Icelandic chess player, and the 1954 Icelandic Chess Championship winner.

== Biography ==
From the late 1930s to late 1950s, Guðmundur Guðmundsson was also one of the leading Icelandic chess players. In 1947, he played in Hastings International Chess Congress and Nordic Chess Championship. In 1954, Guðmundur Guðmundsson won the Icelandic Chess Championship.

Guðmundur Guðmundsson played for Iceland in the Chess Olympiad:

- In 1954, at second board in the 11th Chess Olympiad in Amsterdam (+2, =6, -5).
