= Ásmundur Ásgeirsson =

Icelandic chess player (1906–1986)

Personal information
- Born: 14 March 1906
- Died: 2 November 1986 (aged 80)

Chess career
- Country: Iceland

Ásmundur Ásgeirsson (14 March 1906 – 2 November 1986) was an Icelandic chess player, and six-times Icelandic Chess Championship winner (1931, 1933, 1934, 1944, 1945, 1946).

== Biography ==
From the beginning of the 1930s to the end of 1940s, Ásmundur Ásgeirsson was one of the leading Icelandic chess players. He won the Icelandic Chess Championship six times between 1931 and 1946.

Ásmundur Ásgeirsson played for Iceland in the Chess Olympiads:

- In 1930, at second board in the 3rd Chess Olympiad in Hamburg (+3, =1, -13),
- In 1933, at first board in the 5th Chess Olympiad in Folkestone (+2, =3, -9),
- In 1937, at third board in the 7th Chess Olympiad in Stockholm (+5, =6, -5),
- In 1939, at second board in the 8th Chess Olympiad in Buenos Aires (+8, =3, -4).

Ásmundur Ásgeirsson played for Iceland in the unofficial Chess Olympiad:

- In 1936, at second board in the 3rd unofficial Chess Olympiad in Munich (+3, =7, -9).
