= Ólöf Tráinsdóttir =

Icelandic chess player

Personal information
- Born: unknown

Chess career
- Country: Iceland

Ólöf Tráinsdóttir is an Icelandic chess player, and three times winner the Icelandic Women's Chess Championship (1977, 1978, 1984).

== Biography ==
From the end of 1970s to the mid-1980s, Ólöf Tráinsdóttir was one of Iceland's leading female chess players. She won the Icelandic Women's Chess Championships thrice: 1977, 1978, and 1984.

Tráinsdóttir played for Iceland in the Women's Chess Olympiads:

- In 1978, at second board in the 8th Chess Olympiad (women) in Buenos Aires (+5, =3, -5),
- In 1980, at second board in the 9th Chess Olympiad (women) in Valletta (+6, =2, -4),
- In 1982, at second board in the 10th Chess Olympiad (women) in Lucerne (+2, =2, -5),
- In 1984, at second board in the 26th Chess Olympiad (women) in Thessaloniki (+5, =3, -6).

Tráinsdóttir played for Iceland in the Nordic Chess Cup:

- In 1977, at fifth board in the 8th Nordic Chess Cup in Glücksburg (+2, =0, -3).
