= Olga Prudnykova =

Icelandic chess player (born 1994)

Personal information
- Born: 16 January 1994 (age 32)

Chess career
- Country: Ukraine; Iceland
- Title: Woman International Master (2017)
- Peak rating: 2294 (May 2017)

Olga Prudnykova (Ukrainian: Ольга Пруднікова; née Ivanenko (Ukrainian: Ольга Іваненко); born 16 January 1994) is a Ukraine-born Icelandic chess Woman International Master (2017), and won the Icelandic Women's Chess Championships in 2023.

== Chess career ==
In the 2010s, Olga Prudnykova was one of the strongest young Ukrainian chess players. In 2010 she played for Ukraine at the World Youth Chess Championship in girls U16 age group and ranked in 25th place. In 2016 she ranked 7th in Ukrainian Women's Chess Championships.

In April 2017 in Riga she ranked in 55th place in Women's European Individual Chess Championship. In 2018 she ranked in 85th place in Women's European Individual Chess Championship.

After Russian invasion of Ukraine she moved to Iceland and from November 2022 represented Iceland in chess tournaments. In September 2023 she won Icelandic Women's Chess Championships.

Prudnykova played for Iceland in the European Women's Team Chess Championships:

- In 2023, at first board in the 15th European Team Chess Championship (women) in Budva (+2, =2, -5).
