= Gunnar Kristinn Gunnarsson =

Icelandic chess player (born 1933)

Personal information
- Born: 14 June 1933 (age 93)

Chess career
- Country: Iceland

Gunnar Kristinn Gunnarsson (born 14 June 1933) is an Icelandic chess player and winner of the 1966 Icelandic Chess Championship.

== Biography ==
From the early 1960s to the end of the 1970s, Gunnar Kristinn Gunnarsson was one of the leading Icelandic chess players. In 1967, in Vrnjačka Banja he participated in World Chess Championship Zonal Tournament. Gunnar Kristinn Gunnarsson has regularly participated in Icelandic Chess Championships, which he won in 1966, and Reykjavík International Chess tournaments (1972, 1976).

Gunnar Kristinn Gunnarsson played for Iceland in the Chess Olympiads:

- In 1960, at third board in the 14th Chess Olympiad in Leipzig (+5, =0, -12),
- In 1966, at first reserve board in the 17th Chess Olympiad in Havana (+0, =2, -5).

From 1974 to 1976 and from 1982 to 1984 Gunnar Kristinn Gunnarsson was President of the Icelandic Chess Federation.
