= Vladislav Borovikov =

Ukrainian chess grandmaster (born 1973)

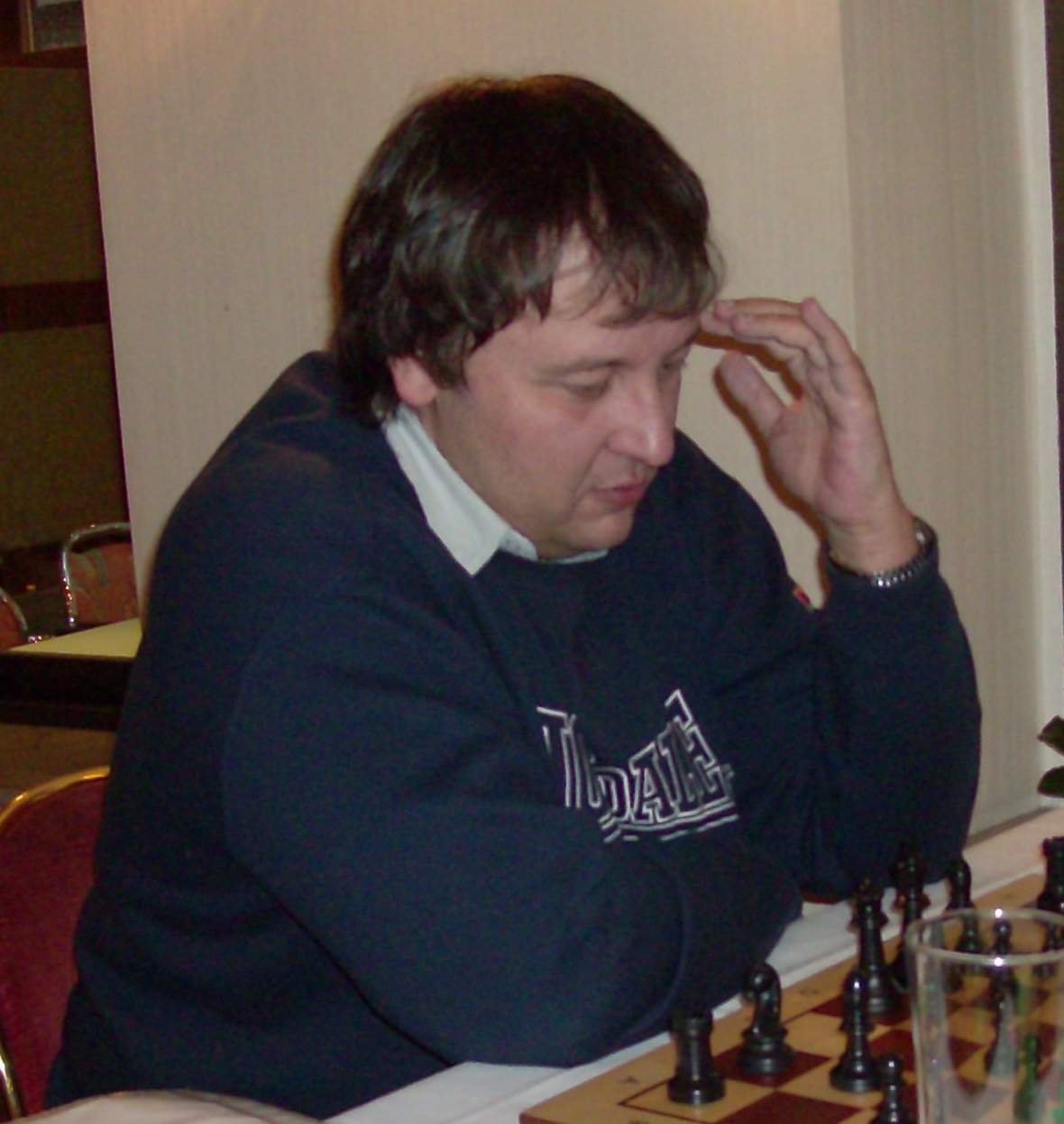
- Borovikov in 2010

Personal information
- Born: August 10, 1973 (age 52) Dnipro, Ukrainian SSR, Soviet Union

Chess career
- Country: Ukraine
- Title: Grandmaster (2001)
- FIDE rating: 2525 (July 2026)
- Peak rating: 2601 (July 2010)

Vladislav Romanovich Borovikov is a Ukrainian chess grandmaster.

== Chess career ==
He was the trainer of chess prodigy Sergey Karjakin, who became the youngest grandmaster in 2004. He is also a past winner of the Kiev Cup.

In 2010, he tied for 1st–6th with Mircea Pârligras, Gabriel Sargissian, Sergey Volkov, Bela Khotenashvili and Yuriy Kryvoruchko in the 2nd International Tournament in Rethymno.

In November 2013, he was the joint tournament leader after the fifth round of the Hyderabad International Grandmasters chess tournament. He ultimately finished in 10th place with a score of 7/11.
