= Freysteinn Thorbergsson =

Icelandic chess player (1931–1974)

Personal information
- Born: 12 May 1931
- Died: 23 October 1974 (aged 43)

Chess career
- Country: Iceland

Freysteinn Thorbergsson (12 May 1931 – 23 October 1974) was an Icelandic chess player, who won the 1960 Icelandic Chess Championship and 1965 Nordic Chess Championship winner.

== Biography ==
From the late 1950s to the early 1970s Freysteinn was also one of the leading Icelandic chess players. He won the Icelandic Chess Championship in 1960 and became 2nd in 1971. Also Freysteinn Þorbergsson won Nordic Chess Championship in 1965. He was repeated participant in traditional international chess tournaments in Reykjavík (1960, 1966, 1968, 1970, 1974).

Freysteinn played for Iceland in the Chess Olympiads:

- In 1956, at fourth board in the 12th Chess Olympiad in Moscow (+6, =6, -1),
- In 1958, at third board in the 13th Chess Olympiad in Munich (+3, =6, -7),
- In 1960, at first board in the 14th Chess Olympiad in Leipzig (+3, =6, -6),
- In 1966, at fourth board in the 17th Chess Olympiad in Havana (+2, =3, -7),
- In 1970, at third board in the 19th Chess Olympiad in Siegen (+5, =4, -3).

Thorbergsson played for Iceland in the World Student Team Chess Championship:

- In 1958, at third board in the 5th World Student Team Chess Championship in Varna (+4, =4, −1).
