= Baldur Möller =

Icelandic chess player (1914–1999)

Baldur Möller (Reykjavík, 19 August 1914 – 23 November 1999) was an Icelandic chess master.

He became Icelandic champion multiple times (winning in 1938, 1941, 1943, 1947, 1948, 1950, and retained his title in 1939).

Möller won Nordic Chess Championship twice, in 1948 and 1950.

He played thrice for Iceland in Chess Olympiads:

- In 1937, at fourth board in 7th Chess Olympiad in Stockholm (+3 –11 =2);
- In 1939, at fourth board in 8th Chess Olympiad in Buenos Aires (+6 –5 =4);
- In 1956, at fourth board in 12th Chess Olympiad in Moscow (+7 –1 =8).
