= Jón Kristinsson (chess player) =

Icelandic chess player (born 1942)

Jón Kristinsson (born 17 June 1942) is an Icelandic chess player, and two times winner of Icelandic Chess Championship (1971, 1974).

== Biography ==
From the beginning of the 1960s to the mid-1970s, Jón Kristinsson was one of the leading Icelandic chess players. He twice won Icelandic Chess Championships: in 1971 and 1974. In 1967, in Halle Jón Kristinsson participated in World Chess Championship European Zonal Tournament where he shared in 10th–14th place.

Jón Kristinsson played for Iceland in the Chess Olympiads:

- In 1962, at second reserve board in the 15th Chess Olympiad in Varna (+2, =8, -4),
- In 1964, at fourth board in the 16th Chess Olympiad in Tel Aviv (+9, =2, -3),
- In 1968, at fourth board in the 18th Chess Olympiad in Lugano (+6, =7, -2),
- In 1970, at second board in the 19th Chess Olympiad in Siegen (+8, =5, -4),
- In 1972, at second board in the 20th Chess Olympiad in Skopje (+6, =8, -1),
- In 1974, at fourth board in the 21st Chess Olympiad in Nice (+4, =5, -4).

Jón Kristinsson played for Iceland in the World Student Team Chess Championship:

- In 1955, at fourth board in the 2nd World Student Team Chess Championship in Lyon (+4, =5, -3).

Jón Kristinsson played for Iceland in the Nordic Chess Cups:

- In 1973, at second board in the 4th Nordic Chess Cup in Ribe (+0, =2, -3),
- In 1976, at second board in the 7th Nordic Chess Cup in Bremen (+0, =3, -2).
