= John Curdo =

American chess player (1931–2022)

Personal information
- Born: John Anthony Curdo; November 14, 1931 Lynn, Massachusetts
- Died: September 30, 2022 (aged 90)

Chess career
- Country: United States
- Title: FIDE Master (1990)
- Peak rating: 2345 (July 1993)

John Anthony Curdo (November 14, 1931 – September 30, 2022) was an American chess player from Auburn, Massachusetts, best known for winning the Massachusetts state championship 17 times between 1948 and 1985, and the US Senior Championship in 1982 (tied with Larry Evans). Though Curdo never attained the rank of Grandmaster or International Master, he was known for over 50 years as one of the strongest players in New England, with victories over Grandmasters Pal Benko, Robert Byrne, and Arthur Bisguier, among many others. At his peak, his United States Chess Federation rating exceeded 2500.

As of August 2009, Curdo had won 830 tournaments over the course of his career, a number believed to be a world record by a wide margin. By December 2011, he had attained 865 tournament wins, and by 2018 he had extended the number to 1000 tournament victories. His opening repertoire remained relatively consistent throughout his career, and he was well known as an expert on the Dutch Defense and the Belgrade Gambit of the Four Knights Game. Curdo published four game collections, including the annotated game collection Forty Years at the Top and the Chess Caviar series (Chess Caviar, More Chess Caviar and Still More Chess Caviar).

== Selected game ==
Curdo vs. Byrne, Rosemont 1994

Position: a8 black rook, f8 black bishop, g8 black king, a7 black pawn, b7 black pawn, h7 black pawn, a6 black queen, c6 black bishop, e6 white pawn, f6 black rook, g6 black pawn, h6 white queen, c5 black pawn, e5 white bishop, g5 black pawn, h4 white pawn, a2 white pawn, b2 white pawn, c2 white pawn, f2 white pawn, g2 white pawn, c1 white king, d1 white rook, h1 white rook

White to move: 20.?

Curdo vs. GM Robert Byrne, US Open, August 10, 1994. In a wild Sicilian, Curdo uncorks a blistering mating combination.

1.e4 c5 2.Nf3 d6 3.Bb5+ Nd7 4.d4 Nf6 5.e5 Qa5+ 6.Nc3 Ne4 7.Bd2 Nxc3 8.Bxd7+ Bxd7 9.Bxc3 Qa6 10.d5 e6 11.Ng5 dxe5 12.Qf3 f6 13.dxe6 Bc6 14.Qf5 Be7 15.O-O-O g6 16.Qh3 fxg5 17.Bxe5 O-O 18.Qh6 Rf6 19.h4 Bf8 20.Qxh7+ Kxh7 21.hxg5+ Kg8 22.gxf6 1-0
