= Héðinn Steingrímsson =

Icelandic chess grandmaster (born 1975)

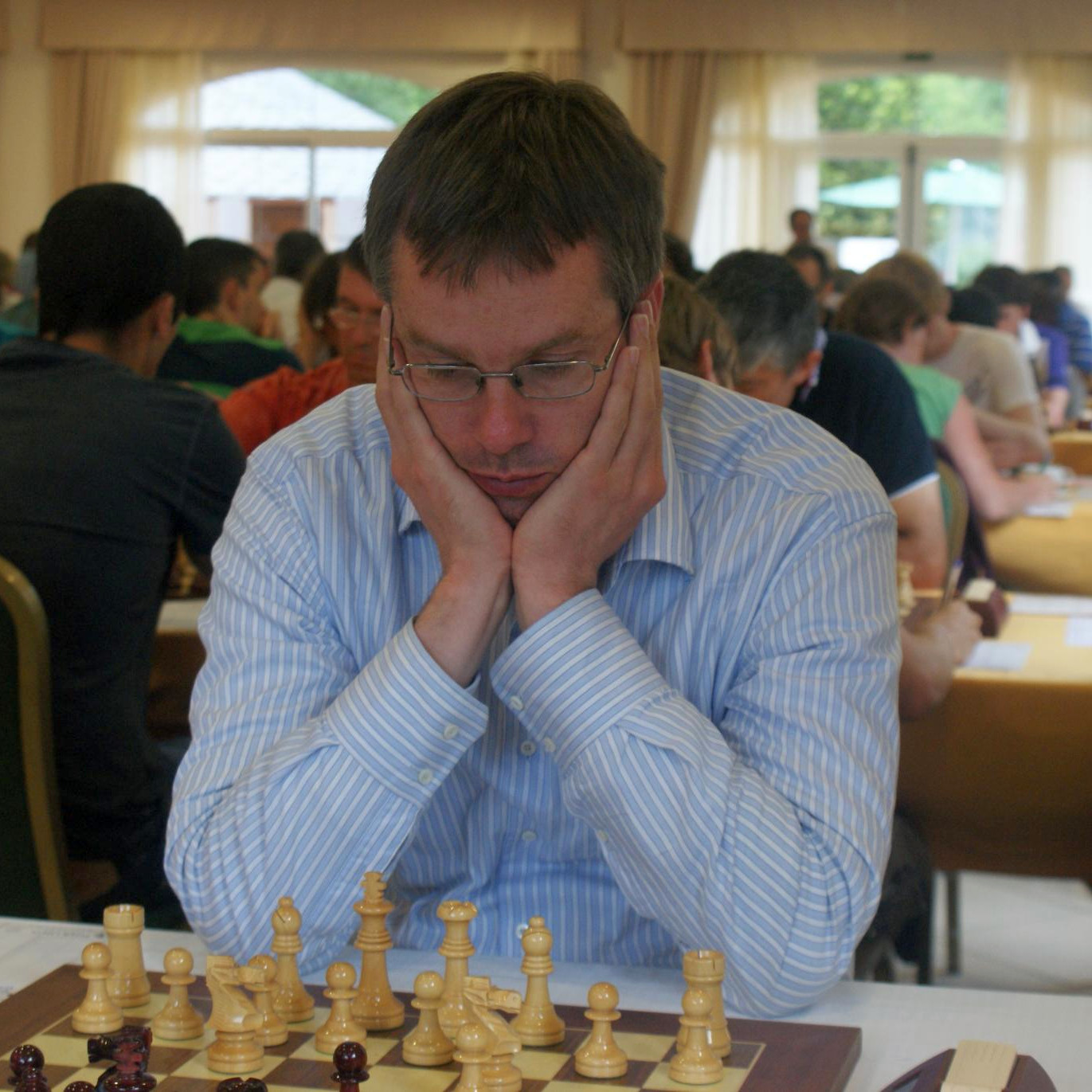
- Héðinn Steingrímsson, 2013

Personal information
- Born: 11 January 1975 (age 51) Reykjavík, Iceland

Chess career
- Country: Iceland
- Title: Grandmaster (2007)
- FIDE rating: 2485 (October 2026)
- Peak rating: 2583 (June 2018)

Héðinn Steingrímsson (born 11 January 1975) is an Icelandic chess grandmaster. He is a three-time Icelandic Chess Champion and was World U12 Chess Champion in 1987. He is the No. 2 ranked Icelandic player as of January 2025.

== Chess career ==
Born in 1975, Héðinn won the World U12 Chess Championship in 1987. The next year, he competed at the World U14 Championship, held in Romania. Ceaușescu was the still in power at the time and there was not enough food for the competitors; Héðinn suffered from malnutrition during the event and fell ill. In 1990, he won the Icelandic Chess Championship, aged 15. The same year, he competed at the 29th Chess Olympiad, scoring 1½/3 as Iceland finished eighth out of 108 teams. At this time, his Elo rating was over 2500. He earned his international master title in 1994 and his grandmaster title in 2007.

Héðinn competed in the Icelandic Championship in 1991, but did not play in another until 2006, where he finished second. He also did not play in Chess Olympiads during this period, returning in 2008 to score 4/7. In 2009, he won the Reykjavik Open on tie-break over Yuriy Kryvoruchko and Hannes Stefánsson. He played again for Iceland at the 39th Chess Olympiad, scoring 6/10. He has since won the Icelandic Championship twice more: in 2011 and 2015.

In December 2019, Steingrimsson tied for second place with IM (now GM) Brandon Jacobson in the Charlotte Chess Center's Holiday GM Norm Invitational held in Charlotte, North Carolina with an undefeated score of 5.5/9.
