= Ingi Randver Jóhannsson =

Icelandic chess player (1936–2010)

Personal information
- Born: 5 December 1936
- Died: 30 October 2010 (aged 73)

Chess career
- Country: Iceland
- Title: International Master (1963)
- Peak rating: 2445 (January 1981)

Ingi Randver Jóhannsson (5 December 1936 – 30 October 2010) was an Icelandic chess International Master (1963), and four-time Icelandic Chess Championship winner (1956, 1958, 1959, 1963).

== Biography ==
From the mid-1950s to mid-1980s, Ingi Randver Jóhannsson was also one of the leading Icelandic chess players. He won the Icelandic Chess Championship four times: 1956, 1958, 1959, and 1963.

Ingi Randver Jóhannsson played for Iceland in the Chess Olympiads:

- In 1954, at reserve board in the 11th Chess Olympiad in Amsterdam (+2, =4, -7),
- In 1956, at second board in the 12th Chess Olympiad in Moscow (+5, =9, -4),
- In 1958, at first board in the 13th Chess Olympiad in Munich (+7, =6, -3),
- In 1966, at second board in the 17th Chess Olympiad in Havana (+4, =8, -4),
- In 1968, at first board in the 18th Chess Olympiad in Lugano (+6, =4, -5),
- In 1974, at third board in the 21st Chess Olympiad in Nice (+6, =9, -2),
- In 1980, at second reserve board in the 24th Chess Olympiad in La Valletta (+2, =2, -0),
- In 1982, at second reserve board in the 25th Chess Olympiad in Lucerne (+0, =1, -2).

Ingi Randver Jóhannsson played for Iceland in the European Team Chess Championship preliminaries:

- In 1983, at seventh board (+0, =0, -3).

Ingi Randver Jóhannsson played for Iceland in the Telechess Olympiads:

- In 1978, at third board (+0, =2, -1),
- In 1982, at fifth board (+1, =0, -0).

Ingi Randver Jóhannsson played for Iceland in the Nordic Chess Cups:

- In 1973, at third board (+3, =2, -0) and won individual gold medal,
- In 1977, at second board (+1, =1, -3).

In 1963, he was awarded the FIDE International Master (IM) title.
