= Elsa María Kristínardóttir =

Icelandic chess player (born 1989)

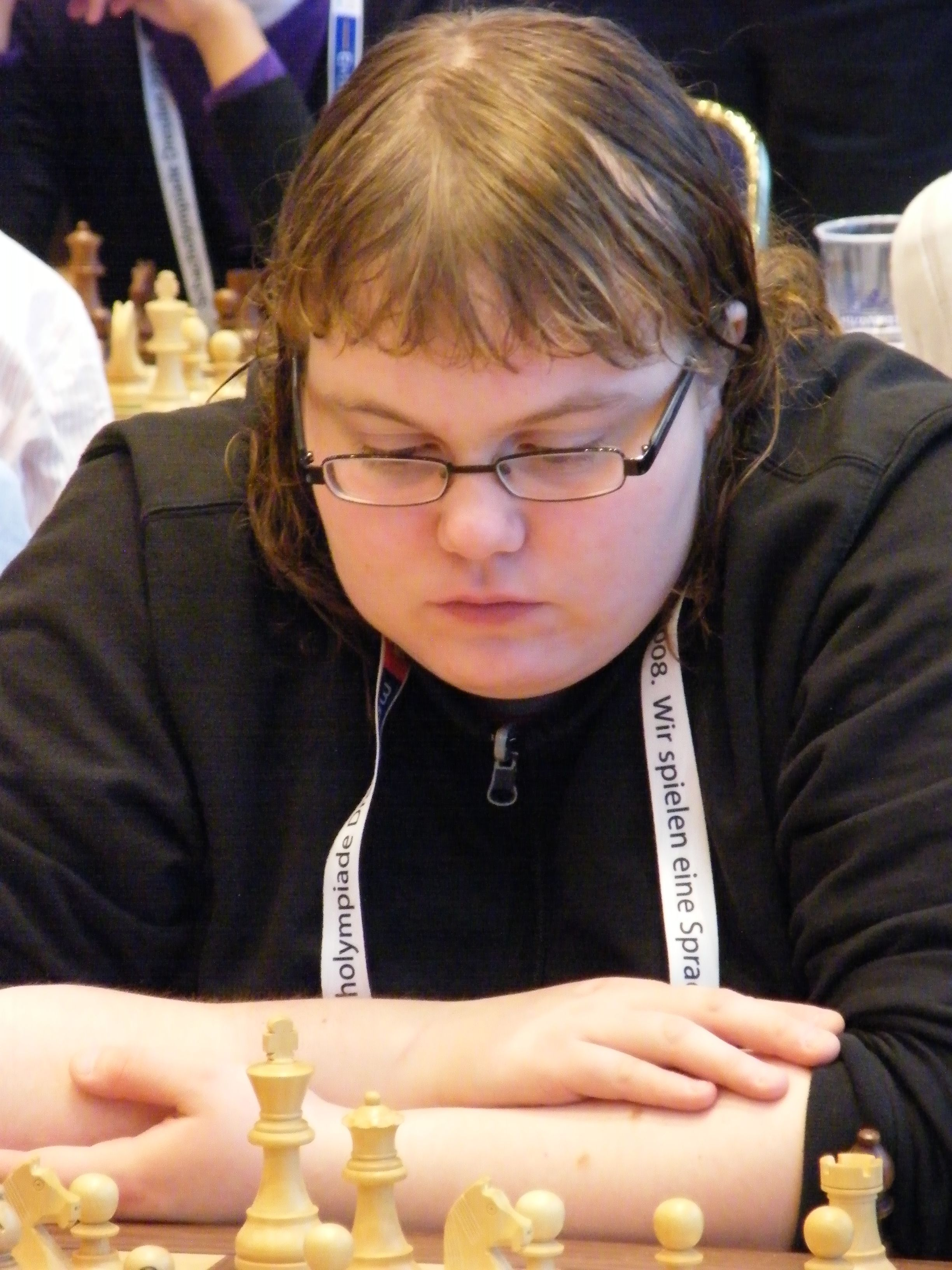
- Kristinardottir at the 38th Chess Olympiad in Dresden, 2008

Personal information
- Born: 1989 (age 36–37) Akureyri, Iceland

Chess career
- Country: Iceland
- Peak rating: 1910 (March 2024)

Elsa María Kristínardóttir (born 1989) is an Icelandic chess player. She won the women's Icelandic Chess Championship in 2011 and The Northern Chess Championship in 2023.

== Biography ==
Kristínardóttir is from Akureyri, Iceland. She participates in tournaments at the Reykjavik Chess Club.

In 2008, Kristínardóttir played for the Icelandic national women's team at the 38th Chess Olympiad in Dresden, Germany.

Kristínardóttir won the women's Icelandic Chess Championship in 2011, with 6.5 wins in 7 games. During the Championship, she beat four national women's team members who had played at the 39th Chess Olympiad in Khanty-Mansiysk, Russia.

In 2013, competed at the European Team Chess Championship in Warsaw, Poland.

In 2023, Kristínardóttir won The Northern Chess Championship with 7.5 wins out of 9, becoming the first female champion in the 88 years of the mixed event.
