= Nordahl =

Nordahl is a Nordic name, thought to be of Swedish or Norwegian origin. Notable people with the name:

== Given name ==
- Nordahl Lelandais (born 1983), French ex-military involved in criminal cases
- Nordahl Brue, American lawyer and entrepreneur
- Nordahl Grieg, Norwegian poet, novelist, dramatist, and journalist
- Nordahl Rolfsen, Norwegian writer, educationalist and teacher
- Nordahl Wallem, Norwegian sailor who competed in the 1936 Summer Olympics

== Surname ==
- Blane David Nordahl, American burglar
- Danny Nordahl, American bass guitarist
- Gustaf Nordahl (1903–1992), Swedish sculptor
- Johan Nordahl Brun (1745–1816) Norwegian poet, dramatist, bishop in Bergen
- Hans Nordahl (1918–1993), Norwegian footballer
- Moy Nordahl (1907–1993), Norwegian physiotherapist and politician
- Thomas Nordahl, (born 1946) Swedish footballer, member of the national team for the 1970 FIFA World Cup, son of Gunnar

=== Nordahl brothers ===
- Bertil Nordahl, (born 1917, dead 1998) Swedish footballer, Olympic gold medalist in 1948
- Knut Nordahl, (born 1920, dead 1984) Swedish footballer, Olympic gold medalist in 1948
- Gunnar Nordahl, born 1921, dead 1995) Swedish footballer, Olympic gold medalist in 1948
