= Helgi Ólafsson =

Icelandic chess grandmaster (born 1956)

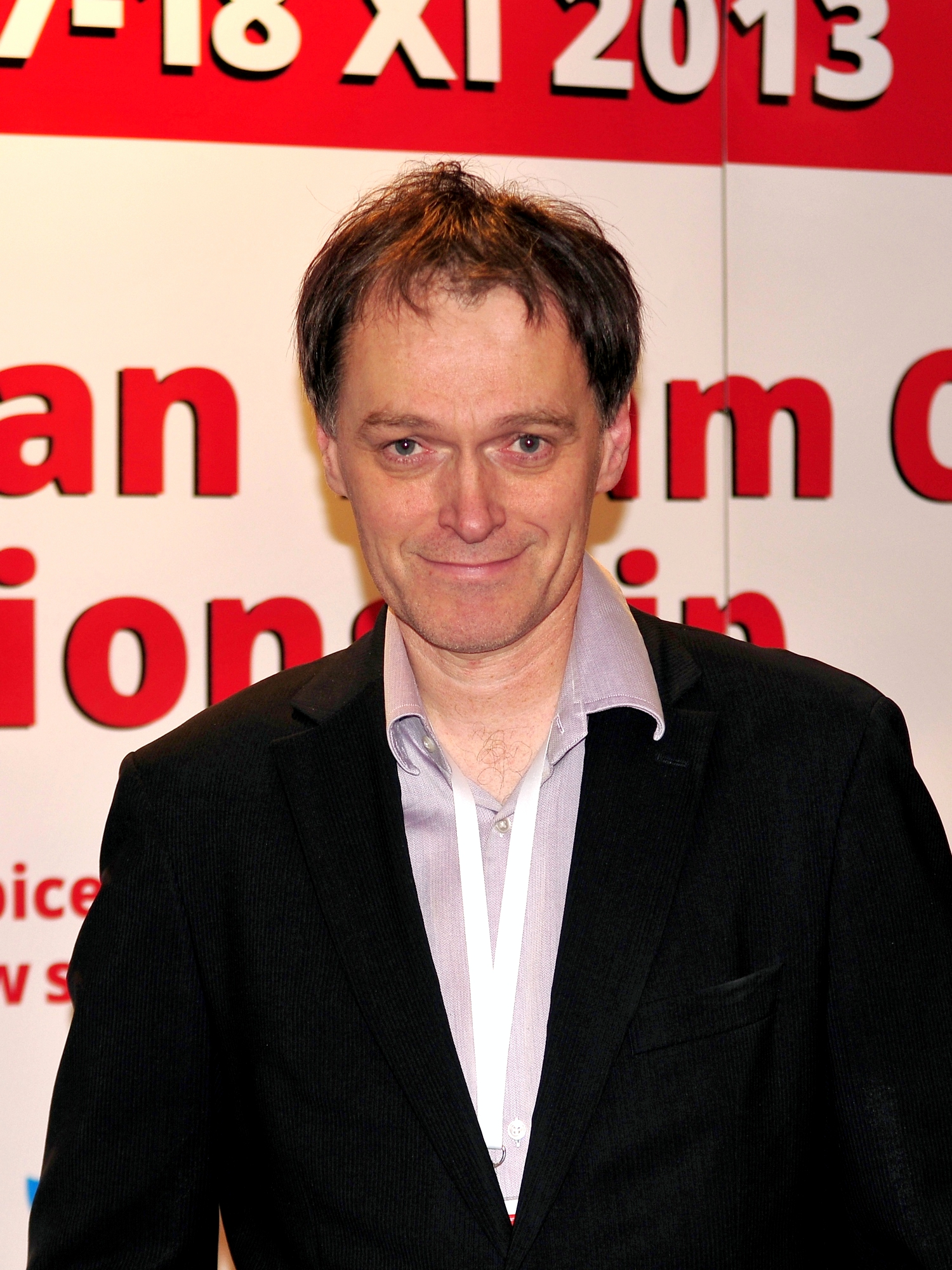
- Helgi Ólafsson, 2013

Personal information
- Born: 15 August 1956 (age 69) Heimaey, Iceland

Chess career
- Country: Iceland
- Title: Grandmaster (1985)
- FIDE rating: 2447 (July 2026)
- Peak rating: 2595 (July 1990)
- Peak ranking: No. 32 (July 1986)

Helgi Ólafsson (born 15 August 1956) is an Icelandic chess grandmaster. He is a six-time Icelandic Chess Champion.

== Chess career ==
A native of Heimaey, the largest and sole populated island in the Vestmannaeyjar archipelago off the south coast of Iceland, Helgi was sixteen when the Bobby Fischer–Boris Spassky World Chess Championship 1972, dubbed the chess world's "Match of the Century", was held in Reykjavík. He subsequently became one of a group of Icelandic chess prodigies who emerged in its aftermath, achieving the title of grandmaster in 1985. He is the No. 5 ranked Icelandic player as of October 2017.

He is author of the book Bobby Fischer Comes Home: The Final Years in Iceland, a Saga of Friendship and Lost Illusions (2014), New In Chess, ISBN 9789056914363.
