= Birna Norðdahl =

Icelandic chess player (1919–2004)

Personal information
- Born: 30 March 1919
- Died: 8 February 2004

Chess career
- Country: Iceland

Birna Norðdahl (30 March 1919 – 8 February 2004) was an Icelandic chess player, and two-times winner the Icelandic Women's Chess Championship (1976, 1980).

== Biography ==
From the end of 1960s to the beginning of the 1980s, Norðdahl was one of Iceland's leading female chess players. She twice won Icelandic Women's Chess Championships: 1976 and 1980. She is one of the very few chess players to win national chess championship past the age of 60.

Norðdahl played for Iceland in the Women's Chess Olympiads:

- In 1978, at third board in the 8th Chess Olympiad (women) in Buenos Aires (+2, =0, -6),
- In 1980, at first reserve board in the 9th Chess Olympiad (women) in Valletta (+1, =4, -1).

Norðdahl played for Iceland in the Nordic Chess Cup:

- In 1975, at fifth board in the 6th Nordic Chess Cup in Hindås (+2, =0, -3).
