= Einar Thorvaldsson =

Icelandic chess player (1902–1967)

Einar Thorvaldsson (1902–1967) was an Icelandic chess player who won the Icelandic Chess Championship twice.

== Biography ==
From the end of the 1920s to the beginning of 1940s, Einar was one of the leading Icelandic chess players. He twice won the Icelandic Chess Championship: in 1928 and in 1940.

Einar played for Iceland in the Chess Olympiads:

- In 1930, at third board in the 3rd Chess Olympiad in Hamburg (+4, =7, -6),
- In 1933, at third board in the 5th Chess Olympiad in Folkestone (+2, =5, -7),
- In 1939, at fourth board in the 8th Chess Olympiad in Buenos Aires (+3, =4, -3).

Einar played for Iceland in the unofficial Chess Olympiad:

- In 1936, at third board in the 3rd unofficial Chess Olympiad in Munich (+4, =5, -10).
