= Magnús Norðdahl =

Icelandic lawyer

Magnus M. Norðdahl (Magnus M. Norddahl) is a lawyer in Iceland, currently serving as Chief Lawyer for the Icelandic Confederation of Labour - ASI and a former member of Alþingi.
