= Yuriy Kryvoruchko =

Ukrainian chess grandmaster (born 1986)

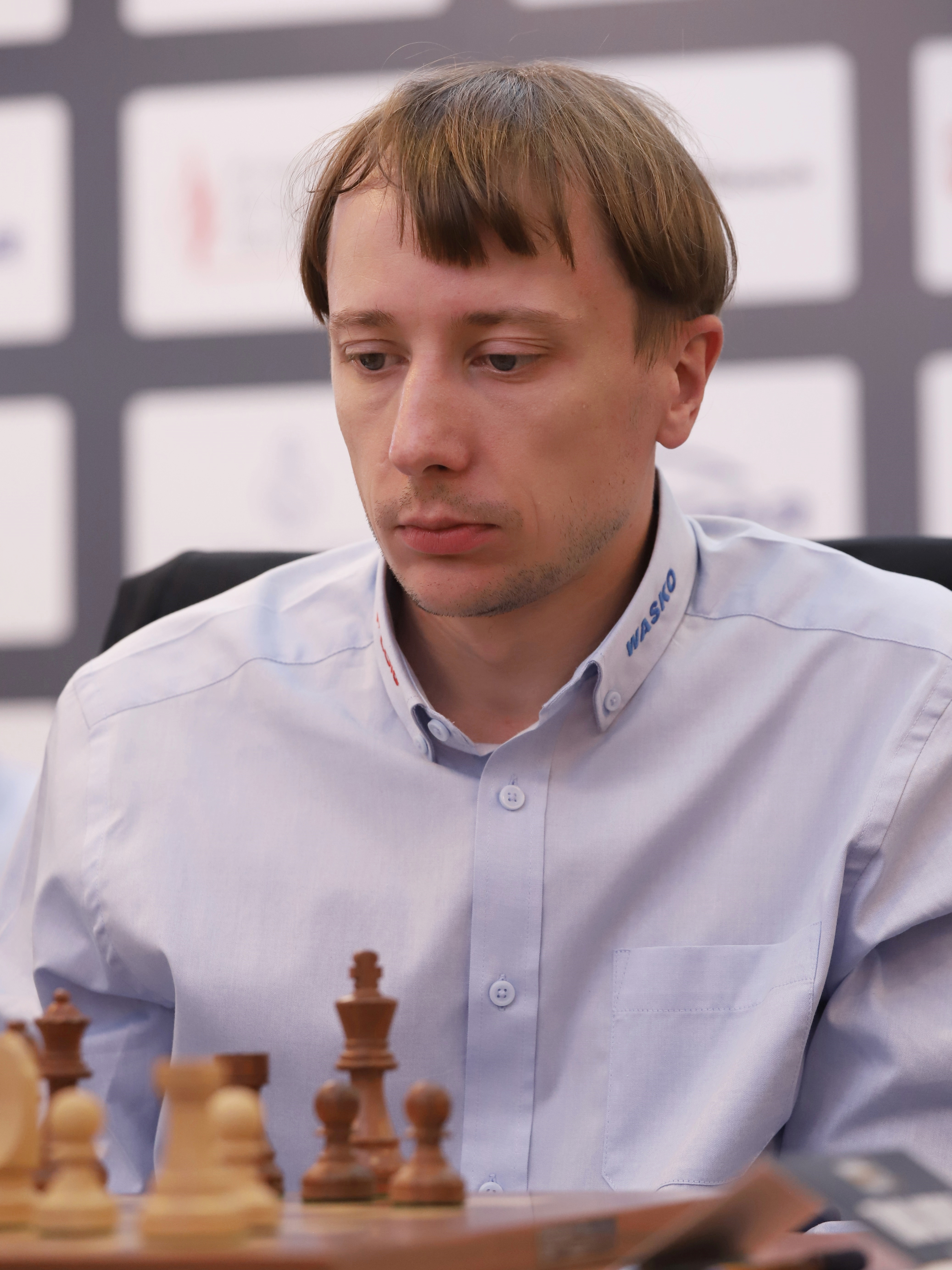
- Kryvoruchko in 2022

Personal information
- Born: Юрій Григорович Криворучко; 19 December 1986 (age 39) Lviv, Ukrainian SSR, Soviet Union
- Education: Lviv University's Faculty of Mathematics and Mechanical Engineering

Chess career
- Country: Ukraine
- Title: Grandmaster (2006)
- FIDE rating: 2614 (July 2026)
- Peak rating: 2717 (November 2015)
- Peak ranking: No. 33 (May 2017)

Yuriy Hryhorovych Kryvoruchko (Ukrainian: Юрій Григорович Криворучко; born 19 December 1986) is a Ukrainian chess player. He was awarded the title of Grandmaster by FIDE in 2006. Kryvoruchko was Ukrainian champion in 2013. He competed in the FIDE World Cup in 2009 and 2013.

== Career ==
Born in Lviv, Kryvoruchko was 5 years old when he was taught how to play chess by his father. He entered his first tournaments at age 7. He came third in the 2004 European Youth Chess Championship in Ürgüp and in the 2006 World Junior Chess Championship in Yerevan. In 2008 he tied for 1st–8th places with Vugar Gashimov, David Arutinian, Sergey Fedorchuk, Konstantin Chernyshov, Andrei Deviatkin, Vasilios Kotronias and Erwin L'Ami in the Cappelle-la-Grande Open tournament. In 2009 he was a member of the bronze medal-winning Ukrainian team at the European Team Chess Championship and tied for 1st–4th with Hedinn Steingrimsson, Hannes Stefánsson and Mihail Marin in the Reykjavik Open tournament. In 2010, he tied for 1st–6th with Mircea Pârligras, Gabriel Sargissian, Sergey Volkov, Bela Khotenashvili and Vladislav Borovikov in 2nd International Tournament in Rethymno and tied for 1st–3rd with Dmitry Svetushkin and Alexander Zubarev at Palaiochora. In 2013 Kryvoruchko won the Ukrainian championship edging out Ruslan Ponomariov on tiebreak, after both finished on a score of 7½/11 points.

== Personal life ==
In 2008 he graduated from Lviv University's Faculty of Mathematics and Mechanical Engineering.
