= Guðlaug Torsteinsdóttir =

Icelandic chess player (born 1961)

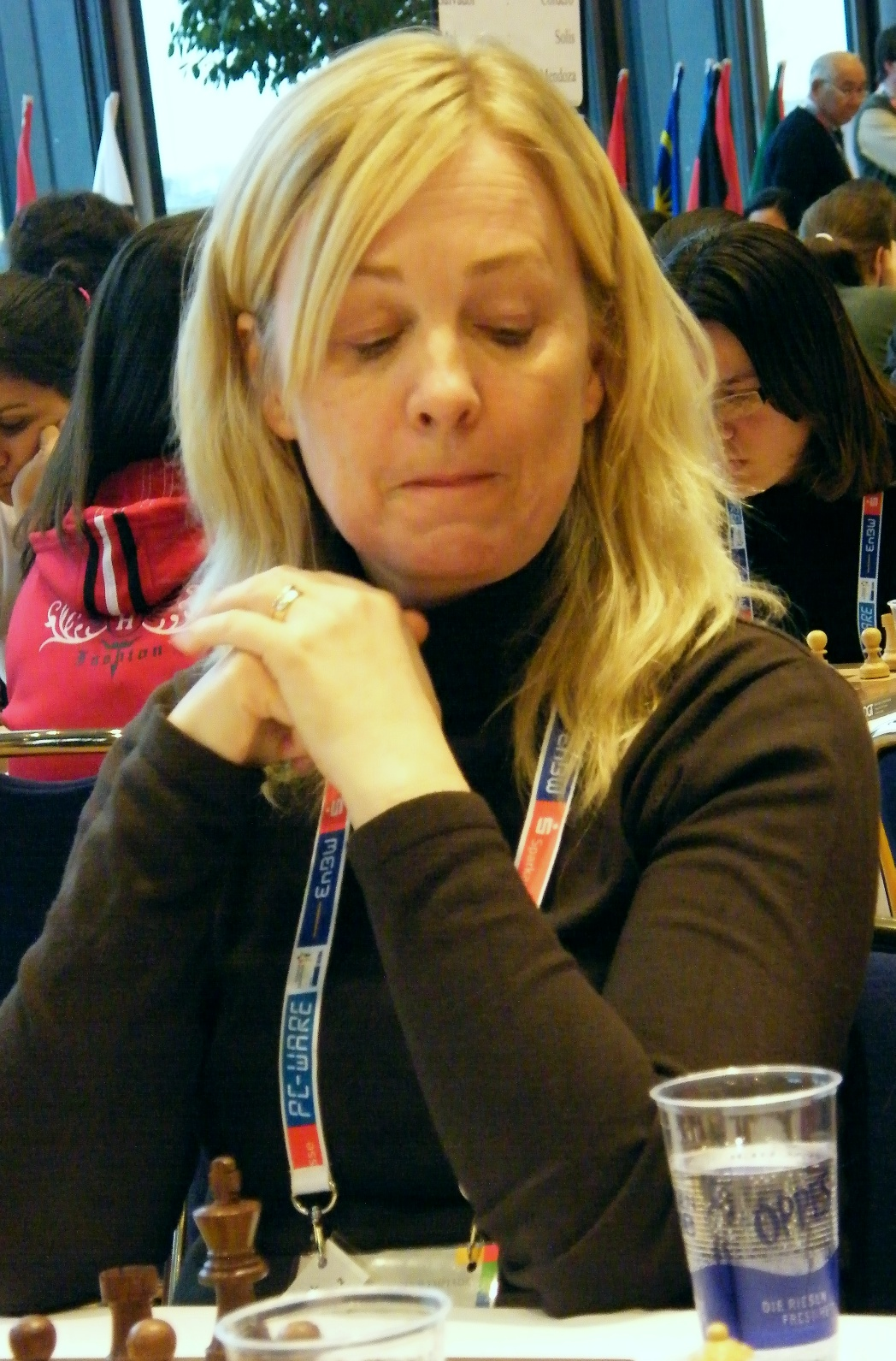
- Torsteinsdóttir in 2008

Personal information
- Born: 2 March 1961 (age 65)

Chess career
- Country: Iceland
- Title: Woman FIDE Master (2006)
- Peak rating: 2156 (April 2008)

Guðlaug Torsteinsdóttir (born 2 March 1961) is an Icelandic chess Woman FIDE master (WFM), six-times winner of the Icelandic Women's Chess Championship (1975, 1982, 1989, 2002, 2005, 2007) with the first of the titles coming at the age of 14 and the last one at the age of 46 – 32 years apart.

== Biography ==
From the end of 1970s to the end of 2010s, Guðlaug Torsteinsdóttir was one of Iceland's leading female chess players. She six times won Icelandic Women's Chess Championships: 1975, 1982, 1989, 2002, 2005, and 2007. In 1985, in Eksjö Guðlaug Torsteinsdóttir participated in Women's World Chess Championship Nordic European Subzonal tournament and shared 4th-5th place with Jolanta Dahlin.

Guðlaug Torsteinsdóttir played for Iceland in the Women's Chess Olympiads:

- In 1978, at first board in the 8th Chess Olympiad (women) in Buenos Aires (+6, =3, -4),
- In 1982, at first board in the 10th Chess Olympiad (women) in Lucerne (+6, =3, -2),
- In 1984, at first board in the 26th Chess Olympiad (women) in Thessaloniki (+4, =5, -5),
- In 2004, at second board in the 36th Chess Olympiad (women) in Calvià (+4, =2, -5),
- In 2006, at second board in the 37th Chess Olympiad (women) in Turin (+5, =4, -2),
- In 2008, at second board in the 38th Chess Olympiad (women) in Dresden (+4, =1, -4).

Guðlaug Torsteinsdóttir played for Iceland in the European Women's Team Chess Championships:

- In 2005, at third board in the 6th European Team Chess Championship (women) in Gothenburg (+1, =2, -6),
- In 2015, at second board in the 11th European Team Chess Championship (women) in Reykjavík (+5, =1, -3).

Guðlaug Torsteinsdóttir played for Iceland in the Nordic Chess Cups:

- In 1973, at fifth board in the 4th Nordic Chess Cup in Ribe (+0, =2, -3),
- In 1974, at sixth board in the 5th Nordic Chess Cup in Eckernförde (+2, =1, -2) and won team bronze medal,
- In 1976, at sixth board in the 7th Nordic Chess Cup in Bremen (+3, =2, -0) and won individual gold medal.
