= Helgi Grétarsson =

Icelandic chess grandmaster (born 1977)

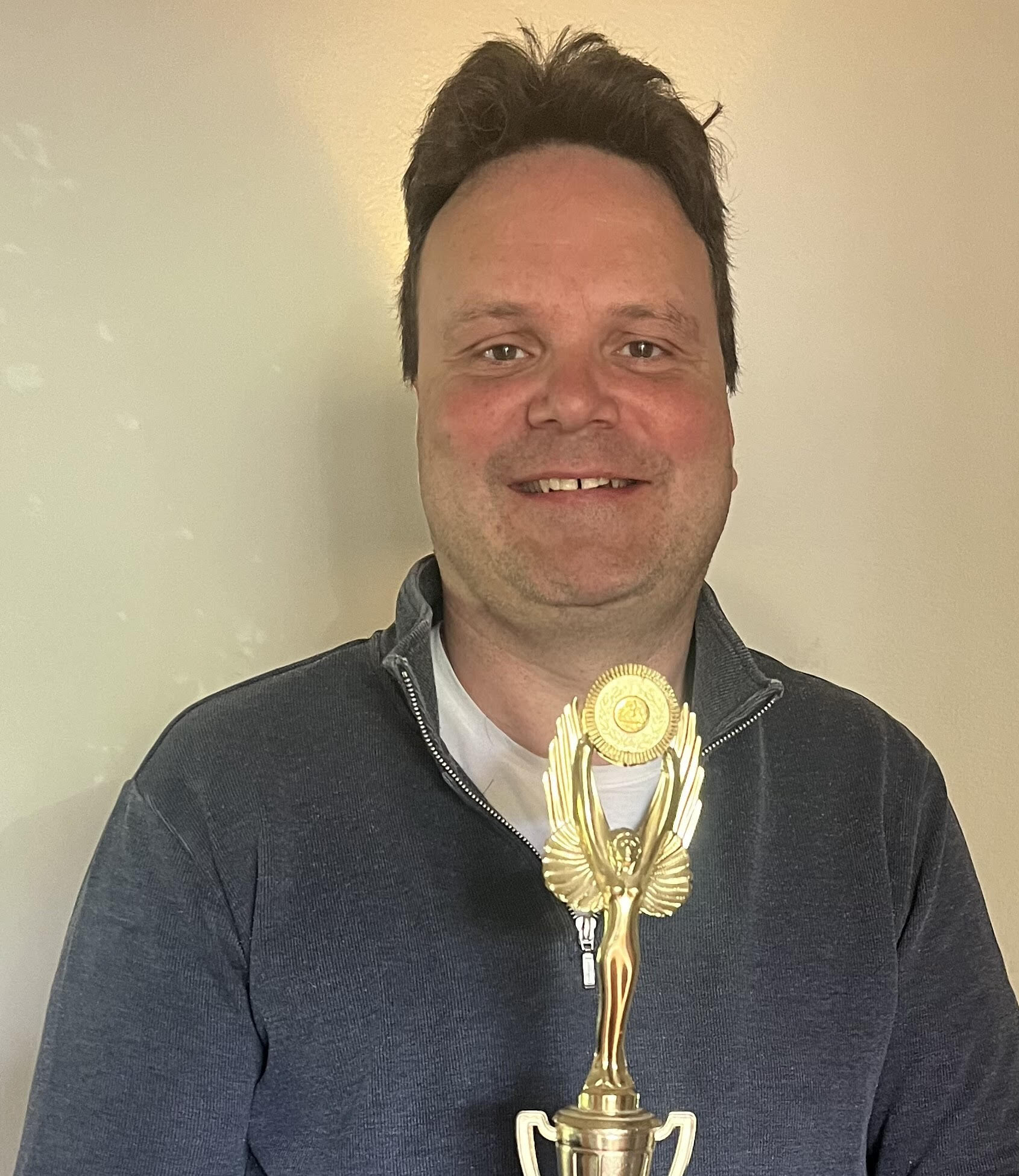
- Helgi Áss Grétarsson with his World Junior Championship Trophy, 30 years on in 2024.

Personal information
- Born: Helgi Dagbjartur Áss Grétarsson; 18 February 1977 (age 49) Reykjavík, Iceland
- Height: 6’6
- Spouses: Lenka Ptáčníková (divorced) Ólöf Vala Ingvarsdóttir

Chess career
- Country: Iceland
- Title: Grandmaster (1994)
- FIDE rating: 2420 (July 2026)
- Peak rating: 2563 (July 2000)

Helgi Áss Grétarsson (born 18 February 1977) is an Icelandic chess grandmaster (GM). In 1994 he won the under-20 World Junior Chess Championship. One year prior to that, he played as a goalkeeper for the Icelandic national soccer team in the 1993 UEFA European Under-16 Championship. Helgi graduated in 2005 with a law degree. In 2018, he became Icelandic Chess Champion for the first time. In April 2024, Helgi became the Icelandic Chess Champion for the second time. Since 2022 Helgi has been a deputy member of Reykjavík City Council.

== Chess career ==
Helgi was very successful in international youth tournaments, for example he got a silver medal in the World U-14 chess championships in Warsaw 1991 and he repeated that feat in the World U-16 chess championship in Bratislava 1993. By winning the World Junior Chess Championship (U-20), held in the Brazilian municipality Matinhos 3–15 September 1994, Helgi automatically became a GM. Hence, Helgi directly went from being a FIDE-master to a GM.

From 1 January 1995 until the summer of 1999 Helgi's FIDE rating changed little, ranging from 2440 to 2480. Nevertheless, during this period he had some notable tournament's successes, for example he tied for first place in 1997 at the open international tournament Politiken Cup in Copenhagen and in December that same year he competed in the FIDE World Chess Championship in Groningen where he knocked out Miguel Illescas in the first round, then in round 2 he was eliminated from the competition after losing to Artur Yusupov.

In 1999 Helgi showed solid and strong performances in many international tournaments as well as sharing first place in the Icelandic Chess Championship with 9½ points out of 11. GM Hannes Stefansson (https://en.wikipedia.org/wiki/Hannes_Stef%C3%A1nsson) eventually became champion, after beating Helgi in a match. Helgi reached his peak rating, 2563, on 1 July 2000. At this juncture he was ranked number 184 in the world.

After Helgi started his law studies in the fall of 2000, his chess activities diminished, but they picked up in 2002, for example that year he won the Icelandic Rapid Chess Championships for the second time and he shared third place in Reykjavik open with 6½ out of 9. In the Chess Olympiad, held in Bled Slovenia 25 October-11 November 2002, Helgi played for the Icelandic national team on board 2 and scored 7 points out 11, but this was his fourth Olympiad, his previous participation's for the national team in the open section were in 1994, 1996 and 1998. Following the conclusion of the Olympiad in Bled, Helgi's participation in chess tournaments became a rare occurrence until his successful comeback in the Icelandic Chess Championship in June 2018.

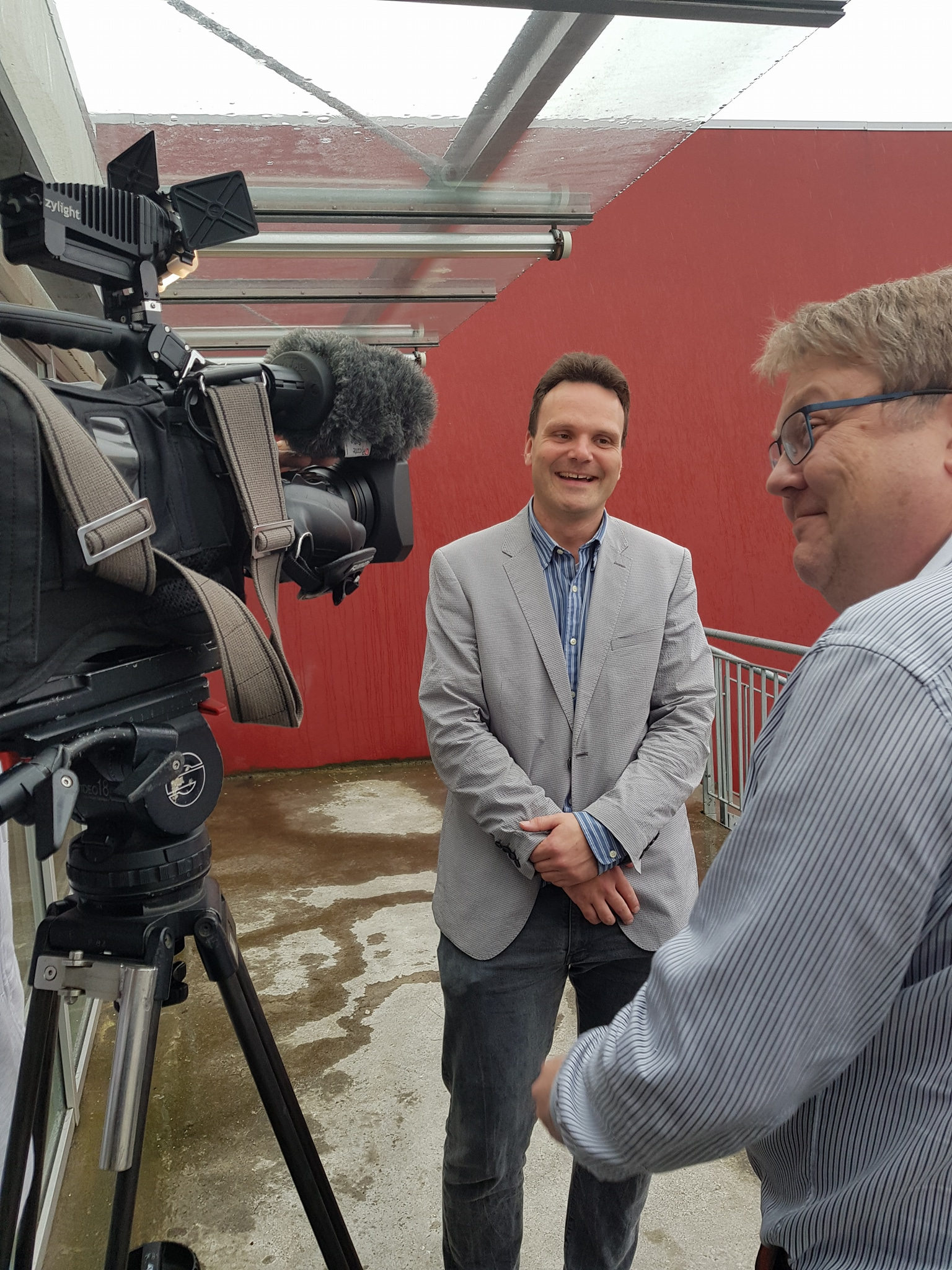
Helgi, Icelandic Chess Champion in 2018 with Gunnar Björnsson, president of the Icelandic Chess Federation, picture taken by Björn Ívar Karlsson, 06-09-2018

The 2018 Icelandic Chess Championship was in fact a 10-round open international tournament, Icelandic Open (Hermann Gunnarsson Memorial), held in Reykjavik 1–9 June 2018. Helgi took one bye in the tournament but registered 7 wins and 2 draws of his remaining 9 games, winning the event with 8½ points out of 10. As a champion of the country in open section, Helgi accepted the opportunity to play for the Icelandic national team at the chess Olympiad, held in Batumi Georgia, 23 September – 6 October 2018.

Helgi continued his chess activities after the Batumi Olympiad, for example he shared first place in the Pomar Memorial Open, held in Palma de Mallorca 26 November – 2 December 2018. In latter part of 2019 Helgi played a lot of chess. Despite COVID-19 pandemic, Helgi's comeback to chess continued in 2020, for instance he shared second place in the Icelandic Chess Championship and became the Champion of Chess Club of Reykjavík for the third time, his previous titles being from 1991 and 1992.

At the European Individual Championship, held in Reykjavik 26 August – 5 September 2021, Helgi got 7 points out of 11 and ended in 35th place in a very strong field of players. Subsequently, Helgi played for the national team in the European team championship, held in Terme Catez in Slovenia, 11–21 November 2021. Helgi continued to play for the national team, playing in the Chess Olympiad, held in Chennai, India 28 July – 9 August 2022. At the Icelandic Blitz Championship in December 2022, Helgi won the title for the third time, his previous titles being from 2004 and 2006.

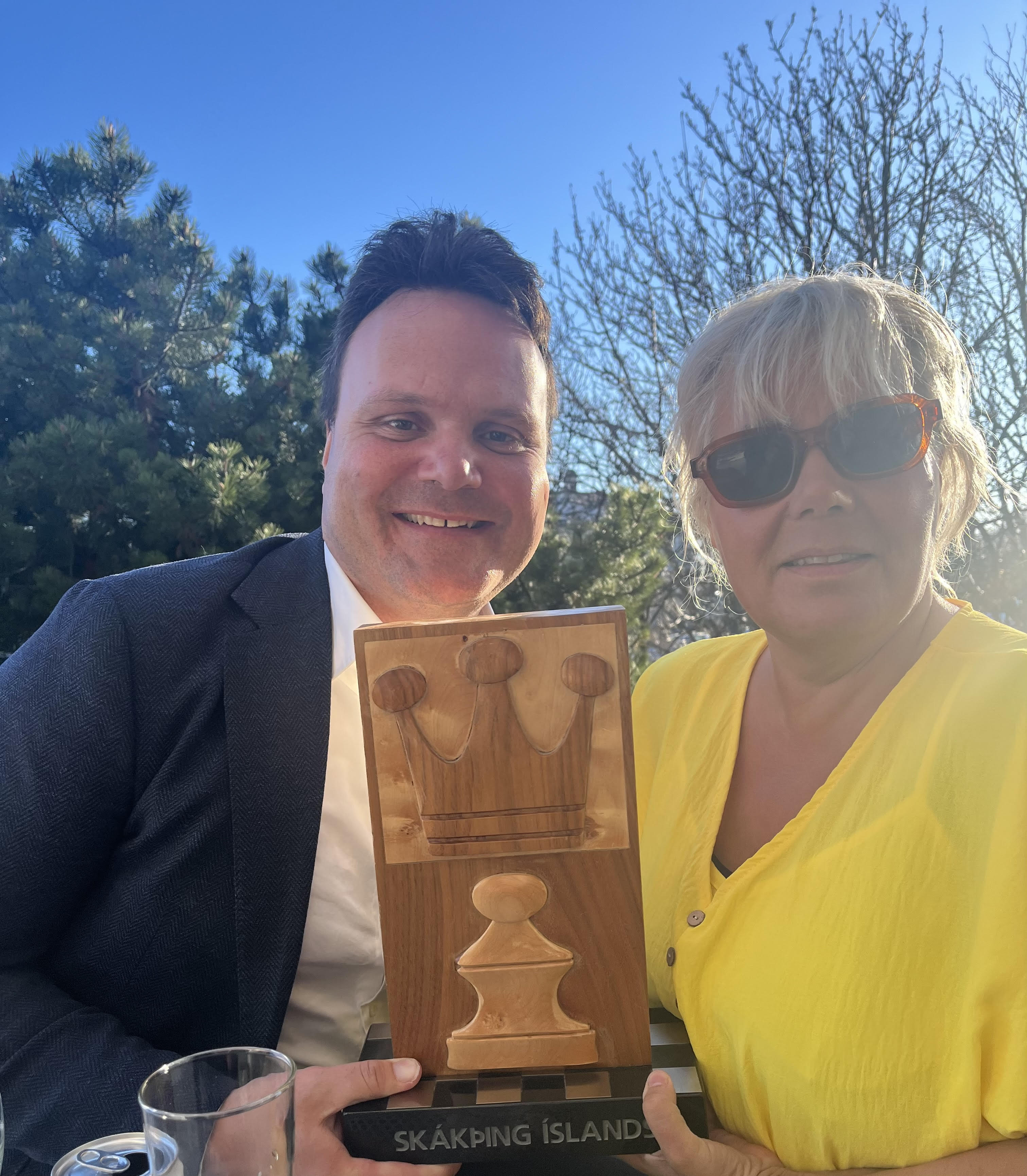
Helgi, Icelandic Chess Champion 2024, with his wife, Ólöf Vala Ingvarsdóttir, picture taken 04-27-2024

In 2023 Helgi played in total 31 games with classical time controls, scoring 22 points and by doing so he gained 26 elo points in 2023, moving his FIDE rating to 2477 by the end of the year. In April 2024 Helgi won the Icelandic Championship but he got 9 points out of 11, while the player in second place got 7 1/2 points.
