= Throstur Thorhallsson =

Icelandic chess grandmaster (born 1969)

Thröstur Thórhallsson
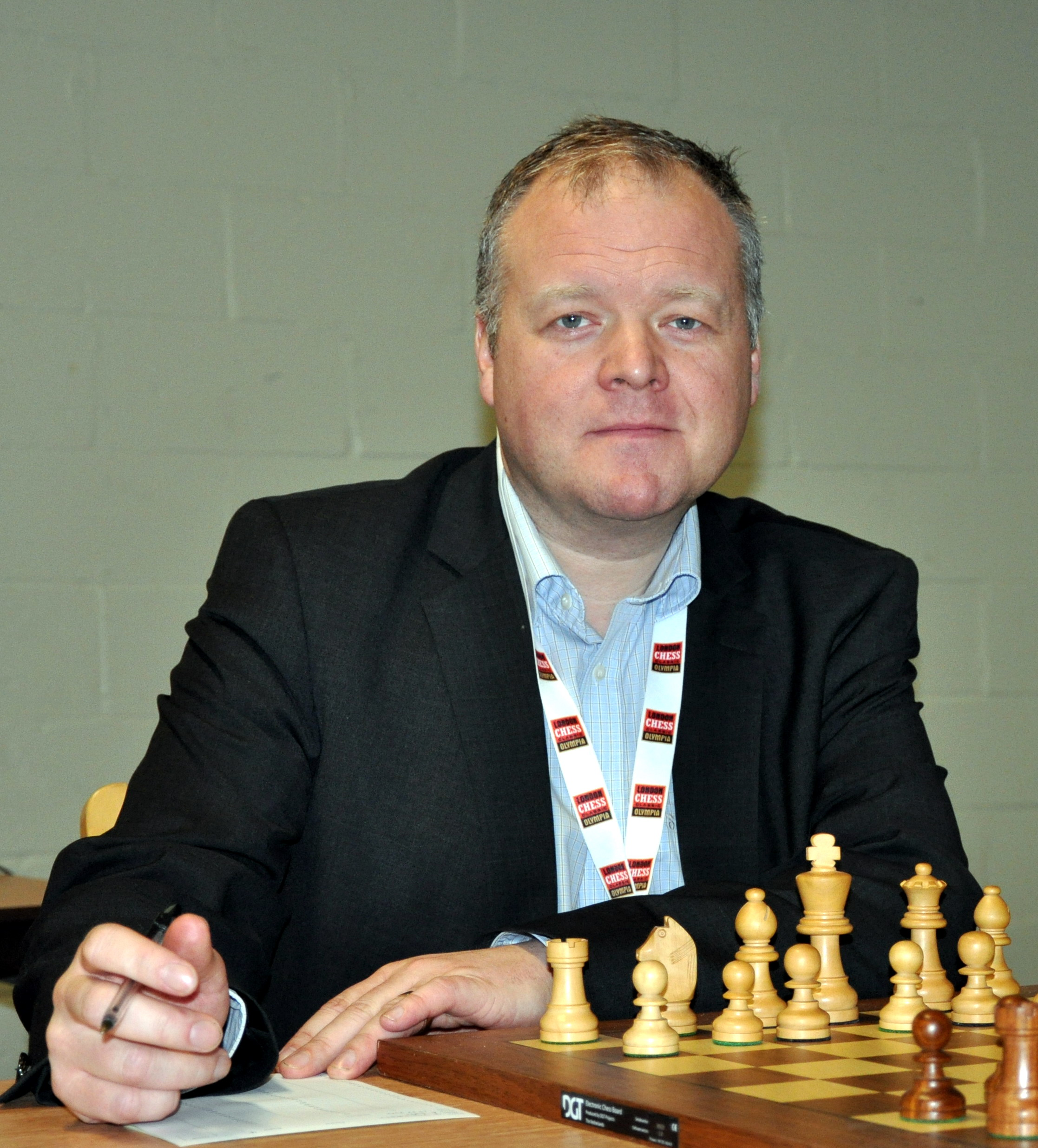
- Thröstur Thórhallsson, London 2010

Personal information
- Born: 19 March 1969 (age 57) Reykjavík, Iceland

Chess career
- Country: Iceland
- Title: Grandmaster (1996)
- Peak rating: 2510 (July 1997)

Þröstur Þórhallsson (born 19 March 1969), sometimes anglicized as Thröstur Thórhallsson, is an Icelandic chess grandmaster. He was Icelandic Chess Champion in 2012.

== Chess career ==
Born in 1969, Þröstur obtained the international master title in 1987, followed by the grandmaster title in 1996. His peak rating is 2510, achieved in July 1997. He won the Icelandic Chess Championship in 2012. He is the No. 9 ranked Icelandic player as of September 2020.
