= Jón Loftur Árnason =

Icelandic chess grandmaster (born 1960)

Personal information
- Born: 13 November 1960 (age 65) Reykjavík, Iceland

Chess career
- Country: Iceland
- Title: Grandmaster (1986)
- FIDE rating: 2404 (July 2026)
- Peak rating: 2555 (July 1987)
- Peak ranking: No. 42 (July 1987)

Jón Loftur Árnason (born 13 November 1960) is an Icelandic chess grandmaster. He is a three-time Icelandic Chess Champion and was World U17 Chess Champion in 1977.

== Chess career ==
Like fellow Scandinavians Simen Agdestein and Magnus Carlsen, Jón in his youth was hailed as a potential world champion after a string of promising results. In 1976, aged 15, he finished equal first in an event for players under 21. The same year, he won an Icelandic open tournament with the score of 9.5/11. Just a year later, playing in a telex match for Iceland against England, he drew as Black against Jonathan Mestel, an established master. Also in 1977, at Cagnes-sur-Mer, he won the World Under-17 Championship (ahead of other distinguished young talents, including Garry Kasparov), before becoming Icelandic champion on the first of three occasions (1977, 1982 and 1988). Shortly thereafter, he accepted an invitation to join the Botvinnik chess school in the Soviet Union. In 1979, FIDE awarded him the title of International Master.

In international competition, he competed first at Husavik 1985, Plovdiv 1986 and Helsinki 1986 (shared). In 1986, FIDE awarded him the International Grandmaster title.

In individual encounters with some of the world's best players, he showed that he was a strong player. He defeated world championship contenders and super-grandmasters of the calibre of Short, Korchnoi, Shirov, Adams, Dreev, Vaganian and Larsen. He has also drawn former world champions Petrosian, Smyslov, Tal, Karpov, and Khalifman.

Representing his nation's Chess Olympiad team between 1978 and 1994, he helped Iceland to 5th and 6th-place finishes in 1986 and 1992, respectively.

== Personal life ==
Jón Loftur Árnason has been less active since 1995, in order to concentrate on his other passion, business and finance. He obtained a degree in Finance and Accounting from the University of Iceland and embarked on a career that took him to Icelandic firm Oz Communications Inc., where he was appointed Secretary and Treasurer. Perhaps due to his elevated position, the company showed an affinity with chess and in 2000, sponsored the prestigious rapid chess@iceland tournament, won by Kasparov ahead of Anand. Jón took part, but was by then short of top class practice and finished in last place. Since then, he has played chess only in a minor capacity, mainly in local team tournaments.

== Notable games ==
- Viktor Korchnoi vs Jon Loftur Arnason, Reykjavik, CBM 02 1987, English Opening: King's English Variation, General (A20), 0-1
- Jon Loftur Arnason vs John Nunn, Novi Sad (ol) 1990, Spanish Game: Closed Variations (C84), 1-0
- Jon Loftur Arnason vs Alexey Dreev, Reykjavik op 1990, French Defense: Tarrasch Variation. Modern System (C03), 1-0
