= Jóhann Hjartarson =

Icelandic chess grandmaster (born 1963)

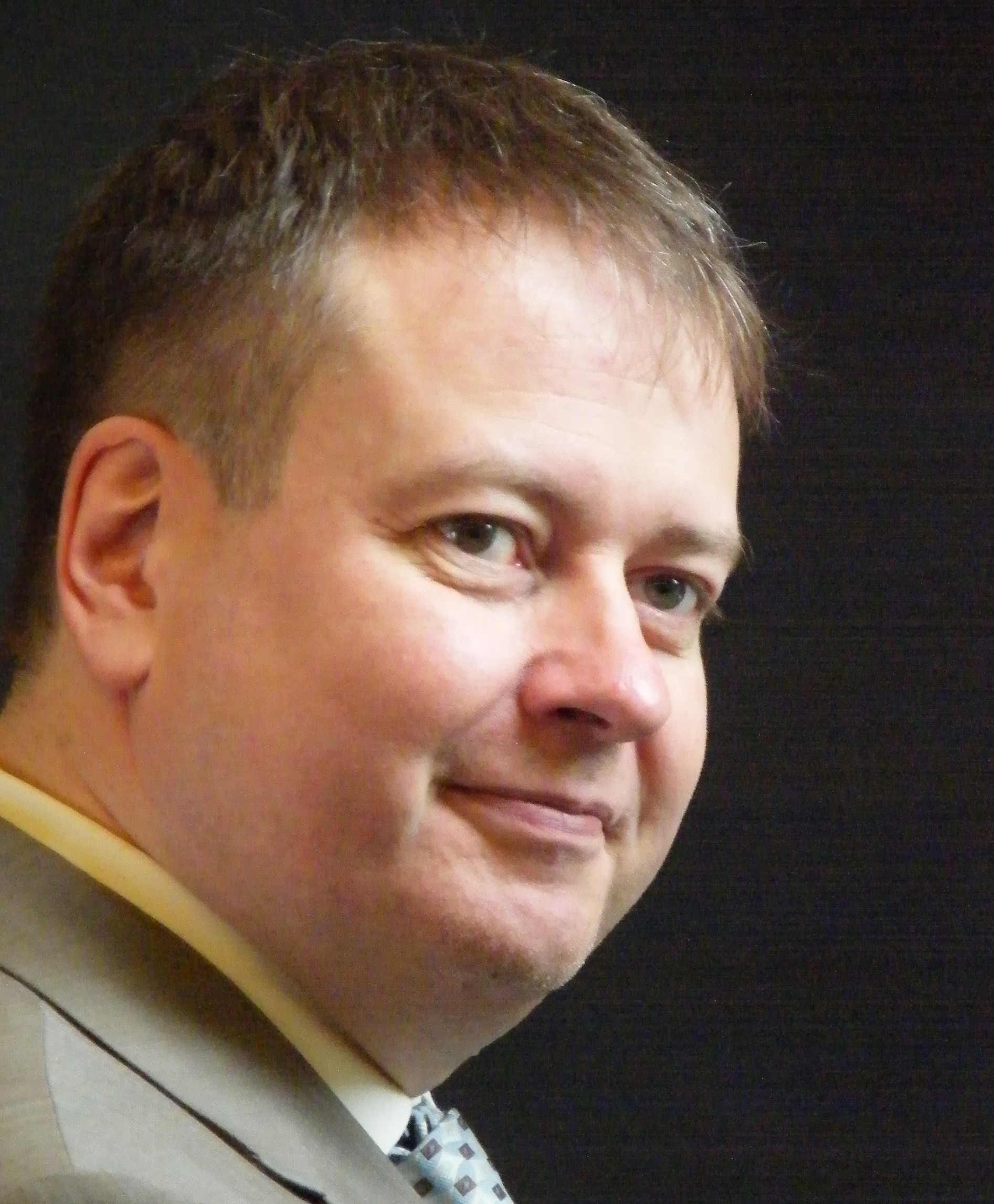
- Jóhann Hjartarson in Berlin, 2010

Personal information
- Born: 8 February 1963 (age 63) Reykjavík, Iceland

Chess career
- Country: Iceland
- Title: Grandmaster (1985)
- FIDE rating: 2457 (November 2026)
- Peak rating: 2640 (July 2003)
- Peak ranking: No. 11 (January 1989)

Jóhann Hjartarson (born 8 February 1963) is an Icelandic chess grandmaster and lawyer. He is a six-time Icelandic Chess Champion and a two-time Nordic Chess Champion. With occasional brief interruptions, he was the highest-rated Icelandic player from January 1989 to March 2015.

Since 1998, Johann has been the general counsel and secretary of the Icelandic biotechnology company deCODE genetics, a subsidiary of Amgen. Although he retired from professional chess when he began his legal career in the late 1990s, Johann still competes occasionally and remains one of the strongest chess players in Iceland.

== Chess career ==
Jóhann earned the International Master title in 1984 and the Grandmaster title a year later. Among his best international tournament results are shared first place at Reykjavík in 1984 and 1992; shared first at the World Open 1991 in Philadelphia; equal third at Tilburg 1988 (+3−3=8); and sixth at Belgrade 1989 (+2−2=7). In 1987 he finished equal first at the Interzonal tournament in Szirák, Hungary and qualified for the World Championship Candidates Tournament in 1988. He defeated Viktor Korchnoi but lost to Anatoly Karpov in the quarterfinals. Jóhann competed in the FIDE world championship held with the knock-out format in 1998 and 2004.

Jóhann won the Icelandic Chess Championship in 1980, 1984, 1994, 1995, 1997 and 2016. He won the Nordic Chess Championship in 1997 and again twenty years later in 2017. With this latter win (in which he edged out Nils Grandelius on tiebreak score), Jóhann qualified to play in the FIDE World Cup 2017. He was eliminated in the first round by David Navara.

Jóhann has played for Iceland in the Chess Olympiad, World Team Chess Championship, European Team Chess Championship, World Senior Team Championships, World U26 Team Championship, World U16 Team Championship, Telechess Olympiad and Nordic Chess Cup. Playing at the European Chess Club Cup, he won the gold medal with German team Bayern Munich in 1992.
