= Hannes Stefánsson =

Icelandic chess grandmaster (born 1972)

Hannes Stefansson
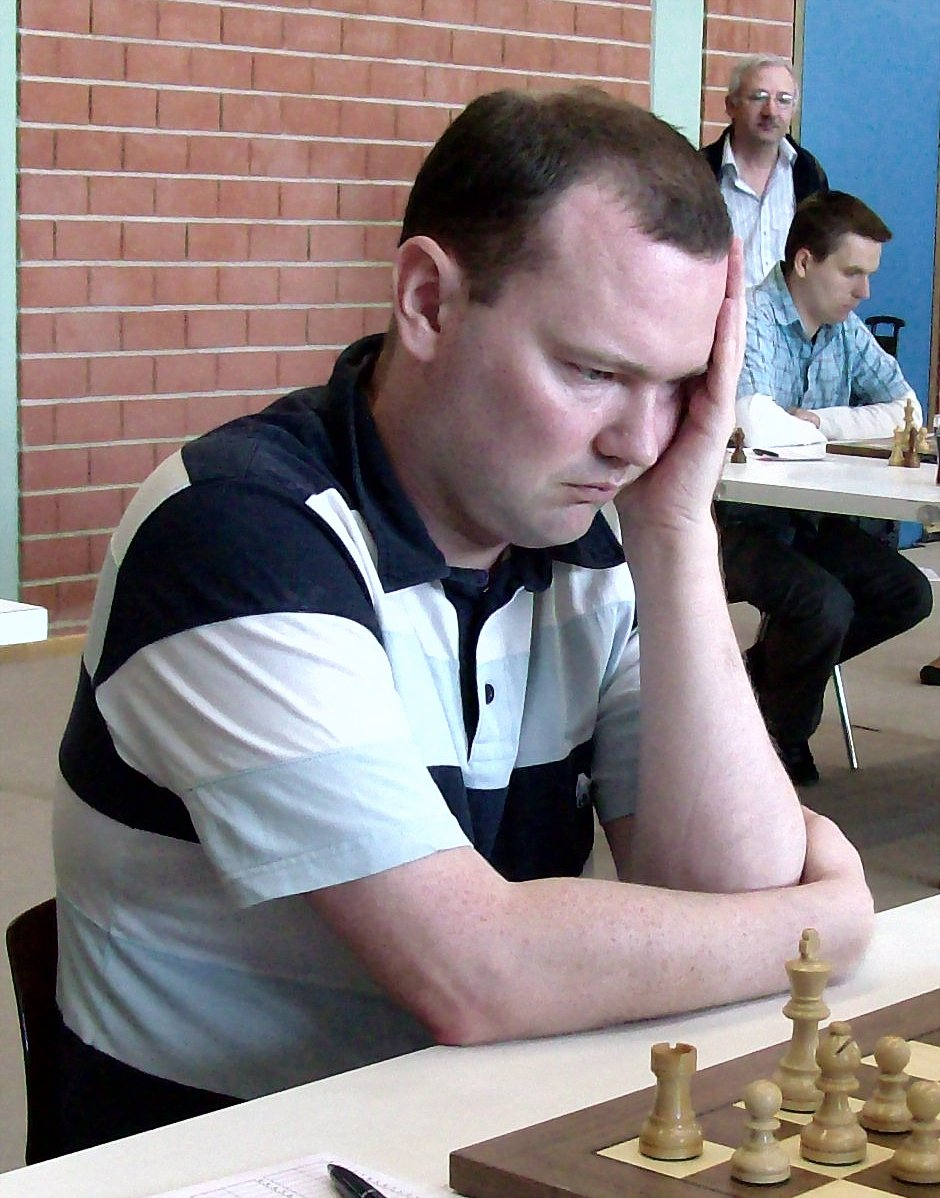
- Hannes Stefansson, 2008

Personal information
- Born: Hannes Hlífar Stefánsson; 18 July 1972 (age 53) Reykjavík, Iceland

Chess career
- Country: Iceland
- Title: Grandmaster (1993)
- FIDE rating: 2419 (July 2026)
- Peak rating: 2604 (January 2002)
- Peak ranking: No. 83 (January 2002)

Hannes Hlífar Stefánsson (born 18 July 1972) is an Icelandic chess grandmaster. He has won the Icelandic Chess Championship a record thirteen times.

== Chess career ==
Born in 1972, Hannes won the World U16 Chess Championship in 1987. He won the Acropolis International in 1993. He tied for first to third in the Reykjavik Open in 1994, together with Pigusov and Zvjagintsev and tied for 1st–4th with Hedinn Steingrimsson, Yuriy Kryvoruchko and Mihail Marin in the Reykjavik Open tournament 2009. He won the International chess tournament Open Teplice 2015 in the Czech Republic. He is the No. 1 ranked Icelandic player as of September 2023.
