= Friðrik Ólafsson =

Icelandic chess grandmaster and official (1935–2025)

- Friðrik in 1976

Personal information
- Born: 26 January 1935 Reykjavík, Iceland
- Died: 4 April 2025 (aged 90) Reykjavík, Iceland

Chess career
- Country: Iceland
- Title: Grandmaster (1958)
- Years active: 1946 to 2018
- Peak rating: 2570 (July 1971)

President of FIDE
- In office 1978–1982
- Preceded by: Max Euwe
- Succeeded by: Florencio Campomanes

Friðrik Ólafsson (26 January 1935 – 4 April 2025) was an Icelandic chess grandmaster. He was president of FIDE from 1978 to 1982. He was an author who produced three books, two of which were co-wrote with Ingvar Ásmundsson and Freysteinn Jóhannsson. He was a six-time Icelandic Chess Champion and a two-time Nordic Chess Champion.

== Chess career ==
Friðrik was born in Reykjavík, Iceland. A first-time winner of the Icelandic Chess Championship in 1952 and of the Nordic Chess Championship a year later, he rapidly became recognised as the strongest Icelandic chess player of his generation. Friðrik's first result of international note was his shared first with Viktor Korchnoi at Hastings 1955–56.

Friðrik's first book was made in 1958 with Ingvar Ásmundsson called Lærið að tefla. Friðrik's best result in World Chess Championship competition was in the 1958 Interzonal tournament, where he finished equal 5th–6th, automatically earning the grandmaster title (the first for Iceland) and qualifying for the 1959 Candidates Tournament, the last stage to determine the challenger to the World Chess Champion in 1960. It was an amazing achievement for someone who was not a chess professional at the time. In the Candidates Tournament, however, he finished seventh of eight with 10/28. He also played in the following Interzonal in 1962, but failed to qualify for the Candidates.

Among his other best tournament results were joint third in the first Piatigorsky Cup, Los Angeles 1963, with 7½/14 and shared first with Ljubomir Ljubojević at Wijk aan Zee 1976, ahead of Mikhail Tal. Chessmetrics historical ratings ranked Friðrik at his best as #13 in the world in October 1958.

Friðrik continued to play occasionally into the 21st century, winning a rapid match against fellow veteran Bent Larsen in 2003 by a score of 5–3. According to his FIDE card, as recently as 2018, the year he turned 83, he played 6 games, winning one and drawing the remainder.

Friðrik usually played the Sicilian Defence against 1.e4 and the King's Indian Defence and Nimzo-Indian Defence against 1.d4. With White, he usually played the English Opening, but he also played 1.d4, 1.e4, and 1.Nf3 many times.

Friðrik's first book was made in 1958 with Ingvar Ásmundsson, called Lærið að tefla (lit."you all to learn chess"). Heimsmeistaraeinvígið í skák ("The World Championship Duel in Chess") was written by Friðrik and Freysteinn Jóhannsson in 1972. The book covers the 1972 World Chess Championship, the 21-game championship match between American Bobby Fischer and Soviet champion Boris Spassky. Við skákborðið í aldarfjórðung: 50 valdar sóknarskákir ("At the Chess Table for a Quarter of a Century") is a 1976 book that was written solely by Friðrik, which features 50 of his personal best attacking games from the first 25 years of his chess career.

== FIDE president ==
In 1978, Friðrik succeeded Max Euwe as president of the international chess governing body FIDE. During the tenure he presided over the 1981 Karpov–Korchnoi World Championship match. Since Korchnoi defected from the Soviet Union in 1976, the Soviets were holding Korchnoi's son, Igor. Friðrik delayed the planned 19 September start date of the match in a bid to get the Soviets to release Korchnoi's son. For this attempt, Friðrik drew the wrath of the Soviets, who then backed the FIDE vice-president, Florencio Campomanes, for the presidency of FIDE. Campomanes succeeded Friðrik as FIDE president in 1982.

== Personal life and death ==
In life outside of chess, Friðrik was married and had two adult daughters.

Prior to 1974, when he became a chess professional, he worked as a lawyer at the Icelandic Ministry of Justice. After the FIDE presidency in 1982, Friðrik was appointed secretary to the Icelandic Parliament.

Friðrik died in the palliative care unit of the National University Hospital, on 4 April 2025, at the age of 90.

== Sources ==
- Chess magazine, January 1979 – Interview with David Levy
- The KGB Plays Chess – Yuri Felshtinsky
