= 2008 in chess =

Below is a list of events in chess during the year 2008, and a list of the top ten players during that year:

== Events ==
(Top events in bold)

=== January ===
FIDE January 2008 Top Ten
| Rank | Prev | Player | Rating | Chng |
|---|---|---|---|---|
| 1 | 3 | Vladimir Kramnik (RUS) | 2799 | +14 |
| 2 | 1 | Viswanathan Anand (IND) | 2799 | –2 |
| 3 | 4 | Veselin Topalov (BUL) | 2780 | +11 |
| 4 | 6 | Alexander Morozevich (RUS) | 2765 | +10 |
| 5 | 12 | Peter Svidler (RUS) | 2763 | +31 |
| 6 | 7 | Shakhriyar Mamedyarov (AZE) | 2760 | +8 |
| 7 | 10 | Alexei Shirov (ESP) | 2755 | +16 |
| 8 | 5 | Peter Leko (HUN) | 2753 | −2 |
| 9 | 2 | Vassily Ivanchuk (UKR) | 2753 | −36 |
| 10 | 9 | Levon Aronian (ARM) | 2739 | −2 |

- **January 1** – Vladimir Kramnik (Russia) gained 14 rating points to move from number three to number one on the FIDE top 100 players list, at 2799. Viswanathan Anand (India), also at 2799, dropped from first to second as he had not played enough rated games in the previous reporting period. Veselin Topalov (Bulgaria) was third at 2780. Vassily Ivanchuk (Ukraine) lost 36 points to drop from number two to number nine. As on the previous list, a rating of 2627 was required to place in the top 100.
- **January 6** – 83rd Hastings International Congress ends in three-way tie between GM Vadim Malakhatko (Belgium), GM Nidjat Mamedov (Azerbaijan), and GM Valeriy Neverov (Ukraine). Earlier in the tournament, IM Simon Williams (England) achieved a performance that qualified him for the Grandmaster title (rating temporarily over 2500, he already had the required norms).
- January 6 – 50th Reggio Emilia won by GM Zoltán Almási (Hungary).
- January 7 – 2nd ACP World Rapid Cup in Odesa won by GM Teimour Radjabov (Azerbaijan) over GM Alexander Grischuk (Russia) in a blitz playoff.
- January 9 – Asian Team Championships in Visakhapatnam men's and women's gold medal won by China, with India winning silver and Vietnam bronze in both events.
- January 11 – 2007/8 Australian Championship in Parramatta won by IM Stephen Solomon placing second (top finisher among Australians). GM Dejan Antic (Serbia) won the tournament.
- January 12 – 33rd Ciudad de Sevilla won by GM Karen Movsziszian (Armenia).
- January 13 – 5th Estonia–Finland match on 100 boards in Tallinn won by Estonia 60.5–28.5. (Finland was short of players, and only 89 games were played.)
- January 19 – Venezuelan Championship in San Felipe won by IM Eduardo Iturrizaga 10/11. This is IM Eduardo Iturrizaga's third consecutive championship title. WIM Maria Ubaldo won the women's championship for the second year in a row, 6.5/9.
- January 21 – 68th Armenian Championship in Yerevan won for the third time and the second consecutive year by GM Karen Asrian on tie-break over six-time champion GM Artashes Minasian. Both scored 8/12 in a field of 13 with 11 GMs. WIM Lilit Galojan is the 62nd women's champion on tie-break over WIM Siranush Andriasian.
- January 22 – Belarus Championship in Minsk won by GM Alexei Fedorov with 9.5/13.
- January 24 – Viswanathan Anand named CNN-IBN's Indian Sportsperson of 2007 in recognition of his 20-year career and 2007 World Championship title.
- January 25 – 115th New Zealand Championship in Auckland won by GM Murray Chandler with 9/11.
- **January 27** – Corus 2008 (Wijk aan Zee) A-group (category 20) won by GM Levon Aronian (Armenia) and GM Magnus Carlsen (Norway), tied at 8/13. This is the second time that the 25-year-old Aronian shared first place at this tournament. Carlsen is only 17 years old.
- January 28 – Azerbaijan Championship in Baku won by GM Rauf Mamedov with 7/9.
- January 29 – Croatian Championship in Split won by GM Hrvoje Stevic with 8/12.
- January 31 – 6th Gibraltar Gibtelecom Chess Festival won by GM Hikaru Nakamura (USA) in a 2–0 playoff against GM Bu Xiangzhi (China) after both finished with 8/10. IM Zhao Zong-Yuan became Australia's youngest ever GM at age 21 by scoring 6 in the first 9 rounds on the way to 6.5/10.
- Cuban Chess Championship won by Yuniesky Quesada.

=== February ===
- February 2 – "To Gligorić with Love", a rapid chess tournament in Pančevo honors Svetozar Gligorić (Serbia) on his 85th birthday. The 85 player field includes 23 GMs, 21 IMs, 12 FMs, 4 WGMs, and 1 WIM. Five players tie for first place, with GM Ivan Ivanišević (Serbia) winning the trophy.
- February 10 – 4th International Chess Festival Moscow Open held at the Russian State Social University won by GM Artyom Timofeev 7.5/9, overtaking the tournament leader GM Ernesto Inarkiev (7/9) by beating him in the final round in a 117-move game. IM Anna Muzychuk wins the women's section with 8/9. The tournament has a 5 million ruble prize fund (about US$205,760).
- February 15 – 45th Indian Championship in Chennai won by GM Surya Shekhar Ganguly on tie-break over IM K Rathnakaran after both scored 9/11.
- February 16 – British Chess Solving Championship has a field of 33, including all title British solvers and two overseas guests. Former world solving champion Piotr Murdzia scores 59/65 to lead the field by 7 1/2 points. Dolf Wissmann (Netherlands) and Jonathan Mestel share second place with 51 1/2, a half-point ahead of John Nunn, alone in fourth. Mestel wins his 15th championship as the highest British scorer.
- February 17 – Four Nations Chess Challenge in Oslo won by Sweden. England finishes second, followed by Latvia and Norway.
- February 19 – European Senior Team Championship in Dresden won by the Czech Republic team headed by Vlastimil Jansa.
- February 22 – Aeroflot Open in Moscow won by 17-year-old GM Ian Nepomniachtchi (Russia) with the score 7/9. Regarded as the strongest open tournament in the world, the prize fund is US$200,000 with $30,000 for the winner.
- February 23 – 79th German Championship in Bad Woerishofen won by GM Daniel Fridman.
- February 24 – 60th Polish Women's Championship in Kraków won by IM Monika Soćko.

=== March ===
- March 1 – Icelandic Team Championship won by Taflfélag Reykjavikur over Hellir A. Taflfélag Reykjavikur included six GMs and 3 IMs. The World Junior Champion Ahmed Adly (Egypt) achieved the top board one performance, playing for Hellir A and scoring 3/3 (100%) with a performance rating of 3017.
- **March 7** – Morelia/Linares won by Viswanathan Anand (India) scoring 8 1/2/14, a half-point ahead of Magnus Carlsen (Norway).
- March 2 – Romanian Championship in Cluj-Napoca won by GM Vladislav Nevednichy on tie-break with five players at 7/9.
- March 8 – 126th Varsity Match between the Cambridge University Chess Club and the Oxford University Chess Club held in London. The match is drawn 4–4, leaving Cambridge in the all-time series lead with 56 wins to Oxford's 49, with 14 drawn matches.
- March 9 – 65th Polish Chess Championship in Lublin won by GM Bartosz Soćko with 9/13.
- March 9 – Finnish Team Championship won by Matinkylä for the first time since 1993, after placing second four consecutive times.
- March 12 – 65th Georgian Women's Championship in Tbilisi won by IM Nana Dzagnidze over WGM Salome Melia in a rapid playoff after both finished with 9/12.
- March 18 – Russian U-20 Championship in Saint Petersburg
- March 20 – Atatürk International Women's Masters in Istanbul won by 14-year-old WGM Hou Yifan (China) scoring 7/9 to finish a full point ahead of GM Pia Cramling (Sweden).
- March 24 – 72nd Bulgarian Men's Championship in Plovdiv won by GM Vasil Spasov scoring 9½/13. WFM Elitsa Raeva wins the 57th Women's Championship also in Plovdiv, scoring 9/11.
- March 24 – Danish Championship in Silkeborg won by GM Peter Heine Nielsen who scored 7/9 in his first appearance in the championship in five years.
- March 24 – Doeberl Cup Premier in Canberra won by GM Varuzhan Akobian (USA) scoring 7 1/2/9.
- March 24 – Welsh Championship in Cardiff won jointly by IM Leighton Williams and FM James Cobb scoring 6/7.
- March 27 – Iranian Championship won by GM Ehsan Ghaem Maghami scoring 12/13. Although Iran has five GMs he was the only GM in the event as the others declined to play due to lack of a cash prize. WIM Atousa Pourkashiyan wins the Women's Championship scoring 8 1/2/11 to top a twelve-player field including one WGM, two WIMs, and four WFMs.
- March 28 – Amber Rapid and Blindfold in Nice won by GM Levon Aronian. The blindfold section was a three-way tie, with Aronian, GM Vladimir Kramnik, and GM Alexander Morozevich all scoring 6/11. Aronian won the rapid section with 7 1/2/11, 2 points ahead of four players tied for second. The prize fund is €216,000 (approximately US$336,000).
- March 28 – Serbian Championship in Mataruška won by GM Ivan Ivanišević scoring 9/13.
- March 30 – 67th Georgian Championship won by GM Levan Pantsulaia by beating IM Giorgi Margvelashvili in the final. The championship is a knockout event with rapid playoff tie-break. Marvelashvili earned a GM norm.

=== April ===
FIDE April 2008 Top Ten
| Rank | Prev | Player | Rating | Chng |
|---|---|---|---|---|
| 1 | 2 | Viswanathan Anand (IND) | 2803 | +4 |
| 2 | 1 | Vladimir Kramnik (RUS) | 2788 | −11 |
| 3 | 4 | Alexander Morozevich (RUS) | 2774 | +9 |
| 4 | 3 | Veselin Topalov (BUL) | 2767 | −13 |
| 5 | 13 | Magnus Carlsen (NOR) | 2765 | +32 |
| 6 | 10 | Levon Aronian (ARM) | 2763 | +24 |
| 7 | 6 | Shakhriyar Mamedyarov (AZE) | 2752 | −8 |
| 8 | 12 | Teimour Radjabov (AZE) | 2751 | +16 |
| 9 | 5 | Peter Svidler (RUS) | 2746 | −17 |
| 10 | 8 | Peter Leko (HUN) | 2741 | −12 |

- **April 1** – Viswanathan Anand (India) regains the top spot on the FIDE ratings list as Vladimir Kramnik (Russia) falls to second place. Seventeen-year-old Magnus Carlsen (Norway) enters the top ten for the first time, jumping eight spots to move to fifth, just 38 rating points below first. Sergey Karjakin (Ukraine) is the next highest rated junior, 13th overall with a 2732 rating. Judit Polgár (Hungary) is the only woman in the top one hundred, with her 2709 rating earning 22nd place. Humpy Koneru (India) is the second ranked woman rated over a hundred points lower at 2603. Hou Yifan (China) moves up one position to fourth on the women's list at age fourteen years and one month. Antoaneta Stefanova (Bulgaria) makes the largest jump on the women's list, gaining 74 rating points to climb from 24th up to 6th.
- April 1 – Chess Informant publishes its one-hundredth issue.
- April 4 – Turkish Championship in Ankara won by GM Mikhail Gurevich scoring 11 1/2/13, a half-point ahead of GM Suat Atalık.
- April 5 – 9th Internet Tournament Ciudad de Dos Hermanas won by defending champion Jorge Sammour-Hasbun, scoring 15/17. Twenty-five-year-old Sammour-Hasbun (Zamora) is the former World Under-10 Champion but has no FIDE title. Held on the Internet Chess Club, this event is the largest and most important internet chess tournament. Total prize fund is €7700, with €2000 for the winner.
- April 9 – Serbian Women's Championship in Kać won by WGM Andjelija Stojanovic scoring 8 1/2/11.
- April 13 – Dutch Championship in Hilversum is twelve-player round-robin tournament with an average rating of 2536 (Category XII). Twenty-one-year-old GM Daniël Stellwagen had a half-point lead with 7/10 going into the final round, but loses to 23-year-old GM Jan Smeets in the decisive game, giving Smeets the final score 7 1/2/11 for the half-point win and €10,000. Peng Zhaoqin scores 8 1/2/9 to win the Dutch Women's Championship in Hilversum by 1 1/2 points. This is Zhaoqin's ninth consecutive women's championship and her tenth overall.
- April 13 – 2nd Ruy Lopez Masters in Mérida won by GM Michael Adams (England) scoring 5 1/2/7 to finish a half-point ahead of Zhang Pengxiang. The tournament was an eight player round-robin with an average rating of 2616 (FIDE category 15).
- April 14 – Russian Team Championships in Sochi won by Ural Yekaterinburg. Composed of GMs Teimour Radjabov (2751), Alexei Shirov (2755), Gata Kamsky (2732), Alexander Grischuk (2711), Vladimir Malakhov (2689), Vladimir Akopian (2700), Alexey Dreev (2633), and Alexander Motylev (2644), it is the only team with an average rating over 2700. The Women's Team Championship is won by Finec Saint Petersburg, composed of Ekaterina Korbut, Viktorija Čmilytė, Natalia Zhukova, Julia Demina, and Irina Turova.
- April 14 – 10th Dubai Open won by 14-year-old GM Wesley So (Philippines), the world's youngest GM, on tie-break over GMs Merab Gagunashvili (Georgia), Ehsan Ghaem Maghami (Iran) and Li Chao (China), all with 7/9. A player from Iran is expelled from the tournament over accusations of cheating by receiving moves on a mobile phone sent by an accomplice using a chess computer.
- April 20 – 2007/8 Chess Bundesliga
- April 20 – 14th Ciudad de Dos Hermanas Rapid won by GM Veselin Topalov (Bulgaria), defeating GM Francisco Vallejo Pons (Spain) 2 1/2–1 1/2 in the final match by winning the first game and drawing the rest. The first round matches of the four-player knockout rapid chess tournament were won by Topalov over GM Judit Polgár (Hungary) 2 1/2–1 1/2 and Vallejo over GM Alexei Shirov (Spain) 3–1.

=== May ===
- May 4 – 9th European Chess Championship in Plovdiv
- May 6 – FIDE Grand Prix in Baku, the first event in the FIDE Grand Prix 2008–2009
- May 17 – Dutch Team Championship
- **May 18** – M-Tel Masters in Sofia

=== August ===
- August 9 – 95th British Championship in Liverpool
- August 17 – 8th European Individual Senior Championship in Davos.
- August 28 Start of Women's World Chess Championship 2008

=== October ===
- **October 3 to 18** – First World Mind Sports Games held in Beijing, China
- **October 14** – Start of Anand–Kramnik 2008 World Championship match in Bonn
- **October 29** – Anand draws the eleventh game of his match with Kramnik to retain the World Championship title by the score 6 1/2–4 1/2 (+3−1=7).

== Titles awarded ==
=== Grandmaster ===
In 2008 FIDE awarded the title Grandmaster to the following players:

- Yuriy Ajrapetjan (b. 1988) Ukraine
- Ralf Appel (b. 1971) Germany
- Axel Bachmann (b. 1989) Paraguay
- Vinay Bhat (b. 1984) United States
- Dmitry Chuprov (b. 1978) Russia
- Andrey Deviatkin (b. 1980) Russia
- Anton Filippov (b. 1986) Uzbekistan
- Avetik Grigoryan (b. 1989) Armenia
- Stewart Haslinger (b. 1981) England
- Frank Holzke (b. 1971) Germany
- Enamul Hossain (b. 1981) Bangladesh
- Valentin Iotov (b. 1988) Bulgaria
- Eduardo Iturrizaga (b. 1989) Venezuela
- Miguel Llanes Hurtado (b. 1978) Spain
- Konstantin Maslak (b. 1984) Russia
- Jakob Meister (b. 1955) Germany
- Oleg Nikolenko (b. 1959) Russia
- Tomas Petrik (b. 1980) Slovakia
- Markus Ragger (b. 1988) Austria
- Eltaj Safarli (b. 1992) Azerbaijan
- Ivan Salgado Lopez (b. 1991) Spain
- Vigen Mirumian (b. 1977) Czech Republic
- Marie Sebag (b. 1986) France
- Dmitriy Skorchenko (b. 1983) Russia
- Sergey Vokarev (b. 1970) Russia
- Yuri Vovk (b. 1988) Ukraine
- Wen Yang (b. 1988) China
- Simon Williams (b. 1979) England
- Zhao Zong-Yuan (b. 1986) Australia

=== Woman Grandmaster ===
In 2008 FIDE awarded the title Woman Grandmaster to the following players:

- Nino Batsiashvili (b. 1987) Georgia
- Elizaveta Borisova (b. 1984) Russia
- Tatiana Fatianova (b. 1984) Russia
- Mary Ann Gomes (b. 1989) India
- Huang Qian (b. 1986) China
- Monika Krupa (b. 1977) Poland
- Eva Kulovana (b. 1987) Czech Republic
- Thanh Tu Le (b. 1985) Vietnam
- Kateřina Němcová (b. 1990) Czech Republic
- Anna Rudolf (b. 1978) Hungary

== Deaths ==
- January 17 – Bobby Fischer, 64, the 11th World Champion, dies in Iceland.
- May 24 – Bukhuti Gurgenidze, 74, Georgian GM and many time Georgian Champion.
- June 9 – Karen Asrian, 28, Armenian GM, three times Armenian Chess Champion, dies of a suspected heart attack in Yerevan.
- August 10 – Igor Zakharevich, 25, Russian GM.
- August 20 – Mario Bertok, 78, Croatian IM dies in a swimming accident in Jarun Lake, Zagreb.
- August 20/21 – Vladimir Bukal, 68, Croatian IM dies overnight in Zagreb. Bukal won the 2002 European Senior Championship.
- November 29 – Robert Wade, 87, winner of multiple New Zealand and British chess championships, IM and International Arbiter, dies in London of pneumonia.
- December 10 – Mark Diesen, 51, American IM and 1976 World Junior Champion.
- December 20 – Albin Planinc, 64, Yugoslav/Slovenian GM.
- December 24 – Hugh Myers, 78, American master and writer on unorthodox openings, dies in Davenport, Iowa.
