= Chigorin Memorial =

Annual chess tournament in Russia

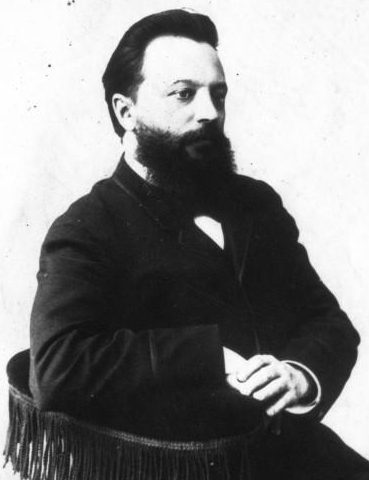
Mikhail Chigorin shortly before his death in 1908

The Chigorin Memorial is a chess tournament played in honour of Mikhail Chigorin (1850–1908), founder of the Soviet Chess School and one of the leading players of his day. The first and most important edition was the one played in 1909 in St. Petersburg. Later on, an international invitation Memorial tournament series was established, and mainly played in the Black Sea resort Sochi (from 1963 to 1990). Further irregular tournaments had been held in 1947, 1951, 1961, and 1972, played in diverse venues. From 1993 the venue returned to his hometown. The Memorial is now played as an Open event.

== St. Petersburg 1909 ==
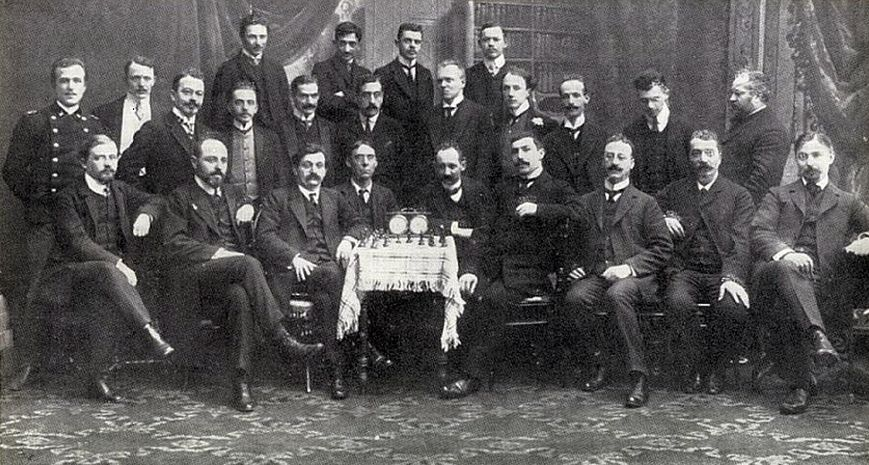
Photo from the first Chigorian Memorial Tournament, 1909

President of the organising committee was Peter Petrovich Saburov, President of the St. Petersburg Chess Club. Members of the committee were Boris Maliutin, O. Sossnitzky, V. Tschudowski, Sergius A. Znosko-Borovsky and Eugene A. Znosko-Borovsky. The main event lasted from 14 February to 12 March 1909.

N°	Name	1	2	3	4	5	6	7	8	9	0	1	2	3	4	5	6	7	8	9	Total
1	Akiba Rubinstein (Russian Empire)	*	1	1	1	½	½	½	1	1	1	½	1	0	1	½	1	1	1	1	14½
2	Emanuel Lasker (German Empire)	0	*	½	1	½	1	1	1	½	1	1	1	0	1	1	1	1	1	1	14½
3	Rudolf Spielmann (Austria-Hungary)	0	½	*	1	0	1	1	½	1	½	½	½	1	0	½	1	½	½	1	11
4	Oldřich Duras (Austria-Hungary)	0	0	0	*	0	1	½	0	½	1	0	1	1	1	1	1	1	1	1	11
5	Ossip Bernstein (Russian Empire)	½	½	1	1	*	0	1	0	1	1	1	1	½	0	0	0	½	½	1	10½
6	Richard Teichmann (German Empire)	½	0	0	0	1	*	0	½	½	½	½	1	1	½	1	½	1	1	½	10
7	Julius Perlis (Austria-Hungary)	½	0	0	½	0	1	*	½	½	1	½	1	1	½	1	½	0	0	1	9½
8	Erich Cohn (German Empire)	0	0	½	1	1	½	½	*	0	0	1	½	½	0	½	½	½	1	1	9
9	Carl Schlechter (Austria-Hungary)	0	½	0	½	0	½	½	1	*	1	0	0	1	1	½	0	1	½	1	9
10	Gersz Salwe (Russian Empire)	0	0	½	0	0	½	0	1	0	*	½	1	1	1	½	0	1	1	1	9
11	Savielly Tartakower (Austria-Hungary)	½	0	½	1	0	½	½	0	1	½	*	0	0	0	½	1	1	1	½	8½
12	Jacques Mieses (German Empire)	0	0	½	0	0	0	0	½	1	0	1	*	½	1	1	1	0	1	1	8½
13	Fyodor Duz-Khotimirsky (Russian Empire)	1	1	0	0	½	0	0	½	0	0	1	½	*	½	½	½	1	0	1	8
14	Leo Forgács (Austria-Hungary)	0	0	1	0	1	½	½	1	0	0	1	0	½	*	½	½	½	0	½	7½
15	Amos Burn (United Kingdom)	½	0	½	0	1	0	0	½	½	½	½	0	½	½	*	1	½	½	0	7
16	Milan Vidmar (Austria-Hungary)	0	0	0	0	1	½	½	½	1	1	0	0	½	½	0	*	½	1	0	7
17	Abraham Speijer (Netherlands)	0	0	½	0	½	0	1	½	0	0	0	1	0	½	½	½	*	½	½	6
18	Sergey von Freymann (Russian Empire)	0	0	½	0	½	0	1	0	½	0	0	0	1	1	½	0	½	*	0	5½
19	Eugene Znosko-Borovsky (Russian Empire)	0	0	0	0	0	½	0	0	0	0	½	0	0	½	1	1	½	1	*	5

Rubinstein and Lasker won 875 rubles (each), Spielmann and Duras 475 rubles (each), Bernstein 190 rubles, Teichmann 120 rubles, Perlis 80 rubles, Cohn, Schlechter, and Salwe 40 rubles (each).

== 1947–1972 ==
From 1947, there were several Chigorin memorial tournaments, but it was not until 1963 that it was established as an annual event in Sochi. These tournaments were all played on the round robin format.

Year	Winner	City
1947	Mikhail Botvinnik	Moscow
1951	Vasily Smyslov	Leningrad
1961	Mark Taimanov	Rostov-on-Don
1972	Lev Polugaevsky	Kislovodsk

== Sochi period (1963–1990) ==
#	Year	Winner	City
1	1963	Lev Polugaevsky	Sochi
2	1964	Nikolai Krogius	Sochi
3	1965	Wolfgang Unzicker; Boris Spassky	Sochi
4	1966	Viktor Korchnoi	Sochi
5	1967	Alexander Zaitsev; Vladimir Simagin; Nikolai Krogius; Leonid Shamkovich; Boris Spassky	Sochi
6	1973	Mikhail Tal	Sochi
7	1974	Lev Polugaevsky	Sochi
8	1976	Lev Polugaevsky; Evgeny Sveshnikov	Sochi
9	1977	Mikhail Tal	Sochi
10	1979	Nukhim Rashkovsky	Sochi
11	1980	Alexander Panchenko	Sochi
12	1981	Vitaly Tseshkovsky	Sochi
13	1982	Mikhail Tal	Sochi
14	1983	Anatoly Vaisser; Evgeny Sveshnikov	Sochi
15	1984	Georgy Agzamov	Sochi
16	1985	Evgeny Sveshnikov	Sochi
17	1986	Svetozar Gligorić; Alexander Beliavsky; Rafael Vaganian	Sochi
18	1987	Sergey Smagin; Evgeny Pigusov; Andrei Kharitonov	Sochi
19	1988	Sergey Dolmatov	Sochi
20	1989	Alexey Vyzmanavin	Sochi
21	1990	Vadim Ruban	Sochi

== Back to St. Petersburg (1993–present) ==
Since 1993, the Chigorin Memorial has been played as an open Swiss system tournament. The 13th edition was not played for superstitious reasons. The winners are listed below.

#	Year	Winner
1	1993	Alexey Dreev
2	1994	Ildar Ibragimov
3	1995	Vladimir Burmakin
4	1996	Alexei Fedorov; Lembit Oll
5	1997	Konstantin Sakaev
6	1998	Sergey Volkov
7	1999	Alexander Grischuk; Sergey Volkov
8	2000	Valerij Filippov
9	2001	Mikhail Kobalia
10	2002	Alexander Fominyh
11	2004	Sergey Ivanov
12	2005	Igor Zakharevich; Roman Ovetchkin
14	2006	Dmitry Bocharov
15	2007	Sergei Movsesian
16	2008	Vladimir Belov
17	2009	Sergey Volkov
18	2010	Eltaj Safarli
19	2011	Dmitry Bocharov
20	2012	Alexander Areshchenko
21	2013	Pavel Eljanov
22	2014	Ivan Ivanisevic
23	2015	Kirill Alekseenko
24	2016	Kirill Alekseenko
25	2017	Kirill Alekseenko
26	2018	Pouya Idani
27	2019	Vitaly Sivuk
