= Zagrebelny =

Zagrebelny (Zahrebelny, Zahrebelnyi, Zagrebelnyi, Ukrainian: Загребельний) is a Ukrainian surname. Notable people with the surname include:

- Pavlo Zahrebelnyi (1924–2009) Ukrainian writer
- Sergey Zagrebelny (born 1965), Uzbekistani chess Grandmaster
- Vladyslav Zahrebelnyi (born 1991), Ukrainian Paralympic athlete
