= Marat Dzhumaev =

Uzbekistani chess grandmaster (born 1976)

Personal information
- Born: 12 January 1976 (age 50) Uzbek Soviet Socialist Republic, USSR

Chess career
- Country: Uzbekistan
- Title: Grandmaster (2001)
- Peak rating: 2569 (January 2005)

Marat Dzhumaev (born 12 January 1976) is an Uzbekistani chess Grandmaster (2001) and twice national champion (2012, 2015).

He played for Uzbekistan in the Chess Olympiads of 2000 and 2002, in the World Team Chess Championship of 2001 and in the Asian Team Chess Championships of 1999, 2003 and 2008.

He tied for 1st–3rd with Ziaur Rahman and Sergei Tiviakov at the 6th United Insurance Tournament in Dhaka 2003, came first at Pune 2004 and Lucknow 2004. In 2007 Dzhumaev tied for 1st–3rd with Leonid Yurtaev and Sergey Kayumov in the first edition of the Georgy Agzamov Memorial in Tashkent. In 2011 in the same tournament he tied for 1st–3rd with Tigran L. Petrosian and Anton Filippov. In 2008, he tied for 3rd–7th with Susanto Megaranto, Darwin Laylo, Dražen Sermek and Ashot Nadanian at the 5th Dato' Arthur Tan Malaysia Open Chess Championship in Kuala Lumpur. In 2009, he tied for 1st–2nd with Viacheslav Zakhartsov in the Cappelle-la-Grande Open and tied for 2nd–5th with Tamaz Gelashvili, Lucian-Costin Miron, Amon Simutowe and Vladimir Burmakin in the Rochefort Open. In the same year, he won the Hokim Cup in Tashkent and tied for first with Andrey Kvon in the Tashkent Mayor's Cup. In 2012, tied for 1st–2nd with S. P. Sethuraman in the Rose Valley Tournament in Kolkata.
