= Andrey Rychagov =

Russian chess grandmaster (born 1979)

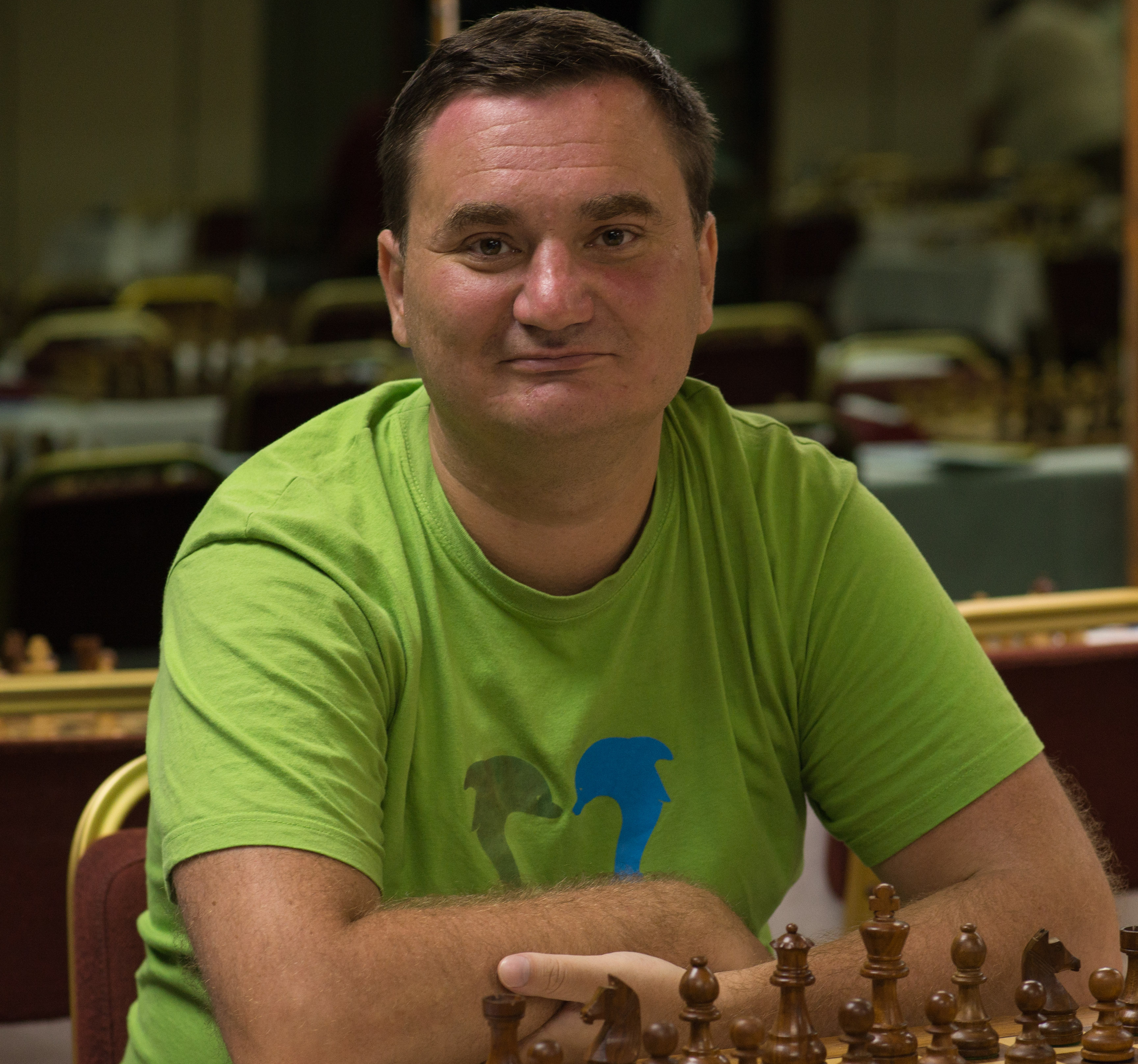
- Rychagov in 2015

Personal information
- Born: August 3, 1979 (age 46) Moscow, Russian SFSR, Soviet Union

Chess career
- Country: Russia
- Title: Grandmaster (2006)
- FIDE rating: 2546 (July 2026)
- Peak rating: 2586 (January 2007)

Andrey Valerievich Rychagov is a Russian chess grandmaster.

== Chess career ==
He was awarded the Grandmaster title in 2006, after achieving his norms at the:

- E. Afromeeva Memorial in July 2004
- Russian Club Championship in April 2005
- Russian Men Team Championship in April 2006

In 2009, he tied for 1st–5th with Sergey Volkov, Hrant Melkumyan, Andrei Deviatkin, and Zhou Weiqi in the Chigorin Memorial.

In June 2015, he tied for second place with Aleksey Goganov, Zaven Andriasian, Evgeny Vorobiov, and Vladimir Ponfilenok in the Rashid Nezhmetdinov Memorial.

In September 2017, he won the Moscow Blitz Championship, defeating Alexey Korotylev in a tiebreak match.
