= Anton Filippov =

Uzbekistani chess grandmaster (born 1986)

Personal information
- Born: 6 December 1986 (age 39) Tashkent, Uzbek SSR, Soviet Union

Chess career
- Country: Uzbekistan
- Title: Grandmaster (2008)
- FIDE rating: 2592 (July 2026)
- Peak rating: 2652 (November 2012)
- Peak ranking: No. 94 (February 2013)

Anton Filippov (born 6 December 1986) is an Uzbek chess grandmaster.

== Career ==
He won the Asian Under 16 Chess Championship 2001 in Doha, and the Asian U18 Athletics Championship in 2004. In 2007 he tied for 1st–3rd with Vladimir Egin and Timur Gareev in the Uzbekistani Chess Championship. In 2008 he won the first Kuala Lumpur Open Championship and tied for 4–8th with Tamaz Gelashvili, Constantin Lupulescu, Nidjat Mamedov and Alexander Zubarev in the Open Romgaz Tournament in Bucharest 2008. In 2009, he won the fourth President Gloria Macapagal Arroyo Cup in Manila, tied for second with Shakhriyar Mamedyarov in the fourth Kolkata Open, tied for 3rd–8th with Vadim Malakhatko, Elshan Moradiabadi, Merab Gagunashvili, Alexander Shabalov and Niaz Murshed in the Ravana Challenge Tournament in Colombo. He qualified for the Chess World Cup 2009 and was knocked out by Surya Shekhar Ganguly in the first round. In 2010 he tied for 3rd–6th with Ding Liren, Zhou Jianchao and Merab Gagunashvili in the first Florencio Campomanes Memorial in Manila and came first in the First Safin Memorial in Tashkent. In 2011, he tied for 1st–3rd with Tigran L. Petrosian and Marat Dzhumaev in the Georgy Agzamov Memorial in Tashkent.

Filippov played for Uzbekistan in the Chess Olympiads of 2004, 2006, 2010, 2012 and 2014.

Filippov recorded his career best performance of 2820 at the 40th Chess Olympiad in Istanbul 2012, where he won the individual silver medal on board two.
