= 30th Chess Olympiad =

1992 chess tournament in Manila, Philippines

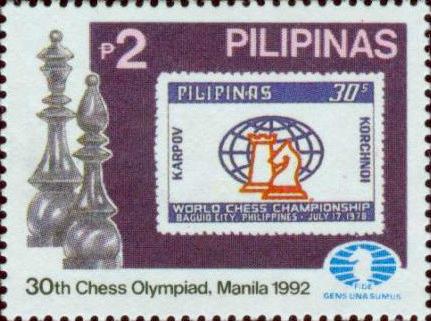
The 30th Chess Olympiad on a 1992 stamp of the Philippines, which also commemorates the World Chess Championship 1978 held in the country.

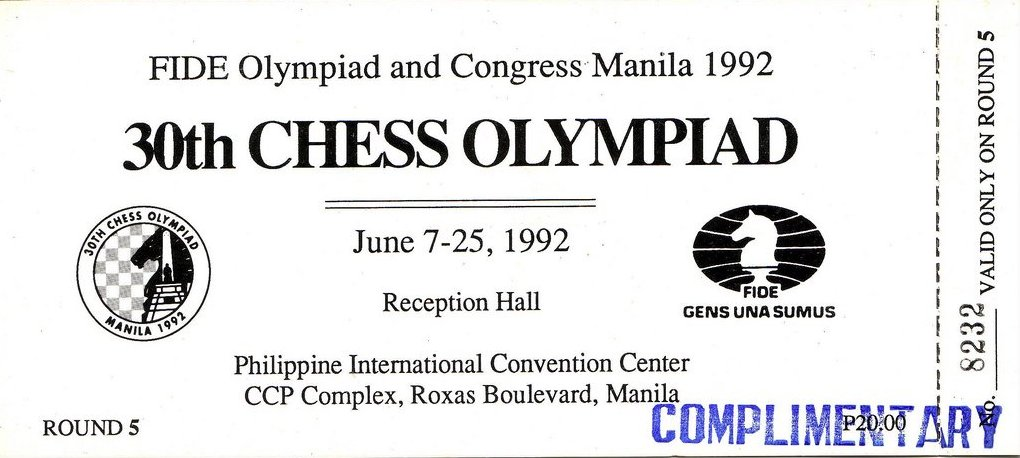
Ticket for 30th Chess Olympiad with logo for the event.

The 30th Chess Olympiad (Tagalog: Ika-30 Olimpiyada sa Ahedres), organized by FIDE and comprising an open and a women's tournament, as well as several other events designed to promote the game of chess, took place between June 7 and June 25, 1992, at the Philippine International Convention Center in Pasay, Metro Manila, Philippines.

Following the fall of the Iron Curtain, the field of competitors was quite different from previous Olympiads. Twelve of the 15 former Soviet republics now competed as independent nations, and they all finished in the top half. Meanwhile, an all-German team was present for the first time since World War II. Of the former Yugoslav republics, Croatia, Bosnia, and Slovenia appeared independently; Serbia-Montenegro and Macedonia did not. This Olympiad also marked the final appearance of Czechoslovakia and the re-appearance of South Africa.

With the Soviet team dissolved, all three medal ranks were now held by different ex-Soviet teams. Russia, captained by world champion Kasparov, took up the legacy of their predecessor and won by four points. Uzbekistan took silver, Armenian took bronze.

== Open event ==
One-hundred-two teams from 100 different nations played a 14-round Swiss system tournament. One-hundred-four teams were signed up, but Yemen and Kenya never showed up, both forfeited their first two matches and were subsequently eliminated. Once again, the host nation had the right to field two additional teams.

In the event of a draw, the tie-break was decided by 1. The Buchholz system; 2. Match points; and 3. The Sonneborn-Berger system.

Open event
#	Country	Players	Average rating	Points
1	Russia	Kasparov, Khalifman, Dolmatov, Dreev, Kramnik, Vyzmanavin	2648	39
2	Uzbekistan	Loginov, Serper, Nenashev, Zagrebelny, Saltaev, Iuldachev	2514	35
3	Armenia	Vaganian, Akopian, Lputian, Minasian, Petrosian, Anastasian	2575	34½

#	Country	Average rating	Points	Buchholz	MP
4	United States	2611	34		
5	Latvia	2566	33½	450.0	
6	Iceland	2544	33½	443.0	
7	Croatia	2523	33½	440.0	
8	Georgia	2560	33	450.0	
9	Ukraine	2629	33	449.5	
10	England	2638	33	444.5	
11	Israel	2544	32½	450.0	
12	Bosnia and Herzegovina	2599	32½	443.5	
13	Germany	2580	32½	433.5	
14	Czechoslovakia	2536	32½	432.0	
15	Switzerland	2488	32½	425.5	
16	China	2523	32½	408.5	
17	Hungary	2588	32	447.0	
18	Sweden	2551	32	440.0	
19	Bulgaria	2541	32	430.5	
20	Colombia	2448	32	420.5	
21	Slovenia	2439	32	409.5	
22	India	2531	31½		
23	Netherlands	2584	31	457.5	
24	Lithuania	2530	31	439.0	
25	Estonia	2525	31	426.5	
26	Peru	2584	31	422.5	
27	France	2521	31	419.0	
28	Brazil	2476	31	414.0	
29	Italy	2430	30½	423.5	
30	Turkmenistan	2284	30½	405.5	
31	Philippines	2478	30½	404.5	
32	Poland	2480	30	425.5	16
33	Norway	2429	30	425.5	14
34	Argentina	2483	30	423.0	
35	Moldova	2490	30	421.5	
36	Romania	2485	30	414.5	
37	Turkey	2363	30	396.5	
38	Kyrgyzstan	2429	29½	428.0	
39	Greece	2490	29½	420.5	
40	Indonesia	2424	29½	414.5	
41	Spain	2483	29½	411.0	
42	Philippines "C"	2355	29½	407.5	
43	Portugal	2440	29½	404.5	
44	Philippines "B"	2399	29½	401.0	
45	Kazakhstan	2376	29	416.5	
46	Australia	2473	29	416.0	
47	Austria	2355	29	407.0	
48	Denmark	2436	28½	411.0	
49	Finland	2440	28½	410.5	
50	Belgium	2454	28½	401.0	
51	Mexico	2465	28½	395.5	
52	Singapore	2391	28½	395.0	
53	Vietnam	2243	28½	390.5	
54	Canada	2435	28½	385.0	
55	Scotland	2424	28	404.0	
56	Tunisia	2331	28	387.0	
57	Chile	2399	27½	402.5	
58	Mongolia	2316	27½	398.0	
59	Andorra	2260	27½	363.0	
60	Bangladesh	2183	27½	350.0	
61	New Zealand	2341	27	390.5	
62	Puerto Rico	2249	27	369.0	
63	South Africa	2064	27	349.0	
64	Egypt	2388	26½	397.5	
65	Faroe Islands	2266	26½	384.5	
66	Algeria	2304	26½	374.0	
67	United Arab Emirates	2060	26½	373.0	
68	Sri Lanka	2136	26½	359.0	
69	Lebanon	2111	26½	355.5	
70	Pakistan	2106	26	388.0	
71	Luxembourg	2263	26	379.5	
72	Japan	2121	26	366.0	15
73	Thailand	2136	26	366.0	12
74	Angola	2263	26	361.0	
75	Wales	2298	25½	384.5	
76	Nigeria	2051	25½	372.0	
77	Morocco	2285	25½	366.5	13
78	Malaysia	2171	25½	366.5	11
79	Qatar	2073	25½	358.0	
80	Nicaragua	2065	25½	349.0	
81	San Marino	2103	25½	334.5	
82	Ireland	2311	25	381.5	
83	Uganda	2280	25	346.0	
84	Mauritania	2051	25	318.5	
85	Hong Kong	2274	24½	365.0	
86	Botswana	2161	24½	349.5	
87	Netherlands Antilles	2000	24½	310.0	
88	Cyprus	2104	24		
89	Zimbabwe	2051	23½	371.0	
90	Liechtenstein	2053	23½	311.5	
91	Papua New Guinea	2103	23	335.0	
92	Malta	2000	23	327.0	
93	Jamaica	2110	22½	367.0	
94	Guernsey and Jersey	2000	22½	317.5	
95	Mali	2051	22	317.0	
96	Brunei	2000	22	306.5	
97	United States Virgin Islands	2054	21½		
98	Palestine	2000	21		
99	Fiji	2051	20½		
100	Bermuda	2138	18		
101	El Salvador	2123	16		
102	Seychelles	2000	14		

=== Individual medals ===
- Performance rating: (Russia) Vladimir Kramnik 2958
- Board 1: (Russia) Garry Kasparov 8½ / 10 = 85.0%
- Board 2: (Brazil) Jaime Sunye Neto 8 / 10 = 80.0%
- Board 3: (Uzbekistan) Alexander Nenashev 9½ / 12 = 79.2%
- Board 4: (El Salvador) Gustavo Zelaya 9 / 10 = 90.0%
- 1st reserve: (Russia) Vladimir Kramnik 8½ / 9 = 94.4%
- 2nd reserve: (Croatia) Ognjen Cvitan 8 / 10 = 80.0%

=== Best game ===
The Brilliancy prize (along with around $4,000) went to Garry Kasparov (Russia) - Predrag Nikolić (Bosnia and Herzegovina) from round 12.

== Women's event ==
Sixty-two teams from 61 different nations (including Philippines "B") played a 14-round Swiss system tournament. Morocco and Zimbabwe were signed up, but didn't show up for their first round matches and were disqualified. Their first three matches were listed as forfeit, after which they were officially withdrawn.

In the event of a draw, the tie-break was decided by 1. The Buchholz system; 2. Match points; and 3. The Sonneborn-Berger system.

Like the open event, the first women's tournament after the dissolution of the Soviet Union was dominated by the former Soviet republics. The Georgian team with two former world champions, Chiburdanidze and Gaprindashvili, took the gold, ahead of Ukraine and China, the latter led by reigning world champion Xie Jun. Defending champions Hungary, once again without any of the famous Polgar sisters, had to settle for fourth place.

#	Country	Players	Average rating	Points
1	Georgia	Chiburdanidze, Gaprindashvili, Ioseliani, Gurieli	2460	30½
2	Ukraine	Galliamova-Ivanchuk, Litinskaya, Chelushkina, Semenova	2373	29
3	China	Xie Jun, Peng Zhaoqin, Wang Pin, Qin Kanying	2398	28½

#	Country	Average rating	Points	Buchholz
4	Hungary	2343	26½	
5	Russia	2347	26	
6	Romania	2317	25	350.0
7	Azerbaijan	2293	25	342.0
8	Kazakhstan	2277	24½	347.0
9	United States	2353	24½	346.5
10	Czechoslovakia	2247	24	338.0
11	Estonia	2232	24	324.5
12	Latvia	2220	24	304.0
13	Poland	2308	23½	322.5
14	Bulgaria	2280	23½	313.5
15	Kyrgyzstan	2215	23	328.5
16	Lithuania	2187	23	312.0
17	Moldova	2158	23	310.5
18	Indonesia	2047	22½	310.0
19	Switzerland	2245	22½	309.0
20	Greece	2285	22½	303.5
21	Turkmenistan	2000	22½	295.5
22	England	2263	22	312.5
23	Mongolia	2078	22	305.5
24	India	2148	22	302.5
25	Israel	2175	22	302.0
26	Slovenia	2065	22	299.5
27	Bangladesh	2002	22	264.0
28	Netherlands	2208	21½	320.0
29	Argentina	2240	21½	306.0
30	Croatia	2223	21½	301.0
31	Bosnia and Herzegovina	2135	21½	294.5
32	Sweden	2102	21½	292.5
33	Armenia	2175	21½	292.0
34	Vietnam	2082	21½	288.5
35	Brazil	2088	21½	277.0
36	Germany	2252	21	326.5
37	Norway	2083	21	298.0
38	Australia	2050	21	289.5
39	Philippines	2012	21	262.5
40	Austria	2062	20	302.5
41	Spain	2225	20	294.5
42	Scotland	2013	20	289.0
43	Venezuela	2018	20	274.0
44	Finland	2095	19½	302.0
45	Canada	2072	19½	286.0
46	France	2112	19½	284.5
47	Malaysia	2008	19½	279.0
48	Turkey	2048	19½	267.5
49	Portugal	2012	19½	250.0
50	Italy	2000	19½	241.0
51	Philippines "B"	2000	19½	238.5
52	Mexico	2033	19	275.0
53	Wales	2060	19	246.5
54	Algeria	2002	18½	250.5
55	Singapore	2000	18½	237.5
56	Sri Lanka	2000	17½	249.0
57	Ireland	2033	17½	233.5
58	Nigeria	2000	14½	
59	Angola	2002	11½	237.0
60	United Arab Emirates	2000	11½	235.5
61	New Zealand	2012	11	
62	Seychelles	2000	5	

=== Individual medals ===
- Performance rating: (Georgia (country)) Maia Chiburdanidze 2692
- Board 1: (Georgia (country)) Maia Chiburdanidze 11½ / 13 = 88.5%
- Board 2: (Russia) Svetlana Prudnikova 8½ / 11 = 77.3%
- Board 3: (Georgia (country)) Nana Ioseliani 10 / 12 = 83.3%
- Reserve: (Sri Lanka) Suneetha Wijesuriya 6½ / 8 = 81.3%
