= Uzbekistani Chess Championship =

National chess championship

The Uzbekistani Chess Championship is a chess tournament held in Uzbekistan.

== Winners ==
#	Year	Winner
1	1930	Azmiddine Khodzhaev
2	1931	Fyodor Duz-Khotimirsky
3	1932	Sergey von Freymann
4	1934	Vasily Panov (off contest), Sergey von Freymann
5	1935	Sergey von Freymann
6	1937	Sergey von Freymann
7	1938	Nikoly Rudnev
8	1940	Skripkin
9	1944	Vitaly Chekhover
10	1945	H. Abdullaev
11	1946	A. Airapetov, S. Khodzhibekov
12	1947	H. Abdullaev
13	1948	Genrikh Kasparian (off contest), A. Airapetov (3rd)
14	1949	Zakir Khodzhaev
15	1950	Vitaly Tarasov (off contest), Georgy Shakh-Zade
16	1951	Alexey Suetin (off contest), Vishniatsky
17	1952	Mamadzhan Mukhitdinov, M. Sarvarov
18	1953	Batygin, Alexander Grushevsky
19	1954	Batygin
20	1955	Leonid Shamkovich (off contest), Alexander Grushevsky
21	1956	Alexander Grushevsky
22	1957	Viktor Korchnoi (off contest), Mamadzhan Mukhitdinov
23	1958	Alexander Grushevsky
24	1959	L. Barenbaum
25	1960	Alexander Grushevsky
26	1961	Alexander Grushevsky, Georgy Shakh-Zade
27	1962	Alexander Grushevsky
28	1963	Alexander Grushevsky, Isaak Birbrager
29	1964	Isaak Birbrager, Evgeny Mukhin
30	1965	Isaac Boleslavsky (off contest), Mamadzhan Mukhitdinov
31	1966	Georgy Borisenko
32	1967	?
33	1968	Georgy Borisenko
34	1969	Sergey T. Pinchuk
35	1970	Leonid Maslov
36	1971	Georgy Borisenko
37	1972	Leonid Maslov
38	1973	Leonid Maslov
39	1974	Levon Grigorian
40	1975	Levon Grigorian
41	1976	Georgy Agzamov, Valery Loginov
42	1977	Igor Ivanov
43	1978	Igor Ivanov
44	1979	Vladimir Egin
45	1980	?
46	1981	Georgy Agzamov
47	1982	Valery Loginov
48	1983	Raset Ziatdinov
49	1984	Valery Loginov
50	1985	Raset Ziatdinov
?	1988	Sergey Zagrebelny
?	1989	Alexander Nenashev
?	1990	Sergey Zagrebelny
?	?	?
?	1993	Saidali Iuldachev
?	?	?
	2001	Shukhrat Safin
	2002	?
68	2003	Saidali Iuldachev
69	2004	Vladimir Egin
70	2005	Anton Filippov
71	2006	Alexei Barsov
72	2007	Anton Filippov
73	2008	Dzhurabek Khamrakulov
74	2009	Dzhurabek Khamrakulov
75	2010	Alexei Barsov
76	2011	Andrey Kvon
77	2012	Marat Dzhumaev
78	2013	Dzhurabek Khamrakulov
79	2014	Ulugbek Tillyaev
80	2015	Marat Dzhumaev
81	2016	Nodirbek Yakubboev
82	2017	Alisher Begmuratov
83	2018	Nodirbek Yakubboev
84	2019	Javokhir Sindarov
85	2020	Nodirbek Yakubboev
86	2021	Javokhir Sindarov
87	2024	Javokhir Sindarov

== Women ==
Year	Winner
2001	Iroda Khamrakulova
2002	?
2003	Lidia Malinicheva
2004	Olga Kim
2005	Iroda Khamrakulova
2006	Olga Sabirova
2007	Iroda Khamrakulova
2008	Nafisa Muminova
2009	Nafisa Muminova
2010	Olga Sabirova
2011	Nafisa Muminova
2012	Sarvinoz Kurbonboeva
2013	Hulkar Tohirjonova
2014	Sarvinoz Kurbonboeva
2015	Sarvinoz Kurbonbaeva
2016	Gulrukhbegim Tokhirjonova
2017	Nodira Nadirjanova
2018	Gulrukhbegim Tokhirjonova
2019	Nilufar Yakubbaeva
2020	Nilufar Yakubbaeva
2021	Nilufar Yakubbaeva
