= Zakharevich =

Zakharevich, Russian Захаревич, is a Russian patrimonial surname, it means son of Zakhar. Notable people with the surname include:

- Igor Zakharevich (1963-2008), Russian chess Grandmaster
- Valery Zakharevich (born 1967), Russian fencer
- Yury Zakharevich (born 1963), Russian weightlifter
