= Andrei Deviatkin =

Russian chess grandmaster (born 1980)

Personal information
- Born: Андрей Девяткин; October 7, 1980 (age 45) Moscow, Soviet Union

Chess career
- Country: Russia
- Title: Grandmaster (2008)
- FIDE rating: 2442 (July 2026)
- Peak rating: 2608 (November 2010)

Andrei Deviatkin (Russian: Андрей Девяткин; born October 7, 1980, in Moscow) is a Russian chess grandmaster (2008).

== Chess career ==
- 2007 – tied for 1st–9th with Alexei Fedorov, Vladimir Potkin, Aleksej Aleksandrov, Viacheslav Zakhartsov, Alexander Evdokimov, Denis Khismatullin, Evgeny Tomashevsky and Sergei Azarov in the Aratovsky Memorial in Saratov;
- 2008 – tied for 1st–8th with Vugar Gashimov, David Arutinian, Sergey Fedorchuk, Konstantin Chernyshov, Yuriy Kryvoruchko, Vasilios Kotronias and Erwin L'Ami in the Cappelle-la-Grande Open Tournament;
- 2009 – tied for 5th–10th with Chakkravarthy Deepan, Georgy Timoshenko, Sundar Shyam, Saidali Iuldachev and Shukhrat Safin in the Mumbai Mayor's Cup;
- 2009 – tied for 1st–5th with Sergey Volkov, Andrey Rychagov, Hrant Melkumyan and Zhou Weiqi in the Chigorin Memorial;
- 2011 – won the Doeberl Cup in Canberra;
- 2012 – tied for 2nd–4th with Ziaur Rahman and Attila Czebe in the Mumbai Mayor's Cup;
- 2018 – won the OSS International in Oslo.

His handle on the Internet Chess Club is "Shadeath".

== Notable games ==
- Andrei Deviatkin vs Sergei Movsesian, 5th Amplico AIG Life 2005, Sicilian Defense: Alapin Variation (B22), 1-0
- Andrei Deviatkin vs Ni Hua, Russian Team Ch. 2009, Queen's Indian Defense: Petrosian Variation (E12), 1-0
