= Nodira Nadirjanova =

Uzbekistani chess player (born 1990)

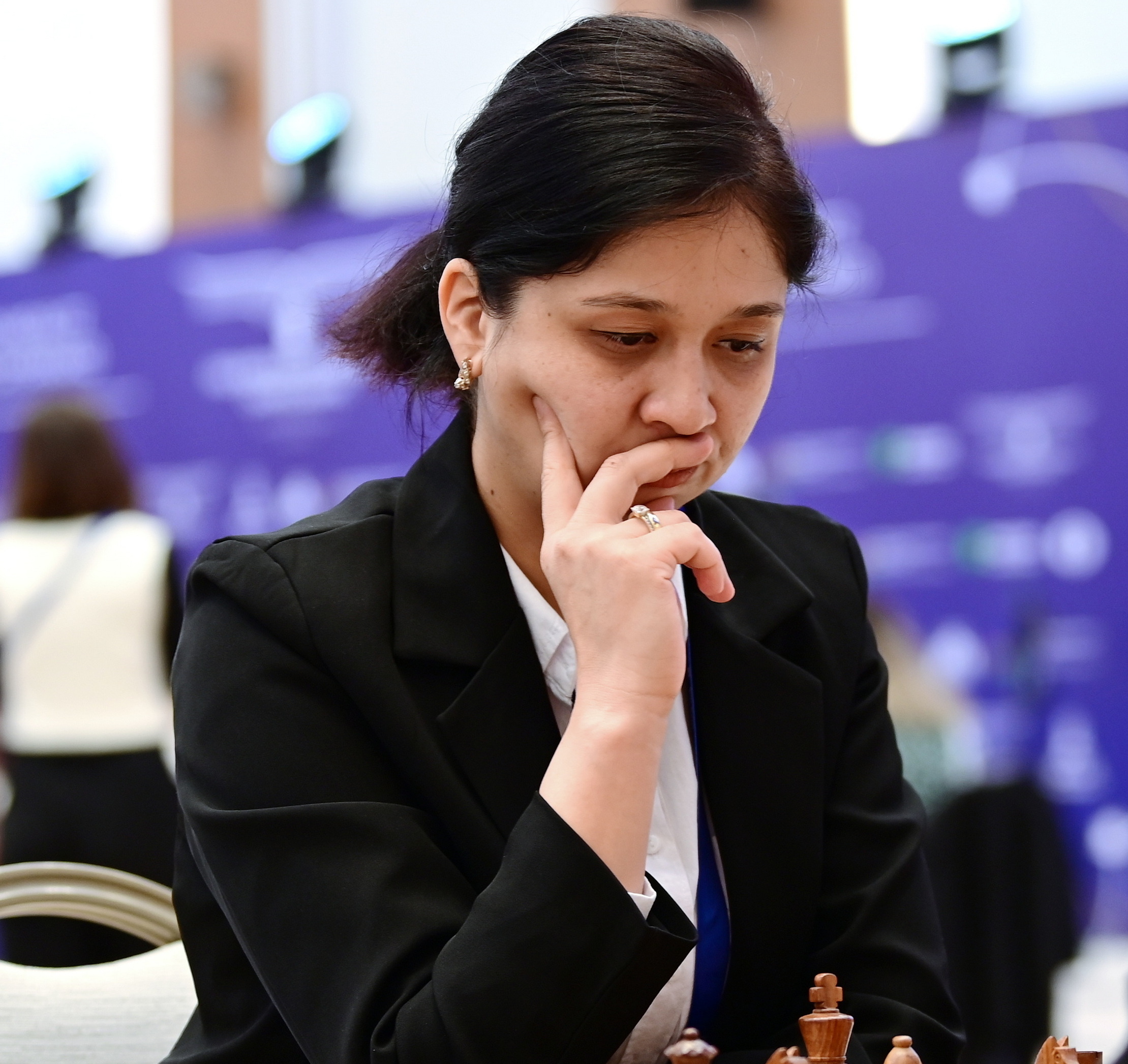
- Nodira Nadirjanova in 2023

Personal information
- Born: 11 September 1990 (age 35)

Chess career
- Country: Uzbekistan
- Title: Woman International Master (2017)
- Peak rating: 2195 (January 2012)

Nodira Nadirjanova (born 11 September 1990) is an Uzbekistani chess player who holds the title of Woman International Master (2017). In 2017 she won Uzbekistani Women's Chess Championships. In 2024 she won individual silver medal in 45th Chess Olympiad (women).

== Biography ==
In 2007 Nodira Nadirjanova ranked in 10th place in World Youth Chess Championship in girls U18 age group.

Nodira Nadirjanova regularly participates in the finals of the Uzbekistani Women's Chess Championships. Her best achievements in this tournaments is 1st place in 2017 and 3rd place in 2018.

Nodira Nadirjanova played for Uzbekistan in the Women's Chess Olympiads:

- In 2008, at reserve board in the 38th Chess Olympiad (women) in Dresden (+6, =2, -1),
- In 2010, at fourth board in the 39th Chess Olympiad (women) in Khanty-Mansiysk (+5, =3, -1),
- In 2012, at fourth board in the 40th Chess Olympiad (women) in Istanbul (+5, =2, -3),
- In 2016, at reserve board in the 42nd Chess Olympiad (women) in Baku (+1, =3, -1),
- In 2018, at fourth board in the 43rd Chess Olympiad (women) in Batumi (+3, =2, -2),
- In 2024, at reserve board in the 45th Chess Olympiad (women) in Budapest (+6, =2, -0) and won individual silver medal.

In 2017, she was awarded the FIDE Women International Master (WIM) title.
