= Leonid Maslov =

Uzbekistani chess player (born 1935)

Personal information
- Born: 1935 (age 90–91)

Chess career
- Country: Soviet Union; Uzbekistan

Leonid Maslov (Russian: Леонид Петрович Маслов; Lithuanian: Leonidas Maslovas; born 1935) is a Lithuanian and Uzbekistani chess player who three times won Lithuanian Chess Championships (1962, 1963, 1966) and Uzbekistani Chess Championships (1970, 1972, 1973).

== Biography ==
Leonid Maslov lived in Vilnius, played for Lithuanian Sports Associations Žalgiris. He three times won Lithuanian Chess Championship: 1962, 1963, and 1966. He participated in the Baltic Chess Championship in 1960 and 1961.

Leonid Maslov with Lithuanian SSR national team was a multiple participant in the USSR Team Chess Championships (1958, 1962) and Spartakiad of the Peoples of the USSR Team Chess Tournaments (1959, 1963, 1967). In 1963 and 1967 he played on the 1st board. Also he played for Lithuanian SSR in Match-Tournaments with East Germany chess team and the Latvian SSR team (1961) and Poland chess team (1969). Leonid Maslov with Lithuanian Sports Associations Žalgiris chess team participated in the USSR Club Chess Championship in 1966 in group B.

In the late 1960s Leonid Maslov moved to Tashkent.

He three time won Uzbekistani Chess Championships: 1970, 1972, and 1973.

Leonid Maslov was member of the national team of the Uzbek SSR and participated of the All-Union Chess Olympiad in 1972, Spartakiad of the Peoples of the USSR Team Chess Tournament (1975).

In 1973 he was shared 1st-2nd places with Vitaly Tseshkovsky in A. Khodzhaev Memorial Chess Tournament in Tashkent.
