= Alexander Graf =

Uzbekistani-German chess grandmaster (born 1962)

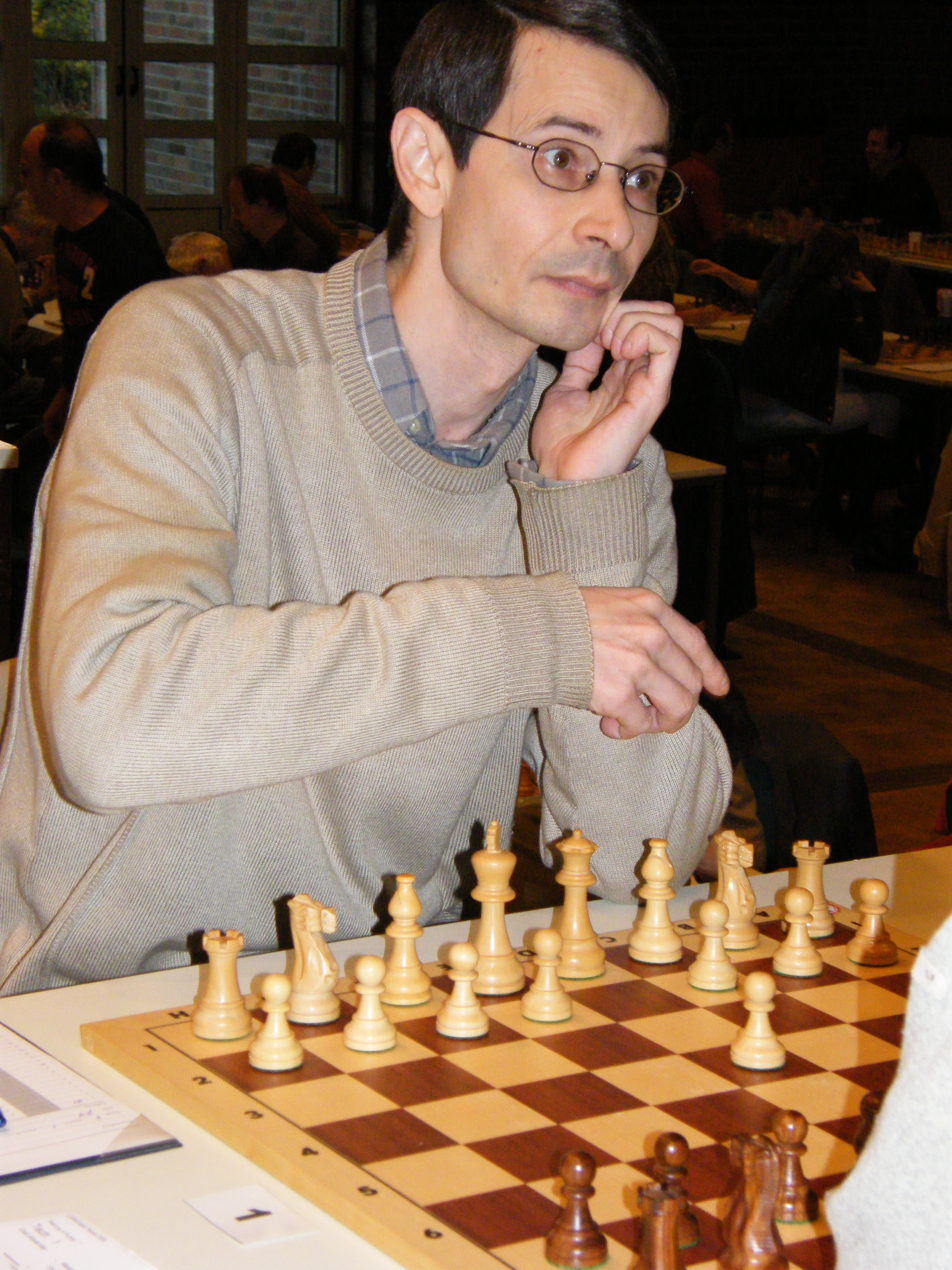
- Graf in 2008

Personal information
- Born: 25 August 1962 (age 64) Tashkent, Uzbek Soviet Socialist Republic, USSR

Chess career
- Country: Uzbekistan (until 2001); Germany (since 2001)
- Title: Grandmaster (1992)
- FIDE rating: 2492 (November 2026)
- Peak rating: 2661 (July 2004)
- Peak ranking: No. 38 (April 2001)

Alexander Graf (né Nenashev; born 25 August 1962) is an Uzbekistani-German chess grandmaster. He was Uzbekistani Chess Champion in 1989 and German Chess Champion in 2004.

== Chess career ==
He won the Uzbekistani Chess Championship in 1989. Nenashev played for the silver medal-winning Uzbek team at the 1992 Chess Olympiad in Manila; he also won the individual gold medal on board three. In 1996 Nenashev won the Cappelle-la-Grande Open. In 2000 he took German citizenship. In the same year he won the 2nd Dubai Open and the 4th Offene Internationale Bayerische Schach Meisterschaft ("Open International Bavarian Chess Championship") in Bad Wiessee. In 2001 he took his father's surname "Graf" and started to represent Germany. Graf won the bronze medal in the 2003 European Individual Chess Championship. In 2004 he won the German Chess Championship. Graf won at Bad Wiessee for the second time in his career in 2011.

== Personal life ==
Alexander Graf is married to German-Azerbaijani Woman Grandmaster Rena Graf (Mamedova).
