= Georgy Borisenko =

Personal information
- Full name: Georgy Konstantinovich Borisenko
- Born: May 25, 1922 Chuhuiv, USSR
- Died: December 3, 2012 (aged 90) Tashkent, Uzbekistan

Chess career
- Country: USSR
- Title: Russian Correspondence Grandmaster
- Peak rating: 2440 (May 1974)

Georgy Konstantinovich Borisenko (May 25, 1922 — December 3, 2012) was a Soviet correspondence chess grandmaster and chess theoretician. Among the players he trained were Nona Gaprindashvili, Valentina Borisenko (who was also his wife), Viktor Korchnoi, Mark Taimanov, and Timur Gareyev. He became a Russian Master of Sport in 1950 and a Russian Correspondence Grandmaster in 1966. He won the USSR Correspondence Championship twice, in 1957 and 1962, and came in second in 1965. One of his best-known games was played from 1960 to 1963 against Anatoly Rubezov, and is included in multiple anthologies of brilliant chess games. In 1973, David Bronstein described Borisenko as "one of our greatest theoretical experts." In Russia, the Breyer Variation of the Ruy Lopez is known as the "Borisenko-Furman" variation because Borisenko and Semyon Furman were central in bringing it into use in the 1950s. Another line of the Closed Ruy Lopez is also named after him; specifically, the line in the Chigorin Variation which goes 9...Na5 10.Bc2 c5 11.d4 Nc6. His wife Valentina Borisenko was also a chess player and held a Candidate Master title.
