= Raset Ziatdinov =

Uzbekistani-American chess grandmaster (born 1958)

Personal information
- Born: December 27, 1958 (age 67) Tashkent, Uzbek SSR, Soviet Union

Chess career
- Country: Soviet Union (until 1992); Uzbekistan (1992–1997); United States (since 1997)
- Title: Grandmaster (2005)
- Peak rating: 2535 (July 1997)

Raset Agiliaevich Ziatdinov (Uzbek: Расет Агилиаевич Зиатдинов) is an Uzbekistani-American chess grandmaster.

== Chess career ==
Ziatdinov won the Uzbekistani Chess Championship in 1983 and 1985, also playing for the Uzbek SSR at the Soviet Team Championships in both years. He was awarded the grandmaster title in 2005.

In 2000, Ziatdinov tied for first place at the U.S. Masters Chess Championship.

His book, GM-RAM: Essential Grandmaster Knowledge (2000) has a distinctive approach, consisting mostly of positions without analysis or commentary. Even the side to move is not given.

In May 2022, Ziatdinov was defeated in an upset by 10-year-old Sathvik Adiga in the 13th KIIT International Chess Festival.
