= Shukhrat Safin =

Uzbekistani chess grandmaster (1970–2009)

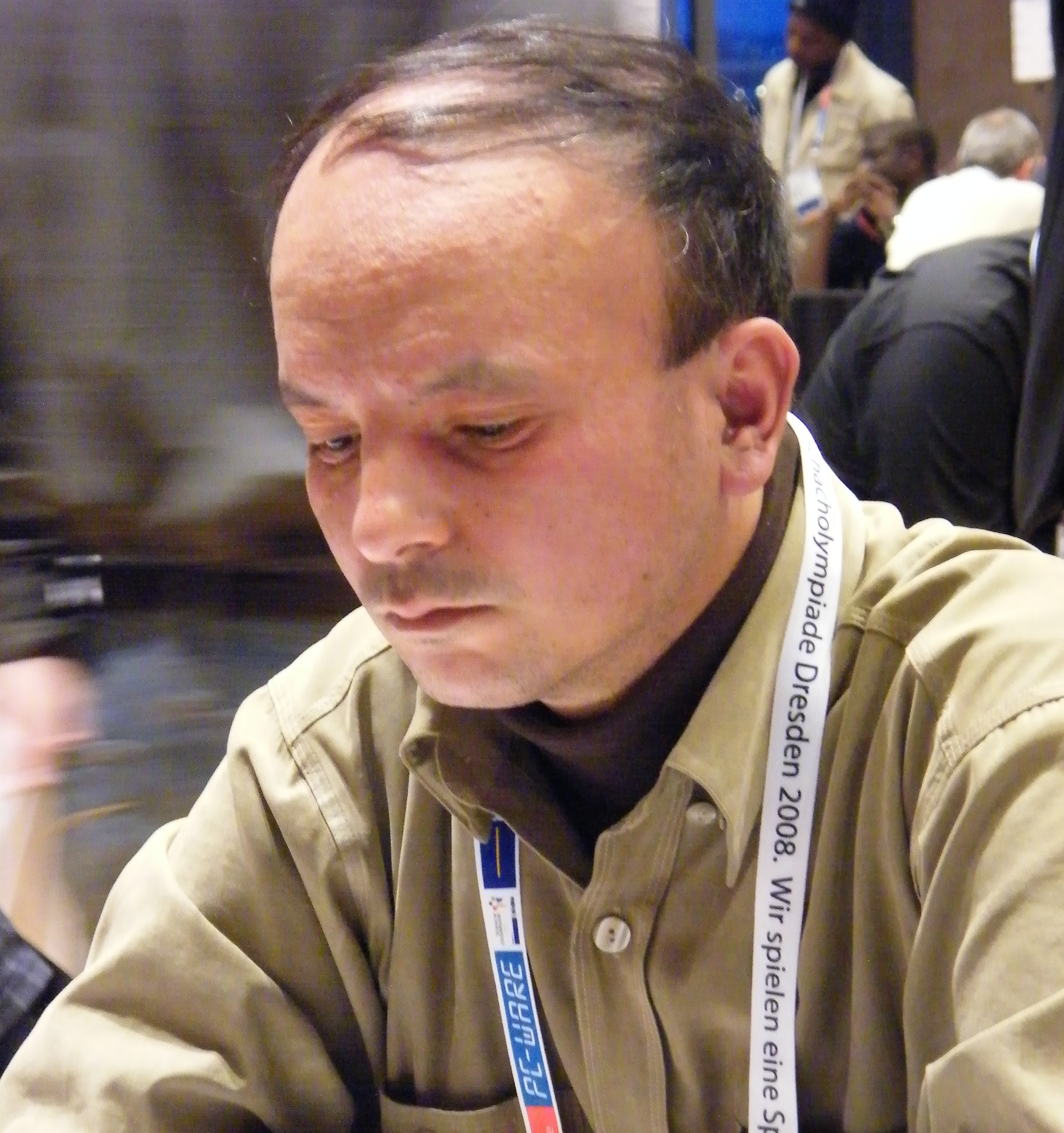
- Safin at the 2008 Chess Olympiad, Dresden

Personal information
- Born: April 3, 1970 Samarkand, Uzbek SSR, Soviet Union
- Died: September 20, 2009 (aged 39) Samarkand, Uzbekistan

Chess career
- Country: Uzbekistan
- Title: Grandmaster (1999)
- Peak rating: 2542 (October 2002)

Shukhrat Safin (3 April 1970 – 20 September 2009) was an Uzbekistani chess player. He was awarded the title of Grandmaster by FIDE in 1999.

Safin shared first place with Mikhail Gurevich and Victor Mikhalevski in the Hogeschool Zeeland Tournament in Vlissingen. He finished third on tiebreak score. In 2001, Safin won the Uzbekistani Chess Championship. In late November of the same year, he took part in the FIDE World Championship. Here he was knocked out in the first round by Predrag Nikolić. In 2002 Safin tied for 1st–3rd with Mikhail Ulibin and Evgeny Gleizerov at the Masters tournament of the 12th Abu Dhabi Chess Festival. In 2008 he came third in the Kolkata Open. In 2009, he tied for 5th-10th with Chakkravarthy Deepan, Georgy Timoshenko, Sundar Shyam, Saidali Iuldachev and Andrei Deviatkin in the Mumbai Mayor Cup.

Safin played for Uzbekistan's national team in the Chess Olympiads of 1996, 1998, 2000, 2002 and 2008, in the World Team Chess Championship 2001 and in the Asian Team Chess Championships of 1995 and 2003. In the 1995 event he won two medals: team bronze and individual silver on board four.

He died of blood cancer in his native city of Samarkand.
