= Valery Loginov =

Russian chess grandmaster (born 1955)

Personal information
- Born: 13 December 1955 (age 70) Syzran, Russia

Chess career
- Country: Soviet Union; Uzbekistan; Russia
- Title: Grandmaster (1991)
- FIDE rating: 2468 (July 2026)
- Peak rating: 2610 (July 1994)

Valery Loginov (Russian: Валерий Александрович Логинов; born 13 December 1955), is a Soviet and Russian chess Grandmaster (GM) (1991) who from 1992 to 1995 played for Uzbekistan. Three-times Uzbekistani Chess Championship winner (1976, 1982, 1984), Saint Petersburg City Chess Championship (2000, 2004, 2005), Chess Olympiad team silver medalist (1992).

== Biography ==
After graduating from Leningrad Institute of Pulp and Paper Technology, Valery Loginov worked for many years in Uzbekistan. Three times he won the Uzbekistani Chess Championship: 1976, 1982, and 1984. In 1991, in Azov Valery Loginov won a bronze medal with Uzbekistan team in the last Soviet Team Chess Championship. Many times he won Budapest International Chess Tournaments (1990, 1991), as well as the Budapest International Chess Tournament Series First Saturday (1993, 1994) and Spring Open (1994). Valery Loginov has also won international chess tournaments in Ljubljana (1995), in Graz (1998), and in St. Petersburg (1999). In the late 1990's, Loginov returned to Russia. After moving back to his native city, he three times won Saint Petersburg City Chess Championships: 2000, 2004, and 2005.

Valery Loginov played for Uzbekistan in the Chess Olympiads:

- In 1992, at first board in the 30th Chess Olympiad in Manila (+1, =6, -6) and won team silver medal,
- In 1994, at first board in the 31st Chess Olympiad in Moscow (+3, =6, -2).

In 1989, he was awarded the FIDE International Master (IM) title and received the FIDE Grandmaster (GM) title two years later.
