= Nikoly Rudnev =

Ukrainian-Uzbekistani chess player

Nikoly (Nikolay) Nikolaevich Rudnev (Rudniev) (1895–1944) was a Ukrainian–Uzbekistani chess master.

Born in Kharkiv, he played in the Mannheim 1914 chess tournament (Hauptturnier B). After World War I and Bolshevik Revolution, he was sent to Uzbekistan. He tied for 1st with Sergey von Freymann in the Championship of Middle Asia in 1927, took 6th in the 6th USSR Chess Championship at Odessa 1929 (quarter final).

He took 2nd, behind von Freymann, at Tashkent 1932 (the 3rd UZB-ch), tied for 8-9th at Tashkent 1934 (the 4th UZB-ch, Vasily Panov won, off contest), Rudnev won the 7th Uzbekistani Chess Championship in 1938.
