= Sergey Smagin =

Russian chess grandmaster (born 1958)

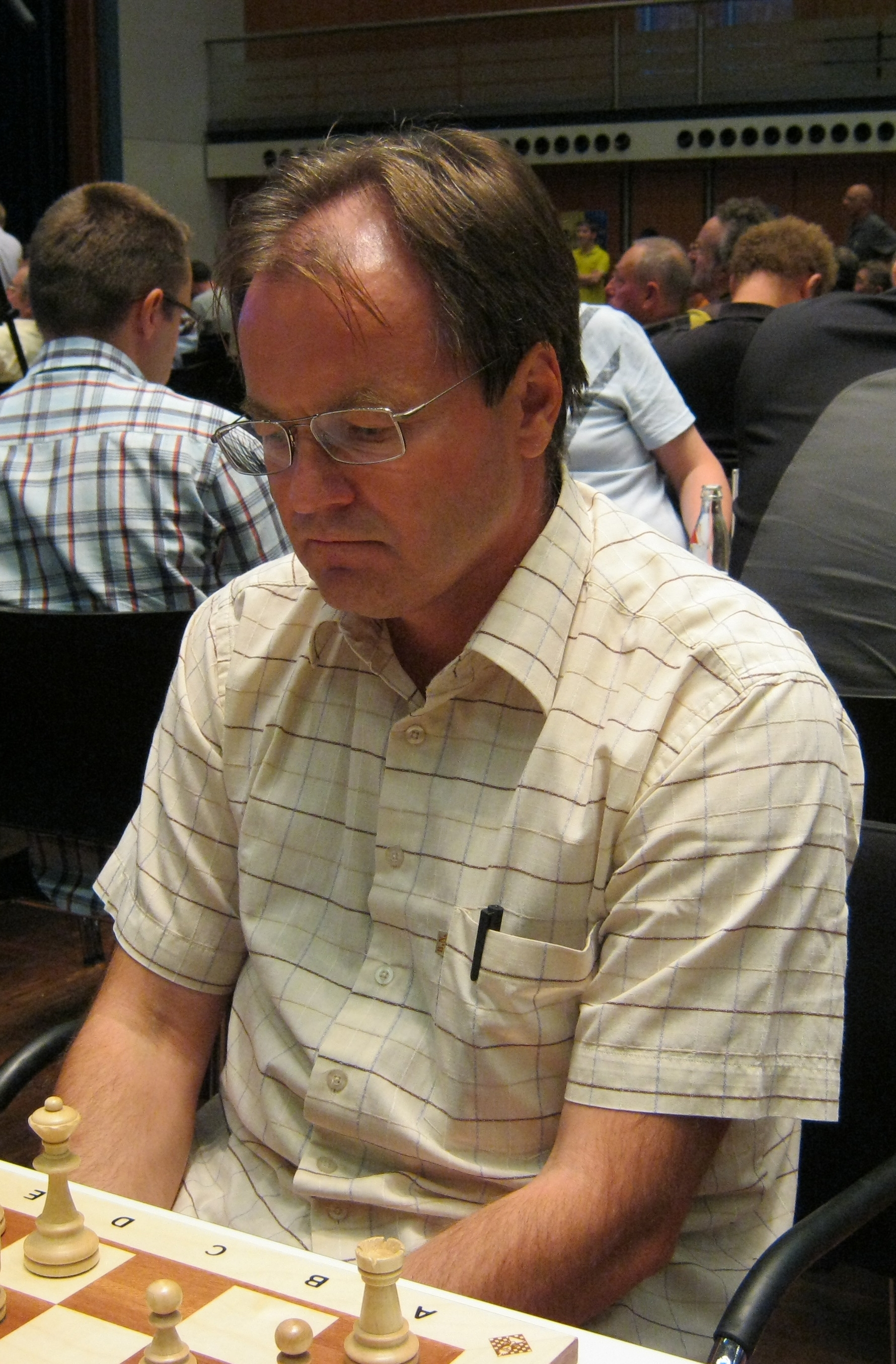

Personal information
- Born: Сергей Смагин; September 8, 1958 (age 67) Norilsk, USSR

Chess career
- Country: Russia
- Title: Grandmaster (1985)
- FIDE rating: 2551 (July 2026)
- Peak rating: 2613 (April 2001)
- Peak ranking: No. 42 (July 1987)

Sergey Smagin (born in Norilsk, 8 September 1958) is a Russian chess grandmaster.

He played in the Soviet championships of 1985 and 1986, obtaining his best result at Riga 1986, where he place 3rd-6th in a field of twenty.

His tournament successes include the following:

- 1984 : first at Tashkent
- 1985 : equal first at Dresden
- 1986 : first at the 2nd Cappelle-la-Grande Open
- 1987 : equal first at the Chigorin Memorial of St Petersburg with Evgeny Pigusov and Andrei Kharitonov; first at Trnava; equal first at Zenica; equal first at Sochi
- 1988 : first at Berlin
- 1993 : first at the Amantea open (repeated in 1994)
- 2000 : equal first at Montreal with Eduardas Rozentalis

Smagin reached his peak Elo rating in April 2001, with 2613 points.

He currently plays in the Russian team championship with the Club MCF Moskva. In recent years, Smagin's tournament appearances have been rare but he is proactively involved in Chess Administration occupying important posts within the Russian and Moscow chess Federations.
