= Timur Gareyev =

American chess grandmaster (born 1988)

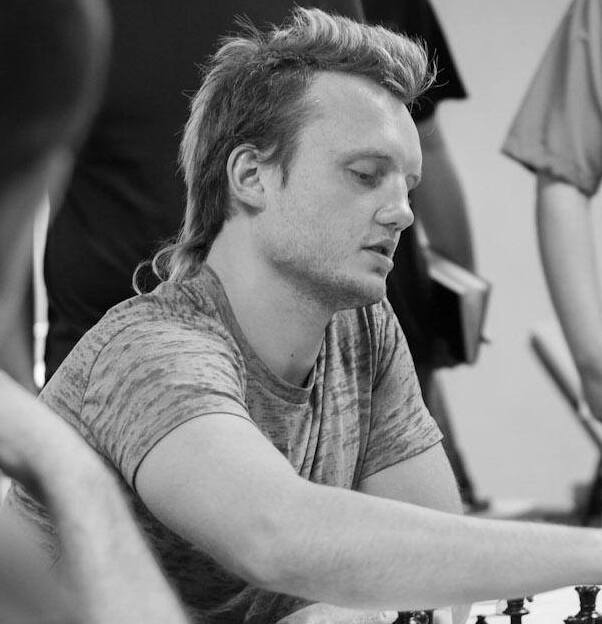
- Gareyev in 2015

Personal information
- Born: March 3, 1988 (age 38) Tashkent, Uzbek SSR, Soviet Union

Chess career
- Country: Uzbekistan (until 2012); United States (2012–2024); None (since 2024) (Note: Gareyev's FIDE federation was listed as "Non Federation" beginning in March 2024 after his suspension from the United States Chess Federation due to sexual misconduct allegations.)
- Title: Grandmaster (2004)
- FIDE rating: 2546 (October 2026)
- Peak rating: 2682 (February 2013)
- Peak ranking: No. 67 (June 2013)

Timur Gareyev (sometimes spelled Gareev; born March 3, 1988) is an Uzbekistani and American chess grandmaster.

== Biography ==
Gareyev was born in Tashkent to Tatar parents.

Gareyev graduated with a B.A. degree in Business Marketing from the University of Texas at Brownsville. While there, he was a part of their chess team, where he helped the university obtain its first national championship, along with other collegiate honors.

Gareyev has participated in two Chess Olympiads: 2004 Calvià, Spain; and 2006 Turin, Italy.

In 2007, Gareyev tied for first with Vladimir Egin and Anton Filippov in the Uzbekistani Chess Championship.

In 2011, Gareyev won the 20th Annual Chicago Open and the 11th Metropolitan Chess FIDE Invitational tournament.

Gareyev's simultaneous blindfold chess record includes a 19-game blindfold simul in Cypress, Texas, September 2012, a 27-game (set in stages) simul in Hawaii Dec 2012, a 33-game (set in stages) match in St Louis, May 2013 and a world record 48-board simul in Las Vegas, on December 4, 2016.

Gareyev won the North American Open 2012 and tied for third in the U.S. Chess Championship 2013. He won the U.S. Open with an 8-1 clear-first-place score in 2018.

Gareyev's win in the 2018 US Open qualified him for a place in the 2019 U.S. Chess Championship, where he finished in a three-way tie for 9th place out of a field of 12.

In 2018, Gareyev tied for first place to win the 119th edition of the U.S. Masters Chess Championship. Since Gareyev is a skydiver with close to 150 solo jumps, Chess Life magazine published his sky-diving photo with a chess board as a cover.

In 2020, Gareyev won first place in the 27th annual Western Class Championship tied with John Daniel Bryant.

In 2022, Gareyev won the American Continental Chess Championship with a score of 9½/11 (+8, =3, -0), and qualified for the Chess World Cup 2023.

In 2023, Lichess published an article stating "Lichess has obtained documents that show [Gareyev] has faced multiple sexual misconduct complaints since 2019".

In 2023, US Chess updated Gareyev's status in the Sanctioned Players list to state: "Membership permanently revoked and permanently banned from appearing at, attending, or participating in any events or activities organized, sanctioned, or to be rated by the US Chess Federation or any of its affiliates", with the Offense given as "Violations of US Chess Member Safety".

Gareyev lived in Southern California but now lives in Kansas.
