= Lucian-Costin Miron =

Romanian chess grandmaster (born 1987)

Personal information
- Born: September 14, 1987 (age 38) Ploiești, Romania

Chess career
- Country: Romania
- Title: Grandmaster (2019)
- FIDE rating: 2484 (July 2026)
- Peak rating: 2544 (June 2013)

Lucian-Costin Miron is a Romanian chess grandmaster.

== Chess career ==
In 2009, he tied for 2nd–5th with Tamaz Gelashvili, Marat Dzhumaev, Amon Simutowe and Vladimir Burmakin in the Rochefort Open.

He was awarded the Grandmaster title in 2019, achieving his norms at the:

- 3rd Balkan Individual Championship in December 2011, in which he shared second place with grandmaster Julian Radulski.
- Romanian Chess Championship in February 2013
- Memorial V. Cebanenko in May 2019, in which he won the tournament half a point ahead of the runner-up.

In July 2022, he was the captain of the Romanian Open Olympiad team.
