= Mihail Saltaev =

Uzbekistani chess grandmaster (born 1962)

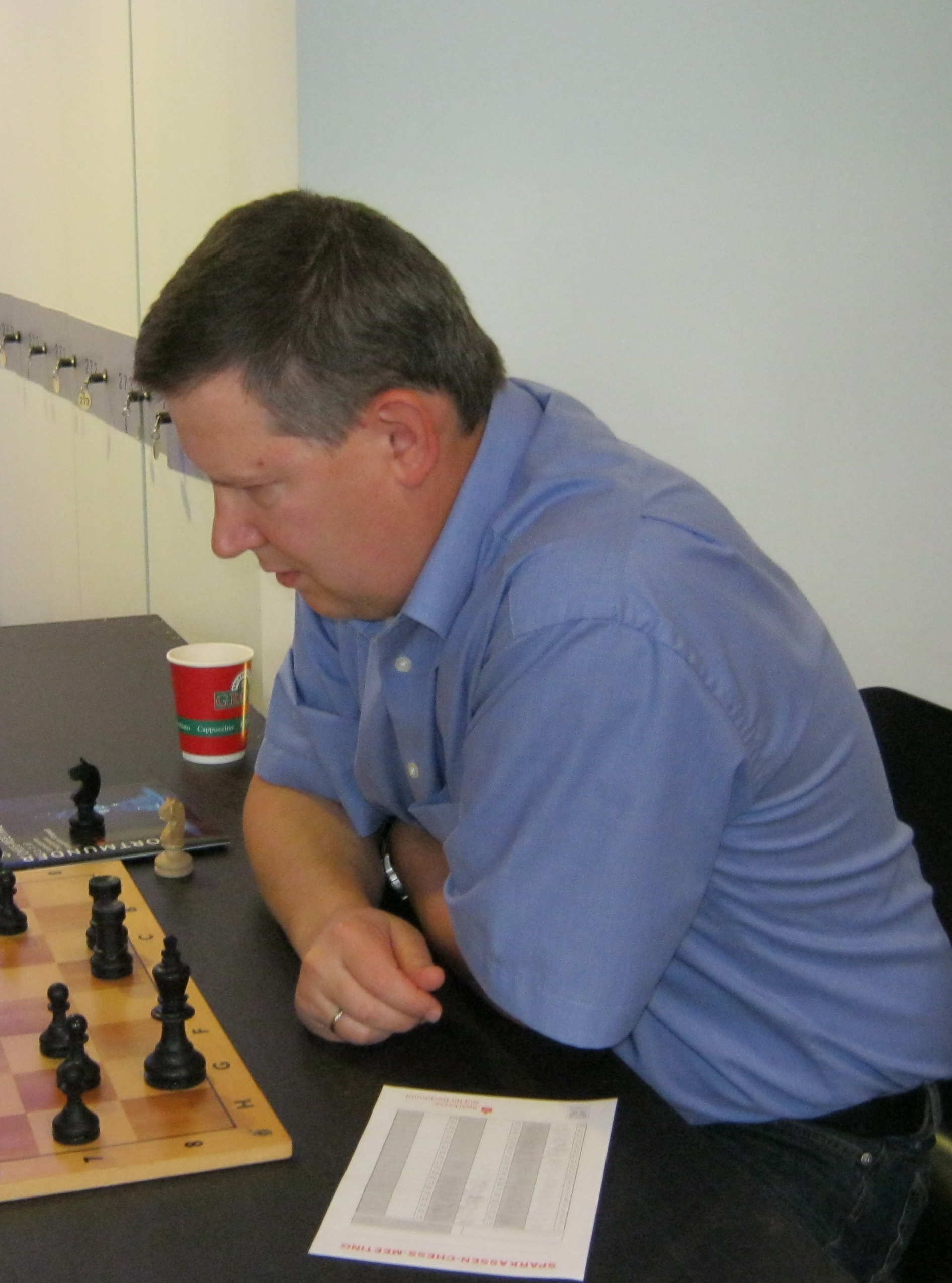
- Mihail Saltaev in 2011

Personal information
- Born: 19 November 1962 (age 63)

Chess career
- Country: Soviet Union; Uzbekistan
- Title: Grandmaster (1995)
- FIDE rating: 2429 (July 2026)
- Peak rating: 2535 (July 1996)

Mihail Saltaev (Uzbek: Mixail Saltayev; born 19 November 1962), is a Soviet and Uzbekistani chess Grandmaster (GM) (1995), Chess Olympiad team silver medalist (1992).

== Biography ==
In 1991, in Azov Mihail Saltaev won a bronze medal with Uzbekistan team in the last Soviet Team Chess Championship. He has also won international chess tournaments in Chemnitz (1990), in Vladivostok (1995), in Moscow (1995, 1996), in Neukloster (2001), in Essen (2002), in Hamburg (2006).

Mihail Saltaev played for Uzbekistan in the Chess Olympiads:

- In 1992, at first reserve board in the 30th Chess Olympiad in Manila (+2, =0, -1) and won team silver medal,
- In 1996, at first board in the 32nd Chess Olympiad in Yerevan (+1, =3, -5),
- In 1998, at fourth board in the 33rd Chess Olympiad in Elista (+4, =5, -2).

Mihail Saltaev played for Uzbekistan in the Men's Asian Team Chess Championship:

- In 1995, at third board in the 11th Asian Team Chess Championship in Singapore (+5, =4, -0) and won team and individual bronze medals.

In 1990, he was awarded the FIDE International Master (IM) title and received the FIDE Grandmaster (GM) title five years later.
