= Monika Krupa =

Polish chess player (born 1977)

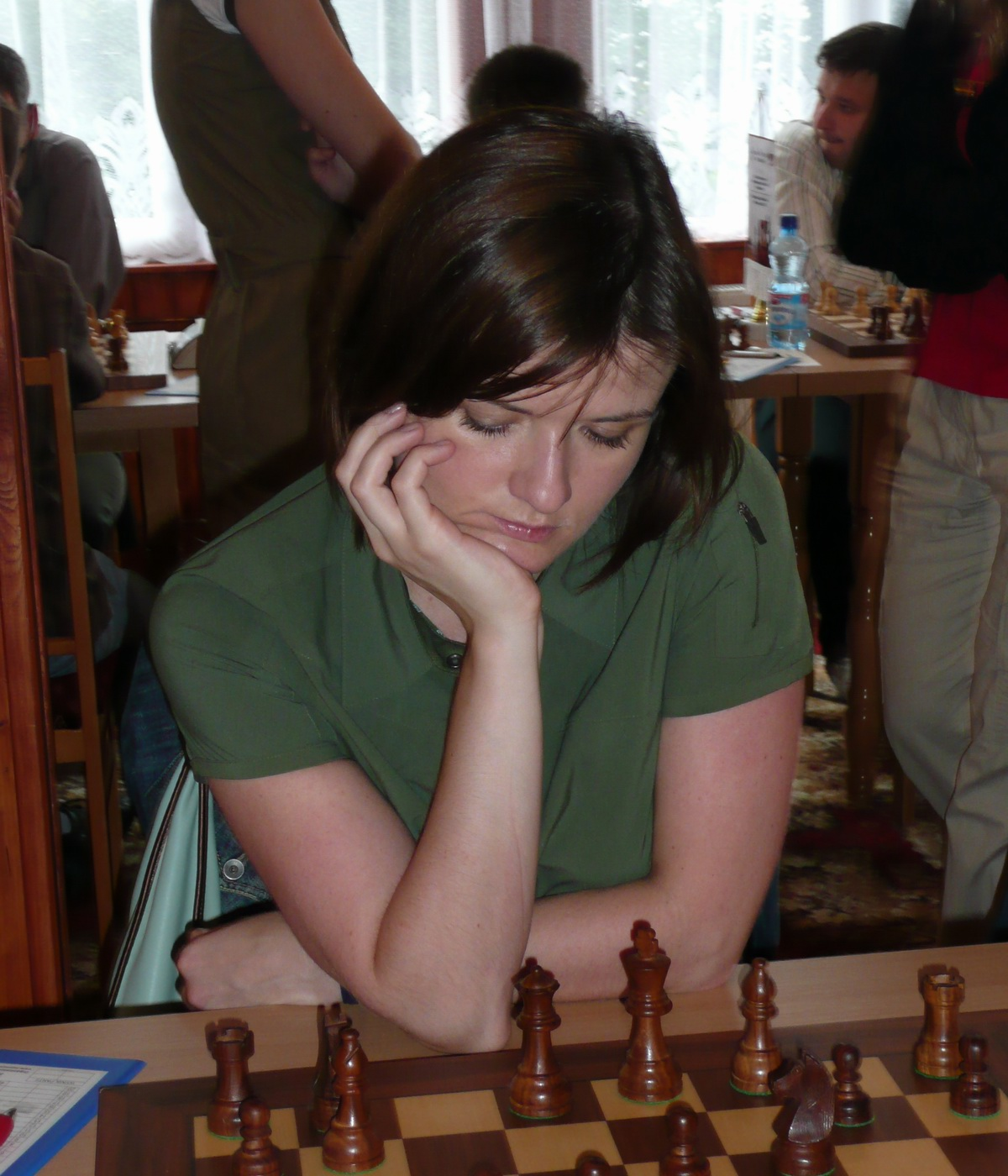
- Monika Krupa, Karpacz 2008

Personal information
- Born: 3 December 1977 (age 48) Wrocław, Poland

Chess career
- Country: Poland
- Title: Woman Grandmaster (2008)
- FIDE rating: 2140 (October 2021)
- Peak rating: 2309 (October 2006)

Monika Krupa (née Aksiuczyc, born 3 December 1977) is a Polish chess player who holds the FIDE title of Woman Grandmaster (2008).

== Chess career ==
Between 1991 and 1994 she won the Polish Junior Chess Championship's titles. Four times (1991, 1994, 1996, and 1997) represented Poland at the World Junior Chess Championship. The best result was eighth place in 1997 in Medellín in category under the age of 20. In 1995 she first time appeared in the Polish Women's Chess Championship's final and taking fifth place. Later Monika won silver medal in 1997. She won gold (2011), 2 silver (2008, 2010) and bronze (2009) medals in Polish Women's Team Chess Championships.

Monika Krupa played for Poland in European Team Chess Championship:

- In 1997, at first reserve board in the 2nd European Team Chess Championship (women) in Pula (+1, =1, -1).

The winner in the Swiss-system tournaments in Olomouc (1998), Lubniewice (2002), Wrocław (2005) and Olomouc tournament Proclient Cup (2006). In 2008, she placed third in tournament in Mariánské Lázně and complete third norm for Woman Grandmaster (WGM) title.

Currently she represents the color of Wrocław club "Polonia". Monika also known as Scrabble and Sudoku player.

In 2013 Monika together with her husband Krzysztof released book "Królestwo geniuszu i fantazji" ("The Kingdom of genius and imagination") (ISBN 978-83-934672-1-1), with the preface written by Grandmaster Vassily Ivanchuk.
