= Sergey von Freymann =

Russian chess player (1882–1946)

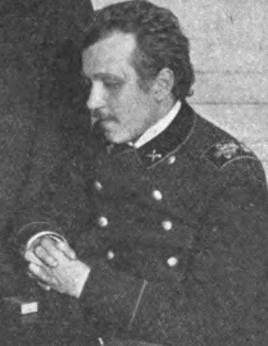
Sergey von Freymann

Sergey von Freymann (Russian: Сергей Николаевич Фрейман; 1882–1946) was a Russian, later Soviet chess master.

In 1906, von Freymann took 2nd, behind Semyon Alapin, in Sankt Petersburg. In 1907, he tied for 6-7th in St Petersburg (Eugene Znosko-Borovsky won). In 1907/08, he took 5th in Lodz (the 5th All-Russian Masters' Tournament). The event was won by Akiba Rubinstein. In 1907/08, he won in St Petersburg. In 1908, he took 2nd, behind Sergey Lebedev, in St Petersburg (Quadrangular). In 1908, he tied for 1st with Karl Wilhelm Rosenkrantz in St Petersburg. In 1909, he took 18th in St Petersburg (Chigorin Memorial). The event was won by Emanuel Lasker and Rubinstein. In 1909, he tied for 2nd-3rd with Abram Rabinovich, behind Rubinstein, in the 6th RUS-ch in Vilna (Wilno, Vilnius). In 1910, he tied for 1st-3rd with Lebedev and Grigory Levenfish in St Petersburg. In 1911, he tied for 2nd-5th in Cologne (Moishe Lowtzky won). In 1911, he tied for 3rd-4th with Levenfish, behind Fyodor Duz-Khotimirsky and Znosko-Borovsky, in St Petersburg. The same year, von Freymann beat Znosko-Borovsky in a match (+5 –3 =10). In 1912, he tied for 6-7th in Abbazia (Opatija). The event was won by Rudolf Spielmann. In 1912, he took 8th in the 7th RUS-ch in Vilna (Rubinstein won). In 1913/14, he tied for 1st-2nd with Peter Romanovsky in St Petersburg. In 1914, he took 12th in St Petersburg (the 8th RUS-ch). The event was won by Alexander Alekhine and Aron Nimzowitsch.

After World War I, von Freymann participated in the USSR and the Soviet Republics of Middle Asia championships. In late 1920s, he moved from Russia to Uzbekistan. In 1924, he tied for 16-17th in Moscow (3rd URS-ch). The event was won by Efim Bogoljubow. In 1925, he took 19th in Leningrad (4th URS-ch, Bogoljubow won). In 1925, von Freymann drew a match with Duz-Chotimirski (+5 –5 =0). In 1927, he tied for 10-12th in Moscow (5th URS-ch). The event was won by Fedor Bohatirchuk and Peter Romanovsky. In 1927, he tied for 1st with Nikolay Rudnev in the Championship of Middle Asia. In 1928, he won (off contest) 2nd Turkmenistan championship. In 1929, he finished 2nd in the 6th URS-ch in Odessa (Verlinsky won). In 1930, he took 6th in Tiflis (Vsevolod Rauzer won).

In 1931, he took 6th in the 2nd UZB-ch (Duz-Chotimirski). Sergey von Freymann won Uzbekistani Chess Championship four times, in 1932, 1934, 1935 and 1937. Meanwhile, he tied for 16-17th at Leningrad 1933 (8th URS-ch). The event was won by Mikhail Botvinnik. In 1934, he won in Tashkent (Championship of Middle Asia). In 1934/35, he took 20th in Leningrad (9th URS-ch). The event was won by Levenfish and Rabinovich. In 1935, he won the second Kazakhstani Chess Championship, held in Alma-Ata. In 1937, he tied for 1st-2nd with Skripkin in the Kyrgyzstani championship. In 1938, he tied for 13-17th in Kiev (URS-ch, semi-final).

After World War II, von Freymann took 4th in the 10th Uzbekistan championship (Abdullaev won) in 1945/46.
