= Ralf Appel =

German chess grandmaster

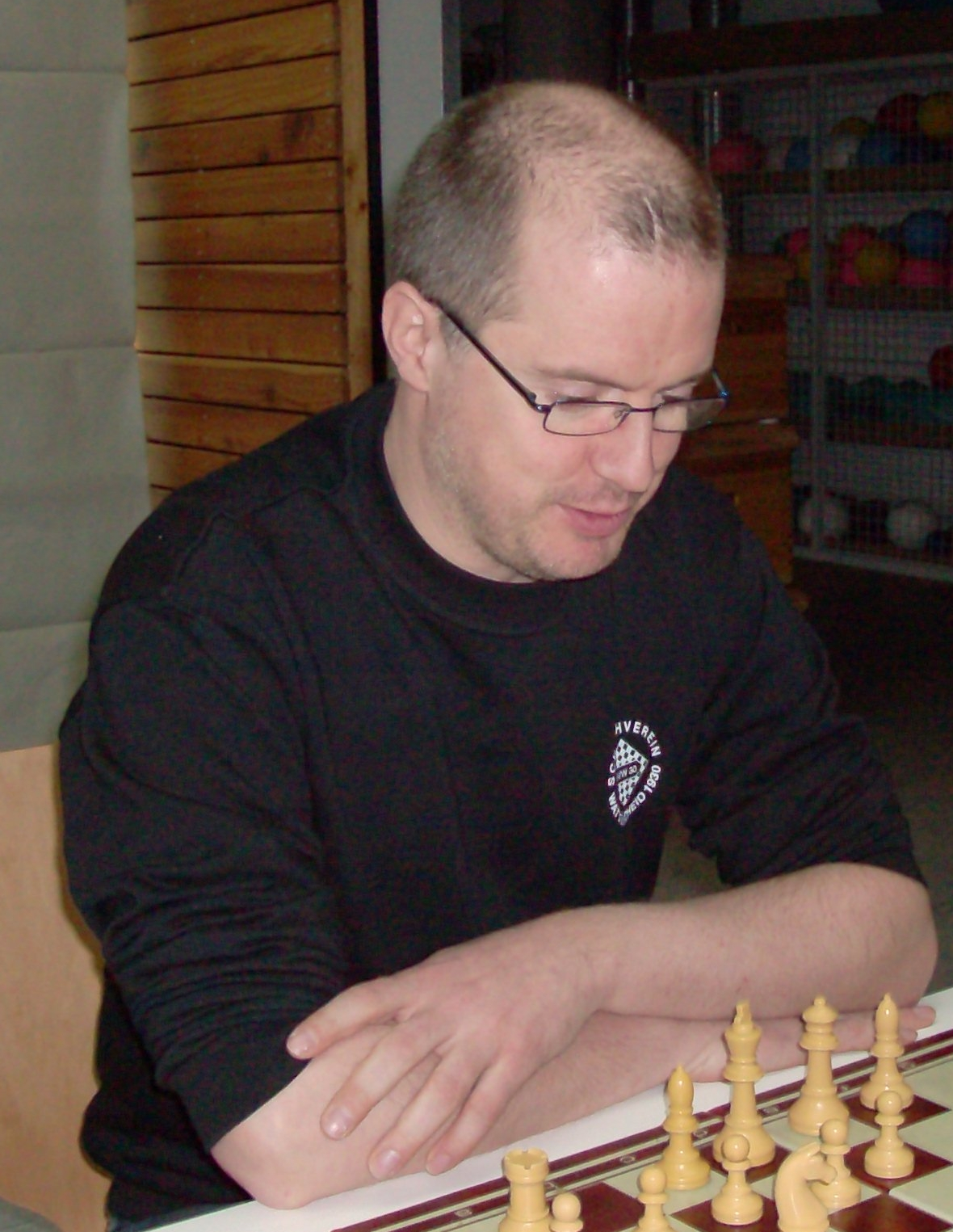

Personal information
- Born: July 18, 1971 (age 54)

Chess career
- Country: Germany
- Title: Grandmaster (2008)
- FIDE rating: 2508 (July 2026)
- Peak rating: 2552 (July 2009)

Ralf Appel (born 18 July 1971) is a German chess grandmaster.
