= Fedor Duz-Khotimirsky =

Soviet chess player (1881–1965)

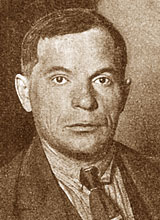
- Duz-Khotimirsky in 1923

Personal information
- Born: September 25, 1881 Mykhailo-Kotsiubynske, Ukraine, Russian Empire
- Died: November 5, 1965 (aged 84) Moscow, Soviet Union

Chess career
- Country: Soviet Union

Fedor (Fyodor) Ivanovich Duz–Khotimirsky (sometimes transliterated Dus-Chotimirski, Khotymirsky etc.; Ukrainian: Фе́дір Іва́нович Дуз-Хотимирський; Russian: Фёдор Дуз-Хотимирский; 25 September 1881, Chernihiv or Moscow – 5 November 1965, Moscow) was a Russian and Soviet Ukrainian chess master. He was one of the organizers of the Kyiv Chess Club.

== Chess career ==
He was born in Mykhailo-Kotsiubynske, a village in today's Chernihiv oblast of Ukraine.

He was a four-time winner of the Kiev championship (1900, 1902, 1903, and 1906). He participated in five Russian championships (All Russian Masters Tournament). In 1901 he took 15th in Moscow (2nd RUS-ch; Mikhail Chigorin won). In 1903, he took 15th in Kiev (3rd RUS-ch; Chigorin won). In 1906, he tied for 8–10th in Sankt Petersburg (4th RUS-ch; Gersz Salwe won). In 1907/08, he tied for 8–9th in Łódź (5th RUS-ch; Akiba Rubinstein won). In 1909, he took 4th in Vilna (Vilnius) (6th RUS-ch; Rubinstein won).

In tournaments, he took 7th at St Petersburg 1901 (Lebedev won). In 1907, he tied for 11–12th in Carlsbad (Karlovy Vary) (Rubinstein won). In 1907 he won, ahead of Benjamin Blumenfeld and Georg Marco, in Moscow. In 1907, he took 3rd in Moscow (Chigorin won). In 1908, he took 4th in Moscow, as (Vladimir Nenarokov won). In 1908, he took 11th in Prague (Oldřich Duras and Carl Schlechter won). In 1908, he drew a match with Frank Marshall (+2 –2 =2) in Warsaw. In 1909, he finished 13th in St Petersburg, but defeated co-tournament winners Emanuel Lasker (the world champion at the time) and Rubinstein in their individual games. In 1910, he took 4th in St Petersburg (Sergey von Freymann, Lebedev and Grigory Levenfish won). In 1910, he tied for 7–8th in Hamburg (17th DSB Kongress; Schlechter won). In 1911, he took 22nd in Carlsbad (Richard Teichmann won). In 1911, he tied for 1st–2nd with Eugene Znosko-Borovsky in St Petersburg. In 1913, he lost both games of an exhibition mini-match to José Raúl Capablanca in St Petersburg.

In 1921, he tied for 7–8th in Moscow (Grigoriev won). In 1923, he tied for 3rd–5th in Petrograd (2nd URS-ch; Peter Romanovsky won). In 1924, he tied for 10–11th in Moscow (3rd URS-ch; Efim Bogoljubow won). In 1925, he took 5th in Leningrad (Bogoljubow won). In 1925, he took 20th in Moscow (international event; Bogoljubow won). In 1925, he tied for 5–7th in Moscow (Sergeev won). In 1927, he tied for 3rd–4th in Moscow (5th URS-ch; Fedor Bohatyrchuk and Romanovsky won). In 1927, he took 2nd, behind Sorokin, in Tiflis (Tbilisi). In 1930, he tied for 3rd–5th in Moscow (Abram Rabinovich won).

In 1931, he won the 2nd Uzbekistani Chess Championship. In 1933, he took 19th in Leningrad (8th URS-ch; Mikhail Botvinnik won). In 1938, he tied for 13–17th in Kiev (URS-ch sf; Vasily Panov won). In June 1941, he played in the semifinals of the Soviet championship in Rostov-on-Don (Rostov-na-Donu), which were interrupted by the Nazi attack on the Soviet Union. In November 1942, he took 15th in Moscow-ch (Vasily Smyslov won). In 1944, he tied for 15–16th in Moscow (URS-ch sf; Alexander Kotov won). After the war got over, he resumed active tournament play despite advanced age. In USSR, he was likely to be the oldest Master-Level player still active. In 1945, he took 14th in Baku (URS-ch sf). In 1946, he tied for 16–17th in Tbilisi (URS-ch sf). In 1947, he tied for 2nd–4th in Yerevan (7th ARM-ch; Igor Bondarevsky won playoff). In 1949, he tied for 14–15th in Vilnius (URS-ch sf).

He was awarded the International Master title in 1950 based on his past achievements.
