= Merab Gagunashvili =

Georgian chess grandmaster (born 1985)

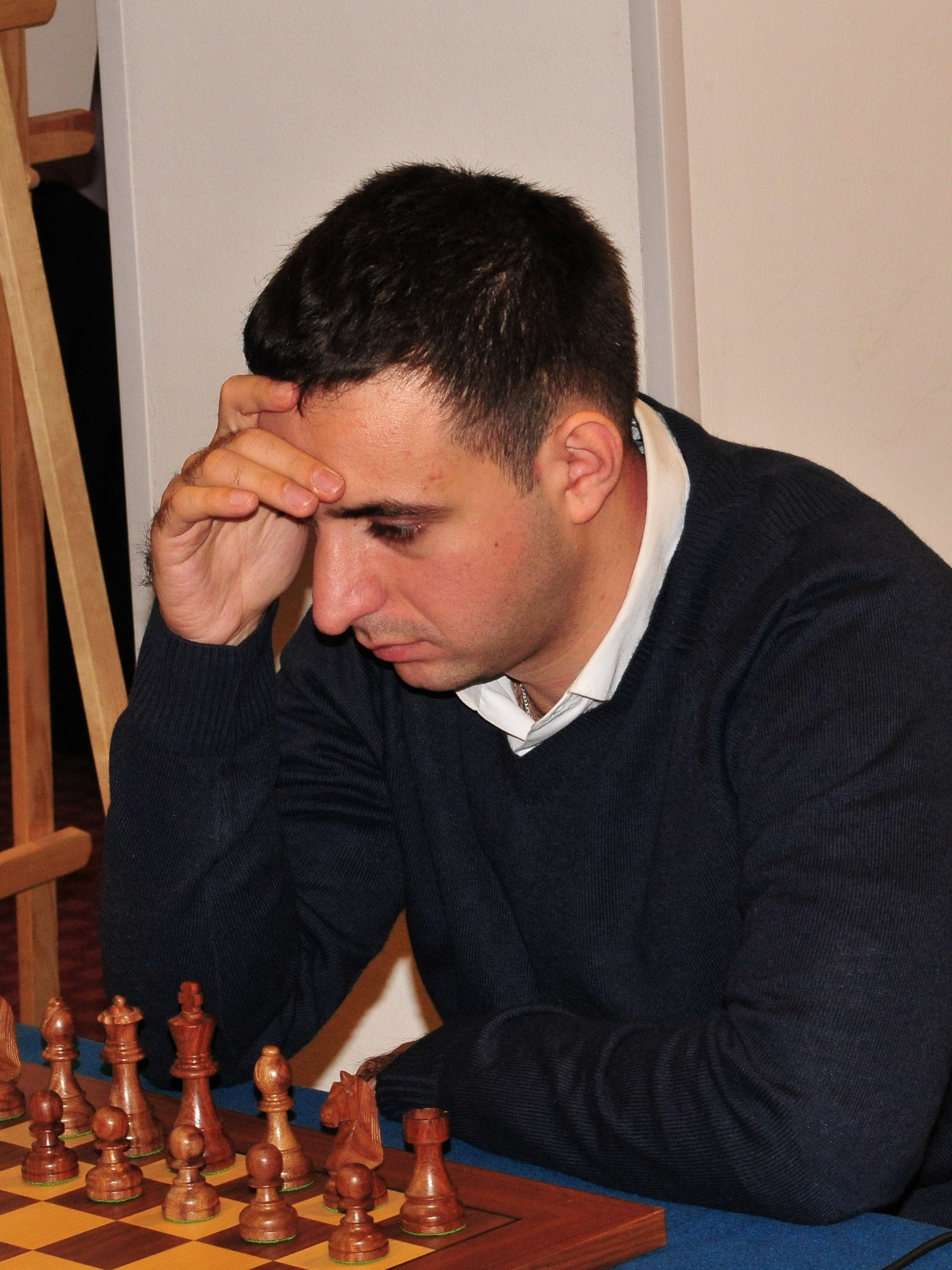
- Merab Gagunashvili, Warsaw 2013

Personal information
- Born: 3 January 1985 (age 41) Tbilisi, Georgian SSR, Soviet Union

Chess career
- Country: Georgia
- Title: Grandmaster (2002)
- FIDE rating: 2520 (July 2026)
- Peak rating: 2625 (April 2007)
- Peak ranking: No. 96 (April 2007)

Merab Gagunashvili (Georgian: მერაბ გაგუნაშვილი; born 3 January 1985) is a Georgian chess grandmaster. He is a two-time Georgian Chess Champion.

== Chess career ==
In 2001, he won the silver medal in the World Junior Chess Championship. He became a grandmaster at the age of 17. Gagunashvili won the 2006/07 Hastings International Chess Congress edging out on tiebreak defending champion Valeriy Neverov, after both players scored 7/9 points. In 2009 he tied for 3rd–8th with Anton Filippov, Elshan Moradiabadi, Vadim Malakhatko, Alexander Shabalov and Niaz Murshed in the Ravana Challenge Tournament in Colombo. In 2010 he won the Tbilisi Municipality Cup. In 2011 he tied for 1st–4th with Gadir Guseinov, Evgeny Gleizerov and Sergei Tiviakov in the 19th Fajr Open Chess Tournament.

He took part in the FIDE World Chess Championship 2004, but was knocked out in the first round by Smbat Lputian. He played for Georgia in the Chess Olympiads of 2002, 2004, 2006 and 2010.

Gagunashvili has stated his favourite players were Bobby Fischer and Garry Kasparov because "they both brought something new to chess."
