= Dmitry Chuprov =

Russian chess grandmaster (1978–2012)

Personal information
- Born: May 10, 1978 Kurgan, Kurgan Oblast, Russian SFSR, Soviet Union
- Died: September 14, 2012 (aged 34) Kurgan, Kurgan Oblast, Russia

Chess career
- Title: Grandmaster (2008)
- Peak rating: 2596 (January 2008)

Dmitry Mikhailovich Chuprov (Russian: Дмитрий Михайлович Чупров; 10 May 1978 – 14 September 2012) was a Russian chess grandmaster (GM). He achieved his peak international classical rating of 2596 in early 2008, ranking him among the upper tier of competitive Russian players during his active career.

== Early life and youth achievements ==
Chuprov was born in Kurgan and began his chess training under the tutelage of prominent coach Alexey Vladimirovich Pugachev. He emerged as one of Russia's top young talents in the early post-Soviet era.

In 1993, he won the Russian Youth Chess Championship in the under-16 category. That same year, he represented the Russian national youth team at the World Children's Chess Olympiad, securing a gold medal.

In 1994, Chuprov achieved a major international breakthrough by winning first prize at the prestigious Kremlin Cup youth tournament. During the semi-final and final rounds of the tournament, he defeated future world elite grandmasters Péter Lékó and Sergei Movsesian. In 1995, he won the Russian Youth Chess Championship in the under-18 category and anchored the Russian youth national team on board one at the World Youth Chess Olympiad, leading the team to victory.

== Chess career ==
Born in Kurgan, Chuprov developed into a strong positional competitor in the post-Soviet Russian chess circuit. He was awarded the International Master (IM) title by FIDE in 1996. Over the following decade, he established himself through strong performances in high-level open tournaments and national events.

Chuprov gained widespread recognition following a series of strong results in the early-to-mid 2000s, including a notable individual victory over elite grandmaster Sergei Rublevsky. In 2008, following consistent performances across deep international fields—including the Aeroflot Open, Voronezh Open, and the Russian Championship Higher League—FIDE officially ratified his Grandmaster title.

He reached his career-highest Elo rating of 2596 in January 2008. He continued competing at a high level across classical, rapid, and blitz disciplines.

== Later life and death ==
In 2011, Chuprov returned to his hometown of Kurgan. He transitioned into coaching, working as an instructor at the Regional Children and Youth Sports School, where he trained young regional talents.

Chuprov died suddenly on 14 September 2012 at the age of 34. The Russian Chess Federation published an official statement expressing condolences to the chess community. He was buried at the Novoye Ryabkovskoye Cemetery in Kurgan.
