= Saidali Iuldachev =

Uzbekistani chess grandmaster (born 1968)

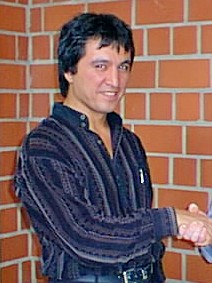
- Saidali Iuldashev, Recklinghausen 1998

Personal information
- Born: January 31, 1968 (age 58) Uzbek Soviet Socialist Republic, USSR

Chess career
- Country: Uzbekistan
- Title: Grandmaster (1996)
- Peak rating: 2559 (January 2004)

Saidali Iuldachev (Uzbek: Saidali Yo‘ldoshev; born January 31, 1968) is an Uzbekistani chess Grandmaster (1997).

He won Uzbekistani Chess Championship in 1993 and 2003. In 2004 he tied for 2nd–4th with Praveen Thipsay and Chakkravarthy Deepan in the Piloo Mody International Open in Lucknow and tied for first with Maxim Sorokin in the Murzagaliev Memorial in Uralsk, Kazakhstan. In 2009 he tied for 5th–10th with Chakkravarthy Deepan, Georgy Timoshenko, Sundar Shyam, Andrei Deviatkin and Shukhrat Safin in the Mumbai Mayor Cup.

Iuldachev played for Uzbekistan in the Chess Olympiads of 1992, 1996, 1998, 2002, 2004 and 2008. He took part in the FIDE World Chess Championship 2002, but was knocked out in the first round by Zurab Azmaiparashvili. In the May 2010 FIDE list, he has an Elo rating of 2511, making him Uzbekistan's number four.

== Notable games ==
- Mikhail Krasenkow vs Saidali Iuldachev, 34th Olympiad 2000, Spanish Game: General (C65), 0-1
- Saidali Iuldachev vs Alexander Hilario Ta Fier, 37th Chess Olympiad 2006, Sicilian Defense: Closed Variation (B23), 1-0
