= Andrey Kvon =

Uzbekistani chess grandmaster (born 1989)

Personal information
- Born: April 16, 1989 (age 37) Tashkent, Uzbek SSR

Chess career
- Country: Uzbekistan
- Title: Grandmaster (2018)
- FIDE rating: 2513 (July 2026)
- Peak rating: 2527 (December 2021)

Andrey Valerievich Kvon is an Uzbekistani chess grandmaster and coach.

== Career ==
In 2009, he tied for first with grandmaster Marat Dzhumaev in the Tashkent Mayor's Cup.

He met all of the requirements to become a Grandmaster in 2017, achieving his norms at the:

- 40th Chess Olympiad in September 2012. This was counted as two norms.
- Xtracon Chess Open in July 2017

He is a chess coach living in Singapore. He has coached Singaporean chess prodigies Ashwath Kaushik and Siddharth Jagadeesh, and was the captain of Singapore’s Olympiad team in 2022.
