= Sergey Zagrebelny =

Uzbekistani chess grandmaster (born 1965)

Personal information
- Born: April 9, 1965 (age 61) Uzbek Soviet Socialist Republic, USSR

Chess career
- Country: Uzbekistan
- Title: Grandmaster (1993)
- FIDE rating: 2485 (July 2026)
- Peak rating: 2540 (July 2003)

Sergey Zagrebelny (Russian: Сергей Загребельный; born April 9, 1965) is an Uzbekistani chess Grandmaster (1993).

== Career ==
In 1988 and 1990 he won the Uzbekistani Chess Championship. In 1992, as a member of the Uzbekistan national team, he won two silver medals (team and individual on board four) in the 30th Chess Olympiad. He also played for Uzbekistan in the Chess Olympiads of 1994, 1996, 1998, 2000, 2002, in the World Team Chess Championship of 1993 and in the Asian Team Chess Championships of 1993 and 1995. In 1998, Zagrebelny tied for 4–7th with Praveen Thipsay, Mohamad Al-Modiahki and Amanmurad Kakageldyev in the Asian Chess Championship in Tehran. Zagrebelny won the Abu Dhabi Masters tournament in 2001. He tied for first with Alexander Huzman, Victor Mikhalevski and Vadim Milov in Ashdod 2003, with Zhou Jianchao and Arsen Yegiazarian in the A2 tournament of the 2005 Aeroflot Open and with Vladimir Baklan, Aleksander Delchev and Adam Horvath in Balaguer 2005.

Zagrebelny is regularly active as a live-online commentator of major chess events broadcast on the Russian chess platform ChessPro.
