= Igor Zakharevich =

Russian chess grandmaster (1963–2008)

Igor Zakharevich (July 14, 1963 – August 10, 2008) was a Russian chess Grandmaster and a chess coach. In October 2005 he tied for 1st–2nd with Roman Ovetchkin in the Chigorin Memorial.
