= J. Deepan Chakkravarthy =

Indian chess grandmaster (born 1987)

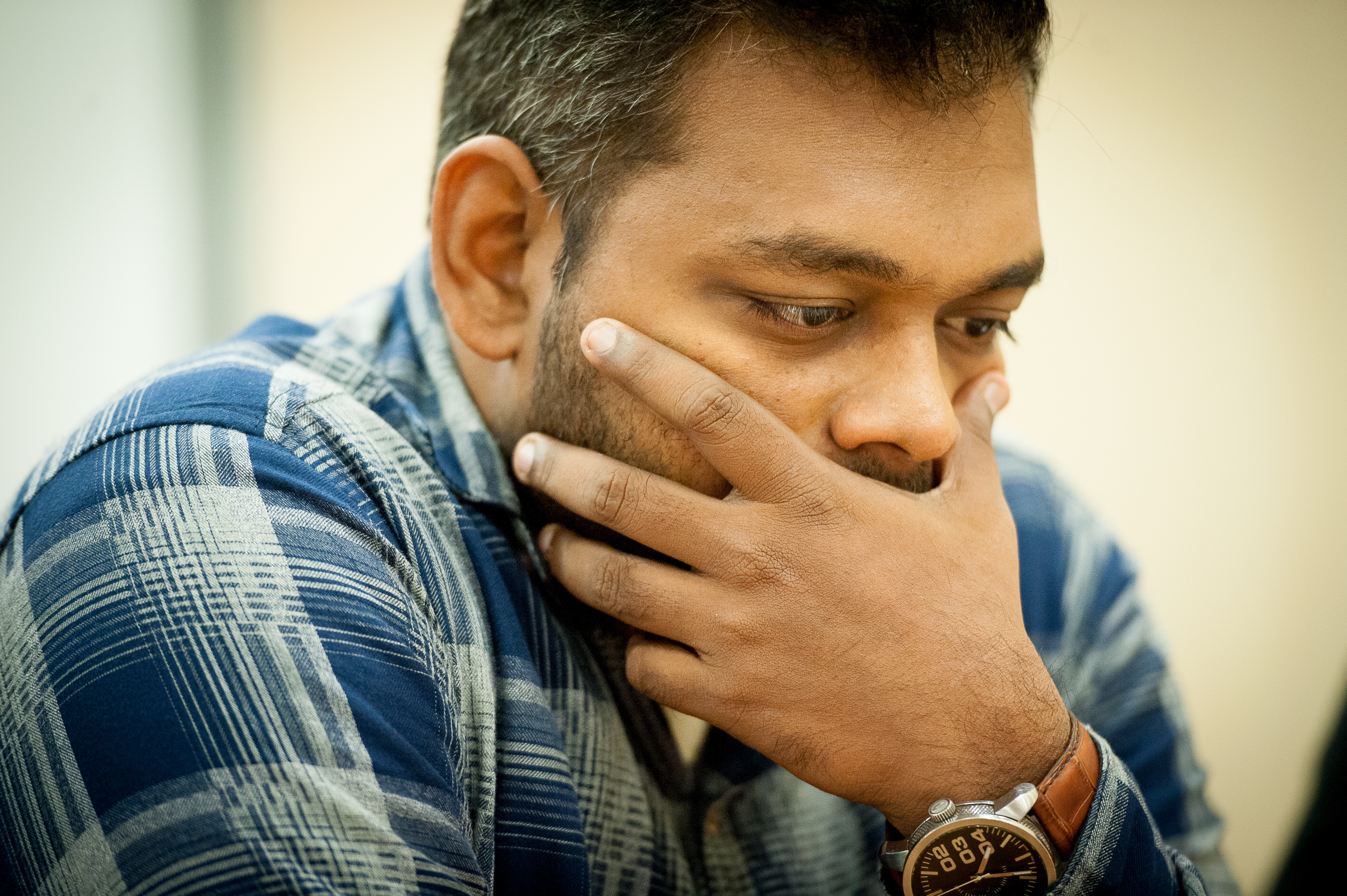
- Chakkravarthy in 2016

Personal information
- Born: 3 June 1987 (age 39) Madurai, Tamil Nadu, India

Chess career
- Country: India
- Title: Grandmaster (2006)
- Peak rating: 2557 (May 2019)

J. Deepan Chakkravarthy (born 3 June 1987) is an Indian chess player. He was awarded the title Grandmaster by FIDE in 2006.

Born in Madurai, Deepan Chakkravarthy won the Asian Junior Chess Championship in 2002. In the 2004 edition he finished second to S. Arun Prasad on tiebreak score. In the same year he tied for 2nd–4th with Praveen Thipsay and Saidali Iuldachev in the Piloo Mody International Open in Lucknow. Deepan Chakkravarthy was part of the Indian chess team at the 2007 Asian Indoor Games that took the gold medal in the rapid chess event and silver in the standard event.
