= Georgy Agzamov =

Soviet chess grandmaster (1954–1986)

Personal information
- Born: Georgy Tadzhikhanovich Agzamov; September 6, 1954 Olmaliq, Tashkent Region, Uzbek SSR, Soviet Union
- Died: August 27, 1986 (aged 31) Sevastopol, Ukrainian SSR, Soviet Union

Chess career
- Country: Soviet Union
- Title: Grandmaster (1984)
- Peak rating: 2590 (January 1985)
- Peak ranking: No. 14 (January 1985)

Georgy Tadzhikhanovich Agzamov (September 6, 1954, Tashkent – August 27, 1986, Sevastopol) was a Soviet chess Grandmaster, the first from Central Asia. He became an International Master in 1982 and was awarded the Grandmaster title in 1984.

== Career ==
In 1966, at the age of 12, he was the chess champion of his town of Almalyk (Olmaliq) in the province of Tashkent of central Uzbekistan.

In 1971, he took 2nd place in the USSR Junior Chess Championship, held in Riga.

In 1973, he played in his first Uzbekistani chess championship. He won the event in 1976 and 1981.

He was the first Grandmaster from Uzbekistan in 1984.

He was a philologist.

Best results include first place at Belgrade 1982; 1st at Vršac 1983; 1st at Sochi 1984; 1st at Tashkent 1984; 1st at Bogotá 1984; 2nd at Potsdam 1985; 1st at Calcutta 1986.

In 1986, after finishing a chess tournament in Sevastopol, Crimea, he died in an accident while hiking, when he fell off a cliff and became trapped between two rocks. Passersby heard his cries for help, but he was too far down, and by the time rescue crews reached him, it was too late.

His highest Elo chess rating was 2590 on the January 1, 1985 FIDE rating list.

Since 2007, an annual open chess tournament has been held in Tashkent in his memory.
