= List of Russian chess players =

This list of Russian chess players lists people from Russia and the Russian Empire who are primarily known as chess players. The majority of these people are chess grandmasters.

== A ==
- Anna Akhsharumova (born 1957)
- Semyon Alapin (1856–1923)
- Vladimir Alatortsev (1909–1987)
- Lev Alburt (born 1945)
- Alexander Alekhine (1892–1946), world champion
- Alexei Alekhine (1888–1939)
- Evgeny Alekseev (born 1985)
- Dmitry Andreikin (born 1990)
- Vladimir Antoshin (1929–1994)
- Valentin Arbakov (1952–2004)
- Lev Aronin (1920–1983)
- Vladislav Artemiev (born 1998)
- Andreas Ascharin (1843–1896)
- Konstantin Aseev (1960–2004)
- Ekaterina Atalik (born 1982)
- Yuri Averbakh (1922–2022)

== B ==
- Alexander Baburin (born 1967)
- Vladimir Bagirov (1936–2000)
- Yuri Balashov (born 1949)
- Evgeny Bareev (born 1966)
- Anjelina Belakovskaia (born 1969)
- Liudmila Belavenets (1940–2021)
- Sergey Belavenets (1910–1942)
- Vladimir Belov (born 1984)
- Benjamin Blumenfeld (1884–1947)
- Boris Blumin (1907–1998)
- Dmitry Bocharov (born 1982)
- Efim Bogoljubov (1889–1952)
- Isaac Boleslavsky (1919–1977)
- Igor Bondarevsky (1913–1979)
- Valentina Borisenko (1920–1993)
- Mikhail Botvinnik (1911–1995), world champion
- David Bronstein (1924–2006)
- Vladimir Burmakin (born 1967)
- Anna Burtasova (born 1987)
- Elisabeth Bykova (1913–1989)

== C ==
- Valery Chekhov (born 1955)
- Vitaly Chekhover (1908–1965)
- Alexander Cherepkov (1920–2009)
- Irving Chernev (1900–1981)
- Alexander Cherniaev (born 1969)
- Alexander Chernin (born 1960)
- Konstantin Chernyshov (born 1967)
- Mikhail Chigorin (1850–1908)
- Vladimir Chuchelov (born 1969)

== D ==
- Rustem Dautov (born 1965)
- Yelena Dembo (born 1983)
- Andrei Deviatkin (born 1980)
- Maxim Dlugy (born 1966)
- Yosef Dobkin (1909–1977)
- Yury Dokhoian (1964–2021)
- Sergey Dolmatov (born 1959)
- Elena Donaldson (1957–2012)
- Iosif Dorfman (born 1952)
- Alexey Dreev (born 1969)
- Daniil Dubov (born 1996)
- Fedor Duz-Khotimirsky (1879–1965)
- Mark Dvoretsky (1947–2016)
- Semen Dvoirys (born 1958)
- Roman Dzindzichashvili (born 1944)

== E ==
- Vladimir Epishin (born 1965)
- Yakov Estrin (1923–1987)

== F ==
- Raphael Falk (1856–1913)
- Alexei Fedorov (born 1972)
- Vladimir Fedoseev (born 1995)
- Salo Flohr (1908–1983)
- Sergey von Freymann (1882–1946)
- Semyon Furman (1920–1978)

== G ==
- Aleksandr Galkin (born 1979)
- Alisa Galliamova (born 1972)
- Viktor Gavrikov (1957–2016)
- Boris Gelfand (born 1968)
- Efim Geller (1925–1998)
- Edward Gerstenfeld (1915–1943)
- Anish Giri (born 1994)
- Evgeny Gleizerov (born 1963)
- Igor Glek (born 1961)
- Leonid Gofshtein (1953–2015)
- Alexander Goldin (born 1965)
- Vitali Golod (born 1971)
- Aleksei Goncharov (1879–1913)
- Solomon Gotthilf (1903–1967)
- Boris Grachev (born 1984)
- Nikolay Grigoriev (1895–1935)
- Alexander Grischuk (born 1983)
- Eduard Gufeld (1936–2002)
- Boris Gulko (born 1947)
- Dmitry Gurevich (born 1956)

== H ==
- Alexander Halprin (1868–1921)
- Grigory Helbach (1863–1930)
- Alexander Huzman (born 1962)

== I ==
- Ildar Ibragimov (born 1967)
- Bella Igla (born 1985)
- Alexander Ilyin-Zhenevsky (1894–1941)
- Ernesto Inarkiev (born 1985)
- Alexander Ivanov (born 1956)
- Igor Vasilyevich Ivanov (1947–2005)

== J ==
- Carl Jaenisch (1813–1872)
- Charles Jaffe (1883–1941)
- Dmitry Jakovenko (born 1983)
- Lora Jakovleva (born 1932)

== K ==
- Victor Kahn (1889–1971)
- Gregory Kaidanov (born 1959)
- Gata Kamsky (born 1974)
- Ilya Kan (1909–1978)
- Albert Kapengut (born 1944)
- Mona May Karff (1914–1998)
- Sergey Karjakin (born 1990)
- Anatoly Karpov (born 1951), world champion
- Garry Kasparov (born 1963), world champion
- Genrikh Kasparyan (1910–1995)
- Alexander Khalifman (born 1966)
- Semen Khanin (born 1999)
- Andrei Kharlov (1968–2014)
- Igor Khenkin (born 1968)
- Denis Khismatullin (born 1984)
- Ratmir Kholmov (1925–2006)
- Natalia Khoudgarian (born 1975)
- R.K. Kieseritzky (1870-?)
- Viktor Knorre (1840–1919)
- Mikhail Kobalia (born 1978)
- Dmitry Kokarev (born 1982)
- Alexander Kochyev (born 1956)
- Alexander Konstantinopolsky (1910–1990)
- Nikolai Kopilov (1919–1995)
- Viktor Korchnoi (1931–2016)
- Alexey Korotylev (born 1977)
- Nadezhda Kosintseva (born 1985)
- Tatiana Kosintseva (born 1986)
- Alexandra Kosteniuk (born 1984)
- Alexander Kotov (1913–1981)
- Boris Koyalovich (1867–1941)
- Valentina Kozlovskaya (born 1938)
- Vladimir Kramnik (born 1975), world champion
- Michał Krasenkow (born 1963)
- Boris Kreiman (born 1976)
- Ljuba Kristol (born 1944)
- Stanislav Kriventsov (born 1973)
- Nikolai Krogius (1930–2022)
- Arvid Kubbel (1889–1938)
- Leonid Kubbel (1891–1942)
- Sergey Kudrin (born 1959)
- Igor Kurnosov (1985–2013)
- Alla Kushnir (1941–2013)

== L ==
- Konstantin Landa (1972–2022)
- Emanuel Lasker (1868–1941, was born German but renounce German citizenship for Soviet citizenship later in life)
- Alexander Lastin (1976–2015)
- Anatoly Lein (1931–2018)
- Isaac Lipnitsky (1923–1959)
- Grigory Levenfish (1889–1961)
- Irina Levitina (born 1954)
- Stepan Levitsky (1876–1924)
- Vladimir Liberzon (1937–1996)
- Andor Lilienthal (1911–2010)
- Georgy Lisitsin (1909–1972)
- Marta Litinskaya-Shul (born 1949)
- Andrey Lukin (born 1948)
- Anatoly Lutikov (1933–1989)
- Igor Lysyj (born 1987)

== M ==
- Sergey Makarichev (born 1953)
- Vladimir Makogonov (1904–1993)
- Vladimir Malakhov (born 1980)
- Boris Maliutin (1883–1920)
- Maria Manakova (born 1974)
- Svetlana Matveeva (born 1969)
- Isaak Mazel (1911–1943)
- Olga Menchik (1908–1946)
- Vera Menchik (1906–1944)
- Vadim Milov (born 1972)
- Leopold Mitrofanov (1932–1992)
- Abram Model (1896–1976)
- Alexander Morozevich (born 1977)
- Alexander Motylev (born 1979)
- Jacob Murey (born 1941)

== N ==
- Evgeniy Najer (born 1977)
- Vera Nebolsina (born 1989)
- Vladimir Nenarokov (1880–1953)
- Ian Nepomniachtchi (born 1990)
- Rashid Nezhmetdinov (1912–1974)
- Nikolay Novotelnov (1911–2006)

== O ==
- Alexandra Obolentseva (born 2001)

== P ==
- Alexander Panchenko (1953–2009)
- Vasily Panov (1908–1976)
- Vasily Papin (born 1988)
- Nikolay Pavlov-Pianov
- Alexander Petrov (1774–1867)
- Vladimirs Petrovs (1907–1943)
- Evgeny Pigusov (born 1961)
- Igor Platonov (1934–1994)
- Natalia Pogonina (born 1985)
- Vladimir Potkin (Russia, born 1982)
- Lev Polugaevsky (1934–1995)
- Peter Potemkine (1886–1926)
- Svetlana Prudnikova (born 1967)
- Lev Psakhis (born 1958)

== R ==
- Abram Rabinovich (1878–1943)
- Ilya Rabinovich (1891–1942)
- Viacheslav Ragozin (1908–1962)
- Maurice Raizman (1905–1974)
- Nukhim Rashkovsky (1946–2023)
- Vsevolod Rauzer (1908–1941)
- Yuri Razuvayev (1945–2012)
- Alexander Riazantsev (born 1985)
- Nikolai Riumin (1908–1942)
- Michael Roiz (born 1983)
- Oleg Romanishin (born 1952)
- Alexander Romanovsky (1880–1943)
- Peter Romanovsky (1892–1964)
- Karl Wilhelm Rosenkrantz (1876–1942)
- Solomon Rosenthal (1890–1955)
- Nicolas Rossolimo (1910–1975)
- Sergei Rublevsky (born 1974)
- Olga Rubtsova (1909–1994)
- Lyudmila Rudenko (1904–1986)
- Nikoly Rudnev (1895–1944)

== S ==
- Peter Alexandrovich Saburov (1835–1918)
- Peter Petrovich Saburov (1880–1932)
- Nikolai Sahzin (born 1988)
- Konstantin Sakaev (born 1974)
- Yuri Sakharov (1922–1981)
- Valery Salov (born 1964)
- Grigory Sanakoev (1935–2021)
- Vladimir Savon (1940–2005)
- Emanuel Schiffers (1850–1904)
- Alexey Selezniev (1888–1967)
- Lidia Semenova (born 1951)
- Aleksandr Sergeyev (1897–1970)
- Gregory Serper (born 1969)
- Yuri Shabanov (1937–2010)
- Alexander Shakarov (born 1948)
- Leonid Shamkovich (1923–2005)
- Andrey Shariyazdanov (born 1976)
- Andrei Shchekachev (born 1972)
- Miron Sher (1952–2020)
- Sergei Shipov (born 1966)
- Ilya Shumov (1819–1881)
- Vladimir Simagin (1919–1968)
- Sergey Smagin (born 1958)
- Pavel Smirnov (born 1982)
- Vasily Smyslov (1921–2010), world champion
- Vasily Osipovich Smyslov (1881–1943)
- Andrei Sokolov (born 1963)
- Alexander Solovtsov (1847–1923)
- Evgeniy Solozhenkin (born 1966)
- Maxim Sorokin (1968–2007)
- Genna Sosonko (born 1943)
- Victor Soultanbeieff (1895–1972)
- Vladimir Sournin (1875–1942)
- Boris Spassky (1937–2025), world champion
- Leonid Stein (1934–1973)
- Mark Stolberg (1922–1943)
- Alexey Suetin (1926–2001)
- Olga Sukhareva (born 1984)
- Emil Sutovsky (born 1977)
- Peter Svidler (born 1976)
- Evgeny Sveshnikov (1950–2021)

== T ==
- Mark Taimanov (1926–2016)
- Mikhail Tal (1936–1992), world champion
- Artyom Timofeev (born 1985)
- Sergei Tiviakov (born 1973)
- Vladislav Tkachiev (born 1973)
- Alexander Tolush (1910–1969)
- Evgeny Tomashevsky (born 1987)
- Pavel Tregubov (born 1971)
- Mark Tseitlin (1943–2022)
- Mikhail Tseitlin (born 1947)
- Vitaly Tseshkovsky (1944–2011)
- Vladimir Tukmakov (born 1946)
- Maxim Turov (born 1979)
- Olga Semenova Tyan-Shanskaya (1911–1970)

== U ==
- Mikhail Ulibin (born 1971)
- Mikhail Umansky (1952–2010)
- Artem Uskov (born 2010)

== V ==
- Samuil Vainshtein (1894–1942)
- Evgeni Vasiukov (1933–2018)
- Gavriil Veresov (1912–1979)
- Boris Verlinsky (1888–1950)
- Yakov Vilner (1899–1931)
- Nikita Vitiugov (born 1987)
- Sergey Volkov (born 1974)
- Alexander Volzhin (born 1971)
- Evgeny Vladimirov (born 1957)
- Larissa Volpert (1926–2017)
- Konstantin Vygodchikov (1892–1941)
- Alexey Vyzmanavin (1960–2000)

== Y ==
- Yuri Yakovich (born 1962)
- Lora Yakovleva (born 1932)
- Leonid Yudasin (born 1959)
- Mikhail Yudovich (1911–1987)
- Peter Yurdansky (1891–1937)
- Artur Yusupov (born 1960)

== Z ==
- Vladimir Zagorovsky (1925–1994)
- Alexander Zaitsev (1935–1971)
- Igor Zaitsev (born 1938)
- Viacheslav Zakhartsov (born 1968)
- Tatiana Zatulovskaya (1935–2017)
- Ivan Zemlyanskii (born 2010)
- Eugene Znosko-Borovsky (1884–1954)
- Nikolai Zubarev (1894–1951)
- Vadim Zvjaginsev (born 1976)
- Kira Zvorykina (1919–2014)

== See also ==
- List of chess players
- List of chess grandmasters
