= 1979 USSR Chess Championship =

Soviet chess tournament

47th USSR Chess Championship
- Location: Minsk

Champion
- Efim Geller

The 1979 Soviet Chess Championship was the 47th edition of USSR Chess Championship. Held from 29 November to 27 December 1979 in Minsk. The tournament was won by Efim Geller. He won it at the age of 54 and was the oldest player ever to have won the Championship, and did so in a field where young players abounded as never before. The qualifying tournaments took place in Bălți and Bishkek.

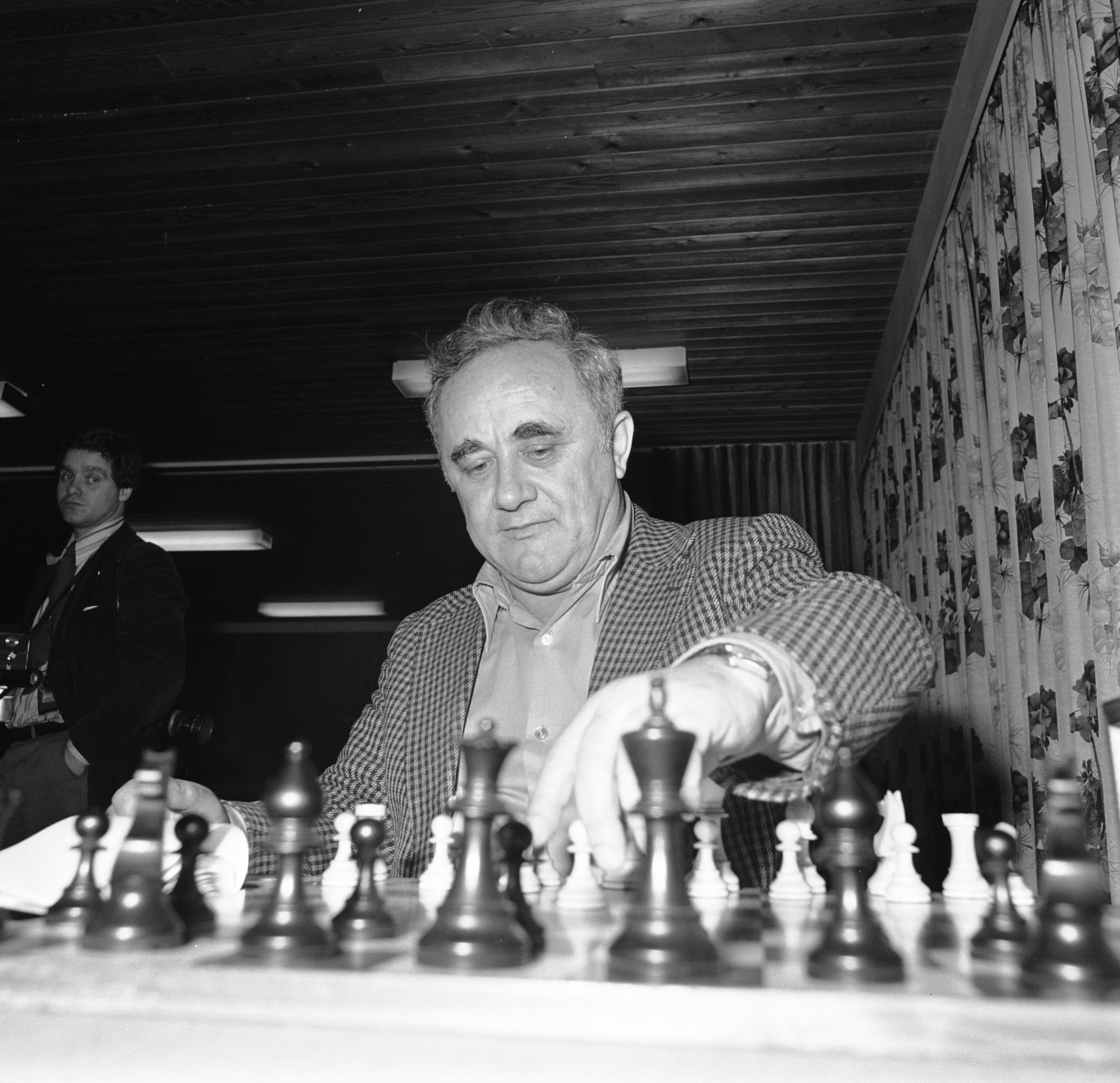
Efim Geller

== Qualifying ==
=== Swiss Qualifying ===
The Swiss Qualifying was held in Bălți from 8-28 August 1979 with 62 players. Nukhim Rashkovsky won gaining a direct promotion to the final.

=== First League ===
The top six qualified for the final.

Bishkek, 2-29 October 1979
	Player	Rating	1	2	3	4	5	6	7	8	9	10	11	12	13	14	15	16	17	18	Total
1	(Soviet Union) Sergey Dolmatov	2495	-	0	½	½	1	0	½	0	½	1	1	1	½	½	1	1	1	1	11
2	(Soviet Union) Sergey Makarichev	2500	1	-	½	0	½	½	½	½	½	½	½	1	½	½	1	1	½	1	10½
3	(Soviet Union) Yuri Razuvaev	2470	½	½	-	½	½	½	½	½	½	½	½	1	½	½	1	½	1	1	10½
4	(Soviet Union) Konstantin Lerner	2475	½	1	½	-	½	1	½	0	1	½	½	0	1	1	½	1	½	0	10
5	(Soviet Union) Yuri Anikaev	2455	0	½	½	½	-	½	½	1	½	½	1	0	½	1	½	½	1	1	10
6	(Soviet Union) Artur Yusupov	2490	1	½	½	0	½	-	1	½	1	½	½	½	½	0	½	1	½	½	9½
7	(Soviet Union) Vladimir Tukmakov	2575	½	½	½	½	½	0	-	1	½	½	0	1	1	1	0	½	0	1	9
8	(Soviet Union) Alexander Ivanov		1	½	½	1	0	½	0	-	0	½	½	1	½	0	½	½	1	1	9
9	(Soviet Union) Gennadij Timoscenko	2530	½	½	½	0	½	0	½	1	-	½	1	½	0	½	1	½	1	½	9
10	(Soviet Union) Alexander Kochyev	2545	0	½	½	½	½	½	½	½	½	-	0	0	½	1	½	1	1	1	9
11	(Soviet Union) Karen Grigorian	2480	0	½	½	½	0	½	1	½	0	1	-	0	½	½	½	1	1	1	9
12	(Soviet Union) Lev Psakhis	2480	0	0	0	1	1	½	0	0	½	1	1	-	½	1	½	0	½	1	8½
13	(Soviet Union) Vladimir Bagirov	2545	½	½	½	0	½	½	0	½	1	½	½	½	-	0	½	1	½	1	8½
14	(Soviet Union) Adrian Mikhalchishin	2480	½	½	½	0	0	1	0	1	½	0	½	0	1	-	0	½	1	1	8
15	(Soviet Union) Leonid Yurtaev		0	0	0	½	½	½	1	½	0	½	½	½	½	1	-	½	0	0	6½
16	(Soviet Union) Fikret Sideifzade	2320	0	0	½	0	½	0	½	½	½	0	0	1	0	½	½	-	½	0	5
17	(Soviet Union) Alvis Vītoliņš	2430	0	½	0	½	0	½	1	0	0	0	0	½	½	0	1	½	-	0	5
18	(Soviet Union) Smbat Lputian		0	0	0	1	0	½	0	0	½	0	0	0	0	0	1	1	1	-	5

== Final ==
The position after 11 rounds was exciting with Balashov, Geller, Kasparov, Kupreichik and Yusupov all sharing the lead on seven points. However, Geller finished like an express train. He had begun with seven draws before he won in rounds 8, 10, 11, 12, 14 and 15. Tal's result was catastrophic, and lost him 40 rating points. His poor form was largely due, according to chief judge Flohr in the bulletin, to the fact that he could not resist a wave of influenza which other participants threw off without too much difficulty.

47th USSR Chess Championship
	Player	Rating	1	2	3	4	5	6	7	8	9	10	11	12	13	14	15	16	17	18	Total
1	(Soviet Union) Efim Geller	2550	-	½	½	½	½	½	½	½	1	½	1	1	1	½	½	½	1	1	11½
2	(Soviet Union) Artur Yusupov	2490	½	-	0	½	½	1	1	1	½	½	½	½	1	1	½	1	½	0	10½
3	(Soviet Union) Garry Kasparov		½	1	-	½	½	1	1	1	0	½	0	½	½	½	1	1	0	½	10
4	(Soviet Union) Yuri Balashov	2600	½	½	½	-	½	½	½	½	½	½	½	½	1	½	½	½	1	1	10
5	(Soviet Union) Sergey Makarichev	2500	½	½	½	½	-	½	1	0	1	½	0	½	½	½	1	½	½	1	9½
6	(Soviet Union) Tamaz Giorgadze	2535	½	0	0	½	½	-	1	1	½	½	0	1	0	1	1	½	½	1	9½
7	(Soviet Union) Viktor Kupreichik	2365	½	0	0	½	0	0	-	1	1	1	½	1	1	½	½	0	1	1	9½
8	(Soviet Union) Rafael Vaganian	2570	½	0	0	½	1	0	0	-	1	½	½	0	1	1	½	1	1	½	9
9	(Soviet Union) Konstantin Lerner	2475	0	½	1	½	0	½	0	0	-	½	1	½	½	½	1	1	½	½	8½
10	(Soviet Union) Nukhim Rashkovsky	2500	½	½	½	½	½	½	0	½	½	-	1	½	½	½	0	½	½	½	8
11	(Soviet Union) Alexander Beliavsky	2595	0	½	1	½	1	1	½	½	0	0	-	½	0	0	0	1	1	½	8
12	(Soviet Union) Yuri Razuvaev	2470	0	½	½	½	½	0	0	1	½	½	½	-	½	½	1	½	½	½	8
13	(Soviet Union) Oleg Romanishin	2560	0	0	½	0	½	1	0	0	½	½	1	½	-	1	1	½	0	1	8
14	(Soviet Union) Mikhail Tal	2615	½	0	½	½	½	0	½	0	½	½	1	½	0	-	½	0	1	1	7½
15	(Soviet Union) Sergey Dolmatov	2495	½	½	0	½	0	0	½	½	0	1	1	0	0	½	-	1	1	½	7½
16	(Soviet Union) Evgeny Sveshnikov	2545	½	0	0	½	½	½	1	0	0	½	0	½	½	1	0	-	1	½	7
17	(Soviet Union) Yuri Anikaev	2455	0	½	1	0	½	½	0	0	½	½	0	½	1	0	0	0	-	½	5½
18	(Soviet Union) Vitaly Tseshkovsky	2560	0	1	½	0	0	0	0	½	½	½	½	½	0	0	½	½	½	-	5½
