= Moscow City Chess Championship =

Russian chess tournament

This is a list of the winners of the Moscow City Chess Championship from 1899 to date. From 1921 to 1924 Nikolai Grigoriev voluntarily defended his title in matches against other challengers.

Year	Winner
1899 match	Alexander Solovtsov
1900	Vladimir Nenarokov
1901	Aleksei Goncharov & Raphael Falk
1902	Vladimir A. Boyarkov
1908	Vladimir Nenarokov
1909	Aleksei Goncharov
1911	Ossip Bernstein
1913 match	Peter Yurdansky
1919–20	Alexander Alekhine
1920–21	Josef Cukierman
1921–22	Nikolai Grigoriev
1922 match	Vladimir Nenarokov defeated Nikolai Grigoriev
1922–23	Nikolai Grigoriev
1923 match	Nikolai Grigoriev drew with Vladimir Nenarokov
1923 match	Nikolai Grigoriev drew with Nikolai Zubarev
1924	Nikolai Grigoriev
1924 match	Vladimir Nenarokov defeated Nikolai Grigoriev
1925	Aleksandr Sergeyev
1926	Abram Rabinovich
1927	Nikolai Zubarev
1928	Boris Verlinsky
1929	Vasily Panov
1929 match	Nikolai Grigoriev
1930	Nikolai Zubarev
1931	Nikolai Riumin
1932	Sergey Belavenets, A. Orlov & Peter Alexeyevich Lebedev
1933–34	Nikolai Riumin
1935	Nikolai Riumin
1936	Vladimir Alatortsev & Ilya Kan
1937	Vladimir Alatortsev & Sergey Belavenets
1938	Sergey Belavenets & Vasily Smyslov
1939–40	Andor Lilienthal
1941	Alexander Kotov
1941–42	Isaak Mazel
1942	Vasily Smyslov
1943–44	Mikhail Botvinnik
1944–45	Vasily Smyslov
1946	David Bronstein
1947	Vladimir Simagin
1949	Yuri Averbakh
1950	Yuri Averbakh & Alexander Nikolayevich Chistyakov
1951	Tigran Petrosian
1952	Vladimir Zagorovsky
1953	David Bronstein
1954	Vladimir Alexandrovich Soloviev
1955	Evgeni Vasiukov
1956	Tigran Petrosian & Vladimir Simagin
1957	David Bronstein
1958	Evgeni Vasiukov
1959	Vladimir Simagin
1960	Evgeni Vasiukov
1961	David Bronstein
1962	Yuri Averbakh & Evgeni Vasiukov
1963	Anatoly Avraamovich Bikhovsky
1964	Nikolai Ivanovich Bakulin
1965	Lev Aronin
1966	Nikolai Ivanovich Bakulin
1967	Anatoly Pavlovich Volovich
1968	David Bronstein & Tigran Petrosian
1969	Igor Zaitsev
1970	Yuri Balashov
1971	Anatoly Lein
1972	Evgeni Vasiukov
1973	Mark Dvoretsky
1974	Boris Gulko
1975	Karen Grigorian
1976	Sergey Makarichev & Mikhail Tseitlin
1977	Mikhail Tseitlin
1978	Evgeni Vasiukov
1979	Karen Grigorian
1980	Anatoly Mikhailovich Kremenetsky
1981	Boris Gulko
1982	David Bronstein & Nukhim Rashkovsky
1983	Evgeny Sveshnikov
1984	Alexey Vyzmanavin
1985	Sergey Gorelov
1986	Alexey Vyzmanavin, Alexey Kuzmin
1987	Ratmir Kholmov
1988	Georgy Timoshenko
1989	Evgeny Bareev
1990	Evgeny Dragomaretzky
1991	Evgeni Maljutin
1992	Alexander Morozevich
1993	Ilya Frog
1994	Alexey Mitenkov
1995	Alexander Rustemov
1996	Yuri Yakovich
1997	Alexander Rustemov
1998	Evgeniy Najer
1999	Evgeny Vorobiov
2000	Vladimir Kosyrev
2001	Valentin Arbakov
2002	Andrei Kharitonov
2003	Evgeniy Najer
2004	Farrukh Amonatov
2005	Sergey Grigoriants
2006	Alexander Riazantsev
2007	Vladimir Belov
2008	Boris Savchenko
2009	Evgeny Vorobiov
2010	Nikolai Chadaev
2011	Nikolai Chadaev
2012	Ivan Popov
2013	Dmitry Gordievsky
2014	Vladimir Belous
2015	Urii Eliseev
2016	Boris Savchenko
2017	Dmitry Gordievsky
2018	Klementy Sychev
2019	Ivan Popov
2020	Mikhail Antipov
