= Raphael Falk =

Raphael Falk may refer to:

- Raphael Falk (chess player) (1856–1913), Russian chess master
- Raphael Falk (geneticist) (1929–2019), German-born Israeli geneticist and historian
