= Isaak Mazel =

Belarusian-Russian chess player

Isaak Yakovlevich Mazel (Russian: Исаак Яковлевич Мазель; Belarusian: Ісак Якаўлевіч Мазэль; December 1911, in Minsk – March 31, 1945, in Tashkent) was a Soviet chess master.

He tied for 8-9th at Moscow 1931 (the 7th USSR Chess Championship, Mikhail Botvinnik won), tied for 15-16th at Leningrad 1934 (the 9th USSR-ch, Grigory Levenfish and Ilya Rabinovich won).

He shared 2nd, behind Nikolai Riumin, in Moscow City Chess Championship in 1933/34, tied for 9-12th at Moscow 1936 (the 4th Trade Unions ch, Georgy Lisitsin and Vitaly Chekhover won), and won ahead of Vladimirs Petrovs in Moscow City-ch in 1941/42. He was married to Olga Rubtsova who later became Women's Chess World Champion.
