= Alexander Volzhin (chess player) =

Russian chess grandmaster (born 1971)

Personal information
- Born: 2 February 1971 (age 55)

Chess career
- Country: Russia
- Title: Grandmaster (1997)
- FIDE rating: 2540 (November 2026)
- Peak rating: 2560 (July 2002)

Alexander Volzhin (born 2 February 1971; Russian: Александр Волжин) is a Russian chess grandmaster.

== Chess career ==
Alexander Volzhin was born on 2 February 1971 in the southern Russian city of Makhachkala. He started playing chess when he was 5 years old. Volzhin was awarded the title of chess grandmaster in 1997. Notable tournament results include:

- Capablanca Memorial, Varadero (Cuba), 2000 - 1st place
- Bergen (Norway), 2000 - 1st place
- Dhaka (Bangladesh), 2001 - tied for 1st place (with Jaan Ehlvest)
- Ljubljana (Slovenia), 1999 - tied for 1st place
- Lausanne (Switzerland), 2000 - tied for 2nd place

In addition to playing, Volzhin has been a coach of a number of outstanding players, including Evgeny Bareev, Almira Skripchenko, Ekaterina Kovalevskaya, and Iweta Rajlich. Also, Volzhin has been a coach of the Russian national women's team during Chess Olympiads in Elista in 1998 (under the head coach Naum Rashkovsky, silver medal) and in Istanbul in 2000 (under the head coach Yuri Yakovich, bronze medal).

== Notable Games ==
- Volzhin - Miles, Cappelle-La-Grande, 1999
- Volzhin - Oral, Capablanca Memorial, 2000
- Ulybin - Volzhin, Dubai, 2002
- Volzhin - Vaganian, Russian Team Championship, 2005
- Rahman - Volzhin, Dhaka 2001

== Anti-Cheating Activism ==
Alexander Volzhin has been an outspoken fighter for integrity of professional chess. His article in the 64 Chess Magazine was one of the first on the issue of computer cheating when a player gets illegal help from computer engines. He also exposed a number of players involved in game fixing and pumping up their ratings.

== Business career ==
After retirement from international chess in early 2000s, Volzhin pursued career in business. Since 2007, he has worked for Barclays in London rising through the ranks to the position of a vice-president at Barclays Capital, the securities division of Barclays plc.
