= Evgeni Vasiukov =

Russian chess grandmaster (1933–2018)

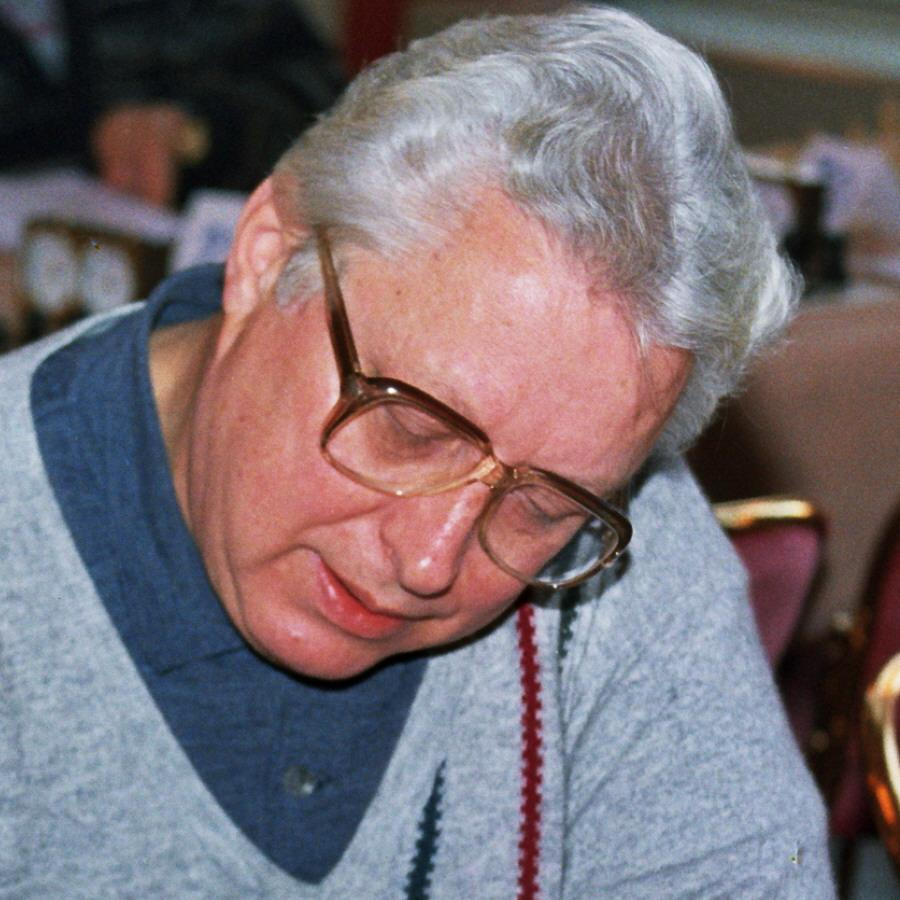
- Vasiukov at Bad Liebenzell 1995

Personal information
- Born: Evgeni Andreyevich Vasiukov; March 5, 1933 Moscow, Russian SFSR, Soviet Union
- Died: May 10, 2018 (aged 85) Moscow, Russia

Chess career
- Country: Soviet Union → Russia
- Title: Grandmaster (1961)
- Peak rating: 2580 (January 1976)
- Peak ranking: No. 17 (January 1976)

Evgeni Andreyevich Vasiukov (Russian: Евгений Андреевич Васюко́в, March 5, 1933 – May 10, 2018) was a Russian chess player, one of the strongest in the world during his peak. He was awarded the title of Grandmaster by FIDE in 1961. During his career, he won the Moscow Championship on six occasions (1955, 1958, 1960, 1962, 1972, and 1978) and scored numerous victories in international tournaments, such as Belgrade Open 1961, Moscow International 1961, East Berlin 1962, Reykjavik 1968, and Manila 1974. He was rarely at his best in Soviet Championship Finals, which were among the very toughest events in the world, and never made the Soviet team for an Olympiad or a European Team Championship. Vasiukov won the World Senior Chess Championship in 1995.

== Early years ==
Vasiukov was born on March 5, 1933, in Moscow. His family was evacuated to Tula during World War II, and his father died in the Battle of Kursk. He learned to play chess at the age of 15, a very late age even for that time. In 1954, he was awarded the title Master of Sports of the USSR in Chess (ru). That same year, Vasiukov represented Moscow in the Soviet Team Championship finals in Riga. He scored his first important chess success in 1955 by winning the Moscow City Championship with a score of 10½/15 points, ahead of Salo Flohr, who was second. He played in the Soviet Championship semi-final at Yerevan 1955 and finished in the middle of a powerful field.

Vasiukov represented the Soviet Union twice in Student Olympiads. In 1955 at Lyon, he was first reserve, and scored 5½/6 (+5 =1 −0). Then at Uppsala 1956, he made exactly the same score as first reserve, this time winning a board gold medal. Both times, the Soviet Union won team gold medals.

Although scoring respectably in his first two attempts at qualifying for the Soviet Final (10/18 at Kharkiv 1956 and 10½/19 at Kyiv 1957), he failed to advance, but was gathering experience and strength at high levels.

== International Master ==
Vasiukov got his first international chance at Gotha 1957, where he placed third with 10/15; the winner was David Bronstein. This earned him the title of International Master in 1958; he won the Moscow Championship again later that same year. At the Moscow International of 1959 (Alexander Alekhine memorial), Vasiukov tied for 4th-6th places with 6/11, behind only winners Vasily Smyslov, Boris Spassky, and Bronstein. He made the field for his first Soviet final at Tbilisi 1959 (URS-26ch), where he finished tied 16th-17th with 7/19; Tigran Petrosian won. However, he regrouped with his third Moscow Championship title in 1960.

== Grandmaster, peak form ==
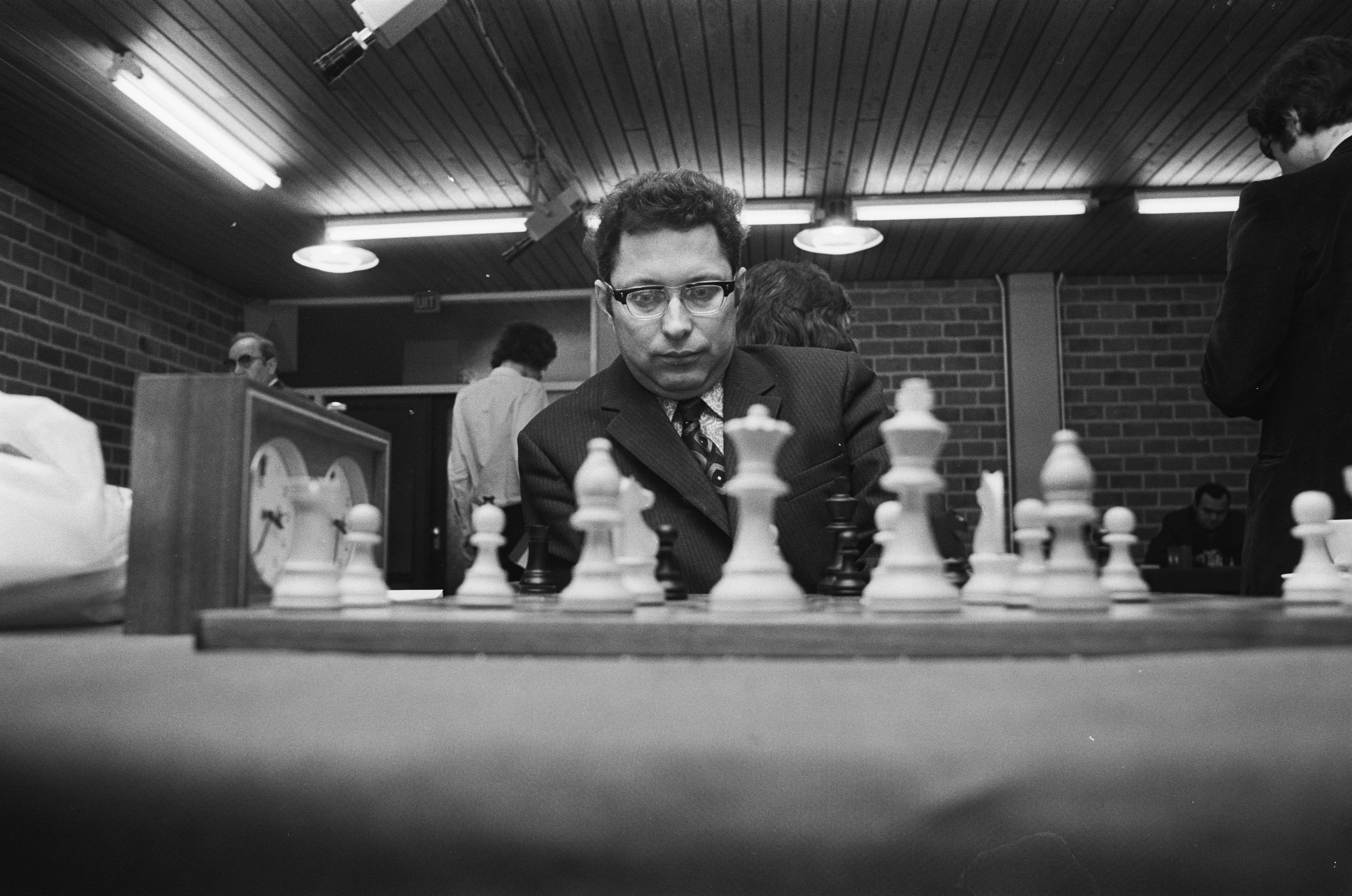
Vasiukov (1973)

Vasiukov scored his best result when he won the 1961 Belgrade Open, ahead of Svetozar Gligorić. Then, in the Moscow International of 1961, he tied for first place with Smyslov at 7½/11. These two fine finishes earned him the title of Grandmaster later that year. In the 1961 Moscow Championship, he tied for 3rd–5th places with 11/17, behind winners Bronstein and Leonid Shamkovich. Qualifying again for the Soviet final at Baku 1961 (URS-29ch), he showed improvement to tie for 4th–5th places, with 12/20, as Spassky won. This would prove to be his best performance at that level. At the 1962 Moscow International, Vasiukov ended up second with 9½/15, behind winner Yuri Averbakh. Vasiukov proved his grandmastership at East Berlin 1962 with a powerful victory, at 11½/15, ahead of Leonid Stein. Vasiukov also tied for first in the 1962 Moscow Championship, his fourth title there.

During his peak years, from the early 1960s to the mid-1970s, Vasiukov scored wins in individual games over many top Soviet players, such as Smyslov, Bronstein, Tigran Petrosian, Mikhail Tal, Paul Keres, Mark Taimanov, Efim Geller, and Lev Polugaevsky. He was unable to defeat top-ranking Soviet stars such as Viktor Korchnoi, Anatoly Karpov, Boris Spassky, or Stein.

== Soviet Championship frustrations ==
The Soviet Championships were usually the strongest tournaments in the world during Vasiukov's main competitive period, surpassing the strength of Interzonals, with very few if any weaker opponents, since the arduous qualifying process eliminated the outsiders. Other than his superb showing in 1961, Vasiukov usually played below his expectations in these finals. He qualified for the finals a total of eleven times. At Kyiv 1964–65 (URS-ch32), he scored 8/19 to tie 13–14th place; the winner was Korchnoi. At Tallinn 1965 (URS-ch33), he again made only 8/19 for a tied 14-17th place; the winner was Stein. At Tbilisi 1966 (URS-ch34), also a Zonal, he scored below 50% once more with 9/20, for a tied 14-16th place, as Stein won again. The next year at Kharkiv (URS-ch35), the format was a Swiss system, and Vasiukov was just above the middle of the pack, as Tal and Polugaevsky won. At Alma Ata 1968 (URS-ch36) he scored 10½/19, good for a tied 6-10th spot, as Polugaevsky tied with Alexander Zaitsev. At Moscow 1969 (URS-ch37), also a Zonal, he managed just 9½/22 for 15th place; the winners were Polugaevsky and Tigran Petrosian. At Baku 1972 (URS-ch40), he did well with 11½/21 for a tied 6-7th finish; the winner was Tal. At Leningrad 1974 (URS-ch42), he ended with 7/15 for a tied 12–13th place; the winners were Tal and Alexander Beliavsky. In the 1975 Vilnius Zonal, he scored 7½/15 for tenth place, as the winners were Boris Gulko, Vladimir Savon, Yuri Balashov, and Vitaly Tseshkovsky. Finally at Vilnius 1980–81 (URS-ch49), he placed tied 11-12th with 8½/17, as the winners were Beliavsky and Lev Psakhis.

Since Vasiukov never placed near the top in Soviet Zonal competition, he was unable to earn an opportunity to play in an Interzonal tournament.

== Tournament victories in five decades ==
Vasiukov was unable to maintain his peak of the early 1960s, but he remained remarkably competitive for many years afterwards, especially in international tournaments outside the Soviet Union which had mixed-strength fields, where he scored most of his successes. He won several titles, and was almost always around the top places, when he competed outside the Soviet Union. He tied for first at Polanica-Zdrój 1965 with Péter Dely at 9½/13. At Reykjavík 1968, he tied for first with Taimanov on 10½/14. He again tied with Taimanov for the title at Skopje 1970 with 11/15. Vasiukov claimed his fifth Moscow Championship in 1972.

Vasiukov had the top performance of his career with his win at Manila 1974 at 10½/14, as he was ahead of Petrosian and Bent Larsen, among others, in a top-class field. He won at Zalaegerszeg 1977 with 9/12, ahead of Ratmir Kholmov. He was Moscow Champion for the sixth time in 1978, and won at Dnepropetrovsk 1980.

He tied for first at Moscow 'B' 1986 (still a very strong field) on 7½/11, along with Edvīns Ķeņģis and Zurab Azmaiparashvili. Vasiukov won at Athens 1987 (Acropolis International) and at Budapest 1989 with 10/13, ahead of Gennady Timoshchenko. He took second at Belgorod 1990 (Miron Sher was first) at 9/14. He took the title at Graested 1990 with 6/9, ahead of Nigel Davies and Bent Larsen. He tied for first in a Veterans' event at Moscow 1991 with 5½/9, along with Geller.

== International team play ==
While never making the Soviet side for an Olympiad or a European Team Championship, Vasiukov did get several chances to represent the Soviet Union in team matches. He played five times in the traditional match against Yugoslavia, at Lvov 1962, Rijeka 1963, Sukhumi 1966, Skopje 1969, and Tbilisi 1973. He played against Hungary at Moscow 1971. He also competed in the first two Telechess Olympiads: 'I' from 1977–78, and 'II' from 1981-82. In his latest years he was on the Russian team at the European and World Senior Team Championships.

== Notable games ==
- Evgeniy Vasiukov vs Mark Taimanov, USSR Team Championship, Riga 1954, Ruy Lopez, Classical Variation (C64), 1–0 Impressive win over a player who had tied for the Soviet title two years earlier.
- Evgeniy Vasiukov vs Lev Polugaevsky, USSR Team Championship semi-final, Voroshilovgrad 1955, Sicilian Defence, Alapin Variation (B22), 1–0 Vasiukov takes Polu out of book with a sharp, original opening, then brings home the point.
- Tigran Petrosian vs Evgeni Vasiukov, Moscow Championship 1956, English Opening (A16), 0–1 White plays a bit passively in the opening, and Black builds an aggressive formation and scores with a strong Kingside attack.
- Evgeniy Vasiukov vs David Bronstein, USSR Championship, Baku 1961, Caro-Kann Defence (B10), 1–0 Very unusual opening brings success.
- Paul Keres vs Evgeniy Vasiukov, USSR Championship, Baku 1961, Sicilian Defence, Kan Variation (B42), 0–1 Vasiukov arrives at the elite level when he can beat world-class players such as Keres with Black.
- Evgeniy Vasiukov vs Vasily Smyslov, USSR Championship, Tbilisi 1966, Ruy Lopez, Closed Variation (C92), 1–0 A patient strategical win over a former World Champion.
- Efim Geller vs Evgeniy Vasiukov, Kislovodsk 1968, Pirc Defence, Classical Variation (B08), 0–1 Unusual to see Vasiukov playing an offbeat line as Black, but it works wonderfully here.
- Mikhail Tal vs Evgeniy Vasiukov, USR Championship, Alma-Ata 1968, Ruy Lopez, Closed Variation (C98), 0–1 Former World Champion Tal over-reaches in his attack.

== Books ==
- Vasiukov, Evgeni (1996). The Chronicle of the World Chess Championship '96. Dhzangar.
- Ilyumzhinov, Kirsan ("with commentary by GM Evgeni Vasiukov") (1996). Gagarin, Vasily Vladimirovich (ed.). Paris, Elista, Yerevan ... The World Chess Championship 1996, Karpov–Kamsky (in English and Russian). Translated by Webb, Laurence. Moscow: Russlit (publisher). ISBN 5865080733. OCLC 38446089. OCLC 906755671. (283 Pages; 16 pages of Plates; Illustrations; Photos; Diagrams)

== Notes and references ==
=== References ===
- Karpov, Anatoly Yevgenyevich, ed. (1990). "1948: В. Загоровский" [1948: V. Zagorovsky] (PDF). Шахматы: Энциклопедический Словарь (Russian Chess Encyclopedia and Biographical Dictionary) (in Russian). Moscow: Great Soviet Encyclopedia. ISBN 5852700053. OCLC 606026618.
- McClain, Dylan Loeb (May 24, 2018) [May 11, 2018]. "Evgeni Vasiukov, Russian Chess Grandmaster, Is Dead at 85". The New York Times. p. A22.
- "Evgeni Vasiukov (1933–2018) Passed Away". Russian Chess Federation. May 10, 2018.
