= Sergey Makarichev =

Russian chess player (born 1953)

Sergei Makarichev
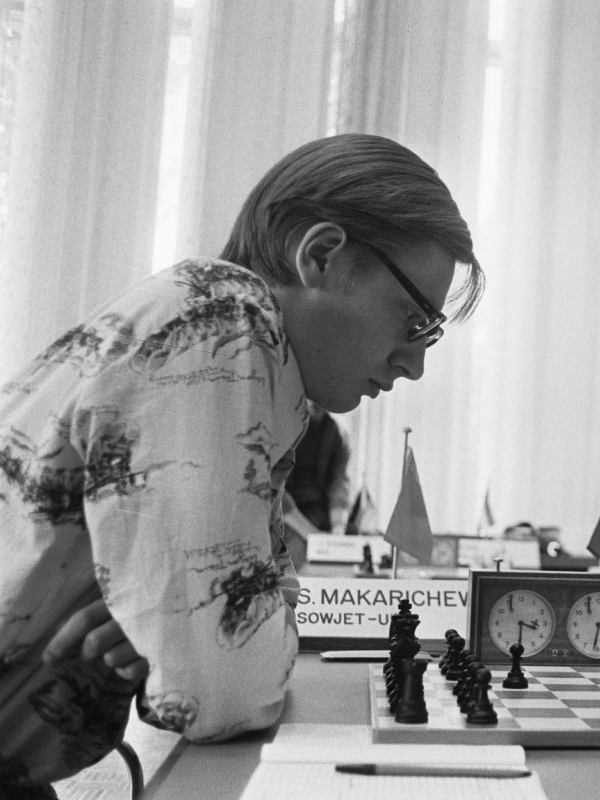
- Sergei Makarichev, Amsterdam 1975

Personal information
- Born: Sergei Yuryevic Makarichev; November 17, 1953 (age 72) Moscow, Soviet Union

Chess career
- Country: Russia
- Title: Grandmaster (1977)
- FIDE rating: 2519 (July 2026) (inactive since July 1999)
- Peak rating: 2550 (January 1991)
- Peak ranking: No. 44 (January 1981)

Sergei Yuryevic Makarichev (Russian: Серге́й Юрьевич Макарычев; born November 17, 1953) is a Russian chess player, who gained the Grandmaster title in 1976.

== Background ==
In 1974 he won the European Junior Chess Championship in Groningen. Makarichev gained the title of International Master in 1974 and became a Grandmaster in 1976. His highest FIDE rating was 2550 in January 1991, which places him 84th in the world at that time. His best world ranking was 61st, in July 1983. He has not been an active player since July 1999.

Makarichev is a noted chess trainer. He was Anatoly Karpov's second in the 1985 World Championship, Garry Kasparov's second in the 1993 PCA World Championship, and became a FIDE Senior Trainer in 2007. Alongside his wife, he has also presented chess programs on the Russian channel NTV Plus Sport.

He also presents chess games and analysis on his Russian-language YouTube channel, Makarychev Chess. He currently resides in the USA.

== Notable tournament results ==
- 1973/4 European Junior Chess Championship (Groningen) 1st
- 1975 Amsterdam 2nd=
- 1976 Moscow City Chess Championship 1st= (with Mikhail Tseitlin)
- 1983 Moscow City Chess Championship 1st= (with Evgeny Sveshnikov)
- 1983 Novi Sad 1st=
- 1984 Oslo 2nd=
- 1992 Tal Memorial (Open) 1st= with Nukhim Rashkovsky and Mikhail Krasenkov
