= Aleksei Goncharov (chess player) =

Russian chess master

Aleksei Fyodorovich Goncharov (Russian: Алексей Фёдорович Гончаров; 16 January 1879 in Moscow – 23 April 1913 in Moscow) was a Russian chess master.

He won twice Moscow City Chess Championship in 1901 (jointly with Raphael Falk) and 1909. He also tied for 2nd–3rd in 1899 (the 1st RUS-ch, minor section), took 4th in 1900/01 (the 2nd All-Russian Masters' Tournament, Mikhail Chigorin won), shared 2nd, behind Boyarkov, in 1902, and took 2nd, behind Mikhail Chigorin, in 1907, all in Moscow.
