= Urii Eliseev =

Russian chess grandmaster (1996–2016)

Personal information
- Born: July 29, 1996 Moscow, Russia
- Died: November 26, 2016 (aged 20) Moscow, Russia

Chess career
- Country: Russia
- Title: Grandmaster (2013)
- Peak rating: 2614 (November 2016)

Urii Mikhailovich Eliseev (Russian: Юрий Михайлович Елисеев; July 29, 1996 – November 26, 2016) was a Russian chess player. He won the Under-16 section of World Youth Chess Championship in 2012 and was awarded the Grandmaster title by FIDE in 2013 at the age of 17. He won the Moscow Chess Championship in 2015 and the Moscow Open in 2016. He was ranked 212th in the world and 42nd in Russia, with an Elo rating of 2614.

Eliseev died in November 2016 at the age of 20 after falling from a balcony on the 12th floor of a Moscow apartment block. Grandmaster Daniil Dubov, who was a friend of Eliseev, wrote on social media that he slipped while trying to climb from a window to the balcony. Eliseev's flatmate, International Master Shamil Arslanov, told Russian TV that the parkour enthusiast "loved extreme things" and had climbed between the window and the balcony before.
