= Shakhmatny Bulletin =

Russian chess magazine

December 1990 - the last issue

Shakhmatny Bulletin (Russian: Шахматный бюллетень; Chess Bulletin) was a Russian chess magazine. It was published monthly from 1955 to 1990 and published about 2,500 complete games per year. Yuri Averbakh was an editor. The circulation was 20,000. Bobby Fischer called Shakhmatny Bulletin "the best chess magazine in the world."
