= Alexander Solovtsov =

Russian chess player

Alexander Vladimirovich Solovtsov (Russian: Александр Соловцов; 14 November 1847, in Kazan – 20 March 1923, in Moscow) was a prominent Russian chess master who made significant contributions to the chess world during the late 19th and early 20th centuries.

In the Sankt Petersburg tournament of 1878/79, Solovtsov performed admirably, tying for 3rd-4th place and then drawing a match for the third place with Emanuel Schiffers with a score of 1:1.

He also participated in a noteworthy correspondence match between the Moscow and St. Petersburg chess clubs from January 1878 to March 1879. The match concluded with the Moscow team emerging victorious, winning with a score of 2:0.

During the Moscow tournament of 1879, Solovtsov achieved another significant milestone by sharing the first place. The following year, in the Moscow tournament of 1880, he secured a victory, finishing ahead of players like Hellwig, Muratov, and Maude.

Throughout his career, Solovtsov engaged in several matches against esteemed opponents. In 1884, he drew a match with another Russian chess legend, Mikhail Chigorin, with a final score of 1:1. In 1892, Solovtsov emerged victorious against Raphael Falk with a score of 7:2. However, he faced defeat in 1893, losing to Chigorin with a score of 0:4.

In 1894, Solovtsov demonstrated his capabilities once more, defeating Jacques Mieses, and showcasing his strength in chess.

In the year 1899, he achieved a significant triumph by winning the match against Boris Grigoriev, earning him the title of the first champion of Moscow.
