= Vasily Smyslov =

Soviet chess grandmaster (1921–2010)

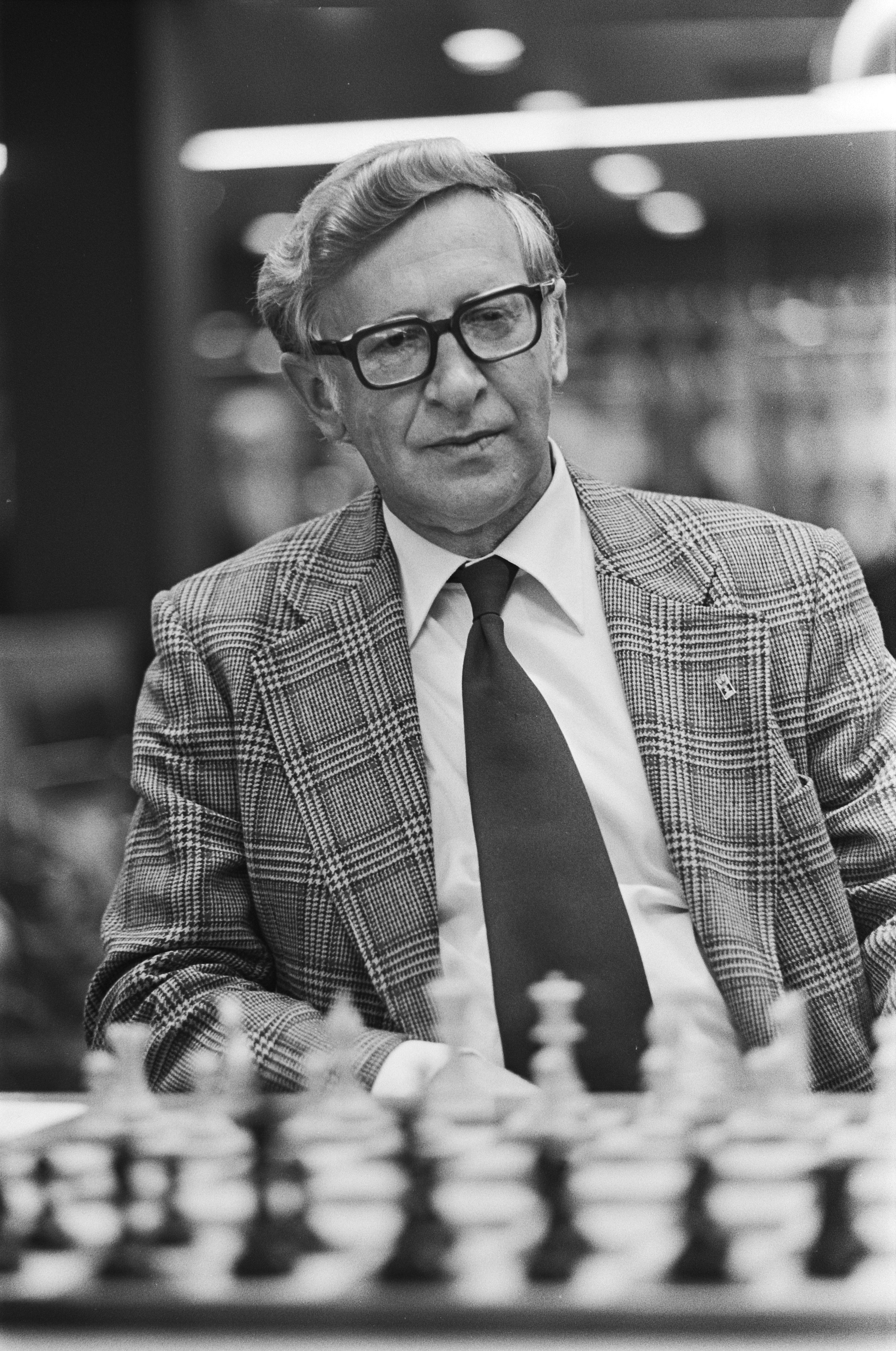
- Smyslov in 1977

Personal information
- Born: Vasily Vasilyevich (Vasilievich) Smyslov; 24 March 1921 Moscow, Russian SFSR
- Died: 27 March 2010 (aged 89) Moscow, Russia

Chess career
- Country: Soviet Union
- Title: Grandmaster (1950)
- World Champion: 1957–58
- Peak rating: 2620 (July 1971)
- Peak ranking: No. 9 (July 1971)

Vasily Vasilyevich Smyslov (Russian: Васи́лий Васи́льевич Смысло́в, romanized: Vasíliy Vasíl'yevich Smyslóv; 24 March 1921 – 27 March 2010) was a Soviet and Russian chess grandmaster who was the seventh World Chess Champion from 1957 to 1958. He was a Candidate for the World Chess Championship on eight occasions (1948, 1950, 1953, 1956, 1959, 1965, 1983, and 1985). Smyslov twice tied for first place at the USSR Chess Championships (1949, 1955), and his total of 17 Chess Olympiad medals won is an all-time record. In five European Team Championships, Smyslov won ten gold medals.

Smyslov remained active and successful in competitive chess well over the age of sixty. Despite his failing eyesight, he remained active in the occasional composition of chess problems and studies until shortly before his death in 2010. Besides chess, he was an accomplished baritone singer.

== Early years ==
Smyslov was born in Moscow, into a Russian family. He first became interested in chess at the age of six. His father, Vasily Osipovich Smyslov, worked as an engineering technician and had represented the St. Petersburg Technical Institute in intercollegiate chess competitions. The senior Smyslov, who had also studied chess for a time under the tutelage of Mikhail Chigorin, became his son's first teacher, and gave him a copy of Alexander Alekhine's book My Best Games of Chess 1908–1923. The future world champion would later write that this book became his constant reference, and that "...I was later to read everything that my father had in his library: Dufresne's handbook, separate numbers of the Soviet chess magazines Chess and Chess Sheet, the text-books of Lasker and Capablanca, and the collections of games of Soviet and international tournaments. The games of the great Russian chess master M. I. Chigorin made an indelible impression on me; it was with interest that I read the various declarations on questions of strategy by A. I. Nimzovitch; I studied attentively the genius of prominent Soviet masters."

Smyslov's competitive chess experiences began at the age of 14, when he started taking part in classification tournaments. In 1938, when he was 17, Smyslov won the USSR Junior Championship. That same year, he tied for 1st–2nd places in the Moscow City Championship, with 12½/17. However, Smyslov's first attempt at adult competition outside his own city fell short; he placed 12th–13th in the Leningrad–Moscow International tournament of 1939 with 8/17 in an exceptionally strong field. In the Moscow Championship of 1939–40 Smyslov placed 2nd–3rd with 9/13.

== War years ==
In his first Soviet final, the 1940 USSR Chess Championship (Moscow, URS-ch12), he performed exceptionally well for 3rd place with 13/19, finishing ahead of the reigning champion Mikhail Botvinnik. This tournament was the strongest Soviet final up to that time, as it included several players, such as Paul Keres and Vladas Mikėnas, from countries annexed by the USSR following the Nazi–Soviet Pact of 1939.

The Soviet Federation held a further tournament of the top six from the 1940 event, and this was called the 1941 Absolute Championship of the USSR, one of the strongest tournaments ever organized. The format saw each player meet his opponents four times. The players were Botvinnik, Keres, Smyslov, Isaac Boleslavsky, Igor Bondarevsky, and Andor Lilienthal. Smyslov scored 10/20 for third place, behind Botvinnik and Keres. This proved that Smyslov was of genuine world-class Grandmaster strength at age 20, a very rare achievement at that time.

World War II forced a halt to most international chess, but several tournaments involving Soviet players only were still organized. Smyslov was exempted from military service due to being severely nearsighted, and he won the 1942 Moscow Championship outright with a powerful 12/15. At Kuibyshev 1942, he placed second with 8/11. In a strong field at Sverdlovsk 1943, Smyslov tied for 3rd–4th places with 8/14. In the 1943–44 Moscow Championship, Smyslov tied for 3rd–4th with 11½/16. He finished second in the 1944 USSR Championship at Moscow (URS-ch13) with 10½/16. He emerged as champion from the 1944–45 Moscow Championship with 13/16. By this juncture, Smyslov had advanced into the group of the top three Soviet players, along with Botvinnik and Keres, who were playing in Nazi-occupied Europe during the war.

As the war ended, organized chess picked up again. But Smyslov's form hit a serious slump in the immediate post-war period. In the 1945 USSR Championship at Moscow (URS-ch14), Smyslov was in the middle of the very powerful field with 8½/17; the winner was Botvinnik, with Boleslavsky and the new star David Bronstein occupying second and third places. At Tallinn 1945, Smyslov had the worst result of his career, scoring just 6½/15 in a not especially strong field. It was little better in the Moscow Championship of 1945–46, as he could only score 7½/15 for a tie of 7th–11th places, as Bronstein won. Then in the Moscow Championship of 1946, Smyslov scored just 8½/15, for a tie of 3rd–6th places, as Bronstein won again. During this period he scored just 31/62 in those four tournaments, for 50%.

Nevertheless, Smyslov's earlier strong results secured him one of the five Soviet places in the first really strong post-war international tournament, at Groningen, Netherlands, in August 1946. This event, the Howard Staunton Memorial, was won by Botvinnik with 14½/19, half a point ahead of former World Champion Max Euwe. Smyslov finished third with 12½/19, and this reconfirmed his status as one of the world's top players.

Once he was back playing in Soviet events, however, Smyslov found it tough going for a while. In the next Soviet Championship (URS-ch15, Leningrad 1947), he tied for 3rd–4th places with 12/19, as Keres won. At Pärnu 1947, Smyslov scored 8/13, tying for 4th–6th places, as Keres won again. At Warsaw 1947, Smyslov scored 6/9 to tie for 2nd–5th places; the winner was Svetozar Gligorić. In the Mikhail Chigorin Memorial tournament, Moscow 1947, Smyslov tied for 3rd–4th places, with 10/15, as Botvinnik won.

His results showed a consistent pattern of high finishes against strong company, but with virtually no tournament championships. Smyslov had never actually won an adult tournament (other than the Moscow City Championship) before he played in the 1948 World Championship Tournament.

== World title challenger ==
Smyslov was one of the five players selected to compete for the 1948 World Chess Championship tournament to determine who should succeed the late Alexander Alekhine as champion. His selection was questioned in some quarters, but this criticism was amply rebutted when he finished second behind Mikhail Botvinnik, with a score of 11/20.

With his second-place finish from the 1948 World Championship, Smyslov was admitted directly into the 1950 Budapest Candidates' tournament without needing to play in qualifying events. Smyslov scored 10/18 for third place, behind Bronstein and Boleslavsky, who tied for first place. Smyslov's third place automatically qualified him into the next Candidates' tournament. He was awarded the International Grandmaster title in 1950 by FIDE on its inaugural list.

After winning the Candidates Tournament in Zürich 1953, with 18/28, two points ahead of Keres, Bronstein, and Samuel Reshevsky, Smyslov played a match with Botvinnik for the title the following year. Sited at Moscow, the match ended in a draw, after 24 games (seven wins each and ten draws), meaning that Botvinnik retained his title.

== World Champion ==
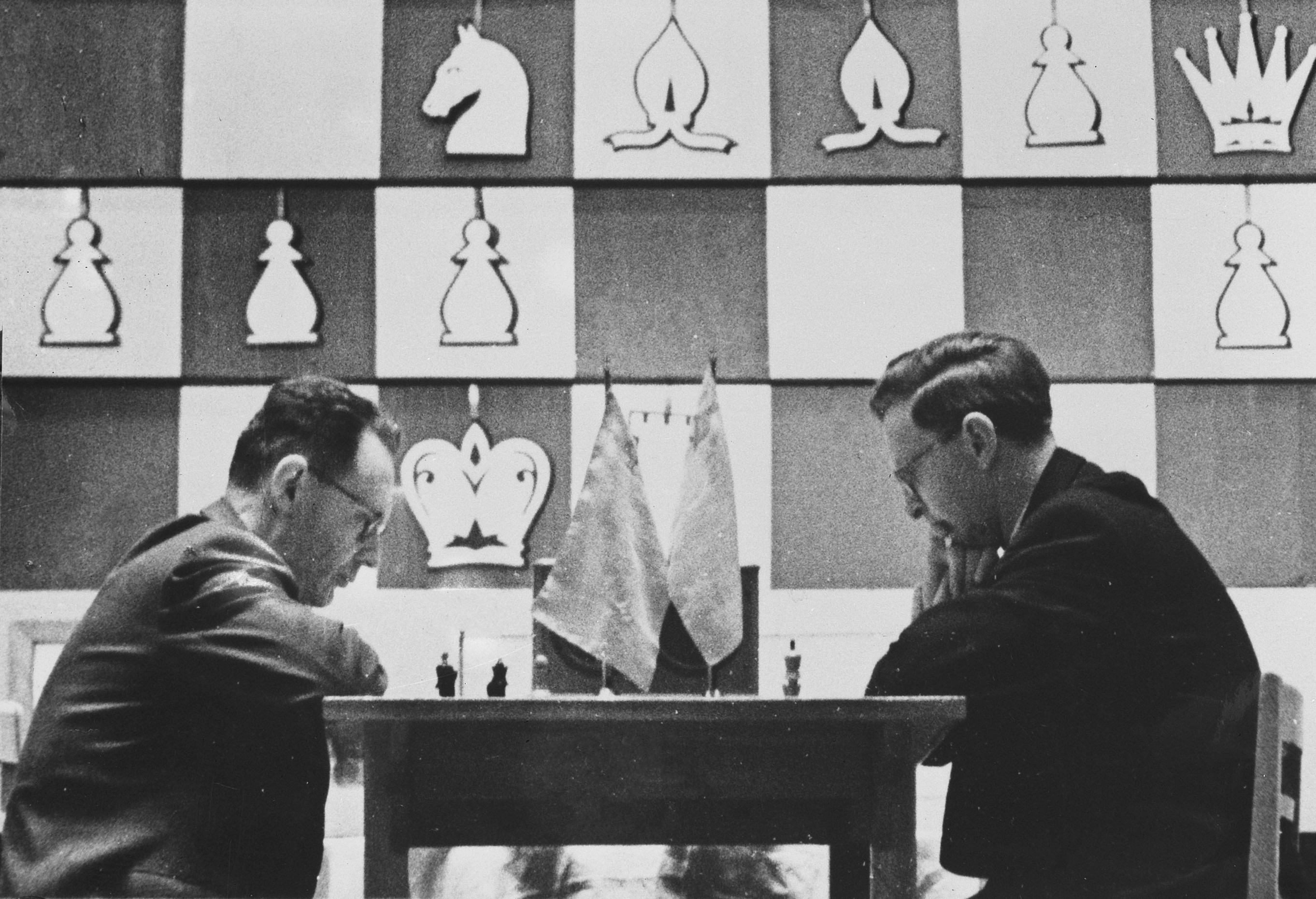
Botvinnik vs. Smyslov (right) at the World Chess Championship 1957

Smyslov again won the Candidates' Tournament at Amsterdam in 1956, this time by 1½ points. This qualified him for a second world championship match against Botvinnik in 1957. Assisted by trainers Vladimir Makogonov and Vladimir Simagin, Smyslov won the title, scoring 12½–9½. The following year, Botvinnik exercised his right to a rematch, and regained the title with a final score of 12½–10½. Smyslov later said his health suffered during the return match, as he came down with pneumonia, but he also acknowledged that Botvinnik had prepared very thoroughly. Over the course of the three World Championship matches, Smyslov had 18 wins to Botvinnik's 17 (with 34 draws), yet was only champion for a year. Nonetheless, Smyslov wrote in his autobiographical games collection Smyslov's Best Games, "I have no reason to complain of my fate. I fulfilled my dream and became the seventh world champion in the history of chess."

== Later World Championships ==
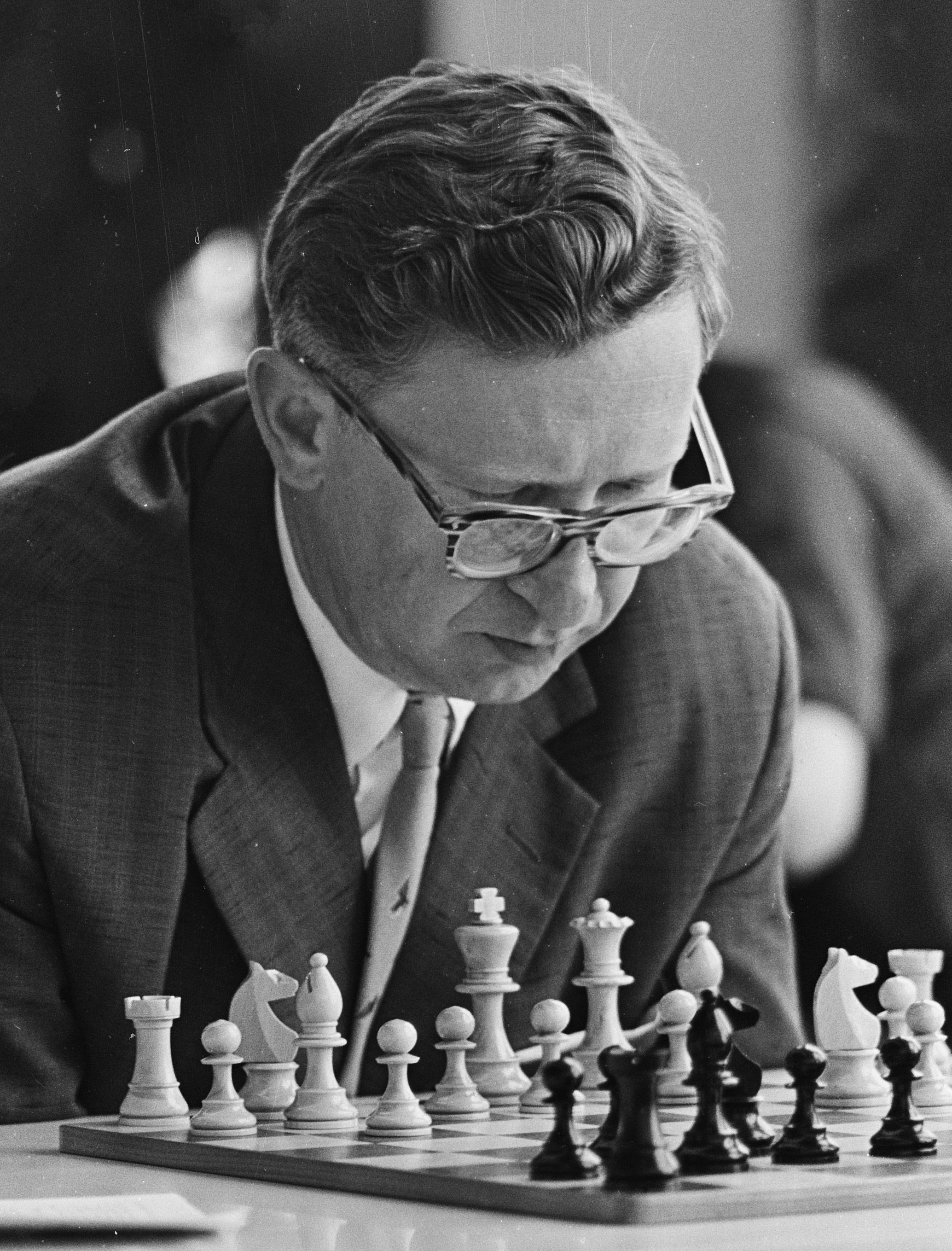
Smyslov at the Amsterdam Interzonal in 1964

Smyslov did not qualify for another World Championship, but continued to play in World Championship qualifying events. He was a Candidate in 1959, but finished fourth in the qualifying tournament held in Yugoslavia, which was won by the rising superstar Mikhail Tal. He missed out in 1962, but was back in 1964, following a first-place tie at the Amsterdam Interzonal, with 17/23. However, he lost his first-round match to Efim Geller.

In 1983, at the age of 62, he reached the Candidates' Final (the match to determine who plays the champion, in that case Anatoly Karpov), losing 8½–4½ at Vilnius 1984 to Garry Kasparov, who was 21 at the time, and who went on to beat Karpov to become world champion in 1985. He had beaten Zoltán Ribli 6½–4½ in the semifinal, but drew his quarter-final match against Robert Hübner 7–7, with the advancing player (Smyslov) determined only by the spin of a roulette wheel. His final Candidates' appearance was the Montpellier 1985 tournament, where he did not advance.

== Soviet Championships ==
Smyslov was a frequent competitor at the Soviet Championships and enjoyed some notable successes. In 1940, while still a teenager, he finished third behind Bondarevsky and Lilienthal. At the 13th Championship in 1944, he placed second behind Botvinnik and in 1947, shared third with Bondarevsky, finishing behind Keres and Boleslavsky.

He was a joint winner of the contest in 1949 and again in 1955 (with Bronstein and Geller respectively). Whilst the 1949 title was shared, the 1955 title was awarded to Geller after a play-off.

Much later in his career he showed that he could still mount a credible challenge; he took a share of third place in 1969 (behind Petrosian and Polugaevsky) and in 1971, was joint runner-up with Tal, behind Savon. He was ranked by FIDE as one of the top 15 players in the world from the late 1940s into the early 1980s, a stretch of almost 40 years.

== Post-war tournament record ==
Smyslov maintained an active tournament schedule throughout the 1950s, 1960s and 1970s, registering many top three finishes in some of the most prestigious tournaments of the period.

In 1950, he was second behind Kotov at Venice and in 1951, won the Chigorin Memorial, held in Leningrad. He shared third place with Botvinnik at Budapest (Maróczy Memorial) in 1952, behind Keres and Geller. In 1953, he won a training tournament in Gagra and finished third at Bucharest, behind Tolush and Petrosian. At the 1954–55 edition of the Hastings Congress, he shared first place with Keres. At Zagreb 1955, he was sole winner, two clear points ahead of the field. He continued his winning streak at Moscow's Alekhine Memorial in 1956, a victory shared with his constant rival, Botvinnik. During this period, there were several triumphs in his city of birth, when he shared first place with Bronstein and Spassky at the inaugural edition of the Moscow Central Chess Club international tournament series (sometimes also referred as an Alekhine Memorial) in 1959, was a joint winner in both 1960 (with Kholmov) and 1961 (with Vasiukov), and won outright in 1963.

His good form continued throughout the 1960s. There were shares of second place at Dortmund 1961 (behind Taimanov) and at Mar del Plata 1962 (behind Polugaevsky). He traveled again to Hastings at the end of 1962, and scored third place behind Gligoric and Kotov. In 1963, he was second at Sochi (Chigorin Memorial) behind Polugaevsky. His visit to Havana's Capablanca Memorial in 1964 resulted in a share of first with the East German, Uhlmann. He took outright first at the same tournament the following year. In 1966, there were victories at Mar del Plata and at the Rubinstein Memorial in Polanica-Zdrój. In 1967, he was second (behind Fischer) at Monte Carlo, won at Moscow, and finished second (behind Stein) at the city's Alekhine Memorial tournament. He placed third the same year at the Capablanca Memorial in Havana (behind Larsen and Taimanov) and finished third again at Palma de Mallorca 1967 and Monte Carlo 1968, the latter two events both being headed by Larsen and Botvinnik. This was also the year he repeated his previous success at Polanica-Zdrój, finishing first outright. His next trip to Hastings also ended in triumph, as he took clear first at the 1968–69 edition. The 1960s drew to a close with victory at Monte Carlo 1969 (shared with Portisch) and a share of third place at Skopje 1969 (with Uhlmann and Kholmov, behind Hort and Matulović).

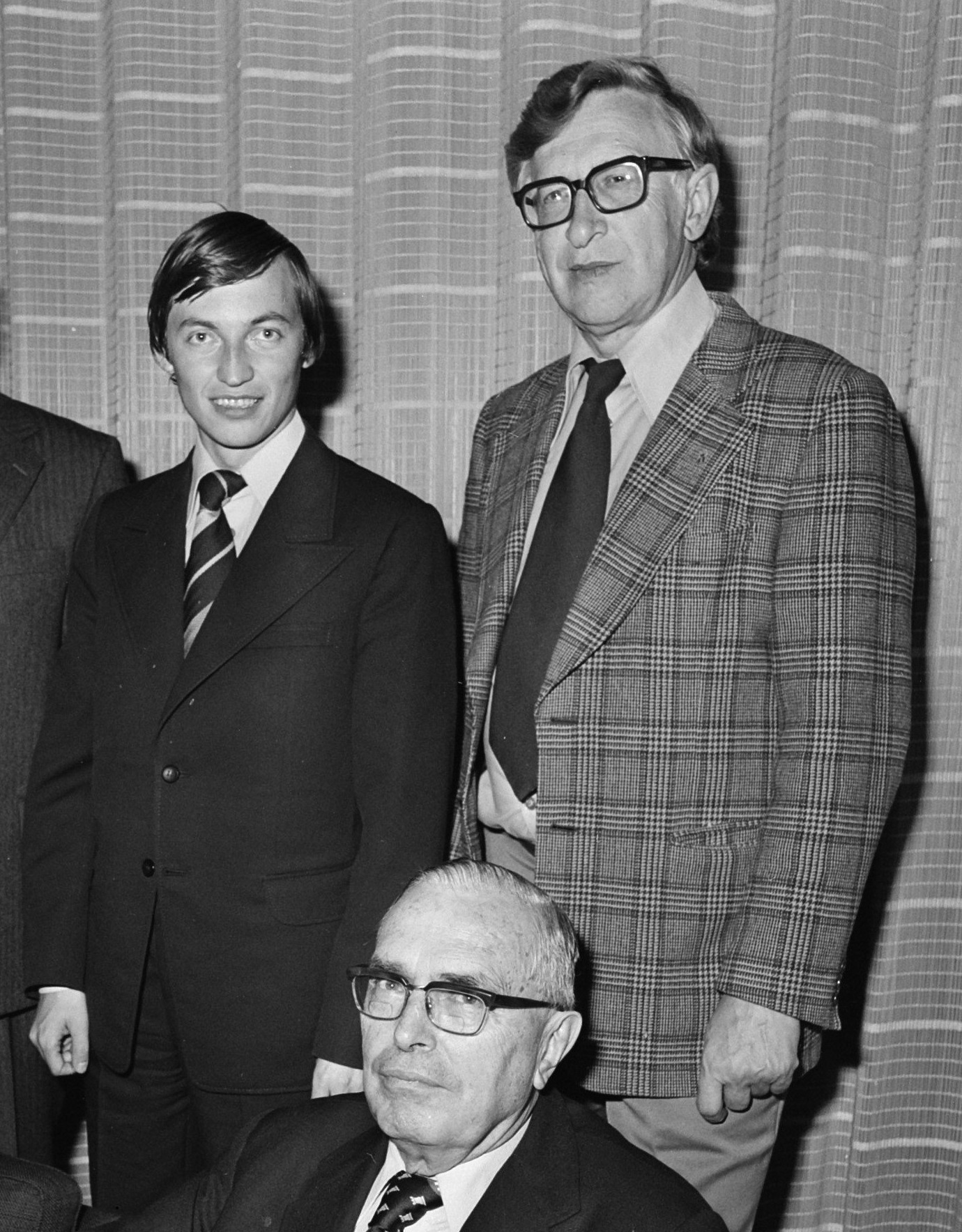
Karpov (left), Euwe (bottom) and Smyslov at the 1977 Tilburg chess tournament

While less prolific than in previous decades, Smyslov played many strong tournaments in the 1970s and even into the 1980s and beyond. He was joint runner-up with Hort, Gligoric and Korchnoi at Rovinj/Zagreb 1970, behind Fischer. A winner at Amsterdam 1971, he came third at the Alekhine Memorial (Moscow) in the same year, behind Karpov and Stein. At Las Palmas 1972, he was second equal with Larsen, behind Portisch and in 1973, topped the Capablanca Memorial in Cienfuegos. First place followed at Reykjavík 1974; at the Venice tournament of the same year, he finished second behind Liberzon. Then followed a second place at the Alexander Memorial (Teesside) in 1975 (behind Geller), a first place at Szolnok (also 1975), and a multi-way share of second at the large Lone Pine Open of 1976 (Petrosian won). He finished third behind Oleg Romanishin and Tal at Leningrad in 1977, when all three eclipsed the efforts of then–world champion Anatoly Karpov. In 1978, he won at São Paulo and finished with a share of second at Buenos Aires, behind Andersson. As the 1970s ended, he took first place at Berlin 1979, this time shared with Csom.

Notable outcomes for 1980 included joint first places at San Miguel (with Browne, Panno, Jaime Emma) and at Copenhagen (the Politiken Cup, with Mikhalchishin). In the same year he finished second at Bar, behind Petrosian, and second at Baguio, behind Torre. At Moscow 1981, he joined Kasparov and Polugaevsky in second place, behind Karpov. A further Hastings visit in 1981–82 resulted in a share of second place, with Speelman, behind Kupreichik. He was first at Graz in 1984 and first equal at Copenhagen (Politiken Cup) 1986 with Chernin, Pigusov and Cserna. He played at Reggio Emilia over the New Year of 1986–87 and shared second spot with Hort, Chernin and Spassky, behind Ribli. At Hastings in 1988–89, he took a share of third with Gulko and Speelman, behind Short and Korchnoi.

Smyslov remained on FIDE's top 100 list until he was 70 years old. His tournament appearances were fewer in the 1990s, but results included a share of first place at Buenos Aires 1990 and a share of second at Malmö (Sigeman) in 1997, behind Hellers.

== Team competition ==
Vasily Smyslov
Medal record

Representing Soviet Union

Men's chess

Olympiad
Gold medal – first place	1952 Helsinki	Open team
Gold medal – first place	1952 Helsinki	Individual board 2
Gold medal – first place	1954 Amsterdam	Open team
Bronze medal – third place	1954 Amsterdam	Individual board 2
Gold medal – first place	1956 Moscow	Open team
Gold medal – first place	1958 Munich	Open team
Silver medal – second place	1958 Munich	Individual board 2
Gold medal – first place	1960 Leipzig	Open team
Gold medal – first place	1960 Leipzig	Individual board 1st reserve
Gold medal – first place	1964 Tel Aviv	Open team
Gold medal – first place	1964 Tel Aviv	Individual board 3
Gold medal – first place	1968 Lugano	Open team
Gold medal – first place	1968 Lugano	Individual board 2nd reserve
Gold medal – first place	1970 Siegen	Open team
Bronze medal – third place	1970 Siegen	Individual board 1st reserve
Gold medal – first place	1972 Skopje	Open team
Silver medal – second place	1972 Skopje	Individual board 3

European Championship
Gold medal – first place	1957 Vienna	Open team
Gold medal – first place	1957 Vienna	Individual board 1
Gold medal – first place	1961 Oberhausen	Open team
Gold medal – first place	1961 Oberhausen	Individual board 5
Gold medal – first place	1965 Hamburg	Open team
Gold medal – first place	1965 Hamburg	Individual board 4
Gold medal – first place	1970 Kapfenberg	Open team
Gold medal – first place	1970 Kapfenberg	Individual board 5
Gold medal – first place	1973 Bath	Open team
Gold medal – first place	1973 Bath	Individual board 6

Smyslov represented the Soviet Union a total of nine times at chess Olympiads, from 1952 to 1972 inclusive, excepting only 1962 and 1966. He contributed strongly to team gold medal wins on each occasion he played, winning a total of eight individual medals. His total of 17 Olympiad medals won, including team and individual medals, is an all-time Olympiad record, according to olimpbase.org.

At Helsinki 1952, he played second board, and won the individual gold medal with 10½/13. At Amsterdam 1954, he was again on second board, scored 9/12, and took the individual bronze medal. At Moscow 1956, he scored 8½/13 on second board, but failed to win a medal. At Munich 1958, he made 9½/13 on second board, good for the silver individual medal. At Leipzig 1960, he was dropped to first reserve, and made a great score of 11½/13, which won the gold medal.

After missing out on selection in 1962, he returned for Tel Aviv 1964, on third board, and won the gold medal with 11/13. He missed selection in 1966, but returned with a vengeance for Lugano 1968, and made a phenomenal 11/12 for another gold medal as second reserve. At Siegen 1970, he was first reserve, and scored 8/11 for the bronze medal. His final Olympiad was Skopje 1972, where at the age of 51 he played third board and scored 11/14, gaining the silver medal.

His overall Olympiad score is an imposing 90 points in 113 games (+69−2=42), for 79.6%. This performance is the fifth all-time best for players participating in at least four Olympiads. Smyslov also represented the USSR in five European Team Championships, and emerged with a perfect medals' record: he won five team gold medals and five board gold medals. His total score in these events was +19−1=15, for 75.7%. From olimpbase.org, here is his European teams' data.

- Vienna 1957: board 1, 3½/6 (+2−1=3), board and team gold medals;
- Oberhausen 1961: board 5, 8/9 (+7−0=2), board and team gold medals;
- Hamburg 1965: board 4, 6/9 (+3−0=6), board and team gold medals;
- Kapfenberg 1970: board 5, 5/6 (+4−0=2), board and team gold medals;
- Bath, Somerset 1973: board 6, 4/5 (+3−0=2), board and team gold medals.

Smyslov played for the USSR in both the 1970 and 1984 matches against teams representing the Rest of the World. He was on board six at Belgrade in 1970, and on board four at London in 1984, with the Soviets winning both matches.

== Final years ==
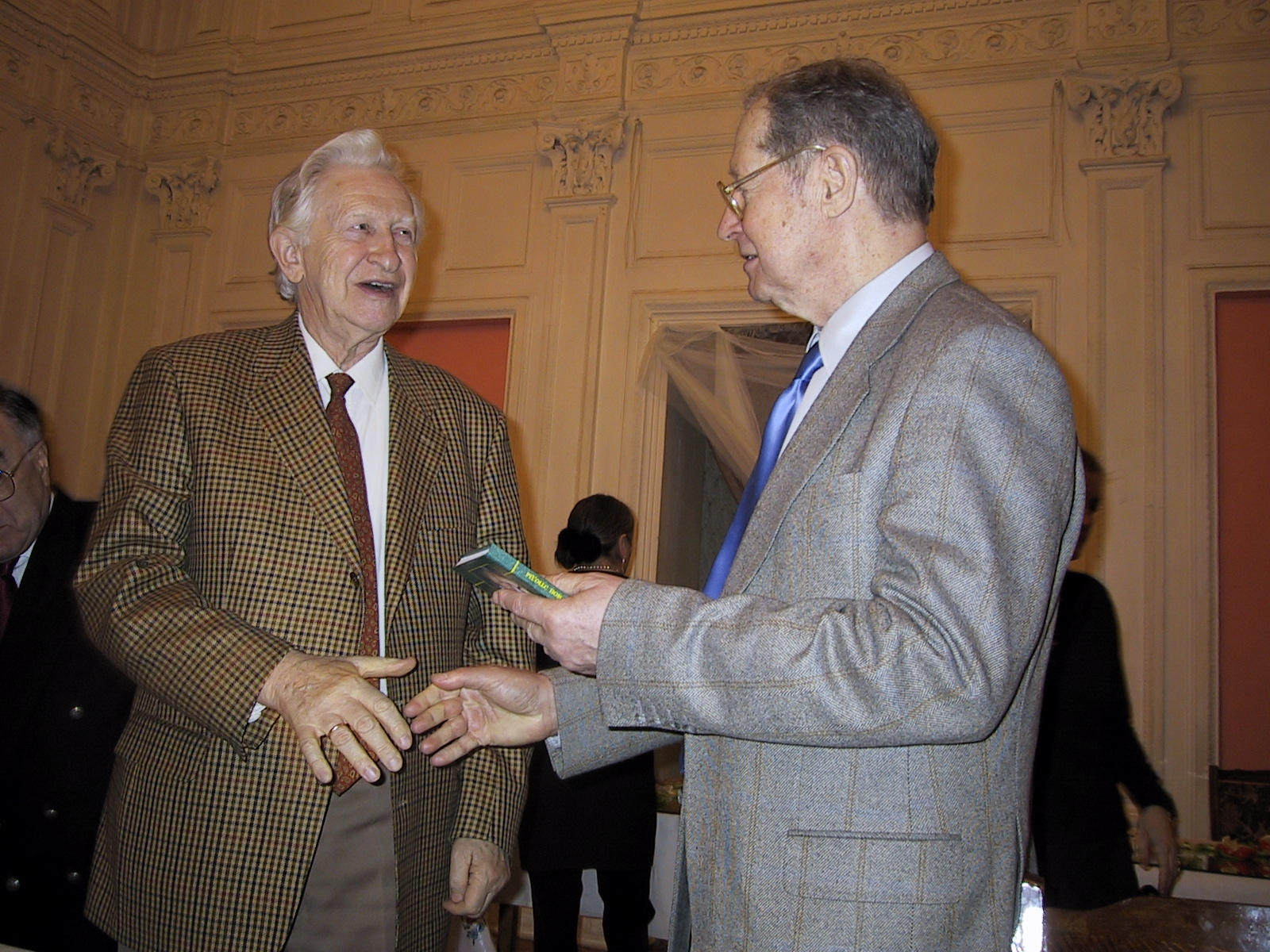
Smyslov congratulates Yuri Averbakh at his 80th birthday and presents him with a book of his own chess studies.

In 1991, Smyslov won the inaugural World Senior Chess Championship. With a FIDE rating still around 2400 as of the year 2000, the 80-year old grandmaster participated in what was to be his final tournament, the Klompendans Veterans Vs. Ladies Tournament in Amsterdam. The highlight of the match was his rout of Zsofia Polgar, leaving the all-time record between the two as +5–1=3. Some of the matches were adjourned early as draws due to his failing eyesight, and Smyslov officially retired from competitive play after this tournament. His Elo rating after this event was 2494.

Smyslov died of congestive heart failure in a Moscow hospital on the morning of 27 March 2010, three days after his 89th birthday. Reports circulated that his final years were spent in near-poverty and that he could not afford badly needed eye surgery. It was also reported that Smyslov and his wife Nadezhda mostly lived on income from renting their apartment and that no one checked on them or provided care.

== Chess style and legacy ==
Smyslov was known for his positional style, and, in particular, his precise handling of the endgame, but many of his games featured spectacular tactics as well. His opening repertoire was conventional for the 1950s–1960s era, featuring mainly the Ruy Lopez and English Opening as White, and the Sicilian Defense and Nimzo-Indian Defense as Black. He made enormous contributions to chess opening theory, including the English Opening, Grünfeld Defence, and the Sicilian Defence.

A variation of the Closed Ruy Lopez is named after him. The line runs 1.e4 e5 2.Nf3 Nc6 3.Bb5 a6 4.Ba4 Nf6 5.0-0 Be7 6.Re1 b5 7.Bb3 d6 8.c3 0-0 9.h3 h6. In the Grünfeld Defence, the continuation 1.d4 Nf6 2.c4 g6 3.Nc3 d5 4.Nf3 Bg7 5.Qb3 dxc4 6.Qxc4 0-0 7.e4 Bg4 8.Be3 Nfd7 is known as the Smyslov Variation, and remains a major variation. Smyslov also successfully revived the Fianchetto Defence to the Ruy Lopez (1.e4 e5 2.Nf3 Nc6 3.Bb5 g6) in the 1970s. In the Slav Defence, the sideline 1.d4 d5 2.c4 c6 3.Nc3 Nf6 4.Nf3 dxc4 5.a4 Na6 is named the Smyslov Variation. Finally, a variation of the King's Indian Defense is named after him, which proceeds with the moves 1.d4 Nf6 2.c4 g6 3.Nc3 Bg7 4.Nf3 0-0 5.Bg5 d6 6.e3.

Stanley Kubrick named a character after him in his film 2001: A Space Odyssey.

== Opera singer ==
A baritone, Smyslov only decided upon a chess career after a failed audition with the Bolshoi Theatre in 1950. He occasionally gave recitals during chess tournaments, often accompanied by fellow grandmaster and concert pianist Mark Taimanov. Smyslov once wrote that, as in music, he tried to achieve harmony on the chess board, with each piece assisting the others. He also recorded operatic arias.

Dutch insurance company Interpolis once released an EP sung entirely by Smyslov on their record label imprint Interpolis Verzekeringen to celebrate the fifth anniversary of the Interpolis chess tournament. The EP, titled Schaakgrootmeester Vassily Smyslov Zingt (English: Chess Grandmaster Vassily Smyslov Sings), contains vocal covers of traditional Dutch songs accompanied by orchestra conducted by Harry van Hoof.

== Personal life ==
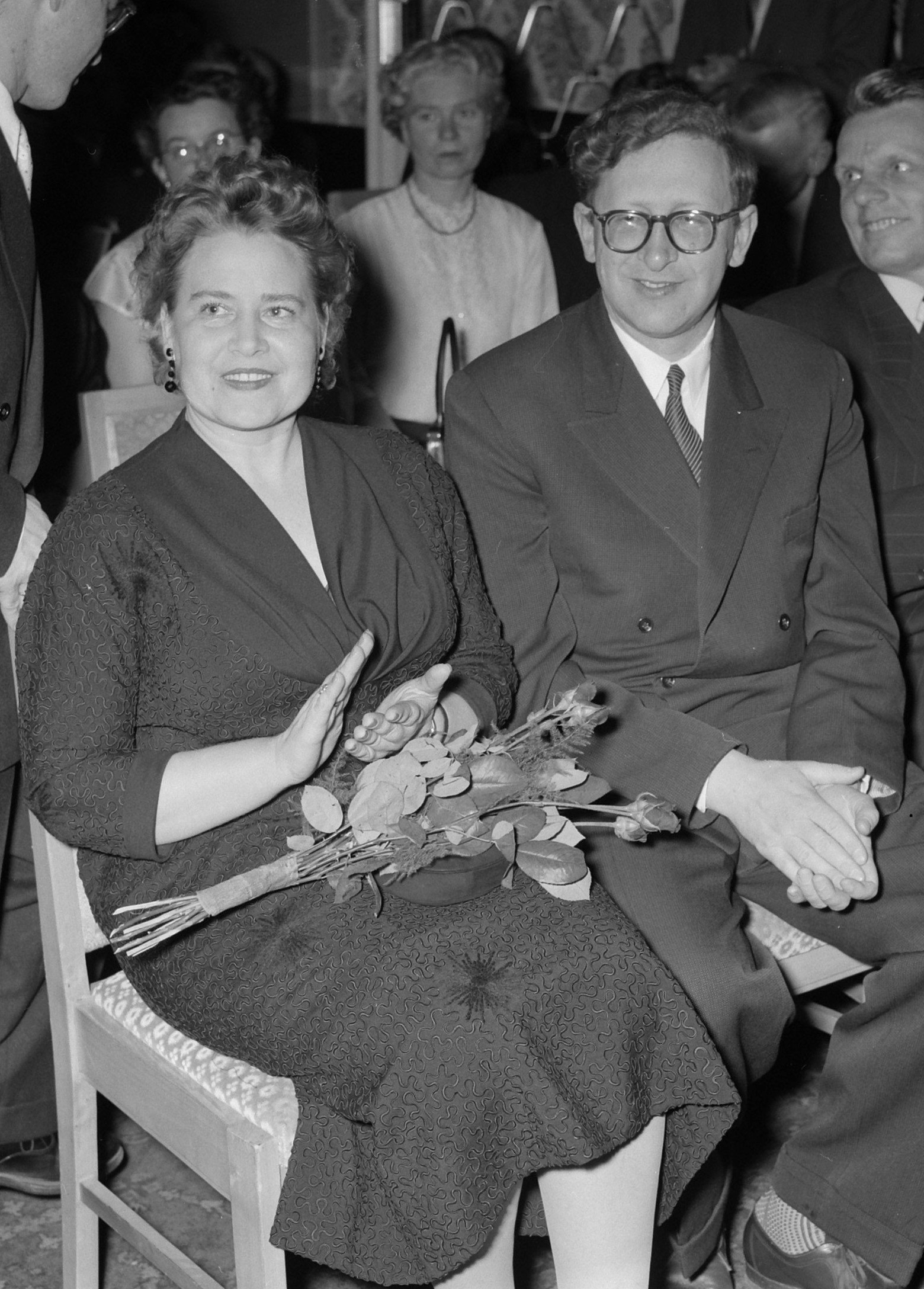
Smyslov with his wife at the 1956 Candidates Tournament

For more than 50 years, Smyslov was married to Nadezhda Smyslova, a woman three years his senior whose first husband was executed during a Stalinist purge in the early 1940s. They met in 1948. Nadezhda had a son from her first marriage, an aspiring chess player who competed at the World Junior Championship. Vasily and Nadezhda had no children of their own. She often accompanied her husband at major tournaments to provide moral support. However, she remained in Moscow during the 1959 Candidates tournament when, to the consternation of Soviet authorities, the normally staid Smyslov had a flagrant affair with a woman grandmaster that affected his play. Smyslov's stepson, Vladimir Selimanov, represented the USSR at the 1957 World Junior Championship at Toronto, where he finished 4th. Selimanov died by suicide in 1960.

== Books by Smyslov ==
- Vasily Smyslov (2003) Smyslov's Best Games, Volume 1: 1935–1957 (Moravian Chess Publishing House)
- Vasily Smyslov (2003) Smyslov's Best Games, Volume 2: 1958–1995 (Moravian Chess Publishing House)
- Vasily Smyslov (1997) Endgame Virtuoso (Cadogan)
- Vasily Smyslov (1995) Smyslov's 125 Selected Games (modern edition published by Everyman Chess)
- Grigory Levenfish and Vasily Smyslov (1971) Rook Endings (Batsford Edition)

== Notable games ==
- Tigran Petrosian vs Vasily Smyslov, USSR Championship, Moscow 1949, Sicilian Defence, Scheveningen Variation (B84), 0–1 The first meeting of two future World Champions goes to Smyslov in a precise positional performance.
- Vasily Smyslov vs Efim Geller, USSR Championship, Moscow 1951, Sicilian Defence, Closed Variation (B26), 1–0 Smyslov used the Closed Sicilian periodically throughout his life, and made many important improvements.
- Paul Keres vs Vasily Smyslov, Zurich Candidates' Tournament 1953, English Opening: Anglo-Indian Defense. Hedgehog System (A17) 0–1 In a vital late-tournament encounter, Smyslov fights off Keres' very dangerous attack, to put himself in the driver's seat towards winning the tournament.
- Vasily Smyslov vs Mikhail Botvinnik, World Championship Match, Moscow 1954, game 9, French Defence, Winawer Variation (C17), 1–0 Smyslov blows up one of the World Champion's favourite variations with a queen sacrifice to score a stunning win.
- Mikhail Botvinnik vs Vasily Smyslov, World Championship Match, Moscow 1954, game 14, King's Indian Defence, Fianchetto Variation (E68), 0–1 With one of the deepest pre-game home preparations ever seen, Smyslov unleashes a chain of tactical wizardry, including a queen sacrifice, to record a beautiful win which fundamentally changed the theory in this variation.
- Vasily Smyslov vs David Bronstein, Candidates' Tournament, Amsterdam 1956, English Opening (A34), 1–0 The two players were fighting for the right to qualify, late in the tournament, and Smyslov finds a way to come out on top.
- Vasily Smyslov vs Mikhail Tal, Candidates' Tournament, Yugoslavia 1959, Sicilian Defence, Najdorf / Opecensky Variation (B92), 1–0 It was their first-ever meeting, and the young star Tal gets a sharp lesson from the veteran.
- Robert Fischer vs Vasily Smyslov, Candidates' Tournament, Yugoslavia 1959, Sicilian Defence, Fischer / Sozin Variation (B86), 0–1 The 16-year-old Fischer had honed this opening line into a formidable weapon, but here Smyslov shows him a few new wrinkles.
- Vasily Smyslov vs Boris Spassky, Moscow vs Leningrad team match 1960, Alekhine's Defence (B05), 1–0 Spassky tries the unusual Alekhine's Defence and is beaten in fairly short order.
- Vasily Smyslov vs Anatoly Karpov, USSR Championship, Leningrad 1971, English Opening / Queen's Gambit (A34), 1–0 Karpov was the young rising star, but here he lasts for only 29 moves against Smyslov, who is 30 years older.
- Vasily Smyslov vs Zoltan Ribli, World Championship Candidates Semi-final, London 1983, Queens Gambit, Semi-Tarrasch Defence (), 1-0 The finest game of Smyslov's semi-final win, featuring several sacrifices.

Awards
Preceded by Mikhail Botvinnik	World Chess Champion; 1957–1958	Succeeded by Mikhail Botvinnik
