= Valentin Arbakov =

Russian chess grandmaster (1952–2003)

Personal information
- Born: January 28, 1952
- Died: November 30, 2003 (aged 51)

Chess career
- Title: Grandmaster (1994)
- Peak rating: 2575 (January 1994)

Valentin Mikhailovich Arbakov (28 January 1952 – 30 November 2003) was a Russian chess Grandmaster. In 1981, he shared first place in that year's Moscow City Chess Championship together with Andrei Sokolov. He was known for his skills in blitz chess.
