= Dmitry Gordievsky =

Russian chess player

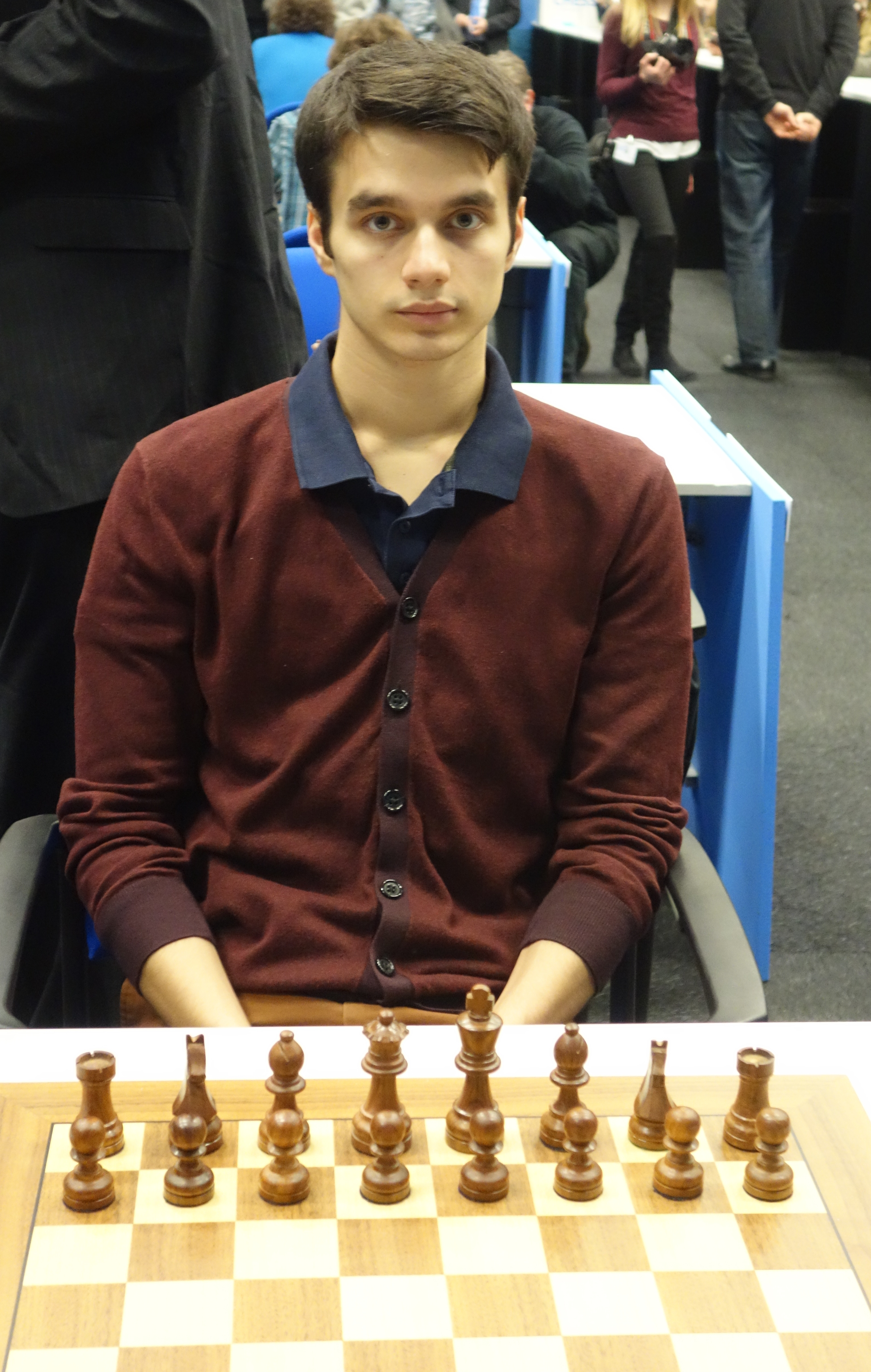
- Dmitry Gordievsky at the Tata Steel Challengers, January 2018

Personal information
- Born: Dmitry Sergeevich Gordievsky; 24 April 1996 (age 30) Moscow, Russia

Chess career
- Country: Russia
- Title: Grandmaster (2017)
- FIDE rating: 2524 (July 2026)
- Peak rating: 2653 (May 2018)
- Peak ranking: No. 100 (May 2018)

Dmitry Sergeyevich Gordievsky (Russian: Дмитрий Сергеевич Гордиевский; born 24 April 1996) is a Russian chess grandmaster.

== Chess career ==
Born in 1996, Gordievsky earned his international master title in 2016 and his grandmaster title in 2017.

In February 2018, he participated in the Aeroflot Open. He finished third out of ninety-two, scoring 6½/9 (+4–0=5).
