= Fikret Sideifzade =

Azerbaijani chess player

- Fikret Sideifzade in 2023

Personal information
- Born: January 1, 1952 (age 74) Baku, Azerbaijan SSR, USSR

Chess career
- Country: Soviet Union, Azerbaijan
- Title: International Master (1992)
- FIDE rating: 2361 (June 2023)
- Peak rating: 2445 (January 1992)

Fikret Israfil Oglu Sideifzade (Azerbaijani: Fikrət İsrafil oğlu Sideifzadə; born 1 January 1952) is an Azerbaijani chess International Master (IM). He played in the Azerbaijani team at the European Team Chess Championships in Pula in 1997 and in Plovdiv in 2003.

Sideifzade was five-time champion of Azerbaijan SSR (1974, 1976, 1977, 1979, 1984).
