= Vladimir Nenarokov =

Russian chess player (1880–1953)

Vladimir Ivanovich Nenarokov (January 4, 1880 – December 13, 1953) was a chess master and theoretician. Born in Moscow, he was one of the strongest masters in his home town around 1900.

In 1899, he tied for 6-7th in Moscow (1st Russian Championship, Mikhail Chigorin won). In 1900 he won the first Moscow City Championship. In 1901, he took 5th in Moscow (2nd RUS-ch, Chigorin won). In 1905, he drew a match with Savielly Tartakower (+2 –2 =0); won against Fyodor Duz-Khotimirsky (+5 –3 =1) in 1907, and won against the sixteen-year-old Alexander Alekhine (+3 –0 =0) in 1908. Nenarokov won the Moscow Championship again in 1908.

In 1916, he took 2nd, behind Alekhine, in Moscow. He also took 2nd, behind Alekhine, and ahead of Abram Rabinovich, at Moscow 1918 (Triangular).

He took 3rd at the 3rd Moscow championships in 1921 (Grigoriev won); tied for 3rd-5th at Petrograd 1923 (2nd USSR Championship, Peter Romanovsky won); tied for 6-8th at Moscow 1924 (3rd USSR-ch, Efim Bogoljubov won); took 18th at Leningrad 1925 (4th USSR-ch, Bogoljubov won); took 7th at Moscow 1927 (5th USSR-ch, Fedor Bogatyrchuk and Romanovsky won); took 2nd, behind Boris Verlinsky, at the 9th Moscow championships in 1928; took 6th at Odessa 1929 (6th USSR-ch, Quartel Final); won at Tiflis (Tbilisi) 1929; took 3rd at Tiflis 1930 (Vsevolod Rauzer won), and tied for 3rd-4th at Tiflis 1930 (Goglidze won).

Nenarokov was awarded the International Master title in 1950.

He is an author of many chess books, focusing on the chess opening. In addition to some good introductory books, he also wrote a more advanced book on the Ruy Lopez (Moscow–Leningrad 1932) that was later published in German.
