= Vladimir Simagin =

Russian chess grandmaster (1919 - 1968)

- Born: Vladimir Pavlovich Simagin; 21 June 1919; Moscow, Soviet Russia
- Died: 25 September 1968 (aged 49); Kislovodsk, Russian SFSR, Soviet Union
Vladimir Simagin
Chess career
- Country: Russia
- Title: Grandmaster (1962)
- Peak rating: 2650 (October 1949)
- Peak ranking: No. 21 (December 1946)

Vladimir Simagin (June 21, 1919 in Moscow – September 25, 1968 in Kislovodsk) was a Russian chess grandmaster. He was three times Moscow champion (1947, 1956, and 1959), helped to train Vasily Smyslov to the World Championship, and made many significant contributions to chess openings. He died of a heart attack while playing in the Kislovodsk tournament.

== Biography ==
Vladimir Pavlovich Simagin was a much-admired Soviet player and teacher. He was a late bloomer by chess standards, although much of this can be put down to the timing of World War II, which stopped most chess competition in the Soviet Union for several years. He received the International Master title in 1950—the year F.I.D.E. implemented the title—and earned the Grandmaster title in 1962. He also earned the International Master title in correspondence chess in 1965, and was Soviet correspondence champion in 1964.

He scored 8.5/17 in the 1945 Moscow Championship, for a tied 7th-8th places, well behind champion Vasily Smyslov. Simagin's first important high-class result was second place in the 1946 Moscow Championship, with 11/15, behind winner David Bronstein. In the 1946 Baltic Championship at Vilnius, he scored 13/19 while playing 'hors concours', and this was good for fourth place, behind the top placed Yuri Averbakh (also h.c.). In the 1947 Moscow Championship, he tied for top place with Bronstein and Georgy Rivinsky, with 9/14, and then won the playoff match-tournament. Also in 1947, he tied for 1st-2nd with Semyon Furman in the Championship of the Spartak Club, with 15/19, and also won that playoff match.

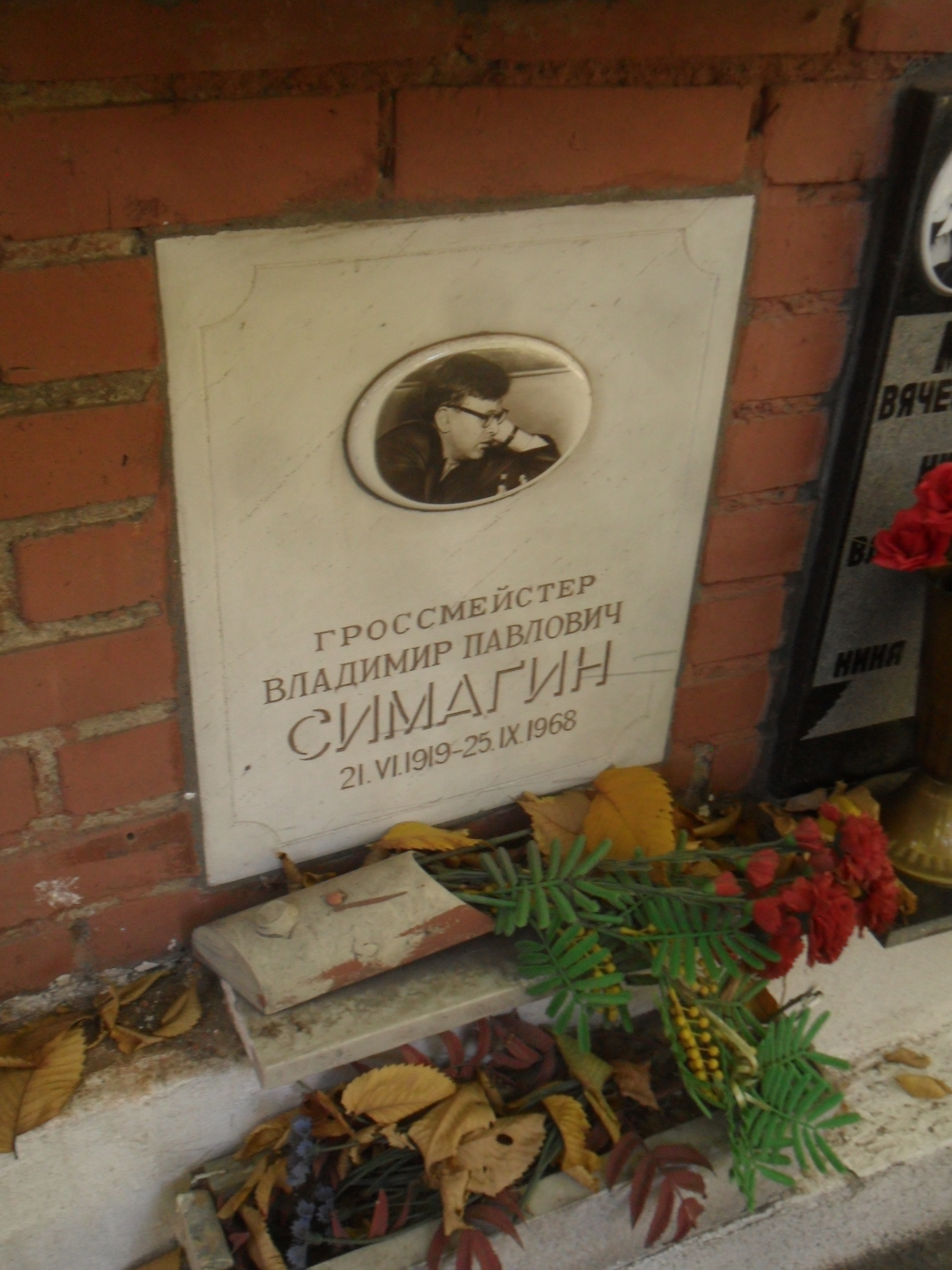
Simagin's grave

It took him some time to qualify for his first Soviet final. He was unsuccessful in the semi-final at Leningrad 1945 (URSchsf-14) with 5.5/15 for a tied 14th-15th place. He improved the next year, also at Leningrad (URSchsf-15) with 9.5/18, but this was not good enough to advance. In the semi-final at Vilnius 1949 (URSchsf-17), he again failed to move on with a tied 7th-8th place, at 9/17, with the winners being Furman, Vladas Mikėnas, and Alexey Sokolsky. He improved at Tula 1950 (URSchsf-18) with 8/15 for a tied 5th-7th place, but still fell short, as the winners were Averbakh and Georgy Borisenko.

At Pärnu 1947, he struggled with 4/13, far behind winner Paul Keres. Being Moscow champion helped earn him a place on the Moscow side for the home-and-home match series with Budapest in 1949. This was one of the very best results of his career, as he scored a powerful 12/16, good for a 2732 performance, according to chessmetrics.com. Chessmetrics ranks Simagin as #21 in the world from December 1946 to February 1947, and calculates his peak rating at 2650 in October 1949. However, this data seems to be missing several of his tournament results. In the Moscow Championship of 1949, he made 8.5/15 for 4th place, behind winner Averbakh. In the Moscow Championship of 1950, he scored 8/15 for 5th place, behind winners Averbakh and Alexander Chistiakov.

Simagin, along with Vladimir Makogonov, trained Vasily Smyslov for several years, leading to his World Championship title in 1957. His best results were a tied second place at Sarajevo 1963, and a tied first place at Sochi 1967.

== Playing style and contributions to chess theory ==
Simagin had a bold and imaginative playing style, and he was an expert tactician. His style has been compared to both Richard Réti and Bent Larsen. He was a profound originator in the openings. Examples of his contributions include the Accelerated Dragon variation in the Sicilian Defence, the Grünfeld Defence, the Simagin variation of the Nimzo-Indian Defence (1.d4 Nf6 2.c4 e6 3.Nc3 Bb4 4.e3 0-0 5.Nge2 d5 6.a3 Bd6), and Simagin's Defence (1.e4 d6 2.d4 c6 3.Nf3 Bg4). In the King's Indian Defence, the variation 1.d4 Nf6 2.c4 g6.3.g3 Bg7 4.Bg2 O-O 5.Nf3 d6 6.Nc3 Nc6 7.O-O Bg4 is known as the Simagin Variation. Simagin also experimented in the position after White's seventh move with 7...Bf5, which is known as the Lesser Simagin, while the rarer 7...Bd7 is known as the Least Simagin. While these variants of the Fianchetto Variation of the KID can lead to unique, independent positions, more often they transpose to positions similar to the more popular and flexible Panno Variation (7...a6), named after Oscar Panno.

Simagin was most highly regarded by his peers. Bronstein had some very complimentary words in his book The Sorcerer's Apprentice (co-author Tom Furstenberg). Mikhail Botvinnik, who devoted many pioneering years to computer chess research, relied on Simagin's assistance in 1966 to publish a preview article from his forthcoming book Algorithm of Chess in the Bulletin of the Central Chess Club, of which Simagin was editor. The article's publication had first met with resistance, so Botvinnik was grateful, and the article was a success.

The Russian chess writer and master Lev Khariton wrote a touching tribute to Simagin on his chesscircle.net site. Khariton had met Simagin when he was still a young junior player, and trained in a group setting with him. Khariton quotes Simagin as saying: "In chess, as in life, all the time you have to overcome obstacles. When you play a game, your opponent with each move sets up barriers before you, the barriers you have to overcome. It seems that you have overcome one barrier, but at his next move you encounter another obstacle to overcome. And it goes on all the time."

Khariton wrote that Simagin was "modest and humble, never asking anything for himself in this life, he could stand by another man when the truth was at stake. Now Simagin's name is almost forgotten, and that makes me very sad. But when I see his games, I enjoy chess as an art; I understand that Simagin was a real chess artist whose name is forever engraved in the chess annals."

== Notable games ==
Position: g8 black king, d7 white queen, f6 black pawn, f5 white pawn, b3 white king, c3 white pawn, a2 white pawn, b2 white pawn, g2 black queen, h2 black pawn, c1 white bishop

White to move.

=== Simagin vs Bronstein, Moscow 1947 ===
In this position Simagin played 1.Bg5, which was described as a "stunning" move by Lyudmil Tsvetkov. If the bishop is taken with the pawn, 1...fxg5, then 2.f6 sets up unavoidable mate in g7. If 1...Qxg5 then white can capture the black pawn on h2 with Qc8+ and Qc7+, with a winning position due to the three extra pawns on the queenside. Finally, if black queens on h1 a mating net can be prepared after 1...h1=Q 2.Qe8+ Kg7 3.Qg6+ Kf8 4. Qxf6+ Kg8 5.Qd8+

However, only the conclusion of this game has been published, with the moves for the complete game not having been found, as discussed by the British chess historian Edward Winter in his Chess Notes column.
