= Vasily Smyslov Sr. =

Russian chess player (1881–1943)

Personal information
- Native name: Василий Осипович Смыслов
- Born: Vasily Osipovich Smyslov; 1881 Astrakhan, Russian Empire
- Died: 1943 (aged 61–62)

Chess career
- Country: Russian Empire; Soviet Union

Vasily Osipovich Smyslov (Russian: Василий Осипович Смыслов; 1881–1943) was a Russian and Soviet chess master, and the father of Vasily Vasilievich Smyslov, World Chess Champion from 1957–58.

Born in Astrakhan, in the Volga Delta, he studied at the Saint Petersburg State Institute of Technology, and became an economic engineer. He was a strong chess player, and once defeated Alexander Alekhine, at St. Petersburg 1912 (Winter tournament). He finished 5th at St. Petersburg 1903 (N.A. Panchenko won) and tied for 4–6th at Moscow 1929.

== Notable games ==
Alexander Alekhine vs. Vasily Smyslov Sr., St. Petersburg, 1912, 0-1
