= Alexander Kochyev =

Russian chess grandmaster (born 1956)

Personal information
- Born: March 25, 1956 (age 70) Saint Petersburg, Russian SFSR, Soviet Union

Chess career
- Country: Russia
- Title: Grandmaster (1979)
- Peak rating: 2555 (January 1978)
- Peak ranking: No. 31 (January 1978)

Alexander Vasilyevich Kochyev (Russian: Александр Васильевич Кочиев; born March 25, 1956, in Saint Petersburg) is a Russian chess Grandmaster (1979).

In the 1970s, he was one of the youngest grandmasters in the world. In 1972, he won the Soviet Union Junior Chess Championship and in 1975, became European Junior Champion. He came 12th in the USSR Chess Championship of 1977. In 1978, he won the team silver and individual gold medal playing board two for the Soviet team at the 1st World Youth U26 Team Chess Championship. In 1979, he won the Reggio Emilia chess tournament.
