= Nikolai Riumin =

Russian chess player

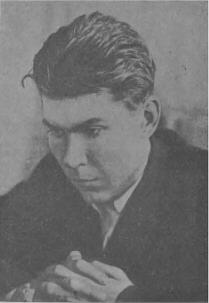
Nikolai Riumin

Nikolai (Nikolay) Nikolaevich Riumin (Ryumin, Rjumin, Rumin) (Russian: Николай Николаевич Рюмин; 5 September 1908, Moscow – 1942, Omsk) was a Soviet chess master, one of the strongest Soviet players of the 1930s.

Riumin was Moscow Champion in 1931, 1933/34, and 1935. He played in four Soviet Championships. In 1929, he took 5th in a quarter final group in Odessa (6th URS-ch; Boris Verlinsky won). In 1931, he achieved his best result, 2nd after Mikhail Botvinnik in Moscow (7th URS-ch). In 1933, he tied for 10-11th in Leningrad (8th URS-ch; Botvinnik won). In 1934/35, he tied for 3rd-4th with Fedor Bogatyrchuk, in Leningrad (9th URS-ch; Grigory Levenfish and Ilya Rabinovich won).

His best International result was at Leningrad 1934 where he shared 2nd place with Peter Romanovsky, behind Botvinnik, and ahead of Max Euwe. In 1935, he won in Gothenburg. At Moscow 1935 he tied for 11-14th (Botvinnik and Salo Flohr won). In 1936, he tied for 7-10th in Moscow (José Raúl Capablanca won). Ill-health started to affect him in 1936. It has led to significant decline in his ability to play competitively, even though he was still a young man. He died from tuberculosis during World War II in Omsk, Siberia.

Riumin's name has been attached to two chess opening variations. The Riumin Variation of the Queen's Indian Defence was analyzed by Riumin, Vladimir Alatortsev, and Andor Lilienthal: 1.d4 Nf6 2.c4 e6 3.Nf3 b6 4.g3 Bb7 5.Bg2 Bb4+ 6.Bd2 Be7. The Moscow or Rauzer Variation of the Sicilian Defence is sometimes also called the Riumin Variation: 1.e4 c5 2.Nf3 d6 3.d4 cxd4 4.Nxd4 Nf6 5.f3.
