= Vitaly Chekhover =

Soviet chess player (1908–1965)

Personal information
- Born: Vitaly Alexandrovitch Chekhover; December 22, 1908 Saint Petersburg, Russia
- Died: February 11, 1965 (aged 56) Leningrad, Soviet Union

Chess career
- Country: Russia; Soviet Union
- Title: International Master (1950)

Vitaly Alexandrovich Chekhover (also spelled Tschechower or Czechower, pronounced "chekh a VYAIR") (Russian: Вита́лий Алекса́ндрович Чехове́р) (December 22, 1908 – February 11, 1965) was a Soviet chess player and chess composer. He was also a pianist.

== Composing career ==
Vitaly Chekhover
Schachmaty w SSSR 1947

Position: a8 white king, g7 black pawn, f5 black pawn, f4 white knight, e3 black pawn, a2 black king

White to move and draw
Solution: 1. Nd5 e2 2. Nc3+ Kb3 3. Nxe2 Kc4! 4. Nf4!! g5 5. Ne6! g4 6. Ng7! f4 7. Nh5 f3 8. Nf6 g3 9. Ne4 g2 10. Nd2+

The study is often published.

In the beginning of his career as an endgame study composer, Chekhover often revised traditional studies of other authors. He strove to bring them into a more sparse and economical form, often with fewer pieces – hence focusing on the actual problem itself, rather than the position on the board. Later he found his own style and composed a number of original, independent chess studies and problems. Starting 1936, Chekhover published more than 160 endgame studies. He is considered a prominent specialist on knight endgames, and has written several books on the subject; either alone, or with coauthors such as Russian grandmaster Yuri Averbakh.

Between 1947 and 1965 he participated in the Soviet Union championship for chess composition. Chekhover twice received the title Master of Sports of the USSR. In 1956 he was awarded the title International Judge of Chess Compositions by FIDE, and received the FIDE title International Master of Chess Compositions in 1961.

== Playing career ==
Chekover was also a very successful chess player, being awarded the title of International Master in 1950 when the title was first introduced. Tournament victories include victory in the Leningrad City Chess Championship in 1937 (shared) and 1949. He won the Uzbekistani Chess Championship in 1944. He also performed credibly in a number of USSR championships

A variation of the Sicilian Defence is named after him: 1. e4 c5 2. Nf3 d6 3. d4 cxd4 4. Qxd4 (see Sicilian Defence, Chekhover Variation).

== Bibliography ==
- Chekhover, Vitaly; Averbakh, Yuri (1977). Comprehensive Chess Endings: Knight Endings. Batsford. ISBN 978-0713405521.
- Chekhover, Vitaly; Averbakh, Yuri; Henkin, V. (1978). Comprehensive Chess Endings: Queen v. Rook/Minor Piece Endings. Batsford. ISBN 978-0713408669.
