= Mikhail Tseitlin =

Belarusian-German chess grandmaster (born 1947)

Personal information
- Born: June 16, 1947 (age 79) Babruysk, Byelorussian SSR, Soviet Union

Chess career
- Country: Germany
- Title: Grandmaster (1987)
- Peak rating: 2510 (January 1978)

Mikhail Semyonovich Tseitlin (Belarusian: Міхаіл Сямёнавіч Цэйтлін; German: Michael Zeitlein; born 16 June 1947, in Babruysk) is a Belarusian chess Grandmaster, now resident in Germany.

Tseitlin was twice Moscow Champion in 1976 (jointly) and 1977. His best results in international tournaments are Pernik (1977 and 1981) - 1st and 1st - 4th place; Nałęczów (1979) - 1st-3rd; Łódź (1980) - 2nd-4th; Hradec-Kralove (1982/83) - 3rd-6th; Prague (1983 and 1985) - 1st place.

Tseitlin was awarded the International Master (IM) title in 1977 and the Grandmaster (GM) title in 1987. He received the International Correspondence Chess Grandmaster title in 1990.

== Books ==
- Tseitlin, Mikhail (1991). Winning with the Schliemann. Maxwell Macmillan Chess. ISBN 1-85744-017-X.
- Tseitlin, Mikhail; Glaskov, Igor (1992). The Budapest for the Tournament Player. Batsford. ISBN 978-0805024319.
- Tseitlin, Mikhail; Glaskov, Igor (1995). The Complete Vienna. Batsford. ISBN 978-0713476064.
