= Yuri Averbakh =

Russian chess grandmaster and author (1922–2022)

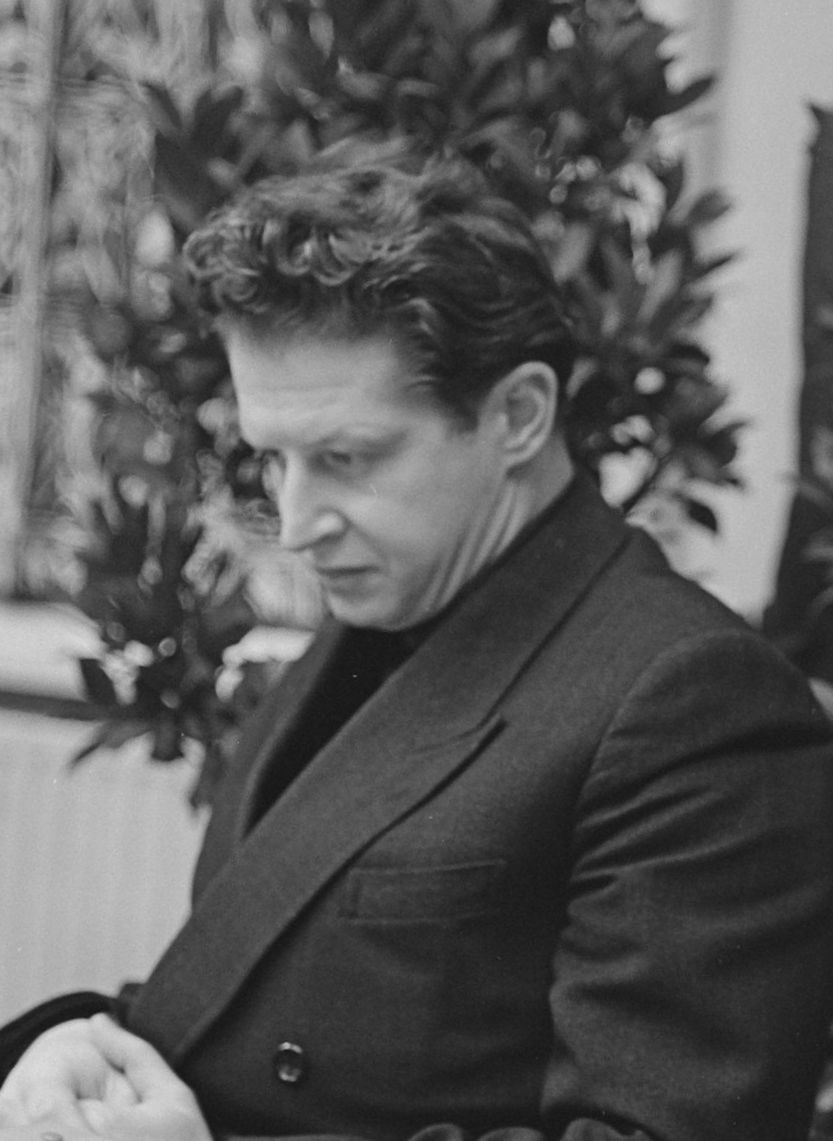
- Averbakh in 1963

Personal information
- Born: Yuri Lvovich Averbakh; 8 February 1922 Kaluga, Russian SFSR
- Died: 7 May 2022 (aged 100) Moscow, Russia

Chess career
- Country: Soviet Union (until 1991); Russia (from 1991)
- Title: Grandmaster (1952)
- Peak rating: 2550 (July 1971)
- Peak ranking: No. 32 (July 1971)

Yuri Lvovich Averbakh (Russian: Юрий Львович Авербах; 8 February 1922 – 7 May 2022) was a Russian chess grandmaster and author. He was chairman of the USSR Chess Federation from 1973 to 1978. Averbakh was the first centenarian FIDE Grandmaster. Despite his eyesight and hearing having worsened, by his 100th birthday he continued to devote time to chess-related activities.

== Early life ==
Averbakh was born on 8 February 1922 in Kaluga in the Russian SFSR. His father was German Jewish, and his ancestors were named Auerbach, meaning "meadow brook". His mother was Russian. Both sets of grandparents disapproved of their marriage because his father was likely an atheist and his mother was Eastern Orthodox, as well as the fact that his maternal grandmother died very young, so his mother was expected to look after the family. Averbakh called himself a fatalist.

== Career ==
=== Tournament successes ===
Averbakh's first major success was taking first place in the Moscow Championship of 1949, ahead of players including Andor Lilienthal, Yakov Estrin and Vladimir Simagin. He became an international grandmaster in 1952 by qualifying for the 1953 Candidates' Tournament (the last stage to determine the challenger to the World Chess Champion), finishing joint tenth of the fifteen participants. In 1954, Averbakh won the USSR Championship ahead of players including Mark Taimanov, Viktor Korchnoi, Tigran Petrosian, Efim Geller and Salo Flohr. In the 1956 Championship, he came equal first with Taimanov and Boris Spassky in the main event, finishing second after the playoff, won by Taimanov. Later Averbakh's daughter, Jane, would marry Taimanov. Averbakh's other major tournament victories included Vienna 1961 and Moscow 1962. He also qualified for the 1958 Interzonal tournament at Portorož, by finishing in fourth place at the 1958 USSR Championship at Riga. At Portorož, Averbakh wound up in a tie for seventh through eleventh places, half a point short of advancing to the Candidates' Tournament. He played in the 1993 Maccabiah Games in Israel, coming in fourth.

In February 2020, at the FIDE Congress in Abu Dhabi, Averbakh became an honorary member of FIDE.

=== Playing style ===
Averbakh's solid style was difficult for many pure attackers to overcome, as he wrote: "...Nezhmetdinov, who if he had the attack, could kill anybody, including Tal. But my score against him was something like 8½–½ because I did not give him any possibility for an active game. In such cases he would immediately start to spoil his position because he was looking for complications."

Averbakh had plus records against world champions Max Euwe and Tigran Petrosian.

=== Writings ===
Averbakh was also a major endgame study theorist. More than 100 studies were published during his lifetime, many of which have made notable contributions to endgame theory. In 1956, he was given by FIDE the title of International Judge of Chess Compositions and in 1969 that of International Arbiter.

Averbakh was also an important chess journalist and author. He edited the Soviet chess periodicals Shakhmaty v SSSR and Shakhmatny Bulletin. From 1956 to 1962 he edited (with Vitaly Chekhover and others) a four-volume anthology on the endgame, Shakhmatnye okonchaniya (revised in 1980–84 and translated as Comprehensive Chess Endings, in five volumes).

=== Openings contributions ===
Averbakh is the eponym of several opening variations.

- King's Indian Defence: Averbakh variation (E73): 1.d4 Nf6 2.c4 g6 3.Nc3 Bg7 4.e4 d6 5.Be2 0-0 6.Bg5
- King's Indian Defence: semi-Averbakh system (E73): 1.d4 Nf6 2.c4 g6 3.Nc3 Bg7 4.e4 d6 5.Be2 0-0 6.Be3
- Modern Defense: Averbakh variation (A42): 1.d4 g6 2.c4 Bg7 3.Nc3 d6 4.e4
- Ruy Lopez: Averbakh variation (C87): 1.e4 e5 2.Nf3 Nc6 3.Bb5 a6 4.Ba4 Nf6 5. 0-0 Be7 6. Re1 d6

== Death and tributes ==
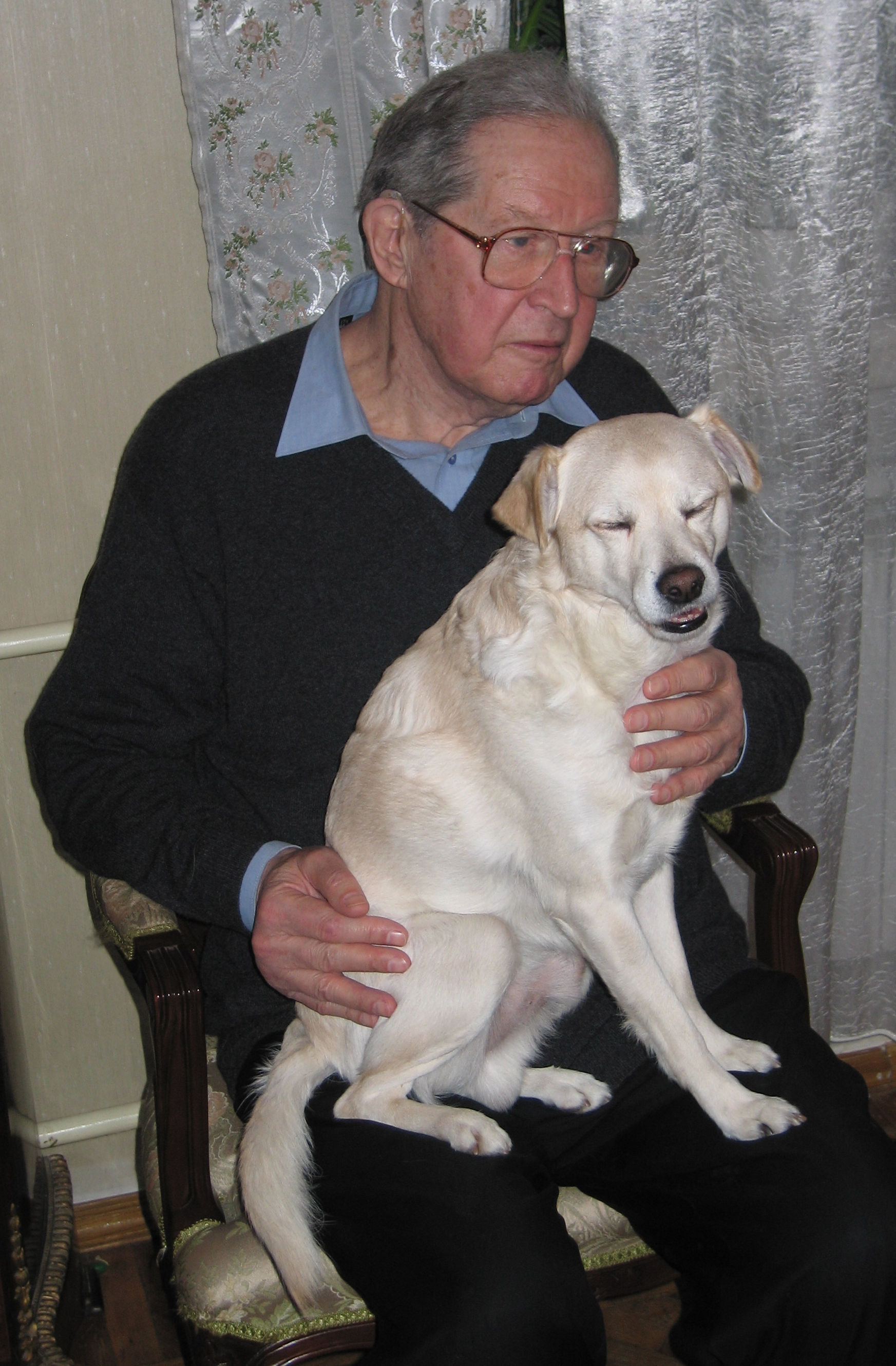
Averbakh in 2007

Averbakh died on 7 May 2022 in Moscow. Averbakh was survived by a daughter, who was married to Mark Taimanov for ten years.

He was an icon in the chess world. Apart from being the archetypal Soviet chess grandmaster, during the heyday of the USSR's chess imperium, Averbakh was the Renaissance Man of chess: a highly successful player, awarded the Grandmaster title in 1952, World Championship Candidate in 1953, Soviet Champion 1954, International Judge of chess composition (otherwise known as chess problems) in 1956, International Arbiter in 1969.

— Raymond Keene, The Article: Yuri Averbakh, 1922–2022

== Honours and awards ==
- Honoured Master of Sports of the USSR
- Order of Friendship of Peoples (1981)
- Medal "For Labour Valour" (1957)
- Medal "For Distinguished Labour" (1970)
- Jubilee Medal "In Commemoration of the 100th Anniversary since the Birth of Vladimir Il'ich Lenin" (1970)
- Russian Imperial Family: Knight Commander of the Imperial Order of Saint Stanislaus
- Order of Honor (2022)

== Books ==
- Averbakh, Yuri (1993). Chess Endings: Essential Knowledge. Everyman Chess. ISBN 978-1857440225.
- Averbakh, Yuri; Chekhover, Vitaly (1983). Comprehensive Chess Endings, Volume 1: Bishop Endings, Knight Endings. Pergamon. ISBN 978-4871875035.
- Averbakh, Yuri (1985). Comprehensive Chess Endings, Volume 2: Bishop Against Knight Endings, Rook Against Minor Piece Endings. Pergamon. ISBN 978-4871875042.
- Averbakh, Yuri; Henkin, Victor; Chekhover, Vitaly (1986). Comprehensive Chess Endings, Volume 3: Queen and Pawn Endings, Queen Against Rook Endings, Queen Against Minor Piece Endings. Pergamon. ISBN 978-4871875059.
- Averbakh, Yuri; Maizelis, Ilya (1987). Comprehensive Chess Endings, Volume 4: Pawn Endings. Pergamon. ISBN 978-4871875066.
- Averbakh, Yuri; Kopayev, Nikolai (1987). Comprehensive Chess Endings, Volume 5: Rook Endings. Pergamon. ISBN 978-4871875073.
- Averbakh, Yuri (1992). Chess Tactics for Advanced Players. Sportverlag Berlin, Chess Digest. ISBN 978-0875682181.
- Averbakh, Yuri (2012). A History of Chess: From Chaturanga to the Present Day. Russell Enterprises. ISBN 978-1936490448.
- Averbakh, Yuri; Beilin, Mikhail (2014). Journey to the Chess Kingdom. Chess Evolution. ISBN 978-8393465668.
- Averbakh, Yuri (2011). Centre-Stage and Behind the Scenes: A Personal Memoir. Alkmaar: New In Chess. ISBN 978-9056913649.
- Averbakh, Yuri (1996). Chess Middlegames: Essential Knowledge. Everyman Chess. ISBN 978-1857441253.
- Averbakh, Yuri (1998). Averbakh's Selected Games. Cadogan. ISBN 978-1857445480.
- Averbakh, Yuri (1978). Rook v. Minor Piece Endings. Batsford. ISBN 978-0713408683.
- Averbakh, Yuri; Taimanov, Mark (1986). The World Chess Championship, Karpov-Kasparov: Moscow 85. Raduga. ISBN 978-5050005533.
- Averbakh, Yuri (1980). Small Chess Dictionary. Sahovski Informator. ISBN 978-8672970128.

== See also ==
- List of Jewish chess players
