= Raphael Falk (chess player) =

Russian chess player (1856–1913)

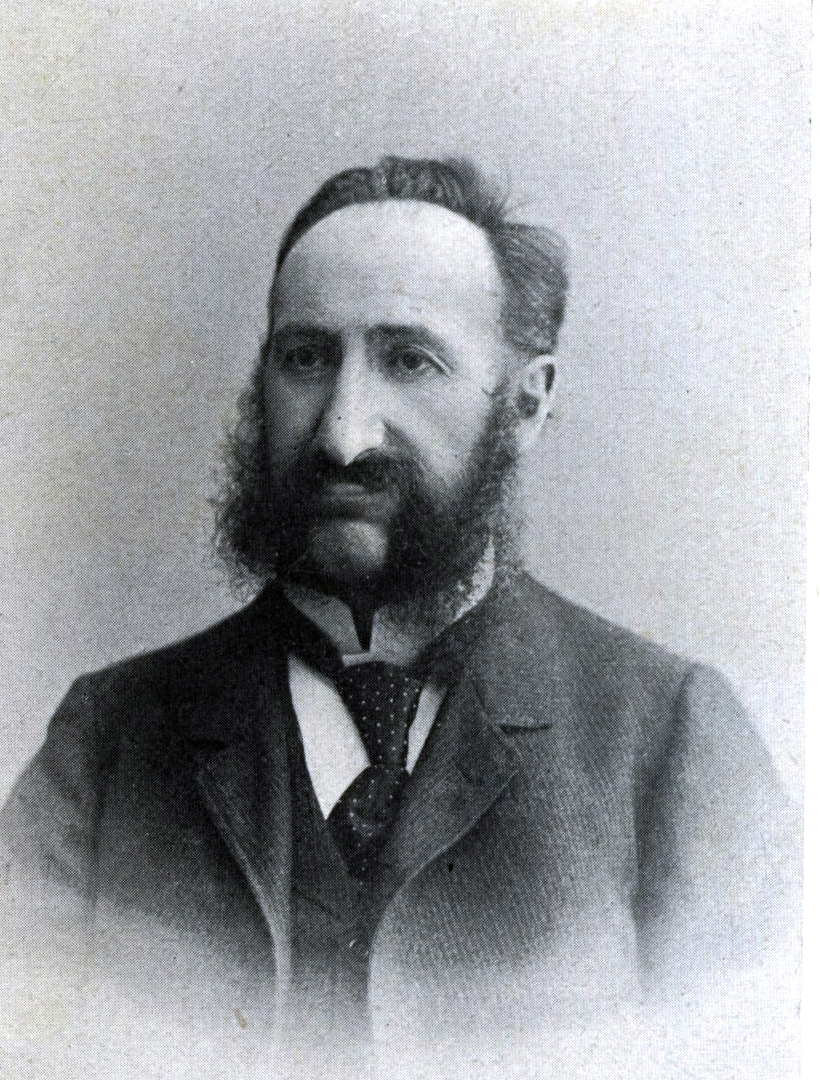
Raphael Falk

Raphael Alexandrovich Falk (Russian: Рафаил Александрович Фальк, romanized: Rafail Aleksandrovich Falk; 1856–1913) was a Russian chess master.

He took 12th at Moscow 1899 (the 1st Russian Chess Championship, Mikhail Chigorin won), shared 1st with Goncharov in Moscow City Chess Championship in 1901, and tied for 5-7th at Moscow-ch 1902 (Boyarkov won).
