= Nukhim Rashkovsky =

Russian chess grandmaster (1946–2023)

Personal information
- Born: Nukhim Nikolayevich Rashkovsky; 18 April 1946 Sverdlovsk, Russian SFSR, Soviet Union
- Died: 14 March 2023 (aged 76)

Chess career
- Country: Russia
- Title: Grandmaster (1981)
- Peak rating: 2560 (July 1995)
- Peak ranking: No. 44 (January 1981)

Nukhim (Naum) Nikolayevich Rashkovsky (Russian: Нухим (Наум) Николаевич Рашковский; 18 April 1946 – 14 March 2023) was a Russian chess Grandmaster and coach.

== Life ==
His first meaningful chess moves were played at the Sverdlovsk Palace of Pioneers, one of many training schools for talented young players in Soviet Russia.

Rashkovsky was a regular patron of the long-running Soviet Chess Championship, from his first appearance in 1972 until the event's final edition in 1991. In total, he participated eight times, his best performance occurring in 1986, when he finished in eighth place. Competing at the former Russian Championship (known as the Championship of the RSFSR), he was twice a winner, at Tula 1974 and at Novosibirsk 1976.

In 1974, Rashkovsky took part in the team championship of the Spartak Sports Society and along with Albert Kapengut, recorded the tournament's top individual performance, with a score of 5½/7. Curiously, the full results were censored by the authorities and remained so for many years, because both players had finished ahead of Tigran Petrosian and it was not thought to be in the national interest to disclose even this relatively minor failing of the ex-World Champion.

Progressing through the ranks, Rashkovsky was awarded the International Master title in 1976 and became a Grandmaster in 1980. Among his most successful international tournament results were first place at Sochi 1979, joint second place at the 1985 USSR Championship semi-final in Aktiubinsk, a share of third place at Kuibyshev 1986, a share of second at Vrnjacka Banja 1987 and another runner-up finish at Stockholm (The Rilton Cup) in 1988. His best performance occurred at the 1982 Moscow Championship, where he shared victory with David Bronstein. He was also crowned European Senior Champion in 2007, at Hockenheim, finishing level on points with Algimantas Butnorius but winning on tie-break (ahead of Mark Tseitlin and Wolfgang Uhlmann, among others).

Although less active internationally, he continued to participate in domestic competition and was player-coach for the highly successful Ural club (of Yekaterinburg) in the top Russian league and European Club Cup.

Rashkovsky was a coach and trainer at the uppermost levels of his chosen sport. Peter Svidler spoke with high regard of his tenure with the national team, remarking on his optimism and energy and the good spirits that surrounded the Olympiad camp. Less complimentary was chess commentator Vladimir Dvorkovich, who described Rashkovsky as inferior in every way to his American counterpart Yasser Seirawan, when Russia lost the Match of the New Century—the 2002 edition of the Russia (USSR) vs Rest of the World challenge matches.

In 2008, Rashkovsky was appointed Director of the Urals Chess Academy. Having started his playing career in a similar facility, he aimed to recreate the same opportunities for talented children of the present day. The Academy is not solely for chess, but will cover a range of intellectual sports development needs.

Rashkovsky died on 14 March 2023, at the age of 76.

== See also ==
- List of Jewish chess players
