= 1980 USSR Chess Championship =

Soviet chess tournament

48th USSR Chess Championship
- Location: Vilnius

Champion
- Alexander Beliavsky; Lev Psakhis

The 1980 Soviet Chess Championship was the 48th edition of USSR Chess Championship. Held from 25 December 1980 to 21 January 1981 in Vilnius. The title was won by Alexander Beliavsky and Lev Psakhis. Semifinals took place in Dnipropetrovsk, Krasnodar, Krasnoyarsk and Tallinn; The First League (also qualifying to the final) was held at Tashkent.

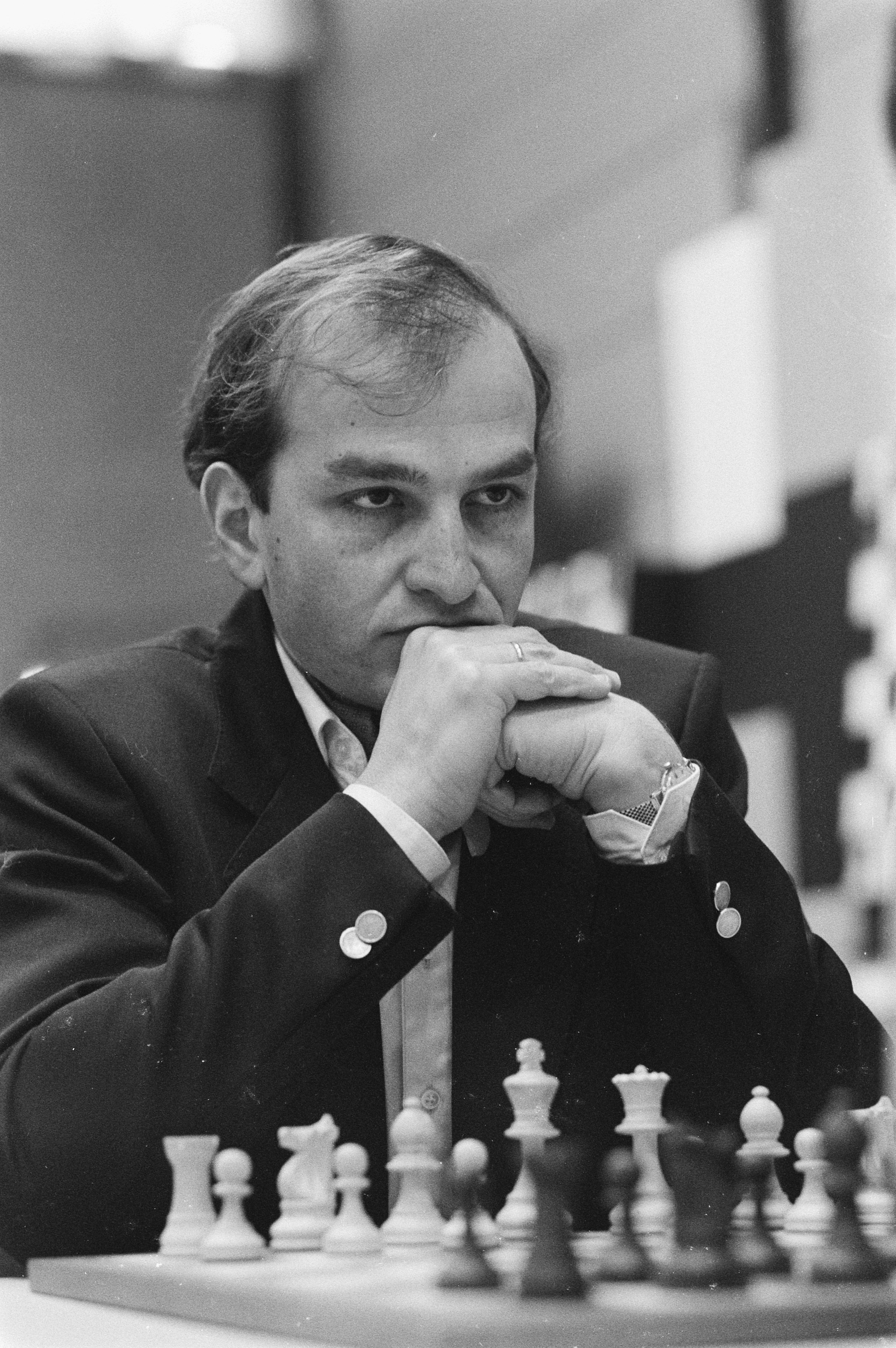
Alexander Beliavsky

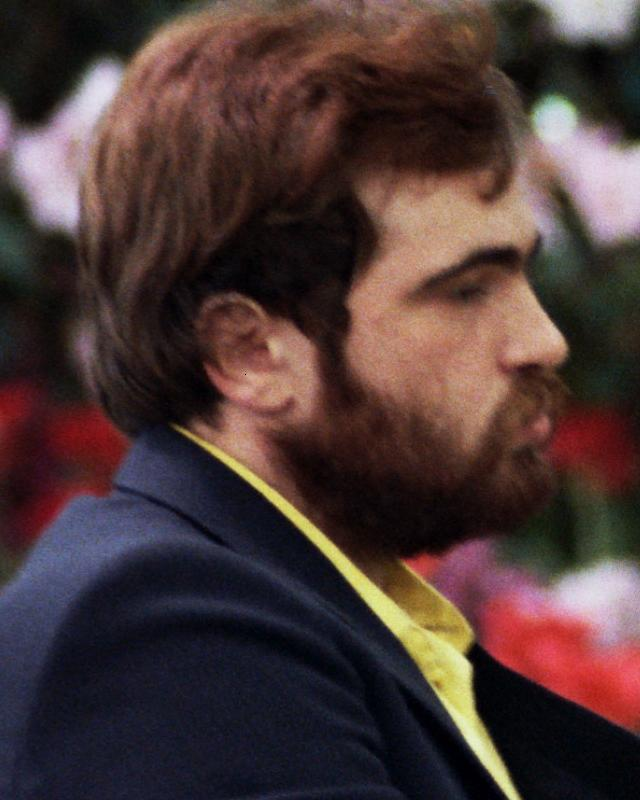
Lev Psakhis

== Qualifying ==
=== Semifinals ===
The qualifying Swiss was now split into four sections of 16 players all-play-alls, perhaps a reflection of the unpopularity of the Swiss system in Soviet circles. All four, at Dnipropetrovsk, Krasnodar, Krasnoyarsk and Tallinn, took place simultaneously in August 1980. The winners respectively were Evgeni Vasiukov, Smbat Lputian, Lev Psakhis and Valery Chekhov gaining a direct promotion to the final.

=== First League ===
The top seven qualified for the final.

Tashkent, 2-29 October 1980
	Player	Rating	1	2	3	4	5	6	7	8	9	10	11	12	13	14	15	16	17	18	Total
1	(Soviet Union) Alexander Beliavsky	2590	-	1	0	½	½	½	1	½	½	½	½	1	1	1	1	½	½	1	11½
2	(Soviet Union) Vitaly Tseshkovsky	2595	0	-	1	½	½	1	½	0	½	1	1	½	½	½	½	1	½	1	10½
3	(Soviet Union) Sergey Dolmatov	2535	1	0	-	1	0	½	½	½	1	½	1	½	0	½	1	½	1	1	10½
4	(Soviet Union) Yuri Razuvaev	2515	½	½	0	-	½	½	½	½	1	½	1	½	½	½	½	½	1	1	10
5	(Soviet Union) Gennadi Kuzmin	2530	½	½	1	½	-	½	½	0	½	½	0	1	½	½	½	1	1	1	10
6	(Soviet Union) Oleg Romanishin	2580	½	0	½	½	½	-	½	½	0	½	1	1	½	1	1	½	1	½	10
7	(Soviet Union) Nukhim Rashkovsky	2520	0	½	½	½	½	½	-	0	½	1	½	½	0	1	1	1	1	1	10
8	(Soviet Union) Evgeny Sveshnikov	2570	½	1	½	½	1	½	1	-	½	0	0	½	½	½	½	1	½	½	9½
9	(Soviet Union) Vereslav Eingorn	2470	½	½	0	0	½	1	½	½	-	½	1	½	½	0	1	1	½	1	9½
10	(Soviet Union) Josif Dorfman	2540	½	0	½	½	½	½	0	1	½	-	0	½	½	1	½	½	1	1	9
11	(Soviet Union) Konstantin Lerner	2495	½	0	0	0	1	0	½	1	0	1	-	1	½	1	0	½	1	½	8½
12	(Soviet Union) Georgy Agzamov		0	½	½	½	0	0	½	½	½	½	0	-	1	½	1	½	1	1	8½
13	(Soviet Union) Alexander Panchenko		0	½	1	½	½	½	1	½	½	½	½	0	-	1	½	½	0	0	8
14	(Soviet Union) Maia Chiburdanidze	2400	0	½	½	½	½	0	0	½	1	0	0	½	0	-	½	1	1	½	7
15	(Soviet Union) Alexander Ivanov		0	½	0	½	½	0	0	½	0	½	1	0	½	½	-	½	½	½	6
16	(Soviet Union) Vladimir Tukmakov	2560	½	0	½	½	0	½	0	0	0	½	½	½	½	0	½	-	½	½	5½
17	(Soviet Union) Igor Platonov		½	½	0	0	0	0	0	½	½	0	0	0	1	0	½	½	-	1	5
18	(Soviet Union) Fikret Sideifzade	2320	0	0	0	0	0	½	0	½	0	0	½	0	1	½	½	½	0	-	4

== Final ==
The date of the final slipped, as it did not begin at the Lithuanian capital of Vilnius until December 25th. Not really Christmas Day, in a sense, since this feast was not celebrated in the USSR. The delay was due to the 1980 Olympiad being played late in the year.

48th USSR Chess Championship
	Player	Rating	1	2	3	4	5	6	7	8	9	10	11	12	13	14	15	16	17	18	Total
1	(Soviet Union) Lev Psakhis	2535	-	1	0	½	1	½	0	1	½	0	1	1	½	½	1	1	1	0	10½
2	(Soviet Union) Alexander Beliavsky	2590	0	-	½	½	½	½	0	1	1	½	1	½	½	½	½	1	1	1	10½
3	(Soviet Union) Yuri Balashov	2600	1	½	-	½	½	½	½	½	½	1	½	½	½	½	½	1	½	½	10
4	(Soviet Union) Oleg Romanishin	2580	½	½	½	-	½	0	1	½	½	½	0	½	1	½	1	½	1	1	10
5	(Soviet Union) Artur Yusupov	2485	0	½	½	½	-	½	1	0	½	1	0	½	½	1	1	½	1	1	10
6	(Soviet Union) Sergey Dolmatov	2535	½	½	½	1	½	-	1	1	0	½	½	1	0	½	½	½	0	1	9½
7	(Soviet Union) Viktor Kupreichik	2535	1	1	½	0	0	0	-	½	1	½	0	1	½	0	1	½	1	1	9½
8	(Soviet Union) Gennadi Kuzmin	2530	0	0	½	½	1	0	½	-	½	1	½	1	1	½	1	½	½	½	9½
9	(Soviet Union) Vitaly Tseshkovsky	2595	½	0	½	½	½	1	0	½	-	½	½	1	0	1	1	½	1	½	9½
10	(Soviet Union) Rafael Vaganian	2590	1	½	0	½	0	½	½	0	½	-	½	0	1	½	1	½	1	1	9
11	(Soviet Union) Nukhim Rashkovsky	2520	0	0	½	1	1	½	1	½	½	½	-	½	½	½	½	½	½	0	8½
12	(Soviet Union) Evgeni Vasiukov	2545	0	½	½	½	½	0	0	0	0	1	½	-	½	1	½	1	1	1	8½
13	(Soviet Union) Sergey Makarichev	2495	½	½	½	0	½	1	½	0	1	0	½	½	-	½	0	½	½	½	7½
14	(Soviet Union) Efim Geller	2565	½	½	½	½	0	½	1	½	0	½	½	0	½	-	½	0	½	0	6½
15	(Soviet Union) Tamaz Giorgadze	2540	0	½	½	0	0	½	0	0	0	0	½	½	1	½	-	1	½	1	6½
16	(Soviet Union) Smbat Lputian	2445	0	0	0	½	½	½	½	½	½	½	½	0	½	1	0	-	0	½	6
17	(Soviet Union) Yuri Razuvaev	2515	0	0	½	0	0	1	0	½	0	0	½	0	½	½	½	1	-	1	6
18	(Soviet Union) Valery Chekhov	2410	1	0	½	0	0	0	0	½	½	0	1	0	½	1	0	½	0	-	5½
