= 1978 USSR Chess Championship =

Soviet chess tournament

46th USSR Chess Championship
- Location: Tbilisi

Champion
- Mikhail Tal; Vitaly Tseshkovsky

The 1978 Soviet Chess Championship was the 46th edition of USSR Chess Championship. Held from 1–27 December 1978 in Tbilisi. Mikhail Tal and Vitaly Tseshkovsky shared the title. The qualifying tournaments took place in Daugavpils and Ashkhabad. This edition marked the debut of the future world champion Garry Kasparov in the Soviet championships.

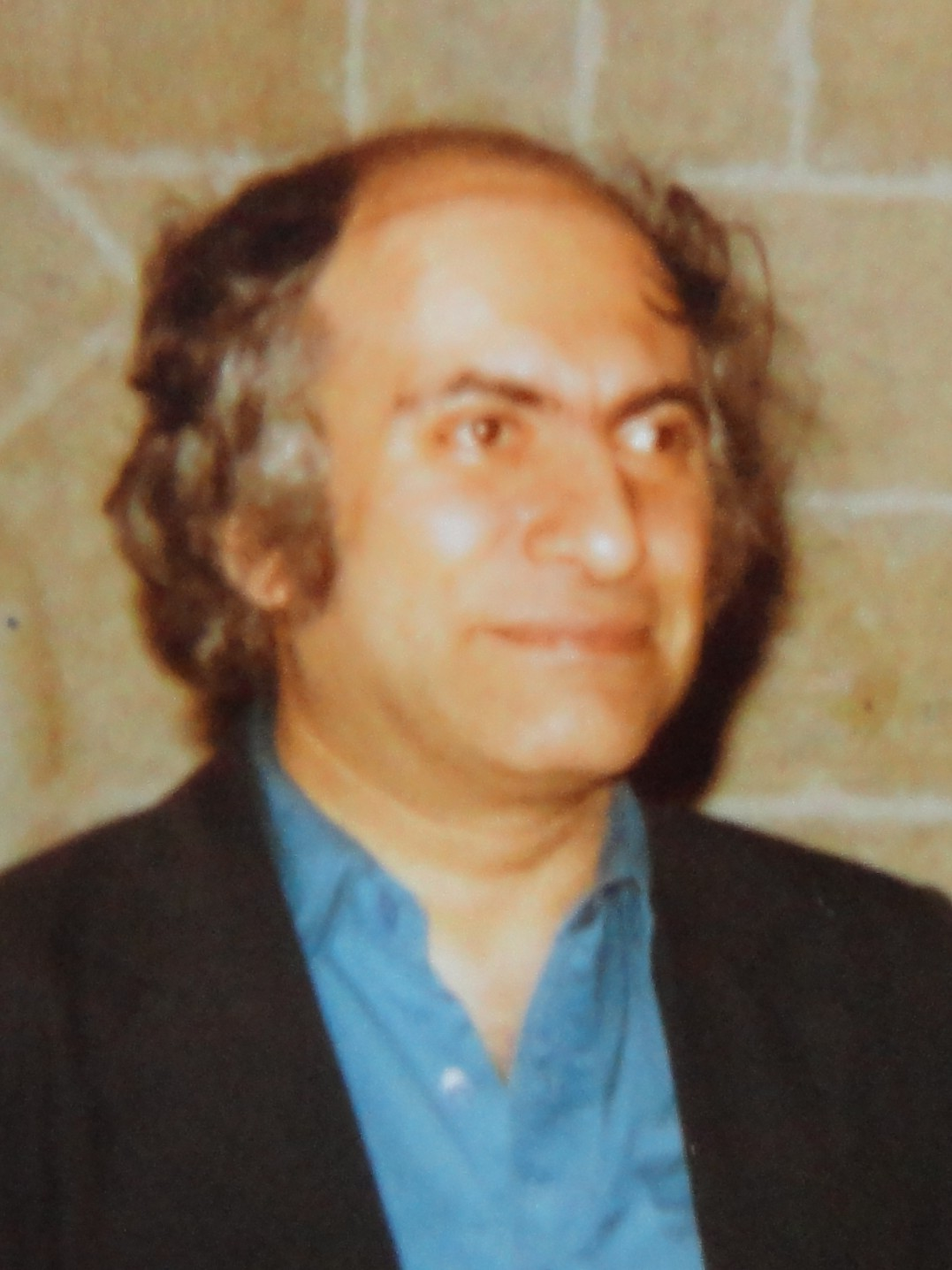
Mikhail Tal

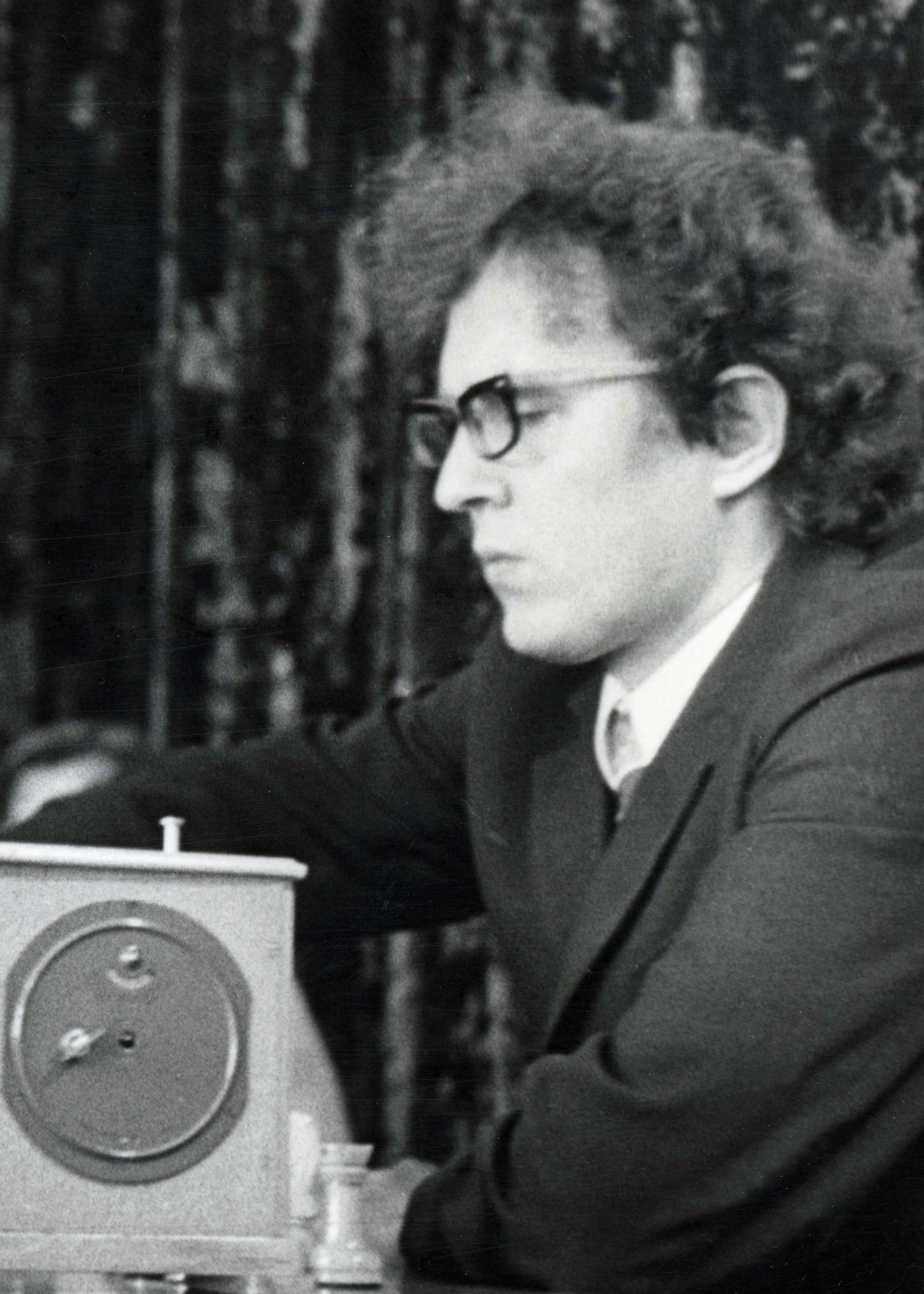
Vitaly Tseshkovsky

== Qualifying ==
=== Swiss Qualifying ===
The Swiss Qualifying was held in Daugavpils from 27 June to 16 July 1978 with 64 players. Garry Kasparov won gaining a direct promotion to the final.

=== First League ===
The top seven qualified for the final.

Ashkhabad, 8 October to 3 November 1978
	Player	Rating	1	2	3	4	5	6	7	8	9	10	11	12	13	14	15	16	17	Total
1	(Soviet Union) Vitaly Tseshkovsky	2570	-	½	1	½	½	1	1	½	½	1	1	½	½	1	0	½	½	10½
2	(Soviet Union) Vladimir Tukmakov	2560	½	-	½	½	1	½	½	½	1	½	½	1	1	½	1	½	½	10½
3	(Soviet Union) Alexander Beliavsky	2545	0	½	-	½	½	½	1	1	½	½	½	1	½	0	1	1	1	10
4	(Soviet Union) Adrian Mikhalchishin	2460	½	½	½	-	½	½	½	½	½	½	½	1	1	1	0	1	1	10
5	(Soviet Union) Sergey Makarichev	2495	½	0	½	½	-	½	½	½	½	½	1	½	1	½	½	½	1	9
6	(Soviet Union) Gennadij Timoscenko	2530	0	½	½	½	½	-	½	0	1	½	½	1	½	1	½	½	1	9
7	(Soviet Union) Yuri Razuvaev	2460	0	½	0	½	½	½	-	½	½	1	½	1	½	½	1	½	1	9
8	(Soviet Union) Artur Jussupow	2450	½	½	0	½	½	1	½	-	½	1	½	0	½	0	1	½	½	8
9	(Soviet Union) Alexander Kochyev	2555	½	0	½	½	½	0	½	½	-	0	1	1	1	0	½	½	1	8
10	(Soviet Union) Evgeny Sveshnikov	2565	0	½	½	½	½	½	0	0	1	-	½	0	½	1	1	½	1	8
11	(Soviet Union) Vladimir Savon	2560	0	½	½	½	0	½	½	½	0	½	-	1	½	1	½	½	½	7½
12	(Soviet Union) Viktor Kupreichik	2490	½	0	0	0	½	0	0	1	0	1	0	-	1	½	1	½	1	7
13	(Soviet Union) Lev Alburt	2510	½	0	½	0	0	½	½	½	0	½	½	0	-	1	1	1	0	6½
14	(Soviet Union) Lev Gutman		0	½	1	0	½	0	½	1	1	0	0	½	0	-	0	1	0	6
15	(Soviet Union) Alexander Ivanov		1	0	0	1	½	½	0	0	½	0	½	0	0	1	-	½	½	6
16	(Soviet Union) Albert Kapengut	2465	½	½	0	0	½	½	½	½	½	½	½	½	0	0	½	-	0	5½
17	(Soviet Union) Amanmurad Kakageldyev	2415	½	½	0	0	0	0	0	½	0	0	½	0	1	1	½	1	-	5½

== Final ==
The final at Tbilisi featured the qualifiers plus Tamaz Giorgadze as the local Georgian representative and the players who were entered directly for their historical performance in previous championships.

46th USSR Chess Championship
	Player	Rating	1	2	3	4	5	6	7	8	9	10	11	12	13	14	15	16	17	18	Total
1	(Soviet Union) Mikhail Tal	2625	-	½	½	½	½	1	½	½	½	½	½	1	½	1	½	½	1	1	11
2	(Soviet Union) Vitaly Tseshkovsky	2570	½	-	½	½	½	1	1	½	½	0	½	1	½	1	1	½	1	½	11
3	(Soviet Union) Lev Polugaevsky	2620	½	½	-	½	½	½	0	1	1	½	½	½	½	½	½	½	1	1	10
4	(Soviet Union) Tamaz Giorgadze	2505	½	½	½	-	½	½	½	½	½	1	½	½	½	½	1	½	½	½	9½
5	(Soviet Union) Evgeny Sveshnikov	2565	½	½	½	½	-	½	½	1	1	0	1	0	½	½	½	½	½	½	9
6	(Soviet Union) Alexander Beliavsky	2545	0	0	½	½	½	-	0	1	½	1	½	½	1	0	½	1	½	1	9
7	(Soviet Union) Garry Kasparov		½	0	1	½	½	1	-	½	½	½	½	½	½	0	0	½	1	1	9
8	(Soviet Union) Oleg Romanishin	2610	½	½	0	½	0	0	½	-	0	1	1	½	1	1	½	1	1	0	9
9	(Soviet Union) Efim Geller	2590	½	½	0	½	0	½	½	1	-	½	½	½	½	1	½	½	½	1	9
10	(Soviet Union) Boris Gulko	2575	½	1	½	0	1	0	½	0	½	-	½	½	½	½	½	½	½	½	8
11	(Soviet Union) Vladimir Bagirov	2495	½	½	½	½	0	½	½	0	½	½	-	½	½	½	½	½	½	1	8
12	(Soviet Union) Sergey Makarichev	2495	0	0	½	½	1	½	½	½	½	½	½	-	½	½	½	½	½	½	8
13	(Soviet Union) Gennadij Timoscenko	2530	½	½	½	½	½	0	½	0	½	½	½	½	-	0	½	1	½	½	7½
14	(Soviet Union) Adrian Mikhalchishin	2460	0	0	½	½	½	1	1	0	0	½	½	½	1	-	½	0	½	½	7½
15	(Soviet Union) Yuri Razuvaev	2460	½	0	½	0	½	½	1	½	½	½	½	½	½	½	-	½	½	0	7½
16	(Soviet Union) Vladimir Tukmakov	2560	½	½	½	½	½	0	½	0	½	½	½	½	0	1	½	-	½	½	7½
17	(Soviet Union) Josif Dorfman	2550	0	0	0	½	½	½	0	0	½	½	½	½	½	½	½	½	-	1	6½
18	(Soviet Union) Gennadi Kuzmin	2535	0	½	0	½	½	0	0	1	0	½	0	½	½	½	1	½	0	-	6
