= 1977 USSR Chess Championship =

Soviet chess tournament

45th USSR Chess Championship
- Location: Leningrad

Champion
- Boris Gulko; Josif Dorfman

The 1977 Soviet Chess Championship was the 45th edition of USSR Chess Championship. Held from 28 November to 22 December 1977 in Leningrad. Boris Gulko and Josif Dorfman shared the title after tying in the play-off. The qualifying tournaments took place in Bălți and Baku.

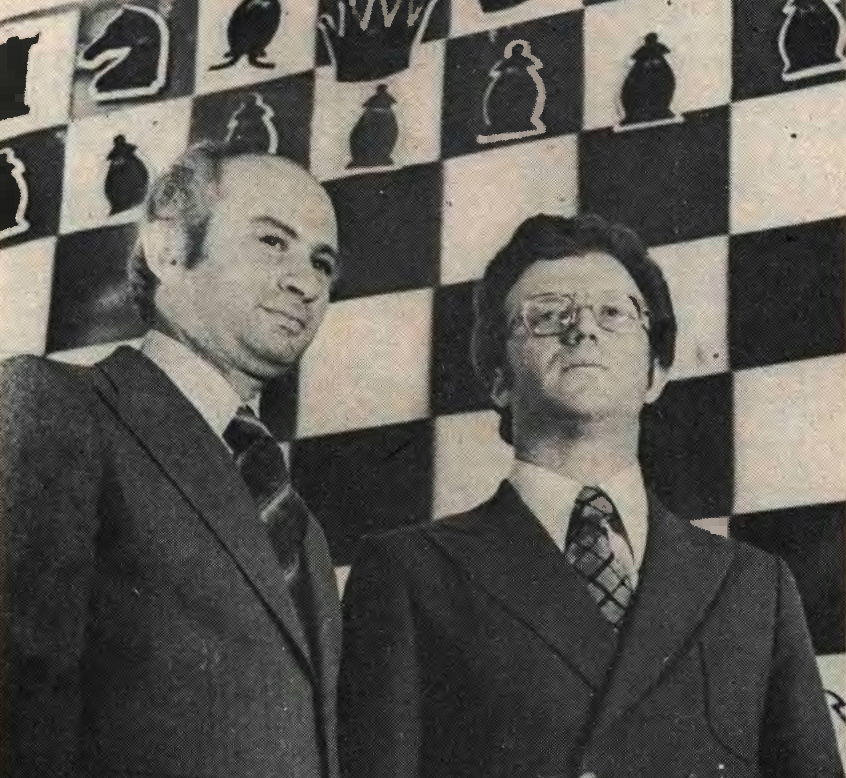
Boris Gulko and Josif Dorfman

== Qualifying ==
=== Swiss Qualifying ===
The Swiss Qualifying was held in Bălți from 25 August to 14 September 1977 with 64 players. Lev Alburt won gaining a direct promotion to the final.

=== First League ===
The top six qualified for the final.

Baku, 3-30 October 1977
	Player	Rating	1	2	3	4	5	6	7	8	9	10	11	12	13	14	15	16	17	18	Total
1	(Soviet Union) Gennadi Kuzmin	2550	-	1	½	½	½	1	1	½	½	1	½	½	1	½	½	½	1	½	11½
2	(Soviet Union) Vladimir Tukmakov	2540	0	-	½	½	1	½	½	½	0	½	1	½	1	½	1	1	1	1	11
3	(Soviet Union) Boris Gulko	2585	½	½	-	1	½	½	1	1	½	0	½	½	0	1	1	½	½	1	10½
4	(Soviet Union) Karen Grigorian	2465	½	½	0	-	½	½	1	½	½	½	½	½	½	1	1	½	1	1	10½
5	(Soviet Union) Alexander Kochyev	2490	½	0	½	½	-	½	½	½	1	½	1	½	1	½	½	½	½	½	9½
6	(Soviet Union) Vladimir Bagirov	2480	0	½	½	½	½	-	½	½	0	1	½	½	1	½	½	1	½	1	9½
7	(Soviet Union) Gennadij Timoscenko	2505	0	½	0	0	½	½	-	½	½	½	0	1	1	½	1	½	1	1	9
8	(Soviet Union) Vladimir Savon	2540	½	½	0	½	½	½	½	-	½	½	½	½	½	½	½	½	½	1	8½
9	(Soviet Union) Yuri Razuvaev	2510	½	1	½	½	0	1	½	½	-	0	½	½	0	½	½	½	0	1	8
10	(Soviet Union) Alexander Beliavsky	2555	0	½	1	½	½	0	½	½	1	-	½	1	½	0	0	½	1	0	8
11	(Soviet Union) Nukhim Rashkovsky	2510	½	0	½	½	0	½	1	½	½	½	-	½	½	½	½	½	½	½	8
12	(Soviet Union) Rafael Vaganian	2545	½	½	½	½	½	½	0	½	½	0	½	-	0	0	½	1	1	1	8
13	(Soviet Union) Lev Gutman	2395	0	0	1	½	0	0	0	½	1	½	½	1	-	1	1	½	½	0	8
14	(Soviet Union) Vitaly Tseshkovsky	2590	½	½	0	0	½	½	½	½	½	1	½	1	0	-	0	1	0	½	7½
15	(Soviet Union) Vladimir Peresipkin	2395	½	0	0	0	½	½	0	½	½	1	½	½	0	1	-	1	1	0	7½
16	(Soviet Union) Mark Taimanov	2530	½	0	½	½	½	0	½	½	½	½	½	0	½	0	0	-	½	½	6
17	(Soviet Union) Arshak Petrosian	2345	0	0	½	0	½	½	0	½	1	0	½	0	½	1	0	½	-	½	6
18	(Soviet Union) Alexander Petrushin	2345	½	0	0	0	½	0	0	0	0	1	½	0	1	½	1	½	½	-	6

== Final ==
The final at Leningrad featured the qualifiers plus the players who entered directly for the historical performance in previous championships.

45th USSR Chess Championship
	Player	Rating	1	2	3	4	5	6	7	8	9	10	11	12	13	14	15	16	Total
1	(Soviet Union) Boris Gulko	2585	-	½	½	½	½	½	½	½	1	½	1	½	1	1	½	½	9½
2	(Soviet Union) Josif Dorfman	2455	½	-	½	½	½	½	½	½	1	½	½	½	1	½	1	1	9½
3	(Soviet Union) Lev Polugaevsky	2620	½	½	-	½	½	1	1	½	1	½	1	½	½	½	0	½	9
4	(Soviet Union) Tigran Petrosian	2645	½	½	½	-	½	½	½	0	1	½	1	½	½	½	1	1	9
5	(Soviet Union) Efim Geller	2590	½	½	½	½	-	½	½	½	½	½	½	½	½	½	1	½	8
6	(Soviet Union) Mikhail Tal	2620	½	½	0	½	½	-	½	1	½	1	0	½	0	1	1	½	8
7	(Soviet Union) Vladimir Bagirov	2480	½	½	0	½	½	½	-	½	½	½	½	½	½	½	1	1	8
8	(Soviet Union) Gennadi Kuzmin	2550	½	½	½	1	½	0	½	-	½	½	½	1	½	0	½	½	7½
9	(Soviet Union) Oleg Romanishin	2595	0	0	0	0	½	½	½	½	-	½	1	1	½	1	1	½	7½
10	(Soviet Union) Evgeny Sveshnikov	2520	½	½	½	½	½	0	½	½	½	-	½	½	½	0	½	1	7
11	(Soviet Union) Yuri Balashov	2565	0	½	0	0	½	1	½	½	0	½	-	1	½	½	½	1	7
12	(Soviet Union) Alexander Kochyev	2490	½	½	½	½	½	½	½	0	0	½	0	-	1	½	½	½	6½
13	(Soviet Union) Vassily Smyslov	2595	0	0	½	½	½	1	½	½	½	½	½	0	-	1	0	½	6½
14	(Soviet Union) Vladimir Tukmakov	2540	0	½	½	½	½	0	½	1	0	1	½	½	0	-	½	½	6½
15	(Soviet Union) Karen Grigorian	2465	½	0	1	0	0	0	0	½	0	½	½	½	1	½	-	½	5½
16	(Soviet Union) Lev Alburt	2505	½	0	½	0	½	½	0	½	½	0	0	½	½	½	½	-	5

=== Play-off ===
Moscow
Player	Rating	1	2	3	4	5	6	Total
(Soviet Union) Boris Gulko	2575	½	1	½	0	½	½	3
(Soviet Union) Josif Dorfman	2550	½	0	½	1	½	½	3
