= 1981 USSR Chess Championship =

Chess Championship in Soviet USSR 1981

49th USSR Chess Championship
- Location: Bishkek

Champion
- Garry Kasparov; Lev Psakhis

The 1981 Soviet Chess Championship was the 49th edition of USSR Chess Championship. Held from 27 November to 22 December 1981 in Bishkek. The title was won by Garry Kasparov and Lev Psakhis. Semifinals took place in Bălți, Cheliabinsk, Nikolayev and Saratov; The First League (also qualifying to the final) was held at Volgodonsk.

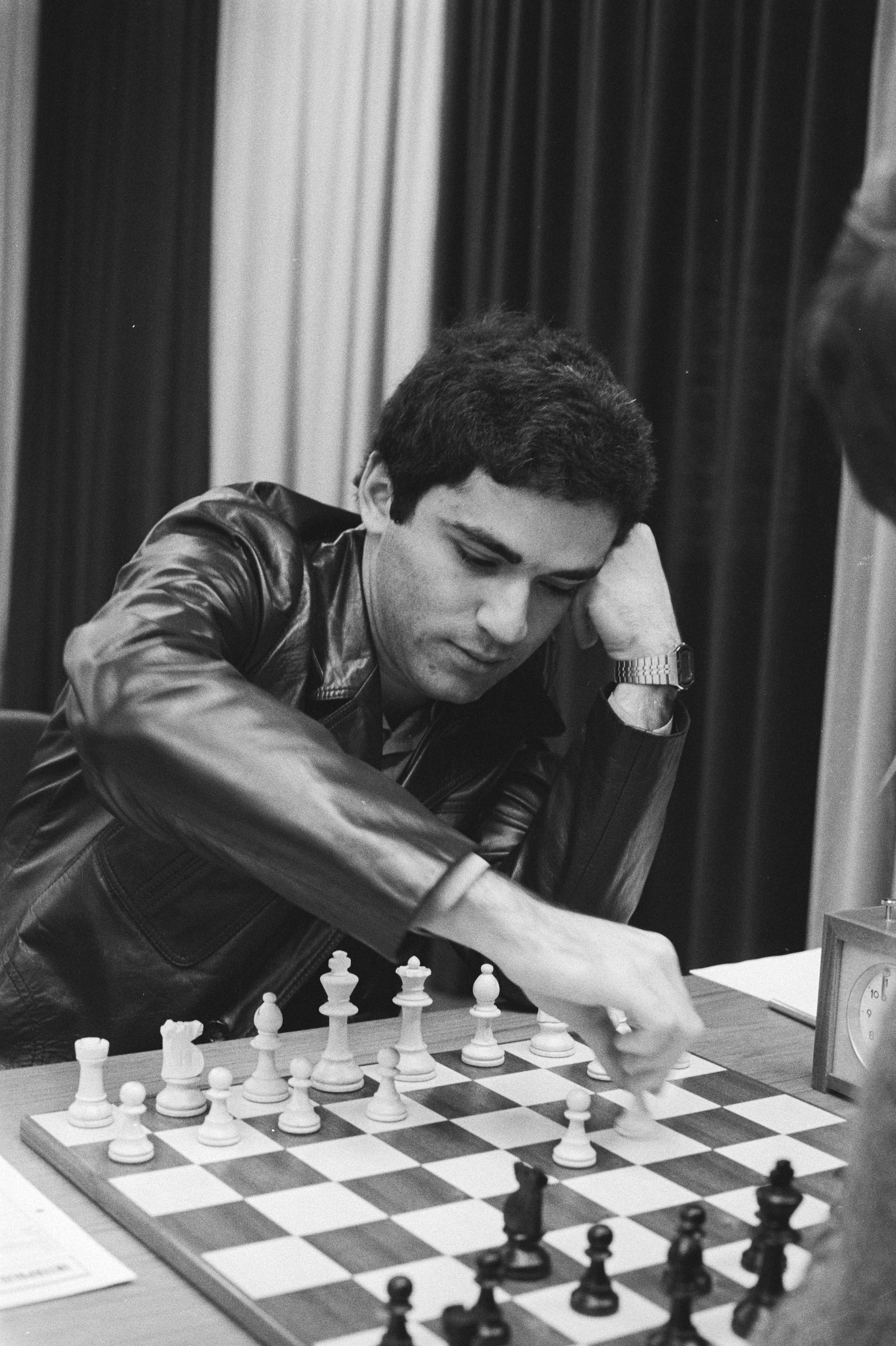
Garry Kasparov

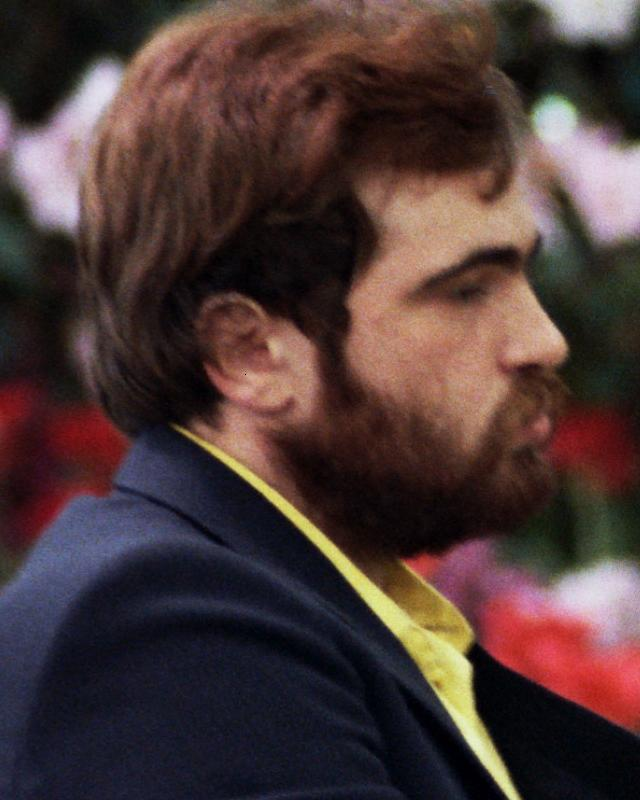
Lev Psakhis

== Qualifying ==
=== Semifinals ===
Semifinals took place at Bălți, Cheliabinsk, Nikolayev and Saratov in July 1981. The winners respectively were Viktor Gavrikov, Leonid Yudasin, Vladimir Tukmakov and Georgy Agzamov gaining a direct promotion to the final.

=== First League ===
The top five qualified for the final.

Volgodonsk, October 1981
	Player	Rating	1	2	3	4	5	6	7	8	9	10	11	12	13	14	15	16	17	18	Total
1	(Soviet Union) Boris Gulko	2590	-	1	½	½	1	½	½	1	1	1	½	½	0	½	½	½	½	½	10½
2	(Soviet Union) Adrian Mikhalchishin	2535	0	-	½	½	½	1	½	½	1	½	1	½	½	½	½	½	1	½	10
3	(Soviet Union) Gennadij Timoscenko	2510	½	½	-	½	½	½	½	½	0	½	½	½	1	1	1	½	1	½	10
4	(Soviet Union) Josif Dorfman	2505	½	½	½	-	1	0	½	½	½	½	½	½	½	½	1	½	1	1	10
5	(Soviet Union) Evgeny Sveshnikov	2535	0	½	½	0	-	0	1	½	1	½	½	1	½	½	½	½	1	1	9½
6	(Soviet Union) Yuri Anikaev	2425	½	0	½	1	1	-	½	½	½	½	½	½	½	0	½	½	1	½	9
7	(Soviet Union) Zurab Azmaiparashvili		½	½	½	½	0	½	-	½	½	1	½	½	½	½	½	½	½	1	9
8	(Soviet Union) Nukhim Rashkovsky	2535	0	½	½	½	½	½	½	-	½	1	½	1	0	½	½	½	½	1	9
9	(Soviet Union) Evgeni Vasiukov	2545	0	0	1	½	0	½	½	½	-	½	½	½	½	1	½	1	½	1	9
10	(Soviet Union) Bukhuti Gurgenidze	2490	0	½	½	½	½	½	0	0	½	-	0	½	1	1	½	1	1	1	9
11	(Soviet Union) Andrei Kharitonov		½	0	½	½	½	½	½	½	½	1	-	½	½	½	½	½	½	½	8½
12	(Soviet Union) Alex Yermolinsky	2455	½	½	½	½	0	½	½	0	½	½	½	-	1	½	½	½	1	½	8½
13	(Soviet Union) Sergey Gorelov	2415	1	½	0	½	½	½	½	1	½	0	½	0	-	½	½	1	0	½	8
14	(Soviet Union) Yevgeniy Vladimirov	2445	½	½	0	½	½	1	½	½	0	0	½	½	½	-	½	½	1	½	8
15	(Soviet Union) Alexander Chernin	2470	½	½	0	0	½	½	½	½	½	½	½	½	½	½	-	½	0	1	7½
16	(Soviet Union) Eduard Gufeld	2515	½	½	½	½	½	½	½	½	0	0	½	½	0	½	½	-	½	½	7
17	(Soviet Union) Elizbar Ubilava	2455	½	0	0	0	0	0	½	½	½	0	½	0	1	0	1	½	-	1	6
18	(Soviet Union) Arkady Novopashin	2380	½	½	½	0	0	½	0	0	0	0	½	½	½	½	0	½	0	-	4½

== Final ==
49th USSR Chess Championship
	Player	Rating	1	2	3	4	5	6	7	8	9	10	11	12	13	14	15	16	17	18	Total
1	(Soviet Union) Garry Kasparov	2630	-	0	½	1	1	½	1	1	1	½	1	½	1	1	0	½	1	1	12½
2	(Soviet Union) Lev Psakhis	2500	1	-	1	1	½	½	1	0	½	½	½	1	½	1	1	½	1	1	12½
3	(Soviet Union) Oleg Romanishin	2595	½	0	-	½	½	1	1	½	0	1	½	½	½	½	0	1	1	1	10
4	(Soviet Union) Vladimir Tukmakov	2480	0	0	½	-	½	0	½	1	½	½	½	1	½	1	1	½	½	1	9½
5	(Soviet Union) Viktor Gavrikov	2365	0	½	½	½	-	½	½	½	1	½	½	0	1	1	1	½	½	½	9½
6	(Soviet Union) Georgy Agzamov		½	½	0	1	½	-	½	½	½	1	1	0	½	0	1	½	1	0	9
7	(Soviet Union) Alexander Beliavsky	2620	0	0	0	½	½	½	-	1	½	½	1	0	½	1	1	1	½	½	9
8	(Soviet Union) Artur Yusupov	2575	0	1	½	0	½	½	0	-	½	0	1	1	0	1	½	1	0	1	8½
9	(Soviet Union) Josif Dorfman	2505	0	½	1	½	0	½	½	½	-	1	½	0	½	½	½	½	1	½	8½
10	(Soviet Union) Evgeny Sveshnikov	2535	½	½	0	½	½	0	½	1	0	-	0	1	½	1	½	½	½	½	8
11	(Soviet Union) Vitaly Tseshkovsky	2530	0	½	½	½	½	0	0	0	½	1	-	1	½	½	1	0	½	1	8
12	(Soviet Union) Viktor Kupreichik	2575	½	0	½	0	1	1	1	0	1	0	0	-	½	0	1	½	½	½	8
13	(Soviet Union) Sergey Dolmatov	2545	0	½	½	½	0	½	½	1	½	½	½	½	-	0	½	1	½	½	8
14	(Soviet Union) Leonid Yudasin	2365	0	0	½	0	0	1	0	0	½	0	½	1	1	-	1	½	1	½	7½
15	(Soviet Union) Boris Gulko	2590	1	0	1	0	0	0	0	½	½	½	0	0	½	0	-	1	1	½	6½
16	(Soviet Union) Gennadi Kuzmin	2545	½	½	0	½	½	½	0	0	½	½	1	½	0	½	0	-	0	1	6½
17	(Soviet Union) Gennadij Timoscenko	2510	0	0	0	½	½	0	½	1	0	½	½	½	½	0	0	1	-	½	6
18	(Soviet Union) Adrian Mikhalchishin	2535	0	0	0	0	½	1	½	0	½	½	0	½	½	½	½	0	½	-	5½
