= 1974 USSR Chess Championship =

Soviet chess tournament

42nd USSR Chess Championship
- Location: Leningrad

Champion
- Alexander Beliavsky; Mikhail Tal

The 1974 Soviet Chess Championship was the 42nd edition of USSR Chess Championship. Held from 30 November to 23 December 1974 in Leningrad. The tournament was won by Alexander Beliavsky and Mikhail Tal.

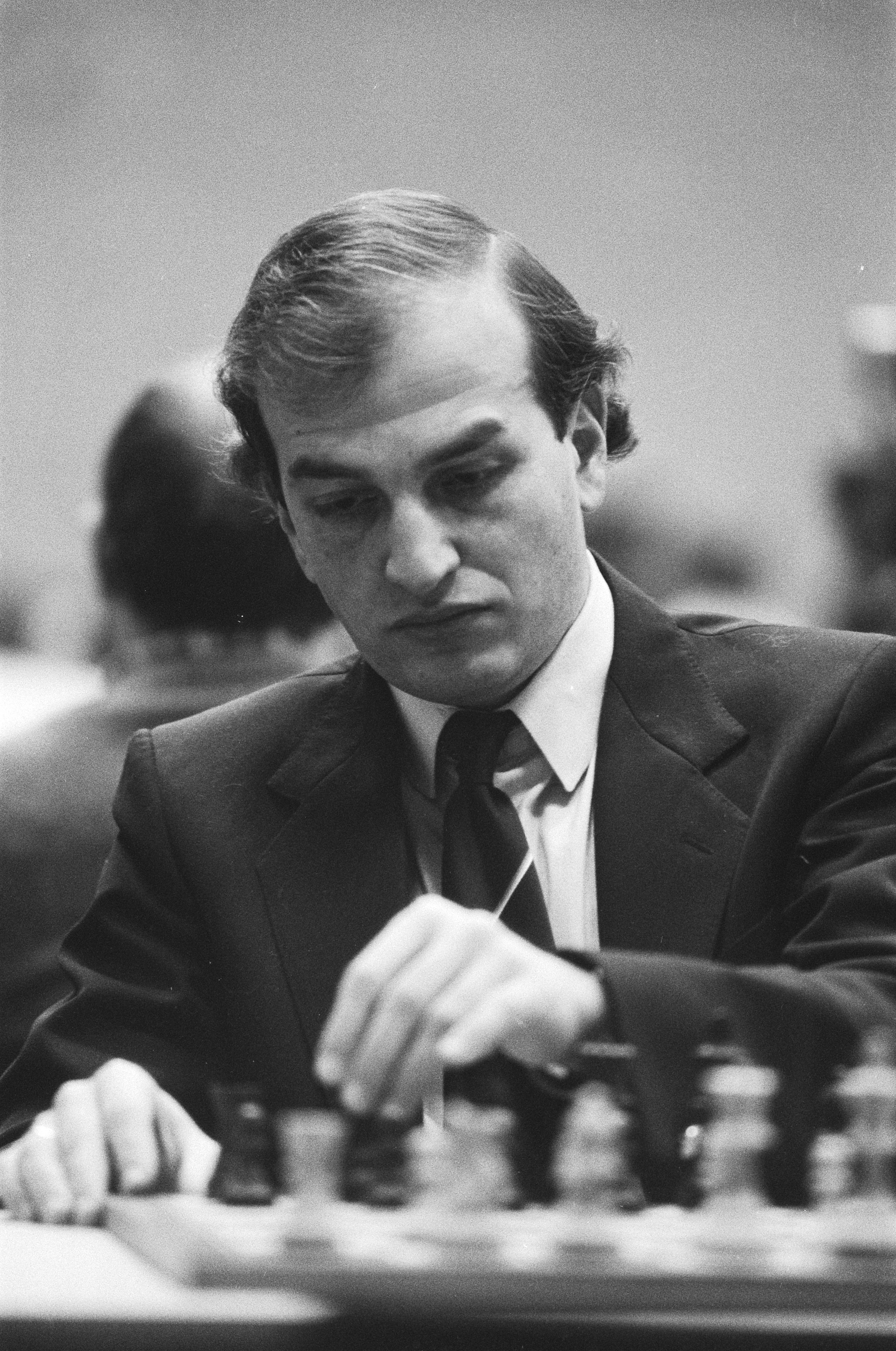
Alexander Beliavsky

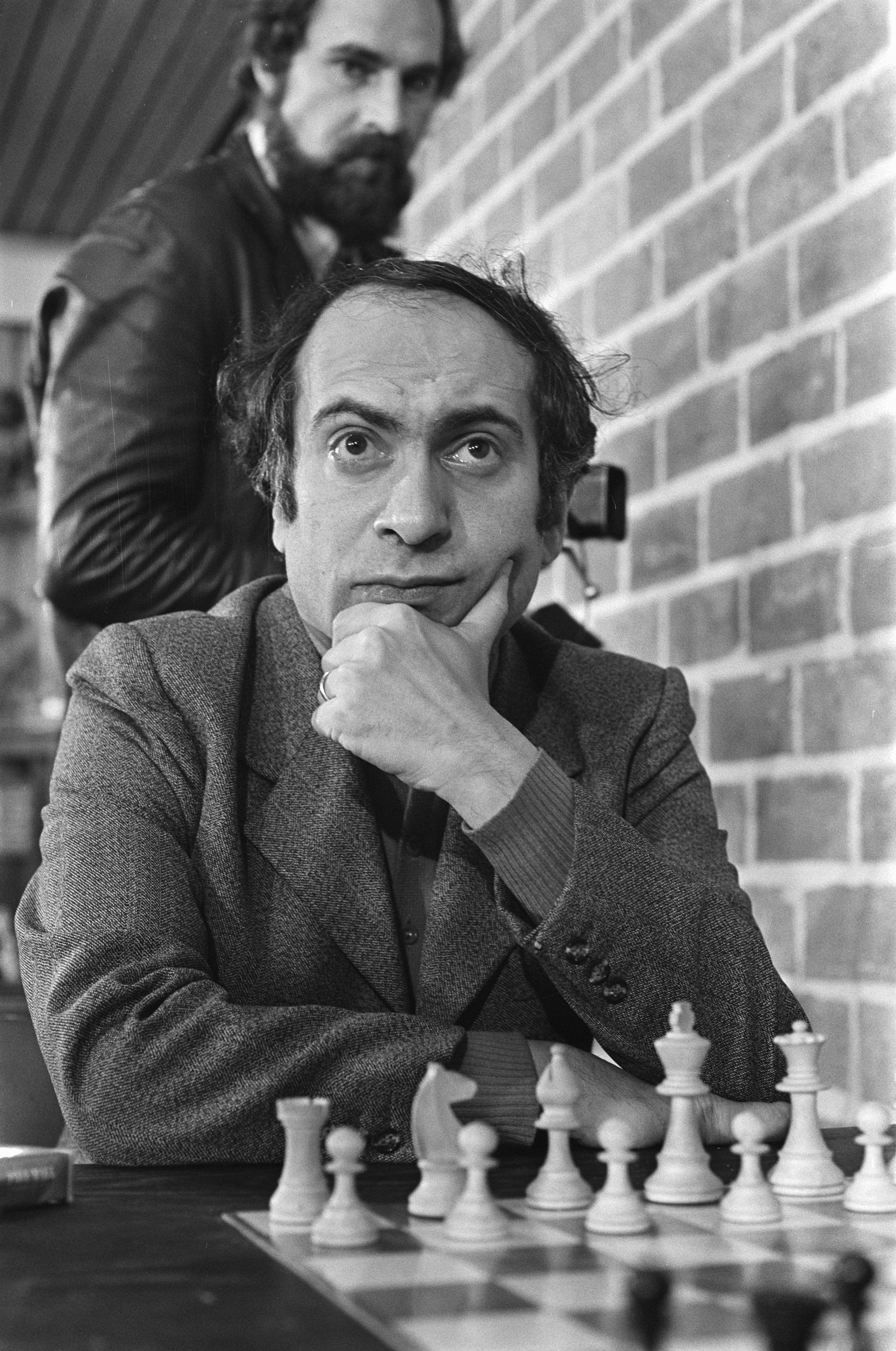
Mikhail Tal

== Table and results ==
42nd USSR Chess Championship
	Player	1	2	3	4	5	6	7	8	9	10	11	12	13	14	15	16	Total
1	(Soviet Union) Alexander Beliavsky	-	1	0	1	½	½	1	½	1	0	1	½	½	½	½	1	9½
2	(Soviet Union) Mikhail Tal	0	-	0	½	½	1	½	1	½	½	1	½	½	1	1	1	9½
3	(Soviet Union) Lev Polugaevsky	1	1	-	½	0	½	½	½	½	1	½	½	0	1	½	1	9
4	(Soviet Union) Rafael Vaganian	0	½	½	-	0	½	½	1	1	½	0	½	1	1	1	1	9
5	(Soviet Union) Oleg Romanishin	½	½	1	1	-	½	½	0	½	0	½	1	½	0	1	1	8½
6	(Soviet Union) Mark Dvoretsky	½	0	½	½	½	-	½	½	½	1	½	½	½	½	1	1	8½
7	(Soviet Union) Lev Alburt	0	½	½	½	½	½	-	½	½	1	½	½	1	½	½	1	8½
8	(Soviet Union) Yuri Balashov	½	0	½	0	1	½	½	-	½	½	½	½	1	½	½	1	8
9	(Soviet Union) Gennadi Kuzmin	0	½	½	0	½	½	½	½	-	½	½	½	½	½	1	1	7½
10	(Soviet Union) Evgeni Vasiukov	1	½	0	½	1	0	0	½	½	-	1	1	½	½	0	0	7
11	(Soviet Union) Vitaly Tseshkovsky	0	0	½	1	½	½	½	½	½	0	-	½	1	½	0	1	7
12	(Soviet Union) Vladimir Savon	½	½	½	½	0	½	½	½	½	0	½	-	½	1	½	0	6½
13	(Soviet Union) Karen Grigorian	½	½	1	0	½	½	0	0	½	½	0	½	-	1	½	0	6
14	(Soviet Union) Mark Taimanov	½	0	0	0	1	½	½	½	½	½	½	0	0	-	1	½	6
15	(Soviet Union) Boris Gulko	½	0	½	0	0	0	½	½	0	1	1	½	½	0	-	1	6
16	(Soviet Union) Viktor Kupreichik	0	0	0	0	0	0	0	0	0	1	0	1	1	½	0	-	3½
