= 1958 USSR Chess Championship =

Soviet chess tournament

25th Soviet Chess Championship (1958)
- Location: Riga

Champion
- Mikhail Tal

The 1958 Soviet Chess Championship was the 25th edition of USSR Chess Championship, held from 12 January to 14 February 1958 in Riga. The tournament was won by Mikhail Tal. The final was preceded by quarterfinals events at Tbilisi (won by Mark Taimanov, 16½ points in 19 games), Minsk (Aivar Gipslis, 14½/19) and Ashkhabad (A. Miroshnichenko, 13½/19); semifinals at Leningrad (Boris Spassky, 12½/19), Sverdlovsk (Viktor Korchnoi, 13½/19) and Kiev (Tigran Petrosian, 12½/19).

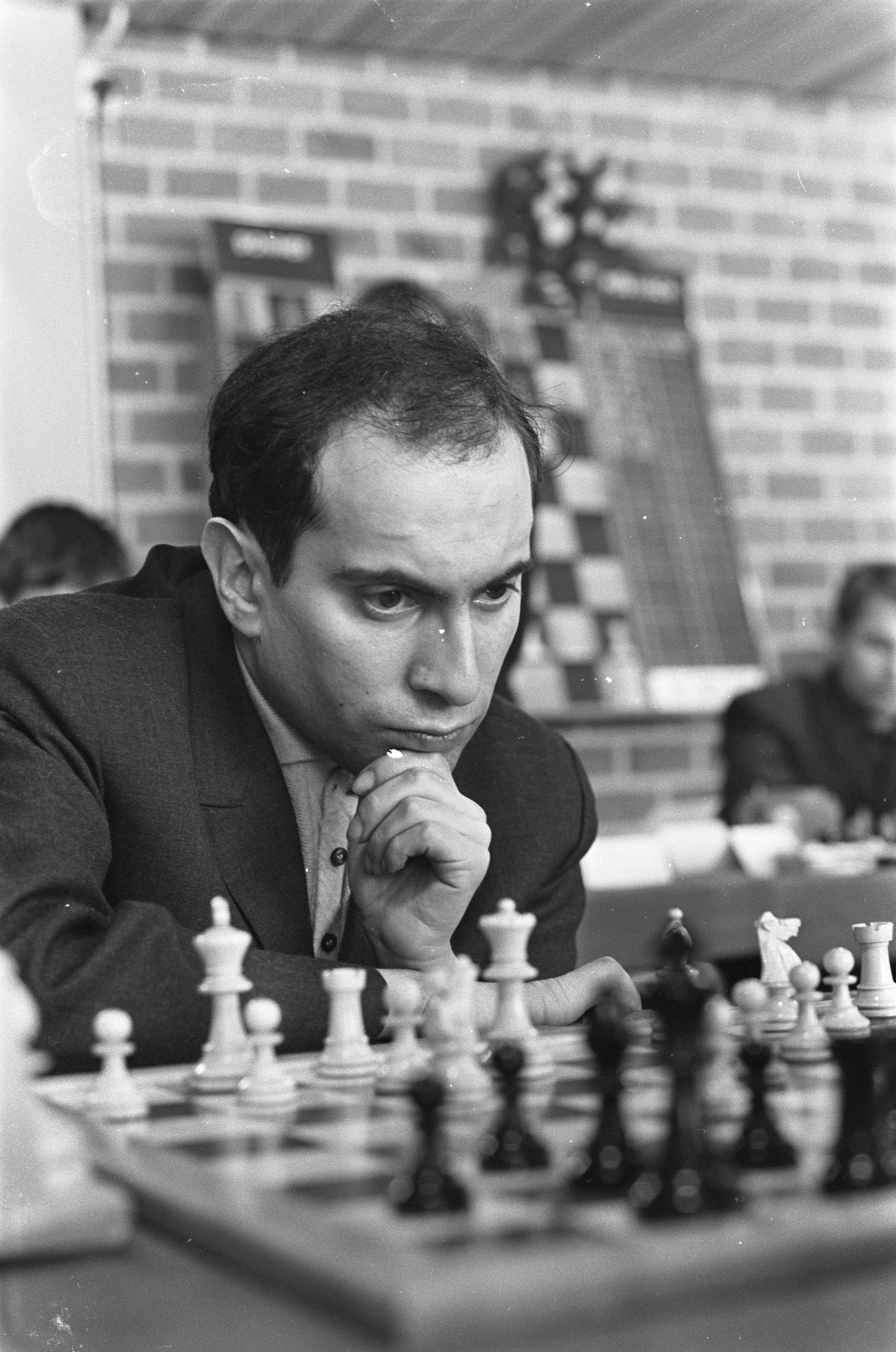
Mikhail Tal

The championship was also a zonal, with the first four finishers (Tal, Petrosian, Averbakh and Bronstein) qualifying for the 1958 Interzonal.

== Table and results ==
=== Semifinals ===
Kiev Semifinal, 25th Soviet Chess Championship
	Player	1	2	3	4	5	6	7	8	9	10	11	12	13	14	15	16	17	18	19	20	Total
1	(Soviet Union) Tigran Petrosian	-	½	½	½	½	½	½	0	1	1	½	½	1	1	½	½	1	1	½	1	12½
2	(Soviet Union) Anatoly Bannik	½	-	½	½	½	1	½	1	0	0	0	1	1	½	1	½	½	½	1	1	11½
3	(Soviet Union) Efim Geller	½	½	-	½	½	½	½	½	½	1	½	0	1	½	1	½	½	1	1	½	11½
4	(Soviet Union) Semyon Furman	½	½	½	-	½	½	½	½	1	½	1	½	½	0	½	½	1	1	1	½	11½
5	(Soviet Union) Isaac Boleslavsky	½	½	½	½	-	½	0	½	½	½	1	1	½	½	1	½	½	1	1	½	11½
6	(Soviet Union) Alexander Kotov	½	0	½	½	½	-	½	½	½	½	1	0	1	1	½	½	1	0	1	1	11
7	(Soviet Union) Evgeni Vasiukov	½	½	½	½	1	½	-	½	½	½	0	1	0	1	½	½	0	1	½	1	10½
8	(Soviet Union) Aron Reshko	1	0	½	½	½	½	½	-	½	½	0	½	1	0	1	1	½	½	0	1	10
9	(Soviet Union) Vladislav Shianovsky	0	1	½	0	½	½	½	½	-	1	0	½	0	1	0	1	½	1	½	1	10
10	(Soviet Union) Grigory Goldberg	0	1	0	½	½	½	½	½	0	-	1	0	½	½	1	1	0	½	1	1	10
11	(Soviet Union) Rashid Nezhmetdinov	½	1	½	0	0	0	1	1	1	0	-	½	1	1	1	1	0	0	0	0	9½
12	(Soviet Union) Mikhail Osmolovsky	½	0	1	½	0	1	0	½	½	1	½	-	0	½	0	0	1	1	1	½	9½
13	(Soviet Union) Vladas Mikenas	0	0	0	½	½	0	1	0	1	½	0	1	-	½	0	1	1	1	1	½	9½
14	(Soviet Union) Yuri Sakharov	0	½	½	1	½	0	0	1	0	½	0	½	½	-	1	½	½	0	1	1	9
15	(Soviet Union) Alexander Chistiakov	½	0	0	½	0	½	½	0	1	0	0	1	1	0	-	½	1	1	0	1	8½
16	(Soviet Union) Alexey Sokolsky	½	½	½	½	½	½	½	0	0	0	0	1	0	½	½	-	0	1	½	1	8
17	(Soviet Union) Abram Khasin	0	½	½	0	½	0	1	½	½	1	1	0	0	½	0	1	-	½	0	0	7½
18	(Soviet Union) Yuri Nikolaevsky	0	½	0	0	0	1	0	½	0	½	1	0	0	1	0	0	½	-	1	½	6½
19	(Soviet Union) Alexander Blagidze	½	0	0	0	0	0	½	1	½	0	1	0	0	0	1	½	1	0	-	0	6
20	(Soviet Union) Georgy Bastrikov	0	0	½	½	½	0	0	0	0	0	1	½	½	0	0	0	1	½	1	-	6

Leningrad Semifinal, 25th Soviet Chess Championship
	Player	1	2	3	4	5	6	7	8	9	10	11	12	13	14	15	16	17	18	19	20	Total
1	(Soviet Union) Boris Spassky	-	½	½	1	1	½	½	½	½	1	½	½	½	1	½	1	1	½	1	0	12½
2	(Soviet Union) Alexander Tolush	½	-	½	0	½	½	1	½	0	½	1	½	0	1	1	1	1	1	1	1	12½
3	(Soviet Union) Mark Taimanov	½	½	-	½	½	1	½	½	½	0	½	½	1	1	½	½	1	1	½	1	12
4	(Soviet Union) Lev Aronin	0	1	½	-	½	½	½	½	½	½	½	½	1	½	½	1	1	1	1	½	12
5	(Soviet Union) Nikolai Krogius	0	½	½	½	-	½	½	½	½	1	1	1	½	½	1	½	½	½	½	1	11½
6	(Soviet Union) Alexey Suetin	½	½	0	½	½	-	½	1	½	1	½	½	1	½	½	½	½	1	1	½	11½
7	(Soviet Union) Vladimir Antoshin	½	0	½	½	½	½	-	½	1	0	1	½	½	0	1	1	1	1	½	1	11½
8	(Soviet Union) Alexander Nikitin	½	½	½	½	½	0	½	-	½	0	½	½	1	1	1	½	½	1	½	1	11
9	(Soviet Union) Leonid Shamkovich	½	1	½	½	½	½	0	½	-	1	0	1	0	0	1	½	0	1	1	1	10½
10	(Soviet Union) Samuel Zhukhovitsky	0	½	1	½	0	0	1	1	0	-	1	1	1	0	1	0	½	0	½	1	10
11	(Soviet Union) Grigory Ravinsky	½	0	½	½	0	½	0	½	1	0	-	1	½	1	½	½	1	0	1	½	9½
12	(Soviet Union) Alexander Cherepkov	½	½	½	½	0	½	½	½	0	0	0	-	0	1	½	½	1	1	1	1	9½
13	(Soviet Union) Vladimir Bykov	½	1	0	0	½	0	½	0	1	0	½	1	-	½	0	½	½	½	1	1	9
14	(Soviet Union) Viacheslav Ragozin	0	0	0	½	½	½	1	0	1	1	0	0	½	-	1	0	½	0	1	1	8½
15	(Soviet Union) Yakov Estrin	½	0	½	½	0	½	0	0	0	0	½	½	1	0	-	½	1	1	1	1	8½
16	(Soviet Union) Efim Stoliar	0	0	½	0	½	½	0	½	½	1	½	½	½	1	½	-	0	½	½	0	7½
17	(Soviet Union) Konstantin Klaman	0	0	0	0	½	½	0	½	1	½	0	0	½	½	0	1	-	1	0	1	7
18	(Soviet Union) Israel Zilber	½	0	0	0	½	0	0	0	0	1	1	0	½	1	0	½	0	-	½	½	6
19	(Soviet Union) Abram Poliak	0	0	½	0	½	0	½	½	0	½	0	0	0	0	0	½	1	½	-	½	5
20	(Soviet Union) Eduard Mnatsakanian	1	0	0	½	0	½	0	0	0	0	½	0	0	0	0	1	0	½	½	-	4½

Sverdlovsk Semifinal, 25th Soviet Chess Championship
	Player	1	2	3	4	5	6	7	8	9	10	11	12	13	14	15	16	17	18	19	20	Total
1	(Soviet Union) Viktor Korchnoi	-	½	1	½	1	½	½	½	1	½	1	1	½	½	½	1	½	1	1	½	13½
2	(Soviet Union) Lev Polugaevsky	½	-	½	1	½	½	½	1	1	½	½	1	½	½	½	½	1	½	½	½	12
3	(Soviet Union) Bukhuti Gurgenidze	0	½	-	½	½	0	½	0	1	1	½	1	1	1	1	1	1	1	0	½	12
4	(Soviet Union) Aivars Gipslis	½	0	½	-	½	1	½	1	0	½	1	½	½	1	½	1	½	1	0	1	11½
5	(Soviet Union) Yuri Averbakh	0	½	½	½	-	½	½	1	½	½	0	½	1	0	1	1	1	1	1	½	11½
6	(Soviet Union) Georgy Borisenko	½	½	1	0	½	-	½	0	1	1	1	1	½	½	0	½	½	½	½	1	11
7	(Soviet Union) Ratmir Kholmov	½	½	½	½	½	½	-	½	½	0	½	½	½	½	½	1	½	1	0	1	10
8	(Soviet Union) Boris Vladimirov	½	0	1	0	0	1	½	-	1	½	½	0	½	1	½	0	½	½	1	1	10
9	(Soviet Union) Vladimir Simagin	0	0	0	1	½	0	½	0	-	½	1	1	½	½	1	1	1	0	1	½	10
10	(Soviet Union) Georgy Ilivitsky	½	½	0	½	½	0	1	½	½	-	½	½	½	0	0	1	½	½	1	1	9½
11	(Soviet Union) Jacob Yukhtman	0	½	½	0	1	0	½	½	0	½	-	0	½	½	1	½	1	1	1	½	9½
12	(Soviet Union) Anatoly Lutikov	0	0	0	½	½	0	½	1	0	½	1	-	0	1	1	1	½	½	1	½	9½
13	(Soviet Union) Vladimir Bagirov	½	½	0	½	0	½	½	½	½	½	½	1	-	½	½	0	½	0	1	1	9
14	(Soviet Union) Yury Kots	½	½	0	0	1	½	½	0	½	1	½	0	½	-	½	½	0	1	½	1	9
15	(Soviet Union) Lev Aronson	½	½	0	½	0	1	½	½	0	1	0	0	½	½	-	0	½	1	1	½	8½
16	(Soviet Union) Oleg Kaminsky	0	½	0	0	0	½	0	1	0	0	½	0	1	½	1	-	½	1	1	½	8
17	(Soviet Union) Vitaly Tarasov	½	0	0	½	0	½	½	½	0	½	0	½	½	1	½	½	-	0	½	½	7
18	(Soviet Union) Taras Prokhorovich	0	½	0	0	0	½	0	½	1	½	0	½	1	0	0	0	1	-	0	1	6½
19	(Soviet Union) Kurban Khanov	0	½	1	1	0	½	1	0	0	0	0	0	0	½	0	0	½	1	-	0	6
20	(Soviet Union) Marat Muhutdinov	½	½	½	0	½	0	0	0	½	0	½	½	0	0	½	½	½	0	1	-	6

=== Final ===
The semifinals qualifiers joined Tal and Bronstein (who entered the final directly by ranking criteria of the Soviet Federation) to play the final in Riga.

Riga Final, 25th Soviet Chess Championship
	Player	1	2	3	4	5	6	7	8	9	10	11	12	13	14	15	16	17	18	19	Total
1	(Soviet Union) Mikhail Tal	-	½	½	1	1	½	1	1	0	0	½	1	1	½	1	0	1	1	1	12½
2	(Soviet Union) Tigran Petrosian	½	-	½	½	½	½	½	½	½	½	½	½	½	1	1	1	1	1	1	12
3	(Soviet Union) David Bronstein	½	½	-	½	0	1	½	½	½	1	1	½	½	1	0	1	½	1	1	11½
4	(Soviet Union) Yuri Averbakh	0	½	½	-	½	1	½	1	½	½	½	0	1	1	½	1	½	½	1	11
5	(Soviet Union) Boris Spassky	0	½	1	½	-	1	0	0	½	½	1	½	0	1	½	½	1	1	1	10½
6	(Soviet Union) Lev Polugaevsky	½	½	0	0	0	-	1	½	½	½	½	½	1	1	½	½	1	1	1	10½
7	(Soviet Union) Efim Geller	0	½	½	½	1	0	-	½	0	½	1	½	½	½	½	1	½	1	1	10
8	(Soviet Union) Bukhuti Gurgenidze	0	½	½	0	1	½	½	-	0	½	½	1	½	0	1	1	½	1	1	10
9	(Soviet Union) Viktor Korchnoi	1	½	½	½	½	½	1	1	-	0	1	0	½	½	½	0	½	0	1	9½
10	(Soviet Union) Isaac Boleslavsky	1	½	0	½	½	½	½	½	1	-	0	½	½	½	½	½	½	1	½	9½
11	(Soviet Union) Nikolai Krogius	½	½	0	½	0	½	0	½	0	1	-	1	1	½	½	½	1	1	½	9½
12	(Soviet Union) Mark Taimanov	0	½	½	1	½	½	½	0	1	½	0	-	1	0	1	1	0	0	1	9
13	(Soviet Union) Alexander Kotov	0	½	½	0	1	0	½	½	½	½	0	0	-	1	½	1	½	1	1	9
14	(Soviet Union) Alexey Suetin	½	0	0	0	0	0	½	1	½	½	½	1	0	-	1	½	1	1	0	8
15	(Soviet Union) Aivars Gipslis	0	0	1	½	½	½	½	0	½	½	½	0	½	0	-	1	0	1	½	7½
16	(Soviet Union) Anatoly Bannik	1	0	0	0	½	½	0	0	1	½	½	0	0	½	0	-	1	½	1	7
17	(Soviet Union) Semyon Furman	0	0	½	½	0	0	½	½	½	½	0	1	½	0	1	0	-	0	½	6
18	(Soviet Union) Alexander Tolush	0	0	0	½	0	0	0	0	1	0	0	1	0	0	0	½	1	-	0	4
19	(Soviet Union) Georgy Borisenko	0	0	0	0	0	0	0	0	0	½	½	0	0	1	½	0	½	1	-	4
