= Vladimir Bykov =

Russian oncologist

Vladimir Bykov is a Russian oncologist and Karolinska Institutet Professor. On April 28, 2000, he along with his colleagues have proven that UV-induced DNA photoproduct levels do increase as people get older. He proved that by studying skin type and gender on 30 individuals which had various skin types. As a result, he discovered that people who have skin type I and II have higher induction of cyclobutane and pyrimidine dimers than those that have III or IV type. During the study he also mentioned that by combining thymidylyl and deoxycytidine the induction levels do become higher.
