= Tamaz Giorgadze =

Georgian chess grandmaster

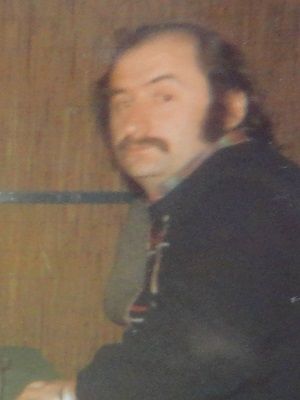

Personal information
- Born: 9 November 1947 (age 78) Georgian SSR

Chess career
- Country: Georgia
- Title: Grandmaster (1978)
- FIDE rating: 2499 (July 2026)
- Peak rating: 2535 (January 1978)
- Peak ranking: No. 50 (January 1978)

Tamaz Giorgadze (born 9 November 1947) is a Georgian chess player, he received the title of Grandmaster in 1978.
