= Yuri Balashov =

Russian chess grandmaster (born 1949)

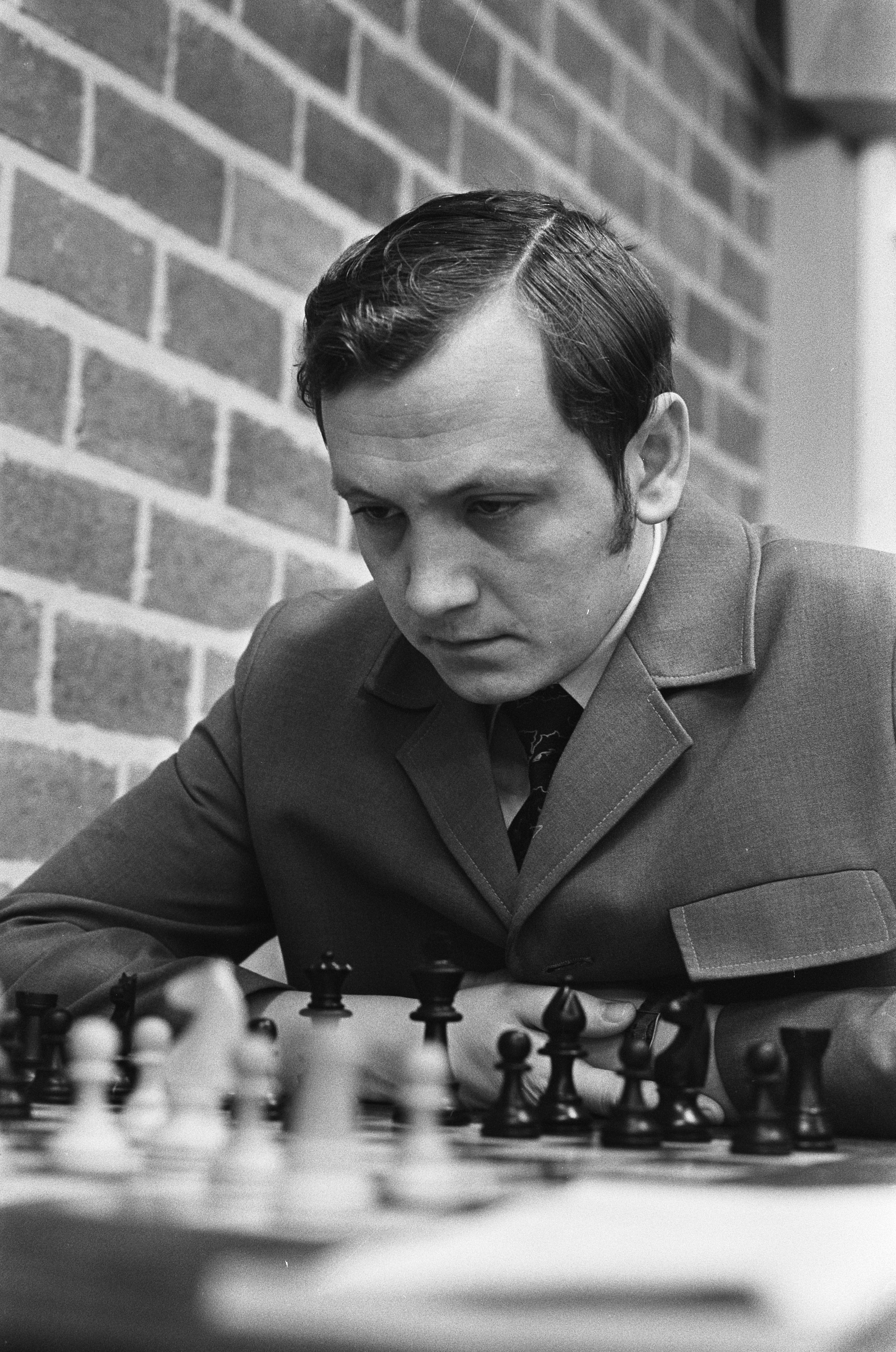
- Yuri Balashov in 1973

Personal information
- Born: Yuri Sergeyevich Balashov; 12 March 1949 (age 77) Shadrinsk, Kurgan Oblast, RSFSR, USSR

Chess career
- Country: USSR → Russia
- Title: Grandmaster (1973)
- Peak rating: 2600 (January 1979)
- Peak ranking: No. 11 (January 1979)

Yuri Sergeyevich Balashov (Russian: Ю́рий Серге́евич Балашо́в; born 12 March 1949) is a Russian chess player. He was awarded the title of Grandmaster by FIDE in 1973.

== Chess career ==
Born in Shadrinsk, Balashov was awarded the grandmaster title in 1973. Balashov was champion of Moscow in 1970 and runner-up to Anatoly Karpov in the 1976 USSR Championship. In 1977, he won Lithuanian Championship. He tied for first place at Lone Pine 1977 and at Wijk aan Zee 1982. In 2014, he won the Senior Tournament at the Moscow Open and tied with Anatoly Vaisser, Viktor Kupreichuk and Herman Claudius van Riemsdijk for first in the World Senior Championship in the 65+ section. Balashov took the silver medal on tiebreak. In the 2018 edition he tied with Vlastimil Jansa for first and again took silver on tiebreak.

Balashov represented the USSR in several team events. He played on the second board for the USSR team at the 1971, 1972, and 1974 World Student Team Championships, winning the second board individual gold in 1971, when he was an international master, with a score of 6½/8 points. Balashov played in four European Team Chess Championships, 1970, 1973, 1977, and 1980, winning the individual gold on the fifth board in 1977. At the 24th Chess Olympiad in 1980, he scored 7½/10 as the first board reserve to help the USSR team win the gold medal.

Balashov played for team "Russia 1" which won the European Senior Team Championship in 2014. He also played for the gold medal-winning Russian team at the World Senior Team Championships in the 65+ section in 2015, 2016, 2017, 2018, 2019.

== Chess strength ==
In the 1970s and early 1980s he was one of the top 25 chess players in the world. According to Chessmetrics, at his peak in July 1977 Balashov's play was equivalent to a rating of 2715, and he was ranked number 11 in the world. His best single performance was at Moscow (URS Championship), 1976, where he scored 10½/16 possible points (66%) against 2688-rated opposition, for a performance rating of 2773. Unfortunately for his chess-playing career, he had to spend a lot of time assisting Karpov at world championship matches and other events as a second and it has taken its toll on his career as a player.

== Trainer ==
In 1992, he was Boris Spassky's second in Yugoslavia during the "Revenge Match of the 20th century" against Bobby Fischer. In 2005 Balashov was awarded the title of FIDE Senior Trainer.

== Awards ==
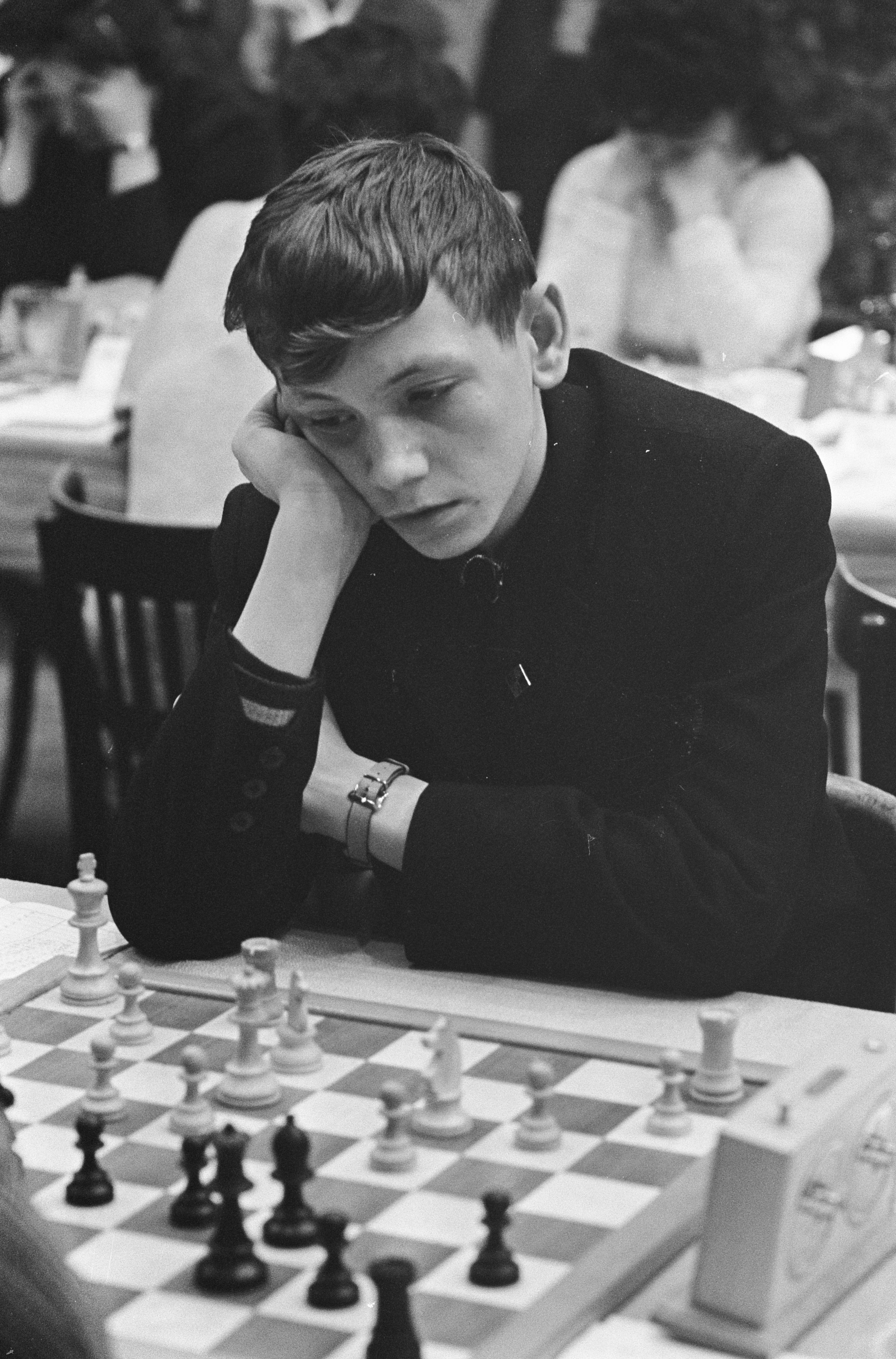
Yuri Balashov in 1965

- Order of Friendship of Peoples (1981)

== Notable games ==
- Yuri Balashov vs David Bronstein, Yerevan URS ch 1975, Spanish Game: Breyer Defense (C95), 1-0
- Evgeni Ellinovich Sveshnikov vs Yuri Balashov, Moscow URS ch 1976, French Defense: Euwe Variation (C02), 0-1
- Yuri Balashov vs Vasily Smyslov, Tilburg 1977, Spanish Game: Open Variations, Howell Attack (C81), 1-0
- Oleg Romanishin vs Yuri Balashov, Minsk URS ch 1979, Sicilian Defense: Paulsen Variation (B48), 0-1
- Khosro Sheik Harandi vs Yuri Balashov, Rio de Janeiro izt 1979, Sicilian Defense: Richter-Rauzer (B64), 0-1
- Anatoli Karpov vs Yuri Balashov, USSR 1980, Queen's Indian Defense: Kasparov Variation (E12), 0-1

== Bibliography ==
- Prandstetter, Eduard; Balashov, Yuri (1992). Basic Endgames. Prague Chess Agency. ISBN 80-901056-0-2.
