= Mikhail Tal =

Soviet and Latvian chess grandmaster (1936–1992)

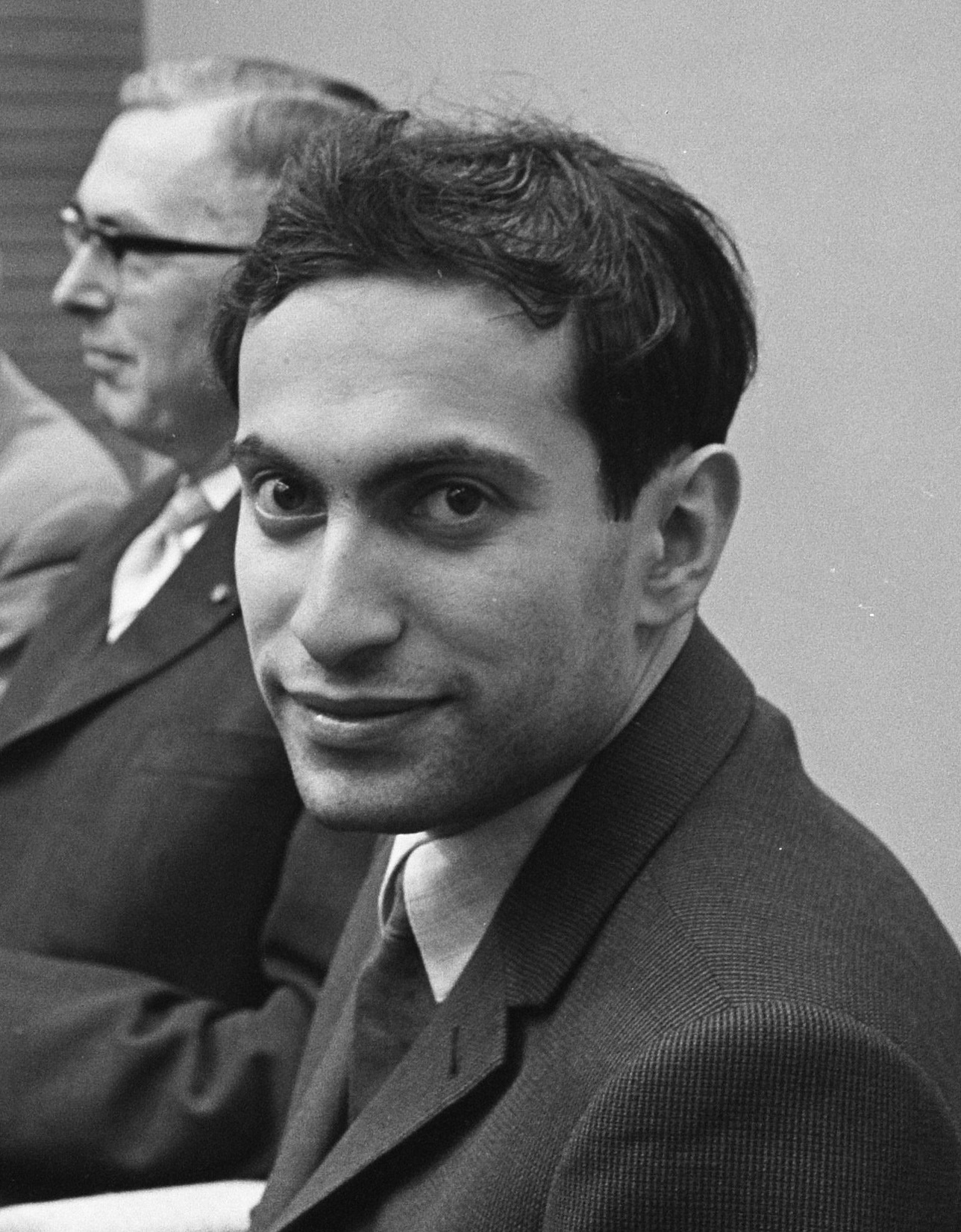
- Tal in 1962

Personal information
- Born: Mikhail Nekhemyevich Tal; 9 November 1936 Riga, Latvia
- Died: 28 June 1992 (aged 55) (Note: Tal's gravestone has 27 June as the date of his death. However, reliable sources state that he died on 28 June.) Moscow, Russia

Chess career
- Country: Soviet Union (until 1991); Latvia (from 1991)
- Title: Grandmaster (1957)
- World Champion: 1960–1961
- Peak rating: 2705 (January 1980)
- Peak ranking: No. 2 (January 1980)

Mikhail Tal (Note: Latvian: Mihails Tāls; Russian: Михаил Нехемьевич Таль, romanized: Mikhail Nekhemyevich Tal, IPA: [mʲɪxɐˈil nʲɪˈxʲemʲɪvʲɪtɕ ˈtalʲ].) (9 November 1936 – 28 June 1992) was a Soviet Latvian chess grandmaster and the eighth World Chess Champion. He is considered a creative genius and is widely regarded as one of the most influential players in chess history. Tal played in an attacking and combinatorial style. His play was known for improvisation and unpredictability. Vladislav Zubok said of him, "Every game for him was as inimitable and invaluable as a poem".

His nickname was "Misha", a diminutive for Mikhail, and he earned the nickname "The Magician from Riga". Both The Mammoth Book of the World's Greatest Chess Games and Modern Chess Brilliancies include more games by Tal than any other player. He also held the record for the longest unbeaten streak in competitive chess history with 95 games (46 wins, 49 draws) between 23 October 1973 and 16 October 1974, until Ding Liren's streak of 100 games (29 wins, 71 draws) between 9 August 2017 and 11 November 2018.

Tal died on 28 June 1992 in Moscow, Russia. The Mikhail Tal Memorial chess tournament was held in Moscow annually between 2006 and 2014, with two more tournaments in 2016 and 2018.

== Early years ==
Tal was born in Riga, Latvia, into a Jewish family. According to his friend Gennadi Sosonko, his true father was a family friend identified only as "Uncle Robert"; however, this was vehemently denied by Tal's third wife Angelina. Uncle Robert had been a taxi driver in Paris in the 1920s and had lost all his family in World War II. His mother, Ida Grigoryevna, was the eldest of four sisters; Tal frequently visited the Netherlands to see his aunt, Riva, and another of his aunts settled in the United States but visited Riga.

As a child, Tal joined the Riga Palace of Young Pioneers chess club. In 1949, he played Ratmir Kholmov, a young master who had recently competed in the Chigorin Memorial chess tournament in 1947, in a simultaneous exhibition. Tal used an imaginative combination to win his game at the age of 13.

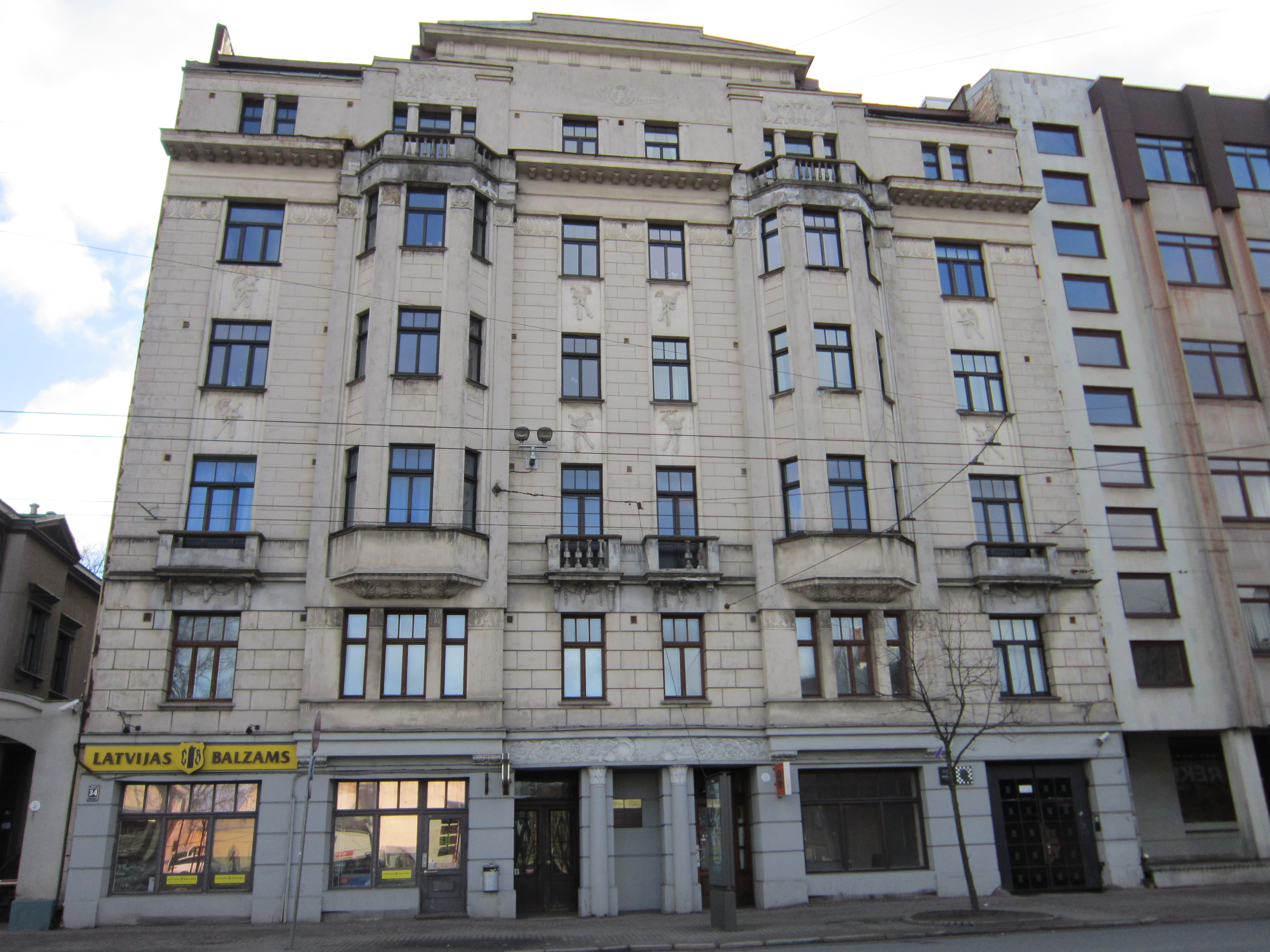
Tal lived in this apartment building in Riga.

== Soviet champion ==
Tal made his first significant appearance at the 1956 USSR Chess Championship, sharing 5th–7th place with Lev Polugaevsky and Ratmir Kholmov. Grigory Levenfish called him "the most colourful figure of the championship" and a "great talent" who strove for "sharp and complicated play". He was criticised by the media, however, for taking unnecessary risks and having restricted creative views. Tal then went to play on board three at the students' championship in Sweden, scoring 6 out of 7.

He became the youngest player to win the 1957 USSR Chess Championship, at the age of 20. He had not played in enough international tournaments to qualify for the title of Grandmaster, but FIDE decided at its 1957 Congress to waive the normal restrictions and award him the title because of his achievement in winning the Soviet Championship. At that time the Soviet Union was dominant in world chess, and Tal had beaten several of the world's top players to win the tournament.

Tal made three appearances for the USSR at Student Olympiads in 1956–1958, winning three team gold medals and three board gold medals. He won nineteen games, drew eight, and lost none, for 85.2 percent.

He retained the title of champion at the 1958 USSR Chess Championship, and competed in the World Chess Championship 1960 for the first time. He won the 1958 Interzonal tournament at Portorož, then helped the Soviet Union to win the 13th Chess Olympiad, being its fourth consecutive victory in Munich.

== World Champion ==
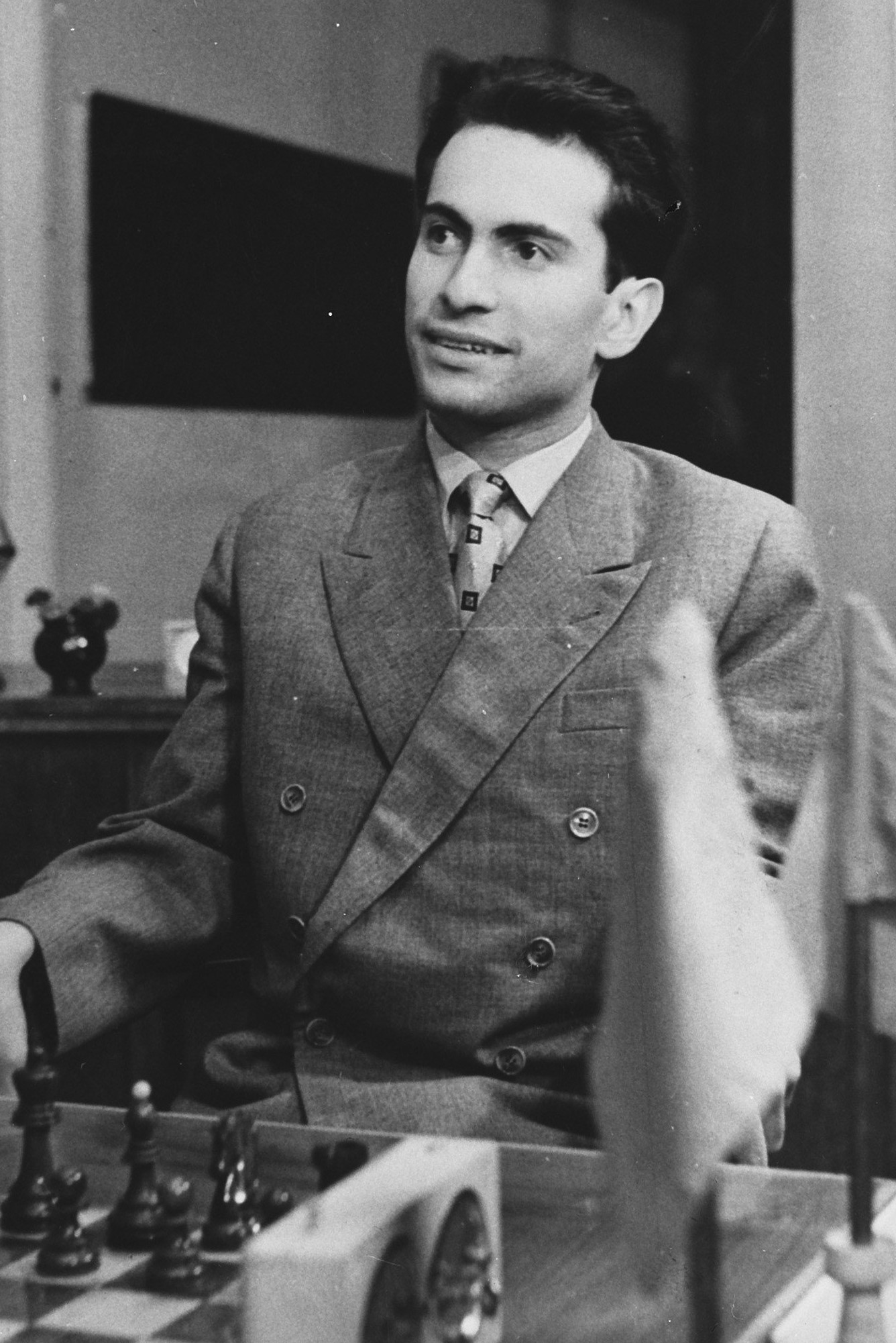
Tal in 1959

In 1959, Tal won a very strong tournament in Zurich, Switzerland. Following the Interzonal, the top players carried on to the Candidates' Tournament, Yugoslavia, 1959. Tal won with 20/28 points, ahead of Paul Keres with 18½, followed by Tigran Petrosian, Vasily Smyslov, Bobby Fischer, Svetozar Gligorić, Friðrik Ólafsson, and Pal Benko. Tal's victory was attributed to his dominance over the lower half of the field; whilst scoring only one win and three losses versus Keres, he won all four individual games against Fischer, and took 3½ points out of 4 from each of Gligorić, Olafsson, and Benko. When Benko arrived for his match with Tal, he wore dark glasses in order to avert the gaze of Tal, which could be intimidating. In response and as a joke, Tal wore large sunglasses which he borrowed from a member of the crowd.

In 1960, at the age of 23, Tal defeated the strategically minded Mikhail Botvinnik in a World Championship match, held in Moscow, by 12½–8½ (six wins, two losses, and thirteen draws), making him the youngest-ever World Champion (a record later broken by Garry Kasparov, who earned the title at 22, and broken again by Gukesh Dommaraju who earned the title at age 18). Botvinnik, who had never faced Tal before the title match began, won the return match against Tal in 1961, also held in Moscow, by 13–8 (ten wins to five, with six draws). In the period between the matches Botvinnik had thoroughly analysed Tal's style, and turned most of the return match's games into slow wars of maneuver or endgames, rather than the complicated tactical melees which were Tal's happy hunting ground. Tal's chronic kidney problems contributed to his defeat, and his doctors in Riga advised that he should postpone the match for health reasons. Yuri Averbakh claimed that Botvinnik would agree to a postponement only if Tal was certified unfit by Moscow doctors, and that Tal then decided to play. His short reign atop the chess world made him one of the two so-called "winter kings" who interrupted Botvinnik's long reign from 1948 to 1963 (the other was Smyslov, world champion 1957–58).

His highest Elo rating was 2705, achieved in 1980. According to Chessmetrics, a historical rating system that includes performances before the Elo system was adopted in 1970, Tal was world number one for 32 months, from October 1958 (after scoring 13½/15 at the 1958 Olympiad in Munich and 13½/20 at the 1958 Interzonal in Portoroz) through April 1961.

== Later achievements ==
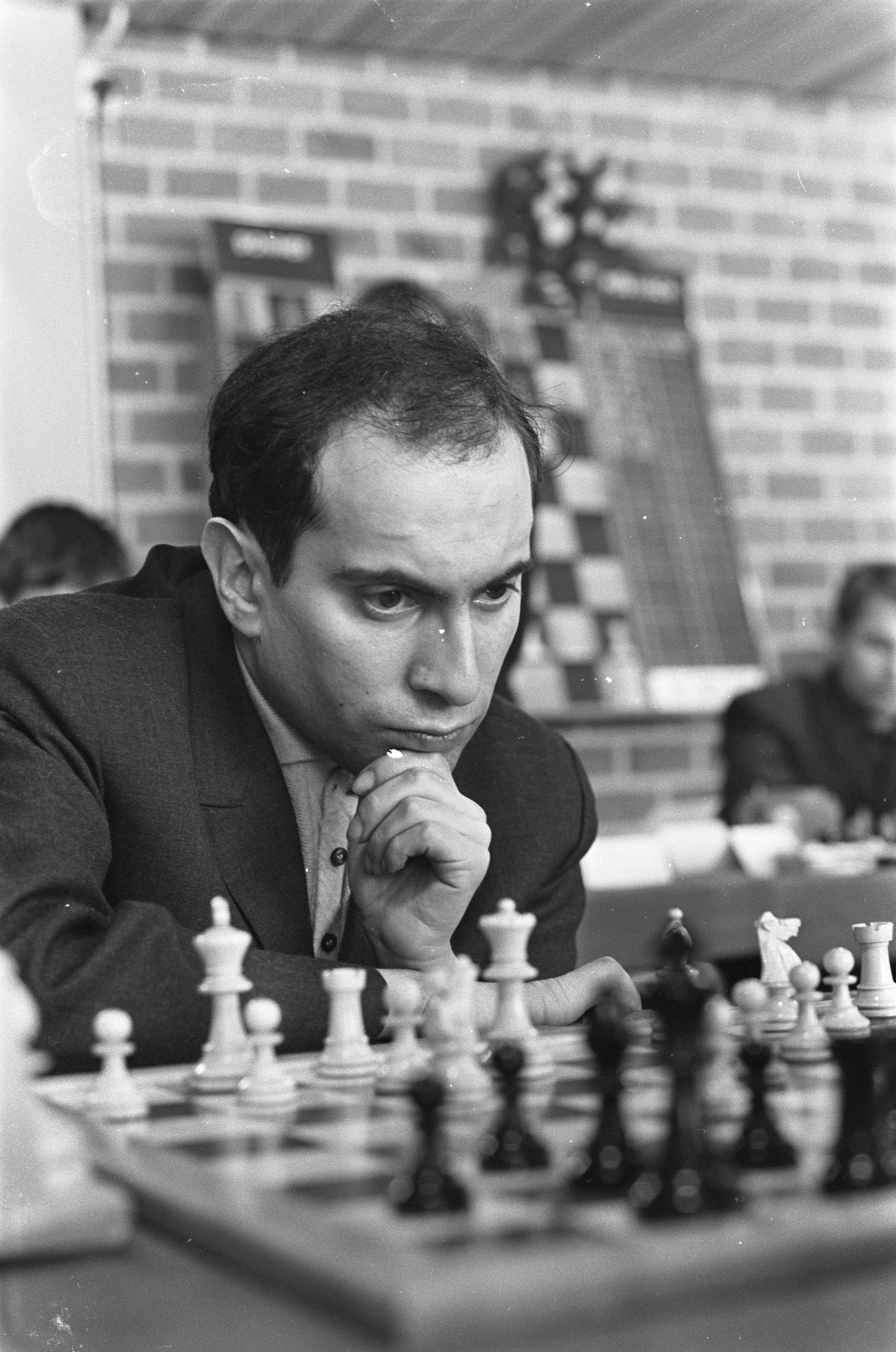
Tal in 1968

Soon after losing the rematch with Botvinnik, Tal won the 1961 Bled supertournament in SFR Yugoslavia, by one point over Fischer, despite losing their individual game, scoring 14½ from nineteen games (+11−1=7) with the world-class players Petrosian, Keres, Gligorić, Efim Geller, and Miguel Najdorf among the other participants.

Tal played in a total of six Candidates' Tournaments and match cycles, though he never again earned the right to play for the world title. In 1962 at Curaçao, then part of Netherlands Antilles, he had serious health problems, having undergone a major operation shortly before the tournament, and had to withdraw three-quarters of the way through, scoring just seven points (+3−10=8) from 21 games. He tied for first place at the 1964 Amsterdam Interzonal to advance to matches. Then in 1965, he lost the final match against Boris Spassky, after defeating Lajos Portisch and Bent Larsen in matches. Exempt from the 1967 Interzonal in Sousse, Tunisia, he defeated Gligorić 5½–3½ in Belgrade in 1968, but then lost the semi-final match against Viktor Korchnoi in Moscow.

Poor health caused a slump in his play from late 1968 to late 1969, but he recovered his form after having a kidney removed. He won the 1979 Riga Interzonal with an undefeated score of 14/17, but the next year lost a quarter-final match to Lev Polugaevsky, one of the players to hold a positive score against him. He also played in the 1985 Montpellier (France) Candidates' Tournament, a round-robin of 16 qualifiers, finishing in a tie for fourth and fifth places, and narrowly missing further advancement after drawing a playoff match with Jan Timman, who held the tiebreak advantage from the tournament proper.

From July 1972 to April 1973, Tal played a record 86 consecutive games without a loss (47 wins and 39 draws). Between 23 October 1973 and 16 October 1974, he played 95 consecutive games without a loss (46 wins and 49 draws), shattering his previous record. These were the two longest unbeaten streaks in competitive chess for more than four decades, until Ding Liren broke the record in 2018 with 100 games, although with far fewer wins than either of Tal's streaks (29 wins, 71 draws).

Tal remained a formidable opponent as he got older. He played Anatoly Karpov 22 times, 12 of them during the latter's reign as World Champion, with a record of +0−1=19 in classical games and +1−2=19 overall.

One of Tal's greatest achievements during his later career was an equal first place with Karpov (whom he seconded in a number of tournaments and world championships) in the 1979 Montreal (Canada) "Tournament of Stars", with an unbeaten score of (+6−0=12), the only undefeated player in the field, which also included Spassky, Portisch, Vlastimil Hort, Robert Hübner, Ljubomir Ljubojević, Lubomir Kavalek, Jan Timman, and Larsen.

Tal played in 21 Soviet Championships, (Note: This includes the 1983 final when Tal had to withdraw after five games.) winning it six times (1957, 1958, 1967, 1972, 1974, 1978). He was also a five-time winner of the International Chess Tournament in Tallinn, then part of the Estonian SSR, with victories in 1971, 1973, 1977, 1981, and 1983.

Tal also had successes in blitz chess; in 1970, he took second place to Fischer, who scored 19/22, in a blitz tournament at Herceg Novi, SFR Yugoslavia, ahead of Korchnoi, Petrosian, and Smyslov. In 1988, at the age of 51, he won the second official World Blitz Championship (the first was won by Kasparov the previous year in Brussels, Belgium) at Saint John, Canada, ahead of such players as Kasparov, the reigning world champion, and ex-champion Anatoly Karpov. In the final, he defeated Rafael Vaganian by 3½–½.

On 28 May 1992, at the Moscow blitz tournament (which he left the hospital to play), he defeated Kasparov. He died one month later.

== Team competitions ==
In Chess Olympiad play, Mikhail Tal was a member of eight Soviet teams, each of which won team gold medals (1958, 1960, 1962, 1966, 1972, 1974, 1980, and 1982), won 65 games, drew 34, and lost only two games (81.2%). This percentage makes him the player with the best score among those participating in at least four Olympiads. Individually, Tal won seven Olympiad board medals, including five gold (1958, 1962, 1966, 1972, 1974) and two silver (1960, 1982).

Tal also represented the Soviet Union at six European Team Chess Championships (1957, 1961, 1970, 1973, 1977, 1980), winning team gold medals each time, and three board gold medals (1957, 1970, and 1977). He scored 14 wins, 20 draws, and three losses, for 64.9%.

Tal played board nine for the USSR in the first match against the Rest of the World team at Belgrade, SFR Yugoslavia in 1970, scoring 2 out of 4. He was on board seven for the USSR in the second match against the Rest of the World team at London, United Kingdom in 1984, scoring 2 out of 3. The USSR won both team matches. He was an Honoured Master of Sport.

From 1950 (when he won the Latvian junior championship) to 1991, Tal won or tied for first in 68 tournaments (see table below). During his 41-year career he played about 2,700 tournament or match games, winning over 65% of them.

== Health problems and death ==
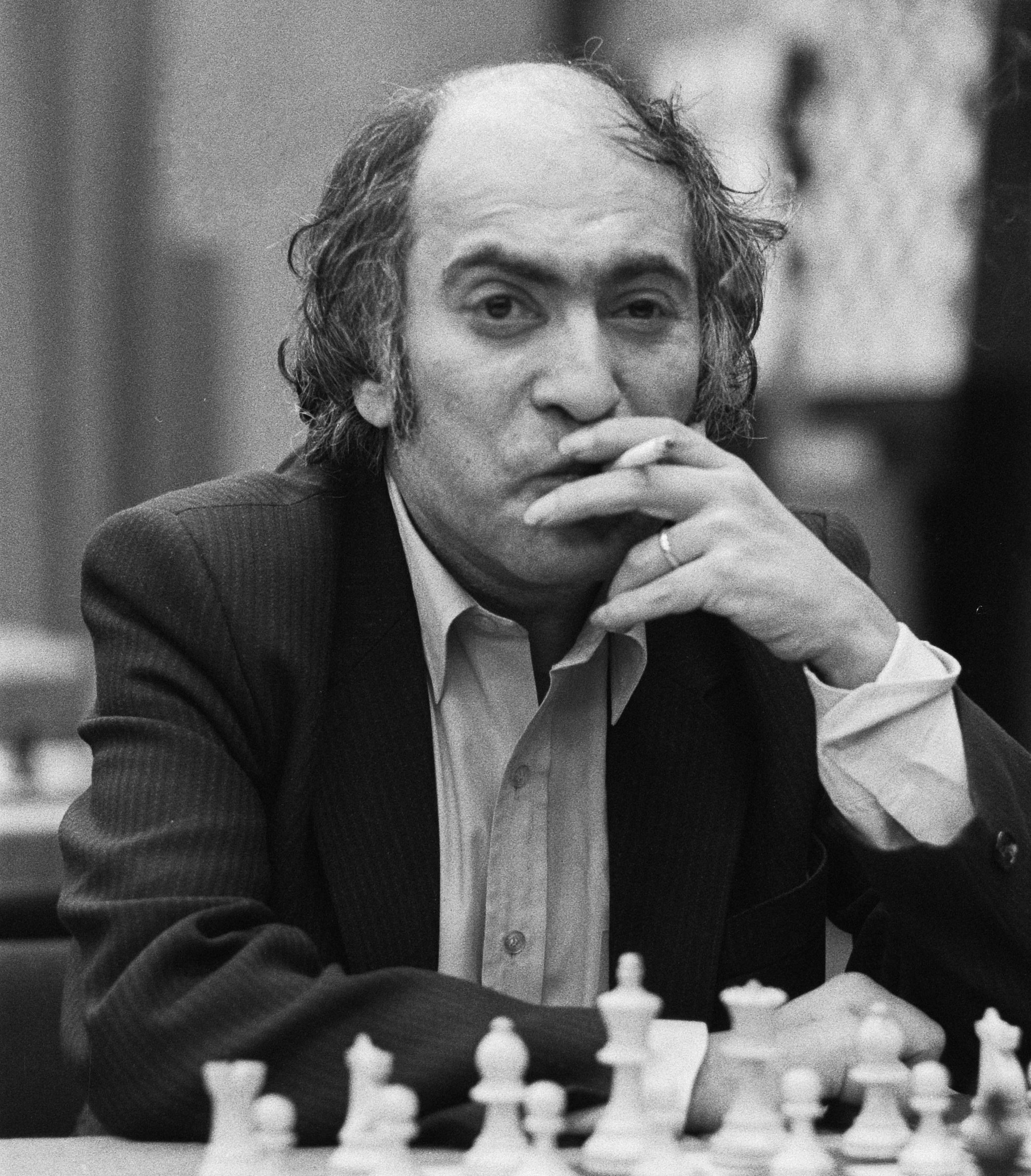
Tal in 1982

Tal was a heavy drinker and chain smoker. His already fragile health suffered as a result, and he spent a great deal of time in the hospital, including an operation to remove a kidney in 1969. He was also briefly addicted to morphine, prescribed due to intense pain.

On 28 June 1992, Tal died in a Moscow hospital, officially of a hemorrhage in the esophagus. His friend and fellow Soviet grandmaster Gennadi Sosonko reported that "effectively his entire organism had ceased to function."

Tal had the congenital deformity of ectrodactyly in his right hand (visible in some photographs). Despite this, he was a skilled piano player.

== Playing style ==
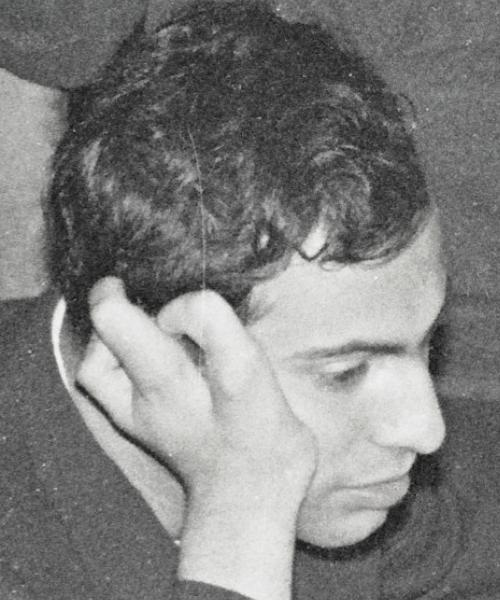
Tal in 1961

Tal was known as "The Magician from Riga", and his style of play was very aggressive and involved heavy calculation. He often sacrificed material in search of activity and initiative, which is defined as the ability to make threats to which the opponent must respond. Many masters found it difficult to refute Tal's ideas, looking at how many problems he created, though deeper post-game analysis found flaws in some of his calculations. Tal's style of play was so intimidating that James Eade listed Tal as one of the three players whom contemporaries were most afraid of playing against (the others being Capablanca and Fischer).

Although his playing style was at first scorned by ex-world champion Vasily Smyslov as nothing more than "tricks", Tal convincingly beat many notable grandmasters with his aggression. It is also notable that he adopted a more sedate and positional style in his later years.

In the modern day, Latvian Alexei Shirov has been most often compared to Tal. In fact, he studied with Tal as a youth. Many other Latvian grandmasters and masters, for instance Alexander Shabalov and Alvis Vītoliņš, have played in a similar vein, causing some to speak of a "Latvian School of Chess".

== Notable games ==
- Tal vs. Alexander Tolush, USSR Championship, Moscow 1957, King's Indian Defence, Sämisch Variation (ECO E81), 1–0
- Boris Spassky vs. Tal, USSR Championship, Riga 1958, Nimzo-Indian Defence, Sämisch Variation (E26), 0–1
- Tal vs. Vasily Smyslov, Yugoslavia Candidates' Tournament 1959, Caro–Kann Defence (B10), 1–0
- Robert James Fischer vs. Tal, Belgrade, Candidates' Tournament 1959, Sicilian Defence, Fischer–Sozin Attack (B87), 0–1
- Mikhail Botvinnik vs. Tal, World Championship Match, Moscow 1960, 6th game, King's Indian Defence, Fianchetto Variation
- István Bilek vs. Tal, Moscow 1967, King's Indian Attack, Spassky Variation (A05), 0–1
- Boris Spassky vs. Tal, Tallinn tt 1973, Nimzo-Indian Defence, Leningrad Variation (E30), 0–1
- Tal vs. Tigran Petrosian, 8th Soviet Team Cup, Moscow 1974, rd 5, Pirc Defence, Classical System, (B08), 1–0
- Tal vs. Joel Lautier, Barcelona 1992

== Various scores with major grandmasters ==
Only official tournament or match games have been taken into account. '+' corresponds to Tal's wins, '−' to his losses and '=' to draws. Winning records in bold.

- (Soviet Union) **Mikhail Botvinnik: +12−12=20**
- (Soviet Union) **David Bronstein: +12−8=19**
- (United States) **Bobby Fischer: +4−2=5**
- (Soviet Union) **Efim Geller: +6−6=23**
- (Soviet Union) Anatoly Karpov: +0−1=19
- (Soviet Union) Garry Kasparov: +1−2=9
- (Soviet Union) Paul Keres: +4−8=20
- (Soviet Union) Viktor Korchnoi: +4−13=27
- (Denmark) **Bent Larsen: +12−7=18**
- (Soviet Union) Tigran Petrosian: +4−5=35
- (Soviet Union) Lev Polugaevsky: +2−8=22
- (Hungary) **Lajos Portisch: +9−5=18**
- (Soviet Union) Vasily Smyslov: +3−4=21
- (Soviet Union) Boris Spassky: +6−9=27
- (Soviet Union) Leonid Stein: +0−3=15
- (Argentina) **Miguel Najdorf: +3−1=5**
- (United States) **Pal Benko: +8−1=3**
- (East Germany) **Wolfgang Uhlmann: +4−0=3**
- (Socialist Federal Republic of Yugoslavia) **Borislav Ivkov: +3−1=11**
- (Socialist Federal Republic of Yugoslavia) **Svetozar Gligoric: +10−2=22**

== Tournament and match wins (or equal first) ==
=== 1950–1965 ===
Year	Tournament / Championship	Match / Team competition
1950	Riga – Latvia Junior championship, 1st	
1953	Riga – 10th Latvian championship, 1st (14½/19)	Leningrad, Soviet Team Championship final, board 2, 1st–2nd (4½/7)
1954		Match with Vladimir Saigin for the title of Soviet Master (+4−2=8)
1955	Riga – 23rd Soviet Championship Semifinal, 1st (12½/18)	
1956		Uppsala – World students team championship, board 3 (6/7)
1957	Moscow – 24th URS-ch, 1st (14/21)	Reykjavík – Wch-team students, board 1 (8½/10); Baden, Austria – European Team Championship, board 4, 1st–2nd (3/5)
1958	Riga – 25th URS-ch, 1st (12/19); Portorož Interzonal, 1st (13½/20)	Varna – Wch-team students, board 1 (8½/10); Munich 1958 Olympiad, board 5 (13½/15)
1959	Riga – Latvian Olympiad, 1st (7/7); Zürich tournament, 1st (11½/15); Bled–Zagreb–Belgrade – Candidates tournament, 1st (20/28)	
1960		Moscow – Match for the World title with Mikhail Botvinnik (+6−2=13); Hamburg – Match West Germany vs. USSR, 1st (7½/8); Leipzig 1960 Olympiad, board 1, silver medal (11/15)
1960/61	Stockholm tournament, 1st (9½/11)	
1961	Bled tournament, 1st (14½/19)	
1962		Varna 1962 Olympiad, board 6 (10/13)
1963	Miskolc tournament, 1st (12½/15)	Moscow, USSR Spartakiad, board 1, 1st (6/9)
1963/64	Hastings Premier tournament, 1st (7/9)	
1964	Reykjavík tournament, 1st (12½/13); Amsterdam Interzonal, 1st–4th (17/23); Kislovodsk tournament, 1st (7½/10)	Moscow, USSR Club Team Championship, board 1, 1st (4½/6)
1965	Riga, Latvian championship, 1st (10/13)	Bled – Quarter-final Candidates Match with Lajos Portisch: (+4−1=3); Bled – Semi-final Candidates Match with Bent Larsen (+3−2=5)

=== 1966–1977 ===
Year	Tournament / Championship	Match / Team competition
1966	Sarajevo tournament, 1st–2nd (11/15); Palma de Mallorca tournament, 1st (12/15)	Havana 1966 Olympiad, board 3 (12/13)
1967	Kharkiv – 35th URS-ch, =1st (12/15)	Moscow, USSR Spartakiad, final B, 1st (6/9)
1968	Gori tournament, 1st (7½/10)	Belgrade – Quarter-final Candidates Match with Svetozar Gligorić (+3−1=5)
1969/70	Tbilisi – Goglidze memorial tournament, 1st–2nd (10½/15)	
1970	Poti – Georgian Open championship, 1st (11/14); Sochi – Grandmasters vs. Young Masters, 1st (10½/14)	Belgrade – World vs. USSR, board 9 Match with Miguel Najdorf (+1−1=2); Kapfenberg, European Team Championship, board 6 (5/6)
1971	Tallinn tournament, 1st–2nd (11½/15)	Rostov-on-Don, USSR Club Team Championship, board 1, 1st (4½/6)
1972	Sukhumi tournament, 1st (11/15); Baku – 40th URS-ch, 1st (15/21)	Skopje 1972 Olympiad, board 4 (14/16)
1973	Wijk aan Zee tournament, 1st (10½/15); Tallinn tournament, 1st (12/15); Sochi – Mikhail Chigorin memorial, 1st (11/15); Dubna tournament, 1st–2nd (10/15)	Bath, European Team Championship, board 6, silver medal (4/6)
1973/74	Hastings tournament, 1st–4th (10/15)	
1974	Lublin tournament, 1st (12½/15); Halle tournament, 1st (11½/15); Novi Sad tournament, 1st (11½/15); Leningrad – 42nd URS-ch, =1st (9½/15)	Nice 1974 Olympiad, board 5 (11½/15); Moscow, USSR Club Team Championship, board 1, 1st (6½/9)
1976		Stockholm, Match with Ulf Andersson (+1=7)
1977	Tallinn – Keres memorial, 1st (11½/17); Leningrad 60th October Rev., 1st–2nd (11½/17); Sochi – Chigorin memorial, 1st (11/15)	Moscow, European Team Championship, board 4 (4½/6)

=== 1978–1991 ===
Year	Tournament / Championship
1978	Tbilisi – 46th URS-ch, 1st (11/17)
1979	Montreal tournament, 1st–2nd (12/18); Riga Interzonal, 1st (14/17)
1981	Tallinn – Keres memorial, 1st (12½/15); Málaga tournament, 1st (7/11); Moscow, Soviet Team Championship, board 1, 1st (7/9); Riga tournament, 1st (11/15); Lviv tournament, 1st–2nd (9/13)
1981/82	Porz tournament, 1st (9/11)
1982	Moscow tournament, 1st (9/13); Erevan tournament, 1st (10/15); Sochi – Chigorin memorial, 1st (10/15); Pforzheim tournament, 1st (9/11)
1983	Tallinn – Keres memorial, 1st (10/15)
1984	Albena tournament, 1st–2nd (7/11)
1985	Jūrmala tournament, 1st (9/13)
1986	West Berlin open, 1st–2nd (7½/9); Tbilisi – Goglidze memorial, 1st–2nd (9/13)
1987	Termas de Río Hondo (Argentina), 1st (8/11); Jūrmala tournament, 1st–4th (7½/13)
1988	Chicago – National Open, 1st–6th (5½/6); Saint John – World blitz Championship: 1st
1991	Buenos Aires – Najdorf memorial, 1st–3rd (8½/13)

== Book titles ==
- Tal, Mikhail (2001) [1970]. Tal–Botvinnik, 1960. Russell Enterprises. ISBN 1-888690-08-9.
- Tal, Mikhail (1973). World Championship: Petrosian vs. Spassky 1966. Chess Digest.
- Tal, Mikhail (2003) [1975]. "Mikhail Tal, The Score Isn't Everything, Victory in the Ending". In Keene, Raymond (ed.). Learn from the Grandmasters. Batsford. pp. 5–16. ISBN 0713481382.
- Tal, Mikhail (1997) [1978]. The Life and Games of Mikhail Tal. Everyman Chess. ISBN 1-85744-202-4.
- Tal, Mikhail & Alexander Koblencs (2013) [1978]. Study Chess with Tal. Batsford. ISBN 978-1849941099.
- Tal, Mikhail & Viktor Khenkin (1979). Tal's Winning Chess Combinations: The Secrets of Winning Chess Combinations Described and Explained by the Russian Grandmaster Mikhail Tal. Simon and Schuster. ISBN 0671242628.
- Tal, Mikhail; Roshal, Aleksandr; Chepizhny, V. (1980). Montreal 1979: Tournament of Stars. Pergamon Press. ISBN 0080241328.
- Tal, Mikhail & E.B. Edmondson (1981). Chess Scandals: The 1978 World Chess Championship. Pergamon Press. ISBN 008024145X.
- Tal, Mikhail (1988). "The chess calculator's confession". In Estrin, Yakov; Romanov, Isaac (eds.). The World Champions Teach Chess. A & C Black. pp. 102–112. ISBN 0713655968.
- Tal, Mikhail; Damsky, Iakov; Neat, Ken (tr.) (1994). Attack with Mikhail Tal. Everyman Chess. ISBN 1-85744-043-9.

== See also ==
- List of Jewish chess players

== Notes ==
Awards
Preceded by Mikhail Botvinnik	World Chess Champion; 1960–61	Succeeded by Mikhail Botvinnik
Preceded by —	World Blitz Chess Champion; 1988	Succeeded by Viswanathan Anand
