= Gennadij Timoscenko =

Slovak chess grandmaster (born 1949)

Personal information
- Born: 27 April 1949 (age 77) Chelyabinsk, Russia

Chess career
- Country: Soviet Union; Russia; Slovakia
- Title: Grandmaster (1980)
- FIDE rating: 2457 (July 2026)
- Peak rating: 2540 (July 1997)

Gennadij Timoscenko (Russian: Геннадий Анатольевич Тимощенко; Slovak: Gennadij Timoščenko; born 27 April 1949), is a Russian and Slovak chess Grandmaster (GM) (1980).

== Biography ==
At the turn of the 1970s and 1980s, Gennadij Timoscenko was one of the leading Soviet chess players. He appeared twice in the finals of the USSR Chess Championship.

- in 1978, in Tbilisi he shared 10th-12th place with Boris Gulko and Vladimir Bagirov;
- in 1981, in Frunze he ranked in 17th place.

Gennadij Timoscenko also won two silver medals in the Russian Chess Championships in 1972 and 1976. In 1979, in Tashkent he won the Soviet Army Chess Championship.

From 1982 to 1986 Gennadij Timoscenko was one of Garry Kasparov's coaches. In 1993 he settled in Slovakia, and from the following year Gennadij Timoscenko represented this country in the international chess tournaments.

Gennadij Timoscenko has achieved many successes in international chess tournaments, winning or sharing first place among others in Rimavská Sobota (1974), Polanica-Zdrój (1976, Rubinstein Memorial), Varna (1977), Słupsk (1979), Helsinki (1986, together with Jón Loftur Árnason), London (1992, together with Jon Speelman), Šaľa (1994), Starý Smokovec (1996), Bolzano (1998), Seefeld (1998, 1999), Padua (1998, 2000 from Erald Dervishi), Cutro (2000), Graz (2003) and in Opatija (2003). In 2010 and 2011 he won bronze medals twice in a row in the European Senior Chess Championship in the S60 age group (players over 60 years old). In 2011, in Opatija he also won the bronze medal in the World Senior Chess Championship in the same age category.

Gennadij Timoscenko played for Slovakia in the Chess Olympiads:

- In 1996, at second board in the 32nd Chess Olympiad in Yerevan (+3, =5, -4),
- In 2000, at third board in the 34th Chess Olympiad in Istanbul (+5, =6, -1),
- In 2002, at third reserve board in the 35th Chess Olympiad in Bled (+4, =6, -1),
- In 2004, at reserve board in the 36th Chess Olympiad in Calvià (+3, =6, -1),
- In 2006, at third board in the 37th Chess Olympiad in Turin (+3, =4, -2).

Gennadij Timoscenko played for Slovakia in the European Team Chess Championship:

- In 1997, at third board in the 11th European Team Chess Championship in Pula (+3, =6, -0) and won individual bronze medal,
- In 2001, at third board in the 13th European Team Chess Championship in León (+2, =2, -3).

In 1976, he was awarded the FIDE International Master (IM) title and received the FIDE Grandmaster (GM) title in 1980.
