= Vitaly Tseshkovsky =

Russian chess grandmaster (1944–2011)

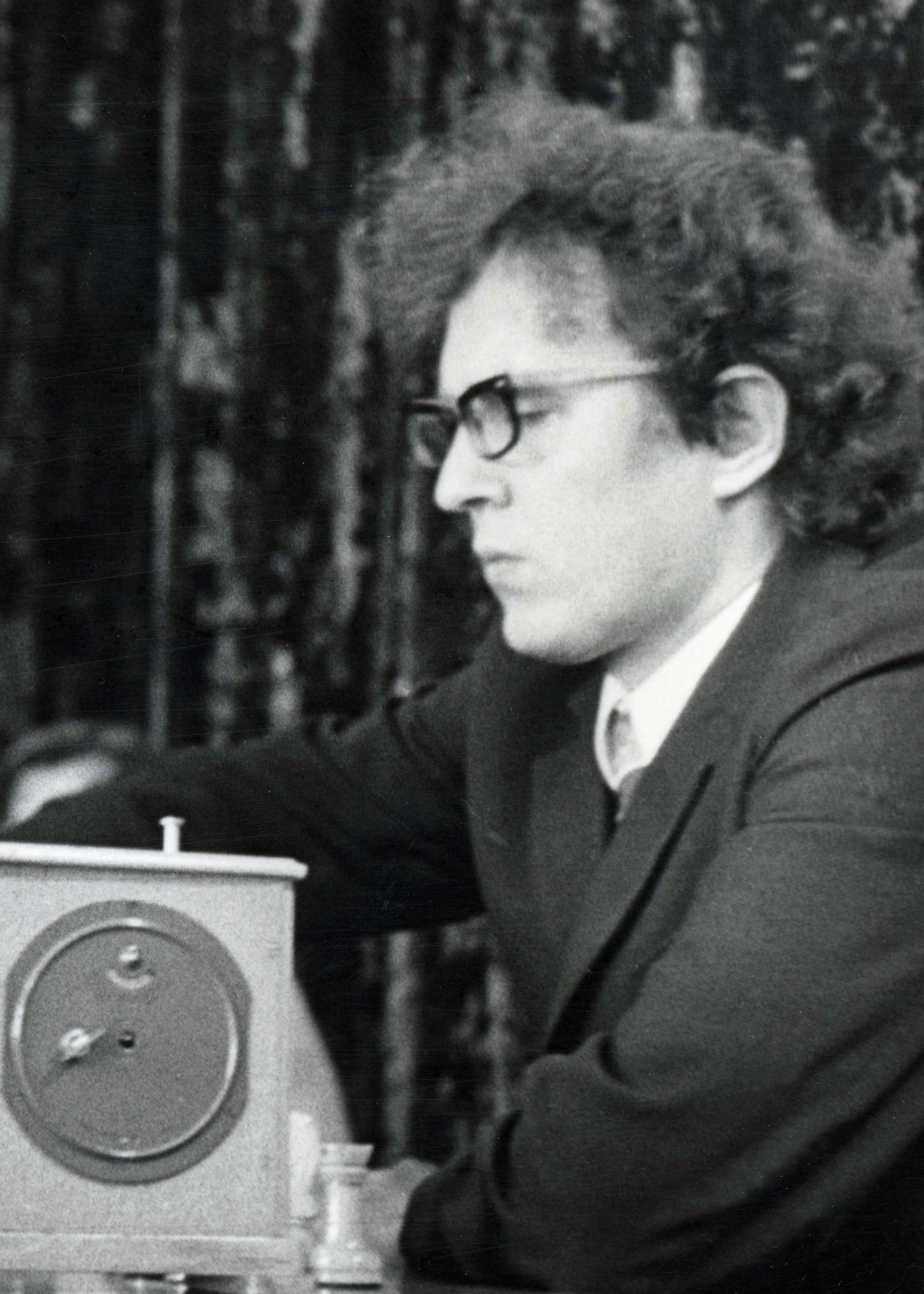
- Vitaly Tseshkovsky, 1973

Personal information
- Full name: Vitaly Valeryevich Tseshkovsky
- Born: September 25, 1944 Omsk, USSR
- Died: December 24, 2011 (aged 67) Krasnodar, Russia

Chess career
- Country: Soviet Union; Russia
- Title: Grandmaster (1975)
- Peak rating: 2600 (October 2005)
- Peak ranking: No. 15 (January 1980)

Vitaly Valeryevich Tseshkovsky (Russian: Виталий Валерьевич Цешковский; 25 September 1944 – 24 December 2011) was a Russian chess Grandmaster and a former champion of the USSR.

== Biography ==
Tseshkovsky was born in Omsk.

He was awarded the International Master title in 1973 and became an International Grandmaster in 1975.

His best tournament victories include first at Leipzig 1975, Dubna 1976, Yerevan 1980, Banja Luka 1981, Sochi 1981 and Minsk 1982. He was co-winner of the 1978 Soviet Championship (with Mikhail Tal) and winner of the 1986 Championship. He beat some world champions: Vasily Smyslov at the Moscow Spartakiad 1974, Tal at Sochi 1970, and a young Garry Kasparov at the 1978 Soviet Championship. Tseshkovsky himself almost qualified for the World Championship candidates matches when he finished fourth in the 1976 Manila Interzonal, one place lower than was needed to progress to the next stage. At the 27th Chess Olympiad in 1986, he scored 2½/5 as the second reserve board to help the USSR team win the gold medal.

His 6/9 result in Saint Petersburg, 2004 qualified Tseshkovsky to play in the Russian Championship final later in the year, alongside Russia's seven top players (including Garry Kasparov who won) and five other qualifiers. In 2008 he tied for first with Farrukh Amonatov and Anton Filippov in the Georgy Agzamov Memorial tournament in Tashkent. In the following year he took clear first place in the same tournament. Tseshkovsky won the European Senior Chess Championship in 2009 and 2010. In 2010, he also tied for 2nd-4th with Algimantas Butnorius and Nikolai Pushkov in the European Seniors’ Rapid Championship, which was won by Viktor Kupreichik.

In the opening, his choice was 1.e4 with the white pieces. With Black he played the Ruy Lopez, Sicilian Defence, Pirc Defence and Modern Defence against 1.e4, and against 1.d4 he most often played the Grünfeld Defence and Benko Gambit.

Tseshkovsky maintained a high standard of chess throughout his career, registering his highest Elo rating of 2600 in October 2005. As a coach, he assisted with the training of many high-profile players including Vladimir Kramnik, Bartlomiej Macieja and Boris Savchenko.

He died on 24 December 2011 in Krasnodar. The cause of death was a heart attack that happened while he was at the chessboard participating in a tournament.
