= Oleg Romanishin =

Ukrainian chess grandmaster (born 1952)

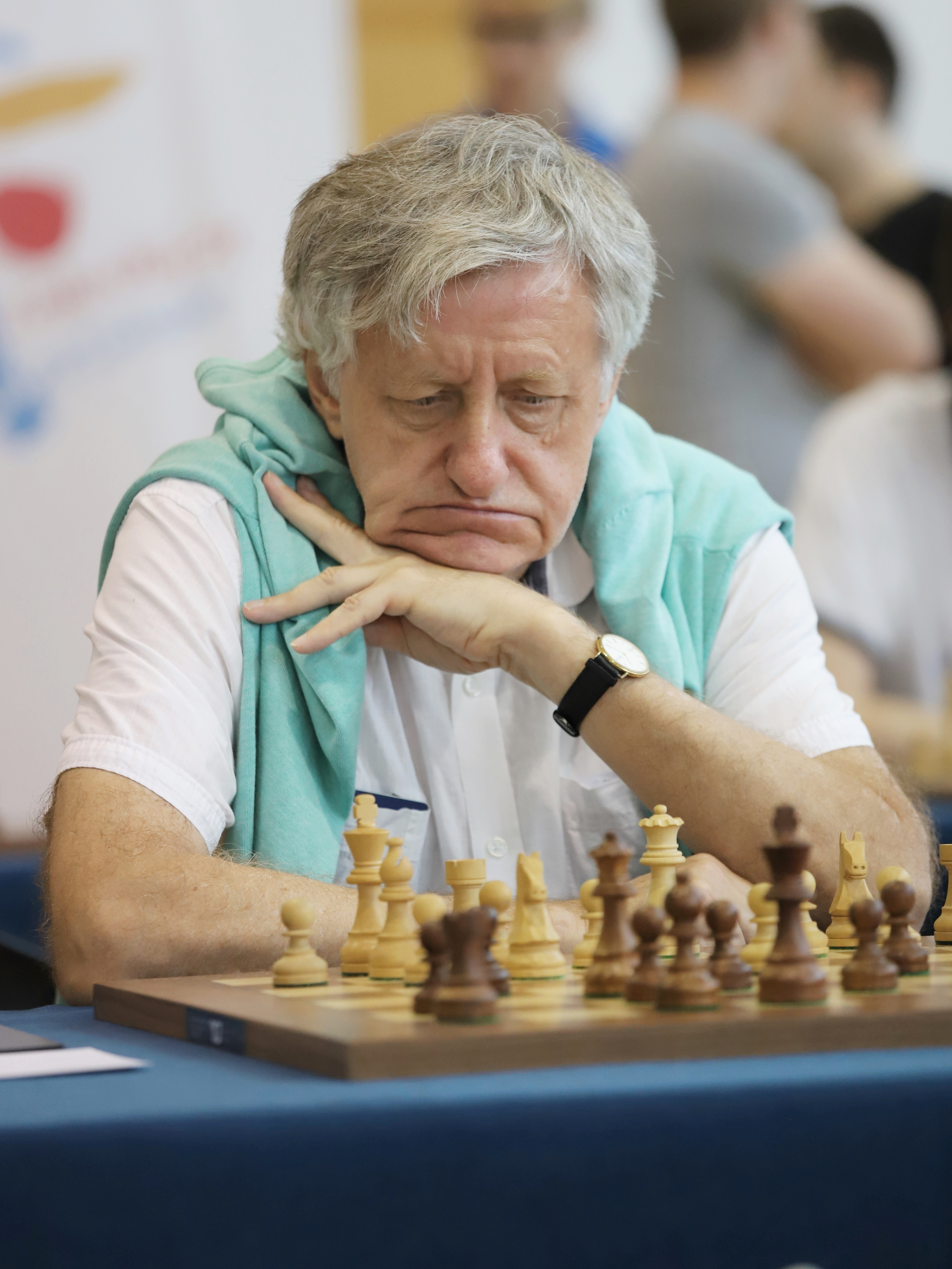
- Romanishin in 2019

Personal information
- Born: Oleh Mykhailovych Romanyshyn; 10 January 1952 (age 74) Lviv, Ukrainian SSR, Soviet Union

Chess career
- Country: Soviet Union (until 1991); Ukraine (since 1992)
- Title: Grandmaster (1976)
- Peak rating: 2615 (July 1993)
- Peak ranking: No. 11 (January 1978)

Oleg Mikhailovich Romanishin (Ukrainian: Олег Михайлович Романишин, romanized: Oleh Mykhailovych Romanyshyn; born 10 January 1952) is a Ukrainian chess grandmaster and former European junior champion.

== Career ==
Many honours and awards were bestowed on Romanishin as a young man. After winning the European Junior Championship in 1973, he became an International Master the same year. In 1974, Romanishin was a member of the victorious USSR team at the World Student Team Championship held in Teesside, England, where he scored the best result for board 4 (8/9).

The following year, he had a terrific result at the USSR Championship, sharing second place with Boris Gulko, Mikhail Tal and Rafael Vaganian, after Tigran Petrosian. In 1976, his Grandmaster title was ratified.

Romanishin has an impressive collection of tournament victories, including Odesa 1974, Novi Sad 1975, Yerevan 1976, Hastings 1976/77, Tallinn 1977, Leningrad 1977 (shared with Tal), Gausdal 1979, Polanica Zdroj 1980, Lviv 1981 (shared with Tal), Jurmala 1983, Moscow 1985, Reggio Emilia 1986 (shared with Andersson and Ljubojević) and Debrecen 1990. Playing the Hungarian Open Championship at Györ in 1990 he finished two points ahead of the field. Second place finishes at Tilburg 1979 (after Karpov) and Dortmund 1982 (after Hort) were also important landmarks in his career, as was his third equal finish at Sochi in 1982.

Nowadays less active as a tournament player, Romanishin has nevertheless won smaller events on the grandmaster circuit, such as Solin-Split 2004 and Hotel Petra (Rome) 2005.

At the Olympiads he represented the Soviet Union in 1978 and thereafter played for Ukraine through the 1990s, winning a total of 2 silver medals and 2 bronze. At the European Team Chess Championships his medal haul has amounted to an incredible 6 gold and 1 silver.

His chess playing style has been described as aggressive and this may be a result of the coaching he received as a junior. Along with a group of other aspiring masters, he was first coached by Viktor Kart (an instructor of the Lviv Sports Academy) and then, as an improver, was assigned a senior master as a tutor/mentor. In his case the master was Mikhail Tal, an ex-world champion noted for his attacking chess.

In respect of chess opening theory, he has a reputation for the use of rare, offbeat and sometimes, long since discarded systems. Only by means of deep research and accurate preparation has he been able to employ these openings as weapons to sidestep known theory and fight for the full point. One example is 4.g3 in the Nimzo-Indian Defence. Previously known in the 1930s and revived by Romanishin in the 1970s, the variation now carries his name in opening manuals. The newly popular variations arising from an early Be7 in the French Defence, were also pioneered by him (and Australian postal IM John Kellner) in the 1970s and have been further refined by the likes of Morozevich and Short in more recent practice.
