= Viktor Kupreichik =

Belarusian chess grandmaster (1949–2017)

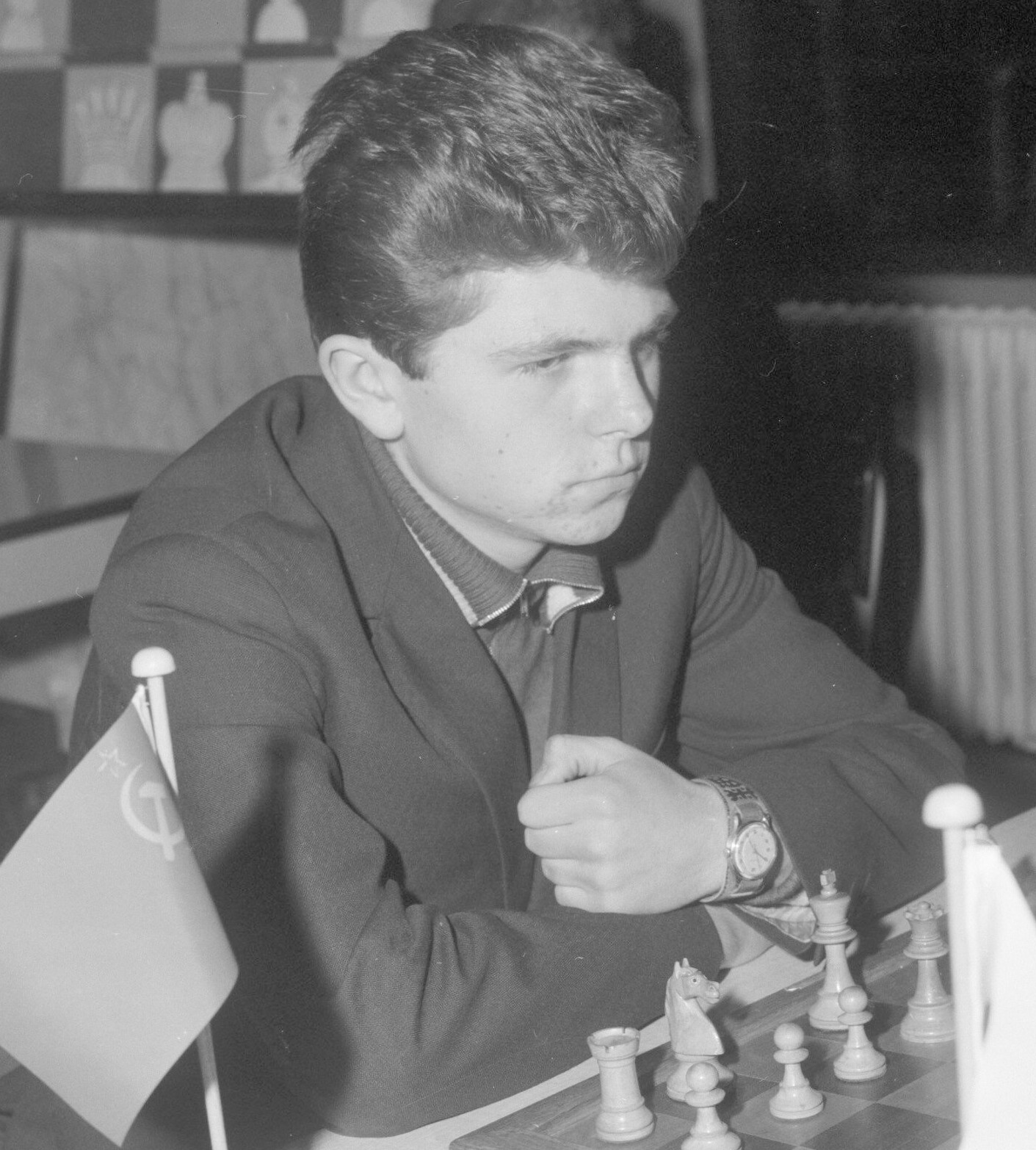
- Kupreichik (1965)

Personal information
- Born: Viktor Davidovich Kupreichik; Viktar Davydavič Kuprejčyk; 3 July 1949 Minsk, Belarusian SSR
- Died: 22 May 2017 (aged 67)

Chess career
- Country: Soviet Union→Belarus
- Title: Grandmaster (1980)
- Peak rating: 2580 (July 1981)
- Peak ranking: No. 22 (January 1981)

Viktor Davidovich Kupreichik (Russian: Ви́ктор Давыдо́вич Купре́йчик, Belarusian: Віктар Давыдавіч Купрэйчык, Viktar Davydavič Kuprejčyk; 3 July 1949 – 22 May 2017) was a Belarusian chess grandmaster.

== Career ==
At the beginning of his career, he won the individual gold medal at the 15th World Student Team Chess Championship in Ybbs in 1968 at age 19. He won the Belarusian Chess Championship in 1972 and 2003.

In 1980, he was awarded the Grandmaster title.

He also placed first at Wijk aan Zee (Masters' tournament) 1977, Kirovakan 1978 (jointly), Reykjavík 1980, Plovdiv 1980, Medina del Campo 1980, and Hastings International Chess Congress in 1981/82. In 2002 Kupreichik won the Group B of the first edition of the Aeroflot Open. In 2010, he won the European Seniors’ Rapid Championship.

The Kupreichik variation of the Sicilian Defence (1.e4 c5 2.Nf3 d6 3.d4 cxd4 4.Nxd4 Nf6 5.Nc3 Bd7) is named in his honor.

A player of real fighting chess, he would often lead tournaments in the early stages and then run out of stamina and lose heavily in the last few rounds; for example, at each of the Soviet Championships of 1979 and 1980, he won 5 consecutive games, but only finished 6th on both occasions.

He died on 22 May 2017.

== Family ==
His niece is Anastasia Sorokina.
