= List of chess books (T–Z) =

This is a list of chess books that are used as references in articles related to chess. The list is organized by alphabetical order of the author's surname, then the author's first name, then the year of publication, then the alphabetical order of title.

As a general rule, only the original edition should be listed except when different editions bring additional encyclopedic value. Examples of exceptions include:

- When various editions are different enough to be considered as nearly a different book, for example for opening encyclopedias when each edition is completely revised and has even different authors (example: Modern Chess Openings).
- When the book is too old to have an ID (ISBN, OCLC number, ...) that makes it easy for the reader to find it. In that case, both the first and the last edition can be indicated (example: My 60 Memorable Games).

Authors with five books or more have a sub-section title on their own, to increase the usability of the table of contents (see at right). When a book was written by several authors, it is listed once under the name of each author.

== T ==
- Taimanov, Mark; Cafferty, Bernard (1998). The Soviet Championships. Everyman Chess. ISBN 978-1-85744-201-4.
- Tait, Jonathan (2004). The Two Knights Defence. Everyman Chess. ISBN 978-1-85744-283-0.
- Tal, Mikhail (1997). The Life and Games of Mikhail Tal. London: Everyman Chess. ISBN 978-1-85744-202-1.
- Tangborn, Eric (1992). A Fischer Favorite: The King's Indian Attack. International Chess Enterprises. ISBN 1-879479-07-9.
- Tangborn, Eric (1993). The Complete Torre Attack. International Chess Enterprises. ISBN 1-879479-14-1.
- Tangborn, Eric; Donaldson, John W. (1999). The Unknown Bobby Fischer. International Chess Enterprises. ISBN 978-1-879479-85-2.
- Tarrasch, Siegbert (1938). The Game of Chess.
- Tartakower, Savielly; du Mont, Julius (1975). 100 Master Games of Modern Chess. Dover Publications.
- Taulbut, Shaun; Harman, Ron (1993). Winning with the Scandinavian. Henry Holt. ISBN 0-8050-2935-4.
- Taulbut, Shaun (1995). The New Bogo-Indian. Cadogan Books. ISBN 978-1-85744-026-3.
- Taulbut, Shaun (1996). Understanding the Spanish. Batsford. ISBN 0-7134-7633-8.
- Taylor, Dave; Hayward, Keith (2010). Play the Ponziani. Everyman Chess. ISBN 978-1-85744-620-3.
- Taylor, Timothy (2005). Bird's Opening: Detailed Coverage of an Underrated and Dynamic Choice for White. Gloucester Publishers. ISBN 1-85744-402-7.
- Tella, Jussi; Yrjölä, Jouni (2001). An Explosive Chess Opening Repertoire for Black. Gambit. ISBN 1-901983-50-1.
- Thanner, Herbert J. (2014). Schach spielerisch, Eltern-Kind-Lernanleitung. Cubes.Art. ISBN 978-3-200-03748-9.
- Thanner, Herbert J. (2014). Chess Junior, Parent-Child Tutorial. Cubes.Art. ISBN 978-3-951-99090-3.

=== Timman, Jan ===
- Timman, Jan (1996). Studies and Games. Simon & Schuster. ISBN 978-1-85744-126-0.
- Timman, Jan (1996). Timman's Selected Games: Chess the Adventurous Way. Simon & Schuster. ISBN 978-1-85744-121-5.
- Timman, Jan (1997). The Art of Chess Analysis. Everyman Chess. ISBN 1-85744-179-6.
- Timman, Jan; Euwe, Max (2002). Fischer World Champion!. ISBN 978-90-5691-095-2.
- Timman, Jan (2005). Curaçao 1962: The Battle of Minds that Shook the Chess World. New in Chess. ISBN 90-5691-139-2.
- Timman, Jan (2006). On the Attack: The Art of Attacking Chess According to the Modern Masters. New in Chess. ISBN 978-90-5691-187-4.
- Timman, Jan (2006). Botvinnik's Secret Games. Hardinge Simpole Publishing. ISBN 1-84382-178-8.

- Tisdall, Jonathan; Speelman, Jon; Wade, Robert (1993). Batsford Chess Endings. Batsford. ISBN 0-7134-4420-7.
- Tseitlin, Mikhail (1991). Winning with the Schliemann. Maxwell Macmillan Chess. ISBN 1-85744-017-X.
- Tseitlin, Mikhail; Glaskov, Igor (1992). The Budapest for the Tournament Player. Batsford. ISBN 978-0-8050-2431-9.
- Troitzky, Alexey (1924). 500 Endspielstudien (in German). Verlag Kagan Berlin.
- Troitzky, Alexey (1968). 360 Brilliant and Instructive End Games. Dover. ISBN 0-486-21959-3.
- Troitzky, Alexey (2006). Collection of Chess Studies. Ishi Press. ISBN 0-923891-10-2.
- Tzermiadianos, Andreas; Kotronias, Vassilios (2005). Beating The Petroff. Batsford. ISBN 978-0-7134-8919-4.
- Tzermiadianos, Andreas (2008). How to Beat the French Defence: The Essential Guide to the Tarrasch. Everyman Chess. ISBN 978-1-85744-567-1.

== U ==
- Unzicker, Wolfgang (1975). Knaurs Neues Schachbuch für Anfänger und Fortgeschrittene (in German). Droemer Knaur. ISBN 3-426-02242-7.
- Urcan, Olimpiu G. (2007). Surviving Changi. E.E. Colman: A Chess Biography. Singapore Heritage Society. ISBN 978-981-05-7922-7.
- Urcan, Olimpiu G. (2008). Adolf Albin in America: A European Chess Master's Sojourn, 1893–1895. McFarland & Company. ISBN 978-0-7864-3010-9.
- Urcan, Olimpiu G. (2010). Julius Finn: A Chess Master's Life In America, 1871–1931. McFarland & Company. ISBN 978-0-7864-4283-6.
- Urcan, Olimpiu G. (2011). Arthur Kaufmann: A Chess Biography, 1872–1938. McFarland & Company. ISBN 978-0-7864-6145-5.

== V ==
- van der Sterren, Paul (2009). Fundamental Chess Openings. Gambit. ISBN 978-1906454135.
- van der Tak, A. C. (1996). The Budapest Gambit. New In Chess. ISBN 90-5691-016-7.
- van Fondern (1982). Roman Dzindzichashvili – Sein Aufstieg zur Weltspitze (in German). Hollfeld. ISBN 90-90-11612-5.
- van Perlo, Gerardus C (2006). Van Perlo's Endgame Tactics. New In Chess. ISBN 978-90-5691-168-3.
- Vandecasteele, Ignace; Missiaen, Roger; Vandiest, Julien (1998). Flemish miniatures. 123 chess endgame studies. ISBN 90-90-11612-5.
- Vandiest, Julien; Missiaen, Roger; Vandecasteele, Ignace (1998). Flemish miniatures. 123 chess endgame studies. ISBN 90-90-11612-5.
- Vasiukov, Evgeni (1996). The Chronicle of the World Chess Championship '96. Dhzangar.
- Vegh, Endre (2004). Starting Out: The Modern Benoni. London: Everyman Chess. ISBN 978-1-857443-66-0.
- Vera, Reinaldo (2007). Chess Explained: The Meran Semi-Slav. Gambit. ISBN 978-1-904600-81-7.
- Veselý, Jiří; Modr, Břetislav (2005). 100 let organizovaného šachu v českých zemích. Příbram. ISBN 80-86595-14-5.
- Vidmar, Milan (1960). Goldene Schachzeiten: Erinnerungen. W. de Gruyter. ISBN 3-11-002095-5.
- Vigorito, David (2007). Challenging the Nimzo-Indian. Quality Chess. ISBN 978-91-976005-5-2.
- Vigorito, David (2007). Play the Semi-Slav. Quality Chess. ISBN 978-91-85779-01-7.
- de la Villa, Jesus (2008). 100 Endgames You Must Know. New in Chess. ISBN 978-90-5691-244-4.
- de la Villa, Jesus (2009). Dismantling the Sicilian. New in Chess. ISBN 978-90-5691-294-9.
- Vitiugov, Nikita (2010). The French Defence. Chess Stars. ISBN 978-954-8782-76-0.
- Volokitin, Andrei; Grabinsky, Vladimir (2007). Perfect Your Chess. Gambit Publications. ISBN 978-1-904600-82-4.
- de Voogt, Alex; Gobet, Fernand; Retschitzki, Jean (2004). Moves in mind: The psychology of board games. Psychology Press. ISBN 1-84169-336-7.
- Voronkov, Sergey; Plisetsky, Dimitry (2005). Russians versus Fischer. Everyman Chess. ISBN 1-85744-380-2.
- Vuković, Vladimir (1965). The Art of Attack in Chess. Pergamon Press. ISBN 0-08-011196-3.

== W ==
- Wade, Robert; O'Connell, Kevin J. (1972). Bobby Fischer's Chess Games. ISBN 0-385-08627-X.
- Wade, Robert; Speelman, Jon; Tisdall, Jonathan (1993). Batsford Chess Endings. Batsford. ISBN 0-7134-4420-7.
- Walker, George (1835). A selection of games at chess actually played by Philidor and his contemporaries. Sherwood Gilbert & Piper. "1."

=== Wall, Bill ===
- Wall, Bill (1982). 300 King's Gambit Miniatures. Chess Enterprises. ISBN 0-931462-17-7.
- Wall, Bill (1983). 500 Sicilian Miniatures. Chess Enterprises. ISBN 0-931462-24-X.
- Wall, Bill (1984). 500 French Miniatures. Chess Enterprises. ISBN 0-931462-31-2.
- Wall, Bill (1985). 500 Queen's Gambit Miniatures. Chess Enterprises. ISBN 0-931462-38-X.
- Wall, Bill (1986). Larsen's Opening. Chess Enterprises. ISBN 0-931462-55-X.
- Wall, Bill (1986). Owen's Defense. Chess Enterprises. ISBN 0-931462-50-9.
- Wall, Bill (1986). 500 Ruy Lopez Miniatures. Chessco. ISBN 978-0-931462-56-6.
- Wall, Bill (1986). 500 King's Gambit Miniatures. Chess Enterprises. ISBN 0-931462-57-6.
- Wall, Bill (1987). 500 Italian Miniatures. Chess Enterprises. ISBN 0-931462-65-7.
- Wall, Bill (1987). 500 Sicilian Miniatures, Collection II. Chess Enterprises. ISBN 0-931462-73-8.
- Wall, Bill (1988). Grob's Attack (1.g4). Chess Enterprises. ISBN 0-931462-86-X.
- Wall, Bill (1988). 500 Queen's Gambit Miniatures, Collection II. Chess Enterprises. ISBN 0-931462-87-8.
- Wall, Bill (1989). The Orangutan (1.b4). Chess Enterprises. ISBN 0-931462-92-4.
- Wall, Bill (1990). 500 Indian Miniatures. Chess Enterprises. ISBN 0-931462-99-1.
- Wall, Bill (1990). 500 English Miniatures. Chess Enterprises. ISBN 0-945470-04-5.
- Wall, Bill (1991). The 1990 World Chess Championship, Karpov vs. Kasparov. Chess Enterprises. ISBN 0-945470-08-8.
- Wall, Bill (1991). 500 Caro Kann Miniatures. Chess Enterprises. ISBN 0-945470-15-0.
- Wall, Bill (1992). Smith-Morra Accepted. Chess Enterprises. ISBN 0-945470-22-3.
- Wall, Bill (1993). Smith-Morra Declined. Chess Enterprises. ISBN 0-945470-25-8.
- Wall, Bill (1993). 500 Pirc Miniatures. Chess Enterprises. ISBN 0-945470-38-X.
- Wall, Bill (1994). 500 Alekhine Miniatures. Chess Enterprises. ASIN B000I3Z45U.
- Wall, Bill (1994). 1.Nc3 Dunst Opening. Chess Enterprises. ISBN 0-945470-48-7.
- Wall, Bill (1995). 500 French Miniatures, Collection II. Chess Enterprises. ISBN 0-945470-54-1.
- Wall, Bill (1996). 500 King's Gambit, Collection II. Chess Enterprises. ISBN 0-945470-61-4.
- Wall, Bill (1997). 500 Scotch Miniatures. Chess Enterprises. ISBN 0-945470-89-4.
- Wall, Bill (1998). 700 Opening Traps. Chess Enterprises. ISBN 0-945470-71-1.
- Wall, Bill (1999). 500 Blackmar Diemer Gambit Miniatures. Chess Enterprises. ISBN 0-945470-80-0.
- Wall, Bill (2001). 500 Center Counter Miniatures. Chess Enterprises. ISBN 0-945470-85-1.
- Wall, Bill (2001). Off The Wall Chess Trivia. ChessCentral. ISBN 1-886846-33-2.
- Wall, Bill; Gifford, Gary; Rozzoni, Davide (2008). Winning with the Krazy kat and Old Hippo. Lulu. ISBN 978-0-557-00343-3.
- Wall, Bill (2019). 700 Opening Traps. Amazon. ISBN 978-1708915124.
- Wall, Bill (2019). Mate in Three. Amazon. ISBN 978-1675985496.
- Wall, Bill (2020). Chess Opening Blunders. Amazon. ISBN 978-1660738885.
- Wall, Bill (2020). Oddities in Chess. Amazon. ISBN 979-8608854613.
- Wall, Bill (2020). 600 Sicilian Miniatures. Amazon. ISBN 979-8623526014.
- Wall, Bill (2020). Oddities in Science. Amazon. ISBN 979-8636066040.
- Wall, Bill (2020). 600 King's Gambit Miniatures. Amazon. ISBN 979-8638413606.
- Wall, Bill (2020). Oddities in History. Amazon. ISBN 979-8662901643.
- Wall, Bill (2020). 600 Queens Gambit. Amazon. ISBN 979-8667111825.
- Wall, Bill (2020). 600 French Miniatures. Amazon. ISBN 979-8689856612.
- Wall, Bill (2020). 600 English Miniatures. Amazon. ISBN 979-8558433340.
- Wall, Bill (2021). 500 Orangutan Games. Amazon. ISBN 979-8706702182.
- Wall, Bill (2021). 600 Ruy Lopez Miniatures. Amazon. ISBN 979-8714537974.
- Wall, Bill (2021). 800 Chess Traps. Amazon. ISBN 979-8723109834.
- Wall, Bill (2021). 500 Larson's Opening Games. Amazon. ISBN 979-8739414144.
- Wall, Bill (2021). 500 Owen's Defense. Amazon. ISBN 979-8513150848.

=== Ward, Chris ===
- Ward, Chris (1994). Winning With the Dragon. Batsford. ISBN 0-7134-7210-3.
- Ward, Chris (1996). Endgame Play. Batsford. ISBN 0-7134-7920-5.
- Ward, Chris (1999). The Queen's Gambit Accepted. Batsford. ISBN 0-7134-8467-5.
- Ward, Chris (2001). Winning With the Sicilian Dragon 2. Batsford. ISBN 0-7134-8236-2.
- Ward, Chris (2002). Unusual Queen's Gambit Declined. Everyman Chess. ISBN 1-85744-218-0.
- Ward, Chris (2002). It's Your Move. Everyman Chess. ISBN 1-85744-278-4.
- Ward, Chris (2004). Starting Out: Rook Endgames. Everyman Chess. ISBN 1-85744-374-8.
- Ward, Chris (2004). The Controversial Samisch King's Indian. Batsford. ISBN 978-0-7134-8872-2.
- Ward, Chris (2005). Offbeat Nimzo-Indian. Everyman Chess. ISBN 1-85744-369-1.
- Ward, Chris (2006). Play The Queen's Gambit. Everyman Chess. ISBN 1-85744-411-6.

- Waterman, Dennis; Grefe, John (1981). The Best of Lone Pine. Great Neck, New York: R.H.M. Press. ISBN 0-89058-049-9.
- Watkins, John J. (2004). Across the Board: The Mathematics of Chess Problems. Princeton University Press. ISBN 0-691-11503-6.

=== Watson, John ===
- Watson, John (1981). Queen's Gambit, Chigorin Defence. Batsford. ISBN 978-0-7134-3996-0.
- Watson, John (1986). Play the French. Pergamon Press. ISBN 0-08-026929-X.
- Watson, John; Schiller, Eric (1995). The Big Book of Busts. Hypermodern Press. ISBN 1-886040-13-3.
- Watson, John (1998). Secrets of Modern Chess Strategy: Advances since Nimzowitsch. Gambit. ISBN 1-901983-07-2.
- Watson, John (2001). The Gambit Guide to the Modern Benoni. London: Gambit Publications. ISBN 1-901983-23-4.
- Watson, John (2003). Chess Strategy In Action. Gambit. ISBN 1-901983-69-2.
- Watson, John (2006). Mastering the Chess Openings, vol 1. Gambit. ISBN 978-1-904600-60-2.
- Watson, John (2007). Mastering the Chess Openings, vol 2. Gambit. ISBN 978-1-904600-69-5.
- Watson, John (2008). Mastering the Chess Openings, vol 3. Gambit. ISBN 978-1-904600-98-5.
- Watson, John (2010). Mastering the Chess Openings, vol 4. Gambit. ISBN 978-1-906454-19-7.

- Webb, Simon (2005). Chess for Tigers. Batsford. ISBN 0-7134-8988-X.
- Wells, Peter (1998). The Scotch Game. Sterling. ISBN 978-0-7134-8466-3.
- Wells, Peter (2004). Winning With the Trompowsky. Sterling. ISBN 978-0-7134-8795-4.
- Wells, Peter (2007). Grandmaster Secrets – The Caro-Kann. Gambit Publications. ISBN 978-1-904600-61-9.
- Whitaker, Norman T.; Hartleb, Glenn (1960). 365 Selected Endings.

=== White, John Herbert ===
- White, John Herbert; Griffith, Richard (1911). Modern Chess Openings (1st ed.).
- White, John Herbert; Griffith, Richard (1913). Modern Chess Openings (2nd ed.). Longmans & Green.
- White, John Herbert; Griffith, Richard (1916). Modern Chess Openings (3rd ed.). Longmans & Green.
- White, John Herbert; Goldstein, Maurice Edward; Griffith, Richard; Sergeant, Philip Walsingham (1925). Modern Chess Openings (4th ed.). Whitehead & Miller.
- White, John Herbert; Goldstein, Maurice Edward; Griffith, Richard; Sergeant, Philip Walsingham (1932). Modern Chess Openings (5th ed.). Whitehead & Miller.
- White, John Herbert; Fine, Reuben; Griffith, Richard; Sergeant, Philip Walsingham (1939). Modern Chess Openings (6th ed.). Whitehead & Miller.
- White, John Herbert; Griffith, Richard; Korn, Walter; Sergeant, Philip Walsingham (1946). Modern Chess Openings (7th ed.). Sir Isaac Pitman & Sons.

- Whitworth, Timothy G.; Beasley, John D. (1996). Endgame Magic. Batsford. ISBN 978-0-7134-7971-3.
- Whyld, Kenneth; Hooper, David (1984). The Oxford Companion to Chess. Oxford University Press. ISBN 0-19-217540-8.
- Whyld, Kenneth (1986). Guinness Chess, The Records. ISBN 0-85112-455-0.
- Whyld, Kenneth (2006). Chess Christmas. ISBN 80-7189-559-8.
- Wieteck, Helmut (2005). Salo Flohr und das Schachleben in der Tschechoslawakei (in German). Neu-Jung Verlag. ISBN 3-933648-26-2.
- Wilkinson, Ian (2004). Magnificence In Bled - The 35th. Chess Olympiad. Lmh Publishers. ISBN 976-8184-92-2.
- Williams, Gareth John (2000). Master Pieces: The Architecture of Chess. ISBN 0-670-89381-1.

=== Williams, Simon ===
- Williams, Simon (2003). Play The Classical Dutch. Gambit Publications. ISBN 978-1-901983-88-3.
- Williams, Simon (2004). Improve Your Attacking Chess. Gambit Publications. ISBN 978-1-904600-09-1.
- Williams, Simon (2008). How To Crush Your Chess Opponents. Gambit Publications. ISBN 978-1-904600-99-2.
- Williams, Simon (2009). The New Sicilian Dragon. Everyman Chess. ISBN 978-1-85744-615-9.
- Williams, Simon (2010). How To Win At Chess - Quickly!. Everyman Chess. ISBN 978-1-85744-631-9.
- Williams, Simon; Palliser, Richard; Vigus, James (2010). Dangerous Weapons: The Dutch. Everyman Chess. ISBN 978-1-85744-624-1.

- Wilson, Gavin (1989). Crack the Frutch: How to Play the Kingston Defence. Phnumpic Press. ISBN 0-9514103-0-X.
- Wilts, Gerd; Frolkin, Andrei (1991). Shortest Proof Games.

=== Winter, Edward ===
- Winter, Edward (1981). World Chess Champions. Pergamon. ISBN 0-08-024094-1.
- Winter, Edward (1996). Chess Explorations. Cadogan. ISBN 1-85744-171-0.
- Winter, Edward (1999). Kings, Commoners and Knaves: Further Chess Explorations. Russell Enterprises. ISBN 1-888690-04-6.
- Winter, Edward (2003). A Chess Omnibus. Russell Enterprises. ISBN 1-888690-17-8.
- Winter, Edward (2005). Chess Facts and Fables. McFarland. ISBN 978-0-7864-2310-1.

- Winter, William (1965) [1936]. Chess for Match Players. Dover.
- Wood, Gaby (2002). Living Dolls: a Magical History of the Quest for Mechanical Life. Faber & Faber. ISBN 0-571-17879-0.

== X ==
- Xie Jun (1998). Chess Champion from China: The Life and Games of Xie Jun. Gambit Publications. ISBN 1-901983-06-4.

== Y ==
- Yakovich, Yuri (2004). Play The 4 f3 Nimzo-Indian. Gambit Publications. ISBN 978-1-904600-16-9.
- Yakovich, Yuri (2010). Sicilian Attacks. New In Chess. ISBN 978-90-5691-332-8.
- Yakovlev, Nikolay (2010). Planning in the Middlegame. Mongoose Press. ISBN 978-1-936277-01-8.
- Yermolinsky, Alex (2000). Road to Chess Improvement. Gambit Publications. ISBN 1-901983-24-2.
- Yermolinsky, Alex (2006). Chess Explained: The Classical Sicilian. Gambit Publications. ISBN 1-904600-42-5.
- Yrjölä, Jouni; Tella, Jussi (2001). An Explosive Chess Opening Repertoire for Black. Gambit. ISBN 1-901983-50-1.
- Yudovich, Mikhail; Kotov, Alexander (1958). The Soviet School of Chess. Hardinge Simpole (2002 ed.). ISBN 978-1-84382-007-9. (2002 ed.).
- Yudovich, Mikhail (1988). Garri Kasparov. Raduga. ISBN 5-05-001722-X.

=== Yusupov, Artur ===
- Yusupov, Artur; Dvoretsky, Mark (2006). Secrets of Chess Training. Olms. ISBN 978-3-283-00515-3.
- Yusupov, Artur; Dvoretsky, Mark (2007). Secrets of Opening Preparation. Olms. ISBN 978-3-283-00516-0.
- Yusupov, Artur; Dvoretsky, Mark (2008). Secrets of Endgame Technique. Olms. ISBN 978-3-283-00517-7.
- Yusupov, Artur; Dvoretsky, Mark (2008). Secrets of Positional Play. Olms. ISBN 978-3-283-00518-4.
- Yusupov, Artur; Dvoretsky, Mark (2009). Secrets of Creative Thinking. Olms. ISBN 978-3-283-00519-1.

== Z ==
- Zagororovsky, Vladimir (1982). Romantic Chess Openings. ISBN 0-7134-3623-9.
- Zavodny, Zdenek (1997). Let Budapestskeho gambitu 1917–1997:A51-A52 (in Czech). Brno: SNZZ. ASIN B000VLHGZK.
- Zelepukhin, N.P. (1982). Dictionary of Chess. French & European Pubns. ISBN 0-8288-2350-2.
- Zeuthen, Steffen (1973). Modern Benoni. Denmark: Zeuss Transactions. ISBN 87-87461-00-5.
- von Zimmerman, Georg (2006). Bughouse Chess. Books on Demand GmbH. ISBN 3-8334-6811-4.
- Znosko-Borovsky, Eugene (1940). How to Play Chess Endings.
- Znosko-Borovsky, Eugene (1977). The Art of Chess Combination. Dover. ISBN 0-486-20583-5.
- Znosko-Borovsky, Eugene (1980). The Middle Game in Chess. Dover. ISBN 0-486-23931-4.

== See also ==
- List of chess books (A–F)
- List of chess books (G–L)
- List of chess books (M–S)
- Chess endgame literature
