= Laura Aspis Prize =

Chess award

The Laura Aspis Prize (also referred to as the Aspis Prize or Aspis Award) was an award in the game of chess. Beginning in 1980, it was awarded annually to the number one ranked American chess player under the age of 13 by the nonprofit educational foundation Chess-in-the-Schools (formerly known as the American Chess Foundation) until 1999.

The first winner of the prize was John Litvinchuk, who became the US Junior Chess Champion in 1986. The prize offered a trophy and $1,500. It was funded by Dr. Samuel L. Aspis and presented in memory of his late wife Laura. Winners included 1989 U.S. Champion Stuart Rachels (1982), 1990 World Junior Champion Ilya Gurevich (1983), K. K. Karanja (1985), 1997 World Junior Champion Tal Shaked (1991), Jordy Mont-Reynaud (1994), Vinay Bhat (1996), and 2005 & 2009 U.S. Champion Hikaru Nakamura (1999).
