= Vinay Bhat =

American chess grandmaster (born 1984)

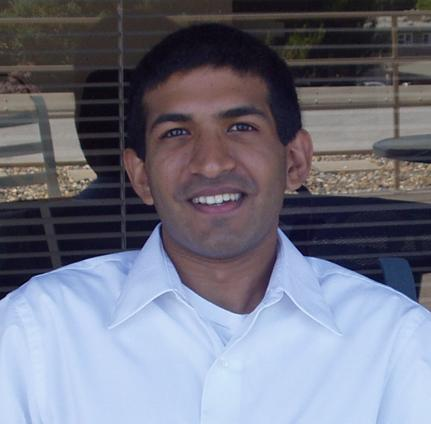
- Bhat in 2007

Personal information
- Born: Vinay Subrahmanya Bhat; June 4, 1984 (age 42) Santa Clara, California, U.S.

Chess career
- Country: United States
- Title: Grandmaster (2008)
- FIDE rating: 2519 (July 2026)
- Peak rating: 2549 (March 2010)

Vinay Subrahmanya Bhat (born June 4, 1984) is an American chess player who holds the FIDE title of Grandmaster (GM).

== Chess career ==
=== Junior years ===
Bhat first learned to play chess at the age of 6. His mother taught him and his older brother, Harish (now a professor at UC Merced) how to play. The two brothers started playing in the Kolty Chess Club in Campbell every Thursday night. Bhat spent his early years studying the games of Paul Morphy and José Raúl Capablanca as a part of the Blue Knights. "That was my steady diet," Bhat said. Bhat studied chess with GM Gregory Kaidanov.

At 10 years and 176 days old, Bhat became the youngest national master, breaking the record previously held by Jordy Mont-Reynaud (10 years and 294 days), Stuart Rachels (11 years and 10 months), and before that by Bobby Fischer (age 13). Since then, his record has been broken three times, by Hikaru Nakamura, Nicholas Nip, and Samuel Sevian. In 1998, Bhat contributed to "Whiz Kids Teach Chess" (ISBN 1-58042-007-9) with Eric Schiller.

At the age of 15 years and 10 months, Bhat became an International Master, at the time the youngest ever in U.S. history; this record was later surpassed by Hikaru Nakamura, Samuel Sevian, Ray Robson, and is presently held by Awonder Liang.

=== Notable junior tournament results and awards ===
- 1992 California Primary School (K-3) State Champion (Tied with Jordy Mont-Reynaud)
- Tied for second at the Under-12 World Youth Championships in 1995 (won by Etienne Bacrot)
- Winner of the 1996 Laura Aspis Prize for the top-ranked American chess player under the age of 13
- Tied for second at the Under-12 World Youth Rapid Chess Championships in 1996 (won by Kamil Mitoń)
- Bronze medal winner at the Under-12 World Youth Championships in 1996 (won by Kamil Mitoń)
- Tied for third at the Under-14 World Youth Championships in 1998 (won by Bu Xiangzhi)
- Tied for first at US Cadet (Under-16) Championships in 1998 (with Dmitri Schneider)
- Gold medal (clear first place) at the Under-14 Pan-American Championships in Brazil in 1998
- Four-time California High School (K-12) State Champion
- Three-time winner of the Neil Falconer Award for top-ranked CA junior chessplayer from 2000 to 2002
- Tied for first in the High School Division of the CEA Nationals (with Harutyan Akopyan) in 2000

=== Later chess career ===
After taking an extended break from chess, Bhat began to play regularly again in 2008. On April 22, 2008, it was announced that Vinay was awarded the 2008 Samford Fellowship. This fellowship was created to "identify and assist the best American chessmasters under the age of twenty-five by providing top-level coaching, strong competition and access to study materials."

Bhat was awarded with the title of International Grandmaster in October 2008 when he crossed 2500 FIDE, with his three Grandmaster norms coming from Qingdao (China, 2002), Balaguer (Spain, 2006), and Balaguer (Spain, 2007).

=== Other notable tournament results ===
- Clear first place at the 2005 Michael Frannett Memorial in California
- Tied for first at the 2007 International Open of Balaguer in Spain (with Aleksander Delchev)
- Tied for first at the 2009 International Open of San Sebastian in Spain (with 4 others)
- Tied for first at the 2009 SPICE Cup in Texas (with Eugene Perelshteyn and Ben Finegold)
- Bhat also has the second longest undefeated streak in the league (14 matches across three seasons), with Alex Lenderman holding the current record
- Along with Julio Becerra Rivero, Bhat is the only player to have multiple wins in the US Chess League against the highest-ranked US player Hikaru Nakamura

== Education ==
Bhat graduated from Lynbrook High School in San Jose, CA, in 2002. While at Lynbrook, he played on his school's chess team, leading it to victory in local state and high-school competitions.

Instead of focusing solely on chess, Bhat chose to continue his education and received a B.S. in Statistics and Political Economy from the University of California, Berkeley in 2006. In 2004, while an undergraduate, Bhat co-founded the East Bay Chess Club.

== Career outside of chess ==
Until receiving the Samford Fellowship, Bhat was employed at Cornerstone Research, an economic consulting firm headquartered in Menlo Park, CA.

After two-and-a-half years of professional chess play, Bhat began working full-time again in December 2010. He worked at Shipt, where he was the Head of Data Science.

== Bibliography ==
- "Whiz Kids Teach Chess," ISBN 1-58042-007-9

Achievements
Preceded by Jordy Mont-Reynaud	Youngest ever United States chessmaster 1995-1998	Succeeded by Hikaru Nakamura
