= Chessgames.com =

Internet chess website

Screenshot of Chessgames.com main page

Chessgames.com is a chess website by Chessgames Services LLC that maintains a database of chess games combined with discussion forums. Chessgames.com co-founder Daniel Freeman described the site as "a worldwide chess community where anybody from anywhere can come to discuss anything they want about chess." Grandmaster Raymond Keene described Chessgames.com as "one of the best free-to-view sites".

== Website ==
As of May 2026, the site reported that it had more than 2 million games in its database, and more than 350,000 registered users, about 1.5% of whom had logged in to the site in the last 90 days. The site is also available to unregistered users.

The website includes:

- Search options that allow users to find specific games
- The ability for users to kibitz (comment) on games
- Player biographies
- A "Game of the Day"
- Opening Explorer and Position Search tools

Games are sometimes broadcast live on the site. For example, their live broadcasts of the 2004 World Championship match between Vladimir Kramnik and Peter Leko enabled viewers to watch the match after another site broadcasting the match was attacked by hackers.

== History ==
Chessgames.com was founded in 2001 by Daniel Freeman and Alberto Artidiello. They developed software to integrate a chess database with a discussion forum, so that all games and players have a unique message board.

From 2006 through 2014, Chessgames.com organized consultation games, each of which pitted a Grandmaster or an International Correspondence Chess Grandmaster against "The World," which was a team of all the Chessgames.com members who wished to participate. Each player or team was allowed several days to choose his, her or their next move. The World team at Chessgames.com played about one game per year, achieving a record of 6 wins, 4 draws, and no losses. The World team defeated International Correspondence Chess Grandmaster Arno Nickel, former World Correspondence Chess Champion Gert Jan Timmerman, and Grandmasters Yuri Shulman, Varuzhan Akobian, Simon Kim Williams, and Arkadij Naiditsch.

Co-founder Alberto Artidiello died on March 1, 2015, at the age of 56. Co-founder and longtime webmaster Daniel Freeman died on July 24, 2018, at the age of 50.

== Criticism ==
The online chess magazine Kingpin criticized Chessgames.com for allowing anyone to comment there, regardless of playing strength.

Chess historian Olimpiu G. Urcan criticized Chessgames.com for errors, omissions, and failure to cite sources. Chess historian Edward Winter criticized the site for incorrect and misattributed quotations. Tim Harding wrote: "I would never dream of using chessgames.com as a source for any kind of historical data." Chessgames.com acknowledges that the site contains errors and encourages users to submit corrections.
