= Bruce Pandolfini =

American chess coach (born 1947)

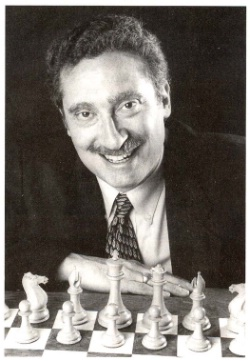
- Pandolfini in 2000

Personal information
- Born: September 17, 1947 (age 79) Lakewood, New Jersey, US

Chess career
- Country: United States
- Title: National master
- Peak rating: 2241 (January 1970)

Bruce Pandolfini (born September 17, 1947) is an American chess author, teacher and coach. A USCF national master, he is often considered to be one of America's most experienced chess teachers.

In 1983, Pandolfini was the chess consultant to author Walter Tevis for the novel The Queen's Gambit. Pandolfini returned as consultant for the 2020 Netflix miniseries of the same name.

As a coach and trainer, Pandolfini has possibly conducted more chess sessions than anyone in the world. By the summer of 2015 he had given an estimated 25,000 private and group lessons. Pandolfini's list of successful students includes Fabiano Caruana, one of the highest ranked chess players in history; Josh Waitzkin, subject of the film Searching for Bobby Fischer; Rachel Crotto, two-time U.S. Women's Chess Champion; and Jeff Sarwer, the 1988 Under-10 World Chess Champion and now professional poker player. Other notable players receiving lessons as children from Pandolfini include grandmasters Joel Benjamin, three-time U.S. Chess Champion; and Max Dlugy, 1985 World Junior Chess Champion. On the September 2015 USCF rating list, several of his students continue to be among the nation's top ranked scholastic players.

== Biography ==
=== Early life ===
Pandolfini was born in Lakewood, New Jersey, and grew up in Brooklyn, New York. His interest in chess was first realized when he was thirteen. He was browsing in a public library, when he came upon the chess section. There were more than thirty books on the shelf. The library permitted an individual to take out a certain number of books at a time. Pandolfini took out an initial batch of six books and then went back enough times that day to clear out the entire section. Then he skipped school for a month, instead immersing himself in the withdrawn chess books.

=== Chess player ===
Although Pandolfini hadn't played in many tournaments, he reached chess master strength by his late teens. Pandolfini's playing career ended in 1970 after a loss to Grandmaster Larry Evans at the National Open in Las Vegas in 1970. After his final tournament game, his official USCF rating was 2241.

=== Chess teaching career ===
In the summer of 1972, while still working at the Strand Bookstore in Greenwich Village, Pandolfini became an analyst for the PBS coverage of the "Match of the Century" when Bobby Fischer won the World Chess Championship from Boris Spassky in Reykjavík, Iceland. Pandolfini served as an assistant to Shelby Lyman, the show's moderator, and at the time, America's top chess teacher.

Pandolfini's teaching career began immediately after the Championship. Starting with private instruction and small seminars, Pandolfini, with George Kane and Frank Thornally, formed U. S. Chess Masters, Inc., an educational organization that structured systematized programs to a wide range of players. In 1973 the same group began teaching chess classes for credit at the New School for Social Research, one of the first such courses ever offered in America. (The first for-credit course was taught in January 1972 by FM Allan Savage at Clark University.) Pandolfini remained on the faculty of the New School until 1991.

Through the years, and while maintaining an active private practice, Pandolfini also taught chess and lectured on the game in many different schools and clubs, including the Shelby Lyman Chess Institute, Stuyvesant High School, Lehman College, New York University, Hunter College, the Harvard Club, the University of Alabama, the New York Athletic Club, and the Rockefeller Institute.

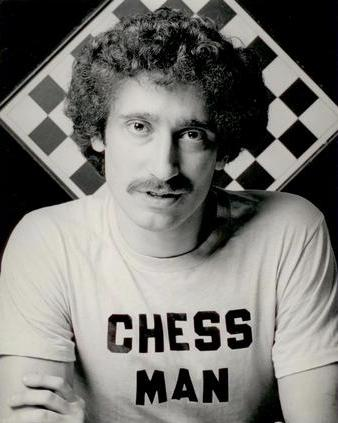
Bruce Pandolfini in 1978

=== The 1980s and beyond ===
In the 1980s Pandolfini's career took different turns. From 1980 to 1981 he was a spokesman for Mattel Electronics, with his picture appearing on the box of Mattel's initial version of a computer chess game. During those same years Pandolfini became the director of the Chess Institute at the Marshall Chess Club, heading a staff of 23 teachers and masters. At about the same time, Pandolfini developed his longtime relationship with Simon & Schuster, creating the Fireside Chess Library in 1983. In addition to his Simon & Schuster involvement, Pandolfini published a number of books with Random House and several other publishers.

In 1984, Pandolfini became the executive director of the Manhattan Chess Club, then at Carnegie Hall, a position he retained until 1987. It was from the platform of the Manhattan Chess Club that Pandolfini and Faneuil Adams co-founded in 1986 the Manhattan Chess Club School, which was later renamed as Chess-in-the-Schools, an organization that since its formation has provided free chess instruction to thousands of New York City school children.

Several years later, Pandolfini was featured in Fred Waitzkin's book Searching for Bobby Fischer (1988), a perceptive narrative on his talented son Josh and Josh's successes in the world of children's chess. The book later (in 1992) became a Paramount Pictures film of the same title, in which Pandolfini, Josh's real-life teacher, was portrayed by award-winning actor Ben Kingsley. Pandolfini was the film's chief chess consultant, training the actors and creating the scenario chess positions. Subsequent films Pandolfini consulted on were Fresh and Point of No Return.

In 1990, Pandolfini was the chief commentator at the New York half of the Garry Kasparov–Anatoly Karpov World Chess Championship Match. Later that same year, he was the head coach of the American delegation to the World Youth Chess Championship in Fond du Lac, Wisconsin. In addition to co-creating the Chess-in-the-Schools program for public schools, Pandolfini has been associated with various private institutions, including long-time relationships with Trinity, Browning, Dalton, and Berkeley Carroll.

Pandolfini was a consultant to The Queen's Gambit, a 2020 American Netflix miniseries, where he also had a cameo role as a tournament director. He had also been a consultant to the original 1983 novel, for which he suggested the title.

In 2025, Pandolfini was inducted into the US Chess Hall of Fame.

== Teaching principles ==
In his books and columns, Pandolfini has explained his methodology for individual instruction, indicating that it consists of four basic parts.

1. Regular review of the student's games and play;
2. Constant practice and examination without moving the pieces;
3. Gradual mastery of endgame basics and fundamentals;
4. Step-by-step instilling of the analytic method.

The latter he achieves by relentlessly posing relevant questions, until the student absorbs the process of determining reasonable options and making logical choices.

Starting in the 1980s, Pandolfini identified and filled a role producing books especially for novices and intermediate players. His books have been influential and continue to be steady bestsellers.

One of the first chess writers in America to rely on algebraic chess notation, Pandolfini created and/or popularized a few other innovations in instructional chess writing. It had been common for chess authors to list several moves before showing a diagram. Pandolfini realized beginning players struggle with that format. Most of his books display larger diagrams, often with verbalized explanations (instead of a mere series of notated chess moves), so that beginning and casual players can examine games with greater ease and comprehension.

=== "Pandolfinisms" ===
Another aspect to Pandolfini's teaching is his reliance on short, pithy, often counterintuitive statements to seize the student's attention and stimulate imagination:

- Simplify when winning; complicate when losing.
- Play the board, not the player, unless you know something about the player.
- Sacrifice your opponent's pieces before sacrificing your own.
- A principle says where to look, not what to see.
- Master the principles so you can know when to break them.
- Don't just do something. Sit there.
- The biggest mistake is to think you can't make one.
- Learn from your mistakes, especially not to repeat them.
- Don't consider everything, just everything that matters.
- Solve it yourself and it's yours for life.
- Every win is first won in practice.
- Don't ignore an opening move just because you used to rely on it.
- Bad players can play good moves by accident.
- No one ever won by resigning.

=== Convenient shortcuts to presentation ===
Not only has Pandolfini relied on terse, often epigrammatic phrasings of principles, he typically provides useful constructs for remembering and reinforcing them. One aspect that Pandolfini has codified nicely concerns planning, an area of chess thinking with which students tend to have difficulty. Indeed, in choosing plans, students often opt for courses of action opposed to what they should be doing. For example, students thoughtlessly complicate when they should be simplifying or simplify when they should be complicating. The following chart, from Pandolfini’s Chess Complete (Fireside Chess Library, 1992), is an example of his use of classification to enable students to recall and access basic chess strategies:

Enemy Problem	Do This Against It
Bad minor piece	Avoid its exchange; keep it restricted
Blocked pieces	Keep them blocked
Cramped game	Avoid freeing exchanges
Down the Exchange	Use rook to set up winning endgame
Exposed king	Threaten with pieces; set up double attacks
Ill-timed flank attack	Counter in the center
Lack of development	Look for tactics and combinations
Unprotected pieces	Play for double attacks
Material disadvantage	Trade pieces, not pawns
Weak castled position	Open lines; invade on weak squares
Overextended pawns	Attack with pieces
Pawn-grabbing	Exploit disarray; storm the king
Pinned units	Pile up on them
Early queen moves	Attack it with development
Time trouble	Find good, but surprising threats
Uncastled king	Prevent castling; open the center
Under heavy attack	Shun simplification until gain
Unfavorable majorities	Create passed pawn
Weak pawns	Fix, exploit and attack
Weak squares	Occupy them

== Match commentary ==
Apart from commenting on the Fischer-Spassky match, Pandolfini appeared as a guest commentator at the 2016 Carlsen-Karjakin match that took place in New York City. He also appeared as a guest commentator at the 2021 Candidates Tournament and predicted that Carlsen might lose the match to the challenger Ian Nepomniachtchi.

== Writings ==
Pandolfini has written a monthly column for the magazine Chess Life titled The ABC's of Chess since 1979. This column once featured endgame lessons, then monthly tutorials on openings, but since the early 1990s has evolved into Solitaire Chess, an instructional column inviting readers to guess the moves played in a single chess game. Pandolfini also has written regular features for ChessCafe.com (The Q & A Way) and Chess.com, both of which offer online services. But it is as an author of chess books that his writings are perhaps best known. Pandolfini has to his credit more than thirty titles on the game of chess. Some of Bruce Pandolfini's output has been criticized for its inaccuracy and lack of sources.

=== Books ===
- Let's Play Chess (Simon & Schuster, 1980)
- Bobby Fischer's Outrageous Chess Moves (Fireside Chess Library, 1985)
- One Move Chess By The Champions (Fireside Chess Library, 1985)
- ABC's of Chess (Fireside Chess Library, 1986)
- Principles of the New Chess (Fireside Chess Library, 1986)
- Kasparov's Winning Chess Tactics (Fireside Chess Library, 1986)
- Russian Chess (Fireside Chess Library, 1987)
- Pandolfini's Endgame Course: Basic Endgame Concepts Explained by America's Leading Chess Teacher (Fireside Chess Library, 1988)
- Best of Chess Life and Review, Volume 1 (Fireside Chess Library, 1988)
- Best of Chess Life and Review, Volume 2 (Fireside Chess Library, 1988)
- Chess Openings: Traps And Zaps (Fireside Chess Library, 1989)
- Weapons of Chess: An Omnibus of Chess Strategies (Fireside Chess Library, 1989)
- Chessercizes: New Winning Techniques for Players of All Levels (Fireside Chess Library, 1991)
- More Chessercizes: Checkmate: 300 Winning Strategies for Players of All Levels (Fireside Chess Library, 1991)
- Pandolfini's Chess Complete: The Most Comprehensive Guide to the Game, from History to Strategy (Fireside Chess Library, 1992)
- Beginning Chess: Over 300 Elementary Problems for Players New to the Game (Fireside Chess Library, 1993)
- More Chess Openings: Traps and Zaps 2 (Fireside Chess Library, 1993)
- Square One: A Chess Drill Book for Beginners (Fireside Chess Library, 1994)
- Chess Target Practice: Battle Tactics for Every Square on the Board (Fireside Chess Library, 1994)
- Chess Thinking: The Visual Dictionary of Chess Moves, Rules, Strategies and Concepts (Fireside Chess Library, 1995)
- Chess Doctor: Surefire Cures for What Ails Your Game (Fireside Chess Library, 1995)
- Power Mates: Essential Checkmating Strategies and Techniques (Fireside Chess Library, 1996)
- Kasparov and Deep Blue: The Historic Chess Match Between Man and Machine (Fireside Chess Library, 1997)
- The Winning Way (Fireside Chess Library, 1998)
- Pandolfini's Ultimate Guide to Chess (Fireside Chess Library, 2003)
- Q&A Way in Chess (Random House, 2005)
- Solitaire Chess (Random House, 2005)
- Treasure Chess: Trivia, Quotes, Puzzles, and Lore from the World's Oldest Game (Random House, 2007)
- Pandolfini's Chess Challenges: 111 Winning Endgames (Random House, 2007)
- Let's Play Chess: A Step by Step Guide for New Players (The Pandolfini Chess Library – Russell Enterprises, 2008)
- Endgame Workshop: Principles for the Practical Player (Russell Enterprises, 2009)
- The Rules of Chess (Russell Enterprises, 2010)
- Chess Movies 1 (Russell Enterprises, 2010)
- Chess Movies 2: The Means and Ends (Russell Enterprises, 2011)

=== Apps, videos, and DVDs ===
- Understanding Chess - Pandolfini on Video: Master teacher Bruce Pandolfini Teaches the Elements and Tactical Themes of Chess (1990)
- Opening Principles (Pandolfini on VHS, 1990)
- Chess Starts Here (Waitzkin & Pandolfini) – Audio (Chess Beat LLC, 1996)
- Chessmaster 8000 ("Match the Masters" feature, 2000)
- Every Move Must Have a Purpose: Strategies From Chess for Business and Life (Hyperion, 2003; Listen and Live Audio, Inc., 2003)
- Pandolfini's Mate in One (eXQuisite Software, 2012) — App

== Awards and honors ==
In 2011 Pandolfini was elected to the American Chess Journalists Hall of Fame, and in 2012, he was named as Chess Educator of the Year by University of Texas at Dallas.

== Quotes ==
"Playing chess gives us a chance to start out life over again, and this time, no one has more money than us, no one is more beautiful, no one lives in a better neighborhood, and we all go to the same school. Other than having the first move (and this benefit is shared equally) no one starts with any unfair advantage.
— Chess Life magazine

"Chess is art. Chess is sport. But it's also war. You have to master on the order of a hundred thousand different chess ideas and concepts, patterns of pawns and pieces. That takes work. And you're going to lose a lot of games in the process, so you'll have to be able to make your peace with that, which isn't easy. Because there is no luck involved in the game, you have to face the fact that you lost because your opponent outwitted you. Ninety per cent of my students give up on tournament chess when they get into junior high school and the main reason is that they can't stand losing."
— The New Yorker interview (June 4, 2001), p. 73.

"If you rely on your own judgment, either of two good things will happen. Either you’ll be right, and succeed, or you’ll be wrong, and learn something."
—Let’s Play Chess, 1980

"We don't really know how the game was invented, though there are suspicions. As soon as we discover the culprits, we'll let you know."
— Chess Cafe, 2004

"The polarity is clear. When you teach, you're trying to help someone (the student), and when you play, you're trying to hurt someone (the opponent). Both of these situations — being too sympathetic while playing or too antipathetic while teaching — are not necessarily perceived, since they tend to exist on the unconscious level."
— 2007

"Chess is a creative process. Its purpose is to find the truth. To discover the truth, you must be uncompromising. You must be brave."

"The two most important forms of intelligence are the ability to read other people and the ability to understand oneself."
— ABC News Interview

(On Bobby Fischer’s estrangement from competitive chess:) "After 1972, we lost so many great pieces of art. Hundreds of masterpieces he would have created if he had stayed a sane being. We feel the great loss. All chess players do."
— The New York Times Quote of the Day, 2012

(His final advice to students:) "Play as if the future of humanity depends on your efforts. It really does."
—Every Move Must Have A Purpose, Hyperion (2003)
