= Jordy Mont-Reynaud =

American chess player (born 1983)

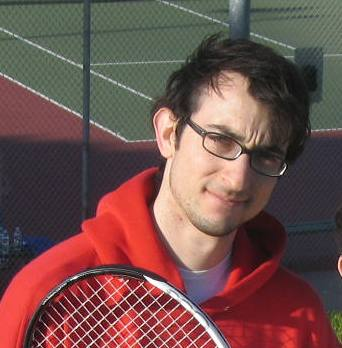

Personal information
- Born: August 16, 1983 (age 43) Stanford, California, U.S.

Chess career
- Country: United States
- Peak rating: 2285 (January 1995)

Jordy Mont-Reynaud (born August 16, 1983) is an American chess player. He became the youngest ever chess master in the United States when he became a master at the age of 10 years 209 days in 1994 (a record surpassed by Vinay Bhat, and presently held by Samuel Sevian). For his successful early career, he was asked to play the starring role of Josh Waitzkin in the 1993 movie Searching for Bobby Fischer, but declined the offer.

Mont-Reynaud attended Stanford University, where he played a leading role in Stanford's success at the Pan-American Intercollegiate Chess Tournaments of 2000–01 and 2001–02. As of June 2019, his USCF rating is 2273. He occasionally hosts chess events in San Francisco.

== Other ==
Mont-Reynaud has also been recognized for his talents in photography and programming. He is a former employee of Bebo, a social networking company in San Francisco. Currently, he is CEO of Dojo.com, a social-persuasive technology web service.

== Scholastic chess achievements ==
- 1992 California Primary School (K-3) State Champion (tied with Vinay Bhat)
- 1992 National Primary (K-3) Champion
- 1994 National K-8 Champion
- 1995 California Junior High School (K-8) State Champion
- 1999 United States Cadet (Under 16) Champion

== Notable game ==
Mont-Reynaud vs. Bacrot, Bratislava 1993

Position: e7 black bishop, c6 white queen, f6 black king, h6 black pawn, b5 white pawn, d3 black knight, f3 white pawn, g2 white pawn, h2 white pawn, g1 white king

Final position

Mont-Reynaud vs. Étienne Bacrot, World Under-10 Championship, Bratislava 1993
1.d4 d5 2.c4 e6 3.Nc3 c6 4.Nf3 dxc4 5.a4 Bb4 6.e4 b5 7.Bg5 Qb6 8.Be2 Bb7 9.0-0 a6 10.Qc2 Nd7 11.Rfd1 Ngf6 12.e5 Nd5 13.Ne4 h6 14.Bh4 0-0 15.Qc1 c5 16.Nf6+ N5xf6 17.exf6 cxd4 18.fxg7 Kxg7 19.Nxd4 Ne5 20.Qf4 Ng6 21.Qf6+ Kh7 22.Nf5 exf5 23.Qxb6 Rab8 24.Qd4 Rg8 25.f3 Rbc8 26.Qf6 Be7 27.Qxf7+ Rg7 28.Qxf5 Bxh4 29.Rd7 Rc7 30.Rxc7 Rxc7 31.axb5 Bc8 32.Qd5 axb5 33.Qxb5 Be6 34.Qb6 Re7 35.Ra7 Bf7 36.Rxe7 Bxe7 37.Qc7 Kg7 38.Bxc4 Be8 39.Qc8 Bf7 40.Bxf7 Kxf7 41.Qb7 Ne5 42.b4 Kf6 43.b5 Nd3 44.Qc6+ 1–0

Achievements
Preceded by Stuart Rachels	Youngest ever United States chessmaster 1994–1995	Succeeded by Vinay Bhat
