= Jeff Sarwer =

Canadian-Finnish chess player (born 1978)

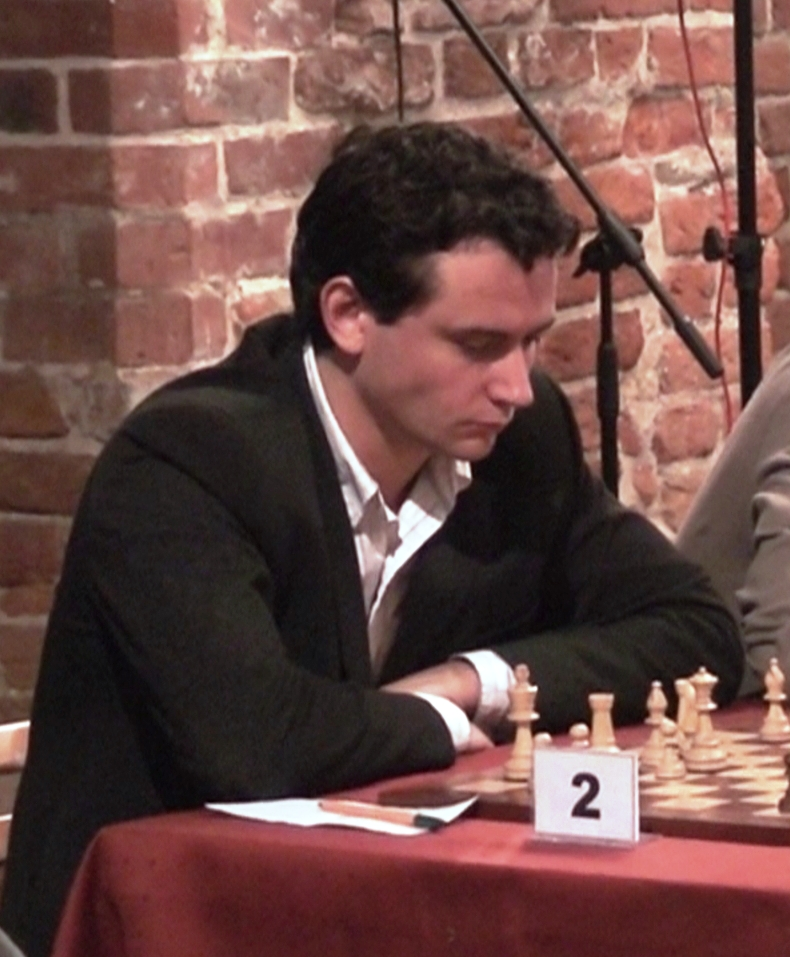
- Sarwer playing chess

Personal information
- Born: Jeffrey William Sarwer; 14 May 1978 (age 48) Kingston, Ontario, Canada

Chess career
- Country: Canada (until 2015); Finland (since 2015)
- Title: FIDE Master (2015)
- Peak rating: 2344 (July 2015)

Jeffrey William Sarwer (born 14 May 1978) is a Canadian-Finnish (dual citizenship) former child chess prodigy whose charismatic personality and chess talent made him a well-known media figure. His chess career and his family's unconventional lifestyle were the subjects of many articles and TV shows.

Sarwer's attacking playing style was often compared to that Bobby Fischer, and a tournament game drawn against him by another young chess player, Joshua Waitzkin, was the inspiration for the climax in the film Searching for Bobby Fischer.

Sarwer won the under-10 World Youth Chess Championship in Puerto Rico in 1986 representing Canada.

When Sarwer was 8, he was believed by many to be one of the strongest prodigies in the history of the game. Allen Kaufman, head of the American Chess Foundation, said, "Jeff at 9 is stronger than Bobby was at 11." Bruce Pandolfini said, "Of the several thousand kids I've taught, Jeff is certainly the most amazing young player I've ever seen."

== Early career ==
Born in Kingston, Ontario to a Finnish mother and a Canadian father, Sarwer learned the rules of chess at the age of 4 from his 6-year-old sister, Julia, and at age of 6 started to play at the Manhattan Chess Club, which was one of the most prestigious chess clubs in the world at the time. Bruce Pandolfini was the manager of the club, and being impressed with them gave him and his sister free life memberships, which were usually reserved for grandmasters.

Sarwer used to entertain large crowds by playing 40 people at the same time known as simultaneous chess, every Canada Day from the age of 7 on Parliament Hill in Ottawa. He also used to show up and play speed chess at Washington Square Park in New York City, where large numbers of people gathered to watch his games.

== Media life ==
At the age of 7, Sarwer 's enthusiasm for the game caught the attention of Grandmaster Edmar Mednis and he invited him to analyze the 1986 World Championship Match between Kasparov and Karpov on PBS. Sarwer and his sister Julia (who was also a world champion for girls under 10) continued to do this for the rematch in 1987 as well. After this Jeff and Julia became well known in media circles and appeared on various talk shows and were the subject of a documentary.

Magazines such as GQ and Sports Illustrated wrote articles about Sarwer and his family, often highlighting their bizarre lifestyle and questioning his safety and chess career under his father's care.

== Vanity Fair article ==
Jeff's father did not allow him to continue his chess career when it became apparent that he would not be able to keep full control over Jeff's life. He moved the family away from New York City and ran into trouble with The Children's Aid Society of Ontario. A featured article in Vanity Fair magazine by John Colapinto detailed child abuse of Jeff and Julia and prompted the C.A.S. to take him and his sister into protective custody.

Jeff and Julia ran away from the C.A.S. back to their father and hid out from authorities in order to not be taken away into custody again. The Sarwers lived in various countries and got used to living an anonymous lifestyle.

== Searching For Bobby Fischer ==
In 1993 the film Searching for Bobby Fischer was released and Sarwer's character was portrayed as "Jonathan Poe". In the film's final game, Poe declined the offer of a draw and eventually lost. In reality, Sarwer declined the draw offer by Josh Waitzkin, but the game ended in a draw (because of insufficient material) a few moves later. Under tournament tie-breaking rules, Waitzkin was determined to have played more challenging opponents during the overall competition and was awarded first place, but they were declared US Primary School co-champions. At the time that the game was played, Sarwer was seven and Waitzkin nine years old.

Sarwer vs. Waitzkin, 1986
1.d4 Nf6 2.c4 g6 3.Nc3 Bg7 4.e4 d6 5.f4 0-0 6.Nf3 Nbd7 7.e5 Ne8 8.Bd3 c5 9.dxc5 Nxc5 10.Bc2 a5 11.0-0 b6 12.Be3 Bb7 13.Qd4 dxe5 14.Nxe5 Qxd4 15.Bxd4 Rd8 16.Bxc5 bxc5 17.Na4 Bxe5 18.fxe5 Rd2 19.Rf2 Rxf2 20.Kxf2 f6 21.e6 Nd6 22.Nxc5 Rc8 23.Nxb7 Nxb7 24.b3 Nc5 25.Re1 Rc6 26.Be4 Ra6 27.Bc2 Rxe6 28.Rxe6 Nxe6 29.Ke3 Kf8 30.Ke4 Ke8 31.g3 Kd7 32.Kd5 f5 33.a3 h6 34.b4 axb4 35.axb4 Nc7+ 36.Kc5 e5 37.Ba4+ Kc8 38.Bc6 e4 39.b5 e3 40.Bf3 Ne6+ 41.Kd5 Ng5 42.Be2 Kc7 43.Ke5 Ne4 44.Kd4 Kd6 45.Kxe3 Kc5 46.g4 Nd6 47.Kf4 g5+ 48.Ke5 fxg4 49.Kf6 g3 50.hxg3 Ne4+ 51.Kg6 Nxg3 52.Bd3 Nh1 53.Kxh6 g4 54.Kg5 g3 55.Be4 Nf2 56.Bd5 Nd1 57.Kf4 Nc3 58.Bc6 Ne2+ 59.Kf3 Nd4+ 60.Kxg3 Nxc6 61.bxc6 Kxc6 62.Kf3 Kc5 63.Ke3 Kxc4 ½–½

== Resurfacing ==
After he disappeared at a very young age, many people thought Sarwer would not be seen playing chess again. In September 2007 he resurfaced to the chess scene, apparently without training and entered a 30-minute semi-rapid tournament at Malbork castle in Poland. He finished in third place with a score of 7/9 in a group of 86 players including four grandmasters. Since he had no active chess rating, he was given a provisional Elo rating of 2250 FIDE but seemed to perform above that level. In January 2010 Sarwer gave a long interview to Chess Life Online detailing his experiences from that tournament and talking about his current life in Europe. In August 2010, Sarwer was profiled in the Sunday Times Magazine talking about his father's methods, his chess career and his reappearance in public. Sarwer says that if he decided to make chess a priority, he would do so to become a grandmaster. "It would require at least two years of dedicated hardcore study and practice", he said, "especially in regards to opening preparation" for him to achieve that goal.

In summer 2015 Sarwer participated in VI Shakkinet tournament in Finland. Sarwer scored 5/9, which was enough for IM-norm.

== Poker ==
Since December 2008, Sarwer has been playing on the European Poker Tour. He has had two final table appearances and earned about $500,000. In February 2010, Bluff Europe magazine ran a featured article about him and his new poker career. He is represented by the player agency Poker Icons.

== Radio interview ==
Sarwer was the subject of BBC World Service's programme The Interview on 19 December 2010, in which he candidly recounted his life and his childhood experiences and his relationship with his abusive father. He also spoke of successful years in United States real estate in his 20s and his current success on the professional poker circuit in Europe in his 30s.
