= Lev Alburt =

American chess grandmaster (born 1945)

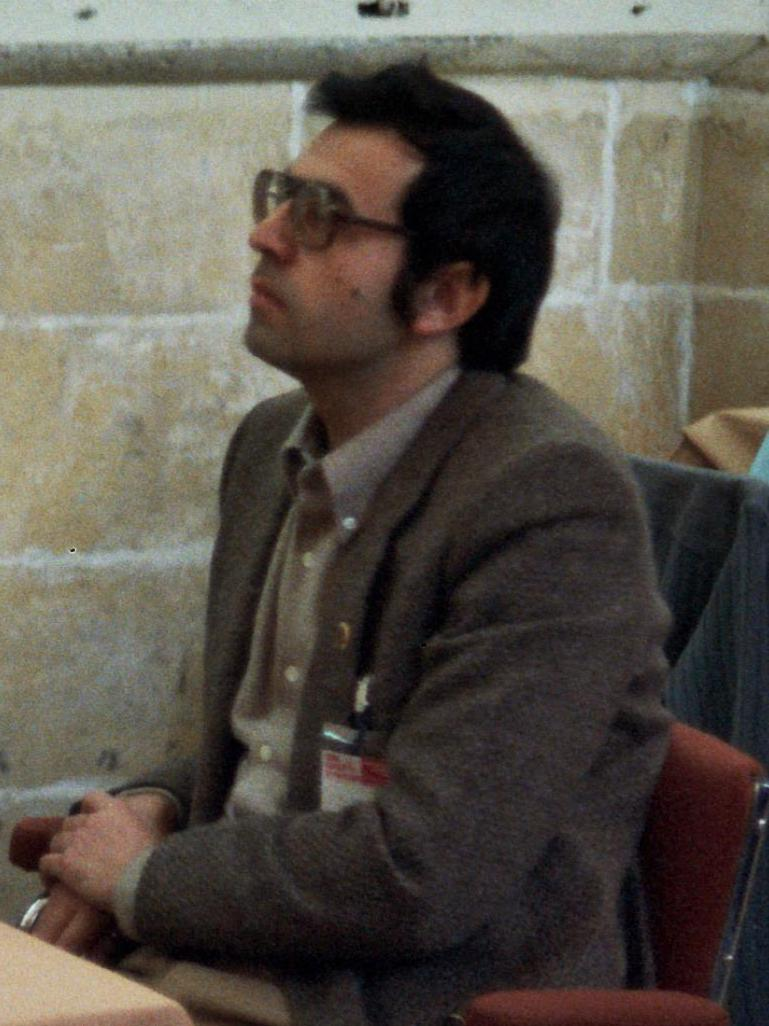
- Alburt in 1980

Personal information
- Born: Lev Osipovich Alburt; August 21, 1945 (age 81) Orenburg, Russian SFSR, Soviet Union

Chess career
- Country: Soviet Union (until 1979); United States (since 1979)
- Title: Grandmaster (1977)
- FIDE rating: 2539 (October 2026)
- Peak rating: 2580 (July 1981)
- Peak ranking: No. 22 (January 1981)

Lev Osipovich Alburt (born August 21, 1945) is an American chess grandmaster, writer and coach. He was born in Orenburg, Russia, and became three-time Ukrainian Champion. After defecting to the United States in 1979, he became three-time U.S. Champion.

== Chess career ==
Alburt won the Ukrainian Chess Championship in 1972, 1973 and 1974. He earned the International Master title in 1976, and Grandmaster title in 1977.

He defected to the United States in 1979, while on a chess team trip (European Champions' Cup) to Germany and upon his arrival to the U.S., staying for several months with his former coach and fellow Ukrainian chess player and chess journalist Michael Faynberg. In 1980, Alburt led the U.S. Chess Olympiad team at Malta.

Alburt won the U.S. Chess Championship in 1984, 1985 and 1990, and the U.S. Open Chess Championship in 1987 and 1989. In 1986, he drew an eight-game match with the British Chess Champion, Jonathan Speelman.

=== Related work ===
Alburt is the author of numerous best-selling chess books.

He served on the Board of Directors of the United States Chess Federation from 1985 to 1988. At the conclusion of his term, he stated that not once did he ever hear any discussion by the board of how to promote chess or bring new players into the game.

Alburt has worked as a chess coach for many years. In 2004, he was awarded the title of FIDE Senior Trainer. In New York City, where he lives, several Wall Street figures and other prominent people have taken chess classes from him, including Carl Icahn, Stephen Friedman, Doug Hirsch, Eliot Spitzer and Ted Field.

Alburt was the highest-rated American player on the January 1981 FIDE rating list.

== Books ==
- Alburt, with Eric Schiller (1985). The Alekhine for the Tournament Player. American Chess Promotions. ISBN 0-7134-1596-7.
- Alburt (1989). Test and improve your chess. Pergamon Press. ISBN 0-08-032041-4.
- Alburt, with Alexander Chernin (2001). Pirc Alert!. W W Norton & Co Inc. ISBN 978-1-889323-07-7.
- Alburt (2002). Building Up Your Chess: The Art of Accurate Evaluation and Other Winning Techniques. Newmarket Press. ISBN 978-1-889323-08-4.
- Alburt, with Nikolai Krogius (2005). Just the Facts!: Winning Endgame Knowledge in One Volume (second ed.). Chess Information and Research Center (distributed by W. W. Norton). ISBN 1-889323-15-2.
- Alburt, with Roman Dzindzichashvili and Eugene Perelshteyn (2006). Chess Openings for White, Explained. Chess Information and Research Center. ISBN 978-1-889323-11-4.
- Alburt, with Roman Dzindzichashvili and Eugene Perelshteyn (2009). Chess Openings for Black, Explained. Chess Information and Research Center. ISBN 978-1-889323-18-3.
- Alburt, with Jon Crumiller (2017). Carlsen vs. Karjakin World Chess Championship New York 2016. Chess Information and Research Center. ISBN 978-1-889323-29-9. This book won the 2018 Chess Journalists of America "Book of the Year" award.

== Legacy ==
The Alburt Variation in Alekhine's Defence is named after him: 1.e4 Nf6 2.e5 Nd5 3.d4 d6 4.Nf3 g6.

== Notable games ==
Hort vs. Alburt, 1977

Position: g1 white knight, a1 black rook, h2 white pawn, e2 white pawn, g3 white pawn, f4 white pawn, e4 white king, h5 black pawn, d5 black knight, g6 black pawn, e6 black bishop, d6 black pawn, f7 black pawn, e7 black pawn, g8 black king

Final position

In a 1977 tournament in Děčín, Czechoslovakia, Alburt defeated Vlastimil Hort, who was rated No. 6 in the world at the time, with the black pieces using the Benko Gambit:

Hort vs. Alburt, Děčín 1977
1.d4 Nf6 2.c4 c5 3.d5 b5 4.cxb5 a6 5.bxa6 g6 6.Nc3 Bxa6 7.Nf3 d6 8.g3 Bg7 9.Bg2 Nbd7 10.0-0 Nb6 11.Re1 0-0 12.Nd2 Qc7 13 Rb1 Qb7 14.b3 Nfxd5 15.Nxd5 Nxd5 16.Nf1 Nc3 17.Bxb7 Bxb7 18.Qd3 Be4 19.Qe3 Bd4 20.Qh6 Bxb1 21.a3 Ba2 22.Nd2 Rfb8 23.b4 cxb4 24.axb4 Rxb4 25.Nf3 Bg7 26.Qh3 Be6 27.Qf1 Bc4 28.Kg2 Ra1 29.Ng1 Rbb1 30.Kh3 h5 31.f4 Be6+ 32.Kg2 Nd5 33.Kf3 Bc3 34.Rd1 Bb2 35.Bxb2 Rxd1 36.Bxa1 Rxf1+ 37.Ke4 Rxa1 0–1
Seirawan vs. Alburt, 1990

Position: a2 black king, f3 white pawn, c3 white king, h4 white pawn, f4 white pawn, h5 black pawn, g5 white pawn, f5 black bishop, g6 black pawn, f7 black pawn

Final position

In the 1990 U.S. Championship en route to winning the championship a third time, Alburt defeated four-time U.S. champion Yasser Seirawan with the black pieces:

Seirawan vs. Alburt, Jacksonville 1990
1.d4 Nf6 2.Nf3 c5 3.c3 d5 4.Bf4 e6 5.e3 Bd6 6.Bb5+ Nc6 7.Qa4 Bxf4 8.exf4 Qb6 9.Nbd2 0-0 10.dxc5 Qxc5 11.0-0 Bd7 12.Bxc6 bxc6 13.Qd4 Qe7 14.b4 c5 15.bxc5 Rfc8 16.Nb3 a5 17.Rfc1 a4 18.Nbd2 Qxc5 19.c4 Rab8 20.Qxc5 Rxc5 21.Ne5 Rcc8 22.Rab1 Kf8 23.a3 Ke7 24.g3 Rxb1 25.Rxb1 Rc7 26.Kf1 Be8 27.Ke1 h5 28.f3 Nd7 29.Nxd7 Bxd7 30.Rb4 Kd6 31.Kf2 Kc5 32.Ke3 Bc6 33.h4 Rd7 34.g4 Rd8 35.g5 Rd7 36.Ke2 Rb7 37.Rxb7 Bxb7 38.cxd5 exd5 39.Ke3 Bc8 40.Kd3 Bf5+ 41.Ke3 g6 42.Nf1 Kc4 43.Ng3 d4+ 44.Kd2 Kb3 45.Ne2 Kxa3 46.Nxd4 Kb2 47.Nb5 a3 48.Nxa3 Kxa3 49.Kc3 Ka2 0–1

Preceded by Walter Browne, Larry Christiansen, and Roman Dzindzichashvili	United States Chess Champion; 1984–1985	Succeeded by Yasser Seirawan
Preceded by Roman Dzindzichashvili, Yasser Seirawan, and Stuart Rachels	United States Chess Champion; 1990	Succeeded by Gata Kamsky
