= The Elements of Moral Philosophy =

Ethics textbook

- Cover of the first edition
- Author: James Rachels
- Language: English
- Subject: Ethics
- Published: 1986 (McGraw-Hill, 1st edition); 1993 (2nd edition); 1999 (3rd edition); 2003 (4th edition); 2007 (5th edition); 2009 (6th edition); 2011 (7th edition); 2014 (8th edition); 2018 (9th edition); 2023 (10th edition)
- Publication place: United States
- Media type: Print (Hardcover and Paperback)
- ISBN: 0-07-282574-X
- OCLC: 173081152

The Elements of Moral Philosophy is a 1986 ethics textbook by the philosophers James Rachels and Stuart Rachels. It explains a number of moral theories and topics, including cultural relativism, subjectivism, divine command theory, ethical egoism, social contract theory, utilitarianism, Kantian ethics, and deontology. The book uses real-life examples in explaining the theories.

The author considers some problems such as relativism and moral subjectivism, religion and its relations with morality, the ethical and psychological selfishness of people, at the same time that he shows us some very important normative theories, such as Kantianism, utilitarianism, ethics of virtue, feminist ethics, and contractualist theories. The book is not intended to give a clear and unified theory about the "truth" of all of the analyzed topics, but does make some judgements about them through rational argument.

== Topics ==
=== The moral ===
The book tells us that morality refers to, at the very least, the effort to guide our behavior for reasons. This refers to doing something for which there are better reasons while giving equal weight to the interests of each person who will be affected by what we do. It also gives us a clear picture of what it means to be morally responsible. He is someone who looks out impartially for the interests of everyone who is affected by his actions, someone who carefully distinguishes facts and evaluates their implications, someone who accepts principles of conduct after carefully analyzing them to be sure that are concrete, be willing to listen to reason even when it means for him to have to review his own previous convictions and finally be willing to act on the consequences of his consideration.

=== Ethical Egoism ===
Within the chapter of ethical egoism, it is discussed how people act in or carry out their activities in a disinterested way. Many people in the day to day carry out actions in which they help and benefit each other. Community work, donations, foundations and social service work are many examples of people who act in a disinterested way always thinking of helping their neighbor, however in this chapter a theory of human nature called "psychological selfishness" is mentioned in which tells us that no one is capable of acting disinterestedly since the aforementioned is an illusion and all people act always thinking in themselves.

=== Does Morality depend on religion? ===
The discussion between whether there is a connection between morality and religion and its influence within it are topics that this chapter addresses. People's assumptions tend to see religious entities as moral representatives and take them as good moral advisers but it is because it is viewed from a non-religious perspective in which the world without religion is a cold and meaningless place for many people.

== Editions ==
James Rachels wrote the first edition in 1986. He revised the book three times, adding a chapter on "The Ethics of Virtue" in 1993 and a chapter on "Feminism and the Ethics of Care" in 1999. The fourth edition appeared in 2003, the year Rachels died. Since then, his son Stuart has written the fifth edition and the sixth edition, which was released in April 2009. An eighth edition was released in October 2014, a ninth in May 2018 and a tenth in 2023. The book has been translated into Italian, Portuguese, Chinese, Indonesian, Korean, Spanish, Norwegian, Swedish, Persian and Albanian. It is known for its accessibility to a wide readership.
