= James Rachels =

American philosopher & ethicist (1941–2003)

- Born: James Webster Rachels; 30 May 1941; Columbus, Georgia, U.S.
- Died: 5 September 2003 (aged 62); Birmingham, Alabama, U.S.

Education
- Education: Mercer University, University of North Carolina at Chapel Hill

Philosophical work
- Era: Contemporary philosophy
- Region: Western philosophy
- School: Analytic philosophy
- Main interests: Ethics, bioethics, animal rights

James Webster Rachels (May 30, 1941 – September 5, 2003) was an American philosopher who specialized in ethics and animal rights.

== Biography ==
Rachels was born in Columbus, Georgia, and graduated from Mercer University in 1962. He received his Ph.D. in 1967 from the University of North Carolina at Chapel Hill, studying under W. D. Falk and E. M. Adams. He taught at the University of Richmond, New York University, the University of Miami, Duke University and the University of Alabama at Birmingham, where he spent the last twenty-six years of his career. He married Carol Williams in 1962, and they had two sons, David and Stuart.

As a teenager, he won a national speech contest that enabled him to appear on American Bandstand and to meet John F. Kennedy and Richard M. Nixon. He taught chess to his 9-year-old son, Stuart, who became the youngest chess master in American history at age 11.

At the University of Alabama at Birmingham, Rachels started in 1977 as Chair of Philosophy, became Dean of Arts and Humanities from 1978–1983, and then one year as Acting Vice-president for University College. After retiring from administration at UAB, he was named University Professor and in 1992, the second Ireland Scholar.

Over the course of his career, Rachels wrote 6 books and 85 essays, edited 7 books, and gave some 275 professional lectures. He argued for moral vegetarianism and animal rights, affirmative action, euthanasia, and the idea that parents should give as much fundamental moral consideration to another's children as they do to their own. Later in his career, Rachels realized that a lifetime of analysing specific moral issues had led him to adopt the general ethic of utilitarianism, according to which actions are assessed by their effects on both human and nonhuman happiness.

Rachels died from cancer on 5 September 2003, in Birmingham, Alabama.

== Works ==
Rachels' best-known work is The Elements of Moral Philosophy. It went to its sixth edition in 2009, having been revised by Rachels' son, Stuart Rachels. Among the subjects covered are ethical and simple subjectivism, emotivism, as well as ethical and psychological egoism. The text uses real-world examples to highlight points regarding complicated philosophical principles. Rachels had a history of using such examples. The publication in 1971 of his anthology, Moral Problems, marked a shift from teaching meta-ethics in American colleges to teaching concrete practical issues. Moral Problems sold 100,000 copies over three editions.

In 1975, Rachels wrote "Active and Passive Euthanasia", which originally appeared in the New England Journal of Medicine, and argued that the distinction so important in the law between killing and letting die (often based on the principle of double effect) has no rational basis. He argued that, if we allow passive euthanasia, we should also allow active euthanasia, because it is more humane, and because there is no significant moral difference between killing and allowing to die. The End of Life (1986), a moral treatise on life and death, broadened and deepened these ideas.

Rachels wrote only a few works that were not directly focused on ethics. Created from Animals (1990) made the case that a Darwinian world-view has widespread philosophical implications, including drastic implications for our treatment of nonhuman entities. Can Ethics Provide Answers? (1997) was Rachels's first collection of papers. His second, The Legacy of Socrates, was published posthumously in 2007. Shortly before his death, he wrote Problems from Philosophy (2005), an introduction to philosophy.

== Vegetarianism ==
Rachels authored papers defending moral vegetarianism. His best known paper on the subject was The Basic Argument for Vegetarianism in 2004. Rachels proposed what he called the basic argument for vegetarianism which he believed is supported by a simple principle that every decent person accepts: it is wrong to cause pain unless there is a good enough reason.

Rachels argued that the primary reason why cruelty to animals is wrong is because tortured animals suffer, just as tortured humans suffer. He held the view that inflicting pain on animals can sometimes be justified but we must have a sufficiently good reason for doing so. The idea to consume meat just because it tastes good does not come close to justifying the cruelty of the meat industry.

Rachels stated that "from a practical standpoint, it makes sense to focus first on the things that cause the most misery". At the top of this list was factory farming. According to Rachels' basic argument, abstention from factory-farmed animals is necessary as these animals suffer the most.

== Bibliography ==
- with Stuart Rachels (2008). The Truth About the World : Basic Readings in Philosophy. Boston: McGraw-Hill Higher Education. ISBN 978-0-07-338661-4.
- with Stuart Rachels (2006). The Legacy of Socrates: Essays in Moral Philosophy. Columbia University Press. ISBN 0-231-13844-X.
- (2005). Problems from Philosophy. Boston: McGraw-Hill Higher Education.
- (2004). The Basic Argument for Vegetarianism. In Sapontzis (ed.) Food for Thought: The Debate over Eating Meat. Prometheus Books. pp. 70–80.
- (2004). A Moral Defense of Vegetarianism. In Christina Hoff Sommers, Frederic Tamler Sommers. Vice & Virtue in Everyday Life: Introductory Readings in Ethics. Wadsworth. pp. 591–595.
- (1998). Ethical Theory: Theories About how we Should Live. Oxford University Press. ISBN 978-0-19-875186-1.
- (1997). Can Ethics Provide Answers?: And Other Essays in Moral Philosophy. Rowman & Littlefield Pub Inc. ISBN 0-8476-8347-8.
- (1990). Created From Animals: The Moral implications of Darwinism. Oxford University Press. ISBN 0-19-217775-3.
- (1989). The Right Thing to Do: Basic Readings in Moral Philosophy. Random House. ISBN 0-07-340740-2.
- (1986). The End of Life: Euthanasia and Morality. Oxford University Press. ISBN 0-19-286070-4.
- (1986). The Elements of Moral Philosophy. New York: Random House. ISBN 0-07-803824-3.

== See also ==
- American philosophy
- Anti-speciesism
- List of American philosophers
- List of animal rights advocates
