= Searching for Bobby Fischer =

1993 film by Steven Zaillian

- Theatrical release poster
- Directed by: Steven Zaillian
- Screenplay by: Steven Zaillian
- Based on: Searching for Bobby Fischer: The Father of a Prodigy Observes the World of Chess by Fred Waitzkin
- Produced by: Scott Rudin; William Horberg
- Starring: Joe Mantegna; Laurence Fishburne; Joan Allen; Max Pomeranc; Ben Kingsley
- Cinematography: Conrad L. Hall
- Edited by: Wayne Wahrman
- Music by: James Horner
- Distributed by: Paramount Pictures
- Release date: August 11, 1993
- Running time: 109 minutes
- Country: United States
- Language: English
- Budget: $12 million
- Box office: $7,266,383

Searching for Bobby Fischer, released in the United Kingdom as Innocent Moves, is a 1993 American drama film written and directed by Steven Zaillian in his directorial debut. Starring Max Pomeranc in his film debut, Joe Mantegna, Joan Allen, Ben Kingsley, and Laurence Fishburne, it is based on the life of prodigy chess player Joshua Waitzkin, played by Pomeranc, and adapted from the book of the same name by Joshua's father, Fred Waitzkin. Searching for Bobby Fischer was released by Paramount Pictures on August 11, 1993. The film received positive reviews from critics and underperformed at the box office, grossing $7,266,383 against a $12 million budget. The film was nominated for Best Cinematography in the 66th Academy Awards.

== Plot ==
Seven-year-old Josh Waitzkin becomes fascinated with the chess players in New York City's Washington Square Park. His mother, Bonnie, is initially uncomfortable with his interest, as the games in the park are rife with illegal gambling and homeless players, but eventually allows Josh to play a game with a disheveled player (who charges $5 to play the game). Although Josh loses, Bonnie is amazed that he understands the rules of chess, despite having never been taught them. Another park player, Vinnie Livermore, alerts Bonnie to Josh's advanced talent in the game.

Josh's father, Fred, asks to play a game with his son and swiftly defeats him. It emerges, however, that Josh deliberately lost to spare his father's feelings. When Fred prompts Josh to play a rematch honestly, Josh effortlessly defeats him.

A friendship blooms between Josh and Vinnie, who becomes a mentor. Fred requests the services of Bruce Pandolfini as a formal chess tutor for his son. Bruce takes an immediate liking to Josh, but disapproves of many of Josh's maverick tactics, adopted from Vinnie's tutelage. In particular, Bruce disapproves of Josh's tendency to bring out his queen too early, and warns Fred that such careless tactics will weaken Josh's performance in organized chess tournaments.

Against Bruce's advice, Fred enrolls Josh in a chess tournament. Josh wins, the first in a slew of tournament victories for him. Fred develops an unhealthy obsession with Josh's chess career, causing friction between Fred, Bonnie, and Josh's school teacher. Josh, upset by the changes he has noticed in his father, begins losing tournaments.

As a remedy, Fred dedicates Josh entirely to Bruce's teaching regimen, and at Bruce's request, Josh is forbidden from playing any more games with Vinnie. Bruce's relationship with Josh grows cold and misanthropic as Bruce seeks to harden Josh's competitiveness. When Bruce berates Josh by showering him in "meaningless Xeroxes" of a certificate that Bruce had previously told Josh was a special award, Bonnie kicks Bruce out of the house.

Fred and Josh reconcile, with Fred assuring Josh that he loves his son, even if he is not a chess champion. And when Josh is allowed to resume playing chess with Vinnie, his enthusiasm for the game returns.

Josh attends the National Chess Championship, where he and Bruce reconcile. In the final tournament game, Josh is paired against Jonathan Poe, another young prodigy whose talent has intimidated Josh. The game is a back-and-forth struggle: Josh's use of Vinnie's reckless tactics causes him to lose his queen early in the game, but he follows up with more tactics to win Jonathan's queen. The game continues into a complex endgame. After an overconfident move from Jonathan, Josh remembers Bruce's disciplined teachings, and uses them to calculate a path to an assured victory. Before executing the sequence, he offers his opponent a draw. Jonathan, insulted, and not realizing his own predicament, refuses. Josh plays out a winning combination and wins the game.

== Cast ==
- Max Pomeranc as Josh Waitzkin
- Ben Kingsley as Bruce Pandolfini
- Joe Mantegna as Fred Waitzkin, Josh's father
- Laurence Fishburne as "Vinnie" Vincent Livermore
- Joan Allen as Bonnie Waitzkin, Josh's mother
- Robert Stephens as Jonathan's teacher
- David Paymer as Kalev
- William H. Macy as Tunafish father
- Austin Pendleton as Asa Hoffmann
- Tony Shalhoub as Chess club player
- Josh Mostel as Chess club regular
- Dan Hedaya as Tournament director
- Laura Linney as Josh's school teacher
- Anthony Heald as Fighting parent
- Michael Nirenberg as Jonathan Poe
- Hal Scardino as Morgan Pehme
- Vasek Simek as Russian player

Some famous chess players have cameos in the film: Anjelina Belakovskaia, Joel Benjamin, Roman Dzindzichashvili, Kamran Shirazi, along with the real Joshua Waitzkin, Bruce Pandolfini, Vincent Livermore, and Russell Garber. Chess master Asa Hoffmann is played by Austin Pendleton; the real Hoffmann was disappointed with his portrayal by Pendleton. Chess expert Poe McClinton, still a park regular, is seen throughout the film. Pal Benko was supposed to be in the film but his part was cut out. Waitzkin's real mother and sister also have cameos. Bobby Fischer appears in newsreel footage.

The Russian player in the park (played by Vasek Simek) who holds up the sign "Game or Photograf Of Man Who Beet [sic] Tal 1953 • Five Dollars", was based on the real life of Israel Zilber, who would regularly sleep in the park, awakening only for a "five dollar game" that he would demand in a Russian accent (reduced to "two dollar game" during slow times if requested) and which he would invariably win. Zilber also played the Queen's Gambit as White. Zilber, Latvian Chess Champion in 1958, defeated the teenage Mikhail Tal in 1952, and during most of the 1980s was homeless and regarded as one of the top players in Washington Square Park.

Waitzkin's main chess foil character in the film, Jonathan Poe (played by Michael Nirenberg), is based on chess prodigy Jeff Sarwer. When Sarwer was asked what he felt about his portrayal in the film, he stated:

At the end of the day it was a Hollywood film, a work of fiction, and it helped popularize chess more so that's always a good thing. But I have a lot of distance to the actual book and film, the way I was portrayed was nothing at all like how I was in real life so what's the point in comparing myself to it?

== Sarwer versus Waitzkin match ==
At the end of the film in the final tournament, Josh is seen playing opponent Jonathan Poe. In actual life, Josh's opponent was Jeff Sarwer, who was younger. In September 1985, Josh first played and was defeated by Jeff at the Manhattan Chess Club. In November of the same year, Josh returned to the Manhattan Chess Club and beat him in a rematch. The film depicts their third match in the 1986 US Primary Championship. Near the end of the game, where Josh offers Poe a draw, Poe rejects the offer, the play continues and Poe loses. Sarwer rejected the draw offer in the real-world game as well, but the play continued to a draw due to bare kings. Under tournament tie-breaking rules, Waitzkin was determined to have played more challenging opponents during the overall competition and was awarded first place, but they were declared US Primary School co-champions. Sarwer went on to win the 1986 World Championship Under-10 (Boys), with his sister Julia winning the World Championship Under-10 (Girls).

=== Poe versus Waitzkin endgame ===
"Poe vs. Waitzkin"

Position: c8 black rook, d8 black bishop, a7 black pawn, g7 black pawn, b6 black knight, e6 white king, f6 white pawn, e5 white rook, g5 white bishop, e4 white knight, h4 white pawn, c2 black king

Black (Waitzkin) to move

The diagram depicts the game position in the film, with Waitzkin playing the black pieces, before Waitzkin offers Poe the draw. This position did not occur in the real Sarwer–Waitzkin game; it was contrived by Waitzkin and Pandolfini for the film. The following moves are executed:

1... gxf6 2. Bxf6 Rc6+ 3. Kf5 Rxf6+?? 4. Nxf6 Bxf6 5. Kxf6?? Nd7+ 6. Kf5 Nxe5 7. Kxe5??

In the October 1995 issue of Chess Life, Grandmaster Larry Evans stated that the position and sequence were unsound: Poe (playing White) could still have drawn the game by playing 7.h5 instead. Furthermore, though not mentioned in the issue:

(i) The rook exchange 3...Rxf6+ is not a brilliancy but instead loses; 3... Nc4., 3...Nd7 and 3...Bxf6 hold the draw.

(ii) the modern Lomonosov 7-piece endgame tablebase shows White has a win after 4...Bxf6 with 5.Re2+, sacrificing White's rook for Black's bishop, and queening safely.

7... a5 8. h5 a4 9. h6 a3 10. h7 a2 11. h8=Q a1=Q+ 12. Kf5 Qxh8 0–1

White resigned.

=== Alternate endgame ===
An alternate endgame position had been composed by Pal Benko. It was to have been used in the film, but was rejected the day before the scene was filmed because it did not use the theme that Josh had rashly overused his queen.

Position: f5 black pawn, f4 white pawn, c3 black knight, h3 black king, h2 white bishop, h1 white king

Black to move

In this position, Black should play:

1... Ne2

after which White is in zugzwang; he must play either 2.Bg3, losing the bishop to 2...Nxg3+, or 2.Bg1, allowing 2...Ng3#.

== Development ==
In 1972, American chess champion Bobby Fischer traveled to Reykjavík, Iceland, for a match in the World Chess Championship 1972 with Boris Spassky. Fred Waitzkin was smitten by the game as he was swept up in the nationwide excitement at the time, and inspired by Fischer's charisma, began to study the strategy of chess. He realized he lacked the necessary talent to be a champion and left off, but his interest was revived a decade later when his son showed interest and talent.

== Reception ==
Both the film and book received positive reviews from critics. Waitzkin's book was praised by grandmaster Nigel Short, and journalist Edward Winter, who called it "a delightful book" in which "the topics [are] treated with an acuity and grace that offer the reviewer something quotable on almost every page." Screenwriter and playwright Tom Stoppard called the book "well written" and "captivating".

The film has a 98% rating on Rotten Tomatoes based on 45 reviews, with an average rating of 8.00/10. The site's consensus reads: "As sensitive as the young man at its center, Searching for Bobby Fischer uses a prodigy's struggle to find personal balance as the background for a powerfully moving drama." On Metacritic the film has a score of 89 based on reviews from 23 critics, indicating "universal acclaim". Audiences surveyed by CinemaScore graded the film "A" on scale of A to F.

Roger Ebert gave the film a score of four stars (out of four), calling it "a film of remarkable sensitivity and insight", adding, "by the end of [the film], we have learned […] a great deal about human nature." James Berardinelli gave the film three stars (out of four), calling it "an intensely fascinating movie capable of involving those who are ignorant about chess as well as those who love it."

Bobby Fischer himself never saw the film and claimed that it violated his privacy by using his name without his permission. Fischer never received any compensation from the film, calling it "a monumental swindle".

The film was nominated for Best Cinematography (Conrad L. Hall) at the 66th Academy Awards for 1993 but lost to Janusz Kaminski who won for Schindler's List, which was also written by Steven Zaillian. It won the category at the American Society of Cinematographers the same year. The film also ranked No. 96 in AFI's 100 Years... 100 Cheers.
