= K. K. Karanja =

American chess player (born 1973)

Kangugi wa Karanja
Personal information
- Born: Kangugi wa Karanja; November 23, 1973 (age 52) New York, U.S.

Chess career
- Country: United States / Kenya
- Title: USCF National Master

Kangugi "K. K." Karanja (born November 23, 1973) is an American chess player and former chess prodigy. He became a US Chess Federation Candidate Master at the age of 10.

== Career ==
=== Championships and awards ===
In 1985 at the age of 11, he won the National Elementary Chess Championship with a perfect 7–0 score (seven wins and no losses), becoming the first African-American to win a national scholastic title and the second African-American to win a national chess championship (Frank Street Jr. was the first, winning the 1965 US Amateur Championship).

In 1985, Karanja also received the Laura Aspis Prize, granted annually to the top USCF-rated player under the age of 13. Karanja qualified as the United States representative for the 1986 World Under-14 Chess Championship in San Juan, Puerto Rico.

In 1987, Karanja was selected to the inaugural All-America Chess Team, which recognizes the top 0.1-0.2 percent of chess players age 18 years and younger. Karanja also qualified for the 1987 U.S. Cadet Championship where only the top eight players under age 16 are invited to compete.

=== Other events and achievements ===
In 1988, Karanja was selected to participate in a simultaneous exhibition held by Grandmaster and World Champion Garry Kasparov in New York, during Kasparov's first visit to America. Of the 59 players to compete against Kasparov, only Karanja and fellow prodigy Josh Waitzkin held Kasparov to draws (the other 57 players lost).

In 1989, at the age of 15 years and 7 months, Karanja became a chess master, becoming the second youngest African-American at the time to achieve that feat behind Howard Daniels (15 years, 4 months). He subsequently attended Carleton College.

A sample of Karanja's ability is evidenced in the following game from the 1987 United States Cadet Chess Championship.

=== Retirement ===
Karanja retired from tournament play in 1990 with a rating of 2193. Karanja has written one book on chess and while living in Kenya was active in promoting chess.
