= Lone Pine International =

Series of chess tournaments in California, US from 1971 to 1981

Lone Pine International was a series of chess tournaments held annually in March or April from 1971 through 1981 in Lone Pine, California. The tournaments were formally known as the Louis D. Statham Masters, named after sponsor Louis D. Statham (1907–1983), an engineer and millionaire inventor of medical instruments who was also a Los Angeles-based chess aficionado. The events were seven- to ten-round Swiss system tournaments, with entrance requirements that made them the strongest recurring Swiss tournaments in the U.S. in the 1980s. Grandmaster Isaac Kashdan served as the tournament director.

== Summary ==
Year	Dates	Rounds	Field	Avg. Elo	Top score	Winners
1971	March 14–20	7	33	2190	6	Larry Evans (United States)
1972	March 12–18	7	35	2262	6	Svetozar Gligorić (Yugoslavia)
1973	March 18–24	7	48	2322	6	Arthur Bisguier (United States)
1974	March 24–30	7	53	2310	6	Walter Browne (United States)
1975	April 13–24	10	44	2428	7½	Vladimir Liberzon (Israel)
1976	March 7–13	7	57	2371	5½	Tigran Petrosian (Soviet Union)
1977	March 20–30	9	48	2410	6½	Yuri Balashov (Soviet Union); Dragutin Sahović (Yugoslavia); Oscar Panno (Argentina); Nona Gaprindashvili (Soviet Union)
1978	April 1–12	9	68	2431	7½	Bent Larsen (Denmark)
1979	March 25–April 4	9	73	2444	6½	Svetozar Gligorić (Yugoslavia); Florin Gheorghiu (Romania); Vladimir Liberzon (Israel); Vlastimil Hort (Czechoslovakia)
1980	March 16–26	9	43	2487	7	Roman Dzindzichashvili (Israel)
1981	March 29–April 8	9	61	2447	7	Viktor Korchnoi (Switzerland)

== Tournaments ==
=== 1971 ===
The first Louis D. Statham tournament was open to all USCF masters (rated 2200+) and Experts (rated 2000–2199). The field of 33 had an average Elo rating of 2190. Grandmaster Larry Evans (USA) won the $1000 first prize in the seven-round event with the score 6–1. Second place was a four-way tie among Svetozar Gligorić (Yugoslavia), James Tarjan (USA), William Martz (USA), and Walter Browne (USA) with 5 points each.

=== 1972 ===
For the second year of the tournament, eligibility requirements were increased slightly. Expert rating was required for juniors (under age twenty-one); adults needed to be masters. The field of 35 had an average rating of 2262. GM Svetozar Gligorić (Yugoslavia) won the $2000 first prize in the seven-round event with the score 6–1. Second place was a four-way tie at 5–2 among James Tarjan, Anthony Saidy, Andrew Karklins, and Paul Brandts (all USA).

=== 1973 ===
The third year of the tournament, masters were allowed as well as any juniors with a rating over 2100. The field grew to 48, with an average rating of 2322. GM Arthur Bisguier (USA) won with the score 6–1. Second–third places with 5½–1½ were Walter Browne (USA) and László Szabó (Hungary). Next at 5–2 were Edward Formanek (USA), John Grefe (USA), and Tony Miles (England).

=== 1974 ===
In the fourth tournament, for the first time an Expert rating was not sufficient for entrance, even for juniors. Also for the first time some masters were also excluded, as any player who was not a junior required a rating of 2250 or more or the FIDE International Master or Grandmaster title to qualify. Despite the more stringent entrance requirements the field grew again to 53, with an average rating of 2310. Walter Browne (USA and Australia) won with a score of 6–1, the first time the highest rated entrant (2612) was the victor. Tied for second with 5½ points were Pal Benko and John Grefe, and next with 5 points were Larry Evans, Julio Kaplan, Kim Commons, and Andrew Karklins (all USA).

=== 1975 ===
In 1975 the eligibility requirements were increased again. Entrants needed an IM or GM title or a rating of 2350 or higher (2250 for juniors) to qualify. The field shrank slightly to 44, but included 22 GMs and the average rating increased to 2428. The tournament was lengthened to ten rounds, which allowed it for the first time to be rated by FIDE. (Previous tournaments had been USCF rated only.) This made FIDE titles and norms available for the first time. In order to enhance title and norm chances for the participants, some flexibility was introduced into the Swiss system pairings in the later rounds. These adjustments led to some controversy, as a last-round pairing was disputed. Norman Weinstein (USA) earned a GM norm, and Kim Commons (USA) and Alla Kushnir (Israel) earned IM norms. Kushnir was the first woman to compete at Lone Pine and defeated GM Larry Evans in the first round. Vladimir Liberzon of Israel won the $4000 first prize with the score 7½–2½. Evans (USA) placed second at 7–3, and there was a six-way tie at 6½–3½ for positions three through eight among Walter Browne (USA), Florin Gheorghiu (Romania), Weinstein, Oscar Panno (Argentina), Miguel Quinteros (Argentina), and Svetozar Gligorić (Yugoslavia).

=== 1976 ===
In 1976 the eligibility requirements were made slightly less strict, with the required rating for adult masters lowered to 2300. The field increased to 57, including 11 GMs and 10 IMs, but the average rating dropped to 2371. The event was returned to the seven-round length, and as a result was expected to be rated only by the USCF as it did not meet FIDE requirements for Swiss system tournaments. In a controversial decision, FIDE made an exception to rate the tournament anyway. Subsequent Lone Pine tournaments would be nine-round events and thus meet FIDE requirements for rated Swiss tournaments. Former World Champion Tigran Petrosian (USSR) won the $8000 first prize, with a 5½–1½ score, the lowest winning seven-round score in Lone Pine history. Second place at 5–2 was shared by Larry Christiansen (USA), Vasily Smyslov (USSR), Oscar Panno (Argentina), Miguel Najdorf (Argentina), Miguel Quinteros (Argentina), Tony Miles (England), Ken Rogoff (USA), Győző Forintos (Hungary), and Walter Browne (USA). No FIDE norms were available at this tournament due to its seven-round length.

=== 1977 ===
The 1977 tournament had a number of firsts. For the first time, there was no clear winner. Also for the first time, a woman shared the top of the score card. The increase in the number of entrants in 1976 required that the qualification standards be increased in 1977, so the requirements were returned to those of 1975. The field of 48 had an average rating of 2410. Nona Gaprindashvili (USSR) tied for first with Yuri Balashov (USSR), Oscar Panno (Argentina), and Dragutin Sahović (Yugoslavia), with the score 6½–2½. Nona's performance at Lone Pine made her the first woman ever to earn a norm for the title of Grandmaster. This was the first elite tournament victory by a woman. Fifth and sixth place at 6–3 was shared by William Lombardy and Larry Christiansen (both USA).

=== 1978 ===
The 1978 tournament retained the same entrance requirements and tournament format as 1977. The field of 68 was a record, with a greater number of international participants and an average rating of 2431. GM Bent Larsen (Denmark) won with 7½–1½, the best score ever in a 9-round Lone Pine tournament. The larger number of international participants made norm opportunities more plentiful than before, and the eleven norms achieved set a record for an individually paired Swiss or round-robin tournament. (The Olympiads are paired by team rather than individual.) GM norms were earned by Jack Peters, Vitaly Zaltsman, Ken Rogoff (all USA), and Peter Biyiasas (Canada). IM norms were earned by Yasser Seirawan and Tim Taylor (both USA), Jaime Sunye Neto (Brazil), Jon Speelman (England), Haukur Angantýsson, Margeir Pétursson and Helgi Ólafsson (all Iceland).

=== 1979 ===
Requirements were tightened in 1979, with an IM or GM title, USCF senior master (rating 2400+), or junior rated over 2300 required for entrance. The field grew to a new record of 73 including players from 18 countries, and 27 GMs and 22 IMs. The average rating was 2444. Again there was no clear winner, with four players tying for the top score. Svetozar Gligorić and Vladimir Liberzon became the first repeat winners, joined by Vlastimil Hort (Czechoslovakia) and Florin Gheorghiu (Romania) with the score 6½–2½. The newly created FIDE Master (FM) title was available for the first time. Yasser Seirawan (USA) earned a GM norm; Walter Morris (USA), Jack Peters (USA), Joe Bradford (USA), Nick de Firmian (USA) and Paul van der Sterren (the Netherlands), earned IM norms; and Doug Root (USA) and David Strauss (USA) earned FM norms.

=== 1980 ===
In 1980, an International Master title was no longer sufficient for entry. Eligibility requirements were increased to Grandmaster, adults rated over 2450, and juniors rated over 2350. The average rating of the field of 43 jumped to 2487. Roman Dzindzichashvili (Israel) won with the score 7–2. Dzindzichashvili had emigrated from Israel to the U.S. the year before and would subsequently become a U.S. citizen. Michael Wilder, Jay Whitehead, Doug Root, and Ron Henley (all USA) earned IM norms; Joel Benjamin (USA) earned an FM norm.

=== 1981 ===
The final Lone Pine tournament was held in 1981. GM Viktor Korchnoi topped a field of 61 with the score 7–2 to win the $15,000 first prize. Three grandmasters tied for second with 6½–2½: Yasser Seirawan (USA), Gennadi Sosonko (Netherlands), and Svetozar Gligorić (Yugoslavia). The tournament included two Soviet grandmasters, Artur Yusupov and Oleg Romanishin, making it the first tournament aside from the Olympiads since Korchnoi's 1976 defection from the Soviet Union in which a Soviet player competed with him. No U.S. players earned title norms at this tournament.

The 1982 Canadian documentary The Great Chess Movie included footage from the 1981 tournament throughout the movie.
