= Fred Waitzkin =

American novelist and writer (born 1943)

- Born: 1943 (age 82–83)
- Occupations: Writer, novelist
- Children: Joshua Waitzkin, Katya Waitzkin
- Writing career
- Notable work: Searching for Bobby Fischer
- Website: joshwaitzkin.com

Fred Waitzkin (born 1943 in Massachusetts) is an American novelist and writer for The New York Times Sunday Magazine, New York, and Esquire. He graduated from Kenyon College in Gambier, Ohio in 1965, and lives in New York City and Martha's Vineyard.

Waitzkin is the father of chess prodigy Joshua Waitzkin and wrote a book about his son called Searching for Bobby Fischer; he felt that Joshua could be a successor to Bobby Fischer. The book was praised by Grandmaster Nigel Short, as well as chess journalist Edward Winter, who called it "a delightful book" in which "the topics [are] treated with an acuity and grace that offer the reviewer something quotable on almost every page." Screenwriter and playwright Tom Stoppard called the book "well written" and "captivating". The book was made into the Academy Award-nominated namesake film (but released in the U.K. as Innocent Moves), with Joe Mantegna playing Joshua Waitzkin's father.

== Major works ==
- 1988: Searching for Bobby Fischer: The Father of a Prodigy Observes the World of Chess
- —; Fred Waitzkin (1 August 1995). Attacking Chess: Aggressive Strategies and Inside Moves from the U.S. Junior Chess Champion. Simon and Schuster. ISBN 978-0-684-80250-3.
- — (2001). The Last Marlin: The Story of a Father and Son. Penguin Books. ISBN 978-0-14-100188-3.
- — (2013). Mortal Games: The Turbulent Genius of Garry Kasparov. Perseus Books Group. ISBN 978-0-7867-5487-8.

== See also ==
- List of books and documentaries by or about Bobby Fischer
