= Nodar Djin =

Soviet writer (1947-2002)

- Born: Nodar Yakovlevich Dzindzichashvili; January 8, 1947; Tbilisi
- Died: April 4, 2002 (aged 55); Washington, D.C.
- Other name: Nodar Djindjihashvili
- Occupations: writer, journalist, philosopher
- Notable work: Last Journey; Five Tales of Vanity; The Story of My Suicide

Nodar Djin (Russian: Нодар Джин; January 8, 1947 — April 4, 2002) was a Georgian-born Russian writer, journalist and philosopher.

== Biography ==
Born in Georgia, lived in Moscow. His grandfather was a rabbi, his father was a lawyer. In 1963, he graduated from the philological faculty of the Tbilisi University, in 1966 at the VGIK. In 1968 he defended his thesis on aesthetics, and in 1977 became the youngest Doctor of Philosophy in the history of the USSR. He worked at the Institute of Philosophy, Russian Academy of Sciences, at Moscow State University and Tbilisi State University.

From 1980 he lived in the USA, where he worked in the field of radio and photojournalism, published books on the philosophy. Professor of Philosophy, in 1981, he won the Rockefeller Prize in Humanities. His documentary Last Journey, created by his own photographs, won a number of prizes at international film festivals in the United States. He was fluent in eight languages.

Djin authored many studies on philosophy and cultural history, aesthetics and psychology, as well as novels. The American press called him a strikingly versatile and sophisticated intellectual, and The New Republic in connection with his sensational case against the Voice of America radio station, called him Citizen Djin by analogy with the hero of the classic film Citizen Kane.

His older brother is known chess player Roman Dzindzichashvili. His daughter is poet Yana Djin.
