= John Grefe =

American chess player (1947–2013)

Personal information
- Born: September 6, 1947 Hoboken, New Jersey, U.S.
- Died: December 22, 2013 (aged 66) San Francisco, California, U.S.

Chess career
- Country: United States
- Title: International Master (1975)
- Peak rating: 2470 (May 1974)

John Alan Grefe (September 6, 1947 – December 22, 2013) was an American International Master of chess.

== Biography ==
Born in Hoboken, New Jersey, his best result was a tie for first with Lubomir Kavalek in the 1973 U.S. Championship. FIDE awarded him the title of International Master in 1975. Grefe and Stuart Rachels are the only players since 1948 to have won or shared the U.S. Championship without already having, or having later achieved, the title of International Grandmaster. Grefe, at the time he shared the championship, lived in Berkeley, California, and was a follower of the Guru Maharaj Ji. For that reason and also because of his hippyish appearance, Grefe was affectionately known as "Gandalf" amongst chess friends.

Before his success in the U.S. Championship, Grefe had been fairly successful in Swiss system tournaments in the United States. He tied for eighth in the 1969 and 1971 U.S. Open, tied for first in the 1971 National Open, finished sixth at Lone Pine 1971, tied for fourth through sixth at Lone Pine 1973, and finished sixth in the 1973 U.S. Open.

Grefe died of liver cancer on December 22, 2013, in San Francisco, California.

== Notable games ==
His decisive win over Walter Browne, later a six-time winner of the U.S. Championship himself, in the 1973 championship:

Grefe versus Browne, U.S. Championship 1973
1. e4 c5 2. Nf3 d6 3. d4 cxd4 4. Nxd4 Nf6 5. Nc3 a6 6. Bg5 e6 7. f4 Be7 8. Qf3 h6 9. Bh4 Qc7 10. 0-0-0 Nbd7 11. Be2 Rb8 12. Qg3 Rg8 13. Rhf1 g5 14. fxg5 Ne5 15. Nf3 b5 16. Nxe5 b4 17. Nxf7 bxc3 18. gxf6 Rxg3 19. fxe7 Rg5 20. Bxg5 hxg5 21. Nxd6+ 1–0

A brilliancy against veteran grandmaster Miguel Najdorf:

Grefe versus Najdorf, Lone Pine 1976
1. e4 e5 2. Nf3 d6 3. d4 Nf6 4. Nc3 Nbd7 5. Bc4 Be7 6. 0-0 0-0 7. Qe2 c6 8. a4 Qc7 9. h3 exd4 10. Nxd4 Re8 11. Bf4 Ne5 12. Bb3 Nfd7 13. Rad1 Bf8 14. Bc1 Nc5 15. Ba2 d5 16. f4 Ned7 17. e5 Nb6 18. a5 Nbd7 19. Qh5 Ne6 20. Nf5 Qxa5 21. Rf3 Nb6 22. Rg3 g6 23. Qh4 Na4 24. Rxd5!? Qb6+ On 25...cxd5, Shredder analyzes 26.Nxd5 Bg7 27.Nxg7 Kxg7 28.Nf6 h5 29.f5 Rh8 30.Nd7! Bxd7 31.Qf6+ Kg8 32.Kh2 followed by Rxg6+ or fxg6. 25. Be3 Qb4? Rybka considers the queen sacrifice 25...Nxc3! 26.Bxb6 Ne2+ 27.Kh2 axb6 favorable to Black. 26. Rb5! Nxc3 27. Rxb4 Ne2+ 28. Kh2 Nxg3 29. Qxg3 Bxb4 30. Nh6+ Kh8 31. f5! Nd8 32. fxg6 fxg6 33. Qf4 Bf8 34. Nf7+ Nxf7 35. Qxf7 Be6 36. Bxe6 Bg7 37. Bd4 Rad8 38. Bc3 b5 39. Bd7 Rf8 40. Qe7 1–0 (Analysis from Chessgames.com)

Preceded by Robert Byrne	United States Chess Champion; 1973 (with Lubomir Kavalek)	Succeeded by Walter Browne
