= Yana Djin =

American poet (born 1969)

- Born: Yana Nodarovna Dzhindzhikhashvili; 1969 (age 56–57); Tbilisi, Soviet Union
- Occupation: Poet

Yana Djin (born Yana Nodarovna Dzhindzhikhashvili; 1969, in Tbilisi, Soviet Union) is a Georgian-American poet.

== Life ==
In 1980, she emigrated to the United States, where she studied philosophy. Her first book of poetry, Bits and Pieces of Conversations, was published in the US in 1994. Her father was writer Nodar Djin and her uncle is famous chess grandmaster Roman Dzhindzhichashvili.

Her Russian translation poems were first published in 1997 in the Literaturnaya Gazeta under the heading "The New Literary Star" followed by the publications in the literary magazines Druzhba Narodov and Novy Mir. Her translations of Vladimir Gandelsman appeared in Metamorphoses, and an anthology.

In 2000, Yana Djin's book of poetry (in English and Russian) Inevitable was published in Moscow to critical acclaim. In 2003 her third book of poetry Realm of Doubts was published by the OGI publishing house. She wrote a biweekly social-political column "Letters from America" for the English language Moscow News.

She lived in Washington, D.C., and appeared at The DC Arts Center. She lives in New York.

== Works ==
- "Untitled and Unrhymed or a Bit Too Personal", Произведения в системе Литсовет. 2002
- Bits and Pieces of Conversations, Poetry, H. A. Frager & Company, 1994, ISBN 978-0-929647-04-3
- ''Yana Djin, Poem Hunter, 2009
- Стихи Яны Джин из сборников «Неизбежное» и «Неприкаянность» в переводах Нодара Джина (Yana Djin. Inevitable. Moscow: Podkova, 2000; Realm of Doubts. Moscow: OGI, 2002). ISBN 5-94282-070-8

=== Anthologies ===
- High, John (ed) Crossing Centuries, Small Press Distribution, 1/9/2000, ISBN 978-1-883689-89-6
