= Shaun Taulbut =

English chess player (born 1958)

Personal information
- Born: January 11, 1958 (age 68) Portsmouth, England

Chess career
- Country: England
- Title: International Master (1978)
- Peak rating: 2465 (July 1982)

Shaun M. Taulbut is an English chess player.

== Chess career ==
In December 1972, he won his opening match in the Hastings International Chess Congress.

In 1977, he won the European Junior Chess Championship for 1977.

He was the chess coach of super-grandmaster Michael Adams.

In April 2011, he defeated grandmaster Simon Williams in the first round of the RAC Centenary Chess Exhibition.
