= William Martz =

American chess player (1945–1983)

Bill Martz
Personal information
- Full name: William Edward Martz
- Born: March 21, 1945 Detroit, Michigan
- Died: January 17, 1983 (aged 37) Milwaukee, Wisconsin

Chess career
- Country: United States
- Title: International Master (1975)

William Edward Martz (March 21, 1945 – January 17, 1983) was an American chess International Master, who was active from 1963 until his death in 1983.

== Chess career ==
Martz won the U.S. Junior Chess Championship in 1965. He played in the U.S. Chess Championship in 1972 and 1973, and was invited several times to the exclusive Lone Pine International tournament in the 1970s. In 1982 Martz was co-winner of the U.S. Open Chess Championship. He was the highest-rated player from Wisconsin for almost 20 years, and was awarded the title of International Master in 1975. Martz also is said to hold the USCF record for the most consecutive rated games without a loss, with 104.

== Personal life ==
Martz was born in Detroit but lived and worked in the Milwaukee area most of his life. He died in Milwaukee of cancer on January 17, 1983, at the age of 37, married to Norma Martz of Milwaukee.

== Notable games ==
Position: a8 black rook, e8 black rook, g8 black king, b7 black pawn, c7 white bishop, d7 black queen, f7 black pawn, g7 black pawn, h7 black pawn, a6 black pawn, f6 black bishop, c5 white queen, d5 white pawn, c3 white knight, g3 white pawn, h3 black bishop, a2 white pawn, b2 white pawn, e2 white pawn, h2 white pawn, a1 white rook, f1 white rook, g1 white king

Position after 23...Qd7

William Martz vs. Tony Miles, Lone Pine 1976:
1.d4 Nf6 2.c4 c5 3.Nf3 cxd4 4.Nxd4 a6 5.g3 d5 6.Bg2 e5 7.Nf3 e4 8.Nfd2 e3 9.fxe3 Ng4 10.cxd5 Nxe3 11.Qa4+ Nd7 12.Qe4+ Qe7 13.Nb3 Nxg2+ 14.Qxg2 Nc5 15.Nxc5 Qxc5 16.Qe4+ Be7 17.Nc3 0-0 18.Be3 Qd6 19.Bf4 Qd8 20.Qd4 Re8 21.0-0 Bf6 22.Qc5 Bh3 23.Bc7 Qd7 (diagram) 24.Rxf6 gxf6 25.d6 Re5 26.Qd4 Rc8 27.Rd1 Be6 28.Qh4 Rf5 29.Rd4 Rxc7 30.Rg4+ Rg5 31.Rxg5+ fxg5 32.Qxg5+ Kf8 33.Qh6+ Ke8 34.Ne4 1–0
