= Roman Dzindzichashvili =

Soviet-Israeli-American chess grandmaster (born 1944)

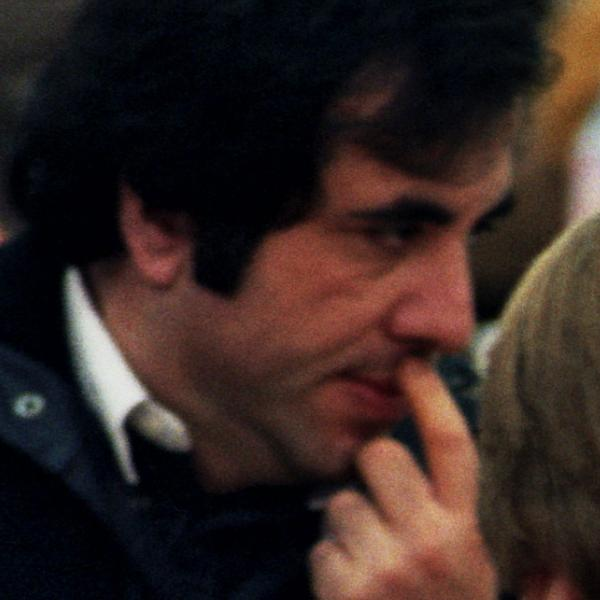
- Dzindzichashvili in 1984

Personal information
- Native name: რომან იაკობის-ძე ჯინჯიხაშვილი
- Born: May 5, 1944 (age 82) Tbilisi, Georgian SSR, Soviet Union

Chess career
- Country: Soviet Union (before 1976); Israel (1976−1984); United States (after 1984)
- Title: Grandmaster (1977)
- FIDE rating: 2550 (October 2026)
- Peak rating: 2595 (October 1978)
- Peak ranking: No. 13 (January 1979)

Roman Yakovlevich Dzindzichashvili (Georgian: რომან იაკობის-ძე ჯინჯიხაშვილი; Hebrew: רומן יעקובלביץ' דזינדזיכאשווילי; Russian: Роман Яковлевич Дзинджичашвили, pronounced jin-jee-khash-VEE-lee; born May 5, 1944) is a Soviet-born Israeli-American chess player. He was awarded the title Grandmaster by FIDE in 1977.

== Life and career ==
Born in Tbilisi, Georgian SSR into a family of Georgian Jews, his younger brother is Nodar Djin. Dzindzichashvili won the Junior Championship of the Soviet Union in 1962 and the University Championships in 1966 and 1968. In 1970, he was awarded the title of International Master by FIDE. He left the U.S.S.R. in 1976 for Israel and earned the Grandmaster (GM) title in 1977. One of his best career performances was first place at the 53rd Hastings Chess Festival in 1977/1978, scoring 10½ out of 14 points, a full point ahead of former world champion Tigran Petrosian. In 1979, he settled in the United States, and he won the Lone Pine tournament the next year. He led the U.S.team at the Chess Olympiad in 1984.

He won the U.S. Chess Championship twice, in 1983 and again in 1989, sharing the title with two other players each time. He briefly took up residence in Washington Square Park in New York City, and hustled chess during the 1980s, making a living playing blitz for stakes, as is popular there. He had a cameo in the 1993 film Searching for Bobby Fischer. He also had a brief appearance in Men Who Would Be Kings, a documentary about chess in Washington Square Park set in the 1980s.

Dzindzichashvili is a well-known theoretician and a chess coach. Among his students were 5-time U.S. Champion Gata Kamsky and Eugene Perelshteyn. He is the author and star of multiple chess instructional DVDs entitled "Roman's Lab". He currently produces instructional videos for Chess.com. Topics include openings, middlegames, endgames, famous players, and interesting games.

He is one of the founders of Chess.net internet chess server project, started in 1993. He played third board for the "GGGg" team that won the Amateur Team East tournament in February 2008.

Dzindzichashvili was the highest-rated American player on the January 1985 and July 1985 (shared with Yasser Seirawan) FIDE rating lists.

== Notable games ==
Dzindzichahsvili vs. Fritz

Position: a8 black rook, c8 black bishop, f8 black king, a7 black pawn, b7 black pawn, f7 white queen, g7 black pawn, f6 white bishop, h6 black rook, d5 black pawn, f5 black pawn, g5 white knight, d3 black pawn, a2 white pawn, b2 white pawn, c2 white pawn, f2 white pawn, g2 white pawn, h2 white pawn, g1 white king

Final position after 28.Qf7#
Grigoryan vs. Dzindzichahsvili

Position: h1 white rook, f1 white king, b1 white knight, a1 white rook, g2 white pawn, f2 black pawn, b2 white pawn, a2 white pawn, c3 white pawn, h4 white pawn, e4 white knight, b4 black pawn, g5 white bishop, e5 black pawn, h6 black knight, c6 black pawn, b6 black bishop, h7 black pawn, g7 black pawn, d7 black pawn, a7 black pawn, g8 black king, f8 black rook, d8 black queen, c8 black bishop, a8 white queen

Final position after 14...b4
- Dzindzichashvili played a series of rapid games against the computer program Fritz in 1991 and 1993. In the following game he checkmated the program in only 28 moves.
  Dzindzichashvili vs. Fritz, 1991
  1.d4 e6 2.e4 d5 3.e5 c5 4.Nf3 Nc6 5.Bd3 cxd4 6.0-0 Bc5 7.Re1 Nge7 8.Nbd2 0-0 9.Bxh7+ Kxh7 10.Ng5+ Kg6 11.Qg4 Nxe5 12.Rxe5 f5 13.Qg3 Rf7 14.Ndf3 Qh8 15.Nh4+ Qxh4 16.Qxh4 Rf8 17.Qh7+ Kf6 18.Nf3 Ng6 19.Bg5+ Kf7 20.Qh5 Rh8 21.Rxf5+ Kg8 22.Qxg6 exf5 23.Bf6 Rh7 24.Re1 d3 25.Re8+ Bf8 26.Ng5 Rh6 27.Rxf8+ Kxf8 28.Qf7#
- In a match held on March 3–7, 2008, Dzindzichashvili played a series of eight games, time control 45'+10", against the computer program Rybka, with Rybka giving odds of pawn and move. The series ended in a 4–4 tie. A return match, at the same odds, was played on July 28, 2008, at the faster than tournament time control (30'+20"). Rybka 3, running on eight CPUs, won by the score 2½–1½ (1 victory and 3 draws).
- In 1969, in the USSR, Dzindzichahsvili had a quick win against GM Grigorian.
Karen Grigoryan vs. Roman Dzindzichahsvili; Ruy Lopez, Classical Defence
1.e4 e5 2.Nf3 Nc6 3.Bb5 Bc5 4.c3 f5 5.d4 fxe4 6.Ng5 Bb6 7.d5 e3 8.dxc6 bxc6 9.h4 exf2+ 10.Kf1 cxb5 11.Qd5 Nh6 12.Qxa8 c6 13.Ne4 0-0 14.Bg5 b4 (diagram) (prepares 15...Ba6+ followed by 16...Qxa8) 0–1

== See also ==
- List of Jewish chess players

Preceded by Walter Browne and Yasser Seirawan	United States Chess Champion; 1983 (with Walter Browne and Larry Christiansen)	Succeeded by Lev Alburt
Preceded by Michael Wilder	United States Chess Champion; 1989 (with Yasser Seirawan and Stuart Rachels)	Succeeded by Lev Alburt
