= Dragutin Šahović =

Serbian chess grandmaster

Dragutin Šahović (1940 in Kraljevo – 2005 in Belgrade) was a chess Grandmaster. With his highest Elo being 2520.

He tied for first place in the 1977 Lone Pine International tournament.
