= Olimpiu Di Luppi =

Singaporean born-Romanian historian and chess player (born 1977)

Personal information
- Born: 1977 (age 48–49)

Chess career
- Country: Romania (until 2011); Singapore (since 2011)
- Title: Candidate Master (2013)
- Peak rating: 2210 (January 1997)

Olimpiu Di Luppi (né Urcan) is a historian and author. Of Italian and Turkish heritage, but born in Romania, he has been a Permanent Resident in Singapore since 2002, where he works as a consultant on advanced research in Arts and Humanities. He is a long-time contributor to Edward Winter's Chess Notes.

== The Capablanca Project ==
On June 26, 2021, Di Luppi announced in Chess Notes the "Capablanca Project," which comprises a scholarly pictorial biography, a graphic novel and a documentary. According to his project's website, "In addition to a comprehensive chronicle, the aim is to salvage, restore and preserve material related to the Cuban marvel."

== Bibliography ==
- Surviving Changi: E.E. Colman - A Chess Biography, Singapore Heritage Society, 2007. ISBN 978-981-05-7922-7
- Adolf Albin in America: A European Chess Master's Sojourn, 1893-1895, McFarland, 2008. ISBN 978-0-7864-3010-9
- Julius Finn: A Chess Master's Life In America, 1871-1931, McFarland, 2010. ISBN 978-0-7864-4283-6
- Arthur Kaufmann: A Chess Biography, 1872-1938, McFarland, 2012 (with Peter Michael Braunwarth). ISBN 978-0-7864-6145-5
- Singapore Chess: A History, 1945-1990, World Scientific, 2017 (with Shashi Jayakumar). ISBN 978-9814733229
- W.H.K. Pollock: A Chess Biography with 523 Games, McFarland, 2017 (with John S. Hilbert). ISBN 978-0-7864-5868-4
- East Meets East: Inside the 2024 World Chess Championship in Singapore, World Scientific, 2025. ISBN 978-981-98-1280-6
