= Eugene Perelshteyn =

American chess grandmaster and writer (born 1980)

Personal information
- Born: February 2, 1980 (age 46) Zhytomyr, Ukrainian SSR, Soviet Union (now Ukraine)

Chess career
- Country: United States
- Title: Grandmaster (2006)
- FIDE rating: 2475 (July 2026)
- Peak rating: 2555 (July 2008)

Eugene Perelshteyn (born February 2, 1980) is an American chess player and writer. He earned the FIDE Master title in 1997, the International Master title in 2001, and the Grandmaster title in 2006.

== Chess career ==
Born in Zhytomyr, Ukrainian SSR (now Ukraine), Perelshteyn began playing chess at around seven years old, taught by his father, Mikhail Perelshteyn, a FIDE master and professional chess coach. At age 10, he began playing in his first tournaments. He moved to the United States in 1994. He won the U.S. Junior Closed Championship in 2000 and was awarded the Samford Chess Fellowship by the US Chess Trust in 2001. After taking two years off from school to play chess professionally, Perelshteyn returned to the University of Maryland, Baltimore County, and graduated in 2004.

After graduating, Perelshteyn returned to chess, winning the 2007 SPICE Cup and tying for first in the B group in the 2009 SPICE Cup. Perelshteyn has also placed second in the 2012 Canadian Open Chess Championship and tied for first in the 2016 Golden State Open. In March 2018, Perelshteyn tied for fourth in the Reykjavik Open, scoring 6½/9 points.

He has co-authored two chess books with Lev Alburt and Roman Dzindzichashvili: Chess Openings for Black, Explained: A Complete Repertoire (2009), and Chess Openings for White, Explained: Winning with 1.e4 (2010). He has since converted his books into a website, ChessOpeningsExplained.com, in which he shares his knowledge of the Hyper-Accelerated Sicilian Dragon. In August 2015, Perelshteyn also collaborated with programmer Peter Pashkov to develop the Android application Chess Genie, which offers tactical exercises to its users.

In October 2022, Perelshteyn co-authored Evaluate Like a Grandmaster with Nate Solon, a book designed to help players quickly evaluate complex positions.
