= Bill Wall =

Personal information
- Born: 1931/32
- Died: August 4, 2014 (aged 83) Bermuda Dunes, California

Career information
- High school: Marysville (Marysville, Ohio)
- Coaching career: 1953–1975

Career history

Coaching
- 1953–1954: Summit Station HS
- 1955–1956: Grandview Heights HS
- 1956–1957: Ripon (assistant)
- 1957–1975: MacMurray

Career highlights
- FIBA Order of Merit (1994); MacMurray College Hall of Fame (1988)
- Women's Basketball Hall of Fame
- Collegiate Basketball Hall of Fame

William L. Wall (1931/32 – August 4, 2014) was president (1972) of the National Association of Basketball Coaches (NABC) and also served as the executive director of the organization from 1973 to 1975 while he was still at MacMurray College.

He died at his home in Bermuda Dunes, California. Wall was inducted into the Women's Basketball Hall of Fame in 2004.
