= Stuart Rachels =

American philosopher and chess player (born 1969)

Personal information
- Born: September 26, 1969 (age 57) Birmingham, Alabama

Chess career
- Country: United States
- Title: International Master (1989)
- FIDE rating: 2423 (November 2026)
- Peak rating: 2485 (January 1991)

Stuart Rachels (born September 26, 1969) is an American philosopher and International Master of chess. He is the son of the philosopher James Rachels (1941–2003). He tied for first place in the 1989–90 U.S. Chess Championship. Although he is no longer an active player, his FIDE rating is 2485 and his USCF rating is 2605.

== Biography ==
The son of philosopher James Rachels, Stuart Rachels grew up in Birmingham, Alabama. He received a B.A. in philosophy, with highest honors, from Emory University in 1991, another B.A., in philosophy and politics, from Oxford University in 1993 on a Marshall Scholarship, and a Ph.D. from Syracuse University in 1998.

In 1981, at the age of 11 years and 10 months, he became the youngest chess master in U.S. history, a record that stood until 1994. He won the United States Junior Invitational Championship in 1988. His greatest chess achievement was tying for first place in the 1989–90 U.S. Championship with grandmasters Roman Dzindzichashvili and Yasser Seirawan. This qualified him to play in the 1990 Manila Interzonal, where he achieved a respectable score of 6 points out of 13 games. Rachels and John Grefe, the 1973 U.S. co-champion, are the only players since 1948 to win or share the U.S. Championship who did not become grandmasters.

FIDE awarded him the International Master title, and he also received the equivalent of two grandmaster norms, one short of the number needed for the title. Rachels retired from chess in 1993. In 2020, New in Chess published his book The Best I Saw in Chess; it was recognized by the Chess Journalists of America as that year's "Best Book, Other" and was shortlisted in the English Chess Federation "Book of the Year" competition.

In 1999, Rachels became an assistant professor in the Philosophy Department at the University of Alabama in Tuscaloosa, Alabama. In 2004, he was promoted to associate professor. He has released later editions of some of his father's books, notably The Elements of Moral Philosophy and Problems from Philosophy.

== Notable game ==
Kudrin vs. Rachels, Long Beach 1989

Position: g1 white king, f1 white rook, h2 white rook, g3 black pawn, e3 black queen, b3 white pawn, f4 white pawn, c4 white pawn, a4 white pawn, d5 white pawn, a5 white queen, f6 black bishop, d6 black pawn, f7 black pawn, e7 black pawn, d7 black knight, b7 black pawn, a7 white knight, h8 black rook, b8 black king

Final position

Kudrin vs. Rachels; U.S. Championship, Long Beach 1989:
1.e4 c5 2.Nf3 Nc6 3.d4 cxd4 4.Nxd4 Nf6 5.Nc3 d6 6.g3 g6 7.Nde2 Bd7 8.Bg2 Qc8 9.Nd5 Bg7 10.0-0 Nxd5 11.exd5 Ne5 12.a4 Bh3 13.Ra2 h5 14.Bxh3 Qxh3 15.f3 g5 16.Kh1 Bf6 17.b3 Qf5 18.Nd4 Qg6 19.c4 g4 20.Rg2 h4 21.gxh4 Rxh4 22.f4 Nd7 23.Nb5 0-0-0 24.Nxa7+ Kb8 25.Be3 Rdh8 26.Qe1 g3 27.Qa5 Rxh2+ 28.Rxh2 Qe4+ 29.Kg1 Qxe3+ 0–1

== Selected publications ==
- On Three Alleged Theories of Rational Behavior. Utilitas, Vol. 21, Issue 4 (December 2009), pp. 506–520. doi:10.1017/S0953820809990252 (subscription required)
- Vegetarianism. In Tom L. Beauchamp and R. G. Frey. (2011). The Oxford Handbook of Animal Ethics. Oxford University Press.

== Notes ==
Achievements
Preceded by John Jarecki	Youngest ever United States chessmaster 1981–1994	Succeeded by Jordy Mont-Reynaud

Preceded by Michael Wilder	United States Chess Champion; 1989 (with Roman Dzindzichashvili and Yasser Seirawan)	Succeeded by Lev Alburt
