= Joshua Waitzkin =

American chess player (born 1976)

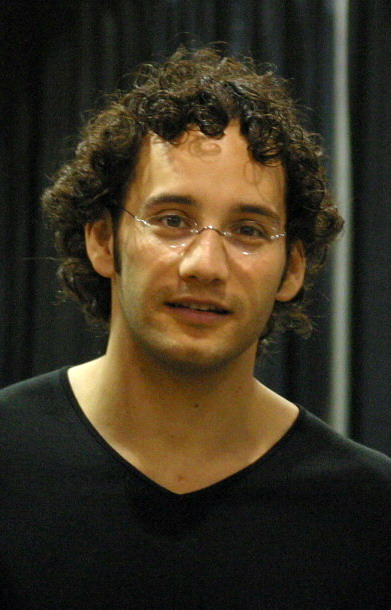
- Waitzkin in 2005

Personal information
- Born: December 4, 1976 (age 49) New York City, U.S.

Chess career
- Country: United States
- Title: International Master (1993)
- FIDE rating: 2464 (August 2026)
- Peak rating: 2480 (July 1998)

Joshua Waitzkin (born December 4, 1976) is an American former chess player, martial arts world champion, and author. As a child, he was recognized as a prodigy, and won the U.S. Junior Chess championship in 1993 and 1994. The film Searching for Bobby Fischer is based on his early life.

== Early life and education ==
Waitzkin first noticed the game of chess being played while walking with his mother in New York City's Washington Square Park at the age of six. At age seven, Waitzkin began studying the game with his first formal teacher Bruce Pandolfini. During his years as a student at Dalton he led the school to win seven national team championships between the third and ninth grades, in addition to his eight individual titles. In 1999, Waitzkin enrolled at Columbia University, where he studied philosophy.

At ten years old, Waitzkin played a notable game featuring a sacrifice of his queen and rook in exchange for a checkmate six moves later. At 11, Waitzkin and fellow prodigy K. K. Karanja were the only two children to draw with World Champion Garry Kasparov in an exhibition event where Kasparov played simultaneously against 59 youngsters. At age 13, he earned the title of National Master, and at age 16 became an International Master.

Waitzkin has not played in a US Chess Federation tournament since 1999, and his last FIDE tournament was before 2000. Waitzkin has also stated in an interview his reasoning for leaving chess:

When people ask me why I stopped playing chess ... I tend to say that I lost the love. And I guess if I were to be a little bit more true, I would say that I became separated from my love; I became alienated from chess somewhat ... The need that I felt to win, to win, to win all the time, as opposed to the freedom to explore the art more and more deeply, and I think that started to move me away from the game and also chess for me was so intimate. It was something that I loved so deeply that when I started to become alienated from it, I couldn't do it in an impure way.

=== Film portrayal ===
The script for Paramount Pictures' 1993 film Searching for Bobby Fischer (released in the United Kingdom as Innocent Moves) was based on a 1988 book by Waitzkin's father, Fred Waitzkin: Searching for Bobby Fischer: The Father of a Prodigy Observes the World of Chess. Waitzkin makes a cameo in the film.

== Author ==
Waitzkin is the author of two books: Attacking Chess: Aggressive Strategies, Inside Moves from the U.S. Junior Chess Champion (1995) and The Art of Learning: An Inner Journey to Optimal Performance (2008), an autobiographical discussion of the learning process and performance psychology drawn from Waitzkin's experiences in both chess and the martial arts. He is also the spokesperson for the Chessmaster video game series, and is featured in the game giving advice and game analysis.

Waitzkin has a chapter giving advice in Tim Ferriss' book Tools of Titans.

== Martial arts ==
As a young adult, Waitzkin's focus shifted to the martial art tai chi. He holds several US national medals and a 2004 world champion title in the competitive sport of tai chi pushing hands. Waitzkin also became a championship coach, leading Grandmaster William C. C. Chen's US Pushing Hands Team to several titles at the Tai Chi World Cup in Taiwan, guiding teammates Jan Lucanus and Jan C. Childress to their world titles. Waitzkin is also a black belt in Brazilian jiu-jitsu under world champion Marcelo Garcia. Waitzkin is the co-founder of MGInAction.com and The Marcelo Garcia Academy, a Brazilian jiu-jitsu school located in New York City.

== Personal life ==
On April 23, 2010, Waitzkin married Desiree Cifre, a screenwriter and former contestant on The Amazing Race.

In an interview with Dr Andrew Huberman on the podcast The Huberman Lab in January 2025, Waitzkin reported that he had drowned while doing breathwork in a swimming pool. He also mentioned that he broke his back while sparring during a Jiu Jitsu training session. This injury ultimately led to Waitzkin retiring from competitive Jiu Jitsu and instead begin coaching others in it.

His grandmother was artist Stella Waitzkin.

On May 5, 2025, it was announced that Waitzkin had been working with the Boston Celtics of the National Basketball Association as a consultant. Subsequent reports detailed that Waitzkin had been working closely with Joe Mazzulla since the 2022–23 NBA season.

== See also ==
- List of Jewish chess players
- Searching for Bobby Fischer
