= Simon Williams (chess player) =

English chess grandmaster (born 1979)

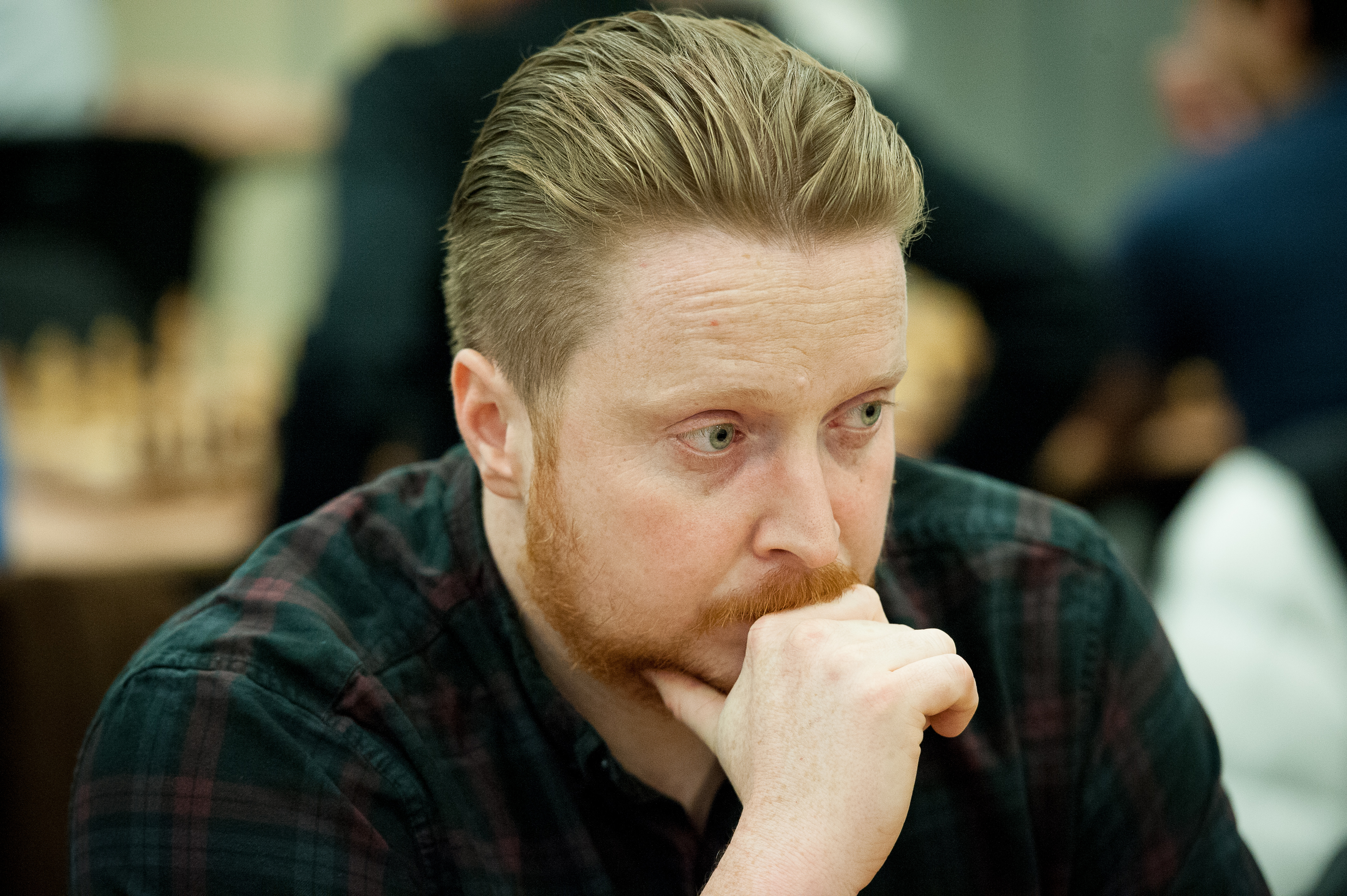
- Williams at the London Chess Classic 2016.

Personal information
- Born: Simon Kim Williams; November 30, 1979 (age 46) Surrey, England

Chess career
- Country: England
- Title: Grandmaster (2008)
- FIDE rating: 2449 (September 2026)
- Peak rating: 2550 (November 2009)

Simon Kim Williams is an English chess grandmaster and author who is best known under the pseudonym and Chess Server Nickname "GingerGM".

== Early career ==
In 1993, he received his first international FIDE rating of 2255. During the same year he finished seventh in the European Under-14 Championship. Williams regularly participated in youth tournaments throughout the 1990s, finishing tied for seventh in the 1997 European Under-20 Championship and finishing second in the Smith and Williamson Young Masters in 1998.

== Grandmaster ==
He became a Grandmaster in 2008, achieving the final norm at the Hastings International Chess Congress 2005/2006 and the 2500+ rating at Hastings 2007/2008. His peak rating so far is 2550, achieved in November 2009. In 2009, he organised the Big Slick International in Purley, London, which comprised an invitational GM tournament and FIDE Rated Open.

=== National performance ===
In 2003, he finished seventh at the British Chess Championship. Williams later improved his performance in the tournament, finishing equal second in 2009.

In 2009, Williams finished equal first at the Southend Chess Congress Jack Speigel Memorial Tournament.

=== International performance ===
He was joint winner with Gawain Jones of the London Chess Classic FIDE Rated Open in December 2010, with a rating performance of 2690.

=== Blitz and rapidplay ===
In 2005, he won the British Blitz Championship.

== Chess commentary ==
Williams works as a chess commentator at tournaments and through online streaming. Most notably, he has provided official commentary at the Gibraltar Chess Festival alongside Irina Krush, Elisabeth Pähtz in 2016 and Jovanka Houska in 2017 and 2018. He has covered a number of other tournaments for ChessBase and Chess.com. Williams also maintains a YouTube channel where he uploads blitz chess (and other time controls) games with commentary as well as analysis of his previous games. He has also given commentary on the Chess.com Isle of Man tournament.

== Chess publication company ==
In 2008, he founded a chess media publishing company called "GingerGM" with International Master Simon Ansell. The company produces print books, ebooks and DVDs.

== Pension company ==
Williams was director of the company SKW Investments, which was implicated by HM Revenue and Customs in a pension liberation scheme. Williams said his role was "purely administrative", that he "did not understand the responsibilities required" and that he regretted involvement. In September 2023, the Deputy Pensions Ombudsman ordered him to repay roughly £700,000 into the scheme.

== Works ==
=== Books ===
- Williams, Simon (2003). Play The Classical Dutch. Gambit Publications. ISBN 978-1-901983-88-3.
- Williams, Simon (2004). Improve Your Attacking Chess. Gambit Publications. ISBN 978-1-904600-09-1.
- Williams, Simon (2008). How To Crush Your Chess Opponents. Gambit Publications. ISBN 978-1-904600-99-2.
- Williams, Simon (2009). The New Sicilian Dragon. Everyman Chess. ISBN 978-1-85744-615-9.
- Williams, Simon (2010). How To Win At Chess - Quickly!. Everyman Chess. ISBN 978-1-85744-631-9.
- Palliser, Richard; Williams, Simon; Vigus, James (2010). Dangerous Weapons: The Dutch. Everyman Chess. ISBN 978-1-85744-624-1.
- Williams, Simon (2011). Attacking Chess: The French: A Dynamic Repertoire for Black. Everyman Chess. ISBN 978-1857446463.
- Williams, Simon (2011). SOS – Secrets of Opening Surprises 13 – Chapter 3 – The Williams Anti-Grunfeld Variation. New in Chess. ISBN 978-90-5691-341-0.
- Williams, Simon (2011). SOS – Secrets of Opening Surprises 14 – Chapter 4 – Kings Gambit: Tartakower Variation. New In Chess. ISBN 978-90-5691-366-3.
- Williams, Simon (2013). Killer Dutch - The Book. GingerGM and EPlus Books. ISBN 978-1-927179-15-4.
- Williams, Simon (2015). The Killer Dutch. Everyman Chess. ISBN 9781781942420.

=== DVDs ===
- Williams, Simon (2009). The Killer Dutch (DVD). United Kingdom: GingerGM.
- Williams, Simon (2010). The Killer French Volume 1 (DVD). United Kingdom: GingerGM.
- Williams, Simon (2010). The Killer French Volume 2 (DVD). United Kingdom: GingerGM.
- Williams, Simon (2011). The Killer Dragon Volume 1 (DVD). United Kingdom: GingerGM.
- Williams, Simon (2011). The Killer Dragon Volume 2 (DVD). United Kingdom: GingerGM.
- Williams, Simon (2012). Play Like Tal (DVD). United Kingdom: GingerGM.
- Williams, Simon (2012). Crash Test Chess Volume 1 Using The Initiative (DVD). United Kingdom: GingerGM.
- Williams, Simon (2012). Crash Test Chess Volume 2 Thinking Outside The Box (DVD). United Kingdom: GingerGM.
- Williams, Simon (2014). King's Gambit Volume 1 and 2 (DVD). Hamburg: Chessbase.
- Williams, Simon (2017). The London System with 2.Bf4 (DVD). Hamburg: Chessbase.

== Other publications ==
- The Jobava London System (2019) on Chessable.
- The Killer Dutch Rebooted (2019) on Chessable.
- The Iron English: Botvinnik Variation (2020) on Chessable, co-authored with IM Richard Palliser.
- The Black Lion (2020) on Chessable
- Grandmaster Gambits 1. e4 Part 1 (2021) on Chessable, co-authored with IM Richard Palliser.
- Grandmaster Gambits 1. e4 Part 2: Aggressive Lines (2021) on Chessable, co-authored with IM Richard Palliser.
- Best of British (2021) on Chessable, co-authored with IM Richard Palliser.
- The Best Chess Moves of All Time (2021) on Chessable, co-authored with Alex Belsley.
- The Killer Colle-Zuckertort System (2022) on Chessable, co-authored with IM Richard Palliser.
- The Harry Attack: Fighting Kingside Fianchettos after 1.d4 (2022) on Chessable, co-authored with IM Richard Palliser.
- The British Grand Prix Attack (2022) on Chessable, co-authored with IM Richard Palliser.
- Lifetime Repertoires: Modern Reti - Part 1 (2023) on Chessable, co-authored with IM Richard Palliser.
- The Killer Barry Attack (2023) on Chessable, co-authored with IM Richard Palliser
- Lifetime Repertoires: Bird Opening (2024) on Chessable, co-authored with GM Raven Sturt
- Lifetime Repertoires: Stonewall Dutch (2026) on Chessable

=== Checkmate Show ===
In 2017 and 2020, Williams filmed two seasons of a show named Checkmate with Anna Richardson as co-host. Each season showcased a prestigious tournament with both male and female competitors, including Richard Rapport, Ju Wenjun, Alexandra Kosteniuk, Arkadij Naiditsch, and Nigel Short. The show was later released on DVD format in 2018 and 2021.
