= Edward Winter (chess historian) =

English chess historian (born 1955)

Personal information
- Born: 1955 (age 70–71)

Chess career
- Country: United Kingdom

Edward Winter (born 1955) is an English chess journalist, archivist, historian, collector, and author. He writes a regular column on chess history, Chess Notes.

== Chess Notes ==
Chess Notes started as a bimonthly periodical, and was described by its author, in the first issue (January–February 1982), as "A forum for aficionados to discuss all matters relating to the Royal Pastime". At the end of 1989, the periodical ceased publication. In 1993, Winter resumed publication of Chess Notes, which appeared, this time, as a syndicated column, in many languages around the world. From 1998 to 2001, it was published exclusively in New In Chess. Later, it appeared online at the Chess Café website. Since September 2004, Chess Notes has been located at the website Chesshistory.com.

Between 1996 and 2006 four anthologies of Chess Notes were published in book form.

On 15 March 2020, in C.N. 11763, Edward Winter announced that from the end of March 2020, Chess Notes would no longer be updated regularly.

Yasser Seirawan calls Winter "the chess world's foremost authority on its rich history". Jan Timman has commented: "Writers on chess history and the games of yesteryear are not normally pathfinders or perfectionists, but Edward Winter is an exception, taking great pains not only to tackle difficult research tasks but also to present the facts precisely." William Hartston observed of him: "Edward Winter is probably the most meticulous and diligent researcher and chess writer around. For several years, from his home in Switzerland, he produced the much-admired Chess Notes, a privately published journal of chess history and anecdotes that was the scourge of all that was sloppy or dishonest in chess. Winter's brilliantly scathing style, always adopted in the noble cause of accuracy, gives his writings a marvellously entertaining as well as instructive quality." Harry Golombek remarked that Chess Notes is "written in a most refreshing acerbity of tone."

Chess writers whom Winter has criticized for poor work include Eric Schiller, Raymond Keene, and Larry Evans. Timman has observed of Winter: "When he criticizes another writer, he does so fairly by setting out the facts for the reader to inspect for himself."

== Capablanca ==
Winter has made a particular study of José Capablanca, and critics hailed his 1989 monograph on the Cuban world chess champion. Nigel Short described it as "undoubtedly one of the best chess books I have read," and Jeremy Silman called it "a piece of literature that has become a legend unto itself, and is universally viewed as one of the greatest books ever written about chess."

== Books ==
- World Chess Champions (editor); Pergamon Press Ltd; 1981; ISBN 0-08-024094-1.
- Capablanca: A Compendium of Games, Notes, Articles, Correspondence, Illustrations and Other Rare Archival Materials on the Cuban Chess Genius José Raúl Capablanca, 1888-1942; McFarland & Company; 1989; ISBN 9780899504551.
  - Paperback edition; 2011; ISBN 0786466340.
- Chess Explorations; Cadogan Books; 1996; ISBN 978-1857441710.
- Kings, Commoners and Knaves: Further Chess Explorations; Russell Enterprises; 1999; ISBN 978-1888690040.
- A Chess Omnibus; Russell Enterprises; 2003; ISBN 1-888690-17-8.
- Chess Facts and Fables; McFarland & Company; 2006; ISBN 978-0786423101.
