= Schul =

Schul may refer to:

- Bob Schul (1937–2024), American long-distance runner
- Zikmund Schul (1916–1944), a Jewish German composer

== See also ==
- Yiddish: Shul means synagogue
  - Polnische Schul
  - Schiffschul
  - Synagoga Kopszer Szul w Dyneburgu
  - Synagoga Altnaje Szul w Rydze
- Marta Litynska, née Shul' (born 1949)
- Jan Szul
- F. W. Putzgers Historischer Schul-Atlas
- Schuler, Shuler, Schuller
- Schulmann, Schulman, Shulman
- Schulberg
- Schulhof, Schulhofer
- Schule
- Schull
- Schuls
