= Sergey Belavenets =

Russian chess player (1910–1942)

Personal information
- Born: Sergey Vsevolodovich Belavenets; 18 July 1910 Smolensk, Russian Empire
- Died: 6 March 1942 (aged 31) Staraya Russa, Russian SFSR, Soviet Union

Chess career
- Country: Soviet Union
- Title: Chess Master

Sergey Vsevolodovich Belavenets (Russian: Серге́й Всеволодович Белавенец; 18 July 1910 – 6 March 1942) was a Soviet chess master, theoretician, and chess journalist.

== Early life ==
Belavenets was born in Smolensk to a noble family with a long history of serving in the Russian navy. He and Mikhail Yudovich, known as the Smolensk twins, had been close friends since meeting in a school match in 1925. Over the next few years they studied with Belavenets's uncle, Konstantin Vygodchikov.

== Chess career ==
Belavenets took 4th in the 2nd Belarusian Championship in 1925 (Solomon Rozental won), tied for 5-9th in the 11th Championship of Moscow in 1930, tied for 1st-3rd in the 13th Championship of Moscow in 1932, took 4th in the 14th Championship of Moscow in 1933/34, won at Moscow 1934 (the 4th Russian Championship), took 3rd in the 15th Championship of Moscow in 1935, tied for 3rd-5th in the 16th Championship of Moscow in 1936, shared 1st in the 17th Championship of Moscow 1937. He tied for 1st-2nd with Vasily Smyslov in the 18th Championship of Moscow in 1938, tied for 6-7th in the 19th Championship of Moscow in 1939/40, and took 2nd in the 20th Championship of Moscow in 1941.

== Death ==
While fighting in the Soviet Army during the Second World War, Belavenets was killed in action at Staraya Russa in 1942.

Since 1984, international chess competitions "In Memoriam of S.V.Belavenets" have been held in Smolensk.

His daughter Liudmila held the title of women's world correspondence chess champion from 1984 to 1992.
