= Robert Shulman =

Robert Shulman or Schulman may refer to:

- Robert G. Shulman (1924–2026), American biophysicist
- Robert Shulman (serial killer) (1954–2006), American serial killer
- Robert Schulman (journalist) (1917–2008), American journalist, co-founder of the Louisville Eccentric Observer
- E. Robert Schulman, pen name of American astronomer and science humorist Eric Schulman

== See also ==
- Schulman (disambiguation)
- Shulman (disambiguation)
