= Belarusian Chess Championship =

Competition to determine the Belarusian Champion in chess

This is a list of the winners of the Belarusian Chess Championships.

#	Year	Champions (men)
1	1924	Solomon Rosenthal
2	1925	Solomon Rosenthal
3	1926	Konstantin Vygodchikov
4	1928	Vladislav Silich
5	1932	Nikolai Riumin
6	1933	Abram Manevich
7	1934	Vladislav Silich
8	1936	Gavril Veresov
9	1937	Vladislav Silich
10	1938	Abram Manevich
11	1939	Gavril Veresov
12	1941	Gavril Veresov
13	1947	Vladimir Saigin
14	1948	Ratmir Kholmov
15	1949	Vladimir Saigin
16	1950	Vladimir Saigin
17	1951	Vladimir Saigin
18	1952	Isaac Boleslavsky; Vladimir Saigin
19	1953	Vladimir Saigin; Alexey Suetin
20	1954	Vladimir Saigin
21	1955	Alexey Suetin
22	1956	Boris Goldenov
23	1957	Alexey Suetin
24	1958	Gavril Veresov
25	1959	Alexey Suetin
26	1960	Alexey Suetin
27	1961	Alexey Suetin
28	1962	Albert Kapengut
29	1963	Gavril Veresov
30	1964	Isaac Boleslavsky
31	1965	Viacheslav Dydyshko
32	1966	Abram Roizman
33	1967	Albert Kapengut
34	1968	Albert Kapengut
35	1969	Albert Kapengut
36	1970	Viktor Zheliandinov
37	1971	Viacheslav Dydyshko
38	1972	Viktor Kupreichik
39	1973	Viacheslav Dydyshko
40	1974	Evgeny Mochalov
41	1975	Vladimir Veremeichik
42	1976	Albert Kapengut
43	1977	Albert Kapengut
44	1978	Albert Kapengut
45	1979	Viacheslav Dydyshko
46	1980	Viacheslav Dydyshko
47	1981	Boris Malisov
48	1982	Viacheslav Dydyshko; Peter Korzubov
49	1983	Sergey Yuferov; Leonid Basin
50	1984	Boris Gelfand
51	1985	Boris Gelfand
52	1986	Rustem Dautov
53	1987	Ilya Smirin
54	1988	Viacheslav Dydyshko
55	1989	Aleksej Aleksandrov
56	1990	Aleksej Aleksandrov
57	1991	Evgeny Mochalov; Viacheslav Dydyshko
58	1992	No contest
59	1993	Alexei Fedorov
60	1994	Yury Shulman
61	1995	Alexei Fedorov
62	1996	Aleksej Aleksandrov
63	1997	German Kochetkov
64	1998	Viacheslav Dydyshko
65	1999	Viacheslav Dydyshko
66	2000	Andrei Kovalev
67	2001	Sergei Azarov
68	2002	Sergei Azarov
69	2003	Viktor Kupreichik
70	2004	Andrei Malyush
71	2005	Alexei Fedorov
72	2006	Viacheslav Dydyshko
73	2007	Aleksej Aleksandrov
74	2008	Alexei Fedorov
75	2009	Sergei Zhigalko
76	2010	Evgeny Podolchenko
77	2011	Andrey Zhigalko
78	2012	Sergei Zhigalko
79	2013	Sergei Zhigalko
80	2014	Kirill Stupak
81	2015	Kirill Stupak
82	2016	Vladislav Kovalev
83	2017	Alexei Fedorov
84	2018	Aleksej Aleksandrov
85	2019	Aleksej Aleksandrov
86	2020	Mihail Nikitenko
87	2021	Kirill Stupak
88	2022	Maksim Tsaruk

#	Year	Champions (women)
1	1928	S. Duner
2	1939	Shames
3	1952	G. Neviadomskaya
4	1954	G. Neviadomskaya
5	1955	Nekrasova
6	1957	Elena Lychkovskaya; G. Neviadomskaya
7	1959	L. Chuvashova
8	1960	Kira Zvorykina
9	1961	Galina Archakova
10	1962	Galina Archakova
11	1963	Galina Archakova
12	1965	Tamara Golovey
13	1966	Galina Archakova
14	1968	Galina Archakova
15	1969	Tamara Golovey
16	1971	G. Ozhigina
17	1973	Kira Zvorykina
18	1974	Tatiana Kostina
19	1975	Kira Zvorykina
20	1976	Tamara Golovey
21	1977	Irina Turapina
22	1978	Ludmila Tsifanskaya
23	1979	G. Ozhigina
24	1980	Irina Turapina
25	1981	Elmira Khorovets
26	1982	Tatiana Zagorskaya
27	1983	Tatiana Zagorskaya
28	1984	Elmira Khorovets
29	1985	Rakhil Eidelson
30	1986	Irina Botvinnik
31	1987	Elmira Khorovets
32	1988	Elena Zayats
33	1989	Rakhil Eidelson
34	1990	Ilaha Kadimova
35	1991	O. Lomakina
36	1992	Tatiana Zagorskaya
37	1993	Rakhil Eidelson
38	1994	Tatiana Zagorskaya
39	1995	Rakhil Eidelson
40	1996	Tatiana Zagorskaya
41	1997	Rakhil Eidelson
42	1998	Rakhil Eidelson
43	1999	Natalia Popova
44	2000	Natalia Popova
45	2001	Irina Tetenkina
46	2002	Anna Sharevich
47	2003	Rakhil Eidelson
48	2004	Rakhil Eidelson
49	2005	Anna Sharevich
50	2006	Natalia Popova
51	2007	Anna Sharevich
52	2008	Natalia Popova
53	2009	Natalia Popova
54	2010	Nastassia Ziaziulkina
55	2011	Anna Sharevich
56	2012	Nastassia Ziaziulkina
57	2013	Nastassia Ziaziulkina
58	2014	Maria Nevioselaya
59	2015	Lanita Stetsko
60	2016	Nastassia Ziaziulkina
61	2017	Nastassia Ziaziulkina
62	2018	Nastassia Ziaziulkina
63	2019	Aliaksandra Tarasenka
64	2020	Kseniya Zeliantsova
65	2021	Aliaksandra Tarasenka
66	2022	Varvara Poliakova

{

#	Year	Champions (U20)
1	2020	Mihail Nikitenko
