= Evgeny Mochalov =

Belarusian chess player (born 1951)

Personal information
- Born: 29 October 1951 (age 74)

Chess career
- Country: Soviet Union; Belarus
- Title: International Master (1993)
- Peak rating: 2515 (January 1996)

Evgeny Mochalov (Russian: Евгений Вениаминович Мочалов; born 29 October 1951) is a Belarusian chess International Master (1993), two-times Belarusian Chess Championship winner (1974, 1991).

== Chess career ==
Evgeny Mochalov competed many times in the individual finals of the Belarusian Chess Championship, winning gold medals in 1974 and 1991 (together with Viacheslav Dydyshko), and silver medals - in 1988 and 1996. In 1979, in Moscow he won silver medal in Soviet Team Chess Championship for sixth board result.

His international chess tournaments successes include:

- won 1st place in Šaľa (1993),
- shared 2nd place in Bratislava (1993, after Vitali Golod, together with, among others, Konstantin Chernyshov),
- won 1st place in Polanica-Zdrój (1994, Akiba Rubinstein Memorial, Swiss-system tournament),
- won 1st place in Baku (1995),
- shared 3rd place in Kyiv (1995, Igor Platonov Memorial, after Dimitri Komarov, jointly with Stanislav Savchenko),
- ranked 3rd place in Oryol (1999, after Alexander Moiseenko).

Evgeny Mochalov played for Belarus in the Chess Olympiads:

- In 1996, at second reserve board in the 32nd Chess Olympiad in Yerevan (+2, =4, -2).

Evgeny Mochalov played for Belarus in the European Team Chess Championships:

- In 1992, at reserve board in the 10th European Team Chess Championship in Debrecen (+0, =4, -2).

In 2012, he won a bronze medal in the European Senior Chess Championship (chess players over 60 years of age) in Kaunas.

Evgeny Mochalov achieved the highest rating in his career on January 1, 1996, with a score of 2515 points, he was 6th among Belarusian chess players.
