= Stetsko =

Stetsko is a Ukrainian surname. Notable people with the surname include:

- Lanita Stetsko (born 1993), Belarusian chess player
- Slava Stetsko (1920–2003), Ukrainian politician
- Yaroslav Stetsko (1912–1986), Ukrainian politician
- Yuriy Stetsko (born 1981), Ukrainian freestyle skier
