= Shulman =

Shulman is an Ashkenazi Jewish surname that literally means "shul-man". A shul is another name for a synagogue, a Jewish house of worship, and the name was usually given to the head of the synagogue or the synagogue's rabbi. It can also appear as a result of double transliteration, to and from the Cyrillic alphabet, of the German surname "Schulmann".

== Notable people ==
- Alexandra Shulman (born 1957), editor of British Vogue
- Andrew Shulman (born 1960), English cellist and conductor
- Barry Shulman (born 1946), American poker player and CEO of the magazine Card Player
- Claire Shulman (1926–2020), American politician
- D. Geoffrey Shulman (1954-2012), Canadian dermatologist
- Daniel Shulman (disambiguation), several people
- David Shulman (1912–2004), American lexicographer
- Derek Shulman (born 1947), Scottish musician
- Douglas H. Shulman (born 1967), Commissioner of the IRS
- Eli Baruch Shulman (born 1959), rosh yeshiva at RIETS
- Eliezer Shulman (1923–2006), biblical scholar and historian
- Ekaterina Schulmann (born 1978), Russian political scientist
- Eyal Shulman (born 1987), Israeli basketball player
- Harry Shulman (1903–1955), dean of Yale Law School, 1954-55
- Holly Shulman, American reproductive health statistician
- Irving Shulman (1913–1995), American author and screenwriter
- Jack Shulman, American communist activist
- Jeff Shulman (born 1975), poker player and editor of Card Player magazine
- John Shulman (born 1966), basketball coach
- Julius Shulman (1910–2009), American photographer
- Lawrence Shulman (born 1937), dean of the University at Buffalo
- Lee Shulman (1938–2024), American educational psychologist
- Mark Shulman (author) (born 1962), American author and publisher
- Mark Shulman (rugby league) (1951–2022), Australian rugby player
- Marshall D. Shulman (1916–2007), American diplomat
- Max Shulman (1919–1988), American writer and humorist
- Michael Shulman (actor) (born 1981), American actor
- Michael Shulman (mathematician) (born 1980), American mathematician
- Michael Shulman (writer) (born 1973), American writer
- Milton Shulman (1913–2004), Canadian writer and broadcaster
- Morton Shulman (1925–2000), Canadian politician
- Naphtali Herz Shulman (died c. 1830), Russian Hebrew writer
- Nechama Shulman, birth name of Nechama Rivlin (1945–2019), Israeli researcher, science secretary, and First Lady of Israel
- Neville Shulman, English mountaineer and personal consultant to filmmaker Ridley Scott
- Nicola Shulman, English biographer
- Phil Shulman (born 1937), Scottish musician
- Ray Shulman (1949–2023), English musician
- Robert G. Shulman (1924–2026), American biophysicist
- Yury Shulman (born 1975), Belarusian chess grandmaster

== See also ==
- Schulman
