= Shulman (disambiguation) =

Shulman is a surname:

Shulman may also refer to:

- Shulmanu, a Mesopotamian god

== See also ==
- Schulman
