= Alexei Fedorov =

Belarusian chess grandmaster (born 1972)

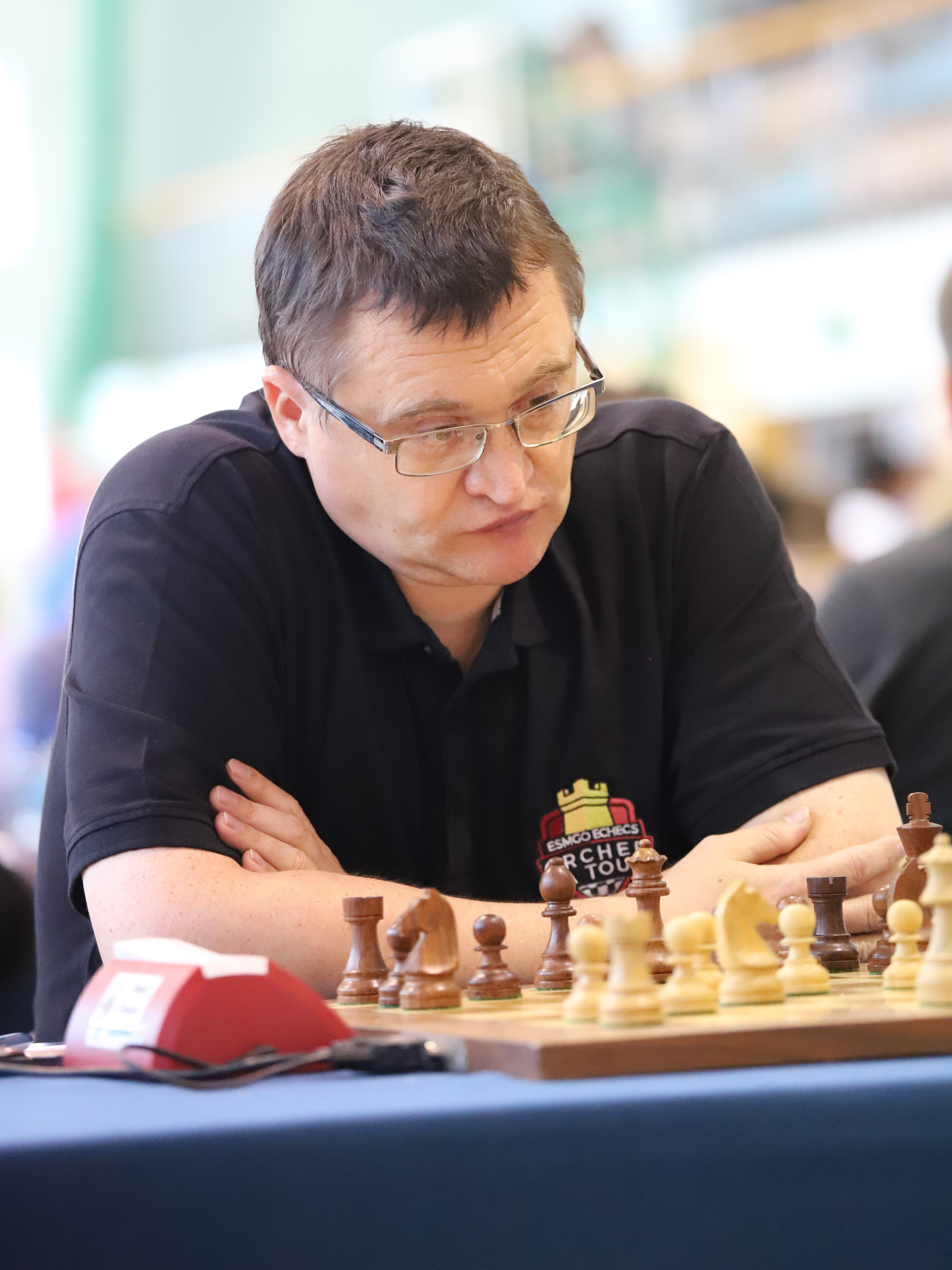
- Fedorov in 2019

Personal information
- Born: 5 August 1972 (age 53) Mogilev, Byelorussian SSR, Soviet Union

Chess career
- Country: Soviet Union → Russia; Belarus (since 1993)
- Title: Grandmaster (1995)
- Peak rating: 2684 (January 2000)
- Peak ranking: No. 14 (January 2000)

Alexei Dmitrievich Fedorov (Russian: Алексей Дмитриевич Фёдоров, Aleksey Dimitriyevich Fyodorov, Belarusian: Аляксей Фёдараў, Aliaksey Fyodarau; born 5 August 1972) is a Belarusian chess player. He was awarded the titles International Master in 1992 and Grandmaster in 1995 by FIDE.

Born in Mogilev, after the dissolution of the Soviet Union, he briefly played for Russia and from 1993 for the Belarusian Chess Federation.

Fedorov won the Belarusian Chess Championship in 1993, 1995, 2005 and 2008 and participated in seven Chess Olympiads (1994, 1998, 2000, 2002, 2004, 2006 and 2008) with a performance of 54.3% (+22=32-16). Fedorov competed in the FIDE World Championship in 1999, 2000 and 2002. In 1999 he was knocked out in the fourth round, while in 2000 and 2002 he was eliminated in the first.

== Selected tournament results ==
- Participated at the Corus chess tournament in 2001. Won by Garry Kasparov, Fedorov ended shared 10th place
- Shared first at Aeroflot Open, 2003 (third place on tie-break) with Aleksej Aleksandrov, Peter Svidler, and Viktor Bologan.
- First at the 4th Parsvnath International Open Chess Tournament in 2006 (with 9 points out of 10)
- Shared first at the Cappelle-la-Grande Open in 2013 (seventh on tiebreak) with Sanan Sjugirov, Parimarjan Negi, Maxim Rodshtein, Sergey Fedorchuk, Eric Hansen, Vlad-Cristian Jianu, and Yuri Vovk.
- First at the Georgy Agzamov Memorial in Tashkent in 2019
