= Konstantin Vygodchikov =

Belarusian Chess Master (1892-1941)

Konstantin Vygodchikov (Vigodchikov, Wygodchikoff; Russian: Константин Алексеевич Выгодчиков) (1892–1941) was a Belarusian chess master.

He won in the 3rd Belarusian Championship in 1926, and shared 1st with Abram Model and Vladislav Silich in the 4th BLR-ch in 1928.

In 1908-09, he lost a correspondence game to Alexander Alekhine. He shared first with Kliatsky (Kliatskin) at Moscow 1920 (Russian Olympiad, 1st Union National Congress, 1st USSR-ch, final B) and won a short match (play-off) against him (2:0). He tied for 11-13th at Petrograd (St. Petersburg) in the 2nd USSR Championship (Peter Romanovsky won).

He tied for 5-6th at Moscow 1928 (3rd Championship of Russia, Izmailov won). Konstantin Alekseyevich Vygodchikov lived in Smolensk where he taught his nephew Sergey Belavenets and Mikhail Yudovich. He gained the master title in 1929 after having come level with the young Mikhail Botvinnik in the preliminary round of the USSR Championships of that year. He took 4th at Odessa 1929 (6th USSR-ch, semifinal).

He took 6th at Moscow 1934 (4th Championship of Russia, Belavenets won), and tied for 11-12th at Leningrad (St. Petersburg) 1936 (All-Union Tournament of the 1st Category, A. Budo won).
