= Galina Archakova =

Soviet and Belarusian chess player (born 1939)

Personal information
- Born: 11 November 1939 (age 86) Khabarovsk, Russia

Chess career
- Country: Soviet Union; Belarus

Galina Archakova (Russian: Галина Акимовна Арчакова; born 11 November 1939 in Khabarovsk) is a Soviet and Belarusian chess player. She is a nine-time winner the Belarusian Women Chess Championship (1958, 1960, 1961, 1962, 1963, 1964, 1966, 1968, 1972).

== Biography ==
In the 1960s Galina Archakova was one of the leading chess players in Belarus. She won Belarusian Women Chess Championship nine times. Three times participated in the finals of the USSR Women's Chess Championship (1962 (December), 1965, 1966), in which the best result was shown in 1966, when she divided the 11-14th place. Six times represented the team of the Byelorussian SSR in the Soviet Team Chess Championship (1958-1963, 1972), in which in 1962 she won the second place in the individual competition, and in 1963 she was third in the team and in the individual competition. In 1969 Galina Archakova awarded the Master of Sports of the USSR title. Now she is also known as a chess trainer and a national category chess arbiter.

In 1961 Galina Archakova graduated from the Belarusian Polytechnic Institute (now the Belarusian National Technical University). From 1963 to 1994, she worked in Minsk at the Central Scientific Research Institute for the Integrated Use of Water Resources, and was a leading researcher. She holds the degree of Candidate of Sciences, and has scientific publications.
