= Alexey Suetin =

Russian chess grandmaster (1926–2001)

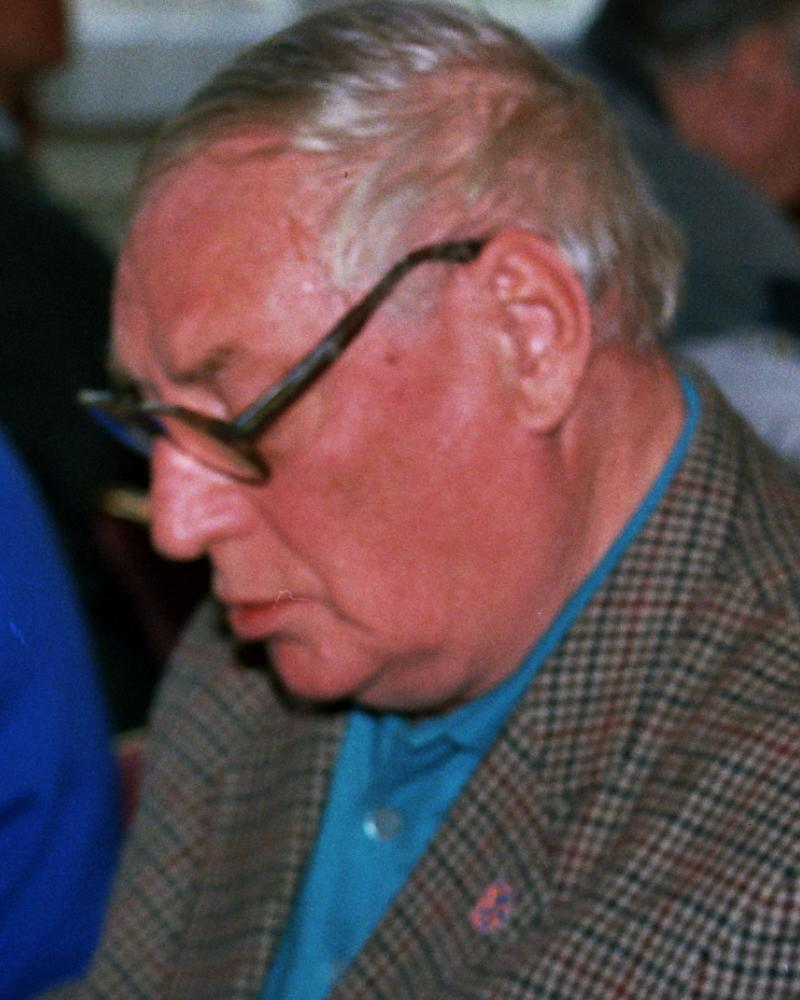
- Suetin in 1995

Personal information
- Born: Alexey Stepanovich Suetin; November 16, 1926 Kirovohrad, Ukrainian SSR, Soviet Union
- Died: September 10, 2001 (aged 74) Moscow, Russia

Chess career
- Country: Soviet Union
- Title: Grandmaster (1965)
- World Champion: World Senior Ch. 1996
- Peak rating: 2560 (January 1971)
- Peak ranking: No. 28 (July 1971)

Alexey Stepanovich Suetin (Russian: Алексе́й Степа́нович Суэ́тин; November 16, 1926 – September 10, 2001) was a Soviet and Russian chess grandmaster and author. He was the World Senior Chess Champion from 1996 to 1997.

== Biography ==
A resident of Minsk (in 1953-1968), a mechanical engineer by profession, he became an International Master in 1961 and a Grandmaster in 1965. His philosophy was always that "mastery is not enough; you must dare, take risks". It was an axiom that fashioned him into a competitive player.

His first major success came in 1955, when as a member of the Soviet team at the World Student Team Championships, he scored 80% and took individual and team gold medals.

As an active tournament player in the 1960s and 1970s, he achieved many fine results, including sharing or winning outright first place at Sarajevo 1965, Copenhagen 1965, Titovo Užice 1966, Hastings 1967/68, Havana 1969, Albena 1970, Kecskemét 1972, Brno 1975 (the inaugural Czech Open Championship – the title of Champion going to Vlastimil Hort on tie-break), Lublin 1976, and Dubna 1979. Third place finishes at Debrecen 1961 and Berlin (Lasker Memorial) 1968 were also noteworthy.

Suetin participated in seven USSR Championships from 1958 to 1966, his best finishes being 4th–6th in 1963 (behind Stein, Spassky and Kholmov) and 4th-6th in 1965 (behind Stein, Polugaevsky and Taimanov).

Until 1971, he served as a second and trainer to Tigran Petrosian for many of his most important matches, including his world championship victory in 1963. He was for many years Moscow's senior coach, overseeing the development of promising new talents, including Vassily Ivanchuk and Andrei Sokolov. Though less distinguished than before, his playing career stretched into the 1990s and beyond. He won the Hastings Challengers event of 1990/91, but was like Efim Geller, a chain-smoker, and found it difficult to adjust to the 1990 FIDE directive that banned smoking in tournament halls.

A renowned commentator on the game, he was from 1965 the correspondent for Pravda and his voice was often heard on Moscow radio and TV during the 1970s and 1980s.

As a veteran player, he won the World Senior Championship in 1996.

He wrote many chess books; principally those concerned with the middlegame or opening. These include: Modern Chess Opening Theory, Three Steps To Chess Mastery (a treatise which combines his earlier works, The Chess Player's Laboratory and The Path To Mastery), Plan Like A Grandmaster, A Contemporary Approach To The Middle-game, French Defence, The Complete Grunfeld and The Complete Spanish. His last book, Chess through the prism of time, was published in Moscow in 1998.

Alexey Suetin was married to Woman Grandmaster Kira Zvorykina and together they had a son Aleksandr, who was born in 1951. They lived in Belarus for some years and Suetin frequently competed in the national championship. Suetin was a six-time winner of the event (in 1953 – together with Vladimir Saigin; then in 1955, 1957, 1959, 1960, 1961). At the beginning of the 1960s Suetin divorced with Zvorykina and married for the second time.

He died aged 74 of a heart attack shortly after returning home from the Russian Senior Chess Championship.

== Notable games ==
- Suetin vs Tseshkovsky, English Opening A27, Kislovodsk 1972, 1-0

White builds pressure on Black's over-extended kingside, culminating in a deadly attack (33...Rxg7 34.Nf8+ and 35.Rxh6+).

- Suetin vs Korchnoi, Pirc Defense: Byrne Variation, Leningrad 1962

White catches Black's K in the centre with two exchange sacrifices, and Black is forced to go into a lost endgame.

- Suetin vs Donner, French Defense: Winawer, Capablanca Memorial, Havana, 1968

White opened up the Q-side, while Black didn't castle. In the final position, Black is faced with both Rb1 winning the pinned N on b6, as well as 25. Rxb6! because the Black rood must cover the mate on D6, and 24... Ne7 allows 25. Rd6.

- Suetin vs Gufeld, Tbilisi, 1969.

From a blocked position, White fights ingeniously for the win. Suetin won a prize for best endgame of the tournament for the domination of Q and Ps vs Q and B.
