= Albert Kapengut =

Belarusian-American chess player (born 1944)

Personal information
- Born: Albert Zinovievich Kapengut; 4 July 1944 (age 82) Kazan, Tatarstan, USSR

Chess career
- Country: Soviet Union (until 1991); Belarus (1991–2008); United States (since 2008)
- Title: International Master (1991)
- Peak rating: 2490 (July 1973)

Albert Zinovievich Kapengut (born 4 July 1944, in Kazan, Tatarstan) is a Soviet chess master (since 1962). A holder of the International Master title, he is best known as a respected teacher, theoretician, writer, and member of the successful student Olympiad teams of the 1960s.

When living in Belarus, Kapengut won championship of Minsk (1961) and several Belarus championships: 1962, 1968, 1969, 1970 (joint), 1976, 1977, and 1978. He finished 10th in his first Soviet Championship in 1971, ahead of many high-calibre masters such as Anatoly Lein, Efim Geller, Rafael Vaganian, and Vladimir Tukmakov.

He was the coach of GM Boris Gelfand and GM Yury Shulman among others. After 2000 Kapengut has been a permanent resident of the USA, and since 28 April 2008 he plays for the US Chess Federation.
