= Tamara Golovey =

Belarusian-American chess player (born 1943)

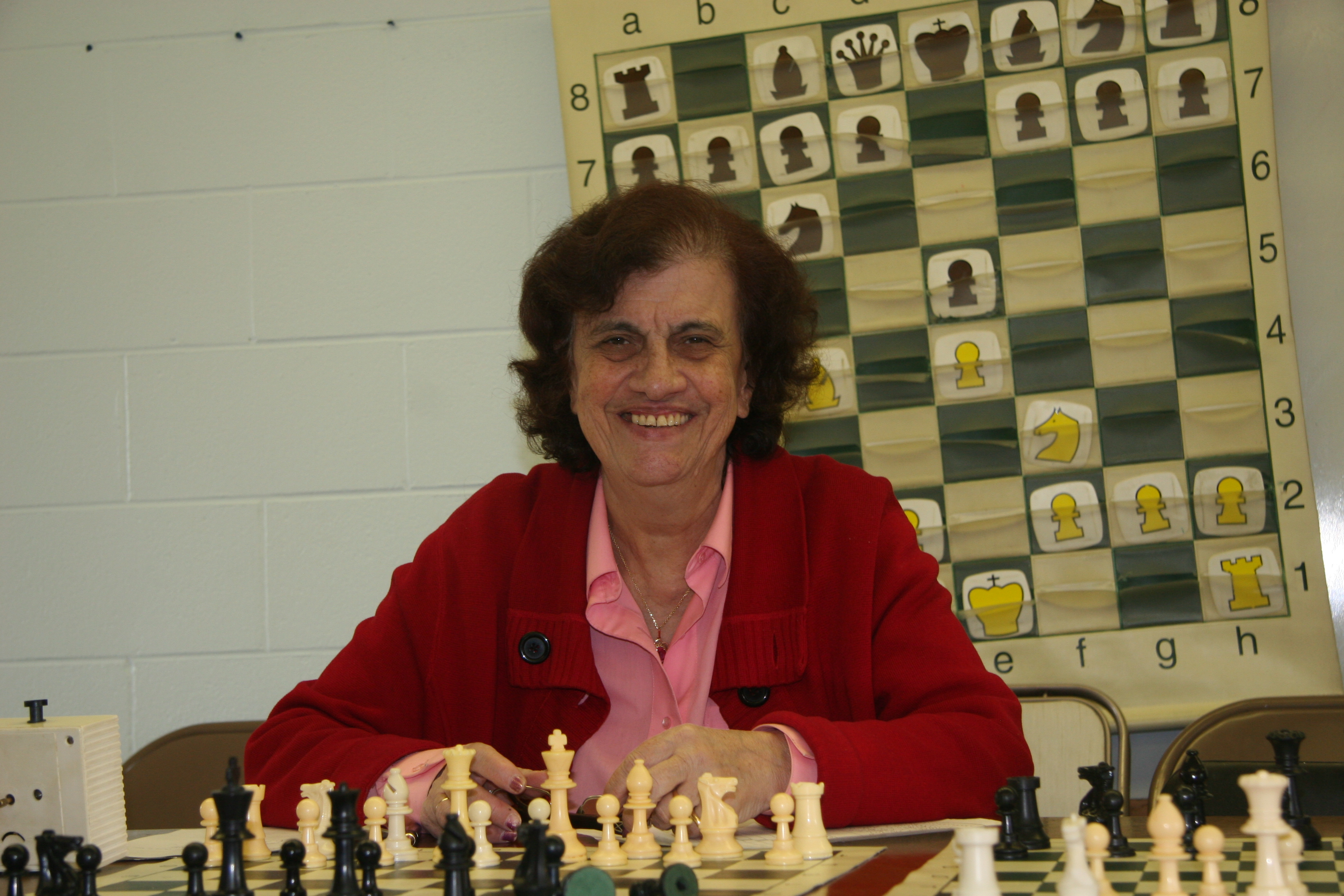
- Golovey in 2013

Personal information
- Native name: Тамара Ашэраўна Галавей (Belarusian); Тамара Ошеровна Головей (Russian)
- Born: September 19, 1943 (age 83) Uchqoʻrgʻon, Uzbek SSR, Soviet Union (now Uzbekistan)

Chess career
- Country: Soviet Union (until 1991); Belarus (1991–2008); United States (since 2008)
- Peak rating: 2245 (January 1990)

Tamara Asherawna Golovey (Note: Belarusian: Тамара Ашэраўна Галавей, romanized: Tamara Asherawna Halavyey; Russian: Тамара Ошеровна Головей, romanized: Tamara Osherovna Golovey) is a Belarusian-American chess player. She is an International Arbiter and the Merited Coach of the Republic of Belarus. Her United States Chess Federation rating (USCF) is 2322.

== Biography ==
Tamara was born in Uchqoʻrgʻon, Uzbek Soviet Socialist Republic, on September 19, 1943. She started studying chess at 12 under Abo Shagalovich (Minsk). Although she graduated from Belarusian Polytechnic Institute in 1965, she left the engineering career for chess. Since 1970 she has been the Chief Chess Coach of Minsk Children's Sports School of Olympic Reserve N 11.

She won Belarusian Women Chess Championship three times (1965, 1969 and 1976) and was a multiple finalist of the USSR Women's Chess Championships. From 1989 she became an International Arbiter. She was Chief Arbiter of many international tournaments.

Since 1999 Tamara has lived in the USA. She took third place together with Albert Chow (FIDE Master, USCF 2294) in 2000 Illinois Open Chess Championship and fourth in 2001 Illinois Open among men. She successfully continues to prepare children in Chicago for tournament play.

== Coach ==
"As a leading chess coach in the former Soviet Union, Tamara Golovey trained some of the top-ranked players in the world", such as Boris Gelfand, Grandmaster, double Olympic Champion, ranked third in the world in 1991 and winner of the Candidates Tournament in 2011, and Yury Shulman, Grandmaster, 2008 US Champion.

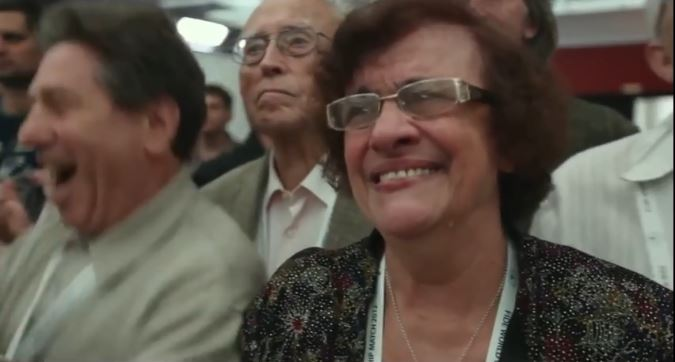
At the moment when B. Gelfand scored the first win of the match (May 2012)

Her students have included:

- Yuliya Levitan, Woman International Master, 1992 US Olympic team member (USCF 2228)
- Valeri Atlas, International Master, 1994 Olympic bronze medalist (USCF 2448)
- Eric Rosen, International Master (USCF 2413)
