= Kirill Stupak =

Belarusian chess grandmaster (born 1990)

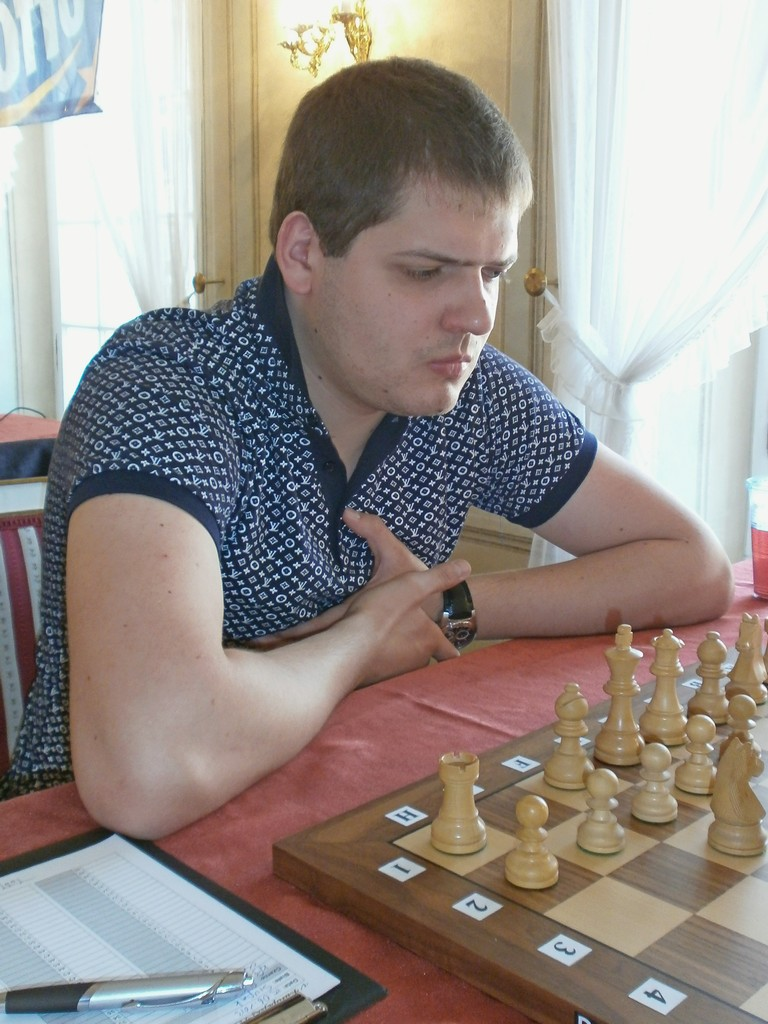
- Kiryl Stupak, Lublin 2013

Personal information
- Born: 16 March 1990 (age 36) Minsk, Byelorussian Soviet Socialist Republic (now Belarus)

Chess career
- Country: Belarus
- Title: Grandmaster (2011)
- FIDE rating: 2412 (July 2026)
- Peak rating: 2588 (December 2017)

Kirill Stupak is a Belarusian chess grandmaster.

== Chess career ==
He has represented his country in a number of chess olympiads, including 2010, 2012, 2014 and 2016.

He played in the Chess World Cup 2017, being defeated by Boris Gelfand in the first round.
