= Naphtali Herz Shulman =

Russian Hebrew author

- Born: Bikhov, Mogilev Governorate, Russian Empire
- Died: c. 1830; Amsterdam, The Netherlands
- Relatives: Kalman Schulman (nephew)
- Writing career
- Language: Hebrew

Naphtali Herz Shulman (Hebrew: נפתלי הרץ בן אברהם שולמן; died c. 1830) was a Russian Hebrew author, an early Maskilic author in Eastern Europe. He was born in Stary Bykhov, about 40 miles south of Shkov.

He was son of a rabbi and developed an interest in Maimonides' Guide to the Perplexed, which was "the first step in intellectual emancipation of East European maskilim from the fetters of tradition." In the 1790s during a stay in Vilna, Schulman challenged the traditional taboo on public study of the Guide. He presented lectures on the subject which aroused the indignation by some communal leaders, who protested to Vilna Gaon and urged him to ban the classes. The Gaon refused. The controversy foreshadowed future confrontations.

Inspired by the Berlin Haskalah, Schulman also focused on Hebrew grammar and philology which were neglected by East European rabbis. Vilna Gaon became aware of his studies and supposedly tested his grammatical skills. In these ways, Schulman challenged Jewish literary culture in Eastern Europe .

In 1797, Schulman settled in Shkov where he made his literary debut as an editor of a new edition of Mikveh yisra'el (The hope of Israel), a booklet by R. Manasseh Ben Israel of Amsterdam on the discovery of the ten lost tribes of Israel among the American Indians. Schulman recognized that the book could serve as a useful introduction to modern geography, thus introducing East European Jews to the New World and broadening the intellectual horizons.The book was a literary sensation for Jews in Eastern Europe. Schulman's intent was to use the book to argue for the legitimacy of knowledge originating from outside rabbinic tradition.

== Biography ==
Shulman was born in Bikhov, Mogilev Governorate, and later settled in Vilna, where he earned a livelihood from giving private lessons in wealthy homes.

He edited Benjamin Musaphia's Zekher rav (Shklov, 1797), with an index of the words to be found in the Bible, a translation of them into Yiddish, and grammatical notes. He also composed and published Shir ve-hallel (in Hebrew, Russian, and German; Vilna, 1806), a hymn sung by the Jews of Vilna on the birthday of the grand duchess Elizabeth Alexandrowna, daughter of Alexander I and Elizabeth Alexeievna.
