= Viktor Zheliandinov =

Soviet-Ukrainian chess master (1935–2021)

Personal information
- Full name: Viktor Savelievich Zheliandinov
- Born: 17 March 1935 Lyubertsy, Moscow Oblast, USSR
- Died: 24 July 2021 (aged 86)

Chess career
- Country: Soviet Union (until 1991); Ukraine
- Title: International Master (1999)
- Peak rating: 2425 (January 1978)

Viktor Savelievich Zheliandinov (Ukrainian: Віктор Савелійович Желяндинов, romanized: Viktor Saveliiovych Zheliandynov, 17 March 1935 – 24 July 2021) was a Soviet-Ukrainian chess player, International Master and coach. He was awarded the Master title in 1962. He was a Soviet Army Champion in 1966. Zheliandinov won Belarus championships in 1970. He finished =1st with Vlastimil Hort in Prague in 1966.

There are many international grandmasters and masters among Zheliandinov's apprentices. Among his students were such famous chess players as grandmasters Vassily Ivanchuk, Marta Litinskaya-Shul, Mateusz Bartel and Vitali Golod. Viktor Zheliandinov assisted the rise of former world champion Anatoly Karpov. Zheliandinov died on 24 July 2021 at the age of 86.
