= Solomon Rosenthal =

Lithuanian-Belarusian chess player (1890–1955)

Solomon (Shlomo) Konradovich Rosenthal (10 August 1890, in Vilnius, Lithuania – 18 November 1955, in Minsk, Belarusian SSR) was a Lithuanian–Belarusian chess master.

In the beginning of his career, before World War I, he tied for 6-7th in the Hamburg 1910 chess tournament (the 17th DSB Congress, Hauptturnier A, Gersz Rotlewi won), took 5th at Karlsruhe 1911, took 3rd at Munich 1911 (Quadrangular, Simon Alapin won), tied for 4-5th at St. Petersburg 1911 (Stepan Levitsky won), shared 2nd, behind Bernhard Gregory, at Breslau 1912 (the 18th DSB Congress, Hauptturnier A), took 2nd, behind Andreas Duhm, at Heidelberg 1913, and took 7th at St. Petersburg 1913 (Alexander Evensohn won).

He was the first Belarusian Champion, winning in 1924 and 1925. He took 4th, behind Konstantin Vygodchikov, Abram Model and Vladislav Silich, at Minsk 1928 (the 4th BLR-ch), shared 3rd at Moscow 1928 (Nikolai Grigoriev won), and took 5th at Odessa 1929 (the 6th USSR Chess Championship, quarter final). In 1930's he had to cut down on tournament play due to being busy with his medical work (he was a medical doctor).
