= Rakhil Eidelson =

Belarusian chess grandmaster

Personal information
- Born: 14 November 1958 (age 67)

Chess career
- Country: Belarus
- Title: Woman Grandmaster (1995)
- Peak rating: 2370 (January 1996)

Rakhil Solomonovna Eidelson (born 14 November 1958) is a Belarusian chess Woman Grandmaster.

She won the Belarusian Women's Chess Championship ten times (1980, 1985, 1987, 1989, 1993, 1995, 1997, 1998, 2003, and 2004). She played for Belarus in the Women's Chess Olympiad in 1994, 1998, 2000, and 2004. She is Belarus' oldest female grandmaster and she still participates actively in chess tournaments in Russia and Belarus.
