= Schulman family =

German noble family

Schulman
- Baltic German noble family
- Current region: Northern Europe (mainly Finland and Sweden)

This artice is about the Baltic German noble family. For other people of Jewish or German origin carrying the name, see Schulman

The Schulman family, also written Schulmann, Schuman, Schumann, Shulman, Sholman, Scholman and Koulumies, is a Baltic German noble family of German origin, registered among the Swedish and Finnish houses of nobility, first mentioned in 1495 on the island of Ösel.

== Etymology ==
Their reputed origins lie in East Frisia: the Schul- element of the name apparently originates from the German word "Schole" (meaning "shoal").

== History ==
From East Frisia, the family came to the Baltic as part of the Teutonic Order and is first mentioned in the 15th century. Continuous descent of the current family only goes back to 1495 with the mention of Toennis von Schulmann in Pöide.

Pöide Church is site of the grave of Heinrich von Schulmann, beheaded by the Danes in 1613. The gravestone in the church has him as a headless knight.

In the 17th century the family split into two branches, the existing one in Estonia and a new one in Sweden. The Swedish branch then developed the Finnish branch in the 18th century (see also Finland under Swedish rule).

The elder branch of the family resided in Estonia till 1939 when they resettled in the Wartegau in Germany. After World War II the few still remaining resettled in Germany and Canada.

== Nobility ==
The family was ennobled in Estonia, Livonia, Courland, Ösel, Sweden and Finland. Only the last two are still recognized today.

== Notable members ==
- Alex Schulman
