= Natalia Popova (chess player) =

Belarusian chess player (born 1976)

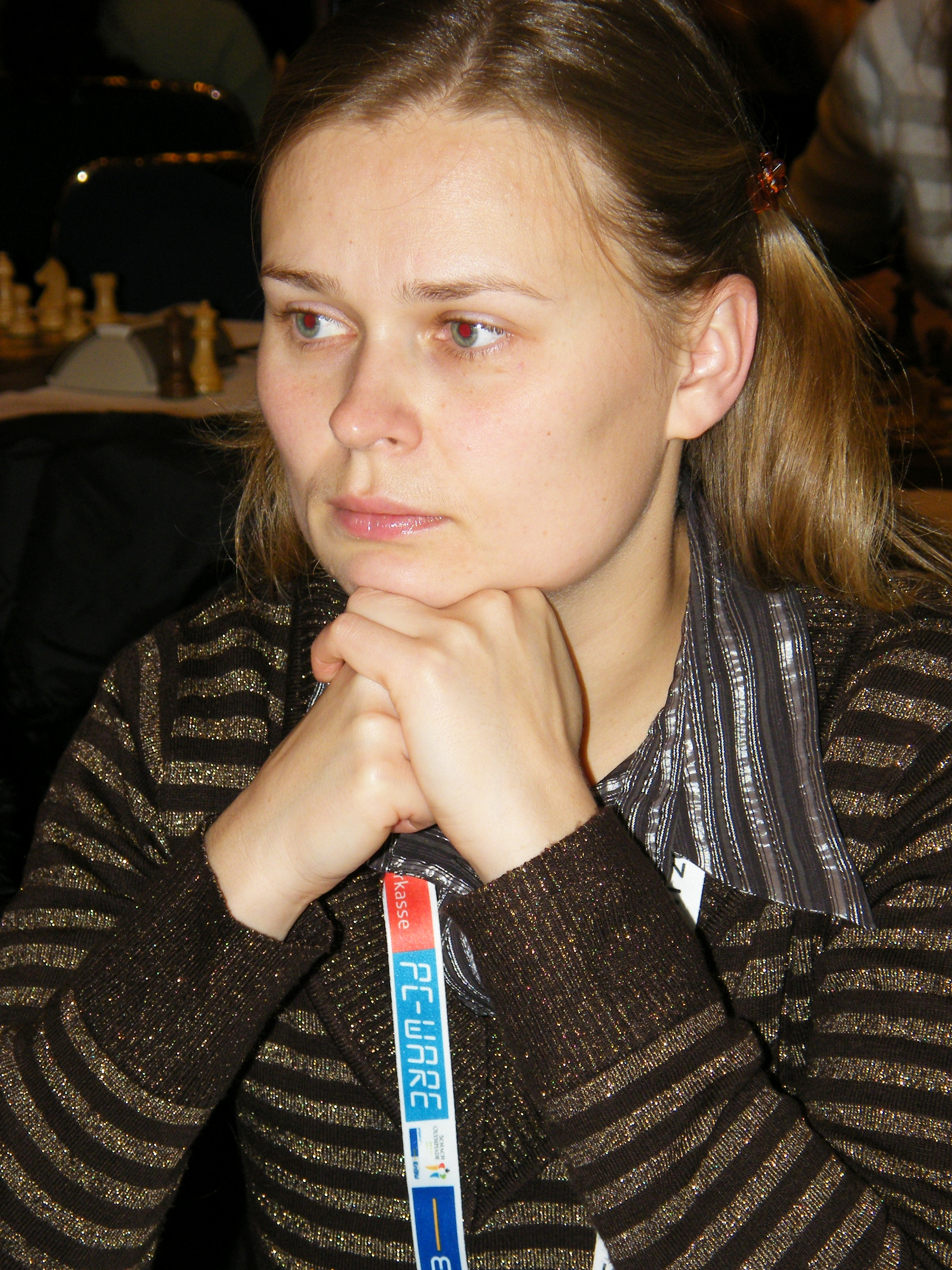
- Popova in 2008

Personal information
- Born: 28 November 1976 (age 49) Lotva, Mogilev Region, Belarus

Chess career
- Country: Belarus
- Title: Woman International Master (1999)
- Peak rating: 2347 (September 2011)

Natalia Valerievna Popova (Russian: Наталья Валерьевна Попова; born 28 November 1976) is a Belarusian chess player who holds the titles of Woman International Master (1999), International Arbiter (2017), and FIDE Trainer (2018). She is a five-time Belarusian Women's Chess Champion (1999, 2000, 2006, 2008, 2009).

== Biography ==
In 2000s Natalia Popova was one of the leading Belarusian chess players. She won five gold medals in Belarusian Women's Chess Championships: in 1999, 2000, 2006, 2008, and 2009. In 2017, in Riga Natalia Popova won international chess festival RTU Open B tournament.

Natalia Popova played for Belarus in the Women's Chess Olympiads:

- In 2000, at third board in the 34th Chess Olympiad (women) in Istanbul (+6, =6, −1),
- In 2002, at third board in the 35th Chess Olympiad (women) in Bled (+5, =4, −3),
- In 2004, at first reserve board in the 36th Chess Olympiad (women) in Calvià (+2, =6, −2),
- In 2006, at second board in the 37th Chess Olympiad (women) in Turin (+2, =5, −3),
- In 2008, at second board in the 38th Chess Olympiad (women) in Dresden (+4, =2, −3).

Natalia Popova played for Belarus in the European Team Chess Championship:

- In 2001, at second board in the 4th European Team Chess Championship (women) in León (+2, =3, −1).

In 1999, she was awarded the FIDE Woman International Master (WIM) title. In 2015, she became a FIDE Arbiter, and in 2017, she became an International Arbiter. From 2018 she is FIDE Trainer. Also Natalia Popova is member of FIDE Arbiters' Commission. She graduated from Maxim Tank Belarusian State Pedagogical University.
