= Nastassia Ziaziulkina =

Belarusian chess player (born 1995)

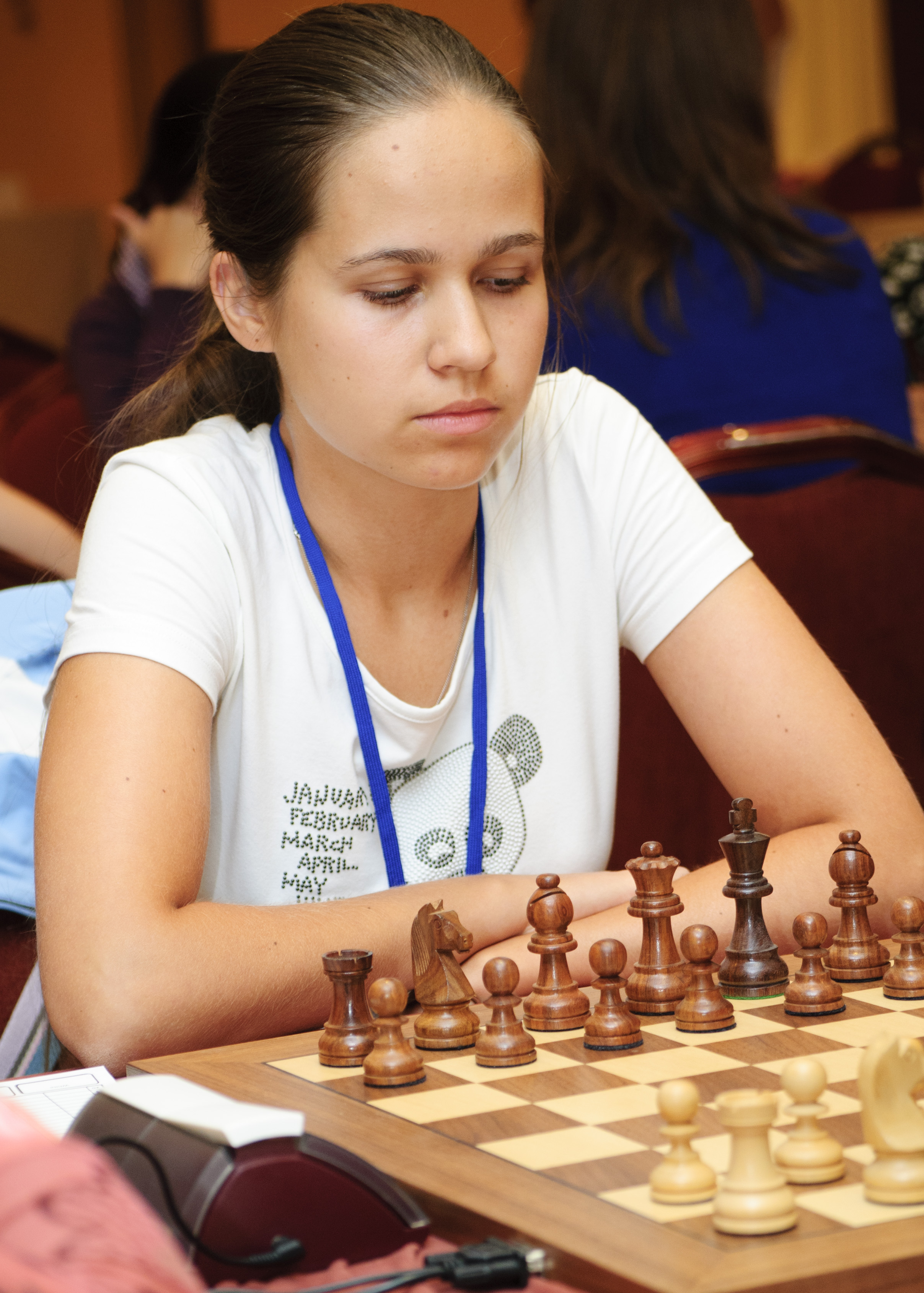

Personal information
- Born: Nastassia Alyakseeŭna Ziaziulkina; 6 October 1995 (age 30) Minsk, Belarus

Chess career
- Country: Belarus
- Title: International Master (2014); Woman Grandmaster (2012)
- Peak rating: 2431 (April 2015)

Nastassia Alyakseeŭna Ziaziulkina (Belarusian: Настасься Аляксееўна Зязюлькіна; born 6 October 1995) is a Belarusian chess player who holds the FIDE titles of International Master (IM) and Woman Grandmaster (WGM).

She won the Girls Under 16 section of the World Youth Chess Championships in 2010 and 2011, and the Girls Under 18 at the European Youth Chess Championships in 2013. Ziaziulkina also won the Women's Belarusian Chess Championship in 2010, 2012, 2013 and 2016. In 2014 and 2015 she competed in the absolute national championship, finishing respectively ninth and seventh.

Ziaziulkina competed in the Women's World Chess Championship in 2012 and 2017. She was eliminated in the first round on both occasions by former women's world champions Zhu Chen and Anna Ushenina respectively.
