= Aliaksandra Tarasenka =

Belarusian chess player (born 2006)

Personal information
- Born: July 6, 2006 (age 20) Brest, Belarus

Chess career
- Country: Belarus
- Title: Woman International Master (2025)
- Peak rating: 2267 (September 2025)

Aliaksandra Tarasenka is a Belarusian chess player.

== Chess career ==
In 2019, she won the Belarusian Women's Chess Championship.

In August 2024, she won the World Junior Girls Blitz Championship ahead of Veronika Shubenkova and Anna Shukhman.

In September 2025, she finished in third place behind winner Eline Roebers and runner-up Umida Omonova in the World Junior Blitz Championship.
