= Anna Sharevich =

Belarusian chess player (born 1985)

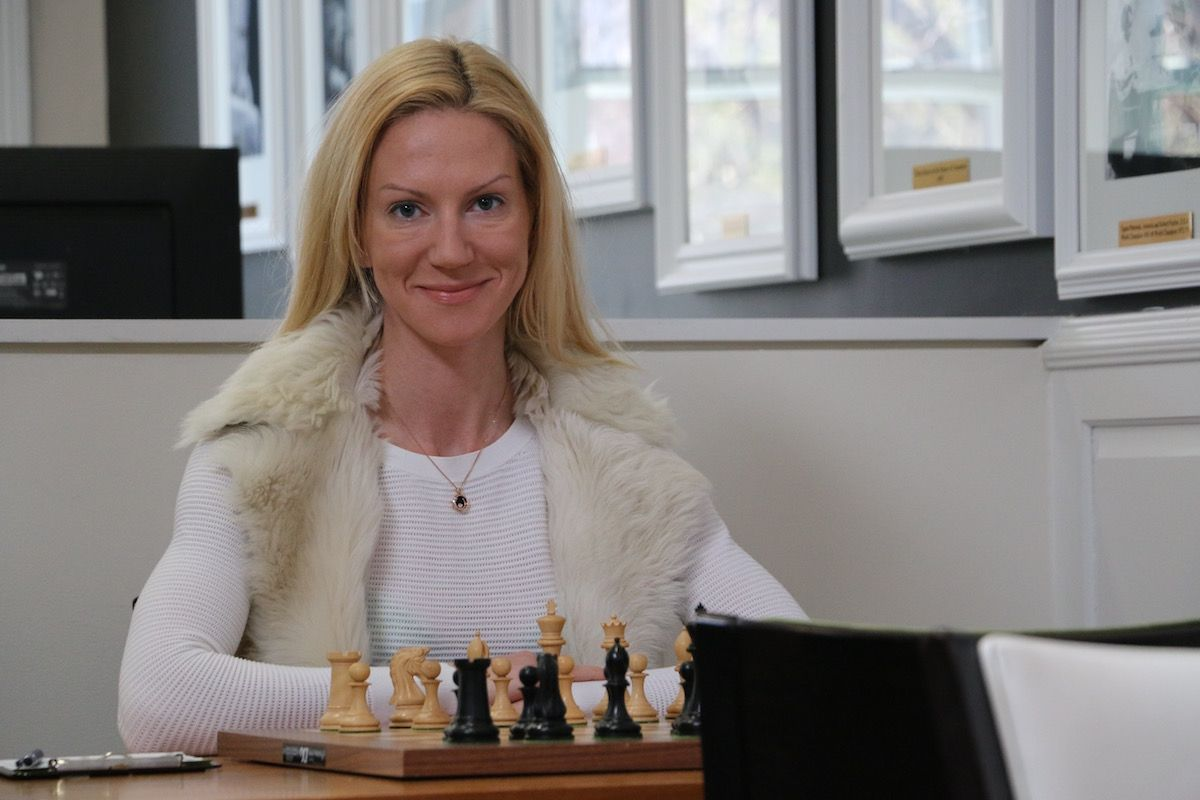
- Sharevich circa 2018

Personal information
- Born: December 18, 1985 (age 40) Brest, Byelorussian SSR, Soviet Union

Chess career
- Country: Belarus (until 2014); United States (since 2014)
- Title: Woman Grandmaster (2006)
- Peak rating: 2378 (May 2011)

Anna Sharevich (Belarusian: Ганна Шарэвіч; born December 18, 1985) is a Belarusian-American Woman Grandmaster (WGM) in chess. She won the Women's Belarusian Chess Championship in 2002, 2005, 2007 and 2011.

Sharevich played for team Belarus in the Women's Chess Olympiad in 2002, 2004, 2006, 2008, 2010 and 2012. In 2014, she transferred national federations from Belarus to United States. She was a member of team Saint Louis Arch Bishops, the 2014 champions of the United States Chess League.
