= Viacheslav Dydyshko =

Belarusian chess grandmaster (born 1949)

Personal information
- Born: 10 April 1949 (age 77)

Chess career
- Country: Belarus
- Title: Grandmaster (1995)
- FIDE rating: 2506 (July 2026)
- Peak rating: 2587 (July 2004)

Viacheslav Dydyshko (born 10 April 1949) is a Belarusian chess player who received the FIDE title of Grandmaster (GM) in 1995.

He won eleven times the Belarusian Chess Championship (from 1965 to 2006) and played for Belarus in the Chess Olympiads of 1994, 1996, 1998, 2000, 2002, 2004 and 2006. He won twice Baltic Chess Championship (1973 and 1974), and Rubinstein Memorial at Polanica-Zdrój 1983.

== Books ==
- Viacheslav Dydyshko, Logic of modern chess, Minsk 1989 (in Russian)

== Notable games ==
- Viacheslav Dydyshko vs Maia Chiburdanidze, URS-ch sf 1982, King's Indian Defense: Averbakh Variation, Flexible Defense (E73), 1-0
- Valerij Smirnov vs Viacheslav Dydyshko, Minsk 1994, King's Indian Defense: Orthodox Variation, Modern System (E97), 0-1
