= Schulhofer =

Schulhofer is a surname. Notable people with the surname include:

- Flint S. Schulhofer (1926–2006), American racehorse trainer
- Sam Schulhofer-Wohl, American economist
- Stephen Schulhofer (born 1942), American legal academic
