= Yury Shulman =

Belarusian-American chess grandmaster (born 1975)

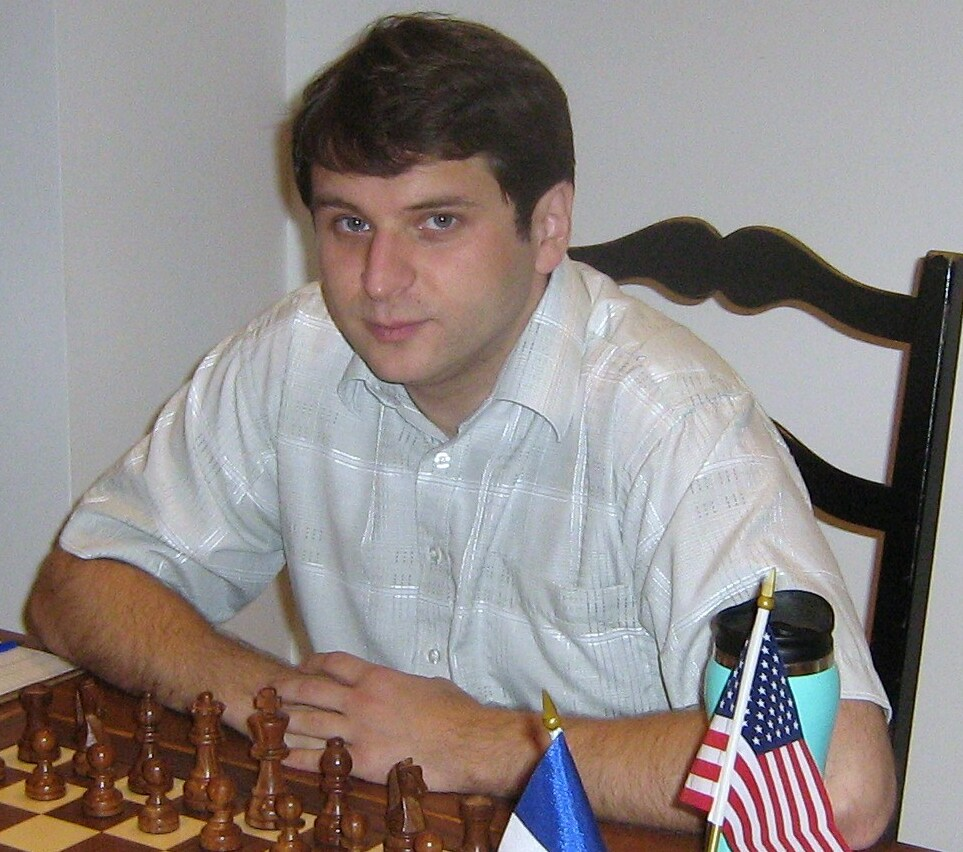
- Shulman in 2008

Personal information
- Native name: Юрый Шульман
- Born: April 29, 1975 (age 51) Minsk, Byelorussian SSR, Soviet Union
- Spouse: Viktorija Ni
- Children: 3

Chess career
- Country: Soviet Union → Belarus (before 2002); United States (after 2002)
- Title: Grandmaster (1995)
- FIDE rating: 2559 (October 2026)
- Peak rating: 2648 (July 2009)
- Peak ranking: No. 85 (July 2009)

Yury Markavich Shulman (Note: Belarusian: Юрый Маркавіч Шульман; Russian: Юрий Маркович Шульман, romanized: Yury Markovich Shulman) (born April 29, 1975) is a Belarusian-American chess player who holds the FIDE title of Grandmaster (GM).

== Chess career ==
Shulman was born in Minsk and started formal chess lessons with coach Tamara Golovey when he was six years old. He went on to study under International Master Albert Kapengut at age 12, and subsequently under the guidance of GM Boris Gelfand. He achieved his grandmaster title in 1995. Shulman moved to the United States in 1999 to attend University of Texas at Dallas, a three-time national championship college team.

Shulman completed undergraduate studies from the State Academy of Sports, Belarus, and has a bachelor's degree in computer science and an M.B.A. specializing in Finance from the University of Texas at Dallas.

Shulman has remained among the top U.S. chess players since moving to the country. He tied for first in the 2001 World Open, was runner up in the 2006 U.S. Chess Championship, and winner of the 2006 U.S. Open Chess Championship. Shulman tied for third place in the 2007 US Chess Championship and qualified for the 2007 FIDE world championship. On May 21, 2008, Shulman won the 2008 US Chess Championship. On May 25, 2010, he tied for first in the U.S. Chess Championship in St. Louis, losing in a rapid tie-break with GM Gata Kamsky, who became the US champion. He formerly played in the now defunct U.S. Chess League, for the strong St. Louis Archbishops, whose roster included Hikaru Nakamura.

== Chess career highlights ==
- 1994 - National Belarus champion, Top Sportsman Award, Republic of Belarus and member of the Belarusian Chess Olympic team from 1994–1998
- 1998 - National Belarus champion co-champion
- 1995 - European Junior Champion
- 1995 - Achieved International Grandmaster norm,
- 2000 - Co-Winner of US National Open, Texas State Champion, and winner of the Koltanowski Memorial
- 2001 - Ranked in top 100 chess players in the world, and Co-Winner of World Open
- 2002 - Co-Winner of American Open
- 2004 - Tied for 3rd place in the US Chess Championship
- 2005 - Illinois State Champion, co-winner of Millennium chess festival, and qualified to 1/16 in the World Cup (Khanty-Mansiysk, Siberia)
- 2006 - Winner of 107th US Open Chess Championship (Chicago, Illinois, US), U.S. Chess Championship runner-up (San Diego, California, US), and U.S. Women Olympic team coach (4th place) (Torino, Italy)
- 2006 - Co-Winner of the University of Texas at Dallas GM Invitational Tournament
- 2007 - Tied for 3rd place in the US Chess Championship and qualified for the 2007 FIDE world championship (Stillwater, Oklahoma, US)
- 2007 - Tied for 1st place in the 2007 Chicago Open (Chicago, Illinois, US). Vadim Milov won the blitz playoff game and the official title.
- 2008 - Won US Chess Championship
- 2010 - 1st Place tie in U.S. Chess Championship, taking 2nd in a tiebreaker game against Gata Kamsky.
- 2011 - 1st Place tie in U.S. Chess Championship, taking 2nd in a tiebreaker game against Gata Kamsky.

== Yury Shulman International Chess School ==
Shulman is the co-founder of the Yury Shulman International Chess School. Shulman and his co-founder Rishi Sethi use chess as a medium for philanthropic causes. In 2006 and 2007, this included community service visits to, and book drives for, Chicago public schools, and contributions of a portion of the proceeds from camps and tournaments to non-profit entities the world over. He now teaches chess in Barrington, IL at all of the schools and at his house.

== 'Chess Without Borders' volunteer organization ==
In May 2007, Shulman formally cofounded non-profit organization Chess Without Borders with Rishi Sethi through which to continue his volunteer efforts. He now lives in Barrington, Illinois teaching chess to the kids who go to school in district 220 and at his house.

== See also ==
- List of Jewish chess players

== Notes ==
Awards and achievements
Preceded by Alexander Shabalov	United States Chess Champion; 2008	Succeeded by Hikaru Nakamura
