= Daniel Shulman (disambiguation) =

Daniel Shulman may refer to:

- Dan Shulman (born 1969), Canadian sportscaster
- Daniel Shulman, a touring member of the band Garbage

== See also ==
- Daniel Schulman (disambiguation)
