= Daniel Schulman =

Daniel Schulman may refer to:

- Dan Schulman (born 1958), American businessperson
- Daniel Schulman (writer), American author and journalist
- Daniel Schulman (curator), American curator, formerly of the Art Institute of Chicago

== See also ==
- Joseph Daniel Schulman, American physician
- Daniel Shulman (disambiguation)
