= Mihail Nikitenko =

Belarusian chess grandmaster (born 2000)

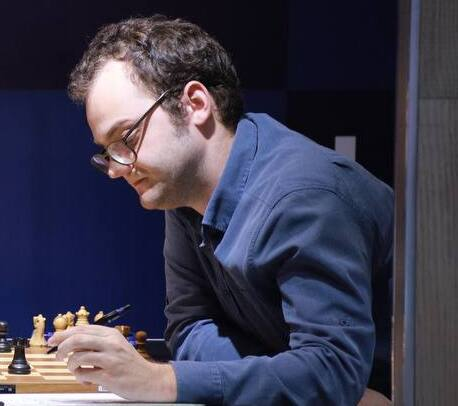
- Nikitenko in 2024

Personal information
- Born: March 28, 2000 (age 26) Minsk, Belarus

Chess career
- Country: Belarus
- Title: Grandmaster (2022)
- FIDE rating: 2430 (July 2026)
- Peak rating: 2540 (July 2023)

Mihail Igorevich Nikitenko is a Belarusian chess grandmaster.

== Chess career ==
He was awarded the Grandmaster title in 2022, after achieving his norms at the:

- Third Saturday Mix tournament in February 2021
- Serbia Open Masters tournament in July 2021
- President Cup tournament in November 2021

In December 2022, he won the CFSL Golden Jubilee Open with an undefeated 8.5/9, finishing two points ahead of runner-up Thejkumar M. S..

In October 2023, he tied for second place with Dmitry Bocharov in the Pavlodar Open 2023, ultimately being placed second after tiebreaks.
