= Aleksej Aleksandrov =

Belarusian chess grandmaster (born 1973)

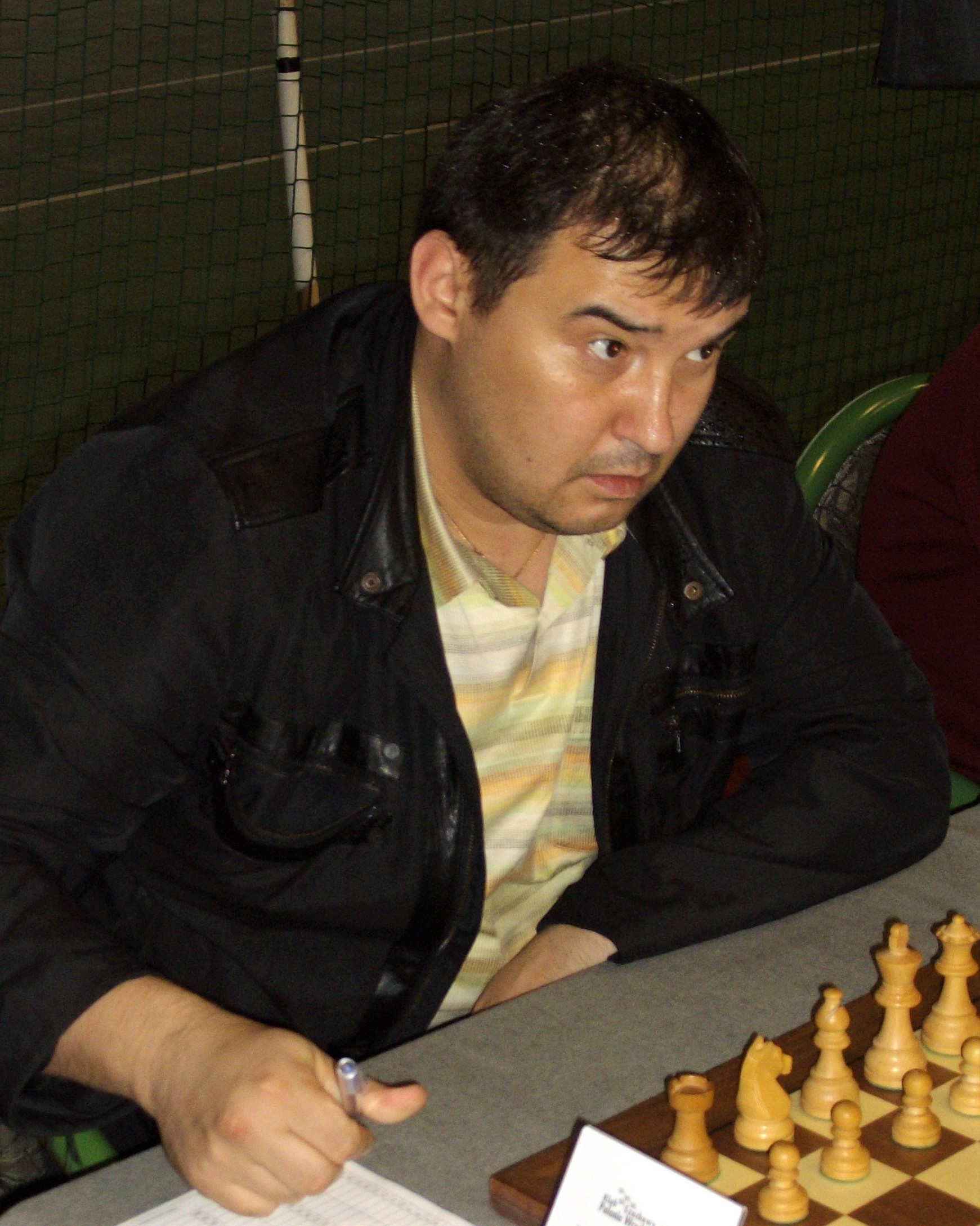
- Aleksej Aleksandrov, Wrocław 2009

Personal information
- Born: 11 May 1973 (age 53) Kobryn, Byelorussian SSR, Soviet Union

Chess career
- Country: Belarus
- Title: Grandmaster (1997)
- FIDE rating: 2449 (July 2026)
- Peak rating: 2679 (January 2004)
- Peak ranking: No. 18 (July 1997)

Aleksej Gennadyevich Aleksandrov (born 11 May 1973) is a Belarusian chess player. He was awarded the title Grandmaster by FIDE in 1997. Aleksandrov is a five-time Belarusian champion and played on the Belarusian national team at the Chess Olympiad, the World Team Chess Championship and the European Team Chess Championship. He competed in the FIDE World Championship in 1998, 1999, 2000 and 2004, and in the FIDE World Cup in 2017.

== Selected tournament results ==
- 1991: Victory at the USSR Junior Chess Championship
- 1992: Victory at the European Junior Chess Championship
- 1996: Victory at the Belarusian Chess Championship, Victory at Gistrup
- 1998: Victory at a tournament in Kstovo
- 2000: Second at European Individual Chess Championship
- 2000: Victory at the Petroff Memorial in St. Petersburg
- 2001: Victory at the 17th open at Bad Wörishofen
- 2002: Shared victory at the Aeroflot Open in Moscow
- 2003: Shared victory at the Aeroflot Open in Moscow
- 2005: Victory at Inautomarket Open in Minsk
- 2007: Victory at the Belarusian Chess Championship and at the European Rapid Chess Championship in Warsaw
- 2008: Shared victory at the President's Cup in Baku
- 2009: Victory at the Abu Dhabi Chess Festival
- 2009: Victory at the Al Saleh 8th International Open in Yemen
- 2011: Victory at the 3rd Orissa International GM Open Chess Tournament
- 2012: Victory at Mumbai
