= Schulhof =

Schulhof or Schulhoff is a German and a Yiddish surname meaning schoolyard or synagogal yard. Notable people with the surname include:

Schulhof:

- Lipót Schulhof (1847–1921), Hungarian astronomer
  - 2384 Schulhof, main-belt asteroid named for him
- Nathan Schulhof (born 1949), American businessman
- David Schulhof (born 1971), American music and entertainment executive

Schulhoff:

- Erwin Schulhoff (1894–1942), Czech composer and pianist
- Julius Schulhoff (1825–1898), Czech pianist and composer, musicologist, great-uncle of Erwin
- Courtney Schulhoff (born 1987)

== See also ==
- Flint S. Schulhofer (1926–2006), American racehorse trainer
