= Schulberg =

Schulberg (meaning "synagogue mountain") is a surname. Notable persons with that surname include:

- B. P. Schulberg (1892–1957), American film producer and film studio executive
- Budd Schulberg (1914–2009), American screenwriter and novelist
- Jay Schulberg (1939–2005), American advertising executive
