= Lanita Stetsko =

Belarusian chess player (born 1993)

Personal information
- Born: Lanita Igorevna Stetsko; 14 August 1993 (age 32) Minsk, Belarus

Chess career
- Country: Belarus
- Title: FIDE Master (2010); Woman Grandmaster (2015)
- FIDE rating: 2196 (July 2019)
- Peak rating: 2297 (November 2014)

Lanita Igorevna Stetsko (Russian: Ланита Игоревна Стецко; born 14 August 1993) is a Belarusian chess player who holds the title of Woman Grandmaster. She won the Belarusian Women's Chess Championship in 2015.

== Chess career ==
Multiple times winner of Belarusian girl's chess championships in different age groups: U10 (2003), U12 (2005), U14 (2007), U16 (2008), and U18 (2010).

In Belarusian women's chess championships Lanita Stetsko won gold (2015), two silver (2014, 2017) and two bronze (2009, 2010) medals.

In December 2016 in Chelyabinsk she won the International Women Chess Tournament.

Lanita Stetsko played for Belarus in the Women's Chess Olympiads:

- In 2010, at fourth board in the 39th Chess Olympiad (women) in Khanty-Mansiysk (+1, =3, -3),
- In 2012, at third board in the 40th Chess Olympiad (women) in Istanbul (+7, =2, -1),
- In 2014, at second board in the 41st Chess Olympiad (women) in Tromsø (+6, =2, -2),
- In 2016, at second board in the 42nd Chess Olympiad (women) in Baku (+4, =4, -1).

Lanita Stetsko played for Belarus in the European Team Chess Championships:

- In 2013, at second board in the 10th European Team Chess Championship (women) in Warsaw (+3, =4, -2).

In 2013, she was awarded the FIDE Woman International Master (WIM) title and received the FIDE Woman Grandmaster (WGM) title two years later.

In 2015, she graduated from the Belarusian State University Business and Management Technology Institute.
