= Schulman =

Schulman is a surname, usually that of a person with German or Jewish family background. Some well-known people with this name are:

- The Schulman family, a Baltic German and Swedish noble family now mainly found in Finland and Canada
  - Alex Schulman, Swedish journalist, blogger, radio and television personality
  - Allan Schulman, Swedish journalist and television producer
- Ari Schulman, American journalist and editor of The New Atlantis
- Arnold Schulman, American writer
- Dan Schulman (born 1958), American businessman, CEO of PayPal
- Daniel Schulman (disambiguation), several people
- Dennis Schulman, Rabbi, democratic congressional candidate for NJ 5th district
- Eric Schulman, American football coach
- Ekaterina Schulmann, Russian political scientist
- Frank Schulman, Unitarian Universalist minister, theologian, and author
- Kalman Schulman, Lithuanian writer and translator
- J. Neil Schulman, American author, journalist, and filmmaker
- Lawrence Schulman, music producer, critic, and translator
- Leonard Schulman, professor of computer science
- Mark Schulman, American musician and corporate speaker
- Roger S. H. Schulman, American film and television screenwriter and producer
- Sarah Schulman, writer and activist
- Susan H. Schulman, American theatre director
- Tom Schulman, American screenwriter (born 1950)

== See also ==
- Shulman
- Schulmann
