= Mikhail Yudovich =

Russian chess player, journalist, and writer

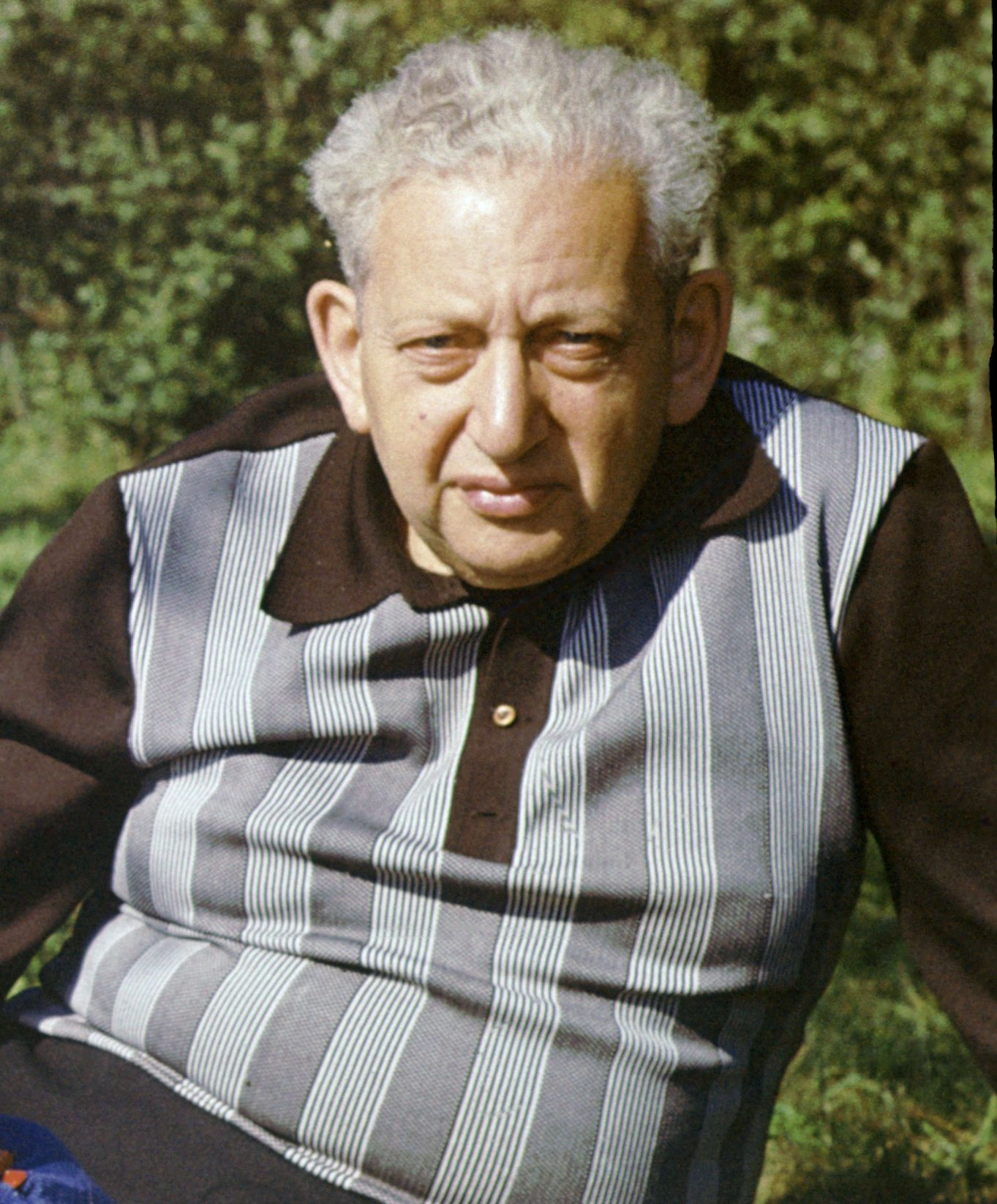
- Born: 8 June 1911; Roslavl
- Died: 19 September 1987 (aged 76)
- Resting place: Vagankovo Cemetery
- Occupation: Journalist, chess player, Grandmaster
- Language: Russian language
- Notable awards: Master of Sport of USSR in Chess (1931); International Master (1950); International Correspondence Chess Master (1961); International Correspondence Chess Grandmaster (1972)

Mikhail Mikhailovich Yudovich (surname also spelled as I︠U︡dovich, Judovič, and Ûdovič, 8 June 1911 in Roslavl – 19 September 1987 in Moscow) was a Soviet chess master, journalist, and writer.

== Chess career ==
In 1930, Yudovich tied for 5–9th in the Moscow Championship. In 1931, he took 4th in the same event, and shared 3rd in the 7th USSR Championship in Moscow (Mikhail Botvinnik won). He was the Soviet Correspondence Champion in 1966.

Yudovich was awarded the titles of International Master (IM) in 1950, International Master of Correspondence Chess (IMC) in 1961, and Grandmaster of Correspondence Chess (GMC) in 1973.

== Selected publications ==
- Kotov, Aleksandr Aleksandrovich; Yudovich, Mikhail (1958). The Soviet School of Chess. Translated by Stoklitsky, Leonard. Moscow: Foreign Languages Pub. House. OCLC 560550303. Republished in 2001: ISBN 978-0-89875-415-5
- План в шахматной партии [Planning in Chess] (in Russian). Moskva: Fizkulʹtura i sport. 1982. OCLC 10513333.
- Spanish without--a6. New York: Collier Books. 1986. ISBN 978-0-89875-415-5. OCLC 12949702.
- Garri Kasparov (His career in Chess). Moscow: Raduga Publishers. 1988. ISBN 978-5-05-001722-2. OCLC 1412107180.
- The Gambit. Translated by Zilbert, Oleg. Moscow: Planeta Publishers. 1989. ISBN 978-5-85250-220-9. OCLC 22181108 – via Internet Archive.
