= Boris Gelfand =

Israeli chess grandmaster (born 1968)

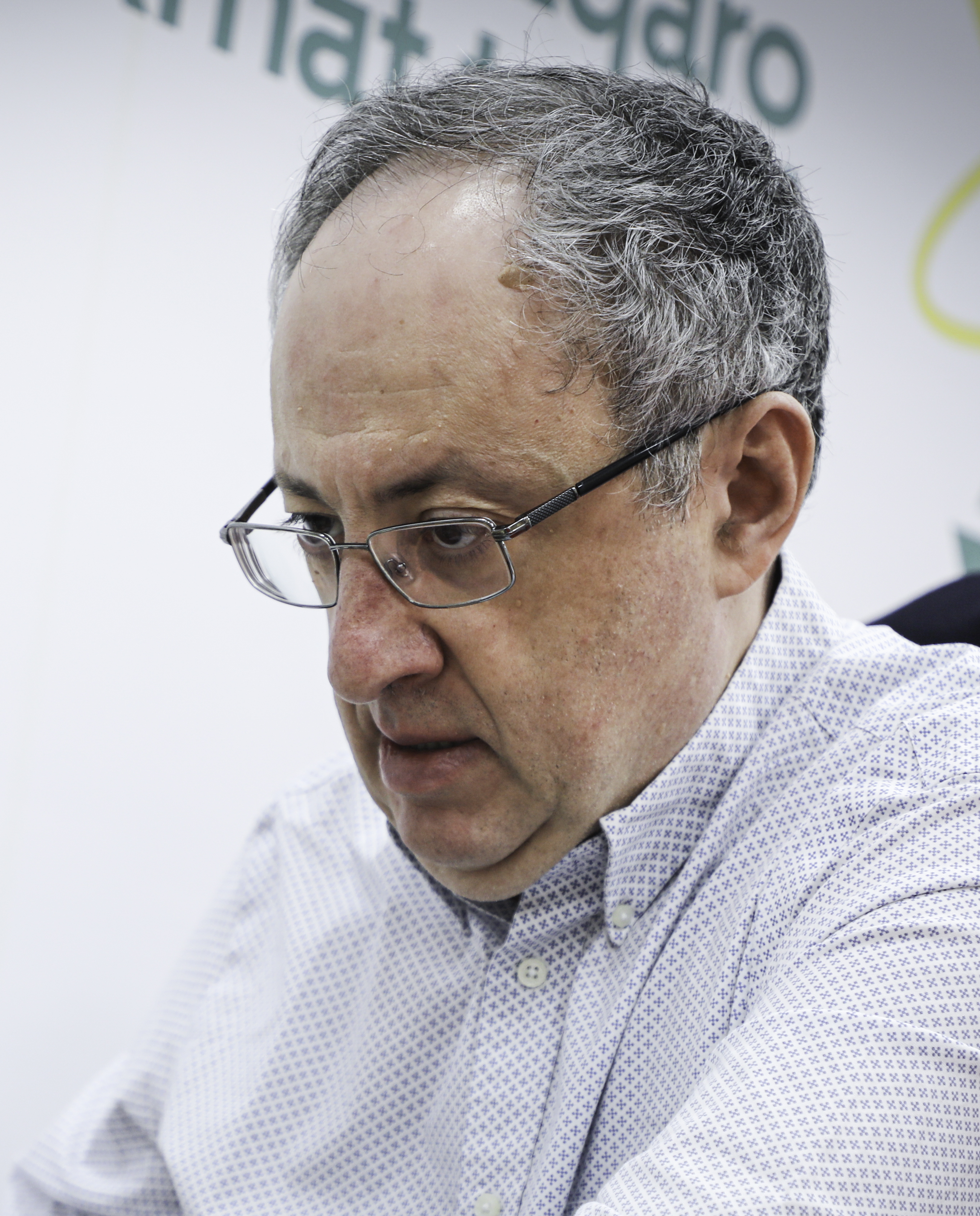
- Gelfand in 2026

Personal information
- Born: Boris Abramovich Gelfand; 24 June 1968 (age 58) Minsk, Byelorussian SSR, Soviet Union
- Spouse: Maya Gelfand

Chess career
- Country: Soviet Union (until 1991); Belarus (1991–1999); Israel (since 1999)
- Title: Grandmaster (1989)
- FIDE rating: 2640 (November 2026)
- Peak rating: 2777 (November 2013)
- Ranking: No. 79 (November 2026)
- Peak ranking: No. 3 (July 1990)

Boris Abramovich Gelfand (Note: Hebrew: בוריס אברמוביץ' גלפנד, romanized: Buris Avramuvich Galfand.; Belarusian: Барыс Абрамавіч Гельфанд, romanized: Barys Abramavič Heĺfand.; Russian: Борис Абрамович Гельфанд, romanized: Boris Abramovich Gel'fand.) (born 24 June 1968) is a Belarusian and Israeli chess grandmaster.

A six-time World Championship candidate (1991, 1994–95, 2002, 2007, 2011, 2013), he won the Chess World Cup 2009 and the 2011 Candidates Tournament, making him challenger for the World Chess Championship 2012. Although the match with defending champion Viswanathan Anand finished level at 6–6, Gelfand lost the deciding rapidplay tiebreak by 2½–1½.

Gelfand has won major tournaments at Wijk aan Zee, Tilburg, Moscow, Linares and Dos Hermanas. He has competed in eleven Chess Olympiads and held a place within the top 30 players ranked by FIDE from January 1990 to October 2017.

== Early years ==
Boris Gelfand was born in Minsk, in the Byelorussian Soviet Socialist Republic, on 24 June 1968 to Belarusian Jewish parents. His parents, Abram and Nella, were engineers. His father bought him a book about chess, Journey to the Chess Kingdom, by Averbakh and Beilin, when he was five years old.

Recognised as a talent, Gelfand's first coach from 1974 to 1979 was Eduard Zelkind. Soon after he studied under Tamara Golovey for two years and IM Albert Kapengut for twelve. In 1980–83, he attended the Tigran Petrosian School. Early successes included winning the Sokolsky Memorial in 1983 and consecutive Belarusian Chess Championships in 1984 and 1985. In 1985 he won the USSR Junior Championship scoring 9/11 and came second to Yury Balashov in the 1986 Minsk International.

In his first appearance on the FIDE rating list in July 1987, Gelfand immediately almost reached the top 100. He became European Junior Champion in 1987, shared second at the USSR Young Masters held in Uzhgorod and shared sixth place at a USSR Championship qualifier event in Sverdlovsk in 1987 with 10/17. Gelfand's successes saw him ranked in the world's top 40 players in July 1988. After sharing first place in the USSR Young Masters tournament of 1988 in Vilnius and the OHRA B Group in Amsterdam, he came second in the World Junior Championship to Joël Lautier on tiebreaks and shared first with Sergey Dolmatov at the Klaipeda USSR Championship qualifier. Gelfand jointly won the European Junior title with Alexey Dreev in December 1988, won the Barcza Memorial held in Debrecen, Hungary, with 7/10 and led the Belarus team to third place in the USSR Juniors Team Championship at Kramatorsk.

== Rising star ==
In Gelfand's first appearance at the USSR Championship held in Odessa in 1989, he shared second place with Alexander Beliavsky, Dolmatov and Vereslav Eingorn, earning a prize for "greatest amount of material sacrificed in the course of a tournament". Soon after, he won the Palma de Mallorca Open with 7½/9. He was awarded the title Grandmaster by FIDE in 1989.

He received invitations to major tournaments in 1990, placing second behind Garry Kasparov with 7½/11 in Linares and Dortmund, sharing first with Vassily Ivanchuk in the Manila Interzonal and third at Tilburg. At the Candidates Matches in early 1991, Gelfand defeated Predrag Nikolic 5½-4½ but was beaten in the next round by Nigel Short 3-5. Despite the disappointment, Gelfand claimed first place at Belgrade with 7½/11 and shared second place with Kasparov at Reggio Emilia, half a point behind Viswanathan Anand. He shared first place with Valery Salov at Wijk aan Zee in 1992, shared second place at Munich, lost in the final of Tilburg knockout to Michael Adams and shared first with Anand at the Alekhine Memorial held in Moscow.

A solid second place at Munich in 1993 preceded his biggest tournament win to this point, winning the Biel Interzonal with a score of 9/13, earning a spot in the 1994 Candidates Matches. Gelfand went on to defeat Adams 5-3 in the quarter-finals and Vladimir Kramnik 4½-3½ in the semi-finals, before losing to Anatoly Karpov in the Candidates Final 6-3 in 1995.

Gelfand remained ever-present in the world's top 20 players, winning the 1994 editions of Dos Hermanas and Cap d'Agde, Belgrade in 1995, shared first at Tilburg and Vienna in 1996, finished third at Dortmund and shared second place at Groningen. He came third in a strong Biel tournament and second at the Rubinstein Memorial held in Polanica Zdroj. Gelfand's best result at the FIDE Knockout World Championships came in 1997, defeating Joël Lautier (4-2), Vladislav Tkachiev (3½-2½) and Dreev (2.5-1.5) before being knocked out in the semi-finals by eventual tournament winner Anand (1½-½).

In 1998, Gelfand won the Rubinstein Memorial, lost the Cap d'Agde knockout tournament final against Karpov after running out of time in the decisive tiebreak blitz game while having a winning position, won the 1999 edition of Sigeman & Co held in Malmö and the Rubinstein Memorial in 2000. In 2001, Gelfand shared first place in the rapid section of the Melody Amber tournament (taking first place outright the next year) and came third in Astana. The next year, he shared first at the NAO Masters in Cannes, won the Cap d'Agde KO and took part in the "Russia vs World" rapid match, scoring 6/10 for the winning World team. He played in Dortmund, which was the Candidate Tournament for the Classical World Chess Championship 2004, but only managed to finish in third place in the preliminary group, so didn't progress to the knockout stages.

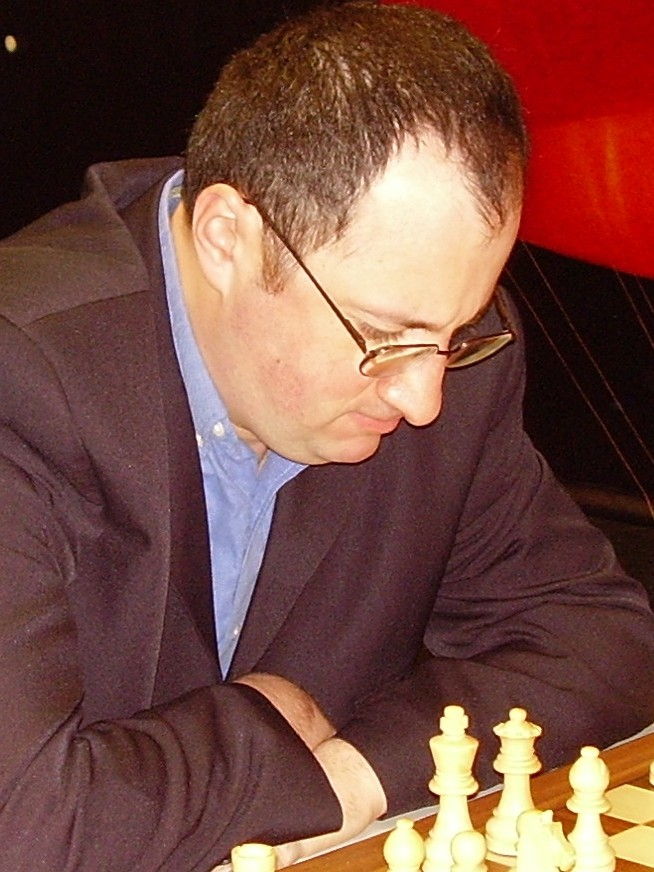
Corus Chess 2006

In 2003, he shared third place at Enghien and in 2004 won at Pamplona. Gelfand shared first in the Bermuda Invitational and Biel in 2005. He also finished in sixth place at the Chess World Cup 2005, earning a place in the 2007 Candidates Matches. In 2006, Gelfand shared fifth place with Sergey Karjakin scoring 7/13 at Corus and shared third place at Dortmund.

Gelfand won his Candidates matches against Rustam Kasimdzhanov 5½-3½ and Gata Kamsky 3½-1½, to qualify for the Championship tournament, held in Mexico City. Despite being ranked seventh in the World Chess Championship 2007 by FIDE rating, Gelfand caused an upset in finishing joint second (third on tiebreak) with Vladimir Kramnik, a point behind Viswanathan Anand. He also drew a match with David Navara 2-2, reached the semi-finals of the ACP Rapid Cup in Odessa, shared first place with Shirov, Ivan Sokolov and Fridman at the Calatrava rapid and shared third place at the Tal Memorial. He competed for Israel at the 2009 Maccabiah Games in Israel.

== World Championship 2012 ==
In the Chess World Cup 2009, Gelfand was the top seed, and defeated Judit Polgár, reigning World Junior Champion Maxime Vachier-Lagrave, Dmitry Jakovenko, and Sergey Karjakin to reach the final. He then faced former FIDE World Champion Ruslan Ponomariov for the championship, and won the match 7–5 in a playoff. By winning the Chess World Cup 2009, Gelfand qualified for the World Chess Championship 2012 Candidates Tournament.

In May 2011, Gelfand participated in the Candidates Matches in Kazan, Russia where he was seeded fourth. In the quarterfinals, he won a complex struggle on the black side of the Najdorf Defense in game three to defeat Shakhriyar Mamedyarov 2½–1½ and advance to the semifinals, where he faced American Gata Kamsky. After splitting the first four games 2–2, Kamsky won game three in the rapid playoff to go ahead 2–1, forcing Gelfand to win with black in the final rapid game in order to avoid elimination. Gelfand was up to the task, and then won the blitz playoff 2–0 to advance to the final. In the final, he faced Alexander Grischuk. After drawing the first five games, Gelfand won the sixth and final game on the white side of a Grünfeld Defence to win the match and the tournament 3½–2½.

As winner of the Candidates Tournament, Gelfand faced Anand for the 2012 World Championship. Gelfand's victory in game seven gave him the lead in the match, but he lost game 8 in a 17-move miniature, the shortest decisive game in World Championship history. The match after its conclusion was level at 6 points each, but Anand won the rapid playoff 2½–1½ to retain the title.

== Career after Moscow ==
Soon after the match, Gelfand shared first place with Veselin Topalov and Mamedyarov at the FIDE Grand Prix event held in London, with a last round win over Kasimdzhanov, scoring 7/11. He played in the 2013 Candidates Tournament, which took place in London, from 15 March to 1 April. He finished fifth, with 6½/14.

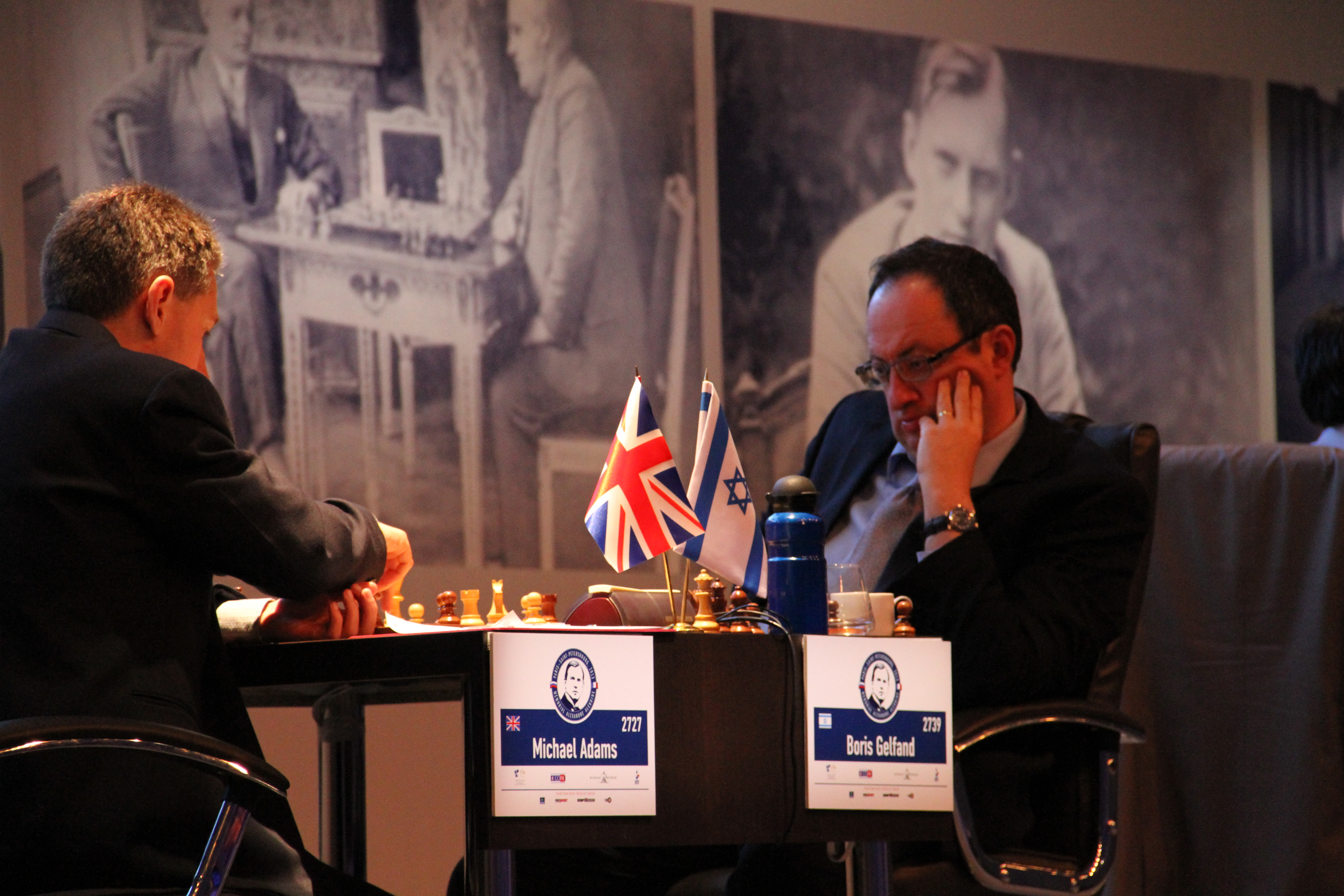
Gelfand-Adams, Alekhine Memorial 2013

In the 2013 Alekhine Memorial tournament, held from 20 April to 1 May, Gelfand shared first place with Aronian, who edged him out on the second tiebreak (number of wins). He scored 5½/9.

In June 2013, Gelfand won the Tal Memorial beating Alexander Morozevich, Fabiano Caruana and Hikaru Nakamura, scoring 6/9, half a point ahead of Magnus Carlsen. He gained 18 rating points and achieved his then highest FIDE rating of 2773. Gelfand bounced back from a fourth-round exit from the World Cup to Maxime Vachier-Lagrave by sharing first with Caruana in the final FIDE Grand Prix in Paris. He gained 11.9 rating points and again achieved a record personal rating of 2777. He finished fourth in the Grand Prix overall standings with 325 points missing out on a Candidates place due to his weak results in the Tashkent and Beijing events. He shared first with Caruana at the next FIDE Grand Prix event held in Baku.

== Team results ==
=== Chess Olympiads ===
Gelfand appeared in a total of eleven Chess Olympiads, representing the Soviet Union once in 1990, Belarus twice in 1994 and 1996, and Israel eight times from 2000–14. He has scored a total of 62½ points from 105 games (+26 =73 -6).

Olympiad	Individual result	Team result
Novi Sad 1990	6/9 (10th)	Gold
Moscow 1994	6/11 (45th)	12th
Yerevan 1996	6/10 (24th)	33rd
Istanbul 2000	7/11 (18th)	5th
Bled 2002	5/8	9th
Calvia 2004	6/11 (43rd)	5th
Turin 2006	5/9 (46th)	4th
Dresden 2008	7½/10 (Silver)	Silver
Khanty-Mansiysk 2010	4½/9 (19th)	Bronze
Istanbul 2012	4½/8 (15th)	26th
Tromso 2014	5/9 (22nd)	9th

=== Other international team results ===
Along with Chess Olympiads, Gelfand has competed twice at the invitational World Team Chess Championship (Israel), five times in European Team Chess Championship (Soviet Union 1989, Israel 1999-2005) and the Soviet Team Championship once (Belarus), winning a team gold and two team silvers in the ETCC:

Team Event	Individual result	Team result
1986 Soviet Team Championship	6/9	7th
1989 European Team Championship	4/6 (8th)	Gold
1999 European Team Championship	2½/7 (32nd)	7th
2001 European Team Championship	5/8 (4th)	6th
2003 European Team Championship	5½/9 (8th)	Silver
2005 European Team Championship	4½/8 (12th)	Silver
2005 World Team Championship	3½/7 (5th)	6th
2010 World Team Championship	3/7 (6th)	7th

== Personal life ==
In 1998, Gelfand emigrated to Israel and settled in Rishon LeZion, where he became Israel's top ranking chess player. He is married to Maya. He has two children, a daughter and a son. He is a football fan and is a fan of FC Barcelona.

== Playing style ==
I’ve tried to learn from all players but, no doubt, I was most impressed by Yury Razuvaev and Valery Myrachvery’s "Akiba Rubinstein"...The striving to play deeply in the opening, and the so-called "long plan", that is when a game’s played from the beginning to the end in one key… That’s what I like in chess, and it comes from Akiba.

— Boris Gelfand, Crestbook interview, Part One.

Gelfand is noted for his strong positional awareness and precise strategic play. In Gelfand's autobiography My Most Memorable Games, Kramnik wrote in the preface, "He is not only - and this is accessible only to a few - a highly universal player, capable of playing equally well in the most varied types of positions...This inexorable consistency in the realisation of his strategic conceptions is, in my view, the main trait of Boris Gelfand the chess player." Jacob Aagaard commented "But Gelfand is not a natural attacker; instead he is a deep strategic player who likes to get into the logic of a position - and to keep control".

Gelfand is noted for opening as White with 1.d4 and as a specialist in the Najdorf Sicilian, Petroff Defence, Slav Defense, and King's Indian Defence as Black. During the World Championship Match in 2012, the Anand team noted his abrupt change from the expected Sicilian Najdorf and Petroff openings to the Sicilian Sveshnikov and the Grunfeld.

At the Tigran Petrosian school, he met the former world champion in person and received advice: 'I remember Tigran Petrosian saying to me: "Never make a move without there being an idea behind it, even when playing blitz. Always think!"'.

== Published works ==
- Gelfand, Boris (2005). My Most Memorable Games. Edition Olms. ISBN 3-283-00453-6.
- Gelfand, Boris; Aagaard, Jacob (17 June 2015). Positional Decision Making in Chess. Quality Chess. ISBN 978-1-78483-006-9.
- Gelfand, Boris; Aagaard, Jacob (7 October 2017). Dynamic Decision Making in Chess. Quality Chess. ISBN 978-1784830120.
- Gelfand, Boris (2021). Decision Making in Major Piece Endings. Quality Chess. ISBN 9781784831394.
- Gelfand, Boris (2021). Technical Decision Making in Chess. Quality Chess. ISBN 9781784830649.

== See also ==
- List of Jewish chess players
